= 2023 US Open – Men's singles qualifying =

Men's singles qualifying
- 2023 US Open

Events
Singles	men	women		boys	girls
Doubles	men	women	mixed	boys	girls
WC Singles	men	women	quad
WC Doubles	men	women	quad
Legends	men	women	mixed

Qualification
Singles	men	women
← 2022 ·	US Open	· 2024 →

The 2023 US Open – Men's singles qualifying is a series of tennis matches that will take place from August 22 to 25, 2023 to determine the sixteen qualifiers into the main draw of the men's singles tournament, and, if necessary, the lucky losers.

== Seeds ==
Seedings are based on ATP rankings as of August 21, 2023.

1. (Spain) Jaume Munar (first round)
2. (Chile) Cristian Garín (first round)
3. (Argentina) Federico Coria (qualifying competition)
4. (Japan) Taro Daniel (qualified)
5. (Belgium) David Goffin (first round)
6. (France) Hugo Gaston (qualified)
7. (Austria) Jurij Rodionov (first round)
8. (Croatia) Borna Gojo (qualified)
9. (Brazil) Thiago Seyboth Wild (second round)
10. (United Kingdom) Liam Broady (qualifying competition)
11. (Chile) Alejandro Tabilo (first round)
12. (Australia) James Duckworth (qualifying competition, lucky loser)
13. (United States) Maxime Cressy (second round)
14. (Brazil) Thiago Monteiro (first round)
15. (Italy) Luca Nardi (first round)
16. (Chile) Tomás Barrios Vera (first round)
17. (France) Arthur Cazaux (qualifying competition, lucky loser)
18. (United States) Aleksandar Kovacevic (second round)
19. (Czech Republic) Tomáš Macháč (qualifying competition)
20. (France) Benoît Paire (second round)
21. (United Kingdom) Jan Choinski (first round)
22. (Switzerland) Dominic Stricker (qualified)
23. (Kazakhstan) Timofey Skatov (qualified)
24. (Germany) Maximilian Marterer (second round)
25. (United States) Nicolas Moreno de Alboran (qualified)
26. (Spain) Pedro Martínez (first round)
27. (Canada) Gabriel Diallo (first round)
28. (Finland) Otto Virtanen (qualified)
29. (Argentina) Facundo Bagnis (second round)
30. (Italy) Giulio Zeppieri (qualifying competition)
31. (Italy) Flavio Cobolli (first round)
32. (France) Hugo Grenier (first round)

== Qualifiers ==
1. (France) Enzo Couacaud
2. (France) Titouan Droguet
3. (Brazil) Felipe Meligeni Alves
4. (Japan) Taro Daniel
5. (United States) Zachary Svajda
6. (France) Hugo Gaston
7. (Finland) Otto Virtanen
8. (Croatia) Borna Gojo
9. (Czech Republic) Jakub Menšík
10. (Japan) Sho Shimabukuro
11. (Italy) Stefano Travaglia
12. (Kazakhstan) Timofey Skatov
13. (United States) Nicolas Moreno de Alboran
14. (Chinese Taipei) Hsu Yu-hsiou
15. (Switzerland) Dominic Stricker
16. (United States) Emilio Nava

== Lucky losers ==
1. (Australia) James Duckworth
2. (France) Arthur Cazaux

== Qualifying draw ==
=== First qualifier ===
First round
1	(Spain) Jaume Munar	5	3
(France) Enzo Couacaud	7	6
(Italy) Mattia Bellucci	4	6^{4}
(Kazakhstan) Mikhail Kukushkin	6	7^{7}
(Italy) Alessandro Giannessi	7^{9}	7
(France) Harold Mayot	6^{7}	5
(Italy) Riccardo Bonadio	6^{10}	7^{7}	3
30	(Italy) Giulio Zeppieri	7^{12}	6^{3}	6

Second round
(France) Enzo Couacaud	7^{7}	6
(Kazakhstan) Mikhail Kukushkin	6^{0}	2
(Italy) Alessandro Giannessi	3	4
30	(Italy) Giulio Zeppieri	6	6

Qualifying competition
(France) Enzo Couacaud	3	6	6
30	(Italy) Giulio Zeppieri	6	1	1

=== Second qualifier ===
First round
2	(Chile) Cristian Garín	4	2
(France) Titouan Droguet	6	6
(United States) Tennys Sandgren	7^{8}	6
(United States) Denis Kudla	6^{6}	4
(Estonia) Mark Lajal	6	4	3
(Austria) Filip Misolic	3	6	6
(Belgium) Kimmer Coppejans	6	5	7^{11}
27	(Canada) Gabriel Diallo	4	7	6^{9}

Second round
(France) Titouan Droguet	2	6	7
(United States) Tennys Sandgren	6	2	5
(Austria) Filip Misolic	2	2
(Belgium) Kimmer Coppejans	6	6

Qualifying competition
(France) Titouan Droguet	6	1	7
(Belgium) Kimmer Coppejans	1	6	5

=== Third qualifier ===
First round
3	(Argentina) Federico Coria	6	6
(Argentina) Camilo Ugo Carabelli	3	1
(Argentina) Federico Delbonis	4	6	5
WC	(United States) Martin Damm	6	4	7
(Brazil) Felipe Meligeni Alves	2	6	6
(Czech Republic) Dalibor Svrčina	6	2	3
WC	(United States) Quinn Vandecasteele	1	2
29	(Argentina) Facundo Bagnis	6	6

Second round
3	(Argentina) Federico Coria	6	6
WC	(United States) Martin Damm	3	2
(Brazil) Felipe Meligeni Alves	6	6
29	(Argentina) Facundo Bagnis	4	2

Qualifying competition
3	(Argentina) Federico Coria	4	7	5
(Brazil) Felipe Meligeni Alves	6	5	7

=== Fourth qualifier ===
First round
4	(Japan) Taro Daniel	6	7
(India) Sumit Nagal	3	5
(Italy) Francesco Passaro	6^{3}	4
(South Korea) Hong Seong-chan	7^{7}	6
(Argentina) Francisco Comesaña	6	6
(Slovakia) Jozef Kovalík	4	4
(Italy) Federico Gaio	3	6	6
32	(France) Hugo Grenier	6	3	2

Second round
4	(Japan) Taro Daniel	6	4	6
(South Korea) Hong Seong-chan	2	6	1
(Argentina) Francisco Comesaña	6	5	6
(Italy) Federico Gaio	3	7	1

Qualifying competition
4	(Japan) Taro Daniel	6	6
(Argentina) Francisco Comesaña	1	4

=== Fifth qualifier ===
First round
5	(Belgium) David Goffin	6^{5}	3
(Austria) Dennis Novak	7^{7}	6
(Romania) Nicholas David Ionel	7^{7}	6^{2}	3
(Australia) Marc Polmans	6^{5}	7^{7}	6
Ivan Gakhov	6^{1}	7^{7}	6^{6}
(United States) Zachary Svajda	7^{7}	6^{5}	7^{10}
(Canada) Vasek Pospisil	7^{9}	6^{3}	6
26	(Spain) Pedro Martínez	6^{7}	7^{7}	4

Second round
(Austria) Dennis Novak	3	1
(Australia) Marc Polmans	6	6
(United States) Zachary Svajda	3	6	6
(Canada) Vasek Pospisil	6	4	2

Qualifying competition
(Australia) Marc Polmans	2	1
(United States) Zachary Svajda	6	6

=== Sixth qualifier ===
First round
6	(France) Hugo Gaston	4	6	6
(France) Antoine Escoffier	6	4	1
(Japan) Yuta Shimizu	7	3	7^{10}
WC	(United States) Cannon Kingsley	5	6	6^{7}
(Slovakia) Lukáš Klein	6	6
(Argentina) Mariano Navone	1	2
(Austria) Maximilian Neuchrist	5	6^{1}
24	(Germany) Maximilian Marterer	7	7^{7}

Second round
6	(France) Hugo Gaston	4	7^{8}	7^{10}
(Japan) Yuta Shimizu	6	6^{6}	6^{6}
(Slovakia) Lukáš Klein	7^{7}	6
24	(Germany) Maximilian Marterer	6^{5}	2

Qualifying competition
6	(France) Hugo Gaston	1	6	6
(Slovakia) Lukáš Klein	6	3	1

=== Seventh qualifier ===
First round
7	(Austria) Jurij Rodionov	4	4
WC	(United States) Patrick Kypson	6	6
(Argentina) Genaro Alberto Olivieri	1	4
(China) Shang Juncheng	6	6
(Italy) Franco Agamenone	2	3
WC	(United States) Michael Zheng	6	6
(Ecuador) Emilio Gómez	6	2	3
28	(Finland) Otto Virtanen	1	6	6

Second round
WC	(United States) Patrick Kypson	4	6^{2}
(China) Shang Juncheng	6	7^{7}
WC	(United States) Michael Zheng	1	6	3
28	(Finland) Otto Virtanen	6	3	6

Qualifying competition
(China) Shang Juncheng	5	7^{7}	1
28	(Finland) Otto Virtanen	7	6^{2}	6

=== Eighth qualifier ===
First round
8	(Croatia) Borna Gojo	7	6^{2}	6
(Serbia) Hamad Medjedovic	5	7^{7}	4
(Bulgaria) Adrian Andreev	6	6
(Bosnia and Herzegovina) Nerman Fatić	3	4
PR	(South Africa) Kevin Anderson	6	7
(Ukraine) Oleksii Krutykh	3	5
(France) Laurent Lokoli	4	1
19	(Czech Republic) Tomáš Macháč	6	6

Second round
8	(Croatia) Borna Gojo	6	6
(Bulgaria) Adrian Andreev	3	4
PR	(South Africa) Kevin Anderson	4	5
19	(Czech Republic) Tomáš Macháč	6	7

Qualifying competition
8	(Croatia) Borna Gojo	7^{7}	6
19	(Czech Republic) Tomáš Macháč	6^{5}	2

=== Ninth qualifier ===
First round
9	(Brazil) Thiago Seyboth Wild	7^{9}	6^{4}	6
(Bulgaria) Dimitar Kuzmanov	6^{7}	7^{7}	4
(Czech Republic) Zdeněk Kolář	7^{7}	6
(Netherlands) Gijs Brouwer	6^{1}	4
(Czech Republic) Jakub Menšík	1	6	6
(Italy) Fabio Fognini	6	1	1
(Switzerland) Leandro Riedi	6	2	7
31	(Italy) Flavio Cobolli	1	6	5

Second round
9	(Brazil) Thiago Seyboth Wild	3	2
(Czech Republic) Zdeněk Kolář	6	6
(Czech Republic) Jakub Menšík	6^{5}	6	6
(Switzerland) Leandro Riedi	7^{7}	3	4

Qualifying competition
(Czech Republic) Zdeněk Kolář	5	4
(Czech Republic) Jakub Menšík	7	6

=== Tenth qualifier ===
First round
10	(United Kingdom) Liam Broady	4	6	6
(Netherlands) Jelle Sels	6	1	2
(Netherlands) Jesper de Jong	6	6
WC	(United States) Tristan Boyer	3	3
(Belgium) Gauthier Onclin	6	6
(Argentina) Marco Trungelliti	3	4
(Japan) Sho Shimabukuro	6	6
21	(United Kingdom) Jan Choinski	3	3

Second round
10	(United Kingdom) Liam Broady	0	7	7
(Netherlands) Jesper de Jong	6	5	5
(Belgium) Gauthier Onclin	4	6^{0}
(Japan) Sho Shimabukuro	6	7^{7}

Qualifying competition
10	(United Kingdom) Liam Broady	4	6	3
(Japan) Sho Shimabukuro	6	3	6

=== Eleventh qualifier ===
First round
11	(Chile) Alejandro Tabilo	4	5
PR	(Australia) John Millman	6	7
(Italy) Stefano Travaglia	6^{1}	7	7^{10}
(Slovakia) Norbert Gombos	7^{7}	5	6^{6}
PR	Egor Gerasimov	6	6^{8}	1
(Japan) Shintaro Mochizuki	4	7^{10}	6
(Belgium) Zizou Bergs	3	2
17	(France) Arthur Cazaux	6	6

Second round
PR	(Australia) John Millman	6	6^{3}	2
(Italy) Stefano Travaglia	2	7^{7}	6
(Japan) Shintaro Mochizuki	1	2
17	(France) Arthur Cazaux	6	6

Qualifying competition
(Italy) Stefano Travaglia	6^{4}	6	6
17	(France) Arthur Cazaux	7^{7}	4	1

=== Twelfth qualifier ===
First round
12	(Australia) James Duckworth	7^{14}	6
WC	(United States) Trevor Svajda	6^{12}	2
(France) Térence Atmane	6	6^{6}	6
(Hungary) Máté Valkusz	2	7^{8}	3
(Ukraine) Vitaliy Sachko	6^{5}	3
(Italy) Raúl Brancaccio	7^{7}	6
(Japan) Kaichi Uchida	2	2
23	(Kazakhstan) Timofey Skatov	6	6

Second round
12	(Australia) James Duckworth	3	6	7^{10}
(France) Térence Atmane	6	4	6^{8}
(Italy) Raúl Brancaccio	4	3
23	(Kazakhstan) Timofey Skatov	6	6

Qualifying competition
12	(Australia) James Duckworth	2	2
23	(Kazakhstan) Timofey Skatov	6	6

=== Thirteenth qualifier ===
First round
13	(United States) Maxime Cressy	6	6
(Czech Republic) Vít Kopřiva	3	3
PR	(France) Pierre-Hugues Herbert	4	4
(Belgium) Joris De Loore	6	6
(Tunisia) Aziz Dougaz	7	3	7
(Italy) Edoardo Lavagno	5	6	5
(Sweden) Elias Ymer	4	2
25	(United States) Nicolas Moreno de Alboran	6	6

Second round
13	(United States) Maxime Cressy	7^{13}	2	6^{9}
(Belgium) Joris De Loore	6^{11}	6	7^{11}
(Tunisia) Aziz Dougaz	6^{5}	4
25	(United States) Nicolas Moreno de Alboran	7^{7}	6

Qualifying competition
(Belgium) Joris De Loore	6	6^{3}	6^{12}
25	(United States) Nicolas Moreno de Alboran	3	7^{7}	7^{14}

=== Fourteenth qualifier ===
First round
14	(Brazil) Thiago Monteiro	7^{13}	6^{5}	6^{8}
(France) Giovanni Mpetshi Perricard	6^{11}	7^{7}	7^{10}
(Portugal) Frederico Ferreira Silva	6	1	4
WC	(United States) Aidan Mayo	3	6	6
(Chinese Taipei) Hsu Yu-hsiou	7^{7}	6
(Turkey) Cem İlkel	6^{4}	1
(France) Geoffrey Blancaneaux	2	3
20	(France) Benoît Paire	6	6

Second round
(France) Giovanni Mpetshi Perricard	6^{6}	6^{8}
WC	(United States) Aidan Mayo	7^{8}	7^{10}
(Chinese Taipei) Hsu Yu-hsiou	6	3	7
20	(France) Benoît Paire	3	6	5

Qualifying competition
WC	(United States) Aidan Mayo	5	3
(Chinese Taipei) Hsu Yu-hsiou	7	6

=== Fifteenth qualifier ===
First round
15	(Italy) Luca Nardi	4	4
(Argentina) Thiago Agustín Tirante	6	6
(United States) Brandon Holt	6	6
(Switzerland) Alexander Ritschard	1	4
(Spain) Pablo Llamas Ruiz	6	6
(Argentina) Andrea Collarini	3	3
(Canada) Alexis Galarneau	6	2	0
22	(Switzerland) Dominic Stricker	3	6	6

Second round
(Argentina) Thiago Agustín Tirante	7^{7}	6
(United States) Brandon Holt	6^{4}	3
(Spain) Pablo Llamas Ruiz	7^{7}	4	6^{11}
22	(Switzerland) Dominic Stricker	6^{2}	6	7^{13}

Qualifying competition
(Argentina) Thiago Agustín Tirante	2	3
22	(Switzerland) Dominic Stricker	6	6

=== Sixteenth qualifier ===
First round
16	(Chile) Tomás Barrios Vera	5	2
(United States) Emilio Nava	7	6
(Bosnia and Herzegovina) Damir Džumhur	6^{3}	4
(Italy) Andrea Vavassori	7^{7}	6
WC	(United States) Eliot Spizzirri	6	6^{3}	6
(Italy) Matteo Gigante	4	7^{7}	1
(Chinese Taipei) Wu Tung-lin	6	2	3
18	(United States) Aleksandar Kovacevic	3	6	6

Second round
(United States) Emilio Nava	7	6
(Italy) Andrea Vavassori	5	4
WC	(United States) Eliot Spizzirri	6	6
18	(United States) Aleksandar Kovacevic	4	4

Qualifying competition
(United States) Emilio Nava	6	3	3
WC	(United States) Eliot Spizzirri	3	6	1^{r}
