= 2023 US Open – Day-by-day summaries =

Tennis tournament match results

The 2023 US Open described in detail, in the form of day-by-day summaries.

== Day 1 (August 28) ==
- Seeds out:
  - Men's Singles: (Denmark) Holger Rune [4], (Canada) Félix Auger-Aliassime [15], (Italy) Lorenzo Musetti [18], (Kazakhstan) Alexander Bublik [25], (United States) Sebastian Korda [31]
  - Women's Singles: (Greece) Maria Sakkari [8], Veronika Kudermetova [16], (Ukraine) Anhelina Kalinina [28], (Italy) Elisabetta Cocciaretto [29]
- Schedule of Play

Matches on main courts
Matches on Arthur Ashe Stadium
Event	Winner	Loser	Score
Women's Singles 1st Round	(Poland) Iga Świątek [1]	(Sweden) Rebecca Peterson	6–0, 6–1
Men's Singles 1st Round	(United States) Frances Tiafoe [10]	(United States) Learner Tien [WC]	6–2, 7–5, 6–1
2023 US Open Opening Night Ceremony
Women's Singles 1st Round	(United States) Coco Gauff [6]	(Germany) Laura Siegemund [Q]	3–6, 6–2, 6–4
Men's Singles 1st Round	(Serbia) Novak Djokovic [2]	(France) Alexandre Müller	6–0, 6–2, 6–3
Matches on Louis Armstrong Stadium
Event	Winner	Loser	Score
Women's Singles 1st Round	Victoria Azarenka [18]	(France) Fiona Ferro [WC]	6–1, 6–2
Women's Singles 1st Round	(Brazil) Beatriz Haddad Maia [19]	(United States) Sloane Stephens	6–2, 5–7, 6–4
Men's Singles 1st Round	(United States) Taylor Fritz [9]	(United States) Steve Johnson [WC]	6–2, 6–1, 6–2
Men's Singles 1st Round	(Greece) Stefanos Tsitsipas [7]	(Canada) Milos Raonic [PR]	6–2, 6–3, 6–4
Women's Singles 1st Round	(Denmark) Caroline Wozniacki [WC]	Tatiana Prozorova [Q]	6–3, 6–2
Matches on Grandstand
Event	Winner	Loser	Score
Men's Singles 1st Round	(Austria) Dominic Thiem	(Kazakhstan) Alexander Bublik [25]	6–3, 6–2, 6–4
Women's Singles 1st Round	(United States) Danielle Collins	(Czech Republic) Linda Fruhvirtová	6–2, 6–0
Women's Singles 1st Round	(Kazakhstan) Elena Rybakina [4]	(Ukraine) Marta Kostyuk	6–2, 6–1
Men's Singles 1st Round	(United States) Christopher Eubanks [28]	(South Korea) Kwon Soon-woo	6–3, 6–4, 0–6, 6–4
Colored background indicates a night match
Matches start at 12 pm (Arthur Ashe Stadium) and 11am (other courts), night session starts at 7pm Eastern Daylight Time (EDT)

== Day 2 (August 29) ==
- Seeds out:
  - Men's Singles: Karen Khachanov [11], (Netherlands) Tallon Griekspoor [24], (Croatia) Borna Ćorić [27], (France) Ugo Humbert [29]
  - Women's Singles: (France) Caroline Garcia [7], (Czech Republic) Barbora Krejčíková [12], (Croatia) Donna Vekić [21], Anastasia Potapova [27]
- Schedule of Play

Matches on main courts
Matches on Arthur Ashe Stadium
Event	Winner	Loser	Score
Men's Singles 1st Round	Daniil Medvedev [3]	(Hungary) Attila Balázs [PR]	6–1, 6–1, 6–0
Women's Singles 1st Round	(United States) Jessica Pegula [3]	(Italy) Camila Giorgi	6–2, 6–2
Women's Singles 1st Round	(Belgium) Greet Minnen [Q]	(United States) Venus Williams [WC]	6–1, 6–1
Men's Singles 1st Round	(Spain) Carlos Alcaraz [1]	(Germany) Dominik Koepfer	6–2, 3–2, retired
Matches on Louis Armstrong Stadium
Event	Winner	Loser	Score
Women's Singles 1st Round	(Tunisia) Ons Jabeur [5]	(Colombia) Camila Osorio	7–5, 7–6^{(7–4)}
Women's Singles 1st Round	(United States) Madison Keys [17]	(Netherlands) Arantxa Rus	6–2, 6–4
Men's Singles 1st Round	(United States) John Isner [WC]	(Argentina) Facundo Díaz Acosta	6–4, 6–3, 7–6^{(7–1)}
Men's Singles 1st Round	(Italy) Jannik Sinner [6]	(Germany) Yannick Hanfmann	6–3, 6–1, 6–1
Women's Singles 1st Round	Aryna Sabalenka [2]	(Belgium) Maryna Zanevska	6–3, 6–2
Matches on Grandstand
Event	Winner	Loser	Score
Women's Singles 1st Round	Ekaterina Alexandrova [22]	(Canada) Leylah Fernandez	7–6^{(7–4)}, 5–7, 6–4
Men's Singles 1st Round	(United Kingdom) Andy Murray	(France) Corentin Moutet	6–2, 7–5, 6–3
Men's Singles 1st Round	(Switzerland) Stan Wawrinka	(Japan) Yoshihito Nishioka	7–6^{(7–5)}, 6–2, 6–4
Women's Singles 1st Round	(United States) Sofia Kenin	(Romania) Ana Bogdan	7–6^{(7–2)}, 6–4
Colored background indicates a night match
Matches start at 12 pm (Arthur Ashe Stadium) and 11am (other courts), night session starts at 7pm Eastern Daylight Time (EDT)

== Day 3 (August 30) ==
- Seeds out:
  - Men's Singles: (Norway) Casper Ruud [5], (Greece) Stefanos Tsitsipas [7], (Argentina) Francisco Cerúndolo [20], (United States) Chris Eubanks [28]
  - Women's Singles: (Czech Republic) Petra Kvitová [11], Victoria Azarenka [18], (Brazil) Beatriz Haddad Maia [19], (Poland) Magda Linette [24]
  - Men's Doubles: (Belgium) Sander Gillé / (Belgium) Joran Vliegen [11]
  - Women's Doubles: (Japan) Shuko Aoyama / (Japan) Ena Shibahara [7]
  - Mixed Doubles: (United States) Nicole Melichar-Martinez / (Australia) Matthew Ebden [6]
- Schedule of Play

Matches on main courts
Matches on Arthur Ashe Stadium
Event	Winner	Loser	Score
Women's Singles 2nd Round	(United States) Coco Gauff [6]	Mirra Andreeva	6–3, 6–2
Men's Singles 2nd Round	(Serbia) Novak Djokovic [2]	(Spain) Bernabé Zapata Miralles	6–4, 6–1, 6–1
Men's Singles 2nd Round	(United States) Frances Tiafoe [10]	(Austria) Sebastian Ofner	6–3, 6–1, 6–4
Women's Singles 2nd Round	(Denmark) Caroline Wozniacki [WC]	(Czech Republic) Petra Kvitová [11]	7–5, 7–6^{(7–5)}
Matches on Louis Armstrong Stadium
Event	Winner	Loser	Score
Women's Singles 2nd Round	(Belgium) Elise Mertens [32]	(United States) Danielle Collins	3–6, 7–6^{(9–7)}, 6–1
Women's Singles 2nd Round	(Poland) Iga Świątek [1]	(Australia) Daria Saville [PR]	6–3, 6–4
Men's Singles 2nd Round	(United States) Ben Shelton	(Austria) Dominic Thiem	7–6^{(7–1)}, 1–0, retired
Women's Singles 2nd Round	(Kazakhstan) Elena Rybakina [4]	(Australia) Ajla Tomljanović	Walkover
Women's Singles 2nd Round (Note: This match was originally scheduled to play on Court 17 but was moved to Louis Armstrong Stadium following Ajla Tomljanović's withdrawal.)	(United States) Jennifer Brady [PR]	(Poland) Magda Linette [24]	6–1, 2–6, 6–2
Men's Singles 2nd Round	(United States) Taylor Fritz [9]	(Peru) Juan Pablo Varillas	6–1, 6–2, 6–2
Matches on Grandstand
Event	Winner	Loser	Score
Men's Singles 2nd Round	(Switzerland) Dominic Stricker [Q]	(Greece) Stefanos Tsitsipas [7]	7–5, 6–7^{(2–7)}, 6–7^{(5–7)}, 7–6^{(8–6)}, 6–3
Women's Singles 2nd Round	(China) Zhu Lin	Victoria Azarenka [18]	6–3, 6–3
Women's Doubles 1st Round	(United States) Coco Gauff [3] (United States) Jessica Pegula [3]	(United States) Quinn Gleason [WC] (United States) Elizabeth Mandlik [WC]	6–2, 6–1
Men's Singles 2nd Round	(China) Zhang Zhizhen	(Norway) Casper Ruud [5]	6–4, 5–7, 6–2, 0–6, 6–2
Colored background indicates a night match
Matches start at 12 pm (Arthur Ashe Stadium) and 11am (other courts), night session starts at 7pm Eastern Daylight Time (EDT)

== Day 4 (August 31) ==
- Seeds out:
  - Men's Singles: (Poland) Hubert Hurkacz [17], (Argentina) Tomás Martín Etcheverry [30]
  - Women's Singles: (Czech Republic) Karolína Plíšková [25]
  - Men's Doubles: (Germany) Kevin Krawietz / (Germany) Tim Pütz [10]
  - Women's Doubles: (Australia) Storm Hunter / (Belgium) Elise Mertens [2]
- Schedule of Play

Matches on main courts
Matches on Arthur Ashe Stadium
Event	Winner	Loser	Score
Men's Singles 2nd Round	(Bulgaria) Grigor Dimitrov [19]	(United Kingdom) Andy Murray	6–3, 6–4, 6–1
Women's Singles 2nd Round	(United States) Madison Keys [17]	(Belgium) Yanina Wickmayer [LL]	6–1, 6–2
Men's Singles 2nd Round	(Spain) Carlos Alcaraz [1]	(South Africa) Lloyd Harris [PR]	6–3, 6–1, 7–6^{(7–4)}
Women's Singles 2nd Round	(United States) Jessica Pegula [3]	(Romania) Patricia Maria Țig [PR]	6–3, 6–1
Matches on Louis Armstrong Stadium
Event	Winner	Loser	Score
Men's Singles 2nd Round	(Italy) Jannik Sinner [6]	(Italy) Lorenzo Sonego	6–4, 6–2, 6–4
Women's Singles 2nd Round	Aryna Sabalenka [2]	(United Kingdom) Jodie Burrage	6–3, 6–2
Women's Singles 2nd Round	(Ukraine) Elina Svitolina [26]	Anastasia Pavlyuchenkova	5–7, 6–4, 6–4
Women's Singles 2nd Round	Daria Kasatkina [13]	(United States) Sofia Kenin	2–6, 6–4, 6–4
Men's Singles 2nd Round	Daniil Medvedev [3]	(Australia) Christopher O'Connell	6–2, 6–2, 6–7^{(6–8)}, 6–2
Matches on Grandstand
Event	Winner	Loser	Score
Men's Singles 2nd Round	(United States) Michael Mmoh [WC]	(United States) John Isner [WC]	3–6, 4–6, 7–6^{(7–3)}, 6–4, 7–6^{(10–7)}
Women's Singles 2nd Round	(Czech Republic) Markéta Vondroušová [9]	(Italy) Martina Trevisan	6–2, 6–2
Men's Singles 2nd Round	Andrey Rublev [8]	(France) Gaël Monfils [PR]	6–4, 6–3, 3–6, 6–1
Women's Singles 2nd Round	(Tunisia) Ons Jabeur [5]	(Czech Republic) Linda Nosková	7–6^{(9–7)}, 4–6, 6–3
Colored background indicates a night match
Matches start at 12 pm (Arthur Ashe Stadium) and 11am (other courts), night session starts at 7pm Eastern Daylight Time (EDT)

== Day 5 (September 1) ==
- Seeds out:
  - Men's Singles: (Spain) Alejandro Davidovich Fokina [21], (France) Adrian Mannarino [22], (Serbia) Laslo Djere [32]
  - Women's Singles: (Kazakhstan) Elena Rybakina [4], (Belgium) Elise Mertens [32]
  - Men's Doubles: (United Kingdom) Jamie Murray / (New Zealand) Michael Venus [12]
  - Women's Doubles: (Czech Republic) Barbora Krejčíková / (Czech Republic) Kateřina Siniaková [1], (Ukraine) Lyudmyla Kichenok / (Latvia) Jeļena Ostapenko [10], (Chinese Taipei) Latisha Chan / (China) Yang Zhaoxuan [11]
  - Mixed Doubles: (Brazil) Luisa Stefani / (United Kingdom) Joe Salisbury [4]
- Schedule of Play

Matches on main courts
Matches on Arthur Ashe Stadium
Event	Winner	Loser	Score
Men's Singles 3rd Round	(United States) Tommy Paul [14]	(Spain) Alejandro Davidovich Fokina [21]	6–1, 6–0, 3–6, 6–3
Women's Singles 3rd Round	(Denmark) Caroline Wozniacki [WC]	(United States) Jennifer Brady [PR]	4–6, 6–3, 6–1
Women's Singles 3rd Round	(United States) Coco Gauff [6]	(Belgium) Elise Mertens [32]	3–6, 6–3, 6–0
Men's Singles 3rd Round	(Serbia) Novak Djokovic [2]	(Serbia) Laslo Djere [32]	4–6, 4–6, 6–1, 6–1, 6–3
Matches on Louis Armstrong Stadium
Event	Winner	Loser	Score
Women's Singles 3rd Round	(Czech Republic) Karolína Muchová [10]	(United States) Taylor Townsend	7–6^{(7–0)}, 6–3
Women's Singles 3rd Round	(Poland) Iga Świątek [1]	(Slovenia) Kaja Juvan [Q]	6–0, 6–1
Men's Singles 3rd Round	(United States) Frances Tiafoe [10]	(France) Adrian Mannarino [22]	4–6, 6–2, 6–3, 7–6^{(8–6)}
Men's Singles 3rd Round	(United States) Taylor Fritz [9]	(Czech Republic) Jakub Menšík [Q]	6–1, 6–2, 6–0
Women's Singles 3rd Round	(Romania) Sorana Cîrstea [30]	(Kazakhstan) Elena Rybakina [4]	6–3, 6–7^{(6–8)}, 6–4
Matches on Grandstand
Event	Winner	Loser	Score
Women's Singles 3rd Round	(China) Wang Xinyu	(Slovakia) Anna Karolína Schmiedlová	4–6, 6–3, 6–2
Men's Singles 3rd Round	(United States) Ben Shelton	Aslan Karatsev	6–4, 3–6, 6–2, 6–0
Men's Singles 3rd Round	(Switzerland) Dominic Stricker [Q]	(France) Benjamin Bonzi [WC]	2–6, 7–5, 7–6^{(7–4)}, 3–6, 6–2
Women's Singles 3rd Round	(Switzerland) Belinda Bencic [15]	(China) Zhu Lin	7–6^{(7–1)}, 2–6, 6–3
Colored background indicates a night match
Matches start at 12 pm (Arthur Ashe Stadium) and 11am (other courts), night session starts at 7pm Eastern Daylight Time (EDT)

== Day 6 (September 2) ==
- Seeds out:
  - Men's Singles: (United Kingdom) Cameron Norrie [16], (Bulgaria) Grigor Dimitrov [19], (Chile) Nicolás Jarry [23], (United Kingdom) Dan Evans [26]
  - Women's Singles: Liudmila Samsonova [14], Ekaterina Alexandrova [22], (Ukraine) Elina Svitolina [26], (Czech Republic) Marie Bouzková [31]
  - Men's Doubles: (United Kingdom) Lloyd Glasspool / (Finland) Harri Heliövaara [13], (Netherlands) Matwé Middelkoop / (Croatia) Mate Pavić [14], (Netherlands) Robin Haase / (Croatia) Nikola Mektić [16]
  - Women's Doubles: (United States) Desirae Krawczyk / (Netherlands) Demi Schuurs [4], (United States) Nicole Melichar-Martinez / (Australia) Ellen Perez [5], (Chinese Taipei) Chan Hao-ching / (Mexico) Giuliana Olmos [9], Veronika Kudermetova / Liudmila Samsonova [13]
  - Mixed Doubles: (Chinese Taipei) Hsieh Su-wei / (El Salvador) Marcelo Arévalo [3], (China) Yang Zhaoxuan / (Germany) Kevin Krawietz [8]
- Schedule of Play

Matches on main courts
Matches on Arthur Ashe Stadium
Event	Winner	Loser	Score
Men's Singles 3rd Round	(Spain) Carlos Alcaraz [1]	(United Kingdom) Dan Evans [26]	6–2, 6–3, 4–6, 6–3
Women's Singles 3rd Round	(United States) Jessica Pegula [3]	(Ukraine) Elina Svitolina [26]	6–4, 4–6, 6–2
Women's Singles 3rd Round	(Tunisia) Ons Jabeur [5]	(Czech Republic) Marie Bouzková [31]	5–7, 7–6^{(7–5)}, 6–3
Men's Singles 3rd Round	Daniil Medvedev [3]	(Argentina) Sebastián Báez	6–2, 6–2, 7–6^{(8–6)}
Matches on Louis Armstrong Stadium
Event	Winner	Loser	Score
Women's Singles 3rd Round	Aryna Sabalenka [2]	(France) Clara Burel	6–1, 6–1
Women's Singles 3rd Round	(United States) Madison Keys [17]	Liudmila Samsonova [14]	5–7, 6–2, 6–2
Men's Singles 3rd Round	(Italy) Jannik Sinner [6]	(Switzerland) Stan Wawrinka	6–3, 2–6, 6–4, 6–2
Men's Singles 3rd Round	(Germany) Alexander Zverev [12]	(Bulgaria) Grigor Dimitrov [19]	6–7^{(2–7)}, 7–6^{(10–8)}, 6–1, 6–1
Women's Singles 3rd Round	(Czech Republic) Markéta Vondroušová [9]	Ekaterina Alexandrova [22]	6–2, 6–1
Matches on Grandstand
Event	Winner	Loser	Score
Men's Singles 3rd Round	(United Kingdom) Jack Draper	(United States) Michael Mmoh [WC]	6–4, 6–2, 3–6, 6–3
Men's Singles 3rd Round	Andrey Rublev [8]	(France) Arthur Rinderknech	3–6, 6–3, 6–1, 7–5
Women's Doubles 2nd Round	(United States) Coco Gauff [3] (United States) Jessica Pegula [3]	(Spain) Cristina Bucșa; Alexandra Panova	6–1, 7–5
Colored background indicates a night match
Matches start at 12 pm (Arthur Ashe Stadium) and 11am (other courts), night session starts at 7pm Eastern Daylight Time (EDT)

== Day 7 (September 3) ==
- Seeds out:
  - Men's Singles: (United States) Tommy Paul [14]
  - Women's Singles: (Poland) Iga Świątek [1], (Switzerland) Belinda Bencic [15]
  - Men's Doubles: (Spain) Marcel Granollers / (Argentina) Horacio Zeballos [8]
- Schedule of Play

Matches on main courts
Matches on Arthur Ashe Stadium
Event	Winner	Loser	Score
Men's Singles 4th Round	(United States) Ben Shelton	(United States) Tommy Paul [14]	6–4, 6–3, 4–6, 6–4
Women's Singles 4th Round	(United States) Coco Gauff [6]	(Denmark) Caroline Wozniacki [WC]	6–3, 3–6, 6–1
Men's Singles 4th Round	(Serbia) Novak Djokovic [2]	(Croatia) Borna Gojo [Q]	6–2, 7–5, 6–4
Women's Singles 4th Round	(Latvia) Jeļena Ostapenko [20]	(Poland) Iga Świątek [1]	3–6, 6–3, 6–1
Matches on Louis Armstrong Stadium
Event	Winner	Loser	Score
Women's Singles 4th Round	(Czech Republic) Karolína Muchová [10]	(China) Wang Xinyu	6–3, 5–7, 6–1
Women's Singles 4th Round	(Romania) Sorana Cîrstea [30]	(Switzerland) Belinda Bencic [15]	6–3, 6–3
Men's Singles 4th Round	(United States) Frances Tiafoe [10]	(Australia) Rinky Hijikata [WC]	6–4, 6–1, 6–4
Men's Singles 4th Round	(United States) Taylor Fritz [9]	(Switzerland) Dominic Stricker [Q]	7–6^{(7–2)}, 6–4, 6–4
Matches on Grandstand
Event	Winner	Loser	Score
Women's Doubles 3rd Round	(Canada) Leylah Fernandez [6] (United States) Taylor Townsend [6]	(Czech Republic) Karolína Plíšková (Croatia) Donna Vekić	7–6^{(7–3)}, 6–3
Mixed Doubles 2nd Round	(United States) Jessica Pegula [1] (United States) Austin Krajicek [1]	(United States) Bethanie Mattek-Sands [WC] (United Kingdom) Jamie Murray [WC]	7–6^{(7–5)}, 7–5
Men's Doubles 3rd Round	(Argentina) Máximo González [5] (Argentina) Andrés Molteni [5]	(Netherlands) Tallon Griekspoor (Australia) Thanasi Kokkinakis	7–6^{(7–4)}, 6–7^{(2–7)}, 6–3
Mixed Doubles 2nd Round	(United States) Taylor Townsend (United States) Ben Shelton	(Indonesia) Aldila Sutjiadi (India) Rohan Bopanna	6–2, 7–5
Colored background indicates a night match
Matches start at 12 pm (Arthur Ashe Stadium) and 11am (other courts), night session starts at 7pm Eastern Daylight Time (EDT)

== Day 8 (September 4) ==
- Seeds out:
  - Men's Singles: (Italy) Jannik Sinner [6], (Australia) Alex de Minaur [13]
  - Women's Singles: (United States) Jessica Pegula [3], (Tunisia) Ons Jabeur [5], Daria Kasatkina [13]
  - Men's Doubles: (Netherlands) Wesley Koolhof / (United Kingdom) Neal Skupski [1], (El Salvador) Marcelo Arévalo / (Netherlands) Jean-Julien Rojer [4], (Mexico) Santiago González / (France) Édouard Roger-Vasselin [7]
  - Women's Doubles: (Ukraine) Marta Kostyuk / (Romania) Elena-Gabriela Ruse [14], (Japan) Miyu Kato / (Indonesia) Aldila Sutjiadi [15]
  - Mixed Doubles: (Netherlands) Demi Schuurs / (Monaco) Hugo Nys [7]
- Schedule of Play

Matches on main courts
Matches on Arthur Ashe Stadium
Event	Winner	Loser	Score
Women's Singles 4th Round	(United States) Madison Keys [17]	(United States) Jessica Pegula [3]	6–1, 6–3
Men's Singles 4th Round	(Spain) Carlos Alcaraz [1]	(Italy) Matteo Arnaldi	6–3, 6–3, 6–4
Women's Doubles 3rd Round (Note: This match was originally scheduled to play on Grandstand but was moved to Arthur Ashe Stadium following the Alcaraz-Arnaldi match.)	(United States) Coco Gauff [3] (United States) Jessica Pegula [3]	(Ukraine) Marta Kostyuk [14] (Romania) Elena-Gabriela Ruse [14]	6–4, 6–1
Women's Singles 4th Round	Aryna Sabalenka [2]	Daria Kasatkina [13]	6–1, 6–3
Men's Singles 4th Round	(Germany) Alexander Zverev [12]	(Italy) Jannik Sinner [6]	6–4, 3–6, 6–2, 4–6, 6–3
Matches on Louis Armstrong Stadium
Event	Winner	Loser	Score
Women's Singles 4th Round	(Czech Republic) Markéta Vondroušová [9]	(United States) Peyton Stearns	6–7^{(3–7)}, 6–3, 6–2
Men's Singles 4th Round	Andrey Rublev [8]	(United Kingdom) Jack Draper	6–3, 3–6, 6–3, 6–4
Women's Singles 4th Round	(China) Zheng Qinwen [23]	(Tunisia) Ons Jabeur [5]	6–2, 6–4
Men's Singles 4th Round	Daniil Medvedev [3]	(Australia) Alex de Minaur [13]	2–6, 6–4, 6–1, 6–2
Matches on Grandstand
Event	Winner	Loser	Score
Men's Doubles 3rd Round	(Croatia) Ivan Dodig [2] (United States) Austin Krajicek [2]	(United States) Vasil Kirkov [WC] (United States) Denis Kudla [WC]	5–7, 6–4, 7–5
Women's Doubles 3rd Round	Victoria Azarenka (Brazil) Beatriz Haddad Maia	(Japan) Miyu Kato [15] (Indonesia) Aldila Sutjiadi [15]	6–2, 6–0
Mixed Doubles Quarterfinals	(United States) Taylor Townsend (United States) Ben Shelton	(Netherlands) Demi Schuurs [7] (Monaco) Hugo Nys [7]	6–4, 6–2
Colored background indicates a night match
Matches start at 12 pm (Arthur Ashe Stadium) and 11am (other courts), night session starts at 7pm Eastern Daylight Time (EDT)

== Day 9 (September 5) ==
- Seeds out:
  - Men's Singles: (United States) Taylor Fritz [9], (United States) Frances Tiafoe [10]
  - Women's Singles: (Latvia) Jeļena Ostapenko [20], (Romania) Sorana Cîrstea [30]
  - Men's Doubles: (Argentina) Máximo González / (Argentina) Andrés Molteni [5], (Monaco) Hugo Nys / (Poland) Jan Zieliński [9], (United States) Nathaniel Lammons / (United States) Jackson Withrow [15]
  - Women's Doubles: (Canada) Leylah Fernandez / (United States) Taylor Townsend [6]
  - Mixed Doubles: (Australia) Ellen Perez / (Netherlands) Jean-Julien Rojer [5]
- Schedule of Play

Matches on main courts
Matches on Arthur Ashe Stadium
Event	Winner	Loser	Score
Women's Singles Quarterfinals	(United States) Coco Gauff [6]	(Latvia) Jeļena Ostapenko [20]	6–0, 6–2
Men's Singles Quarterfinals	(Serbia) Novak Djokovic [2]	(United States) Taylor Fritz [9]	6–1, 6–4, 6–4
Women's Singles Quarterfinals	(Czech Republic) Karolína Muchová [10]	(Romania) Sorana Cîrstea [30]	6–0, 6–3
Men's Singles Quarterfinals	(United States) Ben Shelton	(United States) Frances Tiafoe [10]	6–2, 3–6, 7–6^{(9–7)}, 6–2
Matches on Louis Armstrong Stadium
Event	Winner	Loser	Score
Men's Doubles Quarterfinals	(United States) Rajeev Ram [3] (United Kingdom) Joe Salisbury [3]	(Argentina) Máximo González [5] (Argentina) Andrés Molteni [5]	6–4, 6–3
Women's Doubles Quarterfinals	(United States) Jennifer Brady [PR] (Brazil) Luisa Stefani [PR]	(Poland) Magda Linette (United States) Bernarda Pera	7–6^{(7–1)}, 3–6, 6–3
Women's Doubles Quarterfinals	(Canada) Gabriela Dabrowski [16] (New Zealand) Erin Routliffe [16]	(Canada) Leylah Fernandez [6] (United States) Taylor Townsend [6]	2–6, 6–3, 7–6^{(10–8)}
Mixed Doubles Quarterfinals	(United States) Jessica Pegula [1] (United States) Austin Krajicek [1]	(Australia) Ellen Perez [5] (Netherlands) Jean-Julien Rojer [5]	6–4, 3–6, [10–8]
Matches on Grandstand
Event	Winner	Loser	Score
Men's Doubles Quarterfinals	(France) Pierre-Hugues Herbert [PR] (France) Nicolas Mahut [PR]	(United States) Robert Galloway (France) Albano Olivetti	7–5, 6–4
Mixed Doubles Quarterfinals	(Japan) Ena Shibahara (Croatia) Mate Pavić	(Czech Republic) Barbora Strýcová (Mexico) Santiago González	6–4, 7–6^{(8–6)}
Men's Doubles Quarterfinals	(Croatia) Ivan Dodig [2] (United States) Austin Krajicek [2]	(Monaco) Hugo Nys [9] (Poland) Jan Zieliński [9]	6–4, 2–6, 6–3
Men's Doubles Quarterfinals	(India) Rohan Bopanna [6] (Australia) Matthew Ebden [6]	(United States) Nathaniel Lammons [15] (United States) Jackson Withrow [15]	7–6^{(12–10)}, 6–1
Colored background indicates a night match
Matches start at 12 pm (Arthur Ashe Stadium) and 11am (other courts), night session starts at 7pm Eastern Daylight Time (EDT)

== Day 10 (September 6) ==
- Seeds out:
  - Men's Singles: Andrey Rublev [8], (Germany) Alexander Zverev [12]
  - Women's Singles: (Czech Republic) Markéta Vondroušová [9], (China) Zheng Qinwen [23]
  - Women's Doubles: (United States) Coco Gauff / (United States) Jessica Pegula [3]
- Schedule of Play

Matches on main courts
Matches on Arthur Ashe Stadium
Event	Winner	Loser	Score
Women's Singles Quarterfinals	Aryna Sabalenka [2]	(China) Zheng Qinwen [23]	6–1, 6–4
Men's Singles Quarterfinals	Daniil Medvedev [3]	Andrey Rublev [8]	6–4, 6–3, 6–4
Women's Singles Quarterfinals	(United States) Madison Keys [17]	(Czech Republic) Markéta Vondroušová [9]	6–1, 6–4
Men's Singles Quarterfinals	(Spain) Carlos Alcaraz [1]	(Germany) Alexander Zverev [12]	6–3, 6–2, 6–4
Matches on Louis Armstrong Stadium
Event	Winner	Loser	Score
Women's Doubles Quarterfinals	(Germany) Laura Siegemund [12] Vera Zvonareva [12]	Victoria Azarenka (Brazil) Beatriz Haddad Maia	5–7, 7–5, 6–4
Women's Doubles Quarterfinals	(Chinese Taipei) Hsieh Su-wei [8] (China) Wang Xinyu [8]	(United States) Coco Gauff [3] (United States) Jessica Pegula [3]	7–6^{(7–3)}, 3–6, 6–4
Mixed Doubles Semifinals	(Kazakhstan) Anna Danilina (Finland) Harri Heliövaara	(Japan) Ena Shibahara (Croatia) Mate Pavić	7–6^{(7–2)}, 6–4
Mixed Doubles Semifinals	(United States) Jessica Pegula [1] (United States) Austin Krajicek [1]	(United States) Taylor Townsend (United States) Ben Shelton	6–7^{(5–7)}, 6–1, [10–3]
Matches on Grandstand
Event	Winner	Loser	Score
Boys' Singles 3rd Round	(Brazil) João Fonseca [7]	(Italy) Fabio De Michele [Q]	6–3, 6–4
Boys' Singles 3rd Round	(United States) Learner Tien [11]	(Italy) Carlo Alberto Caniato [SE]	6–4, 6–3
Boys' Doubles 2nd Round	(Italy) Federico Bondioli [6] (Austria) Joel Schwärzler [6]	(Italy) Fabio De Michele (Italy) Gabriele Vulpitta	6–3, 6–4
Wheelchair Women's Doubles Quarterfinals	(United States) Dana Mathewson (Japan) Manami Tanaka	(Japan) Momoko Ohtani (Netherlands) Aniek van Koot	6–3, 3–6, [10–7]
Colored background indicates a night match
Matches start at 12 pm (Arthur Ashe Stadium) and 11am (other courts), night session starts at 7pm Eastern Daylight Time (EDT)

== Day 11 (September 7) ==
- Seeds out:
  - Women's Singles: (Czech Republic) Karolína Muchová [10], (United States) Madison Keys [17]
  - Men's Doubles: (Croatia) Ivan Dodig / (United States) Austin Krajicek [2]
- Schedule of Play

Matches on main courts
Matches on Arthur Ashe Stadium
Event	Winner	Loser	Score
Women's Singles Semifinals	(United States) Coco Gauff [6]	(Czech Republic) Karolína Muchová [10]	6–4, 7–5
Women's Singles Semifinals	Aryna Sabalenka [2]	(United States) Madison Keys [17]	0–6, 7–6^{(7–1)}, 7–6^{(10–5)}
Matches on Louis Armstrong Stadium
Event	Winner	Loser	Score
Men's Doubles Semifinals	(India) Rohan Bopanna [6] (Australia) Matthew Ebden [6]	(France) Pierre-Hugues Herbert (France) Nicolas Mahut	7–6^{(7–3)}, 6–2
Men's Doubles Semifinals	(United States) Rajeev Ram [3] (United Kingdom) Joe Salisbury [3]	(Croatia) Ivan Dodig [2] (United States) Austin Krajicek [2]	7–5, 3–6, 6–3
Wheelchair Quad Men's Doubles Semifinals	(United Kingdom) Andy Lapthorne (South Africa) Donald Ramphadi	(Slovakia) Tomáš Masaryk (Brazil) Ymanitu Silva	6–2, 3–2 retired
Wheelchair Men's Doubles Semifinals	(France) Stéphane Houdet (Japan) Takashi Sanada	(United Kingdom) Alfie Hewett [1] (United Kingdom) Gordon Reid [1]	7–5, 7–6^{(10–8)}
Colored background indicates a night match
Matches start at 12 pm, night session starts at 7pm Eastern Daylight Time (EDT)

== Day 12 (September 8) ==
- Seeds out:
  - Men's Singles: (Spain) Carlos Alcaraz [1]
  - Men's Doubles: (India) Rohan Bopanna / (Australia) Matthew Ebden [6]
  - Women's Doubles: (Chinese Taipei) Hsieh Su-wei / (China) Wang Xinyu [8]
- Schedule of Play

Matches on main courts
Matches on Arthur Ashe Stadium
Event	Winner	Loser	Score
Men's Doubles Final	(United States) Rajeev Ram [3] (United Kingdom) Joe Salisbury [3]	(India) Rohan Bopanna [6] (Australia) Matthew Ebden [6]	2–6, 6–3, 6–4
Men's Singles Semifinals	(Serbia) Novak Djokovic [2]	(United States) Ben Shelton	6–3, 6–2, 7–6^{(7–4)}
Men's Singles Semifinals	Daniil Medvedev [3]	(Spain) Carlos Alcaraz [1]	7–6^{(7–3)}, 6–1, 3–6, 6–3
Matches on Louis Armstrong Stadium
Event	Winner	Loser	Score
Women's Doubles Semifinals	(Canada) Gabriela Dabrowski [16] (New Zealand) Erin Routliffe [16]	(Chinese Taipei) Hsieh Su-wei [8] (China) Wang Xinyu [8]	6–1, 7–6^{(7–4)}
Women's Doubles Semifinals	(Germany) Laura Siegemund [12] Vera Zvonareva [12]	(United States) Jennifer Brady (Brazil) Luisa Stefani	6–4, 6–1
Wheelchair Men's Singles Semifinals	(United Kingdom) Alfie Hewett [2]	(Argentina) Gustavo Fernández [3]	6–0, 6–1
Wheelchair Men's Singles Semifinals	(United Kingdom) Gordon Reid	(France) Stéphane Houdet	6–0, 6–3
Wheelchair Women's Singles Semifinals	(Netherlands) Diede de Groot [1]	(Japan) Momoko Ohtani [4]	6–3, 6–1
Colored background indicates a night match
Matches start at 12 pm, night session starts at 7pm Eastern Daylight Time (EDT)

== Day 13 (September 9) ==
- Seeds out:
  - Women's Singles: Aryna Sabalenka [2]
  - Mixed Doubles: (United States) Jessica Pegula / (United States) Austin Krajicek [1]
- Schedule of Play

Matches on main courts
Matches on Arthur Ashe Stadium
Event	Winner	Loser	Score
Mixed Doubles Final	(Kazakhstan) Anna Danilina (Finland) Harri Heliövaara	(United States) Jessica Pegula [1] (United States) Austin Krajicek [1]	6–3, 6–4
Women's Singles Final	(United States) Coco Gauff [6]	Aryna Sabalenka [2]	2–6, 6–3, 6–2
Matches on Louis Armstrong Stadium
Event	Winner	Loser	Score
Wheelchair Men's Doubles Final	(France) Stéphane Houdet (Japan) Takashi Sanada	(Japan) Takuya Miki (Japan) Tokito Oda	6–4, 6–4
Wheelchair Quad Doubles Final	(Netherlands) Sam Schröder [1] (Netherlands) Niels Vink [1]	(United Kingdom) Andy Lapthorne (South Africa) Donald Ramphadi	6–1, 6–2
Wheelchair Junior Boys' Final	(United Kingdom) Dahnon Ward	(Italy) Francesco Felici [1]	6–4, 6–3
Wheelchair Junior Boys' Doubles Final	(United Kingdom) Joshua Johns (United Kingdom) Dahnon Ward	(United States) Charlie Cooper (United States) Tomas Majetic	6–0, 6–3
Wheelchair Women's Doubles Final	(Japan) Yui Kamiji [2] (South Africa) Kgothatso Montjane [2]	(Netherlands) Diede de Groot [1] (Netherlands) Jiske Griffioen [1]	walkover
Matches start at 12 pm Eastern Daylight Time (EDT)

== Day 14 (September 10) ==
- Seeds out:
  - Men's Singles: Daniil Medvedev [3]
  - Women's Doubles: (Germany) Laura Siegemund / Vera Zvonareva [12]
- Schedule of Play

Matches on main courts
Matches on Arthur Ashe Stadium
Event	Winner	Loser	Score
Women's Doubles Final	(Canada) Gabriela Dabrowski [16] (New Zealand) Erin Routliffe [16]	(Germany) Laura Siegemund [12] Vera Zvonareva [12]	7–6^{(11–9)}, 6–3
Men's Singles Final	(Serbia) Novak Djokovic [2]	Daniil Medvedev [3]	6–3, 7–6^{(7–5)}, 6–3
Matches on Louis Armstrong Stadium
Event	Winner	Loser	Score
Wheelchair Women's Singles Final	(Netherlands) Diede de Groot [1]	(Japan) Yui Kamiji [2]	6–2, 6–2
Wheelchair Men's Singles Final	(United Kingdom) Alfie Hewett [2]	(United Kingdom) Gordan Reid	6–4, 6–3
Wheelchair Quad Singles Final	(Netherlands) Sam Schröder [2]	(Netherlands) Niels Vink [1]	6–3, 7–5
Matches start at 1 pm (Arthur Ashe Stadium) and 12pm (Louis Armstrong Stadium) Eastern Daylight Time (EDT)
