= 2023 US Open – Wheelchair girls' doubles =

Tennis championship

Wheelchair girls' doubles
- 2023 US Open

Final
- Champion: (France) Ksénia Chasteau (United States) Maylee Phelps
- Runner-up: (United States) Sabina Czauz (Japan) Yuma Takamuro
- Score: 7–5, 6–0

Details
- Draw: 4
- Seeds: 2

Events
Singles	men	women		boys	girls
Doubles	men	women	mixed	boys	girls
WC Singles	men	women	quad	boys	girls
WC Doubles	men	women	quad	boys	girls
- US Open

No. 1 seeds Ksénia Chasteau and Maylee Phelps claimed the 2023 US Open wheelchair girls' doubles title, defeating Sabina Czauz and Yuma Takamuro.

== Seeds ==
1. (France) Ksénia Chasteau / (Brazil) (United States) Maylee Phelps (champions)
2. (Belgium) Luna Gryp / (Japan) Rio Okano (semifinals)

== Draw ==
Key

- Q = Qualifier
- WC = Wild card
- LL = Lucky loser
- Alt = Alternate
- ITF = ITF entry
- PR = Protected ranking
- SR = Special ranking
- SE = Special exempt
- JE = Junior exempt
- JR = Junior Accelerator Programme entrant
- CO = College Accelerator Programme entrant
- NG = Next Gen Accelerator Program entrant
- w/o = Walkover
- r = Retired
- d = Defaulted

=== Finals ===
Semifinals
1	(France) Ksénia Chasteau (United States) Maylee Phelps	6	6
(Brazil) Vitória Miranda (Netherlands) Isa Schogt	1	0
(United States) Sabina Czauz (Japan) Yuma Takamuro	7	6
2	(Belgium) Luna Gryp (Japan) Rio Okano	5	2

Final
1	(Belgium) Luna Gryp (Brazil) Vitória Miranda	7	6
2	(United States) Sabina Czauz (Japan) Yuma Takamuro	5	0
