= 2023 US Open – Wheelchair girls' singles =

Tennis championship

Wheelchair girls' singles
- 2023 US Open

Final
- Champion: (France) Ksénia Chasteau
- Runner-up: (United States) Maylee Phelps
- Score: 7–5, 6–0

Details
- Draw: 8
- Seeds: 2

Events
Singles	men	women		boys	girls
Doubles	men	women	mixed	boys	girls
WC Singles	men	women	quad	boys	girls
WC Doubles	men	women	quad	boys	girls
- US Open

No. 2 seed Ksénia Chasteau pulled an upset, 6-3, 6-1, over No. 1 seed Maylee Phelps to take home the junior wheelchair girls' singles title in the 2023 US Open Wheelchair Championships at the USTA Billie Jean King National Tennis Center.

== Seeds ==
1. (United States) Maylee Phelps (final)
2. (France) Ksénia Chasteau (champion)

== Draw ==
Key

- Q = Qualifier
- WC = Wild card
- LL = Lucky loser
- Alt = Alternate
- ITF = ITF entry
- PR = Protected ranking
- SR = Special ranking
- SE = Special exempt
- JE = Junior exempt
- JR = Junior Accelerator Programme entrant
- CO = College Accelerator Programme entrant
- NG = Next Gen Accelerator Program entrant
- w/o = Walkover
- r = Retired
- d = Defaulted

=== Draw ===
Quarterfinals
1	(United States) Maylee Phelps	6	6
(Japan) Yuma Takamuro	0	3
(Belgium) Luna Gryp	6	6^{7}	6
(United States) Sabina Czauz	1	7^{9}	4
(Japan) Rio Okano	6	6
(Brazil) Vitória Miranda	4	1
(Netherlands) Isa Schogt	0	1
2	(France) Ksénia Chasteau	6	6

Semifinals
1	(Brazil) Maylee Phelps	6	6
(Belgium) Luna Gryp	0	1
(Japan) Rio Okano	0	3
2	(France) Ksénia Chasteau	6	6

Final
1	(United States) Maylee Phelps	5	0
2	(France) Ksénia Chasteau	7	6
