= 2023 US Open – Wheelchair boys' doubles =

Tennis championship

Wheelchair boys' doubles
- 2023 US Open

Final
- Champions: (United Kingdom) Joshua Johns (United Kingdom) Dahnon Ward
- Runners-up: (United States) Charlie Cooper (United States) Tomas Majetic
- Score: 6–0, 6–3

Details
- Draw: 4
- Seeds: 2

Events
Singles	men	women		boys	girls
Doubles	men	women	mixed	boys	girls
WC Singles	men	women	quad	boys	girls
WC Doubles	men	women	quad	boys	girls
- US Open

Young Brit Dahnon Ward and fellow countryman Joshua Johns closed out a comfortable 6–0, 6–3 win over American duo Charlie Cooper and Tomas Majetic to win the 2023 Wheelchair Boys' Doubles title at the US Open.

Ward has now won the junior wheelchair boys’ doubles title for the second successive year, while for Johns, it's his first junior Grand Slam trophy.

== Seeds ==
1. (Italy) Francisco Felici / (Austria) Maximilian Taucher (semifinals)
2. (Netherlands) Ivar van Rijt / (Australia) Benjamin Wenzel (semifinals)

== Draw ==
Key

- Q = Qualifier
- WC = Wild card
- LL = Lucky loser
- Alt = Alternate
- ITF = ITF entry
- PR = Protected ranking
- SR = Special ranking
- SE = Special exempt
- JE = Junior exempt
- JR = Junior Accelerator Programme entrant
- CO = College Accelerator Programme entrant
- NG = Next Gen Accelerator Program entrant
- w/o = Walkover
- r = Retired
- d = Defaulted

=== Finals ===
Semifinals
1	(Italy) Francisco Felici (Austria) Maximilian Taucher	6^{5}	6	[8]
(United States) Charlie Cooper (United States) Tomas Majetic	7^{7}	3	[10]
(United Kingdom) Joshua Johns (United Kingdom) Dahnon Ward	7^{7}	6
2	(Netherlands) Ivar van Rijt (Australia) Benjamin Wenzel	6^{5}	1

Final
(United States) Charlie Cooper (United States) Tomas Majetic	0	3
2	(United Kingdom) Joshua Johns (United Kingdom) Dahnon Ward	6	6
