= 2023 US Open – Wheelchair boys' singles =

Tennis championship

Wheelchair boys' singles
- 2023 US Open

Final
- Champion: (United Kingdom) Dahnon Ward
- Runner-up: (Italy) Francesco Felici
- Score: 6–4, 6–3

Details
- Draw: 8
- Seeds: 2

Events
Singles	men	women		boys	girls
Doubles	men	women	mixed	boys	girls
WC Singles	men	women	quad	boys	girls
WC Doubles	men	women	quad	boys	girls
- US Open

A runner-up at the inaugural boys' singles event in the US Open Wheelchair Championships in 2022, Great Britain's Dahnon Ward took home the big trophy in 2023 with a 6–4, 6–3 win over top-seeded Italian Francesco Felici.

== Seeds ==
1. (Italy) Francesco Felici (final)
2. (Austria) Maximilian Taucher (quarterfinals)

== Draw ==
Key

- Q = Qualifier
- WC = Wild card
- LL = Lucky loser
- Alt = Alternate
- ITF = ITF entry
- PR = Protected ranking
- SR = Special ranking
- SE = Special exempt
- JE = Junior exempt
- JR = Junior Accelerator Programme entrant
- CO = College Accelerator Programme entrant
- NG = Next Gen Accelerator Program entrant
- w/o = Walkover
- r = Retired
- d = Defaulted

=== Draw ===
Quarterfinals
1	(Italy) Francesco Felici	4	6	6
WC	(United States) Tomas Majetic	6	3	2
(United Kingdom) Joshua Johns	4	4
(United States) Charlie Cooper	6	6
(United Kingdom) Dahnon Ward	6	6^{4}	6
(Netherlands) Ivar van Rijt	1	7^{7}	4
(Australia) Benjamin Wenzel	5	1
2	(Austria) Maximilian Taucher	7	6

Semifinals
1	(Italy) Francesco Felici	6	6
(United States) Charlie Cooper	0	3
(United Kingdom) Dahnon Ward	6	6
2	(Austria) Maximilian Taucher	1	3

Final
1	(Italy) Francesco Felici	4	3
(United Kingdom) Dahnon Ward	6	6
