= 2023 US Open – Girls' singles =

Girls' singles
- 2023 US Open

Final
- Champion: (United States) Katherine Hui
- Runner-up: (Czech Republic) Tereza Valentová
- Score: 6–4, 6–4

Events
Singles	men	women		boys	girls
Doubles	men	women	mixed	boys	girls
WC Singles	men	women	quad	boys	girls
WC Doubles	men	women	quad	boys	girls
- US Open

Katherine Hui won the girls' singles title at the 2023 US Open, defeating Tereza Valentová in the final, 6–4, 6–4. Hui won the tournament without losing a set.

Alex Eala was the reigning champion, but chose not to participate.

== Seeds ==
1. (Slovakia) Renáta Jamrichová (semifinals)
2. (Peru) Lucciana Pérez Alarcón (second round)
3. (Japan) Sayaka Ishii (third round)
4. (Japan) Sara Saito (quarterfinals)
5. (Japan) Mayu Crossley (withdrew)
6. (Japan) Ena Koike (quarterfinals)
7. (United States) Kaitlin Quevedo (third round)
8. (United States) Iva Jovic (first round)
9. (Czech Republic) Tereza Valentová (final)
10. (Czech Republic) Laura Samsonová (semifinals)
11. Anastasiia Gureva (quarterfinals)
12. (Australia) Emerson Jones (first round)
13. (Czech Republic) Alena Kovačková (second round)
14. (Serbia) Teodora Kostović (second round)
15. (Denmark) Rebecca Munk Mortensen (first round)
16. (Spain) Charo Esquiva Banuls (third round)

Click on the seed number of a player to go to their draw section.

== Draw ==
Key

- Q = Qualifier
- WC = Wild card
- LL = Lucky loser
- Alt = Alternate
- ITF = ITF entry
- PR = Protected ranking
- SR = Special ranking
- SE = Special exempt
- JE = Junior exempt
- JR = Junior Accelerator Programme entrant
- CO = College Accelerator Programme entrant
- NG = Next Gen Accelerator Program entrant
- w/o = Walkover
- r = Retired
- d = Defaulted

=== Finals ===
Quarterfinals
1	(Slovakia) Renáta Jamrichová	6	6
11	Anastasiia Gureva	4	4
4	(Japan) Sara Saito	2	4
9	(Czech Republic) Tereza Valentová	6	6
10	(Czech Republic) Laura Samsonová	6	3
(United Kingdom) Hannah Klugman	0	0^{r}
6	(Japan) Ena Koike	0	3
WC	(United States) Katherine Hui	6	6

Semifinals
1	(Slovakia) Renáta Jamrichová	6	4	3
9	(Czech Republic) Tereza Valentová	3	6	6
10	(Czech Republic) Laura Samsonová	2	3
WC	(United States) Katherine Hui	6	6

Final
9	(Czech Republic) Tereza Valentová	4	4
WC	(United States) Katherine Hui	6	6

=== Top half ===
==== Section 1 ====
First round
1	(Slovakia) Renáta Jamrichová	6	6
(Australia) Maya Joint	1	1
Q	(United States) Jessica Bernales	1	3
Q	(Japan) Nanaka Sato	6	6
Q	(Italy) Noemi Basiletti	4	6	2
(United States) Alanis Hamilton	6	4	3^{r}
(Czech Republic) Nikola Bartůňková	6	3	6
15	(Denmark) Rebecca Munk Mortensen	4	6	1
11	Anastasiia Gureva	6	4	6
(Germany) Sonja Zhiyenbayeva	4	6	0
Q	(United States) Olivia Center	3	6	6
(Poland) Monika Stankiewicz	6	4	2
WC	(United States) Valerie Glozman	6	4
(United Kingdom) Ella McDonald	1	1^{r}
WC	(United States) Akasha Urhobo	6	7^{7}
LL	(Poland) Olivia Bergler	4	6^{4}

Second round
1	(Slovakia) R Jamrichová	6	6
Q	(Japan) N Sato	1	1
Q	(Italy) N Basiletti	3	7	1
(Czech Republic) N Bartůňková	6	5	6
11	A Gureva	7^{7}	6
Q	(United States) O Center	6^{2}	1
WC	(United States) V Glozman	7^{7}	7
WC	(United States) A Urhobo	6^{4}	5

Third round
1	(Slovakia) R Jamrichová	6	6
(Czech Republic) N Bartůňková	4	3
11	A Gureva	6	5	7
WC	(United States) V Glozman	3	7	5

Quarterfinals
1	(Slovakia) R Jamrichová	6	6
11	A Gureva	4	4

==== Section 2 ====
First round
4	(Japan) Sara Saito	6	6
(Italy) Alessandra Teodosescu	3	4
(United States) Ariana Anazagasty-Pursoo	4	1
(Bulgaria) Rositsa Dencheva	6	6
(United States) Tatum Evans	0	3
Kristiana Sidorova	6	6
WC	(United States) Christasha McNeil	3	7	5
16	(Spain) Charo Esquiva Bañuls	6	5	7
9	(Czech Republic) Tereza Valentová	6	6
(Australia) Lily Taylor	0	3
(Argentina) Luciana Moyano	4	2
WC	(United States) Anita Tu	6	6
Q	(United Kingdom) Mika Stojsavljevic	0	6	6
(Japan) Wakana Sonobe	6	4	4
(Romania) Cara Maria Meșter	3	1
7	(United States) Kaitlin Quevedo	6	6

Second round
4	(Japan) S Saito	6	6
(Bulgaria) R Dencheva	1	2
K Sidorova	6^{4}	4
16	(Spain) C Esquiva Bañuls	7^{7}	6
9	(Czech Republic) T Valentová	6	6
WC	(United States) A Tu	0	2
Q	(United Kingdom) M Stojsavljevic	3	6	3
7	(United States) K Quevedo	6	3	6

Third round
4	(Japan) S Saito	6	6
16	(Spain) C Esquiva Banuls	1	4
9	(Czech Republic) T Valentová	2	6	6
7	(United States) K Quevedo	6	3	2

Quarterfinals
4	(Japan) S Saito	2	4
9	(Czech Republic) T Valentová	6	6

=== Bottom half ===
==== Section 3 ====
First round
8	(United States) Iva Jovic	6^{5}	6	4
(Morocco) Aya El Aouni	7^{7}	3	6
(Japan) Hayu Kinoshita	0	2
(Slovenia) Ela Nala Milić	6	6
(United States) Alexia Harmon	6	6
Ekaterina Perelygina	4	2
Q	(United States) Shannon Lam	3	6	5
10	(Czech Republic) Laura Samsonová	6	4	7
14	(Serbia) Teodora Kostović	4	6	6
(Italy) Francesca Pace	6	3	2
(United Kingdom) Hannah Klugman	6	6
WC	(United States) Kristina Penickova	2	2
(Bulgaria) Iva Ivanova	2	4
WC	(United States) Victoria Osuigwe	6	6
Q	(United States) Annika Penickova	3	6	3
3	(Japan) Sayaka Ishii	6	3	6

Second round
(Morocco) A El Aouni	3	4
(Slovenia) EN Milić	6	6
(United States) A Harmon	0	1
10	(Czech Republic) L Samsonová	6	6
14	(Serbia) T Kostović	4	4
(United Kingdom) H Klugman	6	6
WC	(United States) V Osuigwe	6	3	4
3	(Japan) S Ishii	2	6	6

Third round
(Slovenia) EN Milić	4	1
10	(Czech Republic) L Samsonová	6	6
(United Kingdom) H Klugman	6	6
3	(Japan) S Ishii	4	1

Quarterfinals
10	(Czech Republic) L Samsonová	6	3
(United Kingdom) H Klugman	0	0^{r}

==== Section 4 ====
First round
6	(Japan) Ena Koike	7	6
(United States) Tyra Caterina Grant	5	3
(Bulgaria) Elizara Yaneva	6	6
(United States) Mia Slama	3	1
Alisa Oktiabreva	4	1
WC	(United States) Aspen Schuman	6	6
(United Kingdom) Mingge Xu	7^{7}	2	6
12	(Australia) Emerson Jones	6^{4}	6	1
13	(Czech Republic) Alena Kovačková	7	6
(Romania) Mara Gae	5	2
(Poland) Zuzanna Pawlikowska	6	6
(United States) Theadora Rabman	4	2
Q	(Italy) Gaia Maduzzi	2	3
WC	(United States) Katherine Hui	6	6
LL	(United States) Thea Frodin	4	0
2	(Peru) Lucciana Pérez Alarcón	6	6

Second round
6	(Japan) E Koike	7^{10}	6
(Bulgaria) E Yaneva	6^{8}	4
WC	(United States) A Schuman	6	2	6
(United Kingdom) M Xu	3	6	3
13	(Czech Republic) A Kovačková	6^{4}	3
(Poland) Z Pawlikowska	7^{7}	6
WC	(United States) K Hui	6	6
2	(Peru) L Pérez Alarcón	4	0

Third round
6	(Japan) E Koike	6^{5}	6	6
WC	(United States) A Schuman	7^{7}	3	2
(Poland) Z Pawlikowska	1	0
WC	(United States) K Hui	6	6

Quarterfinals
6	(Japan) E Koike	0	3
WC	(United States) K Hui	6	6

== Qualifying ==
=== Seeds ===
1. (Benin) Gloriana Nahum (first round)
2. (Israel) Mika Buchnik (qualifying competition)
3. (Norway) Emily Sartz-Lunde (first round)
4. (Morocco) Malak El Allami (first round)
5. (Italy) Noemi Basiletti (qualified)
6. (Italy) Emma Ottavia Ghirardato (first round)
7. (Italy) Francesca Gandolfi (first round)
8. (Australia) Roisin Gilheany (first round)
9. (Israel) Liam Oved (qualifying competition)
10. (United States) Kaitlyn Rolls (qualifying competition)
11. (United States) Anya Murthy (qualifying competition)
12. (Canada) Naomi Xu (qualifying competition)
13. (Italy) Gaia Maduzzi (qualified)
14. (United Kingdom) Hephzibah Oluwadare (first round)
15. (Italy) Greta Greco Lucchina (first round)
16. (United States) Piper Charney (first round)

=== Qualifiers ===
1. (United Kingdom) Mika Stojsavljevic
2. (United States) Jessica Bernales
3. (Japan) Nanaka Sato
4. (United States) Shannon Lam
5. (Italy) Noemi Basiletti
6. (United States) Annika Penickova
7. (United States) Olivia Center
8. (Italy) Gaia Maduzzi

=== Lucky losers ===
1. (Poland) Olivia Bergler
2. (United States) Thea Frodin

=== Draw ===
==== First qualifier ====
First round
1	(Benin) Gloriana Nahum	6	6^{5}	[7]
(United Kingdom) Mika Stojsavljevic	4	7^{7}	[10]
WC	(United States) Julieta Pareja	6	7
15	(Italy) Greta Greco Lucchina	0	5

Qualifying competition
(United Kingdom) Mika Stojsavljevic	6	7^{13}
WC	(United States) Julieta Pareja	4	6^{11}

==== Second qualifier ====
First round
2	(Israel) Mika Buchnik	7^{7}	4	[10]
(Japan) Nao Nishino	6^{2}	6	[6]
(United States) Jessica Bernales	6	6
14	(United Kingdom) Hephzibah Oluwadare	2	2

Qualifying competition
2	(Israel) Mika Buchnik	6^{5}	4
(United States) Jessica Bernales	7^{7}	6

==== Third qualifier ====
First round
3	(Norway) Emily Sartz-Lunde	6^{5}	6	[12]
WC	(Japan) Nanaka Sato	7^{7}	3	[14]
WC	(United States) Nancy Lee	2	5
12	(Canada) Naomi Xu	6	7

Qualifying competition
WC	(Japan) Nanaka Sato	6	6
12	(Canada) Naomi Xu	1	4

==== Fourth qualifier ====
First round
4	(Morocco) Malak El Allami	2	4
(United States) Shannon Lam	6	6
(China) Zhao Yichen	4	3
10	(United States) Kaitlyn Rolls	6	6

Qualifying competition
(United States) Shannon Lam	6	6
10	(United States) Kaitlyn Rolls	4	4

==== Fifth qualifier ====
First round
5	(Italy) Noemi Basiletti	6	6
WC	(United States) Capucine Jauffret	2	2
(Chile) Antonia Vergara Rivera	2	2
11	(United States) Anya Murthy	6	6

Qualifying competition
5	(Italy) Noemi Basiletti	6	6
11	(United States) Anya Murthy	2	4

==== Sixth qualifier ====
First round
6	(Italy) Emma Ottavia Ghirardato	2	0
WC	(United States) Annika Penickova	6	6
(Poland) Olivia Bergler	3	7^{7}	[10]
16	(United States) Piper Charney	6	6^{5}	[3]

Qualifying competition
WC	(United States) Annika Penickova	2	6	[10]
(Poland) Olivia Bergler	6	3	[2]

==== Seventh qualifier ====
First round
7	(Italy) Francesca Gandolfi	6	1	[3]
(United States) Olivia Center	3	6	[10]
(Ukraine) Anastasiia Firman	6^{4}	0
9	(Israel) Liam Oved	7^{7}	6

Qualifying competition
(United States) Olivia Center	7^{7}	6
9	(Israel) Liam Oved	6^{2}	2

==== Eighth qualifier ====
First round
8	(Australia) Roisin Gilheany	4	4
WC	(United States) Thea Frodin	6	6
(United States) Kate Fakih	2	3
13	(Italy) Gaia Maduzzi	6	6

Qualifying competition
WC	(United States) Thea Frodin	2	6^{5}
13	(Italy) Gaia Maduzzi	6	7^{7}
