= 2023 US Open – Girls' doubles =

Girls' doubles
- 2023 US Open

Final
- Champions: (Romania) Mara Gae; Anastasiia Gureva
- Runners-up: (Japan) Sara Saito (Japan) Nanaka Sato
- Score: 1–6, 7–5, [10–8]

Events
| Singles | men | women | | boys | girls |
| Doubles | men | women | mixed | boys | girls |
| WC Singles | men | women | quad | boys | girls |
| WC Doubles | men | women | quad | boys | girls |
- US Open

Mara Gae and Anastasiia Gureva won the girls' doubles title at the 2023 US Open, defeating Sara Saito and Nanaka Sato in the final, 1–6, 7–5, [10–8].

Lucie Havlíčková and Diana Shnaider were the reigning champions, but Shnaider was no longer eligible to participate in junior events and Havličková chose not to participate.

== Seeds ==
1. (Slovakia) Renáta Jamrichová / (United States) Kaitlin Quevedo (semifinals)
2. (Japan) Sayaka Ishii / (Japan) Ena Koike (second round)
3. Alisa Oktiabreva / (Peru) Lucciana Pérez Alarcón (first round)
4. (Czech Republic) Alena Kovačková / (Czech Republic) Laura Samsonová (quarterfinals, withdrew)
5. (United States) Tyra Caterina Grant / (United States) Iva Jovic (first round)
6. (Czech Republic) Nikola Bartůňková / (Czech Republic) Tereza Valentová (second round)
7. (Spain) Charo Esquiva Banuls / (Australia) Emerson Jones (second round)
8. (Romania) Mara Gae / Anastasiia Gureva (champions)

== Draw ==
Key

- Q = Qualifier
- WC = Wild card
- LL = Lucky loser
- Alt = Alternate
- ITF = ITF entry
- PR = Protected ranking
- SR = Special ranking
- SE = Special exempt
- JE = Junior exempt
- JR = Junior Accelerator Programme entrant
- CO = College Accelerator Programme entrant
- NG = Next Gen Accelerator Program entrant
- w/o = Walkover
- r = Retired
- d = Defaulted

=== Finals ===
Semifinals
1 | (Slovakia) Renáta Jamrichová (United States) Kaitlin Quevedo | 2 | 3
(Japan) Sara Saito (Japan) Nanaka Sato | 6 | 6
(Japan) Hayu Kinoshita (Japan) Wakana Sonobe | 6 | 3 | [7]
8 | (Romania) Mara Gae; Anastasiia Gureva | 2 | 6 | [10]

Final
(Japan) Sara Saito (Japan) Nanaka Sato | 6 | 5 | [8]
8 | (Romania) Mara Gae; Anastasiia Gureva | 1 | 7 | [10]

=== Top half ===
First round
1 | (Slovakia) Renáta Jamrichová (United States) Kaitlin Quevedo | 2 | 6 | [10]
(Romania) Cara Maria Meșter (Australia) Lily Taylor | 6 | 1 | [0]
WC | (United States) Akasha Urhobo (United States) Mia Yamakita | 2 | 7^{7} | [8]
(United States) Ariana Anazagasty-Pursoo (Australia) Maya Joint | 6 | 6^{3} | [10]
Ekaterina Perelygina (Norway) Emily Sartz-Lunde | 1 | 1
(United Kingdom) Hannah Klugman (United Kingdom) Mingge Xu | 6 | 6
WC | (United States) Thea Frodin (United States) Anita Tu | 7 | 5 | [14]
7 | (Spain) Charo Esquiva Bañuls (Australia) Emerson Jones | 5 | 7 | [16]
3 | Alisa Oktiabreva (Peru) Lucciana Pérez Alarcón | 2 | 7 | [5]
(United States) Shannon Lam (United Kingdom) Mika Stojsavljevic | 6 | 5 | [10]
(United States) Victoria Osuigwe (United States) Theadora Rabman | 6^{3} | 5
(Japan) Sara Saito (Japan) Nanaka Sato | 7^{7} | 7
(Denmark) Rebecca Munk Mortensen; Kristiana Sidorova | 3 | 5
WC | (United States) Annika Penickova (United States) Kristina Penickova | 6 | 7
(Italy) Noemi Basiletti (Italy) Gaia Maduzzi | 2 | 2
6 | (Czech Republic) Nikola Bartůňková (Czech Republic) Tereza Valentová | 6 | 6

Second round
1 | (Slovakia) R Jamrichová (United States) K Quevedo | 7 | 6
(United States) A Anazagasty-Pursoo (Australia) M Joint | 5 | 3
(United Kingdom) H Klugman (United Kingdom) M Xu | 6 | 6
7 | (Spain) C Esquiva Banuls (Australia) E Jones | 0 | 1
(United States) S Lam (United Kingdom) M Stojsavljevic | 5 | 6 | [7]
(Japan) S Saito (Japan) N Sato | 7 | 4 | [10]
WC | (United States) A Penickova (United States) K Penickova | 5 | 6 | [10]
6 | (Czech Republic) N Bartůňková (Czech Republic) T Valentová | 7 | 2 | [5]

Quarterfinals
1 | (Slovakia) R Jamrichová (United States) K Quevedo | w/o
(United Kingdom) H Klugman (United Kingdom) M Xu
(Japan) S Saito (Japan) N Sato | 7^{7} | 6
WC | (United States) A Penickova (United States) K Penickova | 6^{1} | 0

Semifinals
1 | (Slovakia) R Jamrichová (United States) K Quevedo | 2 | 3
(Japan) S Saito (Japan) N Sato | 6 | 6

=== Bottom half ===
First round
5 | (United States) Tyra Caterina Grant (United States) Iva Jovic | 6 | 2 | [13]
(Serbia) Teodora Kostović (Benin) Gloriana Nahum | 3 | 6 | [15]
(Italy) Francesca Pace (Italy) Alessandra Teodosescu | 5 | 3
(Japan) Hayu Kinoshita (Japan) Wakana Sonobe | 7 | 6
(Bulgaria) Iva Ivanova (Germany) Sonja Zhiyenbayeva | 2 | 6 | [12]
(Poland) Olivia Bergler (Australia) Roisin Gilheany | 6 | 3 | [10]
(United States) Alexia Harmon (United States) Mia Slama | 2 | 1
4 | (Czech Republic) Alena Kovačková (Czech Republic) Laura Samsonová | 6 | 6
8 | (Romania) Mara Gae; Anastasiia Gureva | 6 | 7
(Poland) Zuzanna Pawlikowska (Poland) Monika Stankiewicz | 2 | 5
WC | (United States) Olivia Center (United States) Kate Fakih | 7^{12} | 7
(Slovenia) Ela Nala Milić (Argentina) Luciana Moyano | 6^{10} | 5
(United States) Tatum Evans (United States) Alanis Hamilton | 7 | 1 | [13]
(Morocco) Malak El Allami (Morocco) Aya El Aouni | 5 | 6 | [11]
(Bulgaria) Rositsa Dencheva (Bulgaria) Elizara Yaneva | 7^{8} | 4 | [5]
2 | (Japan) Sayaka Ishii (Japan) Ena Koike | 6^{6} | 6 | [10]

Second round
(Serbia) T Kostović (Benin) G Nahum | 1 | 4
(Japan) H Kinoshita (Japan) W Sonobe | 6 | 6
(Bulgaria) I Ivanova (Germany) S Zhiyenbayeva | 3 | 1
4 | (Czech Republic) A Kovačková (Czech Republic) L Samsonová | 6 | 6
8 | (Romania) M Gae; A Gureva | 7^{7} | 6
WC | (United States) O Center (United States) K Fakih | 6^{1} | 4
(United States) T Evans (United States) A Hamilton | 6 | 7
2 | (Japan) S Ishii (Japan) E Koike | 4 | 5

Quarterfinals
(Japan) H Kinoshita (Japan) W Sonobe | w/o
4 | (Czech Republic) A Kovačková (Czech Republic) L Samsonová
8 | (Romania) M Gae; A Gureva | 6 | 7
(United States) T Evans (United States) A Hamilton | 4 | 5

Semifinals
(Japan) H Kinoshita (Japan) W Sonobe | 6 | 3 | [7]
8 | (Romania) M Gae; A Gureva | 2 | 6 | [10]
