= Anastasiia Gureva =

Russian tennis player (born 2005)

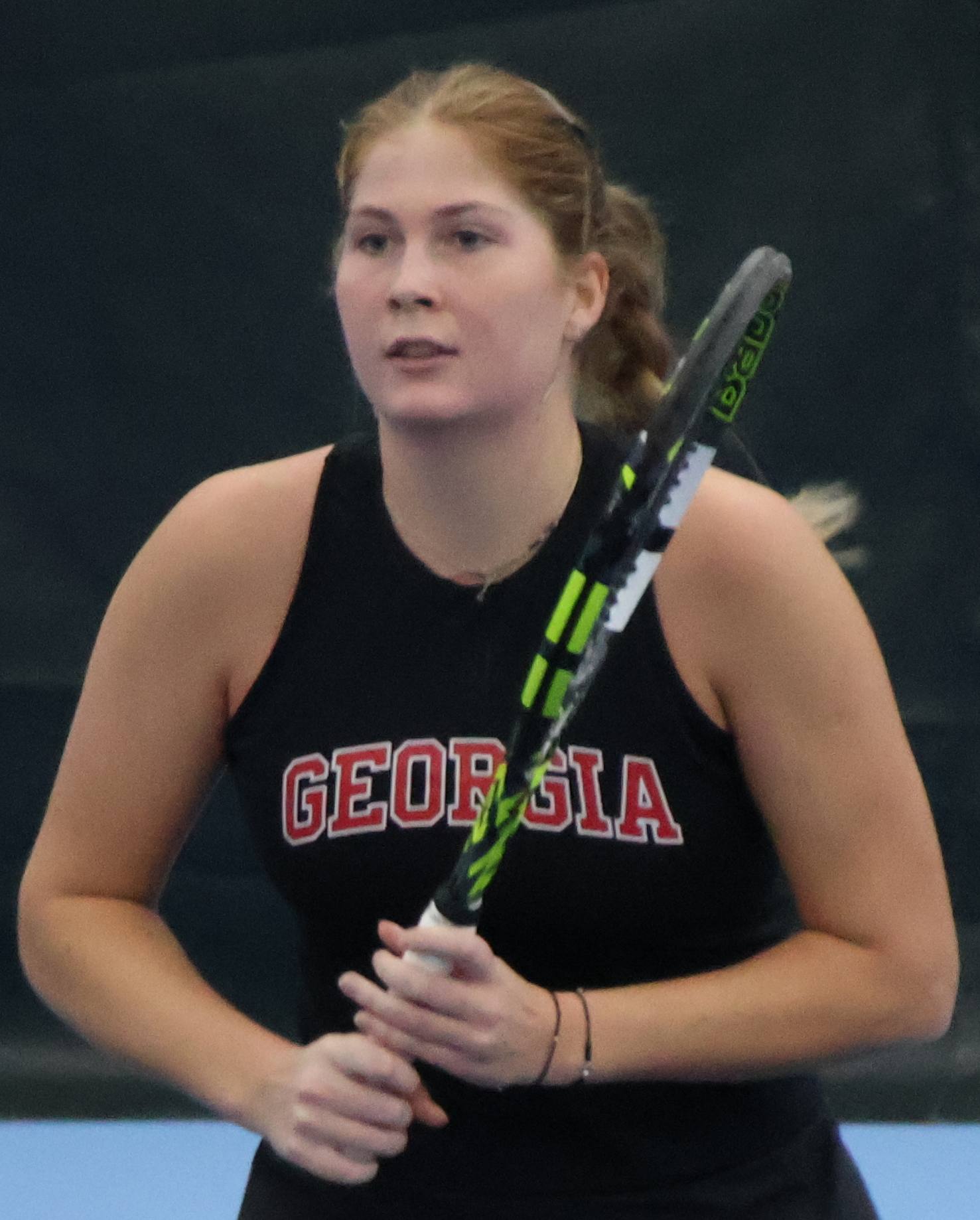
- Gureva with Georgia in 2026
- Full name: Anastasiia Viacheslavovna Gureva
- Country (sports): Russia
- Born: 24 March 2005 (age 21) Samara, Russia
- Plays: Right-handed
- Prize money: $66,896

Singles
- Career record: 116–71
- Career titles: 5 ITF
- Highest ranking: No. 342 (29 July 2024)

Doubles
- Career record: 91–44
- Career titles: 11 ITF
- Highest ranking: No. 208 (21 October 2024)
- Last updated on: 15 September 2026.

Anastasiia Viacheslavovna Gureva (Russian: Анастасия Вячеславовна Гурьева, born 24 March 2005) is a Russian inactive tennis player. She has a career-high WTA singles ranking of No. 342, achieved on 29 July 2024 and a doubles ranking of No. 208, achieved in October 2024.

Gureva and her partner Mara Gae won the 2023 US Open Junior doubles title defeating Sara Saito and Nanaka Sato in the final.

== ITF Circuit finals ==
=== Singles: 9 (5 titles, 4 runner-ups) ===
Legend W50 tournaments (1–0) W25 tournaments (1–0) W15 tournaments (3–4)	Finals by surface Hard (5–3) Clay (0–1)

Result	W–L	Date	Tournament	Tier	Surface	Opponent	Score
Loss	0–1	Jun 2022	ITF Bucharest, Romania	W15	Clay	(Germany) Chantal Sauvant	7–6^{(4)}, 3–6, 2–6
Loss	0–2	Jul 2022	ITF Monastir, Tunisia	W15	Hard	(Indonesia) Priska Madelyn Nugroho	2–6, 1–6
Win	1–2	Oct 2022	ITF Sharm El Sheikh, Egypt	W15	Hard	(Lithuania) Andrė Lukošiūtė	6–3, 6–1
Loss	1–3	Oct 2022	ITF Sharm El Sheikh, Egypt	W15	Hard	Elena Pridankina	7–6^{(5)}, 4–6, 6–7^{(2)}
Loss	1–4	Nov 2022	ITF Monastir, Tunisia	W15	Hard	(Belgium) Hanne Vandewinkel	2–6, 1–6
Win	2–4	Aug 2023	ITF Monastir, Tunisia	W15	Hard	(United States) Victoria Flores	6–2, 3–6, 6–1
Win	3–4	Oct 2023	ITF Qiandaohu, China	W25	Hard	(China) Wei Sijia	2–6, 7–6^{(6)}, 6–3
Win	4–4	Mar 2024	Trnava Indoor, Slovakia	W50	Hard (i)	Elena Pridankina	3–6, 6–3, 6–4
Win	5–4	Apr 2025	ITF Monastir, Tunisia	W15	Hard	(India) Zeel Desai	6–0, 2–0 ret.

=== Doubles: 17 (11 titles, 6 runner-ups) ===
Legend W50 tournaments (1–1) W25 tournaments (3–0) W15 tournaments (7–5)	Finals by surface Hard (7–5) Clay (4–1)

Result	W–L	Date	Tournament	Tier	Surface	Partner	Opponents	Score
Win	1–0	Jun 2022	ITF Norges-la-Ville, France	W15	Clay	(Argentina) Luciana Moyano	Natalia Orlova (France) Lucie Wargnier	6–0, 6–0
Win	2–0	Jul 2022	ITF Casablanca, Morocco	W15	Clay	(France) Laïa Petretic	(Spain) Paula Arias Manjón (Switzerland) Marie Mettraux	6–1, 6–2
Win	3–0	Jul 2022	ITF Casablanca, Morocco	W15	Clay	(Finland) Laura Hietaranta	(Switzerland) Marie Mettraux (Italy) Federica Prati	6–2, 6–2
Loss	3–1	Jul 2022	ITF Monastir, Tunisia	W15	Hard	(Greece) Michaela Laki	(Indonesia) Priska Madelyn Nugroho (China) Wei Sijia	2–6, 6–4, [5–10]
Win	4–1	Oct 2022	ITF Sharm El Sheikh, Egypt	W15	Hard	(Belgium) Tilwith di Girolami	(Chinese Taipei) Cho I-hsuan (Chinese Taipei) Cho Yi-tsen	6–2, 4–6, [10–7]
Win	5–1	Oct 2022	ITF Sharm El Sheikh	W15	Hard	Elena Pridankina	(Chinese Taipei) Cho I-hsuan (Chinese Taipei) Cho Yi-tsen	6–7^{(3)}, 6–1, [10–6]
Loss	5–2	Nov 2022	ITF Monastir, Tunisia	W15	Hard	Vlada Mincheva	(Chinese Taipei) Tsao Chia-yi (Chinese Taipei) Wu Fang-hsien	3–6, 4–6
Loss	5–3	Aug 2023	ITF Monastir, Tunisia	W15	Hard	(Italy) Beatrice Stagno	Ekaterina Shalimova (Slovakia) Radka Zelníčková	7–6^{(4)}, 1–6, [8–10]
Win	6–3	Aug 2023	ITF Monastir, Tunisia	W15	Hard	(Slovakia) Radka Zelníčková	(Switzerland) Kristina Milenkovic (Egypt) Sandra Samir	6–3, 5–7, [11–9]
Win	7–3	Oct 2023	ITF Qiandaohu, China	W25	Hard	(Georgia (country)) Sofia Shapatava	(China) Feng Shuo (China) Zheng Wushuang	6–2, 4–6, [10–4]
Win	8–3	Nov 2023	ITF Limassol, Cyprus	W25	Hard	Polina Iatcenko	(United Kingdom) Katy Dunne (Switzerland) Leonie Küng	walkover
Win	9–3	Jan 2024	ITF Antalya, Turkiye	W50	Clay	Alexandra Shubladze	(Spain) Ángela Fita Boluda (Latvia) Daniela Vismane	6–3, 6–2
Loss	9–4	Jun 2024	ITF Otočec, Slovenia	W50	Clay	Anastasia Kovaleva	(Georgia (country)) Ekaterine Gorgodze (Ukraine) Valeriya Strakhova	6–4, 2–6, [4–10]
Win	10–4	Sep 2024	ITF Santarém, Portugal	W35	Hard	(Slovakia) Radka Zelníčková	(United Kingdom) Sarah Beth Grey (Slovakia) Katarína Kužmová	7–5, 6–1
Loss	10–5	Apr 2025	ITF Monastir, Tunisia	W15	Hard	(India) Zeel Desai	(Denmark) Vilma Krebs Hyllested (Denmark) Johanne Svendsen	6–0, 5–7, [5–10]
Loss	10–6	Apr 2025	ITF Monastir, Tunisia	W15	Hard	(India) Zeel Desai	(United States) Abigail Rencheli (United States) Hibah Shaikh	4–6, 2–6
Win	11–6	May 2025	ITF Monastir, Tunisia	W15	Hard	Ekaterina Khayrutdinova	(Zimbabwe) Valeria Bhunu (Tunisia) Lina Soussi	6–1, 6–1

== Junior Grand Slam final ==
=== Doubles: 1 title ===
Result	Year	Tournament	Surface	Partner	Opponents	Score
Win	2023	US Open	Hard	(Romania) Mara Gae	(Japan) Sara Saito (Japan) Nanaka Sato	1–6, 7–5, [10–8]
