= Takashi Sanada =

Japanese wheelchair tennis player

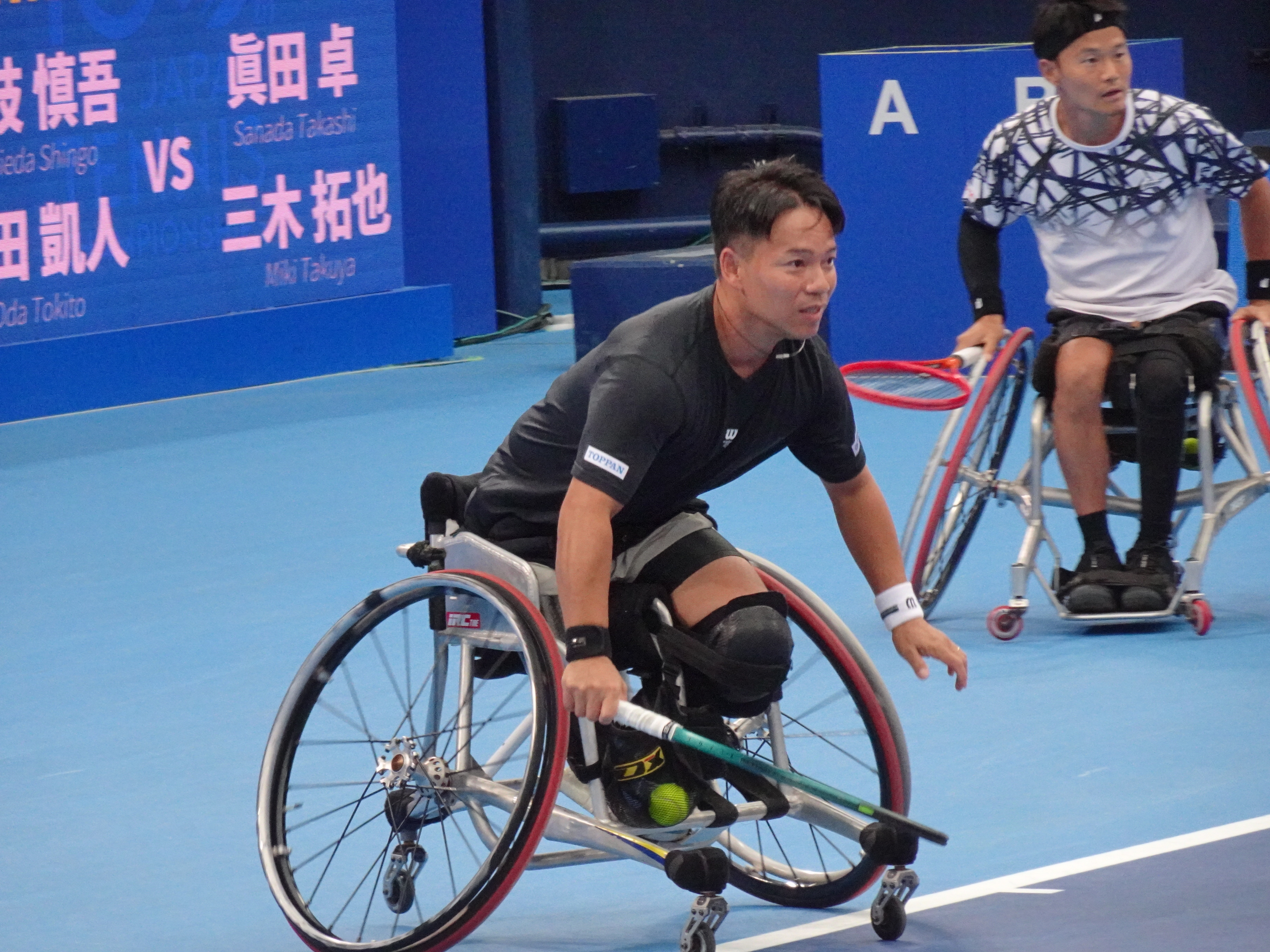
- Sanada at 100th All Japan Tennis Championships in Tokyo, Japan, 2025
- Country (sports): Japan
- Residence: Saitama, Saitama, Japan
- Born: June 8, 1985 (age 41) Nasushiobara, Tochigi, Japan

Singles
- Current ranking: No. 8 (April 9, 2018)

Grand Slam singles results
- Australian Open: QF (2023, 2025)
- French Open: 1R (2023, 2024)
- Wimbledon: 1R (2024)
- US Open: 1R (2023)

Grand Slam doubles results
- Australian Open: SF (2023, 2024)
- French Open: SF (2023)
- Wimbledon: QF (2024)
- US Open: W (2023)

Takashi Sanada (眞田 卓, Sanada Takashi; born June 8, 1985) is a Paralympic tennis player from Japan who won a series of national championships such as 2011 Osaka Open, Japan Open and Peace Cup (both 2011 and 2012). He also was a winner of international championships such as Taiwan Open and the Gauteng Open in South Africa.

He won the 2023 US Open wheelchair doubles with Stéphane Houdet.

He competed in wheelchair tennis at the 2020 Summer Paralympics.
