= Ksénia Chasteau =

French wheelchair tennis player

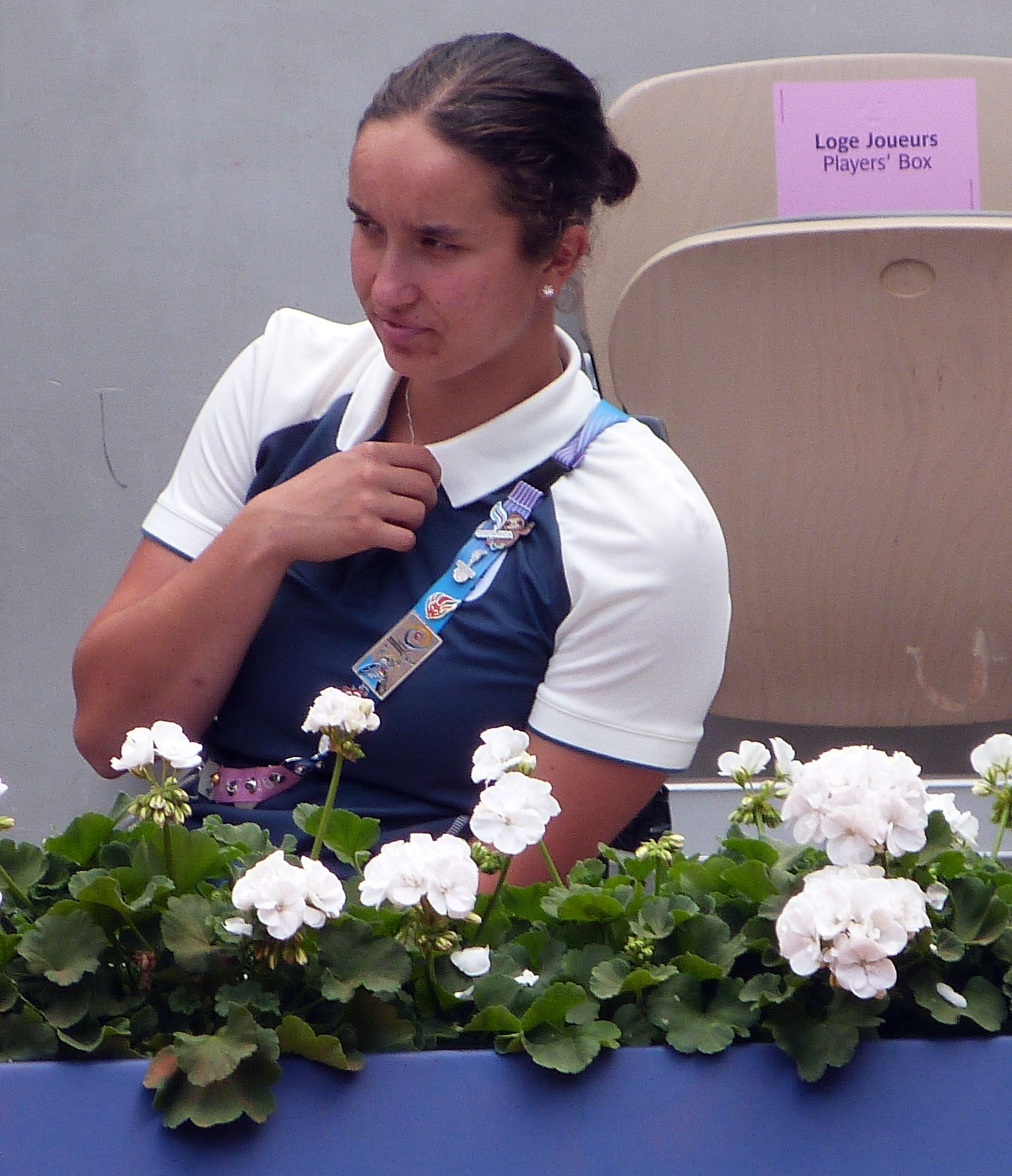
- Chasteau at 2024 Summer Paralympics
- Residence: Marseille, France
- Born: 12 March 2006 (age 20) Irkutsk, Russia
- Plays: Right-handed (one-handed backhand)

Singles
- Career titles: 12
- Highest ranking: No. 8 (6 July 2026)
- Current ranking: No. 8 (6 July 2026)

Grand Slam singles results
- Australian Open: 1R (2026)
- French Open: F (2026)
- Wimbledon: QF (2025, 2026)
- US Open: SF (2026)

Other tournaments
- Paralympic Games: 2R (2024)

Doubles
- Career titles: 11
- Highest ranking: No. 17 (4 November 2024)
- Current ranking: No. 19 (20 January 2025)

Grand Slam doubles results
- Australian Open: QF (2026)
- French Open: QF (2025, 2026)
- Wimbledon: F (2025)
- US Open: QF (2025)

Other doubles tournaments
- Paralympic Games: 1R (2024)

Ksénia Chasteau (born 12 March 2006 in Irkutsk) is a Russian-born French wheelchair tennis player. A former junior world No. 1, she was the 2023 US Open and 2024 French Open wheelchair junior singles and doubles champion with Maylee Phelps. She has also competed at the 2024 Summer Paralympics.

== Life-changing accident ==
In January 2021, Chasteau and her father were involved in a motorbike accident. Both of them had lost their left legs.

== Tennis career ==
Before her accident, Chasteau was a promising tennis player who had started the sport aged four years old in Marseille. She started wheelchair tennis in September 2021 after rehabilitation, she rocketed up the rankings and went on to reach junior world number one in 2023. In 2023 she won the US Open junior singles title. In 2024 she won the French Open junior singles title.
