= 2023 US Open – Boys' singles =

Boys' singles
- 2023 US Open

Final
- Champion: (Brazil) João Fonseca
- Runner-up: (United States) Learner Tien
- Score: 4–6, 6–4, 6–3

Events
Singles	men	women		boys	girls
Doubles	men	women	mixed	boys	girls
WC Singles	men	women	quad	boys	girls
WC Doubles	men	women	quad	boys	girls
- US Open

João Fonseca won the boys' singles title at the 2023 US Open, defeating Learner Tien in the final, 4–6, 6–4, 6–3.

Martín Landaluce was the reigning champion, but chose not to participate.

== Seeds ==
1. Yaroslav Demin (third round)
2. (Mexico) Rodrigo Pacheco Méndez (quarterfinals)
3. (United States) Cooper Williams (quarterfinals)
4. (United Kingdom) Henry Searle (second round)
5. (Bolivia) Juan Carlos Prado Ángelo (second round)
6. (Bulgaria) Iliyan Radulov (first round)
7. (Brazil) João Fonseca (champion)
8. (United States) Darwin Blanch (third round)
9. (China) Zhou Yi (quarterfinals)
10. (Serbia) Branko Djuric (first round)
11. (United States) Learner Tien (final)
12. (Poland) Tomasz Berkieta (first round)
13. (Austria) Joel Schwärzler (first round)
14. (Italy) Federico Cinà (semifinals)
15. (France) Arthur Géa (semifinals)
16. (Spain) Alejandro Melero Kretzer (first round)

Click on the seed number of a player to go to their draw section.

== Draw ==
Key

- Q = Qualifier
- WC = Wild card
- LL = Lucky loser
- Alt = Alternate
- ITF = ITF entry
- PR = Protected ranking
- SR = Special ranking
- SE = Special exempt
- JE = Junior exempt
- JR = Junior Accelerator Programme entrant
- CO = College Accelerator Programme entrant
- NG = Next Gen Accelerator Program entrant
- w/o = Walkover
- r = Retired
- d = Defaulted

=== Finals ===
Quarterfinals
14	(Italy) Federico Cinà	6	6
9	(China) Zhou Yi	2	2
3	(United States) Cooper Williams	6^{8}	6	3
7	(Brazil) João Fonseca	7^{10}	3	6
WC	(United States) Alexander Frusina	4	3
15	(France) Arthur Géa	6	6
11	(United States) Learner Tien	4	6	7
2	(Mexico) Rodrigo Pacheco Méndez	6	0	5

Semifinals
14	(Italy) Federico Cinà	4	6	4
7	(Brazil) João Fonseca	6	3	6
15	(France) Arthur Géa	6^{5}	7^{7}	1
11	(United States) Learner Tien	7^{7}	6^{5}	6

Final
7	(Brazil) João Fonseca	4	6	6
11	(United States) Learner Tien	6	4	3

=== Top half ===
==== Section 1 ====
First round
1	Yaroslav Demin	7	6
(United Kingdom) Oliver Bonding	5	4
WC	(United States) Maxwell Exsted	7^{10}	1	2
(Australia) Hayden Jones	6^{8}	6	6
Q	(India) Aryan Shah	6	3	2
(United States) Kyle Kang	4	6	6
Q	(South Korea) Park Seung-min	6^{4}	3
14	(Italy) Federico Cinà	7^{7}	6
9	(China) Zhou Yi	6	6
(Germany) Lasse Pörtner	4	3
WC	(United States) Zhengqing Ji	6	5	3
(Czech Republic) Maxim Mrva	3	7	6
(United States) Roy Horovitz	3	6	6
Q	(Turkey) Atakan Karahan	6	2	4
(Japan) Rei Sakamoto	7^{7}	6
6	(Bulgaria) Iliyan Radulov	6^{3}	4

Second round
1	Y Demin	7^{7}	6
(Australia) H Jones	6^{1}	4
(United States) K Kang	6^{5}	6	1
14	(Italy) F Cinà	7^{7}	3	6
9	(China) Y Zhou	6^{2}	6	7^{10}
(Czech Republic) M Mrva	7^{7}	2	6^{8}
(United States) R Horovitz	7^{8}	6^{3}	4
(Japan) R Sakamoto	6^{6}	7^{7}	6

Third round
1	Y Demin	3	6	6^{8}
14	(Italy) F Cinà	6	3	7^{10}
9	(China) Y Zhou	6	6
(Japan) R Sakamoto	2	4

Quarterfinals
14	(Italy) F Cinà	6	6
9	(China) Y Zhou	2	2

==== Section 2 ====
First round
3	(United States) Cooper Williams	6	6
(Italy) Gabriele Vulpitta	1	0
LL	(Estonia) Markus Mölder	6	7^{7}
(France) Paul Barbier Gazeu	4	6^{5}
WC	(United States) Adhithya Ganesan	6	6
(Sweden) Max Dahlin	2	3
(Czech Republic) Jan Hrazdil	3	6	6
16	(Spain) Alejandro Melero Kretzer	6	3	4
10	(Serbia) Branko Djuric	4	4
Q	(Italy) Fabio De Michele	6	6
WC	(United States) Matthew Forbes	6	6
(Slovenia) Matic Križnik	3	2
(Switzerland) Patrick Schön	6	6
SE	(United States) Cooper Woestendick	3	4
(Netherlands) Mees Röttgering	3	4
7	(Brazil) João Fonseca	6	6

Second round
3	(United States) C Williams	6	3	7^{10}
LL	(Estonia) M Mölder	2	6	6^{7}
WC	(United States) A Ganesan	7^{7}	7^{7}
(Czech Republic) J Hrazdil	6^{5}	6^{3}
Q	(Italy) F De Michele	7^{7}	3	6
WC	(United States) M Forbes	6^{3}	6	3
(Switzerland) P Schön	3	2
7	(Brazil) J Fonseca	6	6

Third round
3	(United States) C Williams	6	6
WC	(United States) A Ganesan	0	1
Q	(Italy) F De Michele	3	4
7	(Brazil) J Fonseca	6	6

Quarterfinals
3	(United States) C Williams	6^{8}	6	3
7	(Brazil) J Fonseca	7^{10}	3	6

=== Bottom half ===
==== Section 3 ====
First round
8	(United States) Darwin Blanch	4	6	6
(Australia) Charlie Camus	6	3	4
(Sweden) Kevin Edengren	3	6^{6}
(Estonia) Oliver Ojakäär	6	7^{8}
WC	(United States) Alexander Frusina	6	7^{7}
Q	(China) Zhang Tianhui	4	6^{2}
(Norway) Nicolai Budkov Kjær	6	6
12	(Poland) Tomasz Berkieta	4	3
15	(France) Arthur Géa	6	6
(United States) Kaylan Bigun	0	4
(Italy) Federico Bondioli	3	6	6
(Czech Republic) Jakub Filip	6	3	2
Q	(South Korea) Roh Ho-young	1	4
WC	(United States) Trevor Svajda	6	6
(India) Yuvan Nandal	6^{3}	3
4	(United Kingdom) Henry Searle	7^{7}	6

Second round
8	(United States) Dar Blanch	7^{7}	7^{8}
(Estonia) O Ojakäär	6^{4}	6^{6}
WC	(United States) A Frusina	6	6
(Norway) N Budkov Kjær	2	3
15	(France) A Géa	7^{7}	7^{7}
(Italy) F Bondioli	6^{5}	6^{5}
WC	(United States) T Svajda	7	4	6
4	(United Kingdom) H Searle	5	6	4

Third round
8	(United States) Dar Blanch	3	3
WC	(United States) A Frusina	6	6
15	(France) A Géa	6	6
WC	(United States) T Svajda	3	4

Quarterfinals
WC	(United States) A Frusina	4	3
15	(France) A Géa	6	6

==== Section 4 ====
First round
5	(Bolivia) Juan Carlos Prado Ángelo	6	6
(Argentina) Fernando Cavallo	3	4
SE	(Italy) Carlo Alberto Caniato	2	6	6
(United States) Alexander Razeghi	6	2	3
(Japan) Hayato Matsuoka	6	6^{5}	4
(Sweden) Sebastian Eriksson	4	7^{7}	6
(Netherlands) Abel Forger	2	4
11	(United States) Learner Tien	6	6
13	(Austria) Joel Schwärzler	5	6^{5}
Q	(Australia) Pavle Marinkov	7	7^{7}
WC	(United States) Cyrus Mahjoob	6^{2}	6	6^{5}
Danil Panarin	7^{7}	3	7^{10}
Q	(Spain) Rafael Jódar	2	4
WC	(United States) Nishesh Basavareddy	6	6
(South Korea) Kim Jang-jun	2	4
2	(Mexico) Rodrigo Pacheco Méndez	6	6

Second round
5	(Bolivia) JC Prado Ángelo	4	3
SE	(Italy) CA Caniato	6	6
(Sweden) S Eriksson	6^{5}	4
11	(United States) L Tien	7^{7}	6
Q	(Australia) P Marinkov	6	3	6
D Panarin	3	6	4
WC	(United States) N Basavareddy	6	3	2
2	(Mexico) R Pacheco Méndez	3	6	6

Third round
SE	(Italy) CA Caniato	4	3
11	(United States) L Tien	6	6
Q	(Australia) P Marinkov	4	4
2	(Mexico) R Pacheco Méndez	6	6

Quarterfinals
11	(United States) L Tien	4	6	7
2	(Mexico) R Pacheco Méndez	6	0	5

== Qualifying ==
=== Seeds ===
1. (Spain) Rafael Jódar (qualified)
2. (Australia) Pavle Marinkov (qualified)
3. (China) Zhang Tianhui (qualified)
4. (India) Aryan Shah (qualified)
5. (Ukraine) Volodymyr Iakubenko (qualifying competition)
6. (United Kingdom) Charlie Robertson (first round)
7. (Italy) Fabio De Michele (qualified)
8. (South Korea) Roh Ho-young (qualified)
9. (Sweden) Albert Saar (qualifying competition)
10. (Brazil) Gustavo Ribeiro de Almeida (first round)
11. (Turkey) Atakan Karahan (qualified)
12. (India) Manas Dhamne (first round)
13. (Venezuela) Ignacio Parisca (qualifying competition)
14. (Estonia) Markus Mölder (qualifying competition, lucky loser)
15. (Morocco) Ilyas Milad Fahim (first round)
16. (United Kingdom) Luca Pow (qualifying competition)

=== Qualifiers ===
1. (Spain) Rafael Jódar
2. (Australia) Pavle Marinkov
3. (China) Zhang Tianhui
4. (India) Aryan Shah
5. (Turkey) Atakan Karahan
6. (South Korea) Park Seung-min
7. (Italy) Fabio De Michele
8. (South Korea) Roh Ho-young

=== Lucky loser ===
1. (Estonia) Markus Mölder

=== Draw ===
==== First qualifier ====
First round
1	(Spain) Rafael Jódar	6	6
(Australia) Jeremy Zhang	3	4
(Brazil) Henrique Costanzi De Brito	4	4
16	(United Kingdom) Luca Pow	6	6

Qualifying competition
1	(Spain) Rafael Jódar	6	6
16	(United Kingdom) Luca Pow	4	2

==== Second qualifier ====
First round
2	(Australia) Pavle Marinkov	6	3	[11]
WC	(United States) Carel Aubriel Ngounoue	2	6	[9]
(France) Théo Papamalamis	6	3	[5]
13	(Venezuela) Ignacio Parisca	1	6	[10]

Qualifying competition
2	(Australia) Pavle Marinkov	6	6
13	(Venezuela) Ignacio Parisca	0	2

==== Third qualifier ====
First round
3	(China) Zhang Tianhui	7^{7}	6
(Thailand) Thanaphat Boosarawongse	6^{2}	3
WC	(United States) Nikita Filin	6	4	[4]
9	(Sweden) Albert Saar	4	6	[10]

Qualifying competition
3	(China) Zhang Tianhui	7	6
9	(Sweden) Albert Saar	5	2

==== Fourth qualifier ====
First round
4	(India) Aryan Shah	6	6
WC	(United States) Stiles Brockett	4	4
(Argentina) Máximo Zeitune	6^{5}	5
14	(Estonia) Markus Mölder	7^{7}	7

Qualifying competition
4	(India) Aryan Shah	6	0	[10]
14	(Estonia) Markus Mölder	4	6	[5]

==== Fifth qualifier ====
First round
5	(Ukraine) Volodymyr Iakubenko	6	6
WC	(United States) Jagger Leach	3	4
(Japan) Reiya Hattori	7^{7}	3	[6]
11	(Turkey) Atakan Karahan	6^{1}	6	[10]

Qualifying competition
5	(Ukraine) Volodymyr Iakubenko	4	0
11	(Turkey) Atakan Karahan	6	6

==== Sixth qualifier ====
First round
6	(United Kingdom) Charlie Robertson	3	2
(South Korea) Park Seung-min	6	6
(United States) Andrew Delgado	3	7^{7}	[10]
15	(Morocco) Ilyas Milad Fahim	6	6^{3}	[7]

Qualifying competition
(South Korea) Park Seung-min	0	6	[10]
(United States) Andrew Delgado	6	0	[7]

==== Seventh qualifier ====
First round
7	(Italy) Fabio De Michele	6	6
WC	(Japan) Shunya Takekata	0	2
WC	(United States) Calvin Baierl	6	6
10	(Brazil) Gustavo Ribeiro de Almeida	3	2

Qualifying competition
7	(Italy) Fabio De Michele	6	1	[10]
WC	(United States) Calvin Baierl	3	6	[4]

==== Eighth qualifier ====
First round
8	(South Korea) Roh Ho-young	6	2	[10]
(Argentina) Segundo Goity Zapico	4	6	[0]
(Brazil) Nicolas Oliveira	6	4	[10]
12	(India) Manas Dhamne	3	6	[6]

Qualifying competition
8	(South Korea) Roh Ho-young	3	7^{7}	[10]
(Brazil) Nicolas Oliveira	6	6^{5}	[3]
