= Maylee Phelps =

American wheelchair tennis player

- Residence: Portland, Oregon, United States
- Born: 4 December 2006 (age 19) China
- Plays: Right-handed (one-handed backhand)

Singles
- Career titles: 13
- Highest ranking: No. 30 (8 April 2024)
- Current ranking: No. 36 (27 January 2025)

Other tournaments
- Paralympic Games: 2R (2024)

Doubles
- Career titles: 9
- Highest ranking: No. 36 (12 June 2023)
- Current ranking: No. 59 (27 January 2025)

Other doubles tournaments
- Paralympic Games: 1R (2024)
Medal record
Parapan American Games
Gold medal – first place	2023 Santiago	Women's doubles

Maylee Phelps (born 4 December 2006) is an American wheelchair tennis player of Chinese descent. She was a junior World number one in January 2023, she has won 2023 US Open and 2024 French Open wheelchair girls' doubles with Ksénia Chasteau. She competed at the 2024 Summer Paralympics where she lost in the second round in the singles' competition, she is a Parapan American Games champion in the women's doubles with Dana Mathewson.

Phelps was born in China, she was adopted when she was two years old. She was born with spina bifida.
