= 2023 US Open – Boys' doubles =

Boys' doubles
- 2023 US Open

Final
- Champions: (Sweden) Max Dahlin (Estonia) Oliver Ojakäär
- Runners-up: (Italy) Federico Bondioli (Austria) Joel Schwärzler
- Score: 3–6, 6–3, [11–9]

Events
Singles	men	women		boys	girls
Doubles	men	women	mixed	boys	girls
WC Singles	men	women	quad	boys	girls
WC Doubles	men	women	quad	boys	girls
- US Open

Max Dahlin and Oliver Ojakäär won the boys' singles title at the 2023 US Open, defeating Federico Bondioli and Joel Schwärzler in the final, 3–6, 6–3, [11–9].

Ozan Baris and Nishesh Basavareddy were the reigning champions, but Baris was no longer eligible to participate in junior events and Basavareddy chose not to compete in doubles this year.

== Seeds ==
1. Yaroslav Demin / (Mexico) Rodrigo Pacheco Méndez (semifinals)
2. (Brazil) João Fonseca / (Bulgaria) Iliyan Radulov (quarterfinals)
3. (Poland) Tomasz Berkieta / (United Kingdom) Henry Searle (second round)
4. (United States) Kyle Kang / (United States) Cooper Williams (quarterfinals)
5. (Serbia) Branko Djuric / (France) Arthur Géa (second round)
6. (Italy) Federico Bondioli / (Austria) Joel Schwärzler (final)
7. (Italy) Federico Cinà / (Japan) Rei Sakamoto (second round)
8. (United States) Darwin Blanch / (United States) Roy Horovitz (first round)

== Draw ==
Key

- Q = Qualifier
- WC = Wild card
- LL = Lucky loser
- Alt = Alternate
- ITF = ITF entry
- PR = Protected ranking
- SR = Special ranking
- SE = Special exempt
- JE = Junior exempt
- JR = Junior Accelerator Programme entrant
- CO = College Accelerator Programme entrant
- NG = Next Gen Accelerator Program entrant
- w/o = Walkover
- r = Retired
- d = Defaulted

=== Finals ===
Semifinals
1	Yaroslav Demin (Mexico) Rodrigo Pacheco Méndez	7^{7}	3	[6]
6	(Italy) Federico Bondioli (Austria) Joel Schwärzler	6^{4}	6	[10]
(Australia) Hayden Jones (United States) Alexander Razeghi	5	6^{6}
(Sweden) Max Dahlin (Estonia) Oliver Ojakäär	7	7^{8}

Final
6	(Italy) Federico Bondioli (Austria) Joel Schwärzler	6	3	[9]
(Sweden) Max Dahlin (Estonia) Oliver Ojakäär	3	6	[11]

=== Top half ===
First round
1	Yaroslav Demin (Mexico) Rodrigo Pacheco Méndez	7^{7}	6
(Netherlands) Abel Forger (Netherlands) Mees Röttgering	6^{2}	4
WC	(United States) Jagger Leach (United States) Carel Aubriel Ngounoue	3	2
(Turkey) Atakan Karahan (South Korea) Roh Ho-young	6	6
WC	(United States) Andrew Delgado (United States) Matthew Forbes	6^{2}	2
(South Korea) Park Seung-min (India) Aryan Shah	7^{7}	6
(Slovenia) Matic Križnik (Czech Republic) Maxim Mrva	5	6	[8]
7	(Italy) Federico Cinà (Japan) Rei Sakamoto	7	4	[10]
4	(United States) Kyle Kang (United States) Cooper Williams	7	6
(Australia) Charlie Camus (Switzerland) Patrick Schön	5	3
(Sweden) Kevin Edengren (Ukraine) Volodymyr Iakubenko	6	3	[7]
(Japan) Hayato Matsuoka; Danil Panarin	3	6	[10]
(United States) Kaylan Bigun (United States) Meecah Bigun	6	3	[8]
(Italy) Fabio De Michele (Italy) Gabriele Vulpitta	4	6	[10]
(Norway) Nicolai Budkov Kjær (Germany) Lasse Pörtner	4	7^{7}	[3]
6	(Italy) Federico Bondioli (Austria) Joel Schwärzler	6	6^{5}	[10]

Second round
1	Y Demin (Mexico) R Pacheco Méndez	6	6
(Turkey) A Karahan (South Korea) H-y Roh	4	4
(South Korea) S-m Park (India) A Shah	6	7^{7}
7	(Italy) F Cinà (Japan) R Sakamoto	3	6^{2}
4	(United States) K Kang (United States) C Williams	6	6
(Japan) H Matsuoka; D Panarin	4	0
(Italy) F De Michele (Italy) G Vulpitta	3	4
6	(Italy) F Bondioli (Austria) J Schwärzler	6	6

Quarterfinals
1	Y Demin (Mexico) R Pacheco Méndez	6	3	[10]
(South Korea) S-m Park (India) A Shah	2	6	[6]
4	(United States) K Kang (United States) C Williams	3	6^{5}
6	(Italy) F Bondioli (Austria) J Schwärzler	6	7^{7}

Semifinals
1	Y Demin (Mexico) R Pacheco Méndez	7^{7}	3	[6]
6	(Italy) F Bondioli (Austria) J Schwärzler	6^{4}	6	[10]

=== Bottom half ===
First round
5	(Serbia) Branko Djuric (France) Arthur Géa	6	4	[10]
(Sweden) Sebastian Eriksson (South Korea) Kim Jang-jun	3	6	[7]
(United States) Maxwell Exsted (United States) Cooper Woestendick	6	6
(Italy) Carlo Alberto Caniato (Argentina) Fernando Cavallo	3	4
(Australia) Hayden Jones (United States) Alexander Razeghi	6	6
WC	(United States) Nicholas Patrick (United States) Maxim Kalinin	1	2
(Australia) Pavle Marinkov (India) Yuvan Nandal	6^{2}	3
3	(Poland) Tomasz Berkieta (United Kingdom) Henry Searle	7^{7}	6
8	(United States) Darwin Blanch (United States) Roy Horovitz	3	4
(Sweden) Max Dahlin (Estonia) Oliver Ojakäär	6	6
(Czech Republic) Jakub Filip (Czech Republic) Jan Hrazdil	7^{7}	6^{3}	[6]
(United Kingdom) Oliver Bonding (Spain) Alejandro Melero Kretzer	6^{5}	7^{7}	[10]
(Estonia) Markus Mölder (Sweden) Albert Saar	4	3
(China) Zhang Tianhui (China) Zhou Yi	6	6
(United States) Alexander Frusina (United States) Adhithya Ganesan	6^{2}	6	[5]
2	(Brazil) João Fonseca (Bulgaria) Iliyan Radulov	7^{7}	4	[10]

Second round
5	(Serbia) B Djuric (France) A Géa	3	5
(United States) M Exsted (United States) C Woestendick	6	7
(Australia) H Jones (United States) A Razeghi	4	6	[10]
3	(Poland) T Berkieta (United Kingdom) H Searle	6	3	[8]
(Sweden) M Dahlin (Estonia) O Ojakäär	6	7
(United Kingdom) O Bonding (Spain) A Melero Kretzer	2	5
(China) T Zhang (China) Y Zhou	1	6^{6}
2	(Brazil) J Fonseca (Bulgaria) I Radulov	6	7^{8}

Quarterfinals
(United States) M Exsted (United States) C Woestendick	7^{7}	3	[9]
(Australia) H Jones (United States) A Razeghi	6^{1}	6	[11]
(Sweden) M Dahlin (Estonia) O Ojakäär	6	4	[10]
2	(Brazil) J Fonseca (Bulgaria) I Radulov	4	6	[8]

Semifinals
(Australia) H Jones (United States) A Razeghi	5	6^{6}
(Sweden) M Dahlin (Estonia) O Ojakäär	7	7^{8}
