= 2023 US Open – Wheelchair men's singles =

Wheelchair men's singles
- 2023 US Open

Final
- Champion: (United Kingdom) Alfie Hewett
- Runner-up: (United Kingdom) Gordon Reid
- Score: 6–4, 6–3

Events
Singles	men	women		boys	girls
Doubles	men	women	mixed	boys	girls
WC Singles	men	women	quad
WC Doubles	men	women	quad
← 2022 ·	US Open	· 2025 →

Defending champion Alfie Hewett defeated Gordon Reid in the final, 6–4, 6–3 to win the men's singles wheelchair tennis title at the 2023 US Open. It was his fourth US Open singles title and eighth major singles title overall.

== Seeds ==
1. (Japan) Tokito Oda (first round)
2. (United Kingdom) Alfie Hewett (champion)
3. (Argentina) Gustavo Fernández (semifinals)
4. (Spain) Martín de la Puente (quarterfinals)

== Draw ==
=== Key ===
- Q = Qualifier
- WC = Wild card
- LL = Lucky loser
- Alt = Alternate
- ITF = ITF entry
- PR = Protected ranking
- SR = Special ranking
- SE = Special exempt
- JE = Junior exempt
- JR = Junior Accelerator Programme entrant
- CO = College Accelerator Programme entrant
- NG = Next Gen Accelerator Program entrant
- w/o = Walkover
- r = Retired
- d = Defaulted

=== Finals ===
First round
1	(Japan) Tokito Oda	1	1
(France) Stéphane Houdet	6	6
WC	(United States) Casey Ratzlaff	7	2	7
(Netherlands) Maikel Scheffers	5	6	5
4	(Spain) Martín de la Puente	6	6^{5}	6
(Japan) Takashi Sanada	0	7^{7}	4
(United Kingdom) Gordon Reid	6	6
(Chile) Alexander Cataldo	2	2
(Netherlands) Ruben Spaargaren	6^{6}	6	6
(Japan) Daisuke Arai	7^{8}	4	4
(Belgium) Joachim Gérard	7^{7}	2	4
3	(Argentina) Gustavo Fernández	6^{5}	6	6
(Japan) Takuya Miki	6	6
WC	(United States) Conner Stroud	2	3
(Netherlands) Tom Egberink	1	2
2	(United Kingdom) Alfie Hewett	6	6

Quarterfinals
(France) S Houdet	6	6
WC	(United States) C Ratzlaff	3	3
4	(Spain) M de la Puente	6	5	5
(United Kingdom) G Reid	1	7	7
(Netherlands) R Spaargaren	6	2	1
3	(Argentina) G Fernández	4	6	6
(Japan) T Miki	1	3
2	(United Kingdom) A Hewett	6	6

Semifinals
(France) S Houdet	0	3
(United Kingdom) G Reid	6	6
3	(Argentina) G Fernández	0	1
2	(United Kingdom) A Hewett	6	6

Final
(United Kingdom) G Reid	4	3
2	(United Kingdom) A Hewett	6	6
