= 2023 US Open – Wheelchair women's doubles =

Wheelchair women's doubles
- 2023 US Open

Final
- Champions: (Japan) Yui Kamiji (South Africa) Kgothatso Montjane
- Runners-up: (Netherlands) Diede de Groot (Netherlands) Jiske Griffioen
- Score: Walkover

Events
Singles	men	women		boys	girls
Doubles	men	women	mixed	boys	girls
WC Singles	men	women	quad
WC Doubles	men	women	quad
← 2022 ·	US Open	· 2025 →

Yui Kamiji and Kgothatso Montjane won the women's doubles wheelchair tennis title at the 2023 US Open after the two-time defending champion Diede de Groot and her partner Jiske Griffioen withdrew from the final.

De Groot and Aniek van Koot were the two-time defending champions, but chose not to compete together. Van Koot partnered Momoko Ohtani, but lost in the quarterfinals to Dana Mathewson and Manami Tanaka.

== Seeds ==
1. (Netherlands) Diede de Groot / (Netherlands) Jiske Griffioen (final, withdrew)
2. (Japan) Yui Kamiji / (South Africa) Kgothatso Montjane (champions)

== Draw ==
=== Key ===
- Q = Qualifier
- WC = Wild card
- LL = Lucky loser
- Alt = Alternate
- ITF = ITF entry
- PR = Protected ranking
- SR = Special ranking
- SE = Special exempt
- JE = Junior exempt
- JR = Junior Accelerator Programme entrant
- CO = College Accelerator Programme entrant
- NG = Next Gen Accelerator Program entrant
- w/o = Walkover
- r = Retired
- d = Defaulted

=== Finals ===
Quarterfinals
1	(Netherlands) Diede de Groot (Netherlands) Jiske Griffioen	6	6
(Colombia) Angélica Bernal (Netherlands) Lizzy de Greef	3	1
(Argentina) María Florencia Moreno (China) Zhu Zhenzhen	6	6
(Japan) Shiori Funamizu (Germany) Katharina Kruger	3	2
(United States) Dana Mathewson (Japan) Manami Tanaka	6	3	[10]
(Japan) Momoko Ohtani (Netherlands) Aniek van Koot	3	6	[7]
(France) Pauline Déroulède (United Kingdom) Lucy Shuker	1	3
2	(Japan) Yui Kamiji (South Africa) Kgothatso Montjane	6	6

Semifinals
1	(Netherlands) Diede de Groot (Netherlands) Jiske Griffioen	6	6
(Argentina) María Florencia Moreno (China) Zhu Zhenzhen	0	1
(United States) Dana Mathewson (Japan) Manami Tanaka	1	4
2	(Japan) Yui Kamiji (South Africa) Kgothatso Montjane	6	6

Final
1	(Netherlands) Diede de Groot (Netherlands) Jiske Griffioen
2	(Japan) Yui Kamiji (South Africa) Kgothatso Montjane	w/o
