= 2023 US Open – Wheelchair men's doubles =

Wheelchair men's doubles
- 2023 US Open

Final
- Champions: (France) Stéphane Houdet (Japan) Takashi Sanada
- Runners-up: (Japan) Takuya Miki (Japan) Tokito Oda
- Score: 6–4, 6–4

Events
Singles	men	women		boys	girls
Doubles	men	women	mixed	boys	girls
WC Singles	men	women	quad
WC Doubles	men	women	quad
← 2022 ·	US Open	· 2025 →

Stéphane Houdet and Takashi Sanada defeated Takuya Miki and Tokito Oda in the final, 6–4, 6–4 to win the men's doubles wheelchair tennis title at the 2023 US Open.

Martín de la Puente and Nicolas Peifer were the reigning champions, but Peifer did not participate this year. De la Puente partnered Gustavo Fernández, but lost in the quarterfinals to Miki and Oda.

== Seeds ==
1. (United Kingdom) Alfie Hewett / (United Kingdom) Gordon Reid (semifinals)
2. (Spain) Martín de la Puente / (Argentina) Gustavo Fernández (quarterfinals)

== Draw ==
=== Key ===
- Q = Qualifier
- WC = Wild card
- LL = Lucky loser
- Alt = Alternate
- ITF = ITF entry
- PR = Protected ranking
- SR = Special ranking
- SE = Special exempt
- JE = Junior exempt
- JR = Junior Accelerator Programme entrant
- CO = College Accelerator Programme entrant
- NG = Next Gen Accelerator Program entrant
- w/o = Walkover
- r = Retired
- d = Defaulted

=== Finals ===
Quarterfinals
1	(United Kingdom) Alfie Hewett (United Kingdom) Gordon Reid	7	6
(Belgium) Joachim Gérard (Netherlands) Maikel Scheffers	5	3
(Netherlands) Tom Egberink (Netherlands) Ruben Spaargaren	1	7^{7}	[7]
(France) Stéphane Houdet (Japan) Takashi Sanada	6	6^{1}	[10]
(Chile) Alexander Cataldo (United States) Casey Ratzlaff	6	7
(Japan) Daisuke Arai (United States) Conner Stroud	2	5
(Japan) Takuya Miki (Japan) Tokito Oda	7^{7}	6
2	(Spain) Martín de la Puente (Argentina) Gustavo Fernández	6^{3}	4

Semifinals
1	(United Kingdom) Alfie Hewett (United Kingdom) Gordon Reid	5	6^{8}
(France) Stéphane Houdet (Japan) Takashi Sanada	7	7^{10}
(Chile) Alexander Cataldo (United States) Casey Ratzlaff	2	0
(Japan) Takuya Miki (Japan) Tokito Oda	6	6

Final
(France) Stéphane Houdet (Japan) Takashi Sanada	6	6
(Japan) Takuya Miki (Japan) Tokito Oda	4	4
