= 2023 US Open – Wheelchair quad singles =

Wheelchair quad singles
- 2023 US Open

Final
- Champion: (Netherlands) Sam Schröder
- Runner-up: (Netherlands) Niels Vink
- Score: 6–3, 7–5

Events
Singles	men	women		boys	girls
Doubles	men	women	mixed	boys	girls
WC Singles	men	women	quad
WC Doubles	men	women	quad
← 2022 ·	US Open	· 2025 →

Sam Schröder defeated defending champion Niels Vink in a rematch of the previous year's final, 6–3, 7–5 to win the quad singles wheelchair tennis title at the 2023 US Open. It was his fifth major singles title.

The draw was expanded from eight to 16 players this year.

== Seeds ==
1. (Netherlands) Niels Vink (final)
2. (Netherlands) Sam Schröder (champion)
3. (South Africa) Donald Ramphadi (quarterfinals)
4. (United States) David Wagner (semifinals)

== Draw ==
=== Key ===
- Q = Qualifier
- WC = Wild card
- LL = Lucky loser
- Alt = Alternate
- ITF = ITF entry
- PR = Protected ranking
- SR = Special ranking
- SE = Special exempt
- JE = Junior exempt
- JR = Junior Accelerator Programme entrant
- CO = College Accelerator Programme entrant
- NG = Next Gen Accelerator Program entrant
- w/o = Walkover
- r = Retired
- d = Defaulted

=== Finals ===
First round
1	(Netherlands) Niels Vink	6	6
(Chile) Francisco Cayulef	2	2
(Chile) Diego Pérez	3	2
(Japan) Koji Sugeno	6	6
3	(South Africa) Donald Ramphadi	6	6
WC	(United States) Andrew Bogdanov	2	2
(United Kingdom) Andy Lapthorne	6	2	6
(Canada) Robert Shaw	3	6	3
(Australia) Heath Davidson	6	6
WC	(Turkey) Uğur Altınel	0	1
(Brazil) Ymanitu Silva	1	1
4	(United States) David Wagner	6	6
(Slovakia) Tomáš Masaryk	1	1
(Israel) Guy Sasson	6	6
(Turkey) Ahmet Kaplan	0	0
2	(Netherlands) Sam Schröder	6	6

Quarterfinals
1	(Netherlands) N Vink	6	6
(Japan) K Sugeno	1	2
3	(South Africa) D Ramphadi	2	0
(United Kingdom) A Lapthorne	6	6
(Australia) H Davidson	2	6	4
4	(United States) D Wagner	6	3	6
(Israel) G Sasson	5	2
2	(Netherlands) S Schröder	7	6

Semifinals
1	(Netherlands) N Vink	6	6
(United Kingdom) A Lapthorne	2	1
4	(United States) D Wagner	2	3
2	(Netherlands) S Schröder	6	6

Final
1	(Netherlands) N Vink	3	5
2	(Netherlands) S Schröder	6	7
