= 2023 US Open – Wheelchair women's singles =

Wheelchair women's singles
- 2023 US Open

Final
- Champion: (Netherlands) Diede de Groot
- Runner-up: (Japan) Yui Kamiji
- Score: 6–2, 6–2

Details
- Draw: 16
- Seeds: 4

Events
Singles	men	women		boys	girls
Doubles	men	women	mixed	boys	girls
WC Singles	men	women	quad
WC Doubles	men	women	quad
← 2022 ·	US Open	· 2025 →

Five-time defending champion Diede de Groot defeated Yui Kamiji in the final, 6–2, 6–2 to win the women's singles wheelchair tennis title at the 2023 US Open. With the win, de Groot completed the Grand Slam for a third consecutive year, and won a 12th consecutive major singles title (an all-time record in any tennis discipline). This marked the seventh consecutive year where de Groot and Kamiji contested the final.

== Seeds ==
1. (Netherlands) Diede de Groot (champion)
2. (Japan) Yui Kamiji (final)
3. (Netherlands) Jiske Griffioen (semifinals, retired)
4. (Japan) Momoko Ohtani (semifinals)

== Draw ==
=== Key ===
- Q = Qualifier
- WC = Wild card
- LL = Lucky loser
- Alt = Alternate
- ITF = ITF entry
- PR = Protected ranking
- SR = Special ranking
- SE = Special exempt
- JE = Junior exempt
- JR = Junior Accelerator Programme entrant
- CO = College Accelerator Programme entrant
- NG = Next Gen Accelerator Program entrant
- w/o = Walkover
- r = Retired
- d = Defaulted

=== Finals ===
First round
1	(Netherlands) Diede de Groot	6	6
WC	(France) Pauline Déroulède	2	0
(United Kingdom) Lucy Shuker	4	6	6
(Japan) Manami Tanaka	6	3	4
4	(Japan) Momoko Ohtani	6	6
(China) Zhu Zhenzhen	0	2
(South Africa) Kgothatso Montjane	6	6
WC	(Argentina) María Florencia Moreno	2	1
(Netherlands) Aniek van Koot	6	6
(Netherlands) Lizzy de Greef	0	3
(Japan) Shiori Funamizu	1	1
3	(Netherlands) Jiske Griffioen	6	6
(Colombia) Angélica Bernal	6	6
(Germany) Katharina Krüger	4	1
(United States) Dana Mathewson	5	1
2	(Japan) Yui Kamiji	7	6

Quarterfinals
1	(Netherlands) D de Groot	6	6
(United Kingdom) L Shuker	2	0
4	(Japan) M Ohtani	6	6
(South Africa) K Montjane	2	4
(Netherlands) A van Koot	4	3
3	(Netherlands) J Griffioen	6	6
(Colombia) A Bernal	3	2
2	(Japan) Y Kamiji	6	6

Semifinals
1	(Netherlands) D de Groot	6	6
4	(Japan) M Ohtani	3	1
3	(Netherlands) J Griffioen	0	0^{r}
2	(Japan) Y Kamiji	6	0

Final
1	(Netherlands) D de Groot	6	6
2	(Japan) Y Kamiji	2	2
