= 2023 US Open – Wheelchair quad doubles =

Wheelchair quad doubles
- 2023 US Open

Final
- Champions: (Netherlands) Sam Schröder (Netherlands) Niels Vink
- Runners-up: (United Kingdom) Andy Lapthorne (South Africa) Donald Ramphadi
- Score: 6–1, 6–2

Events
Singles	men	women		boys	girls
Doubles	men	women	mixed	boys	girls
WC Singles	men	women	quad
WC Doubles	men	women	quad
← 2022 ·	US Open	· 2025 →

Two-time defending champions Sam Schröder and Niels Vink defeated Andy Lapthorne and Donald Ramphadi in the final, 6–1, 6–2 to win the quad doubles wheelchair tennis title at the 2023 US Open.

== Seeds ==
1. (Netherlands) Sam Schröder / (Netherlands) Niels Vink (champions)
2. (Australia) Heath Davidson / (Canada) Robert Shaw (quarterfinals)

== Draw ==
=== Key ===
- Q = Qualifier
- WC = Wild card
- LL = Lucky loser
- Alt = Alternate
- ITF = ITF entry
- PR = Protected ranking
- SR = Special ranking
- SE = Special exempt
- JE = Junior exempt
- JR = Junior Accelerator Programme entrant
- CO = College Accelerator Programme entrant
- NG = Next Gen Accelerator Program entrant
- w/o = Walkover
- r = Retired
- d = Defaulted

=== Finals ===
Quarterfinals
1	(Netherlands) Sam Schröder (Netherlands) Niels Vink	3	6	[10]
(Israel) Guy Sasson (Japan) Koji Sugeno	6	1	[6]
(Chile) Francisco Cayulef (Chile) Diego Pérez	7	6
(United States) Andrew Bogdanov (United States) David Wagner	5	1
(Turkey) Uğur Altınel (Turkey) Ahmet Kaplan	0	2
(Slovakia) Tomáš Masaryk (Brazil) Ymanitu Silva	6	6
(United Kingdom) Andy Lapthorne (South Africa) Donald Ramphadi	7^{7}	6
2	(Australia) Heath Davidson (Canada) Robert Shaw	6^{4}	4

Semifinals
1	(Netherlands) Sam Schröder (Netherlands) Niels Vink	6	6
(Chile) Francisco Cayulef (Chile) Diego Pérez	1	2
(Slovakia) Tomáš Masaryk (Brazil) Ymanitu Silva	2	2^{r}
(United Kingdom) Andy Lapthorne (South Africa) Donald Ramphadi	6	3

Final
1	(Netherlands) Sam Schröder (Netherlands) Niels Vink	6	6
(United Kingdom) Andy Lapthorne (South Africa) Donald Ramphadi	1	2
