= 2023 US Open – Mixed doubles =

Mixed doubles
- 2023 US Open

Final
- Champions: (Kazakhstan) Anna Danilina (Finland) Harri Heliövaara
- Runners-up: (United States) Jessica Pegula (United States) Austin Krajicek
- Score: 6–3, 6–4

Details
- Draw: 32
- Seeds: 8

Events
Singles	men	women		boys	girls
Doubles	men	women	mixed	boys	girls
WC Singles	men	women	quad
WC Doubles	men	women	quad
- US Open

Anna Danilina and Harri Heliövaara defeated Jessica Pegula and Austin Krajicek in the final, 6–3, 6–4 to win the mixed doubles tennis title at the 2023 US Open. Danilina became the first Kazakhstani Major mixed doubles champion, and Heliövaara became the first Finnish US Open mixed doubles champion.

Storm Hunter and John Peers were the defending champions, but lost in the first round to Barbora Strýcová and Santiago González. Strýcová, a former world No. 1 in doubles, played her final professional match in the quarterfinals.

Ivan Dodig was vying to complete the career Grand Slam, but lost in the first round.

== Seeds ==
1. (United States) Jessica Pegula / (United States) Austin Krajicek (final)
2. (United States) Desirae Krawczyk / (United Kingdom) Neal Skupski (withdrew)
3. (Chinese Taipei) Hsieh Su-wei / (El Salvador) Marcelo Arévalo (second round)
4. (Brazil) Luisa Stefani / (United Kingdom) Joe Salisbury (first round)
5. (Australia) Ellen Perez / (Netherlands) Jean-Julien Rojer (quarterfinals)
6. (United States) Nicole Melichar-Martinez / (Australia) Matthew Ebden (first round)
7. (Netherlands) Demi Schuurs / (Monaco) Hugo Nys (quarterfinals)
8. (China) Yang Zhaoxuan / (Germany) Kevin Krawietz (second round)

== Draw ==
Key

- Q = Qualifier
- WC = Wild card
- LL = Lucky loser
- Alt = Alternate
- ITF = ITF entry
- PR = Protected ranking
- SR = Special ranking
- SE = Special exempt
- JE = Junior exempt
- JR = Junior Accelerator Programme entrant
- CO = College Accelerator Programme entrant
- NG = Next Gen Accelerator Program entrant
- w/o = Walkover
- r = Retired
- d = Defaulted

=== Finals ===
Semifinals
1	(United States) Jessica Pegula (United States) Austin Krajicek	6^{5}	6	[10]
(United States) Taylor Townsend (United States) Ben Shelton	7^{7}	1	[3]
(Japan) Ena Shibahara (Croatia) Mate Pavić	6^{2}	4
(Kazakhstan) Anna Danilina (Finland) Harri Heliövaara	7^{7}	6

Final
1	(United States) Jessica Pegula (United States) Austin Krajicek	3	4
(Kazakhstan) Anna Danilina (Finland) Harri Heliövaara	6	6

=== Top half ===
First round
1	(United States) J Pegula (United States) A Krajicek	2	6	[10]
(Germany) L Siegemund (Belgium) S Gillé	6	3	[4]
(Czech Republic) K Siniaková (Brazil) M Melo	6^{4}	6	[4]
WC	(United States) B Mattek-Sands (United Kingdom) J Murray	7^{7}	0	[10]
WC	(United States) M Mateas (United States) M McDonald	3	2
WC	(United States) R Montgomery (United States) A Michelsen	6	6
(Chinese Taipei) H-c Chan (United Kingdom) L Glasspool	6^{2}	6^{7}
5	(Australia) E Perez (Netherlands) J-J Rojer	7^{7}	7^{9}
4	(Brazil) L Stefani (United Kingdom) J Salisbury	4	6^{5}
(United States) T Townsend (United States) B Shelton	6	7^{7}
(Indonesia) A Sutjiadi (India) R Bopanna	7	6
V Zvonareva (Germany) A Mies	5	2
(Chinese Taipei) L Chan (Croatia) I Dodig	6^{6}	6^{4}
(Mexico) G Olmos (Germany) T Pütz	7^{8}	7^{7}
(Canada) G Dabrowski (United States) N Lammons	4	4
7	(Netherlands) D Schuurs (Monaco) H Nys	6	6

Second round
1	(United States) J Pegula (United States) A Krajicek	7^{7}	7
WC	(United States) B Mattek-Sands (United Kingdom) J Murray	6^{5}	5
WC	(United States) R Montgomery (United States) A Michelsen	4	4
5	(Australia) E Perez (Netherlands) J-J Rojer	6	6
(United States) T Townsend (United States) B Shelton	6	7
(Indonesia) A Sutjiadi (India) R Bopanna	2	5
(Mexico) G Olmos (Germany) T Pütz	3	1
7	(Netherlands) D Schuurs (Monaco) H Nys	6	6

Quarterfinals
1	(United States) J Pegula (United States) A Krajicek	6	3	[10]
5	(Australia) E Perez (Netherlands) J-J Rojer	4	6	[8]
(United States) T Townsend (United States) B Shelton	6	6
7	(Netherlands) D Schuurs (Monaco) H Nys	4	2

Semifinals
1	(United States) J Pegula (United States) A Krajicek	6^{5}	6	[10]
(United States) T Townsend (United States) B Shelton	7^{7}	1	[3]

=== Bottom half ===
First round
8	(China) Z Yang (Germany) K Krawietz	2	6	[10]
(Ukraine) L Kichenok (Poland) J Zieliński	6	1	[5]
(Australia) S Hunter (Australia) J Peers	6	6^{5}	[9]
(Czech Republic) B Strýcová (Mexico) S González	2	7^{7}	[11]
Alt	(Ukraine) N Kichenok (Argentina) M González	7^{7}	3	[9]
(Japan) E Shibahara (Croatia) M Pavić	6^{3}	6	[11]
WC	(United States) D Collins (United States) R Harrison	2	4
3	(Chinese Taipei) S-w Hsieh (El Salvador) M Arévalo	6	6
6	(United States) N Melichar-Martinez (Australia) M Ebden	3	7	[7]
(Kazakhstan) A Danilina (Finland) H Heliövaara	6	5	[10]
WC	(United States) C Gauff (United States) J Sock	2	6^{2}
WC	(United States) A Parks (United States) D Kudla	6	7^{7}
WC	(United States) A Krueger (United States) E Quinn	7^{7}	6
WC	(United States) A Muhammad (United States) J Withrow	6^{4}	4
(China) Y Xu (Belgium) J Vliegen	7^{7}	4	[10]
Alt	(Chile) A Guarachi (Argentina) A Molteni	6^{2}	6	[6]

Second round
8	(China) Z Yang (Germany) K Krawietz	2	2
(Czech Republic) B Strýcová (Mexico) S González	6	6
(Japan) E Shibahara (Croatia) M Pavić	6	6
3	(Chinese Taipei) S-w Hsieh (El Salvador) M Arévalo	1	4
(Kazakhstan) A Danilina (Finland) H Heliövaara	6	6
WC	(United States) A Parks (United States) D Kudla	3	3
WC	(United States) A Krueger (United States) E Quinn	2	6^{2}
(China) Y Xu (Belgium) J Vliegen	6	7^{7}

Quarterfinals
(Czech Republic) B Strýcová (Mexico) S González	4	6^{6}
(Japan) E Shibahara (Croatia) M Pavić	6	7^{8}
(Kazakhstan) A Danilina (Finland) H Heliövaara	7	7^{7}
(China) Y Xu (Belgium) J Vliegen	5	6^{2}

Semifinals
(Japan) E Shibahara (Croatia) M Pavić	6^{2}	4
(Kazakhstan) A Danilina (Finland) H Heliövaara	7^{7}	6

== Other entry information ==
=== Wild cards ===
- (United States) Danielle Collins / (United States) Ryan Harrison
- (United States) Coco Gauff / (United States) Jack Sock
- (United States) Ashlyn Krueger / (United States) Ethan Quinn
- (United States) Maria Mateas / (United States) Mackenzie McDonald
- (United States) Bethanie Mattek-Sands / (United Kingdom) Jamie Murray
- (United States) Robin Montgomery / (United States) Alex Michelsen
- (United States) Asia Muhammad / (United States) Jackson Withrow
- (United States) Alycia Parks / (United States) Denis Kudla

=== Alternates ===
- (Chile) Alexa Guarachi / (Argentina) Andrés Molteni
- (Ukraine) Nadiia Kichenok / (Argentina) Máximo González

=== Withdrawals ===
- (United States) Desirae Krawczyk / (United Kingdom) Neal Skupski → replaced by (Chile) Alexa Guarachi / (Argentina) Andrés Molteni
- (United States) Peyton Stearns / (United States) Rajeev Ram → replaced by (Ukraine) Nadiia Kichenok / (Argentina) Máximo González
