= 2024 NCAA Division I Women's Tennis Championships =

- Date: May 3–25, 2024
- Edition: 42nd
- Location: First, second, third rounds: Campus sites Remainder: Stillwater, Oklahoma
- Venue: Greenwood Tennis Center; Hosted by: Oklahoma State University

Champions

Women's singles
- Alexa Noel (Miami (FL))

Women's doubles
- Aysegul Mert and Dasha Vidmanova (Georgia)

Women's team
- Texas A&M
- NCAA Division I Women's Tennis Championships

The 2024 NCAA Division I Women's Tennis Championships were the women's tennis tournaments played from May 3 to May 25, 2024, at campus sites and Stillwater, Oklahoma, at the Greenwood Tennis Center. It was the 42nd edition of the NCAA Division I Women's Tennis Championship. Starting with the 2024–25 season, individual championships moved to the fall. For the tournament held in November 2024, see the 2025 Championships page.

== Women's team championship ==
There were 64 teams selected for the women's team championship, 31 of which were automatic qualifiers from each Division I conference. The remaining 33 teams were selected at-large. Teams played two rounds of single-elimination matches in groups of four on May 3-4 or May 4-5 at campus sites; the winners of those regionals advanced to a super-regional round on May 10 or 11, also held at campus sites. The remaining eight teams advanced to the championship rounds in Stillwater, Oklahoma.

=== Automatic qualifiers ===
The following 31 teams were automatic qualifiers, representing their conferences:

Conference	Team
American	SMU
Atlantic 10	Massachusetts
ACC	North Carolina
ASUN	Stetson
Big East	Xavier
Big Sky	Sacramento State
Big South	UNC Asheville
Big Ten	Michigan
Big 12	Oklahoma State
Big West	Cal Poly
CAA	William & Mary
CUSA	FIU
Horizon	Chicago State
Ivy	Princeton
MAAC	Fairfield
MAC	Toledo
MEAC	South Carolina State
Missouri Valley	Murray State
Mountain West	San Diego State
Northeast	LIU
Ohio Valley	SIU Edwardsville
Pac-12	Stanford
Patriot	Navy
SEC	Georgia
Southern	East Tennessee State
Southland	Texas A&M–Corpus Christi
Summit	Denver
Sun Belt	Old Dominion
SWAC	Alabama State
WAC	Grand Canyon
West Coast	Pepperdine

=== National seeds ===
Sixteen teams were selected as national seeds and were guaranteed to host for the first two rounds if they submitted a bid and met the criteria.

1. Oklahoma State (super regionals)
2. Stanford (quarterfinals)
3. Michigan (quarterfinals)
4. North Carolina (super regionals)
5. Virginia (quarterfinals)
6. Pepperdine (semifinals)
7. Georgia (runner-up)
8. UCLA (quarterfinals)
9. Texas (super regionals)
10. California (super regionals)
11. USC (super regionals)
12. Ohio State (second round)
13. Texas A&M (National Champions)
14. Florida (second round)
15. NC State (super regionals)
16. Tennessee (semifinals)

=== Bracket ===
Bold indicates winner. Host institutions for the first two rounds and Super Regionals are marked with an asterisk (*).

**First Round**; May 3-4 or 4-5, 2024; Campus sites
1	**Oklahoma State***	**4**
Fairfield	0
Stillwater, Oklahoma
**SMU**	**4**
Alabama	3
**Duke**	**4**
ETSU	0
Knoxville, Tennessee
Murray State	0
16	**Tennessee***	**4**
9	**Texas***	**4**
Harvard	0
Boston, Massachusetts
Illinois	1
**Georgia Tech**	**4**
**Texas Tech**	**4**
Denver	1
Los Angeles, California
San Diego State	0
8	**UCLA***	**4**
5	**Virginia***	**4**
LIU	0
Charlottesville, Virginia
**Princeton**	**4**
Washington	3
**Vanderbilt**	**4**
Wake Forest	1
Columbus, Ohio
Toledo	0
12	**Ohio State***	**4**
13	**Texas A&M***	**4**
Texas A&M–Corpus Christi	0
College Station, Texas
Arizona	0
**Oklahoma**	**4**
**Wisconsin**	**4**
William & Mary	0
Chapel Hill, North Carolina
Navy	0
4	**North Carolina***	**4**
3	**Michigan***	**4**
Chicago State	0
Ann Arbor, Michigan
Xavier	3
**Notre Dame**	**4**
**Miami (FL)**	**4**
FIU	1
Gainesville, Florida
Stetson	0
14	**Florida***	**4**
11	**USC***	**4**
Cal Poly	0
Los Angeles, California
Grand Canyon	0
**San Diego**	**4**
**Arizona State**	**4**
Northwestern	3
Malibu, California
SIUE	0
6	**Pepperdine***	**4**
7	**Georgia***	**4**
Alabama State	0
Athens, Georgia
UNC Asheville	0
**Florida State**	**4**
**Auburn**	**4**
BYU	0
Berkeley, California
Sacramento State	0
10	**California***	**4**
15	**NC State***	**4**
South Carolina State	0
Raleigh, North Carolina
**Old Dominion**	**4**
South Carolina	3
**LSU**	**4**
Baylor	3
Stanford, California
Massachusetts	0
2	**Stanford***	**4**

**Second Round**; May 3-4 or 4-5, 2024; Campus sites
1	**Oklahoma State**	**4**
SMU	0
Duke	0
16	**Tennessee**	**4**
9	**Texas**	**4**
Georgia Tech	3
Texas Tech	0
8	**UCLA**	**4**
5	**Virginia**	**4**
Princeton	0
**Vanderbilt**	**4**
12	Ohio State	3
13	**Texas A&M**	**4**
Oklahoma	0
Wisconsin	0
4	**North Carolina**	**4**
3	**Michigan**	**4**
Notre Dame	2
**Miami (FL)**	**4**
14	Florida	3
11	**USC**	**4**
San Diego	0
Arizona State	1
6	**Pepperdine**	**4**
7	**Georgia**	**4**
Florida State	1
Auburn	0
10	**California**	4
15	**NC State**	**4**
Old Dominion	0
LSU	0
2	**Stanford**	**4**

**Super Regionals**; May 10 or 11, 2024; Campus sites
1	Oklahoma State*	2
16	**Tennessee**	**4**
9	Texas	1
8	**UCLA***	**4**
5	**Virginia***	**4**
Vanderbilt	1
13	**Texas A&M**	**4**
4	North Carolina*	1
3	**Michigan***	**4**
Miami (FL)	0
11	USC	0
6	**Pepperdine***	4
7	**Georgia***	**4**
10	California	2
15	NC State	0
2	**Stanford***	**4**

**Quarterfinals**; May 17, 2024; Stillwater
16	**Tennessee**	**4**
8	UCLA	3
5	Virginia	1
13	**Texas A&M**	**4**
3	Michigan	1
6	**Pepperdine**	**4**
7	**Georgia**	**4**
2	Stanford	1

**Semifinals**; May 18, 2024; Stillwater
16	Tennessee	1
13	**Texas A&M**	**4**
6	Pepperdine	0
7	**Georgia**	**4**

**Championship**; May 19, 2024; Stillwater
13	**Texas A&M**	**4**
7	Georgia	1

Bracket source:

== Women's singles championship ==
There were 64 singles players selected to the women's singles championship, 12 of which were automatic qualifiers from each Division I conference with an eligible team ranked in the ITA Top 125. The remaining 52 players were selected at-large. The tournament was played following the team championship from May 20 to 25 in Stillwater, Oklahoma.

Miami (FL) redshirt junior Alexa Noel won the women's singles title against Georgia sophomore Anastasiia Lopata 4-6, 7-5, 6-3.

=== Automatic qualifiers ===
The following 12 players were automatic qualifiers, representing their conferences:

Conference	Player	Team
ACC	Amelia Rajecki	NC State
Big Ten	Kari Miller	Michigan
Big 12	Ange Oby Kajuru	Oklahoma State
Big West	Amelia Honer	UC Santa Barbara
CUSA	Oyinlomo Quadre	FIU
Ivy	Esha Velaga	Penn
Mountain West	Andjela Skrobonja	San Diego State
Pac-12	Connie Ma	Stanford
SEC	Mary Stoiana	Texas A&M
Sun Belt	Sofia Johnson	Old Dominion
WAC	Natasha Puehse	Grand Canyon
West Coast	Savannah Broadus	Pepperdine

=== National seeds ===
The following sixteen players were seeded for this tournament:

1. Mary Stoiana (Texas A&M)
2. Amelia Rajecki (NC State)
3. Ange Oby Kajuru (Oklahoma State)
4. Kari Miller (Michigan)
5. Fiona Crawley (North Carolina)
6. Connie Ma (Stanford)
7. Rachel Gailis (Florida)
8. Alexa Noel (Miami (FL)) (National Champion)

Players ranked 9th–16th, listed by last name

- Ayana Akli (South Carolina)
- Carolyn Ansari (Auburn)
- Savannah Broadus (Pepperdine)
- Sofia Cabezas (Tennessee)
- Celia-Belle Mohr (Vanderbilt)
- Irina Cantos Siemers (Ohio State)
- Dasha Vidmanova (Georgia)
- Lisa Zaar (Pepperdine)

=== Draw ===
Bracket:

==== Finals ====
Quarterfinals
1	Mary Stoiana (Texas A&M)	7	6
Amelia Honer (UC Santa Barbara)	5	4
Alexandra Yepifanova (Stanford)	2	3
8	Alexa Noel (Miami (FL))	6	6
Anastasiia Lopata (Georgia)	4	6	7
9-16	Celia-Belle Mohr (Vanderbilt)	6	4	5
9-16	Dasha Vidmanova (Georgia)	3	5
2	Amelia Rajecki (NC State)	6	7

Semifinals
1	Mary Stoiana (Texas A&M)	3	2
8	Alexa Noel (Miami (FL))	6	6
Anastasiia Lopata (Georgia)	6	7
2	Amelia Rajecki (NC State)	4	5

Final
8	Alexa Noel (Miami (FL))	4	7	6
Anastasiia Lopata (Georgia)	6	5	3

==== Section 1 ====
First round
1	Mary Stoiana (Texas A&M)	6	6
Hannah Viller Moeller (California)	2	0
Anna Zyryanova (NC State)	6	6
Kimmi Hance (UCLA)	3	3
9–16	Sofia Cabezas (Tennessee)	1	4
Annabelle Xu (Virginia)	6	6
Victoria Allen (Florida State)	6	2	7^{5}
Anastasiya Komar (Oklahoma State)	4	6	6
7	Rachel Gailis (Florida)	4	1
Julia Garcia Ruiz (Oklahoma)	6	6
Angelica Blake (Stanford)	2	6
Elizabeth Scotty (North Carolina)	6	7^{4}
9–16	Ayana Akli (South Carolina)	6	6
Casie Wooten (Wake Forest)	0	1
Julia Andreach (Notre Dame)	4	0
Amelia Honer (UC Santa Barbara)	6	6

Second round
1	M Stoiana (Texas A&M)	6	6
A Zyryanova (NC State)	4	2
A Xu (Virginia)	6	6
V Allen (Florida State)	3	3
J Garcia Ruiz (Oklahoma)	6	6	6
E Scotty (North Carolina)	7^{4}	2	4
9-16	A Akli (South Carolina)	4	2
A Honer (UC Santa Barbara)	6	6

Third round
1	M Stoiana (Texas A&M)	6	6
A Xu (Virginia)	2	2
J Garcia Ruiz (Oklahoma)	6	5	4
A Honer (UC Santa Barbara)	4	7	6

Quarterfinals
1	M Stoiana (Texas A&M)	7	6
A Honer (UC Santa Barbara)	5	4

==== Section 2 ====
First round
4	Kari Miller (Michigan)	1	2
Alexandra Yepifanova (Stanford)	6	6
Katja Wiersholm (California)	4	6	3
Alexandra Vecic (Georgia)	6	3	6
9-16	Savannah Broadus (Pepperdine)	5	4
Miyuka Kimoto (Syracuse)	7	6
Carson Tanguilig (North Carolina)	4	1
Luciana Perry (Ohio State)	6	6
8	Alexa Noel (Miami (FL))	6	7
Tanya Sasnouskaya (Texas)	2	5
Esha Velaga (Penn)	2	1
Grace Piper (USC)	6	6
9-16	Carolyn Ansari (Auburn)	7^{2}	7^{1}
Florencia Urrutia (Oklahoma)	6	6
Oyinlomo Quadre (FIU)	0	7	5
Anika Yarlagadda (North Carolina)	6	5	7

Second round
A Yepifanova (Stanford)	6	6	6
A Vecic (Georgia)	7^{4}	2	2
M Kimoto (Syracuse)	1	2
L Perry (Ohio State)	6	6
8	A Noel (Miami (FL))	6	3	6
G Piper (USC)	4	6	1
9-16	C Ansari (Auburn)	0	1
A Yarlagadda (North Carolina)	6	6

Third round
A Yepifanova (Stanford)	7^{4}	6
L Perry (Ohio State)	6	1
8	A Noel (Miami (FL))	6	6
A Yarlagadda (North Carolina)	1	2

Quarterfinals
A Yepifanova (Stanford)	2	3
8	A Noel (Miami (FL))	6	6

==== Section 3 ====
First round
Sofia Johnson (Old Dominion)	6	1	6
Carly Briggs (Florida)	4	6	0
Andjela Skrobonja (San Diego State)	7	6
9-16	Lisa Zaar (Pepperdine)	5	1
Valentina Ivanov (California)	3	2
Anastasiia Lopata (Georgia)	6	6
Cristina Tiglea (Texas Tech)	2	0
5	Fiona Crawley (North Carolina)	6	6
Carolina Gomez Alonso (Arkansas)	2	6	1
Gala Mesochoritou (Michigan)	6	1	6
Dana Guzman (Oklahoma)	2^{ret.}
9-16	Celia-Belle Mohr (Vanderbilt)	4
Bianca Jolie Fernandez (UCLA)	6	0	2
Isabella Pfennig (Miami (FL))	0	6	6
Emma Charney (USC)	3	5
3	Ange Oby Kajuru (Oklahoma State)	6	7

Second round
S Johnson (Old Dominion)	6	1	6
A Skrobonja (San Diego State)	4	6	0
A Lopata (Georgia)	6	3	6
5	F Crawley (North Carolina)	4	6	3
G Mesochoritou (Michigan)	0	2
9-16	C-B Mohr (Vanderbilt)	6	6
I Pfennig (Miami (FL))	4	6	2
3	A O Kajuru (Oklahoma State)	6	1	6

Third round
S Johnson (Old Dominion)	3	5
A Lopata (Georgia)	6	7
9-16	C-B Mohr (Vanderbilt)	6	6	7^{3}
3	A O Kajuru (Oklahoma State)	7^{6}	1	6

Quarterfinals
A Lopata (Georgia)	4	6	7
9-16	C-B Mohr (Vanderbilt)	6	4	5

==== Section 4 ====
First round
DJ Bennett (Auburn)	3	1
Janice Tjen (Pepperdine)	6	6
Ellie Schoppe (Florida State)	7	4	3
9-16	Dasha Vidmanova (Georgia)	5	6	6
Mia Kupres (Texas A&M)	6	5	6
Natasha Puehse (Grand Canyon)	2	7	0
Reilly Tran (North Carolina)	6	2
6	Connie Ma (Stanford)	7^{2}	6
Sarah Hamner (South Carolina)	7^{5}	6
Shavit Kimchi (Duke)	6	2
Hibah Shaikh (Virginia)	3	3
9-16	Irina Cantos Siemers (Ohio State)	6	6
Carol Lee (Georgia Tech)	4	6
Malaika Rapolu (Texas)	6	7^{5}
Julia Fliegner (Michigan)	0	2
2	Amelia Rajecki (NC State)	6	6

Second round
J Tjen (Pepperdine)	6	5
9-16	D Vidmanova (Georgia)	7^{1}	7
M Kupres (Texas A&M)	1	3
6	C Ma (Stanford)	6	6
S Hamner (South Carolina)	2	6
9-16	I Cantos Siemers (Ohio State)	6	7^{5}
M Rapolu (Texas)	6	3	4
2	A Rajecki (NC State)	4	6	6

Third round
9-16	D Vidmanova (Georgia)	6	6
6	C Ma (Stanford)	3	4
9-16	I Cantos Siemers (Ohio State)	6	2
2	A Rajecki (NC State)	7^{5}	6

Quarterfinals
9-16	D Vidmanova (Georgia)	3	5
2	A Rajecki (NC State)	6	7

== Women's doubles championship ==
There were 32 doubles teams selected to the women's doubles championship, 10 of whom were automatic qualifiers from each Division I conference with an eligible team ranked in the ITA Top 60. The remaining 22 teams were selected at-large. The tournament was played following the team championship from May 20 to 25 in Stillwater, Oklahoma.

Aysegul Mert and Dasha Vidmanova of Georgia beat Savannah Broadus and Janice Tjen of Pepperdine, to win the women's double title.

=== Automatic qualifiers ===
The following 10 teams were automatic qualifiers, representing their conferences:

Conference	Player	Team
ACC	Reese Brantmeier	North Carolina
ACC	Elizabeth Scotty	North Carolina
American	Taylor Johnson	SMU
American	Lana Mavor	SMU
Big 12	Ange Oby Kajuru	Oklahoma State
Big 12	Anastasiya Komar	Oklahoma State
Big Ten	Jaedan Brown	Michigan
Big Ten	Kari Miller	Michigan
Big West	Amelia Honer	UC Santa Barbara
Big West	Kira Reuter	UC Santa Barbara
Conference USA	Katerina Mandelikova	FIU
Conference USA	Oyinlomo Quadre	FIU
Ivy	Esha Velaga	Penn
Ivy	Eileen Wang	Penn
Pac-12	Fangran Tian	UCLA
Pac-12	Elise Wagle	UCLA
SEC	Mia Kupres	Texas A&M
SEC	Mary Stoiana	Texas A&M
West Coast	Savannah Broadus	Pepperdine
West Coast	Janice Tjen	Pepperdine

=== National seeds ===
The following eight teams were seeded for this tournament:

1. Reese Brantmeier / Elizabeth Scotty (North Carolina)
2. Savannah Broadus / Janice Tjen (Pepperdine)
3. Ange Oby Kajuru / Anastasiya Komar (Oklahoma State)
4. Dana Guzman / Alina Shcherbinina (Oklahoma)

Players ranked 5th–8th, listed by institution

- Jaedan Brown / Kari Miller (Michigan)
- Fiona Crawley / Carson Tanguilig (North Carolina)
- Mia Kupres / Mary Stoiana (Texas A&M)
- Metka Komac / Avelina Sayfetdinova (Texas Tech)

=== Draw ===
Bracket:

==== Finals ====
Semifinals
1	Savannah Broadus (Pepperdine); Janice Tjen (Pepperdine)	6	6
Sofia Cabezas (Tennessee); Elza Tomase (Tennessee)	2	1
Aysegul Mert (Georgia); Dasha Vidmanova (Georgia)	6	6
Celia-Belle Mohr (Vanderbilt); Anessa Lee (Vanderbilt)	4	4

Final
1	Savannah Broadus (Pepperdine); Janice Tjen (Pepperdine)	6	6	9
Aysegul Mert (Georgia); Dasha Vidmanova (Georgia)	7^{4}	2	[11]

==== Top half ====
First round
1	Savannah Broadus (Pepperdine); Janice Tjen (Pepperdine)	3	6	[15]
Mao Mushika (California); Hannah Viller Moeller (California)	6	2	[13]
Ariana Arseneault (Auburn); DJ Bennett (Auburn)	7^{3}	7
Tian Fangran (UCLA); Elise Wagle (UCLA)	6	5
5-8	Fiona Crawley (North Carolina); Carson Tanguilig (North Carolina)	6	4	[11]
Loudmilla Bencheikh (Alabama); Anne Marie Hiser (Alabama)	4	6	9
Malaika Rapolu (Texas); Tanya Sasnouskaya (Texas)	3	4
Victoria Allen (Florida State); Amelia Bissett (Florida State)	6	6
4	Mia Kupres (Texas A&M); Mary Stoiana (Texas A&M)	4	6	[10]
Viktoriya Kanapatskaya (Syracuse); Miyuka Kimoto (Syracuse)	6	1	4
Eryn Cayetano (USC); Emma Charney (USC)	4	6
Ayana Akli (South Carolina); Sarah Hamner (South Carolina)	6	7^{5}
5-8	Elaine Chervinsky (Virginia); Melodie Collard (Virginia)	2	2
Sofia Cabezas (Tennessee); Elza Tomase (Tennessee)	6	6
Amelia Rajecki (NC State); Maddy Zampardo (NC State)	7^{4}	6
Samantha Nanere (Temple); Maiko Uchijima (Temple)	6	1

Second round
1	S Broadus (Pepperdine); J Tjen (Pepperdine)	6	6
A Arseneault (Auburn); D Bennett (Auburn)	3	4
5-8	F Crawley (North Carolina); C Tanguilig (North Carolina)	6	6
V Allen (Florida State); A Bissett (Florida State)	2	2
4	M Kupres (Texas A&M); M Stoiana (Texas A&M)	4	6	[10]
A Akli(South Carolina); S Hamner (South Carolina)	6	1	8
S Cabezas (Tennessee); E Tomase (Tennessee)	1	6	[11]
A Rajecki (NC State); M Zampardo (NC State)	6	1	9

Quarterfinals
1	S Broadus (Pepperdine); J Tjen (Pepperdine)	6	6
5-8	F Crawley (North Carolina); C Tanguilig (North Carolina)	2	2
4	M Kupres (Texas A&M); M Stoiana (Texas A&M)	3	2
S Cabezas (Tennessee); E Tomase (Tennessee)	6	6

Semifinals
1	S Broadus (Pepperdine); J Tjen (Pepperdine)	6	6
S Cabezas (Tennessee); E Tomase (Tennessee)	2	1

==== Bottom half ====
First round
Luciana Perry (Ohio State); Irina Cantos Siemers (Ohio State)	6	3	8
Katerina Mandelikova (FIU); Oyinlomo Quadre (FIU)	3	6	[10]
Abbey Forbes (North Carolina); Reilly Tran (North Carolina)	6	5	2
5-8	Metka Komac (Texas Tech); Avelina Sayfetdinova (Texas Tech)	4	7	[10]
Aysegul Mert (Georgia); Dasha Vidmanova (Georgia)	6	6
Xinyi Nong (Miami (FL)); Isabella Pfennig (Miami (FL))	2	2
Chelsea Fontenel (Arizona State); Patricija Spaka (Arizona State)	0	1
3	Dana Guzman (Oklahoma); Alina Shcherbinina (Oklahoma)	6	6
Celia-Belle Mohr (Vanderbilt); Anessa Lee (Vanderbilt)	7	7
Esha Velaga (Penn); Eileen Wang (Penn)	5	5
Connie Ma (Stanford); Alexandra Yepifanova (Stanford)	6	6	[10]
5-8	Jaedan Brown (Michigan); Kari Miller (Michigan)	4	7^{5}	5
Amelia Honer (UC Santa Barbara); Kira Reuter (UC Santa Barbara)	6	6
Sophie Abrams (NC State); Anna Zyryanova (NC State)	4	2
Carol Lee (Georgia Tech); Kate Sharabura (Georgia Tech)	5	2
2	Ange Oby Kajuru (Oklahoma State); Anastasiya Komar (Oklahoma State)	7	6

Second round
K Mandelikova (FIU); O Quadre (FIU)	5	1
5-8	M Komac (Texas Tech); A Sayfetdinova (Texas Tech)	7	6
A Mert (Georgia); D Vidmanova (Georgia)	6	6
3	D Guzman (Oklahoma); A Shcherbinina (Oklahoma)	3	4
C-B Mohr (Vanderbilt); A Lee (Vanderbilt)	6	6
C Ma (Stanford); A Yepifanova (Stanford)	4	0
A Honer (UC Santa Barbara); K Reuter (UC Santa Barbara)	5	6	6
2	A O Kajuru (Oklahoma State); A Komar (Oklahoma State)	7	4	[10]

Quarterfinals
5-8	M Komac (Texas Tech); A Sayfetdinova (Texas Tech)	6	4	9
A Mert (Georgia); D Vidmanova (Georgia)	3	6	[11]
C-B Mohr (Vanderbilt); A Lee (Vanderbilt)	7^{4}	4	[10]
2	A O Kajuru (Oklahoma State); A Komar (Oklahoma State)	6	6	7

Semifinals
A Mert (Georgia); D Vidmanova (Georgia)	6	6
C-B Mohr (Vanderbilt); A Lee (Vanderbilt)	4	4
