= 2025 NCAA Division I Women's Tennis Championships =

- Date: November 19–24, 2024; May 2–18, 2025
- Edition: 43rd
- Location: First, second, third rounds: Campus sites Remainder: Waco, Texas
- Venue: Hurd Tennis Center; Hosted by: Baylor University

Champions

Women's singles
- Dasha Vidmanova (Georgia) (Fall 2024)

Women's doubles
- Elaine Chervinsky and Melodie Collard (Virginia) (Fall 2024)

Women's team
- Georgia (Spring 2025)
- NCAA Division I Women's Tennis Championships

The 2025 NCAA Division I Women's Tennis Championships were the women's tennis tournaments played from November 19–24, 2024 and May 2 to May 18, 2025, at campus sites and Waco, Texas at the Hurd Tennis Center hosted by Baylor University. It was the 43rd edition of the NCAA Division I Women's Tennis Championship. As part of a two-year pilot program, the women's singles and doubles championships were conducted in the fall of 2024, while the team championships were played in the spring of 2025.

== Women's team championship ==
There were 64 teams selected for the women's team championship, 30 of which were automatic qualifiers from each Division 1 conference. The remaining 34 teams were selected at-large. Teams played two rounds of single-elimination matches in groups of four on May 2-3 at campus sites; the winners of those regionals advanced to a super-regional round on May 9 or 10, also held at campus sites. The remaining eight teams advanced to the championship rounds in Waco, Texas on May 15-18.

In the finals, Georgia swept Texas A&M in straight sets, avenging their loss in the championship final from the previous year. This was Georgia's third win in program history (1994, 2000).

=== Automatic qualifiers ===
The following 30 teams were automatic qualifiers, representing their conferences:

Conference	Team
American	Memphis
Atlantic 10	VCU
ACC	North Carolina
ASUN	Stetson
Big East	Xavier
Big Sky	Sacramento State
Big South	Charleston Southern
Big Ten	Ohio State
Big 12	Texas Tech
Big West	UC Santa Barbara
CAA	Elon
CUSA	FIU
Horizon	Youngstown State
Ivy	Harvard
MAAC	Quinnipiac
MAC	Buffalo
MEAC	South Carolina State
Missouri Valley	UIC
Mountain West	Boise State
Northeast	FDU
Ohio Valley	Bryant
Patriot	Boston University
SEC	Georgia
Southern	Furman
Southland	Stephen F. Austin
SWAC	Florida A&M
Summit	Denver
Sun Belt	Old Dominion
West Coast	Pepperdine
WAC	Grand Canyon

=== National seeds ===
Sixteen teams were selected as national seeds, and were guaranteed to host for the first two rounds, if they submitted a bid and met criteria.

1. Georgia (National Champions)
2. Texas A&M (runner-up)
3. Michigan (semifinals)
4. Ohio State (super regionals)
5. North Carolina (semifinals)
6. Oklahoma (second round)
7. Virginia (super regionals)
8. Duke (quarterfinals)
9. Auburn (super regionals)
10. Tennessee (quarterfinals)
11. Texas Tech (second round)
12. NC State (super regionals)
13. LSU (quarterfinals)
14. Texas (super regionals)
15. Vanderbilt (second round)
16. Washington (second round)

== Bracket ==
=== Bracket ===
Bold indicates winner. Host institutions for the first two rounds and Super Regionals are marked with an asterisk (*).

**First Round**; May 2, 2025; Campus sites
1	**Georgia***	**4**
Florida A&M	0
Athens, Georgia
Iowa	1
**Georgia Tech**	**4**
**California**	**4**
Sacramento State	0
Seattle, Washington
Stetson	0
16	**Washington***	**4**
9	**Auburn***	**4**
South Carolina State	0
Auburn, Alabama
Clemson	3
**Wisconsin**	**4**
**Florida Atlantic**	**4**
Old Dominion	1
Durham, North Carolina
Bryant	0
8	**Duke***	**4**
5	**North Carolina***	**4**
VCU	0
Chapel Hill, North Carolina
Kansas	0
**South Carolina**	**4**
**UCF**	**4**
Furman	1
Raleigh, North Carolina
Charleston So.	0
12	**NC State***	**4**
13	**LSU***	**4**
Stephen F. Austin	0
Baton Rouge, Louisiana
Memphis	0
**USC**	**4**
**Notre Dame**	**4**
UIC	0
Columbus, Ohio
Buffalo	0
4	**Ohio State***	**4**
3	**Michigan***	**4**
Youngstown State	0
Ann Arbor, Michigan
**Arizona State**	**4**
Ole Miss	1
Baylor	3
**Boise State**	**4**
Austin, Texas
Grand Canyon	0
14	**Texas***	**4**
11	**Texas Tech***	**4**
Boston Univ.	0
Lubbock, Texas
FIU	1
**Stanford**	**4**
**Oklahoma State**	**4**
Tulsa	0
Norman, Oklahoma
Denver	0
6	**Oklahoma***	**4**
7	**Virginia***	**4**
Fairleigh Dickinson	0
Charlottesville, Virginia
**Illinois**	**4**
Arizona	1
**Pepperdine**	**4**
Wake Forest	1
Knoxville, Tennessee
Elon	0
10	**Tennessee***	**4**
15	**Vanderbilt***	**4**
Xavier	0
Nashville, Tennessee
Harvard	0
**UCLA**	**4**
**UC Santa Barbara**	**4**
Rice	3
College Station, Texas
Quinnipiac	0
2	**Texas A&M***	**4**

**Second Round**; May 3, 2025; Campus sites
1	**Georgia**	**4**
Georgia Tech	0
**California**	**4**
16	Washington	0
9	**Auburn**	**4**
Wisconsin	1
Florida Atlantic	0
8	**Duke**	**4**
5	**North Carolina**	**4**
South Carolina	0
UCF	1
12	**NC State**	**4**
13	**LSU**	4
USC	1
Notre Dame	1
4	**Ohio State**	**4**
3	**Michigan**	**4**
Arizona State	0
Boise State	0
14	**Texas**	**4**
11	Texas Tech	1
**Stanford**	**4**
**Oklahoma State**	4
6	Oklahoma	2
7	**Virginia**	**4**
Illinois	1
Pepperdine	0
10	**Tennessee**	4
15	Vanderbilt	3
**UCLA**	**4**
UC Santa Barbara	1
2	**Texas A&M**	**4**

**Super Regionals**; May 9–10, 2025; Campus sites
1	**Georgia***	**4**
California	0
9	Auburn	2
8	**Duke***	**4**
5	**North Carolina***	**4**
12	NC State	2
13	**LSU**	**4**
4	Ohio State*	2
3	**Michigan***	**4**
14	Texas	3
Stanford	3
**Oklahoma State***	**4**
7	Virginia*	0
10	**Tennessee**	**4**
UCLA	2
2	**Texas A&M***	**4**

**Quarterfinals**; May 15, 2025; Waco
1	**Georgia**	**4**
8	Duke	1
5	**North Carolina**	**4**
13	LSU	2
3	**Michigan**	**4**
Oklahoma St.	0
10	Tennessee	2
2	**Texas A&M**	**4**

**Semifinals**; May 17, 2025; Waco
1	**Georgia**	**4**
5	North Carolina	0
3	Michigan	1
2	**Texas A&M**	**4**

**Championship**; May 18, 2025; Waco
1	**Georgia**	**4**
2	Texas A&M	0

Bracket source:

== Women's singles championship ==
There were 64 singles players that qualified for the women's singles championship, via competition in approved ITA qualifying pathway events. The tournament was played in the Fall of 2024 from November 19 to 24 in Waco, Texas.

Georgia senior Dasha Vidmanova won the women's singles title against Auburn junior DJ Bennett 6-3, 6-3.

=== National seeds ===
The following sixteen players were seeded for this tournament:

1. Mary Stoiana (Texas A&M)
2. Dasha Vidmanova (Georgia) (National Champion)
3. Maria Sholokhova (Wisconsin)
4. Elza Tomase (Tennessee)
5. Valerie Glozman (Stanford)
6. Connie Ma (Stanford)
7. Julia Fliegner (Michigan)
8. Sofia Johnson (Old Dominion)

Players ranked 9th–16th, listed by last name

- Savannah Broadus (Pepperdine)
- Julia Garcia Ruiz (Oklahoma)
- Sarah Hamner (South Carolina)
- Amelia Honer (UC Santa Barbara)
- Luciana Perry (Ohio State)
- Theadora Rabman (North Carolina)
- Bridget Stammel (Vanderbilt)
- Emilija Tverijonaite (Arizona State)

=== Draw ===
Bracket:

==== Finals ====
Quarterfinals
Elaine Chervinsky (Virginia)	5	7	0
DJ Bennett (Auburn)	7	5	6
9-16	Julia Garcia Ruiz (Oklahoma)	6	6
5	Valerie Glozman (Stanford)	1	1
7	Julia Fliegner (Michigan)	7^{4}	6
9-16	Luciana Perry (Ohio State)	6	3
Nicole Khirin (Texas A&M)	4	2
2	Dasha Vidmanova (Georgia)	6	6

Semifinals
DJ Bennett (Auburn)	6	3	7
9-16	Julia Garcia Ruiz (Oklahoma)	1	6	5
7	Julia Fliegner (Michigan)	6	2	2
2	Dasha Vidmanova (Georgia)	4	6	6

Final
DJ Bennett (Auburn)	3	3
2	Dasha Vidmanova (Georgia)	6	6

==== Section 1 ====
First round
1	Mary Stoiana (Texas A&M)	6	6
Kate Fakih (UCLA)	1	1
Piper Charney (Michigan)	6	6
Tatum Evans (North Carolina)	3	1
9–16	Emilija Tverijonaite (Arizona State)	5	2
Elaine Chervinsky (Virginia)	7	6
Alexis Blokhina (Stanford)	6	6
Valeria Ray (Vanderbilt)	1	3
8	Sofia Johnson (Old Dominion)	6	6
Esha Velaga (Penn)	4	2
DJ Bennett (Auburn)	6	6
Carmen Gallardo Guevara (Purdue)	4	1
9–16	Sarah Hamner (South Carolina)	7^{6}	6
Eleana Yu (Duke)	6	4
Xin Tong Wang (Wichita State)	4^{ret.}
Katja Wiersholm (California)	4

Second round
1	M Stoiana (Texas A&M)	6	7
P Charney (Michigan)	1	5
E Chervinsky (Virginia)	6	7
A Blokhina (Stanford)	3	5
8	S Johnson (Old Dominion)	4	2
D Bennett (Auburn)	6	6
9-16	S Hamner (South Carolina)	4	6	6
K Wiersholm (California)	6	1	7^{6}

Third round
1	M Stoiana (Texas A&M)	3	0
E Chervinsky (Virginia)	6	6
D Bennett (Auburn)	7^{5}	6
K Wiersholm (California)	6	3

Quarterfinals
E Chervinsky (Virginia)	5	7	0
D Bennett (Auburn)	7	5	6

==== Section 2 ====
First round
4	Elza Tomase (Tennessee)	6	6
Serafima Shastova (Syracuse)	3	1
Merna Refaat (Auburn)	6	6
Gracie Epps (Oklahoma State)	1	4
9-16	Julia Garcia Ruiz (Oklahoma)	6	7
Irina Balus (Duke)	2	5
Grace Piper (USC)	6	6
Lucie Petruzelova (Ole Miss)	2	4
5	Valerie Glozman (Stanford)	6	6
Zdena Safarova (Boise State)	0	2
Sara Ziodato (Virginia)	4	4
Lily Jones (Michigan)	6	6
9-16	Theadora Rabman (North Carolina)	4	6	6
Guillermina Grant (Georgia)	6	3	1
Andrea Beltran (Denver)	6	6
Oyinlomo Quadre (FIU)	2	3

Second round
4	E Tomase (Tennessee)	5	4
M Refaat (Auburn)	7	6	2
9-16	J G Ruiz (Oklahoma)	7^{1}	6
G Piper (USC)	6	3
5	V Glozman (Stanford)	6	4	7^{2}
L Jones (Michigan)	0	6	6
9-16	T Rabman (North Carolina)	7	6
A Beltran (Denver)	5	2

Third round
M Refaat (Auburn)	5	3
9-16	J G Ruiz (Oklahoma)	7	6
5	V Glozman (Stanford)	6	6
9-16	T Rabman (North Carolina)	4	2

Quarterfinals
9-16	J G Ruiz (Oklahoma)	6	6
5	V Glozman (Stanford)	1	1

==== Section 3 ====
First round
Anne-Christine Lutkemeyer (UCLA)	6	6
Ludmila Kareisova (Ole Miss)	1	2
Ozlem Uslu (Virginia Tech)	7^{7}	6
9-16	Bridget Stammel (Vanderbilt)	6	2
Alina Shcherbinina (Oklahoma)	3	6
Emma Jackson (Duke)	6	7^{3}
Raquel Gonzalez (Miami (FL))	1	1
7	Julia Fliegner (Michigan)	6	6
Kaitlyn Carnicella (South Carolina)	7	2	2
Lan Mi (California)	5	6	6
Daria Smetannikov (Texas A&M)	6	4	2
9-16	Luciana Perry (Ohio State)	2	6	6
Carson Tanguilig (North Carolina)	6	6
Ariana Anazagasty-Pursoo (Texas)	4	3
Catherine Aulia (Tennessee)	6	7
3	Maria Sholokhova (Wisconsin)	3	5

Second round
A-C Lutkemeyer (UCLA)	6	6	0
O Uslu (Virginia Tech)	0	7^{4}	6
E Jackson (Duke)	3	3
7	J Fliegner (Michigan)	6	6
L Mi (California)	3	6	4
9-16	L Perry (Ohio State)	6	2	6
C Tanguilig (North Carolina)	4	6	6
C Aulia (Tennessee)	6	4	0

Third round
O Uslu (Virginia Tech)	2	4
7	J Fliegner (Michigan)	6	6
9-16	L Perry (Ohio State)	6	6
C Tanguilig (North Carolina)	2	3

Quarterfinals
7	J Fliegner (Michigan)	7^{4}	6
9-16	L Perry (Ohio State)	6	3

==== Section 4 ====
First round
Shavit Kimchi (Duke)	6	1	5
Nicole Khirin (Texas A&M)	3	6	7
Sabine Rutlauka (Penn)	6
9-16	Amelia Honer (UC Santa Barbara)	1	ret.
Mao Mushika (California)	6	6
Angella Okutoyi (Auburn)	3	2
Ekaterina Khayrutdinova (FIU)	3	2
6	Connie Ma (Stanford)	6	6
Annabelle Xu (Virginia)	3	7^{5}	6
Elise Wagle (UCLA)	6	6	1
Anaelle Leclerq-Ficher (Ole Miss)	2	4
9-16	Savannah Broadus (Pepperdine)	6	6
Kailey Evans (San Diego)	6	7^{4}
Olivia Benton (Boston College)	3	6
Anastasiya Komar (Oklahoma State)	3	2
2	Dasha Vidmanova (Georgia)	6	6

Second round
N Khirin (Texas A&M)	6	6
S Rutlauka (Penn)	4	1
M Mushika (California)	2	2
6	C Ma (Stanford)	6	6
A Xu (Virginia)	0	3
9-16	S Broadus (Pepperdine)	6	6
K Evans (San Diego)	3	6	0
2	D Vidmanova (Georgia)	6	3	6

Third round
N Khirin (Texas A&M)	7	6	6
6	C Ma (Stanford)	5	7^{6}	3
9-16	S Broadus (Pepperdine)	2	3
2	D Vidmanova (Georgia)	6	6

Quarterfinals
N Khirin (Texas A&M)	4	2
2	D Vidmanova (Georgia)	6	6

== Women's doubles championship ==
32 doubles teams qualified for the women's doubles championship, via competition in approved ITA qualifying pathway events. The tournament was played at the same time as the singles championship in the Fall of 2024 from November 19 to 24 in Waco, Texas.

Elaine Chervinsky and Melodie Collard of Virginia beat Olivia Center and Kate Fakih of UCLA, to win the women's double title.

=== National seeds ===
The following eight teams were seeded for this tournament:

1. Kimmi Hance / Elise Wagle (UCLA)
2. Gabriella Broadfoot / Maddy Zampardo (NC State)
3. Avelina Sayfetdinova / Mariia Hlahola (Texas Tech)
4. Savannah Broadus / Vivian Yang (Pepperdine)

Players ranked 5th–8th, listed by institution

- Liubov Kostenko / Cristina Tiglea (Baylor)
- Carson Tanguilig / Susanna Maltby (North Carolina)
- Jade Otway / Isabel Pascual (TCU)
- Olivia Center / Kate Fakih (UCLA)

=== Draw ===
Bracket:

==== Finals ====
Semifinals
Rachel Gailis (Florida); Alicia Dudeney (Florida)	6	3	8
Melodie Collard (Virginia); Elaine Chervinsky (Virginia)	1	6	[10]
Ava Hrastar (Auburn); DJ Bennett (Auburn)	2	6	7
5-8	Olivia Center (UCLA); Kate Fakih (UCLA)	6	3	[10]

Final
Melodie Collard (Virginia); Elaine Chervinsky (Virginia)	4	6	[10]
Olivia Center (UCLA); Kate Fakih (UCLA)	6	3	5

==== Top half ====
First round
1	Kimmi Hance (UCLA); Elise Wagle (UCLA)	6	6
Mao Mushika (California); Jessica Alsola (California)	3	3
Rachel Gailis (Florida); Alicia Dudeney (Florida)	6	6
Lily Jones (Michigan); Jessica Bernales (Michigan)	1	3
5-8	Liubov Kostenko (Baylor); Cristina Tiglea (Baylor)	2	4
Lily Fairclough (USC); Grace Piper (USC)	6	6
Irina Balus (Duke); Elizabeth Coleman (Duke)	5	6	[10]
Elza Tomase (Tennessee); Catherine Aulia (Tennessee)	7	4	6
4	Savannah Broadus (Pepperdine); Vivian Yang (Pepperdine)	5	6	[14]
Guillermina Grant (Georgia); Aysegul Mert (Georgia)	7	2	[16]
Reece Carter (Washington); Alexia Jacobs (Washington)	5	6	7
Melodie Collard (Virginia); Elaine Chervinsky (Virginia)	7	2	[10]
5-8	Carson Tanguilig (North Carolina); Susanna Maltby (North Carolina)	6	4	[10]
Abby Nugent (Xavier); Clara Owen (Xavier)	3	6	2
Celia Belle Mohr (Vanderbilt); Sophia Webster (Vanderbilt)	6	6
Stephanie Yakoff (Harvard); Kavya Karra (Harvard)	4	3

Second round
1	K Hance (UCLA); E Wagle (UCLA)	4	3
R Gailis (Florida); A Dudeney (Florida)	6	6
L Fairclough (USC); G Piper (USC)	5	3
I Balus (Duke); E Coleman (Duke)	7	6
G Grant (Georgia); A Mert (Georgia)	2	6	7
M Collard(Virginia); E Chervinsky (Virginia)	6	4	[10]
5-8	C Tanguilig (North Carolina); S Maltby (North Carolina)	6	6
C B Mohr (Vanderbilt); S Webster (Vanderbilt)	3	2

Quarterfinals
R Gailis (Florida); A Dudeney (Florida)	6	6
5-8	I Balus (Duke); E Coleman (Duke)	4	1
M Collard (Virginia); E Chervinsky (Virginia)	6	0	[10]
5-8	C Tanguilig (North Carolina); S Maltby (North Carolina)	0	6	7

Semifinals
R Gailis (Florida); A Dudeney (Florida)	6	3	8
M Collard (Virginia); E Chervinsky (Virginia)	1	6	[10]

==== Bottom half ====
First round
Maiko Uchijima (Penn State); Olivia Dorner (Penn State)	6	3	6
Anya Nelson (Colorado); Ema Bubalo (Colorado)	3	6	[10]
Given Roach (Georgia Tech); Alejandra Cruz (Georgia Tech)	5	4
5-8	Jade Otway (TCU); Isabel Pascual (TCU)	7	6
Ava Hrastar (Auburn); DJ Bennett (Auburn)	6	6
Isabella Romanichen (App State); Savannah Dada-Mascoll (App State)	1	4
Martina Genis Salas (Virginia); Annabelle Xu (Virginia)	6	6
3	Avelina Sayfetdinova (Texas Tech); Mariia Hlahola (Texas Tech)	4	0
Valerie Glozman (Stanford); Connie Ma (Stanford)	4	2
Alina Mukhortova (Wisconsin); Maria Sholokhova (Wisconsin)	6	6
Ludmila Kareisova (Ole Miss); Anaelle Leclerq-Ficher (Ole Miss)	4	2
5-8	Olivia Center (UCLA); Kate Fakih (UCLA)	6	6
Kendall Kovick (BYU); Yujia Huang (BYU)	6	5
Theadora Rabman (North Carolina); Tatum Evans (North Carolina)	7^{1}	7
Maria Berlanga (Tulsa); Lily Hutchings (Tulsa)	5	2
2	Gabriella Broadfoot (NC State); Maddy Zampardo (NC State)	7	6

Second round
A Nelson (Colorado); E Bubalo (Colorado)	3	2
5-8	J Otway (TCU); I Pascual (TCU)	6	6
A Hrastar (Auburn); D Bennett (Auburn)	7^{5}	6
M Genis Salas (Virginia); A Xu (Virginia)	6	4
A Mukhortova (Wisconsin); M Sholokhova (Wisconsin)	6	5	6
5-8	O Center (UCLA); K Fakih (UCLA)	2	7	[10]
T Rabman (North Carolina); T Evans (North Carolina)	4	6	4
2	G Broadfoot (NC State); M Zampardo (NC State)	6	4	[10]

Quarterfinals
5-8	J Otway (TCU); I Pascual (TCU)	6	4	7
A Hrastar (Auburn); D Bennett (Auburn)	4	6	[10]
5-8	O Center (UCLA); K Fakih (UCLA)	6	7^{5}
2	G Broadfoot (NC State); M Zampardo (NC State)	2	6

Semifinals
A Hrastar (Auburn); D Bennett (Auburn)	2	6	7
5-8	O Center (UCLA); K Fakih (UCLA)	6	3	[10]
