= 2023 NCAA Division I Women's Tennis Championships =

- Date: May 5–20, 2023
- Edition: 41st
- Location: First, second, third rounds: Campus sites Remainder: Orlando, Florida
- Venue: USTA National Campus; Hosted by: University of Central Florida

Champions

Women's singles
- Tian Fangran (UCLA)

Women's doubles
- Fiona Crawley and Carson Tanguilig (North Carolina)

Women's team
- North Carolina
- NCAA Division I Women's Tennis Championships

The 2023 NCAA Division I Women's Tennis Championships were the women's tennis tournaments played from May 5 to May 20, 2023, at campus sites and Orlando, Florida, at the USTA National Campus. It was the 41st edition of the NCAA Division I Women's Tennis Championship.

== Women's team championship ==
There were 64 teams selected to the women's team championship, 31 of which were automatic qualifiers from each Division I conference. The remaining 33 teams were selected at-large. Teams played two rounds of single-elimination matches in groups of four from May 5–6 at campus sites; the winners of those regionals advanced to a super-regional round on May 12 or 13, also held at campus sites. The remaining eight teams advanced to the championship rounds in Orlando, Florida.

=== Automatic qualifiers ===
The following 31 teams were automatic qualifiers, representing their conferences:

Conference	Team
ACC	NC State
American	SMU
ASUN	North Florida
Atlantic 10	Fordham
Big East	Xavier
Big Sky	Weber State
Big South	Charleston Southern
Big Ten	Michigan
Big 12	Texas
Big West	Hawaii
CAA	William & Mary
Conference USA	FIU
Horizon	Youngstown State
Ivy	Princeton
MAAC	Quinnipiac
MAC	Ball State
MEAC	South Carolina State
Missouri Valley	Drake
Mountain West	UNLV
Northeast	LIU
Ohio Valley	Southeast Missouri State
Pac-12	Stanford
Patriot	Boston University
SEC	Georgia
Southern	East Tennessee State
Southland	Texas A&M–Corpus Christi
Summit	Denver
Sun Belt	Old Dominion
SWAC	Florida A&M
WAC	Grand Canyon
West Coast	Pepperdine

=== National seeds ===
Sixteen teams were selected as national seeds, and were guaranteed to host for the first two rounds, if they submitted a bid and met criteria.

1. North Carolina (National Champions)
2. Texas A&M (quarterfinals)
3. NC State (runner-up)
4. Georgia (semifinals)
5. Michigan (quarterfinals)
6. Duke (second round)
7. Stanford (semifinals)
8. Texas (quarterfinals)
9. Pepperdine (Super Regionals)
10. Ohio State (Super Regionals)
11. Iowa State (quarterfinals)
12. Virginia (Super Regionals)
13. Oklahoma (Super Regionals)
14. Miami (FL) (second round)
15. Tennessee (Super Regionals)
16. Florida (Super Regionals)

=== Bracket ===
Bold indicates winner. Host institutions for the first two rounds and Super Regionals are marked with an asterisk (*).

**First Round**; May 5, 2023; Campus sites
1	**North Carolina***	**4**
Charleston Southern	0
Chapel Hill, North Carolina
**Old Dominion**	**4**
South Carolina	2
**Georgia Tech**	**4**
UCF	1
Gainesville, Florida
North Florida	0
16	**Florida***	**4**
9	**Pepperdine***	**4**
Grand Canyon	0
Malibu, California
UNLV	0
**USC**	**4**
California	1
**San Diego**	**4**
Austin, Texas
Texas A&M–Corpus Christi	1
8	**Texas***	**4**
5	**Michigan***	**4**
Youngstown State	0
Ann Arbor, Michigan
Ball State	0
**Notre Dame**	**4**
**Princeton**	**4**
Fordham	0
Charlottesville, Virginia
LIU	0
12	**Virginia***	**4**
13	**Oklahoma***	**4**
Hawaii	0
Norman, Oklahoma
Arkansas	2
**Washington**	**4**
**Florida State**	**4**
Illinois	2
Athens, Georgia
Florida A&M	0
4	**Georgia***	**4**
3	**NC State***	**4**
South Carolina State	0
Raleigh, North Carolina
Charlotte	2
**Kansas**	**4**
**Auburn**	**4**
FIU	3
Coral Gables, Florida
Boston University	0
14	**Miami (FL)***	**4**
11	**Iowa State***	**4**
Drake	0
Ames, Iowa
LSU	1
**Wisconsin**	**4**
**UCLA**	**4**
Texas Tech	1
Durham, North Carolina
William & Mary	0
6	**Duke***	**4**
7	**Stanford***	**4**
Weber State	0
Stanford, California
Denver	1
**Oklahoma State**	**4**
**Vanderbilt**	**4**
ETSU	0
Columbus, Ohio
Xavier	0
10	**Ohio State***	**4**
15	**Tennessee***	**4**
Southeast Missouri State	0
Knoxville, Tennessee
**Wake Forest**	**4**
Arizona State	3
SMU	3
**Baylor**	**4**
College Station, Texas
Quinnipiac	0
2	**Texas A&M***	**4**

**Second Round**; May 6, 2023; Campus sites
1	**North Carolina**	**4**
Old Dominion	0
Georgia Tech	1
16	**Florida**	**4**
9	**Pepperdine**	**4**
USC	1
San Diego	0
8	**Texas**	**4**
5	**Michigan**	**4**
Notre Dame	1
Princeton	0
12	**Virginia**	**4**
13	**Oklahoma**	**4**
Washington	1
Florida State	0
4	**Georgia**	**4**
3	**NC State**	**4**
Kansas	0
**Auburn**	**4**
14	Miami (FL)	3
11	**Iowa State**	**4**
Wisconsin	1
**UCLA**	1
6	Duke	3
7	**Stanford**	**4**
Oklahoma State	1
Vanderbilt	2
10	**Ohio State**	4
15	**Tennessee**	**4**
Wake Forest	1
Baylor	0
2	**Texas A&M**	**4**

**Super Regionals**; May 12, 2023; Campus sites
1	**North Carolina***	**4**
16	Florida	1
9	Pepperdine	3
8	**Texas***	**4**
5	**Michigan***	**4**
12	Virginia	2
13	Oklahoma	1
4	**Georgia***	**4**
3	**NC State***	**4**
Auburn	0
11	**Iowa State**	**4**
UCLA	1
7	**Stanford***	**4**
Ohio State	1
15	Tennessee	1
2	**Texas A&M***	**4**

**Quarterfinals**; May 17, 2023; Orlando
1	**North Carolina**	**4**
8	Texas	2
5	Michigan	0
4	**Georgia**	**4**
3	**NC State**	**4**
11	Iowa State	3
7	**Stanford**	**4**
2	Texas A&M	0

**Semifinals**; May 19, 2023; Orlando
1	**North Carolina**	**4**
4	Georgia	0
3	**NC State**	**4**
7	Stanford	0

**Championship**; May 20, 2023; Orlando
1	**North Carolina**	**4**
3	NC State	1

Bracket source:

== Women's singles championship ==
There were 64 singles players selected to the women's singles championship, 12 of which were automatic qualifiers from each Division I conference with an eligible team ranked in the ITA Top 125. The remaining 52 players were selected at-large. The tournament was played following the team championship from May 22 to 27 in Orlando, Florida.

UCLA freshman Tian Fangran won the women's singles title against Oklahoma senior Layne Sleeth 6-4, 6-2.

=== Automatic qualifiers ===
The following 12 players were automatic qualifiers, representing their conferences:

Conference	Player	Team
ACC	Fiona Crawley	North Carolina
American	Marie Mattel	UCF
ASUN	Kit Gulihur	North Florida
Big Ten	Jaedan Brown	Michigan
Big 12	Layne Sleeth	Oklahoma
Big West	Amelia Honer	UC Santa Barbara
Ivy	Daria Frayman	Princeton
Pac-12	Maddy Sieg	USC
SEC	Mary Stoiana	Texas A&M
Summit	Taylor Melville	Denver
Sun Belt	Tatsiana Sasnouskaya	Old Dominion
West Coast	Janice Tjen	Pepperdine

=== National seeds ===
The following sixteen players were seeded for this tournament:

1. Fiona Crawley (North Carolina)
2. Mary Stoiana (Texas A&M)
3. Lea Ma (Georgia)
4. Dasha Vidmanova (Georgia)
5. Alexa Noel (Miami (FL))
6. Chloe Beck (Duke)
7. Diana Shnaider (NC State)
8. Reese Brantmeier (North Carolina)

Players ranked 9th–16th, listed by last name

- Ayana Akli (South Carolina)
- Daria Frayman (Princeton)
- Anastasiya Komar (LSU)
- Carol Lee (Georgia Tech)
- Maddy Sieg (USC)
- Alana Smith (NC State)
- Fangran Tian (UCLA) (National Champion)
- Janice Tjen (Pepperdine)

=== Draw ===
Bracket:

==== Finals ====
Quarterfinals
Amelia Rajecki (NC State)	6	6
9-16	Carol Lee (Georgia Tech)	4	3
Angelica Blake (Stanford)	6	4
Layne Sleeth (Oklahoma)	7^{4}	6
9-16	Ayana Akli (South Carolina)	1	6	3
9-16	Maddy Sieg (USC)	6	4	6
9-16	Fangran Tian (UCLA)	6	6
Kari Miller (Michigan)	4	2

Semifinals
Amelia Rajecki (NC State)	5	6	4
Layne Sleeth (Oklahoma)	7	4	6
9-16	Maddy Sieg (USC)	3	2
9-16	Fangran Tian (UCLA)	6	6

Final
Layne Sleeth (Oklahoma)	4	2
9-16	Fangran Tian (UCLA)	6	6

==== Section 1 ====
First round
1	Fiona Crawley (North Carolina)	6	6
Sara Dahlstrom (Florida)	4	1
Carolina Gomez-Alonso (Arkansas)	6	2	2
Irina Cantos Siemers (Ohio State)	4	6	6
9–16	Daria Frayman (Princeton)	6	5	6
Eryn Cayetano (USC)	0	7	3
Amelia Rajecki (NC State)	7^{1}	3	6
Sarah Hamner (South Carolina)	6	6	1
5	Alexa Noel (Miami (FL))	6	6
Lisa Zaar (Pepperdine)	4	4
Casie Wooten (Wake Forest)	6	2	6
Carolyn Ansari (Auburn)	4	6	7^{4}
9–16	Carol Lee (Georgia Tech)	6	6
Marie Mattel (UCF)	4	4
Abbey Forbes (North Carolina)	6	7^{4}	1
Elza Tomase (Tennessee)	7^{4}	6	6

Second round
1	F Crawley (North Carolina)	6	6
I C Siemers (Ohio State)	1	3
9-16	D Frayman (Princeton)	3	4
A Rajecki (NC State)	6	6
5	A Noel (Miami (FL))	6	6	3
C Ansari (Auburn)	2	7^{6}	6
9-16	C Lee (Georgia Tech)	6	6
E Tomase (Tennessee)	2	3

Third round
1	F Crawley (North Carolina)	1	6	3
A Rajecki (NC State)	6	1	6
C Ansari (Auburn)	6	5	0
9-16	C Lee (Georgia Tech)	3	7	6

Quarterfinals
A Rajecki (NC State)	6	6
9-16	C Lee (Georgia Tech)	4	3

==== Section 2 ====
First round
3	Lea Ma (Georgia)	6	4	6
Jessica Alsola (California)	4	6	4
Anika Yarlagadda (North Carolina)	7	6
Amelia Honer (UC Santa Barbara)	5	2
9-16	Anastasiya Komar (LSU)	4	6	2
Angelica Blake (Stanford)	6	1	6
Savannah Broadus (Pepperdine)	6	6
Florencia Urrutia (Kentucky)	0	1
6	Chloe Beck (Duke)	6	6
Taylor Melville (Denver)	3	4
Jaedan Brown (Michigan)	6	6
Salma Ewing (Texas A&M)	4	2
9-16	Alana Smith (NC State)	3	4
Tatsiana Sasnouskaya (Old Dominion)	6	6
Layne Sleeth (Oklahoma)	6	6
Julia Adams (Virginia)	2	3

Second round
3	L Ma (Georgia)	6	6	7
A Yarlagadda (North Carolina)	7^{6}	1	5
A Blake (Stanford)	7	6
S Broadus (Pepperdine)	5	2
6	C Beck (Duke)	6	5	6
J Brown (Michigan)	3	7	3
T Sasnouskaya (Old Dominion)	2	4
L Sleeth (Oklahoma)	6	6

Third round
3	L Ma (Georgia)	4	6
A Blake (Stanford)	6	7^{0}
6	C Beck (Duke)	6	6	6
L Sleeth (Oklahoma)	3	7^{5}	7^{2}

Quarterfinals
A Blake (Stanford)	6	4
L Sleeth (Oklahoma)	7^{4}	6

==== Section 3 ====
First round
Kylie Collins (LSU)	2	4
Ozlem Uslu (Virginia Tech)	6	6
Emma Jackson (Duke)	3	3
9-16	Ayana Akli (South Carolina)	6	6
Sydni Ratliff (Ohio State)	6	3
Carly Briggs (Florida)	7^{1}	6
Page Freeman (Virginia)	6	6	6
Anna Arkadianou (Florida State)	1	7^{5}	3
Carson Tanguilig (North Carolina)	6	1	6
Emmanouela Antonaki (Mississippi State)	3	6	1
Rebeka Mertena (Tennessee)	4	1
9-16	Maddy Sieg (USC)	6	6
Kelly Keller (Arkansas)	6	2	1
Julia Fliegner (Michigan)	3	6	6
Kit Gulihur (North Florida)	6	5	3
4	Dasha Vidmanova (Georgia)	4	7	6

Second round
O Uslu (Virginia Tech)	0	1
9-16	A Akli (South Carolina)	6	6
C Briggs (Florida)	6	6
P Freeman (Virginia)	2	2
C Tanguilig (North Carolina)	2	0
9-16	M Sieg (USC)	6	6
J Fliegner (Michigan)	2	3
4	D Vidmanova (Georgia)	6	6

Third round
9-16	A Akli (South Carolina)	6	7
C Briggs (Florida)	4	5
9-16	M Sieg (USC)	4	6	6
4	D Vidmanova (Georgia)	6	2	2

Quarterfinals
9-16	A Akli (South Carolina)	1	6	3
9-16	M Sieg (USC)	6	4	6

==== Section 4 ====
First round
Natasha Subhash (Virginia)	6	4	6
Daria Kuczer (Tennessee)	2	6	4
Thasaporn Naklo (Iowa State)	4	4
9-16	Fangran Tian (UCLA)	6	6
Alexandra Yepifanova (Stanford)	6	6
Ava Markham (Wisconsin)	4	3
Mell Reasco (Georgia)	2	6	7^{4}
8	Reese Brantmeier (North Carolina)	6	2	6
Ariana Arseneault (Auburn)	6	6	6
Kylie Bilchev (Georgia Tech)	4	7^{4}	4
Celia Belle-Mohr (Vanderbilt)	5	6	7^{5}
9-16	Janice Tjen (Pepperdine)	7	3	6
Ludmila Kareisova (Ole Miss)	5	1
Kari Miller (Michigan)	7	6
Georgia Drummy (Duke)	1	7^{4}	6
2	Mary Stoiana (Texas A&M)	6	6	4

Second round
N Subhash (Virginia)	4	1
9-16	F Tian (UCLA)	6	6
A Yepifanova (Stanford)	7^{3}	6
M Reasco (Georgia)	6	3
A Arseneault (Auburn)	6	6
C-B Mohr (Vanderbilt)	3	4
K Miller (Michigan)	7	7
G Drummy (Duke)	5	5

Third round
9-16	F Tian (UCLA)	7	6
A Yepifanova (Stanford)	5	3
A Arseneault (Auburn)	1	2
K Miller (Michigan)	6	6

Quarterfinals
9-16	F Tian (UCLA)	6	6
K Miller (Michigan)	4	2

== Women's doubles championship ==
There were 32 doubles teams selected to the women's doubles championship, 12 of whom were automatic qualifiers from each Division I conference with an eligible team ranked in the ITA Top 60. The remaining 20 teams were selected at-large. The tournament was played following the team championship from May 23 to 27 in Orlando, Florida.

Fiona Crawley and Carson Tanguilig of North Carolina beat Reese Brantmeier and Elizabeth Scotty, also representing North Carolina, to win the women's double title.

=== Automatic qualifiers ===
The following 12 teams were automatic qualifiers, representing their conferences:

Conference	Player	Team
ACC	Diana Shnaider	NC State
ACC	Alana Smith	NC State
American	Maiko Uchijima	Temple
American	Jamie Wei	Temple
Big 12	Carmen Corley	Oklahoma
Big 12	Ivana Corley	Oklahoma
Big Ten	Jaedan Brown	Michigan
Big Ten	Kari Miller	Michigan
Big West	Amelia Honer	UC Santa Barbara
Big West	Kira Reuter	UC Santa Barbara
Colonial	Adel-Byanu Abidullina	Delaware
Colonial	Eliza Askarova	Delaware
Ivy	Daria Frayman	Princeton
Ivy	Grace Joyce	Princeton
Mountain West	Yinglak Jittakoat	Fresno State
Mountain West	Matilde Magrini	Fresno State
Pac-12	Kimmi Hance	UCLA
Pac-12	Elise Wagle	UCLA
SEC	Carson Branstine	Texas A&M
SEC	Mary Stoiana	Texas A&M
Sun Belt	Sofia Johnson	Old Dominion
Sun Belt	Tatsiana Sasnouskaya	Old Dominion
West Coast	Savannah Broadus	Pepperdine
West Coast	Janice Tjen	Pepperdine

=== National seeds ===
The following eight teams were seeded for this tournament:

1. Savannah Broadus / Janice Tjen (Pepperdine)
2. Carson Branstine / Mary Stoiana (Texas A&M)
3. Jaedan Brown / Kari Miller (Michigan)
4. Diana Shnaider / Alana Smith (NC State)

Players ranked 5th–8th, listed by institution

- Kylie Collins / Anastasiya Komar (LSU)
- Reese Brantmeier / Elizabeth Scotty (North Carolina)
- Carmen Corley / Ivana Corley (Oklahoma)
- Kimmi Hance / Elise Wagle (UCLA)

=== Draw ===
Bracket:

==== Finals ====
Semifinals
Fiona Crawley (North Carolina); Carson Tanguilig (North Carolina)	6	7^{3}
Julia Adams (Virginia); Melodie Collard (Virginia)	4	6
Eryn Cayetano (USC); Maddy Sieg (USC)	4	3
5-8	Reese Brantmeier (North Carolina); Elizabeth Scotty (North Carolina)	6	6

Final
Fiona Crawley (North Carolina); Carson Tanguilig (North Carolina)	6	2	[11]
5-8	Reese Brantmeier (North Carolina); Elizabeth Scotty (North Carolina)	1	6	[9]

==== Top half ====
First round
1	Savannah Broadus (Pepperdine); Janice Tjen (Pepperdine)	6	6
Alexa Noel (Miami (FL)); Isabella Pfennig (Miami (FL))	1	2
Guillermina Grant (Georgia); Mai Nirundorn (Georgia)	4	0
Fiona Crawley (North Carolina); Carson Tanguilig (North Carolina)	6	6
5-8	Kylie Collins (LSU); Anastasiya Komar (LSU)	6	4	[14]
Samantha Alicea (Nebraska); Raphaelle Lacasse (Nebraska)	3	6	[12]
Adel-Byanu Abidullina (Delaware); Eliza Askarova (Delaware)	4	7	4
Alicia Dudeney (Florida); Bente Spee (Florida)	6	5	[10]
4	Carmen Corley (Oklahoma State); Ivana Corley (Oklahoma State)	6	4	[10]
Sofia Johnson (Old Dominion); Tatsiana Sasnouskaya (Old Dominion)	3	6	[12]
Katherine Duong (Illinois); Megan Heuser (Illinois)	6	7^{1}
Yinglak Jittakoat (Fresno State); Matilde Magrini (Fresno State)	1	6
5-8	Nell Miller (NC State); Amelia Rajecki (NC State)	6	6
Angelica Blake (Stanford); Alexis Blokhina (Stanford)	4	1
Julia Adams (Virginia); Melodie Collard (Virginia)	6	6
Amelia Honer (UC Santa Barbara); Kira Reuter (UC Santa Barbara)	4	3

Second round
1	S Broadus (Pepperdine); J Tjen (Pepperdine)	1	1
F Crawley (North Carolina); C Tanguilig (North Carolina)	6	6
5-8	K Collins (LSU); A Komar (LSU)	1	6
A Dudeney (Florida); B Spee (Florida)	6	7^{4}
S Johnson (Old Dominion); T Sasnouskaya (Old Dominion)	7	3	7
K Duong (Illinois); M Heuser (Illinois)	5	6	[10]
5-8	N Miller (NC State); A Rajecki (NC State)	6	6
J Adams (Virginia); M Collard (Virginia)	7^{4}	7^{7}

Quarterfinals
F Crawley (North Carolina); C Tanguilig (North Carolina)	6	6
A Dudeney (Florida); B Spee (Florida)	1	2
K Duong (Illinois); M Heuser (Illinois)	1	3
J Adams (Virginia); M Collard (Virginia)	6	6

Semifinals
F Crawley (North Carolina); C Tanguilig (North Carolina)	6	7^{3}
J Adams (Virginia); M Collard (Virginia)	4	6

==== Bottom half ====
First round
Ayana Akli (South Carolina); Sarah Hamner (South Carolina)	6	6
Julia Andreach (Notre Dame); Carrie Beckman (Notre Dame)	2	3
Salma Ewing (Texas A&M); Jayci Goldsmith (Texas A&M)	6	6
5-8	Kimmi Hance (UCLA); Elise Wagle (UCLA)	2	2
Anna Brylin (Wake Forest); Brooke Killingsworth (Wake Forest)	7^{5}	5	[10]
Raquel Gonzalez (Oklahoma State); Ayumi Miyamoto (Oklahoma State)	6	7	7
Eryn Cayetano (USC); Maddy Sieg (USC)	6	7^{3}
Mia Kupres (Texas A&M); Mary Stoiana (Texas A&M)	2	6
Daria Frayman (Princeton); Grace Joyce (Princeton)	0	6
Patricija Spaka (Arizona State); Domenika Turkovic (Arizona State)	6	7^{2}
Jessica Alsola (California); Katja Wiersholm (California)	1	2
5-8	Reese Brantmeier (North Carolina); Elizabeth Scotty (North Carolina)	6	6
Kailey Evans (San Diego); Elizabeth Goldsmith (San Diego)	7^{6}	7^{6}
Carolyn Ansari (Auburn); Ariana Arseneault (Auburn)	6	6
Maiko Uchijima (Temple); Jamie Wei (Temple)	1	1
2	Jaedan Brown (Michigan); Kari Miller (Michigan)	6	6

Second round
A Akli (South Carolina); S Hamner (South Carolina)	7^{7}	6
S Ewing (Texas A&M); J Goldsmith (Texas A&M)	6	3
A Brylin (Wake Forest); B Killingsworth (Wake Forest)	3	4
E Cayetano (USC); M Sieg (USC)	6	6
P Spaka (Arizona State); D Turkovic (Arizona State)	0	5
5-8	R Brantmeier (North Carolina); E Scotty (North Carolina)	6	7
K Evans (San Diego); E Goldsmith (San Diego)	4	2
2	J Brown (Michigan); K Miller (Michigan)	6	6

Quarterfinals
A Akli (South Carolina); S Hamner (South Carolina)	7	3	3
E Cayetano (USC); M Sieg (USC)	5	6	[10]
5-8	R Brantmeier (North Carolina); E Scotty (North Carolina)	7^{3}	6	[10]
2	J Brown (Michigan); K Miller (Michigan)	6	7^{5}	8

Semifinals
E Cayetano (USC); M Sieg (USC)	4	3
5-8	R Brantmeier (North Carolina); E Scotty (North Carolina)	6	6
