= Reese Brantmeier =

American tennis player (born 2004)

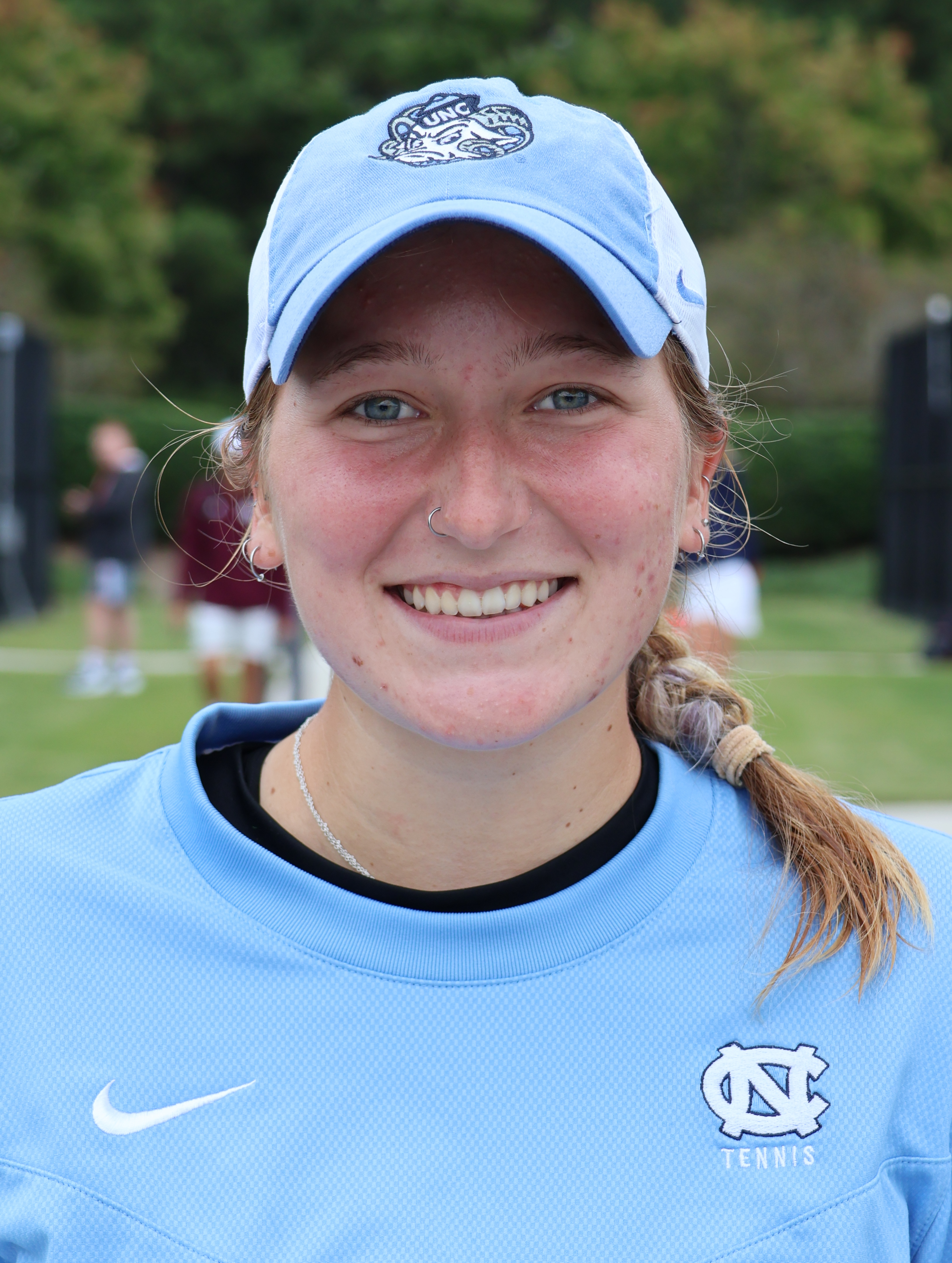
- Brantmeier in 2023
- Country (sports): United States
- Born: October 5, 2004 (age 22) Cold Spring, Wisconsin, US
- Height: 170 cm (5 ft 7 in)
- Plays: Right-handed
- College: North Carolina (2023–2026)
- Prize money: $174,106

Singles
- Career record: 49–42
- Career titles: 2 ITF
- Highest ranking: No. 181 (November 9, 2026)
- Current ranking: No. 181 (November 9, 2026)

Grand Slam singles results
- US Open: 1R (2026)

Doubles
- Career record: 40–26
- Career titles: 3 ITF
- Highest ranking: No. 205 (November 9, 2026)
- Current ranking: No. 205 (November 9, 2026)

Grand Slam doubles results
- US Open: 2R (2022, 2025)

Grand Slam mixed doubles results
- US Open: 1R (2021)
- Last updated on: July 15, 2026.

Reese Brantmeier (born October 5, 2004) is an American tennis player. She played college tennis for the North Carolina Tar Heels, winning NCAA team (2023) and singles championships (2026).

Brantmeier has a career-high singles ranking by the WTA of No. 181, achieved on November 9, 2026. On November 9, 2026, she peaked at No. 205 in the doubles rankings.

== Early life and junior tour ==
Brantmeier was born to Scott and Becky Brantmeier and raised near Whitewater, Wisconsin. Her father is a doctor and she has two brothers. She began online schooling and living out of a hotel room with her mother while training at the USTA National Campus in Orlando, Florida.

Brantmeier won the 2019 United States 16s national title. She finished second at the 2021 United States 18s national championship, losing to Ashlyn Krueger.

At the 2022 US Open, she and Clervie Ngounoue received a wildcard to the women's doubles tournament.

== College ==
Brantmeier began playing college tennis for the North Carolina Tar Heels in the spring of 2023. She did not play in the fall of 2022 to avoid being ruled ineligible by the NCAA for collecting prize money during high school; she later filed suit against the NCAA over the rule. In that year's NCAA Championships, she helped North Carolina win their first national team title. She played on the team's No. 3 court in place of Fiona Crawley, beating multiple ranked players during their run including Georgia's national No. 3 Lea Ma in the semifinals. Though she lost to North Carolina State standout Diana Shnaider in the final, she and Reilly Tran had won the deciding doubles match that gave North Carolina an early lead. Brantmeier also reached the NCAA doubles tournament final with Elizabeth Scotty, losing to North Carolina teammates Crawley and Carson Tanguilig.

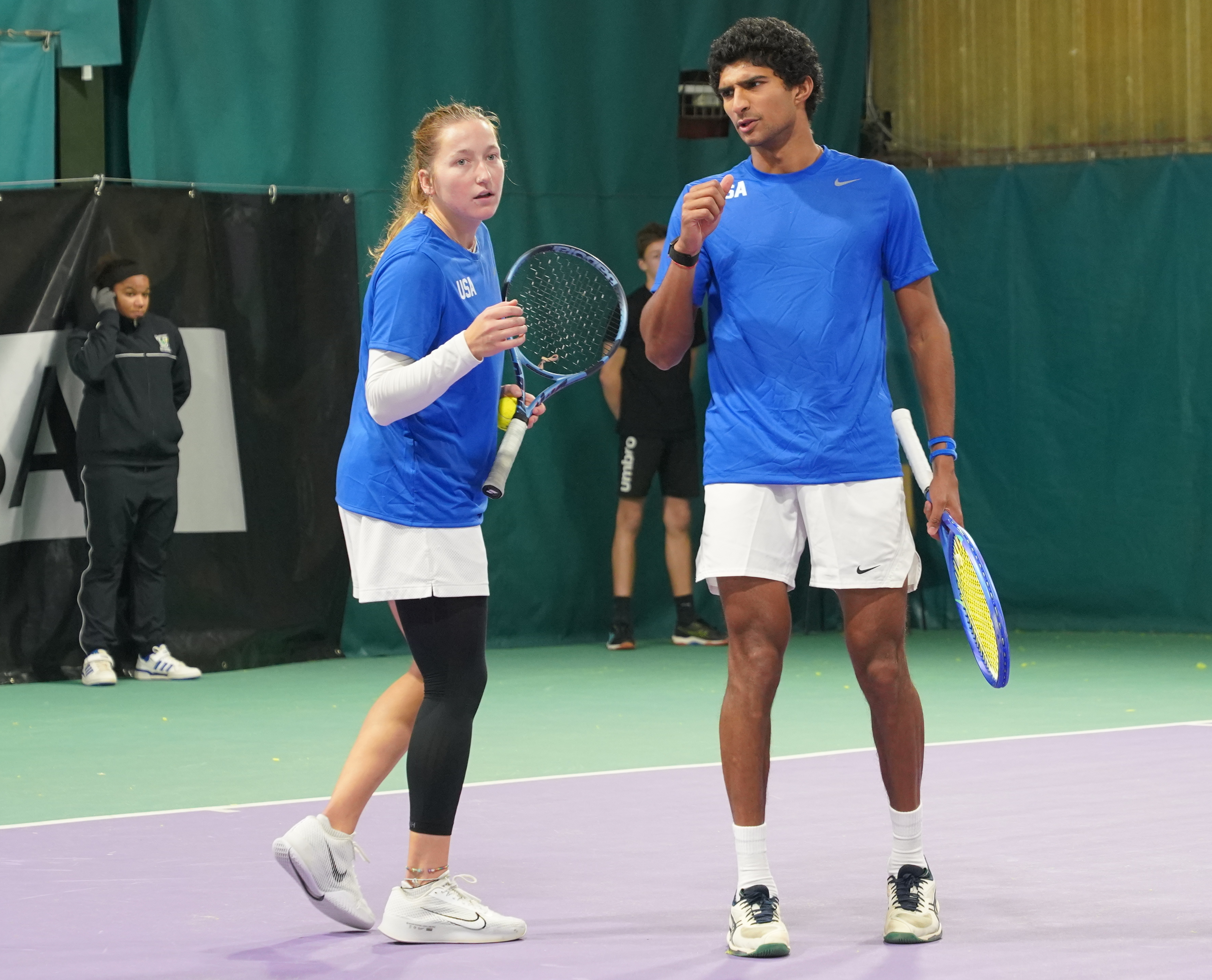
Brantmeier with Samir Banerjee in 2025

Brantmeier swept the Intercollegiate Tennis Association (ITA) Fall National Championships in the fall of 2023, winning national titles in singles and doubles with Scotty. In the spring of 2024, she tore her meniscus during the ITA National Team Indoor Championship, ruling her out for the season.

In the fall of 2025, Brantmeier won the NCAA singles title.

== Career ==
In September 2026, Brantmeier reached her first singles WTA 125 final at the 2026 Porto Open, as a qualifier, but lost to Maria Timofeeva.

== WTA 125 finals ==
=== Singles: 1 (runner-up) ===
Result	W–L	Date	Tournament	Surface	Opponent	Score
Loss	0–1	Sep 2026	Porto Open, Portugal	Hard	(Uzbekistan) Maria Timofeeva	6–7^{(8–10)}, 2–6

== ITF Circuit finals ==
=== Singles: 7 (4 titles, 3 runner-ups) ===
Legend W100 tournaments (0–1) W75 tournaments (2–0) W25/35 tournaments (1–2) W15 tournaments (1–0)	Finals by surface Hard (4–2) Clay (0–1)

Result	W–L	Date	Tournament	Tier	Surface	Opponent	Score
Loss	0–1	May 2022	ITF Daytona Beach, US	W25	Clay	(United States) Katrina Scott	2–6, 4–6
Loss	0–2	Oct 2022	ITF Fort Worth, United States	W25	Hard	(United States) Liv Hovde	6–7^{(1–7)}, 4–6
Win	1–2	Jul 2023	ITF Lakewood, United States	W15	Hard	(United States) Haley Giavara	6–4, 6–4
Win	2–2	May 2026	ITF Wichita, United States	W35	Hard	(India) Sahaja Yamalapalli	6–4, 6–0
Loss	2–3	Jun 2026	Palmetto Pro Open, US	W100	Hard	Kristina Liutova	4–6, 3–6
Win	3–3	Oct 2026	Challenger de Saguenay, Canada	W75	Hard (i)	(Japan) Yuki Naito	7–6^{(10–8)}, 7–6^{(9–7)}
Win	4–3	Oct 2026	Tevlin Women's Challenger, Canada	W75	Hard (i)	(Canada) Katherine Sebov	6–3, 6–1

=== Doubles: 9 (6 titles, 3 runner-ups) ===
Legend W60/75 tournaments (2–1) W50 tournaments (1–0) W25/35 tournaments (3–0) W15 tournaments (0–2)	Finals by surface Hard (5–1) Clay (1–2)

Result	W–L	Date	Tournament	Tier	Surface	Partner	Opponents	Score
Loss	0–1	May 2019	ITF Naples, US	W15	Clay	(United States) Kimmi Hance	(United States) Mara Schmidt (Australia) Belinda Woolcock	3–6, 7–5, [6–10]
Loss	0–2	May 2022	Pelham Pro Classic, US	W60	Clay	(United States) Elvina Kalieva	(United States) Carolyn Ansari (Canada) Ariana Arseneault	5–7, 1–6
Win	1–2	Jan 2023	ITF Naples, US	W25	Clay	(United States) Makenna Jones	(United Kingdom) Emily Appleton (United States) Quinn Gleason	6–4, 6–2
Win	2–2	Jun 2023	ITF Wichita, US	W25	Hard	(United States) Maria Mateas	(United States) Ava Markham; Alina Shcherbinina	6–2, 6–4
Loss	2–3	Jul 2023	ITF Lakewood, US	W15	Hard	(United States) Fiona Crawley	(Ukraine) Anita Sahdiieva (United States) Savannah Broadus	3–6, 3–6
Win	3–3	May 2026	ITF Wichita, US	W35	Hard	Maria Sholokhova	(United States) Maya Iyengar; Ekaterina Khayrutdinova	6–3, 6–1
Win	4–3	Sep 2026	The Campus Open, Portugal	W75	Hard	(United States) Ayana Akli	(United States) Kylie Collins (United States) Carson Tanguilig	7–5, 6–4
Win	5–3	Oct 2026	ITF Quebec City, Canada	W50	Hard (i)	(United Kingdom) Mimi Xu	(Canada) Ariana Arseneault (Canada) Raphaëlle Lacasse	6–2, 6–7^{(5)}, [10–7]
Win	6–3	Oct 2026	Challenger de Saguenay, Canada	W75	Hard (i)	(United States) Carson Tanguilig	(Czech Republic) Michaela Bayerlová (Netherlands) Jasmijn Gimbrère	6–2, 7–6^{(3)}

== Junior Grand Slam finals ==
=== Doubles: 1 (runner-up) ===
Result	Year	Tournament	Surface	Partner	Opponents	Score
Loss	2021	US Open	Hard	(United States) Elvina Kalieva	(United States) Ashlyn Krueger (United States) Robin Montgomery	7–5, 3–6, [4–10]

Sporting positions
Preceded by (Philippines) Alex Eala / (Belarus) Evialina Laskevich	Orange Bowl Girls' Doubles Champion; 2020; With: (United States) Kimmi Hance	Succeeded by (Croatia) Petra Marčinko / (Russia) Diana Shnaider
