= Layne Sleeth =

Canadian tennis player (born 2001)

- Country (sports): Canada
- Born: 18 August 2001 (age 24) Markham, Canada
- Plays: Right handed (two-handed backhand)
- College: Oklahoma
- Prize money: $33,906

Singles
- Career record: 54–57
- Career titles: 1 ITF
- Highest ranking: No. 574 (29 July 2019)
- Current ranking: No. 726 (21 October 2024)

Doubles
- Career record: 24–27
- Career titles: 1 ITF
- Highest ranking: No. 332 (10 June 2024)
- Current ranking: No. 492 (21 October 2024)
- Last updated on: 21 October 2024.

Layne Sleeth (born 18 August 2001) is a Canadian professional tennis and pickleball player.

Playing college tennis for the Oklahoma, She played in the final 2023 NCAA Singles Championship, UCLA Chinese Tian Fangran 4–6, 2–6.

Sleeth has a career high WTA singles ranking of 574 achieved on 29 July 2019. She also has a career high WTA doubles ranking of 332 achieved on 10 June 2024.

Sleeth won her first major ITF title at the W40 doubles tournament in Guadalajara, Mexico, in November 2023.

== ITF Circuit finals ==
=== Singles: 1 (title) ===
| Legend W15 tournaments | Finals by surface Hard (1–0) |

| Result | W–L | Date | Tournament | Tier | Surface | Opponent | Score |
|---|---|---|---|---|---|---|---|
| Win | 1–0 | Jun 2019 | ITF Cancún, Mexico | W15 | Hard | (Brazil) Thaisa Grana Pedretti | 6–2, 6–1 |

=== Doubles: 1 (title) ===
| Legend W40/50 Tournaments | Finals by surface Clay (1–0) |

| Result | W–L | Date | Tournament | Tier | Surface | Partner | Opponents | Score |
|---|---|---|---|---|---|---|---|---|
| Win | 1–0 | Nov 2023 | ITF Guadalajara, Mexico | W40 | Clay | (United States) Haley Giavara | Veronika Miroshnichenko (Sweden) Fanny Östlund | 6–4, 6–3 |
