= Fiona Crawley =

American tennis player (born 2002)

- Crawley at the 2026 Wimbledon Championships
- Full name: Fiona Maeve Crawley
- Country (sports): United States
- Born: February 7, 2002 (age 24) San Antonio, Texas, US
- Height: 5 ft 6 in (168 cm)
- Plays: Right (two-handed backhand)
- College: North Carolina (2020–2024)
- Prize money: $281,405

Singles
- Career record: 98–47
- Career titles: 6 ITF
- Highest ranking: No. 182 (March 2, 2026)
- Current ranking: No. 236 (July 13, 2026)

Grand Slam singles results
- Wimbledon: Q3 (2026)
- US Open: 1R (2023)

Doubles
- Career record: 44–29
- Career titles: 3 ITF
- Highest ranking: No. 261 (March 2, 2026)
- Current ranking: No. 300 (July 13, 2026)

Grand Slam doubles results
- US Open: 1R (2023)
- Last updated on: July 14, 2026.

Fiona Maeve Crawley (born February 7, 2002) is an American tennis player. She played college tennis for the North Carolina Tar Heels, where she was ranked as high as No. 1 nationally and won the NCAA team championship in 2023 and reached quarterfinals in singles. She won the ITA National Fall Championships with Elizabeth Scotty in 2021 and the NCAA doubles title with Carson Tanguilig in 2023.

Crawley has a career-high WTA rankings of No. 182 in singles and No. 261 in doubles, and has won six singles titles and three doubles titles on the ITF Women's World Tennis Tour.

== Early life and junior tour ==
A native of San Antonio, Texas, Crawley took up tennis from age six to nine while living in Okinawa, Japan, where her father, Peter, was stationed as a member of the US Air Force. She comes from an athletic family: her father played soccer at Michigan State, and she used to train with her older siblings, Liam and Solène, who went on to play tennis at Trinity University and Colorado State, respectively.

Crawley was the No. 1–ranked girls tennis player in Texas in her age group from the age of ten. She competed at national junior events while attending Alamo Heights High School in San Antonio. In 2017, she won the United States Tennis Association (USTA) Girls' 16s National Clay Court Championships and the USTA 18s National Winter Championships, and finished runner-up in the Orange Bowl's under-16 event. In 2018, after winning the Texas Slam's under-18 event and the USTA Billie Jean King Girls' 16s National Championships, she earned a wildcard into the US Open junior tournament, but lost in the first round. Crawley played at a handful of ITF World Tennis Tour events beginning in 2017. She was considered the No. 1 recruit of the class of 2020.

== College ==
Crawley began playing college tennis at the University of North Carolina at Chapel Hill in 2020. In her freshman year, she compiled a 30–1 singles record, helping North Carolina win the ACC Championships and earn the top seed at the 2021 NCAA Team Championships, where they reached the semifinals.

As a sophomore in 2021–22, Crawley led Division I in singles wins with a 47–7 record, mostly playing in the No. 4 spot for North Carolina, and finished the season ranked No. 32 nationally. In doubles, she and teammate Elizabeth Scotty won the Intercollegiate Tennis Association (ITA) Carolina Regionals and the ITA Fall National Championships in San Diego. At the 2022 NCAA Championships, where top-seeded North Carolina again got to the team semifinals, an unseeded Crawley made a run to the semifinals of the individual competition.

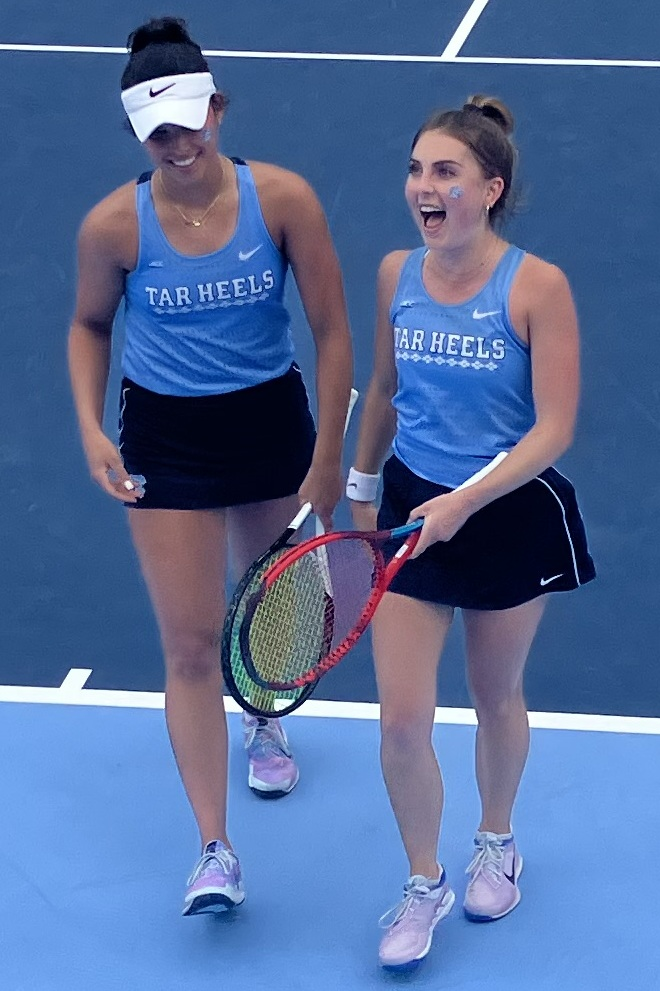
Carson Tanguilig and Crawley in 2023

Crawley started her junior season winning all 17 matches at ITA tournaments in the fall of 2022, including the ITA National Fall Championships, attaining the No. 1 in singles for the first time on November 16, 2022. North Carolina went undefeated as a team in the 2023 regular season. Crawley had only three losses in forty-nine singles matches as a junior, to Georgia's Lea Ma, and North Carolina State's Diana Shnaider (in the ACC final), and NC State's Amelia Rajecki (in the NCAA singles event's round of 16). After playing mostly in the team's No. 1 spot, she swapped with No. 2 Reese Brantmeier for the 2023 NCAA Championships, where they avenged their only loss of the year—to rival NC State in the ACC Championship—to win their first national team title. In doubles, Crawley and sophomore Carson Tanguilig were runners-up at the ITA National Fall Championships. At the end of the season they won the NCAA Doubles Championship, beating teammates Scotty and Brantmeier in the final. Crawley was named the ITA National Player of the Year and won the Honda Sports Award for the top college player.

Crawley went 18–5 in singles in her senior year, finishing her career ranked No. 15 nationally, and 20–4 in doubles, ranking No. 6 with Tanguilig. She helped North Carolina win the ACC championship but lost in the round of 16 of the NCAA tournament to eventual champions Texas A&M.

== Career ==
=== 2023: Professional & major debuts ===
Crawley was selected to the USTA Collegiate Summer Team in 2023. She previously made her WTA Tour debut in April 2023 at the Charleston Open, where she received a wildcard into the main draw. In June 2023, playing in her first ITF competition since July 2021, she reached the final of the W25 event in Wichita as a qualifier. Though she lost there to second seed Stacey Fung, the result led to her debut in the WTA rankings at No. 786 on July 3, 2023. The next month, she split two back-to-back W15 doubles finals in Lakewood, California, partnering college players Mary Stoiana of Texas A&M and North Carolina teammate Brantmeier.

In August 2023, Crawley made her major debut at the US Open. As a wildcard player, she progressed through the singles qualifying tournament by saving two match points in the first round (against Réka Luca Jani) and prevailing in third-set tiebreaks in two of her three qualifying wins. NCAA champions Crawley and Tanguilig were also awarded a wildcard into the doubles event. Crawley did not collect her US$81,000 in prize money because of NCAA restrictions on college athletes, something she considered unfair in light of name, image, and likeness (NIL) rules. She won her first ITF singles title in October 2023 at the W25 event in Florence, South Carolina, beating former Duke player Chloe Beck in the final.

=== 2024 ===
Crawley was again selected to the USTA Collegiate Summer Team in 2024.

== ITF Circuit finals ==
=== Singles: 11 (6 titles, 5 runner-ups) ===
Legend W75 tournaments (0–4) W50 tournaments (1–0) W25/35 tournaments (4–1) W15 tournaments (1–0)	Finals by surface Hard (6–5)

Result	W–L	Date	Tournament	Tier	Surface	Opponent	Score
Loss	0–1	Jun 2023	ITF Wichita, Kansas, United States	W25	Hard	(Canada) Stacey Fung	3–6, 2–6
Win	1–1	Oct 2023	ITF Florence, United States	W25	Hard	(United States) Chloe Beck	7–5, 6–1
Win	2–1	Jan 2024	ITF Arcadia, United States	W35	Hard	(United States) Ashley Lahey	4–6, 6–2, 7–5
Win	3–1	Jun 2024	ITF San Diego, United States	W15	Hard	(United States) Sara Daavettila	6–4, 1–6, 6–3
Win	4–1	Jun 2025	ITF Decatur, United States	W35	Hard	(Canada) Dasha Plekhanova	7–6^{(5)}, 6–4
Win	5–1	Jun 2025	ITF Wichita, United States	W35	Hard	(Japan) Mayu Crossley	6–0, 7–5
Loss	5–2	Jul 2025	Championnats de Granby, Canada	W75	Hard	(Australia) Talia Gibson	3–6, 4–6
Loss	5–3	Oct 2025	Toronto Challenger, Canada	W75	Hard (i)	(United Kingdom) Harriet Dart	2–6, 2–6
Win	6–3	Feb 2026	Porto Indoor, Portugal	W50	Hard (i)	(Bulgaria) Elizara Yaneva	6–7^{(4)}, 6–3, 6–4
Loss	6–4	Sep 2026	ITF Féminin Le Neubourg, France	W75	Hard	(Czech Republic) Anna Sisková	6–4, 2–6, 6–7^{(3)}
Loss	6–5	Oct 2026	GB Pro-Series Glasgow, United Kingdom	W75	Hard (i)	(Netherlands) Suzan Lamens	4–6, 3–6

=== Doubles: 7 (4 titles, 3 runner-ups) ===
Legend W75 tournaments (1–1) W50 tournaments (0–1) W35 tournaments (2–0) W15 tournaments (1–1)	Finals by surface Hard (3–3) Clay (1–0)

Result	W–L	Date	Tournament	Tier	Surface	Partner	Opponent	Score
Win	1–0	Jul 2023	ITF Lakewood, United States	W15	Hard	(United States) Mary Stoiana	(United States) Mary Lewis (United States) Brandy Walker	7–5, 6–7^{(3)}, [10–5]
Loss	1–1	Jul 2023	ITF Lakewood, United States	W15	Hard	(United States) Reese Brantmeier	(United States) Savannah Broadus (Ukraine) Anita Sahdiieva	3–6, 3–6
Win	2–1	Oct 2024	ITF Hilton Head Island, United States	W35	Hard	(United States) Makenna Jones	(Kenya) Angella Okutoyi (Egypt) Merna Refaat	6–2, 6–7^{(5)}, [10–7]
Win	3–1	May 2025	ITF Boca Raton, United States	W35	Clay	(United States) Alana Smith	(United States) Kayla Day (United States) Allura Zamarripa	6–4, 6–2
Loss	3–2	Sep 2025	Rancho Santa Fe Open, United States	W50	Hard	(United States) Jaeda Daniel	(Japan) Himeno Sakatsume (Japan) Wakana Sonobe	6–7^{(5)}, 6–3, [5–10]
Loss	3–3	Oct 2025	Toronto Challenger, Canada	W75	Hard (i)	(United States) Jaeda Daniel	(Slovakia) Viktória Hrunčáková; Anastasia Tikhonova	4–6, 2–6
Win	4–3	Jul 2026	Lexington Open, United States	W75	Hard	(United States) Ayana Akli	(United States) Savannah Broadus (United States) Kylie Collins	2–6, 7–6^{(7–3)}, [12–10]
