= 2023 US Open – Women's doubles =

First Canadian and New Zealander win US Open women's doubles

Women's doubles
- 2023 US Open

Final
- Champions: (Canada) Gabriela Dabrowski (New Zealand) Erin Routliffe
- Runners-up: (Germany) Laura Siegemund; Vera Zvonareva
- Score: 7–6^{(11–9)}, 6–3

Details
- Draw: 64
- Seeds: 16

Events
| Singles | men | women | | boys | girls |
| Doubles | men | women | mixed | boys | girls |
| WC Singles | men | women | quad | boys | girls |
| WC Doubles | men | women | quad | boys | girls |
- US Open

Gabriela Dabrowski and Erin Routliffe defeated Laura Siegemund and Vera Zvonareva in the final, 7–6^{(11–9)}, 6–3 to win the women's doubles tennis title at the 2023 US Open. Dabrowski became the first Canadian to win a women's doubles major title and Routliffe became the first New Zealander to win a US Open title.

Barbora Krejčíková and Kateřina Siniaková were the defending champions, but lost in the second round to Barbora Strýcová and Markéta Vondroušová. Strýcová, a former doubles world No. 1, was playing in her final tournament; she and Vondroušová withdrew from the tournament before their third round match against Dabrowski and Routliffe.

Coco Gauff and Jessica Pegula jointly attained the WTA No. 1 doubles ranking after Hsieh Su-wei lost in the semifinals. Siniaková, Elise Mertens, Taylor Townsend, and Desirae Krawczyk were also in contention for the top ranking at the beginning of the tournament.

== Seeds ==
1. (Czech Republic) Barbora Krejčíková / (Czech Republic) Kateřina Siniaková (second round)
2. (Australia) Storm Hunter / (Belgium) Elise Mertens (first round)
3. (United States) Coco Gauff / (United States) Jessica Pegula (quarterfinals)
4. (United States) Desirae Krawczyk / (Netherlands) Demi Schuurs (second round, withdrew)
5. (United States) Nicole Melichar-Martinez / (Australia) Ellen Perez (second round)
6. (Canada) Leylah Fernandez / (United States) Taylor Townsend (quarterfinals)
7. (Japan) Shuko Aoyama / (Japan) Ena Shibahara (first round)
8. (Chinese Taipei) Hsieh Su-wei / (China) Wang Xinyu (semifinals)
9. (Chinese Taipei) Chan Hao-ching / (Mexico) Giuliana Olmos (second round)
10. (Ukraine) Lyudmyla Kichenok / (Latvia) Jeļena Ostapenko (second round)
11. (Chinese Taipei) Latisha Chan / (China) Yang Zhaoxuan (second round)
12. (Germany) Laura Siegemund / Vera Zvonareva (final)
13. Veronika Kudermetova / Liudmila Samsonova (second round)
14. (Ukraine) Marta Kostyuk / (Romania) Elena-Gabriela Ruse (third round)
15. (Japan) Miyu Kato / (Indonesia) Aldila Sutjiadi (third round)
16. (Canada) Gabriela Dabrowski / (New Zealand) Erin Routliffe (champions)

Click on the seed number of a player to go to their draw section.

== Draw ==
Key

- Q = Qualifier
- WC = Wild card
- LL = Lucky loser
- Alt = Alternate
- ITF = ITF entry
- PR = Protected ranking
- SR = Special ranking
- SE = Special exempt
- JE = Junior exempt
- JR = Junior Accelerator Programme entrant
- CO = College Accelerator Programme entrant
- NG = Next Gen Accelerator Program entrant
- w/o = Walkover
- r = Retired
- d = Defaulted

=== Finals ===
Quarterfinals
16 | (Canada) Gabriela Dabrowski (New Zealand) Erin Routliffe | 2 | 6 | 7^{10}
6 | (Canada) Leylah Fernandez (United States) Taylor Townsend | 6 | 3 | 6^{8}
3 | (United States) Coco Gauff (United States) Jessica Pegula | 6^{3} | 6 | 4
8 | (Chinese Taipei) Hsieh Su-wei (China) Wang Xinyu | 7^{7} | 3 | 6
12 | (Germany) Laura Siegemund; Vera Zvonareva | 5 | 7 | 6
Victoria Azarenka (Brazil) Beatriz Haddad Maia | 7 | 5 | 4
(Poland) Magda Linette (United States) Bernarda Pera | 6^{1} | 6 | 3
PR | (United States) Jennifer Brady (Brazil) Luisa Stefani | 7^{7} | 3 | 6

Semifinals
16 | (Canada) Gabriela Dabrowski (New Zealand) Erin Routliffe | 6 | 7^{7}
8 | (Chinese Taipei) Hsieh Su-wei (China) Wang Xinyu | 1 | 6^{4}
12 | (Germany) Laura Siegemund; Vera Zvonareva | 6 | 6
PR | (United States) Jennifer Brady (Brazil) Luisa Stefani | 4 | 1

Final
16 | (Canada) Gabriela Dabrowski (New Zealand) Erin Routliffe | 7^{11} | 6
12 | (Germany) Laura Siegemund; Vera Zvonareva | 6^{9} | 3

=== Top half ===
==== Section 1 ====
First round
1 | (Czech Republic) B Krejčíková (Czech Republic) K Siniaková | 6^{5} | 6 | 6
(Japan) M Ninomiya (United States) S Santamaria | 7^{7} | 1 | 4
(Czech Republic) B Strýcová (Czech Republic) M Vondroušová | 6 | 6
(Slovakia) T Mihalíková (China) Y Xu | 4 | 1
(United Kingdom) K Boulter (Kazakhstan) Y Putintseva | 3 | 3
(Chinese Taipei) F-h Wu (China) L Zhu | 6 | 6
(United States) L Davis (Czech Republic) A Dețiuc | 6 | 1 | 0
16 | (Canada) G Dabrowski (New Zealand) E Routliffe | 4 | 6 | 6
11 | (Chinese Taipei) L Chan (China) Z Yang | 6 | 6
A Blinkova (France) V Gracheva | 1 | 1
(Italy) L Bronzetti (Japan) E Hozumi | 4 | 7^{7} | 3
(Czech Republic) Ka Plíšková (Croatia) D Vekić | 6 | 6^{4} | 6
Alt | (Spain) A Bolsova (Spain) R Masarova | 6^{3} | 6 | 7^{10}
(France) A Cornet (Poland) K Piter | 7^{7} | 3 | 6^{7}
WC | (United States) O Center (United States) K Fakih | 0 | 3
6 | (Canada) L Fernandez (United States) T Townsend | 6 | 6

Second round
1 | (Czech Republic) B Krejčíková (Czech Republic) K Siniaková | 2 | 3
(Czech Republic) B Strýcová (Czech Republic) M Vondroušová | 6 | 6
(Chinese Taipei) F-h Wu (China) L Zhu | 3 | 6 | 3
16 | (Canada) G Dabrowski (New Zealand) E Routliffe | 6 | 3 | 6
11 | (Chinese Taipei) L Chan (China) Z Yang | 6 | 5 | 2
(Czech Republic) Ka Plíšková (Croatia) D Vekić | 4 | 7 | 6
Alt | (Spain) A Bolsova (Spain) R Masarova | 2 | 5
6 | (Canada) L Fernandez (United States) T Townsend | 6 | 7

Third round
(Czech Republic) B Strýcová (Czech Republic) M Vondroušová
16 | (Canada) G Dabrowski (New Zealand) E Routliffe | w/o
(Czech Republic) Ka Plíšková (Croatia) D Vekić | 6^{3} | 1
6 | (Canada) L Fernandez (United States) T Townsend | 7^{7} | 6

Quarterfinals
16 | (Canada) G Dabrowski (New Zealand) E Routliffe | 2 | 6 | 7^{10}
6 | (Canada) L Fernandez (United States) T Townsend | 6 | 3 | 6^{8}

==== Section 2 ====
First round
3 | (United States) C Gauff (United States) J Pegula | 6 | 6
WC | (United States) Q Gleason (United States) E Mandlik | 2 | 1
WC | (United States) S Kenin (United States) C Vandeweghe | 6^{7} | 4
(Spain) C Bucșa; A Panova | 7^{9} | 6
PR | I Khromacheva (Australia) D Saville | 6 | 6
WC | (United States) F Crawley (United States) C Tanguilig | 2 | 2
(Romania) I-C Begu (Ukraine) A Kalinina | 5 | 2
14 | (Ukraine) M Kostyuk (Romania) E-G Ruse | 7 | 6
10 | (Ukraine) L Kichenok (Latvia) J Ostapenko | 7 | 4 | 6
(Venezuela) A Gámiz (Spain) S Sorribes Tormo | 5 | 6 | 3
Alt | E Avanesyan; K Rakhimova | 7 | 4 | 6
(France) C Burel (France) D Parry | 5 | 6 | 2
(Brazil) I Gamarra Martins; L Marozava | 6 | 3 | 4
(United States) B Mattek-Sands; A Potapova | 1 | 6 | 6
(Czech Republic) L Fruhvirtová (Colombia) C Osorio | 6 | 5 | 2
8 | (Chinese Taipei) S-w Hsieh (China) Xin Wang | 4 | 7 | 6

Second round
3 | (United States) C Gauff (United States) J Pegula | 6 | 7
(Spain) C Bucșa; A Panova | 1 | 5
PR | I Khromacheva (Australia) D Saville | 2 | 2
14 | (Ukraine) M Kostyuk (Romania) E-G Ruse | 6 | 6
10 | (Ukraine) L Kichenok (Latvia) J Ostapenko | 4 | 6^{4}
Alt | E Avanesyan; K Rakhimova | 6 | 7^{7}
(United States) B Mattek-Sands; A Potapova | 6 | 6^{4} | 5
8 | (Chinese Taipei) S-w Hsieh (China) Xin Wang | 3 | 7^{7} | 7

Third round
3 | (United States) C Gauff (United States) J Pegula | 6 | 6
14 | (Ukraine) M Kostyuk (Romania) E-G Ruse | 4 | 1
Alt | E Avanesyan; K Rakhimova | 0 | 6 | 2
8 | (Chinese Taipei) S-w Hsieh (China) Xin Wang | 6 | 2 | 6

Quarterfinals
3 | (United States) C Gauff (United States) J Pegula | 6^{3} | 6 | 4
8 | (Chinese Taipei) S-w Hsieh (China) Xin Wang | 7^{7} | 3 | 6

=== Bottom half ===
==== Section 3 ====
First round
7 | (Japan) S Aoyama (Japan) E Shibahara | 6^{8} | 6 | 3
WC | (United States) R Montgomery (United States) C Ngounoue | 7^{10} | 3 | 6
WC | (United States) M Jones (United States) J Loeb | 6 | 1 | 0
(Czech Republic) M Kolodziejová (Czech Republic) L Nosková | 4 | 6 | 6
(Belgium) G Minnen (Belgium) Y Wickmayer | 6 | 6
Y Sizikova (Belgium) K Zimmermann | 1 | 2
(United States) C Dolehide (United States) A Muhammad | 5 | 7 | 4
12 | (Germany) L Siegemund; V Zvonareva | 7 | 5 | 6
15 | (Japan) M Kato (Indonesia) A Sutjiadi | 7 | 6
E Alexandrova; A Sasnovich | 5 | 3
(United States) E Navarro (United States) P Stearns | 2 | 4
(Kazakhstan) A Danilina (United Kingdom) H Watson | 6 | 6
V Azarenka (Brazil) B Haddad Maia | 6 | 6
(Hungary) T Babos (Hungary) A Bondár | 3 | 0
(Georgia (country)) O Kalashnikova; I Shymanovich | 4 | 3
4 | (United States) D Krawczyk (Netherlands) D Schuurs | 6 | 6

Second round
WC | (United States) R Montgomery (United States) C Ngounoue | 6 | 6
(Czech Republic) M Kolodziejová (Czech Republic) L Nosková | 3 | 2
(Belgium) G Minnen (Belgium) Y Wickmayer | 7^{7} | 2 | 0
12 | (Germany) L Siegemund; V Zvonareva | 6^{3} | 6 | 6
15 | (Japan) M Kato (Indonesia) A Sutjiadi | 6 | 6
(Kazakhstan) A Danilina (United Kingdom) H Watson | 3 | 1
V Azarenka (Brazil) B Haddad Maia | w/o
4 | (United States) D Krawczyk (Netherlands) D Schuurs

Third round
WC | (United States) R Montgomery (United States) C Ngounoue | 4 | 4
12 | (Germany) L Siegemund; V Zvonareva | 6 | 6
15 | (Japan) M Kato (Indonesia) A Sutjiadi | 2 | 0
V Azarenka (Brazil) B Haddad Maia | 6 | 6

Quarterfinals
12 | (Germany) L Siegemund; V Zvonareva | 5 | 7 | 6
V Azarenka (Brazil) B Haddad Maia | 7 | 5 | 4

==== Section 4 ====
First round
5 | (United States) N Melichar-Martinez (Australia) E Perez | 6 | 6
(Argentina) N Podoroska (Egypt) M Sherif | 1 | 2
(Italy) E Cocciaretto (Italy) M Trevisan | 6 | 5 | 0
(Poland) M Linette (United States) B Pera | 2 | 7 | 6
(United States) S Chang (United States) A Parks | 6 | 6
(Chile) A Guarachi (Romania) M Niculescu | 3 | 4
(Norway) U Eikeri (Estonia) I Neel | 5 | 1
9 | (Chinese Taipei) H-c Chan (Mexico) G Olmos | 7 | 6
13 | V Kudermetova; L Samsonova | 7^{11} | 6
(Italy) J Paolini (China) Xiy Wang | 6^{9} | 1
PR | A Kalinskaya; A Pavlyuchenkova | 1 | 4
PR | (United States) J Brady (Brazil) L Stefani | 6 | 6
(Germany) T Maria (Netherlands) A Rus | 6^{6} | 6 | 7^{10}
WC | (United States) A Krueger (United States) A Kulikov | 7^{8} | 3 | 6^{3}
(United States) D Collins (Ukraine) N Kichenok | 6 | 6
2 | (Australia) S Hunter (Belgium) E Mertens | 4 | 3

Second round
5 | (United States) N Melichar-Martinez (Australia) E Perez | 3 | 6^{5}
(Poland) M Linette (United States) B Pera | 6 | 7^{7}
(United States) S Chang (United States) A Parks | 6 | 4 | 6
9 | (Chinese Taipei) H-c Chan (Mexico) G Olmos | 4 | 6 | 3
13 | V Kudermetova; L Samsonova | 6^{6} | 7 | 4
PR | (United States) J Brady (Brazil) L Stefani | 7^{8} | 5 | 6
(Germany) T Maria (Netherlands) A Rus | 6 | 3 | 7
(United States) D Collins (Ukraine) N Kichenok | 4 | 6 | 5

Third round
(Poland) M Linette (United States) B Pera | 7^{7} | 6
(United States) S Chang (United States) A Parks | 6^{4} | 2
PR | (United States) J Brady (Brazil) L Stefani | 6 | 3 | 6
(Germany) T Maria (Netherlands) A Rus | 3 | 6 | 3

Quarterfinals
(Poland) M Linette (United States) B Pera | 6^{1} | 6 | 3
PR | (United States) J Brady (Brazil) L Stefani | 7^{7} | 3 | 6

== Seeded teams ==
The following are the seeded teams. Seedings are based on WTA rankings as of 21 August 2023.

| Country | Player | Country | Player | Rank | Seed |
|---|---|---|---|---|---|
| CZE | Barbora Krejčíková | CZE | Kateřina Siniaková | 3 | 1 |
| AUS | Storm Hunter | BEL | Elise Mertens | 7 | 2 |
| USA | Coco Gauff | USA | Jessica Pegula | 12 | 3 |
| USA | Desirae Krawczyk | NED | Demi Schuurs | 18 | 4 |
| USA | Nicole Melichar-Martinez | AUS | Ellen Perez | 23 | 5 |
| CAN | Leylah Fernandez | USA | Taylor Townsend | 25 | 6 |
| JPN | Shuko Aoyama | JPN | Ena Shibahara | 28 | 7 |
| TPE | Hsieh Su-wei | CHN | Wang Xinyu | 34 | 8 |
| TPE | Chan Hao-ching | MEX | Giuliana Olmos | 39 | 9 |
| UKR | Lyudmyla Kichenok | LAT | Jeļena Ostapenko | 50 | 10 |
| TPE | Latisha Chan | CHN | Yang Zhaoxuan | 55 | 11 |
| GER | Laura Siegemund | | Vera Zvonareva | 61 | 12 |
| | Veronika Kudermetova | | Liudmila Samsonova | 66 | 13 |
| UKR | Marta Kostyuk | ROU | Elena-Gabriela Ruse | 66 | 14 |
| JPN | Miyu Kato | INA | Aldila Sutjiadi | 70 | 15 |
| CAN | Gabriela Dabrowski | NZL | Erin Routliffe | 73 | 16 |

== Other entry information ==
=== Wildcards ===
- (United States) Olivia Center / (United States) Kate Fakih
- (United States) Fiona Crawley / (United States) Carson Tanguilig
- (United States) Quinn Gleason / (United States) Elizabeth Mandlik
- (United States) Makenna Jones / (United States) Jamie Loeb
- (United States) Sofia Kenin / (United States) CoCo Vandeweghe
- (United States) Ashlyn Krueger / (United States) Angela Kulikov
- (United States) Robin Montgomery / (United States) Clervie Ngounoue

=== Protected ranking ===
- (United States) Jennifer Brady / (Brazil) Luisa Stefani
- Anna Kalinskaya / Anastasia Pavlyuchenkova
- Irina Khromacheva / (Australia) Daria Saville

=== Alternates ===
- Elina Avanesyan / Kamilla Rakhimova
- (Spain) Aliona Bolsova / (Spain) Rebeka Masarova

=== Withdrawals ===
- (Czech Republic) Marie Bouzková / (Spain) Sara Sorribes Tormo → replaced by (Venezuela) Andrea Gámiz / (Spain) Sara Sorribes Tormo
- (France) Caroline Garcia / (France) Kristina Mladenovic → replaced by (Spain) Aliona Bolsova / (Spain) Rebeka Masarova
- (Austria) Julia Grabher / (Sweden) Rebecca Peterson → replaced by Elina Avanesyan / Kamilla Rakhimova
