= Olivia Center =

American tennis player (born 2006)

- Country (sports): United States
- Born: March 18, 2006 (age 19)
- Prize money: S$13,603

Singles
- Career record: 12–13

Grand Slam singles results
- US Open Junior: 2R (2023)

Doubles
- Career record: 8–7
- Highest ranking: No. 1068 (22 July 2024)
- Current ranking: No. 1318 (14 July 2025)

Grand Slam doubles results
- US Open: 1R (2023)
- US Open Junior: 2R (2023)
- Last updated on: 14 July 2025.

Olivia Center (born March 18, 2006) is an American tennis player.

== Early life ==
From South Pasadena, California, Center started playing tennis at the age of six. She attended San Marino High School.

== Career ==
She made her Grand Slam main draw debut at the 2023 US Open. She received a wildcard into the women's doubles main draw with Kate Fakih after winning the USTA National Tennis Championship girls' doubles. In the first round they were defeated by Taylor Townsend and Leylah Fernandez in straight sets.

== ITF Circuit finals ==
=== Doubles: 1 (runner–up) ===
Legend W15 tournaments (0–1)	Finals by surface Hard (0–1)

Result	W–L	Date	Tournament	Tier	Surface	Partner	Opponents	Score
Loss	0–1	Jun 2025	ITF Los Angeles, United States	W15	Hard	(United States) Sophia Webster	(United States) Kylie Collins (Ukraine) Anita Sahdiieva	3–6, 1–6
