= Kate Fakih =

American tennis player (born 2006)

- Country (sports): United States
- Born: 30 October 2006 (age 19)
- Plays: Right-handed
- Prize money: $18,806

Singles
- Career record: 22–15
- Highest ranking: No. 751 (24 February 2025)
- Current ranking: No. 821 (November 11, 2024)

Grand Slam singles results
- Australian Open Junior: 2R (2024)
- US Open Junior: 1R (2024)

Doubles
- Career record: 6–7
- Highest ranking: No. 994 (August 12, 2024)
- Current ranking: No. 1198 (November 11, 2024)

Grand Slam doubles results
- US Open: 1R (2023)
- Australian Open Junior: 1R (2024)
- French Open Junior: 2R (2024)
- US Open Junior: 2R (2023, 2024)
- Last updated on: November 11, 2024.

Kate Fakih (born 30 October 2006) is an American/Kazakh tennis player.

== Early life ==
From Pasadena, California, Fakih has committed to attending UCLA.

== Career ==
She made her Grand Slam main draw debut at the 2023 US Open. She received a wildcard into the women's doubles main draw with Olivia Center after winning the girls' doubles at the USTA Junior National Tennis Championship In the first round they were defeated by Taylor Townsend and Leylah Fernandez in straight sets.
