= Mary Stoiana =

American tennis player (born 2003)

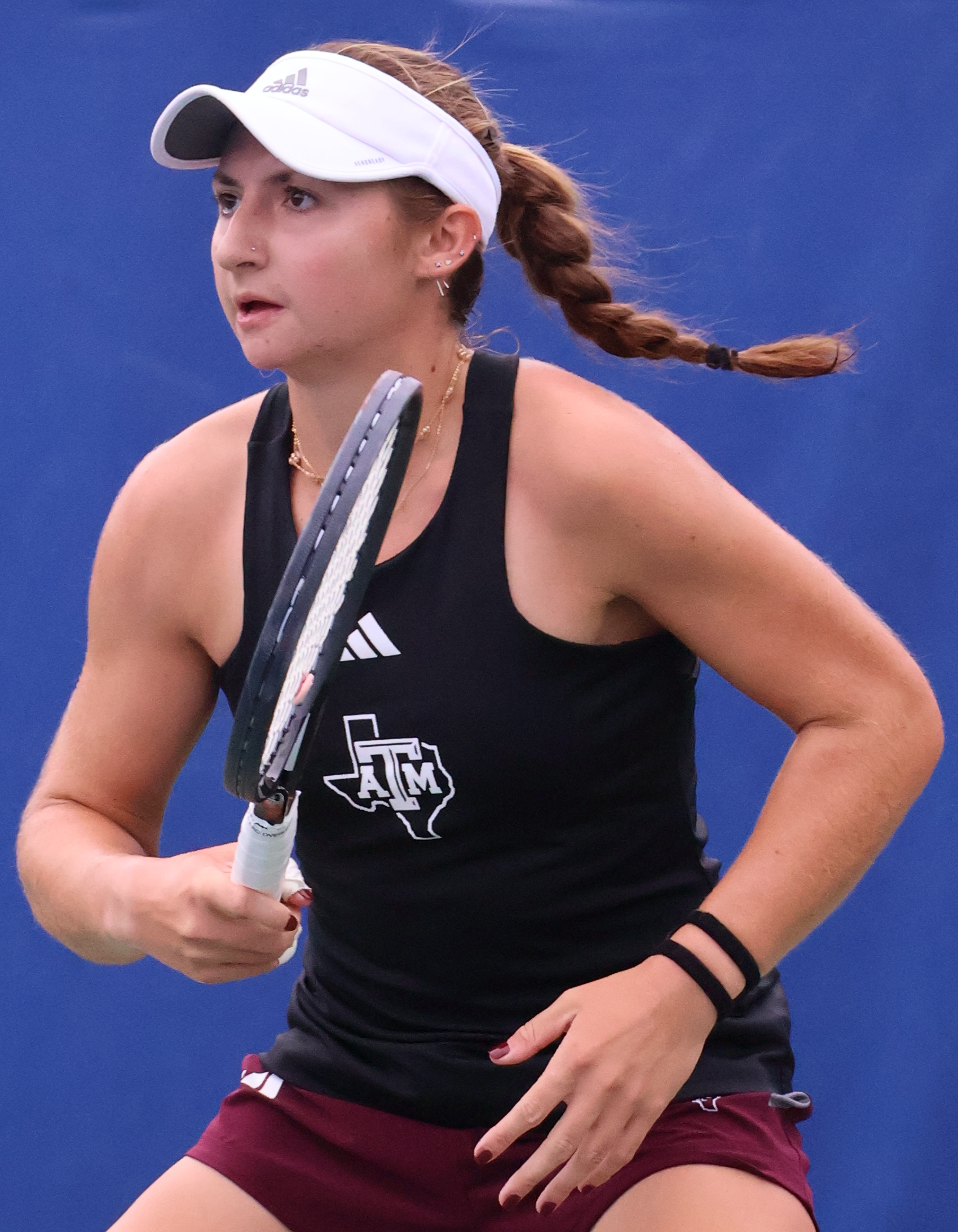
- Stoiana in 2023
- Country (sports): United States
- Born: May 6, 2003 (age 23) Southbury, Connecticut, US
- Height: 5 ft 6 in (168 cm)
- Plays: Right-handed (two-handed backhand)
- College: Texas A&M (2021–2025)
- Prize money: $573,146

Singles
- Career record: 105–59
- Career titles: 3 ITF
- Highest ranking: No. 113 (26 October 2026)
- Current ranking: No. 113 (26 October 2026)

Grand Slam singles results
- Australian Open: Q2 (2026)
- French Open: Q3 (2026)
- Wimbledon: Q2 (2026)
- US Open: 1R (2026)

Doubles
- Career record: 21–9
- Career titles: 1 ITF
- Highest ranking: No. 243 (12 October 2026)
- Current ranking: No. 277 (26 October 2026)
- Last updated on: 26 October 2026.

Mary Stoiana (born May 6, 2003) is an American professional tennis player. She played college tennis for the Texas A&M Aggies and led the team to their first national championship in 2024.

She has won three singles titles and one doubles title on the ITF World Tour.

== Early life ==
Stoiana was born in Southbury, Connecticut to Val Stoiana and Kathleen Morrone. Stoiana's father immigrated from Romania as a child, played college tennis at St. John's University, winning a Big East doubles title in 1986, and later began a coaching career. She began playing tennis at age four, learning from her father as he taught her older brother. She competed in United States Tennis Association (USTA) Junior Sections from age nine.

She attracted notice from Texas A&M coaches with her seventh-place finish at the USTA Girls' 18 National Clay Court Championships in July 2019. Until that summer, she attended Pomperaug High School, when she began being homeschooled to dedicate more time to tennis. She committed to A&M in September 2020. Babolat ranked her as the No. 5 recruit of the class of 2021.

== Collegiate tennis ==
Stoiana began playing college tennis for A&M in 2021. She played most of her first year in the team's No. 3 spot in singles, compiling 34 wins and four losses. She clinched the dual matches that gave A&M the Southeastern Conference (SEC) regular season title and SEC Championship. In doubles, she went 28–5 partnering mostly with junior Carson Branstine. She was named to the All-SEC second team and the SEC All-Freshman team. A&M reached the quarterfinals of the NCAA Championships.

Playing in A&M's No. 1 spot as a sophomore, Stoiana went 38–6, with a doubles record of 28–4. She helped A&M defend its SEC regular season title, receiving SEC Player of the Week honors a record seven times, and was selected to the All-SEC first team and named SEC Player of the Year. She beat national No. 3 Lea Ma in A&M's loss to Georgia in the SEC Championship. Second-seeded A&M again lost in the NCAA Championships quarterfinals. She ended the season nationally ranked No. 2 in singles and doubles.

Stoiana was selected to the USTA Collegiate Summer Team in the summer of 2023. At a W15 event in Lakewood, California in July, she partnered No. 1 college player Fiona Crawley of North Carolina and won the doubles title, and she reached the singles final but had to retire in the match against Hanna Chang. She received a wildcard into the qualifying tournament of the 2023 US Open.

Stoiana won the ITA All-American Championships in Cary, North Carolina, in the fall of her junior year and earned the national No. 1 ranking in singles for the first time, becoming the first Aggie to do so. She went 38–4 overall in singles and received multiple honors in 2024, including SEC Player of the Year again, ITA National Player of the Year, and the Honda Sports Award for the top college player. She led the Aggies to win their first NCAA Championship, being named the Most Valuable Player of the tournament. She was an All-American in singles and doubles, reaching the singles semifinals and the doubles quarterfinals at the NCAA tournament.

== Career ==
=== 2018-2021: Juniors ===
She played on the ITF Junior Circuit from 2018 to 2021, winning three singles titles and one doubles title.

=== 2026: Major & WTA 250 debuts, first WTA Tour match wins & quarterfinal ===
On her sixth attempt, Stoiana recorded her first WTA Tour main-draw wins at the 2026 SP Open over Claire Liu, her fourth career top-100 win, and Dominika Šalková.

== Performance timeline ==
Key
W	F	SF	QF	#R	RR	Q#	DNQ	A	NH

(W) winner; (F) finalist; (SF) semifinalist; (QF) quarterfinalist; (#R) rounds 4, 3, 2, 1; (RR) round-robin stage; (Q#) qualification round; (DNQ) did not qualify; (A) absent; (NH) not held; (SR) strike rate (events won / competed); (W–L) win–loss record.
To avoid confusion and double counting, these charts are updated at the conclusion of a tournament or when the player's participation has ended.

Only main-draw results in WTA Tour, Grand Slam tournaments, Fed Cup/Billie Jean King Cup, Hopman Cup, United Cup and Olympic Games are included in win–loss records.

=== Singles ===
Tournament	2026	SR	W–L
Grand Slam tournaments
Australian Open	Q2	0 / 0	0–0
French Open	Q3	0 / 0	0–0
Wimbledon	Q2	0 / 0	0–0
US Open	1R	0 / 1	0–1
Win–Loss	0–1	0 / 1	0–1
WTA 1000
Cincinnati Open	1R	0 / 1	0–1

== WTA 125 finals ==
=== Doubles: 1 (runner-up) ===
Result	Date	Tournament	Surface	Partner	Opponents	Score
Loss	Feb 2026	Midland Tennis Classic, United States	Hard (i)	(United States) Alana Smith	(United States) Sabrina Santamaria (China) Tang Qianhui	walkover

== ITF Circuit finals ==
=== Singles: 7 (3 titles, 4 runner-ups) ===
Legend W100 tournaments (0–1) W75 tournaments (1–1) W50 tournaments (1–0) W35 tournaments (0–1) W15 tournaments (0–1)	Finals by surface Hard (3–3) Clay (0–1)

Result	W–L	Date	Tournament	Tier	Surface	Opponent	Score
Loss	0–1	Jul 2023	ITF Lakewood, United States	W15	Hard	(United States) Hanna Chang	1–1 ret.
Loss	0–2	Jul 2024	Evansville Classic, US	W75	Hard	(United States) Sophie Chang	6–4, 6–7^{(5)}, 3–6
Win	1–2	Oct 2024	Edmond Open, US	W75	Hard	(United States) Alana Smith	7–5, 6–3
Loss	1–3	Oct 2025	Tyler Pro Challenge, US	W100	Hard	(Croatia) Petra Marčinko	3–6, 0–6
Win	2–3	Nov 2025	ITF Austin, US	W50	Hard	(Japan) Mai Hontama	2–6, 6–3, 6–4
Win	3–3	Nov 2025	ITF Chihuahua, Mexico	W50	Hard	(Canada) Kayla Cross	7–6^{(2)}, 6–7^{(6)}, 6–2
Loss	3–4	Apr 2026	ITF Boca Raton, US	W35	Clay	(United States) Kayla Day	3–6, 1–6

=== Doubles: 1 (title) ===
Legend W15 tournaments (1–0)	Finals by surface Hard (1–0)

Result	W–L	Date	Tournament	Tier	Surface	Partner	Opponents	Score
Win	1–0	Jul 2023	ITF Lakewood, United States	W15	Hard	(United States) Fiona Crawley	(United States) Mary Lewis (United States) Brandy Walker	7–5, 6–7^{(3)}, [10–5]
