= Tian Fangran =

Chinese tennis player (born 2003)

Tian Fangran 田方然
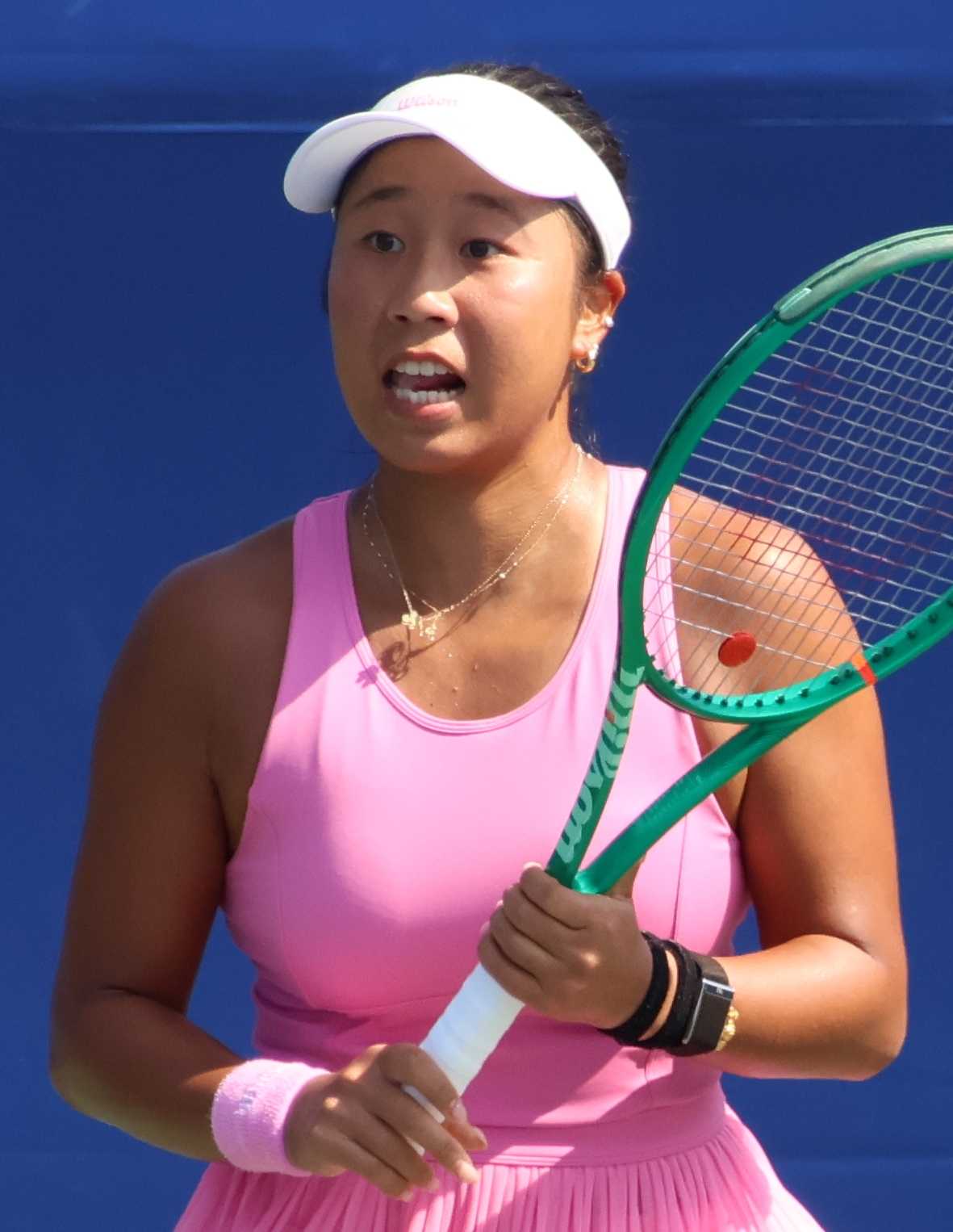
- Tian in 2026
- Country (sports): China
- Born: 10 August 2003 (age 23) Beijing, China
- Height: 5 ft 5 in (165 cm)
- Plays: Right (two-handed backhand)
- College: UCLA (2023–)
- Coach: Mangal Sriram
- Prize money: $117,448

Singles
- Career record: 145–66
- Career titles: 4 ITF
- Highest ranking: No. 243 (20 April 2026)
- Current ranking: No. 250 (13 July 2026)

Doubles
- Career record: 57–26
- Career titles: 7 ITF
- Highest ranking: No. 371 (15 July 2024)
- Current ranking: No. 516 (13 July 2026)
- Last updated on: 14 July 2026.

Tian Fangran
- Simplified Chinese: 田方然
Transcriptions

Tian Fangran (born 10 August 2003) is a Chinese tennis player. She played college tennis for the UCLA Bruins, winning the NCAA singles championship in 2023. She has also won four singles titles and seven doubles titles on the ITF Women's World Tennis Tour.

== Tennis career ==
Raised in Beijing, Tian went to high school at Capital Normal University (CNU)'s Yuxin School. She played on the ITF Junior Circuit from 2017 to 2020, winning two Grade 5 singles titles and two Grade 4 doubles titles, and reaching a peak junior ranking of No. 121. She twice won wildcards into junior Grand Slam main draws in singles, at the 2019 French Open and the 2020 Australian Open.

Tian started playing on the ITF World Tour in February 2019 at the age of 15. Over three weeks from October to November 2021, she partnered with Back Da-yeon to win two doubles titles and reach a third final at consecutive W15 events in Antalya, Turkey. She reached the final of the singles draw in one of the weeks in Antalya. In November 2022, she won the W15 singles event in Champaign, Illinois, without dropping a set.

Tian committed to the women's tennis program at the University of California, Los Angeles (UCLA) in 2022. Over the 2022/23 collegiate season, Tian rose from a relatively unheralded recruit to the team's No.1 single's spot. She finished the regular season undefeated with a 15-0 record. She was named the Pac-12 Conference's Freshman/Newcomer of the Year in tennis. Seeded No. 9–16 in singles at the 2023 NCAA Championships, Tian proceeded to win the title, UCLA's first individual title since Keri Phebus in 1995, without conceding a single set. Her run included a semifinal rivalry victory against USC's Maddy Sieg. In the final, Tian beat Oklahoma senior Layne Sleeth 6–4, 6–2. She was named Rookie of the Year by the Intercollegiate Tennis Association (ITA).

In 2023, she received a wildcard from the China Open, losing to Linda Nosková in the first round.

== ITF Circuit finals ==
=== Singles: 7 (4 titles, 3 runner-ups) ===
| Legend W35 tournaments (1–0) W15 tournaments (3–3) | Finals by surface Hard (4–2) Clay (0–1) |

| Result | W–L | Date | Tournament | Tier | Surface | Opponent | Score |
|---|---|---|---|---|---|---|---|
| Loss | 0–1 | Nov 2021 | ITF Antalya, Turkey | W15 | Clay | (Argentina) Julia Riera | 6–7^{(3)}, 1–6 |
| Win | 1–1 | Nov 2022 | ITF Champaign, United States | W15 | Hard | (United States) Sara Daavettila | 6–1, 6–3 |
| Loss | 1–2 | Jun 2023 | Rancho Santa Fe Open, United States | W15 | Hard | (United States) Megan McCray | 1–6, 6–0, 4–6 |
| Win | 2–2 | Jun 2023 | ITF San Diego, United States | W15 | Hard | (United States) Aspen Schuman | 6–1, 6–2 |
| Win | 3–2 | Jun 2023 | ITF Los Angeles, United States | W15 | Hard | (Canada) Jessica Luisa Alsola | 6–2, 6–1 |
| Loss | 3–3 | Jun 2025 | ITF Hong Kong, China | W15 | Hard | (Japan) Ikumi Yamazaki | 4–6, 6–2, 1–6 |
| Win | 4–3 | Oct 2025 | Brisbane QTC International, Australia | W35 | Hard | (United Kingdom) Katie Swan | 2–6, 7–6^{(5)}, 6–1 |

=== Doubles: 13 (7 titles, 6 runner-ups) ===
| Legend W60 tournaments (0–1) W50 tournaments (1–1) W25/35 tournaments (1–1) W15 tournaments (5–3) | Finals by surface Hard (5–5) Clay (2–1) |

| Result | W–L | Date | Tournament | Tier | Surface | Partner | Opponents | Score |
|---|---|---|---|---|---|---|---|---|
| Win | 1–0 | Oct 2021 | ITF Antalya, Turkey | W15 | Clay | (South Korea) Back Da-yeon | (Turkey) Doğa Türkmen (Turkey) Melis Ayda Uyar | 7–6^{(5)}, 6–1 |
| Loss | 1–1 | Nov 2021 | ITF Antalya, Turkey | W15 | Clay | (South Korea) Back Da-yeon | (Russia) Ksenia Laskutova (Russia) Aleksandra Pospelova | 6–2, 2–6, [6–10] |
| Win | 2–1 | Nov 2021 | ITF Antalya, Turkey | W15 | Clay | (South Korea) Back Da-yeon | (Russia) Anna Chekanskaya (Georgia (country)) Zoziya Kardava | 7–5, 6–3 |
| Win | 3–1 | Jun 2023 | ITF San Diego, US | W15 | Hard | (United States) Kimmi Hance | (United States) Malaika Rapolu (Ukraine) Anita Sahdiieva | 3–6, 6–1, [11–9] |
| Win | 4–1 | Jun 2023 | ITF Los Angeles, US | W15 | Hard | (Japan) Rinon Okuwaki | (Mexico) Fernanda Navarro (United States) Brandy Walker | 7–5, 6–3 |
| Loss | 4–2 | Aug 2023 | ITF Valladolid, Spain | W25 | Hard | (United States) Ava Markham | (Australia) Alexandra Bozovic (United Kingdom) Sarah Beth Grey | 5–7, 0–6 |
| Loss | 4–3 | Sep 2023 | Caldas da Rainha Open, Portugal | W60+H | Hard | (United States) Ashley Lahey | (Portugal) Francisca Jorge (Portugal) Matilde Jorge | 1–6, 6–2, [7–10] |
| Win | 5–3 | Jun 2024 | ITF Tauste, Spain | W35+H | Hard | (India) Rutuja Bhosale | (Australia) Alana Parnaby (Mexico) Victoria Rodríguez | 6–2, 6–4 |
| Loss | 5–4 | Jun 2025 | ITF Hong Kong, China | W15 | Hard | (South Korea) Jeong Bo-young | Evgeniya Burdina; Anastasia Grechkina | 2–6, 2–6 |
| Loss | 5–5 | Jun 2025 | ITF Hong Kong | W15 | Hard | (South Korea) Jeong Bo-young | (Hong Kong) Shek Cheuk Ying (China) Zhang Ying | 1–6, 1–6 |
| Win | 6–5 | Jul 2025 | ITF Lu'an, China | W15 | Hard | (United States) Anne Christine Lutkemeyer | (China) Wang Jiayi (China) Zhang Junhan | 4–6, 7–5, [10–3] |
| Loss | 6–6 | Sep 2025 | ITF Guiyang, China | W50 | Hard | (China) Zhang Ying | Varvara Panshina; Daria Zelinskaya | 2–6, 4–6 |
| Win | 7–6 | Jun 2026 | ITF Palma del Río, Spain | W50 | Hard | (India) Rutuja Bhosale | (Australia) Elena Micic (Australia) Belle Thompson | 6–3, 6–4 |
