= Carson Tanguilig =

American tennis player (born 2003)

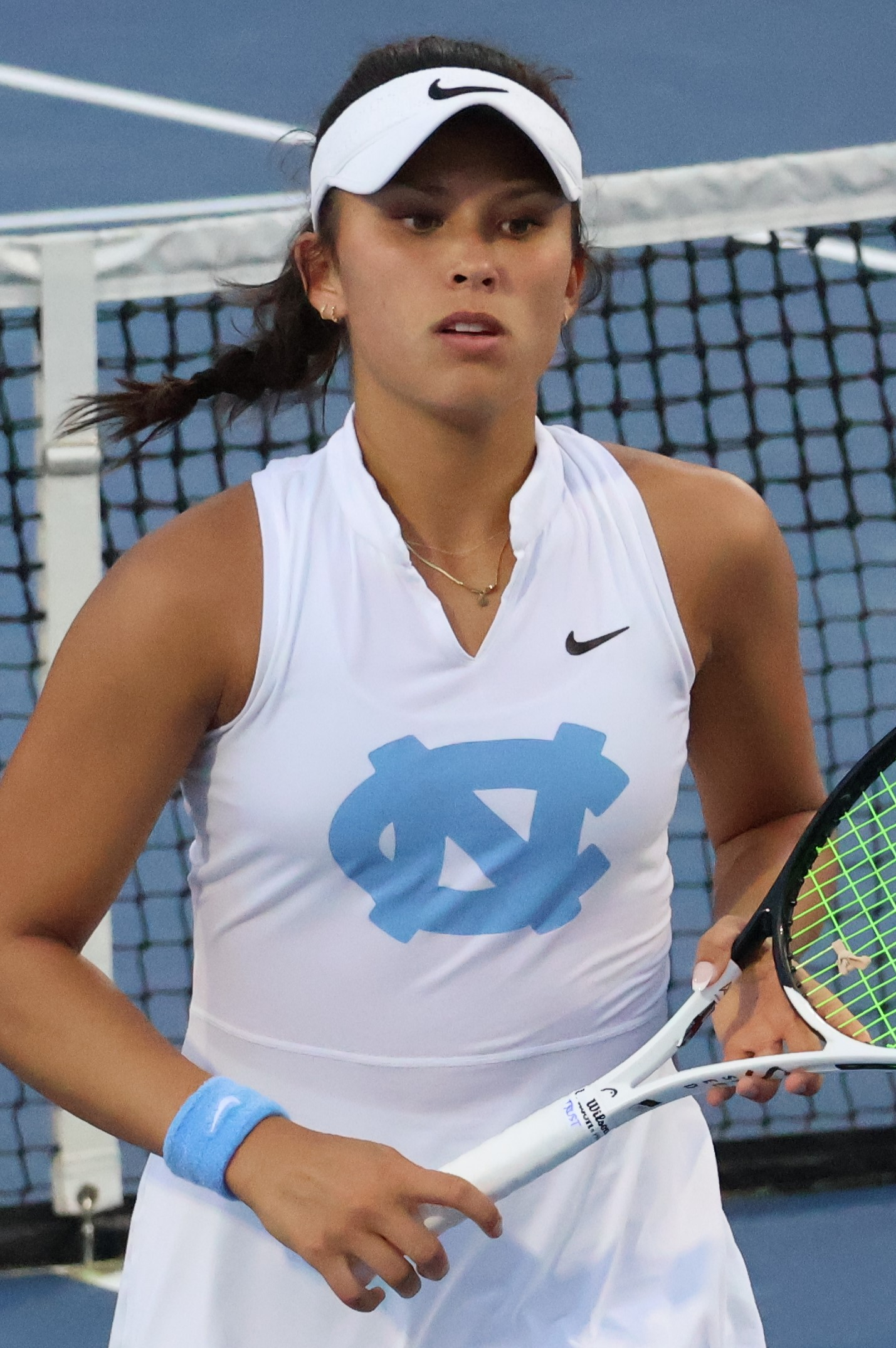
- Tanguilig with North Carolina Tar Heels, 2024
- Country (sports): United States
- Born: July 31, 2003 (age 23) Atlanta, Georgia
- Height: 5 ft 10 in (178 cm)
- Plays: Right-handed
- College: North Carolina (2021–)
- Prize money: $35,078

Singles
- Career record: 46–27
- Career titles: 1 ITF
- Highest ranking: No. 536 (October 26, 2026)
- Current ranking: No. 536 (October 26, 2026)

Doubles
- Career record: 27–21
- Career titles: 4 ITF
- Highest ranking: No. 249 (October 26, 2026)
- Current ranking: No. 249 (October 26, 2026)

Grand Slam doubles results
- US Open: 1R (2023)
- Last updated on: October 29, 2026.

Carson Tanguilig (born July 31, 2003) is an American tennis player. She achieved her career-high doubles ranking of 249 in October 2026.

Tanguilig plays college tennis for the North Carolina Tar Heels, and in 2023, she helped win its first national team championship and won the national doubles title alongside Fiona Crawley.

== Early life ==
Tanguilig grew up in Alpharetta, Georgia. She attended Johns Creek High School, where she went undefeated as a freshman in her only year of high school tennis. In addition to competing at various national junior tennis events, she played basketball as a 5-foot-10-inch (1.78 m) starting guard in high school. On the ITF Junior Circuit, she won four doubles titles from 2016 to 2020 and reached a peak ranking of No. 507.

== Career ==
=== College years ===
In her first year at North Carolina in 2021–22, Tanguilig went 32–7 in singles record and 28–10 in doubles, mostly partnering Cameron Morra. Tanguilig and Morra won a regional Intercollegiate Tennis Association (ITA) tournament in the fall. At the 2022 NCAA Championships, where she helped top-seeded North Carolina reach the team semifinals, she additionally reached the round of 16 in singles and doubles.

The next season, Tanguilig and Fiona Crawley reached the national No. 1 doubles ranking following a regional ITA win and a national runner-up finish in the fall of 2022. In singles, she played mostly in North Carolina's No. 3 spot but was ranked as high as No. 7 nationally. She received second-team All-ACC honors in singles and first-team All-ACC in doubles. At the 2023 NCAA Championships, Tanguilig helped North Carolina win their first national team title, clinching the team's victory in the final with a three-set win over North Carolina State's Amelia Rajecki. She partnered with Elizabeth Scotty during the NCAA team competition but partnered with Crawley in the national doubles tournament, which they went on to win, beating teammates Scotty and Reese Brantmeier in the final.

Tanguilig ended her junior 2024 season ranked No. 6 nationally in doubles with Crawley, receiving first-team All-ACC honors in doubles and third-team All-ACC in singles.

=== Professional debut ===
Tanguilig played in a handful of ITF World Tour qualifying events beginning in 2017. As NCAA champions, Tanguilig and Crawley were awarded a wildcard into the 2023 US Open doubles main draw.

== ITF Circuit finals ==
=== Singles: 3 (1 title, 2 runner-ups) ===
Legend W35 tournaments (0–1) W15 tournaments (1–1)	Finals by surface Clay (1–2)

Result	W–L	Date	Tournament	Tier	Surface	Opponent	Score
Loss	0–1	Oct 2025	ITF Sumter, United States	W15	Clay	(Netherlands) Rose Marie Nijkamp	2–6, 5–7
Win	1–1	Apr 2026	ITF Bonita Springs, United States	W15	Clay	(United States) Ellie Schoppe	7–5, 6–4
Loss	1–2	May 2026	ITF Boca Raton, United States	W35	Clay	(Argentina) Justina María González	4–6, 4–6

=== Doubles: 7 (4 titles, 3 runner-ups) ===
Legend W75 tournaments (1–1) W50 tournaments (0–1) W35 tournaments (0–1) W15 tournaments (3–0)	Finals by surface Hard (2–2) Clay (2–1)

Result	W–L	Date	Tournament	Tier	Surface	Partner	Opponents	Score
Win	1–0	Oct 2025	ITF Sumter, United States	W15	Clay	(United States) Jaedan Brown	(United States) Bella Payne (United States) Sara Shumate	6–2, 4–6, [10–6]
Win	2–0	Nov 2025	ITF Clemson, US	W15	Hard	(United States) Bella Payne	(Slovakia) Romana Čisovská (Spain) Candela Yecora	6–2, 6–2
Loss	2–1	Mar 2026	ITF Jackson, US	W35	Clay	(United States) Kylie Collins	(United States) Kailey Evans (Japan) Mio Mushika	6–7^{(5)}, 6–2, [10–12]
Win	3–1	Apr 2026	ITF Bonita Springs, US	W15	Clay	(United States) Kylie Collins	(United States) Carlota Moreno (United States) Nadia Elle Valdez	6–2, 6–3
Loss	3–2	Sep 2026	ITF Yecla, Spain	W50	Hard	(Latvia) Elza Tomase	(Spain) Georgina García Pérez (Serbia) Elena Milovanović	6–2, 4–6, [10–12]
Loss	3–3	Sep 2026	The Campus Open, Portugal	W75	Hard	(United States) Kylie Collins	(United States) Ayana Akli (United States) Reese Brantmeier	5–7, 4–6
Win	4–3	Oct 2026	Challenger de Saguenay, Canada	W75	Hard (i)	(United States) Reese Brantmeier	(Czech Republic) Michaela Bayerlová (Netherlands) Jasmijn Gimbrère	6–2, 7–6^{(3)}
