= Michigan Wolverines women's tennis =

Sports team

- Founded: 1973
- University: University of Michigan
- Athletic director: Warde Manuel
- Head coach: Ronni Bernstein (18th season)
- Conference: Big Ten
- Location: Ann Arbor, Michigan
- Home Court: University of Michigan Varsity Tennis Center (Capacity: Indoor: 632; Outdoor: 600)
- Nickname: Wolverines
- Colors: Maize and blue

NCAA Tournament Semifinals
- 2025

NCAA Tournament Quarterfinals
- 2016, 2023, 2024, 2025

NCAA Tournament Round of 16
- 1997, 2010, 2011, 2012, 2013, 2015, 2017, 2019, 2021, 2023, 2024, 2025

NCAA Tournament Round of 32
- 1996, 1997, 2003, 2004, 2006, 2007, 2008, 2009, 2010, 2011, 2012, 2013, 2014, 2015, 2016, 2017, 2018, 2019, 2021, 2022, 2023, 2024, 2025

NCAA Tournament appearances
- 1996, 1997, 1998, 2002, 2003 2004, 2005, 2006, 2007, 2008, 2009, 2010, 2011, 2012, 2013, 2014, 2015, 2016, 2017, 2018, 2019, 2021, 2022, 2023, 2024, 2025

Conference Tournament championships
- 1997, 2015, 2018, 2019, 2022, 2023, 2024

Conference regular season champions
- 1997, 2010, 2011, 2012, 2013, 2014, 2015, 2017, 2019, 2021, 2023, 2024, 2025

The Michigan Wolverines women's tennis team represents the University of Michigan in National Collegiate Athletic Association (NCAA) Division I competition. College women's tennis became a varsity sport at the University of Michigan in 1973. Ronni Bernstein has been the head coach since 2007. The team plays its home matches at the University of Michigan Varsity Tennis Center.

== See also ==
- Michigan Wolverines men's tennis
