= Sebastian Korda =

Czech-American tennis player (born 2000)

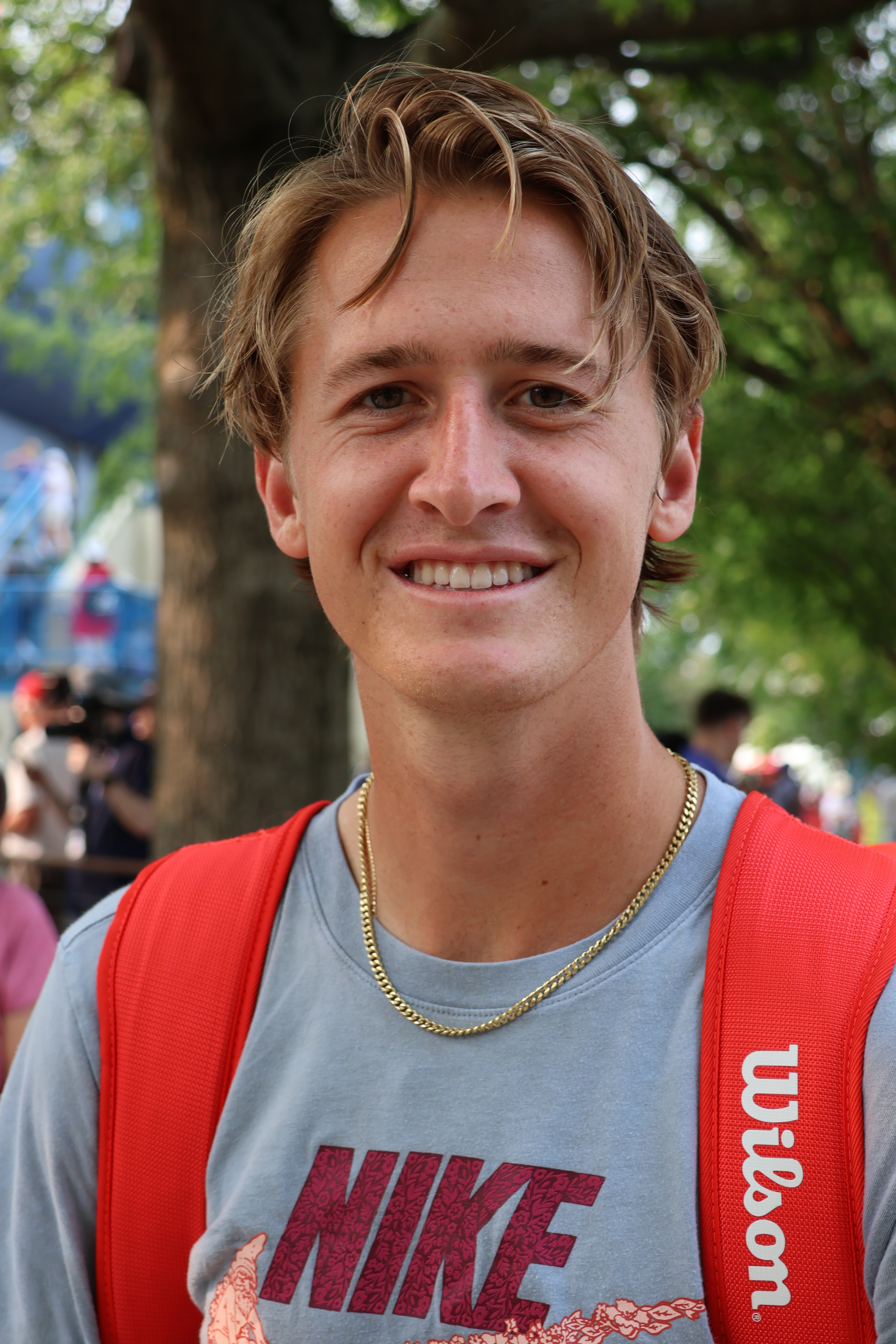
- Korda in 2023
- Country (sports): United States
- Residence: Bradenton, Florida, US
- Born: July 5, 2000 (age 26) Bradenton, Florida, US
- Height: 6 ft 5 in (1.96 m)
- Turned pro: 2018
- Plays: Right-handed (two-handed backhand)
- Coach: Ryan Harrison
- Prize money: US $8,999,774

Singles
- Career record: 159–103
- Career titles: 3
- Highest ranking: No. 15 (August 12, 2024)
- Current ranking: No. 101 (November 9, 2026)

Grand Slam singles results
- Australian Open: QF (2023)
- French Open: 4R (2020)
- Wimbledon: 4R (2021)
- US Open: 2R (2022, 2024)

Doubles
- Career record: 29–27
- Career titles: 1
- Highest ranking: No. 46 (March 31, 2025)
- Current ranking: No. 517 (August 31, 2026)

Team competitions
- Davis Cup: QF (2022, 2024)
- Last updated on: August 31, 2026.

Sebastian Korda (/ˈkɔːrdə/ KORD-ə; born July 5, 2000) is an American professional tennis player. He has a career-high ATP singles ranking of world No. 15, achieved on August 12, 2024, and a best doubles ranking of No. 46, reached on March 31, 2025. He has won four ATP Tour titles combined, three in singles and one in doubles.

== Early life and background ==
Korda was born in Bradenton, United States, to two Czech former tennis players, men's world No. 2 Petr Korda and women's No. 26 Regina Rajchrtová. His father was an Australian Open champion and French Open finalist in both singles and doubles.

Korda started taking tennis lessons in his late childhood and rapidly took part in junior tournaments.

== Junior career ==
Korda had good results on the ITF junior circuit. He won the boys' singles title at the 2018 Australian Open. This result came 20 years after his father, Petr, was crowned champion on men's singles category in Melbourne.

He reached an ITF junior combined ranking of world No. 1 on 29 January 2018.

== Professional career ==
=== 2018: ATP Tour debut ===
Korda made his ATP main draw debut at the New York Open. As a wildcard entry, he lost in the first round to Frances Tiafoe in three sets.

=== 2020: Major debut and fourth round ===
Korda made his Masters 1000 debut as a qualifier at the warm-up Western & Southern Open tournament prior to the US Open. Korda made his Grand Slam debut as a wildcard at the US Open where he was defeated by Denis Shapovalov.

As a qualifier, Korda reached the fourth round at the French Open after beating Andreas Seppi, 21st seed John Isner and fellow qualifier Pedro Martínez. He lost to defending (and eventual) champion Rafael Nadal in straight sets.

=== 2021: ATP title, Wimbledon fourth round ===
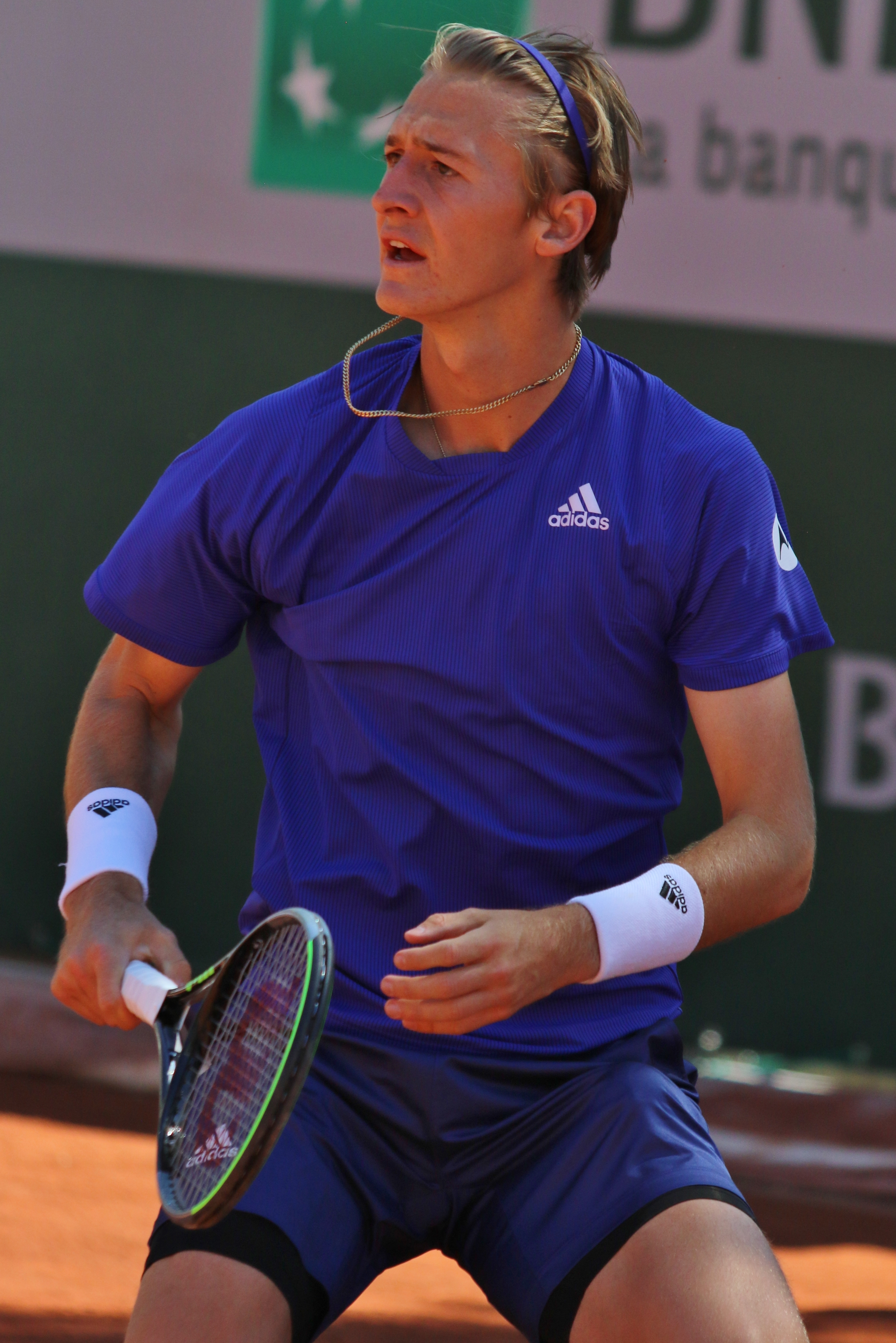
Korda at the 2021 French Open

Korda reached his first ATP final at the Delray Beach Open defeating Cameron Norrie. He lost to Hubert Hurkacz in straight sets.

Korda made another breakthrough run at the Miami Masters, where he reached his first Masters 1000 quarterfinal. He beat 10th seed Fabio Fognini in three sets, 17th seed Aslan Karatsev in straight sets and scored his first top 10 win against Diego Schwartzman in three sets. He lost to 4th seed Andrey Rublev in the quarterfinals. He also reached a then career-high ranking of ATP world No. 62 on April 12, 2021.

In May, Korda lifted his first career ATP Tour singles title at the Emilia-Romagna Open, an ATP 250 tournament first played in 2021 due to the one-week delay of the 2021 French Open. He beat Marco Cecchinato in the final and did not drop a set throughout the tournament. He also became the first American male tennis player to win on European clay since Sam Querrey in 2010. As a result of this successful run, he reached a new then career-high of No. 50 on May 31, 2021.

In June at the Halle Open, his first ever ATP event on grass, Korda picked up his second top 10 win against 6th seed Roberto Bautista Agut| along with beating Kei Nishikori en route to the quarterfinals, where he lost to eventual champion Ugo Humbert.

A week later, in his debut at Wimbledon, Korda reached the fourth round for the first time in his career after defeating in-form player and 15th seed Alex de Minaur, qualifier Antoine Hoang, and 22nd seed Dan Evans. However, he lost in the fourth round to 25th seed Karen Khachanov in five tight sets with the score in the fifth set being 10–8 after thirteen breaks of serve. Despite the loss, he reached a new career-high ranking of No. 46 on July 12, 2021.

At the Paris Masters, Korda defeated 13th seed Aslan Karatsev and former world No. 3 Marin Čilić. The win over Karatsev ended the Russian's push to qualify for the season-ending ATP Finals.

=== 2022: Australian Open third round, top 30 ===
Korda started his 2022 season by playing at the Australian Open. In his debut, he upset world No. 12, Cameron Norrie, in the first round for his first victory at this event. He went on to defeat Corentin Moutet in the second round in a tight five-set match with a super tiebreak in the fifth set to reach the third round for the first time at this Major. In the third round, he lost to 19th seed and world No. 21, Pablo Carreño Busta.

Seeded fifth at the Delray Beach Open, Korda reached the quarterfinals where he was defeated by top seed and eventual champion, Cameron Norrie. In Acapulco, he was beaten in the first round by Dušan Lajović. Representing the USA during the Davis Cup tie against Colombia, he beat Nicolás Mejía in his debut. In the end, the USA won the tie over Colombia 4–0 to advance to the Davis Cup Finals. In March, he competed at the BNP Paribas Open. He defeated qualifier Thanasi Kokkinakis in the first round. In the second round, he faced fourth seed, former world No. 1, and three-time champion, Rafael Nadal. Despite serving a breadstick in the second set and leading 5–2 in the final set, he lost to the eventual finalist in a third-set tiebreak. At the Miami Open, he was knocked out of the tournament in the third round by Miomir Kecmanović.

Korda started his clay court season at the Monte-Carlo Masters. He upset eighth seed, world No. 11, and recent Miami Open champion, Carlos Alcaraz, in the second round for the biggest win of his season; he gained revenge for his defeat to Alcaraz at the Next Generation ATP Finals. He lost in the third round to 10th seed, world No. 13, and compatriot, Taylor Fritz. In Barcelona, he fell in the first round to Spanish qualifier Carlos Taberner. Seeded eighth at the Estoril Open, he stunned top seed and world No. 10, Félix Auger-Aliassime, in the quarterfinals avenging a 2021 Acapulco loss, for his third top-10 win.

At the 2022 US Open, he reached the second round for the first time at this Major after defeating Facundo Bagnis before losing in a five sets, all-American clash with Tommy Paul.

At the 2022 Gijón Open he reached the third final of his career defeating en route third seed Roberto Bautista Agut, Andy Murray in the quarterfinals and Arthur Rinderknech in the semifinals. He lost to top seed Andrey Rublev in straight sets. He followed it by a fourth final at the 2022 European Open in Antwerp defeating Dominic Thiem before losing to second seed Félix Auger-Aliassime.

=== 2023: Two ATP finals, top 25 ===
Korda started his 2023 season at the Adelaide International 1. He reached his fifth ATP singles final by beating former world No. 1 Andy Murray, world No. 21 Roberto Bautista Agut, sixth seed and world No. 15, Jannik Sinner, and Yoshihito Nishioka via retirement. In the final, he lost to top seed and world No. 5, Novak Djokovic, in three sets despite having a championship point. Seeded 29th at the Australian Open, he stunned seventh seed, world No. 8, and two-time finalist, Daniil Medvedev, in the third round. In the fourth round, he beat 10th seed and world No. 11, Hubert Hurkacz, to reach the quarterfinals of a Major for the first time in his career. He retired during his quarterfinal match against 18th seed and world No. 20, Karen Khachanov, due to a right-wrist injury. Due to his success at the Australian Open, his ranking improved from No. 31 to No. 26.

Korda's right-wrist injury kept him out of action for the next few months. He returned to the tour during the week of April 24 at the Madrid Open. Seeded 22nd, he lost in the second round to French qualifier Hugo Grenier. Seeded 22nd at the Italian Open, he was defeated in the second round by qualifier Roman Safiullin. He also lost in the second round at the 2023 French Open to another qualifier, Austrian Sebastian Ofner.

At the 2023 Queen's Club Championships he reached the semifinals without dropping a set, defeating Dan Evans, fourth seed Frances Tiafoe and fifth seed Cameron Norrie.

Following this good run, he lost in the first round at the 2023 Wimbledon Championships to Jiří Veselý who was using protected ranking.

He also lost in the first round to Márton Fucsovics at the US Open. Starting the Asian swing at the 2023 Zhuhai Championships he defeated Alexandre Müller and fifth seed Tomás Martín Etcheverry to reach another semifinal. The following week he reached his sixth final at the 2023 Astana Open defeating wildcard Hamad Medjedovic before losing to sixth seed Adrian Mannarino. At the Shanghai Masters he defeated second seed Daniil Medvedev, his second win of the season against the Russian, and first top-5 and top-3 win of his career to reach the fourth round. Next he defeated 20th seed Francisco Cerúndolo to reach the quarterfinals. He reached his first Masters semifinal defeating compatriot Ben Shelton.

=== 2024: Masters doubles title, top 20 in singles ===
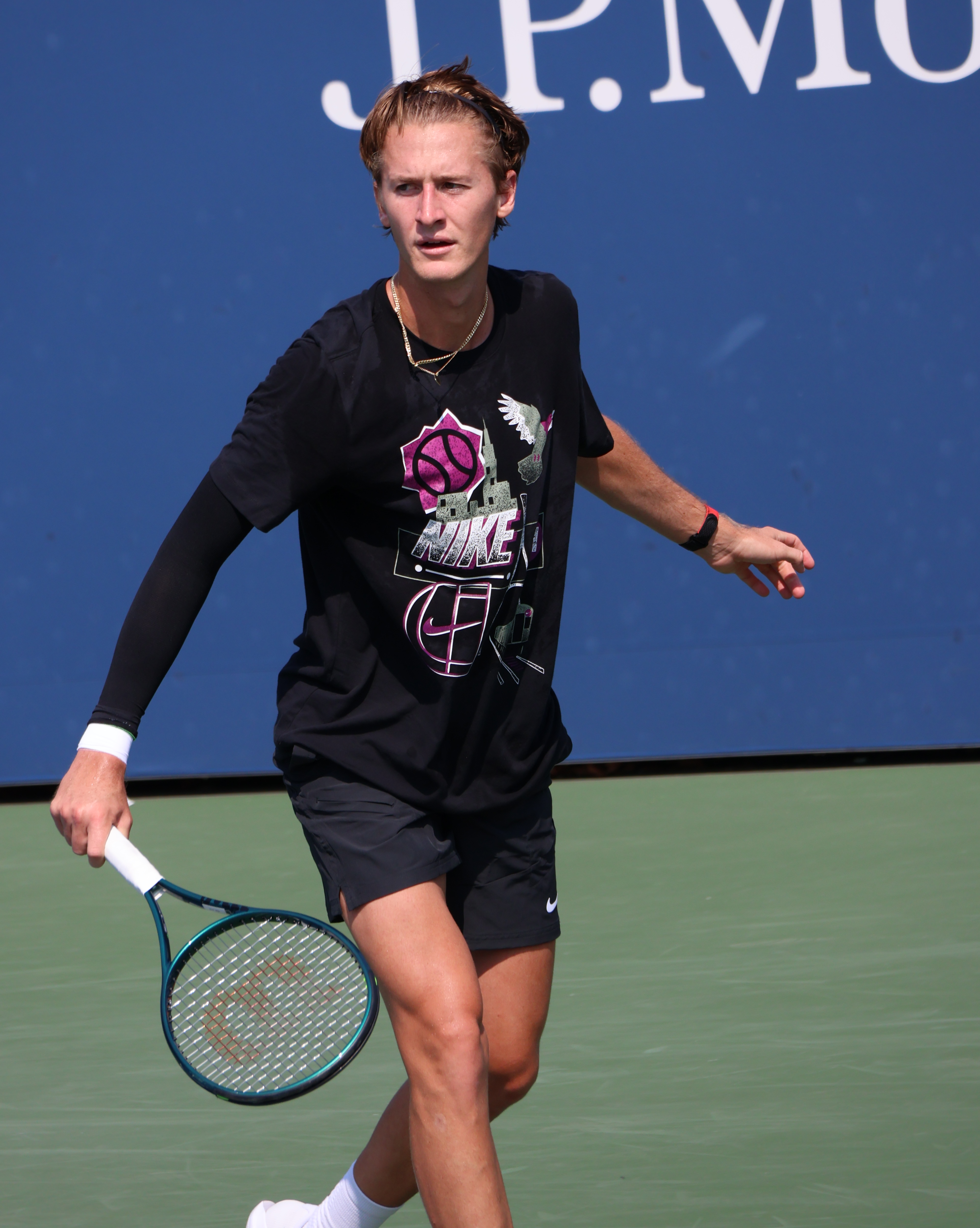
Korda at the 2024 US Open

He recorded his 100th win at the 2024 Open 13 Provence over qualifier Hugo Grenier. He lost to second seed Grigor Dimitrov in the second round.

At the 2024 Mutua Madrid Open, Korda won the men's doubles title with Australian Jordan Thompson. It was Korda's first ATP level doubles title.

At the beginning of the grass court season at the 2024 Libéma Open in 's-Hertogenbosch he reached his seventh final, becoming the first American in the championship match since 1996. He lost to top seed Alex de Minaur in straight sets. At the 2024 Queen's Club Championships he defeated Karen Khachanov, and third seed Grigor Dimitrov in three sets, to reach back-to-back grass court quarterfinals. Following reaching the semifinals with a win over qualifier Rinky Hijikata also in three sets, he reached the top 20 in the rankings. Korda and his father Petr became the first father/son duo to rank in the Top 20.

Korda won his second ATP single title and the first 500 title at the Washington Open. Korda defeated 5th seed Frances Tiafoe in the semifinal and 7th seed Jordan Thompson in the quarterfinals. In the final match, Korda beat Flavio Cobolli in three sets, to win the title 32 years after his father Petr Korda. They became the first father-son tandem to win the same ATP Tour event.

Korda reached the semifinals of a Masters 1000 for the first time in his career, at the 2024 National Bank Open, Canada, defeating wildcard entrant and local player Vasek Pospisil by retirement and upsetting ninth seed Taylor Fritz, sixth seed Casper Ruud with a walkover and second seed Alexander Zverev, his second career top 5 win. As a result he reached the top 15 in the rankings.

=== 2025: ATP final, injury ===
Korda reached the final at the 2025 Adelaide International, losing to fifth seed Félix Auger-Aliassime in three sets.

Following a two-and-a-half-month recovery from a stress fracture in his right shin—and after dropping to world No. 86 and missing Wimbledon, he returned in August at the 2025 Winston-Salem Open where he made it to the semifinal but withdrew before the match due to illness. The following week he retired early during his first round match against Cameron Norrie at the 2025 US Open.

=== 2026: ATP title, win over World No. 1 ===
Korda defeated Tommy Paul at the 2026 Delray Beach Open to win his third ATP title.

At the 2026 Miami Open Korda defeated top seed and world No. 1 Carlos Alcaraz to reach the fourth round.

== Personal life ==
Born in 2000 in Bradenton, Florida, he comes from a family of Czech tennis players. His father, Petr Korda, rose to world No. 2 after winning the 1998 Australian Open. His mother, Regina Rajchrtová, was ranked inside the top 30 of the WTA rankings. His older sisters are professional LPGA Tour golfers, Nelly Korda, an Olympic gold medalist, and Jessica Korda. He is fluent in both Czech and English.

Korda started playing ice hockey as a child, but decided to switch to tennis at the age of 9 after accompanying his father to his performance at the 2009 US Open. Among his mentors in tennis development were Andre Agassi and Steffi Graf, under whose guidance he trained. He also worked with Dean Goldfine and Theodor Devoty.

In March 2021, his relationship with Ivana Nedvědová, daughter of footballer Pavel Nedvěd, was reported in the media.

== Performance timeline ==
Key
W	F	SF	QF	#R	RR	Q#	P#	DNQ	A	Z#	PO	G	S	B	NMS	NTI	P	NH

(W) winner; (F) finalist; (SF) semifinalist; (QF) quarterfinalist; (#R) rounds 4, 3, 2, 1; (RR) round-robin stage; (Q#) qualification round; (P#) preliminary round; (DNQ) did not qualify; (A) absent; (Z#) Davis/Fed Cup Zonal Group (with number indication) or (PO) play-off; (G) gold, (S) silver or (B) bronze Olympic/Paralympic medal; (NMS) not a Masters tournament; (NTI) not a Tier I tournament; (P) postponed; (NH) not held; (SR) strike rate (events won / competed); (W–L) win–loss record.
To avoid confusion and double counting, these charts are updated at the conclusion of a tournament or when the player's participation has ended.

=== Singles ===
Current through the 2026 Miami Open.

Tournament	2018	2019	2020	2021	2022	2023	2024	2025	2026	SR	W–L	Win %
Grand Slam tournaments
Australian Open	A	Q1	A	A	3R	QF	3R	2R	1R	0 / 5	9–5	64%
French Open	A	A	4R	1R	3R	2R	3R	3R	A	0 / 6	10–6	63%
Wimbledon	A	A	NH	4R	A	1R	1R	A	A	0 / 3	3–3	50%
US Open	Q2	Q1	1R	1R	2R	1R	2R	1R	A	0 / 6	2–6	25%
Win–loss	0–0	0–0	3–2	3–3	5–3	5–4	5–4	3–3	0–1	0 / 20	24–20	56%
National representation
Davis Cup	A	A	A	A	QF	A	QF	A		0 / 2	2–0	100%
ATP 1000 tournaments
Indian Wells Open	Q1	A	NH	2R	2R	A	3R	2R	2R	0 / 5	3–5	38%
Miami Open	A	A	NH	QF	3R	A	3R	QF	4R	0 / 5	12–5	71%
Monte-Carlo Masters	A	A	NH	A	3R	A	2R	1R	A	0 / 3	3–3	50%
Madrid Open	A	A	NH	Q1	2R	2R	3R	3R	A	0 / 4	3–4	43%
Italian Open	A	A	A	A	1R	2R	3R	3R	A	0 / 4	2–4	33%
Canadian Open	A	A	NH	A	A	2R	SF	A	A	0 / 2	4–2	67%
Cincinnati Open	A	Q1	1R	2R	3R	1R	1R	A	A	0 / 5	3–5	38%
Shanghai Masters	A	A	NH			SF	A	1R		0 / 2	4–2	67%
Paris Masters	A	A	A	3R	1R	1R	A	1R		0 / 4	2–4	33%
Win–loss	0–0	0–0	0–1	7–4	8–7	5–6	8–7	5–7	3–2	0 / 34	36–34	51%
Career statistics
Tournaments	1	0	3	18	22	17	20	19	7	Career total: 107		
Titles	0	0	0	1	0	0	1	0	1	Career total: 3		
Finals	0	0	0	2	2	2	2	1	1	Career total: 10		
Overall win–loss	0–1	0–0	3–3	31–18	34–22	26–16	31–19	22–18	12–6	3 / 107	159–103	61%
Year-end ranking	524	249	118	41	33	24	22	48		$8,999,774		

== ATP 1000 finals ==
=== Doubles: 2 (1 title, 1 runner-up) ===
Result	Year	Tournament	Surface	Partner	Opponents	Score
Win	2024	Madrid Open	Clay	(Australia) Jordan Thompson	(Uruguay) Ariel Behar (Czech Republic) Adam Pavlásek	6–3, 7–6^{(9–7)}
Loss	2025	Indian Wells Open	Hard	(Australia) Jordan Thompson	(El Salvador) Marcelo Arévalo (Croatia) Mate Pavić	3–6, 4–6

== ATP Tour finals ==
=== Singles: 10 (3 titles, 7 runner-ups) ===
Legend Grand Slam (–) ATP 1000 (–) ATP 500 (1–0) ATP 250 (2–7)	Finals by surface Hard (2–6) Clay (1–0) Grass (0–1)	Finals by setting Outdoor (3–4) Indoor (0–3)

Result	W–L	Date	Tournament	Tier	Surface	Opponent	Score
Loss	0–1	Jan 2021	Delray Beach Open, US	ATP 250	Hard	(Poland) Hubert Hurkacz	3–6, 3–6
Win	1–1	May 2021	Emilia-Romagna Open, Italy	ATP 250	Clay	(Italy) Marco Cecchinato	6–2, 6–4
Loss	1–2	Oct 2022	Gijón Open, Spain	ATP 250	Hard (i)	Andrey Rublev	2–6, 3–6
Loss	1–3	Oct 2022	European Open, Belgium	ATP 250	Hard (i)	(Canada) Félix Auger-Aliassime	3–6, 4–6
Loss	1–4	Jan 2023	Adelaide International I, Australia	ATP 250	Hard	(Serbia) Novak Djokovic	7–6^{(10–8)}, 6–7^{(3–7)}, 4–6
Loss	1–5	Sep 2023	Astana Open, Kazakhstan	ATP 250	Hard (i)	(France) Adrian Mannarino	6–4, 3–6, 2–6
Loss	1–6	Jun 2024	Rosmalen Grass Court Championships, Netherlands	ATP 250	Grass	(Australia) Alex de Minaur	2–6, 4–6
Win	2–6	Aug 2024	Washington Open, US	ATP 500	Hard	(Italy) Flavio Cobolli	4–6, 6–2, 6–0
Loss	2–7	Jan 2025	Adelaide International, Australia	ATP 250	Hard	(Canada) Félix Auger-Aliassime	3–6, 6–3, 1–6
Win	3–7	Feb 2026	Delray Beach Open, US	ATP 250	Hard	(United States) Tommy Paul	6–4, 6–3

=== Doubles: 2 (1 title, 1 runner-up) ===
Legend Grand Slam (–) ATP 1000 (1–1) ATP 500 (–) ATP 250 (–)	Finals by surface Hard (0–1) Clay (1–0) Grass (–)	Finals by setting Outdoor (1–1) Indoor (–)

Result	W–L	Date	Tournament	Tier	Surface	Partner	Opponents	Score
Win	1–0	Apr 2024	Madrid Open, Spain	ATP 1000	Clay	(Australia) Jordan Thompson	(Uruguay) Ariel Behar (Czech Republic) Adam Pavlásek	6–3, 7–6^{(9–7)}
Loss	1–1	Mar 2025	Indian Wells Open, US	ATP 1000	Hard	(Australia) Jordan Thompson	(El Salvador) Marcelo Arévalo (Croatia) Mate Pavić	3–6, 4–6

== ATP Next Generation finals ==
=== Singles: 1 (runner-up) ===
Result	Date	Tournament	Surface	Opponent	Score
Loss	Nov 2021	Next Generation ATP Finals, Italy	Hard (i)	(Spain) Carlos Alcaraz	3–4^{(5–7)}, 2–4, 2–4

== ATP Challenger and ITF Tour finals ==
=== Singles: 11 (2 titles, 9 runner-ups) ===
Legend ATP Challenger Tour (2–3) ITF Futures/WTT (0–6)	Finals by surface Hard (1–6) Clay (0–3) Carpet (1–0)

Result	W–L	Date	Tournament	Tier	Surface	Opponent	Score
Loss	0–1	Jul 2019	President's Cup, Kazakhstan	Challenger	Hard	(Russia) Evgeny Donskoy	6–7^{(5–7)}, 6–3, 4–6
Loss	0–2	Nov 2019	JSM Challenger of Champaign–Urbana, US	Challenger	Hard (i)	(United States) J. J. Wolf	4–6, 7–6^{(7–3)}, 6–7^{(6–8)}
Win	1–2	Nov 2020	Challenger Eckental, Germany	Challenger	Carpet (i)	(India) Ramkumar Ramanathan	6–4, 6–4
Win	2–2	Jan 2021	Open Quimper Bretagne, France	Challenger	Hard (i)	(Slovakia) Filip Horanský	6–1, 6–1
Loss	2–3	Jan 2026	San Diego Open, US	Challenger	Hard	(United States) Zachary Svajda	4–6, 6–7^{(5–7)}

Result	W–L	Date	Tournament	Tier	Surface	Opponent	Score
Loss	0–1	Oct 2017	F33 Houston, US	Futures	Hard	(United States) Thai-Son Kwiatkowski	2–6, 2–6
Loss	0–2	Aug 2018	F21 Decatur, US	Futures	Hard	(Peru) Nicolás Álvarez	4–6, 6–3, 3–6
Loss	0–3	Aug 2018	F22 Edwardsville, US	Futures	Hard	(Argentina) Axel Geller	2–6, 6–4, 6–7^{(0–7)}
Loss	0–4	Feb 2019	M15 Antalya, Turkey	WTT	Clay	(Kazakhstan) Dmitry Popko	4–6, 6–3, 3–6
Loss	0–5	Mar 2019	M15 Antalya, Turkey	WTT	Clay	(Kazakhstan) Dmitry Popko	7–5, 5–7, 5–7
Loss	0–6	Apr 2019	M15 Sunrise, US	WTT	Clay	(Kazakhstan) Dmitry Popko	3–6, 6–3, 4–6

=== Doubles: 6 (2 titles, 4 runner-ups) ===
Legend ATP Challenger Tour (0–1) ITF Futures/WTT (2–3)	Finals by surface Hard (0–2) Clay (2–2)

Result	W–L	Date	Tournament	Tier	Surface	Partner	Opponents	Score
Loss	0–1	Mar 2020	Oracle Challenger Series – Indian Wells, US	Challenger	Hard	(United States) Mitchell Krueger	(United States) Denis Kudla (United States) Thai-Son Kwiatkowski	3–6, 6–2, [6–10]

Result	W–L	Date	Tournament	Tier	Surface	Partner	Opponents	Score
Win	1–0	May 2018	F11 Valldoreix, Spain	Futures	Clay	(Brazil) Orlando Luz	(Netherlands) Michiel de Krom (Brazil) Felipe Meligeni Alves	3–6, 6–2, [10–7]
Win	2–0	Feb 2019	M25 Weston, US	WTT	Clay	(Colombia) Nicolás Mejía	(United States) Harrison Adams (United States) Jordi Arconada	6–3, 3–6, [11–9]
Loss	2–1	Mar 2019	M15 Antalya, Turkey	WTT	Clay	(Colombia) Nicolás Mejía	(Romania) Vasile-Alexandru Ghilea (Romania) Alexandru Jecan	2–6, 2–6
Loss	2–2	Mar 2019	M15 Antalya, Turkey	WTT	Clay	(Colombia) Nicolás Mejía	(Peru) Arklon Huertas del Pino (Peru) Conner Huertas del Pino	6–7^{(3–7)}, 6–4, [6–10]
Loss	2–3	Jul 2019	M15 Almaty, Kazakhstan	WTT	Hard	(Kazakhstan) Denis Yevseyev	(Kazakhstan) Andrey Golubev (Russia) Konstantin Kravchuk	3–6, 2–6

== Junior Grand Slam finals ==
=== Singles: 1 (title) ===
Result	Year	Tournament	Surface	Opponent	Score
Win	2018	Australian Open	Hard	(Chinese Taipei) Tseng Chun-hsin	7–6^{(8–6)}, 6–4

== Wins over top 10 players ==
- Korda has a 10–23 record against players who were, at the time the match was played, ranked in the top 10.

Season	2018	2019	2020	2021	2022	2023	2024	2025	2026	Total
Wins	0	0	0	2	1	3	2	1	1	10

#	Player	Rk	Event	Surface	Rd	Score	Rk	Ref
2021
1.	(Argentina) Diego Schwartzman	9	Miami Open, United States	Hard	4R	6–3, 4–6, 7–5	87	
2.	(Spain) Roberto Bautista Agut	10	Halle Open, Germany	Grass	1R	6–3, 7–6^{(7–0)}	52	
2022
3.	(Canada) Félix Auger-Aliassime	10	Estoril Open, Portugal	Clay	QF	6–2, 6–2	37	
2023
4.	Daniil Medvedev	8	Australian Open, Australia	Hard	3R	7–6^{(9–7)}, 6–3, 7–6^{(7–4)}	31	
5.	(United States) Frances Tiafoe	10	Queen's Club, United Kingdom	Grass	2R	7–6^{(7–2)}, 6–3	32	
6.	Daniil Medvedev	3	Shanghai Masters, China	Hard	3R	7–6^{(10–8)}, 6–2	26	
2024
7.	(Bulgaria) Grigor Dimitrov	10	Queen's Club, United Kingdom	Grass	2R	6–4, 3–6, 7–5	23	
8.	(Germany) Alexander Zverev	4	Canadian Open, Canada	Hard	QF	7–6^{(7–5)}, 1–6, 6–4	18	
2025
9.	(Greece) Stefanos Tsitsipas	10	Miami Open, United States	Hard	3R	7–6^{(7–4)}, 6–3	25	
2026
10.	(Spain) Carlos Alcaraz	1	Miami Open, United States	Hard	3R	6–3, 5–7, 6–4	36	

- Key: (Rk) first use, opponent rank; (Rd) round; (Rk) 2nd use, player rank; (Ref) reference; (F) final; (SF) semifinal; (QF) quarterfinal; (#R) rounds 4, 3, 2, 1; (RR) round-robin stage; (Q#) qualifying rounds or stages (3), 2, 1.
