= 2022 Gijón Open – Doubles =

Doubles
- 2022 Gijón Open

Final
- Champions: (Argentina) Máximo González (Argentina) Andrés Molteni
- Runners-up: (United States) Nathaniel Lammons (United States) Jackson Withrow
- Score: 6–7^{(6–8)}, 7–6^{(7–4)}, [10–5]

Details
- Draw: 16 (2 WC )
- Seeds: 8

Events
Singles	Doubles
Gijón Open

Máximo González and Andrés Molteni defeated Nathaniel Lammons and Jackson Withrow in the final, 6–7^{(6–8)}, 7–6^{(7–4)}, [10–5] to win the doubles tennis title at the 2022 Gijón Open.

This was the first edition of the tournament.

== Seeds ==
1. (Spain) Marcel Granollers / (Argentina) Horacio Zeballos (first round)
2. (Italy) Simone Bolelli / (Italy) Fabio Fognini (quarterfinals)
3. (Brazil) Rafael Matos / (Spain) David Vega Hernández (quarterfinals)
4. (Portugal) Francisco Cabral / (United Kingdom) Jamie Murray (quarterfinals)

== Draw ==
=== Key ===
- Q = Qualifier
- WC = Wild card
- LL = Lucky loser
- Alt = Alternate
- ITF = ITF entry
- PR = Protected ranking
- SR = Special ranking
- SE = Special exempt
- JE = Junior exempt
- JR = Junior Accelerator Programme entrant
- CO = College Accelerator Programme entrant
- NG = Next Gen Accelerator Program entrant
- w/o = Walkover
- r = Retired
- d = Defaulted

=== Draw ===
First round
1	(Spain) M Granollers (Argentina) H Zeballos	6^{5}	4
(Belgium) S Gillé (France) F Martin	7^{7}	6
Alt	(Netherlands) S Arends (Netherlands) D Pel	6	6
(Ecuador) D Hidalgo (Colombia) C Rodríguez	1	2
3	(Brazil) R Matos (Spain) D Vega Hernández	6	6
WC	(Spain) A Davidovich Fokina (Spain) M Landaluce	3	3
(United States) M Giron (United States) H Reese	1	4
(United States) N Lammons (United States) J Withrow	6	6
(Argentina) M González (Argentina) A Molteni	6	6
(Spain) P Carreño Busta (Portugal) J Sousa	2	4
(Argentina) P Cachin (Argentina) F Cerúndolo	1	2
4	(Portugal) F Cabral (United Kingdom) J Murray	6	6
(Serbia) N Ćaćić (Monaco) H Nys	6	6^{9}	[16]
(South Africa) R Klaasen (Brazil) M Melo	2	7^{11}	[14]
WC	(Spain) S Martos Gornés (Spain) J Munar	3	6^{5}
2	(Italy) S Bolelli (Italy) F Fognini	6	7^{7}

Quarterfinals
(Belgium) S Gillé (France) F Martin	6	7^{7}
Alt	(Netherlands) S Arends (Netherlands) D Pel	4	6^{5}
3	(Brazil) R Matos (Spain) D Vega Hernández	7^{10}	4	[6]
(United States) N Lammons (United States) J Withrow	6^{8}	6	[10]
(Argentina) M González (Argentina) A Molteni	6	7
4	(Portugal) F Cabral (United Kingdom) J Murray	3	5
(Serbia) N Ćaćić (Monaco) H Nys	6	6
2	(Italy) S Bolelli (Italy) F Fognini	4	2

Semifinals
(Belgium) S Gillé (France) F Martin	4	4
(United States) N Lammons (United States) J Withrow	6	6
(Argentina) M González (Argentina) A Molteni	7	6
(Serbia) N Ćaćić (Monaco) H Nys	5	2

Final
(United States) N Lammons (United States) J Withrow	7^{8}	6^{4}	[5]
(Argentina) M González (Argentina) A Molteni	6^{6}	7^{7}	[10]
