= 2026 Miami Open – Wheelchair women's doubles =

Wheelchair women's doubles
- 2026 Miami Open

Final
- Champions: (Colombia) Angelica Bernal (China) Zhenzhen Zhu
- Runners-up: (France) Ksenia Chasteau (Netherlands) Lizzy de Greef
- Score: 6–1, 5–7, 6–4

Events
Singles	men	women
Doubles	men	women
WC Singles	men	women
WC Doubles	men	women
- Miami Open

Angélica Bernal and Zhenzhen Zhu won the women's doubles event, defeating Ksenia Chasteau and Lizzy de Greef in the final, 6–1, 5–7, 6–4.

== Seeds ==
1. (Colombia) Angelica Bernal / (China) Zhenzhen Zhu (champions)
2. (United Kingdom) Lucy Shuker / (Netherlands) Aniek van Koot (semifinal)

== Draw ==
Key

- Q = Qualifier
- WC = Wild card
- LL = Lucky loser
- Alt = Alternate
- ITF = ITF entry
- PR = Protected ranking
- SR = Special ranking
- SE = Special exempt
- JE = Junior exempt
- JR = Junior Accelerator Programme entrant
- CO = College Accelerator Programme entrant
- NG = Next Gen Accelerator Program entrant
- w/o = Walkover
- r = Retired
- d = Defaulted

=== Finals ===
Semifinals
1	(Colombia) Angelica Bernal (China) Zhenzhen Zhu	w/o
(South Africa) Kgothatso Montjane (United States) Maylee Phelps
(France) Ksenia Chasteau (Netherlands) Lizzy de Greef	6	6
2	(United Kingdom) Lucy Shuker (Netherlands) Aniek van Koot	1	1

Finals
1	(Colombia) Angelica Bernal (China) Zhenzhen Zhu	6	5	6
(France) Ksenia Chasteau (Netherlands) Lizzy de Greef	1	7	4
