= 2022 Gijón Open – Singles =

Singles
- 2022 Gijón Open

Final
- Champion: Andrey Rublev
- Runner-up: (United States) Sebastian Korda
- Score: 6–2, 6–3

Details
- Draw: 28 (4 Q / 3 WC )
- Seeds: 8

Events
Singles	Doubles
Gijón Open

Andrey Rublev defeated Sebastian Korda in the final, 6–2, 6–3 to win the singles tennis title at the 2022 Gijón Open. It was his 12th ATP Tour singles title.

This was the first edition of the tournament.

== Seeds ==
The top four seeds received a bye into the second round.

1. Andrey Rublev (champion)
2. (Spain) Pablo Carreño Busta (quarterfinals)
3. (Spain) Roberto Bautista Agut (second round)
4. (Argentina) Francisco Cerúndolo (quarterfinals)
5. (United States) Tommy Paul (quarterfinals)
6. (Spain) Alejandro Davidovich Fokina (first round)
7. (Argentina) Sebastián Báez (first round, retired)
8. (Spain) Albert Ramos Viñolas (first round)

== Draw ==
=== Key ===
- Q = Qualifier
- WC = Wild card
- LL = Lucky loser
- Alt = Alternate
- SE = Special exempt
- PR = Protected ranking
- ITF = ITF entry
- JE = Junior exempt
- w/o = Walkover
- r = Retired
- d = Defaulted
- SR = Special ranking

=== Finals ===
Semifinals
1	Andrey Rublev	6	6
PR	(Austria) Dominic Thiem	4	4
(United States) Sebastian Korda	7^{7}	6
(France) Arthur Rinderknech	6^{2}	3

Final
1	Andrey Rublev	6	6
(United States) Sebastian Korda	2	3

=== Top half ===
First round
I Ivashka	6	6^{5}	6
WC	(Spain) F López	3	7^{7}	4
Q	(Argentina) M Trungelliti	6	3	0
Q	(Spain) N Álvarez Varona	1	6	6
WC	(Spain) M Landaluce	3	0
5	(United States) T Paul	6	6
Q	(France) M Guinard	4	6	2
(Italy) F Fognini	6	0	0^{r}
PR	(Austria) D Thiem	6	6
(Portugal) J Sousa	2	0
(United States) M Giron	4	6	6
8	(Spain) A Ramos Viñolas	6	4	2

Second round
1	A Rublev	6	5	6
I Ivashka	3	7	4
Q	(Spain) N Álvarez Varona	3	6^{3}
5	(United States) T Paul	6	7^{7}
4	(Argentina) F Cerúndolo	7^{7}	6
Q	(France) M Guinard	6^{5}	2
PR	(Austria) D Thiem	3	6	6
(United States) M Giron	6	4	0

Quarterfinals
1	A Rublev	7	6
5	(United States) T Paul	5	3
4	(Argentina) F Cerúndolo	4	3
PR	(Austria) D Thiem	6	6

Semifinals
1	A Rublev	6	6
PR	(Austria) D Thiem	4	4

=== Bottom half ===
First round
6	(Spain) A Davidovich Fokina	5	2
WC	(United Kingdom) A Murray	7	6
(Argentina) P Cachin	7^{7}	6
Q	A Vatutin	6^{2}	0
(United States) S Korda	6	6
(Spain) J Munar	4	1
7	(Argentina) S Báez	6^{5}	4^{r}
(France) C Lestienne	7^{7}	4
(France) A Rinderknech	6	6
LL	(Spain) C Taberner	3	3
(France) B Bonzi	4	5
(Brazil) T Monteiro	6	7

Second round
WC	(United Kingdom) A Murray	2	7	7^{7}
(Argentina) P Cachin	6	5	6^{3}
(United States) S Korda	5	6	6
3	(Spain) R Bautista Agut	7	4	4
(France) C Lestienne	4	2
(France) A Rinderknech	6	6
(Brazil) T Monteiro	4	6^{3}
2	(Spain) P Carreño Busta	6	7^{7}

Quarterfinals
WC	(United Kingdom) A Murray	4	6	1
(United States) S Korda	6	1	6
(France) A Rinderknech	4	6	7^{18}
2	(Spain) P Carreño Busta	6	3	6^{16}

Semifinals
(United States) S Korda	7^{7}	6
(France) A Rinderknech	6^{2}	3

== Qualifying ==
=== Seeds ===
1. (Spain) Carlos Taberner (qualifying competition, lucky loser)
2. (France) Manuel Guinard (qualified)
3. (Bulgaria) Dimitar Kuzmanov (first round, withdrew)
4. (Italy) Raúl Brancaccio (first round)
5. (Spain) Nicolás Álvarez Varona (qualified)
6. (Argentina) Marco Trungelliti (qualified)
7. Alexey Vatutin (qualified)
8. (Spain) Nikolás Sánchez Izquierdo (qualifying competition)

=== Qualifiers ===
1. Alexey Vatutin
2. (France) Manuel Guinard
3. (Spain) Nicolás Álvarez Varona
4. (Argentina) Marco Trungelliti

=== Lucky loser ===
1. (Spain) Carlos Taberner

=== Qualifying draw ===
==== First qualifier ====
First round
1	(Spain) Carlos Taberner	7	6^{6}	7^{7}
(Romania) Filip Cristian Jianu	5	7^{8}	6^{5}
WC	(Spain) Alberto Barroso Campos	3	4
7	Alexey Vatutin	6	6

Qualifying competition
1	(Spain) Carlos Taberner	2	2
7	Alexey Vatutin	6	6

==== Second qualifier ====
First round
2	(France) Manuel Guinard	6	6
Alt	(Spain) Eduard Esteve Lobato	2	2
(Switzerland) Johan Nikles	2	6	1
8	(Spain) Nikolás Sánchez Izquierdo	6	1	6

Qualifying competition
2	(France) Manuel Guinard	4	7	7
8	(Spain) Nikolás Sánchez Izquierdo	6	5	5

==== Third qualifier ====
First round
3	(Bulgaria) Dimitar Kuzmanov
(Italy) Lorenzo Giustino	w/o
(Spain) Oriol Roca Batalla	6	3	2
5	(Spain) Nicolás Álvarez Varona	4	6	6

Qualifying competition
(Italy) Lorenzo Giustino	2	2
5	(Spain) Nicolás Álvarez Varona	6	6

==== Fourth qualifier ====
First round
4	(Italy) Raúl Brancaccio	4	4
(France) Titouan Droguet	6	6
WC	(Spain) Daniel Mérida	3	4
6	(Argentina) Marco Trungelliti	6	6

Qualifying competition
(France) Titouan Droguet	3	2
6	(Argentina) Marco Trungelliti	6	6
