= 2026 Miami Open – Wheelchair women's singles =

Wheelchair women's singles
- 2026 Miami Open

Final
- Champion: (Netherlands) Aniek van Koot
- Runner-up: (Netherlands) Lizzy de Greef
- Score: 3–6, 6–4, 6–4

Events
Singles	men	women
Doubles	men	women
WC Singles	men	women
WC Doubles	men	women
- Miami Open

Aniek van Koot won the women's singles title, defeating Lizzy de Greef in the final, 3–6, 6–4, 6–4.

== Seeds ==
1. (Netherlands) Aniek van Koot (champion)
2. (South Africa) Kgothatso Montjane (quarterfinal)

== Draw ==
Key

- Q = Qualifier
- WC = Wild card
- LL = Lucky loser
- Alt = Alternate
- ITF = ITF entry
- PR = Protected ranking
- SR = Special ranking
- SE = Special exempt
- JE = Junior exempt
- JR = Junior Accelerator Programme entrant
- CO = College Accelerator Programme entrant
- NG = Next Gen Accelerator Program entrant
- w/o = Walkover
- r = Retired
- d = Defaulted

=== Finals ===
Quarterfinals
1	(Netherlands) Aniek van Koot	6	6
(Colombia) Angelica Bernal	3	2
(China) Zhenzhen Zhu	6	6
(United Kingdom) Lucy Shuker	2	3
(France) Ksénia Chasteau	6	6
(United States) Maylee Phelps	1	1
(Netherlands) Lizzy de Greef	6	6
2	(South Africa) Kgothatso Montjane	0	4

Semifinals
1	(Netherlands) Aniek van Koot	6	7
(China) Zhenzhen Zhu	4	5
(France) Ksénia Chasteau	4	1
(Netherlands) Lizzy de Greef	6	6

Final
1	(Netherlands) Aniek van Koot	3	6	6
(Netherlands) Lizzy de Greef	6	4	4
