= 2026 Delray Beach Open – Singles =

Singles
- 2026 Delray Beach Open

Final
- Champion: (United States) Sebastian Korda
- Runner-up: (United States) Tommy Paul
- Score: 6–4, 6–3

Details
- Draw: 28 (4 Q / 3 WC )
- Seeds: 8

Events
Singles	Doubles
- Delray Beach Open

Sebastian Korda defeated Tommy Paul in the final, 6–4, 6–3 to win the singles tennis title at the 2026 Delray Beach Open. It was his third ATP Tour title. Korda was the first unseeded champion at the event since Radu Albot in 2019.

Miomir Kecmanović was the defending champion, but lost in the second round to Learner Tien.

== Seeds ==
The top four seeds received a bye into the second round.

1. (United States) Taylor Fritz (quarterfinals)
2. (Norway) Casper Ruud (quarterfinals)
3. (Italy) Flavio Cobolli (semifinals)
4. (United States) Learner Tien (semifinals)
5. (United States) Tommy Paul (final)
6. (Monaco) Valentin Vacherot (first round)
7. (United States) Brandon Nakashima (second round)
8. (United States) Frances Tiafoe (quarterfinals)

== Draw ==
Key

- Q = Qualifier
- WC = Wild card
- LL = Lucky loser
- Alt = Alternate
- ITF = ITF entry
- PR = Protected ranking
- SR = Special ranking
- SE = Special exempt
- JE = Junior exempt
- JR = Junior Accelerator Programme entrant
- CO = College Accelerator Programme entrant
- NG = Next Gen Accelerator Program entrant
- w/o = Walkover
- r = Retired
- d = Defaulted

=== Finals ===
Semifinals
5	(United States) Tommy Paul	4	6	6
4	(United States) Learner Tien	6	4	3
3	(Italy) Flavio Cobolli	6^{1}	1
(United States) Sebastian Korda	7^{7}	6

Final
5	(United States) Tommy Paul	4	3
(United States) Sebastian Korda	6	6

=== Top half ===
First round
(United States) E Quinn	2	3
NG	(Spain) R Jódar	6	6
LL	(Australia) A Walton	7^{7}	6
(Canada) G Diallo	6^{4}	3
(France) C Moutet	6	3	4
5	(United States) T Paul	4	6	6
(Serbia) M Kecmanović	6	6
(Italy) M Bellucci	1	4
(United States) A Kovacevic	6^{4}	3
Q	(United States) Z Svajda	7^{7}	6
Q	(Australia) R Hijikata	4	4
8	(United States) F Tiafoe	6	6

Second round
1	(United States) T Fritz	7^{7}	6
NG	(Spain) R Jódar	6^{4}	4
LL	(Australia) A Walton	6^{11}	3
5	(United States) T Paul	7^{13}	6
4	(United States) L Tien	6	6^{4}	7^{7}
(Serbia) M Kecmanović	4	7^{7}	6^{5}
Q	(United States) Z Svajda	4	6	5
8	(United States) F Tiafoe	6	3	7

Quarterfinals
1	(United States) T Fritz	4	3
5	(United States) T Paul	6	6
4	(United States) L Tien	7^{7}	3	7
8	(United States) F Tiafoe	6^{5}	6	5

Semifinals
5	(United States) T Paul	4	6	6
4	(United States) L Tien	6	4	3

=== Bottom half ===
First round
7	(United States) B Nakashima	7^{7}	7^{7}
(Croatia) M Čilić	6^{4}	6^{5}
(Portugal) N Borges	6^{5}	6	3
Q	(Hong Kong) C Wong	7^{7}	4	6
WC	(United States) P Kypson	3	6	4
(France) T Atmane	6	2	6
6	(Monaco) V Vacherot	6^{4}	4
(United States) A Michelsen	7^{7}	6
(United States) S Korda	6	7
WC	(United States) M McDonald	4	5
Q	(Japan) S Shimabukuro	3	5
(United States) M Giron	6	7

Second round
7	(United States) B Nakashima	4	6^{4}
Q	(Hong Kong) C Wong	6	7^{7}
(France) T Atmane	5	4
3	(Italy) F Cobolli	7	6
(United States) A Michelsen	3	6^{6}
(United States) S Korda	6	7^{8}
(United States) M Giron	6	6^{6}	4
2	(Norway) C Ruud	4	7^{8}	6

Quarterfinals
Q	(Hong Kong) C Wong	5	7^{9}	2
3	(Italy) F Cobolli	7	6^{7}	6
(United States) S Korda	4	6	6
2	(Norway) C Ruud	6	2	2

Semifinals
3	(Italy) F Cobolli	6^{1}	1
(United States) S Korda	7^{7}	6

== Qualifying ==
=== Seeds ===
1. (Australia) Adam Walton (qualifying competition, lucky loser)
2. (Czech Republic) Dalibor Svrčina (qualifying competition)
3. (Australia) Tristan Schoolkate (qualifying competition)
4. (United States) Zachary Svajda (qualified)
5. (Australia) Rinky Hijikata (qualified)
6. (Hong Kong) Coleman Wong (qualified)
7. (United States) Colton Smith (first round)
8. (Japan) Sho Shimabukuro (qualified)

=== Qualifiers ===
1. (Japan) Sho Shimabukuro
2. (Australia) Rinky Hijikata
3. (Hong Kong) Coleman Wong
4. (United States) Zachary Svajda

=== Lucky Loser ===
1. (Australia) Adam Walton

=== Qualifying draw ===
==== First qualifier ====
First round
1	(Australia) Adam Walton	6	4	6
Alt	(United States) Nicolas Moreno de Alboran	3	6	4
WC	(United States) Benjamin Willwerth	4	6^{4}
8	(Japan) Sho Shimabukuro	6	7^{7}

Qualifying competition
1	(Australia) Adam Walton	3	4
8	(Japan) Sho Shimabukuro	6	6

==== Second qualifier ====
First round
2	(Czech Republic) Dalibor Svrčina	3	6	6
Alt	(Colombia) Nicolás Mejía	6	1	4
WC	(United States) Michael Mmoh	3	6	6^{2}
5	(Australia) Rinky Hijikata	6	3	7^{7}

Qualifying competition
2	(Czech Republic) Dalibor Svrčina	4	3
5	(Australia) Rinky Hijikata	6	6

==== Third qualifier ====
First round
3	(Australia) Tristan Schoolkate	6	7^{7}
Alt	(United States) Murphy Cassone	4	6^{5}
(Japan) Yoshihito Nishioka	2	2
6	(Hong Kong) Coleman Wong	6	6

Qualifying competition
3	(Australia) Tristan Schoolkate	4	4
6	(Hong Kong) Coleman Wong	6	6

==== Fourth qualifier ====
First round
4	(United States) Zachary Svajda	6	6
(Canada) Liam Draxl	2	1
Alt	(China) Wu Yibing	7	6
7	(United States) Colton Smith	5	1

Qualifying competition
4	(United States) Zachary Svajda	6	6
Alt	(China) Wu Yibing	3	4
