= 2026 Miami Open – Men's doubles =

Men's doubles
- 2026 Miami Open

Final
- Champions: (Italy) Simone Bolelli (Italy) Andrea Vavassori
- Runners-up: (Finland) Harri Heliövaara (United Kingdom) Henry Patten
- Score: 6–4, 6–2

Events
Singles	men	women
Doubles	men	women
WC Singles	men	women
WC Doubles	men	women
- Miami Open

Simone Bolelli and Andrea Vavassori defeated Harri Heliövaara and Henry Patten in the final, 6–4, 6–2 to win the men's doubles title at the 2026 Miami Open. It was the first ATP Masters 1000 title for both players. With the victory, Bolelli became the first Italian man to win 20 tour-level doubles titles in the Open Era.

Marcelo Arévalo and Mate Pavić were the defending champions, but lost in the quarterfinals to Heliövaara and Patten.

Horacio Zeballos regained the ATP No. 1 doubles ranking after reaching the semifinals. Neal Skupski was also in contention at the beginning of the tournament.

== Seeds ==
1. (Spain) Marcel Granollers / (Argentina) Horacio Zeballos (semifinals)
2. (United Kingdom) Julian Cash / (United Kingdom) Lloyd Glasspool (second round)
3. (United States) Christian Harrison / (United Kingdom) Neal Skupski (quarterfinals)
4. (Finland) Harri Heliövaara / (United Kingdom) Henry Patten (final)
5. (El Salvador) Marcelo Arévalo / (Croatia) Mate Pavić (quarterfinals)
6. (Argentina) Guido Andreozzi / (France) Manuel Guinard (first round)
7. (Italy) Simone Bolelli / (Italy) Andrea Vavassori (champions)
8. (Monaco) Hugo Nys / (France) Édouard Roger-Vasselin (quarterfinals)

== Draw ==
Key

- Q = Qualifier
- WC = Wild card
- LL = Lucky loser
- Alt = Alternate
- ITF = ITF entry
- PR = Protected ranking
- SR = Special ranking
- SE = Special exempt
- JE = Junior exempt
- JR = Junior Accelerator Programme entrant
- CO = College Accelerator Programme entrant
- NG = Next Gen Accelerator Program entrant
- w/o = Walkover
- r = Retired
- d = Defaulted

=== Finals ===
Semifinals
1	(Spain) Marcel Granollers (Argentina) Horacio Zeballos	2	3
4	(Finland) Harri Heliövaara (United Kingdom) Henry Patten	6	6
7	(Italy) Simone Bolelli (Italy) Andrea Vavassori	6	6
(Netherlands) Sander Arends (Australia) John-Patrick Smith	3	4

Final
4	(Finland) Harri Heliövaara (United Kingdom) Henry Patten	4	2
7	(Italy) Simone Bolelli (Italy) Andrea Vavassori	6	6

=== Top half ===
First round
1	(Spain) M Granollers (Argentina) H Zeballos	6	5	[10]
(Portugal) F Cabral (Austria) L Miedler	4	7	[5]
(United Kingdom) L Johnson (Poland) J Zieliński	4	6^{2}
(France) T Arribagé (France) A Olivetti	6	7^{7}
(Germany) K Krawietz (Austria) N Oberleitner	6	6
WC	(United States) B Kittay (United States) R Seggerman	4	4
(United States) R Cash (United States) JJ Tracy	4	3
8	(Monaco) H Nys (France) É Roger-Vasselin	6	6
4	(Finland) H Heliövaara (United Kingdom) H Patten	6	6
(Sweden) A Göransson (United States) A Michelsen	3	2
(Mexico) S González (Netherlands) D Pel	6^{3}	6	[10]
(Italy) L Darderi (Brazil) F Romboli	7^{7}	2	[8]
(France) S Doumbia (France) F Reboul	6	6
WC	(Germany) C Frantzen (Netherlands) R Haase	2	4
(Austria) A Erler (United States) R Galloway	1	3
5	(El Salvador) M Arévalo (Croatia) M Pavić	6	6

Second round
1	(Spain) M Granollers (Argentina) H Zeballos	6	7^{8}
(France) T Arribagé (France) A Olivetti	4	6^{6}
(Germany) K Krawietz (Austria) N Oberleitner	2	4
8	(Monaco) H Nys (France) É Roger-Vasselin	6	6
4	(Finland) H Heliövaara (United Kingdom) H Patten	6	6
(Mexico) S González (Netherlands) D Pel	2	4
(France) S Doumbia (France) F Reboul	4	4
5	(El Salvador) M Arévalo (Croatia) M Pavić	6	6

Quarterfinals
1	(Spain) M Granollers (Argentina) H Zeballos	6	7^{7}
8	(Monaco) H Nys (France) É Roger-Vasselin	3	6^{3}
4	(Finland) H Heliövaara (United Kingdom) H Patten	6	6
5	(El Salvador) M Arévalo (Croatia) M Pavić	3	4

Semifinals
1	(Spain) M Granollers (Argentina) H Zeballos	2	3
4	(Finland) H Heliövaara (United Kingdom) H Patten	6	6

=== Bottom half ===
First round
7	(Italy) S Bolelli (Italy) A Vavassori	5	7^{7}	[13]
(Monaco) R Arneodo (United States) R Ram	7	6^{2}	[11]
WC	(United States) M Damm (Brazil) M Demoliner	6	3	[6]
(Argentina) TM Etcheverry (Chile) A Tabilo	3	6	[10]
(Brazil) M Melo (Germany) A Zverev	6	6^{5}	[4]
(United States) E King (Australia) J Peers	4	7^{7}	[10]
(Australia) A de Minaur (Australia) R Hijikata	2	3
3	(United States) C Harrison (United Kingdom) N Skupski	6	6
6	(Argentina) G Andreozzi (France) M Guinard	1	6^{6}
(United States) A Krajicek (Croatia) N Mektić	6	7^{8}
(Brazil) O Luz (Brazil) R Matos	6	6
(Argentina) M González (Argentina) A Molteni	4	4
(Netherlands) S Arends (Australia) J-P Smith	4	7	[15]
(India) Y Bhambri (New Zealand) M Venus	6	5	[13]
(Czech Republic) P Nouza (Czech Republic) P Rikl	4	3
2	(United Kingdom) J Cash (United Kingdom) L Glasspool	6	6

Second round
7	(Italy) S Bolelli (Italy) A Vavassori	6	7^{7}
(Argentina) TM Etcheverry (Chile) A Tabilo	3	6^{5}
(United States) E King (Australia) J Peers	1	4
3	(United States) C Harrison (United Kingdom) N Skupski	6	6
(United States) A Krajicek (Croatia) N Mektić	7	6
(Brazil) O Luz (Brazil) R Matos	5	4
(Netherlands) S Arends (Australia) J-P Smith	6^{3}	6	[10]
2	(United Kingdom) J Cash (United Kingdom) L Glasspool	7^{7}	2	[4]

Quarterfinals
7	(Italy) S Bolelli (Italy) A Vavassori	7	5	[10]
3	(United States) C Harrison (United Kingdom) N Skupski	5	7	[6]
(United States) A Krajicek (Croatia) N Mektić	6	3	[8]
(Netherlands) S Arends (Australia) J-P Smith	4	6	[10]

Semifinals
7	(Italy) S Bolelli (Italy) A Vavassori	6	6
(Netherlands) S Arends (Australia) J-P Smith	3	4

== Seeded teams ==
The following are the seeded teams. Seedings are based on ATP rankings as of March 16, 2026.

Country	Player	Country	Player	Rank	Seed
ESP	Marcel Granollers	ARG	Horacio Zeballos	5	1
GBR	Julian Cash	GBR	Lloyd Glasspool	9	2
USA	Christian Harrison	GBR	Neal Skupski	12	3
FIN	Harri Heliövaara	GBR	Henry Patten	12	4
ESA	Marcelo Arévalo	CRO	Mate Pavić	18	5
ARG	Guido Andreozzi	FRA	Manuel Guinard	32	6
ITA	Simone Bolelli	ITA	Andrea Vavassori	33	7
MON	Hugo Nys	FRA	Édouard Roger-Vasselin	39	8

== Other entry information ==
=== Wildcards ===
- (United States) Martin Damm / (Brazil) Marcelo Demoliner
- (Germany) Constantin Frantzen / (Netherlands) Robin Haase
- (United States) Benjamin Kittay / (United States) Ryan Seggerman
