= 2022 Gijón Open =

- Date: 10–16 October
- Edition: 1st
- Category: ATP Tour 250
- Draw: 28S / 16D
- Prize money: €612,000
- Surface: Hard / indoor
- Location: Gijón, Spain
- Venue: Palacio de Deportes de Gijón

Champions

Singles
- Andrey Rublev

Doubles
- (Argentina) Máximo González / (Argentina) Andrés Molteni
Gijón Open

The 2022 Gijón Open was a professional men's tennis tournament played on indoor hard courts. It was the first edition of the event, and part of the ATP World Tour 250 series of the 2022 ATP Tour. It was played at Palacio de Deportes in Gijón, Spain, from 10 to 16 October 2022.

The event was one of six tournaments that were given single-year ATP 250 licenses in September and October 2022 due to the cancellation of tournaments in China because of the COVID-19 pandemic.

== Champions ==
=== Singles ===
- Andrey Rublev def. (United States) Sebastian Korda 6–2, 6–3

=== Doubles ===
- (Argentina) Máximo González / (Argentina) Andrés Molteni def. (United States) Nathaniel Lammons / (United States) Jackson Withrow 6–7^{(6–8)}, 7–6^{(7–4)}, [10–5]

== Singles main-draw entrants ==
=== Seeds ===
Country	Player	Rank^{†}	Seed
	Andrey Rublev	9	1
ESP	Pablo Carreño Busta	15	2
ESP	Roberto Bautista Agut	21	3
ARG	Francisco Cerúndolo	29	4
USA	Tommy Paul	30	5
ESP	Alejandro Davidovich Fokina	31	6
ARG	Sebastián Báez	35	7
ESP	Albert Ramos Viñolas	40	8

^{†} Rankings are as of 3 October 2022.

=== Other entrants ===
The following players received wildcards into the main draw:

- (Spain) Martín Landaluce
- (Spain) Feliciano López
- (United Kingdom) Andy Murray

The following player was accepted directly into the main draw using a protected ranking:

- (Austria) Dominic Thiem

The following players received entry from the qualifying draw:

- (Spain) Nicolás Álvarez Varona
- (France) Manuel Guinard
- (Argentina) Marco Trungelliti
- Alexey Vatutin

The following player received entry as a lucky loser:

- (Spain) Carlos Taberner

=== Withdrawals ===
- (France) Adrian Mannarino → replaced by (Spain) Carlos Taberner

== Doubles main-draw entrants ==
=== Seeds ===
Country	Player	Country	Player	Rank^{1}	Seed
ESP	Marcel Granollers	ARG	Horacio Zeballos	23	1
ITA	Simone Bolelli	ITA	Fabio Fognini	51	2
BRA	Rafael Matos	ESP	David Vega Hernández	70	3
POR	Francisco Cabral	GBR	Jamie Murray	77	4

- ^{1} Rankings as of 3 October 2022.

=== Other entrants ===
The following pairs received wildcards into the doubles main draw:

- (Spain) Alejandro Davidovich Fokina / (Spain) Martín Landaluce
- (Spain) Sergio Martos Gornés / (Spain) Jaume Munar

The following pair received entry as alternates:

- (Netherlands) Sander Arends / (Netherlands) David Pel

=== Withdrawals ===
- (United States) William Blumberg / (United States) Tommy Paul → replaced by (Ecuador) Diego Hidalgo / (Colombia) Cristian Rodríguez
- (India) Rohan Bopanna / (Netherlands) Matwé Middelkoop → replaced by (United States) Marcos Giron / (United States) Hunter Reese
- (France) Adrian Mannarino / (France) Fabrice Martin → replaced by (Belgium) Sander Gillé / (France) Fabrice Martin
- (Monaco) Hugo Nys / (Poland) Jan Zieliński → replaced by (Serbia) Nikola Ćaćić / (Monaco) Hugo Nys
- (Spain) Albert Ramos Viñolas / (Spain) Bernabé Zapata Miralles → replaced by (Netherlands) Sander Arends / (Netherlands) David Pel
