= 2026 Miami Open – Men's singles =

Tennis tournament event

Men's singles
- 2026 Miami Open

Final
- Champion: (Italy) Jannik Sinner
- Runner-up: (Czech Republic) Jiří Lehečka
- Score: 6–4, 6–4

Details
- Draw: 96
- Seeds: 32

Events
Singles	men	women
Doubles	men	women
WC Singles	men	women
WC Doubles	men	women
- Miami Open

Jannik Sinner defeated Jiří Lehečka in the final, 6–4, 6–4 to win the men's singles tennis title at the 2026 Miami Open. He did not drop a set en route to his second Miami Open title (after 2024) and seventh career ATP 1000 title, and he became the eighth man to win the Sunshine Double in singles (having won Indian Wells two weeks prior). It was a record-extending third consecutive ATP Masters 1000 title won without dropping a set. Sinner was also the first man to win the Sunshine Double without dropping a set. Lehečka was the first player to reach an ATP 1000 final without having his serve broken since Novak Djokovic at the 2018 Shanghai Masters.

Jakub Menšík was the defending champion, but lost in the third round to Frances Tiafoe.

At 17 years and 13 days old, Moïse Kouamé became the youngest player to win a main-draw match at the ATP 1000 level since Rafael Nadal at the 2003 Hamburg Masters, the youngest player to do so at the Miami Open, and the first player born in 2009 or later to win an ATP Tour main-draw match.

With his fourth-round win, world No. 151 Martín Landaluce became the lowest-ranked Miami Open quarterfinalist since No. 185 Jim Grabb in 1994. He was also the first player born in 2006 or later to advance to the quarterfinals at an ATP 1000 event.

== Seeds ==
All seeds received a bye into the second round.

1. (Spain) Carlos Alcaraz (third round)
2. (Italy) Jannik Sinner (champion)
3. (Germany) Alexander Zverev (semifinals)
4. (Italy) Lorenzo Musetti (withdrew)
5. (Australia) Alex de Minaur (second round)
6. (United States) Taylor Fritz (fourth round)
7. (Canada) Félix Auger-Aliassime (third round)
8. (United States) Ben Shelton (second round)
9. Daniil Medvedev (third round)
10. (Kazakhstan) Alexander Bublik (second round)
11. (Norway) Casper Ruud (second round)
12. (Czech Republic) Jakub Menšík (third round)
13. (Italy) Flavio Cobolli (second round)
14. Karen Khachanov (third round)
15. Andrey Rublev (second round)
16. (Spain) Alejandro Davidovich Fokina (second round)
17. (Italy) Luciano Darderi (second round)
18. (Argentina) Francisco Cerúndolo (quarterfinals)
19. (United States) Frances Tiafoe (quarterfinals)
20. (United States) Learner Tien (second round)
21. (Czech Republic) Jiří Lehečka (final)
22. (United States) Tommy Paul (quarterfinals)
23. (United Kingdom) Cameron Norrie (second round)
24. (Monaco) Valentin Vacherot (fourth round)
25. (United Kingdom) Jack Draper (second round)
26. (France) Arthur Rinderknech (second round)
27. (United States) Brandon Nakashima (second round)
28. (France) Arthur Fils (semifinals)
29. (Argentina) Tomás Martín Etcheverry (fourth round)
30. (France) Corentin Moutet (third round)
31. (France) Ugo Humbert (fourth round)
32. (United States) Sebastian Korda (fourth round)

Click on the seed number of a player to go to their draw section.

== Draw ==
Key

- Q = Qualifier
- WC = Wild card
- LL = Lucky loser
- Alt = Alternate
- ITF = ITF entry
- PR = Protected ranking
- SR = Special ranking
- SE = Special exempt
- JE = Junior exempt
- JR = Junior Accelerator Programme entrant
- CO = College Accelerator Programme entrant
- NG = Next Gen Accelerator Program entrant
- w/o = Walkover
- r = Retired
- d = Defaulted

=== Finals ===
Quarterfinals
Q	(Spain) Martín Landaluce	6^{1}	5
21	(Czech Republic) Jiří Lehečka	7^{7}	7
22	(United States) Tommy Paul	7^{7}	6^{4}	6^{6}
28	(France) Arthur Fils	6^{3}	7^{7}	7^{8}
18	(Argentina) Francisco Cerúndolo	1	2
3	(Germany) Alexander Zverev	6	6
19	(United States) Frances Tiafoe	2	2
2	(Italy) Jannik Sinner	6	6

Semifinals
21	(Czech Republic) Jiří Lehečka	6	6
28	(France) Arthur Fils	2	2
3	(Germany) Alexander Zverev	3	6^{4}
2	(Italy) Jannik Sinner	6	7^{7}

Final
21	(Czech Republic) Jiří Lehečka	4	4
2	(Italy) Jannik Sinner	6	6

=== Top half ===
==== Section 1 ====
First round
(Hungary) F Marozsán	4	6	2
(Brazil) J Fonseca	6	3	6
(France) G Mpetshi Perricard	6	3	6^{3}
(Argentina) C Ugo Carabelli	2	6	7^{7}
(United States) M Giron	3	6^{6}
Q	(Spain) M Landaluce	6	7^{8}
(Australia) J Duckworth	6^{3}	6^{4}
(Spain) R Bautista Agut	7^{7}	7^{7}

Second round
1	(Spain) C Alcaraz	6	6
(Brazil) J Fonseca	4	4
(Argentina) C Ugo Carabelli	0	3
32	(United States) S Korda	6	6
17	(Italy) L Darderi	3	7^{7}	4
Q	(Spain) M Landaluce	6	6^{4}	6
(Spain) R Bautista Agut	3	3
14	K Khachanov	6	6

Third round
1	(Spain) C Alcaraz	3	7	4
32	(United States) S Korda	6	5	6
Q	(Spain) M Landaluce	6	7^{7}
14	K Khachanov	3	6^{2}

Fourth round
32	(United States) S Korda	6	6^{6}	4
Q	(Spain) M Landaluce	2	7^{8}	6

==== Section 2 ====
First round
(United States) E Quinn	6	6
(Poland) H Hurkacz	2	4
WC	(France) M Kouamé	5	6	6
Q	(United States) Z Svajda	7	4	4
(United States) R Opelka	6^{6}	6	7^{7}
(Portugal) N Borges	7^{8}	2	6^{5}
(Canada) D Shapovalov	5	3
(Netherlands) B van de Zandschulp	7	6

Second round
11	(Norway) C Ruud	4	6^{7}
(United States) E Quinn	6	7^{9}
WC	(France) M Kouamé	2	5
21	(Czech Republic) J Lehečka	6	7
25	(United Kingdom) J Draper	6^{3}	6^{0}
(United States) R Opelka	7^{7}	7^{7}
(Netherlands) B van de Zandschulp	3	7^{7}	3
6	(United States) T Fritz	6	6^{2}	6

Third round
(United States) E Quinn	3	6^{6}
21	(Czech Republic) J Lehečka	6	7^{8}
(United States) R Opelka	3	4
6	(United States) T Fritz	6	6

Fourth round
21	(Czech Republic) J Lehečka	6	6^{4}	6
6	(United States) T Fritz	4	7^{7}	2

==== Section 3 ====
First round
Q	(Spain) R Jódar	6	4	6
Q	(Germany) Y Hanfmann	4	6	1
(Belgium) Z Bergs	7	6
(United States) J Brooksby	5	2
PR	(China) Z Zhang	3	2
(France) A Mannarino	6	6
(Belgium) R Collignon	7^{7}	4	7^{8}
(Bulgaria) G Dimitrov	6^{3}	6	6^{6}

Second round
LL	(Australia) A Vukic	1	2
Q	(Spain) R Jódar	6	6
(Belgium) Z Bergs	6^{5}	6^{3}
29	(Argentina) TM Etcheverry	7^{7}	7^{7}
22	(United States) T Paul	6	2	6
(France) A Mannarino	2	6	4
(Belgium) R Collignon	7	6
13	(Italy) F Cobolli	5	3

Third round
Q	(Spain) R Jódar	5	4
29	(Argentina) TM Etcheverry	7	6
22	(United States) T Paul	6	3	7^{7}
(Belgium) R Collignon	2	6	6^{5}

Fourth round
29	(Argentina) TM Etcheverry	1	3
22	(United States) T Paul	6	6

==== Section 4 ====
First round
(France) A Müller	4	2
(Italy) M Berrettini	6	6
Q	(Georgia (country)) N Basilashvili	6^{7}	3
(Argentina) M Navone	7^{9}	6
WC	(United States) Dar Blanch	6	3	6
(Germany) J-L Struff	3	6	3
(Greece) S Tsitsipas	6	7^{7}
Q	(United Kingdom) A Fery	1	6^{4}

Second round
10	(Kazakhstan) A Bublik	4	4
(Italy) M Berrettini	6	6
(Argentina) M Navone	3	4
24	(Monaco) V Vacherot	6	6
28	(France) A Fils	6	6
WC	(United States) Dar Blanch	2	3
(Greece) S Tsitsipas	6	7^{7}
5	(Australia) A de Minaur	3	6^{3}

Third round
(Italy) M Berrettini	6^{5}	4
24	(Monaco) V Vacherot	7^{7}	6
28	(France) A Fils	6	6
(Greece) S Tsitsipas	0	1

Fourth round
24	(Monaco) V Vacherot	4	7^{7}	4
28	(France) A Fils	6	6^{4}	6

=== Bottom half ===
==== Section 5 ====
First round
(Italy) M Arnaldi	6^{5}	7^{7}	2
(Kazakhstan) A Shevchenko	7^{7}	6^{5}	6
(Canada) G Diallo	6	7^{7}
WC	(China) Y Wu	2	6^{3}
(France) V Royer	5	7^{11}	6^{5}
LL	(Argentina) TA Tirante	7	6^{9}	7^{7}
(United States) A Kovacevic	4	6	6^{7}
WC	(Japan) R Sakamoto	6	3	7^{9}

Second round
8	(United States) B Shelton	7^{7}	6^{3}	3
(Kazakhstan) A Shevchenko	6^{3}	7^{7}	6
(Canada) G Diallo	1	4
31	(France) U Humbert	6	6
18	(Argentina) F Cerúndolo	6	6
LL	(Argentina) TA Tirante	4	2
WC	(Japan) R Sakamoto	7^{12}	3	1
9	D Medvedev	6^{10}	6	6

Third round
(Kazakhstan) A Shevchenko	4	6^{2}
31	(France) U Humbert	6	7^{7}
18	(Argentina) F Cerúndolo	6	4	7
9	D Medvedev	0	6	5

Fourth round
31	(France) U Humbert	4	3
18	(Argentina) F Cerúndolo	6	6

==== Section 6 ====
First round
(France) Q Halys	6^{4}	6	6
Q	(Canada) L Draxl	7^{7}	1	1
(Poland) K Majchrzak	4	6	6
(Serbia) M Kecmanović	6	3	1
(Croatia) M Čilić	6	6
(Australia) A Popyrin	4	4
WC	(United States) M Damm	6	0
(United Kingdom) J Fearnley	0	0^{r}

Second round
16	(Spain) A Davidovich Fokina	6^{8}	4
(France) Q Halys	7^{10}	6
(Poland) K Majchrzak	6	4	6
20	(United States) L Tien	2	6	2
27	(United States) B Nakashima	6	4	6^{7}
(Croatia) M Čilić	2	6	7^{9}
WC	(United States) M Damm	2	4
3	(Germany) A Zverev	6	6

Third round
(France) Q Halys	7^{7}	6
(Poland) K Majchrzak	6^{4}	1
(Croatia) M Čilić	2	7	4
3	(Germany) A Zverev	6	5	6

Fourth round
(France) Q Halys	6^{4}	6^{1}
3	(Germany) A Zverev	7^{7}	7^{7}

==== Section 7 ====
First round
Q	(Australia) C O'Connell	6^{6}	3
(Hungary) M Fucsovics	7^{8}	6
(France) T Atmane	6	6
(Germany) D Altmaier	4	2
(France) A Cazaux	7	6
Q	(Chile) T Barrios Vera	5	4
Q	(Australia) A Walton	6	6
(Argentina) S Báez	2	2

Second round
7	(Canada) F Auger-Aliassime	7^{7}	7
(Hungary) M Fucsovics	6^{3}	5
(France) T Atmane	7^{7}	6
26	(France) A Rinderknech	6^{4}	3
19	(United States) F Tiafoe	7^{7}	6
(France) A Cazaux	6^{1}	1
Q	(Australia) A Walton	6	2	4
12	(Czech Republic) J Menšík	3	6	6

Third round
7	(Canada) F Auger-Aliassime	3	6	3
(France) T Atmane	6	1	6
19	(United States) F Tiafoe	7^{7}	4	7^{13}
12	(Czech Republic) J Menšík	6^{4}	6	6^{11}

Fourth round
(France) T Atmane	4	6	4
19	(United States) F Tiafoe	6	1	6

==== Section 8 ====
First round
(Chile) A Tabilo	6	6
(Argentina) F Comesaña	4	2
(United States) A Michelsen	6	6
Q	(Italy) M Bellucci	2	1
(United States) E Nava	6	4	1
(Czech Republic) T Macháč	2	6	6
Q	(Peru) I Buse	7^{8}	6^{6}	1
(Bosnia and Herzegovina) D Džumhur	6^{6}	7^{8}	6

Second round
15	A Rublev	7^{7}	2	4
(Chile) A Tabilo	6^{5}	6	6
(United States) A Michelsen	7	6^{4}	6
23	(United Kingdom) C Norrie	5	7^{7}	4
30	(France) C Moutet	6	1	6
(Czech Republic) T Macháč	0	6	4
(Bosnia and Herzegovina) D Džumhur	3	3
2	(Italy) J Sinner	6	6

Third round
(Chile) A Tabilo	6	3	4
(United States) A Michelsen	3	6	6
30	(France) C Moutet	1	4
2	(Italy) J Sinner	6	6

Fourth round
(United States) A Michelsen	5	6^{4}
2	(Italy) J Sinner	7	7^{7}

== Seeded players ==
The following are the seeded players. Seedings are based on ATP rankings as of March 16, 2026. Rankings and points before are as of March 16, 2026

^{‡}	Champion
^{†}	Runner-up

Seed	Rank	Player	Points before	Points defending	Points won	Points after	Status
1	1	(Spain) Carlos Alcaraz	13,550	10	50	13,590	Third round lost to (United States) Sebastian Korda [32]
2	2	(Italy) Jannik Sinner^{‡}	11,400	0	1,000	12,400	Champion, defeated (Czech Republic) Jiří Lehečka [21]
3	4	(Germany) Alexander Zverev	4,905	100	400	5,205	Semifinals lost to (Italy) Jannik Sinner [2]
~~4~~	~~5~~	~~(Italy) Lorenzo Musetti~~	4,365	100	0	4,265	Withdrew due to right arm injury
5	6	(Australia) Alex de Minaur	4,185	100	10	4,095	Second round lost to (Greece) Stefanos Tsitsipas
6	7	(United States) Taylor Fritz	4,170	400	100	3,870	Fourth round lost to (Czech Republic) Jiří Lehečka [21]
7	8	(Canada) Félix Auger-Aliassime	4,000	50	50	4,000	Third round lost to (France) Térence Atmane
8	9	(United States) Ben Shelton	3,860	10	10	3,860	Second round lost to (Kazakhstan) Alexander Shevchenko
9	10	Daniil Medvedev	3,610	(50)^{∆}	50	3,610	Third round lost to (Argentina) Francisco Cerúndolo [18]
10	11	(Kazakhstan) Alexander Bublik	3,385	(50)^{∆}	10	3,345	Second round lost to (Italy) Matteo Berrettini
11	12	(Norway) Casper Ruud	2,715	100	10	2,625	Second round lost to (United States) Ethan Quinn
12	13	(Czech Republic) Jakub Menšík	2,650	1,000	50	1,700	Third round lost to (United States) Frances Tiafoe [19]
13	14	(Italy) Flavio Cobolli	2,520	10	10	2,520	Second round lost to (Belgium) Raphaël Collignon
14	15	Karen Khachanov	2,410	50	50	2,410	Third round lost to (Spain) Martín Landaluce [Q]
15	16	Andrey Rublev	2,400	10	10	2,400	Second round lost to (Chile) Alejandro Tabilo
16	17	(Spain) Alejandro Davidovich Fokina	2,260	(50)^{∆}	10	2,220	Second round lost to (France) Quentin Halys
17	18	(Italy) Luciano Darderi	2,084	30+64^{Ω}	10+50	2,050	Second round lost to (Spain) Martín Landaluce [Q]
18	19	(Argentina) Francisco Cerúndolo	2,020	200	200	2,020	Quarterfinals lost to (Germany) Alexander Zverev [3]
19	20	(United States) Frances Tiafoe	1,920	50	200	2,070	Quarterfinals lost to (Italy) Jannik Sinner [2]
20	21	(United States) Learner Tien	1,860	(25)^{∆}	10	1,845	Second round lost to (Poland) Kamil Majchrzak
21	22	(Czech Republic) Jiří Lehečka^{†}	1,850	10	650	2,490	Runner-up, lost to (Italy) Jannik Sinner [2]
22	23	(United States) Tommy Paul	1,765	50	200	1,915	Quarterfinals lost to (France) Arthur Fils [28]
23	24	(United Kingdom) Cameron Norrie	1,753	10	10	1,753	Second round lost to (United States) Alex Michelsen
24	25	(Monaco) Valentin Vacherot	1,741	(10)^{Ω}	100	1,831	Fourth round lost to (France) Arthur Fils [28]
25	26	(United Kingdom) Jack Draper	1,710	10	10	1,710	Second round lost to (United States) Reilly Opelka
26	27	(France) Arthur Rinderknech	1,657	(16)^{∆}	10	1,651	Second round lost to (France) Térence Atmane
27	30	(United States) Brandon Nakashima	1,485	100	10	1,395	Second round lost to (Croatia) Marin Čilić
28	31	(France) Arthur Fils	1,440	200	400	1,640	Semifinals lost to (Czech Republic) Jiří Lehečka [21]
29	32	(Argentina) Tomás Martín Etcheverry	1,430	(30)^{∆}	100	1,500	Fourth round lost to (United States) Tommy Paul [22]
30	33	(France) Corentin Moutet	1,383	30	50	1,403	Third round lost to (Italy) Jannik Sinner [2]
31	34	(France) Ugo Humbert	1,245	(25)^{∆}	100	1,320	Fourth round lost to (Argentina) Francisco Cerúndolo [18]
32	36	(United States) Sebastian Korda	1,200	200	100	1,100	Fourth round lost to (Spain) Martín Landaluce [Q]

∆ The player is defending points from his 18th best tournament.
Ω The player is defending points from an ATP Challenger Tour event.

=== Withdrawn seeded players ===
The following players would have been seeded, but withdrew before the tournament began.

Rank	Player	Points before	Points defending	Points after	Withdrawal reason
3	(Serbia) Novak Djokovic	5,370	650	4,720	Shoulder injury
28	(Denmark) Holger Rune	1,640	10	1,630	Left achilles tendon injury
29	(Netherlands) Tallon Griekspoor	1,585	0	1,585	Left hamstring injury
35	(Spain) Jaume Munar	1,225	50	1,175	Right arm injury

== Other entry information ==
=== Wildcards ===
- (United States) Darwin Blanch
- (United States) Martin Damm
- (France) Moïse Kouamé
- (Japan) Rei Sakamoto
- (China) Wu Yibing

=== Protected ranking ===
- (China) Zhang Zhizhen

=== Withdrawals ===
- † (Argentina) Juan Manuel Cerúndolo → replaced by (Argentina) Thiago Agustín Tirante (LL)
- ‡ (Serbia) Novak Djokovic → replaced by (United Kingdom) Jacob Fearnley
- ‡ (Netherlands) Tallon Griekspoor → replaced by (Spain) Roberto Bautista Agut
- † (Italy) Lorenzo Musetti → replaced by (Australia) Aleksandar Vukic (LL)
- ‡ (Spain) Jaume Munar → replaced by (Kazakhstan) Alexander Shevchenko
- ‡ (Denmark) Holger Rune → replaced by (Argentina) Juan Manuel Cerúndolo
- ‡ (China) Shang Juncheng → replaced by (Australia) James Duckworth
- ‡ (Italy) Lorenzo Sonego → replaced by (Serbia) Miomir Kecmanović

‡ – withdrew from entry list
† – withdrew from main draw

== Qualifying ==
=== Seeds ===
1. (Peru) Ignacio Buse (qualified)
2. (Germany) Yannick Hanfmann (qualified)
3. (Argentina) Thiago Agustín Tirante (qualifying competition, lucky loser)
4. (Australia) Aleksandar Vukic (qualifying competition, lucky loser)
5. (Chile) Cristian Garín (first round)
6. (Australia) Adam Walton (qualified)
7. (Italy) Mattia Bellucci (qualified)
8. (United States) Patrick Kypson (first round)
9. (Belgium) Alexander Blockx (qualifying competition)
10. (Argentina) Román Andrés Burruchaga (first round)
11. (United States) Zachary Svajda (qualified)
12. (Spain) Rafael Jódar (qualified)
13. (France) Luca Van Assche (qualifying competition)
14. (Czech Republic) Dalibor Svrčina (first round)
15. (France) Benjamin Bonzi (qualifying competition)
16. (Japan) Sho Shimabukuro (qualifying competition)
17. (Italy) Francesco Maestrelli (first round)
18. (Chile) Tomás Barrios Vera (qualified)
19. (Australia) Rinky Hijikata (qualifying competition)
20. (Australia) Tristan Schoolkate (first round)
21. (Hong Kong) Coleman Wong (qualifying competition)
22. (United States) Mackenzie McDonald (first round)
23. (Australia) Christopher O'Connell (qualified)
24. (Japan) Shintaro Mochizuki (first round)

=== Qualifiers ===
1. (Peru) Ignacio Buse
2. (Germany) Yannick Hanfmann
3. (Spain) Martín Landaluce
4. (Chile) Tomás Barrios Vera
5. (Canada) Liam Draxl
6. (Australia) Adam Walton
7. (Italy) Mattia Bellucci
8. (Georgia (country)) Nikoloz Basilashvili
9. (Australia) Christopher O'Connell
10. (United Kingdom) Arthur Fery
11. (United States) Zachary Svajda
12. (Spain) Rafael Jódar

=== Lucky losers ===
1. (Argentina) Thiago Agustín Tirante
2. (Australia) Aleksandar Vukic

=== Qualifying draw ===
==== First qualifier ====
First round
1	(Peru) Ignacio Buse	6	6^{4}	6
(Tunisia) Moez Echargui	3	7^{7}	4
(United Kingdom) Jack Pinnington Jones	7	6^{4}	4
21	(Hong Kong) Coleman Wong	5	7^{7}	6

Qualifying competition
1	(Peru) Ignacio Buse	6	3	6
21	(Hong Kong) Coleman Wong	2	6	3

==== Second qualifier ====
First round
2	(Germany) Yannick Hanfmann	6	6
(Switzerland) Leandro Riedi	3	4
WC	(United States) Benjamin Willwerth	3	1
13	(France) Luca Van Assche	6	6

Qualifying competition
2	(Germany) Yannick Hanfmann	6	5	6
13	(France) Luca Van Assche	1	7	3

==== Third qualifier ====
First round
3	(Argentina) Thiago Agustín Tirante	6	6
WC	(Germany) Diego Dedura	2	3
(Spain) Martín Landaluce	6	6
22	(United States) Mackenzie McDonald	3	4

Qualifying competition
3	(Argentina) Thiago Agustín Tirante	6	5	4
(Spain) Martín Landaluce	3	7	6

==== Fourth qualifier ====
First round
4	(Australia) Aleksandar Vukic	7^{7}	6
(United Kingdom) Billy Harris	6^{3}	4
(United States) Nishesh Basavareddy	3	2
18	(Chile) Tomás Barrios Vera	6	6

Qualifying competition
4	(Australia) Aleksandar Vukic	3	6^{5}
18	(Chile) Tomás Barrios Vera	6	7^{7}

==== Fifth qualifier ====
First round
5/WC	(Chile) Cristian Garín	6	4	2
(Canada) Liam Draxl	4	6	6
(United Kingdom) Jay Clarke	6	3	6
24	(Japan) Shintaro Mochizuki	4	6	1

Qualifying competition
(Canada) Liam Draxl	6	3	6
(United Kingdom) Jay Clarke	3	6	4

==== Sixth qualifier ====
First round
6	(Australia) Adam Walton	6	6
(Luxembourg) Chris Rodesch	2	4
(Australia) Dane Sweeny	3	2
19	(Australia) Rinky Hijikata	6	6

Qualifying competition
6	(Australia) Adam Walton	6	6^{2}	6
19	(Australia) Rinky Hijikata	3	7^{7}	1

==== Seventh qualifier ====
First round
7	(Italy) Mattia Bellucci	6	6
(Chile) Nicolás Jarry	3	1
Alt	(United States) Murphy Cassone	7^{7}	6
17	(Italy) Francesco Maestrelli	6^{1}	4

Qualifying competition
7	(Italy) Mattia Bellucci	3	7^{7}	6
Alt	(United States) Murphy Cassone	6	6^{5}	3

==== Eighth qualifier ====
First round
8	(United States) Patrick Kypson	3	1
(Georgia (country)) Nikoloz Basilashvili	6	6
(Australia) Alex Bolt	2	7^{7}	3
16	(Japan) Sho Shimabukuro	6	6^{3}	6

Qualifying competition
(Georgia (country)) Nikoloz Basilashvili	6	6
16	(Japan) Sho Shimabukuro	2	1

==== Ninth qualifier ====
First round
9	(Belgium) Alexander Blockx	7^{7}	6
(Chinese Taipei) Tseng Chun-hsin	6^{5}	3
(Colombia) Nicolás Mejía	6^{4}	3
23	(Australia) Christopher O'Connell	7^{7}	6

Qualifying competition
9	(Belgium) Alexander Blockx	6	4	4
23	(Australia) Christopher O'Connell	4	6	6

==== Tenth qualifier ====
First round
10	(Argentina) Román Andrés Burruchaga	6	4	4
(United Kingdom) Arthur Fery	2	6	6
(China) Bu Yunchaokete	7	6
20	(Australia) Tristan Schoolkate	5	4

Qualifying competition
(United Kingdom) Arthur Fery	6	3	7
(China) Bu Yunchaokete	3	6	5

==== Eleventh qualifier ====
First round
11	(United States) Zachary Svajda	6^{6}	6	6
(United States) Colton Smith	7^{8}	3	1
(Spain) Daniel Mérida	6^{1}	6	7^{8}
14	(Czech Republic) Dalibor Svrčina	7^{7}	4	6^{6}

Qualifying competition
11	(United States) Zachary Svajda	6	6^{2}	6
(Spain) Daniel Mérida	0	7^{7}	2

==== Twelfth qualifier ====
First round
12	(Spain) Rafael Jódar	6	7^{7}
WC	(India) Manas Dhamne	3	6^{4}
WC	(Brazil) Guto Miguel	2	6^{6}
15	(France) Benjamin Bonzi	6	7^{8}

Qualifying competition
12	(Spain) Rafael Jódar	6	6
15	(France) Benjamin Bonzi	4	4
