= 2026 Miami Open – Women's doubles =

Women's doubles
- 2026 Miami Open

Final
- Champions: (Czech Republic) Kateřina Siniaková (United States) Taylor Townsend
- Runners-up: (Italy) Sara Errani (Italy) Jasmine Paolini
- Score: 7–6^{(7–0)}, 6–1

Events
Singles	men	women
Doubles	men	women
WC Singles	men	women
WC Doubles	men	women
- Miami Open

Kateřina Siniaková and Taylor Townsend defeated Sara Errani and Jasmine Paolini in the final, 7–6^{(7–0)}, 6–1 to win the women's doubles tennis title at the 2026 Miami Open. It was the eighth WTA 1000 title for Siniaková and fourth for Townsend. They completed the Sunshine Double (having won Indian Wells two weeks prior), becoming the sixth pair to accomplish the feat in women's doubles, and the first since Elise Mertens and Aryna Sabalenka in 2019.

Mirra Andreeva and Diana Shnaider were the reigning champions but did not participate together this year. Andreeva partnered Victoria Mboko, but the pair withdrew from their second-round match. Shnaider partnered Linda Nosková, but lost in the first round to Gabriela Dabrowski and Luisa Stefani.

For the first time in the history of the event, the top four seeds all advanced to the semifinals; this marked the first such occurrence at a WTA 1000 event since the 2017 China Open.

== Seeds ==
1. (Italy) Sara Errani / (Italy) Jasmine Paolini (final)
2. (Czech Republic) Kateřina Siniaková / (United States) Taylor Townsend (champions)
3. (Canada) Gabriela Dabrowski / (Brazil) Luisa Stefani (semifinals)
4. (Belgium) Elise Mertens / (China) Zhang Shuai (semifinals, retired)
5. (Kazakhstan) Anna Danilina / (Serbia) Aleksandra Krunić (first round)
6. (United States) Asia Muhammad / (New Zealand) Erin Routliffe (quarterfinals)
7. (Spain) Cristina Bucșa / (United States) Nicole Melichar-Martinez (withdrew)
8. (Australia) Ellen Perez / (Netherlands) Demi Schuurs (first round)

== Draw ==
Key

- Q = Qualifier
- WC = Wild card
- LL = Lucky loser
- Alt = Alternate
- ITF = ITF entry
- PR = Protected ranking
- SR = Special ranking
- SE = Special exempt
- JE = Junior exempt
- JR = Junior Accelerator Programme entrant
- CO = College Accelerator Programme entrant
- NG = Next Gen Accelerator Program entrant
- w/o = Walkover
- r = Retired
- d = Defaulted

=== Finals ===
Semifinals
1	(Italy) Sara Errani (Italy) Jasmine Paolini	2
4	(Belgium) Elise Mertens (China) Zhang Shuai	1^{r}
3	(Canada) Gabriela Dabrowski (Brazil) Luisa Stefani	6	4	[3]
2	(Czech Republic) Kateřina Siniaková (United States) Taylor Townsend	4	6	[10]

Final
1	(Italy) Sara Errani (Italy) Jasmine Paolini	6^{0}	1
2	(Czech Republic) Kateřina Siniaková (United States) Taylor Townsend	7^{7}	6

=== Top half ===
First round
1	(Italy) S Errani (Italy) J Paolini	6	6
(Japan) S Aoyama (Norway) U Eikeri	3	2
(Romania) S Cîrstea (Romania) J Cristian	1	5
(Slovakia) T Mihalíková (United Kingdom) O Nicholls	6	7
(Germany) L Siegemund; V Zvonareva	1	6	[7]
(Japan) M Kato (China) Z Yang	6	1	[10]
WC	(Canada) L Fernandez (United States) V Williams	6	3	[11]
6	(United States) A Muhammad (New Zealand) E Routliffe	3	6	[13]
4	(Belgium) E Mertens (China) S Zhang	6	6
(Chinese Taipei) H-c Chan (Indonesia) J Tjen	3	4
WC	(United States) J Brady (United States) C McNally	6	7^{7}
PR	(Croatia) D Jurak Schreiber (Mexico) G Olmos	4	6^{2}
(Australia) S Hunter (United States) J Pegula	6	6
(United States) A Li (Poland) M Linette	2	2
M Andreeva (Canada) V Mboko	7^{9}	6
8	(Australia) E Perez (Netherlands) D Schuurs	6^{7}	3

Second round
1	(Italy) S Errani (Italy) J Paolini	6	6
(Slovakia) T Mihalíková (United Kingdom) O Nicholls	4	4
(Japan) M Kato (China) Z Yang	2	1
6	(United States) A Muhammad (New Zealand) E Routliffe	6	6
4	(Belgium) E Mertens (China) S Zhang	6	7^{9}
WC	(United States) J Brady (United States) C McNally	3	6^{7}
(Australia) S Hunter (United States) J Pegula	w/o
M Andreeva (Canada) V Mboko

Quarterfinals
1	(Italy) S Errani (Italy) J Paolini	6	6
6	(United States) A Muhammad (New Zealand) E Routliffe	3	1
4	(Belgium) E Mertens (China) S Zhang	2	6	[14]
(Australia) S Hunter (United States) J Pegula	6	3	[12]

Semifinals
1	(Italy) S Errani (Italy) J Paolini	2
4	(Belgium) E Mertens (China) S Zhang	1^{r}

=== Bottom half ===
First round
Alt	(Italy) E Cocciaretto (Croatia) A Ružić	1	3
(United States) S Kenin; L Samsonova	6	6
PR	(Estonia) I Neel (Indonesia) A Sutjiadi	6	6^{4}	[10]
(United States) H Baptiste (United States) P Stearns	2	7^{7}	[6]
WC	(United States) A Parks (United States) S Stephens	2	2
E Alexandrova (Hungary) F Stollár	6	6
(Czech Republic) L Nosková; D Shnaider	3	1
3	(Canada) G Dabrowski (Brazil) L Stefani	6	6
5	(Kazakhstan) A Danilina (Serbia) A Krunić	6	4	[4]
(China) X Jiang (China) Y Xu	3	6	[10]
(Czech Republic) M Bouzková (Czech Republic) T Valentová	5	7^{7}	[10]
(Ukraine) L Kichenok (United States) D Krawczyk	7	6^{2}	[5]
(France) K Mladenovic (Latvia) J Ostapenko	4	7^{7}	[7]
(Japan) E Hozumi (Chinese Taipei) F-h Wu	6	6^{2}	[10]
A Panova (Uzbekistan) K Rakhimova	2	2
2	(Czech Republic) K Siniaková (United States) T Townsend	6	6

Second round
(United States) S Kenin; L Samsonova	6	4	[10]
PR	(Estonia) I Neel (Indonesia) A Sutjiadi	3	6	[6]
E Alexandrova (Hungary) F Stollár
3	(Canada) G Dabrowski (Brazil) L Stefani	w/o
(China) X Jiang (China) Y Xu	6	6
(Czech Republic) M Bouzková (Czech Republic) T Valentová	3	2
(Japan) E Hozumi (Chinese Taipei) F-h Wu	3	0
2	(Czech Republic) K Siniaková (United States) T Townsend	6	6

Quarterfinals
(United States) S Kenin; L Samsonova	6^{5}	4
3	(Canada) G Dabrowski (Brazil) L Stefani	7^{7}	6
(China) X Jiang (China) Y Xu	2	2
2	(Czech Republic) K Siniaková (United States) T Townsend	6	6

Semifinals
3	(Canada) G Dabrowski (Brazil) L Stefani	6	4	[3]
2	(Czech Republic) K Siniaková (United States) T Townsend	4	6	[10]

== Seeded teams ==
The following are the seeded teams. Seedings are based on WTA rankings as of March 2, 2026.

Country	Player	Country	Player	Rank	Seed
ITA	Sara Errani	ITA	Jasmine Paolini	8	1
CZE	Kateřina Siniaková	USA	Taylor Townsend	12	2
CAN	Gabriela Dabrowski	BRA	Luisa Stefani	12	3
BEL	Elise Mertens	CHN	Zhang Shuai	15	4
KAZ	Anna Danilina	SRB	Aleksandra Krunić	15	5
USA	Asia Muhammad	NZL	Erin Routliffe	31	6
ESP	Cristina Bucșa	USA	Nicole Melichar-Martinez	35	7
AUS	Ellen Perez	NED	Demi Schuurs	45	8

== Other entry information ==
=== Wildcards ===
- (United States) Jennifer Brady / (United States) Caty McNally
- (Canada) Leylah Fernandez / (United States) Venus Williams
- (United States) Alycia Parks / (United States) Sloane Stephens

=== Protected ranking ===
- (Croatia) Darija Jurak Schreiber / (Mexico) Giuliana Olmos
- (Estonia) Ingrid Neel / (Indonesia) Aldila Sutjiadi

=== Alternates ===
- (Italy) Elisabetta Cocciaretto / (Croatia) Antonia Ružić

=== Withdrawals ===
- (Spain) Cristina Bucșa / (United States) Nicole Melichar-Martinez → replaced by (Italy) Elisabetta Cocciaretto / (Croatia) Antonia Ružić
