= 2026 Miami Open – Wheelchair men's singles =

Wheelchair men's singles
- 2026 Miami Open

Final
- Champion: (United Kingdom) Alfie Hewett
- Runner-up: (Japan) Tokito Oda
- Score: 6–1, 6–4

Events
Singles	men	women
Doubles	men	women
WC Singles	men	women
WC Doubles	men	women
- Miami Open

Alfie Hewett won the men's singles events, defeating Tokito Oda in the final, 6–1, 6–4.

== Seeds ==
1. (Japan) Tokito Oda (final)
2. (Spain) Martin de la Puente (quarterfinal)

== Draw ==
Key

- Q = Qualifier
- WC = Wild card
- LL = Lucky loser
- Alt = Alternate
- ITF = ITF entry
- PR = Protected ranking
- SR = Special ranking
- SE = Special exempt
- JE = Junior exempt
- JR = Junior Accelerator Programme entrant
- CO = College Accelerator Programme entrant
- NG = Next Gen Accelerator Program entrant
- w/o = Walkover
- r = Retired
- d = Defaulted

=== Finals ===
Quarterfinals
1	(Japan) Tokito Oda	6	6
(United States) Charlie Cooper	2	1
(United Kingdom) Gordon Reid	6	6
(United States) Casey Ratzlaff	2	2
(United Kingdom) Alfie Hewett	6	6
(Spain) Daniel Caverzaschi	0	2
(Argentina) Gustavo Fernandez	6	3	6
2	(Spain) Martin de la Puente	0	6	3

Semifinals
1	(Japan) Tokito Oda	6	7
(United Kingdom) Gordon Reid	1	5
(United Kingdom) Alfie Hewett	6	6
(Argentina) Gustavo Fernandez	3	4

Final
1	(Japan) Tokito Oda	1	4
(United Kingdom) Alfie Hewett	6	6
