= 2026 Delray Beach Open =

- Date: February 16–22
- Edition: 34th
- Draw: 28S / 16D
- Surface: Hard
- Location: Delray Beach, United States
- Venue: Delray Beach Tennis Center

Champions

Singles
- (United States) Sebastian Korda

Doubles
- (United States) Austin Krajicek / (Croatia) Nikola Mektić
- Delray Beach Open

The 2026 Delray Beach Open was a professional men's tennis tournament played on hard courts. It was the 34th edition of the tournament and part of the ATP 250 tournaments of the 2026 ATP Tour. It took place in Delray Beach, United States between February 16 and February 22, 2026.

== Finals ==
=== Singles ===
- (United States) Sebastian Korda def. (United States) Tommy Paul, 6–4, 6–3

=== Doubles ===
- (United States) Austin Krajicek / (Croatia) Nikola Mektić def. (United States) Benjamin Kittay / (United States) Ryan Seggerman, 6–7^{(3–7)}, 6–3, [11–9]

== Singles main-draw entrants ==
=== Seeds ===
Country	Player	Rank^{1}	Seed
USA	Taylor Fritz	7	1
NOR	Casper Ruud	13	2
ITA	Flavio Cobolli	20	3
USA	Learner Tien	23	4
USA	Tommy Paul	24	5
MON	Valentin Vacherot	25	6
USA	Brandon Nakashima	29	7
USA	Frances Tiafoe	30	8

^{†} Rankings are as of February 9, 2026.

=== Other entrants ===
The following players received wildcards into the main draw:

- (United States) Patrick Kypson
- (United States) Mackenzie McDonald
- ~~(United States) Eliot Spizzirri~~

The following player received entry through the Next Gen Accelerator program:

- (Spain) Rafael Jódar

The following players received entry from the qualifying draw:

- (Australia) Rinky Hijikata
- (Japan) Sho Shimabukuro
- (United States) Zachary Svajda
- (Hong Kong) Coleman Wong

The following player received entry as a lucky loser:

- (Australia) Adam Walton

=== Withdrawals ===
- (United Kingdom) Cameron Norrie → replaced by (France) Térence Atmane
- (United States) Eliot Spizzirri → replaced by (Australia) Adam Walton (LL)

== Doubles main-draw entrants ==
=== Seeds ===
Country	Player	Country	Player	Rank^{1}	Seed
GBR	Luke Johnson	POL	Jan Zieliński	52	1
USA	Austin Krajicek	CRO	Nikola Mektić	68	2
USA	Robert Cash	USA	JJ Tracy	74	3
MEX	Santiago González	NED	David Pel	75	4

- ^{1} Rankings are as of February 9, 2026.

=== Other entrants ===
The following pairs received wildcards into the main draw:

- (United States) Trey Hilderbrand / (United States) Mac Kiger
- (United States) Benjamin Kittay / (United States) Ryan Seggerman

The following pair received entry as alternates:

- (Canada) Liam Draxl / (Antigua and Barbuda) Jody Maginley

=== Withdrawals ===
- (Australia) Rinky Hijikata / (Australia) Adam Walton → replaced by (Canada) Liam Draxl / (Antigua and Barbuda) Jody Maginley
