= 2026 Miami Open =

- Date: March 17–29
- Edition: 41st
- Category: ATP Masters 1000 (ATP); WTA 1000 (WTA); WT500 (ITF)
- Draw: 96S / 48Q / 32D
- Prize money: $9,415,725
- Surface: Hard – outdoor
- Location: Miami Gardens, Florida, United States
- Venue: Hard Rock Stadium

Champions

Men's singles
- (Italy) Jannik Sinner

Women's singles
- Aryna Sabalenka

Men's doubles
- (Italy) Simone Bolelli / (Italy) Andrea Vavassori

Women's doubles
- (Czech Republic) Kateřina Siniaková / (United States) Taylor Townsend

Wheelchair men's singles
- (United Kingdom) Alfie Hewett

Wheelchair women's singles
- (Netherlands) Aniek van Koot

Wheelchair men's doubles
- (United Kingdom) Alfie Hewett/ (United Kingdom) Gordon Reid

Wheelchair women's doubles
- (Colombia) Angélica Bernal / (China) Zhenzhen Zhu
- Miami Open

The 2026 Miami Open was a professional hardcourt tennis tournament that was played from March 17 to 29, 2026, on the grounds of Hard Rock Stadium in Miami Gardens, Florida. It was the 41st edition of the combined men's and women's event and is classified as an ATP Masters 1000 event on the 2026 ATP Tour and a WTA 1000 event on the 2026 WTA Tour.

For the first time ever it was also an ITF Wheelchair Tennis Tour tournament in the WT500 level for both men's and women's professional players in singles and doubles draws.

Jakub Menšík and Aryna Sabalenka were the defending champions in the men's and women's singles draw, respectively. Menšík failed to defend his title, losing in the third round to Frances Tiafoe. By defeating Coco Gauff in three sets at the final, Sabalenka defended her title and won the Sunshine Double, having won the Indian Wells Open singles title two weeks prior. Jannik Sinner completed the Sunshine Double without dropping a set by defeating Jiří Lehečka in the final. Sabalenka and Sinner were the first pair of singles players to simultaneously complete the Sunshine Double since Novak Djokovic and Victoria Azarenka did so in 2016. The doubles pair of Kateřina Siniaková and Taylor Townsend also won the Sunshine Double, third instance of achieving the feat in the same year.

== Champions ==
=== Men's singles ===
- (Italy) Jannik Sinner defeated (Czech Republic) Jiří Lehečka, 6–4, 6–4

=== Women's singles ===
- Aryna Sabalenka defeated (United States) Coco Gauff, 6–2, 4–6, 6–3

=== Men's doubles ===
- (Italy) Simone Bolelli / (Italy) Andrea Vavassori defeated (Finland) Harri Heliövaara / (United Kingdom) Henry Patten, 6–4, 6–2

=== Women's doubles ===
- (Czech Republic) Kateřina Siniaková / (United States) Taylor Townsend defeated (Italy) Sara Errani / (Italy) Jasmine Paolini, 7–6^{(7–0)}, 6–1

=== Wheelchair men's singles ===
- (United Kingdom) Alfie Hewett defeated (Japan) Tokito Oda, 6–1, 6–1

=== Wheelchair women's singles ===
- (Netherlands) Aniek van Koot defeated (Netherlands) Lizzy de Greef, 3–6, 6–4, 6–4

=== Wheelchair men's doubles ===
- (United Kingdom) Alfie Hewett/ (United Kingdom) Gordon Reid defeated (Spain) Daniel Caverzaschi/ (Spain) Martín de la Puente, 6–2, 6–0

=== Wheelchair women's doubles ===
- (Colombia) Angélica Bernal / (China) Zhenzhen Zhu defeated (France) Ksénia Chasteau / (Netherlands) Lizzy de Greef, 6–1, 5–7, [10–4]

== Points and prize money ==
=== Point distribution ===
| Event | W | F | SF | QF | R16 | R32 | R64 | R128 | Q | Q2 | Q1 |
| Men's singles | 1000 | 650 | 400 | 200 | 100 | 50 | 30* | 10** | 20 | 10 | 0 |
| Men's doubles | 1000 | 600 | 360 | 180 | 90 | 0 | —N/a | —N/a | —N/a | —N/a | —N/a |
| Women's singles | 1000 | 650 | 390 | 215 | 120 | 65 | 35* | 10 | 30 | 20 | 2 |
| Women's doubles | 1000 | 650 | 390 | 215 | 120 | 10 | —N/a | —N/a | —N/a | —N/a | —N/a |

* Players with byes receive first-round points.
** Singles players with wild cards earn 0 points.

=== Prize money ===
| Event | W | F | SF | QF | R16 | R32 | R64 | R128 | Q2 | Q1 |
|---|---|---|---|---|---|---|---|---|---|---|
| Men's singles | $1,151,380 | $612,340 | $340,190 | $193,645 | $105,720 | $61,865 | $36,110 | $24,335 | $14,130 | $7,330 |
| Women's singles | $1,151,380 | $612,340 | $340,190 | $193,645 | $105,720 | $61,865 | $36,110 | $24,335 | $14,130 | $7,330 |
| Men's doubles* | $468,200 | $247,870 | $133,110 | $66,570 | $35,700 | $19,510 | —N/a | —N/a | —N/a | —N/a |
| Women's doubles* | $468,200 | $247,870 | $133,110 | $66,570 | $35,700 | $19,510 | —N/a | —N/a | —N/a | —N/a |

*per team

== See also ==
- 2026 ATP Tour
- 2026 WTA Tour
- ATP Tour Masters 1000
- WTA 1000 tournaments
- ITF Wheelchair Tennis Tour
