= 2026 Miami Open – Women's singles =

Tennis tournament event

Women's singles
- 2026 Miami Open

Final
- Champion: Aryna Sabalenka
- Runner-up: (United States) Coco Gauff
- Score: 6–2, 4–6, 6–3

Details
- Draw: 96
- Seeds: 32

Events
Singles	men	women
Doubles	men	women
WC Singles	men	women
WC Doubles	men	women
- Miami Open

Defending champion Aryna Sabalenka defeated Coco Gauff in the final, 6–2, 4–6, 6–3 to win the women's singles tennis title at the 2026 Miami Open. It was her eleventh WTA 1000 title, and she became the fifth woman to win the Sunshine Double (having won Indian Wells two weeks prior). Sabalenka also became the first player to win the Sunshine Double in both singles and doubles (having previously achieved the latter in 2019).

The semifinal between Sabalenka and Elena Rybakina marked the first time since the 1998 US Open semifinal between Martina Hingis and Jana Novotná in which the world No. 1 and No. 2 faced off before a tournament final outside of the WTA Finals, as well as the third such instance overall after the 1996 French Open.

Sloane Stephens's (world No. 717) win over Jennifer Brady (world No. 744) in the first round was the first WTA 1000 main-draw match between two players both ranked outside the world's top 500.

Iga Świątek's defeat in the second round to Magda Linette ended her streak of 73 consecutive opening round wins, dating back to the 2021 WTA Finals.

== Seeds ==
All seeds received a bye into the second round.

1. Aryna Sabalenka (champion)
2. (Poland) Iga Świątek (second round)
3. (Kazakhstan) Elena Rybakina (semifinals)
4. (United States) Coco Gauff (final)
5. (United States) Jessica Pegula (quarterfinals)
6. (United States) Amanda Anisimova (fourth round)
7. (Italy) Jasmine Paolini (third round)
8. Mirra Andreeva (fourth round)
9. (Ukraine) Elina Svitolina (third round)
10. (Canada) Victoria Mboko (quarterfinals)
11. Ekaterina Alexandrova (third round)
12. (Switzerland) Belinda Bencic (quarterfinals)
13. (Czech Republic) Karolína Muchová (semifinals)
14. (Czech Republic) Linda Nosková (second round)
15. (United States) Madison Keys (third round)
16. (Japan) Naomi Osaka (second round)
17. (Denmark) Clara Tauson (second round, retired)
18. (United States) Iva Jovic (third round)
19. Liudmila Samsonova (second round)
20. Diana Shnaider (third round)
21. (Belgium) Elise Mertens (third round)
22. Anna Kalinskaya (second round)
23. (China) Zheng Qinwen (fourth round)
24. (United Kingdom) Emma Raducanu (withdrew)
25. (Latvia) Jeļena Ostapenko (fourth round)
26. (Canada) Leylah Fernandez (third round)
27. (Ukraine) Marta Kostyuk (third round)
28. (Australia) Maya Joint (withdrew)
29. (China) Wang Xinyu (second round)
30. (Spain) Cristina Bucșa (second round, retired)
31. (Philippines) Alexandra Eala (fourth round)
32. (Czech Republic) Marie Bouzková (third round)
33. (Greece) Maria Sakkari (second round)
34. (Romania) Jaqueline Cristian (fourth round)

Click on the seed number of a player to go to their draw section.

== Draw ==
Key

- Q = Qualifier
- WC = Wild card
- LL = Lucky loser
- Alt = Alternate
- ITF = ITF entry
- PR = Protected ranking
- SR = Special ranking
- SE = Special exempt
- JE = Junior exempt
- JR = Junior Accelerator Programme entrant
- CO = College Accelerator Programme entrant
- NG = Next Gen Accelerator Program entrant
- w/o = Walkover
- r = Retired
- d = Defaulted

=== Finals ===
Quarterfinals
1	Aryna Sabalenka	6	6
(United States) Hailey Baptiste	4	4
3	(Kazakhstan) Elena Rybakina	2	6	6
5	(United States) Jessica Pegula	6	3	4
12	(Switzerland) Belinda Bencic	3	6	3
4	(United States) Coco Gauff	6	1	6
10	(Canada) Victoria Mboko	5	6^{5}
13	(Czech Republic) Karolína Muchová	7	7^{7}

Semifinals
1	Aryna Sabalenka	6	6
3	(Kazakhstan) Elena Rybakina	4	3
4	(United States) Coco Gauff	6	6
13	(Czech Republic) Karolína Muchová	1	1

Final
1	Aryna Sabalenka	6	4	6
4	(United States) Coco Gauff	2	6	3

=== Top half ===
==== Section 1 ====
First round
(United States) A Li	6	2	6
Q	(Australia) K Birrell	2	6	3
(United States) C McNally	6	7
Q	(Switzerland) R Masarova	2	5
WC	(United States) J Brady	4	2
WC	(United States) S Stephens	6	6
(Romania) E-G Ruse	7	7^{7}
(Croatia) A Ružić	5	6^{3}

Second round
1	A Sabalenka	7^{7}	6
(United States) A Li	6^{5}	4
(United States) C McNally	6	1	6
29	(China) Xin Wang	4	6	0
23	(China) Q Zheng	6	6
WC	(United States) S Stephens	3	2
(Romania) E-G Ruse	0	3
15	(United States) M Keys	6	6

Third round
1	A Sabalenka	6	6
(United States) C McNally	4	2
23	(China) Q Zheng	4	6	6
15	(United States) M Keys	6	2	4

Fourth round
1	A Sabalenka	6	6
23	(China) Q Zheng	3	4

==== Section 2 ====
First round
WC	(Australia) E Jones	3	7^{7}	7^{7}
Q	(Czech Republic) L Fruhvirtová	6	6^{3}	6^{4}
(United States) H Baptiste	7	6
(Germany) T Maria	5	2
(Ukraine) D Yastremska	2	6	7
WC	(United States) A Krueger	6	4	5
Q	(New Zealand) L Sun	6^{5}	3
WC	(United States) T Townsend	7^{7}	6

Second round
9	(Ukraine) E Svitolina	6	6
WC	(Australia) E Jones	2	4
(United States) H Baptiste	6	7
19	L Samsonova	3	5
25	(Latvia) J Ostapenko	6	6
(Ukraine) D Yastremska	4	4
WC	(United States) T Townsend	3	6	2
7	(Italy) J Paolini	6	1	6

Third round
9	(Ukraine) E Svitolina	3	5
(United States) H Baptiste	6	7
25	(Latvia) J Ostapenko	5	6	7
7	(Italy) J Paolini	7	2	5

Fourth round
(United States) H Baptiste	6	6
25	(Latvia) J Ostapenko	3	4

==== Section 3 ====
First round
(Indonesia) J Tjen	6	3	4
(Kazakhstan) Y Putintseva	3	6	6
(Argentina) S Sierra	1	3
LL	(Uzbekistan) K Rakhimova	6	6
(Spain) P Badosa	7	6
Q	A Sasnovich	5	3
(Czech Republic) S Bejlek	1	0
Q	(Australia) T Gibson	6	6

Second round
3	(Kazakhstan) E Rybakina	6	6
(Kazakhstan) Y Putintseva	3	3
LL	(Uzbekistan) K Rakhimova	2	4
27	(Ukraine) M Kostyuk	6	6
18	(United States) I Jovic	6	6
(Spain) P Badosa	2	1
Q	(Australia) T Gibson	7	6
16	(Japan) N Osaka	5	4

Third round
3	(Kazakhstan) E Rybakina	6	6
27	(Ukraine) M Kostyuk	3	4
18	(United States) I Jovic	2	2
Q	(Australia) T Gibson	6	6

Fourth round
3	(Kazakhstan) E Rybakina	6	6
Q	(Australia) T Gibson	2	2

==== Section 4 ====
First round
WC	(Austria) L Tagger	6^{8}	6	7
LL	(Germany) E Seidel	7^{10}	4	5
Q	(Switzerland) V Golubic	6^{6}	4
(United States) P Stearns	7^{8}	6
(Colombia) E Arango	3	6	3
O Selekhmeteva	6	4	6
(United Kingdom) F Jones	7	7
WC	(United States) V Williams	5	5

Second round
11	E Alexandrova	6	6
WC	(Austria) L Tagger	3	3
(United States) P Stearns	4	5
34	(Romania) J Cristian	6	7
26	(Canada) L Fernandez	7^{7}	3	6
O Selekhmeteva	6^{1}	6	1
(United Kingdom) F Jones	1	0^{r}
5	(United States) J Pegula	6	3

Third round
11	E Alexandrova	3	6	6^{5}
34	(Romania) J Cristian	6	4	7^{7}
26	(Canada) L Fernandez	2	2
5	(United States) J Pegula	6	6

Fourth round
34	(Romania) J Cristian	4	1
5	(United States) J Pegula	6	6

=== Bottom half ===
==== Section 5 ====
First round
(Switzerland) S Waltert	3	4
(Australia) A Tomljanović	6	6
(Germany) E Lys	1	4
Q	(Ukraine) Y Starodubtseva	6	6
(Czech Republic) T Valentová	6	6
Q	(United States) K Volynets	2	4
(Turkey) Z Sönmez	6	6
(Brazil) B Haddad Maia	3	2

Second round
6	(United States) A Anisimova	6	5	6
(Australia) A Tomljanović	1	7	4
Q	(Ukraine) Y Starodubtseva	6	3
30	(Spain) C Bucșa	2	2^{r}
20	D Shnaider	7^{9}	7^{7}
(Czech Republic) T Valentová	6^{7}	6^{3}
(Turkey) Z Sönmez	3	2
12	(Switzerland) B Bencic	6	6

Third round
6	(United States) A Anisimova	6	6
Q	(Ukraine) Y Starodubtseva	4	2
20	D Shnaider	3	3
12	(Switzerland) B Bencic	6	6

Fourth round
6	(United States) A Anisimova	2	2
12	(Switzerland) B Bencic	6	6

==== Section 6 ====
First round
(China) S Zhang	3	4
(Romania) S Cîrstea	6	6
Alt	(Hungary) D Gálfi	3	7^{7}	6^{5}
Q	(United States) E Kalieva	6	6^{5}	7^{7}
(United States) A Parks	7	7^{7}
Q	(Austria) S Kraus	5	6^{4}
LL	(Latvia) D Semeņistaja	4	1
(Italy) E Cocciaretto	6	6

Second round
14	(Czech Republic) L Nosková	2	6	4
(Romania) S Cîrstea	6	3	6
Q	(United States) E Kalieva	2	0
21	(Belgium) E Mertens	6	6
33	(Greece) M Sakkari	3	3
(United States) A Parks	6	6
(Italy) E Cocciaretto	6	4	3
4	(United States) C Gauff	3	6	6

Third round
(Romania) S Cîrstea	6	6
21	(Belgium) E Mertens	3	2
(United States) A Parks	6	0	1
4	(United States) C Gauff	3	6	6

Fourth round
(Romania) S Cîrstea	4	6	2
4	(United States) C Gauff	6	3	6

==== Section 7 ====
First round
(United States) M Kessler	2	6	6
(Poland) M Fręch	6	4	2
WC	(Czech Republic) D Vidmanova	7^{7}	5	5
(France) E Jacquemot	6^{5}	7	7
Q	A Zakharova	5	6	6
(Hungary) A Bondár	7	3	1
(United States) S Kenin	6	1	3
A Blinkova	3	6	6

Second round
8	M Andreeva	6	6^{3}	6
(United States) M Kessler	1	7^{7}	1
(France) E Jacquemot	2	2
32	(Czech Republic) M Bouzková	6	6
22	A Kalinskaya	6	1	5
Q	A Zakharova	3	6	7
A Blinkova	2	0
10	(Canada) V Mboko	6	6

Third round
8	M Andreeva	7^{7}	6
32	(Czech Republic) M Bouzková	6^{4}	2
Q	A Zakharova	1	5
10	(Canada) V Mboko	6	7

Fourth round
8	M Andreeva	6^{4}	6	0
10	(Canada) V Mboko	7^{7}	4	6

==== Section 8 ====
First round
(Czech Republic) K Siniaková	1	4
(Colombia) C Osorio	6	6
(United Kingdom) K Boulter	7^{11}	6
(Spain) J Bouzas Maneiro	6^{9}	4
(Germany) L Siegemund	6	6
(Croatia) P Marčinko	4	4
(Poland) M Linette	2	6	6
(France) V Gracheva	6	2	0

Second round
13	(Czech Republic) K Muchová	4	6	7
(Colombia) C Osorio	6	2	5
(United Kingdom) K Boulter	6^{4}	6	1
17	(Denmark) C Tauson	7^{7}	4	0^{r}
31	(Philippines) A Eala	6^{6}	6	6
(Germany) L Siegemund	7^{8}	3	3
(Poland) M Linette	1	7	6
2	(Poland) I Świątek	6	5	3

Third round
13	(Czech Republic) K Muchová	6	7
(United Kingdom) K Boulter	3	5
31	(Philippines) A Eala	6	7^{7}
(Poland) M Linette	3	6^{2}

Fourth round
13	(Czech Republic) K Muchová	6	6
31	(Philippines) A Eala	0	2

== Seeded players ==
The following are the seeded players. Seedings are based on WTA rankings as of March 2, 2026. Rankings and points before are as of March 16, 2026.

^{‡}	Champion
^{†}	Runner-up

Seed	Rank	Player	Points before	Points defending	Points won	Points after	Status
1	1	Aryna Sabalenka ^{‡}	11,025	1,000	1,000	11,025	Champion, defeated (United States) Coco Gauff [4]
2	3	(Poland) Iga Świątek	7,413	215	(65)^{§}	7,263	Second round lost to (Poland) Magda Linette
3	2	(Kazakhstan) Elena Rybakina	7,783	(65)^{∆}	390	8,108	Semifinals lost to Aryna Sabalenka [1]
4	4	(United States) Coco Gauff ^{†}	6,748	120	650	7,278	Runner-up, lost to Aryna Sabalenka [1]
5	5	(United States) Jessica Pegula	6,678	650	215	6,243	Quarterfinals lost to (Kazakhstan) Elena Rybakina [3]
6	6	(United States) Amanda Anisimova	6,180	120	120	6,180	Fourth round lost to (Switzerland) Belinda Bencic [12]
7	7	(Italy) Jasmine Paolini	4,232	390	65	3,907	Third round lost to (Latvia) Jeļena Ostapenko [25]
8	10	Mirra Andreeva	3,066	65	120	3,121	Fourth round lost to (Canada) Victoria Mboko [10]
9	8	(Ukraine) Elina Svitolina	4,020	120	65	3,965	Third round lost to (United States) Hailey Baptiste
10	9	(Canada) Victoria Mboko	3,351	35	215	3,531	Quarterfinals lost to (Czech Republic) Karolína Muchová [13]
11	11	Ekaterina Alexandrova	2,918	10	65	2,973	Third round lost to (Romania) Jaqueline Cristian [34]
12	12	(Switzerland) Belinda Bencic	2,803	35	215	2,983	Quarterfinals lost to (United States) Coco Gauff [4]
13	14	(Czech Republic) Karolína Muchová	2,668	65	390	2,993	Semifinals lost to (United States) Coco Gauff [4]
14	13	(Czech Republic) Linda Nosková	2,801	10	10	2,801	Second round lost to (Romania) Sorana Cîrstea
15	18	(United States) Madison Keys	2,026	65	65	2,026	Third round lost to (China) Zheng Qinwen [23]
16	15	(Japan) Naomi Osaka	2,434	120	10	2,324	Second round lost to (Australia) Talia Gibson [Q]
17	16	(Denmark) Clara Tauson	2,095	65	10	2,040	Second round retired against (United Kingdom) Katie Boulter
18	17	(United States) Iva Jovic	2,070	(30)^{∆}	65	2,105	Third round lost to (Australia) Talia Gibson [Q]
19	22	Liudmila Samsonova	1,845	10	10	1,845	Second round lost to (United States) Hailey Baptiste
20	20	Diana Shnaider	1,898	10	65	1,953	Third round lost to (Switzerland) Belinda Bencic [12]
21	19	(Belgium) Elise Mertens	1,936	65	65	1,936	Third round lost to (Romania) Sorana Cîrstea
22	21	Anna Kalinskaya	1,868	65	10	1,813	Second round lost to Anastasia Zakharova [Q]
23	26	(China) Zheng Qinwen	1,553	215	120	1,458	Fourth round lost to Aryna Sabalenka [1]
~~24~~	~~23~~	~~(United Kingdom) Emma Raducanu~~	1,680	215	0	1,465	Withdrew due to illness
25	24	(Latvia) Jeļena Ostapenko	1,655	10	120	1,765	Fourth round lost to (United States) Hailey Baptiste
26	25	(Canada) Leylah Fernandez	1,598	65	65	1,598	Third round lost to (United States) Jessica Pegula [5]
27	29	(Ukraine) Marta Kostyuk	1,528	120	65	1,473	Third round lost to (Kazakhstan) Elena Rybakina [3]
~~28~~	~~31~~	~~(Australia) Maya Joint~~	1,445	(10)^{∆}	0	1,435	Withdrew due to lower back injury
29	34	(China) Wang Xinyu	1,383	10	10	1,383	Second round lost to (United States) Caty McNally
30	30	(Spain) Cristina Bucșa	1,446	(25)^{∆}	10	1,431	Second round retired against (Ukraine) Yuliia Starodubtseva [Q]
31	28	(Philippines) Alexandra Eala	1,525	390	120	1,255	Fourth round lost to (Czech Republic) Karolína Muchová [13]
32	32	(Czech Republic) Marie Bouzková	1,425	10	65	1,480	Third round lost to Mirra Andreeva [8]
33	33	(Greece) Maria Sakkari	1,410	65	(25)^{§}	1,370	Second round lost to (United States) Alycia Parks
34	36	(Romania) Jaqueline Cristian	1,367	(10+125)^{@}	120+30	1,382	Fourth round lost to (United States) Jessica Pegula [5]

∆ The player is defending points from her 18th best result.
@ The player did not qualify for the main draw in 2025 and is defending points from her sixth best mandatory WTA 1000 tournament, as well as a WTA 125 event (Puerto Vallarta).
§ The player is substituting her next best result as it is higher than the Miami result, which does not need to be counted in her ranking points.

=== Withdrawn seeded players ===
The following players would have been seeded, but withdrew before the tournament began.

Rank	Player	Points before	Points defending	Points after	Withdrawal reason
27	(United States) Emma Navarro	1,550	10	1,550	Undisclosed

== Other entry information ==
=== Wildcards ===
- (United States) Jennifer Brady
- (Australia) Emerson Jones
- (United States) Ashlyn Krueger
- (United States) Sloane Stephens
- (Austria) Lilli Tagger
- (United States) Taylor Townsend
- (Czech Republic) Darja Vidmanova
- (United States) Venus Williams

=== Alternates ===
- (Hungary) Dalma Gálfi

=== Withdrawals ===
- ‡ (France) Loïs Boisson → replaced by (United Kingdom) Katie Boulter
- † (Austria) Julia Grabher → replaced by (Hungary) Dalma Gálfi
- † (Australia) Maya Joint → replaced by (Germany) Ella Seidel (LL)
- † (United Kingdom) Sonay Kartal → replaced by (Uzbekistan) Kamilla Rakhimova (LL)
- ‡ (Australia) Daria Kasatkina → replaced by (Romania) Elena-Gabriela Ruse
- ‡ (Czech Republic) Barbora Krejčíková → replaced by (Switzerland) Simona Waltert
- ‡ Veronika Kudermetova → replaced by (Kazakhstan) Yulia Putintseva
- ‡ (United States) Emma Navarro → replaced by (China) Zhang Shuai
- § (Ukraine) Oleksandra Oliynykova → replaced by Oksana Selekhmeteva
- ‡ (Czech Republic) Karolína Plíšková → replaced by (United States) Alycia Parks
- † (United Kingdom) Emma Raducanu → replaced by (Latvia) Darja Semeņistaja (LL)
- ‡ (Czech Republic) Markéta Vondroušová → replaced by (Austria) Julia Grabher
- ‡ (China) Wang Yafan → replaced by (Turkey) Zeynep Sönmez

§ – not included on entry list
‡ – withdrew from entry list
† – withdrew from main draw

== Qualifying ==
=== Seeds ===
1. (Australia) Kimberly Birrell (qualified)
2. (Switzerland) Viktorija Golubic (qualified)
3. (Germany) Ella Seidel (qualifying competition, lucky loser)
4. (Hungary) Dalma Gálfi (moved to main draw)
5. Anastasia Zakharova (qualified)
6. (Uzbekistan) Kamilla Rakhimova (qualifying competition, lucky loser)
7. (Mexico) Renata Zarazúa (qualifying competition)
8. (Slovenia) Kaja Juvan (first round, retired)
9. (Andorra) Victoria Jiménez Kasintseva (first round)
10. (United States) Katie Volynets (qualified)
11. (Latvia) Darja Semeņistaja (qualifying competition, lucky loser)
12. (New Zealand) Lulu Sun (qualified)
13. (Czech Republic) Nikola Bartůňková (qualifying competition)
14. (Croatia) Donna Vekić (qualifying competition)
15. (Ukraine) Yuliia Starodubtseva (qualified)
16. (Austria) Sinja Kraus (qualified)
17. (Switzerland) Rebeka Masarova (qualified)
18. (France) Diane Parry (qualifying competition)
19. (Australia) Talia Gibson (qualified)
20. (Netherlands) Suzan Lamens (first round)
21. Aliaksandra Sasnovich (qualified)
22. (Slovakia) Rebecca Šramková (qualifying competition)
23. (China) Yuan Yue (qualifying competition)
24. (Czech Republic) Linda Fruhvirtová (qualified)

=== Qualifiers ===
1. (Australia) Kimberly Birrell
2. (Switzerland) Viktorija Golubic
3. (Switzerland) Rebeka Masarova
4. (United States) Elvina Kalieva
5. Anastasia Zakharova
6. (Australia) Talia Gibson
7. Aliaksandra Sasnovich
8. (Ukraine) Yuliia Starodubtseva
9. (Czech Republic) Linda Fruhvirtová
10. (United States) Katie Volynets
11. (Austria) Sinja Kraus
12. (New Zealand) Lulu Sun

=== Lucky losers ===
1. (Germany) Ella Seidel
2. (Uzbekistan) Kamilla Rakhimova
3. (Latvia) Darja Semeņistaja

=== Qualifying draw ===
==== First qualifier ====
First round
1	(Australia) Kimberly Birrell	6	6
(Bulgaria) Viktoriya Tomova	3	2
WC	(United States) Reese Brantmeier	7^{8}	4	2
23	(China) Yuan Yue	6^{6}	6	6

Qualifying competition
1	(Australia) Kimberly Birrell	6	2	6
23	(China) Yuan Yue	2	6	4

==== Second qualifier ====
First round
2	(Switzerland) Viktorija Golubic	2	6	6
WC	(United States) Thea Frodin	6	3	2
(United States) Caroline Dolehide	3	6	3
13	(Czech Republic) Nikola Bartůňková	6	3	6

Qualifying competition
2	(Switzerland) Viktorija Golubic	6	3	7^{7}
13	(Czech Republic) Nikola Bartůňková	3	6	6^{3}

==== Third qualifier ====
First round
3	(Germany) Ella Seidel	6	7
(Canada) Marina Stakusic	4	5
PR	(Australia) Storm Hunter	2	6	2
17	(Switzerland) Rebeka Masarova	6	4	6

Qualifying competition
3	(Germany) Ella Seidel	1	7	5
17	(Switzerland) Rebeka Masarova	6	5	7

==== Fourth qualifier ====
First round
Alt	Marina Melnikova	4	2
(United States) Elvina Kalieva	6	6
(Italy) Lucrezia Stefanini	2	6	5
18	(France) Diane Parry	6	4	7

Qualifying competition
(United States) Elvina Kalieva	6	6
18	(France) Diane Parry	4	0

==== Fifth qualifier ====
First round
5	Anastasia Zakharova	6	6
Alt	(United States) Louisa Chirico	2	1
WC	Erika Andreeva	4	2
22	(Slovakia) Rebecca Šramková	6	6

Qualifying competition
5	Anastasia Zakharova	6	6
22	(Slovakia) Rebecca Šramková	3	2

==== Sixth qualifier ====
First round
6	(Uzbekistan) Kamilla Rakhimova	6^{1}	7	6
(France) Léolia Jeanjean	7^{7}	5	0
(Georgia (country)) Ekaterine Gorgodze	3	2
19	(Australia) Talia Gibson	6	6

Qualifying competition
6	(Uzbekistan) Kamilla Rakhimova	3	4
19	(Australia) Talia Gibson	6	6

==== Seventh qualifier ====
First round
7	(Mexico) Renata Zarazúa	4	6	6
PR	(Italy) Martina Trevisan	6	3	3
WC	(Turkey) Ayla Aksu	4	4
21	Aliaksandra Sasnovich	6	6

Qualifying competition
7	(Mexico) Renata Zarazúa	3	4
21	Aliaksandra Sasnovich	6	6

==== Eighth qualifier ====
First round
8	(Slovenia) Kaja Juvan	6	4	0^{r}
WC	(United States) Mary Stoiana	4	6	3
(Australia) Maddison Inglis	6^{3}	5
15	(Ukraine) Yuliia Starodubtseva	7^{7}	7

Qualifying competition
WC	(United States) Mary Stoiana	2	2
15	(Ukraine) Yuliia Starodubtseva	6	6

==== Ninth qualifier ====
First round
9	(Andorra) Victoria Jiménez Kasintseva	2	6	1
(United States) Varvara Lepchenko	6	1	6
PR	(United States) Madison Brengle	4	7^{7}	3
24	(Czech Republic) Linda Fruhvirtová	6	6^{2}	6

Qualifying competition
(United States) Varvara Lepchenko	3	2
24	(Czech Republic) Linda Fruhvirtová	6	6

==== Tenth qualifier ====
First round
10	(United States) Katie Volynets	6	6^{2}	6
(Australia) Priscilla Hon	1	7^{7}	3
(Canada) Bianca Andreescu	4	6	7
20	(Netherlands) Suzan Lamens	6	1	5

Qualifying competition
10	(United States) Katie Volynets	7	6
(Canada) Bianca Andreescu	5	2

==== Eleventh qualifier ====
First round
11	(Latvia) Darja Semeņistaja	6	6
WC	(United States) Monika Ekstrand	0	4
(Serbia) Lola Radivojević	6^{4}	3
16	(Austria) Sinja Kraus	7^{7}	6

Qualifying competition
11	(Latvia) Darja Semeņistaja	2	3
16	(Austria) Sinja Kraus	6	6

==== Twelfth qualifier ====
First round
12	(New Zealand) Lulu Sun	6	7^{7}
(Uzbekistan) Maria Timofeeva	4	6^{5}
(United States) Whitney Osuigwe	4	2
14	(Croatia) Donna Vekić	6	6

Qualifying competition
12	(New Zealand) Lulu Sun	6	6
14	(Croatia) Donna Vekić	3	3
