= 2026 Miami Open – Wheelchair men's doubles =

Wheelchair men's doubles
- 2026 Miami Open

Final
- Champions: (United Kingdom) Alfie Hewett (United Kingdom) Gordon Reid
- Runners-up: (Spain) Daniel Caverzaschi (Spain) Martin de la Puente
- Score: 6–2 6–0

Events
Singles	men	women
Doubles	men	women
WC Singles	men	women
WC Doubles	men	women
- Miami Open

Alfie Hewett and Gordon Reid won the men's doubles event, defeating Daniel Caverzaschi and Martin de la Puente in the final, 6–2, 6–0.

== Seeds ==
1. (United Kingdom) Alfie Hewett / (United Kingdom) Gordon Reid (champions)
2. (Spain) Daniel Caverzaschi / (Spain) Martin de la Puente (final)

== Draw ==
Key

- Q = Qualifier
- WC = Wild card
- LL = Lucky loser
- Alt = Alternate
- ITF = ITF entry
- PR = Protected ranking
- SR = Special ranking
- SE = Special exempt
- JE = Junior exempt
- JR = Junior Accelerator Programme entrant
- CO = College Accelerator Programme entrant
- NG = Next Gen Accelerator Program entrant
- w/o = Walkover
- r = Retired
- d = Defaulted

=== Finals ===
Semifinals
1	(United Kingdom) Alfie Hewett (United Kingdom) Gordon Reid	3	6	[10]
(Argentina) Gustavo Fernandez (Japan) Tokito Oda	6	3	[4]
(United States) Charlie Cooper (United States) Casey Ratzlaff	3	0
2	(Spain) Daniel Caverzaschi (Spain) Martin de la Puente	6	6

Finals
1	(United Kingdom) Alfie Hewett (United Kingdom) Gordon Reid	6	6
2	(Spain) Daniel Caverzaschi (Spain) Martin de la Puente	2	0
