= 2026 Delray Beach Open – Doubles =

Doubles
- 2026 Delray Beach Open

Final
- Champions: (United States) Austin Krajicek (Croatia) Nikola Mektić
- Runners-up: (United States) Benjamin Kittay (United States) Ryan Seggerman
- Score: 6–7^{(3–7)}, 6–3, [11–9]

Events
Singles	Doubles
- Delray Beach Open

Austin Krajicek and Nikola Mektić defeated Benjamin Kittay and Ryan Seggerman in the final, 6–7^{(3–7)}, 6–3, [11–9] to win the doubles tennis title at the 2026 Delray Beach Open.

Miomir Kecmanović and Brandon Nakashima were the defending champions, but they withdrew from their quarterfinal match.

== Seeds ==
1. (United Kingdom) Luke Johnson / (Poland) Jan Zieliński (first round)
2. (United States) Austin Krajicek / (Croatia) Nikola Mektić (champions)
3. (United States) Robert Cash / (United States) JJ Tracy (semifinals)
4. (Mexico) Santiago González / (Netherlands) David Pel (first round)

== Draw ==
Key

- Q = Qualifier
- WC = Wild card
- LL = Lucky loser
- Alt = Alternate
- ITF = ITF entry
- PR = Protected ranking
- SR = Special ranking
- SE = Special exempt
- JE = Junior exempt
- JR = Junior Accelerator Programme entrant
- CO = College Accelerator Programme entrant
- NG = Next Gen Accelerator Program entrant
- w/o = Walkover
- r = Retired
- d = Defaulted

=== Draw ===
First round
1	(United Kingdom) L Johnson (Poland) J Zieliński	7^{7}	6^{3}	[7]
(Serbia) M Kecmanović (United States) B Nakashima	6^{2}	7^{7}	[10]
(India) S Balaji (Austria) N Oberleitner	6^{4}	6^{2}
WC	(United States) B Kittay (United States) R Seggerman	7^{7}	7^{7}
3	(United States) R Cash (United States) JJ Tracy	6	6
(Portugal) N Borges (Mexico) MÁ Reyes-Varela	3	2
(United States) A Michelsen (United States) R Ram	4	4
(United States) V Kirkov (Netherlands) B Stevens	6	6
WC	(United States) T Hilderbrand (United States) M Kiger	3	3
Alt	(Canada) L Draxl (Antigua and Barbuda) J Maginley	6	6
(France) T Arribagé (France) A Olivetti	6	6
4	(Mexico) S González (Netherlands) D Pel	1	4
PR	(Kazakhstan) A Golubev (Kazakhstan) A Nedovyesov	2	6	[11]
(Uruguay) A Behar (Australia) M Romios	6	4	[13]
(Canada) G Diallo (United States) E Quinn	7^{8}	3	[4]
2	(United States) A Krajicek (Croatia) N Mektić	6^{6}	6	[10]

Quarterfinals
(Serbia) M Kecmanović (United States) B Nakashima
WC	(United States) B Kittay (United States) R Seggerman	w/o
3	(United States) R Cash (United States) JJ Tracy	6	7
(United States) V Kirkov (Netherlands) B Stevens	3	5
Alt	(Canada) L Draxl (Antigua and Barbuda) J Maginley	6^{3}	7^{7}	[10]
(France) T Arribagé (France) A Olivetti	7^{7}	6^{4}	[6]
(Uruguay) A Behar (Australia) M Romios	3	6^{7}
2	(United States) A Krajicek (Croatia) N Mektić	6	7^{9}

Semifinals
WC	(United States) B Kittay (United States) R Seggerman	7	6
3	(United States) R Cash (United States) JJ Tracy	5	3
Alt	(Canada) L Draxl (Antigua and Barbuda) J Maginley	4	6^{1}
2	(United States) A Krajicek (Croatia) N Mektić	6	7^{7}

Final
WC	(United States) B Kittay (United States) R Seggerman	7^{7}	3	[9]
2	(United States) A Krajicek (Croatia) N Mektić	6^{3}	6	[11]
