= Gijón Open =

Defunct tennis tournament
- Founded: 2022; 4 years ago
- Location: Gijón; Spain
- Venue: Palacio de Deportes de Gijón
- Category: ATP Tour 250
- Surface: Hard – indoors
- Draw: 28S / 16Q / 16D
- Prize money: €612,000 (2022)
- Website: https://www.gijonopen.com/

Current champions (2022)
- Men's singles: Andrey Rublev
- Men's doubles: (Argentina) Máximo González / (Argentina) Andrés Molteni

The Gijón Open (known as the Watergen Gijón Open for sponsorship reasons) was an ATP 250 event held in November. The tournament was first held in October 2022 on a single-year license. The tournament was set to return in 2024, but was moved to Belgrade in August, due to unforeseen operational matters.

== Past finals ==
=== Singles ===
Year	Champion	Runner-up	Score
2022	Andrey Rublev	(United States) Sebastian Korda	6–2, 6–3
2023–24	Not held		

=== Doubles ===
Year	Champions	Runners-up	Score
2022	(Argentina) Máximo González (Argentina) Andrés Molteni	(United States) Nathaniel Lammons (United States) Jackson Withrow	6–7^{(6–8)}, 7–6^{(7–4)}, [10–5]
2023–24	Not held		
