= Lizzy de Greef =

Dutch wheelchair tennis player

- Born: 7 April 2004 (age 22) Alphen aan den Rijn, Netherlands
- Turned pro: 2019
- Plays: Right-handed (one-handed backhand)

Singles
- Career titles: 18
- Highest ranking: No. 7 (4 March 2024)
- Current ranking: No. 8 (8 July 2024)

Grand Slam singles results
- Australian Open: QF (2025, 2026)
- French Open: QF (2024, 2025)
- Wimbledon: QF (2025, 2026)
- US Open: 1R (2023, 2025, 2026)

Doubles
- Career record: 42-35
- Career titles: 9
- Highest ranking: No. 14 (6 November 2023)
- Current ranking: No. 16 (8 July 2024)

Grand Slam doubles results
- Australian Open: QF (2024, 2025, 2026)
- French Open: F (2026)
- Wimbledon: QF (2024)
- US Open: QF (2023)

Lizzy de Greef (born 7 April 2004) is a Dutch wheelchair tennis player. She is former world No. 1 in February 2020 in junior singles, she is currently World number 8 in singles and world No. 14 in doubles as of July 2024.

De Greef was born with a clubfoot, she had her right lower leg amputated when she was eleven years old. After she had her surgery, she discovered wheelchair tennis and started training in 2015.
