= Disney litigation =

Disney litigation may refer to:

- Bourne v. Walt Disney Co.
- Disney and Florida's Parental Rights in Education Act
- Disney collusion litigation
- In re Walt Disney Co. Derivative Litigation
- Mandeville-Anthony v. Walt Disney Co.
- Sony Corp. of America v. Universal City Studios, Inc.
- Twin Books Corp. v. Walt Disney Co.

== See also ==
- Disney–Charter Communications dispute
