= 2019 Bella Cup =

- Date: 3–9 June 2019
- Edition: 25th
- Category: ITF Women's World Tennis Tour
- Prize money: $60,000
- Surface: Clay
- Location: Toruń, Poland

Champions

Singles
- (Slovakia) Rebecca Šramková

Doubles
- (Spain) Rebeka Masarova / (Slovakia) Rebecca Šramková
← 2018 ·	Bella Cup	· 2020 →

The 2019 Bella Cup was a professional tennis tournament played on outdoor clay courts. It was the twenty-fifth edition of the tournament which was part of the 2019 ITF Women's World Tennis Tour. It took place in Toruń, Poland between 3 and 9 June 2019.

== Singles main-draw entrants ==
=== Seeds ===
Country	Player	Rank^{1}	Seed
KAZ	Elena Rybakina	141	1
USA	Allie Kiick	150	2
UKR	Anhelina Kalinina	151	3
ROU	Irina Bara	165	4
USA	Robin Anderson	176	5
MNE	Danka Kovinić	182	6
SVK	Jana Čepelová	184	7
POL	Katarzyna Kawa	187	8

- ^{1} Rankings are as of 27 May 2019.

=== Other entrants ===
The following players received wildcards into the singles main draw:

- (Poland) Weronika Falkowska
- (Poland) Anna Hertel
- (Poland) Paula Kania
- (Poland) Stefania Rogozińska Dzik

The following players received entry from the qualifying draw:

- (Brazil) Carolina Alves
- (Romania) Nicoleta Dascălu
- (Australia) Jaimee Fourlis
- (Italy) Verena Meliss
- (Chile) Daniela Seguel
- (Romania) Gabriela Talabă
- (Czech Republic) Nikola Tomanová
- (Spain) Rosa Vicens Mas

== Champions ==
=== Singles ===
- (Slovakia) Rebecca Šramková def. (Ukraine) Marta Kostyuk, 6–1, 6–2

=== Doubles ===
- (Spain) Rebeka Masarova / (Slovakia) Rebecca Šramková def. (United States) Robin Anderson / (Ukraine) Anhelina Kalinina, 6–4, 3–6, [10–4]
