= 2023 US Open (tennis) =

- Date: August 28 – September 10
- Edition: 143rd
- Category: Grand Slam (ITF)
- Draw: 128S/64D
- Prize money: $65,000,000
- Surface: Hard
- Location: New York City, United States
- Venue: USTA Billie Jean King National Tennis Center

Champions

Men's singles
- (Serbia) Novak Djokovic

Women's singles
- (United States) Coco Gauff

Men's doubles
- (United States) Rajeev Ram / (United Kingdom) Joe Salisbury

Women's doubles
- (Canada) Gabriela Dabrowski / (New Zealand) Erin Routliffe

Mixed doubles
- (Kazakhstan) Anna Danilina / (Finland) Harri Heliövaara

Wheelchair men's singles
- (United Kingdom) Alfie Hewett

Wheelchair women's singles
- (Netherlands) Diede de Groot

Wheelchair quad singles
- (Netherlands) Sam Schröder

Wheelchair men's doubles
- (France) Stéphane Houdet / (Japan) Takashi Sanada

Wheelchair women's doubles
- (Japan) Yui Kamiji / (South Africa) Kgothatso Montjane

Wheelchair quad doubles
- (Netherlands) Sam Schröder / (Netherlands) Niels Vink

Boys' singles
- (Brazil) João Fonseca

Girls' singles
- (United States) Katherine Hui

Boys' doubles
- (Sweden) Max Dahlin / (Estonia) Oliver Ojakäär

Girls' doubles
- (Romania) Mara Gae / Anastasiia Gureva

Wheelchair boys' singles
- (United Kingdom) Dahnon Ward

Wheelchair girls' singles
- (France) Ksénia Chasteau

Wheelchair boys' doubles
- (United Kingdom) Joshua Johns / (United Kingdom) Dahnon Ward

Wheelchair girls' doubles
- (France) Ksénia Chasteau / (United States) Maylee Phelps
- US Open

The 2023 US Open was the 143rd edition of tennis' US Open and the fourth and final Grand Slam event of the year. It was held on outdoor hard courts at the USTA Billie Jean King National Tennis Center in New York City. Carlos Alcaraz and Iga Świątek were the men's and women's singles defending champions. Świątek lost to Jeļena Ostapenko in the fourth round, while Alcaraz lost to Daniil Medvedev in the semifinals.

== Tournament ==
The 2023 US Open was the 143rd consecutive edition of the tournament and took place at the USTA Billie Jean King National Tennis Center in Flushing Meadows–Corona Park of Queens in New York City. The tournament was held on 17 Laykold hard courts.

The tournament was an event run by the International Tennis Federation (ITF) and was part of the 2023 ATP Tour and the 2023 WTA Tour calendars under the Grand Slam category. The tournament consisted of both men's and women's singles and doubles draws, as both doubles draws returned to standard 64 players, as singles players remained in standard 128 person format in each category. There were also singles and doubles events for both boys and girls (players under 18), which are part of the Grade A category of tournaments.

The tournament was played on hard courts and took place over a series of 17 courts with Laykold surface, including the three existing main showcourts – Arthur Ashe Stadium, Louis Armstrong Stadium and Grandstand.

It became the first grand slam tournament to introduce the Video Review system in which players could challenge specific judgement calls made by a chair umpire in a match, such as if a ball bounced twice.

== Broadcast ==
In the United States, the 2023 US Open was the ninth year in a row under an 11-year, $825 million contract with ESPN, in which the broadcaster holds exclusive rights to the entire tournament and the US Open Series. For the first time since 2014, the US Open aired on broadcast television, as ABC televised selected weekend matches. ESPN is also the exclusive U.S. broadcaster for the Wimbledon Championships and the Australian Open.

Due to the recent Disney–Charter Communications dispute, ESPN has ended up providing complimentary access to some players and even on-air talent their access to the matches.

== Singles players ==
- Men's singles

Champion		Runner-up	
(Serbia) Novak Djokovic [2]		Daniil Medvedev [3]	
Semifinals out
(Spain) Carlos Alcaraz [1]		(United States) Ben Shelton	
Quarterfinals out
(Germany) Alexander Zverev [12]	Andrey Rublev [8]	(United States) Frances Tiafoe [10]	(United States) Taylor Fritz [9]
4th round out
(Italy) Matteo Arnaldi	(Italy) Jannik Sinner [6]	(Australia) Alex de Minaur [13]	(United Kingdom) Jack Draper
(Australia) Rinky Hijikata (WC)	(United States) Tommy Paul [14]	(Switzerland) Dominic Stricker (Q)	(Croatia) Borna Gojo (Q)
3rd round out
(United Kingdom) Dan Evans [26]	(United Kingdom) Cameron Norrie [16]	(Bulgaria) Grigor Dimitrov [19]	(Switzerland) Stan Wawrinka
(Argentina) Sebastián Báez	(Chile) Nicolás Jarry [23]	(United States) Michael Mmoh (WC)	(France) Arthur Rinderknech
(China) Zhang Zhizhen	(France) Adrian Mannarino [22]	(Spain) Alejandro Davidovich Fokina [21]	Aslan Karatsev
(France) Benjamin Bonzi (WC)	(Czech Republic) Jakub Menšík (Q)	(Czech Republic) Jiří Veselý (PR)	(Serbia) Laslo Djere [32]
2nd round out
(South Africa) Lloyd Harris (PR)	(Netherlands) Botic van de Zandschulp	(France) Arthur Fils	(Chinese Taipei) Hsu Yu-hsiou (Q)
(Germany) Daniel Altmaier	(United Kingdom) Andy Murray	(Argentina) Tomás Martín Etcheverry [30]	(Italy) Lorenzo Sonego
(Australia) Christopher O'Connell	(Brazil) Felipe Meligeni Alves (Q)	(United States) Alex Michelsen (WC)	(China) Wu Yibing
(United States) John Isner (WC)	(Poland) Hubert Hurkacz [17]	(Italy) Matteo Berrettini	(France) Gaël Monfils (PR)
(Norway) Casper Ruud [5]	(Hungary) Márton Fucsovics	(Hungary) Fábián Marozsán	(Austria) Sebastian Ofner
Roman Safiullin	(Argentina) Juan Manuel Cerúndolo	(Austria) Dominic Thiem	(Spain) Roberto Carballés Baena
(Greece) Stefanos Tsitsipas [7]	(United States) Christopher Eubanks [28]	(France) Titouan Droguet (Q)	(Peru) Juan Pablo Varillas
(United States) Mackenzie McDonald	(Argentina) Francisco Cerúndolo [20]	(France) Hugo Gaston (Q)	(Spain) Bernabé Zapata Miralles
1st round out
(Germany) Dominik Koepfer	(Argentina) Guido Pella (PR)	(Australia) Jordan Thompson	(Colombia) Daniel Elahi Galán
(Netherlands) Tallon Griekspoor [24]	(Australia) Jason Kubler	(Australia) Thanasi Kokkinakis	Alexander Shevchenko
(Australia) Aleksandar Vukic	(France) Constant Lestienne	(France) Corentin Moutet	(Slovakia) Alex Molčan
(Finland) Otto Virtanen (Q)	(Japan) Yoshihito Nishioka	(United States) Nicolas Moreno de Alboran (Q)	(Germany) Yannick Hanfmann
(Hungary) Attila Balázs (PR)	(Australia) Max Purcell	(Australia) James Duckworth (LL)	(Croatia) Borna Ćorić [27]
(France) Luca Van Assche	(Spain) Albert Ramos Viñolas	(Serbia) Dušan Lajović	(Kazakhstan) Timofey Skatov (Q)
Karen Khachanov [11]	(Argentina) Facundo Díaz Acosta	(Moldova) Radu Albot	(Switzerland) Marc-Andrea Hüsler
(France) Ugo Humbert [29]	(Argentina) Diego Schwartzman	(Japan) Taro Daniel (Q)	(France) Arthur Cazaux (LL)
(United States) Emilio Nava (Q)	(United States) J. J. Wolf	Pavel Kotov	(United States) Sebastian Korda [31]
(Japan) Yosuke Watanuki	(France) Richard Gasquet	(Portugal) Nuno Borges	(United States) Learner Tien (WC)
(Italy) Stefano Travaglia (Q)	(Italy) Marco Cecchinato	Ilya Ivashka	(United States) Marcos Giron
(Kazakhstan) Alexander Bublik [25]	(Argentina) Pedro Cachin	(Czech Republic) Jiří Lehečka	(Denmark) Holger Rune [4]
(Canada) Milos Raonic (PR)	(Australia) Alexei Popyrin	(France) Quentin Halys	(South Korea) Kwon Soon-woo
(Italy) Lorenzo Musetti [18]	(France) Grégoire Barrère	(Serbia) Miomir Kecmanović	(United States) Steve Johnson (WC)
(Canada) Félix Auger-Aliassime [15]	(Bolivia) Hugo Dellien (PR)	(France) Enzo Couacaud (Q)	(United States) Zachary Svajda (Q)
(United States) Brandon Nakashima	(Japan) Sho Shimabukuro (Q)	(United States) Ethan Quinn (WC)	(France) Alexandre Müller

- Women's singles

Champion		Runner-up	
(United States) Coco Gauff [6]		Aryna Sabalenka [2]	
Semifinals out
(Czech Republic) Karolína Muchová [10]		(United States) Madison Keys [17]	
Quarterfinals out
(Latvia) Jeļena Ostapenko [20]	(Romania) Sorana Cîrstea [30]	(Czech Republic) Markéta Vondroušová [9]	(China) Zheng Qinwen [23]
4th round out
(Poland) Iga Świątek [1]	(Denmark) Caroline Wozniacki (WC)	(Switzerland) Belinda Bencic [15]	(China) Wang Xinyu
(United States) Peyton Stearns	(United States) Jessica Pegula [3]	(Tunisia) Ons Jabeur [5]	Daria Kasatkina [13]
3rd round out
(Slovenia) Kaja Juvan (Q)	(United States) Bernarda Pera	(United States) Jennifer Brady (PR)	(Belgium) Elise Mertens [32]
(Kazakhstan) Elena Rybakina [4]	(China) Zhu Lin	(United States) Taylor Townsend	(Slovakia) Anna Karolína Schmiedlová
(United Kingdom) Katie Boulter	Ekaterina Alexandrova [22]	Liudmila Samsonova [14]	(Ukraine) Elina Svitolina [26]
(Czech Republic) Marie Bouzková [31]	(Italy) Lucia Bronzetti	(Belgium) Greet Minnen (Q)	(France) Clara Burel
2nd round out
(Australia) Daria Saville (PR)	(United States) Lauren Davis	Elina Avanesyan	(China) Wang Xiyu
(Czech Republic) Petra Kvitová [11]	(Poland) Magda Linette [24]	(United States) Danielle Collins	Mirra Andreeva
(Australia) Ajla Tomljanović	Anna Kalinskaya	Victoria Azarenka [18]	(United Kingdom) Yuriko Miyazaki (Q)
(Poland) Magdalena Fręch	(Brazil) Beatriz Haddad Maia [19]	(Spain) Sara Sorribes Tormo	(Spain) Rebeka Masarova
(China) Wang Yafan (Q)	(Denmark) Clara Tauson	(Ukraine) Lesia Tsurenko	(Italy) Martina Trevisan
(Germany) Tamara Korpatsch	(Belgium) Yanina Wickmayer (LL)	Anastasia Pavlyuchenkova	(Romania) Patricia Maria Țig (PR)
(Czech Republic) Linda Nosková	(Croatia) Petra Martić	(Estonia) Kaia Kanepi	(Germany) Eva Lys (Q)
(United States) Sofia Kenin	(United States) Sachia Vickery (Q)	(Czech Republic) Karolína Plíšková [25]	(United Kingdom) Jodie Burrage
1st round out
(Sweden) Rebecca Peterson	(United States) Clervie Ngounoue (WC)	(Montenegro) Danka Kovinić	(Italy) Elisabetta Cocciaretto [29]
(Italy) Jasmine Paolini	(France) Alizé Cornet	(Slovakia) Viktória Hrunčáková (LL)	Veronika Kudermetova [16]
(Spain) Cristina Bucșa	Tatiana Prozorova (Q)	(Australia) Kimberly Birrell (LL)	Aliaksandra Sasnovich
(Sweden) Mirjam Björklund (Q)	(Czech Republic) Linda Fruhvirtová	(Australia) Olivia Gadecki (Q)	(Germany) Laura Siegemund (Q)
(Ukraine) Marta Kostyuk	(Hungary) Panna Udvardy	(Czech Republic) Kateřina Siniaková	(United States) Kayla Day (WC)
(France) Fiona Ferro (WC)	(Egypt) Mayar Sherif	Margarita Betova	Kamilla Rakhimova
(Australia) Storm Hunter (WC)	(United States) Emma Navarro	(France) Varvara Gracheva	(United States) Sloane Stephens
(Ukraine) Anhelina Kalinina [28]	(United States) Katie Volynets (Q)	(Ukraine) Kateryna Baindl	(Greece) Maria Sakkari [8]
(France) Caroline Garcia [7]	(France) Diane Parry	(Bulgaria) Viktoriya Tomova	Anastasia Potapova [27]
(Canada) Leylah Fernandez	(France) Elsa Jacquemot (Q)	(Kazakhstan) Yulia Putintseva	(South Korea) Han Na-lae (Q)
(United States) Claire Liu	(Romania) Irina-Camelia Begu	Vera Zvonareva (Q)	(Netherlands) Arantxa Rus
(Germany) Anna-Lena Friedsam	(United States) Fiona Crawley (Q)	(Canada) Rebecca Marino	(Italy) Camila Giorgi
(Colombia) Camila Osorio	(United States) Madison Brengle	(Germany) Tatjana Maria	(United States) Ashlyn Krueger (WC)
(Argentina) Nadia Podoroska	(Czech Republic) Barbora Strýcová (PR)	(United States) Robin Montgomery (WC)	(Czech Republic) Barbora Krejčíková [12]
(United States) Alycia Parks	(Romania) Ana Bogdan	(United States) Venus Williams (WC)	(Croatia) Donna Vekić [21]
(Romania) Elena-Gabriela Ruse (Q)	(United States) Caroline Dolehide	Anna Blinkova	(Belgium) Maryna Zanevska

== Events ==
=== Men's singles ===
- (Serbia) Novak Djokovic def. Daniil Medvedev, 6–3, 7–6^{(7–5)}, 6–3

=== Women's singles ===
- (United States) Coco Gauff def. Aryna Sabalenka, 2–6, 6–3, 6–2

=== Men's doubles ===
- (United States) Rajeev Ram / (United Kingdom) Joe Salisbury def. (India) Rohan Bopanna / (Australia) Matthew Ebden, 2–6, 6–3, 6–4

=== Women's doubles ===
- (Canada) Gabriela Dabrowski / (New Zealand) Erin Routliffe def. (Germany) Laura Siegemund / Vera Zvonareva, 7–6^{(11–9)}, 6–3

=== Mixed doubles ===
- (Kazakhstan) Anna Danilina / (Finland) Harri Heliövaara def. (United States) Jessica Pegula / (United States) Austin Krajicek, 6–3, 6–4

=== Wheelchair men's singles ===
- (United Kingdom) Alfie Hewett def. (United Kingdom) Gordon Reid, 6–4, 6–3

=== Wheelchair women's singles ===
- (Netherlands) Diede de Groot def. (Japan) Yui Kamiji, 6–2, 6–2

=== Wheelchair quad singles ===
- (Netherlands) Sam Schröder def. (Netherlands) Niels Vink, 6–3, 7–5

=== Wheelchair men's doubles ===
- (France) Stéphane Houdet / (Japan) Takashi Sanada def. (Japan) Takuya Miki / (Japan) Tokito Oda, 6–4, 6–4

=== Wheelchair women's doubles ===
- (Japan) Yui Kamiji / (South Africa) Kgothatso Montjane def. (Netherlands) Diede de Groot / (Netherlands) Jiske Griffioen, walkover

=== Wheelchair quad doubles ===
- (Netherlands) Sam Schröder / (Netherlands) Niels Vink def. (United Kingdom) Andy Lapthorne / (South Africa) Donald Ramphadi, 6–1, 6–2

=== Boys' singles ===
- (Brazil) João Fonseca def. (United States) Learner Tien, 4–6, 6–4, 6–3

=== Girls' singles ===
- (United States) Katherine Hui def. (Czech Republic) Tereza Valentová, 6–4, 6–4

=== Boys' doubles ===
- (Sweden) Max Dahlin / (Estonia) Oliver Ojakaar def. (Italy) Federico Bondioli / (Austria) Joel Schwärzler, 3–6, 6–3, [11–9]

=== Girls' doubles ===
- (Romania) Mara Gae / Anastasiia Gureva def. (Japan) Sara Saito / (Japan) Nanaka Sato, 1–6, 7–5, [10–8]

=== Wheelchair boys' singles ===
- (United Kingdom) Dahnon Ward def. (Italy) Francesco Felici, 6–4, 6–3

=== Wheelchair girls' singles ===
- (France) Ksénia Chasteau def. (United States) Maylee Phelps, 6–3, 6–1

=== Wheelchair boys' doubles ===
- (United Kingdom) Joshua Johns / (United Kingdom) Dahnon Ward def. (United States) Charlie Cooper / (United States) Tomas Majetic, 6–0, 6–3

=== Wheelchair girls' doubles ===
- (France) Ksénia Chasteau / (United States) Maylee Phelps def. (United States) Sabina Czauz / (Japan) Yuma Takamuro, 7–5, 6–0

== Point and prize money distribution ==
=== Point distribution ===
Below is a series of tables for each competition showing each event's ranking points on offer.

Event	W	F	SF	QF	R4	R3	R2	R1	Q	Q3	Q2	Q1
Men's singles	2000	1200	720	360	180	90	45	10	25	16	8	0
Men's doubles	2000	1200	720	360	180	90	0	—	—	—	—	—
Women's singles	2000	1300	780	430	240	130	70	10	40	30	20	2
Women's doubles	2000	1300	780	430	240	130	10	—	—	—	—	—

==== Wheelchair ====
Event	W	F	SF/3rd	QF/4th
Singles	800	500	375	100
Doubles	800	500	100	—
Quad singles	800	500	375	100
Quad doubles	800	100	—	—

==== Junior ====
Event	W	F	SF	QF	Round of 16	Round of 32	Q	Q3
Boys' singles	1000	600	370	200	100	45	30	20
Girls' singles	1000	600	370	200	100	45	30	20
Boys' doubles	750	450	275	150	75	—N/a	—N/a	—N/a
Girls' doubles	750	450	275	150	75	—N/a	—N/a	—N/a

=== Prize money ===
The total overall prize money for the 2023 US Open totals $65 million, 8% more than the 2022 edition.

Event	W	F	SF	QF	Round of 16	Round of 32	Round of 64	Round of 128	Q3	Q2	Q1
Singles	$3,000,000	$1,500,000	$775,000	$455,000	$284,000	$191,000	$123,000	$81,500	$45,000	$34,500	$22,000
Doubles*	$700,000	$350,000	$180,000	$100,000	$58,000	$36,800	$22,000	N/A	N/A	N/A	N/A
Mixed Doubles*	$170,000	$85,000	$42,500	$23,200	$14,200	$8,300	N/A	N/A	N/A	N/A	N/A

- per team

Preceded by 2023 Wimbledon Championships	Grand Slams	Succeeded by 2024 Australian Open
