= 2019 Bella Cup – Singles =

Singles
- 2019 Bella Cup

Final
- Champion: (Slovakia) Rebecca Šramková
- Runner-up: (Ukraine) Marta Kostyuk
- Score: 6–1, 6–2

Events
Singles	Doubles
← 2018 ·	Bella Cup	· 2020 →

Barbora Krejčíková was the defending champion, but chose not to participate.

Rebecca Šramková won the title, defeating Marta Kostyuk in the final, 6–1, 6–2.

== Seeds ==
1. (Kazakhstan) Elena Rybakina (first round)
2. (United States) Allie Kiick (semifinals)
3. (Ukraine) Anhelina Kalinina (quarterfinals)
4. (Romania) Irina Bara (semifinals, retired)
5. (United States) Robin Anderson (first round)
6. (Montenegro) Danka Kovinić (quarterfinals)
7. (Slovakia) Jana Čepelová (first round)
8. (Poland) Katarzyna Kawa (first round)

== Draw ==
=== Key ===
- Q = Qualifier
- WC = Wild card
- LL = Lucky loser
- Alt = Alternate
- SE = Special exempt
- PR = Protected ranking
- ITF = ITF entry
- JE = Junior exempt
- w/o = Walkover
- r = Retired
- d = Defaulted
- SR = Special ranking

=== Finals ===
Semifinals
(Slovakia) Rebecca Šramková	6	4
4	(Romania) Irina Bara	4	3^{r}
(Ukraine) Marta Kostyuk	6^{2}	6	6
2	(United States) Allie Kiick	7^{7}	3	4

Final
(Slovakia) Rebecca Šramková	6	6
(Ukraine) Marta Kostyuk	1	2

=== Top half ===
First round
1	(Kazakhstan) E Rybakina	2	4
(Slovakia) R Šramková	6	6
(Belgium) M Benoît	6	6
Q	(Czech Republic) N Tomanová	4	4
WC	(Poland) P Kania	2	1
Q	(Australia) J Fourlis	6	6
(Czech Republic) A Zarycká	4	7^{7}	6
8	(Poland) K Kawa	6	6^{3}	1
4	(Romania) I Bara	6	6
(Ukraine) K Zavatska	3	4
WC	(Poland) S Rogozińska Dzik	6	6
(Australia) O Rogowska	4	3
Q	(Romania) N Dascălu	6	6
WC	(Poland) W Falkowska	3	1
Q	(Spain) R Vicens Mas	6	2	6
7	(Slovakia) J Čepelová	4	6	3

Second round
(Slovakia) R Šramková	6	6
(Belgium) M Benoît	3	4
Q	(Australia) J Fourlis	6	6^{4}	3
(Czech Republic) A Zarycká	1	7^{7}	6
4	(Romania) I Bara	6	6
WC	(Poland) S Rogozińska Dzik	2	2
Q	(Romania) N Dascălu	6	6
Q	(Spain) R Vicens Mas	4	3

Quarterfinals
(Slovakia) R Šramková	6	6
(Czech Republic) A Zarycká	1	3
4	(Romania) I Bara	6	6
Q	(Romania) N Dascălu	2	3

Semifinals
(Slovakia) R Šramková	6	4
4	(Romania) I Bara	4	3^{r}

=== Bottom half ===
First round
5	(United States) R Anderson	2	1
(Argentina) P Ormaechea	6	6
(Ukraine) M Kostyuk	6	6
(Spain) N Párrizas Díaz	2	0
Q	(Brazil) C Alves	6	4	5
(Spain) O Sáez Larra	2	6	1^{r}
WC	(Poland) A Hertel	1	2
3	(Ukraine) A Kalinina	6	6
6	(Montenegro) D Kovinić	6	1	6
(Serbia) N Stojanović	4	6	1
Q	(Romania) G Talabă	7^{7}	6
Q	(Italy) V Meliss	6^{2}	2
(Poland) M Chwalińska	6	6
Q	(Chile) D Seguel	2	2
(Romania) A Cadanțu	4	1
2	(United States) A Kiick	6	6

Second round
(Argentina) P Ormaechea	4	6	6^{4}
(Ukraine) M Kostyuk	6	4	7^{7}
Q	(Brazil) C Alves	3	2
3	(Ukraine) A Kalinina	6	6
6	(Montenegro) D Kovinić	6	3	6
Q	(Romania) G Talabă	2	6	2
(Poland) M Chwalińska	2	2
2	(United States) A Kiick	6	6

Quarterfinals
(Ukraine) M Kostyuk	1	6	6
3	(Ukraine) A Kalinina	6	3	3
6	(Montenegro) D Kovinić	5	3
2	(United States) A Kiick	7	6

Semifinals
(Ukraine) M Kostyuk	6^{2}	6	6
2	(United States) A Kiick	7^{7}	3	4
