= Miro Slavov =

Ukrainian footballer

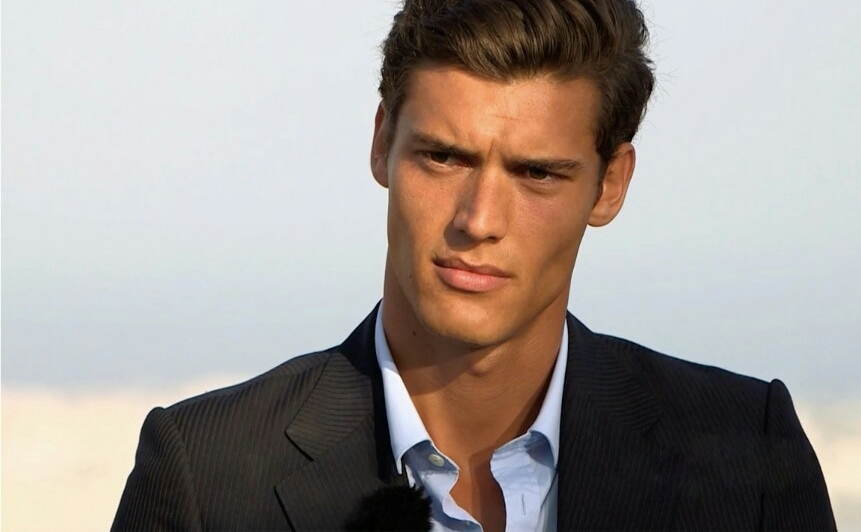
- Slavov in 2014

Personal information
- Full name: Myroslav Dmytrovych Slavov
- Date of birth: 8 September 1990 (age 36)
- Place of birth: Kyiv, Ukrainian SSR, Soviet Union
- Height: 1.98 m (6 ft 6 in)
- Position: Forward

Team information
- Current team: SC Maria Lanzendorf

Youth career
- 1995–2000: Austria Wien
- 2000–2002: Rapid Wien
- 2002–2008: First Vienna
- 2008–2010: Bordeaux

Senior career*
| Years | Team | Apps | (Gls) |
| 2008–2010 | Bordeaux II | 13 | (0) |
| 2010–2012 | Anzhi Makhachkala | 1 | (0) |
| 2011 | → Metalurh Donetsk (loan) | 5 | (0) |
| 2012–2013 | First Vienna | 20 | (6) |
| 2014–2016 | Kremser SC | 39 | (48) |
| 2016–2017 | Berliner AK 07 | 45 | (25) |
| 2017–2018 | Chemnitzer FC | 33 | (12) |
| 2018 | VfR Aalen | 0 | (0) |
| 2018 | Vendsyssel FF | 4 | (0) |
| 2019 | Khor Fakkan | | |
| 2019–2020 | Riga FC | 9 | (3) |
| 2020 | Shahr Khodro | 4 | (0) |
| 2021 | Kremser SC | | |
| 2023– | SC Maria Lanzendorf | | |

International career
| 2006 | Ukraine U16 | 4 | (2) |
| 2007 | Ukraine U17 | 2 | (1) |
| 2007 | Ukraine U18 | 5 | (1) |
| 2008 | Ukraine U19 | 1 | (1) |
- * Club domestic league appearances and goals as of 23:42, 1 January 2020 (UTC)

Myroslav Dmytrovych "Miro" Slavov (Ukrainian: Мирослав Дмитрович Славов; born 8 September 1990) is a Ukrainian football forward who plays for Austrian club SC Maria Lanzendorf.

== Career ==
Slavov was born in Kyiv, in the Ukrainian SSR of the Soviet Union. After emigration from Ukraine together with his parents, he played for youth teams of different Austrian clubs. Then he signed his first professional contract and played for the reserves team of FC Girondins de Bordeaux in France Ligue 1, but he never made his debut for the main squad of the club. Next, he signed a contract with FC Anzhi Makhachkala in Russian Premier League on 27 August 2010.

He made his professional debut for Anzhi's main squad on 1 March 2011, when he started in a Russian Cup game against Zenit St. Petersburg.

Slavov signed for Vendsyssel FF on 2 September 2018. After six official games, his contract got terminated on 17 January 2019. A few days later he signed for Khor Fakkan Club in the United Arab Emirates. In May 2019, Slavov became UAE First Division League champion and promoted with Khor Fakkan Club to UAE Pro League. In August 2019, he was transferred to Riga FC in Latvian Virsliga. After he became champions with Riga FC too, he signed for Shahr Khodro F.C. in iranian's Persian Gulf Pro League in January 2020.

== Personal life ==
Has an elder brother, Vadym Slavov, who was a professional football player. He played for the club FC Arsenal Bila Tserkva. His younger sister Oksana Slavova took part in the rhythmic gymnastics' World Championship in 2018.

His cousin is Marta Kostyuk, a Ukrainian professional tennis player.

In 2014, he competed in the sixth season of Austria's Next Topmodel. He was eliminated in episode 8. In January and February 2015, he participated in Rendezvous im Paradies, an Austrian dating reality series on Puls 4. Later this year he walked for Jean Paul Gaultier for his Fashion Show at the Life Ball in Vienna and for Dirk Bikkembergs for his spring/summer 2016 collection in Milan Fashion Week.

In 2018, Slavov appeared in Police's Shock-in-Scent perfume campaign. In 2019 he starred with David Hasselhoff in an advertisement for an Austrian gambling provider.

Miro is fluent in five languages: Ukrainian, English, Russian, French and German.
