= Oksana Slavova =

Austrian rhythmic gymnast

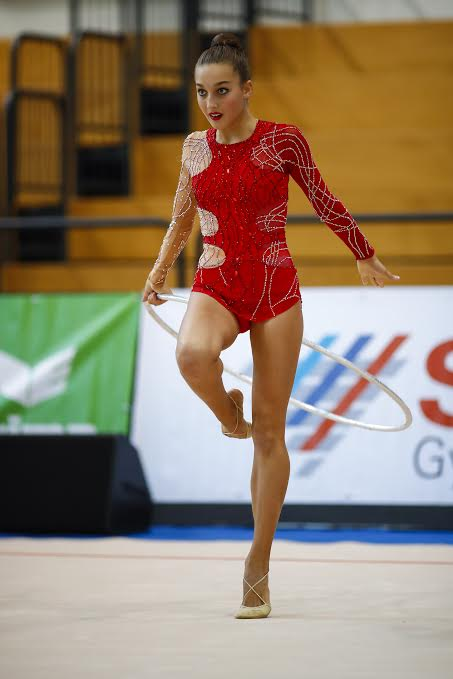

Personal information
- Born: 27 October 2001 (age 25) Vienna, Austria
- Height: 169 cm (5 ft 7 in)
- Relatives: Miro Slavov (brother); Marta Kostyuk (cousin)

Gymnastics career
- Discipline: Rhythmic gymnastics
- Country represented: Austria
- Club: MTV Hernals
- Head coach: Luchia Egermann
- Assistant coach: Maria Slavova

Oksana Slavova (born 27 October 2001) is an Austrian rhythmic gymnast of Ukrainian descent.

== Personal life ==
Slavova was born into an academic family. Her father is the philologist Dmitry Slavov, her mother is the mathematics lecturer Tatyana Slavova, her grandfather Ivan Bejko mathematician and bearer of the Order of Prince Yaroslav. Her brother Vadym is a former professional football player, her other brother Myroslav Slavov still plays football professionally. Her cousin Marta Kostyuk is a professional tennis player.

== Career ==
Oksana Slavova first took ballet lessons as a child, and her older sister Maria introduced her to rhythmic gymnastics. In 2011 and 2012 Slavova became Austrian Junior Champion. In 2018 she took part in the 36th World Championships, the Austrian team ended 26th among 61 nations. In the individual competition, Slavova finished 96th out of a total of 161 gymnasts at the World Championships.
