= Cars (film) =

2006 film by John Lasseter

- Theatrical release poster
- Directed by: John Lasseter
- Screenplay by: Dan Fogelman; John Lasseter; Joe Ranft; Kiel Murray; Phil Lorin; Jorgen Klubien
- Story by: John Lasseter; Joe Ranft; Jorgen Klubien
- Produced by: Darla K. Anderson
- Starring: Paul Newman; Owen Wilson; Bonnie Hunt; Larry the Cable Guy; Tony Shalhoub; Michael Keaton; Cheech Marin
- Cinematography: Jeremy Lasky; Jean Claude Kalache
- Edited by: Ken Schretzmann
- Music by: Randy Newman
- Production company: Pixar Animation Studios
- Distributed by: Buena Vista Pictures Distribution (Note: Distributed under the Walt Disney Pictures banner.)
- Release dates: May 26, 2006 (Lowe's Motor Speedway); June 9, 2006 (United States)
- Running time: 116 minutes
- Country: United States
- Language: English
- Budget: $120 million
- Box office: $484 million

Cars is a 2006 American animated sports comedy film directed by John Lasseter, who co-wrote it with Joe Ranft, Dan Fogelman, Kiel Murray, Phil Lorin and Jorgen Klubien. Produced by Pixar Animation Studios for Walt Disney Pictures, the film stars Paul Newman and Owen Wilson, with an ensemble voice cast consisting of Bonnie Hunt, Larry the Cable Guy, Tony Shalhoub, Cheech Marin, Michael Wallis, George Carlin, Paul Dooley, Jenifer Lewis, Guido Quaroni, Michael Keaton, Katherine Helmond, John Ratzenberger, and Richard Petty.

Set in a world populated entirely by anthropomorphic vehicles, the film follows a young self-obsessed racecar named Lightning McQueen (Wilson) who, on the way to the most important race of his life for the Piston Cup, becomes stranded in a forgotten town along U.S. Route 66 called Radiator Springs, where he learns about friendship and begins to reevaluate his priorities.

Development for Cars started in 1998 following discussions between Lasseter and Klubien after production of A Bug's Life had wrapped. Klubien began to develop a new script titled The Yellow Car, which was about an electric car living in a gas-guzzling world. Shortly after, production was resumed with major script changes. The film was inspired by Lasseter's experiences on a cross-country road trip. Randy Newman composed the film's score, while artists such as Sheryl Crow, Rascal Flatts, John Mayer, and Brad Paisley contributed to the film's soundtrack. Cars ultimately served as the final film independently produced by Pixar after its purchase by Disney in January 2006.

Cars premiered on May 26, 2006, at Lowe's Motor Speedway in Concord, North Carolina, and was theatrically released in the United States on June 9 to generally positive reviews and commercial success, grossing $484 million worldwide against a budget of $120 million, becoming the sixth-highest-grossing film of 2006. It received two nominations at the 79th Academy Awards, including Best Animated Feature, but lost to Happy Feet (but won both the Annie Award for Best Animated Feature and the Golden Globe Award for Best Animated Feature Film). The film was dedicated to Ranft, who died in a car crash during the film's production.

The success of Cars launched a multimedia franchise that includes two sequels: Cars 2 (2011) and Cars 3 (2017), as well as two spin-off films produced by Disneytoon Studios: Planes (2013) and Planes: Fire and Rescue (2014).

== Plot ==
In a world populated by anthropomorphic vehicles, the Dinoco 400 race marks the end of the Piston Cup race season. Heading into the event, retiring seven-time champion Strip "The King" Weathers, the consistent runner-up Chick Hicks, and the talented and arrogant rookie Lightning McQueen are all tied for the season points lead. McQueen is desperate to win and leave his unglamorous Rust-eze sponsorship for the prestigious Dinoco, and struggles with teamwork due to his self-centered attitude.

At the end of the high-stakes race, McQueen squanders his lead by refusing to change tires during a pit stop, causing his rear tires to blow out on the last lap. The race ends in a three-way tie between the leaders, setting the stage for a decisive tiebreaker race at the Los Angeles International Speedway in one week. After the race, McQueen rushes through the night on the interstate to reach California inside his transport truck Mack. A mishap with some street racers culminates in McQueen stranded alone in the rundown desert town of Radiator Springs, Arizona. He inadvertently damages the main road and is sentenced to a community service assignment of repaving it under the supervision of the town's judge Doc Hudson, who is prejudiced against McQueen for being a racecar.

McQueen shoddily repaves the road in a rush to leave, resulting in Doc challenging him to a race for his freedom, on the condition he starts over from scratch if he loses. The overconfident McQueen, having never raced on a dirt road before, spins out on a turn and crashes into a cactus patch, with Doc having set up the race to dampen his ego.

Over time, McQueen begins to warm up to and befriends the town's residents, especially local tow truck Mater, and Sally Carrera, who dreams of reviving Radiator Springs. As he bonds with the locals, McQueen learns of Radiator Springs' heyday and subsequent economic decline; the town was once a bustling attraction for drivers on Route 66, before the construction of an interstate highway bypassed their town and caused them to lose their business traffic. McQueen also discovers that the bitter Doc, reticent about his past, used to race as the legendary Fabulous Hudson Hornet until a disastrous crash ended his career, with three Piston Cup championships on his record. McQueen is dumbfounded when Doc sees his three Piston Cup trophies as meaningless.

McQueen finishes repaving the road, but decides to spend an extra day in Radiator Springs to help the townsfolk and local businesses. Doc, still feeling resentful towards McQueen, alerts the media to his location, leading them and Mack to descend on the town and force McQueen to leave in time for the race. Doc soon regrets his actions after seeing the residents saddened by McQueen's sudden departure. At the Los Angeles International Speedway, a distracted McQueen initially struggles but is reinvigorated by the surprise arrival of his friends from Radiator Springs, who act as his pit crew.

With Doc taking over from Mack as crew chief, McQueen stages a remarkable comeback. Chick, refusing to finish last, employs a PIT maneuver that intentionally damages the King, rendering him unable to continue. Reminded of Doc's career-ending wreck, McQueen halts before the finish line and turns back to push the King across, allowing Chick to win the Piston Cup while ensuring the King's safe finish.

The crowd and media condemn Chick's victory and praise McQueen's integrity and sportsmanship. McQueen is offered the Dinoco sponsorship, but declines due to newfound loyalty to Rust-eze. Returning to Radiator Springs, McQueen reunites with Sally and declares his intention to establish his racing headquarters there, revitalizing the town.

== Voice cast ==
- Owen Wilson as Lightning McQueen, a red 2006 racecar who is described by John Lasseter in the Los Angeles Times as "a hybrid between a stock car and a more curvaceous Le Mans endurance race car"
- Paul Newman as Doc Hudson, a navy-blue 1951 Hudson Hornet who is later revealed to be the legendary Fabulous Hudson Hornet
- Bonnie Hunt as Sally Carrera, a sky-blue 2002 Porsche 911 Carrera
- Michael Keaton as Chick Hicks, a green racecar described by Pixar as a generic 1980s stock car who is Lightning McQueen's rival
- Larry the Cable Guy as Tow Mater, a rusty blue tow truck inspired by a 1951 International Harvester L-170 "boom" truck and a mid-1950s Chevrolet Task Force
- Cheech Marin as Ramone, a custom 1959 Chevrolet Impala Lowrider who has different colors in each sequence of the film
- Tony Shalhoub as Luigi, a yellow 1959 Fiat 500
- Michael Wallis as Sheriff, a 1949 Mercury Eight Coupe (police package)
- George Carlin as Fillmore, an aquamarine 1963 Volkswagen Type 2
- Paul Dooley as Sarge, a 1941 Willys jeep in the style of U.S. military usage
- Jenifer Lewis as Flo, an aquamarine 1957 General Motors Motorama show car
- Guido Quaroni as Guido, a blue forklift who resembles a BMW Isetta at the front and speaks only Italian
- Richard Petty as Strip "The King" Weathers, a blue 1970 Plymouth Superbird stock car
- Katherine Helmond as Lizzie, a black 1923 Ford Model T
- John Ratzenberger as Mack, a custom red 1985 Mack Super-Liner
- Joe Ranft as Red, an untalkative 1960s-style, red and silver fire engine—the design most closely resembles a mid-1960s truck—and Jerry Recycled Batteries, a grumpy red cab-over Peterbilt who Lightning mistakes for Mack while he is lost. These were Ranft's last two voice roles before his death in August 2005.
- Jeremy Piven (US) / Jeremy Clarkson (UK) as Harv, Lightning McQueen's agent who is never seen on-screen
- Bob Costas as Bob Cutlass, a gray 1999 Oldsmobile Aurora and announcer for the Piston Cup races
- Darrell Waltrip as Darrell Cartrip, a gray, red, yellow and blue 1977 Chevrolet Monte Carlo and Piston Cup racing announcer
- Humpy Wheeler as Tex Dinoco, a gold 1975 Cadillac Coupe de Ville and owner of Dinoco
- Lynda Petty as Lynda Weathers, a Chrysler Town and Country station wagon and Strip Weathers's wife
- Dale Earnhardt Jr. as "Junior" #8, a generic stock car
- Michael Schumacher as Michael Schumacher Ferrari, a red Ferrari F430
- Tom and Ray Magliozzi as Rusty and Dusty Rust-eze, a 1963 Dodge Dart and a 1967 Dodge A100 who are the owners of Rust-eze
- Richard Kind and Edie McClurg as Van and Minny, a forest-green 2004 Saturn Relay and a violet 1996 Chrysler Town & Country
- Lindsey Collins and Elissa Knight as Mia and Tia, the red identical twin 1992 Mazda MX-5 (NA) sisters
- Mario Andretti as Mario Andretti #11, a 1967 Ford Fairlane
- Sarah Clark as Kori Turbowitz, a turquoise sports car resembling a 1997 Ford Puma and race announcer
- Jay Leno as Jay Limo, a blue Lincoln Town Car who appears in a cameo
- Scott Clark as Sven, a tan Hummer H1 who is Governor of California in the Cars Universe, based on former Governor of California Arnold Schwarzenegger
- Jonas Rivera as Boost, a violet Nissan Silvia who is the leader of the Tuner Gang
- E.J. Holowicki as DJ, a blue Scion XB and member of the Tuner Gang
- Adrian Ochoa as Wingo, a green and purple Mitsubishi Eclipse and member of the Tuner Gang
- Lou Romano as Snot Rod, an orange Plymouth Barracuda and member of the Tuner Gang who sneezes often
- Mike "No Name" Nelson as Not Chuck, a red forklift of Lightning McQueen's former racing team

Tom Hanks, Tim Allen, Billy Crystal, John Goodman, Dave Foley and Ratzenberger reprise their vocal roles from previous Pixar films during an end-credits sequence featuring automobile spoofs of Toy Story, Monsters, Inc. and A Bug's Life. Cars was the final Pixar film worked on by Joe Ranft, who died in an automobile crash a year before the film's release. The film was the second to be dedicated to his memory, after Corpse Bride. The memorial showed the roles he had done in the other films directed by John Lasseter during the credits. It was also Paul Newman's last non-documentary film role before his retirement in 2007 and death in 2008.

== Production ==
=== Development ===
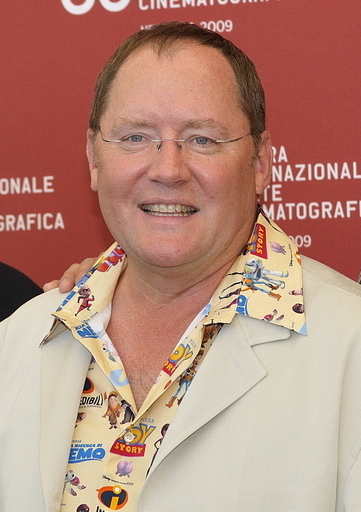
Writer and director John Lasseter in 2009

An animated film about cars was first discussed between director John Lasseter and character designer Bob Pauley as early as 1993, when carpooling during the production of Toy Story. Production designer Bill Cone recalled during that time, "John would say, 'Cars, Bob. One of these days we're going to make a movie with cars.'" Lasseter later had lunch with story artist Jorgen Klubien during the production of A Bug's Life, where Klubien told Lasseter that after having done something with toys and bugs, doing a film with cars as characters would be great. "After all those conversations with Bob, I thought that was a great idea", Lasseter stated, he and Klubien both having been fans of Disney's animated short film Susie the Little Blue Coupe (1952), and sent Klubien off to develop the film.

Klubien began writing a new script called The Yellow Car that was about an electric car living in a gas-guzzling world inspired by The Ugly Duckling, an idea triggered by the poor reception his fellow countrymen gave the Mini-El car. Some of the original drawings and characters were developed in 1998, and major script changes, such as giving Mater, Doc and a few other characters bigger parts, were made later.

Lasseter said inspiration for the film's story came after he took a cross-country road trip with his wife and five sons in 2000. When he returned to the studio after vacation, he contacted Michael Wallis, a Route 66 historian. Wallis led eleven Pixar animators in rented white Cadillacs on two different road trips across the route to research the film. In 2001, the film's working title was Route 66, but the title was changed to Cars to avoid confusion with the 1960s Route 66 television series. In addition, Lightning McQueen's racing number was originally to be 57—a reference to 1957, Lasseter's birth year—but was changed to 95 (a reference to 1995, the year Pixar's first feature film Toy Story was released).

In 2006, Lasseter spoke about the inspiration for the film, saying, "I have always loved cars. In one vein, I have Disney blood, and in the other, there's motor oil. The notion of combining these two great passions in my life—cars and animation—was irresistible. When Joe (Ranft) and I first started talking about this film in 1998, we knew we wanted to do something with cars as characters. Around that same time, we watched a documentary called 'Divided Highways,' which dealt with the interstate highway and how it affected the small towns along the way. We were so moved by it and began thinking about what it must have been like in these small towns that got bypassed. That's when we started really researching Route 66, but we still hadn't quite figured out what the story for the film was going to be. I used to travel that highway with my family as a child when we visited our family in St. Louis."

=== Animation ===
An unrendered frame from the development of the film

For the cars themselves, Lasseter visited the design studios of the Big Three Detroit automakers, particularly J Mays of Ford Motor Company. Lasseter learned how cars were designed.

In 2006, Lasseter spoke about the process of making an animation believable, saying, "It took many months of trial and error, and practicing test animation, to figure out how each car moves and how their world works. Our supervising animators, Doug Sweetland and Scott Clark, and the directing animators, Bobby Podesta and James Ford Murphy, did an amazing job working with the animation team to determine the unique movements for each character based on its age and the type of car it was. Some cars are like sports cars and they're much tighter in their suspension. Others are older '50s cars that are a lot looser and have more bounce to them. We wanted to get that authenticity in there but also to make sure each car had a unique personality. We also wanted each animator to be able to put some of themself in the character and give it their own spin. Every day in dailies, it was so much fun because we would see things that we had never seen in our lives. The world of cars came alive in a believable and unexpected way."

Unlike most anthropomorphic cars, the eyes of the cars in this film were placed on the windshield (which resembles the Tonka Talking Trucks, the characters from Tex Avery's One Cab's Family short and Disney's own Susie the Little Blue Coupe), rather than within the headlights. According to production designer Bob Pauley, "From the very beginning of this project, John Lasseter had it in his mind to have the eyes be in the windshield. For one thing, it separates our characters from the more common approach where you have little cartoon eyes in the headlights. For another, he thought that having the eyes down near the mouth at the front end of the car feels more like a snake. With the eyes set in the windshield, the point of view is more human-like, and made it feel like the whole car could be involved in the animation of the character." This decision was facetiously criticized by automotive blog Jalopnik.

In 2006, the supervising animator of the film, Scott Clark, spoke about the challenges of animating car characters, saying, "Getting a full range of performance and emotion from these characters and making them still seem like cars was a tough assignment, but that's what animation does best. You use your imagination, and you make the movements and gestures fit with the design. Our car characters may not have arms and legs, but we can lean the tires in or out to suggest hands opening up or closing in. We can use steering to point a certain direction. We also designed a special eyelid and an eyebrow for the windshield that lets us communicate an expressiveness that cars don't have."

Doug Sweetland, who also served as supervising animator, spoke of the challenges, saying, "It took a different kind of animator to really be able to interpret the Cars models, than it did to interpret something like The Incredibles models. With The Incredibles, the animator could get reference for the characters by shooting himself and watching the footage. But with Cars, it departs completely from any reference. Yes they're cars, but no car can do what our characters do. It's pure fantasy. It took a lot of trial and error to get them to look right."

Lasseter also explained the film started with pencil and paper designs, saying, "Truth to materials. Starting with pencil-and-paper designs from production designer Bob Pauley, and continuing through the modeling, articulation, and shading of the characters, and finally into animation, the production team worked hard to have the car characters remain true to their origins."

Character department manager Jay Ward explained how they wanted the cars to look as realistic as possible, saying, "John didn't want the cars to seem clay-like or mushy. He insisted on truth to materials. This was a huge thing for him. He told us that steel needs to feel like steel. Glass should feel like glass. These cars need to feel heavy. They weigh three or four thousand pounds. When they move around, they need to have that feel. They shouldn't appear light or overly bouncy to the point where the audience might see them as rubber toys."

According to directing animator James Ford Murphy, "Originally, the car models were built so they could basically do anything. John kept reminding us that these characters are made of metal and they weigh several thousand pounds. They can't stretch. He showed us examples of very loose animation to illustrate what not to do."

Thomas Jordan, the film's character shading supervisor, explained that "Chrome and car paint were our two main challenges on this film. We started out by learning as much as we could. At the local body shop, we watched them paint a car, and we saw the way they mixed the paint and applied the various coats. We tried to dissect what goes into the real paint and recreated it in the computer. We figured out that we needed a base paint, which is where the color comes from, and the clearcoat, which provides the reflection. We were then able to add in things like metallic flake to give it a glittery sparkle, a pearlescent quality that might change color depending on the angle, and even a layer of pin-striping for characters like Ramone."

Supervising technical director on the film Eben Ostby explained the biggest challenge for the technical team was creating the metallic and painted surfaces of the car characters, and the reflections those surfaces generate, saying, "Given that the stars of our film are made of metal, John had a real desire to see realistic reflections, and more beautiful lighting than we've seen in any of our previous films. In the past, we've mostly used environment maps and other matte-based technology to cheat reflections, but for Cars we added a ray-tracing capability to our existing Renderman program to raise the bar for Pixar."

Rendering lead Jessica McMackin spoke about the use of ray tracing on the film, saying, "In addition to creating accurate reflections, we used ray tracing to achieve other effects. We were able to use this approach to create accurate shadows, like when there are multiple light sources and you want to get a feathering of shadows at the edges. Or occlusion, which is the absence of ambient light between two surfaces, like a crease in a shirt. A fourth use is irradiance. An example of this would be if you had a piece of red paper and held it up to a white wall, the light would be colored by the paper and cast a red glow on the wall."

Character supervisor Tim Milliron explained the film uses a ground-locking system that kept the cars firmly planted on the road, saying, "The ground-locking system is one of the things I'm most proud of on this film. In the past, characters have never known about their environment in any way. A simulation pass was required if you wanted to make something like that happen. On Cars, this system is built into the models themselves, and as you move the car around, the vehicle sticks to the ground. It was one of those things that we do at Pixar where we knew going in that it had to be done, but we had no idea how to do it."

Technical director Lisa Forsell explained that to enhance the richness and beauty of the desert landscapes surrounding Radiator Springs, the filmmakers created a department responsible for matte paintings and sky flats, saying, "Digital matte paintings are a way to get a lot of visual complexity without necessarily having to build complex geometry, and write complex shaders. We spent a lot of time working on the clouds and their different formations. They tend to be on several layers and they move relative to each other. The clouds do in fact have some character and personality. The notion was that just as people see themselves in the clouds, cars see various car-shaped clouds. It's subtle, but there are definitely some that are shaped like a sedan. And if you look closely, you'll see some that look like tire treads. The fact that so much attention is put on the skies speaks to the visual level of the film. Is there a story point? Not really. There is no pixel on the screen that does not have an extraordinary level of scrutiny and care applied to it. There is nothing that is just throw-away."

Computers used in the development of the film were four times faster than those used in The Incredibles and 1,000 times faster than those used in Toy Story. To build the cars, the animators used computer platforms similar to those used in the design of real-world automobiles.

== Soundtrack ==
The Cars soundtrack was released by Walt Disney Records on June 6, 2006. Nine tracks on the soundtrack are by popular artists, while the remaining eleven are score cues by Randy Newman. It has two versions of the classic Bobby Troup jazz standard "Route 66" (popularized by Nat King Cole), one by Chuck Berry and a new version recorded specifically for the film's credits performed by John Mayer. Brad Paisley contributed two of the nine tracks to the album, one being "Find Yourself" used for the end credits.

== Cultural references ==
Cars has many references to American road culture, racing legends, and automotive subcultures and stereotypes.

- Real-life ghost towns and landmarks along historic Route 66 inspire the fictional town of Radiator Springs.
- The characters and architecture mirror roadside Americana, with mid-century-style motels, cone-shaped architecture, and classic gas stations.
- Monument Valley turns into Ornament Valley.
- Ramone is a 1959 Chevrolet Impala lowrider with their heavy customization and artistry put into those vehicles by Latino lowrider communities.

There are also some Pixar Easter Eggs and crossovers.

== Release ==
Cars was originally going to be released on November 4, 2005, but on December 7, 2004, its release date was moved to June 9, 2006. Analysts looked at the release date change as a sign from Pixar that they were preparing for the pending end of the Disney distribution contract by either preparing non-Disney materials to present to other studios or they were buying time to see what happened with Michael Eisner's situation at Disney. When Pixar's then-chief executive Steve Jobs announced the release date, he stated the reasoning was due to wanting to put all Pixar films on a summer release schedule with DVD sales occurring during the Christmas season.

Cars was theatrically re-released in the United States on September 4, 2026, to commemorate the film's 20th anniversary.

=== Home media ===
Cars was released on VHS and DVD, in both its original theatrical 2.39:1 anamorphic widescreen aspect ratio and an open matte 1:33.1 fullscreen edition, on November 7, 2006, in the United States and Canada. It was also released on October 25, 2006, in Australia and New Zealand and on November 27, 2006, in the United Kingdom. The release includes the DVD-exclusive short film Mater and the Ghostlight and the film's theatrical short One Man Band, as well as a 16-minute-long documentary about the film titled Inspiration for Cars, which features director John Lasseter. This THX certified release features an Easter egg in the main menu that is a 45-second clip showing a Cars version of Boundin'.

According to the Walt Disney Company, five million copies of the DVD were sold in the first two days it was available. During the first week, it sold 6,250,856 units and 15,370,791 in total ($246,198,859). The film also topped that week's DVD sales chart, above Little Man and Mission: Impossible III. Unlike previous Pixar DVD releases, there is no two-disc special edition, and no plans to release one. According to Sara Maher, DVD Production Manager at Pixar, John Lasseter and Pixar were preoccupied with productions like Ratatouille.

In the US and Canada, there were bonus discs available with the purchase of the film at Wal-Mart and Target. The former features a "Geared-Up Bonus DVD Disc" that focuses on the music of the film, including the music video of "Life Is a Highway", The Making of "Life Is a Highway", Cars: The Making of the Music, and Under The Hood, a special that originally aired on the ABC Family cable channel. The latter's bonus was a "Rev'd Up DVD Disc" that featured material mostly already released as part of the official Cars podcast and focusing on the inspiration and production of the movie.

Cars was released on Blu-ray on November 6, 2007, one year after the DVD release. It was the first Pixar film to be released on Blu-ray (with Ratatouille and Pixar Short Films Collection, Volume 1), and was re-released as a Blu-ray and DVD combo pack and DVD-only edition in April 2011. The film was released in 3D on October 29, 2013, as part of Cars: Ultimate Collector's Edition, which included the releases on Blu-ray, Blu-ray 3D, and DVD. In 2019, Cars was released on 4K Ultra HD Blu-ray.

== Reception ==
=== Box office ===
In its opening weekend, Cars earned $60.1 million in 3,985 theaters in the United States, ranking number one at the box office, beating The Break-Up, X-Men: The Last Stand and The Omen. For three years, it held the record for having the highest opening weekend for any car-oriented film until it was surpassed by Fast & Furious in 2009. In the United States, the film held onto the number one spot for two weeks before being surpassed by Click and by Superman Returns the following weekend.

The film earned $33.7 million during its second weekend, competing with The Fast and the Furious: Tokyo Drift, Nacho Libre and The Lake House. By July 2006, it approached the $200 million mark, becoming the third film of the year to do so, following X-Men: The Last Stand and The Da Vinci Code. It grossed $464.2 million worldwide, including $244.1 million in the United States and Canada. Cars was the second-highest-grossing animated film of 2006, behind Ice Age: The Meltdown.

In the UK, Cars managed to beat Pirates of the Caribbean: Dead Man's Chest to claim the number one spot, earning $3.4 million in its opening weekend. It would be overtaken by Miami Vice in its second weekend, but earned $2.3 million. The film reclaimed the top spot with $1.3 million during its third weekend, outgrossing the newly-released Monster House and Nacho Libre.

The film grossed $6.1 million during its 20th anniversary re-release, finishing in sixth place for its opening weekend. The re-release earned $11.1 million in the U.S. and Canada and $22.8 million worldwide, bringing its total in the U.S. and Canada to $255.2 million and its worldwide gross to $484.8 million.

=== Critical response ===
On Rotten Tomatoes, the film has an approval rating of 74%, based on 199 reviews, with an average rating of 6.9/10. The website's critics consensus reads, "Cars offers visual treats that more than compensate for its somewhat thinly written story, adding up to a satisfying diversion for younger viewers." On Metacritic, the film has a score of 73 out of 100, based on 39 critics reviews, indicating "generally favorable" reviews. Audiences polled by CinemaScore gave the film an average grade of "A" on a scale of A+ to F. William Arnold of the Seattle Post-Intelligencer praised it as "one of Pixar's most imaginative and thoroughly appealing movies ever", while Lisa Schwarzbaum of Entertainment Weekly called it "a work of American art as classic as it is modern".

Roger Ebert of the Chicago Sun-Times gave the film three stars out of four, saying it "tells a bright and cheery story, and then has a little something profound lurking around the edges. In this case, it's a sense of loss." Peter Travers of Rolling Stone awarded the film three-and-a-half stars out of four, saying, "Fueled with plenty of humor, action, heartfelt drama, and amazing new technical feats, Cars is a high octane delight for moviegoers of all ages."

Brian Lowry of Variety offered a more critical assessment of the film, stating: "Despite representing another impressive technical achievement, it's the least visually interesting of the computer-animation boutique's movies, and—in an ironic twist for a story about auto racing—drifts slowly through its semi-arid midsection."

Robert Wilonsky of The Village Voice was also complimentary of the picture, saying, "What ultimately redeems Cars from turning out a total lemon is its soul. Lasseter loves these animated inanimate objects as though they were kin, and it shows in every beautifully rendered frame." Kenneth Turan of the Los Angeles Times likewise conferred praise onto Cars, saying, "What's surprising about this supremely engaging film is the source of its curb appeal: It has heart."

=== Accolades ===
Cars had a highly successful run during the 2006 awards season. Many film critic associations such as the Broadcast Film Critics Association and the National Board of Review named it the best Animated Feature Film of 2006. Cars also received the title of Best Reviewed Animated Feature of 2006 from Rotten Tomatoes. Randy Newman received a Grammy Award for Best Song Written for Visual Media for the song "Our Town", which went on to be nominated for the Academy Award for Best Original Song (an award it lost to "I Need to Wake Up" from An Inconvenient Truth).

The film earned an Oscar nomination for Best Animated Feature with Monster House, but both films lost to Happy Feet. Cars was selected as the Favorite Family Movie at the 33rd People's Choice Awards. The most prestigious award that Cars received was the inaugural Golden Globe Award for Best Animated Feature Film. Cars won the highest award for animation in 2006, the Best Animated Feature Annie Award. In 2008, the American Film Institute nominated Cars for its Top 10 Animation Films list. In 2025, it was one of the films voted for the "Readers' Choice" edition of The New York Times' list of "The 100 Best Movies of the 21st Century", finishing at number 322.

== Video game ==
A video game was released on June 6, 2006, for Game Boy Advance, Microsoft Windows, Nintendo DS, GameCube, PlayStation 2, PlayStation Portable, and Xbox. It was also released on October 23, 2006, for Xbox 360 and November 16, 2006, for Wii.

Much like the film, the video game got mainly positive reviews. GameSpot gave it 7.0 out of 10 for Xbox 360, Wii, and PlayStation 2 versions, 7.6 out of 10 for the GameCube and Xbox versions, and 7.4 out of 10 for the PSP version. Metacritic gave 65 out of 100 for the Wii version, 54 out of 100 for the DS version, 73 out of 100 for the PC version, 71 out of 100 for the PlayStation 2 version, and 70 out of 100 for the PSP version.

== Similar films ==
Marco Aurélio Canônico of Folha de S.Paulo described The Little Cars series (Os Carrinhos in Portuguese), a Brazilian computer graphics film series by Vídeo Brinquedo, as a derivative of Cars. Canônico discussed whether lawsuits from Pixar would appear. The Brazilian Ministry of Culture posted Marcus Aurelius Canônico's article on its website.

It has also been noted that the plot of Cars mirrors Doc Hollywood, a 1991 romantic comedy that stars Michael J. Fox as a young doctor who acquires an appreciation for small town values and falls in love with a local law student, a result of being sentenced to work at the local town hospital after causing a traffic accident. Some allege that the makers of Cars plagiarized the script of Doc Hollywood.

== Literature ==
- 2006: CARS: The Junior Novelization, RH/Disney, ISBN 978-0736422918

== Expanded franchise ==
=== Sequels ===
The first sequel, titled Cars 2, was released on June 24, 2011. It was directed by John Lasseter, who conceived its story while traveling worldwide to promote the first film. In the sequel, Lightning McQueen and Mater head to Japan and Europe to compete in the World Grand Prix, but Mater becomes sidetracked with international espionage.

The second sequel, titled Cars 3, was released on June 16, 2017. Directed by Brian Fee, the film focuses on Lightning McQueen, now a veteran racer who, after being overshadowed by a new generation of racecars, receives help from Cruz Ramirez, a young performance coupe, to instruct him in the increasingly high-tech world and defeat his new rival Jackson Storm.

=== Spin-offs ===
An animated feature film spin-off called Planes, produced by DisneyToon Studios, was released on August 9, 2013. A sequel to Planes, titled Planes: Fire & Rescue, was released on July 18, 2014.

=== Television series ===
Cars also spawned a television series of short films titled Cars Toons that ran from October 27, 2008, to June 5, 2012 (as Mater's Tall Tales), and March 22, 2013, to May 20, 2014 (as Tales from Radiator Springs). A Disney+ streaming series titled Cars on the Road premiered on September 8, 2022.

== See also ==
- Mandeville-Anthony v. Walt Disney Co., a federal court case in which Mandeville claimed Disney infringed on his copyrighted ideas by creating Cars
