= Oliver Ojakäär =

Estonian tennis player (born 2005)

- Country (sports): Estonia
- Born: 10 February 2005 (age 21) Tartu, Estonia
- Height: 1.91 m (6 ft 3 in)
- Plays: Right-handed (two-handed backhand)
- College: University of Texas
- Coach: Kenneth Raisma
- Prize money: US $14,744

Singles
- Career record: 3–0 (at ATP Tour level, Grand Slam level, and in Davis Cup)
- Career titles: 0
- Highest ranking: No. 869 (18 March 2024)
- Current ranking: No. 1,040 (9 November 2026)

Doubles
- Career record: 0–1 (at ATP Tour level, Grand Slam level, and in Davis Cup)
- Career titles: 0
- Highest ranking: No. 1,151 (27 October 2025)
- Current ranking: No. 1,449 (9 November 2026)
- Last updated on: 9 November 2026.

Oliver Ojakäär (born 10 February 2005) is an Estonian professional tennis player. He has a career-high ATP singles ranking of No. 869, achieved on 18 March 2024. Ojakäär won the 2023 US Open – Boys' doubles title with Max Dahlin.

He represents Estonia at the Davis Cup. He attended the University of Texas in the United States, on a scholarship starting in the spring of 2025.

== Early life ==
Ojakäär was born in Tartu, Estonia. He started taking tennis lessons in his early childhood, at the Club MK Tennis.

== Junior career ==
He won his first junior ITF tournament in 2021 in Jūrmala, Latvia. He started 2023 with a junior ranking of world No. 55.

Coached by former junior grand slam champion Kenneth Raisma, Ojakäär made his major junior debut at the 2023 Australian Open. He reached the last-16 of the boys' singles and the quarter finals of the boys' doubles in Melbourne. Later that season, he won the boys' doubles category at the 2023 US Open, playing alongside Max Dahlin. The pair defeated sixth seeds Federico Bondioli and Joel Schwärzler in the final. In doing so, Ojakäär became the fourth Estonian to triumph in a Grand Slam Junior tournament after Toomas Leius at the 1959 Wimbledon Junior tournament, Kaia Kanepi at the 2001 French Open, and Ojakäär's own coach Raisma who won Wimbledon Junior with Stefanos Tsitsipas in 2016.

Ojakäär had good results on the ITF junior circuit, maintaining a 92–47 singles win-loss record. He reached an ITF junior combined ranking of world No. 10 on 5 June 2023.

== Profissional career ==
Ojakäär played alongside his coach Kenneth Raisma at the Alexela Team Cup in Tallinn, Estonia in November 2023.

In February 2024, he reached his first ITF Tour final at M15 Sharm-el-Sheikh, Egypt. He defeated local player Mohamed Safwat in the semi-finals, before losing to Czech Marek Gengel in the final.

== ITF World Tennis Tour finals ==
=== Singles: 2 (2 runner-ups) ===
| Legend ITF WTT (0–2) |

| Result | W–L | Date | Tournament | Tier | Surface | Opponent | Score |
|---|---|---|---|---|---|---|---|
| Loss | 0–1 | Feb 2024 | M15 Sharm El Sheikh, Egypt | WTT | Hard | (Czech Republic) Marek Gengel | 3–6, 3–6 |
| Loss | 0–2 | Jun 2026 | M15 Lakewood, US | WTT | Hard | (United Kingdom) Oliver Bonding | 5–7, 6–7^{(1–7)} |

=== Doubles: 2 (1 title, 1 runner-up) ===
| Legend ITF WTT (1–1) |

| Result | W–L | Date | Tournament | Tier | Surface | Partner | Opponents | Score |
|---|---|---|---|---|---|---|---|---|
| Loss | 0–1 | Nov 2024 | M15 Sharm El Sheikh, Egypt | WTT | Hard | (Estonia) Markus Mölder | (Japan) Yuta Kikuchi (Japan) Yamato Sueoka | 2–6, 3–6 |
| Win | 1–1 | Sep 2025 | M15 Hurghada, Egypt | WTT | Hard | (Egypt) Karim Ibrahim | (Italy) Lorenzo Lorusso (South Africa) Kris van Wyk | 6–2, 6–7^{(6–8)}, [11–9] |

== Junior Grand Slam finals ==
=== Doubles: 1 (title) ===
| Result | Year | Tournament | Surface | Partner | Opponents | Score |
|---|---|---|---|---|---|---|
| Win | 2023 | US Open | Hard | (Sweden) Max Dahlin | (Italy) Federico Bondioli (Austria) Joel Schwärzler | 3–6, 6–3, [11–9] |
