= 2011 Bella Cup – Singles =

Singles
- 2011 Bella Cup

Final
- Champion: (Romania) Edina Gallovits-Hall
- Runner-up: (France) Stéphanie Foretz Gacon
- Score: 6–4, 6–3

Events
Singles	Doubles
← 2010 ·	Bella Cup	· 2012 →

Ksenia Pervak was the defending champion, but is still competing at Wimbledon.
Edina Gallovits-Hall defeated Stéphanie Foretz Gacon in the final 6–4, 6–3.

== Seeds ==
1. (Russia) Anastasia Pivovarova (second round)
2. (Austria) Patricia Mayr-Achleitner (second round)
3. (Romania) Edina Gallovits-Hall (champion)
4. (France) Stéphanie Foretz Gacon (final)
5. (Italy) Corinna Dentoni (first round)
6. (China) Han Xinyun (second round)
7. (Ukraine) Yulia Beygelzimer (second round)
8. (Romania) Mădălina Gojnea (semifinals)

== Main draw ==
=== Key ===
- Q = Qualifier
- WC = Wild card
- LL = Lucky loser
- Alt = Alternate
- SE = Special exempt
- PR = Protected ranking
- ITF = ITF entry
- JE = Junior exempt
- w/o = Walkover
- r = Retired
- d = Defaulted
- SR = Special ranking

=== Finals ===
Semifinals
8	(Romania) Mădălina Gojnea	2	2
4	(France) Stéphanie Foretz Gacon	6	6
3	(Romania) Edina Gallovits-Hall	6^{4}	7	6
(Romania) Elena Bogdan	7	6^{2}	2

Final
4	(France) Stéphanie Foretz Gacon	4	3
3	(Romania) Edina Gallovits-Hall	6	6

=== Top half ===
First round
1	(Russia) A Pivovarova	6	6
(Ukraine) I Buryachok	3	0
(Argentina) P Ormaechea	6^{8}	6	6
(Hungary) R-L Jani	7	2	1
(Russia) E Ivanova	6	6
WC	(Poland) K Kawa	3	2
(Czech Republic) Ka Plíšková	6	6^{4}	3
8	(Romania) M Gojnea	1	7	6
4	(France) S Foretz Gacon	4	6	7
(Poland) M Domachowska	6	3	5
WC	(Poland) M Magusiak	1	3
Q	(Slovakia) M Pochabová	6	6
(Poland) K Piter	1	0
(Poland) M Linette	6	6
JE	(Ukraine) E Svitolina	4	2
6	(China) X Han	6	6

Second round
1	(Russia) A Pivovarova	0	1
(Argentina) P Ormaechea	6	6
(Russia) E Ivanova	4	3
8	(Romania) M Gojnea	6	6
4	(France) S Foretz Gacon	6	6
Q	(Slovakia) M Pochabová	4	0
(Poland) M Linette	2	6	7
6	(China) X Han	6	3	5

Quarterfinals
(Argentina) P Ormaechea	6	5	0
8	(Romania) M Gojnea	4	7	6
4	(France) S Foretz Gacon	6	6
(Poland) M Linette	4	3

Semifinals
8	(Romania) M Gojnea	2	2
4	(France) S Foretz Gacon	6	6

=== Bottom half ===
First round
7	(Ukraine) Y Beygelzimer	6	6
(Slovenia) A Klepač	3	3
(Romania) L Ungur	6	6
Q	(Ukraine) N Kolb	4	4
Q	(Poland) A Korzeniak	2	3
(Russia) E Bychkova	6	6
(Germany) T Malek	3	3
3	(Romania) E Gallovits-Hall	6	6
5	(Italy) C Dentoni	2	6	2
Q	(Japan) C Takayama	6	4	6
WC	(Poland) P Kania	6	6
WC	(Poland) K Kapustka	1	0
(Romania) E Bogdan	6	6
(Netherlands) K Bertens	3	1
(Czech Republic) Kr Plíšková	2	4
2	(Austria) P Mayr-Achleitner	6	6

Second round
7	(Ukraine) Y Beygelzimer	3	3
(Romania) L Ungur	6	6
(Russia) E Bychkova	3	3
3	(Romania) E Gallovits-Hall	6	6
Q	(Japan) C Takayama	3	0	r
WC	(Poland) P Kania	6	1
(Romania) E Bogdan	7	6^{3}	6
2	(Austria) P Mayr-Achleitner	6^{4}	7	4

Quarterfinals
(Romania) L Ungur	0	6	3
3	(Romania) E Gallovits-Hall	6	3	6
WC	(Poland) P Kania	6	1	3
(Romania) E Bogdan	1	6	6

Semifinals
3	(Romania) E Gallovits-Hall	6^{4}	7	6
(Romania) E Bogdan	7	6^{2}	2
