= 2011 Bella Cup – Doubles =

Doubles
- 2011 Bella Cup

Final
- Champion: (France) Stéphanie Foretz Gacon (Germany) Tatjana Malek
- Runner-up: (Romania) Edina Gallovits-Hall (Slovenia) Andreja Klepač
- Score: 6–2, 7–5

Events
Singles	Doubles
← 2010 ·	Bella Cup	· 2012 →

Teodora Mirčić and Marija Mirkovic were the defending champions, but both chose not to participate.
Stéphanie Foretz Gacon and Tatjana Malek won the tournament by defeating Edina Gallovits-Hall and Andreja Klepač in the final 6–2, 7–5.

== Seeds ==
1. (Romania) Edina Gallovits-Hall / (Slovenia) Andreja Klepač (final)
2. (France) Stéphanie Foretz Gacon / (Germany) Tatjana Malek (champions)
3. (Romania) Elena Bogdan / (Russia) Anastasia Pivovarova (semifinals)
4. (Ukraine) Yulia Beygelzimer / (Russia) Ekaterina Ivanova (first round)

== Draw ==
=== Key ===
- Q = Qualifier
- WC = Wild card
- LL = Lucky loser
- Alt = Alternate
- SE = Special exempt
- PR = Protected ranking
- ITF = ITF entry
- JE = Junior exempt
- w/o = Walkover
- r = Retired
- d = Defaulted
- SR = Special ranking

=== Draw ===
First round
1	(Romania) E Gallovits-Hall (Slovenia) A Klepač	6	6
WC	(Romania) I-A Iova (Poland) M Sekrecka	1	2
(Poland) P Kania (Poland) M Linette	6	3	[9]
(Ukraine) I Buryachok (China) X Han	1	6	[11]
4	(Ukraine) Y Beygelzimer (Russia) E Ivanova	4	6	[6]
(Poland) K Kosińska (Poland) S Zagórska	6	4	[10]
(Poland) K Piter (Poland) B Sobaszkiewicz	6	6
(Poland) A Barańska (Poland) J Nalborska	2	0
(Poland) O Brózda (Poland) N Kołat	6	7
(Poland) J Jegiołka (Poland) K Kawa	3	5
(Czech Republic) Ka Plíšková (Czech Republic) Kr Plíšková	2	6^{4}
3	(Romania) E Bogdan (Russia) A Pivovarova	6	7
(Romania) M Gojnea (Romania) L Ungur	7	6
WC	(Poland) M Kiszczyńska (Japan) C Takayama	6^{4}	3
(Argentina) P Ormaechea (Ukraine) E Svitolina	0	2
2	(France) S Foretz Gacon (Germany) T Malek	6	6

Quarterfinals
1	(Romania) E Gallovits-Hall (Slovenia) A Klepač	7	6
(Ukraine) I Buryachok (China) X Han	5	2
(Poland) K Kosińska (Poland) S Zagórska	7	4	[4]
(Poland) K Piter (Poland) B Sobaszkiewicz	5	6	[10]
(Poland) O Brózda (Poland) N Kołat	3	7	[9]
3	(Romania) E Bogdan (Russia) A Pivovarova	6	5	[11]
(Romania) M Gojnea (Romania) L Ungur	4	3
2	(France) S Foretz Gacon (Germany) T Malek	6	6

Semifinals
1	(Romania) E Gallovits-Hall (Slovenia) A Klepač	6	6
(Poland) K Piter (Poland) B Sobaszkiewicz	2	4
3	(Romania) E Bogdan (Russia) A Pivovarova	6^{4}	3
2	(France) S Foretz Gacon (Germany) T Malek	7	6

Finals
1	(Romania) E Gallovits-Hall (Slovenia) A Klepač	2	5
2	(France) S Foretz Gacon (Germany) T Malek	6	7
