= 2011 Bella Cup =

Tennis tournament

- Date: June 27 – July 3
- Edition: 12th
- Location: Toruń, Poland

Champions

Singles
- (Romania) Edina Gallovits-Hall

Doubles
- (France) Stéphanie Foretz Gacon / (Germany) Tatjana Malek
- Bella Cup

The 2011 Bella Cup was a professional tennis tournament played on outdoor clay courts. It was part of the 2011 ITF Women's Circuit. It took place in Toruń, Poland between June 27 and July 3, 2011.

== WTA entrants ==
=== Seeds ===
Nationality	Player	Ranking*	Seeding
RUS	Anastasia Pivovarova	114	1
AUT	Patricia Mayr-Achleitner	115	2
ROU	Edina Gallovits-Hall	125	3
FRA	Stéphanie Foretz Gacon	139	4
ITA	Corinna Dentoni	146	5
CHN	Han Xinyun	151	6
UKR	Yuliya Beygelzimer	156	7
ROU	Mădălina Gojnea	158	8

- Rankings are as of June 20, 2011.

=== Other entrants ===
The following players received wildcards into the singles main draw:

- (Poland) Paula Kania
- (Poland) Katarzyna Kapustka
- (Poland) Katarzyna Kawa
- (Poland) Monika Magusiak

The following players received entry from the qualifying draw:

- (Ukraine) Nadya Kolb
- (Poland) Anna Korzeniak
- (Slovakia) Michaela Pochabová
- (Japan) Chihiro Takayama

== Champions ==
=== Singles ===
(Romania) Edina Gallovits-Hall def. (France) Stéphanie Foretz Gacon, 6–4, 6–3

=== Doubles ===
(France) Stéphanie Foretz Gacon / (Germany) Tatjana Malek def. (Romania) Edina Gallovits-Hall / (Slovenia) Andreja Klepač, 6–2, 7–5
