= 2019 Bella Cup – Doubles =

Doubles
- 2019 Bella Cup

Final
- Champions: (Spain) Rebeka Masarova (Slovakia) Rebecca Šramková
- Runners-up: (United States) Robin Anderson (Ukraine) Anhelina Kalinina
- Score: 6–4, 3–6, [10–4]

Events
Singles	Doubles
← 2018 ·	Bella Cup	· 2020 →

Maja Chwalińska and Katarzyna Kawa were the defending champions, but chose not to participate.

Rebeka Masarova and Rebecca Šramková won the title, defeating Robin Anderson and Anhelina Kalinina in the final, 6–4, 3–6, [10–4].

== Seeds ==
1. (Montenegro) Danka Kovinić / (Brazil) Laura Pigossi (semifinals)
2. (Chinese Taipei) Chen Pei-hsuan / (Chinese Taipei) Wu Fang-hsien (first round)
3. (Romania) Irina Bara / (Romania) Elena Bogdan (semifinals)
4. (United States) Robin Anderson / (Ukraine) Anhelina Kalinina (final)

== Draw ==
=== Key ===
- Q = Qualifier
- WC = Wild card
- LL = Lucky loser
- Alt = Alternate
- SE = Special exempt
- PR = Protected ranking
- ITF = ITF entry
- JE = Junior exempt
- w/o = Walkover
- r = Retired
- d = Defaulted
- SR = Special ranking

=== Draw ===
First round
1	(Montenegro) D Kovinić (Brazil) L Pigossi	6	6
(Poland) A Hertel (Poland) S Rogozińska Dzik	3	3
(Poland) W Falkowska (Poland) M Kubka	1	7^{7}	[10]
(Brazil) C Alves (United States) C Scholl	6	6^{4}	[6]
4	(United States) R Anderson (Ukraine) A Kalinina	6	6
(Lithuania) J Eidukonytė (Slovakia) L Svatíková	0	3
WC	(Poland) AJ Jeleń (Poland) J Zawadzka	6^{4}	6	[6]
WC	(Poland) J Oczachowska (Poland) Z Szczepańska	7^{7}	4	[10]
Alt	(Paraguay) L Escauriza (Spain) N Párrizas Díaz	4	5
(Australia) S Mendez (Chile) D Seguel	6	7
(Spain) R Vicens Mas (France) L Wargnier	2	2
3	(Romania) I Bara (Romania) E Bogdan	6	6
(Argentina) P Ormaechea (Australia) O Rogowska	4	4
(Spain) R Masarova (Slovakia) R Šramková	6	6
(Romania) M Bulgaru (Romania) G Talabă	6	3	[10]
2	(Chinese Taipei) P-h Chen (Chinese Taipei) F-h Wu	4	6	[5]

Quarterfinals
1	(Montenegro) D Kovinić (Brazil) L Pigossi	6	6
(Poland) W Falkowska (Poland) M Kubka	4	2
4	(United States) R Anderson (Ukraine) A Kalinina	6	6
WC	(Poland) J Oczachowska (Poland) Z Szczepańska	1	2
(Australia) S Mendez (Chile) D Seguel	3	4
3	(Romania) I Bara (Romania) E Bogdan	6	6
(Spain) R Masarova (Slovakia) R Šramková	7	6
(Romania) M Bulgaru (Romania) G Talabă	5	3

Semifinals
1	(Montenegro) D Kovinić (Brazil) L Pigossi	5	6	[8]
4	(United States) R Anderson (Ukraine) A Kalinina	7	2	[10]
3	(Romania) I Bara (Romania) E Bogdan	3	3
(Spain) R Masarova (Slovakia) R Šramková	6	6

Final
4	(United States) R Anderson (Ukraine) A Kalinina	4	6	[4]
(Spain) R Masarova (Slovakia) R Šramková	6	3	[10]
