= Bella Cup =

ITF Women's Tour
- Event name: Bella Cup
- Location: Toruń, Poland
- Venue: KS Start-Wisła Toruń
- Category: ITF Women's Circuit
- Surface: Clay
- Draw: 32S/32Q/16D
- Prize money: $60,000+H
- Website: bellacup.pl

The Bella Cup is a tournament for professional female tennis players played on outdoor clay courts, held annually in Toruń, Poland since 1996. The event is classified as a ITF Women's Circuit tournament. It was a $50k+H tournament in 2011. In 2019, it was upgraded to a $60,000+H event, after being at $25k level since 2012.

== Past finals ==
=== Singles ===
Year	Champion	Runner-up	Score
2020	cancelled due to the COVID-19 pandemic		
2019	(Slovakia) Rebecca Šramková	(Ukraine) Marta Kostyuk	6–1, 6–2
2018	(Czech Republic) Barbora Krejčíková	(Slovakia) Rebecca Šramková	7–5, 6–1
2017	(Slovakia) Chantal Škamlová	(Czech Republic) Miriam Kolodziejová	6–2, 4–6, 6–3
2016	(Bulgaria) Isabella Shinikova	(Slovenia) Tadeja Majerič	7–5, 4–6, 6–2
2015	(Slovakia) Kristína Kučová	(Italy) Giulia Gatto-Monticone	4–6, 6–1, 6–4
2014	(Czech Republic) Barbora Krejčíková	(Greece) Maria Sakkari	6–4, 6–1
2013	(Poland) Paula Kania	(Poland) Katarzyna Piter	6–4, 6–4
2012	(Montenegro) Danka Kovinić	(Poland) Paula Kania	6–3, 4–6, 6–3
2011	(Romania) Edina Gallovits-Hall	(France) Stéphanie Foretz	6–4, 6–3
2010	(Russia) Ksenia Pervak	(Poland) Magda Linette	6–4, 6–1
2009	(Georgia (country)) Oksana Kalashnikova	(Belarus) Ksenia Milevskaya	3–6, 6–4, 6–2
2008	(Belarus) Ekaterina Dzehalevich	(Slovakia) Dominika Nociarová	6–3, 2–6, 7–6^{(7–2)}
2007	(Switzerland) Stefanie Vögele	(Romania) Alexandra Dulgheru	6–2, 4–6, 7–5
2006	(Slovenia) Andreja Klepač	(Poland) Joanna Sakowicz	6–0, 6–2
2005	(Serbia and Montenegro) Ana Timotić	(Poland) Joanna Sakowicz	6–1, 6–2
2004	(Poland) Karolina Kosińska	(Poland) Magdalena Kiszczyńska	4–6, 7–5, 6–1
2003	(Poland) Marta Domachowska	(Belarus) Anastasiya Yakimova	7–5, 3–6, 6–4
2002	(Ukraine) Mariya Koryttseva	(Czech Republic) Jana Macurová	6–3, 6–0
2001	(Slovakia) Dominika Luzarová	(Czech Republic) Petra Kučová	2–6, 6–2, 6–0
2000	(Czech Republic) Zuzana Ondrášková	(Czech Republic) Gabriela Navrátilová	6–0, 6–4
1999	(Czech Republic) Petra Kučová	(New Zealand) Shelley Stephens	6–2, 6–4
1998	(Czech Republic) Jana Macurová	(Germany) Cornelia Grünes	3–6, 6–4, 6–1
1997	(Sweden) Annica Lindstedt	(Poland) Sylwia Rynarzewska	6–1, 6–0
1996	(Poland) Ewa Radzikowska	(Romania) Alina Tecșor	4–6, 6–2, 6–1
1995	—N/a		

=== Doubles ===
Year	Champions	Runners-up	Score
2020	cancelled due to the COVID-19 pandemic		
2019	(Spain) Rebeka Masarova (Slovakia) Rebecca Šramková	(United States) Robin Anderson (Ukraine) Anhelina Kalinina	6–4, 3–6, [10–4]
2018	(Poland) Maja Chwalińska (Poland) Katarzyna Kawa	(Uzbekistan) Albina Khabibulina (Belgium) Hélène Scholsen	6–1, 6–4
2017	(Belarus) Vera Lapko (Russia) Anna Morgina	(Czech Republic) Miriam Kolodziejová (Czech Republic) Jesika Malečková	6–2, 6–3
2016	(Romania) Irina Bara (Russia) Valeria Savinykh	(Uzbekistan) Akgul Amanmuradova (Russia) Valentyna Ivakhnenko	6–3, 4–6, [10–7]
2015	(Georgia (country)) Ekaterine Gorgodze (Georgia (country)) Sofia Shapatava	(Poland) Magdalena Fręch (Philippines) Katharina Lehnert	6–4, 6–4
2014	(Czech Republic) Martina Borecká (Czech Republic) Martina Kubičíková	(Sweden) Hilda Melander (Slovakia) Chantal Škamlová	7–6^{(7–4)}, 6–2
2013	(Poland) Paula Kania (Poland) Magda Linette	(Ukraine) Yuliya Beygelzimer (Romania) Elena Bogdan	6–2, 4–6, [10–5]
2012	(Czech Republic) Kateřina Kramperová (Czech Republic) Martina Kubičíková	(Poland) Katarzyna Piter (Poland) Barbara Sobaszkiewicz	1–6, 6–3, [10–4]
2011	(France) Stéphanie Foretz (Germany) Tatjana Malek	(Romania) Edina Gallovits-Hall (Slovenia) Andreja Klepač	6–2, 7–5
2010	(Serbia) Teodora Mirčić (Australia) Marija Mirkovic	(Poland) Katarzyna Piter (Poland) Barbara Sobaszkiewicz	4–6, 6–2, [10–5]
2009	(Ukraine) Yuliya Beygelzimer (Belarus) Ksenia Milevskaya	(Poland) Karolina Kosińska (Poland) Aleksandra Rosolska	6–1, 6–4
2008	(Poland) Olga Brózda (Poland) Magdalena Kiszczyńska	(Romania) Mihaela Buzărnescu (Russia) Anastasia Pivovarova	4–6, 6–4, [10–2]
2007	(Bosnia and Herzegovina) Sandra Martinović (Switzerland) Stefanie Vögele	(Poland) Magdalena Kiszczyńska (Poland) Natalia Kołat	2–6, 6–4, 6–3
2006	(Belarus) Ekaterina Dzehalevich (Slovenia) Andreja Klepač	(Romania) Edina Gallovits (Slovakia) Lenka Tvarošková	7–6^{(7–5)}, 6–4
2005	(Belarus) Nadejda Ostrovskaya (Israel) Yevgenia Savransky	(Czech Republic) Zuzana Hejdová (Poland) Joanna Sakowicz	6–1, 7–5
2004	(Hungary) Kira Nagy (Czech Republic) Gabriela Navrátilová	(Germany) Angelique Kerber (Poland) Marta Leśniak	6–4, 7–6^{(7–2)}
2003	(Ukraine) Olena Antypina (Czech Republic) Zuzana Hejdová	(Australia) Mireille Dittmann (Sweden) Helena Ejeson	6–3, 6–3
2002	(Slovakia) Lenka Tvarošková (Poland) Anna Żarska	(Czech Republic) Zuzana Černá (Czech Republic) Iveta Gerlová	7–5, 4–6, 6–4
2001	(Czech Republic) Petra Kučová (Czech Republic) Blanka Kumbárová	(Czech Republic) Gabriela Navrátilová (Czech Republic) Lenka Novotná	7–6^{(7–5)}, 6–3
2000	(Czech Republic) Iveta Benešová (Czech Republic) Lenka Novotná	(Czech Republic) Jana Macurová (Czech Republic) Gabriela Navrátilová	6–1, 6–4
1999	(Czech Republic) Petra Kučová (Czech Republic) Gabriela Navrátilová	(Poland) Patrycja Bandurowska (Argentina) Vanessa Krauth	6–4, 6–3
1998	(Czech Republic) Olga Blahotová (Czech Republic) Jana Macurová	(Czech Republic) Gabriela Navrátilová (Czech Republic) Petra Plačková	7–6, 6–0
1997	(Czech Republic) Renata Kučerová (Slovakia) Martina Suchá	(Czech Republic) Petra Kučová (Slovakia) Lenka Zacharová	6–3, 6–3
1996	(Australia) Jenny-Ann Fetch (Australia) Nicole Oomens	(Belarus) Antonina Grib (Belarus) Anna Kazakevitch	6–1, 6–4
1995	—N/a		
