= Mandeville-Anthony v. Walt Disney Co. =

United States court case

- Court: United States Court of Appeals for the Ninth Circuit
- Full case name: Mandeville-Anthony v. The Walt Disney Company
- Decided: July 17, 2012
- Citation: 11-56441; D.C. No. 2:11-cv-02137-VBF-JEM

Court membership
- Judges sitting: Mary M. Schroeder, Sidney Runyan Thomas, Barry G. Silverman

Case opinions
- The appellate court affirmed the district court's opinion that The Walt Disney Company's films Cars, Cars 2, and Cars Toons do not infringe on copyrighted works of Jake Mandeville-Anthony because they are not substantially similar as a matter of law.

Mandeville-Anthony v. The Walt Disney Company, 11-56441 (9th Cir. 2012), is a United States Court of Appeals for the Ninth Circuit case in which the Court evaluated whether defendants Pixar, The Walt Disney Company, Disney Enterprises, Inc. and Walt Disney Pictures infringed on Jake Mandeville-Anthony's copyrighted works. Plaintiff Mandeville-Anthony's claim for copyright infringement was first dismissed by the United States District Court for the Central District of California, because the court found that the parties' works were not substantially similar. Mandeville-Anthony made copyright infringement claims with regards to his works Cookie & Co. and Cars/Auto-Excess/Cars Chaos, an animated television show and movie, that he believed Disney copied in order to make their own films, Cars and Cars 2, both of which were very successful, and the animated television show Cars Toons: Mater's Tall Tales. He also made breach of contract claims stating that he and Disney signed a contract barring Disney from using the ideas contained in his works. The decision was affirmed by the Court of Appeals.

== History ==
In June 2006, Disney released Cars, based on a story about an anthropomorphic racing car whose journey transforms him from an arrogant hotshot into someone who has learned the true meaning of love, friendship, family and life. Five years after the release of the film, Jake Mandeville-Anthony filed a complaint against Walt Disney claiming that their works Cars, Cars 2, and Cars Toons: Mater's Tall Tales infringed on his copyrighted works Cookie and Cars Chaos. Cookie was a story of two eccentric businessmen who won a vintage car endurance rally from London to Sydney. Cars Chaos was a television series which contained general ideas in its script about a fast, good looking car that would race in different parts of the world. Mandeville-Anthony also claimed that, before the making of Cars, he signed a contract with Disney which barred Disney for two years from using his ideas from Cookie and Cars Chaos in their own works.

On June 6, 2011, United States District Court for the Central District of California denied The Walt Disney Company's request that its film Cars 2 not be reviewed for discovery for the purposes of commercial secrecy and threat of piracy, and ordered the defendants to immediately produce the screenplay/script and an audio-visual copy of Cars 2. It also ruled that the plaintiff showed a justified need for the film and actual harm if he did not receive a copy of it, because he would not be able to bring a preliminary injunction motion without it. Moreover, due to the dissimilarity between the plots, producing a copy of their film and screenplay/script would not result in any harm to the defendants. Disney therefore provided copies of Cookie & Co., Cars/Auto-Excess/Cars Chaos, a DVD copy of the motion picture Cars, and a DVD copy of animated shorts for CARS Toon: Mater's Tall Tales for the District Court's review.

== Trial Court proceedings ==
=== Defendant's claims ===
The Walt Disney Company claimed that its works were independently created and not substantially similar to Jake Mandeville-Anthony's. The basis of its claim was that basic plot ideas of anthropomorphic cars involving humor and romance with a backdrop of a race were not protected. It also claimed that the statute of limitations based on its two-year limit was expired.

=== Plaintiff's claims ===
Jake Mandeville-Anthony sued The Walt Disney Company for copyright infringement and breach of contract, claiming there was an implied promise by Disney to compensate him for his novel ideas for stories concerning anthropomorphic car characters, and that the agreement was made around June 2006, during the time of which Cars was released. In his claim, Mandeville-Anthony stated that Disney had access to his copyrighted works and used them to create their own derivative works.

== District Court opinion ==
Plaintiff's Manny Morris car character

The United States District Court, C.D. Cal. held that The Walt Disney Company showed that the protectable elements of the film such as plot, sequence of events, pace characters, theme, mood and setting were not substantially similar to Mandeville-Anthony's works as a matter of law. Rather, the Court held that the plots of the parties' works were wildly different.

With respect to the parties' main characters, the plaintiff's two-dimensional cars contained human-like appendages, eyes as headlights, eyelashes, and were black and white, while the defendant's cars were complex, three-dimensional and full color, computer-animated characters. The examples used were the plaintiff's Manny Morris character and the defendant's Mater character. The only similarity the court found between Cars and Cookie was the unprotectable concept of car racing, and between Cars and Cars Chaos was the generic idea of anthropomorphic cars, animated car characters with human characteristics. The court also held that Disney showed sufficient evidence that the statute of limitations had expired, as Mandeville-Anthony filed his complaint five years after Cars was released.

=== Circuit Court opinion ===
The United States Court of Appeals for the Ninth Circuit affirmed the district court's decision that there was no substantial similarity between the plaintiff's protected elements of copyrighted works and the defendant's works as a matter of law. It also cited Benay v. Warner Bros. Entm’t, Inc., 607 F.3d 620, 624 (9th Cir. 2010) and stated that general concepts such as car racing and anthropomorphic cars are unprotected by copyright. Lastly, it stated that district court properly granted judgment on Jake Mandeville-Anthony's state law claim for breach of implied contract because it was barred by the applicable two-year statute of limitations, and neither delayed discovery nor a continuing violations theory applied to extend the limitations period. The Ninth Circuit believed overall that Mandeville-Anthony's arguments were unpersuasive.

== See also ==
- Copyright
- Federal Rules of Civil Procedure
- Cal. Code Civ. Pro. 339(1)
