= Disney–Charter Communications dispute =

2023 carriage dispute

A carriage dispute took place between The Walt Disney Company and Charter Communications, the second-largest cable television provider in the United States, from August 31 to September 11, 2023. The Walt Disney Company removed its programming from Spectrum, Charter Communications's cable television label, during the duration of the dispute; select Disney programming remained unavailable after the companies reached an agreement.

The Walt Disney Company's leverage against distributors through the popularity of ESPN has allowed the company to raise its fees, resulting in higher prices for subscribers. Disney's fee increases have been the subject of carriage disputes, including a prior dispute between Disney and Charter Communications in July 2019. YouTube TV and Dish Network previously temporarily removed access to Disney channels on their services. Charter Communications was expected to pay Disney US$2.2 billion in 2023 despite cordcutting and intentions by The Walt Disney Company chief executive Bob Iger to create a direct-to-consumer service for ESPN. On August 31, during a US Open match, Disney channels and select ABC stations became unavailable for Spectrum subscribers. A majority of channels were restored after a resolution was reached on September 11, but eight Disney channels, including FXX, Freeform, Disney Junior, and Disney XD were not restored.

Several media organizations and investors expressed concerns over the vitality of cable television as a result of the blackout. A Bloomberg estimate valuated the dispute at a loss of US$4 billion for The Walt Disney Company, while Paramount Global chief executive Bob Bakish estimated the dispute cost programmers and operators US$15 billion in market value. Airings of The View and episodes of the final season of Archer that had not aired prior to the dispute were unavailable. Disney and Charter Communications garnered criticism for their response to the dispute, including Disney's promotion of Hulu, Disney+, and ESPN+ to Spectrum customers and Charter Communication's refusal to offer rebates; in response to Charter, Federal Communications Commission chairwoman Jessica Rosenworcel proposed requiring cable companies to provide rebates for blackouts.

== Background ==
The Walt Disney Company has leveraged the popularity of its ESPN sports channels to raise fees for distributors, resulting in higher prices for subscribers regardless of whether or not they watch Disney channels. As subscriptions grew less affordable, about a quarter of cable and satellite TV subscribers had canceled their cable subscriptions over the previous five years. The decline of cable television has resulted in a focus on exclusive content for streaming services. In July 2019, Spectrum subscribers were at risk of losing Disney-owned channels when no agreement was made between the two companies, but a temporary agreement and eventual multiyear deal kept the channels on Spectrum. In 2021, YouTube TV removed Disney channels from its service for two days; a similar incident occurred in 2022 with Dish Network. According to ESPN, the network's programming aired in more than half of homes with Spectrum in 2022.

In 2023, Charter Communications was expected to pay Disney US$2.2 billion, an increase over previous years and amid an increase in cordcutting. The company expressed interest in creating less expensive packages without ESPN; Bob Iger, the chief executive of The Walt Disney Company, stated his intent to take ESPN directly to consumers in a July 2023 interview with CNBC. Disney refuted Charter's claims and stated they proposed a favorable agreement for both companies. Charter executives agreed to Disney's terms but stipulated that the deal should allow Charter to provide customers ad-supported versions of Disney+ and ESPN+. Charter Communications chief executive Christopher Winfrey claimed that Spectrum customers have subsidized Disney's efforts to move its content to streaming. The deal is also being revised to prepare for a potential launch of ESPN's full-service over-the-top subscription.

== Dispute ==
The Walt Disney Company, the owner of this channel, has removed their programming from Spectrum which creates hardships for our customers. We apologize for the inconvenience and are continuing to negotiate in order to reach a fair agreement.

— Charter Communications notice shown on Disney-owned channels on August 31, 2023

On August 31, 2023, at approximately 5 p.m. PDT, The Walt Disney Company's channels went dark. The blackout occurred during a US Open match between Carlos Alcaraz and Lloyd Harris that was being broadcast on ESPN2 and minutes before the kickoff of a game between the Utah Utes and the Florida Gators on ESPN. A message appeared minutes later informing viewers that The Walt Disney Company's channels were removed and accusing the company of "demanding an excessive increase". ABC stations displayed the same message ten minutes later. Charter expected the blackout to potentially be indefinite and the company proposed exiting the cable television business altogether.

The dispute prevented viewers from watching the season premiere of The View in markets where ABC stations are unavailable, including New York City and Los Angeles. The blackout could have prevented Spectrum customers from viewing ESPN's coverage of the 2023 NFL season, including Monday Night Football; the NFL season premiere of Monday Night Football featured the Aaron Rodgers's anticipated debut playing for the New York Jets.

=== Affected channels ===
The dispute affected The Walt Disney Company channels.

- ACC Network
- BabyTV
- Disney Channel
- Disney Junior
- Disney XD
- ESPN
- ESPN2
- ESPN Deportes
- ESPNU
- ESPNews
- FX
- FX Movie Channel
- FXX
- Freeform
- Longhorn Network
- National Geographic
- Nat Geo Wild
- Nat Geo Mundo
- SEC Network

Additionally, three local ABC stations were also affected.

- KABC-TV, Los Angeles
- WABC-TV, New York City
- WTVD, Durham–Raleigh, North Carolina

== Resolution ==
On September 11, the dispute ended, returning The Walt Disney Company channels to Spectrum. As part of the deal, Disney+ and ESPN's future direct-to-consumer service will be provided to Spectrum TV Select subscribers, and ESPN+ will be available to Spectrum TV Select Plus subscribers. However, Baby TV, Disney Junior, Disney XD, Freeform, FXM, FXX, Nat Geo Wild, and Nat Geo Mundo were not restored.

Following the dispute's resolution, Disney executives sent a memo to employees indicating that their commitment to all their brands was unchanged and that they would continue to deliver "high-quality" programming on these channels. In a separate interview, Disney Entertainment executive Dana Walden noted that most of the original programs on the affected channels are rebroadcast onto channels such as the Disney Channel and Nat Geo, as well as Disney+ and Hulu. FX executives were reported to be looking into alternate means of allowing Spectrum customers to watch the ongoing final season of Archer through cable television. No similar reprieve was expected for Freeform programming on the basis that the majority of viewership for its programs occurs through streaming on Hulu.

== Impact ==
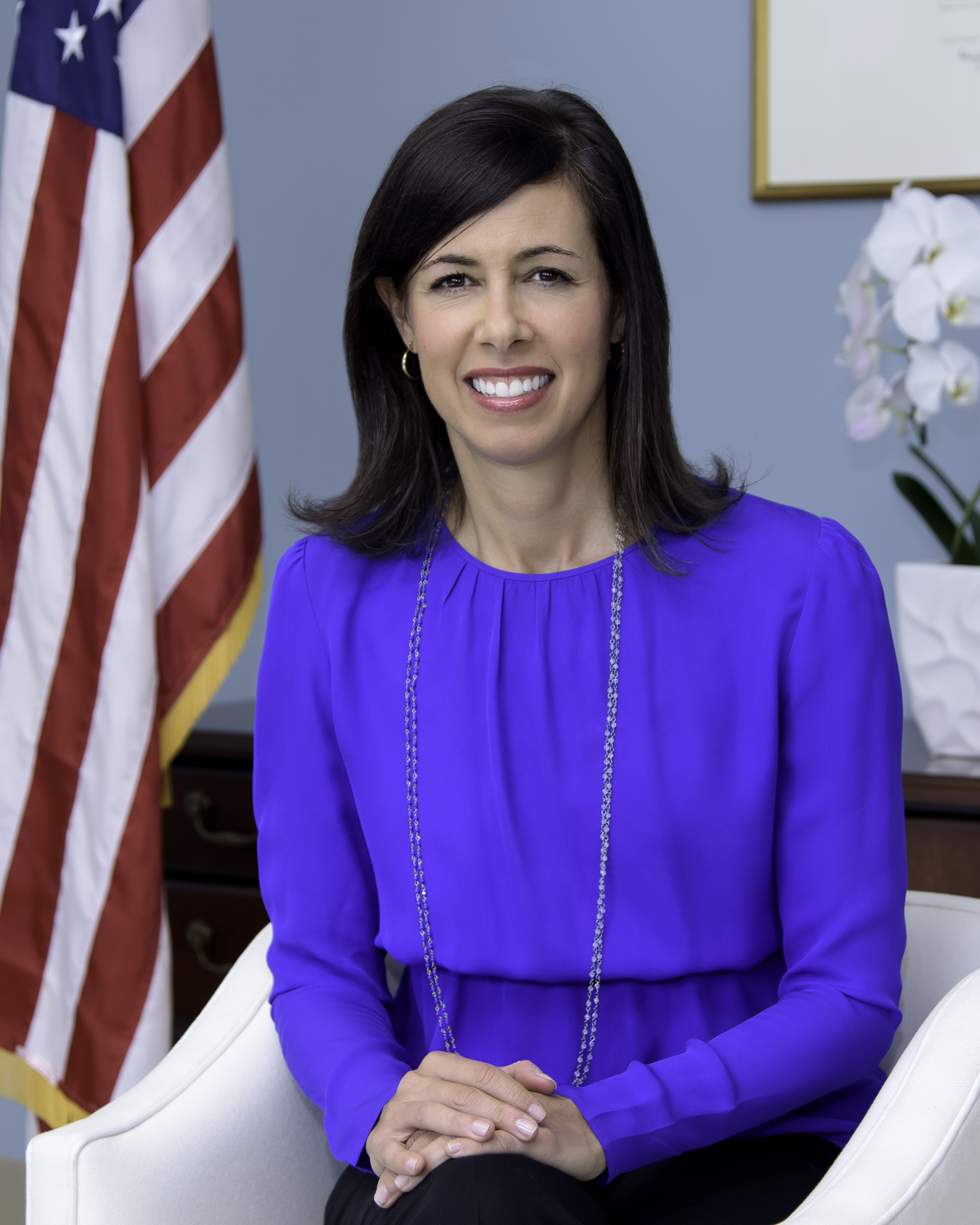
Federal Communications Commission chairwoman Jessica Rosenworcel proposed regulation in response to the dispute.

According to Bloomberg analysts, the dispute could have potentially cost The Walt Disney Company US$4 billion in revenue, including lost advertising and distribution fees. Following the blackout, shares of entertainment companies fell; Charter Communications and The Walt Disney Company fell more than 2%, while Warner Bros. Discovery fell 10%, Paramount Global fell 7%, and Comcast fell 2%. Paramount Global chief executive Bob Bakish estimated that the blackout cost programmers and operators US$15 billion in market value and called the first day of trading following the blackout a "notable day for the industry". According to Disney, the blackout drove Hulu subscriptions with live TV up 60% relative to internal expectations. On September 6, a Florida Spectrum customer filed a lawsuit in Florida federal court alleging that Charter Communications is continuing to bill for Disney channels. The dispute is unlikely to affect advertisers protected by audience guarantees.

In October, Federal Communications Commission chairwoman Jessica Rosenworcel proposed regulations requiring cable companies to provide rebates for blackouts. That month, Charter Communications reported a loss of 320,000 subscribers in the previous quarter attributed to the dispute.

== Reactions ==
Disney blamed Charter for the blackout, and considered it a "disservice to consumers" ahead of college football season. It encouraged affected customers to switch to Hulu. Charter offered customers a discounted rate for three months of FuboTV. Disney temporarily decreased the price of the ad-supported version of Disney+ from US$7.99 to US$1.99 amid the dispute and the price of Hulu with Live TV. Disney promoted Hulu, Disney+, and ESPN+ during the dispute, leading to vitriol from some Spectrum subscribers online.

Several analysts, news organizations, and companies have expressed foreboding sentiments for the future of cable television as a result of the dispute. Lightshed Partners analysts have called the dispute a watershed moment. Warner Bros. Discovery chief executive David Zaslav described the dispute as a "moment". During a Goldman Sachs conference, chief executive Brian L. Roberts said he wasn't "completely surprised" by the dispute. Axios reserved that television bundling may be at risk, but expressed the notion that the cable television industry may be "on the verge of collapsing". The Wall Street Journal was less hopeful, describing the dispute as cable television's "last stand". In a note to clients, Deutsche Bank predicted that Disney would concede its demands and distribute Disney's streaming offerings through Xumo, a streaming platform owned by Charter and Comcast.

ESPN personality Stephen A. Smith affirmed his support for Disney in a tweet on September 5. The United States Tennis Association expressed disappointment in the halted ESPN broadcast. Russian tennis player Daniil Medvedev stated that he had turned to pirate websites to stream ESPN's coverage of the U.S. Open. Christopher Winfrey stated his intention to resolve the dispute quickly in a conference call on September 7. North Carolina governor Roy Cooper called on both companies to end the dispute. New York governor Kathy Hochul and the New York Department of Public Service urged Charter Communications to offer refunds for affected customers. According to Deadline Hollywood, US Open players had access to ESPN during the dispute.

On June 26, 2025, as part of a renewed carriage agreement, Charter announced the Disney networks it had dropped would be reinstated later that summer. It also reaffirmed that the ESPN DTC service would also be available to Spectrum TV Select customers.
