= Max Dahlin =

Swedish tennis player (born 2005)

- Country (sports): Sweden
- Born: 27 December 2005 (age 20) Karlstad, Sweden
- Height: 1.88 m (6 ft 2 in)
- Plays: Right-handed (two-handed backhand)
- Coach: Frank Wintermantel
- Prize money: US $27,247

Singles
- Career record: 0–2 (at ATP Tour level, Grand Slam level, and in Davis Cup)
- Career titles: 0
- Highest ranking: No. 772 (2 November 2026)
- Current ranking: No. 778 (9 November 2026)

Doubles
- Career record: 0–0 (at ATP Tour level, Grand Slam level, and in Davis Cup)
- Career titles: 0
- Highest ranking: No. 1,058 (16 September 2024)
- Last updated on: 15 November 2026.

Max Dahlin (born 27 December 2005) is a Swedish professional tennis player. He has a career-high ATP singles ranking of No. 772 achieved on 2 November 2026 and a doubles ranking of No. 1,058 achieved on 16 September 2024. Dahlin won the 2023 US Open – Boys' doubles title with Oliver Ojakäär.

== ITF World Tennis Tour finals ==
=== Singles: 1 (runner-up) ===
Legend ITF WTT (0–1)

Result	W–L	Date	Tournament	Tier	Surface	Opponent	Score
Loss	0–1	May 2023	M15 Kalmar, Sweden	WTT	Clay	(Monaco) Lucas Catarina	1–6, 6–3, 6–7^{(12–14)}

=== Doubles: 2 (2 titles) ===
Legend ITF WTT (2–0)

Result	W–L	Date	Tournament	Tier	Surface	Partner	Opponents	Score
Win	1–0	Oct 2023	M15 Villers-lès-Nancy, France	WTT	Hard (i)	(Italy) Filippo Romano	(Germany) Patrick Zahraj (Germany) Jannik Opitz	6–2, 6–2
Win	2–0	Sep 2025	M15 Ann Arbor, US	WTT	Hard	(United States) Bjorn Swenson	(United States) Arnav Bhandari (Turkey) Mert Oral	6–3, 6–4

== Junior Grand Slam finals ==
=== Doubles: 1 (title) ===
Result	Year	Tournament	Surface	Partner	Opponents	Score
Win	2023	US Open	Hard	(Estonia) Oliver Ojakäär	(Italy) Federico Bondioli (Austria) Joel Schwärzler	3–6, 6–3, [11–9]
