= Marta Kostyuk =

Ukrainian tennis player (born 2002)

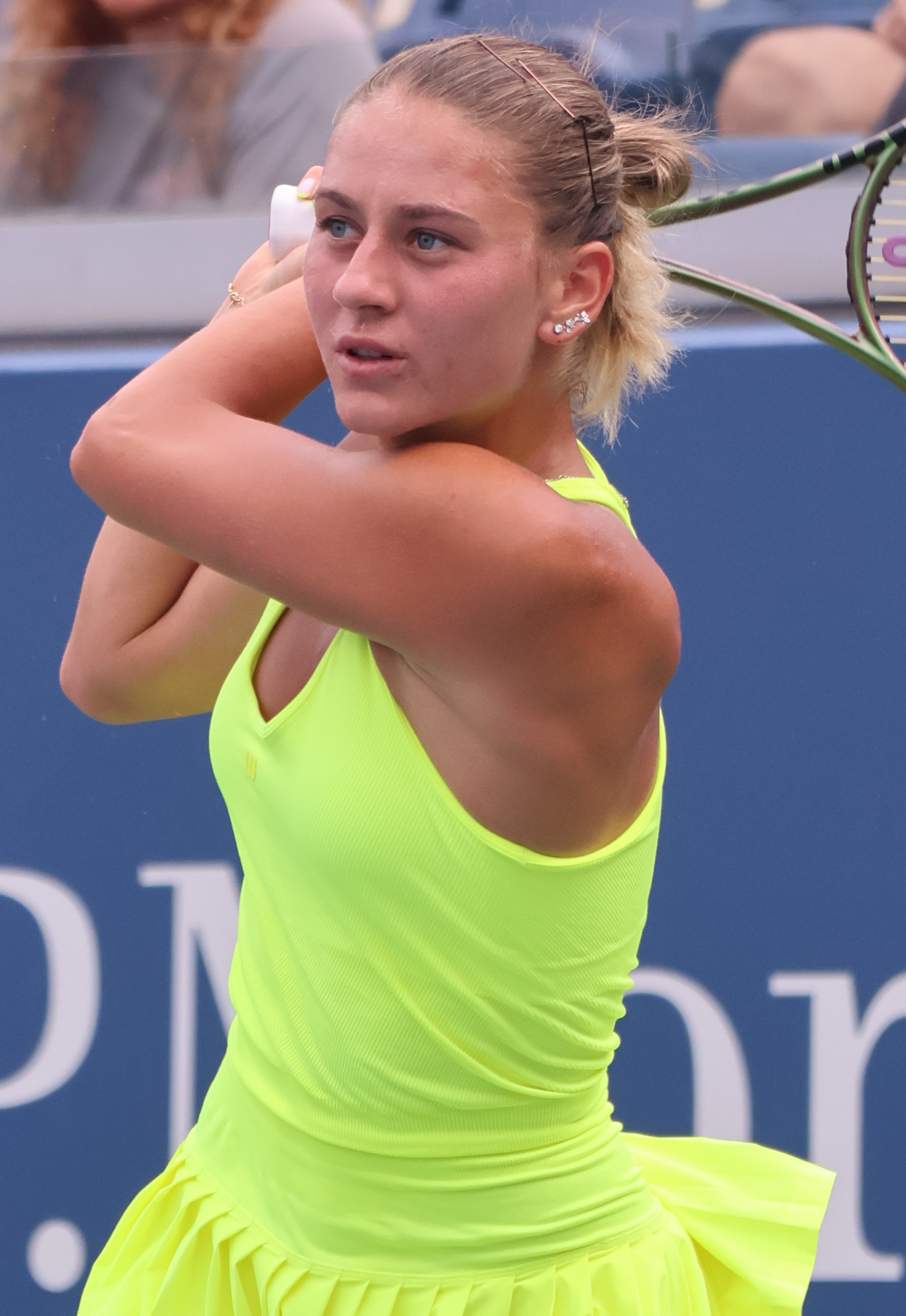
- Kostyuk at the 2023 US Open
- Full name: Marta Olehivna Kostyuk
- Native name: Марта Олегівна Костюк
- Country (sports): Ukraine
- Residence: Monte Carlo, Monaco
- Born: 28 June 2002 (age 24) Kyiv, Ukraine
- Height: 1.75 m (5 ft 9 in)
- Turned pro: 2016
- Plays: Right (two-handed backhand)
- Coach: Talina Beiko, Sandra Zaniewska (2023—)
- Prize money: US$ 11,438,119

Singles
- Career record: 276–163
- Career titles: 3
- Highest ranking: No. 10 (14 September 2026)
- Current ranking: No. 10 (16 November 2026)

Grand Slam singles results
- Australian Open: QF (2024)
- French Open: SF (2026)
- Wimbledon: SF (2026)
- US Open: 4R (2025, 2026)

Other tournaments
- Tour Finals: RR (2026)
- Olympic Games: QF (2024)

Doubles
- Career record: 86–57
- Career titles: 2
- Highest ranking: No. 27 (8 May 2023)
- Current ranking: No. 136 (16 November 2026)

Grand Slam doubles results
- Australian Open: SF (2023)
- French Open: SF (2024)
- Wimbledon: 3R (2024, 2026)
- US Open: 3R (2021, 2022, 2023, 2025)

Other doubles tournaments
- Olympic Games: 2R (2024)

Grand Slam mixed doubles results
- French Open: QF (2023)
- Wimbledon: QF (2023)

Team competitions
- Fed Cup: SF (2025)
- Last updated on: 19 November 2026.

Marta Olehivna Kostyuk (Ukrainian: Марта Олегівна Костюк [ˈmɑrtɐ koˈsʲtʲuk]; born 28 June 2002) is a Ukrainian professional tennis player. She has career-high rankings by the WTA of No. 10 in singles, achieved on 14 September 2026, and No. 27 in doubles, reached in May 2023. Kostyuk has won three WTA Tour singles titles, including a WTA 1000 event at the 2026 Madrid Open, and two titles in doubles. Her best performance at the majors is reaching the semifinals of the 2026 French Open and the 2026 Wimbledon Championships.

== Early and personal life ==
Kostyuk is the daughter of Oleh Kostyuk and Talina Beiko. Her father was the technical director of the Antey Cup, a junior tennis tournament in Kyiv; her mother was a professional tennis player who reached a career-high WTA ranking of No. 391, won a $10k title in her home city of Kyiv in 1994, and represented a Ukrainian tennis team; her grandfather Ivan Bejko mathematician and bearer of the Order of Prince Yaroslav. Kostyuk is the younger sister of Mariya Kostyuk, who competed for Chicago State University and Southeast Missouri State University, and a cousin of professional football players Vadym and Miro Slavov and gymnast Oksana Slavova.

Kostyuk started playing tennis at a young age at the Antey Tennis Club, on the west side of Kyiv, coached by her mother. She described her initial experience in tennis at age five: "My mom was always working a lot as a coach, and the first time I went to the courts to train, I just understood that if I started doing tennis, I'd get to spend more time with my mom. So that was kind of my motivation – if I played tennis, I'd be around her more often". She was also coached by her maternal uncle Taras Beiko, who had played for the USSR and Ukraine in the late 1980s and early 1990s.

In March 2023, Kostyuk announced her engagement, and in November 2023, she married her fiancé Hryhoriy.

== Career ==
=== 2015–2017: Juniors success ===
In December 2015, Kostyuk won the "14-and-under" competition at the Junior Orange Bowl in Florida. The following month, she won the 2016 Petits As in Tarbes, France, in both singles and doubles (with Kamilla Bartone).

In January 2017, Kostyuk won the girls' singles title at the Australian Open, defeating Rebeka Masarova in the final. In May, she won an ITF tournament in Dunakeszi (Hungary) without dropping a set, becoming the youngest Ukrainian to win a professional singles title. In September, Kostyuk and Olga Danilović won the girls' doubles title at the US Open. In October, she won the year-end junior girls tournament, the ITF Junior Masters in Chengdu, China, defeating Kaja Juvan in the final.

On 30 October 2017, Kostyuk achieved a career-high junior ranking of world No. 2.

=== 2018–2019: Australian Open third round at 15 ===
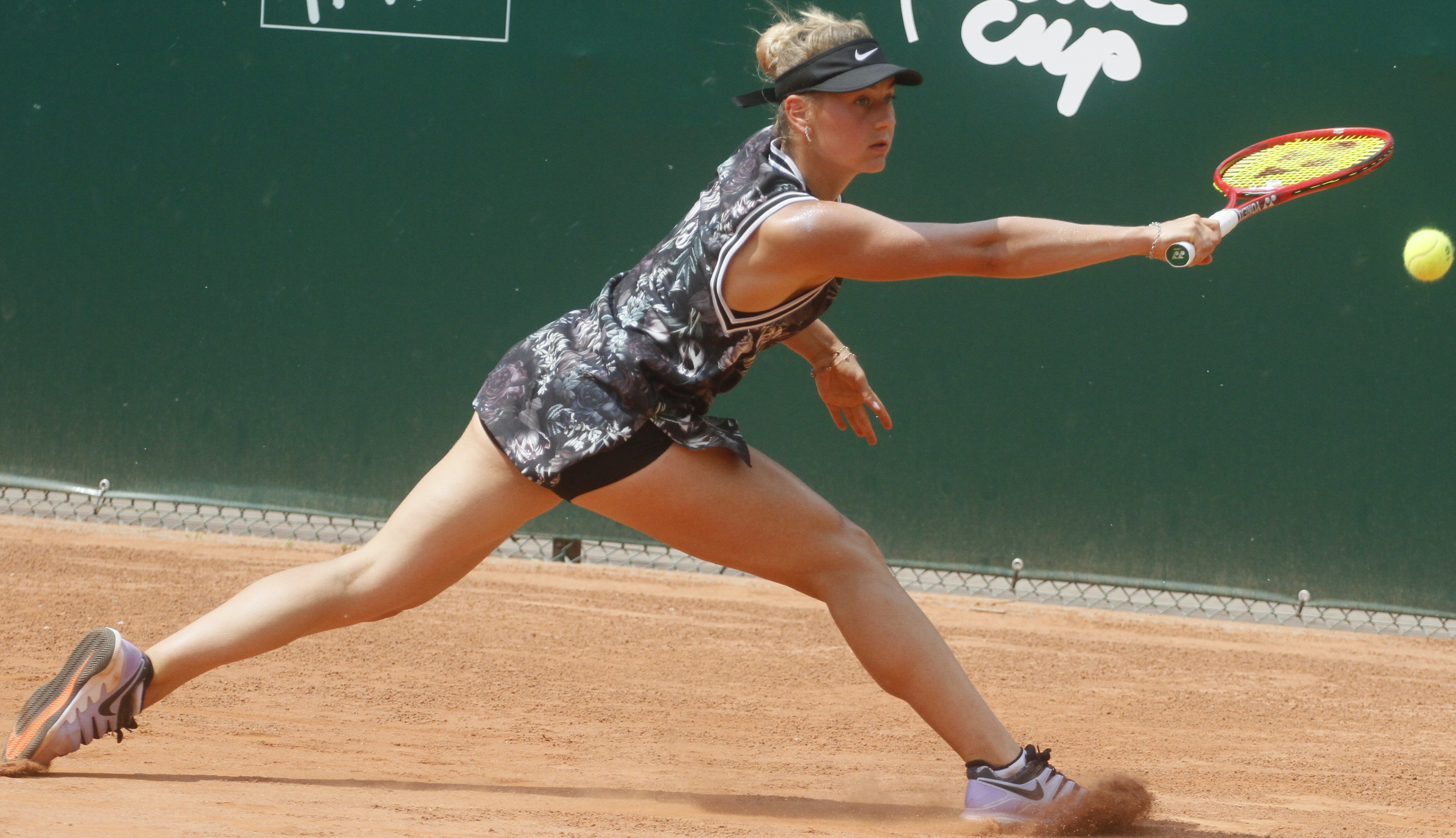
Kostyuk at the 2019 Bella Cup

Kostyuk made her main-draw major-level debut at the 2018 Australian Open, having received a wildcard into the qualifying tournament, where she defeated Arina Rodionova, Daniela Seguel and Barbora Krejčíková to become the first player born in 2002 to play in the main draw of a Grand Slam tournament and the youngest player (at 15 years and 6 months) to qualify for a major main draw since Sesil Karatantcheva at the 2005 Australian Open. By defeating Peng Shuai in the first round, Kostyuk became the youngest player to win a main-draw match in Melbourne since Martina Hingis in 1996. In the second round, she defeated Australian wildcard Olivia Rogowska in straight sets. In doing this, she became the youngest player to reach the third round of a major event since Mirjana Lučić-Baroni reached the same stage at the 1997 US Open. However, she fell in round three to fourth seed and compatriot Elina Svitolina.

Kostyuk won the Burnie International, a 60k tournament in Australia, in February 2018, and reached the final of the Zhuhai Open in March, also a 60k event.

In 2019, she reached the quarterfinals of the WTA Tour event at Strasbourg as a qualifier losing to fourth seed Caroline Garcia She finished the season ranked No. 155.

=== 2020–2021: WTA 500 semifinal, top 50 ===
Kostyuk came through the qualifying to enter the main-draw of the 2020 Prague Open, losing to Camila Giorgi in the first round.

At the 2020 US Open, she defeated Daria Kasatkina and 31st seed Anastasija Sevastova. In the third round, she met former champion and world No. 9, Naomi Osaka. Kostyuk overcame a first set deficit by winning the second in a tie-breaker, but was beaten in the third.

At the WTA 500 2021 Abu Dhabi Open, she reached the semifinals defeating Lucie Hradecká, Hsieh Su-wei, Tamara Zidanšek and Sara Sorribes Tormo, before her run was ended by Veronika Kudermetova.

At the 2021 French Open, she defeated former French Open champion and 12th seed, Garbiñe Muguruza, in the first round and went on to reach the fourth round, her best major showing to this point, where she was defeated by defending champion, Iga Świątek.

Kostyuk reached the top 50 on 1 November 2021, her highest career singles ranking, thus far.

=== 2022: Major doubles quarterfinal & first WTA Tour title ===
At the Australian Open, she reached the third round defeating Diane Parry and 32nd seed Sara Sorribes Tormo, before losing to world No. 6, Paula Badosa.

At the Eastbourne International, she defeated seventh seed Barbora Krejčíková to reach the third round, at which point she lost to wildcard entrant Harriet Dart.

Partnering with Tereza Martincová, Kostyuk won her first WTA Tour doubles title at the Portorož Open, defeating Tereza Mihalíková and Cristina Bucșa in the final.

=== 2023: Major doubles semifinal, career singles title ===
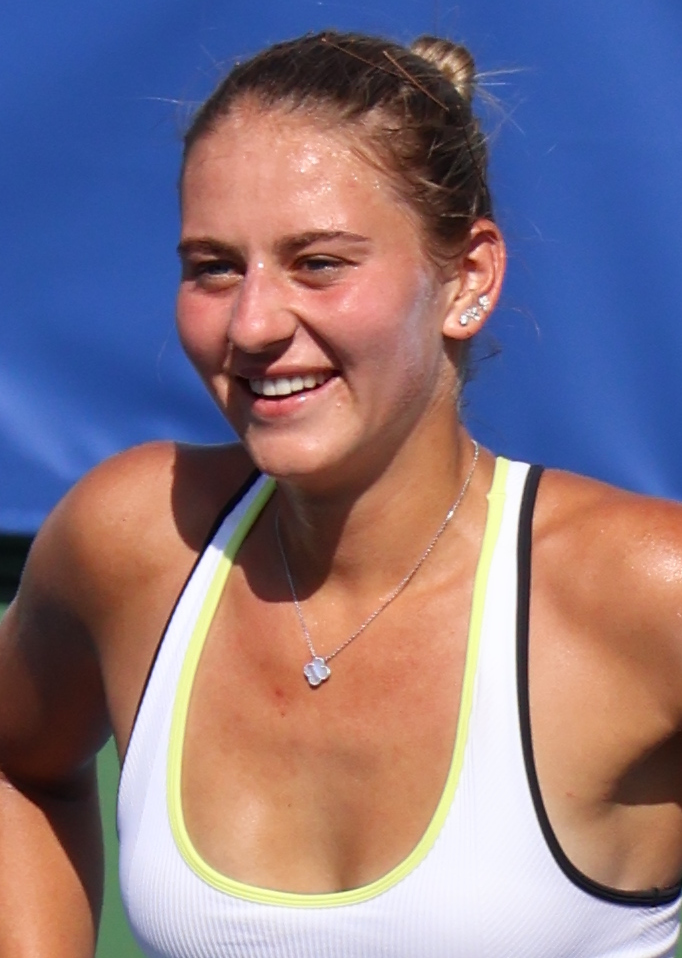
Kostyuk at the 2023 DC Open

At the WTA 500 Adelaide International, she went through qualifying and on to the quarterfinals, defeating reigning Wimbledon champion, Elena Rybakina, en route, before losing to top seed Ons Jabeur. She defeated 28th seed Amanda Anisimova and Olivia Gadecki to reach the third round at the Australian Open for the third time. Her run was ended by third seed Jessica Pegula. In doubles at the same tournament, she reached the semifinals partnering Elena-Gabriela Ruse where they lost to eventual champions Barbora Krejčíková and Kateřina Siniaková.

She reached her second quarterfinal in Hua Hin, Thailand, losing to top seed Bianca Andreescu in straight sets. At the Dubai Championships, after receiving a wildcard, she lost in the second round to eighth seed Belinda Bencic in the second longest match of the season, in three hours and 27 minutes.

Kostyuk reached her third quarterfinal of the season at the inaugural ATX Open in Austin, Texas, defeating Dalma Gálfi and Madison Brengle. Next, she defeated Anna-Lena Friedsam to reach the semifinals, and fourth seed Danielle Collins, to reach her first WTA Tour final. She won her maiden title defeating another first-time WTA Tour finalist, Varvara Gracheva. She did not shake her Russian opponent's hand, and dedicated her win "to Ukraine and to all the people who are fighting and dying right now". This win lifted her into the top 40 in the singles rankings. At the Miami Open, Kostyuk won her first round match against Elisabetta Cocciaretto but was defeated by Anastasia Potapova in the second.

Despite a first-round loss at the French Open, she reached No. 35 in the rankings on 12 June 2023. Partnering Krejčíková, Kostyuk won the doubles title at the Birmingham Classic, defeating Storm Hunter and Alycia Parks in the final. At Wimbledon, she defeated world No. 8, Maria Sakkari, for her first top 10 win, and Paula Badosa, before losing to 25th seed Madison Keys in the third round. Following the tournament, she brought on Sandra Zaniewska as a coach.

=== 2024: Major & Olympics quarterfinals, top 20 ===
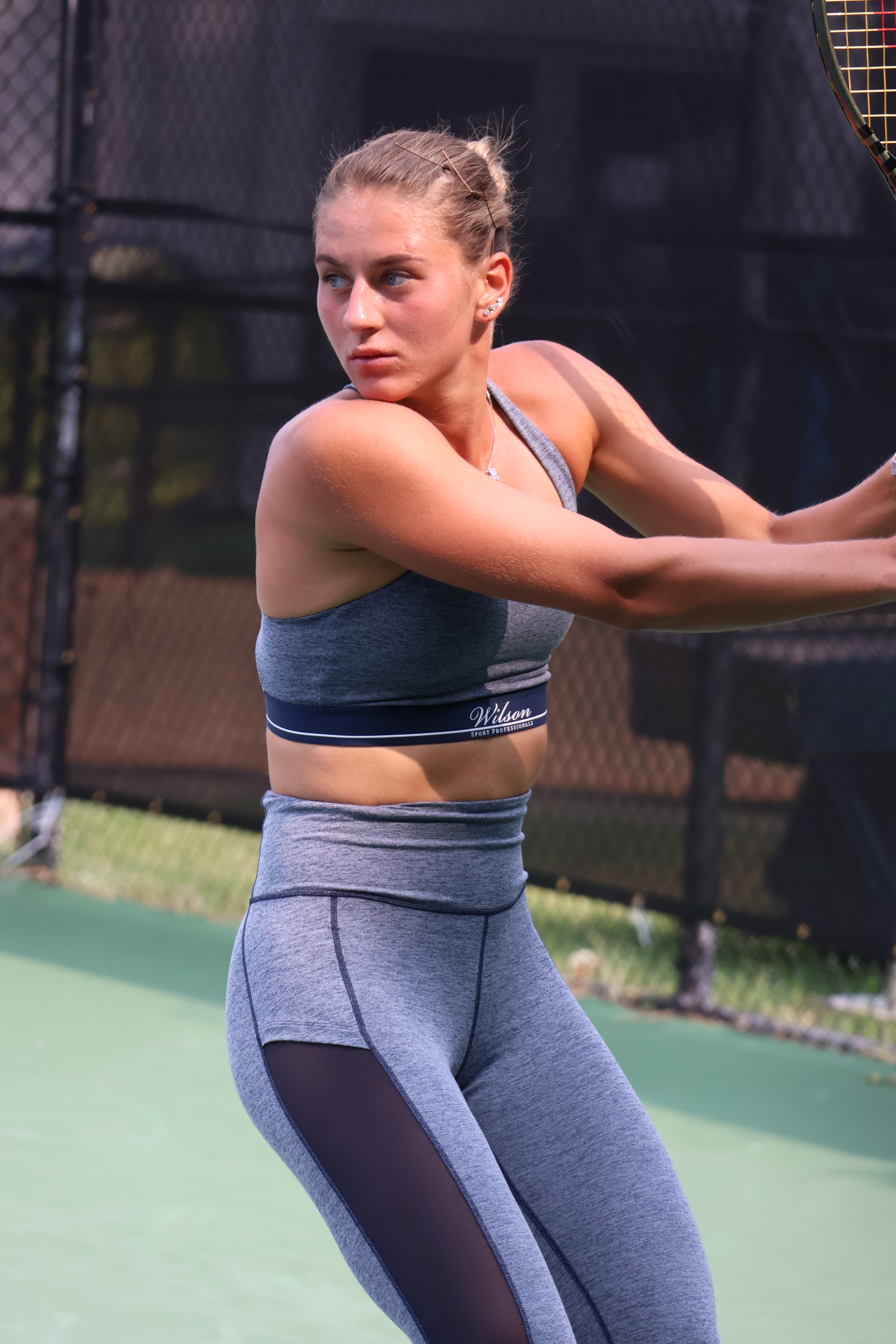
Kostyuk at the DC Open

At the Australian Open, she defeated Claire Liu, 25th seed Elise Mertens, Elina Avanesyan and another qualifier Maria Timofeeva, to reach the quarterfinals of a Grand Slam for the first time. It marked the first time multiple Ukrainian women have reached the third round, and also a record-breaking number of two of those players made it to the quarterfinals at a major event in the Open Era. As a result, she reached the top 30 in the rankings.

At the San Diego Open, she defeated top seed Jessica Pegula to reach her first WTA 500 final, with her first top-5 win, only to lose the championship match to Katie Boulter in three sets.

Seeded 31st at Indian Wells, she reached the semifinals of a WTA 1000 for the first time defeating Mai Hontama, seventh seed Markéta Vondroušová by walkover, 22nd seed Anastasia Pavlyuchenkova and 28th seed Anastasia Potapova, but lost to eventual champion Iga Świątek. Despite the loss she reached a new career-high ranking of No. 26 on 18 March 2024.

At the start of the clay-court season, at the WTA 500 Stuttgart Grand Prix, she defeated wildcard entrant Laura Siegemund, and fifth seed Zheng Qinwen, saving five match points to reach the quarterfinals. She defeated third seed Coco Gauff on her eighth match point, her first top-3 win, to reach the semifinals. She reached her second WTA 500 final with a straight-sets win over another major champion, sixth seed Markéta Vondroušová, her third top-10 win in three days. She lost the final to Elena Rybakina in straight sets. Despite the defeat, she reached a new career-high of No. 21 on 22 April 2024. Two weeks later, Kostyuk reached the top 20, following the Madrid Open. At the French Open, she reached the second round where she lost to Donna Vekić. In doubles at the same tournament, she reached the semifinals for the first time at this major, partnering again Elena-Gabriela Ruse, with wins over ninth seeds Leylah Fernandez and Erin Routliffe, and then Mirra Andreeva and Vera Zvonareva by walkover.

Kostyuk represented Ukraine at the 2024 Paris Olympics, where she reached the quarterfinals. In doubles partnering with Dayana Yastremska, they lost in the second round to Taiwanese pairing Hsieh Su-wei and Tsao Chia-yi.

=== 2025: Three WTA 1000 quarterfinals ===
In February, Kostyuk defeated Zeynep Sönmez, world No. 3, Coco Gauff and Magda Linette to reach the quarterfinals at the WTA 1000 Qatar Open, where she lost to Amanda Anisimova in three sets.

Seeded 24th at the Madrid Open, she made the quarterfinals with wins over Emma Raducanu, Veronika Kudermetova and 32nd seed Anastasia Potapova, before losing to world No. 1, Aryna Sabalenka.

At the Canadian Open, Kostyuk was given a bye in the first round due to her seeding at 24th and then defeated Markéta Vondroušová, 15th seed Daria Kasatkina and 28th seed McCartney Kessler to reach her third WTA 1000 quarterfinal of the year. In her last eight match against ninth seed Elena Rybakina, she retired due to a wrist injury in the second set, having lost the first. Seeded 27th at the US Open, she defeated Katie Boulter, Zeynep Sönmez and Diane Parry to reach the fourth round for the first time, at which point she lost to 11th seed Karolína Muchová. In doubles, at the same event, she also reached the round of 16, partnering with Elena-Gabriela Ruse, and defeated the Spanish-Italian pair of Jéssica Bouzas Maneiro and Elisabetta Cocciaretto, and then eliminated the 14th-seeded team of Beatriz Haddad Maia and Laura Siegemund.

In September at the China Open, Kostyuk received a bye as 23rd seed and then overcame qualifiers Ella Seidel, and Aliaksandra Sasnovich, before losing to fifth seed Jessica Pegula in the fourth round.

=== 2026: WTA 1000 title, two major semifinals ===
After being given a first-round bye due to being 16th seed at the Brisbane International, Kostyuk defeated lucky loser Yulia Putintseva and then recorded three successive top-10 wins over Amanda Anisimova, Mirra Andreeva and Jessica Pegula to reach her third WTA 500 final. She lost the championship match to Aryna Sabalenka.

In March, she made it into back-to-back WTA 1000 third rounds in Indian Wells and Miami, losing to Elena Rybakina on both occasions. The following month, as the top seed at the Open de Rouen, Kostyuk recorded wins over Diane Parry, Caty McNally fifth seed Ann Li and Tatjana Maria to make it into the final, where she defeated qualifier Veronika Podrez to win her second career singles title, and first on clay courts. The championship match was the first ever WTA Tour final contested by two Ukrainian players. As a result, Kostyuk returned to the top 25 in the singles rankings at No. 23, on 20 April.

Seeded 26th at the Madrid Open, Kostyuk received a bye and then defeated Yulia Putintseva, fifth seed Jessica Pegula, Caty McNally, 13th seed Linda Nosková and lucky loser Anastasia Potapova to reach her first WTA 1000 final. She overcame ninth seed Mirra Andreeva in the championship match to win her third career title and extend her winning run to eleven consecutive matches. As a result, she reached the top 15 in the singles rankings on May 4th.

After winning her first-round match at the French Open against Oksana Selekhmeteva, Kostyuk gave an emotional on-court interview during which as she spoke about the war in Ukraine and said that a missile had landed near her parents’ home just hours earlier. She went on to reach her maiden major semifinal, defeating third seed Iga Świątek in the fourth round and seventh seed Elina Svitolina in the first all-Ukrainian Grand Slam quarterfinal in the Open Era. She was the first-ever Ukrainian woman to reach the semifinals at Roland Garros. In the semifinals, Kostyuk lost to eighth seed and eventual champion, Mirra Andreeva, in straight sets, bringing an end to her 17-match winning streak.

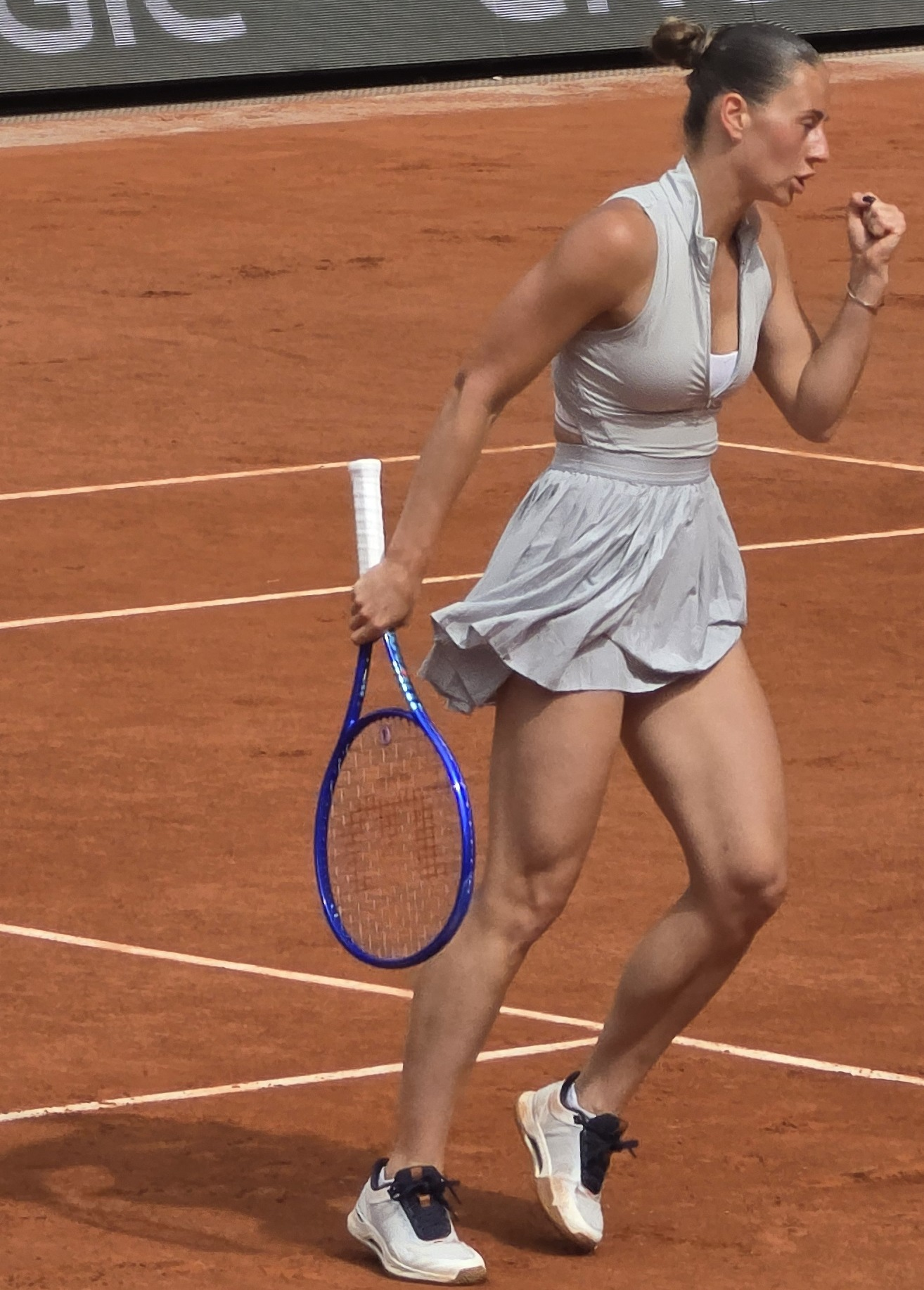
Kostyuk at the 2026 French Open

Seeded 12th at Wimbledon, she defeated Nadia Podoroska, Anna Blinkova, 23rd seed Emma Navarro, qualifier Ashlyn Krueger and 13th seed Jasmine Paolini to make it through to the semifinals having never previously gone beyond the third round at that major. Kostyuk lost in the last four to ninth seed and eventual champion, Linda Nosková. She reached a new career-high ranking of world No. 11 on 13 July 2026.

In August at the Cincinnati Open, she recorded a win over fifth seed Mirra Andreeva en route to the quarterfinals, where she lost to fourth seed and eventual champion Coco Gauff. Seeded 11th at the US Open, Kostyuk defeated qualifier Storm Hunter, wildcard entrant Sloane Stephens and 18th seed Ekaterina Alexandrova, before losing to sixth seed Linda Nosková in round four.

In November, Kostyuk entered the season ending WTA Finals as first alternate replacing world No. 1, Elena Rybakina, who withdrew the day before the event began due to illness. She was eliminated in the round-robin stage.

== Career statistics ==
=== Grand Slam tournament performance timelines ===
Key
W	F	SF	QF	#R	RR	Q#	DNQ	A	NH

(W) winner; (F) finalist; (SF) semifinalist; (QF) quarterfinalist; (#R) rounds 4, 3, 2, 1; (RR) round-robin stage; (Q#) qualification round; (DNQ) did not qualify; (A) absent; (NH) not held; (SR) strike rate (events won / competed); (W–L) win–loss record.
To avoid confusion and double counting, these charts are updated at the conclusion of a tournament or when the player's participation has ended.

==== Singles ====
Current through the 2026 US Open.

Tournament	2018	2019	2020	2021	2022	2023	2024	2025	2026	SR	W–L	Win%
Australian Open	3R	Q3	Q1	1R	3R	3R	QF	3R	1R	0 / 7	12–7	63%
French Open	Q2	A	1R	4R	1R	1R	2R	1R	SF	0 / 7	9–7	56%
Wimbledon	Q3	Q1	NH	2R	2R	3R	3R	1R	SF	0 / 6	11–6	65%
US Open	Q2	A	3R	1R	2R	1R	3R	4R	4R	0 / 7	11–7	61%
Win–loss	2–1	0–0	2–2	4–4	4–4	4–4	9–4	5–4	13–4	0 / 27	43–27	61%

==== Doubles ====
Tournament	2020	2021	2022	2023	2024	2025	2026	SR	W–L	Win%
Australian Open	A	1R	3R	SF	2R	QF	A	0 / 5	10–5	67%
French Open	QF	1R	QF	3R	SF	A	A	0 / 5	12–5	71%
Wimbledon	NH	2R (Note: Withdrawal during the tournament, not counted as a loss.)	2R	2R	3R	2R	3R	0 / 6	8–4	67%
US Open	A	3R	3R	3R	2R	3R	2R	0 / 6	10–5	67%
Win–loss	3–1	3–3	8–4	9–4	8–3	6–3	3–1	0 / 22	40–19	68%

==== Mixed doubles ====
Tournament	2021	2022	2023	W–L
Australian Open	A	A	A	0–0
French Open	A	A	QF	2–1
Wimbledon	2R	A	QF	3–1
US Open	A	A	A	0–0
Win–loss	1–0	0–0	4–2	5–2
