= List of Grand Slam wheelchair Girls' singles champions =

Junior wheelchair girls' Grand Slam champions

Junior wheelchair Grand Slam tournaments are currently contested at three of the four Grand Slam venues, with Wimbledon being the exception. They were first introduced in 2022 at the US Open where Jade Lanai won the inaugural girls' singles title and also partnered with Maylee Phelps to win the girls' inaugural doubles title.

== Wheelchair girls' singles ==
Year	Australian Open	French Open	Wimbledon	US Open
2022	not held	not held	not held	Jade Lanai
2023	not held	not held	not held	Ksénia Chasteau
2024	not held	Ksénia Chasteau	not held	Yuma Takamuro
2025	Vitória Miranda	Vitória Miranda	not held	Sabina Czauz
2026	Luna Gryp	Luna Gryp	not held	

== Wheelchair girls' doubles ==
Year	Australian Open	French Open	Wimbledon	US Open
2022	not held	not held	not held	Jade Lanai; Maylee Phelps
2023	not held	not held	not held	Ksénia Chasteau; Maylee Phelps
2024	not held	Ksénia Chasteau; Maylee Phelps	not held	Rio Okano; Yuma Takamuro
2025	Luna Gryp; Vitória Miranda	Luna Gryp; Vitória Miranda	not held	Sabina Czauz; Seira Matsuoka
2026	Lucy Foyster; Seira Matsuoka	Luna Gryp; Seira Matsuoka	not held	
