= 2026 NCAA Division I Men's Tennis Championships =

- Date: November 18–23, 2025; May 1–17, 2026
- Edition: 80th
- Location: Orlando, Florida (Fall 2025); Athens, Georgia (Spring 2026)
- Venue: USTA National Campus; Hosted by: UCF (Fall 2025); Dan Magill Tennis Complex; Hosted by: University of Georgia (Spring 2026)

Champions

Men's singles
- Michael Zheng (Columbia) (Fall 2025)

Men's doubles
- Mans Dahlberg and Dylan Dietrich (Virginia) (Fall 2025)

Men's team
- Virginia Cavaliers (Spring 2026)
- NCAA Division I Men's Tennis Championships

The 2026 NCAA Division I Men's Tennis Championships were the men's tennis tournaments, the men's singles and doubles tournament was played in the fall from November 18 to November 23, 2025, in Orlando, Florida at the USTA National Campus. The men's team tournament was played in the spring from May 1 to May 17, 2026, at campus sites and Athens, Georgia at the Dan Magill Tennis Complex hosted by University of Georgia. It was the 80th edition of the NCAA Division I Men's Tennis Championship. As part of a two-year pilot program, the men's singles and doubles championships were conducted in the fall of 2025, while the team championships were played in the spring of 2026.

== Men's team championship ==
There were 64 teams selected for the men's team championship, 27 of which were automatic qualifiers from each Division 1 conference. The remaining 37 teams were selected at-large. Teams played two rounds of single-elimination matches in groups of four on May 1–2 at campus sites; the winners of those regionals advanced to a super-regional round on May 8 or 9, also held at campus sites. The remaining eight teams advanced to the championship rounds in Athens, Georgia on May 14–17.

=== Automatic qualifiers ===
The following 27 teams were automatic qualifiers, representing their conferences:

Conference	Team
American	Tulsa
Atlantic 10	Richmond
ACC	Wake Forest
ASUN	Stetson
Big East	St. John's
Big Sky	Northern Arizona
Big South	Gardner–Webb
Big Ten	Michigan State
Big 12	TCU
Big West	UC Santa Barbara
CAA	Elon
CUSA	Middle Tennessee
Horizon	Tennessee Tech
Ivy	Cornell
MAAC	Rider
MAC	Buffalo
MEAC	South Carolina State
Mountain West	Utah State
Northeast	Wagner
Patriot	Navy
SEC	Texas
Southern	Samford
Southland	Texas A&M – Corpus Christi
SWAC	Alabama State
Summit	Denver
Sun Belt	Old Dominion
West Coast	San Diego

=== National seeds ===
Sixteen teams were selected as national seeds and were guaranteed to host for the first two rounds if they submitted a bid and met criteria.

1. Wake Forest (semifinals)
2. Texas (runner-up)
3. Ohio State (quarterfinals)
4. Virginia (National Champions)
5. Mississippi State (quarterfinals)
6. TCU (semifinals)
7. LSU (second round)
8. Arizona (quarterfinals)
9. Oklahoma (super regionals)
10. Baylor (quarterfinals)
11. Texas A&M (second round)
12. Georgia (super regionals)
13. South Carolina (super regionals)
14. Illinois (super regionals)
15. San Diego (super regionals)
16. UCF (super regionals)

=== Bracket ===
Bold indicates winner. Host institutions for the first two rounds and Super Regionals are marked with an asterisk (*).

**First Round**; May 1–2, 2026; Campus sites
1	**Wake Forest***	**4**
Navy	0
Winston-Salem, North Carolina
Gardner–Webb	0
**Old Dominion**	**4**
**Florida**	**4**
Stetson	0
Orlando, Florida
South Carolina State	0
16	**UCF***	**4**
9	**Oklahoma***	**4**
Utah State	0
Norman, Oklahoma
Duke	2
**Southern California**	**4**
Ole Miss	3
**Clemson**	**4**
Tucson, Arizona
Northern Arizona	0
8	**Arizona***	**4**
5	**Mississippi State***	**4**
Tennessee Tech	0
Starkville, Mississippi
Samford	1
**Wisconsin**	**4**
**NC State**	**4**
Middle Tennessee	2
Athens, Georgia
Elon	0
12	**Georgia***	**4**
13	**South Carolina***	**4**
Richmond	0
Columbia, South Carolina
North Carolina	1
**Michigan State**	**4**
**Columbia**	**4**
St. John's	0
Charlottesville, Virginia
Rider	0
4	**Virginia***	**4**
3	**Ohio State***	**4**
Buffalo	0
Columbus, Ohio
**California**	**4**
Kentucky	3
Notre Dame	1
**Vanderbilt**	**4**
Champaign-Urbana, Illinois
Yale	0
14	**Illinois***	**4**
11	**Texas A&M***	**4**
Wagner	0
College Station, Texas
Penn	1
**Stanford**	**4**
**Cornell**	**4**
Arkansas	3
Fort Worth, Texas
Denver	0
6	**TCU***	**4**
7	**Virginia***	**4**
Alabama State	0
Baton Rouge, Louisiana
Michigan	2
**Pepperdine**	**4**
**Auburn**	**4**
Santa Clara	3
Waco, Texas
Tulsa	0
10	**Baylor***	**4**
15	**San Diego***	**4**
UC Santa Barbara	2
San Diego, California
Arizona State	0
**UCLA**	**4**
**SMU**	**4**
Princeton	2
Austin, Texas
A&M–Corpus Christi	0
2	**Texas***	**4**

**Second Round**; May 1–2, 2026; Campus sites
1	**Wake Forest**	**4**
Old Dominion	0
Florida	3
16	**UCF**	**4**
9	**Oklahoma**	**4**
Southern California	0
Clemson	2
8	**Arizona**	**4**
5	**Mississippi State**	**4**
Wisconsin	0
NC State	0
12	**Georgia**	**4**
13	**South Carolina**	**4**
Michigan State	1
Columbia	2
4	**Virginia**	**4**
3	**Ohio State**	**4**
California	0
Vanderbilt	0
14	**Illinois**	**4**
11	Texas A&M	2
**Stanford**	**4**
Cornell	0
6	**TCU**	**4**
7	LSU	3
**Pepperdine**	**4**
Auburn	1
10	**Baylor**	**4**
15	**San Diego**	**4**
UCLA	0
SMU	0
2	**Texas**	**4**

**Super Regionals**; May 8 or 9, 2026; Campus sites
1	**Wake Forest***	**4**
16	UCF	1
9	Oklahoma	3
8	**Arizona***	**4**
5	**Mississippi State***	**4**
12	Georgia	1
13	South Carolina	1
4	**Virginia***	**4**
3	**Ohio State***	**4**
14	Illinois	0
Stanford	0
6	**TCU***	**4**
Pepperdine	3
10	**Baylor***	**4**
15	San Diego	0
2	**Texas***	**4**

**Quarterfinals**; May 14, 2026; Athens
1	**Wake Forest**	**4**
8	Arizona	1
5	Mississippi State	1
4	**Virginia**	**4**
3	Ohio State	3
6	**TCU**	**4**
10	Baylor	1
2	**Texas**	**4**

**Semifinals**; May 16, 2026; Athens
1	Wake Forest	3
4	**Virginia**	**4**
6	TCU	3
2	**Texas**	**4**

**Championship**; May 17, 2026; Athens
4	**Virginia**	**4**
2	Texas	3

Bracket source:

== Men's singles championship ==
64 singles players qualified for the men's singles championship via competition in approved ITA qualifying pathway events. The tournament was played in the Fall of 2025 from November 18 to 23 in Orlando, Florida.

Columbia senior Michael Zheng won the men's singles title against SMU junior Trevor Svajda 6–4, 1–6, 6–3.

=== National seeds ===
The following sixteen players were seeded for this tournament:

1. Jay Friend (Arizona)
2. Duncan Chan (TCU)
3. Aidan Kim (Ohio State)
4. Matthew Forbes (Michigan State)
5. Devin Badenhorst (Baylor)
6. Kenta Miyoshi (Illinois)
7. Dylan Dietrich (Virginia)
8. Ozan Baris (Michigan State)

Players ranked 9th–16th, listed by last name

- Jack Anthrop (Ohio State)
- Martin Borisiouk (NC State)
- Paul Inchauspe (Princeton)
- Jeremy Jin (Florida)
- Petar Jovanovic (Mississippi State)
- Eli Stephenson (Kentucky)
- Connor Henry Van Schalkwyk (Baylor)
- Jakub Vrba (Arkansas)

=== Draw ===
Bracket:

==== Finals ====
Quarterfinals
9–16	Petar Jovanovic (Mississippi State)	3	2
Trevor Svajda (SMU)	6	6
Max Dahlin (Michigan)	6	5	2
5	Martin Borisiouk (NC State)	4	7	6
Luca Pow (Wake Forest)	6	4	2
9–16	Paul Inchauspe (Princeton)	4	6	6
8	Ozan Baris (Michigan State)	6	3	2
Michael Zheng (Columbia)	4	6	6

Semifinals
Trevor Svajda (SMU)	6	6
Martin Borisiouk (NC State)	2	0
9–16	Paul Inchauspe (Princeton)	3	7	2
Michael Zheng (Columbia)	6	5	6

Final
Trevor Svajda (SMU)	4	6	3
Michael Zheng (Columbia)	6	1	6

==== Section 1 ====
First round
1	Jay Friend (Arizona)	6	3	6
Joaquin Guilleme (Wake Forest)	4	6	1
Oscar Lacides (Oklahoma)	4	6	4
Keegan Rice (Virginia)	6	3	6
9–16	Petar Jovanovic (Mississippi State)	7	6
Preston Stearns (Ohio State)	5	3
Ian Mayew (North Carolina)	3	6
Sebastian Gorzny (Texas)	6	7^{2}
6	Kenta Miyoshi (Illinois)	6	6
Dominique Rolland (UC Santa Barbara)	4	1
Edward Winter (Pepperdine)	6	6
Melchior Delloye (Harvard)	2	3
9–16	Jeremy Jin (Florida)	1	6	4
Trevor Svajda (SMU)	6	4	6
Vignesh Gogineni (Yale)	3	6
Amirkhamza Nasridinov (Auburn)	6	7^{11}

Second round
1	J Friend (Arizona)	6	4
K Rice (Virginia)	7^{4}	6
9–16	P Jovanovic (Mississippi State)	6	0	6
S Gorzny (Texas)	3	6	3
6	K Miyoshi (Illinois)	7^{2}	6
E Winter (Pepperdine)	6	0
T Svajda (SMU)	6	2	6
A Nasridinov (Auburn)	3	6	0

Third round
K Rice (Virginia)	5	5
9–16	P Jovanovic (Mississippi State)	7	7
6	K Miyoshi (Illinois)	2	4
T Svajda (SMU)	6	6

Quarterfinals
9–16	P Jovanovic (Mississippi State)	3	2
T Svajda (SMU)	6	6

==== Section 2 ====
First round
4	Matthew Forbes (Michigan State)	3	7^{3}	6
Pablo Martinez Gomez (Vanderbilt)	6	6	4
Cosme Rolland De Ravel (TCU)	7	5	7^{8}
Alexander Frusina (Texas A&M)	5	7	6
9–16	Jack Loutit (Kentucky)	6	7
Illia Maksymchuk (UNLV)	1	5
Sebastian Dominko (Notre Dame)	6	3
Max Dahlin (Michigan)	7^{3}	6
5	Devin Badenhorst (Baylor)	6	6
Tiago Silva (California)	2	1
Matic Kriznik (Alabama)	3	4
DK Suresh (Wake Forest)	6	6
9–16	Jack Anthrop (Ohio State)	3	0
Filip Gustafsson (Arizona)	6	6
Spencer Johnson (UCLA)	2	7^{4}	6
Martin Borisiouk (NC State)	6	6	7^{1}

Second round
4	M Forbes (Michigan State)	6	6
C Rolland De Ravel (TCU)	1	4
9–16	J Loutit (Kentucky)	4	3
M Dahlin (Michigan)	6	6
5	D Badenhorst (Baylor)	6	4
D Suresh (Wake Forest)	7^{4}	6
F Gustafsson (Arizona)	4	3
M Borisiouk (NC State)	6	6

Third round
4	M Forbes (Michigan State)	5	6	6
M Dahlin (Michigan)	7	1	7^{3}
D Suresh (Wake Forest)	4	1
M Borisiouk (NC State)	6	6

Quarterfinals
M Dahlin (Michigan)	6	5	2
M Borisiouk (NC State)	4	7	6

==== Section 3 ====
First round
Luca Pow (Wake Forest)	3	6	6
Sam Landau (Indiana)	6	1	4
Peter Benjamin Privara (Harvard)	4	6	1
9–16	Jakub Vrba (Arkansas)	6	4	6
Soham Purohit (Washington)	3	6
Bryan Hernandez Cortes (Mississippi State)	6	7^{5}
Luis Carlos Alvarez Valdes (Oklahoma)	4	3
7	Dylan Dietrich (Virginia)	6	6
Lucca Liu (UC Santa Barbara)	3	7	7^{4}
Niels Ratiu (North Carolina)	6	5	6
Sasha Rozin (Arizona)	6	6	5
9–16	Paul Inchauspe (Princeton)	0	7^{5}	7
Rudy Quan (UCLA)	7^{5}	4	2
William Jansen (Georgia)	6	6	6
Antonio Prat (Miami (FL))	6	4
3	Aidan Kim (Ohio State)	7^{7}	6

Second round
L Pow (Wake Forest)	6	6
9–16	J Vrba (Arkansas)	3	3
B Hernandez Cortes (Mississippi State)	4	4
7	D Dietrich (Virginia)	6	6
L Liu (UC Santa Barbara	6	6	1
9–16	P Inchauspe (Princeton)	2	7^{4}	6
W Jansen (Georgia)	7	6
3	A Kim (Ohio State)	5	2

Third round
L Pow (Wake Forest)	2	6	6
7	D Dietrich (Virginia)	6	4	4
9–16	P Inchauspe (Princeton)	6	6
W Jansen (Georgia)	2	4

Quarterfinals
L Pow (Wake Forest)	6	4	2
9–16	P Inchauspe (Princeton)	4	6	6

==== Section 4 ====
First round
Ilya Snitari (UNLV)	4	6	6
Shu Matsuoka (Arizona State)	6	3	4
Luis Felipe Miguel (Florida State)	2	0
9–16	Eli Stephenson (Kentucky)	6	6
Roan Jones (North Carolina)	6	1	6
Paul Barbier Gazeu (South Carolina)	4	6	3
Jangjun Kim (Virginia)	2	6
8	Ozan Baris (Michigan State)	6	7^{4}
Hugo Car (South Florida)	4	2
Michael Zheng (Columbia)	6	6
Sebastian Eriksson (Texas)	6	6
9–16	Connor Henry Van Schalkwyk (Baylor)	3	3
Fryderyk Lechno Wasiutynski (California)	2	4
Benito Sanchez Martinez (Mississippi State)	6	6
Romain Gales (Clemson)	6	6	7^{10}
2	Duncan Chan (TCU)	2	7^{5}	6

Second round
I Snitari (UNLV)	6	6	6
9–16	E Stephenson (Kentucky)	7^{4}	2	3
R Jones (North Carolina)	2	5
8	O Baris (Michigan State)	6	7
M Zheng (Columbia)	6	6
S Eriksson (Texas)	3	3
B Sanchez Martinez (Mississippi State)	3	6
R Gales (Clemson)	6	7^{4}

Third round
I Snitari (UNLV)	4	6
8	O Baris (Michigan State)	6	7^{5}
M Zheng (Columbia)	6	6
R Gales (Clemson)	3	2

Quarterfinals
8	O Baris (Michigan State)	6	3	2
M Zheng (Columbia)	4	6	6

== Men's doubles championship ==
32 doubles teams qualified for the men's doubles championship, via competition in approved ITA qualifying pathway events. The tournament was played at the same time as the singles championship in the Fall of 2025 from November 18 to 23 in Orlando, Florida.

Mans Dahlberg and Dylan Dietrich of Virginia beat Nikita Filin and Brandon Carpico of Ohio State to win the men's double title.

=== National seeds ===
The following eight teams were seeded for this tournament:

1. Benito Sanchez Martinez / Petar Jovanovic (Mississippi State)
2. DK Suresh / Andrew Delgado (Wake Forest)
3. Isac Stromberg / Kai Milburn (Ole Miss)
4. Max Dahlin / Bjorn Swenson (Michigan)

Players ranked 5th–8th, listed by institution

- Aidan Kim / Bryce Nakashima (Ohio State)
- Paul Inchauspe / Landon Ardila (Princeton)
- Aleksa Krivokapic / Maj Premzl (Purdue)
- Cosme Rolland De Ravel / Albert Pedrico Kravtsov (TCU)

=== Draw ===
Bracket:

==== Finals ====
Semifinals
Mans Dahlberg (Virginia); Dylan Dietrich (Virginia)	6	6
Tanapatt Nirundorn (Florida); Henry Jefferson (Florida)	1	4
Nikita Filin (Ohio State); Brandon Carpico (Ohio State)	7^{2}	6
Aaron Sandler (Penn); Manfredi Graziani (Penn)	6	4

Final
Mans Dahlberg (Virginia); Dylan Dietrich (Virginia)	7^{3}	6
Nikita Filin (Ohio State); Brandon Carpico (Ohio State)	6	2

==== Top half ====
First round
1	Benito Sanchez Martinez (Mississippi State); Petar Jovanovic (Mississippi State)	6	6
Rudy Quan (UCLA); Aadarsh Tripathi (UCLA)	4	4
Johan Alexander Rodriguez (Oklahoma); Orel Kimhi (Oklahoma)	3	1
Mans Dahlberg (Virginia); Dylan Dietrich (Virginia)	6	6
5–8	Aidan Kim (Ohio State); Bryce Nakashima (Ohio State)	6	6
Matei Cristian Onofrei (Louisville); Andre Steinbach (Louisville)	1	1
Karim Al-Amin (Middle Tennessee); Onrej Horak (Middle Tennessee)	6	6
Tiago Silva (California); Timofey Stepanov (California)	3	4
3	Isac Stromberg (Ole Miss); Kai Milburn (Ole Miss)	6	6
Oscar Martinez (ETSU); Martin Vergara Del Puerto (ETSU)	0	3
Tanapatt Nirundorn (Florida); Henry Jefferson (Florida)	6	6
Sam Landau (Indiana); Facundo Yunis (Indiana)	3	4
5–8	Aleksa Krivokapic (Purdue); Maj Premzl (Purdue)	7^{8}	3	1
Max Stenzer (South Carolina); Sean Daryabeigi (South Carolina)	6	6	[10]
Ian Mayew (North Carolina); Kase Schinnerer (North Carolina)	6	6
Adam Chodur (BYU); Otto Schreiner (BYU)	1	2

Second round
1	B Sanchez Martinez (Mississippi State); P Jovanovic (Mississippi State)	3	6
M Dahlberg (Virginia); D Dietrich (Virginia)	6	7^{3}
5–8	A Kim (Ohio State); B Nakashima (Ohio State)	6	4	[13]
K Al-Amin (Middle Tennessee); O Horak (Middle Tennessee)	3	6	[10]
3	I Stromberg (Ole Miss); K Milburn (Ole Miss)	3	3
T Nirundorn (Florida); H Jefferson (Florida)	6	6
M Stenzer (South Carolina); S Daryabeigi (South Carolina)	7^{2}	6
I Mayew (North Carolina); K Schinnerer (North Carolina)	6	4

Quarterfinals
M Dahlberg (Virginia); D Dietrich (Virginia)	6	7^{5}	[10]
5–8	A Kim (Ohio State); B Nakashima (Ohio State)	7^{5}	6	5
T Nirundorn (Florida); H Jefferson (Florida)	6	6
M Stenzer (South Carolina); S Daryabeigi (South Carolina)	4	2

Semifinals
M Dahlberg (Virginia); D Dietrich (Virginia)	6	6
T Nirundorn (Florida); H Jefferson (Florida)	1	4

==== Bottom half ====
First round
Nikita Filin (Ohio State); Brandon Carpico (Ohio State)	7^{3}	7
Luis Felipe Miguel (Florida State); Erik Schiessl (Florida State)	6	5
Alex Chang (Stanford); Alexander Razeghi (Stanford)	6	6
5–8	Paul Inchauspe (Princeton); Landon Ardila (Princeton)	4	4
Chris Xu (North Carolina); Niels Ratiu (North Carolina)	3	6	8
Spencer Johnson (UCLA); Emon van Loben Sels (UCLA)	6	3	[10]
Petro Kuzmenok (Rice); Santiago Navarro (Rice)	2	2
4	Max Dahlin (Michigan); Bjorn Swenson (Michigan)	6	6
Aaron Sandler (Penn); Manfredi Graziani (Penn)	3	7^{2}	[10]
Luca Bluett (Santa Clara); John Kim (Santa Clara)	6	6	5
Tobey Lock (Delaware); Euan Mackenzie (Delaware)	3	6
5–8	Cosme Rolland De Ravel (TCU); Albert Pedrico Kravtsov (TCU)	6	7^{3}
Felipe Pinzon (Cornell); Petar Teodorovic (Cornell)	1	6
Zsombor Velcz (Baylor); Connor Henry Van Schalkwyk (Baylor)	6	7^{7}
Billy Blaydes (Auburn); Freddy Blaydes (Auburn)	6	3	6
2	DK Suresh (Wake Forest); Andrew Delgado (Wake Forest)	4	6	[10]

Second round
N Filin (Ohio State); B Carpico (Ohio State)	6	6
A Chang (Stanford); A Razeghi (Stanford)	4	4
S Johnson (UCLA); E van Loben Sels (UCLA)	5	6	7
4	M Dahlin (Michigan); B Swenson (Michigan)	7	4	[10]
A Sandler (Penn); M Graziani (Penn)	6	6
5–8	C R De Ravel (TCU); A Pedrico Kravtsov (TCU)	4	4
Z Velcz (Baylor); C H Van Schalkwyk (Baylor)	6	2
2	D Suresh (Wake Forest); A Delgado (Wake Forest)	7^{5}	6

Quarterfinals
N Filin (Ohio State); B Carpico (Ohio State)	6	6
4	M Dahlin (Michigan); B Swenson (Michigan)	2	1
A Sandler (Penn); M Graziani (Penn)	6	7	[10]
2	D Suresh (Wake Forest); A Delgado (Wake Forest)	7^{3}	5	7

Semifinals
N Filin (Ohio State); B Carpico (Ohio State)	7^{2}	6
A Sandler (Penn); M Graziani (Penn)	6	4
