= Andres Pedroso =

American tennis player

- Country (sports): United States
- Born: February 21, 1979 (age 47) New York City, New York, United States
- Plays: Right-handed
- Prize money: $69,938

Singles
- Career record: 0–1 (at ATP Tour level, Grand Slam level, and in Davis Cup)
- Career titles: 4 ITF
- Highest ranking: No. 271 (April 21, 2003)

Doubles
- Career record: 0–0 (at ATP Tour level, Grand Slam level, and in Davis Cup)
- Career titles: 1 Challenger, 2 ITF
- Highest ranking: No. 255 (August 16, 2004)
- Last updated on: June 25, 2018.

Andres Pedroso (born February 21, 1979) is an American tennis coach and former player. He is the current head coach of the Virginia Cavaliers tennis team at the University of Virginia.

Pedroso has a career high ATP singles ranking of 271 achieved on April 21, 2003. He also has a career high ATP doubles ranking of 255 achieved on August 16, 2004.

Pedroso has 1 ATP Challenger Tour title at the 2003 Torneo Internacional Challenger León.

In May 2017, Pedroso was named the Cavaliers’ director of tennis and head men's tennis coach, overseeing both the men's and women's tennis programs while also serving as the head coach of Virginia men's tennis. He has led Virginia the national championships in 2022, 2023, and 2026. He also won the Wilson ITA National Coach of the Year twice (2022, 2023) and Atlantic Coast Conference Coach of the year three times (2019, 2021, 2022).
