= 2023 NCAA Division I Men's Tennis Championships =

- Date: May 5–27, 2023
- Edition: 77th
- Location: Orlando, Florida
- Venue: USTA National Campus; Hosted by: UCF

Champions

Men's singles
- Ethan Quinn (Georgia)

Men's doubles
- Andrew Lautschaunig and James Trotter (Ohio State)

Men's team
- Virginia Cavaliers
- NCAA Division I Men's Tennis Championships

The 2023 NCAA Division I Men's Tennis Championships were the men's tennis tournaments played from May 5 to May 27, 2023, at campus sites and Orlando, Florida, at the USTA National Campus. It was the 77th edition of the NCAA Division I Men's Tennis Championship.

== Men's team championship ==
There were 64 teams selected for the men's team championship, 29 of which were automatic qualifiers from each Division I conference. The remaining 35 teams were selected at-large. Teams played two rounds of single-elimination matches in groups of four from May 5–6 or 6–7 at campus sites; the winners of those regionals advanced to a super-regional round on May 12 or 13, also held at campus sites. The remaining eight teams advanced to the championship rounds in Orlando, Florida.

=== Automatic qualifiers ===
The following 29 teams were automatic qualifiers, representing their conferences:

Conference	Team
American	SMU
Atlantic 10	VCU
ACC	Virginia
ASUN	Florida Gulf Coast
Big East	St. John's
Big Sky	Idaho
Big South	Presbyterian
Big Ten	Ohio State
Big 12	TCU
Big West	UC Santa Barbara
CAA	UNC Wilmington
Conference USA	Middle Tennessee
Horizon	Belmont
Ivy	Harvard
MAAC	Siena
MAC	Toledo
MEAC	South Carolina State
Mountain West	Boise State
Northeast	St. Francis Brooklyn
Pac-12	Southern California (USC)
Patriot	Navy
SEC	Kentucky
Southern	East Tennessee State
Southland	Texas A&M–Corpus Christi
SWAC	Alabama State
Summit	Drake
Sun Belt	Old Dominion
West Coast	Pepperdine
WAC	UT Arlington

=== National seeds ===
Sixteen teams were selected as national seeds and were guaranteed to host for the first two rounds if they submitted a bid and met the criteria.

1. Texas (semifinals)
2. TCU (semifinals)
3. Ohio State (runner-up)
4. Kentucky (quarterfinals)
5. Virginia (National Champions)
6. Georgia (quarterfinals)
7. Michigan (quarterfinals)
8. Tennessee (super regionals)
9. South Carolina (quarterfinals)
10. USC (super regionals)
11. Harvard (super regionals)
12. Duke (super regionals)
13. Columbia (second round)
14. Arizona (super regionals)
15. Mississippi State (super regionals)
16. North Carolina (super regionals)

=== Bracket ===
Bold indicates winner. Host institutions for the first two rounds and Super Regionals are marked with an asterisk (*).

**First Round**; May 5–6 or 6–7, 2023; Campus sites
1	**Texas***	**4**
Texas A&M–Corpus Christi	0
Austin, Texas
UTSA	1
**Pepperdine**	**4**
**Utah**	**4**
Old Dominion	1
Chapel Hill, North Carolina
Drake	1
16	**North Carolina***	**4**
9	**South Carolina***	**4**
South Carolina State	0
Columbia, South Carolina
Baylor	0
**Florida State**	**4**
**Wake Forest**	**4**
Memphis	1
Knoxville, Tennessee
Belmont	1
8	**Tennessee***	**4**
5	**Virginia***	**4**
Navy	0
Charlottesville, Virginia
VCU	0
**Ole Miss**	**4**
Auburn	3
**Cornell**	**4**
Durham, North Carolina
UNC Wilmington	2
12	**Duke***	**4**
13	**Columbia***	**4**
St. Francis Brooklyn	0
New York City, New York
St. John's	0
**Stanford**	**4**
**Northwestern**	**4**
UCLA	2
Lexington, Kentucky
Presbyterian	0
4	**Kentucky***	**4**
3	**Ohio State***	**4**
ETSU	0
Columbus, Ohio
**Louisville**	**4**
Texas Tech	3
Florida	2
**Oklahoma State**	**4**
Tucson, Arizona
Boise State	0
14	**Arizona***	**4**
11	**Harvard***	**4**
Siena	0
Cambridge, Massachusetts
**Arizona State**	**4**
Illinois	3
NC State	2
**Oklahoma**	**4**
Athens, Georgia
Florida Gulf Coast	0
6	**Georgia***	**4**
7	**Michigan***	**4**
Toledo	0
Ann Arbor, Michigan
LSU	1
**California**	**4**
**San Diego**	**4**
UC Santa Barbara	1
Los Angeles, California
Idaho	0
10	**USC***	**4**
15	**Mississippi State***	**4**
Alabama State	0
Starkville, Mississippi
Tulane	0
**Middle Tennessee**	**4**
**Texas A&M**	**4**
SMU	1
Fort Worth, Texas
UT Arlington	0
2	**TCU***	**4**

**Second Round**; May 5–6 or 6–7, 2023; Campus sites
1	**Texas**	**4**
Pepperdine	0
Utah	0
16	**North Carolina**	**4**
9	**South Carolina**	**4**
Florida State	1
Wake Forest	0
8	**Tennessee**	**4**
5	**Virginia**	**4**
Ole Miss	0
Cornell	1
12	**Duke**	**4**
13	Columbia	3
**Stanford**	**4**
Northwestern	3
4	**Kentucky**	**4**
3	**Ohio State**	**4**
Louisville	0
Oklahoma State	0
14	**Arizona**	**4**
11	**Harvard**	**4**
Arizona State	0
Oklahoma	1
6	**Georgia**	**4**
7	**Michigan**	**4**
California	0
San Diego	1
10	**USC**	**4**
15	**Mississippi State**	**4**
Middle Tennessee	2
Texas A&M	0
2	**TCU**	**4**

**Super Regionals**; May 12 or 13, 2023; Campus sites
1	**Texas***	**4**
16	North Carolina	0
9	**South Carolina**	**4**
8	Tennessee*	2
5	**Virginia***	**4**
12	Duke	0
Stanford	3
4	**Kentucky***	**4**
3	**Ohio State***	**4**
14	Arizona	2
11	Harvard	2
6	**Georgia***	**4**
7	**Michigan***	**4**
10	USC	3
15	Mississippi State	1
2	**TCU***	**4**

**Quarterfinals**; May 19, 2023; Orlando
1	**Texas**	**4**
9	South Carolina	0
5	**Virginia**	**4**
4	Kentucky	2
3	**Ohio State**	**4**
6	Georgia	3
7	Michigan	1
2	**TCU**	**4**

**Semifinals**; May 20, 2023; Orlando
1	Texas	1
5	**Virginia**	**4**
3	**Ohio State**	**4**
2	TCU	0

**Championship**; May 21, 2023; Orlando
5	**Virginia**	**4**
2	TCU	0

Bracket source:

== Men's singles championship ==
There were 64 singles players selected to the men's singles championship, 12 of which were automatic qualifiers from each Division I conference with an eligible team ranked in the ITA Top 125. The remaining 52 players were selected at-large. The tournament was played following the team championship from May 22 to 27 in Orlando, Florida.

Georgia redshirt freshman Ethan Quinn won the men's singles title against Michigan senior Ondrej Styler 6–7 (2), 7–6 (5), 6–2.

=== Automatic qualifiers ===
The following 12 players were automatic qualifiers, representing their conferences:

Conference	Player	Team
American	Adam Neff	SMU
A-10	Charles Bertimon	VCU
ACC	Melios Efstathiou	Wake Forest
Big 12	Eliot Spizzirri	Texas
Big South	Dusan Milanovic	Presbyterian
Big Ten	Ondrej Styler	Michigan
Big West	Andre Ilagan	Hawaii
CUSA	Stijn Slump	Middle Tennessee
Pac-12	Arthur Fery	Stanford
SEC	Johannus Monday	Tennessee
Ivy	Henry von der Schulenburg	Harvard
West Coast	Daniel de Jonge	Pepperdine

=== National seeds ===
The following sixteen players were seeded for this tournament:

1. Eliot Spizzirri (Texas)
2. Ethan Quinn (Georgia) (National Champion)
3. Arthur Fery (Stanford)
4. Melios Efstathiou (Wake Forest)
5. Johannus Monday (Tennessee)
6. Andres Martin (Georgia Tech)
7. Antoine Cornut-Chauvinc (Florida State)
8. Ondrej Styler (Michigan)

Players ranked 9th–16th, listed by last name

- Nishesh Basavareddy (Stanford)
- Sebastian Dominko (Notre Dame)
- Liam Draxl (Kentucky)
- Garrett Johns (Duke)
- Cannon Kingsley (Ohio State)
- Chris Rodesch (Virginia)
- Toby Samuel (South Carolina)
- Connor Thomson (South Carolina)

=== Draw ===
Bracket:

==== Finals ====
Quarterfinals
1	Eliot Spizzirri (Texas)	4	3
8	Ondrej Styler (Michigan)	6	6
3	Arthur Fery (Stanford)	6	5
Murphy Cassone (Arizona State)	7^{5}	7
9–16	Chris Rodesch (Virginia)	6	6
Alexander Bernard (Ohio State)	3	4
Andrew Fenty (Michigan)	2	4
2	Ethan Quinn (Georgia)	6	6

Semifinals
8	Ondrej Styler (Michigan)	6	6
Murphy Cassone (Arizona State)	1	2
9–16	Chris Rodesch (Virginia)	6	2	4
2	Ethan Quinn (Georgia)	2	6	6

Final
8	Ondrej Styler (Michigan)	7^{2}	6	2
2	Ethan Quinn (Georgia)	6	7^{5}	6

==== Section 1 ====
First round
1	Eliot Spizzirri (Texas)	6	6
Tyler Stice (Auburn)	2	1
JJ Tracy (Ohio State)	4	4
Jeffrey von der Schulenburg (Virginia)	6	6
9–16	Sebastian Dominko (Notre Dame)	6	6
Henry von der Schulenburg (Harvard)	4	3
Steven Forman (Northwestern)	4	3
Pedro Rodenas (Duke)	6	6
8	Ondrej Styler (Michigan)	7^{10}	6
Stefan Dostanic (USC)	6	2
Geronimo Busleiman (Utah)	2	6	3
Daniel de Jonge (Pepperdine)	6	1	6
Gavin Young (Michigan)	3	6	6
Karlis Ozolins (Illinois)	6	2	1
Olle Wallin (Texas Tech)	2	0
Michael Zheng (Columbia)	6	6

Second round
1	E Spizzirri (Texas)	6	6
J von der Schulenburg (Virginia)	3	4
9–16	S Dominko (Notre Dame)	4	6	4
P Rodenas (Duke)	6	1	6
8	O Styler (Michigan)	6	3	7^{4}
D de Jonge (Pepperdine)	3	6	6
G Young (Michigan)	3	6	0
M Zheng (Columbia)	6	3	6

Third round
1	E Spizzirri (Texas)	7	7^{3}
P Rodenas (Duke)	5	6
8	O Styler (Michigan)	7^{6}	7^{5}
M Zheng (Columbia)	6	6

Quarterfinals
1	E Spizzirri (Texas)	4	3
8	O Styler (Michigan)	6	6

==== Section 2 ====
First round
3	Arthur Fery (Stanford)	6	6
Emile Hudd (Tennessee)	4	2
Noah Schachter (Texas A&M)	4	6	7^{4}
Charles Bertimon (VCU)	6	2	6
9–16	Liam Draxl (Kentucky)	6	6
Brian Cernoch (North Carolina)	0	4
Jake Fearnley (TCU)	6	6	6
Yuta Kikuchi (California)	7^{4}	2	4
6	Andres Martin (Georgia Tech)	2	3
Micah Braswell (Texas)	6	6
Philip Henning (Georgia)	6	4
Dan Martin (Miami (FL))	7^{4}	6
9–16	Cannon Kingsley (Ohio State)	7^{0}	6	6
Colton Smith (Arizona)	6	7^{1}	1
Murphy Cassone (Arizona State)	6	7^{1}
Inaki Montes de la Torre (Virginia)	3	6

Second round
3	A Fery (Stanford)	7^{5}	6
N Schachter (Texas A&M)	6	1
9–16	L Draxl (Kentucky)	2	6	6
J Fearnley (TCU)	6	3	3
M Braswell (Texas)	7	6
D Martin (Miami (FL))	5	4
9–16	C Kingsley (Ohio State)	1	7^{3}	6
M Cassone (Arizona State)	6	6	7^{2}

Third round
3	A Fery (Stanford)	6	6
9–16	L Draxl (Kentucky)	1	1
M Braswell (Texas)	2	3
M Cassone (Arizona State)	6	6

Quarterfinals
3	A Fery (Stanford)	6	5
M Cassone (Arizona State)	7^{5}	7

==== Section 3 ====
First round
Dusan Milanovic (Presbyterian)	5	2
Joshua Lapadat (Kentucky)	7	6
Peter Makk (USC)	6	2
9–16	Chris Rodesch (Virginia)	7^{4}	6
Jonas Ziverts (Arizona)	7	6
Justin Boulais (Ohio State)	5	4
Axel Nefve (Florida)	6	1	6
7	Antoine Cornut-Chauvinc (Florida State)	3	6	3
Patrick Maloney (Michigan)	3	3
Andre Ilagan (Hawaii)	6	6
Siem Woldeab (Texas)	6	6
9–16	Garrett Johns (Duke)	4	4
Alexander Bernard (Ohio State)	3	6	7
Raphael Perot (Texas A&M)	5	4
Samir Banerjee (Stanford)	7	6
4	Melios Efstathiou (Wake Forest)	5	4

Second round
J Lapadat (Kentucky)	5	6	6
9–16	C Rodesch (Virginia)	7	4	7^{2}
J Ziverts (Arizona)	6	6	3
A Nefve (Florida)	7^{4}	2	6
A Ilagan (Hawaii)	7	6
S Woldeab (Texas)	5	4
A Bernard (Ohio State)	3	6	3
S Banerjee (Stanford)	6	4	1^{ret.}

Third round
9–16	C Rodesch (Virginia)	4	6	6
A Nefve (Florida)	6	4	4
A Ilagan (Hawaii)	1	7^{3}	4
A Bernard (Ohio State)	6	6	6

Quarterfinals
9–16	C Rodesch (Virginia)	6	6
A Bernard (Ohio State)	3	4

==== Section 4 ====
First round
James Trotter (Ohio State)	6	6	7
Alafia Ayeni (Kentucky)	7^{5}	2	5
Pierre-Yves Bailly (Texas)	2	1
9–16	Connor Thomson (South Carolina)	6	6
Andrew Fenty (Michigan)	5	7	6
Etienne Donnet (Louisville)	7	5	1
Ryan Fishback (Virginia Tech)	6	2	6
5	Johannus Monday (Tennessee)	4	6	2
Ozan Baris (Michigan State)	6	3	6
Harris Walker (Harvard)	4	6	3
Rafa Izquierdo Luque (NC State)	3	5
9–16	Nishesh Basavareddy (Stanford)	6	7
Ryan Seggerman (North Carolina)	6	7^{4}
Adam Neff (SMU)	4	6
Luc Fomba (TCU)	7^{7}	2	5
2	Ethan Quinn (Georgia)	6	6	7

Second round
J Trotter (Ohio State)	7	6
9–16	C Thomson (South Carolina)	5	1
A Fenty (Michigan)	6	6
R Fishback (Virginia Tech)	1	4
O Baris (Michigan State)	1	4
9–16	N Basavareddy (Stanford)	6	6
R Seggerman (North Carolina)	4	4
2	E Quinn (Georgia)	6	6

Third round
J Trotter (Ohio State)	2	6
A Fenty (Michigan)	6	7^{3}
9–16	N Basavareddy (Stanford)	3	6	5
2	E Quinn (Georgia)	6	4	7

Quarterfinals
A Fenty (Michigan)	2	4
2	E Quinn (Georgia)	6	6

== Men's doubles championship ==
There were 32 doubles teams selected to the men's doubles championship, 11 of whom were automatic qualifiers from each Division I conference with an eligible team ranked in the ITA Top 60. The remaining 21 teams were selected at-large. The tournament was played following the team championship from May 22 to 27 in Orlando, Florida.

Andrew Lutschaunig and James Trotter of Ohio State beat Cleeve Harper and Eliot Spizzirri of Texas to win the men's double title.

=== Automatic qualifiers ===
The following 11 teams were automatic qualifiers, representing their conferences:

Conference	Player	Team
American	Lleyton Cronje	UCF
American	Bogdan Pavel	UCF
ACC	Ryan Goetz	Virginia
ACC	Inaki Montes de la Torre	Virginia
Big 12	Jake Fearnley	TCU
Big 12	Luc Fomba	TCU
Big South	Maxwell Benson	Presbyterian
Big South	Dusan Milanovic	Presbyterian
Big Ten	Andrew Fenty	Michigan
Big Ten	Gavin Young	Michigan
CUSA	Alan Magadan	UTSA
CUSA	Sebastian Rodriguez	UTSA
Pac-12	Stefan Dostanic	USC
Pac-12	Bradley Frye	USC
SEC	Toby Samuel	South Carolina
SEC	Connor Thomson	South Carolina
Sun Belt	Jack Clements	South Alabama
Sun Belt	Louis Delcour	South Alabama
Ivy	Edoardo Graziani	Penn
Ivy	Kevin Zhu	Penn
West Coast	Daniel de Jonge	Pepperdine
West Coast	Tim Zeitvogel	Pepperdine

=== National seeds ===
The following eight teams were seeded for this tournament:

1. Toby Samuel / Connor Thomson (South Carolina)
2. Jake Fearnley / Luc Fomba (TCU)
3. Cleeve Harper / Eliot Spizzirri (Texas)
4. Trent Bryde / Ethan Quinn (Georgia)

Players ranked 5th–8th, listed by institution

- William Grant / Axel Nefve (Florida)
- Andrew Fenty / Gavin Young (Michigan)
- Patrick Harper / Johannus Monday (Tennessee)
- Ryan Goetz / Inaki Montes de la Torre (Virginia)

=== Draw ===
Bracket:

==== Finals ====
Semifinals
Andres Martin (Georgia Tech); Marcus McDaniel (Georgia Tech)	1	5
3	Cleeve Harper (Texas); Eliot Spizzirri (Texas)	6	7
Daniel de Jonge (Pepperdine); Tim Zeitvogel (Pepperdine)	6	6	4
Andrew Lutschaunig (Ohio State); James Trotter (Ohio State)	3	7^{2}	[10]

Final
3	Cleeve Harper (Texas); Eliot Spizzirri (Texas)	4	4
Andrew Lutschaunig (Ohio State); James Trotter (Ohio State)	6	6

==== Top half ====
First round
1	Toby Samuel (South Carolina); Connor Thomson (South Carolina)	4	2
Ozan Baris (Michigan State); Max Sheldon (Michigan State)	6	6
Jeremie Casabon (Vanderbilt); Siim Troost (Vanderbilt)	2	5
Andres Martin (Georgia Tech); Marcus McDaniel (Georgia Tech)	6	7
5–8	Andrew Fenty (Michigan); Gavin Young (Michigan)	6	6
Maxwell Benson (Presbyterian); Dusan Milanovic (Presbyterian)	1	3
Lleyton Cronje (UCF); Bogdan Pavel (UCF)	7^{5}	7^{4}
Casey Kania (North Carolina); Ryan Seggerman (North Carolina)	6	6
3	Cleeve Harper (Texas); Eliot Spizzirri (Texas)	6	7^{3}
Jordan Chrysostom (Virginia Tech); Ryan Fishback (Virginia Tech)	3	6
Robin Catry (NC State); Luca Staeheli (NC State)	4	4
Alan Magadan (UTSA); Sebastian Rodriguez (UTSA)	6	6
5–8	Patrick Harper (Tennessee); Johannus Monday (Tennessee)	4	7	6
Natan Rodrigues (Louisville); Fabien Salle (Louisville)	6	5	[10]
Raul Dobai (Auburn); Finn Murgett (Auburn)	6	6
Justin Boulais (Ohio State); Robert Cash (Ohio State)	4	4

Second round
O Baris (Michigan State); M Sheldon (Michigan State)	6	4
A Martin (Georgia Tech); M McDaniel (Georgia Tech)	7^{0}	6
5–8	A Fenty (Michigan); G Young (Michigan)	7	7^{1}
L Cronje (UCF); B Pavel (UCF)	5	6
3	C Harper (Texas); E Spizzirri (Texas)	7	6
A Magadan (UTSA); S Rodriguez (UTSA)	5	3
N Rodrigues (Louisville); F Salle (Louisville)	2	7	[10]
R Dobai (Auburn); F Murgett (Auburn)	6	5	8

Quarterfinals
A Martin (Georgia Tech); M McDaniel (Georgia Tech)	6	6
5–8	A Fenty (Michigan); G Young (Michigan)	2	3
3	C Harper (Texas); E Spizzirri (Texas)	6	6	[10]
N Rodrigues (Louisville); F Salle (Louisville)	2	7^{0}	5

Semifinals
A Martin (Georgia Tech); M McDaniel (Georgia Tech))	1	5
3	C Harper (Texas); E Spizzirri (Texas)	6	7

==== Bottom half ====
First round
Brian Cernoch (North Carolina); Benjamin Kittay (North Carolina)	2	5
Daniel de Jonge (Pepperdine); Tim Zeitvogel (Pepperdine)	6	7
Nishesh Basavareddy (Stanford); Arthur Fery (Stanford)	3	6	[10]
5–8	Ryan Goetz (Virginia); Inaki Montes de la Torre (Virginia)	6	0	5
Jack Clements (South Alabama); Louis Delcour (South Alabama)	2	5
Rafa Izquierdo Luque (NC State); Joseph Wayand (NC State)	6	7
Garrett Johns (Duke); Pedro Rodenas (Duke)	6	7^{5}
4	Trent Bryde (Georgia); Ethan Quinn (Georgia)	4	6
Tadeas Paroulek (Baylor); Zsombor Velcz (Baylor)	3	4
Andrew Lutschaunig (Ohio State); James Trotter (Ohio State)	6	6
Stefan Dostanic (USC); Bradley Frye (USC)	6	5	4
5–8	William Grant (Florida); Axel Nefve (Florida)	3	7	[10]
Antoine Cornut-Chauvinc (Florida State); Joshua Dous Kar (Florida State)	4	4
Edoardo Graziani (Penn); Kevin Zhu (Penn)	6	6
Sebastian Dominko (Notre Dame); Connor Fu (Notre Dame)	6	1	8
Hunter Heck (Illinois); Karlis Ozolins (Illinois)	4	6	[10]

Second round
D de Jonge (Pepperdine); T Zeitvogel (Pepperdine)	7^{7}	3	[10]
N Basavareddy (Stanford); A Fery (Stanford)	6	6	6
R Izquierdo Luque (NC State); J Wayand (NC State)	7	7^{5}
G Johns (Duke); P Rodenas (Duke)	5	6
A Lutschaunig (Ohio State); J Trotter (Ohio State)	6	6
5–8	W Grant (Florida); A Nefve (Florida)	4	2
E Graziani (Penn); K Zhu (Penn)	2	3
H Heck (Illinois); K Ozolins (Illinois)	6	6

Quarterfinals
D de Jonge (Pepperdine); T Zeitvogel (Pepperdine)	6	6
R Izquierdo Luque (NC State); J Wayand (NC State)	3	2
A Lutschaunig (Ohio State); J Trotter (Ohio State)	6	6	[10]
H Heck (Illinois); K Ozolins (Illinois)	2	7^{1}	8

Semifinals
D de Jonge (Pepperdine); T Zeitvogel (Pepperdine)	6	6	4
A Lutschaunig (Ohio State); J Trotter (Ohio State)	3	7^{2}	[10]
