= 2026 US Open – Day-by-day summaries =

Tennis tournament match results

The 2026 US Open August 25 - September 13 2026, described in detail, in the form of day-by-day summaries.

== Fan Week – Day 2 (August 25) ==
- Seeds out:
  - Mixed Doubles: Aryna Sabalenka / (Serbia) Novak Djokovic [1], (United States) Jessica Pegula / (United States) Taylor Fritz [2], (United States) Amanda Anisimova / (United States) Learner Tien [3]
- Schedule of Play

Matches on main courts
Matches on Arthur Ashe Stadium
| Event | Winner | Loser | Score |
|---|---|---|---|
| Mixed Doubles 1st Round | (Czech Republic) Kateřina Siniaková [Q] (United Kingdom) Henry Patten [Q] | Aryna Sabalenka [1] (Serbia) Novak Djokovic [1] | 1–4, 4–2, [10–2] |
| Mixed Doubles Quarter-finals | (Ukraine) Elina Svitolina [WC] (France) Gaël Monfils [WC] | (Czech Republic) Kateřina Siniaková [Q] (United Kingdom) Henry Patten [Q] | 5–4^{(8–6)}, 4–5^{(3–7)}, [10–8] |
| Mixed Doubles 1st Round | (Switzerland) Belinda Bencic [4] (Italy) Flavio Cobolli [4] | (United States) Taylor Townsend [WC] (Germany) Alexander Zverev [WC] | 4–2, 4–2 |
| Mixed Doubles 1st Round | (United States) Serena Williams [WC] (Spain) Carlos Alcaraz [WC] | (New Zealand) Erin Routliffe [Q] (United Kingdom) Lloyd Glasspool [Q] | 5–3, 4–1 |
| Mixed Doubles Quarter-finals | (Switzerland) Belinda Bencic [4] (Italy) Flavio Cobolli [4] | (United States) Serena Williams [WC] (Spain) Carlos Alcaraz [WC] | 5–4^{(7–4)}, 4–1 |
Matches on Louis Armstrong Stadium
| Event | Winner | Loser | Score |
| Mixed Doubles 1st Round | (Ukraine) Elina Svitolina [WC] (France) Gaël Monfils [WC] | (Philippines) Alexandra Eala (Canada) Félix Auger-Aliassime | 4–1, 4–1 |
| Mixed Doubles 1st Round | (Czech Republic) Karolína Muchová (Czech Republic) Jakub Menšík | (France) Kristina Mladenovic [LL] (El Salvador) Marcelo Arévalo [LL] | 4–1, 2–4, [10–7] |
| Mixed Doubles 1st Round | (United States) Emma Navarro [WC] (United States) Tommy Paul [WC] | (United States) Amanda Anisimova [3] (United States) Learner Tien [3] | 5–3, 4–2 |
| Mixed Doubles Quarter-finals | (Czech Republic) Karolína Muchová (Czech Republic) Jakub Menšík | (United States) Emma Navarro [WC] (United States) Tommy Paul [WC] | 4–1, 5–3 |
| Mixed Doubles 1st Round | Mirra Andreeva; Andrey Rublev | (Italy) Sara Errani [WC] (Italy) Andrea Vavassori [WC] | 1–4, 4–1, [11–9] |
| Mixed Doubles 1st Round | Diana Shnaider [WC] (Norway) Casper Ruud [WC] | (United States) Jessica Pegula [2] (United States) Taylor Fritz [2] | 4–2, 4–1 |
| Mixed Doubles Quarter-finals | Mirra Andreeva; Andrey Rublev | Diana Shnaider [WC] (Norway) Casper Ruud [WC] | 4–1, 4–5^{(9–11)}, [10–5] |
Matches began at 10am Eastern Daylight Time (EDT)

== Fan Week – Day 3 (August 26) ==
- Seeds out:
  - Mixed Doubles: (Switzerland) Belinda Bencic / (Italy) Flavio Cobolli [4]
- Schedule of Play

Matches on main courts
Matches on Arthur Ashe Stadium
| Event | Winner | Loser | Score |
|---|---|---|---|
| Mixed Doubles Semi-finals | (Switzerland) Belinda Bencic [4] (Italy) Flavio Cobolli [4] | (Ukraine) Elina Svitolina [WC] (France) Gaël Monfils [WC] | 4–5^{(7–9)}, 4–1, [10–5] |
| Mixed Doubles Semi-finals | (Czech Republic) Karolína Muchová (Czech Republic) Jakub Menšík | Mirra Andreeva; Andrey Rublev | 5–4^{(8–6)}, 3–5, [11–9] |
| Mixed Doubles Final | (Czech Republic) Karolína Muchová (Czech Republic) Jakub Menšík | (Switzerland) Belinda Bencic [4] (Italy) Flavio Cobolli [4] | 6–3, 1–6, [10–6] |
Colored background indicates a night match
Matches began at 7pm Eastern Daylight Time (EDT)

== Day 1 (August 30) ==
For the second straight year, there was no opening night ceremony.

- Seeds out:
  - Men's Singles: (Serbia) Novak Djokovic [4], (United Kingdom) Cameron Norrie [29]
  - Women's Singles: (Czech Republic) Barbora Krejčíková [27]
- Schedule of Play

Matches on main courts
Matches on Arthur Ashe Stadium
| Event | Winner | Loser | Score |
|---|---|---|---|
| Women's Singles 1st Round | (United States) Jessica Pegula [3] | (Romania) Elena-Gabriela Ruse | 6–3, 6–2 |
| Men's Singles 1st Round | Daniil Medvedev [7] | (France) Hugo Gaston [Q] | 6–4, 6–2, 6–4 |
| Men's Singles 1st Round | (Argentina) Mariano Navone | (Serbia) Novak Djokovic [4] | 7–6^{(7–5)}, 5–7, 4–6, 6–2, 6–1 |
| Women's Singles 1st Round | (United States) Sofia Kenin [WC] | (United States) Venus Williams [WC] | 6–2, 7–6^{(8–6)} |
Matches on Louis Armstrong Stadium
| Event | Winner | Loser | Score |
| Women's Singles 1st Round | (Italy) Jasmine Paolini [19] | (Slovenia) Veronika Erjavec | 6–3, 3–6, 6–4 |
| Men's Singles 1st Round | (United States) Tommy Paul [20] | (Hong Kong) Coleman Wong [Q] | 6–7^{(3–7)}, 6–1, 6–3, 6–3 |
| Women's Singles 1st Round | (Ukraine) Elina Svitolina [9] | (Argentina) Solana Sierra | 6–1, 6–2 |
| Men's Singles 1st Round | (Kazakhstan) Alexander Bublik [15] | (United States) J. J. Wolf [WC] | 6–4, 6–2, 3–6, 6–1 |
Matches on Grandstand
| Event | Winner | Loser | Score |
| Men's Singles 1st Round | (Czech Republic) Jiří Lehečka [18] | (Spain) Pablo Carreño Busta | 6–1, 7–6^{(7–5)}, 4–6, 6–2 |
| Women's Singles 1st Round | (Ukraine) Marta Kostyuk [11] | (Australia) Storm Hunter [Q] | 6–4, 6–1 |
| Men's Singles 1st Round | (Canada) Denis Shapovalov | (Serbia) Miomir Kecmanović | 6–4, 4–6, 6–4, 6–1 |
| Women's Singles 1st Round | (United States) Emma Navarro [26] vs (France) Loïs Boisson [PR] | | 7–6^{(8–6)}, 4–2, suspended |
Matches on Stadium 17
| Event | Winner | Loser | Score |
| Women's Singles 1st Round | (Uzbekistan) Kamilla Rakhimova | (Czech Republic) Barbora Krejčíková [27] | 7–6^{(7–4)}, 6–2 |
| Women's Singles 1st Round | (Canada) Leylah Fernandez [31] | (China) Zhang Shuai | 6–3, 6–2 |
| Men's Singles 1st Round | (Portugal) Jaime Faria | (United States) Jenson Brooksby | 6–3, 7–6^{(7–4)}, 4–6, 1–6, 6–2 |
| Men's Singles 1st Round | (United States) Alex Michelsen vs (Italy) Federico Cinà [Q] | | 6–4, 1–1, postponed |
Colored background indicates a night match
Day matches began at 11am (12 pm Arthur Ashe Stadium), night matches began at 7pm Eastern Daylight Time (EDT)

== Day 2 (August 31) ==
- Seeds out:
  - Men's Singles: (France) Arthur Fils [10], (Italy) Matteo Arnaldi [30]
  - Women's Singles: (Poland) Maja Chwalińska [20], (Czech Republic) Sára Bejlek [28]
- Schedule of Play

Matches on main courts
Matches on Arthur Ashe Stadium
| Event | Winner | Loser | Score |
|---|---|---|---|
| Women's Singles 1st Round | Aryna Sabalenka [1] | (Colombia) Camila Osorio | 6–2, 6–4 |
| Men's Singles 1st Round | (Spain) Carlos Alcaraz [2] | Roman Safiullin | 6–4, 6–4, 6–4 |
| Men's Singles 1st Round | (United States) Ben Shelton [8] | (Netherlands) Tallon Griekspoor | 1–6, 6–1, 7–6^{(7–3)}, 6–2 |
| Women's Singles 1st Round | (Japan) Naomi Osaka [13] | Anastasia Zakharova | 7–6^{(8–6)}, 7–6^{(7–3)} |
Matches on Louis Armstrong Stadium
| Event | Winner | Loser | Score |
| Men's Singles 1st Round | (Greece) Stefanos Tsitsipas | (France) Arthur Fils [10] | 4–6, 7–6^{(7–3)}, 6–1, 6–4 |
| Women's Singles 1st Round | (United States) Amanda Anisimova [10] | (United States) Ashlyn Krueger | 6–1, 6–3 |
| Women's Singles 1st Round (Note: This match was originally scheduled to play on Court 11 but was moved to Louis Armstrong Stadium after the conclusion of Anisimova–Krueger match.) | (Czech Republic) Linda Nosková [6] | (United States) Katie Volynets | 7–5, 6–1 |
| Women's Singles 1st Round | (Poland) Iga Świątek [8] | (China) Wang Xiyu | 6–2, 6–3 |
| Men's Singles 1st Round | (United States) Frances Tiafoe [11] | (United States) Martin Damm | 6–4, 4–6, 3–6, 6–3, 6–4 |
Matches on Grandstand
| Event | Winner | Loser | Score |
| Women's Singles 1st Round | (Czech Republic) Karolína Muchová [7] | (Austria) Sinja Kraus | 6–3, 6–0 |
| Women's Singles 1st Round | (United States) Emma Navarro [26] | (France) Loïs Boisson [PR] | 7–6^{(8–6)}, 6–7^{(1–7)}, 6–3 |
| Women's Singles 1st Round | (United States) Taylor Townsend | (Poland) Maja Chwalińska [20] | 6–2, 6–3 |
| Men's Singles 1st Round | (Italy) Matteo Berrettini | (Switzerland) Stan Wawrinka [WC] | 7–6^{(7–4)}, 7–6^{(7–3)}, 6–0 |
| Men's Singles 1st Round | (Canada) Félix Auger-Aliassime [3] | (Australia) Rinky Hijikata | 7–5, 4–6, 6–3, 7–5 |
Matches on Stadium 17
| Event | Winner | Loser | Score |
| Women's Singles 1st Round | (China) Zheng Qinwen [Q] | Kristina Liutova [Q] | 4–6, 6–3, 6–1 |
| Men's Singles 1st Round | (United States) Alex Michelsen | (Italy) Federico Cinà [Q] | 6–4, 6–1, 6–0 |
| Men's Singles 1st Round | (United States) Brandon Nakashima [16] | (Argentina) Sebastián Báez | 6–2, 6–1, 6–0 |
| Women's Singles 1st Round | (United States) Sloane Stephens [WC] | (Denmark) Clara Tauson | 6–4, 6–1 |
| Men's Singles 1st Round | (United States) Learner Tien [14] | (Portugal) Nuno Borges | 6–4, 6–1, 6–2 |
Colored background indicates a night match
Day matches began at 11am (11:30 am Arthur Ashe Stadium), night matches began at 7pm Eastern Daylight Time (EDT)

== Day 3 (September 1) ==
- Seeds out:
  - Women's Singles: (Switzerland) Belinda Bencic [12]
- Schedule of Play

Matches on main courts
Matches on Arthur Ashe Stadium
| Event | Winner | Loser | Score |
|---|---|---|---|
| Women's Singles 1st Round | (United States) Madison Keys [22] | Alina Korneeva | 7–5, 6–4 |
| Men's Singles 1st Round | (United States) Taylor Fritz [9] | (United States) Darwin Blanch [WC] | 6–3, 6–2, 6–4 |
| Women's Singles 1st Round | (United States) Coco Gauff [4] | (Turkey) Zeynep Sönmez | 6–3, 6–4 |
| Men's Singles 1st Round | (Germany) Alexander Zverev [1] | (Italy) Lorenzo Sonego | 6–4, 3–6, 6–7^{(7–9)}, 7–5, 6–4 |
Matches on Louis Armstrong Stadium
| Event | Winner | Loser | Score |
| Men's Singles 1st Round | (Italy) Flavio Cobolli [5] | (Argentina) Francisco Comesaña | 3–6, 2–6, 6–3, 6–4, 6–4 |
| Women's Singles 1st Round | Mirra Andreeva [5] | (Indonesia) Janice Tjen | 6–2, 6–2 |
| Men's Singles 1st Round | (France) Gaël Monfils [WC] | (Paraguay) Adolfo Daniel Vallejo | 2–6, 6–1, 6–2, 6–0 |
| Women's Singles 1st Round | (Philippines) Alexandra Eala [17] | (United States) Mary Stoiana [Q] | 6–1, 6–2 |
Matches on Grandstand
| Event | Winner | Loser | Score |
| Women's Singles 1st Round | (Kazakhstan) Elena Rybakina [2] | (United States) Thea Frodin [WC] | 6–3, 6–2 |
| Men's Singles 1st Round | (Italy) Lorenzo Musetti [13] | (United Kingdom) Arthur Fery | 6–3, 6–3, 7–5 |
| Women's Singles 1st Round | (United States) Iva Jovic [14] vs (Poland) Magdalena Fręch | | 4–4, suspended |
| Men's Singles 1st Round | (Italy) Andrea Guerrieri [Q] vs (Australia) Alex de Minaur [6] | | Cancelled |
Matches on Stadium 17
| Event | Winner | Loser | Score |
| Women's Singles 1st Round | (Kazakhstan) Elena Rybakina [2] | (United States) Thea Frodin [WC] | 4–6, 6–3, 6–1 |
| Men's Singles 1st Round | (Italy) Lorenzo Musetti [13] | (United Kingdom) Arthur Fery | 6–3, 6–2 |
| Women's Singles 1st Round | (United States) Iva Jovic [14] vs (Poland) Magdalena Fręch | | 4–4, postponed |
| Men's Singles 1st Round | (Italy) Andrea Guerrieri [Q] vs (Australia) Alex de Minaur [6] | | cancelled |
Colored background indicates a night match
Day matches began at 11am (11:30 am Arthur Ashe Stadium), night matches began at 7pm Eastern Daylight Time (EDT)

== Day 4 (September 2) ==
- Seeds out:
  - Men's Singles: (Spain) Rafael Jódar [12], (United States) Brandon Nakashima [16], Andrey Rublev [23]
  - Women's Singles: (Latvia) Jeļena Ostapenko [30]
- Schedule of Play

Matches on main courts
Matches on Arthur Ashe Stadium
| Event | Winner | Loser | Score |
|---|---|---|---|
| Women's Singles 2nd Round | (United States) Jessica Pegula [3] | (United States) Sofia Kenin [WC] | 6–3, 6–1 |
| Men's Singles 2nd Round | (United States) Ben Shelton [8] | (Poland) Hubert Hurkacz | 6–3, 5–7, 7–6^{(7–3)}, 7–5 |
| Women's Singles 2nd Round | Aryna Sabalenka [1] | Polina Iatcenko [Q] | 6–1, 6–1 |
| Men's Singles 2nd Round | (Spain) Carlos Alcaraz [2] | (Portugal) Jaime Faria | 4–6, 6–0, 6–3, 6–2 |
Matches on Louis Armstrong Stadium
| Event | Winner | Loser | Score |
| Men's Singles 2nd Round | Daniil Medvedev [7] | (United States) Sebastian Gorzny [WC] | 6–1, 6–3, 7–5 |
| Women's Singles 2nd Round | (Ukraine) Marta Kostyuk [11] | (United States) Sloane Stephens [WC] | 6–1, 7–5 |
| Women's Singles 2nd Round (Note: This match was originally scheduled to play on Court 6 but was moved to Louis Armstrong Stadium after the conclusion of Kostyuk-Stephens match.) | (Czech Republic) Karolína Muchová [7] | (United Kingdom) Katie Boulter | 6–1, 6–0 |
| Men's Singles 2nd Round | (United States) Frances Tiafoe [11] | (Japan) Rei Sakamoto [Q] | 6–3, 7–6^{(7–2)}, 7–5 |
| Women's Singles 2nd Round | (Czech Republic) Linda Nosková [6] | (Thailand) Lanlana Tararudee | 6–4, 6–2 |
Matches on Grandstand
| Event | Winner | Loser | Score |
| Men's Singles 2nd Round | (United States) Alex Michelsen | (United States) Brandon Nakashima [16] | 6–3, 6–4, 6–4 |
| Women's Singles 2nd Round | (United States) Emma Navarro [26] | (United States) Caty McNally | 3–6, 6–2, 6–3 |
| Women's Singles 1st Round | (United States) Iva Jovic [14] | (Poland) Magdalena Fręch | 7–5, 6–3 |
| Men's Singles 2nd Round | (United States) Tommy Paul [20] | (Croatia) Dino Prižmić | 6–2, 6–3, 5–7, 6–4 |
Matches on Stadium 17
| Event | Winner | Loser | Score |
| Women's Singles 2nd Round | (United States) Taylor Townsend | (Australia) Taylah Preston [WC] | 6–1, 6–1 |
| Women's Singles 1st Round | (Spain) Paula Badosa | (Australia) Daria Kasatkina | 6–1, 6–4 |
| Men's Singles 1st Round | (China) Bu Yunchaokete [LL] | (Spain) Rafael Jódar [12] | 6–2, 6–1, 6–1 |
| Men's Singles 2nd Round | (Greece) Stefanos Tsitsipas | (South Africa) Lloyd Harris [Q] | 6–7^{(1–7)}, 6–3, 7–6^{(7–4)}, 6–4 |
Colored background indicates a night match
Day matches began at 11am (11:30 am Arthur Ashe Stadium), night matches began at 7pm Eastern Daylight Time (EDT)

== Day 5 (September 3) ==
- Seeds out:
  - Men's Singles: (Canada) Félix Auger-Aliassime [3], (Australia) Alex de Minaur [6], (Italy) Lorenzo Musetti [13], (Peru) Ignacio Buse [32]
  - Women's Singles: (Greece) Maria Sakkari [32]
  - Women's Doubles: (China) Guo Hanyu / (France) Kristina Mladenovic [5], (Japan) Shuko Aoyama / (Chinese Taipei) Liang En-shuo [11], (Norway) Ulrikke Eikeri / (United States) Quinn Gleason [15]
- Schedule of Play

Matches on main courts
Matches on Arthur Ashe Stadium
| Event | Winner | Loser | Score |
|---|---|---|---|
| Women's Singles 2nd Round | (Japan) Naomi Osaka [13] | (Czech Republic) Kateřina Siniaková | 6–2, 5–7, 6–1 |
| Men's Singles 2nd Round | (United States) Taylor Fritz [9] | (Italy) Mattia Bellucci | 6–0, 6–1, 6–1 |
| Women's Singles 2nd Round | (United States) Coco Gauff [4] | (Spain) Paula Badosa | 6–4, 7–6^{(7–5)} |
| Men's Singles 2nd Round | (Germany) Alexander Zverev [1] | (France) Quentin Halys | 6–4, 4−6, 7–6^{(7–3)}, 6–7^{(3–7)}, 6–3 |
Matches on Louis Armstrong Stadium
| Event | Winner | Loser | Score |
| Men's Singles 2nd Round | Karen Khachanov | (Canada) Félix Auger-Aliassime [3] | 6–7^{(5–7)}, 6–3, 6–2, 6–2 |
| Women's Singles 2nd Round | (Philippines) Alexandra Eala [17] | (Ukraine) Oleksandra Oliynykova | 6–1, 6–4 |
| Men's Singles 2nd Round | (United States) Learner Tien [14] | (France) Gaël Monfils [WC] | 6–3, 6–4, 6–3 |
| Women's Singles 2nd Round | (Kazakhstan) Elena Rybakina [2] | (Spain) Jéssica Bouzas Maneiro | 6–2, 6–4 |
Matches on Grandstand
| Event | Winner | Loser | Score |
| Women's Singles 2nd Round | (Poland) Iga Świątek [8] | (Argentina) Nadia Podoroska [PR] | 6–3, 6–2 |
| Women's Singles 2nd Round | (United States) Amanda Anisimova [10] | (Austria) Lilli Tagger | 6–3, 3–6, 6–1 |
| Men's Singles 2nd Round | (Italy) Flavio Cobolli [5] | (Australia) Tristan Schoolkate [Q] | 3–6, 6–3, 6–4, 7–5 |
| Men's Singles 2nd Round | (Netherlands) Botic van de Zandschulp | (Australia) Alex de Minaur [6] | 6–4, 7–5, 6–2 |
Matches on Stadium 17
| Event | Winner | Loser | Score |
| Women's Singles 2nd Round | (United States) Madison Keys [22] | (Hungary) Anna Bondár | 5–7, 6–4, 7–6^{(10–5)} |
| Men's Singles 2nd Round | (Australia) Dane Sweeny [WC] | (Italy) Lorenzo Musetti [13] | 3–6, 6–1, 6–2, 6–2 |
| Women's Singles 2nd Round | Mirra Andreeva [5] | (Germany) Eva Lys | 6–0, 6–2 |
| Women's Singles 2nd Round | (United States) Iva Jovic [14] | (United Kingdom) Francesca Jones [Q] | 6–4, 6–4 |
Colored background indicates a night match
Day matches began at 11am (11:30 am Arthur Ashe Stadium), night matches began at 7pm Eastern Daylight Time (EDT)

== Day 6 (September 4) ==
- Seeds out:
  - Men's Singles: (Kazakhstan) Alexander Bublik [15], (Czech Republic) Jiří Lehečka [18], (Monaco) Valentin Vacherot [22], (France) Arthur Rinderknech [26]
  - Women's Singles: (Czech Republic) Karolína Muchová [7], (Ukraine) Elina Svitolina [9], Diana Shnaider [15], Ekaterina Alexandrova [18], (Italy) Jasmine Paolini [19], (Canada) Leylah Fernandez [31]
  - Men's Doubles: (Brazil) Orlando Luz / (Brazil) Rafael Matos [8], (Germany) Constantin Frantzen / (Netherlands) Robin Haase [14]
  - Women's Doubles: (Slovakia) Tereza Mihalíková / (United Kingdom) Olivia Nicholls [12]
- Schedule of Play

Matches on main courts
Matches on Arthur Ashe Stadium
| Event | Winner | Loser | Score |
|---|---|---|---|
| Women's Singles 3rd Round | (United States) Jessica Pegula [4] | (Canada) Leylah Fernandez [31] | 1–6, 6–4, 6–3 |
| Men's Singles 3rd Round | (Spain) Carlos Alcaraz [2] | (China) Wu Yibing | 6–3, 6–4, 6–1 |
| Women's Doubles 1st Round | (Chinese Taipei) Chan Hao-ching [14] (Australia) Maya Joint [14] | (United States) Serena Williams [WC] (United States) Venus Williams [WC] | 6–3, 6–7^{(6–8)}, 7–6^{(10–7)} |
| Men's Singles 3rd Round | (United States) Ben Shelton [8] | (Canada) Denis Shapovalov | 7–6^{(7–3)}, 6–7^{(5–7)}, 6–3, 6–4 |
Matches on Louis Armstrong Stadium
| Event | Winner | Loser | Score |
| Women's Singles 3rd Round | Aryna Sabalenka [1] | (Uzbekistan) Kamilla Rakhimova | 6–3, 6–4 |
| Men's Singles 3rd Round | (United States) Tommy Paul [20] | (Kazakhstan) Alexander Bublik [15] | 6–4, 3–6, 6–7^{(4–7)}, 6–1, 6–3 |
| Men's Singles 3rd Round | (United States) Frances Tiafoe [11] | (Monaco) Valentin Vacherot [22] | 6–4, 6–2, 6–4 |
| Women's Singles 3rd Round | Anna Kalinskaya [21] | (Ukraine) Elina Svitolina [9] | 6–3, 2–6, 6–3 |
Matches on Grandstand
| Event | Winner | Loser | Score |
| Women's Singles 3rd Round | (Ukraine) Marta Kostyuk [11] | Ekaterina Alexandrova [18] | 6–3, 6–2 |
| Men's Singles 3rd Round | Daniil Medvedev [7] | (France) Arthur Rinderknech [26] | 6–4, 6–4, 6–4 |
| Women's Singles 3rd Round | (United States) Emma Navarro [26] | (Czech Republic) Karolína Muchová [7] | 6–3, 7–5 |
| Men's Singles 3rd Round | (Greece) Stefanos Tsitsipas | (Czech Republic) Jiří Lehečka [18] | 2–6, 6–1, 7–6^{(7–3)}, 6–1 |
Matches on Stadium 17
| Event | Winner | Loser | Score |
| Women's Singles 3rd Round | (Romania) Sorana Cîrstea [16] | (Italy) Jasmine Paolini [19] | 6–3, 6–3 |
| Women's Singles 3rd Round | (United States) Taylor Townsend | Diana Shnaider [15] | 6–2, 6–7^{(3–7)}, 6–3 |
| Women's Singles 3rd Round | (Czech Republic) Linda Nosková [6] | (United States) Ann Li [29] | 6–2, 6–7^{(6–8)}, 6–2 |
| Men's Singles 3rd Round | (United States) Alex Michelsen | (Argentina) Tomás Martín Etcheverry [27] | 7–6^{(7–5)}, 6–4, 6–3 |
Colored background indicates a night match
Day matches began at 11am (11:30 am Arthur Ashe Stadium), night matches began at 7pm Eastern Daylight Time (EDT)

== Day 7 (September 5) ==
- Seeds out:
  - Men's Singles: (Italy) Flavio Cobolli [5], (United States) Taylor Fritz [9], (Czech Republic) Jakub Menšík [17], (Chile) Alejandro Tabilo [25]
  - Women's Singles: (United States) Amanda Anisimova [10], (Philippines) Alexandra Eala [17], (United States) Madison Keys [22], (Belgium) Elise Mertens [23], (Czech Republic) Marie Bouzková [25]
- Schedule of Play

Matches on main courts
Matches on Arthur Ashe Stadium
| Event | Winner | Loser | Score |
|---|---|---|---|
| Men's Singles 3rd Round | (Argentina) Francisco Cerúndolo [24] | (United States) Taylor Fritz [9] | 3–6, 4–6, 6–3, 6–4, 6–4 |
| Women's Singles 3rd Round | (United States) Coco Gauff [4] | (Spain) Cristina Bucșa | 6–3, 6–4 |
| Women's Singles 3rd Round | (United States) Iva Jovic [14] | (Philippines) Alexandra Eala [17] | 7–5, 3–6, 7–5 |
| Men's Singles 3rd Round | (Germany) Alexander Zverev [1] | (Chile) Alejandro Tabilo [25] | 6–2, 7–6^{(7–2)}, 6–2 |
Matches on Louis Armstrong Stadium
| Event | Winner | Loser | Score |
| Women's Singles 3rd Round | (Austria) Anastasia Potapova [24] | (United States) Amanda Anisimova [10] | 6–2, 7–5 |
| Men's Singles 3rd Round | (Belgium) Alexander Blockx [28] | (Italy) Flavio Cobolli [5] | 6–7^{(4–7)}, 6–3, 6–0, 6–3 |
| Women's Singles 3rd Round | (Japan) Naomi Osaka [13] | (Belgium) Elise Mertens [23] | 6–3, 3–6, 7–5 |
| Men's Singles 3rd Round | (United States) Learner Tien [14] | (Czech Republic) Jakub Menšík [17] | 6–3, 1–6, 6–7^{(2–7)}, 6–3, 6–4 |
Matches on Grandstand
| Event | Winner | Loser | Score |
| Women's Singles 3rd Round | (China) Zheng Qinwen [Q] | (United States) Madison Keys [22] | 1–6, 7–6^{(7–3)}, 7–5 |
| Women's Singles 3rd Round | (Poland) Iga Świątek [8] | (Czech Republic) Marie Bouzková [25] | 7–6^{(7–3)}, 7–6^{(7–3)} |
| Men's Singles 3rd Round | (France) Arthur Géa [LL] | (United States) Michael Zheng [WC] | 7–6^{(9–7)}, 3–6, 4–6, 6–3, 6–2 |
| Women's Singles 3rd Round | (Kazakhstan) Elena Rybakina [2] | (Ukraine) Yuliia Starodubtseva | 7–6^{(8–6)}, 6–3 |
Matches on Stadium 17
| Event | Winner | Loser | Score |
| Women's Doubles 2nd Round | (New Zealand) Erin Routliffe [9] (Indonesia) Aldila Sutjiadi [9] | (Canada) Leylah Fernandez (Indonesia) Janice Tjen | 6–4, 6–4 |
| Women's Singles 3rd Round | Mirra Andreeva [5] | (Czech Republic) Nikola Bartůňková | 6–2, 7–6^{(7–5)} |
| Men's Singles 3rd Round | Karen Khachanov | (France) Benjamin Bonzi | 6–3, 6–4, 6–2 |
| Men's Singles 3rd Round | (Netherlands) Botic van de Zandschulp | (Belgium) Zizou Bergs [31] | 3–6, 7–6^{(7–3)}, 4–6, 7–6^{(8–6)}, 6–3 |
Colored background indicates a night match
Day matches began at 11am (11:30 am Arthur Ashe Stadium), night matches began at 7pm Eastern Daylight Time (EDT)

== Day 8 (September 6) ==
- Seeds out:
  - Men's Singles: Daniil Medvedev [7], (United States) Tommy Paul [20], (Argentina) Tomás Martín Etcheverry [27]
  - Women's Singles: (Ukraine) Marta Kostyuk [11], (Romania) Sorana Cîrstea [16], Anna Kalinskaya [21]
  - Men's Doubles: (France) Théo Arribagé / (France) Albano Olivetti [10]
  - Women's Doubles: (Kazakhstan) Anna Danilina / (Serbia) Aleksandra Krunić [3], (United States) Asia Muhammad / (Hungary) Fanny Stollár [16]
- Schedule of Play

Matches on main courts
Matches on Arthur Ashe Stadium
| Event | Winner | Loser | Score |
|---|---|---|---|
| Women's Singles 4th Round | Aryna Sabalenka [1] | (United States) Taylor Townsend | 6–4, 6–3 |
| Men's Singles 4th Round | (Spain) Carlos Alcaraz [2] | (United States) Tommy Paul [20] | 6–4, 6–3, 6–4 |
| Men's Singles 4th Round | (United States) Ben Shelton [8] | (Greece) Stefanos Tsitsipas | 6–2, 6–3, 6–4 |
| Women's Singles 4th Round | (United States) Emma Navarro [26] | Anna Kalinskaya [21] | 6–4, 6–2 |
Matches on Louis Armstrong Stadium
| Event | Winner | Loser | Score |
| Men's Doubles 2nd Round | (Finland) Harri Heliövaara [1] (United Kingdom) Henry Patten [1] | (Italy) Matteo Arnaldi (Germany) Jan-Lennard Struff | 7–5, 6–2 |
| Women's Singles 4th Round | (Czech Republic) Linda Nosková [6] | (Ukraine) Marta Kostyuk [11] | 7–5, 5–7, 6–4 |
| Men's Singles 4th Round | (United States) Frances Tiafoe [11] | Daniil Medvedev [7] | 7–6^{(7–1)}, 6−4, 7–6^{(8−6)} |
| Women's Singles 4th Round | (United States) Jessica Pegula [3] | (Romania) Sorana Cîrstea [16] | 6–3, 6–4 |
Matches on Grandstand
| Event | Winner | Loser | Score |
| Men's Doubles 2nd Round | (United States) Brandon Carpico [WC] (United States) Nikita Filin [WC] | (Brazil) Marcelo Melo (Australia) John Peers | 3–6, 7–6^{(7–0)}, 6–4 |
| Women's Doubles 2nd Round | (Japan) Eri Hozumi (Slovenia) Andreja Klepač | (United States) Asia Muhammad [16] (Hungary) Fanny Stollár [16] | 6–4, 6–4 |
| Men's Singles 4th Round | (United States) Alex Michelsen | (Argentina) Tomás Martín Etcheverry [27] | 7–6^{(8–6)}, 6–4, 6–4 |
| Men's Doubles 2nd Round | (Italy) Simone Bolelli (Italy) Andrea Vavassori [4] | (Belgium) Sander Gillé (Netherlands) Sem Verbeek | 6–3, 6–4 |
Matches on Stadium 17
| Event | Winner | Loser | Score |
| Men's Doubles 2nd Round | (Argentina) Máximo González (Argentina) Andrés Molteni | (Czech Republic) Petr Nouza (Austria) Neil Oberleitner | 7–6^{(9–7)}, 6–3 |
| Women's Doubles 2nd Round | (Germany) Tatjana Maria (Turkey) Zeynep Sönmez | (Kazakhstan) Anna Danilina [3] (Serbia) Aleksandra Krunić [3] | 6–1, 5–6, retired |
| Men's Doubles 2nd Round | (Austria) Lucas Miedler [13] (Australia) Marc Polmans [13] | (United States) Robert Cash (Austria) Alexander Erler | 2–6, 6–3, 6–4 |
| Men's Doubles 2nd Round | (United States) Rajeev Ram (United Kingdom) Joe Salisbury | (France) Théo Arribagé [10] (France) Albano Olivetti [10] | 6–7^{(2–7)}, 7–6^{(11–9)}, 6–4 |
Colored background indicates a night match
Day matches began at 11am (11:30 am Arthur Ashe Stadium), night matches began at 7pm Eastern Daylight Time (EDT)

== Day 9 (September 7) ==
- Seeds out:
  - Men's Singles: (United States) Learner Tien [14], (Italy) Luciano Darderi [21], (Argentina) Francisco Cerúndolo [24]
  - Women's Singles: (Poland) Iga Świątek [8], (Japan) Naomi Osaka [13], (United States) Iva Jovic [14], (Austria) Anastasia Potapova [24]
  - Men's Doubles: (France) Sadio Doumbia / (France) Fabien Reboul [11]
  - Women's Doubles: (Australia) Ellen Perez / (Netherlands) Demi Schuurs [10], (Australia) Storm Hunter / (United States) Desirae Krawczyk [13], (Chinese Taipei) Chan Hao-ching / (Australia) Maya Joint [14]
- Schedule of Play

Matches on main courts
Matches on Arthur Ashe Stadium
| Event | Winner | Loser | Score |
|---|---|---|---|
| Women's Singles 4th Round | (China) Zheng Qinwen [Q] | (Poland) Iga Świątek [8] | 7–5, 6–3 |
| Men's Singles 4th Round | (Belgium) Alexander Blockx [28] | (Argentina) Francisco Cerúndolo [24] | 6–3, 4–6, 7–5, 7–5 |
| Women's Singles 4th Round | (United States) Coco Gauff [4] | (United States) Iva Jovic [14] | 6–1, 6–4 |
| Men's Singles 4th Round | (Germany) Alexander Zverev [1] | (Italy) Luciano Darderi [21] | 6–2, 6–2, 7–6^{(7–3)} |
Matches on Louis Armstrong Stadium
| Event | Winner | Loser | Score |
| Women's Singles 4th Round | Mirra Andreeva [5] | (Austria) Anastasia Potapova [24] | 5–7, 6–4, 6–3 |
| Women's Doubles 3rd Round | (Czech Republic) Kateřina Siniaková [1] (United States) Taylor Townsend [1] | (Australia) Storm Hunter [13] (United States) Desirae Krawczyk [13] | 7–6^{(8–6)}, 6–4 |
| Women's Singles 4th Round | (Kazakhstan) Elena Rybakina [2] | (Japan) Naomi Osaka [13] | 6–1, 6–4 |
| Men's Singles 4th Round | Karen Khachanov | (United States) Learner Tien [14] | 7–5, 4–6, 6–7^{(6–8)}, 6–1, 6–4 |
Matches on Grandstand
| Event | Winner | Loser | Score |
| Men's Doubles 2nd Round | (Portugal) Francisco Cabral [16] (United States) JJ Tracy [16] | (United States) Nathaniel Lammons [WC] (United States) Jackson Withrow [WC] | 6–2, 6–7^{(3–7)}, 6–4 |
| Women's Doubles 3rd Round | (Canada) Gabriela Dabrowski [2] (Brazil) Luisa Stefani [2] | (Japan) Eri Hozumi (Slovenia) Andreja Klepač | 6–0, 6–3 |
| Men's Doubles 2nd Round | (United States) Christian Harrison [5] (United Kingdom) Neal Skupski [5] | (United Kingdom) Jan Choinski [Alt] (Bulgaria) Alexander Donski [Alt] | 7–6^{(7–1)}, 6–3 |
| Men's Singles 4th Round | (Netherlands) Botic van de Zandschulp | (France) Arthur Géa [LL] | 3–6, 6–7^{(0–7)}, 7–6^{(9–7)}, 7–6^{(7–3)}, 6–4 |
Matches on Stadium 17
| Event | Winner | Loser | Score |
| Girls' Singles 1st Round | (United States) Janae Preston [6] | (Netherlands) Fleur de Bresser | 6–1, 6–0 |
| Men's Doubles 2nd Round | (El Salvador) Marcelo Arévalo [3] (Croatia) Mate Pavić [3] | (United States) Mac Kiger [WC] (United States) Aleksandar Kovacevic [WC] | 6–7^{(6–8)}, 7–6^{(7–3)}, 7–6^{(10–7)} |
| Women's Doubles 3rd Round | (Spain) Cristina Bucșa [6] (United States) Nicole Melichar-Martinez [6] | (Estonia) Ingrid Neel (Mexico) Giuliana Olmos | 7–5, 6–3 |
| Boys' Doubles 1st Round | (United States) Tanishk Konduri (United States) Marcel Latak | (Australia) Daniel Jovanovski (Germany) Oliver Majdanzic | 6–4, 6–3 |
| Men's Doubles 2nd Round | (Spain) Marcel Granollers [2] (Argentina) Horacio Zeballos [2] | (United Kingdom) Arthur Fery (United Kingdom) Joshua Paris | walkover |
Colored background indicates a night match
Day matches began at 11am (11:30 am Arthur Ashe Stadium), night matches began at 7pm Eastern Daylight Time (EDT)

== Day 10 (September 8) ==
- Seeds out:
  - Men's Singles: (Spain) Carlos Alcaraz [2]
  - Women's Singles: (Czech Republic) Linda Nosková [6], (United States) Emma Navarro [26]
  - Men's Doubles: (United Kingdom) Julian Cash / (United Kingdom) Lloyd Glasspool [9], (Austria) Lucas Miedler / (Australia) Marc Polmans [13], (United States) Austin Krajicek / (Croatia) Nikola Mektić [15], (Portugal) Francisco Cabral / (United States) JJ Tracy [16]
  - Women's Doubles: (Chinese Taipei) Hsieh Su-wei / (Latvia) Jeļena Ostapenko [4], (Spain) Cristina Bucșa / (United States) Nicole Melichar-Martinez [6], (China) Jiang Xinyu / (China) Zhang Shuai [7], (New Zealand) Erin Routliffe / (Indonesia) Aldila Sutjiadi [9]
- Schedule of Play

Matches on main courts
Matches on Arthur Ashe Stadium
| Event | Winner | Loser | Score |
|---|---|---|---|
| Women's Singles Quarterfinals | Aryna Sabalenka [1] | (Czech Republic) Linda Nosková [6] | 7−6^{(7−1)}, 3−6, 7−6^{(10−7)} |
| Men's Singles Quarterfinals | (United States) Frances Tiafoe [11] | (United States) Alex Michelsen | 5–7, 3–6, 7–5, 6–3, 7–6^{(10–6)} |
| Women's Singles Quarterfinals | (United States) Jessica Pegula [3] | (United States) Emma Navarro [26] | 3–6, 6–4, 6–3 |
| Men's Singles Quarterfinals | (United States) Ben Shelton [8] | (Spain) Carlos Alcaraz [2] | 6–7^{(5–7)}, 6–1, 6–3, 1–6, 7–6^{(10–6)} |
Matches on Louis Armstrong Stadium
| Event | Winner | Loser | Score |
| Boys' Singles 2nd Round | (United States) Jack Kennedy [5] | (Canada) Benjamin Azar [Q] | 6−0, 6−4 |
| Boys' Singles 2nd Round | (United States) Jack Secord | (France) Yannick Theodor Alexandrescou [9] | 6−2, 6−4 |
| Women's Doubles Quarterfinals | (Czech Republic) Kateřina Siniaková [1] (United States) Taylor Townsend [1] | (Spain) Cristina Bucșa [6] (United States) Nicole Melichar-Martinez [6] | 6–4, 6–2 |
| Women's Doubles Quarterfinals | (Belgium) Elise Mertens [8] Diana Shnaider [8] | (Chinese Taipei) Hsieh Su-wei [4] (Latvia) Jeļena Ostapenko [4] | 7–5, 6–3 |
Matches on Grandstand
| Event | Winner | Loser | Score |
| Boys' Singles 2nd Round | (Germany) Jamie Mackenzie | (Japan) Kanta Watanabe | 6−2, 6−4 |
| Boys' Singles 2nd Round | (United States) Keaton Hance [4] | (Germany) Oliver Majdanzic | 7–5, 6–0 |
| Boys' Doubles 1st Round | (Japan) Hyu Kawanishi (Japan) Kanta Watanabe | (United States) Michael Antonius [3] (United States) Jordan Lee [3] | 6–3, 7–5 |
| Boys' Doubles 1st Round | (Canada) Benjamin Azar (Romania) Matei Victor Chelemen | (Colombia) Juan Miguel Bolívar Idárraga (United States) Andrew Johnson | 6–4, 6–3 |
| Girls' Doubles 1st Round | (China) Qu Yihan [7] (China) Shao Yushan [7] | (United States) Chukwumelije Clarke (United States) Ireland O'Brien | 6–4, 6–3 |
Matches on Stadium 17
| Event | Winner | Loser | Score |
| Girls' Singles 2nd Round | (Czech Republic) Jana Kovačková [2] | (United States) Hannah Ayrault [WC] | 6−3, 6−3 |
| Girls' Singles 2nd Round | (United States) Janae Preston [6] | (Canada) Avery Alexander | 4–6, 6–3, 6–2 |
| Girls' Doubles 1st Round | (Czech Republic) Jana Kovačková [5] (Czech Republic) Kateřina Zajíčková [5] | (United States) Jordyn Hazelitt (Latvia) Marija Lauva | 7–5, 6–4 |
| Women's Doubles Quarterfinals | (Canada) Gabriela Dabrowski [2] (Brazil) Luisa Stefani [2] | (China) Jiang Xinyu [7] (China) Zhang Shuai [7] | 6–3, 6–4 |
| Women's Doubles Quarterfinals | (United States) Ashlyn Krueger [WC] (United States) Robin Montgomery [WC] | (New Zealand) Erin Routliffe [9] (Indonesia) Aldila Sutjiadi [9] | 7−6^{(7−5)}, 6–3 |
Colored background indicates a night match
Day matches began at 11am (11:30 am Arthur Ashe Stadium), night matches began at 7pm Eastern Daylight Time (EDT)

== Day 11 (September 9) ==
- Seeds out:
  - Men's Singles: (Belgium) Alexander Blockx [28]
  - Women's Singles: Mirra Andreeva [5]
  - Men's Doubles: (Spain) Marcel Granollers / (Argentina) Horacio Zeballos [2], (El Salvador) Marcelo Arévalo / (Croatia) Mate Pavić [3], (Italy) Simone Bolelli / (Italy) Andrea Vavassori [4], (Argentina) Guido Andreozzi / (France) Manuel Guinard [7]
  - Women's Doubles: (Canada) Gabriela Dabrowski / (Brazil) Luisa Stefani [2], (Belgium) Elise Mertens / Diana Shnaider [8]
- Schedule of Play

Matches on main courts
Matches on Arthur Ashe Stadium
| Event | Winner | Loser | Score |
|---|---|---|---|
| Women's Singles Quarterfinals | (Kazakhstan) Elena Rybakina [2] | (China) Zheng Qinwen [Q] | 3–6, 6–1, 6–4 |
| Women's Singles Quarterfinals | (United States) Coco Gauff [4] | Mirra Andreeva [5] | 2–6, 7–6^{(9–7)}, 6–2 |
| Men's Singles Quarterfinals | Karen Khachanov | (Belgium) Alexander Blockx [28] | 6–2, 7–5, 3–2, retired |
| Men's Singles Quarterfinals | (Germany) Alexander Zverev [1] | (Netherlands) Botic van de Zandschulp | 6–2, 7–5, 6–1 |
| Men's Doubles Quarterfinals | (United States) Christian Harrison [5] (United Kingdom) Neal Skupski [5] | (Italy) Simone Bolelli [4] (Italy) Andrea Vavassori [4] | 6–3, 6–2 |
Matches on Louis Armstrong Stadium
| Event | Winner | Loser | Score |
| Boys' Singles 3rd Round | (United States) Marcel Latak [SE] | (Bulgaria) Dimitar Kisimov [10] | 6–3, 6–3 |
| Boys' Singles 3rd Round | (Italy) Simone Massellani | (United States) Tanishk Konduri | 7–6^{(7–1)}, 6–2 |
| Boys' Singles 3rd Round | (United States) Jack Kennedy [5] | (United States) Jack Secord | 6–0, 6–5 |
| Women's Doubles Semifinals | (Czech Republic) Kateřina Siniaková [1] (United States) Taylor Townsend [1] | (Belgium) Elise Mertens [8] Diana Shnaider [8] | 6–0, 7–6^{(10–8)} |
| Women's Doubles Semifinals | (United States) Ashlyn Krueger [WC] (United States) Robin Montgomery [WC] | (Canada) Gabriela Dabrowski [2] (Brazil) Luisa Stefani [2] | 4–6, 6–4, 7–6^{(10–8)} |
Matches on Grandstand
| Event | Winner | Loser | Score |
| Girls' Singles 3rd Round | Mariia Makarova [7] | (Argentina) Sol Ailin Larraya Guidi [12] | 6–0, 6–7^{(3–7)}, 6–4 |
| Girls' Singles 3rd Round | (United States) Chukwumelije Clarke | (China) Zhang Ruien | 6–3, 6–3 |
| Boys' Doubles 2nd Round | (United States) Vihaan Reddy (United States) Mason Vaughan | (Canada) Benjamin Azar (Romania) Matei Victor Chelemen | 6–4, 6–3 |
| Girls' Doubles 2nd Round | (United States) Annika Penickova [WC] (United States) Kristina Penickova [WC] | (Brazil) Victoria Luíza Barros [2] (Brazil) Nauhany Vitória Leme da Silva [2] | 6–0, 6–0 |
Matches on Stadium 17
| Event | Winner | Loser | Score |
| Girls' Singles 3rd Round | (Brazil) Nauhany Vitória Leme da Silva [8] | Felitsata Dorofeeva-Rybas [11] | 6–2, 6–4 |
| Girls' Singles 3rd Round | Anna Pushkareva [5] | (Spain) Paola Piñera Celori [10] | 6–1, 6–1 |
| Girls' Doubles 2nd Round | (Jamaica) Alyssa James [8] (Ukraine) Polina Skliar [8] | (United Kingdom) Daniella Britton (Bosnia and Herzegovina) Tea Kovačević | 6–1, 2–6, [10–4] |
| Boys' Doubles 2nd Round | (Puerto Rico) Yannik Álvarez (United States) Ryan Cozad | (Austria) Thilo Behrmann [5] (Israel) Dan Brand [5] | 6–2, 6–2 |
| Girls' Doubles 2nd Round | Polina Berezina; Alisa Terentyeva | (France) Ksenia Efremova [3] (Spain) Paola Piñera Celorio [3] | 3–6, 6–4, [10–6] |
Colored background indicates a night match
Day matches began at 11am (11:30 am Arthur Ashe Stadium), night matches began at 7:30 pm Eastern Daylight Time (EDT)

== Day 12 (September 10) ==
- Seeds out:
  - Women's Singles: (United States) Jessica Pegula [3], (United States) Coco Gauff [4]
  - Men's Doubles: (Finland) Harri Heliövaara / (United Kingdom) Henry Patten [1]
- Schedule of Play

Matches on main courts
Matches on Arthur Ashe Stadium
| Event | Winner | Loser | Score |
|---|---|---|---|
| Women's Singles Semifinals | Aryna Sabalenka [1] | (United States) Jessica Pegula [3] | 7–5, 6–2 |
| Women's Singles Semifinals | (Kazakhstan) Elena Rybakina [2] | (United States) Coco Gauff [4] | 3–6, 6–4, 6–4 |
Matches on Louis Armstrong Stadium
| Event | Winner | Loser | Score |
| Wheelchair Women's Singles Quarterfinals | (Japan) Yui Kamiji [1] | (Colombia) Angélica Bernal | 6–3, 6–2 |
| Boys' Singles Quarterfinals | (United States) Marcel Latak [SE] | (United States) Keaton Hance [4] | 6–4, 6–4 |
| Men's Doubles Semifinals | (Germany) Kevin Krawietz [6] (Germany) Tim Pütz [6] | (United States) Rajeev Ram (United Kingdom) Joe Salisbury | 6–3, 6–4 |
| Men's Doubles Semifinals | (United States) Christian Harrison [5] (United Kingdom) Neal Skupski [5] | (Finland) Harri Heliövaara [1] (United Kingdom) Henry Patten [1] | 7–6^{(7–4)}, 6–2 |
Matches on Stadium 17
| Event | Winner | Loser | Score |
| Girls' Singles Quarterfinals | (China) Sun Xinran [1] | Mariia Makarova [7] | 7–6^{(7–2)}, 6–1 |
| Girls' Singles Quarterfinals | Anna Pushkareva [5] | Ekaterina Dotsenko | 6–4, 6–0 |
| Girls' Doubles Quarterfinals | (United States) Annika Penickova [WC] (United States) Kristina Penickova [WC] | (Jamaica) Alyssa James [8] (Ukraine) Polina Skliar [8] | 6–4, 6–4 |
| Girls' Doubles Quarterfinals | (India) Maaya Rajeshwaran Revathi (Ukraine) Antonina Sushkova | Felitsata Dorofeeva-Rybas [4] Anna Pushkareva [4] | 6–4, 6–4 |
Colored background indicates a night match
Day matches began at 11am, night matches began at 7pm Eastern Daylight Time (EDT)

== Day 13 (September 11) ==
- Seeds out:
  - Men's Singles: (United States) Frances Tiafoe [11]
- Schedule of Play

Matches on main courts
Matches on Arthur Ashe Stadium
| Event | Winner | Loser | Score |
|---|---|---|---|
| Women's Doubles Final | (Czech Republic) Kateřina Siniaková [1] (United States) Taylor Townsend [1] | (United States) Ashlyn Krueger [WC] (United States) Robin Montgomery [WC] | 5–7, 6–0, 6–2 |
| Men's Singles Semifinals | (Germany) Alexander Zverev [1] | Karen Khachanov | 6–3, 7–6^{(9–7)}, 7–6^{(8–6)} |
| Men's Singles Semifinals | (United States) Ben Shelton [8] | (United States) Frances Tiafoe [11] | 4–6, 6–3, 6–3, 7–5 |
Colored background indicates a night match
Day matches began at 12pm, night match began at 7pm Eastern Daylight Time (EDT)

== Day 14 (September 12) ==
- Seeds out:
  - Women's Singles: Aryna Sabalenka [1]
  - Men's Doubles: (Germany) Kevin Krawietz / (Germany) Tim Pütz [6]
- Schedule of Play

Matches on main courts
Matches on Arthur Ashe Stadium
| Event | Winner | Loser | Score |
|---|---|---|---|
| Men's Doubles Final | (United States) Christian Harrison [5] (United Kingdom) Neal Skupski [5] | (Germany) Kevin Krawietz [6] (Germany) Tim Pütz [6] | 6–4, 7–6^{(8–6)} |
| Women's Singles Final | (Kazakhstan) Elena Rybakina [2] | Aryna Sabalenka [1] | 6–4, 5–7, 6–2 |
Matches began at 11am (12 pm Arthur Ashe Stadium) Eastern Daylight Time (EDT)

== Day 15 (September 13) ==
- Seeds out:
  - Men's Singles: (United States) Ben Shelton [8]
- Schedule of Play

Matches on main courts
Matches on Arthur Ashe Stadium
| Event | Winner | Loser | Score |
|---|---|---|---|
| Men's Singles Final | (Germany) Alexander Zverev [1] | (United States) Ben Shelton [8] | 6–3, 7–6^{(7–2)}, 5–7, 6–2 |
Match began at 2pm Eastern Daylight Time (EDT)
