= 2022 NCAA Division I Men's Tennis Championships =

- Date: May 6–28, 2022
- Edition: 76th
- Location: First, second, third rounds: Campus sites Remainder: Champaign, Illinois
- Venue: Khan Outdoor Tennis Complex; Hosted by: University of Illinois Urbana-Champaign

Champions

Men's singles
- Ben Shelton (Florida)

Men's doubles
- Cleeve Harper and Richard Ciamarra (Texas)

Men's team
- Virginia
- NCAA Division I Men's Tennis Championships

The 2022 NCAA Division I Men's Tennis Championships were the men's tennis tournaments played from May 6 to May 28, 2022 at campus sites and Champaign, Illinois at the Khan Outdoor Tennis Complex. It was the 76th edition of the NCAA Division I Men's Tennis Championship.

== Men's team championship ==
There were 64 teams selected to the men's team championship, 30 of which were automatic qualifiers from each Division I conference. The remaining 34 teams were selected at-large. Teams played two rounds of single-elimination matches in groups of four from May 6–7 at campus sites; the winners of those regionals advanced to a super-regional round, also held at campus sites. The remaining eight teams advanced to the championship rounds in Champaign, Illinois.

=== Automatic qualifiers ===
The following 30 teams were automatic qualifiers, representing their conferences:

Conference	Team
ACC	Virginia
American	SMU
ASUN	Liberty
Atlantic 10	VCU
Big East	DePaul
Big Sky	Idaho
Big South	Radford
Big Ten	Michigan
Big 12	Baylor
Big West	UC Irvine
CAA	UNC Wilmington
Conference USA	Middle Tennessee
Horizon	Youngstown State
Ivy	Harvard
MAAC	Monmouth
MAC	Western Michigan
MEAC	South Carolina State
Mountain West	Nevada
Northeast	Fairleigh Dickinson
Ohio Valley	Tennessee Tech
Pac-12	USC
Patriot	Navy
SEC	Florida
Southern	East Tennessee State
Southland	New Orleans
Summit	Drake
Sun Belt	Georgia State
SWAC	Alabama State
WAC	Abilene Christian
West Coast	San Diego

=== National seeds ===
Sixteen teams were selected as national seeds, and were guaranteed to host for the first two rounds, if they submitted a bid and met criteria. Of these 16 teams, only Middle Tennessee did not host during the first weekend.

1. TCU (quarterfinals)
2. Florida (quarterfinals)
3. Baylor (quarterfinals)
4. Ohio State (semifinals)
5. Michigan (quarterfinals)
6. Tennessee (semifinals)
7. Virginia (National Champions)
8. Kentucky (runner-up)
9. Wake Forest (Super Regionals)
10. South Carolina (Super Regionals)
11. Georgia (second round)
12. Texas (Super Regionals)
13. USC (Super Regionals)
14. Harvard (second round)
15. North Carolina (Super Regionals)
16. Middle Tennessee (second round)

=== Bracket ===
Bold indicates winner. Host institutions for the first two rounds and Super Regionals are marked with an asterisk (*).

**First Round**; May 6, 2022; Campus sites
1	**TCU***	**4**
Drake	0
Fort Worth, Texas
**Utah**	**4**
Ole Miss	2
**NC State***	**4**
Liberty	0
Raleigh, North Carolina
UNC Wilmington	0
16	**Middle Tennessee**	**4**
9	**Wake Forest***	**4**
Radford	0
Winston-Salem, North Carolina
Texas Tech	1
**Auburn**	**4**
**Northwestern**	**4**
East Tennessee State	0
Lexington, Kentucky
DePaul	0
8	**Kentucky***	**4**
5	**Michigan***	**4**
Western Michigan	0
Ann Arbor, Michigan
**Oklahoma**	**4**
Louisville	2
SMU	3
**LSU**	**4**
Austin, Texas
Idaho	0
12	**Texas***	**4**
13	**USC***	**4**
Nevada	0
Los Angeles, California
UC Irvine	0
**San Diego**	**4**
**Columbia**	**4**
Notre Dame	2
Columbus, Ohio
Youngstown State	0
4	**Ohio State***	**4**
3	**Baylor***	**4**
Abilene Christian	0
Waco, Texas
Tulsa	1
**Texas A&M**	**4**
**Stanford**	**4**
Mississippi State	0
Cambridge, Massachusetts
Monmouth	0
14	**Harvard***	**4**
11	**Georgia***	**4**
Alabama State	0
Athens, Georgia
Georgia State	1
**Florida State**	**4**
**Duke**	**4**
Memphis	1
Knoxville, Tennessee
Tennessee Tech	0
6	**Tennessee***	**4**
7	**Virginia***	**4**
Fairleigh Dickinson	0
Charlottesville, Virginia
Penn	3
**VCU**	**4**
**Pepperdine**	**4**
Washington	0
Columbia, South Carolina
South Carolina State	0
10	**South Carolina***	**4**
15	**North Carolina***	**4**
Navy	1
Chapel Hill, North Carolina
Princeton	2
**Arizona**	**4**
**Miami (FL)**	**4**
South Florida	3
Gainesville, Florida
New Orleans	0
2	**Florida***	**4**

**Second Round**; May 7, 2022; Campus sites
1	**TCU**	**4**
Utah	0
**NC State**	**4**
16	Middle Tennessee	3
9	**Wake Forest**	**4**
Auburn	1
Northwestern	2
8	**Kentucky**	**4**
5	**Michigan**	**4**
Oklahoma	0
LSU	0
12	**Texas**	**4**
13	**USC**	**4**
San Diego	1
Columbia	0
4	**Ohio State**	**4**
3	**Baylor**	**4**
Texas A&M	2
**Stanford**	**4**
14	Harvard	3
11	Georgia	3
**Florida State**	**4**
Duke	1
6	**Tennessee**	**4**
7	**Virginia**	**4**
VCU	0
Pepperdine	1
10	**South Carolina**	**4**
15	**North Carolina**	**4**
Arizona	1
Miami (FL)	0
2	**Florida**	**4**

**Super Regionals**; May 13 or 14, 2022; Campus sites
1	**TCU***	**4**
NC State	0
9	Wake Forest	2
8	**Kentucky***	**4**
5	**Michigan***	**4**
12	Texas	2
13	USC	2
4	**Ohio State***	**4**
3	**Baylor***	**4**
Stanford	3
Florida State	0
6	**Tennessee***	**4**
7	**Virginia***	**4**
10	South Carolina	0
15	North Carolina	0
2	**Florida***	**4**

**Quarterfinals**; May 19, 2022; Champaign, IL
1	TCU	3
8	**Kentucky**	**4**
5	Michigan	2
4	**Ohio State**	**4**
3	Baylor	3
6	**Tennessee**	**4**
7	**Virginia**	**4**
2	Florida	1

**Semifinals**; May 21, 2022; Champaign, IL
8	**Kentucky**	**4**
4	Ohio State	1
6	Tennessee	0
7	**Virginia**	**5**

**Championship**; May 22, 2022; Champaign, IL
8	Kentucky	0
7	**Virginia**	**4**

Bracket source:

== Men's singles championship ==
There were 64 singles players selected to the men's singles championship, 15 of which were automatic qualifiers from each Division I conference with an eligible player ranked in the ITA Top 125. The remaining 49 players were selected at-large. The tournament was played following the team championship from May 23–28 in Champaign, Illinois.

=== Automatic qualifiers ===
The following 15 players were automatic qualifiers, representing their conferences:

Conference	Player	Team
ACC	Chris Rodesch	Virginia
American	Kody Pearson	Tulsa
ASUN	Dominik Barton	North Florida
Atlantic 10	Charles Bertimon	VCU
Big East	Diego Nava	Xavier
Big Ten	Cannon Kingsley	Ohio State
Big 12	Adrian Boitan	Baylor
Big West	Andre Ilagan	Hawaii
Conference USA	Francois Le Tallec	Old Dominion
Ivy	Alex Kotzen	Columbia
Mountain West	Christopher Bolus	UNLV
Pac-12	Stefan Dostanic	USC
SEC	Ben Shelton	Florida
Summit	James Davis	Denver
West Coast	August Holmgren	San Diego

=== National seeds ===
The following sixteen players were seeded for this tournament:

1. Ben Shelton (Florida) (National Champion)
2. Daniel Rodrigues (South Carolina)
3. Adam Walton (Tennessee)
4. Liam Draxl (Kentucky)
5. Adrian Boitan (Baylor)
6. August Holmgren (San Diego)
7. Stefan Dostanic (USC)
8. Cannon Kingsley (Ohio State)

Players ranked 9th–16th, listed by last name

- Juan Carlos Aguilar (TCU)
- Clément Chidekh (Washington)
- Johannus Monday (Tennessee)
- Arthur Fery (Stanford)
- Luc Fomba (TCU)
- Nikola Slavic (Ole Miss)
- Hamish Stewart (Georgia)
- Matěj Vocel (Ohio State)

=== Draw ===
Bracket:

==== Finals ====
Quarterfinals
1	Ben Shelton (Florida)	6	6
9-16	Arthur Fery (Stanford)	3	4
3	Adam Walton (Tennessee)	4	6	7^{7}
Gabriel Diallo (Kentucky)	6	4	6^{3}
6	August Holmgren (San Diego)	6	6^{6}	6
Eduardo Nava (Wake Forest)	4	7^{8}	0
Sam Riffice (Florida)	6	7^{7}
Iñaki Montes de la Torre (Virginia)	3	6^{5}

Semifinals
1	Ben Shelton (Florida)	6^{3}	6	7
3	Adam Walton (Tennessee)	7^{7}	3	5
6	August Holmgren (San Diego)	6^{3}	6	6
Sam Riffice (Florida)	7^{7}	4	2

Final
1	Ben Shelton (Florida)	4	6	6
6	August Holmgren (San Diego)	6	3	2

==== Section 1 ====
First round
1	Ben Shelton (Florida)	7	6
Ondřej Štyler (Michigan)	5	2
Edoardo Graziani (Penn)	5	6^{5}
Axel Nefve (Notre Dame)	7	7
9-16	Nikola Slavic (Ole Miss)	6^{4}	6^{6}
Filippo Moroni (Wake Forest)	7^{7}	7^{7}
JJ Tracy (Ohio State)	6	6
Dominik Barton (North Florida)	2	1
7	Stefan Dostanic (USC)	4	6	6
Florian Broska (Mississippi State)	6	3	2
Philip Henning (Georgia)	7^{7}	6
James Davis (Denver)	6^{4}	4
9-16	Arthur Fery (Stanford)	6	6
Francois Le Tallec (Old Dominion)	4	2
Andres Martin (Georgia Tech)	7^{7}	6
Daniel De Jong (Pepperdine)	6^{5}	4

Second round
1	B Shelton (Florida)	6	7^{7}
A Nefve (Notre Dame)	0	6^{1}
F Moroni (Wake Forest)	1	3
JJ Tracy (Ohio State)	6	6
7	S Dostanic (USC)	7	6
P Henning (Georgia)	5	3
9-16	A Fery (Stanford)	6	2	6
A Martin (Georgia Tech)	3	6	3

Third round
1	B Shelton (Florida)	6	6
JJ Tracy (Ohio State)	4	4
7	S Dostanic (USC)	2	3
9-16	A Fery (Stanford)	6	6

Quarterfinals
1	B Shelton (Florida)	6	6
9-16	A Fery (Stanford)	3	4

==== Section 2 ====
First round
3	Adam Walton (Tennessee)	6	6
Charles Bertimon (VCU)	4	0
Steven Forman (Northwestern)	7^{10}	7
Tyler Stice (Auburn)	6^{8}	5
9-16	Luc Fomba (TCU)	6	6
Gustaf Strom (Arizona)	2	4
Henry von der Schulenburg (Harvard)	6	6
Olivier Stuart (Illinois)	1	3
5	Adrian Boitan (Baylor)	2	3
Gabriel Diallo (Kentucky)	6	6
Chris Rodesch (Virginia)	6	6
George Harwell (Vanderbilt)	3	4
9-16	Matěj Vocel (Ohio State)	6^{4}	6	6
Murphy Cassone (Arizona State)	7^{7}	4	3
Andre Ilagan (Hawaii)	3	7^{7}	2
Filip Planinsek (Alabama)	6	6^{2}	6

Second round
3	A Walton (Tennessee)	6	6
S Forman (Northwestern)	3	2
9-16	L Fomba (TCU)	4	6^{5}
H von der Schulenburg (Harvard)	6	7^{7}
G Diallo (Kentucky)	6	4	6
C Rodesch (Virginia)	2	6	4
9-16	M Vocel (Ohio State)	6	6
F Planinsek (Alabama)	2	3

Third round
3	A Walton (Tennessee)	7^{7}	6
H von der Schulenburg (Harvard)	6^{1}	3
G Diallo (Kentucky)	6	4	7
9-16	M Vocel (Ohio State)	4	6	5

Quarterfinals
3	A Walton (Tennessee)	4	6	7^{7}
G Diallo (Kentucky)	6	4	6^{3}

==== Section 3 ====
First round
Brian Cernoch (North Carolina)	6	6
Alexander Hoogmartens (UCLA)	1	1
Jeffrey von der Schulenburg (Virginia)	7	6
9-16	Clément Chidekh (Washington)	5	3
Christopher Bulus (UNLV)	6	1	4
Jonas Eriksson Ziverts (Arizona)	2	6	6
Noah Schachter (Texas A&M)	0	2
6	August Holmgren (San Diego)	6	6
Tadeas Paroulek (Baylor)	6	6
James Trotter (Ohio State)	4	4
Loris Pourroy (Florida State)	2	6	5
9-16	Hamish Stewart (Georgia)	6	4	7
Alexandre Reco (Arkansas)	6	7^{7}
Diego Nava (Xavier)	4	6^{3}
Eduardo Nava (Wake Forest)	4	2
4	Liam Draxl (Kentucky)	6	1^{ret.}

Second round
B Cernoch (North Carolina)	7^{7}	6
J von der Schulenburg (Virginia)	6^{4}	1
J E Ziverts (Arizona)	1	4
6	A Holmgren (San Diego)	6	6
T Paroulek (Baylor)	7^{7}	2	4
9-16	H Stewart (Georgia)	6^{4}	6	6
A Reco (Arkansas)	7^{7}	4	3
E Nava (Wake Forest)	6^{3}	6	6

Third round
B Cernoch (North Carolina)	2	4
6	A Holmgren (San Diego)	6	6
9-16	H Stewart (Georgia)	4	6	6^{5}
E Nava (Wake Forest)	6	4	7^{7}

Quarterfinals
6	A Holmgren (San Diego)	6	6^{6}	6
E Nava (Wake Forest)	4	7^{8}	0

==== Section 4 ====
First round
Ronnie Hohmann (LSU)	6	6
Matías Soto (Baylor)	2	4
Alex Kotzen (Columbia)	3	6^{4}
9-16	Juan Carlos Aguilar (TCU)	6	7^{7}
Garrett Johns (Duke)	6	6
Ryan Seggerman (Princeton)	2	2
Sam Riffice (Florida)	7	6
8	Cannon Kingsley (Ohio State)	5	2
Peter Makk (USC Trojans)	1	3
Iñaki Montes de la Torre (Virginia)	6	6
Alafia Ayeni (Cornell)	5	6	2
9-16	Johannus Monday (Tennessee)	7	4	6
Harris Walker (Harvard)	6	6
Kody Pearson (Tulsa)	3	2
Mason Beiler (Oklahoma)	3	3
2	Daniel Rodrigues (South Carolina)	6	6

Second round
R Hohmann (LSU)	5	6	6
9-16	JC Aguilar (TCU)	7	4	2
G Johns (Duke)	5	6	5
S Riffice (Florida)	7	4	7
I Montes de la Torre (Virginia)	6	6
9-16	J Monday (Tennessee)	2	1
H Walker (Harvard)	5	6	3
2	D Rodrigues (South Carolina)	7	4	6

Third round
R Hohmann (LSU)	4	3
S Riffice (Florida)	6	6
I Montes de la Torre (Virginia)	3	6	6
2	D Rodrigues (South Carolina)	6	2	2

Quarterfinals
S Riffice (Florida)	6	7^{7}
I Montes de la Torre (Virginia)	3	6^{5}

== Men's doubles championship ==
There were 32 doubles teams selected to the men's doubles championship, 11 of whom were automatic qualifiers from each Division I conference with an eligible player ranked in the ITA Top 60. The remaining 21 teams were selected at-large. The tournament was played following the team championship from May 23–28 in Champaign, Illinois.

=== Automatic qualifiers ===
The following 11 teams were automatic qualifiers, representing their conferences:

Conference	Player	Team
ACC	Chris Rodesch	Virginia
ACC	Ryan Goetz	Virginia
American	David Stevenson	Memphis
American	Jeremy Taylor	Memphis
Atlantic 10	Charles Bertimon	VCU
Atlantic 10	Maxence Bertimon	VCU
Big Sky	Jamieson Nathan	Montana State
Big Sky	Matej Panik	Montana State
Big 12	Jacob Fearnley	TCU
Big 12	Luc Fomba	TCU
Big Ten	Matej Vocel	Ohio State
Big Ten	Robert Cash	Ohio State
Conference USA	Francisco Rocha	Middle Tennessee
Conference USA	Oskar Brostrøm Poulsen	Middle Tennessee
Ivy	Alafia Ayeni	Cornell
Ivy	Vladislav Melnic	Cornell
Pac-12	Bradley Frye	USC
Pac-12	Stefan Dostanic	USC
SEC	Ben Shelton	Florida
SEC	Sam Riffice	Florida
West Coast	August Holmgren	San Diego
West Coast	Guilherme Osorio	San Diego

=== National seeds ===
The following eight teams were seeded for this tournament:

1. Jacob Fearnley / Luc Fomba (TCU)
2. Matěj Vocel / Robert Cash (Ohio State)
3. Finn Bass / Sven Lah (Baylor)
4. Cleeve Harper / Richard Ciamarra (Texas) (National Champions)

Players ranked 5th–8th, listed by institution

- Finlay Murgett / Tad McClean (Auburn)
- Ben Shelton / Sam Riffice (Florida)
- Eliot Spizzirri / Siem Woldeab (Texas)
- Bradley Frye / Stefan Dostanic (USC)

=== Draw ===
Bracket:

==== Finals ====
Semifinals
Charles Bertimon (VCU); Maxence Bertimon (VCU)	4	3
4	Cleeve Harper (Texas); Richard Ciamarra (Texas)	6	6
Connor Thomson (South Carolina); Daniel Rodrigues (South Carolina)	6	5	[8]
2	Matěj Vocel (Ohio State); Robert Cash (Ohio State)	4	7	[10]

Final
4	Cleeve Harper (Texas); Richard Ciamarra (Texas)	5	6	[10]
2	Matěj Vocel (Ohio State); Robert Cash (Ohio State)	7	4	[7]

==== Top half ====
First round
1	Jacob Fearnley (TCU); Luc Fomba (TCU)	3	7	[7]
Charles Bertimon (VCU); Maxence Bertimon (VCU)	6	6	[10]
Carl Emil Overbeck (California); Yuta Kikuchi (California)	4	7^{8}	[10]
Francisco Rocha (Middle Tennessee); Oskar Brostrøm Poulsen (Middle Tennessee)	6	6^{6}	[8]
5-8	Finlay Murgett (Auburn); Tad McClean (Auburn)	7^{7}	7
Brian Cernoch (North Carolina); Mac Kiger (North Carolina)	6^{5}	5
Jamieson Nathan (Montana State); Matej Panik (Montana State)	4	6	[10]
Chris Rodesch (Virginia); Ryan Goetz (Virginia)	6	1	[8]
4	Cleeve Harper (Texas); Richard Ciamarra (Texas)	6	6
Philip Henning (Georgia); Trent Bryde (Georgia)	4	3
Justin Barki (Princeton); Ryan Seggerman (Princeton)	6	1	[10]
Andres Martin (Georgia Tech); Marcus McDaniel (Georgia Tech)	2	6	[7]
5-8	Ben Shelton (Florida); Sam Riffice (Florida)	6	6
Juan Pablo Grassi Mazzuchi (Baylor); Matías Soto (Baylor)	4	3
Justin Boulais (Ohio State); James Trotter (Ohio State)	7	2	[10]
Emile Hudd (Tennessee); Shunsuke Mitsui (Tennessee)	5	6	[7]

Second round
C Bertimon (VCU); M Bertimon (VCU)	7^{7}	6
CE Overbeck (California); Y Kikuchi (California)	6^{5}	4
5-8	F Murgett (Auburn); T McClean (Auburn)	6	6
J Nathan (Montana State); M Panik (Montana State)	1	3
4	C Harper (Texas); R Ciamarra (Texas)	6	6
J Barki (Princeton); R Seggerman (Princeton)	3	4
5-8	B Shelton (Florida); S Riffice (Florida)	6	3	[10]
J Boulais (Ohio State); J Trotter (Ohio State)	2	6	[6]

Quarterfinals
C Bertimon (VCU); M Bertimon (VCU)	7	4	[10]
5-8	F Murgett (Auburn); T McClean (Auburn)	5	6	[6]
4	C Harper (Texas); R Ciamarra (Texas)	7	6
5-8	B Shelton (Florida); S Riffice (Florida)	5	2

Semifinals
C Bertimon (VCU); M Bertimon (VCU)	4	3
4	C Harper (Texas); R Ciamarra (Texas)	6	6

==== Bottom half ====
First round
Kenner Taylor (Texas A&M); Noah Schachter (Texas A&M)	6	4	[6]
Arthur Fery (Stanford); Alexandre Rotsaert (Stanford)	3	6	[10]
Connor Thomson (South Carolina); Daniel Rodrigues (South Carolina)	6	6
5-8	Eliot Spizzirri (Texas); Siem Woldeab (Texas)	2	2
David Stevenson (Memphis); Jeremy Taylor (Memphis)	6^{5}	4
Alafia Ayeni (Cornell); Vladislav Melnic (Cornell)	7^{7}	6
Jordan Chrysostom (Virginia Tech); Ryan Fishback (Virginia Tech)	3	4
3	Finn Bass (Baylor); Sven Lah (Baylor)	6	6
Andrew Fenty (Michigan); Nino Ehrenschneider (Michigan)	6	6
Joshua Charlton (Oregon); Quinn Vandecasteele (Oregon)	3	2
Jakob Schnaitter (Wake Forest); Siddhant Banthia (Wake Forest)	3	7^{9}	[10]
5-8	Bradley Frye (USC); Stefan Dostanic (USC)	6	6^{7}	[5]
August Holmgren (San Diego); Guilherme Osorio (San Diego)	3	2
Adam Walton (Tennessee); Patrick Harper (Tennessee)	6	6
Finn Reynolds (Ole Miss); Lukas Engelhardt (Ole Miss)	6	6^{5}	[8]
2	Matěj Vocel (Ohio State); Robert Cash (Ohio State)	4	7^{7}	[10]

Second round
A Fery (Stanford); A Rotsaert (Stanford)	2	6^{5}
C Thomson (South Carolina); D Rodrigues (South Carolina)	6	7^{7}
A Ayeni (Cornell); V Melnic (Cornell)	2	4
3	F Bass (Baylor); S Lah (Baylor)	6	6
A Fenty (Michigan); N Ehrenschneider (Michigan)	1	4
J Schnaitter (Wake Forest); S Banthia (Wake Forest)	6	6
A Walton (Tennessee); P Harper (Tennessee)	4	2
2	M Vocel (Ohio State); R Cash (Ohio State)	6	6

Quarterfinals
C Thomson (South Carolina); D Rodrigues (South Carolina)	7^{7}	6
3	F Bass (Baylor); S Lah (Baylor)	6^{2}	4
J Schnaitter (Wake Forest); S Banthia (Wake Forest)	4	6	[7]
2	M Vocel (Ohio State); R Cash (Ohio State)	6	4	[10]

Semifinals
C Thomson (South Carolina); D Rodrigues (South Carolina)	6	5	[8]
2	M Vocel (Ohio State); R Cash (Ohio State)	4	7	[10]
