= 2026 Columbus Challenger – Singles =

Singles
- 2026 Columbus Challenger

Final
- Champion: (Switzerland) Dylan Dietrich
- Runner-up: (Jordan) Abdullah Shelbayh
- Score: 6–3, 6–2

Events
Singles	Doubles
- Columbus Challenger

Michael Zheng was the defending champion but chose not to defend his title.

Dylan Dietrich won the title after defeating Abdullah Shelbayh 6–3, 6–2 in the final.

== Seeds ==
1. (United States) Darwin Blanch (quarterfinals)
2. (United States) Keegan Smith (quarterfinals)
3. (United States) Braden Shick (second round)
4. (United States) Colton Smith (second round)
5. (Ecuador) Andy Andrade (semifinals, retired)
6. (United States) J. J. Wolf (first round)
7. (Jordan) Abdullah Shelbayh (final)
8. (United States) Stefan Kozlov (second round)

== Draw ==
Key

- Q = Qualifier
- WC = Wild card
- LL = Lucky loser
- Alt = Alternate
- ITF = ITF entry
- PR = Protected ranking
- SR = Special ranking
- SE = Special exempt
- JE = Junior exempt
- JR = Junior Accelerator Programme entrant
- CO = College Accelerator Programme entrant
- NG = Next Gen Accelerator Program entrant
- w/o = Walkover
- r = Retired
- d = Defaulted

=== Finals ===
Semifinals
(Switzerland) Dylan Dietrich	6	1
5	(Ecuador) Andy Andrade	3	0^{r}
7	(Jordan) Abdullah Shelbayh	6	6
(United States) Mitchell Krueger	2	2

Final
(Switzerland) Dylan Dietrich	6	6
7	(Jordan) Abdullah Shelbayh	3	2

=== Top half ===
First round
1	(United States) Dar Blanch	6	7
PR	(United States) Patrick Maloney	4	5
(United States) D Milavsky	6	6
(Jamaica) B Bicknell	3	2
(Brazil) I Marcondes	2	4
(United States) A Fenty	6	6
(Switzerland) D Dietrich	7^{8}	6
6	(United States) JJ Wolf	6^{6}	3
3	(United States) B Shick	7^{7}	0	6
(United States) O Baris	6^{4}	6	3
(Netherlands) M Röttgering	7	6
(Australia) E Winter	5	3
Q	(United Kingdom) Oliver Okonkwo	7^{7}	4	1
Q	(Switzerland) Luca Stäheli	6^{1}	6	6
(United States) T Svajda	4	2
5	(Ecuador) A Andrade	6	6

Second round
1	(United States) Dar Blanch	6	1	6
(United States) D Milavsky	3	6	3
(United States) A Fenty	5	2
(Switzerland) D Dietrich	7	6
3	(United States) B Shick	1	4
(Netherlands) M Röttgering	6	6
Q	(Switzerland) L Stäheli	3	6^{7}
5	(Ecuador) A Andrade	6	7^{9}

Quarterfinals
1	(United States) Dar Blanch	3	3
(Switzerland) D Dietrich	6	6
(Netherlands) M Röttgering	3	6^{5}
5	(Ecuador) A Andrade	6	7^{7}

Semifinals
(Switzerland) D Dietrich	6	1
5	(Ecuador) A Andrade	3	0^{r}

=== Bottom half ===
First round
7	(Jordan) A Shelbayh	3	6	6
Q	(Australia) L Tu	6	2	3
(France) Raphael Perot	6	3	4
Q	D Ostapenkov	1	6	6
WC	(United States) NS Filin	4	4
(United States) A Mayo	6	6
Q	(Canada) D Chan	2	4
4	(United States) C Smith	6	6
8	(United States) S Kozlov	6	6
LL	(Japan) J Trotter	3	2
(United States) T Zink	6^{4}	3
(United States) M Krueger	7^{7}	6
WC	(United States) Bry Nakashima	4	6	7^{10}
(United States) J Kennedy	6	2	6^{8}
Q	(United States) K Bigun	6	6^{3}	2
2	(United States) K Smith	4	7^{7}	6

Second round
7	(Jordan) A Shelbayh	6	7
Q	D Ostapenkov	1	5
(United States) A Mayo	6	7^{10}
4	(United States) C Smith	2	6^{8}
8	(United States) S Kozlov	2	6	3
(United States) M Krueger	6	3	6
WC	(United States) Bry Nakashima	4	6	5
2	(United States) K Smith	6	3	7

Quarterfinals
7	(Jordan) A Shelbayh	7^{9}	7
(United States) A Mayo	6^{7}	5
(United States) M Krueger	6	7^{7}
2	(United States) K Smith	4	6^{4}

Semifinals
7	(Jordan) A Shelbayh	6	6
(United States) M Krueger	2	2
