= Richard Ciamarra =

American tennis player

- Country (sports): United States
- Born: November 13, 1998 (age 27) Pelham, New York, United States
- Height: 1.80 m (5 ft 11 in)
- Plays: Right-handed (two-handed backhand)

Singles
- Career record: 0–0 (at ATP Tour level, Grand Slam level, and in Davis Cup)
- Career titles: 0

Doubles
- Career record: 0–1 (at ATP Tour level, Grand Slam level, and in Davis Cup)
- Career titles: 0

Grand Slam mixed doubles results
- US Open: 1R (2022)
- Last updated on: July 13, 2022.

Richard Ciamarra (born November 13, 1998) is an American tennis player.

Ciamarra made his ATP main draw debut at the 2022 Hall of Fame Open after receiving a wildcard into the doubles main draw. He received this wildcard by winning the 2022 NCAA doubles title with Cleeve Harper.

Ciamarra played college tennis at University of Notre Dame before transferring to the University of Texas at Austin.
