= 2026 Columbus Challenger =

- Date: September 28 – October 4
- Edition: 16th
- Surface: Hard (indoor)
- Location: Columbus, United States
- Venue: Ohio State Varsity Tennis Center

Champions

Singles
- (Switzerland) Dylan Dietrich

Doubles
- (United States) Brandon Carpico / (United States) Nikita Samuel Filin
- Columbus Challenger

The 2026 Columbus Challenger was a professional tennis tournament played on indoor hard courts. It was the 16th edition of the men's tournament which was part of the 2026 ATP Challenger Tour. It took place in Columbus, United States between September 28 and October 4, 2026.

== Singles main draw entrants ==
=== Seeds ===
Country	Player	Rank^{1}	Seed
USA	Darwin Blanch	166	1
USA	Keegan Smith	194	2
USA	Braden Shick	202	3
USA	Colton Smith	205	4
ECU	Andy Andrade	206	5
USA	J. J. Wolf	218	6
JOR	Abdullah Shelbayh	250	7
USA	Stefan Kozlov	292	8

- ^{1} Rankings are as of September 21, 2026.

=== Other entrants ===
The following players received entry into the singles main draw as wildcards:

- (United States) Nikita Samuel Filin
- (United States) ~~Aidan Kim~~
- (United States) Bryce Nakashima

The following player received entry into the singles main draw using a protected ranking:

- (United States) Patrick Maloney

The following players received entry from the qualifying draw:

- (United States) Kaylan Bigun
- (Canada) Duncan Chan
- (United Kingdom) Oliver Okonkwo
- Daniil Ostapenkov
- (Switzerland) Luca Stäheli
- (Australia) Li Tu

The following player received entry as a lucky loser:

- (Japan) James Trotter

== Champions ==
=== Singles ===
- (Switzerland) Dylan Dietrich def. (Jordan) Abdullah Shelbayh 6–3, 6–2.

=== Doubles ===
- (United States) Brandon Carpico / (United States) Nikita Samuel Filin def. (United States) Daniel Milavsky / (United States) Braden Shick 7–6^{(7–3)}, 2–6, [10–4].
