= 2026 Columbus Challenger – Doubles =

Doubles
- 2026 Columbus Challenger

Final
- Champions: (United States) Brandon Carpico (United States) Nikita Samuel Filin
- Runners-up: (United States) Daniel Milavsky (United States) Braden Shick
- Score: 7–6^{(7–3)}, 2–6, [10–4]

Events
Singles	Doubles
- Columbus Challenger

Patrick Harper and Johannus Monday were the defending champions but chose not to defend their title.

Brandon Carpico and Nikita Samuel Filin won the title after defeating Daniel Milavsky and Braden Shick 7–6^{(7–3)}, 2–6, [10–4] in the final.

== Seeds ==
1. (United States) Daniel Milavsky / (United States) Braden Shick (final)
2. (United States) Alafia Ayeni / (United States) Billy Suarez (quarterfinals)
3. (Brazil) Luís Britto / (Brazil) Igor Marcondes (first round)
4. (Venezuela) Luis David Martínez / (Japan) James Trotter (quarterfinals)

== Draw ==
Key

- Q = Qualifier
- WC = Wild card
- LL = Lucky loser
- Alt = Alternate
- ITF = ITF entry
- PR = Protected ranking
- SR = Special ranking
- SE = Special exempt
- JE = Junior exempt
- JR = Junior Accelerator Programme entrant
- CO = College Accelerator Programme entrant
- NG = Next Gen Accelerator Program entrant
- w/o = Walkover
- r = Retired
- d = Defaulted

First round
1	(United States) D Milavsky (United States) B Shick	7	6
Alt	(United States) Michael Blando (United States) Kyle Overmyer	5	1
WC	(United States) M Forbes (Czech Republic) Denis Peták	2	6	[10]
(United States) A Mayo (United States) Jack Vance	6	3	[8]
3	(Brazil) L Britto (Brazil) I Marcondes	4	6^{6}
(United Kingdom) J MacKinlay (United Kingdom) Oliver Okonkwo	6	7^{8}
(United States) A Rybakov (United States) K Smith	6	5	[10]
Alt	(United States) B Batistone (United States) S Kozlov	3	7	[5]
(United States) B Carpico (United States) NS Filin	w/o
(Japan) S Mitsui (Australia) L Tu
(United States) Jayson Blando (United States) Oren Vasser	5	2
4	(Venezuela) LD Martínez (Japan) J Trotter	7	6
WC	(United Kingdom) Alexander Okonkwo (United States) Preston Stearns	7	7
(United States) Reid Jarvis (United States) Jamie Vance	5	5
(United States) A Fenty (United States) Patrick Maloney	1	3
2	(United States) A Ayeni (United States) B Suarez	6	6

Quarterfinals
1	(United States) D Milavsky (United States) B Shick	7	7^{7}
WC	(United States) M Forbes (Czech Republic) D Peták	5	6^{1}
(United Kingdom) J MacKinlay (United Kingdom) O Okonkwo	7^{7}	6^{5}	[6]
(United States) A Rybakov (United States) K Smith	6^{2}	7^{7}	[10]
(United States) B Carpico (United States) NS Filin	6	6
4	(Venezuela) LD Martínez (Japan) J Trotter	3	4
WC	(United Kingdom) A Okonkwo (United States) P Stearns	6	7
2	(United States) A Ayeni (United States) B Suarez	3	5

Semifinals
1	(United States) D Milavsky (United States) B Shick	7	6
(United States) A Rybakov (United States) K Smith	5	0
(United States) B Carpico (United States) NS Filin	7^{11}	6
WC	(United Kingdom) A Okonkwo (United States) P Stearns	6^{9}	3

Final
1	(United States) D Milavsky (United States) B Shick	6^{3}	6	[4]
(United States) B Carpico (United States) NS Filin	7^{7}	2	[10]
