= Dylan Dietrich =

Swiss tennis player (born 2004)

- Country (sports): Switzerland
- Born: 22 September 2004 (age 22) Zurich, Switzerland
- Height: 1.93 m (6 ft 4 in)
- Plays: Right-handed (two-handed backhand)
- College: Virginia
- Prize money: US $103,779

Singles
- Career record: 0–1 (at ATP Tour level, Grand Slam level, and in Davis Cup)
- Career titles: 1 ATP Challenger, 1 ITF
- Highest ranking: No. 186 (16 November 2026)
- Current ranking: No. 186 (16 November 2026)

Doubles
- Career record: 1–1 (at ATP Tour level, Grand Slam level, and in Davis Cup)
- Career titles: 1 ITF
- Highest ranking: No. 878 (21 September 2026)
- Current ranking: No. 890 (16 November 2026)
- Last updated on: 16 November 2026.

Dylan Dietrich (born 22 September 2004) is a Swiss tennis player. Dietrich has a career high ATP singles ranking of world No. 186 achieved on 16 November 2026 and a doubles ranking of No. 878 achieved on 21 September 2026.

Dietrich plays college tennis at Virginia.

== Career ==
Dietrich made his ATP Tour main draw debut at the 2026 Swiss Open Gstaad after progressing through qualifying.. He lost in the first round to fellow Swiss player Jérôme Kym in a third set tiebreak.

He won his first ATP Challenger singles title at the 2026 Columbus Challenger, defeating seventh seed Abdullah Shelbayh in the final.

== ATP Challenger Tour finals ==
=== Singles: 2 (titles) ===
Legend ATP Challenger Tour (2–0)	Finals by surface Hard (2–0)

Result	W–L	Date	Tournament	Tier	Surface	Opponent	Score
Win	1–0	Oct 2026	Columbus Challenger, US	Challenger	Hard (i)	(Jordan) Abdullah Shelbayh	6–3, 6–2
Win	2–0	Nov 2026	Sioux Falls Challenger, US	Challenger	Hard (i)	(Canada) Liam Draxl	1–6, 6–3, 6–4
