= USTA National Campus =

Tennis venue in Orlando, Florida

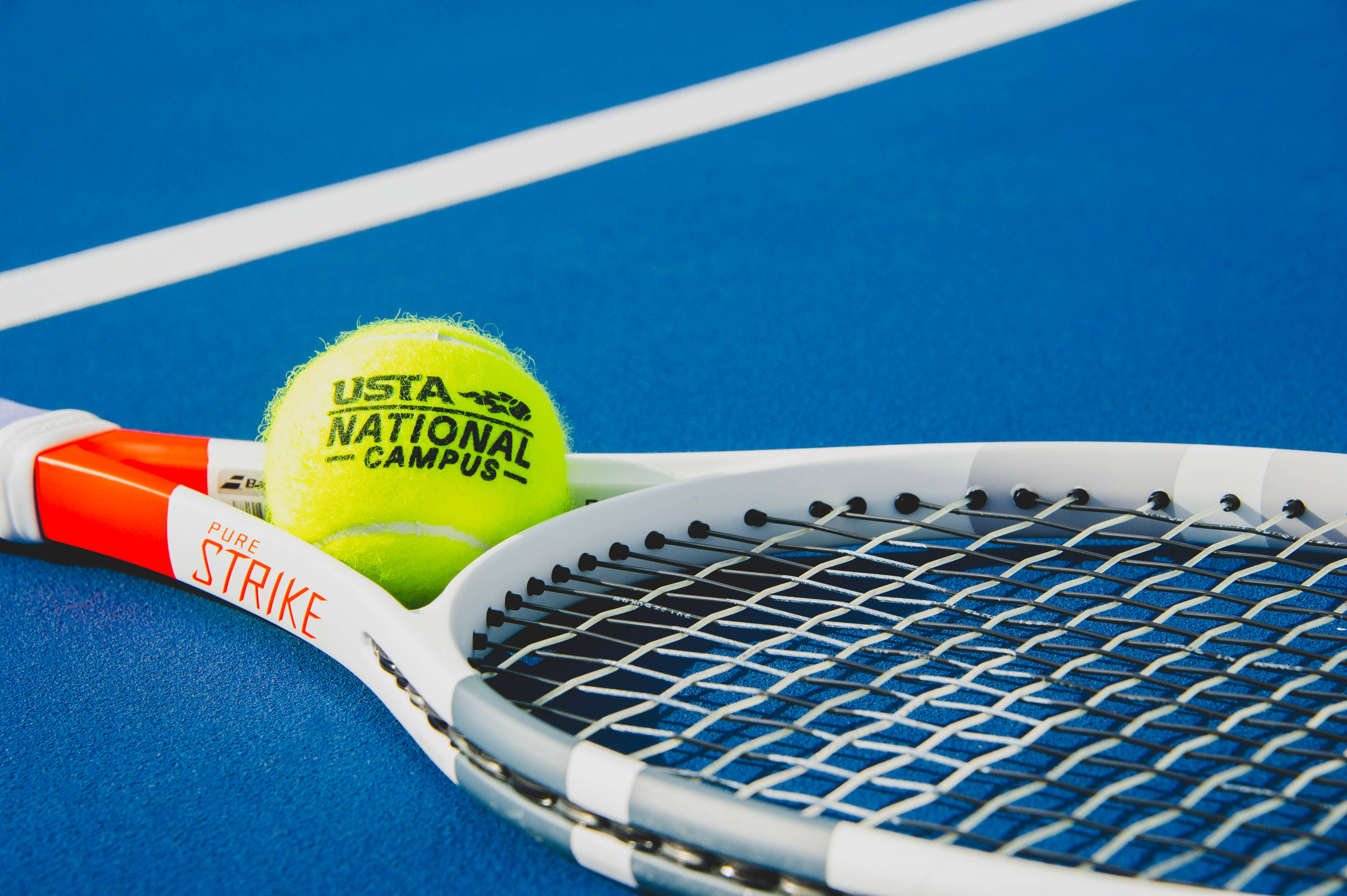
- Interactive map of USTA National Campus
- Location: Lake Nona, Orlando, Florida, U.S.
- Coordinates: 28.4006°N 81.2791°W
- Owner: United States Tennis Association
- Acreage: 64 acres (26 ha)

Construction
- Groundbreaking: April 8, 2015
- Opened: January 5, 2017
- Cost: $63 million

Website
- ustanationalcampus.com

The USTA National Campus is a tennis training center and tournament venue in Lake Nona, Orlando, Florida. Owned by the United States Tennis Association (USTA), it houses 100 tennis courts, a strength and conditioning center, and a dormitory.

== History ==
The USTA National Campus broke ground on April 8, 2015. Originally scheduled to open in late 2016, it officially opened on January 5, 2017. Situated on 64 acres (26 ha) of land, the facility houses 100 tennis courts, comprising indoor and outdoor hardcourts, Har-Tru green clay courts, and red clay courts. It also houses a dormitory, a strength and conditioning center, a 50,000-square-foot welcome center, a pro shop, and a racket store.

In May 2019, the facility hosted the NCAA Division I Tennis Championships. In 2020, it was awarded Gold Level status by the International Tennis Federation. In April 2024, it hosted the United States' Billie Jean King Cup qualifier against Belgium. That December, the USTA announced that the NCAA Division I men's and women's tennis championships would be held at the USTA National Campus for ten years, beginning in 2028.

== Notable people ==
=== Players ===
- Michael Antonius
- Reese Brantmeier
- Francesca Di Lorenzo
- Caroline Dolehide
- Maxwell Exsted
- Bjorn Fratangelo
- Tyra Caterina Grant
- Iva Jovic
- Madison Keys
- Ashlyn Krueger
- Dana Mathewson
- Mackenzie McDonald
- Clervie Ngounoue
- Annika Penickova
- Kristina Penickova
- Alexander Razeghi

=== Staff ===
- Joanne Wallen
