= Brandon Carpico =

American tennis player

- Country (sports): United States
- Born: 14 October 2004 (age 22) Blacklick, Ohio, US
- Height: 6 ft 0 in (1.83 m)
- Plays: Right-handed (two-handed backhand)
- College: Ohio State
- Prize money: US $45,288

Singles
- Career record: 0–0
- Career titles: 0

Doubles
- Career record: 2–1
- Career titles: 1 ITF
- Highest ranking: No. 239 (October 19, 2026)
- Current ranking: No. 239 (October 19, 2026)

Grand Slam doubles results
- US Open: 3R (2026)
- Last updated on: October 19, 2026.

Brandon Carpico (born October 14, 2004) is an American tennis player. He has a career-high ATP doubles ranking of No. 239 which he achieved on October 19, 2026.

Carpico plays college tennis at Ohio State.

== Career ==
In 2025, Carpico and Nikita Samuel Filin won the M25 Columbus doubles title.

In June 2026, Carpico and Filin won the American Collegiate Player Wildcard Playoff Finals to earn a wild card into the US Open men's doubles tournament. The pair upset 8th-seeded Orlando Luz and Rafael Matos in the first round, winning 4–6, 7–6, 7–5. In the second round, they defeated Marcelo Melo and John Peers, 3–6, 7–6, 6–4 on Grandstand.

== ATP Challenger and ITF Tour finals ==
=== Doubles: 2 (titles) ===
| Legend Challenger (1–0) ITF WTT (1–0) | Finals by surface Hard (2–0) |

| Result | W–L | Date | Tournament | Tier | Surface | Partner | Opponents | Score |
|---|---|---|---|---|---|---|---|---|
| Win | 1–0 | Nov 2025 | M25 Columbus, US | WTT | Hard (i) | (United States) Nikita Samuel Filin | (United States) Sebastian Gorzny (United States) Gavin Young | 6–3, 6–2 |
| Win | 2–0 | Sep 2026 | Columbus, US | Challenger | Hard (i) | (United States) Nikita Samuel Filin | (United States) Daniel Milavsky (United States) Braden Shick | 7–6^{(7–3)}, 2–6, [10–4] |
