= North Carolina Tar Heels men's tennis =

- Founded: 1908
- University: University of North Carolina at Chapel Hill
- Head coach: Sam Paul (22nd season)
- Conference: ACC
- Location: Chapel Hill, North Carolina, US
- Home Court: Cone-Kenfield Tennis Center
- Nickname: Tar Heels
- Colors: Carolina blue and white

NCAA Tournament runner-up
- 2017

NCAA Tournament appearances
- 1977, 1978, 1992, 1993, 1996, 1997, 1998, 2000, 2001, 2002, 2003, 2004, 2005, 2006, 2007, 2008, 2009, 2010, 2011, 2012, 2014, 2015, 2016, 2017, 2018, 2019, 2021, 2022, 2023

The North Carolina Tar Heels men's tennis team, commonly referred to as Carolina, represents the University of North Carolina at Chapel Hill in NCAA Division I college tennis. North Carolina currently competes as a member of the Atlantic Coast Conference (ACC) and plays its home matches at Cone-Kenfield Tennis Center.
