= Virginia Cavaliers men's tennis =

NCAA Division I men's tennis team

- University: University of Virginia
- Head coach: Andres Pedroso (7th season)
- Conference: ACC
- Location: Charlottesville, Virginia, US
- Home Court: Virginia Tennis Facility at the Boar's Head Resort
- Nickname: Cavaliers (official); Wahoos (unofficial)
- Colors: Orange and blue

NCAA Tournament championships
- 2013, 2015, 2016, 2017, 2022, 2023, 2026

NCAA Tournament runner-up
- 2011, 2012

Conference Tournament championships
- 2004, 2005, 2007–2015, 2017, 2021, 2022, 2023

Conference regular season champions
- 2004–2016, 2021, 2022, 2023

The Virginia Cavaliers men's tennis team represents the University of Virginia in NCAA Division I men's tennis as part of the Atlantic Coast Conference. The team is coached by Andres Pedroso. Since 2021, the Cavaliers have played at the Virginia Tennis Facility at the Boar's Head Resort in Charlottesville, Virginia. During the indoor portion of their season, they play on the Boyd Tinsley Courts at the nearby Boar's Head Sports Club.

Virginia has won seven recent NCAA Championships, their first in 2013 followed by three consecutive national titles in 2015–2017, back to back titles in 2022–2023, and most recently in 2026.

== History ==
The program first experienced a major renaissance when the program built new facilities and hired former coach Brian Boland as head coach in 2002. In his third season, he led the team to their first ACC regular season and tournament titles. The Cavaliers reached their first finals of the NCAA Division I Men's Tennis Championship in 2011, falling to the USC Trojans by a score of 4–3. The program's first NCAA title came two years later, with the Cavaliers defeating UCLA in the finals.

The team has won the NCAA championship seven times, in 2013, 2015, 2016, 2017, 2022, 2023, and 2026. Their 2013 title was the first men's tennis title won by an ACC team. Additionally, the team has also won the ITA National Team Indoor Championship six times. The Cavaliers have won the ACC regular season title 13 times, all consecutively from 2004 to 2016. They were also the ACC Tournament champions in 11 of those years. From April 2006 to February 2016, the Virginia Cavaliers men's tennis team beat 140 consecutive ACC opponents. This winning streak is a record across all ACC sports.

On May 24, 2017, Andres Pedroso was named director of tennis and head coach of the team, replacing Boland who had accepted the Head of Men's Tennis position at USTA Player Development.

On May 22, 2022, the Cavaliers swept Kentucky to win their 5th National Championship. This 4–0 victory concluded an impressive tournament run from the Cavaliers, beating the SEC's best to offer in South Carolina, Florida, Tennessee and the aforementioned Kentucky Wildcats. One year later, UVA repeated as national champions after beating the Ohio State Buckeyes 4–0 in the NCAA Finals, winning the doubles point and sweeping the top three courts.

On May 16, 2026, the Cavaliers defeated top overall seed and defending champions Wake Forest in a 4–3 comeback semifinal win. The next day the team defeated the Texas Longhorns 4–3 to win their 7th National Championship.

== Notable former players ==
- Collin Altamirano
- JC Aragone
- Somdev Devvarman
- Treat Huey
- Dominic Inglot
- Jarmere Jenkins
- Rafael Jodar
- Thai-Son Kwiatkowski
- Brandon Nakashima
- Alexander Ritschard
- Ryan Shane
- Sanam Singh
- Carl Söderlund
- Brian Vahaly

== Honors ==
=== Individual NCAA Champions ===
==== Singles ====
- Somdev Devvarman, 2007 & 2008
- Ryan Shane, 2015
- Thai-Son Kwiatkowski, 2017

==== Doubles ====
- Dominic Inglot and Michael Shabaz, 2009
- Drew Courtney and Michael Shabaz, 2010
- Jarmere Jenkins and Mac Styslinger, 2013
- Mans Dahlberg and Dylan Dietrich, 2025

=== All-Americans ===
- Brian Vahaly (1999, 2000, 2001)
- Huntley Montgomery (2001)
- Doug Stewart (2004, 2005)
- Somdev Devvarman (2006, 2007, 2008)
- Nick Meythaler (2006)
- Rylan Rizza (2006)
- Treat Huey (2007, 2008)
- Dominic Inglot (2008, 2009)
- Michael Shabaz (2009, 2010, 2011)
- Sanam Singh (2009, 2010)
- Drew Courtney (2010, 2011, 2012)
- Alex Domijan (2011, 2012, 2013, 2014)
- Jarmere Jenkins (2012, 2013)
- Mitchell Frank (2012, 2014, 2015)
- Mac Styslinger (2013)
- Ryan Shane (2015, 2016)
- Luca Corinteli (2015, 2016)
- Thai-Son Kwiatkowski (2015, 2016, 2017)
- Carl Söderlund (2019, 2021)
- Iñaki Montes de la Torre (2022, 2023)
- Chris Rodesch (2022, 2023)
- Ryan Goetz (2023)

=== ITA National Coach of the Year ===
- Brian Boland, 2008 & 2016
- Andres Pedroso, 2022 & 2023

=== ITA National Assistant Coach of the Year ===
- Tony Bresky, 2005
- Andres Pedroso, 2014
- Dustin Taylor, 2017
- Scott Brown, 2022

Information about honors and former players cited from the 2017 team fact book
