= Nikita Samuel Filin =

American tennis player (born 2006)

- Country (sports): United States
- Born: 3 May 2006 (age 20) Glenview, Illinois, US
- Height: 6 ft 0 in (1.83 m)
- Plays: Left-handed (two-handed backhand)
- Coach: Mark Bey
- Prize money: US $65,275

Singles
- Career record: 0–0
- Career titles: 0
- Highest ranking: No. 1,142 (August 24, 2026)
- Current ranking: No. 1,207 (October 26, 2026)

Doubles
- Career record: 2–2
- Career titles: 0
- Highest ranking: No. 220 (October 26, 2026)
- Current ranking: No. 220 (October 26, 2026)

Grand Slam doubles results
- US Open: 3R (2026)
- Last updated on: October 26, 2026.

Nikita Samuel Filin (born May 3, 2006) is an American tennis player. He has a career-high ATP singles ranking of No. 1,142 achieved on August 24, 2026 and a doubles ranking of No. 220 achieved on October 26, 2026.

== Career ==
In July 2024, Filin received entry into the Chicago Men's Challenger qualifying draw as a wild card, but lost in the first round.

Alongside Alexander Razeghi, the duo were given a wild card into the main draw of the 2024 US Open men's doubles tournament.

In 2026, Filin and Brandon Carpico earned a wild card into the 2026 US Open men's doubles tournament. The pair upset 8th-seeded Orlando Luz and Rafael Matos in the first round, winning 4–6, 7–6, 7–5. In the second round, they defeated Marcelo Melo and John Peers 3–6, 7–6, 6–4 on Grandstand.

== ATP Challenger and ITF Tour finals ==
=== Doubles: 3 (3 titles) ===
Legend ATP Challenger (1–0) ITF WTT (2–0)	Finals by surface Hard (3–0)

Result	W–L	Date	Tournament	Tier	Surface	Partner	Opponents	Score
Win	1–0	Nov 2025	M25 Columbus, US	WTT	Hard (i)	(United States) Brandon Carpico	(United States) Sebastian Gorzny (United States) Gavin Young	6–3, 6–2
Win	2–0	Jul 2026	M25 Champaign, US	WTT	Hard	(United States) Tyler Bowers	(United States) Vignesh Gogineni (United States) Billy Suarez	4–6, 6–3, [10–7]
Win	3–0	Sep 2026	Columbus, US	Challenger	Hard (i)	(United States) Brandon Carpico	(United States) Daniel Milavsky (United States) Braden Shick	7–6^{(7–3)}, 2–6, [10–4]
