= 2001 NCAA Division I men's tennis championships =

- Date: May 2001
- Edition: 55th
- Location: Athens, Georgia
- Venue: Dan Magill Tennis Complex; University of Georgia

Champions

Men's singles
- (United States) Matias Boeker (Georgia)

Men's doubles
- (United States) Matias Boeker / (United States) Travis Parrott (Georgia)

Men's team
- Georgia
← 2000 ·	NCAA Division I men's tennis championships	· 2002 →

The 2001 NCAA Division I men's tennis championships were the 55th annual championships to determine the national champions of NCAA Division I men's singles, doubles, and team collegiate tennis in the United States.

Hosts Georgia defeated Tennessee in the championship final, 4–1, to claim the Bulldog's fourth team national title. Georgia thus completed a sweep of all three men's titles: team, singles, and doubles.

== Host sites ==
This year's tournaments were played at the Dan Magill Tennis Complex at the University of Georgia in Athens, Georgia.

The men's and women's tournaments would not be held at the same site until 2006.

== Brackets ==
=== Team ===
First round
Stanford	4
Pacific	0
Florida	1
Oklahoma State	4
Pepperdine	4
Western Michigan	0
Indiana	1
Indiana State	4
Tennessee	4
UMBC	0
Ohio State	4
VCU	3
Army	0
South Alabama	4
Kentucky	4
Michigan	1
Texas A&M	4
St. Bonaventure	0
Arizona State	1
Vanderbilt	4
LSU	4
Marist	0
Florida Atlantic	1
Texas	4
Texas–Arlington	0
TCU	4
Baylor	2
Tulane	4
Jackson State	0
Ole Miss	4
USC	4
Virginia	0
Sacramento State	0
UCLA	4
South Carolina	3
South Florida	4
Hofstra	0
Washington	4
Harvard	0
Notre Dame	4
Oral Roberts	0
SMU	4
Arkansas	4
North Carolina	2
Illinois	4
Murray State	0
Middle Tennessee State	0
Mississippi State	4
Furman	0
Georgia	4
Arizona	2
Georgia Tech	4
BYU	1
California	4
Fresno State	4
Wake Forest	3
Duke	4
Hampton	0
Auburn	4
Rice	1
Charleston Southern	0
Miami (FL)	4
Alabama	1
Minnesota	4

Second round
Stanford	4
Oklahoma State	0
Pepperdine	4
Indiana State	1
Tennessee	4
Ohio State	1
South Alabama	4
Kentucky	2
Texas A&M	4
Vanderbilt	0
LSU	4
Texas	2
TCU	4
Tulane	2
Ole Miss	3
USC	4
UCLA	4
South Florida	0
Washington	4
Notre Dame	1
SMU	4
Arkansas	3
Illinois	2
Mississippi State	4
Georgia	4
Georgia Tech	0
California	4
Fresno State	2
Duke	4
Auburn	0
Miami (FL)	4
Minnesota	1

Third round
Stanford	4
Pepperdine	1
Tennessee	4
South Alabama	0
Texas A&M	4
LSU	1
TCU	4
USC	2
UCLA	4
Washington	1
SMU	4
Mississippi State	2
Georgia	4
California	0
Duke	4
Miami (FL)

Quarterfinals
Stanford	2
Tennessee	4
Texas A&M	1
TCU	4
UCLA	3
SMU	4
Georgia	4
Duke	3

Semifinals
Tennessee	4
TCU	0
SMU	0
Georgia	4

Championship
Tennessee	1
Georgia	4

== See also ==
- 2001 NCAA Division I women's tennis championships
- 2001 NCAA Division II men's tennis championships
- 2001 NCAA Division III men's tennis championships
- 2001 NAIA men's tennis championships
