= 2024 NCAA Division I Men's Tennis Championships =

- Date: May 3–25, 2024
- Edition: 78th
- Location: Stillwater, Oklahoma
- Venue: Greenwood Tennis Center; Hosted by: Oklahoma State

Champions

Men's singles
- Filip Planinsek (Alabama)

Men's doubles
- Robert Cash and JJ Tracy (Ohio State)

Men's team
- TCU Horned Frogs
- NCAA Division I Men's Tennis Championships

The 2024 NCAA Division I Men's Tennis Championships were the men's tennis tournaments played from May 3 to May 25, 2024, at campus sites and Stillwater, Oklahoma, at the Greenwood Tennis Center. It was the 78th edition of the NCAA Division I Men's Tennis Championship. Starting with the 2024–25 season, individual championships moved to the fall. For the tournament held in November 2024, see the 2025 Championships page.

== Men's team championship ==
There were 64 teams selected for the men's team championship, 29 of which were automatic qualifiers from each Division I conference. The remaining 35 teams were selected at-large. Teams played two rounds of single-elimination matches in groups of four from May 3–4 at campus sites; the winners of those regionals advanced to a super-regional round on May 10 or 11, also held at campus sites. The remaining eight teams advanced to the championship rounds in Stillwater, Oklahoma.

=== Automatic qualifiers ===
The following 29 teams were automatic qualifiers, representing their conferences:

Conference	Team
American	Charlotte
Atlantic 10	VCU
ACC	Florida State
ASUN	North Florida
Big East	DePaul
Big Sky	Sacramento State
Big South	UNC Asheville
Big Ten	Ohio State
Big 12	Texas
Big West	UC Irvine
CAA	UNC Wilmington
Conference USA	Middle Tennessee
Horizon	Cleveland State
Ivy	Columbia
MAAC	Quinnipiac
MAC	Toledo
MEAC	South Carolina State
Mountain West	Boise State
Northeast	Binghamton
Pac-12	Arizona
Patriot	Boston University
SEC	Kentucky
Southern	East Tennessee State
Southland	NJIT
SWAC	Alabama State
Summit	Denver
Sun Belt	Old Dominion
West Coast	San Diego
WAC	UT Arlington

=== National seeds ===
Sixteen teams were selected as national seeds and were guaranteed to host for the first two rounds if they submitted a bid and met the criteria.

1. Ohio State (semifinals)
2. Texas (runner-up)
3. Virginia (quarterfinals)
4. TCU (National Champions)
5. Kentucky (quarterfinals)
6. Wake Forest (semifinals)
7. Tennessee (quarterfinals)
8. Columbia (quarterfinals)
9. Arizona (super regionals)
10. Florida State (super regionals)
11. Oklahoma (second round)
12. Harvard (super regionals)
13. Duke (super regionals)
14. NC State (second round)
15. Texas A&M (super regionals)
16. Mississippi State (super regionals)

=== Bracket ===
Bold indicates winner. Host institutions for the first two rounds and Super Regionals are marked with an asterisk (*).

**First Round**; May 3–4, 2024; Campus sites
1	**Ohio State***	**4**
Cleveland State	0
Columbus, Ohio
Vanderbilt	1
**Oklahoma State**	**4**
Georgia Tech	1
**Middle Tennessee**	**4**
Starkville, Mississippi
Alabama State	0
16	**Mississippi State***	**4**
9	**Arizona***	**4**
Boise State	0
Tucson, Arizona
Pepperdine	3
**Auburn**	**4**
**Michigan**	**4**
Binghamton	0
New York City, New York
Quinnipiac	0
8	**Columbia***	**4**
5	**Kentucky***	**4**
DePaul	0
Lexington, Kentucky
Toledo	1
**Illinois**	**4**
**Michigan State**	**4**
Denver	0
Cambridge, Massachusetts
Boston University	0
12	**Harvard***	**4**
13	**Duke***	**4**
UNC Asheville	0
Durham, North Carolina
Charlotte	1
**Alabama**	**4**
Arkansas	0
**Cornell**	**4**
Fort Worth, Texas
UC Irvine	0
4	**TCU***	**4**
3	**Virginia***	**4**
NJIT	0
Charlottesville, Virginia
**VCU**	**4**
Princeton	2
**South Carolina**	**4**
Old Dominion	1
Raleigh, North Carolina
UNC Wilmington	0
14	**NC State***	**4**
11	**Oklahoma***	**4**
UT Arlington	0
Norman, Oklahoma
SMU	0
**Stanford**	**4**
**Arizona State**	**4**
Georgia	3
Winston-Salem, North Carolina
South Carolina State	0
6	**Wake Forest***	**4**
7	**Tennessee***	**4**
ETSU	0
Knoxville, Tennessee
**Memphis**	**4**
North Carolina	3
Florida	3
**UCF**	**4**
Tallahassee, Florida
North Florida	1
10	**Florida State***	**4**
15	**Texas A&M***	**4**
Rice	0
College Station, Texas
Baylor	1
**San Diego**	**4**
**UCLA**	**4**
LSU	3
Austin, Texas
Sacramento State	0
2	**Texas***	**4**

**Second Round**; May 3–4, 2024; Campus sites
1	**Ohio State**	**4**
Oklahoma State	1
Middle Tennessee	0
16	**Mississippi State**	**4**
9	**Arizona**	**4**
Auburn	0
Michigan	2
8	**Columbia**	**4**
5	**Kentucky**	**4**
Illinois	3
Michigan State	0
12	**Harvard**	**4**
13	**Duke**	**4**
Alabama	0
Cornell	0
4	**TCU**	**4**
3	**Virginia**	**4**
VCU	0
**South Carolina**	**4**
14	NC State	3
11	Oklahoma	2
**Stanford**	**4**
Arizona State	3
6	**Wake Forest**	**4**
7	**Tennessee**	**4**
Memphis	0
UCF	1
10	**Florida State**	**4**
15	**Texas A&M**	**4**
San Diego	2
UCLA	0
2	**Texas**	**4**

**Super Regionals**; May 10 or 11, 2024; Campus sites
1	**Ohio State***	**4**
16	Mississippi State	1
9	Arizona	3
8	**Columbia***	**4**
5	**Kentucky***	**4**
12	Harvard	2
13	Duke	0
4	**TCU***	**4**
3	**Virginia***	**4**
South Carolina	1
Stanford	1
6	**Wake Forest***	**4**
7	**Tennessee***	**4**
10	Florida State	3
15	Texas A&M	0
2	**Texas***	**4**

**Quarterfinals**; May 16, 2024; Stillwater
1	**Ohio State**	**4**
8	Columbia	2
5	Kentucky	0
4	**TCU**	**4**
3	Virginia	1
6	**Wake Forest**	**4**
7	Tennessee	2
2	**Texas**	**4**

**Semifinals**; May 18, 2024; Stillwater
1	Ohio State	2
4	**TCU**	**4**
6	Wake Forest	2
2	**Texas**	**4**

**Championship**; May 19, 2024; Stillwater
4	**TCU**	**4**
2	Texas	3

Bracket source:

== Men's singles championship ==
There were 64 singles players selected to the men's singles championship, 15 of which were automatic qualifiers from each Division I conference with an eligible team ranked in the ITA Top 125. The remaining 49 players were selected at-large. The tournament was played following the team championship from May 20 to 25 in Stillwater, Oklahoma.

Alabama junior Filip Planinsek won the men's singles title against Columbia sophomore Michael Zheng 6–7 (4), 6–3, 6–2.

=== Automatic qualifiers ===
The following 15 players were automatic qualifiers, representing their conferences:

Conference	Player	Team
American	Trevor Svajda	SMU
A-10	Mathis Bondaz	VCU
ACC	Antoine Cornut-Chauvinc	Florida State
ASUN	Jonas Hartenstein	North Florida
Big 12	Eliot Spizzirri	Texas
Big Ten	Ozan Baris	Michigan State
Big West	Pablo Masjuan	UC Santa Barbara
CUSA	Leo Raquin	Middle Tennessee
MAC	Pawit Sornlaksup	Toledo
Mountain West	Samuel Sippel	Boise State
Pac-12	Nishesh Basavareddy	Stanford
SEC	Johannus Monday	Tennessee
Ivy	Cooper Williams	Harvard
West Coast	Oliver Tarvet	San Diego
WAC	Joan Torres Espinosa	UT Arlington

=== National seeds ===
The following sixteen players were seeded for this tournament:

1. Johannus Monday (Tennessee)
2. Eliot Spizzirri (Texas)
3. Antoine Cornut-Chauvinc (Florida State)
4. Chris Rodesch (Virginia)
5. Toby Samuel (South Carolina)
6. Micah Braswell (Texas)
7. Oliver Tarvet (San Diego)
8. Jake Fearnley (TCU)

Players ranked 9th–16th, listed by last name

- Ozan Baris (Michigan State)
- Nishesh Basavareddy (Stanford)
- Murphy Cassone (Arizona State)
- Andres Martin (Georgia Tech)
- Alex Martinez (Oklahoma)
- Radu Papoe (Cornell)
- Jack Pinnington (TCU)
- Cooper Williams (Harvard)

=== Draw ===
Bracket:

==== Finals ====
Quarterfinals
Jack Anthrop (Ohio State)	4	1
8	Ozan Baris (Michigan State)	6	6
9–16	Cooper Williams (Harvard)	4	6	4
Filip Planinsek (Alabama)	6	1	6
Colton Smith (Arizona)	6	2	7^{3}
9–16	Murphy Cassone (Arizona State)	4	6	6
Michael Zheng (Columbia)	2	7	6
JJ Tracy (Ohio State)	6	5	3

Semifinals
8	Ozan Baris (Michigan State)	5	7	6
Filip Planinsek (Alabama)	7	5	7^{6}
Colton Smith (Arizona)	6	3	5
Michael Zheng (Columbia)	1	6	7

Final
Filip Planinsek (Alabama)	6	6	6
Michael Zheng (Columbia)	7^{4}	3	2

==== Section 1 ====
First round
Ryan Colby (Georgia)	4	2
Dylan Dietrich (Virginia)	6	6
Thomas Paulsell (Georgia)	6	6
Samuel Sippel (Boise State)	3	4
9–16	Radu Papoe (Cornell)	2	6	4
Jack Anthrop (Ohio State)	6	4	6
Quinn Vandecasteele (Oregon)	6	6
Petar Jovanovic (Mississippi State)	1	3
8	Ozan Baris (Michigan State)	6	6
Tyler Stice (Auburn)	2	4
Gilles-Arnaud Bailly (Texas)	5	2
Samir Banerjee (Stanford)	7	6
9–16	Jack Pinnington (TCU)	7	6
Pablo Alemany (Memphis)	5	4
Nikola Slavic (Ole Miss)	6	6
Joan Torres Espinosa (UT Arlington)	1	0

Second round
D Dietrich (Virginia)	6	6
T Paulsell (Georgia)	4	3
J Anthrop (Ohio State)	6	6
Q Vandecasteele (Oregon)	3	1
8	O Baris (Michigan State)	4	6	6
S Banerjee (Stanford)	6	0	2
9–16	J Pinnington (TCU)	6	6
N Slavic (Ole Miss)	4	2

Third round
D Dietrich (Virginia)	5	6
J Anthrop (Ohio State)	7	7^{5}
8	O Baris (Michigan State)	6	7^{5}
9–16	J Pinnington (TCU)	1	6

Quarterfinals
J Anthrop (Ohio State)	4	1
8	O Baris (Michigan State)	6	6

==== Section 2 ====
First round
4	Toby Samuel (South Carolina)	7^{1}	6	3
Pablo Masjuan (UC Santa Barbara)	6	7^{5}	6
Raphael Perot (Texas A&M)	5	6
Sebastian Dominko (Notre Dame)	7	7^{6}
9–16	Cooper Williams (Harvard)	6	6
Alvin Tudorica (South Florida)	1	1
Garrett Johns (Duke)	3	6
Tyler Zink (Oklahoma State)	6	7^{8}
5	Micah Braswell (Texas)	6	6
Jeremy Jin (Florida)	3	4
Taha Baadi (Kentucky)	6	6
Hunter Heck (Illinois)	1	2
9–16	Cannon Kingsley (Ohio State)	3	6	6
Jay Friend (Arizona)	6	2	2
Jonas Hartenstein (North Florida)	2	1
Filip Planinsek (Alabama)	6	6

Second round
P Masjuan (UC Santa Barbara)	3	6	6
S Dominko (Notre Dame)	6	3	4
9–16	C Williams (Harvard)	7^{4}	6
T Zink (Oklahoma State)	6	3
5	M Braswell (Texas)	6	6
T Baadi (Kentucky)	1	3
9–16	C Kingsley (Ohio State)	6	1
F Planinsek (Alabama)	7^{5}	6

Third round
P Masjuan (UC Santa Barbara)	6	3
9–16	C Williams (Harvard)	7^{2}	6
5	M Braswell (Texas)	4	4
F Planinsek (Alabama)	6	6

Quarterfinals
9–16	C Williams (Harvard)	4	6	4
F Planinsek (Alabama)	6	1	6

==== Section 3 ====
First round
Danil Panarin (Vanderbilt)	5	2
Justin Boulais (Ohio State)	7	6
Robin Catry (NC State)	1	6	2
9–16	Nishesh Basavareddy (Stanford)	6	4	6
Pawit Sornlaksup (Toledo)	4	3
Colton Smith (Arizona)	6	6
Ronnie Hohmann (Michigan State)	1	4
6	Oliver Tarvet (San Diego)	6	6
Trevor Svajda (SMU)	6	1	6
Olle Wallin (Texas Tech)	4	6	4
Jonah Braswell (Texas)	7	6	3
9–16	Murphy Cassone (Arizona State)	5	7^{4}	6
Pedro Rodenas (Duke)	3	6	6
Karlis Ozolins (Illinois)	6	2	7^{1}
Nemanja Malesevic (Mississippi State)	3	2
3	Antoine Cornut-Chauvinc (Florida State)	6	6

Second round
J Boulais (Ohio State)	1	5
9–16	N Basavareddy (Stanford)	6	7
Colton Smith (Arizona)	6	6
6	O Tarvet (San Diego)	2	4
T Svajda (SMU)	3	7	2
9–16	M Cassone (Arizona State)	6	5	6
K Ozolins (Illinois)	2	6	6
3	A Cornut-Chauvinc (Florida State)	6	3	2

Third round
9–16	N Basavareddy (Stanford)	6	2
C Smith (Arizona)	7^{2}	6
9–16	M Cassone (Arizona State)	6	6
K Ozolins (Illinois)	1	0

Quarterfinals
C Smith (Arizona)	6	2	7^{3}
9–16	M Cassone (Arizona State)	4	6	6

==== Section 4 ====
First round
Michael Zheng (Columbia)	6	6
Govind Nanda (UCLA)	3	3
Matisse Bobichon (VCU)	6	4	6
9–16	Andres Martin (Georgia Tech)	4	6	2
Finn Murgett (Auburn)	4	6	6
Gavin Young (Michigan)	6	2	4
Leo Raquin (Middle Tennessee)	3	1
7	Jake Fearnley (TCU)	6	6
JJ Tracy (Ohio State)	6	7
JC Roddick (Texas A&M)	4	5
Pierce Rollins (Tulsa)	7^{3}	3	0
9–16	Alex Martinez (Oklahoma)	6	6	6
Shunsuke Mitsui (Tennessee)	7^{7}	6
Edward Winter (Pepperdine)	6	3
Filippo Moroni (Wake Forest)	6	7
2	Eliot Spizzirri (Texas)	1	5

Second round
M Zheng (Columbia)	2	7^{2}	6
M Bobichon (VCU)	6	6	2
F Murgett (Auburn)	6	3	2
7	J Fearnley (TCU)	4	6	6
J Tracy (Ohio State)	6	7^{6}
9–16	A Martinez (Oklahoma)	3	6
S Mitsui (Tennessee)	6	6	6
F Moroni (Wake Forest)	2	7^{1}	4

Third round
M Zheng (Columbia)	6	3	6
7	J Fearnley (TCU)	2	6	4
J Tracy (Ohio State)	6	6
S Mitsui (Tennessee)	3	4

Quarterfinals
M Zheng (Columbia)	2	7	6
J Tracy (Ohio State)	6	5	3

== Men's doubles championship ==
There were 32 doubles teams selected to the men's doubles championship, 14 of whom were automatic qualifiers from each Division I conference with an eligible team ranked in the ITA Top 60. The remaining 18 teams were selected at-large. The tournament was played following the team championship from May 20 to 25 in Stillwater, Oklahoma.

Robert Cash and JJ Tracy of Ohio State beat Antoine Cornut-Chauvinc and Joshua Dous Karpenschif of Florida State to win the men's double title.

=== Automatic qualifiers ===
The following 14 teams were automatic qualifiers, representing their conferences:

Conference	Player	Team
American	Huntley Allen	SMU
American	Adam Neff	SMU
A-10	Oscar Pinto Sansano	VCU
A-10	German Samofalov	VCU
ACC	Garrett Johns	Duke
ACC	Pedro Rodenas	Duke
Big 12	Sebastian Gorzny	TCU
Big 12	Pedro Vives Marcos	TCU
Big Ten	Robert Cash	Ohio State
Big Ten	JJ Tracy	Ohio State
Big West	Gianluca Brunkow	UC Santa Barbara
Big West	Pablo Masjuan	UC Santa Barbara
CUSA	Ondrej Horak	Middle Tennessee
CUSA	Leo Raquin	Middle Tennessee
CAA	Reece Falck	UNC Wilmington
CAA	Harold Huens	UNC Wilmington
Mountain West	Samuel Sippel	Boise State
Mountain West	Jip van Assendelft	Boise State
Pac-12	Jacob Bullard	Arizona State
Pac-12	Murphy Cassone	Arizona State
SEC	Joshua Lapadat	Kentucky
SEC	JJ Mercer	Kentucky
Sun Belt	Codie Van Schalkwyk	Old Dominion
Sun Belt	Connor Van Schalkwyk	Old Dominion
Ivy	Theo Winegar	Columbia
Ivy	Michael Zheng	Columbia
West Coast	Stian Klaassen	San Diego
West Coast	Sacchitt Sharrma	San Diego

=== National seeds ===
The following eight teams were seeded for this tournament:

1. Garrett Johns / Pedro Rodenas (Duke)
2. Holden Koons / Dhakshineswar Suresh (Wake Forest)
3. Joshua Lapadat / JJ Mercer (Kentucky)
4. Robert Cash / JJ Tracy (Ohio State) (National Champions)

Players ranked 5th–8th, listed by institution

- Etienne Donnet / Natan Rodrigues (Louisville)
- Sebastian Dominko / Jean Marc Malkowski (Notre Dame)
- Angel Diaz / Johannus Monday (Tennessee)
- James Hopper / Inaki Montes de la Torre (Virginia)

=== Draw ===
Bracket:

==== Finals ====
Semifinals
5–8	Etienne Donnet (Louisville); Natan Rodrigues (Louisville)	2	6	[10]
4	Robert Cash (Ohio State); JJ Tracy (Ohio State)	6	4	[12]
Antoine Cornut-Chauvinc (Florida State); Joshua Dous Karpenschif (Florida State)	6	6
Cleeve Harper (Texas); Eliot Spizzirri (Texas)	4	3

Final
4	Robert Cash (Ohio State); JJ Tracy (Ohio State)	5	7^{6}	[11]
Antoine Cornut-Chauvinc (Florida State); Joshua Dous Karpenschif (Florida State)	7	6	9

==== Top half ====
First round
1	Garrett Johns (Duke); Pedro Rodenas (Duke)	6	7^{9}
Casey Hoole (South Carolina); Toby Samuel (South Carolina)	3	6
Keshav Chopra (Georgia Tech); Marcus McDaniel (Georgia Tech)	3	3
Isaac Becroft (Oklahoma State); Tyler Zink (Oklahoma State)	6	6
5–8	Etienne Donnet (Louisville); Natan Rodrigues (Louisville)	6	7^{4}
Codie Van Schalkwyk (Old Dominion); Connor Van Schalkwyk (Old Dominion)	1	6
Freddy Blaydes (Georgia); Niels Ratiu (Georgia)	6	6
Ondrej Horak (Middle Tennessee); Leo Raquin (Middle Tennessee)	3	2
4	Robert Cash (Ohio State); JJ Tracy (Ohio State)	6	6
Huntley Allen (SMU); Adam Neff (SMU)	4	2
Theo Winegar (Columbia); Michael Zheng (Columbia)	7	3	5
Raul Dobai (Auburn); Finn Murgett (Auburn)	5	6	[10]
5–8	Sebastian Dominko (Notre Dame); Jean Marc Malkowski (Notre Dame)	4	3
Hunter Heck (Illinois); Karlis Ozolins (Illinois)	6	6
Bozo Barun (Arkansas); Jared Horwood (Arkansas)	6	5	[10]
Stian Klaassen (San Diego); Sacchitt Sharrma (San Diego)	4	7	2

Second round
1	G Johns (Duke); P Rodenas (Duke)	6	4	[10]
I Becroft (Oklahoma State); T Zink (Oklahoma State)	4	6	1
5–8	E Donnet (Louisville); N Rodrigues (Louisville)	5	6	[10]
F Blaydes (Georgia); N Ratiu (Georgia)	7	1	4
4	R Cash (Ohio State); J Tracy (Ohio State)	6	6
R Dobai (Auburn); F Murgett (Auburn)	2	2
H Heck (Illinois); K Ozolins (Illinois)	5	3
B Barun (Arkansas); J Horwood (Arkansas)	7	6

Quarterfinals
1	G Johns (Duke); P Rodenas (Duke)	4	7^{0}	7
5–8	E Donnet (Louisville); N Rodrigues (Louisville)	6	6	[10]
4	R Cash (Ohio State); J Tracy (Ohio State)	6	6
B Barun (Arkansas); J Horwood (Arkansas)	3	1

Semifinals
5–8	E Donnet (Louisville); N Rodrigues (Louisville)	2	6	[10]
4	R Cash (Ohio State); J Tracy (Ohio State)	6	4	[12]

==== Bottom half ====
First round
Jacob Bickersteth (Michigan); Gavin Young (Michigan)	6	6	6
Gianluca Brunkow (UC Santa Barbara); Pablo Masjuan (UC Santa Barbara)	7^{6}	3	[10]
Antoine Cornut-Chauvinc (Florida State); Joshua Dous Karpenschif (Florida State)	6	1
5–8	Angel Diaz (Tennessee); Johannus Monday (Tennessee)	3	1^{ret.}
Jacob Bullard (Arizona State); Murphy Cassone (Arizona State)	2	6	[10]
Giulio Perego (Texas A&M); Togan Tokac (Texas A&M)	6	4	9
Filippos Astreinidis (Princeton); Paul Inchauspe (Princeton)	7	6
3	Joshua Lapadat (Kentucky); JJ Mercer (Kentucky)	5	1
Daniel Milavsky (Harvard); Cooper Williams (Harvard)	6	6
Petar Jovanovic (Mississippi State); Benito Sanchez Martinez (Mississippi State)	7^{2}	7^{4}
Pablo Alemany (Memphis); Charlie Barry (Memphis)	2	6
5–8	Sebastian Gorzny (TCU); Pedro Vives (TCU)	6	7^{3}
JJ Bianchi (Boston College); Jake Vassel (Boston College)	6	3	8
Cleeve Harper (Texas); Eliot Spizzirri (Texas)	4	6	[10]
Ozan Baris (Michigan State); Max Sheldon (Michigan State)	1	2
2	Holden Koons (Wake Forest); Dhakshineswar Suresh (Wake Forest)	6	6

Second round
G Brunkow (UC Santa Barbara); P Masjuan (UC Santa Barbara)	2	4
A Cornut-Chauvinc (Florida State); J Dous Karpenschif (Florida State)	6	6
J Bullard (Arizona State); M Cassone (Arizona State)	7^{5}	4	[10]
F Astreinidis (Princeton); P Inchauspe (Princeton)	6	6	6
P Jovanovic (Mississippi State); B Sanchez Martinez (Mississippi State)	6	7
5–8	S Gorzny (TCU); P Vives (TCU)	4	5
C Harper (Texas); E Spizzirri (Texas)	6	6
2	H Koons (Wake Forest); D Suresh (Wake Forest)	3	3

Quarterfinals
A Cornut-Chauvinc (Florida State); J Dous Karpenschif (Florida State)	6	2	[10]
J Bullard (Arizona State); M Cassone (Arizona State)	4	6	6
P Jovanovic (Mississippi State); B Sanchez Martinez (Mississippi State)	3	3
C Harper (Texas); E Spizzirri (Texas)	6	6

Semifinals
A Cornut-Chauvinc (Florida State); J Dous Karpenschif (Florida State)	6	6
C Harper (Texas); E Spizzirri (Texas)	4	3
