= NCAA Division I men's tennis championships =

US men's college tennis competition

- Current season, competition or edition: 2026 NCAA Division I Men's Tennis Championships
- Association: NCAA
- Sport: College tennis
- Founded: 1883; 143 years ago
- Division: Division I
- No. of teams: 64 teams
- Country: United States
- Most recent champions: Team: Virginia (7); Singles: Michael Zheng, Columbia; Doubles: Mans Dahlberg / Dylan Dietrich, Virginia
- Most titles: Team: USC (21)
- Website: NCAA.com

The NCAA Division I Men's Tennis Championship is an annual men's college tennis national collegiate championship sponsored by the National Collegiate Athletic Association (NCAA) for teams in Division I. The tournament crowns a team, individual, and doubles champion. Held every year since 1883 (except 2020), the championship is typically contested in May, and–in recent years–has been held at the same location as the NCAA women's Division I tournaments.

Originally known as the U.S. Intercollegiate Championships, the first championship was held in 1883, 23 years before the founding of the NCAA; Harvard's Joseph Clark won the inaugural singles title. The first NCAA-sponsored tennis tournament, however, would not be held until 1946.

In 1963, the NCAA began to organize separate tournaments for Division I and Division II (then known as the University Division and the College Division). A tournament for Division III would later be added in 1973.

For the 2024–25 seasons, NCAA and ITA held individual tournaments in the fall and team championships in the spring.

Virginia won the most recent title in 2026, their 7th. USC have been the most successful program, with 21 team national titles.

== U.S. Intercollegiate Championships ==
=== Singles and Doubles Championships (1883–1945) ===
U.S. Intercollegiate Championships
Year	Site	Court	Singles Champion	Doubles Champions
1883	Hartford, Connecticut	Trinity College	Fall; Joseph Clark (Harvard) Spring; Howard Taylor (Harvard)	Fall; Joseph Clark / Howard Taylor (Harvard) Spring; Howard Taylor / R.E. Presbrey (Harvard)
1884	Hartford, Connecticut	Trinity College	Wallace P. Knapp (Yale)	Wallace P. Knapp / William V.S. Thorne (Yale)
1885	Hartford, Connecticut	Trinity College	Wallace P. Knapp (Yale)	Wallace P. Knapp / Arthur L. Shipman (Yale)
1886	New Haven, Connecticut	New Haven Lawn Club	G.M. Brinley (Trinity–CT)	Wallace P. Knapp / William L. Thacher (Yale)
1887	New Haven, Connecticut	New Haven Lawn Club	P.S. Sears (Harvard)	P.S. Sears / Quincy Shaw (Harvard)
1888	New Haven, Connecticut	New Haven Lawn Club	P.S. Sears (Harvard)	V.G. Hall / Oliver Campbell (Columbia)
1889	New Haven, Connecticut	New Haven Lawn Club	Robert P. Huntington (Yale)	Oliver Campbell / A.E. Wright (Columbia)
1890	New Haven, Connecticut	New Haven Lawn Club	Fred Hovey (Harvard)	Quincy Shaw / S.T. Chase (Harvard)
1891	New Haven, Connecticut	New Haven Lawn Club	Fred Hovey (Harvard)	Fred Hovey / Robert Wrenn (Harvard)
1892	New Haven, Connecticut	New Haven Lawn Club	William Larned (Cornell)	Robert Wrenn / F.B. Winslow (Harvard)
1893	New Haven, Connecticut	New Haven Lawn Club	Malcolm Chace (Brown)	Malcolm Chace / C.R. Budlong (Brown)
1894	New Haven, Connecticut	New Haven Lawn Club	Malcolm Chace (Yale)	Malcolm Chace / Arthur E. Foote (Yale)
1895	New Haven, Connecticut	New Haven Lawn Club	Malcolm Chace (Yale)	Malcolm Chace / Arthur E. Foote (Yale)
1896	New Haven, Connecticut	New Haven Lawn Club	Malcolm Whitman (Harvard)	Leo Ware / W.M. Scudder (Harvard)
1897	New Haven, Connecticut	New Haven Lawn Club	S.G. Thompson (Princeton)	Leo Ware / Malcolm Whitman (Harvard)
1898	New Haven, Connecticut	New Haven Lawn Club	Leo Ware (Harvard)	Leo Ware / Malcolm Whitman (Harvard)
1899	New Haven, Connecticut	New Haven Lawn Club	Dwight Davis (Harvard)	Holcombe Ward / Dwight Davis (Harvard)
1900	Haverford, Pennsylvania	Merion Cricket Club	Raymond Little (Princeton)	Fred Alexander / Raymond Little (Princeton)
1901	Haverford, Pennsylvania	Merion Cricket Club	Fred Alexander (Princeton)	H.A. Plummer / Samuel L. Russell (Yale)
1902	Haverford, Pennsylvania	Merion Cricket Club	William Clothier (Harvard)	William Clothier / E.W. Leonard (Harvard)
1903	Haverford, Pennsylvania	Merion Cricket Club	Edward Dewhurst (Penn)	Fredrick Colston / E. Clapp (Yale)
1904	Haverford, Pennsylvania	Merion Cricket Club	Robert LeRoy (Columbia)	Karl Behr / G. Bodman (Yale)
1905	Haverford, Pennsylvania	Merion Cricket Club	Edward Dewhurst (Penn)	Edward Dewhurst / H.B. Register (Penn)
1906	Haverford, Pennsylvania	Merion Cricket Club	Robert LeRoy (Columbia)	Howard S. Wells / Albert Spaulding (Yale)
1907	Haverford, Pennsylvania	Merion Cricket Club	G. Peabody Gardner (Harvard)	Nathaniel Niles / A.S. Dabney (Harvard)
1908	Haverford, Pennsylvania	Merion Cricket Club	Nathaniel Niles (Harvard)	H.M. Tilden / A. Thayer (Penn)
1909	Haverford, Pennsylvania	Merion Cricket Club	Wallace Johnson (Penn)	Wallace Johnson / A. Thayer (Penn)
1910	Haverford, Pennsylvania	Merion Cricket Club	R.A. Holden (Yale)	Dean Mathey / Burnham Dell (Princeton)
1911	Haverford, Pennsylvania	Merion Cricket Club	E.H. Whitney (Harvard)	Dean Mathey / C.T. Butler (Penn)
1912	Haverford, Pennsylvania	Merion Cricket Club	George Church (Princeton)	George Church / W.H. Mace (Princeton)
1913	Haverford, Pennsylvania	Merion Cricket Club	Richard Williams (Harvard)	Watson Washburn / J.J. Armstrong (Harvard)
1914	Haverford, Pennsylvania	Merion Cricket Club	George Church (Princeton)	Richard Williams / Richard Harte (Harvard)
1915	Haverford, Pennsylvania	Merion Cricket Club	Richard Williams (Harvard)	Richard Williams / Richard Harte (Harvard)
1916	Haverford, Pennsylvania	Merion Cricket Club	George Caner (Harvard)	George Caner / Richard Harte (Harvard)
1919	Haverford, Pennsylvania	Merion Cricket Club	Charles Garland (Yale)	Charles Garland / K.N. Hawks (Yale)
1920	Haverford, Pennsylvania	Merion Cricket Club	Lascelles Banks (Yale)	Amos Wilder / Leland Wiley (Yale)
1921	Haverford, Pennsylvania	Merion Cricket Club	Phil Neer (Stanford)	Brooks Fenno / William Feibleman (Harvard)
1922	Haverford, Pennsylvania	Merion Cricket Club	Lucien Williams (Yale)	James Davies / Phil Neer (Stanford)
1923	Haverford, Pennsylvania	Merion Cricket Club	Carl Fischer (Philadelphia Osteopathic)	Lewis White / Louis Thalheimer (Texas)
1924	Haverford, Pennsylvania	Merion Cricket Club	Wallace Scott (Washington–St. Louis)	Lewis White / Louis Thalheimer (Texas)
1925	Haverford, Pennsylvania	Merion Cricket Club	Edward Chandler (California)	Gervais Hills / Gerald Stratford (California)
1926	Haverford, Pennsylvania	Merion Cricket Club	Edward Chandler (California)	Edward Chandler / Tom Stow (California)
1927	Haverford, Pennsylvania	Merion Cricket Club	Wilmer Allison (Texas)	John Van Ryn / Kenneth Appel (Princeton)
1928	Haverford, Pennsylvania	Merion Cricket Club	Julius Seligson (Lehigh)	Ralph McElvenny / Alan Herrington (Stanford)
1929	Haverford, Pennsylvania	Merion Cricket Club	Berkeley Bell (Texas)	Benjamin Gorchakoff / Arthur Kussman (Occidental)
1930	Haverford, Pennsylvania	Merion Cricket Club	Cliff Sutter (Tulane)	Dolf Muehleisen / Robert Muench (California)
1931	Haverford, Pennsylvania	Merion Cricket Club	Keith Gledhill (Stanford)	Bruce Barnes / Karl Kamrath (Texas)
1932	Haverford, Pennsylvania	Merion Cricket Club	Cliff Sutter (Tulane)	Keith Gledhill / Joseph Coughlin (Stanford)
1933	Haverford, Pennsylvania	Merion Cricket Club	Jack Tidball (UCLA)	Joseph Coughlin / Sam Lee (Stanford)
1934	Haverford, Pennsylvania	Merion Cricket Club	Gene Mako (USC)	Gene Mako / Phillip Castlen (USC)
1935	Evanston, Illinois	Evanston Golf Club	Wilbur Hess (Rice)	Richard Bennett / Paul Newton (California)
1936	Evanston, Illinois	Evanston Golf Club	Ernest Sutter (Tulane)	Bennett Dey / William Seward (Stanford)
1937	Haverford, Pennsylvania	Merion Cricket Club	Ernest Sutter (Tulane)	Richard Bennett / Paul Newton (California)
1938	Haverford, Pennsylvania	Merion Cricket Club	Frank Guernsey (Rice)	Joseph Hunt / Lewis Wetherell (USC)
1939	Haverford, Pennsylvania	Merion Cricket Club	Frank Guernsey (Rice)	Douglas Imhoff / Robert Peacock (California)
1940	Haverford, Pennsylvania	Merion Cricket Club	Donald McNeill (Kenyon)	Lawrence Dee / James Wade (Stanford)
1941	Haverford, Pennsylvania	Merion Cricket Club	Joseph Hunt (Navy)	Charles Olewine / Charles Mattman (USC)
1942	New Orleans	City Park Tennis Center	Ted Schroeder (Stanford)	Lawrence Dee / Ted Schroeder (Stanford)
1943	Evanston, Illinois	Vandy Christie Tennis Center	Francisco Segura (Miami–FL)	John Hickman / Walter Driver (Texas)
1944	Evanston, Illinois	Vandy Christie Tennis Center	Francisco Segura (Miami–FL)	John Hickman / Felix Kelley (Texas)
1945	Evanston, Illinois	Vandy Christie Tennis Center	Francisco Segura (Miami–FL)	Francisco Segura / Thomas Burke (Miami–FL)

== NCAA Championships ==
=== Singles, Doubles, and Team–Points Championships (1946–1976) ===
NCAA Division I Men's Tennis Championship
Year	Site	Court	Team Championship				Singles Champion	Doubles Champions
Year	Site	Court	Champion(s)	Points	Runner(s)-up	Points	Singles Champion	Doubles Champions
1946; Details	Evanston, Illinois		USC	9	William & Mary	6	Bob Falkenburg (USC)	Bob Falkenburg / Tom Falkenberg (USC)
1947; Details	Los Angeles	—	William & Mary	10	Rice	4	Gardner Larned (William & Mary)	Sam Match / Bob Curtis (Rice)
1948; Details	Los Angeles	—	William & Mary	6	San Francisco	5	Harry Likas (San Francisco)	Fred Kovaleski / Bernard Bartzen (William & Mary)
1949; Details	Austin, Texas	—	San Francisco	7	Rollins; Tulane; Washington	4	Jack Tuero (Tulane)	James Brink / Fred Fisher (Washington)
1950; Details	Austin, Texas	—	UCLA	11	California; USC	5	Herbert Flam (UCLA)	Herbert Flam / Gene Garrett (UCLA)
1951; Details	Evanston, Illinois	Vandy Christie Tennis Center	USC	9	Cincinnati	7	Tony Trabert (Cincinnati)	Earl Cochell / Hugh Stewart (USC)
1952; Details	Evanston, Illinois	Vandy Christie Tennis Center	UCLA	11	California; USC	5	Hugh Stewart (USC)	Clifton Mayne / Hugh Ditzler (California)
1953; Details	Syracuse, New York	Drumlins Country Club	UCLA	11	California	6	Ham Richardson (Tulane)	Robert Perry / Lawrence Huebner (UCLA)
1954; Details	Seattle, WA	—	UCLA	15	USC	10	Ham Richardson (Tulane)	Robert Perry / Ronald Livingston (UCLA)
1955; Details	Chapel Hill, North Carolina	—	USC	12	Texas	7	José Agüero (Tulane)	Francisco Contreras / Joaquín Reyes (USC)
1956; Details	Kalamazoo, Michigan	Stowe Tennis Stadium	UCLA	15	USC	14	Alex Olmedo (USC)	Alex Olmedo / Francisco Contreras (USC)
1957; Details	Salt Lake City	Eccles Tennis Center	Michigan	10	Tulane	9	Barry MacKay (Michigan)	Crawford Henry / Ronald Holmberg (Tulane)
1958; Details	Annapolis, Maryland	—	USC	13	Stanford	9	Alex Olmedo (USC)	Alex Olmedo / Edward Atkinson (USC)
1959; Details	Evanston, Illinois	—	Notre Dame; Tulane	8	—	–	Whitney Reed (San José State)	Crawford Henry / Ronald Holmberg (Tulane)
1960; Details	Seattle, WA	—	UCLA	18	USC	8	Larry Nagler (UCLA)	Larry Nagler / Allen Fox (UCLA)
1961; Details	Ames, Iowa	Forker Tennis Courts	UCLA	17	USC	16	Allen Fox (UCLA)	Rafael Osuna / Ramsey Earnhart (USC)
1962; Details	Stanford, California	Taube Tennis Center	USC	22	UCLA	12	Rafael Osuna (USC)	Rafael Osuna / Ramsey Earnhart (USC)
1963; Details	Princeton, New Jersey	Lenz Tennis Center	USC	27	UCLA	19	Dennis Ralston (USC)	Rafael Osuna / Dennis Ralston (USC)
1964; Details	East Lansing, Michigan	—	USC	26	UCLA	25	Dennis Ralston (USC)	Dennis Ralston / William Bond (USC)
1965; Details	Los Angeles	—	UCLA	31	Miami (FL)	13	Arthur Ashe (UCLA)	Ian Crookenden / Arthur Ashe (UCLA)
1966; Details	Miami	Neil Schiff Tennis Center	USC	27	UCLA	23	Charlie Pasarell (UCLA)	Ian Crookenden / Charlie Pasarell (UCLA)
1967; Details	Carbondale, Illinois	SIU Courts	USC	28	UCLA	23	Bob Lutz (USC)	Stan Smith / Bob Lutz (USC)
1968; Details	San Antonio, Texas	—	USC	31	Rice	23	Stan Smith (USC)	Stan Smith / Bob Lutz (USC)
1969; Details	Princeton, New Jersey	Lenz Tennis Center	USC	35	UCLA	23	Joaquín Loyo-Mayo (USC)	Joaquín Loyo-Mayo / Marcello Lara (USC)
1970; Details	Salt Lake City	Eccles Tennis Center	UCLA	26	Rice; Trinity (TX)	22	Jeff Borowiak (UCLA)	Pat Cramer / Luis García (Miami–FL)
1971; Details	South Bend, Indiana	Courtney Tennis Center	UCLA	35	Trinity (TX)	27	Jimmy Connors (UCLA)	Haroon Rahim / Jeff Borowiak (UCLA)
1972; Details	Athens, GA	—	Trinity (TX)	36	Stanford	30	Dick Stockton (Trinity–TX)	Alex Mayer / Roscoe Tanner (Stanford)
1973; Details	Princeton, New Jersey	Lenz Tennis Center	Stanford	33	USC	28	Alex Mayer (Stanford)	Alex Mayer / Jim Delaney (Stanford)
1974; Details	Los Angeles	David X. Marks Tennis Stadium	Stanford	30	USC	25	John Whitlinger (Stanford)	John Whitlinger / Jim Delaney (Stanford)
1975; Details	Edinburg, Texas	H.E.B. Tennis Center, Corpus Christi, Texas	UCLA	27	Miami (FL)	20	Billy Martin (UCLA)	Butch Walts / Bruce Manson (USC)
1976; Details	Edinburg, Texas	H.E.B. Tennis Center, Corpus Christi, Texas	USC; UCLA	21	—	–	Bill Scanlon (Trinity–TX)	Peter Fleming / Ferdi Taygan (UCLA)

=== Singles, Doubles, and Team–Bracket Championships (1977–present) ===
NCAA Division I Men's Tennis Championship
Year	Site	Court	Team Championship			Singles Champion	Doubles Champions
Year	Site	Court	Champion	Score	Runner-up	Singles Champion	Doubles Champions
1977; Details	Athens, GA	Dan Magill Tennis Complex	Stanford	5–4	Trinity (TX)	Matt Mitchell (Stanford)	Bruce Manson / Chris Lewis (USC)
1978; Details	Athens, GA	Dan Magill Tennis Complex	Stanford	6–3	UCLA	John McEnroe (Stanford)	John Austin / Bruce Nichols (UCLA)
1979; Details	Athens, GA	Dan Magill Tennis Complex	UCLA	5–3	Trinity (TX)	Kevin Curren (Texas)	Erick Iskersky / Ben McKown (Trinity–TX)
1980; Details	Athens, GA	Dan Magill Tennis Complex	Stanford	5–3	California	Robert Van't Hof (USC)	Mel Purcell / Rodney Harmon (Tennessee)
1981; Details	Athens, GA	Dan Magill Tennis Complex	Stanford	5–1	UCLA	Tim Mayotte (Stanford)	David Pate / Karl Richter (TCU)
1982; Details	Athens, GA	Dan Magill Tennis Complex	UCLA	5–1	Pepperdine	Mike Leach (Michigan)	Peter Doohan / Pat Serret (Arkansas)
1983; Details	Athens, GA	Dan Magill Tennis Complex	Stanford	5–4	SMU	Greg Holmes (Utah)	Allen Miller / Ola Malmqvist (Georgia)
1984; Details	Athens, GA	Dan Magill Tennis Complex	UCLA	5–4	Stanford	Mikael Pernfors (Georgia)	Kelly Jones / Jerome Jones (Pepperdine)
1985; Details	Athens, GA	Dan Magill Tennis Complex	Georgia	5–1	UCLA	Mikael Pernfors (Georgia)	Kelly Jones / Carlos di Laura (Pepperdine)
1986; Details	Athens, GA	Dan Magill Tennis Complex	Stanford	5–2	Pepperdine	Dan Goldie (Stanford)	Rick Leach / Tim Pawsat (USC)
1987; Details	Athens, GA	Dan Magill Tennis Complex	Georgia	5–1	UCLA	Andrew Burrow (Miami–FL)	Rick Leach / Scott Melville (USC)
1988; Details	Athens, GA	Dan Magill Tennis Complex	Stanford	5–2	LSU	Robbie Weiss (Pepperdine)	Patrick Galbraith / Brian Garrow (UCLA)
1989; Details	Athens, GA	Dan Magill Tennis Complex	Stanford	5–3	Georgia	Donni Leaycraft (LSU)	Eric Amend / Byron Black (USC)
1990; Details	Indian Wells, California	Hyatt Grand Champions Resort	Stanford	5–2	Tennessee	Steve Bryan (Texas)	Doug Eisenman / Matt Lucena (California)
1991; Details	Athens, GA	Dan Magill Tennis Complex	USC	5–2	Georgia	Jared Palmer (Stanford)	Matt Lucena / Bent-Ove Pedersen (California)
1992; Details	Athens, GA	Dan Magill Tennis Complex	Stanford	5–0	Notre Dame	Alex O'Brien (Stanford)	Chris Cocotos / Alex O'Brien (Stanford)
1993; Details	Athens, GA	Dan Magill Tennis Complex	USC	5–3	Georgia	Chris Woodruff (Tennessee)	David Blair / Mark Merklein (Florida)
1994; Details	South Bend, Indiana	Courtney Tennis Center	USC	4–3	Stanford	Mark Merklein (Florida)	Laurent Miquelard / Joc Simmons (Mississippi State)
1995; Details	Athens, GA	Dan Magill Tennis Complex	Stanford	4–0	Mississippi	Sargis Sargsian (Arizona State)	Mahesh Bhupathi / Ali Hamadeh (Ole Miss)
1996; Details	Athens, GA	Dan Magill Tennis Complex	Stanford	4–1	UCLA	Cecil Mamiit (USC)	Justin Gimelstob / Srđan Muškatirović (UCLA)
1997; Details	Los Angeles	Los Angeles Tennis Center	Stanford	4–0	Georgia	Luke Smith (UNLV)	Luke Smith / Tim Blenkiron (UNLV)
1998; Details	Athens, GA	Dan Magill Tennis Complex	Stanford	4–0	Georgia	Bob Bryan (Stanford)	Bob Bryan / Mike Bryan (Stanford)
1999; Details	Athens, GA	Dan Magill Tennis Complex	Georgia	4–3	UCLA	Jeff Morrison (Florida)	K. J. Hippensteel / Ryan Wolters (Stanford)
2000; Details	Athens, GA	Dan Magill Tennis Complex	Stanford	4–0	VCU	Alex Kim (Stanford)	Cary Franklin / Graydon Oliver (Illinois)
2001; Details	Athens, GA	Dan Magill Tennis Complex	Georgia	4–1	Tennessee	Matías Boeker (Georgia)	Matías Boeker / Travis Parrott (Georgia)
2002; Details	College Station, Texas	Mitchell Tennis Center	USC	4–1	Georgia	Matías Boeker (Georgia)	Andrew Colombo / Mark Kovacs (Auburn)
2003; Details	Athens, GA	Dan Magill Tennis Complex	Illinois	4–3	Vanderbilt	Amer Delić (Illinois)	Rajeev Ram / Brian Wilson (Illinois)
2004; Details	Tulsa, Oklahoma	Michael D. Case Tennis Center	Baylor	4–0	UCLA	Benjamin Becker (Baylor)	Sam Warburg / KC Corkery (Stanford)
2005; Details	College Station, Texas	Mitchell Tennis Center	UCLA	4–3	Baylor	Benedikt Dorsch (Baylor)	John Isner / Antonio Ruiz (Georgia)
2006; Details	Stanford, California	Taube Tennis Center	Pepperdine	4–2	Georgia	Benjamin Kohllöffel (UCLA)	Kevin Anderson / Ryan Rowe (Illinois)
2007; Details	Athens, GA	Dan Magill Tennis Complex	Georgia	4–0	Illinois	Somdev Devvarman (Virginia)	Marco Born / Andreas Siljeström (Middle Tennessee)
2008; Details	Tulsa, Oklahoma	Michael D. Case Tennis Center	Georgia	4–2	Texas	Somdev Devvarman (Virginia)	Robert Farah / Kaes Van't Hof (USC)
2009; Details	College Station, Texas	Mitchell Tennis Center	USC	4–1	Ohio State	Devin Britton (Ole Miss)	Dominic Inglot / Michael Shabaz (Virginia)
2010; Details	Athens, GA	Dan Magill Tennis Complex	USC	4–2	Tennessee	Bradley Klahn (Stanford)	Drew Courtney / Michael Shabaz (Virginia)
2011; Details	Stanford, California	Taube Tennis Center	USC	4–3	Virginia	Steve Johnson (USC)	Jeff Dadamo / Austin Krajicek (Texas A&M)
2012; Details	Athens, GA	Dan Magill Tennis Complex	USC	4–2	Virginia	Steve Johnson (USC)	Chase Buchanan / Blaž Rola (Ohio State)
2013; Details	Urbana, Illinois	Atkins Tennis Center	Virginia	4–3	UCLA	Blaž Rola (Ohio State)	Jarmere Jenkins / Mac Styslinger (Virginia)
2014; Details	Athens, GA	Dan Magill Tennis Complex	USC	4–2	Oklahoma	Marcos Giron (UCLA)	Miķelis Lībietis / Hunter Reese (Tennessee)
2015; Details	Waco, Texas	Hurd Tennis Center	Virginia	4–1	Oklahoma	Ryan Shane (Virginia)	Søren Hess-Olesen / Lloyd Glasspool (Texas)
2016; Details	Tulsa, Oklahoma	Michael D. Case Tennis Center	Virginia	4–1	Oklahoma	Mackenzie McDonald (UCLA)	Mackenzie McDonald / Martin Redlicki (UCLA)
2017; Details	Athens, GA	Dan Magill Tennis Complex	Virginia	4–2	North Carolina	Thai-Son Kwiatkowski (Virginia)	Andrew Harris / Spencer Papa (Oklahoma)
2018; Details	Winston-Salem, North Carolina	Wake Forest Tennis Complex	Wake Forest	4–2	Ohio State	Petros Chrysochos (Wake Forest)	Martin Redlicki / Evan Zhu (UCLA)
2019; Details	Orlando, Florida	USTA National Campus, Collegiate Center	Texas	4–1	Wake Forest	Paul Jubb (South Carolina)	Maxime Cressy / Keegan Smith (UCLA)
2020			Cancelled due to the coronavirus pandemic				
2021; Details	Orlando, Florida	USTA National Campus, Collegiate Center	Florida	4–1	Baylor	Sam Riffice (Florida)	Patrick Harper / Adam Walton (Tennessee)
2022; Details	Urbana, Illinois	Atkins Tennis Center	Virginia	4–0	Kentucky	Ben Shelton (Florida)	Richard Ciamarra / Cleeve Harper (Texas)
2023; Details	Orlando, Florida	USTA National Campus, Collegiate Center	Virginia	4–0	Ohio State	Ethan Quinn (Georgia)	Andrew Lutschaunig / James Trotter (Ohio State)
2024; Details	Stillwater, Oklahoma	Greenwood Tennis Center	TCU	4–3	Texas	Filip Planinšek (Alabama)	Robert Cash / JJ Tracy (Ohio State)
2024 (Fall); Details	Waco, Texas	Hurd Tennis Center	—			Michael Zheng (Columbia)	Pedro Vives / Lui Maxted (TCU)
2025 (Spring); Details	Waco, Texas	Hurd Tennis Center	Wake Forest	4–2	TCU	—	
2025 (Fall); Details	Orlando, Florida	USTA National Campus	—			Michael Zheng (Columbia) (2)	Mans Dahlberg / Dylan Dietrich (Virginia)
2026 (Spring); Details	Athens, Georgia	Dan Magill Tennis Complex	Virginia	4–3	Texas	—	

- The NCAA was founded in 1906, but the first NCAA-sponsored championship would not be held until 1946.
- Before 1977, individual wins counted in the team's total points. In 1977, a dual-match, single-elimination team championship was initiated, eliminating the points system.
- Starting in 2024, individual tournaments for singles/doubles were held in the fall, with team championships in the spring.

== Team titles ==
Team	#	Years
USC	21	1946, 1951, 1955, 1958, 1962, 1963, 1964, 1966, 1967, 1968, 1969, 1976, 1991, 1993, 1994, 2002, 2009, 2010, 2011, 2012, 2014
Stanford	17	1973, 1974, 1977, 1978, 1980, 1981, 1983, 1986, 1988, 1989, 1990, 1992, 1995, 1996, 1997, 1998, 2000
UCLA	16	1950, 1952, 1953, 1954, 1956, 1960, 1961, 1965, 1970, 1971, 1975, 1976, 1979, 1982, 1984, 2005
Virginia	7	2013, 2015, 2016, 2017, 2022, 2023, 2026
Georgia	6	1985, 1987, 1999, 2001, 2007, 2008
William & Mary	2	1947, 1948
Wake Forest	2	2018, 2025
Baylor	1	2004
Florida	1	2021
Illinois	1	2003
Michigan	1	1957
Notre Dame	1	1959
Pepperdine	1	2006
San Francisco	1	1949
TCU	1	2024
Texas	1	2019
Trinity (TX)	1	1972
Tulane	1	1959

== Appearances by team ==
Before 1977, there was no separate team tournament. The national championship was determined by adding up results in the singles and doubles tournaments. Because detailed year-by-year results are not currently available (for example, the NCAA Men's Tennis Record Book only shows results for 1977 to present ), this table shows results only from the team brackets from 1977 to present.

Total columns

- School refers to the current name and branding of the tennis team.
- Conference shows where the school as of the 2025 season.
- # Total appearances in the NCAA Tournament since 1977, not counting vacated appearances.
- 16 Total appearances in the top 16 of the tournament
- QF Total appearances in the quarterfinals
- SF Total appearances in the semifinals
- RU Total appearances in the championship match
- CH National championships

Table entries

- CH National champion
- RU National runner-up
- SF Semifinals
- QF Quarterfinals
- 16 Round of 16
- 32 Round of 32 (1999 to present)
  - 20 Round of 20 (1987 to 1993)
- ✖ Round of 64 (1999 to present)
- From 1996 to 1998, eight teams were selected to advance directly to the round of 16, while all other teams were placed into regional tournaments to determine the other eight teams.
  - Rf Regional finals
  - Rs Regional semifinals
  - Rq Regional quarterfinals
- ~~16~~ ~~✖~~ South Alabama's participation in the 2001 and 2002 tournaments was vacated by the NCAA. They are not credited for those years in the total columns.

From 1996 to 1998, the eight teams who advanced directly to the round of 16 are marked with an ^{x}. Since 1999, the top 16 teams have been seeded 1 through 16, and the seeds are marked in superscript.

School	Conference	#	16	QF	SF	CM	CH	77	78	79	80	81	82	83	84	85	86	87	88	89	90	91	92	93	94	95	96	97	98	99	00	01	02	03	04	05	06	07	08	09	10	11	12	13	14	15	16	17	18	19	21	22	23	24	25	26
Stanford	ACC	46	38	28	21	17	15	CH	CH	SF	CH	CH		CH	RU	QF	CH		CH	CH	CH	SF	CH	QF	RU	CH	^{x}CH	^{x}CH	^{x}CH	^{2}16	^{1}CH	^{1}QF	^{5}32	^{5}SF	^{10}QF	32	^{13}QF		32	^{9}16	^{8}16	^{8}QF	^{11}QF	✖	✖	32	16	^{16}16	^{4}32	^{12}16	32	16	16	16	^{4}SF	16
USC	Big Ten	47	42	30	19	9	9	QF	SF	QF	SF	SF	16	SF	QF	SF	QF	SF	SF	16	SF	CH	SF	CH	CH	16	^{x}QF	Rf	^{x}16	^{12}32	16	16	^{11}CH	32	^{2}SF	32		^{12}QF	^{6}QF	^{8}CH	^{5}CH	^{2}CH	^{1}CH	^{4}QF	^{1}CH	^{7}QF	^{10}16	^{4}16	^{10}QF	^{8}16	^{12}QF	^{13}16	^{10}16		16	32
Virginia	ACC	27	21	19	13	9	7																					Rq	Rf	✖	✖	✖			^{6}16	^{2}QF	^{8}QF	^{4}SF	^{1}SF	^{1}QF	^{1}SF	^{1}RU	^{3}RU	^{2}CH	^{4}SF	^{3}CH	^{1}CH	^{2}CH	32	^{5}QF	^{5}16	^{7}CH	^{5}CH	^{3}QF	^{7}QF	^{4}CH
Georgia	SEC	47	40	33	23	13	6	16		16	16	SF	SF		SF	CH	16	CH	QF	RU	QF	RU	QF	RU	QF	SF	^{x}SF	^{x}RU	^{x}RU	^{10}CH	32	^{3}CH	^{1}RU	✖	^{9}16	^{6}QF	^{1}RU	^{1}CH	^{4}CH	^{4}QF	^{11}SF	^{6}SF	^{2}QF	^{3}SF	^{10}16	^{8}QF	^{7}SF	^{13}SF	✖	32	^{11}QF	^{11}32	^{6}QF	✖	32	^{12}16
UCLA	Big Ten	48	44	40	27	12	4	SF	RU	CH	QF	RU	CH	QF	CH	RU	SF	RU	16	QF	SF	QF	SF	SF	SF	SF	^{x}RU	^{x}SF	QF	^{1}RU	^{2}QF	^{2}QF	^{4}SF	^{6}SF	^{4}RU	^{7}CH	^{10}QF	^{9}QF	^{3}SF	^{7}SF	^{9}QF	^{12}16	^{4}SF	^{1}RU	^{6}SF	^{16}16	^{3}QF	^{5}QF	^{2}SF	^{11}16	✖		✖	32	QF	32
Wake Forest	ACC	25	11	6	5	3	2																						Rq			✖	✖	32	✖	32	32	^{13}16	✖	16	32	32		✖	32	^{12}16	^{6}16	^{1}QF	^{1}CH	^{4}RU	^{10}32	^{9}16	32	^{6}SF	^{1}CH	^{1}SF
Texas	SEC	43	37	18	10	4	1	QF		16				16	16	QF	QF	16	16		QF		16	SF	QF	16	16	QF	^{x}16	^{7}16	^{15}16	32	^{15}16	^{14}16	32	32	^{3}SF	^{11}16	^{7}RU	^{12}SF	^{3}16	^{13}32	✖	32	^{9}QF	^{9}16	16	^{10}QF	^{11}16	^{2}CH	^{4}SF	^{12}16	^{1}SF	^{2}RU	^{3}SF	^{2}RU
Pepperdine	West Coast	40	25	18	7	3	1		QF	QF	SF	QF	RU	SF	SF	QF	RU	QF	QF		16	16	16	20		QF	16	Rf	QF	32	^{3}32	^{16}16	^{8}QF	32	32	^{8}QF	^{2}CH	32	^{13}16	32	32		^{7}SF	^{11}QF		32					32	32	32	✖	32	16
Baylor	Big 12	28	21	16	6	3	1																						Rq	^{15}QF	^{8}16	✖	^{6}16	^{2}QF	^{3}CH	^{1}RU	^{5}SF	^{3}SF	^{9}QF	^{6}QF	^{7}QF	^{5}QF	16	^{13}16	^{5}QF	^{2}SF	32	^{7}16	32	^{6}QF	^{2}RU	^{3}QF	✖	✖	32	^{10}QF
TCU	Big 12	36	24	16	8	2	1	16					QF					16	20	SF		16	16	16	QF	QF	^{x}SF	Rf	Rs	32	^{9}QF	^{5}SF	✖	32	16	✖	32		✖	✖	✖			✖		^{5}SF	^{4}16	^{6}QF	^{9}16	^{10}QF	^{7}QF	^{1}QF	^{2}SF	^{4}CH	^{2}RU	^{6}SF
Illinois	Big Ten	29	19	7	3	2	1																				Rq	Rs	^{x}16	^{3}QF	^{6}QF	^{10}32	^{3}QF	^{1}CH	^{1}SF	^{5}16	^{7}16	^{10}RU	^{15}16	^{13}16	^{13}32	16	^{16}16	32	^{12}16	^{4}16	^{15}32	16	^{8}QF	^{15}32	^{16}16		✖	32	✖	^{14}16
Florida	SEC	35	25	10	4	1	1															QF	16	16	16	16	Rf	16	Rs	^{8}QF	^{4}SF	✖	^{13}16	^{3}QF	^{7}16	^{4}SF	16	16	^{10}16	^{10}32	^{6}16	^{7}16	^{12}16	^{15}✖	^{14}16	✖	^{9}QF	^{15}16	^{13}QF	^{3}SF	^{1}CH	^{2}QF	✖	✖	32	32
Ohio State	Big Ten	26	22	18	8	3	-																								32	32	✖	16	QF	32	^{6}QF	^{2}QF	^{2}QF	^{3}RU	^{4}QF	^{4}SF	^{5}QF	^{5}SF	^{3}QF	^{11}16	^{5}QF	^{3}SF	^{3}RU	^{1}QF	16	^{4}SF	^{3}RU	^{1}SF	^{5}16	^{3}QF
Tennessee	SEC	33	23	11	8	3	-			16	16							SF	16	20	RU	16		16			Rq	Rq	Rs	^{11}32	^{10}SF	^{8}RU	^{2}SF		^{15}32	^{10}16		32	^{8}16	^{5}16	^{2}RU	^{3}QF	32	^{7}QF	16	✖			32	^{14}16	^{3}SF	^{6}SF	^{8}16	^{7}QF	^{14}16	
Oklahoma	SEC	21	9	4	3	3	-	16																				Rq	Rq							✖		32			QF	✖	^{10}32	^{14}16	^{2}RU	^{1}RU	^{11}RU	^{14}16	^{14}32	16	32	32	32	^{11}32	32	^{9}16
Trinity (TX)	D3	7	7	7	2	2	-	RU	QF	RU	QF		QF	QF	QF																																									
SMU	ACC	27	15	9	8	1	-	SF	SF	SF		16	SF	RU	QF	SF	SF	16										Rs	16	^{9}16	^{12}16	^{7}SF	✖	✖	32	✖	✖		✖								16	✖				✖	✖	✖		32
Ole Miss	SEC	32	17	9	4	1	-													20			16		16	RU	^{x}QF	^{x}SF	^{x}QF	^{6}SF	^{14}32	^{12}32	^{9}16	^{9}QF	^{8}32	^{3}SF	^{14}16	^{7}16	^{5}QF	^{2}QF	32	32	^{13}16	^{6}32	32	^{14}32	32	32	16	✖	^{15}16	✖	32			✖
California	ACC	40	24	11	3	1	-	QF	QF	QF	RU	QF	QF	16			16	16	16	QF	QF	SF				16	Rq	Rq	16		✖	^{14}16	^{10}32	^{4}QF	32	32	32	✖	32	✖	32	^{14}16	^{14}16	16	16	32	^{13}SF	^{8}16	32	16			32		^{11}32	32
LSU	SEC	36	20	7	3	1	-		16						16	16	16	QF	RU	QF	16	QF	QF	16		16	16	^{x}16	^{x}SF	^{5}SF	^{11}16	^{13}16	32	✖	^{14}32	^{11}16	✖	^{15}16	32	32		32	32	32		32	32				✖	32	✖	✖		^{7}32
North Carolina	ACC	31	16	6	2	1	-	16	16														QF	16			Rf	Rq	Rs		32	✖	✖	✖	^{11}32	✖	^{11}16	^{6}32	^{12}16	32	32	^{16}32	^{15}16		^{7}QF	^{13}QF	^{2}QF	^{9}RU	^{7}16	^{9}SF	^{6}16	^{15}16	^{16}16	✖		✖
Kentucky	SEC	33	15	7	1	1	-											20	QF	16		16	QF				Rq	^{x}16	Rq	^{13}16	✖	32	^{7}QF	^{13}32	^{12}32	^{12}32	✖		✖	^{11}32	^{12}16	^{10}QF	^{6}16	^{8}16	^{15}16		✖	32	32	32	^{14}32	^{8}RU	^{4}QF	^{5}QF	32	✖
Notre Dame	ACC	29	8	2	1	1	-															16	RU	QF	16		Rq	Rs	Rq	✖	32	32	^{14}16		✖	✖	16	^{5}16	✖	✖	✖	32	32	✖	^{13}16	✖	✖		32	✖	32	✖				✖
Vanderbilt	SEC	19	3	2	1	1	-																							32		32	32	^{7}RU	QF	32		32	32		✖	✖	✖	^{16}16	32	32	✖		32	32				✖		32
VCU	Atlantic 10	26	1	1	1	1	-																	20			Rs	Rs	Rs	✖	RU	✖	32	✖	^{13}32	32	^{12}32	✖	✖		✖	✖	32	✖				✖	✖	✖	✖	32	✖	32	✖	
Mississippi State	SEC	30	19	8	2	-	-															16	16	16	SF	QF	^{x}QF	^{x}QF	^{x}SF	16	32	16	32	✖	32	✖						32	^{9}32	^{10}16	32	32	16	32	^{6}QF	^{7}16	16	✖	^{15}16	^{16}16	^{12}QF	^{5}QF
Texas A&M	SEC	32	18	4	1	-	-									16									16		Rs	Rq	Rf	32	^{7}16	^{4}QF	^{16}16	^{10}16	16	^{16}16	^{16}32	32	32	^{15}16	^{10}16	^{9}16	32	^{12}16	^{8}32	^{6}QF	^{12}32	^{12}16	^{5}SF	^{13}32	^{8}QF	32	32	^{15}16	^{16}16	32
Michigan	Big Ten	34	13	3	1	-	-	16		16	16	16	16	16		16		16	SF								Rs		Rq	✖	32	✖	✖				✖	32	^{16}16	32	32	✖	32	✖	✖		32	32	^{15}16	32	✖	^{5}QF	^{7}QF	32	✖	✖
South Carolina	SEC	29	13	2	1	-	-		16									16		SF	16	16					Rs	Rf	16	32	32	✖	32	✖	✖	16	✖			✖			✖	✖	32			32	32	32	^{13}16	^{10}16	^{9}QF	16	^{13}16	^{13}16
Duke	ACC	33	21	8	-	-	-						16										16	QF	QF	16	16	QF	Rf	^{4}QF	^{5}QF	^{6}QF	16	^{8}16	^{5}32	^{9}16	^{4}16	^{14}32	32	32	^{16}16	^{11}16	^{8}QF	^{9}QF	^{11}32	^{10}16		✖	✖		✖	32	^{12}16	^{13}16	32	✖
Clemson	ACC	26	12	7	-	-	-			16	QF	QF	QF	QF	16	QF	QF	16	16	16			20				Rs	Rs	Rq	32	32			32	QF	32	32	32						32	32										32	32
Arkansas	SEC	20	9	4	-	-	-			16	QF	QF	16	QF	16	16	QF											Rs	Rs			32	32	✖	16		32										32	✖			✖			✖		✖
Miami (FL)	ACC	29	14	3	-	-	-	QF			16	16	16	16		16	16	QF		16	QF	16	20					Rs	Rs	✖	✖	^{11}16	✖	✖			^{9}16	✖	32	16		32							32	✖	✖	32			✖	
Auburn	SEC	25	5	3	-	-	-					16			QF												Rf	16	QF		32	32	^{12}QF	32	✖	32	✖	32	32	32	32	32	32	✖	✖							32	✖	32	32	32
Columbia	Ivy League	19	7	2	-	-	-								16			20											Rq		✖							✖		✖	✖		✖		^{16}16	16	✖	32	^{16}16	^{16}16		32	^{13}32	^{8}QF	^{8}QF	32
Arizona State	Big 12	21	6	2	-	-	-		QF										16		16	QF				16	Rf	Rs	Rs	^{14}16		✖	✖	✖	32				✖										✖	32	32		32	32	✖	✖
UC Irvine	Big West	13	5	2	-	-	-							16				16	QF	QF	16						Rq	Rq								✖					✖	✖										✖		✖	✖	
Florida State	ACC	24	5	1	-	-	-																				Rf	Rq	Rq					32	✖	QF	32	^{16}32	^{14}16	^{16}16	32	✖	32	✖	✖	32	✖	32	^{12}32	32		16	32	^{10}16	32	
Alabama	SEC	22	5	1	-	-	-													16	20			QF			Rs	Rf	Rf	^{16}32		✖	✖	^{15}16	✖		✖	16	✖	^{14}32	✖			✖					16	✖	✖			32	✖	
Arizona	Big 12	15	5	1	-	-	-																				Rq		Rq			✖		✖	32		✖			32	✖									✖	16	32	^{14}16	^{9}16	^{10}16	^{8}QF
Fresno State	defunct	14	5	1	-	-	-																		16	16	^{x}QF	16	Rq	16	^{13}32	32		32	✖						32	32	✖							✖						
Princeton	Ivy League	12	5	1	-	-	-	16	16	QF	16														16		Rs		Rq																	✖						✖		✖	32	✖
NC State	ACC	16	4	1	-	-	-		16																					✖							✖	QF					✖	32	32	✖			✖	32	32	16	✖	^{14}32	^{9}16	32
Boise State	Pac-12	19	2	1	-	-	-																				Rs	^{x}QF	Rs	✖	✖			32		32	32	32	✖	16	✖		✖	✖	✖	✖							✖	✖	✖	
South Alabama	Sun Belt	13	1	1	-	-	-																			QF	Rf	Rs	Rq	32	✖	~~^{9}16~~	~~✖~~	32	✖			32	32										32	32	✖					
Long Beach State	defunct	1	1	1	-	-	-											QF																																						
Harvard	Ivy League	28	12	-	-	-	-					16	16	16		16	16				20	20	16	20			16	16	16	32		✖	32	32	^{16}16				✖				32	32	32	✖			32	✖		^{14}32	^{11}16	^{12}16	32	
Oklahoma State	Big 12	26	10	-	-	-	-		16			16				16	16			16	16	20						Rs	Rf			32		16	✖	^{13}32	^{15}32	^{8}16	16	✖					32	32	^{16}16	^{11}32	✖	32	32		32	32		
Utah	Big 12	16	8	-	-	-	-	16			16	16	16	16	16		16	20		16	20						Rs	Rq																					✖	✖		32	32			
Minnesota	defunct	23	6	-	-	-	-								16		16			20							16	Rf	16	✖	^{16}16	32	32	^{11}32	✖		32	✖		32	32	✖	✖	32		32		✖	16	✖						
Washington	Big Ten	22	5	-	-	-	-																				Rq	Rs	Rf	32	✖	^{15}16	16	^{16}16	32	^{15}16	16	✖	✖	32	✖	32	32	32			✖	✖				✖			✖	
Wichita State	American	12	5	-	-	-	-			16	16		16	16	16												Rs							✖	✖						✖			✖			✖				✖					
San Diego	West Coast	20	3	-	-	-	-													16	16													✖	✖	✖	✖					32	32	32	32	✖	32	✖	32	32		32	32	32	^{6}32	^{15}16
Georgia Tech	ACC	19	3	-	-	-	-												16						16			Rq	Rq	32		32	✖	✖	✖	✖	32	✖			32	^{15}16				✖	32	32			✖			✖		
Houston	defunct	3	3	-	-	-	-		16		16	16																																												
Tulsa	American	19	2	-	-	-	-																				Rs	Rq	Rs	✖	✖		✖				32	✖	^{11}32	32	✖	16	16	32	32	32	✖					✖				✖
Northwestern	Big Ten	18	2	-	-	-	-														16						Rf	16	Rs	✖	✖		✖			✖				✖			✖	32	✖	32	^{14}32	32			32	32	32			
UCF	Big 12	9	2	-	-	-	-																											✖	✖	✖												✖		✖	^{9}32			32	^{15}16	^{16}16
BYU	Big 12	8	2	-	-	-	-			16						16			20									Rs				✖									✖	✖		✖												
Kansas	defunct	8	2	-	-	-	-											20	20			20			16		16	Rf	Rs	✖																										
Wisconsin	Big Ten	8	2	-	-	-	-		16																				Rq									32	32	✖	16							32								32
Texas Tech	Big 12	19	1	-	-	-	-																				Rq	Rq	Rq	✖						^{14}16		32	32	✖	^{14}32	32	32		✖	32	^{8}32		✖	✖	32	✖	✖			
UC Santa Barbara	Big West	19	1	-	-	-	-																				Rs	16	Rs				✖	✖			✖	✖	✖	✖				✖		✖	✖	✖	✖	32	✖		✖		✖	✖
Virginia Tech	ACC	18	1	-	-	-	-																				Rs	Rf	Rf	16	✖		32					✖	32	32	32	32	✖	32	✖	^{15}32	32		✖		✖					
South Florida	American	16	1	-	-	-	-																				Rq		Rq	32		32	32	32					✖	✖					32	16	32	32		32	32	✖			✖	
Tulane	American	15	1	-	-	-	-																					Rq	Rq	32	✖	32	✖	^{12}16	32	32											32	32	✖	✖	32		✖			
Louisville	ACC	14	1	-	-	-	-																						Rq		✖				✖	32	32			32	^{15}16	32	✖		✖	✖		32				✖	32			
Rice	American	14	1	-	-	-	-																									✖		32	16	✖	32	✖	32	✖	32	✖					✖	✖						✖	✖	
New Mexico	Mountain West	12	1	-	-	-	-															20	20	20			16	Rq	Rf	✖					✖					✖						✖					✖				✖	
Memphis	American	10	1	-	-	-	-																																				✖	16	32		✖	✖	✖		32	✖	✖	32		
Louisiana	Sun Belt	9	1	-	-	-	-												16								Rs	Rq	Rq	✖	32					✖	✖								✖											
San Diego State	Pac-12	7	1	-	-	-	-																						Rq	32	16		32	32		✖										32										
Colorado	defunct	5	1	-	-	-	-																	16			Rf	Rs	Rq								32																			
UAB	American	4	1	-	-	-	-																	16			Rs	Rs			32																									
Yale	Ivy League	2	1	-	-	-	-	16																																																✖
East Tennessee State	SoCon	21	-	-	-	-	-																							✖			✖		✖	✖		✖	32	✖	32	✖	✖	✖	✖	✖	✖	✖	✖	✖	✖	✖	✖	✖		
South Carolina State	MEAC	19	-	-	-	-	-																												✖	✖	✖		✖	✖	✖	✖	✖	✖	✖	✖	✖		✖		✖	✖	✖	✖	✖	✖
Middle Tennessee	CUSA	17	-	-	-	-	-																				Rq	Rs			✖	✖	32			✖	✖			✖		✖	✖							✖	✖	^{16}32	32	32	✖	✖
Western Michigan	MAC	15	-	-	-	-	-																							✖		✖			✖		✖	✖	✖	✖	✖		✖	✖			✖		✖	✖	✖	✖				
Drake	Summit	14	-	-	-	-	-																20														✖	✖	✖			✖	✖	32	✖	32		✖	✖	✖		✖	✖			
Navy	Patriot	13	-	-	-	-	-																							✖								✖	✖	✖	✖		✖			✖			✖	✖	✖	✖	✖			✖
Marist	Metro	12	-	-	-	-	-																							✖	✖	✖	✖	✖					✖	✖	✖	✖		✖	✖	✖										
Texas A&M–Corpus Christi	Southland	12	-	-	-	-	-																													32		✖	✖	✖		✖		✖	✖	✖				✖	✖		✖			✖
UNC Wilmington	CAA	12	-	-	-	-	-																																	✖		✖	✖	32	✖			✖	✖		✖	✖	✖	✖	✖	
Sacramento State	Big West	11	-	-	-	-	-																							✖		✖	✖	✖				✖		✖	✖	✖	✖	✖										✖		
Binghamton	NEC	11	-	-	-	-	-																											✖	✖	✖			✖	✖	✖	✖	✖	✖										✖	✖	
Denver	West Coast	11	-	-	-	-	-																																✖		✖			32	✖	✖	✖	✖			✖			✖	✖	✖
Tennessee Tech	SoCon	10	-	-	-	-	-																							✖				✖	✖		✖										✖	✖	✖	✖		✖				✖
Cleveland State	Horizon	9	-	-	-	-	-																																✖	✖	✖	✖		✖					✖	✖	✖			✖		
Alabama State	SWAC	8	-	-	-	-	-																																							✖			✖	✖		✖	✖	✖	✖	✖
Penn State	Big Ten	8	-	-	-	-	-																					Rq	Rs								✖	✖	32						32		32			32						
Oregon	Big Ten	8	-	-	-	-	-																						Rq		✖				✖										✖		32	32	32		32					
Army	Patriot	8	-	-	-	-	-																								✖	✖				✖	✖					✖			✖		✖	✖								
Oral Roberts	Summit	8	-	-	-	-	-																									✖	✖	✖	✖	✖		✖	✖		✖															
Indiana	Big Ten	7	-	-	-	-	-																					Rq		✖	32	✖							✖			✖	32													
Purdue	Big Ten	7	-	-	-	-	-																					Rq	Rs	✖	✖		32												✖			✖								
Alcorn State	SWAC	7	-	-	-	-	-																							✖	✖							✖		✖		✖	✖		✖											
Fairleigh Dickinson	NEC	7	-	-	-	-	-																							✖								✖	✖				✖	✖							✖	✖				
Georgia State	Sun Belt	7	-	-	-	-	-																							✖	✖		✖					✖						✖				✖				✖				
Kansas City	defunct	7	-	-	-	-	-																							✖	✖									✖		✖	✖	✖				✖								
Butler	Big East	7	-	-	-	-	-																										✖	✖	✖	✖	✖	✖										✖								
Radford	defunct	7	-	-	-	-	-																															✖	✖	✖		✖	✖							✖		✖				
St. John's	Big East	7	-	-	-	-	-																																						✖	✖	✖			✖			✖		✖	✖
UNLV	Mountain West	6	-	-	-	-	-																				Rs	Rs	Rs	✖								✖									✖									
Ball State	MAC	6	-	-	-	-	-																								✖		✖	✖		✖						✖			✖											
UT Arlington	ASUN	6	-	-	-	-	-																									✖		✖			✖										✖						✖	✖		
Winthrop	defunct	6	-	-	-	-	-																												✖	✖	✖				✖				✖	✖										
Quinnipiac	Metro	6	-	-	-	-	-																												✖	✖	✖				✖													✖	✖	
Bryant	Big South	6	-	-	-	-	-																																						✖	✖	✖	✖	✖	✖						
Cornell	Ivy League	6	-	-	-	-	-																																			✖						32					32	32	32	32
Idaho	Big Sky	6	-	-	-	-	-																																						✖	✖		✖	✖			✖	✖			
Monmouth	CAA	6	-	-	-	-	-																																								✖	✖	✖	✖	✖	✖				
Old Dominion	Sun Belt	6	-	-	-	-	-																															32											✖				✖	✖	✖	32
New Mexico State	CUSA	5	-	-	-	-	-																					Rq			✖															✖	✖		✖							
Hampton	CAA	5	-	-	-	-	-																							✖		✖	✖	✖				✖																		
UMBC	defunct	5	-	-	-	-	-																								✖	✖	✖	✖				✖																		
UTSA	American	5	-	-	-	-	-																										✖								✖		✖			✖							✖			
George Washington	defunct	5	-	-	-	-	-																																			✖	✖		✖	✖	✖									
Florida Gulf Coast	ASUN	5	-	-	-	-	-																																							✖		✖		✖	✖		✖			
Richmond	Atlantic 10	5	-	-	-	-	-																										✖		✖	✖	✖																			✖
Samford	SoCon	5	-	-	-	-	-																																✖			✖		✖											✖	✖
Buffalo	MAC	4	-	-	-	-	-																																							✖		✖							✖	✖
Dartmouth	Ivy League	4	-	-	-	-	-																					Rq																			✖		✖	✖						
Charleston Southern	defunct	4	-	-	-	-	-																							✖	✖	✖	✖																							
Elon	CAA	4	-	-	-	-	-																															✖							✖					✖						✖
Indiana State	defunct	4	-	-	-	-	-																							✖	32	32	32																							
William & Mary	CAA	4	-	-	-	-	-																							✖						✖		✖								✖										
Montana State	Big Sky	4	-	-	-	-	-																								✖				✖	✖	✖																			
Furman	SoCon	4	-	-	-	-	-																									✖					✖		✖	✖																
Brown	Ivy League	4	-	-	-	-	-																										✖	✖		✖	✖																			
Southern	defunct	4	-	-	-	-	-																										✖	✖	✖				✖																	
Manhattan	defunct	4	-	-	-	-	-																												✖	✖	✖	✖																		
Michigan State	Big Ten	4	-	-	-	-	-																																					✖										32	32	32
Jacksonville State	CUSA	4	-	-	-	-	-																													✖		✖		✖					✖											
Belmont	Horizon	4	-	-	-	-	-																														✖														✖		✖		✖	
Eastern Kentucky	ASUN	4	-	-	-	-	-																																		✖	✖	✖			✖										
West Virginia	defunct	3	-	-	-	-	-												20	20	20																																			
Little Rock	ASUN	3	-	-	-	-	-																				Rq		Rq		✖																									
Hofstra	CAA	3	-	-	-	-	-																							✖	✖	✖																								
Pacific	West Coast	3	-	-	-	-	-																								✖	✖			✖																					
Jackson State	SWAC	3	-	-	-	-	-																									✖															✖	✖								
American	defunct	3	-	-	-	-	-																										✖	✖	✖																					
Charleston	CAA	3	-	-	-	-	-																											✖									✖				✖									
Prairie View A&M	defunct	3	-	-	-	-	-																													✖					✖			✖												
Hawaii	Mountain West	3	-	-	-	-	-																																✖	32	✖															
Xavier	Big East	3	-	-	-	-	-																																✖	✖	✖															
Nebraska	Big Ten	3	-	-	-	-	-																																		✖	✖													✖	
Cal Poly	Big West	3	-	-	-	-	-																																			✖	✖		✖											
Green Bay	defunct	3	-	-	-	-	-																																				✖		✖	✖										
Lamar	Southland	3	-	-	-	-	-																																								✖	✖	✖							
North Florida	ASUN	3	-	-	-	-	-																																								✖		✖					✖		
Northern Arizona	Big Sky	3	-	-	-	-	-																																											✖	✖					✖
Presbyterian	Big South	3	-	-	-	-	-																																									✖			✖		✖			
DePaul	Big East	3	-	-	-	-	-																																												✖	✖		✖		
Utah State	Pac-12	3	-	-	-	-	-																																									✖	✖							✖
Florida A&M	defunct	2	-	-	-	-	-																								✖																	✖								
Florida Atlantic	American	2	-	-	-	-	-																								✖	✖																								
Murray State	defunct	2	-	-	-	-	-																									✖	✖																							
St. Bonaventure	Atlantic 10	2	-	-	-	-	-																									✖		✖																						
Charlotte	American	2	-	-	-	-	-																															✖																✖		
Sacred Heart	NEC	2	-	-	-	-	-																																	✖		✖														
Troy	Sun Belt	2	-	-	-	-	-																																		✖					✖										
Coastal Carolina	Sun Belt	2	-	-	-	-	-																																					✖			✖									
Montana	Big Sky	2	-	-	-	-	-																																						✖										✖	
Valparaiso	defunct	2	-	-	-	-	-																																								✖	✖								
Grand Canyon	Mountain West	2	-	-	-	-	-																																											✖	✖					
Abilene Christian	ASUN	2	-	-	-	-	-																																													✖			✖	
LSU New Orleans	Southland	2	-	-	-	-	-																																													✖			✖	
Toledo	MAC	2	-	-	-	-	-																																														✖	✖		
Santa Clara	West Coast	2	-	-	-	-	-																																				32													✖
Penn	Ivy League	2	-	-	-	-	-																																													✖				✖
Gardner–Webb	Big South	2	-	-	-	-	-																																																✖	✖
Louisiana–Monroe	defunct	1	-	-	-	-	-																					Rq																												
Southern Miss	Sun Belt	1	-	-	-	-	-																					Rq																												
UTEP	defunct	1	-	-	-	-	-																					Rq																												
FIU	defunct	1	-	-	-	-	-																					Rq																												
Chattanooga	SoCon	1	-	-	-	-	-																								✖																									
Hartford	D3	1	-	-	-	-	-																										✖																							
High Point	defunct	1	-	-	-	-	-																											✖																						
Missouri State	defunct	1	-	-	-	-	-																													✖																				
Stony Brook	defunct	1	-	-	-	-	-																														✖																			
Texas Southern	defunct	1	-	-	-	-	-																														✖																			
Western Illinois	defunct	1	-	-	-	-	-																														✖																			
Eastern Washington	defunct	1	-	-	-	-	-																																✖																	
Southern Illinois	defunct	1	-	-	-	-	-																																	✖																
UNC Greensboro	SoCon	1	-	-	-	-	-																																		✖															
Maryland	defunct	1	-	-	-	-	-																																			32														
Fairfield	Metro	1	-	-	-	-	-																																				✖													
Austin Peay	ASUN	1	-	-	-	-	-																																					✖												
Lehigh	Patriot	1	-	-	-	-	-																																					✖												
Weber State	Big Sky	1	-	-	-	-	-																																								✖									
Campbell	CAA	1	-	-	-	-	-																																										✖							
Marquette	Big East	1	-	-	-	-	-																																										✖							
Morgan State	MEAC	1	-	-	-	-	-																																											✖						
Alabama A&M	SWAC	1	-	-	-	-	-																																												✖					
Liberty	CUSA	1	-	-	-	-	-																																													✖				
Nevada	Mountain West	1	-	-	-	-	-																																													✖				
Youngstown State	Horizon	1	-	-	-	-	-																																													✖				
Siena	Metro	1	-	-	-	-	-																																														✖			
St. Francis Brooklyn	defunct	1	-	-	-	-	-																																														✖			
Boston University	Patriot	1	-	-	-	-	-																																															✖		
NJIT	Big South	1	-	-	-	-	-																																															✖		
UNC Asheville	Big South	1	-	-	-	-	-																																															✖		
Bucknell	Patriot	1	-	-	-	-	-																																																✖	
North Alabama	ASUN	1	-	-	-	-	-																																																✖	
Rider	Metro	1	-	-	-	-	-																																																	✖
Stetson	ASUN	1	-	-	-	-	-																																																	✖
Wagner	NEC	1	-	-	-	-	-																																																	✖

== See also ==
- NCAA Men's Tennis Championships (Division II, Division III)
- NAIA Men's Tennis Championship
- NCAA Women's Tennis Championships (Division I, Division II, Division III)
