= 2025 NCAA Division I Men's Tennis Championships =

- Date: November 19–24, 2024; May 2–18, 2025
- Edition: 79th
- Location: Waco, Texas
- Venue: Hurd Tennis Center; Hosted by: Baylor University

Champions

Men's singles
- Michael Zheng (Columbia) (Fall 2024)

Men's doubles
- Pedro Vives and Lui Maxted (TCU) (Fall 2024)

Men's team
- Wake Forest Demon Deacons (Spring 2025)
- NCAA Division I Men's Tennis Championships

The 2025 NCAA Division I Men's Tennis Championships were the men's tennis tournaments played from November 19–24, 2024 and May 2 to May 18, 2025, at campus sites and Waco, Texas at the Hurd Tennis Center hosted by Baylor University. It was the 79th edition of the NCAA Division I Men's Tennis Championship. As part of a two-year pilot program, the men's singles and doubles championships were conducted in the fall of 2024, while the team championships were played in the spring of 2025.

== Men's team championship ==
There were 64 teams selected for the men's team championship, 28 of which were automatic qualifiers from each Division 1 conference. The remaining 36 teams were selected at-large. Teams played two rounds of single-elimination matches in groups of four on May 2-3 or 3-4 at campus sites; the winners of those regionals advanced to a super-regional round on May 9 or 10, also held at campus sites. The remaining eight teams advanced to the championship rounds in Waco, Texas on May 16-18.

=== Automatic qualifiers ===
The following 28 teams were automatic qualifiers, representing their conferences:

| Conference | Team |
|---|---|
| American | Rice |
| Atlantic 10 | VCU |
| ACC | Stanford |
| ASUN | North Alabama |
| Big East | St. John's |
| Big Sky | Montana |
| Big South | Gardner–Webb |
| Big Ten | UCLA |
| Big 12 | Arizona |
| Big West | UC Irvine |
| CAA | UNC Wilmington |
| CUSA | Middle Tennessee |
| Horizon | Belmont |
| Ivy | Columbia |
| MAAC | Quinnipiac |
| MAC | Buffalo |
| MEAC | South Carolina State |
| Mountain West | New Mexico |
| Northeast | Binghamton |
| Patriot | Bucknell |
| SEC | Texas |
| Southern | Samford |
| Southland | New Orleans |
| SWAC | Alabama State |
| Summit | Denver |
| Sun Belt | Old Dominion |
| West Coast | San Diego |
| WAC | Abilene Christian |

=== National seeds ===
Sixteen teams were selected as national seeds and were guaranteed to host for the first two rounds if they submitted a bid and met criteria.

1. Wake Forest (National Champions)
2. TCU (runner-up)
3. Texas (semifinals)
4. Stanford (semifinals)
5. Ohio State (super regionals)
6. San Diego (second round)
7. Virginia (quarterfinals)
8. Columbia (quarterfinals)
9. NC State (super regionals)
10. Arizona (super regionals)
11. California (second round)
12. Mississippi State (quarterfinals)
13. South Carolina (super regionals)
14. Tennessee (super regionals)
15. UCF (super regionals)
16. Texas A&M (super regionals)

=== Bracket ===
Bold indicates winner. Host institutions for the first two rounds and Super Regionals are marked with an asterisk (*).

**First Round**; May 2–3 or 3–4, 2025; Campus sites
1 | **Wake Forest*** | **4**
Gardner–Webb | 1
Winston-Salem, North Carolina
Old Dominion | 0
**Kentucky** | **4**
**Baylor** | **4**
Nebraska | 1
College Station, Texas
Rice | 2
16 | **Texas A&M*** | **4**
9 | **NC State*** | **4**
South Carolina State | 0
Raleigh, North Carolina
UNC Wilmington | 0
**Georgia** | **4**
**Clemson** | **4**
Quinnipiac | 0
New York City, New York
Binghamton | 0
8 | **Columbia*** | **4**
5 | **Ohio State*** | **4**
Buffalo | 0
Columbus, Ohio
Belmont | 0
**Auburn** | **4**
**Michigan State** | **4**
North Alabama | 0
Starkville, Mississippi
New Orleans | 0
12 | **Mississippi State*** | **4**
13 | **South Carolina*** | **4**
VCU | 0
Columbia, South Carolina
Samford | 0
**Florida State** | **4**
**Pepperdine** | **4**
Alabama | 3
Stanford, California
New Mexico | 0
4 | **Stanford*** | **4**
3 | **Texas*** | **4**
Montana | 0
Austin, Texas
**Cornell** | **4**
Michigan | 0
**Duke** | **4**
Middle Tennessee | 0
Knoxville, Tennessee
Alabama State | 0
14 | **Tennessee*** | **4**
11 | **California*** | **4**
Boise State | 1
Berkeley, California
UC Santa Barbara | 0
**UCLA** | **4**
**Southern California** | **4**
Arizona State | 0
San Diego, California
UC Irvine | 2
6 | **San Diego*** | **4**
7 | **Virginia*** | **4**
Bucknell | 0
Charlottesville, Virginia
St. John's | 0
**Princeton** | **4**
**Harvard** | **4**
Washington | 0
Tucson, Arizona
Denver | 0
10 | **Arizona*** | **4**
15 | **UCF*** | **4**
Miami (FL) | 1
Orlando, Florida
**Florida** | **4**
South Florida | 1
**Oklahoma** | **4**
Illinois | 0
Fort Worth, Texas
Abilene Christian | 0
2 | **TCU*** | **4**

**Second Round**; May 2–3 or 3–4, 2025; Campus sites
1 | **Wake Forest** | **4**
Kentucky | 1
Baylor | 3
16 | **Texas A&M** | **4**
9 | **NC State** | **4**
Georgia | 1
Clemson | 2
8 | **Columbia** | **4**
5 | **Ohio State** | **4**
Auburn | 1
Michigan State | 0
12 | **Mississippi State** | **4**
13 | **South Carolina** | **4**
Florida State | 3
Pepperdine | 0
4 | **Stanford** | **4**
3 | **Texas** | **4**
Cornell | 1
Duke | 3
14 | **Tennessee** | **4**
11 | California | 2
**UCLA** | **4**
**Southern California** | **4**
6 | San Diego | 2
7 | **Virginia** | **4**
Bucknell | 0
Harvard | 0
10 | **Arizona** | **4**
15 | **UCF** | **4**
Florida | 1
Oklahoma | 2
2 | **TCU** | **4**

**Super Regionals**; May 9 or 10, 2025; Campus sites
1 | **Wake Forest*** | **4**
16 | Texas A&M | 0
9 | NC State | 2
8 | **Columbia*** | **4**
5 | Ohio State* | 2
12 | **Mississippi State** | **4**
13 | South Carolina | 0
4 | **Stanford*** | **4**
3 | **Texas*** | **4**
14 | Tennessee | 0
**UCLA*** | **4**
Southern California | 2
7 | **Virginia*** | **4**
10 | Arizona | 2
15 | UCF | 0
2 | **TCU*** | **4**

**Quarterfinals**; May 16, 2025; Waco
1 | **Wake Forest** | **4**
8 | Columbia | 1
12 | Mississippi State | 3
4 | **Stanford** | **4**
3 | **Texas** | **4**
UCLA | 1
7 | Virginia | 3
2 | **TCU** | **4**

**Semifinals**; May 17, 2025; Waco
1 | **Wake Forest** | **4**
4 | Stanford | 2
3 | Texas | 2
2 | **TCU** | **4**

**Championship**; May 18, 2025; Waco
1 | **Wake Forest** | **4**
2 | TCU | 2

Bracket source:

== Men's singles championship ==
64 singles players qualified for the men's singles championship via competition in approved ITA qualifying pathway events. The tournament was played in the Fall of 2024 from November 19 to 24 in Waco, Texas.

Columbia junior Michael Zheng won the men's singles title against Michigan State junior Ozan Baris 6–2, 4–6, 6–2.

=== National seeds ===
The following sixteen players were seeded for this tournament:

1. Sebastian Gorzny (Texas)
2. Michael Zheng (Columbia) (National Champion)
3. Colton Smith (Arizona)
4. Carl Emil Overbeck (California)
5. Jay Friend (Arizona)
6. Lui Maxted (TCU)
7. Oliver Tarvet (San Diego)
8. Aidan Kim (Ohio State)

Players ranked 9th–16th, listed by last name

- Jonah Braswell (Texas)
- Corey Craig (Florida State)
- Timo Legout (Texas)
- Shunsuke Mitsui (Tennessee)
- Thomas Paulsell (Georgia)
- Braden Shick (NC State)
- Dhakshineswar Suresh (Wake Forest)
- Pedro Vives (TCU)

=== Draw ===
Bracket:

==== Finals ====
Quarterfinals
9–16 | Corey Craig (Florida State) | 3 | 2
9–16 | Dhakshineswar Suresh (Wake Forest) | 6 | 6
Ozan Baris (Michigan State) | 6 | 7
5 | Jay Friend (Arizona) | 1 | 5
Spencer Johnson (UCLA) | 3 | 2
9–16 | Timo Legout (Texas) | 6 | 6
6 | Lui Maxted (TCU) | 3 | 2
2 | Michael Zheng (Columbia) | 6 | 6

Semifinals
9–16 | Dhakshineswar Suresh (Wake Forest) | 5 | 6
Ozan Baris (Michigan State) | 7 | 7^{5}
9–16 | Timo Legout (Texas) | 1^{ret.}
2 | Michael Zheng (Columbia) | 4

Final
Ozan Baris (Michigan State) | 2 | 6 | 2
2 | Michael Zheng (Columbia) | 6 | 4 | 6

==== Section 1 ====
First round
1 | Sebastian Gorzny (Texas) | 5 | 6 | 6
Gavin Young (Michigan) | 7 | 4 | 4
Benito Sanchez Martinez (Mississippi State) | 2 | 3
Paul Inchauspe (Princeton) | 6 | 6
9–16 | Corey Craig (Florida State) | 6 | 6 | 7^{5}
Oscar Lacides (Oklahoma) | 7^{4} | 4 | 6
Alex Chang (California) | 2 | 5
Emon Van Loben Sels (UCLA) | 6 | 7
8 | Aidan Kim (Ohio State) | 6 | 6
Pedro Rodenas (Duke) | 1 | 3
Daniel Sancho Arbizu (Denver) | 6 | 6
Dylan Dietrich (Virginia) | 7^{4} | 7^{7}
9–16 | Dhakshineswar Suresh (Wake Forest) | 6 | 6
Miguel Perez Pena (Georgia) | 4 | 1
Martin Borisiouk (NC State) | 4 | 6
Devin Badenhorst (Baylor) | 6 | 7^{7}

Second round
1 | S Gorzny (Texas) | 2 | 6 | 2
P Inchauspe (Princeton) | 6 | 3 | 6
9–16 | C Craig (Florida State) | 6 | 6
E Van Loben Sels (UCLA) | 2 | 2
8 | A Kim (Ohio State) | 6 | 6 | 6
D Dietrich (Virginia) | 7^{1} | 0 | 1
9–16 | D Suresh (Wake Forest) | 6 | 6
D Badenhorst (Baylor) | 4 | 2

Third round
P Inchauspe (Princeton) | 7^{2} | 2 | 1
9–16 | C Craig (Florida State) | 6 | 6 | 6
8 | A Kim (Ohio State) | 6 | 6 | 3
9–16 | D Suresh (Wake Forest) | 4 | 7^{3} | 6

Quarterfinals
9–16 | C Craig (Florida State) | 3 | 2
9–16 | D Suresh (Wake Forest) | 6 | 6

==== Section 2 ====
First round
4 | Carl Emil Overbeck (California) | 2 | 6 | 7^{1}
Roan Jones (Alabama) | 6 | 4 | 6
Ozan Baris (Michigan State) | 6 | 6
Samir Banerjee (Stanford) | 1 | 2
9–16 | Pedro Vives (TCU) | 6 | 6
Oscar Pinto Sansano (Georgia) | 4 | 4
Noah Zamora (UC Irvine) | 6 | 6
Sebastian Dominko (Notre Dame) | 4 | 4
5 | Jay Friend (Arizona) | 7 | 6
Martin Katz (Miami (FL)) | 5 | 3
Trevor Svajda (SMU) | 6 | 1 | 6
Hugo Hashimoto (Columbia) | 2 | 6 | 4
9–16 | Shunsuke Mitsui (Tennessee) | 6 | 4 | 6
Connor Van Schalkwyk (Old Dominion) | 4 | 6 | 4
Anton Arzhankin (Western Michigan) | 3 | 1
Cesar Bouchelaghem (Washington) | 6 | 6

Second round
4 | CE Overbeck (California) | 3 | 7 | 2
O Baris (Michigan State) | 6 | 5 | 6
9–16 | P Vives (TCU) | 6 | 6
N Zamora (UC Irvine) | 4 | 4
5 | J Friend (Arizona) | 3 | 6 | 6
T Svajda (SMU) | 6 | 3 | 4
9–16 | S Mitsui (Tennessee) | 7 | 3 | 6
C Bouchelaghem (Washington) | 5 | 6 | 4

Third round
O Baris (Michigan State) | 6 | 6 | 6
9–16 | P Vives (TCU) | 7^{4} | 4 | 2
5 | J Friend (Arizona) | 7 | 6
9–16 | S Mitsui (Tennessee) | 5 | 4

Quarterfinals
O Baris (Michigan State) | 6 | 7
5 | J Friend (Arizona) | 1 | 5

==== Section 3 ====
First round
Duncan Chan (TCU) | 6 | 3 | 4
Spencer Johnson (UCLA) | 3 | 6 | 6
Petar Jovanovic (Mississippi State) | 6 | 3
9–16 | Braden Shick (NC State) | 7^{4} | 6
Kenta Miyoshi (Illinois) | 6 | 6
Jack Loutit (Kentucky) | 3 | 4
Radu Papoe (Cornell) | 2 | 6 | 6
7 | Oliver Tarvet (San Diego) | 6 | 4 | 3
Cooper Williams (Duke) | 6 | 6
Vignesh Gogineni (Yale) | 3 | 4
Timofey Stepanov (California) | 3 | 4
9–16 | Timo Legout (Texas) | 6 | 6
Aristotelis Thanos (Michigan State) | 6 | 6
Alex Kotzen (Tennessee) | 2 | 4
Youssef Kadiri (Nevada) | 4 | 3
3 | Colton Smith (Arizona) | 6 | 6

Second round
S Johnson (UCLA) | 6 | 3 | 7^{4}
9–16 | B Shick (NC State) | 1 | 6 | 6
K Miyoshi (Illinois) | 6 | 6
R Papoe (Cornell) | 3 | 4
C Williams (Duke) | 7^{6} | 4 | 1
9–16 | T Legout (Texas) | 6 | 6 | 6
A Thanos (Michigan State) | 6 | 4 | 4
3 | C Smith (Arizona) | 4 | 6 | 6

Third round
S Johnson (UCLA) | 6 | 6
K Miyoshi (Illinois) | 3 | 4
9–16 | T Legout (Texas) | 6 | 7^{4}
3 | C Smith (Arizona) | 3 | 6

Quarterfinals
S Johnson (UCLA) | 3 | 2
9–16 | T Legout (Texas) | 6 | 6

==== Section 4 ====
First round
Maxi Homberg (Pepperdine) | 6 | 6
Jordan Hasson (Oklahoma) | 3 | 4
Raffaello Papajcik (Denver) | 5 | 7^{3} | 7
9–16 | Jonah Braswell (Texas) | 7 | 6 | 5
Lucas Andrade de Silva (South Carolina) | 6 | 6 | 3
Luca Staeheli (NC State) | 7^{3} | 3 | 6
Tiago Silva (Pacific) | 6 | 3 | 2
6 | Lui Maxted (TCU) | 2 | 6 | 6
Jamie Connel (Florida State) | 6 | 6
Niccolo Baroni (Mississippi State) | 1 | 4
Theo Dean (California) | 5 | 4
9–16 | Thomas Paulsell (Georgia) | 7 | 6
Oskar Brostrom Poulsen (Baylor) | 2 | 6 | 3
Top Nidunjianzan (Princeton) | 6 | 4 | 6
Jeremy Jin (Florida) | 1 | 2
2 | Michael Zheng (Columbia) | 6 | 6

Second round
M Homberg (Pepperdine) | 6 | 6
R Papajcik (Denver) | 3 | 3
L Staeheli (NC State) | 4 | 1
6 | L Maxted (TCU) | 6 | 6
J Connel (Florida State) | 2 | 6 | 1
9–16 | T Paulsell (Georgia) | 6 | 1 | 6
T Nidunjianzan (Princeton) | 3 | 3
2 | M Zheng (Columbia) | 6 | 6

Third round
M Homberg (Pepperdine) | 2 | 5
6 | L Maxted (TCU) | 6 | 7
9–16 | T Paulsell (Georgia) | 6 | 4 | 2
2 | M Zheng (Columbia) | 2 | 6 | 6

Quarterfinals
6 | L Maxted (TCU) | 3 | 2
2 | M Zheng (Columbia) | 6 | 6

== Men's doubles championship ==
32 doubles teams qualified for the men's doubles championship, via competition in approved ITA qualifying pathway events. The tournament was played at the same time as the singles championship in the Fall of 2024 from November 19 to 24 in Waco, Texas.

Pedro Vives and Lui Maxted of TCU beat Gavin Young and Benjamin Kittay of Michigan, to win the men's double title.

=== National seeds ===
The following eight teams were seeded for this tournament:

1. Oliver Tarvet / Stian Klaassen (San Diego)
2. Marko Miladinovic / Oskar Brostrom Poulsen (Baylor)
3. Petar Jovanovic / Benito Sanchez Martinez (Mississippi State)
4. Luciano Tacchi / Luca Pow (Wake Forest)

Players ranked 5th–8th, listed by institution

- Zsombor Velcz / Devin Badenhorst (Baylor)
- Cooper Williams / Theo Winegar (Duke)
- Youcef Rihane / Alex Bulte (Florida State)
- Pedro Vives / Lui Maxted (TCU) (National Champions)

=== Draw ===
Bracket:

==== Finals ====
Semifinals
Gavin Young (Michigan); Benjamin Kittay (Michigan) | 6 | 6
5–8 | Youcef Rihane (Florida State); Alex Bulte (Florida State) | 4 | 2
5–8 | Pedro Vives (TCU); Lui Maxted (TCU) | 6 | 6
Timo Legout (Texas); Lucas Brown (Texas) | 4 | 2

Final
Gavin Young (Michigan); Benjamin Kittay (Michigan) | 3 | 7^{6} | 2
5–8 | Pedro Vives (TCU); Lui Maxted (TCU) | 6 | 6 | [10]

==== Top half ====
First round
1 | Oliver Tarvet (San Diego); Stian Klaassen (San Diego) | 6 | 7
Eric Verdes (Cornell); Rushil Kholsa (Cornell) | 4 | 5
Gavin Young (Michigan); Benjamin Kittay (Michigan) | 2 | 6 | [11]
Peter Nad (Notre Dame); Sebastian Dominko (Notre Dame) | 6 | 3 | 9
5–8 | Zsombor Velcz (Baylor); Devin Badenhorst (Baylor) | 3 | 6
Aadarsh Tripathi (UCLA); Alexander Hoogmartens (UCLA) | 6 | 7^{3}
William Nolan (Auburn); Billy Blaydes (Auburn) | 6 | 6
Nicholas Godsick (Stanford); Samir Banerjee (Stanford) | 2 | 4
4 | Luciano Tacchi (Wake Forest); Luca Pow (Wake Forest) | 6 | 6
Arthus de la Bassetiere (Rice); Kabeer Kapasi (Rice) | 2 | 4
Mario Martinez Serrano (Mississippi State); Niccolo Baroni (Mississippi State) | 1 | 6 | 5
Facundo Yunis (Indiana); Jip van Assendelft (Indiana) | 6 | 4 | [10]
5–8 | Youcef Rihane (Florida State); Alex Bulte (Florida State) | 6 | 6
Hugo Hashimoto (Columbia); Michael Zheng (Columbia) | 3 | 1
Carl Emil Overbeck (California); Theo Dean (California) | 4 | 6 | 8
Joaquim Almeida (Liberty); Siwanat Auytayakul (Liberty) | 6 | 3 | [10]

Second round
1 | O Tarvet (San Diego); S Klaassen (San Diego) | 4 | 1
G Young (Michigan); B Kittay (Michigan) | 6 | 6
A Tripathi (UCLA); A Hoogmartens (UCLA) | 4 | 6 | [10]
W Nolan (Auburn); B Blaydes (Auburn) | 6 | 3 | 6
4 | L Tacchi (Wake Forest); L Pow (Wake Forest) | 6 | 7 | [10]
F Yunis (Indiana); J van Assendelft (Indiana) | 7^{4} | 5 | 4
5–8 | Y Rihane (Florida State); A Bulte (Florida State) | 6 | 7
J Almeida (Liberty); S Auytayakul (Liberty) | 3 | 5

Quarterfinals
G Young (Michigan); B Kittay (Michigan) | adv.
A Tripathi (UCLA); A Hoogmartens (UCLA) | inj.
4 | L Tacchi (Wake Forest); L Pow (Wake Forest) | 7 | 4 | 7
5–8 | Y Rihane (Florida State); A Bulte (Florida State) | 5 | 6 | [10]

Semifinals
G Young (Michigan); B Kittay (Michigan) | 6 | 6
5–8 | Y Rihane (Florida State); A Bulte (Florida State) | 4 | 2

==== Bottom half ====
First round
Vasco Prata (Charlotte); Matias Iturbe (Charlotte) | 6 | 4 | [11]
Connor Kruger (Weber State); Minh Tuan Dinh Viet (Weber State) | 3 | 6 | 9
Dhakshineswar Suresh (Wake Forest); Ioannis Xilas (Wake Forest) | 6 | 6 | 3
5–8 | Pedro Vives (TCU); Lui Maxted (TCU) | 4 | 7^{3} | [10]
Bruno Nhavene (Oklahoma); Oscar Lacides (Oklahoma) | 4 | 6
Filippos Astreinidis (Princeton); Paul Inchauspe (Princeton) | 6 | 7^{4}
Michael Wright (California); Alex Chang (California) | 6 | 2 | 6
3 | Petar Jovanovic (Mississippi State); Benito Sanchez Martinez (Mississippi State) | 4 | 6 | [10]
Bryce Nakashima (Ohio State); William Jansen (Ohio State) | 0 | 6 | [10]
Patrick Schoen (North Carolina); Logan Zapp (North Carolina) | 6 | 3 | 7
Tanapatt Nirundorn (Florida); Henry Jefferson (Florida) | 6 | 6 | 8
5–8 | Cooper Williams (Duke); Theo Winegar (Duke) | 1 | 7^{3} | [10]
Timo Legout (Texas); Lucas Brown (Texas) | 3 | 6 | [10]
Wally Thayne (BYU); Zach Fuchs (BYU) | 6 | 4 | 8
Ondrej Horak (Middle Tennessee); Karim Al-Amin (Middle Tennessee) | 5 | 7^{3} | 8
2 | Marko Miladinovic (Baylor); Oskar Brostrom Poulsen (Baylor) | 7 | 6 | [10]

Second round
V Prata (Charlotte); M Iturbe (Charlotte) | 0 | 3
5–8 | P Vives (TCU); L Maxted (TCU) | 6 | 6
F Astreinidis (Princeton); P Inchauspe (Princeton) | 4 | 2
3 | P Jovanovic (Mississippi State); B Sanchez Martinez (Mississippi State) | 6 | 6
B Nakashima (Ohio State); W Jansen (Ohio State) | 6 | 7^{1}
5–8 | C Williams (Duke); T Winegar (Duke) | 4 | 6
T Legout (Texas); L Brown (Texas) | 6 | 6 | [10]
2 | M Miladinovic (Baylor); O Brostrom Poulsen (Baylor) | 7^{7} | 4 | 5

Quarterfinals
5–8 | P Vives (TCU); L Maxted (TCU) | 6 | 7
3 | P Jovanovic (Mississippi State); B Sanchez Martinez (Mississippi State) | 3 | 5
B Nakashima (Ohio State); W Jansen (Ohio State) | 7^{5} | 3 | 8
T Legout (Texas); L Brown (Texas) | 6 | 6 | [10]

Semifinals
5–8 | P Vives (TCU); L Maxted (TCU) | 6 | 6
T Legout (Texas); L Brown (Texas) | 4 | 2
