= 2006 NCAA Division I tennis championships =

- Edition: 60th–Men; 24th–Women
- Location: Stanford, California
- Venue: Taube Tennis Center; Stanford University

Champions

Men's singles
- (Germany) Benjamin Kohllöffel (UCLA)

Women's singles
- (United States) Suzi Babos (California)

Men's doubles
- (South Africa) Kevin Anderson / (United States) Ryan Rowe (Illinois)

Women's doubles
- (United Kingdom) Cristelle Grier / (United States) Alexis Prousis (Northwestern)

Men's team
- Pepperdine

Women's team
- Stanford
- NCAA Division I tennis championships

The 2006 NCAA Division I tennis championships were the 60th annual men's and 24th annual women's championships hosted by the NCAA to determine the individual, doubles, and team national champions of collegiate tennis among its Division I member programs in the United States, culminating the 2006 NCAA Division I tennis season.

These were the first NCAA tennis championships where the men's and women's tournaments were held concurrently at the same venue, this year hosted by Stanford University at the Taube Tennis Center in Stanford, California from May 13–23, 2006.

Pepperdine defeated Georgia in the men's championship match, 4–2, to claim the Waves' first men's team national title.

Meanwhile, three-time defending champions, and hosts, Stanford defeated Miami (FL) in the women's title match, 4–1, to claim their fifteenth team national championship.

== Brackets ==
=== Men's team ===
First round May 13–14, 2006
1	Georgia	4
Furman	0
Athens, GA
Georgia Tech	4
Alabama	2
16	Texas A&M	4
UT Arlington	0
College Station, TX
Notre Dame	4
Brown	3
8	Virginia	4
Army	0
Charlottesville, VA
Wake Forest	4
Kentucky	0
9	Miami (FL)	4
Manhattan	0
Miami, FL
LSU	2
Minnesota	4
4	Duke	4
Winthrop	0
Durham, NC
Boise State	4
NC State	2
13	Stanford	4
Quinnipiac	0
Stanford, CA
California	4
UC Santa Barbara	0
5	Baylor	4
Texas Southern	0
Waco, TX
Middle Tennessee	2
Tulsa	4
12	VCU	4
Richmond	0
Richmond, VA
Washington	4
Penn State	2
11	North Carolina	4
South Carolina State	0
Chapel Hill, NC
South Carolina	1
Clemson	4
6	Ohio State	4
Butler	0
Columbus, OH
Michigan	1
Arkansas	4
14	Ole Miss	4
Belmont	0
Oxford, MS
Auburn	0
Florida State	4
3	Texas	4
Tennessee Tech	0
Austin, TX
Louisiana–Lafayette	1
Rice	4
10	UCLA	4
Stony Brook	0
Los Angeles, CA
Arizona	1
Colorado	4
7	Illinois	4
Western Illinois	0
Champaign, IL
SMU	0
Louisville	4
15	Oklahoma State	4
Drake	0
Stillwater, OK
Western Michigan	0
Florida	4
2	Pepperdine	4
Montana State	0
Malibu, CA
San Diego	0
TCU	4

Second round May 13–14, 2006
1	Georgia	4
Georgia Tech	0
16	Texas A&M	2
Notre Dame	4
8	Virginia	4
Wake Forest	2
9	Miami (FL)	4
Minnesota	0
4	Duke	4
Boise State	2
13	Stanford	4
California	0
5	Baylor	4
Tulsa	0
12	VCU	0
Washington	4
11	North Carolina	4
Clemson	1
6	Ohio State	4
Arkansas	0
3	Ole Miss	4
Florida State	2
14	Texas	4
Rice	0
10	UCLA	4
Colorado	0
7	Illinois	4
Louisville	0
15	Oklahoma State	0
Florida	4
2	Pepperdine	4
TCU	0

Round of 16; May 20, 2006
1	Georgia	4
Notre Dame	0
8	Virginia	4
9	Miami (FL)	0
4	Duke	0
13	Stanford	4
5	Baylor	4
Washington	1
11	North Carolina	0
6	Ohio State	4
3	Ole Miss	1
14	Texas	4
10	UCLA	4
7	Illinois	2
Florida	0
2	Pepperdine	4

Quarterfinals; May 21, 2006
1	Georgia	4
8	Virginia	0
13	Stanford	3
5	Baylor	4
6	Ohio State	3
14	Texas	4
10	UCLA	1
2	Pepperdine	4

Semifinals; May 22, 2006
1	Georgia	4
5	Baylor	3
14	Texas	1
2	Pepperdine	4

Championship; May 23, 2006
1	Georgia	2
2	Pepperdine	4

=== Women's team ===
First round May 12–13, 2006
1	Stanford	4
Quinnipiac	0
Stanford, CA
BYU	0
Arizona	4
16	TCU	4
Rice	0
Fort Worth, TX
Texas	4
Arkansas	0
8	Duke	5
Winthrop	0
Durham, NC
Virginia	4
Alabama	3
9	North Carolina	4
South Carolina State	0
Chapel Hill, NC
Wake Forest	4
South Carolina	1
4	Florida	5
Samford	0
Gainesville, FL
Maryland	0
South Florida	4
13	Pepperdine	4
Wichita State	0
Malibu, CA
UCLA	4
San Diego State	0
5	Baylor	4
Texas Southern	0
Waco, TX
Arizona State	1
Texas A&M	4
12	Vanderbilt	4
East Tennessee State	0
Nashville, TN
Georgia	4
Indiana	1
11	Northwestern	4
Illinois–Chicago	2
Evanston, IL
Purdue	4
Harvard	2
6	Georgia Tech	4
SE Louisiana	0
Atlanta, GA
Penn	4
Tennessee	2
14	VCU	4
Richmond	0
Richmond, VA
NC State	4
William & Mary	3
3	USC	4
Army	0
Los Angeles, CA
New Mexico	1
Long Beach State	4
10	California	4
Western Michigan	0
Berkeley, CA
Sacramento State	1
Fresno State	4
7	Miami (FL)	4
Boston University	0
Miami, FL
FIU	4
Iowa	1
15	Clemson	4
Siena	0
Clemson, SC
Furman	0
Kentucky	4
2	Notre Dame	5
Valparaiso	0
South Bend, IN
Nebraska	3
Michigan	4

Second round May 12–13, 2006
1	Stanford	4
Arizona	0
16	TCU	4
Texas	0
8	Duke	4
Virginia	0
9	North Carolina	4
Wake Forest	3
4	Florida	4
South Florida	0
13	Pepperdine	0
UCLA	4
5	Baylor	4
Texas A&M	0
12	Vanderbilt	4
Georgia	2
11	Northwestern	4
Purdue	1
6	Georgia Tech	4
Penn	0
14	VCU	4
NC State	0
3	USC	4
Long Beach State	0
10	California	3
Fresno State	4
7	Miami (FL)	4
FIU	0
15	Clemson	0
Kentucky	4
2	Notre Dame	4
Michigan	0

Third round May 18, 2006
1	Stanford	4
16	TCU	0
8	Duke	4
9	North Carolina	1
4	Florida	4
UCLA	3
5	Baylor	4
12	Vanderbilt	2
11	Northwestern	4
6	Georgia Tech	0
14	VCU	1
3	USC	4
Fresno State	2
7	Miami (FL)	4
Kentucky	0
2	Notre Dame	4

Quarterfinals; May 19, 2006
1	Stanford	4
8	Duke	0
4	Florida	4
5	Baylor	0
11	Northwestern	3
3	USC	4
7	Miami (FL)	4
2	Notre Dame	0

Semifinals; May 21, 2006
1	Stanford	4
4	Florida	0
3	USC	1
7	Miami (FL)	4

Championship; May 22, 2006
1	Stanford	4
7	Miami (FL)	1

== See also ==
- 2006 NCAA Division II tennis championships
- 2006 NCAA Division III men's tennis championships
- 2006 NCAA Division III women's tennis championships
- 2006 NAIA tennis championships
