= 1977 NCAA Division I tennis championships =

- Date: May 1977
- Edition: 32nd
- Location: Athens, Georgia, United States
- Venue: Dan Magill Tennis Complex (University of Georgia)

Champions

Men's singles
- Matt Mitchell (Stanford)

Men's doubles
- Bruce Manson / Christopher Lewis (USC)

Men's team
- Stanford (3rd title)
← 1976 ·	NCAA Division I tennis championships	· 1978 →

The 1977 NCAA Division I Tennis Championships were the 32nd annual tournament to determine the national champion of NCAA men's college tennis. Matches were played during May 1977 at the Dan Magill Tennis Complex in Athens, Georgia on the campus of the University of Georgia. A total of three championships were contested: men's team, singles, and doubles.

The men's team championship was won by the Stanford, their third team national title. The Cardinal defeated Trinity (TX) in the final, 5–4. The men's singles title was won by Matt Mitchell from Stanford, and the men's doubles title went to Bruce Manson and Christopher Lewis of USC.

== Team tournament ==
First round
Stanford	8
Utah	1
California	6
Georgia	3
UCLA	8
Yale	1
Texas	9
Michigan	0
Trinity (TX)	8
Oklahoma	1
USC	5
North Carolina	4
SMU	7
Princeton	2
Miami (FL)	5
TCU	4

Quarterfinals
Stanford	5
California	1
UCLA	5
Texas	4
Trinity (TX)	5
USC	4
SMU	5
Miami (FL)	0

Semifinals
Stanford	6
UCLA	3
Trinity (TX)	5
SMU	4

Championship
Stanford	5
Trinity (TX)	4

== Singles tournament ==
=== Finals bracket ===
Semifinals
1	(United States) M Mitchell (STAN)	6	6
(United States) C Lewis (USC)	2	4
12	(United States) T Graham (UCLA)	6	7^{5}
2	(United States) B Manson (USC)	4	6^{4}

Championship
1	(United States) M Mitchell (STAN)	6	1	6	6
12	(United States) T Graham (UCLA)	2	6	3	4

== Doubles tournament ==
=== Finals bracket ===
Semifinals
5	(United States) B Manson (USC) (United States) C Lewis (USC)	6	6
9	(United States) T Graham (UCLA) (United States) J Paley (UCLA)	4	3
(United States) J Austin (UCLA) (United States) B Nichols (UCLA)	6	6
8	(United States) F Taygan (UCLA) (United States) V Winitsky (UCLA)	3	3

Championship
5	(United States) B Manson (USC) (United States) C Lewis (USC)	6	6	6^{4}	6
(United States) J Austin (UCLA) (United States) B Nichols (UCLA)	2	3	7^{5}	3

== See also ==
- NCAA Division I Women's Tennis Championship (introduced 1982)
- NCAA Men's Division II Tennis Championship
- NCAA Men's Division III Tennis Championship
