= 1957 NCAA tennis championships =

1957 NCAA Tennis Championships
- Date: June 1957
- Edition: 12th
- Location: Salt Lake City, Utah
- Venue: Eccles Tennis Center; University of Utah

Champions

Men's singles
- (United States) Barry MacKay (tennis) (Michigan)

Men's doubles
- (United States) Crawford Henry / (United States) Ronald Holmberg (Tulane)
← 1956 ·	NCAA Tennis Championships	· 1958 →

The 1957 NCAA Tennis Championships were the 12th annual NCAA-sponsored tournaments to determine the national champions of men's singles, doubles, and team collegiate tennis in the United States.

Michigan won the team championship, the Wolverines' first such title. Michigan finished just one point ahead of Tulane, 10–9, in the final team standings.

Barry MacKay won the Singles Title over Sammy Giammalva of Texas in 5 sets.

== Host site ==
This year's tournaments were contested at the Eccles Tennis Center at the University of Utah in Salt Lake City, Utah.

== Team scoring ==
Until 1977, the men's team championship was determined by points awarded based on individual performances in the singles and doubles events.
