= 1976 NCAA Division I tennis championships =

1976 NCAA Division I Tennis Championships
- Date: May 1976
- Edition: 31st
- Location: Corpus Christi, Texas
- Venue: HEB Tennis Center

Champions

Men's singles
- (United States) Bill Scanlon (Trinity (TX))

Men's doubles
- (United States) Peter Fleming / (United States) Ferdi Taygan (UCLA)
← 1975 ·	NCAA Division I Tennis Championships	· 1977 →

The 1976 NCAA Division I Tennis Championships were the 31st annual tournaments to determine the national champions of NCAA Division I men's singles, doubles, and team collegiate tennis in the United States.

USC and UCLA shared the team championship, the twelfth for both the Bruins and the Trojans, after the two teams finished tied atop the final team standings (21–21).

== Host site ==
This year's tournaments were contested at the Orville I. Cox Tennis Center at University of Texas–Pan American (now known as University of Texas–Rio Grande Valley) in Edinburg, Texas, but actually played at the HEB Tennis Center in Corpus Christi, Texas.

== Team scoring ==
Until 1977, the men's team championship was determined by points awarded based on individual performances in the singles and doubles events.
