= 1978 NCAA Division I tennis championships =

1978 NCAA Division I Tennis Championships
- Date: May 1978
- Edition: 33rd
- Location: Athens, Georgia, United States
- Venue: Dan Magill Tennis Complex (University of Georgia)

Champions

Men's singles
- John McEnroe (Stanford)

Men's doubles
- John Austin / Bruce Nichols (UCLA)

Men's team
- Stanford (4th title)
← 1977 ·	NCAA Division I Tennis Championships	· 1979 →

The 1978 NCAA Division I Tennis Championships were the 33rd annual tournaments to determine the national champions of NCAA men's college tennis. Matches were played during May 1978 at the Dan Magill Tennis Complex in Athens, Georgia on the campus of the University of Georgia. A total of three championships were contested: men's team, singles, and doubles.

The men's team championship was won by the Stanford, their fourth team national title. The Cardinal defeated UCLA in the final, 6–3. The men's singles title was won by John McEnroe from Stanford, and the men's doubles title went to John Austin and Bruce Nichols of UCLA.

== Team tournament ==
First round
Stanford	8
South Carolina	1
Arizona State	6
Oklahoma State	3
SMU	8
NC State	1
California	8
Princeton	1
UCLA	7
North Carolina	2
Pepperdine	6
LSU	3
USC	6
Houston	3
Trinity (TX)	8
Wisconsin	1

Quarterfinals
Stanford	8
Arizona State	1
SMU	7
California	2
UCLA	6
Pepperdine	3
USC	5
Trinity (TX)	4

Semifinals
Stanford	7
SMU	2
UCLA	7
USC	2

Championship
Stanford	6
UCLA	3
Third place
SMU	5
USC	4

== See also ==
- NCAA Division I Women's Tennis Championship (from 1982)
- NCAA Men's Division II Tennis Championship
- NCAA Men's Division III Tennis Championship
