= Marco Born =

American athletics director

Biographical details
- Born: February 11, 1983 (age 43); Hannover Germany

Playing career
- 2004: Tennessee Tech
- 2005–2007: Middle Tennessee State
- Position: Tennis

Administrative career (AD unless noted)
- 2007–2011: Middle Tennessee State (Group Sales and Marketing Representative)
- 2011–2013: Middle Tennessee State (Director of Ticketing)
- 2013–2014: Middle Tennessee State (Associate Athletics Director)
- 2014–2017: Louisiana Tech (Senior Associate Athletics Director for External Affairs)
- 2017–2018: Louisiana Tech (Executive Associate Athletic Director)
- 2018–2022: Lamar

Accomplishments and honors

Championships
- National Championship, Tennis doubles, 2007; All-American Doubles National Championship, 2005

Awards
- Middle Tennessee State University Hall of Fame (Class of 2017)

Marco Born (born February 11, 1983), the former director of athletics for Lamar University, was named to the position on March 29, 2018. He previously served in several positions of increasing responsibility at the Louisiana Tech University and Middle Tennessee State University athletic departments. He graduated with his bachelor's and master's degrees from Middle Tennessee State University where he lettered in tennis. Born resigned his position on March 10, 2022 after a leave of absence for personal reasons beginning on January 13, 2022.

== Athletic history ==
Born and teammate, Andreas Siljeström, won the 2007 NCAA Division I Tennis doubles championship. He and Siljeström also won the 2005 All-American Doubles National Championship. The two were two-time ITA all-Americans (2006, 2007). The two were named to the Middle Tennessee State Athletic Hall of Fame (Class of 2017) on September 23, 2017.
