= 1958 NCAA tennis championships =

1958 NCAA Tennis Championships
- Date: June 1958
- Edition: 13th
- Location: Annapolis, Maryland
- Venue: United States Naval Academy

Champions

Men's singles
- (Peru) (United States) Alejandro Olmedo (USC)

Men's doubles
- (Peru) (United States) Alejandro Olmedo / (United States) Edward Atkinson (USC)
← 1957 ·	NCAA Tennis Championships	· 1959 →

The 1958 NCAA Tennis Championships were the 13th annual NCAA-sponsored tournaments to determine the national champions of men's singles, doubles, and team collegiate tennis in the United States.

USC won the team championship, the Trojans' fourth such title. USC finished four points ahead of Stanford, 13–9, in the final team standings.

== Host site ==
This year's tournaments were contested at the United States Naval Academy in Annapolis, Maryland.

== Team scoring ==
Until 1977, the men's team championship was determined by points awarded based on individual performances in the singles and doubles events.
