= 1975 NCAA Division I tennis championships =

1975 NCAA Division I Tennis Championships
- Date: May 1975
- Edition: 30th
- Location: Corpus Christi, Texas
- Venue: HEB Tennis Center; University of Texas–Pan American

Champions

Men's singles
- (United States) Billy Martin (UCLA)

Men's doubles
- (United States) Butch Walts / (United States) Bruce Manson (USC)
← 1974 ·	NCAA Division I Tennis Championships	· 1976 →

The 1975 NCAA Division I Tennis Championships were the 30th annual tournaments to determine the national champions of NCAA Division I men's singles, doubles, and team collegiate tennis in the United States.

UCLA captured the team championship, the Bruins' eleventh such title. UCLA finished seven points ahead of Miami (FL) in the final team standings (27–20).

== Host site ==
This year's tournaments were hosted by University of Texas–Pan American (now known as University of Texas–Rio Grande Valley) and contested at the HEB Tennis Center in Corpus Christi, Texas.

== Team scoring ==
Until 1977, the men's team championship was determined by points awarded based on individual performances in the singles and doubles events.
