= 1959 NCAA tennis championships =

1959 NCAA Tennis Championships
- Date: June 1959
- Edition: 14th
- Location: Evanston, Illinois
- Venue: Northwestern University

Champions

Men's singles
- (United States) Whitney Reed (San Jose State)

Men's doubles
- (United States) Crawford Henry / (United States) Ronald Holmberg (Tulane)
← 1958 ·	NCAA Tennis Championships	· 1960 →

The 1959 NCAA Tennis Championships were the 14th annual NCAA-sponsored tournaments to determine the national champions of men's singles, doubles, and team collegiate tennis in the United States.

Notre Dame and Tulane shared the team championship, the first such title for both the Fighting Irish and the Green Wave. Both teams finished with 8 points in the final team standings.

== Host site ==
This year's tournaments were contested at Northwestern University in Evanston, Illinois.

== Team scoring ==
Until 1977, the men's team championship was determined by points awarded based on individual performances in the singles and doubles events.
