= Matías Boeker =

Argentine American tennis player (born 1980)

- Country (sports): Argentina (1998 – 11 August 2002); United States (26 August 2002 – 2005)
- Residence: Deerfield Beach, Florida, U.S.
- Born: December 11, 1980 (age 44); Buenos Aires, Argentina
- Turned pro: 1998
- Retired: 2005
- Plays: Right-handed
- Prize money: $131,854

Singles
- Career record: 1–4
- Career titles: 0
- Highest ranking: No. 216 (June 7, 2004)

Grand Slam singles results
- French Open: Q3 (2005)
- Wimbledon: Q1 (2004, 2005)
- US Open: 1R (2002)

Doubles
- Career record: 0–1
- Career titles: 0
- Highest ranking: No. 200 (May 16, 2005)

Grand Slam doubles results
- US Open: 1R (2002)

Matías Boeker (born December 11, 1980) is a former professional tennis player from the United States.

== Career ==
Playing for the University of Georgia in 2001, Boeker became just the third player in NCAA history to win the Division I singles, doubles and team titles in the same year. Boeker, who partnered Travis Parrott in the doubles, was named the Southeastern Conference Male Athlete of the Year. In 2002 he won the singles championship again, to become the first person since Mikael Pernfors in 1985 to win back-to-back titles. He was an All-American in 2000, 2001 and 2002.

Boeker competed in both the men's singles and doubles at the 2002 US Open. He lost in the opening round of the singles to Thomas Enqvist and was also beaten in the first round of the doubles (with Robby Ginepri) to Wayne Arthurs and Andrew Kratzmann.

== NCAA titles ==
=== Singles: (2) ===
No.	Year	Opponent in the final	Score in the final
1.	2001	Brian Vahaly (Virginia)	6–2, 6–4
1.	2002	Jesse Witten (Kentucky)	7–5, 6–0

=== Doubles: (1) ===
No.	Year	Partner	Opponents in the final	Score in the final
1.	2001	Travis Parrott	Johan Brunstrom (Southern Methodist); Jon Wallmark (Southern Methodist)	6–4, 7–5

== Challenger titles ==
=== Singles: (1) ===
No.	Year	Tournament	Surface	Opponent in the final	Score in the final
1.	2004	Lexington, United States	Hard	(United States) Jesse Witten	6–2, 4–6, 7–6^{(7–5)}

=== Doubles: (2) ===
No.	Year	Tournament	Surface	Partner	Opponents in the final	Score in the final
1.	2004	Tallahassee, United States	Hard	(Israel) Noam Okun	(Australia) Mark Hlawaty (Australia) Brad Weston	6–7^{(3–7)}, 6–3, 6–4
2.	2004	Lexington, United States	Hard	(United States) Amer Delic	(India) Harsh Mankad (United States) Jason Marshall	7–5, 6–4
