= Baylor Bears men's tennis =

- Founded: 1970
- University: Baylor University
- Head coach: Michael Woodson (1st season)
- Conference: Big 12
- Location: Waco, TX
- Home Court: Hurd Tennis Center
- Nickname: Bears
- Colors: Green and gold

NCAA Tournament championships
- 2004

NCAA Tournament appearances
- 1998, 1999, 2000, 2001, 2002, 2003, 2004, 2005, 2006, 2007, 2008, 2009, 2010, 2011, 2012, 2013, 2014, 2015, 2016, 2017, 2018, 2019, 2021, 2022

Conference Tournament championships
- 2002, 2003, 2004, 2005, 2007, 2008, 2009, 2014, 2019, 2021, 2022

Conference regular season champions
- 2000, 2002, 2003, 2004, 2005, 2006, 2007, 2008, 2009, 2011, 2013, 2014, 2015, 2021

The Baylor Bears men's tennis (Note: Historically, Baylor women's teams had been known as "Lady Bears". The last three teams that used "Lady Bears", specifically basketball, soccer, and volleyball, dropped "Lady" from their nicknames at the start of the 2021–22 school year. Women's tennis had dropped "Lady" earlier.) team represents Baylor University in NCAA Division I college tennis. The team is part of the Big 12 Conference and plays home matches at the Hurd Tennis Center. The Bears are currently led by interim head coach Michael Woodson.

== History ==
Men's tennis debuted at Baylor University in 1970, but the program did not see continued success until the arrival of Matt Knoll in 1997. After a 13–12 campaign in his inaugural year, Coach Knoll led the team to its first NCAA Tournament appearance in 1998. In 2000, the team won its first conference championship. The program defining moment was reached in 2004 when the Bears won their first NCAA championship.

The team has made the NCAA tournament each season since 1998. The Bears have been regular season conference champions 13 times and have gone on to also win the conference tournament in eight of those years.

After Knoll's resignation at the conclusion of the 2017-2018 season, Brian Boland was named director of tennis and head men's tennis coach on May 25, 2018. In July 2020, Boland resigned following an investigation by university officials into inappropriate text messages he had sent to a student who had hoped to join Baylor's women's team.

== Stadium ==
Baylor tennis plays their home matches at the Hurd Tennis Center, named after the Hurd family. Opened in 2000, the facility contains 12 outdoor courts, and a clubhouse with offices. The listed capacity of the center is 3,000, including amphitheater seating. There is chair-back seating along the baselines for 1,200. Also, a LED scoreboard has been built in the middle of the front six courts, allowing an easier time for fans to keep track of several matches at once. The Bears also play at the Hawkins Indoor Tennis Center, completed in 2013. The $7 million building includes six courts and more than 34,000 square-feet of space.

The Hurd Tennis Center has hosted numerous postseason events since its construction, most notably the 2015 NCAA Championships. It has also hosted the first and second rounds of the NCAA tournament and the Big 12 Championships.

== Year-by-year results (since 1997) ==
Season	Overall record	Conference record	Conference standing	Postseason	Final nat'l rank	Notes
1997	13–12	3–6	8th	None	NR	Big 12 Tournament Quarterfinalists
1998	15–9	7–2	T-2nd	NCAA First Round	#26	Big 12 Tournament Semifinalists
1999	25–4	7–1	2nd	NCAA Elite Eight	#10	Big 12 Tournament Runner-Up
2000	23–6	8–0	1st	NCAA Round of 16	#7	Big 12 Tournament Runner-Up
2001	12–12	6–2	2nd	NCAA First Round	#30	Big 12 Tournament Semifinalists
2002	27–2	7–0	1st	NCAA Round of 16	#7	Big 12 Tournament Champions
2003	28–2	7–0	1st	NCAA Elite Eight	#4	Big 12 Tournament Champions
2004	32–2	7–0	1st	NCAA National Champions	#1	Big 12 Tournament Champions
2005	33–1	7–0	1st	NCAA National Runner-Up	#2	Big 12 Tournament Champions
2006	25–7	6–1	1st	NCAA Final Four	#4	Big 12 Tournament Runner-Up
2007	28–4	6–0	1st	NCAA Final Four	#4	Big 12 Tournament Champions
2008	25–9	5–1	1st	NCAA Elite Eight	#8	Big 12 Tournament Champions
2009	26–6	6–0	1st	NCAA Elite Eight	#7	Big 12 Tournament Champions
2010	24–7	4–2	3rd	NCAA Elite Eight	#7	Big 12 Tournament Semifinalists
2011	22–5	6–0	1st	NCAA Round of 16	#6	Big 12 Tournament Champions
2012	19–12	3–2	3rd	NCAA Round of 16	#18	Big 12 Tournament Runner-Up
2013	22–6	5–0	1st	NCAA Round of 16	#13	Big 12 Tournament Runner-Up
2014	26–6	4–1	1st	NCAA Elite Eight	#6	Big 12 Tournament Champions
2015	25-6	4–1	1st	NCAA Final Four	#3	Big 12 Tournament Runner-Up
2016	16-14	1-4	5th	NCAA Second Round	#32	Big 12 Tournament Semifinalists
2017	23-8	2-3	3rd	NCAA Round of 16	#9	Big 12 Tournament Quarterfinalists
2018	21-10	1-4	5th	NCAA Second Round	#17	Big 12 Tournament Runner-Up
TOTALS	510-150	112-30				

== Former players ==
- Benjamin Becker
- Benedikt Dorsch
- Matias Marin
- John Peers
