= Illinois Fighting Illini men's tennis =

Illinois Fighting Illini Men's Tennis
- Founded: 1890
- University: University of Illinois at Urbana–Champaign
- Head coach: Brad Dancer (14th season)
- Conference: Big Ten
- Location: Urbana, Illinois, US
- Home Court: Atkins Tennis Center (Capacity: 3,800)
- Nickname: Fighting Illini
- Colors: Orange and blue

NCAA Tournament championships
- 2003

NCAA Tournament runner-up
- 2007

NCAA Tournament Semifinals
- 2003, 2004, 2007

NCAA Tournament Quarterfinals
- 1999, 2000, 2002, 2003, 2004, 2007, 2018

NCAA Tournament Round of 16
- 1999, 2000, 2002, 2003, 2004, 2005, 2006, 2007, 2008, 2009, 2011, 2012, 2014, 2015, 2017, 2018

NCAA Tournament Round of 32
- 1999, 2000, 2001, 2002, 2003, 2004, 2005, 2006, 2007, 2008, 2009, 2010, 2011, 2012, 2013, 2014, 2015, 2016, 2017, 2018, 2019

NCAA Tournament appearances
- 1996, 1997, 1998, 1999, 2000, 2001, 2002, 2003, 2004, 2005, 2006, 2007, 2008, 2009, 2010, 2011, 2012, 2013, 2014, 2015, 2016, 2017, 2018, 2019

Conference Tournament championships
- 1999, 2000, 2002, 2003, 2004, 2005, 2012, 2015, 2021

Conference regular season champions
- 1914, 1917, 1922, 1924, 1926, 1927, 1928, 1932, 1946, 1997, 1998, 1999, 2000, 2001, 2002, 2003, 2004, 2005, 2015

The Illinois Fighting Illini men's tennis team is an NCAA Division I college tennis team competing in the Big Ten Conference. The team plays its home matches at the Atkins Tennis Center in Urbana, Illinois.

== History ==
The Illinois men's tennis program was founded in 1908, but has enjoyed most of its success in recent years.

The Illini have been one of the most successful men's tennis programs in the nation over the past twenty seasons, winning nine consecutive Big Ten Championships from 1997–2005; six of seven Big Ten Tournament Championships between 1999 and 2005; appearing in the NCAA Sweet Sixteen fourteen times, including eight years in a row (2002–09); advancing to three NCAA Final Fours between 2003 and 2007; and winning the 2003 NCAA National Championship.

Illinois men's tennis won two ITA National Team Indoor Championships in 2003 and 2004, and reached the championship match three other times in 1998, 1999, and 2002.

Illinois men's tennis owns the record for longest consecutive win streak in NCAA history at 64 matches, spanning from their first match of the 2002-2003 season and ending with a 4-2 defeat by UCLA in the semifinals of the 2004 NCAA Men's Tennis Tournament.

== Individual NCAA Champions ==
Singles
| Year | Player |
| 2003 | Amer Delic |
Doubles
| Year | Team |
| 2000 | Cary Franklin & Graydon Oliver |
| 2003 | Rajeev Ram & Brian Wilson |
| 2007 | Kevin Anderson & Ryan Rowe |

== All-Americans ==
| Year | Player |
|---|---|
| 1997–98 | Gavin Sontag |
| 1998–99 | Cary Franklin, Oliver Freelove |
| 1999–2000 | Cary Franklin, Jeff Laski, Graydon Oliver |
| 2000–01 | Graydon Oliver, Amer Delic |
| 2001–02 | Amer Delic, Michael Calkins |
| 2002–03 | Amer Delic, Rajeev Ram, Brian Wilson |
| 2003–04 | Phil Stolt, Brian Wilson |
| 2004–05 | Ryler DeHeart, Kevin Anderson |
| 2005–06 | Kevin Anderson, Ryler DeHeart, Ryan Rowe |
| 2006–07 | Kevin Anderson, Ryan Rowe |
| 2010–11 | Dennis Nevolo |
| 2011–12 | Dennis Nevolo |
| 2013–14 | Jared Hiltzik, Farris Gosea, Tim Kopinski, Ross Guignon |
| 2014–15 | Jared Hiltzik |
| 2015–16 | Aleksandar Vukic, Jared Hiltzik |
| 2016–17 | Aleksandar Vukic |
| 2017–18 | Aleksandar Vukic |
| 2018–19 | Aleksandar Kovacevic |
| 2019–20 | Alex Brown |
| 2020–21 | Aleksandar Kovacevic, Siphosothando Montsi |
| 2022-2023 | Karlis Ozolins, Hunter Heck |
