= Arizona Wildcats men's tennis =

Men's tennis team of the University of Arizona

- University: University of Arizona
- Athletic director: Desireé Reed-Francois
- Conference: Big 12
- Location: Tucson, Arizona, US
- Home Court: LaNelle Robson Tennis Center (Capacity: 1,000)
- Nickname: Arizona Wildcats
- Colors: Cardinal and navy

NCAA Tournament appearances
- 1996, 1998, 2001, 2003, 2004, 2006, 2009, 2010, 2019, 2021, 2022, 2023, 2024, 2025, 2026

Conference Tournament championships
- Pac-12: 2024 Big 12:2025

Conference regular season champions
- Pac-12: 2022, 2023, 2024 Big 12:2026

The Arizona Wildcats men's tennis team represents the University of Arizona in the sport of tennis. The Wildcats compete in Division I of the National Collegiate Athletic Association (NCAA) and the Big 12 Conference (Big 12). The team hosts its home matches in LaNelle Robson Tennis Center on the university's Tucson, Arizona campus.

== Year-by-year results ==
Season	Overall record	Conference record	National	Conference Season	Conference Tournament
1998–99	2–2	–	–		
1999–2000	4–8	–	–		
2000–01	5–5	–	–		
2001–02	8–10	–	–		
2002–03	8–10	–	–		
2003–04	13–9	–	–		
2004–05	–	–	–		
2005–06	–	–	–		
2006–07	–	–	–		
2007–08	11–10	1–5	–		
2008–09	17–5	2–4	–		
2009–10	13–11	1–5	–		
2010–11	9–14	0–6	–	6th	
2011–12	5–18	0–7	–	8th	T8th
2012–13	10–14	0–8	–	8th	T8th
2013–14	12–14	1–6	–	8th	T8th
2014–15	8–19	0–7	–	8th	T8th
2015–16	8–17	0–7	–	8th	T8th
2016–17	9–16	0–7	–	8th	T8th
2017–18	16–15	0–8	–	9th	T5th
2018–19	17–8	3–5	–	6th	T5th
2019–20	11–3	N/A (COVID)			
2020–21	21–8	5–2	–	2nd	T3rd
2021–22	21–7	7–0	–	1st	T5th
2022–23	23–7	6–2	–	T1st	T3rd
2023–24	26–4	7–1	–	T1st	1st
2024–25	26–5	6–2	–	T2nd	1st
2025–26	25–5	8–0	–	1st	2nd

== All-Americans ==
As of the end of the 2025–2026 season, twelve members of the Arizona men's tennis teams have earned eighteen All-American honors.

- George Stoesser – Singles (1961, 1962)
- Billy Lenoir – Singles (1962, 1963, 1964)
- Fred Drilling – Singles (1964)
- Brian Cheney – Singles (1967, 1968, 1969)
- Rand Evett – Singles (1973)
- Paul Chamberlin – Singles (1984)
- Doug Livingston – Singles (1991)
- Jan Anderson – Singles (1994)
- Roger Matalonga – Doubles (2005, 2006)
- Colin O'Grady – Doubles (2005)
- Colton Smith – Singles (2024, 2025)
- Jay Friend – Singles (2025)

== See also ==
- Arizona Wildcats
- History of the University of Arizona
