= VCU Rams men's tennis =

- University: Virginia Commonwealth University
- Head coach: Anthony Rossi (1st season)
- Conference: A10
- Location: Richmond, Virginia, US
- Home Court: Thalhimer Tennis Center (Capacity: 300)
- Nickname: VCU Rams
- Colors: Black and gold

NCAA Tournament runner-up
- 2000

NCAA Tournament appearances
- 1993, 1994, 1995, 1996, 1997, 1998, 1999, 2000, 2001, 2002, 2003, 2004, 2005, 2006, 2007, 2008, 2010, 2011, 2012, 2013, 2014, 2017, 2018, 2019, 2021, 2022, 2023, 2024, 2025

Conference Tournament championships
- 1996, 1997, 1998, 1999, 2000, 2001, 2002, 2003, 2004, 2006, 2008, 2010, 2012, 2013, 2014, 2017, 2018, 2019, 2021, 2022, 2023, 2024, 2025

The VCU Rams men's tennis team represents Virginia Commonwealth University. Under Coach Paul Kostin's direction, VCU has reached the NCAA tournament in 18 of the past 19 years and finished a season ranked among the top 25 Division I teams a total of 12 times.

== Facilities ==
=== Thalhimer Tennis Center ===
A 6 court facility that currently holds 300 people. It's located between Main and Cary Street in the heart of VCU's Monroe Park Campus, allowing easy access for the student-athletes between practice and class.

=== New Tennis Center ===
The 2014-2020 six year capital plan calls for a 14 million dollar, state-of-the-art, modern Tennis center that will include 6 indoor courts, a spectator viewing space, and 12 outdoor courts.

== National champions runner-up ==
The Ram's performance in the 2000 NCAA tournament culminated in VCU's first appearance in a national championship match. The unseeded Rams strung together five consecutive victories, including wins over three of the nation's top 13 ranked programs, to set up a showdown with Stanford for the national title. VCU advanced to the “Sweet 16” with a victory over No. 13 Mississippi, and then continued its Cinderella story by upsetting fourth-ranked Illinois in the quarterfinal round. The Rams reached the title match with a 4–3 victory over powerhouse Tennessee in the Final Four and received a final ranking of No. 9 by the Intercollegiate Tennis Association. This was, at the time, the highest-ever ranking for any VCU sport at the end of a season. The record stood for 11 years until the men's basketball team finished with a ranking of No. 6.

== New coaching structure ==
In 2019, the Rams announced that assistant coach Anthony Rossi would become the head coach of the men's team with former coach Paul Kostin entering a new role as VCU's director of tennis. Kostin had served as the men's coach since 1991, and coached both the women's and men's tennis teams as of 2002. Kostin will continue to oversee the tennis program as a whole, but will focus his attention on the women's team with Rossi stepping into the men's head coach role.

== See also ==
2012–13 VCU Rams men's tennis team
