= Michigan Wolverines men's tennis =

- Founded: 1893
- University: University of Michigan
- Athletic director: Warde Manuel
- Head coach: Sean Maymi (1st season)
- Conference: Big Ten
- Location: Ann Arbor, MI
- Home Court: University of Michigan Varsity Tennis Center (Capacity: Indoor: 632; Outdoor: 600)
- Nickname: Wolverines
- Colors: Maize and blue

NCAA Tournament championships
- 1957

NCAA Tournament Semifinals
- 1988

NCAA Tournament Quarterfinals
- 1988, 2022, 2023

NCAA Tournament Round of 16
- 1977, 1979, 1980, 1981, 1982, 1983, 1985, 1987, 2008, 2018, 2022, 2023

NCAA Tournament Round of 32
- 2000, 2007, 2008, 2009, 2010, 2012, 2016, 2017, 2018, 2019, 2022, 2023

NCAA Tournament appearances
- 1955, 1957, 1970, 1971, 1972, 1973, 1974, 1975, 1976, 1977, 1979, 1980, 1981, 1982, 1983, 1985, 1987, 1988, 1994, 1995, 1996, 1998, 1999, 2000, 2001, 2002, 2006, 2007, 2008, 2009, 2010, 2011, 2012, 2013, 2014, 2016, 2017, 2018, 2019, 2021, 2022, 2023

Conference Tournament championships
- 2022

Conference regular season champions
- 1919, 1920, 1923, 1941, 1944, 1945, 1955, 1956, 1957, 1959, 1960, 1961, 1962, 1965, 1966, 1968, 1969, 1970, 1971, 1972, 1973, 1974, 1975, 1976, 1977, 1978, 1979, 1980, 1981, 1982, 1983, 1985, 1987, 1988, 1996, 2021

The Michigan Wolverines men's tennis team represents the University of Michigan in National Collegiate Athletic Association (NCAA) Division I competition. College men's tennis became a varsity sport at the University of Michigan in 1893.

== History ==
Sean Maymi has been the coach since 2023. The team plays its home matches at the University of Michigan Varsity Tennis Center. The program won its only national title in 1957. Joel Ross was captain of the tennis team, and was Big Ten singles champion in 1971.

On March 3, 2022, Michigan defeated the No. 1 ranked TCU Horned Frogs. This marked the first time since rankings were introduced in 1996–97 that Michigan has defeated the No. 1 ranked team.
