= Texas Longhorns men's tennis =

Texas men's tennis team

- Founded: 1912; 114 years ago
- University: University of Texas at Austin
- Athletic director: Chris Del Conte
- Head coach: Bruce Berque (7th season)
- Conference: SEC
- Location: Austin, Texas, US
- Home Court: Texas Tennis Center
- Nickname: Longhorns
- Colors: Burnt Orange and White

NCAA Tournament championships
- 2019

NCAA Tournament runner-up
- 1955, 2008, 2024, 2026

NCAA Tournament Semifinals
- 1993, 2006, 2008, 2009, 2019, 2021, 2023, 2024, 2025, 2026

NCAA Tournament Quarterfinals
- 1977, 1985, 1986, 1987, 1988, 1990, 1992, 1993, 1994, 1997, 2006, 2008, 2009, 2014, 2017, 2019, 2021, 2023, 2024, 2025, 2026

NCAA Tournament Round of 16
- 1977, 1979, 1983, 1984, 1985, 1986, 1987, 1988, 1990, 1992, 1993, 1994, 1995, 1996, 1997, 1998, 1999, 2000, 2002, 2003, 2006, 2007, 2008, 2009, 2010, 2014, 2015, 2016, 2017, 2018, 2019, 2021, 2022, 2023, 2024, 2025, 2026

NCAA Tournament Round of 32
- 1977, 1979, 1983, 1984, 1985, 1986, 1987, 1988, 1990, 1992, 1993, 1994, 1995, 1996, 1997, 1998, 1999, 2000, 2001, 2002, 2003, 2004, 2005, 2006, 2007, 2008, 2009, 2010, 2011, 2013, 2014, 2015, 2016, 2017, 2018, 2019, 2021, 2022, 2023, 2024, 2025, 2026

NCAA Tournament appearances
- 1946, 1947, 1949, 1951, 1952, 1953, 1954, 1955, 1957, 1960, 1961, 1962, 1963, 1964, 1965, 1966, 1967, 1968, 1969, 1970, 1971, 1972, 1973, 1974, 1975, 1976, 1977, 1979, 1983, 1984, 1985, 1986, 1987, 1988, 1990, 1992, 1993, 1994, 1995, 1996, 1997, 1998, 1999, 2000, 2001, 2002, 2003, 2004, 2005, 2006, 2007, 2008, 2009, 2010, 2011, 2012, 2013, 2014, 2015, 2016, 2017, 2018, 2019, 2021, 2022, 2023, 2024, 2025, 2026

Conference Tournament championships
- SWC; 1990, 1993 Big 12; 1997, 1999, 2006, 2010, 2018, 2024

Conference regular season champions
- SWC; 1915, 1948, 1949, 1950, 1951, 1952, 1953, 1954, 1955, 1956, 1957, 1961, 1963, 1967, 1977, 1990, 1993, 1994, 1995 Big 12; 1997, 1998, 1999, 2006, 2008, 2010, 2014, 2019, 2021, 2023, 2024

The Texas Longhorns men's tennis team represents the University of Texas at Austin in NCAA Division I intercollegiate men's tennis competition. The Longhorns competed in the Big 12 Conference through the 2024 season and moved to the Southeastern Conference (SEC) on July 1, 2024.

The team has played at The University of Texas as early as 1884, although it was not until 1909 that intercollegiate competition developed. Between that time and the advent of the Southwest Conference in 1915, Texas and Oklahoma annually held a meet for the championship of the Southwest. The first season of Texas Men's Tennis was in 1912. Since forming, the Men's Tennis team has won 17 Southwest Conference Championships, 5 Big 12 Championships and the 2019 NCAA Championship. Texas teams have reached the NCAA Championship semifinals five times (1993, 2006, 2008, 2009, and 2019) and prior to the formation of the tournament when the final standings were determined by a poll, the Longhorns finished fourth or better five times, including 1946 (4th), 1952 (tie 4th), 1955 (2nd), 1957 (3rd), and 1960 (tie 4th).

The team has also produced athletes who have gone on to achieve professional success on the ATP Tour including Lloyd Glasspool and Eliot Spizzirri. Glasspool achieved a career high doubles ranking of #1 in the world on August 18th, 2025. Spizzirri achieved a career high ATP ranking of 67 in the world after reaching the second round of the Australian open before losing in a close match against world #2 Jannik Sinner.

In March 2019 tennis head coach Michael Center was arrested and charged with conspiracy to commit mail fraud as part of the 2019 college admissions bribery scandal.

Despite losing their head coach to scandal just two months earlier, the Texas Men's Tennis team won its first ever NCAA tennis championship over Wake Forest in May 2019 under Coach Bruce Berque.

== Head coach ==
#	Coach	Years	Seasons	Overall			Conference		
#	Coach	Years	Seasons	Won	Lost	%	Won	Lost	%
1	Dr. D.A. Penick	1946–1956	11	259	23	.918			
2	Wilmer Allison	1957–1973	17	455	174	.723			
3	Dave Snyder	1974–2000	27	515	188	.733	157	38	.805
4	Michael Center	2001–2018	18	365	137	.727	70	38	.648
5	Bruce Berque	2019–present	5	84	23	.785	11	3	.786
Total			75	1654	539	.754	232	76	.753

== Yearly record ==
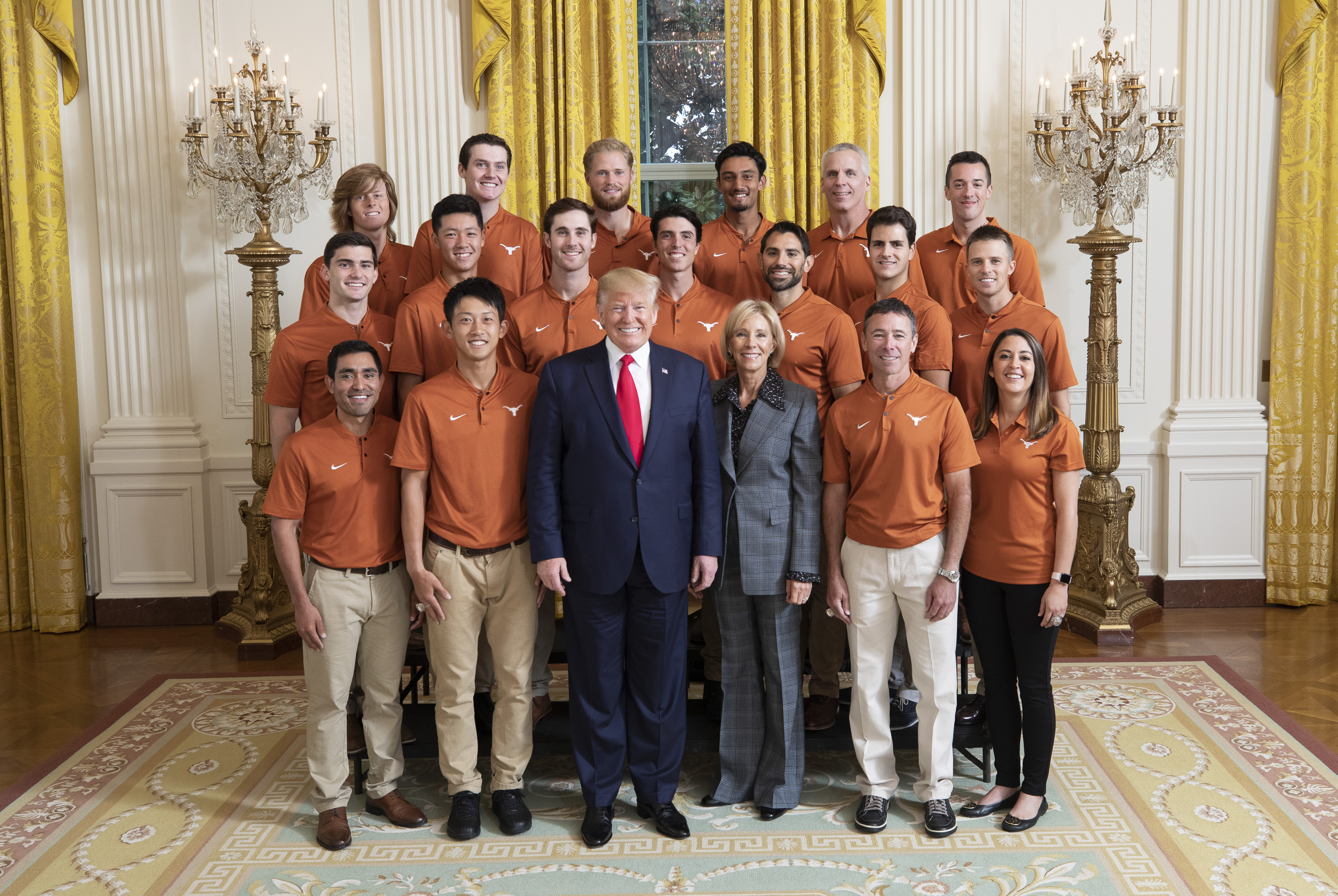
The Longhorns men's tennis team at the White House in 2019

Legend
National champions
Conference champions
Conference Tournament Champions

Season	Coach	Record		Conference standing	Conference tournament	ITA rank	Notes
Season	Coach	Overall	Conference	Conference standing	Conference tournament	ITA rank	Notes
Southwest Conference
1946	Dr. D.A. Penick	–	–				4th
1947	Dr. D.A. Penick	–	–				T-8th
1948	Dr. D.A. Penick	34–2	–	1st			
1949	Dr. D.A. Penick	32–4	–	1st			7th
1950	Dr. D.A. Penick	25–5	–	1st			
1951	Dr. D.A. Penick	25–5	–	1st			T-5th
1952	Dr. D.A. Penick	27–3	–	1st			T-4th
1953	Dr. D.A. Penick	28–2	–	1st			T-5th
1954	Dr. D.A. Penick	30–0	–	1st			T-7th
1955	Dr. D.A. Penick	30–0	–	1st			2nd
1956	Dr. D.A. Penick	28–2	–	1st			
1957	Wilmer Allison	29–1	–	1st			3rd
1958	Wilmer Allison	24–12	–	3rd			
1959	Wilmer Allison	28–8	–	2nd			
1960	Wilmer Allison	30–6	–	2nd			T-4th
1961	Wilmer Allison	33–3	–	1st			T-13th
1962	Wilmer Allison	27–9	–	2nd			T-13th
1963	Wilmer Allison	32–4	–	1st			T-24th
1964	Wilmer Allison	26–10	–	3rd			8th
1965	Wilmer Allison	24–12	–	2nd			T-21st
1966	Wilmer Allison	24–12	–	3rd			T-20th
1967	Wilmer Allison	28–8	–	1st			T-24th
1968	Wilmer Allison	17–19	–	4th			T-32nd
1969	Wilmer Allison	24–10	–	2nd			T-13th
1970	Wilmer Allison	20–16	–	4th			T-18th
1971	Wilmer Allison	27–15	–	3rd			T-36th
1972	Wilmer Allison	29–13	–	3rd			T-18th
1973	Wilmer Allison	33–16	–	3rd			T-11th
1974	Dave Snyder	31–18	–	3rd			T-13th
1975	Dave Snyder	21–6	6–1	2nd			11th
1976	Dave Snyder	22–4	7–1	2nd			T-11th
1977	Dave Snyder	25–7	7–1	1st			Quarterfinal
1978	Dave Snyder	14–8	7–1	3rd			
1979	Dave Snyder	17–8	6–2	3rd			Round of 16
1980	Dave Snyder	16–8	4–4	5th			
1981	Dave Snyder	13–8	4–4	6th		17	
1982	Dave Snyder	16–8	5–3	T-4th		13	
1983	Dave Snyder	16–11	5–3	4th			Round of 16
1984	Dave Snyder	20–5	7–2	2nd		11	Round of 16
1985	Dave Snyder	26–5	5–2	2nd			Quarterfinal
1986	Dave Snyder	18–4	7–1	2nd		7	Quarterfinal
1987	Dave Snyder	16–5	7–1	2nd			Quarterfinal
1988	Dave Snyder	19–7	6–1	2nd		15	Quarterfinal
1989	Dave Snyder	11–12	4–3	4th			
1990	Dave Snyder	22–2	7–0	1st	Champion	7	Quarterfinal
1991	Dave Snyder	14–7	6–1	2nd		21	
1992	Dave Snyder	14–10	4–2	T-2nd		19	Quarterfinal
1993	Dave Snyder	21–5	6–0	1st	Champion	5	Semifinal
1994	Dave Snyder	10–5	5–1	T-1st		7	Quarterfinal
1995	Dave Snyder	19–5	6–0	1st			Round of 16
1996	Dave Snyder	19–7	5–1	2nd		13	Round of 16
Big 12 Conference
1997	Dave Snyder	26–6	9–0	1st	Champion	10	Quarterfinal
1998	Dave Snyder	24–5	8–1	1st		5	Round of 16
1999	Dave Snyder	25–5	8–0	1st	Champion	9	Round of 16
2000	Dave Snyder	20–7	6–2	3rd		16	Round of 16
2001	Michael Center	18–6	6–2	T-2nd		23	Second Round
2002	Michael Center	23–4	6–1	2nd		15	Round of 16
2003	Michael Center	19–7	6–1	2nd		13	Round of 16
2004	Michael Center	15–12	5–2	3rd		36	Second Round
2005	Michael Center	13–10	2–5	T-5th		28	Second Round
2006	Michael Center	26–4	6–1	T-1st	Champion	3	Semifinal
2007	Michael Center	20–9	4–2	T-2nd		12	Round of 16
2008	Michael Center	25–6	5–1	T-1st		4	Runner-up
2009	Michael Center	23–7	4–2	3rd		9	Semifinal
2010	Michael Center	27–3	6–0	1st	Champion	4	Round of 16
2011	Michael Center	19–9	3–3	T-3rd		16	Second Round
2012	Michael Center	16–10	2–3	4th		27	First Round
2013	Michael Center	17–9	3–2	3rd		23	Second Round
2014	Michael Center	23–6	4–1	T-1st		8	Quarterfinal
2015	Michael Center	21–7	2–3	4th		9	Round of 16
2016	Michael Center	19–12	1–4	T-5th		16	Round of 16
2017	Michael Center	22–9	2–3	T-3rd		11	Quarterfinal
2018	Michael Center	19–7	3–2	T-2nd	Champion	12	Round of 16
2019	Bruce Berque	29–3	5–0	1st		1	National Champions
2020	Bruce Berque	13–3	Season canceled due to the Coronavirus Pandemic				
2021	Bruce Berque	24–6	4–1	T-1st		3	Quarterfinal
2022	Bruce Berque	18–11	3–2	3rd		12	Round of 16
2023	Bruce Berque	26–4	5–0	1st		2	Semifinal
2024	Bruce Berque	27–4	7–0	1st	Champion	2	Runner-up
Southeastern Conference
2025	Bruce Berque	29-5	13-1				
Total		1678–544	SWC: 126–35; Big 12: 113–44				

== NCAA Singles Champions ==
Year	Name
1927	Wilmer Allison
1929	Berkeley Bell
1979	Kevin Curren
1990	Steve Bryan

== NCAA Doubles Champions ==
Year	Name
1923	Lewis White / Louis Thalheimer
1924	Lewis White / Louis Thalheimer
1931	Bruce Barnes / Karl Kamrath
1943	John Hickman / Walter Driver
1944	John Hickman / Felix Kelley
2015	Søren Hess-Olesen / Lloyd Glasspool
2022	Cleeve Harper / Richard Ciamarra

== Conference Singles Champions ==
=== Big 12 ===
Year	Name	Position
1997	B.J. Stearns	#2 Singles
1997	Nick Crowell	#4 Singles
1999	Brandon Hawk	#2 Singles
1999	Jack Barsington	#3 Singles
2000	Michael Blue	#3 Singles
2000	Craig Edmondson	co-#5 Singles
2002	Roger Gubser	co-#6 Singles
2006	Roger Gubser	#2 Singles
2006	Milan Mihailovic	#4 Singles
2006	Miguel Reyes-Varela	#5 Singles
2006	Michael Venus	co-#6 Singles
2008	Ed Corrie	#3 Singles
2008	Luiz Diaz Barriga	#4 Singles
2008	Milan Mihailovic	#5 Singles
2010	Ed Corrie	co-#2 Singles
2010	Josh Zavala	co-#5 Singles
2010	Vasko Mladenov	co-#6 Singles
2011	Jean Andersen	#3 Singles
2012	Sudanwa Sitaram	co-#3 Singles
2013	Lloyd Glasspool	#2 Singles
2014	Søren Hess-Olesen	#1 Singles
2014	Nick Naumann	co-#5 Singles
2019	Christian Sigsgaard	co-#1 Singles
2019	Yuya Ito	#2 Singles
2019	Leonardo Telles	co-#3 Singles
2019	Colin Markes	#5 Singles
2019	Rodrigo Banzer	co-#6 Singles

== Conference Doubles Champions ==
=== Big 12 ===
Year	Name	Position
1997	Jack Brasington / Eric Allen	#2 Doubles
1999	Nick Crowell / Brandon Hawk	#2 Doubles
1999	Michael Blue / Jack Brasington	#3 Doubles
2003	Jean Simon / Jose Zarhi	#1 Doubles
2003	Jimmy Haney / Pete Stroer	#2 Doubles
2004	Antonio Ruiz / Jose Zarhi	#1 Doubles
2005	Hubert Chodkiewicz / Roger Gubser	co-#2 Doubles
2007	Dimitar Kutrovsky / Josh Zavala	#1 Doubles
2008	Dimitar Kutrovsky / Josh Zavala	co-#3 Doubles
2009	Miguel Reyes-Varela / Oliver Sajous	#3 Doubles
2010	Ed Corrie / Kellen Damico	#2 Doubles

== See also ==
- Texas Longhorns women's tennis
