= Texas A&M Men's tennis =

Texas A&M Mens Tennis Team

Texas A&M Aggies Men's Tennis
- Founded: 1978
- University: Texas A&M University
- Athletic director: Trev Alberts
- Head coach: Steve Denton (19th season)
- Conference: SEC
- Location: College Station, Texas, US
- Home Court: Mitchell Tennis Center
- Nickname: Aggies
- Colors: Maroon and white

NCAA Tournament Semifinals
- 2018

NCAA Tournament Quarterfinals
- 2001, 2015, 2018, 2021

NCAA Tournament Round of 16
- 2000, 2001, 2002, 2003, 2004, 2005, 2009, 2010, 2011, 2013, 2015, 2017, 2018, 2021, 2024, 2025

NCAA Tournament Round of 32
- 1999, 2000, 2001, 2002, 2003, 2004, 2005, 2007, 2008, 2009, 2010, 2011, 2013, 2014, 2015, 2016, 2017, 2018, 2019, 2021, 2022, 2023, 2024, 2025, 2026

NCAA Tournament appearances
- 1985,1999, 2000, 2001, 2002, 2003, 2004, 2005, 2006, 2007, 2008, 2009, 2010, 2011, 2013, 2014, 2015, 2016, 2017, 2018, 2019, 2021, 2022, 2023, 2024, 2025, 2026

Conference Tournament championships
- Big 12; 1998, 2000, 2001 SEC; 2014, 2015

Conference regular season champions
- SWC; 1994 Big 12; 2001 SEC; 2015, 2017, 2018

The Texas A&M Aggies men's tennis team represents the Texas A&M University in NCAA Division I intercollegiate men's tennis competition. They compete in the Southeastern Conference (SEC).

The team began play in 1948, under Head Coach W.M. Dowell. They have made the tournament 22 times, and reached the semifinals in 2018.

The Aggies are currently led by Head Coach Steve Denton. During his tenure, Texas A&M have qualified for the NCAA tournament every year except for 2020 which was canceled due to the COVID-19 pandemic. Also during his tenure, the Aggies won their only NCAA doubles championship, which was accomplished by Jeff Dadamo and Austin Krajicek in 2011. Denton has been named conference coach of the year four times (2009, 2011, 2014, and 2015).

== Head coach ==
| # | Coach | Years | Seasons | Overall | | | Conference | | |
| # | Coach | Years | Seasons | Won | Lost | % | Won | Lost | % |
| 1 | W.M. Dowell | 1948–1957 | 10 | 133 | 173 | .435 | | | – |
| 2 | Beau Bell | 1958–1959 | 2 | 14 | 56 | .200 | | | – |
| 3 | Omar Smith | 1960–1974 | 15 | 275 | 304 | .475 | | | – |
| 4 | Richard Barker | 1975–1977 | 3 | 36 | 35 | .507 | | | – |
| 5 | David Kent | 1978–1996 | 19 | 327 | 173 | .654 | 72 | 66 | .522 |
| 6 | Tim Cass | 1997–2006 | 10 | 196 | 83 | .703 | 57 | 23 | .713 |
| 7 | Steve Denton | 2007–Present | 20 | 406 | 187 | .685 | 139 | 60 | .698 |
| Total | | | 79 | 1387 | 1011 | .578 | 268 | 149 | .643 |

== Year-by-year results ==
Legend
National champions
Conference champions
Conference Tournament Champions
Both Regular Season and Tournament Champions

| Season | Coach | Conference record | Overall record | Notes |
W.M. Dowell (independent) (1948–1956)
| 1948 | W.M. Dowell | | 16–20 | |
| 1949 | W.M. Dowell | | 11–19 | |
| 1950 | W.M. Dowell | | 13–17 | |
W.M. Dowell (SWC) (1951–1957)
| 1951 | W.M. Dowell | | 18–12 | |
| 1952 | W.M. Dowell | | 24–6 | |
| 1953 | W.M. Dowell | | 17–13 | |
| 1954 | W.M. Dowell | | 8–22 | |
| 1955 | W.M. Dowell | | 8–22 | |
| 1956 | W.M. Dowell | | 9–21 | |
| 1957 | W.M. Dowell | | 9–21 | |
Beau Bell (SWC) (1958–1959)
| 1958 | Beau Bell | | 8–28 | |
| 1959 | Beau Bell | | 6–28 | |
Omar Smith (SWC) (1960–1974)
| 1960 | Omar Smith | | 12–24 | |
| 1961 | Omar Smith | | 4–32 | |
| 1962 | Omar Smith | | 10–26 | |
| 1963 | Omar Smith | | 14–22 | |
| 1964 | Omar Smith | | 29–7 | |
| 1965 | Omar Smith | | 17–19 | |
| 1966 | Omar Smith | | 30–6 | |
| 1967 | Omar Smith | | 12–26 | |
| 1968 | Omar Smith | | 11–25 | |
| 1969 | Omar Smith | | 21–15 | |
| 1970 | Omar Smith | | 14–22 | |
| 1971 | Omar Smith | | 23–19 | |
| 1972 | Omar Smith | | 27–15 | |
| 1973 | Omar Smith | | 27–22 | |
| 1974 | Omar Smith | | 24–24 | |
Richard Barker (SWC) (1978–1996)
| 1975 | Richard Barker | | 13–7 | |
| 1976 | Richard Barker | | 13–13 | |
| 1977 | Richard Barker | | 10–15 | |
David Kent (SWC) (1978–1996)
| 1978 | David Kent | 3–5 | 9–12 | |
| 1979 | David Kent | 3–5 | 11–11 | |
| 1980 | David Kent | 4–4 | 19–8 | |
| 1981 | David Kent | 3–5 | 19–9 | |
| 1982 | David Kent | 4–4 | 22–8 | |
| 1983 | David Kent | 3–5 | 22–9 | |
| 1984 | David Kent | 4–4 | 24–10 | |
| 1985 | David Kent | 5–3 | 21–10 | NCAA First Round |
| 1986 | David Kent | 4–4 | 17–12 | |
| 1987 | David Kent | 4–3 | 16–8 | |
| 1988 | David Kent | 4–3 | 15–8 | |
| 1989 | David Kent | 2–5 | 9–14 | |
| 1990 | David Kent | 3–4 | 18–7 | |
| 1991 | David Kent | 4–3 | 17–10 | |
| 1992 | David Kent | 5–2 | 17–6 | |
| 1993 | David Kent | 4–2 | 14–10 | |
| 1994 | David Kent | 5–1 | 23–4 | NCAA Region VI Championships |
| 1995 | David Kent | 4–2 | 14–10 | NCAA Region VI Championships |
| 1996 | David Kent | 4–2 | 20–7 | NCAA Region VI Championships |
Tim Cass (Big 12) (1997–2006)
| 1997 | Tim Cass | 3–6 | 9–14 | NCAA Region VI Championships |
| 1998 | Tim Cass | 7–2 | 19–6 | NCAA Region VI Championships |
| 1999 | Tim Cass | 6–2 | 15–7 | NCAA Round of 32 |
| 2000 | Tim Cass | 7–1 | 24–6 | NCAA Round of 16 |
| 2001 | Tim Cass | 8–0 | 27–4 | NCAA Quarterfinals |
| 2002 | Tim Cass | 5–2 | 22–7 | NCAA Round of 16 |
| 2003 | Tim Cass | 4–3 | 23–10 | NCAA Round of 16 |
| 2004 | Tim Cass | 8–2 | 24–9 | NCAA Round of 16 |
| 2005 | Tim Cass | 5–2 | 17–9 | NCAA Round of 16 |
| 2006 | Tim Cass | 4–3 | 16–11 | NCAA First Round |
Steve Denton (Big 12) (2007–2012)
| 2007 | Steve Denton | 1–5 | 15–12 | NCAA Round of 32 |
| 2008 | Steve Denton | 2–4 | 13–12 | NCAA Round of 32 |
| 2009 | Steve Denton | 5–1 | 17–9 | NCAA Round of 16 |
| 2010 | Steve Denton | 5–1 | 25–7 | NCAA Round of 16 |
| 2011 | Steve Denton | 5–1 | 29–6 | NCAA Round of 16 |
| 2012 | Steve Denton | 1–4 | 14–15 | |
Steve Denton (SEC) (2013–present)
| 2013 | Steve Denton | 7–5 | 19–13 | NCAA Round of 16 |
| 2014 | Steve Denton | 10–2 | 25–7 | NCAA Round of 32 |
| 2015 | Steve Denton | 11–1 | 24–5 | NCAA Quarterfinals |
| 2016 | Steve Denton | 8–4 | 27–10 | NCAA Round of 32 |
| 2017 | Steve Denton | 11–1 | 21–7 | NCAA Round of 16 |
| 2018 | Steve Denton | 12–0 | 26–6 | NCAA Semifinals |
| 2019 | Steve Denton | 10–2 | 21–8 | NCAA Round of 32 |
| 2020 | Steve Denton | 4–0 | 12–3 | Cancelled due to COVID-19 pandemic |
| 2021 | Steve Denton | 7–5 | 19–9 | NCAA Quarterfinals |
| 2022 | Steve Denton | 7–5 | 22–14 | NCAA Round of 32 |
| 2023 | Steve Denton | 7–5 | 19–12 | NCAA Round of 32 |
| 2024 | Steve Denton | 7–5 | 20–11 | NCAA Round of 16 |
| 2025 | Steve Denton | 9–5 | 18–11 | NCAA Round of 16 |
| 2026 | Steve Denton | 10–4 | 20–10 | NCAA Round of 32 |

== NCAA Doubles Champions ==
| Year | Recipient |
|---|---|
| 2011 | Jeff Dadamo/Austin Krajicek |

== Individual honors ==
=== National Athletes of the Year ===
ITA Player of the Year
| Year | Recipient |
|---|---|
| 2010 | Austin Krajicek |

=== Conference Athletes of the Year ===
Player of the Year
| Year | Recipient | Conference |
|---|---|---|
| 1993 | Mark Weaver | SWC |
| 2000 | Shuon Madden | Big 12 |
| 2001 | Shuon Madden | Big 12 |
| 2010 | Austin Krajicek | Big 12 |
| 2011 | Austin Krajicek | Big 12 |
| 2021 | Valentin Vacherot | SEC |

Newcomer of the Year
| Year | Recipient | Conference |
|---|---|---|
| 2000 | Ryan Newport | Big 12 |
| 2001 | Tres Davis | Big 12 |
| 2002 | Ante Matijevic | Big 12 |
| 2004 | Mohamed Dakki | Big 12 |
| 2008 | Austin Krajicek | Big 12 |
| 2010 | Jeff Dadamo | Big 12 |

Freshman of the Year
| Year | Recipient | Conference |
|---|---|---|
| 1998 | Rafael de Mesa | Big 12 |
| 2005 | Jerry Makowski | Big 12 |
| 2006 | Conner Pollock | Big 12 |
| 2008 | Austin Krajicek | Big 12 |

=== Conference Coach of the Year ===
| Year | Recipient | Conference |
|---|---|---|
| 1994 | David Kent | SWC |
| 1998 | Tim Cass | Big 12 |
| 2000 | Tim Cass | Big 12 |
| 2001 | Tim Cass | Big 12 |
| 2009 | Steve Denton | Big 12 |
| 2011 | Steve Denton | Big 12 |
| 2014 | Steve Denton | SEC |
| 2015 | Steve Denton | SEC |

== Olympic medalists ==
| Year | Recipient | Event | Medal type |
|---|---|---|---|
| 2024 | Austin Krajicek | Men's doubles | Silver |

== See also ==
- Texas A&M Aggies
