= Tennessee Volunteers men's tennis =

Sports organization

Tennessee Volunteers tennis
- Founded: 1932
- University: University of Tennessee
- Athletic director: Danny White
- Head coach: Chris Woodruff (8th season)
- Conference: SEC
- Location: Knoxville, Tennessee, US
- Home Court: Barksdale Stadium (Capacity: 2,000)
- Nickname: Volunteers
- Colors: Orange, white, and smokey gray

NCAA Tournament runner-up
- 1990, 2001, 2010

NCAA Tournament Semifinals
- 1987, 1990, 2000, 2001, 2002, 2010, 2021, 2022

NCAA Tournament Quarterfinals
- 1987, 1990, 2000, 2001, 2002, 2010, 2011, 2013, 2021, 2022, 2024

NCAA Tournament Round of 16
- 1979, 1980, 1987, 1988, 1990, 1991, 1993, 2000, 2001, 2002, 2005, 2008, 2009, 2010, 2011, 2013, 2014, 2019, 2021, 2022, 2023, 2024, 2025

NCAA Tournament Round of 32
- 1989, 1998, 1999, 2000, 2001, 2002, 2004, 2005, 2007, 2008, 2009, 2010, 2011, 2012, 2013, 2014, 2018, 2019, 2021, 2022, 2023, 2024, 2025

NCAA Tournament appearances
- 1979, 1980, 1987, 1988, 1989, 1990, 1991, 1993, 1994, 1995, 1996, 1997, 1998, 1999, 2000, 2001, 2002, 2004, 2005, 2007, 2008, 2009, 2010, 2011, 2012, 2013, 2014, 2015, 2018, 2019, 2021, 2022, 2023, 2024, 2025

Conference Tournament championships
- 1990, 2002, 2010, 2021

Conference regular season champions
- 1951, 1966, 1970, 1980, 1986, 1990, 2000, 2010, 2011

The Tennessee Volunteer men's tennis team represents the University of Tennessee, in Knoxville, TN. The program has appeared in 33 NCAA Tournaments. Additionally, the Vols have won 9 SEC Championships, 4 SEC Tournaments, and finished as national runner-up three times. Prominent ATP players who came to Tennessee include Doug Flach, Tennys Sandgren, John-Patrick Smith, Chris Woodruff, Paul Annacone, Michael Fancutt, and Mike De Palmer. They are currently coached by former Tennessee and ATP, Chris Woodruff.

== History ==
=== Sam Winterbotham era ===
Sam Winterbotham was formerly the head coach of the Colorado Buffaloes men's tennis team from 2002–2006. After the 2006 season Colorado cut the men's tennis team due to budget constrains, and Winterbotham was subsequently named the 10th coach in Tennessee tennis history on October 24, 2006.

He and his assistant Chris Woodruff joined forces when Tennessee was ranked No. 48 nationally, but the Vols quickly vaulted up the charts. From 2007-2015 Winterbotham led Tennessee to nine consecutive NCAA tournament appearances, including six appearances in the NCAA Round of 16, three appearances in the NCAA Quarterfinals, and one national championship appearance where they lost in a close match to USC 4-2.

Winterbotham became the first head coach at Tennessee to win consecutive SEC regular season championships in 2010 and 2011. In 2010, the Vols finished 11–0 in Southeastern Conference and went on to become the first team to capture the SEC Tournament Title courtesy of three 4–0 shutouts. Three players—John-Patrick Smith, Rhyne Williams and Davey Sandgren—earned All-America honors. For the first time in Tennessee history, five Vols were named All-SEC. Five players also finished the year in the national ITA rankings.

In terms of sheer number of victories, from 2008 to 2011 the team wrapped up their most successful three-year period in program history with a 101–18 (.849) record, and year-end Top 19 rankings each season. The Vols went 31-2 in 2010, won 23 matches in 2008 and 2009, and claimed 24 wins in 2011.

In 2014 Winterbotham coached doubles pair Mikelis Libietis and Hunter Reese all the way to the 2014 NCAA doubles title. After 11 years of coaching UT, as well as a 217-104 match record, Sam Winterbotham was fired on May 4, 2017 at the conclusion of the 2017 season. The Vols had struggled and missed the NCAA Tournament for two consecutive years in 2016 and 2017. In Winterbothams last two years at Tennessee he had a combined 25-31 record and the Vols were 3-21 in SEC play.

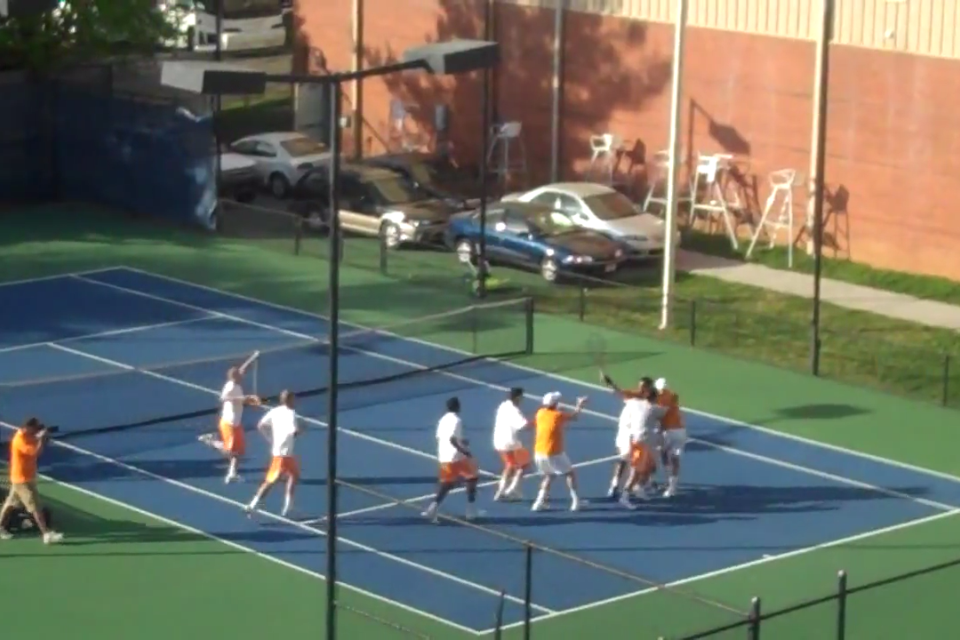
The Tennessee Vols tennis team finishing a match at Barksdale Stadium

=== Chris Woodruff era ===
Winterbotham was replaced by long term assistant and former NCAA Singles Champion at Tennessee Chris Woodruff. In Woodruff's first season as head coach he led the Vols to a 21-9 record and 4th place in the SEC regular season standings with an 8-4 conference record. Tennessee made the semifinals of the SEC tournament losing to Texas A&M 4-0. The Vols returned to the NCAA tournament for the first time since 2015 beating UNC Wilmington 4-0 in the first round before losing to North Carolina 4-0 in the NCAA round of 32.

In the 2019 season, Woodruff led Tennessee to the SEC title game, where they fell to #6 ranked Mississippi State. As the NCAA Tournament’s #14 seed, Tennessee fell in NCAA round of 16 to #3 seed Florida. They ended the season with a 22-8 overall record, and an 8-4 record in-conference.

Tennessee was ranked #19, with a 14-2 record, when the 2020 season was cancelled due to the COVID-19 pandemic.

In the 2021 season, Tennessee defeated #13 Ole Miss, #12 South Carolina, and #1 ranked Florida in consecutive days to win their first SEC Tournament since 2010, and entered the NCAA tournament as the #3 overall seed with a 24-3 record, and a 10-2 conference record. In the NCAA Tournament, the Vols beat Alabama A&M 5-0 and Memphis 4-0 in the round of 64 and 32. At the USTA National Campus in Orlando, Tennessee went on to defeat Arizona 4-3 in the NCAA round of 16, and #11 Georgia in the Elite 8. The team season ended with a 4-2 loss to #2 Baylor in the final four, concluding the year with a 28-4 record. One week later, Tennessee players Patrick Harper and Adam Walton won the NCAA individual doubles championship for the program's first individual title since 2014.

The Volunteers continued their run as a national power in the 2022 season, where they defeated #12 Texas A&M, #13 South Carolina, and #3 Baylor to advance to the ITA Indoor Championship. Despite losing to #4 TCU in the finals, Tennessee returned to the #1 overall ranking which they maintained for several weeks. Despite struggling down the stretch and finishing 5th in the SEC with a conference record of 8-4, Tennessee made the semifinals of the SEC tournament and entered the NCAA tournament as the #6 overall seed. Hosting the first three rounds, the Vols defeated Tennessee Tech, Duke, and Florida State to advance to the NCAA final site destination hosted by Illinois. In the Elite 8, Tennessee got revenge from the previous season against #3 Baylor by winning 4-3, sending the Vols to the Final Four for the second consecutive season. There, eventual national champion and #7 seed Virginia ended the teams hope for their first national title. Tennessee finished with a final record of 26-8.

2023 saw the Vols return to the ITA Indoor Championships for the 3rd consecutive year, where they lost 4-3 in a re-match of the 2022 NCAA semifinals with #5 Virginia before defeating #17 Stanford and Illinois in consolation rounds. In other notable non-conference matches, Tennessee lost to #5 Michigan Wolverines(4-1), and #14 Wake Forest (4-3), but defeated #9 Columbia (4-1). The Vols recorded ranked SEC wins over #12 Mississippi State (5-2), #4 Kentucky (4-0), #20 Florida (4-3), #5 South Carolina (6-1), and #25 Ole Miss (6-1). A pair of narrow 4-3 loses to #14 Auburn and #10 Georgia, put Tennessee at 2nd in the SEC with a 10-2 conference record. In the SEC Tournament, the second seeded Volunteers beat No. 7 seed Ole Miss, before falling in the semifinals to the No. 3 seed and eventual tournament champion, #5 Kentucky 4-3. The Vols were selected as a regional host site for the 4th year in a row, defeating Belmont and Wake Forest to advance to the Super Regionals. At the Knoxville Super Regional, the season came to an end with a close 4-2 loss to the No. 9 seed South Carolina.

The 2024 and 2025 seasons saw Tennessee reach the Quarterfinals and Round of 16, falling to Texas both years. The program has advanced to at least the Round of 16 for 6 consecutive seasons (2019-2025 with 2020 cancelled), the longest such streak in program history.

== Head coaches ==
#	Coach	Years	Seasons	Overall			Conference			SEC Titles	NCAA Appearances
#	Coach	Years	Seasons	Won	Lost	%	Won	Lost	%	SEC Titles	NCAA Appearances
1	Hugh D. Faust	1932-1942	11	68	38	.640	4	23	.148	–	–
2	Jack Rogers	1947	1	5	2	.714	0	2	.000	–	–
3	W.D. Buchanan	1948-1960	12	95	72	.568	43	49	.467	1	–
4	James Kalshoven	1961	1	8	6	.571	1	4	.200	–	–
5	Duane Bruley	1962	1	7	7	.500	0	5	.000	–	–
6	Tommy Barlett	1963-1966	4	54	11	.831	19	5	.791	1	–
7	Earl Baumgardner	1967	1	13	4	.765	5	2	.714	–	–
8	Louis Royal	1968-1976	9	121	68	.639	37	24	.606	1	–
9	John Newman	1977-1980	4	51	31	.622	19	10	.655	1	2
10	Mike DePalmer Sr.	1981-1994	14	299	119	.715	97	55	.638	3	6
11	John Kreis	1995-1997	3	35	37	.486	12	26	.316	–	2
12	Michael Fancutt	1998-2004	7	123	57	.683	46	31	.597	2	6
13	Chris Mahony	2005-2006	2	25	20	.556	9	13	.409	–	1
14	Sam Winterbotham	2007-2017	11	217	104	.676	72	54	.571	3	9
15	Chris Woodruff	2018-pres.	8	157	48	.775	55	26	.730	1	7
Total			89	1302	631	.678	574	377	.603	13	33

== Yearly record ==
Season	Coach	Record		Conference standing	Conference tournament	ITA rank	Postseason
Season	Coach	Overall	Conference	Conference standing	Conference tournament	ITA rank	Postseason
Southeastern Conference
1932	Hugh D. Faust	5-1	–	–	–	–	–
1933	Hugh D. Faust	6-2	0-1	–	–	–	–
1934	Hugh D. Faust	4-5	0-4	–	–	–	–
1935	Hugh D. Faust	6-3	–	–	–	–	–
1936	Hugh D. Faust	5-7	0-4	–	–	–	–
1937	Hugh D. Faust	6-5	1-3	–	–	–	–
1938	Hugh D. Faust	4-6-1	1-3	–	–	–	–
1939	Hugh D. Faust	6-4	0-3	–	–	–	–
1940	Hugh D. Faust	7-4	0-3	–	–	–	–
1941	Hugh D. Faust	8-6	0-2	–	–	–	–
1942	Hugh D. Faust	10-0	2-0	–	–	–	–
1943-1946 No Team
1947	Jack Rogers	5-2	0-2	–	–	–	–
1948	W.D. Buchanan	5-5	2-3	–	–	–	–
1949	W.D. Buchanan	1-9	0-5	–	–	–	–
1950	W.D. Buchanan	10-4	6-3	T-2nd	–	–	–
1951	W.D. Buchanan	10-0-1	6-0	Champions	–	–	–
1952	W.D. Buchanan	11-0	8-0	2nd	–	–	–
1953	W.D. Buchanan	11-3	6-3	T-4th	–	–	–
1954	W.D. Buchanan	4-6-1	1-5-1	6th	–	–	–
1955	W.D. Buchanan	8-6	3-5	6th	–	–	–
1956	W.D. Buchanan	4-9	2-6	8th	–	–	–
1957	W.D. Buchanan	5-7	1-6	7th	–	–	–
1958	W.D. Buchanan	9-9	2-5	8th	–	–	–
1959	W.D. Buchanan	9-6	2-5	8th	–	–	–
1960	W.D. Buchanan	8-8	4-4	6th	–	–	–
1961	James Kalshoven	8-6	1-4	–	–	–	–
1962	Duane Bruley	7-7	0-5	10th	–	–	–
1963	Tommy Bartlett	10-5	2-4	10th	–	–	–
1964	Tommy Bartlett	13-1	3-0	8th	–	–	–
1965	Tommy Bartlett	15-3	7-1	4th	–	–	–
1966	Tommy Bartlett	16-2	7-0	Champions	–	–	–
1967	Earl Baumgardner	13-4	5-2	2nd	–	–	–
1968	Louis Royal	12-7-1	3-3-1	4th	–	–	–
1969	Louis Royal	6-8	3-2	5th	–	–	–
1970	Louis Royal	14-7	4-1	Champions	–	–	–
1971	Louis Royal	14-7-1	5-4	2nd	–	–	–
1972	Louis Royal	27-2	5-1	T-2nd	–	–	–
1973	Louis Royal	10-9	3-2	5th	–	–	–
1974	Louis Royal	17-6	6-2	2nd	–	–	–
1975	Louis Royal	14-12	5-4	3rd	–	–	–
1976	Louis Royal	6-10	3-5	7th	–	–	–
1977	John Newman	9-12	3-6	6th	–	–	–
1978	John Newman	18-7	6-3	2nd	–	–	–
1979	John Newman	13-6	4-1	2nd	–	–	NCAA Round of 16
1980	John Newman	14-6	6-0	Champions	–	–	NCAA Round of 16
1981	Mike DePalmer Sr.	14-6	6-2	4th	–	–	–
1982	Mike DePalmer Sr.	21-9	10-1	2nd	–	–	–
1983	Mike DePalmer Sr.	20-4	12-7	3rd	–	–	–
1984	Mike DePalmer Sr.	23-8	6-2	4th	–	–	–
1985	Mike DePalmer Sr.	27-11	7-2	3rd	–	–	–
1986	Mike DePalmer Sr.	24-10	3-6	Champions	–	14th	–
1987	Mike DePalmer Sr.	24-6	7-2	2nd	–	3rd	NCAA Semifinal
1988	Mike DePalmer Sr.	14-11	6-3	4th	–	13th	NCAA Round of 16
1989	Mike DePalmer Sr.	20-8	6-3	10th	–	14th	NCAA First Round
1990	Mike DePalmer Sr.	34-1	9-0	Champions	Champions	2nd	NCAA Runner-up
1991	Mike DePalmer Sr.	21-11	7-4	T-3rd	First Round	10th	NCAA Round of 16
1992	Mike DePalmer Sr.	15-13	4-9	T-8th	Quarterfinal	18th	–
1993	Mike DePalmer Sr.	27-11	7-7	6th	Semifinal	11th	NCAA Round of 16
1994	Mike DePalmer Sr.	15-10	6-7	6th	Quarterfinal	13th	NCAA Regional Second Round
1995	John Kreis	17-9	7-6	6th	Quarterfinal	16th	NCAA Regional Second Round
1996	John Kreis	11-11	5-8	8th	Quarterfinal	26th	NCAA First Round
1997	John Kreis	5-17	0-12	12th	First Round	59th	NCAA First Round
1998	Michael Fancutt	14-7	6-5	5th	Quarterfinal	19th	NCAA Second Round
1999	Michael Fancutt	18-10	6-5	5th	Quarterfinal	13th	NCAA Second Round
2000	Michael Fancutt	23-6	10-1	Champions	Semifinal	3rd	NCAA Semifinal
2001	Michael Fancutt	23-6	9-2	2nd	Final	2nd	NCAA Runner-up
2002	Michael Fancutt	22-7	7-4	T-2nd (East)	Champions	6th	NCAA Semifinal
2003	Michael Fancutt	9-12	2-9	6th (East)	First Round	55th	–
2004	Michael Fancutt	14-9	6-5	4th (East)	First Round	21st	NCAA Second Round
2005	Chris Mahony	16-9	6-5	T-3rd (East)	Final	11th	NCAA Round of 16
2006	Chris Mahony	9-11	3-8	5th (East)	First Round	50th	–
2007	Sam Winterbotham	17-8	7-4	T-2nd (East)	Second Round	25th	NCAA Second Round
2008	Sam Winterbotham	23-4	9-2	T-2nd (East)	Semifinal	9th	NCAA Round of 16
2009	Sam Winterbotham	23-7	8-3	2nd (East)	Final	8th	NCAA Round of 16
2010	Sam Winterbotham	31-2	11-0	Champions	Champions	2nd	NCAA Runner-up
2011	Sam Winterbotham	24-5	10-1	Champions	Semifinal	4th	NCAA Quarterfinal
2012	Sam Winterbotham	15-14	5-6	4th (East)	Quarterfinal	20th	NCAA Second Round
2013	Sam Winterbotham	26-9	8-4	2nd (East)	Final	6th	NCAA Quarterfinal
2014	Sam Winterbotham	19-11	6-6	6th	Second Round	18th	NCAA Round of 16
2015	Sam Winterbotham	14-13	5-7	8th	Quarterfinal	43rd	NCAA First Round
2016	Sam Winterbotham	12-17	0-12	13th	Second Round	–	–
2017	Sam Winterbotham	13-14	3-9	8th	Quarterfinal	43rd	–
2018	Chris Woodruff	21-9	8-4	4th	Semifinal	20th	NCAA Second Round
2019	Chris Woodruff	22-8	8-4	4th	Final	13th	NCAA Round of 16
2020	Chris Woodruff	14-2	2-1	–	–	12th	Postseason not held (COVID-19)
2021	Chris Woodruff	28-4	10-2	2nd	Champions	4th	NCAA Semifinal
2022	Chris Woodruff	26-8	8-4	5th	Semifinal	6th	NCAA Semifinal
2023	Chris Woodruff	23-8	10-2	2nd	Semifinal	9th	NCAA Round of 16
2024	Chris Woodruff	25-7	10-2	2nd	Semifinal	7th	NCAA Quarterfinals
2025	Chris Woodruff	22-9	9-5	T-4th	Semifinal	14th	NCAA Round of 16
Total		1302-631-5	574-377-2	9	4		33 NCAA Appearances

== NCAA Tournament Results ==
In the NCAA Tournament, Tennessee holds a 56-31 record overall, including a 27-1 record when hosting the first two rounds in Knoxville. Overall they boast a 34-9 record in first and second round matches. From the Round of 16, on they hold a 21-22 record.

Year	Seed	Round	Opponent	Result
1979		Round of 16	California	L 8-1
1980		Round of 16	Trinity (TX)	L 5-4
1987	#5	Round of 16; Quarterfinal; Semifinal	#12 South Carolina #4 Long Beach State #1 UCLA	W 5-3; W 5-3; L 5-2
1988	#13	First Round; Round of 16	TCU #4 Pepperdine	W 5-2; L 5-1
1989	#13	First Round	Oklahoma State	L 5-4
1990	#1	Round of 16; Quarterfinal; Semifinal; Championship	#16 UC-Irvine #9 Miami (FL) #4 UCLA #2 Stanford	W 5-2; W 5-2; W 5-4; L 5-2
1991	#11	Round of 16	#6 Florida	L 5-2
1993	#11	Round of 16	#6 Texas	L 5-1
1994		Regional QF; Regional SF	Kentucky; Miami (FL)	W 4-1; L 4-2
1995		Regional QF; Regional SF	Auburn; Kentucky	W 4-2; L 4-2
1996		First Round	UAB	L 4-0
1997		First Round	#11 Florida	L 5-0
1998		First Round; Second Round	South Florida #12 Auburn	W 4-1; L 4-3
1999	#11	First Round; Second Round	Tennessee Tech; Mississippi State	W 4-0; L 4-3
2000	#10	First Round; Second Round; Round of 16; Quarterfinal; Semifinal	Chattanooga; North Carolina #7 Texas A&M #2 UCLA; VCU	W 4-0; W 4-2; W 4-3; W 4-1; L 4-3
2001	#8	First Round; Second Round; Round of 16; Quarterfinal; Semifinal; Championship	UMBC; Ohio State; South Alabama #1 Stanford #5 TCU #3 Georgia	W 4-0; W 4-1; W 4-0; W 4-2; W 4-0; L 4-1
2002	#2	First Round; Second Round; Round of 16; Quarterfinal; Semifinal	Wake Forest; Virginia Tech #15 Texas #7 Kentucky #11 USC	W 4-0; W 4-0; W 4-0; W 4-1; L 4-3
2004	#15	First Round; Second Round	Wichita State; Arkansas	W 4-1; L 4-1
2005	#10	First Round; Second Round; Round of 16	ETSU; Ohio State #7 UCLA	W 4-0; W 4-2; L 4-1
2007		First Round; Second Round	Miami (FL) #2 Ohio State	W 4-3; L 4-1
2008	#8	First Round; Second Round; Round of 16	Furman; Virginia Tech #9 Baylor	W 4-0; W 4-0; L 4-1
2009	#5	First Round; Second Round; Round of 16	ETSU; Duke #12 Texas	W 4-0; W 4-1; L 4-3
2010	#2	First Round; Second Round; Round of 16; Quarterfinal; Semifinal; Championship	Winthrop; ETSU #15 Louisville #7 Baylor #11 Georgia #5 USC	W 4-0; W 4-1; W 4-0; W 4-0; W 4-1; L 4-2
2011	#3	First Round; Second Round; Round of 16; Quarterfinal	Radford; Virginia Tech #14 California #6 Georgia	W 4-0; W 4-0; W 4-2; L 4-3
2012		First Round; Second Round	UNC Wilmington #15 North Carolina	W 4-1; L 4-0
2013	#7	First Round; Second Round; Round of 16; Quarterfinal	South Carolina State; Clemson #10 Mississippi State #2 Virginia	W 4-0; W 4-3; W 4-2; L 4-0
2014		First Round; Second Round; Round of 16	Elon #11 Duke #6 UCLA	W 4-1; W 4-2; L 4-0
2015		First Round	Stanford	L 4-2
2018		First Round; Second Round	UNC Wilmington #7 North Carolina	W 4-0; L 4-0
2019	#14	First Round; Second Round; Round of 16	Radford; NC State #3 Florida	W 4-0; W 4-2; L 4-2
2021	#3	First Round; Second Round; Round of 16; Quarterfinal; Semifinal	Alabama A&M; Memphis; Arizona #11 Georgia #2 Baylor	W 5-0; W 4-0; W 4-3; W 4-1; L 4-2
2022	#6	First Round; Second Round; Round of 16; Quarterfinal; Semifinal	Tennessee Tech; Duke; Florida State #3 Baylor #7 Virginia	W 4-0; W 4-1; W 4-0; W 4-3; L 5-0
2023	#8	First Round; Second Round; Round of 16	Belmont; Wake Forest #9 South Carolina	W 4-1; W 4-0; L 4-2
2024	#7	First Round; Second Round; Round of 16; Quarterfinal	ETSU; Memphis #10 Florida State #2 Texas	W 4-0; W 4-0; W 4-3; L 4-2
2025	#14	First Round; Second Round; Round of 16	Alabama State; Duke #3 Texas	W 4-0; W 4-3; L 4-0

== See also ==
- Tennessee Lady Volunteers tennis
