= TCU Horned Frogs men's tennis =

- Founded: 1974
- University: Texas Christian University
- Head coach: David Roditi (14th season)
- Conference: Big 12
- Location: Fort Worth, Texas, US
- Home Court: Bayard H. Friedman Tennis Center,
- Nickname: Horned Frogs
- Colors: Purple and white

NCAA Tournament championships
- 2024

NCAA Tournament runner-up
- 2025

NCAA Tournament Semifinals
- 1989, 1996, 2001, 2015, 2023, 2024, 2025, 2026

NCAA Tournament Quarterfinals
- 1982, 1989, 1994, 1995, 1996, 2000, 2001, 2015, 2017, 2019, 2021, 2022, 2023, 2024, 2025, 2026

NCAA Tournament Round of 16
- 1977, 1982, 1987, 1989, 1991, 1992, 1993, 1994, 1995, 1996, 2000, 2001, 2004, 2015, 2016, 2017, 2018, 2019, 2021, 2022, 2023, 2024, 2025, 2026

NCAA Tournament Round of 32
- 1982, 1987, 1988, 1989, 1991, 1992, 1993, 1994, 1995, 1996, 1999, 2000, 2001, 2003, 2004, 2006, 2015, 2016, 2017, 2018, 2019, 2021, 2022, 2023, 2024, 2025, 2026

NCAA Tournament appearances
- 1977, 1982, 1987, 1988, 1989, 1991, 1992, 1993, 1994, 1995, 1996, 1997, 1998, 1999, 2000, 2001, 2002, 2003, 2004, 2005, 2006, 2008, 2009, 2010, 2013, 2015, 2016, 2017, 2018, 2019, 2021, 2022, 2023, 2024, 2025, 2026

Conference Tournament championships
- SWC: 1988, 1989, 1991, 1992, 1994, 1995, 1996; WAC: 1997, 2000; CUSA: 2001; MWC: 2006, 2008, 2010; Big 12: 2016, 2017, 2023, 2026

Conference regular season champions
- SWC: 1989, 1991, 1992, 1994; WAC: 1996; MWC: 2008, 2009; Big 12: 2016, 2017, 2018, 2021, 2022, 2025

The TCU Horned Frogs men's tennis team represents Texas Christian University in NCAA Division I college tennis. The team is part of the Big 12 Conference and plays home matches at the Bayard H. Friedman Tennis Center in Fort Worth, Texas. The Horned Frogs are currently led by head coach David Roditi, who was a three-time All-American in his playing days at TCU.

== History ==
TCU first fielded a varsity men's tennis team in 1974 under Bernard "Tut" Bartzen, who would go on to amass more than 500 victories in his 25 years as head coach. The Frogs made their first NCAA Tournament appearance in 1977, led by All-American Randy Crawford. Fifteen more Horned Frogs earned All-America honors under Bartzen, and twelve more teams made the NCAA Tournament - advancing as far as the national semifinals in 1989 and 1996.

Following Bartzen's retirement in 1998, the Frogs were led by a series of short-tenured coaches - Michael Center (1999-2000), Joey Rive (2001-2006) and Dave Borelli (2007-2010) - who combined to produce eleven NCAA Tournament appearances and five All-American players.

On September 7, 2010, TCU alum and three-time All-American David Roditi was named the program's 5th head coach. As of the 2025 season, he has led the Horned Frogs to ten NCAA Tournament appearances, including nine consecutive since 2015 (the 2020 tournament was canceled due to the COVID-19 pandemic). In 2015, TCU made the Final Four for the first time since 2001, falling to top-seeded Oklahoma. Roditi led them back to the semifinals in 2023, once again losing. TCU broke through in 2024, reaching the national championship for the first time in program history and defeating Texas to claim its first NCAA national championship. They again played for the national championship the following year, this time falling to Wake Forest, to whom they also lost the indoor championship earlier that season.

In addition to outdoor success, the Horned Frogs have found considerable indoor success under Roditi. The team has qualified for the ITA Indoor Tournament ten times, including eight consecutive trips since 2019. In 2022, the program reached the national championship for the first time, defeating Tennessee 4-1 to claim its first national championship of any kind. It would be the first of four consecutive trips to the championship round, winning again in 2023 and falling in 2024 and 2025.

== All-Americans ==
- Randy Crawford (1977)
- David Pate (1981, 1982, 1983)
- Karl Richter (1981, 1982)
- Corey Wittenberg (1983)
- Tom Mercer (1986)
- Neil Broad (1987)
- Earl Zinn (1988)
- Clinton Banducci (1988, 1989)
- Eric Lingg (1989)
- Sandon Stolle (1990)
- Tony Bujan (1990, 1992)
- Luis Ruette (1990, 1991, 1992)
- Paul Robinson (1994, 1995, 1996)
- David Roditi (1994, 1995, 1996)
- Ashley Fisher (1996, 1997)
- Jason Weir-Smith (1996, 1997)
- Esteban Carril (1999, 2000, 2001)
- Trace Fielding (2001)
- Jimmy Haney (2001)
- Rafael Abreu (2006)
- Jordan Freitas (2006)
- Cameron Norrie (2015, 2016, 2017)
- Jerry Lopez (2017)
- Reese Stalder (2017)
- Alex Rybakov (2017, 2018, 2019)
- Guillermo Nuñez (2018)
- Alastair Gray (2021)
- Luc Fomba (2021, 2022, 2023)
- Juan Carlos Aguilar (2022)
- Jacob Fearnley (2022, 2023, 2024)
- Sebastian Gorzny (2024)
- Lui Maxted (2024)
- Jack Pinnington Jones (2024)
- Pedro Vives (2024, 2025)

== Year-by-year results ==
NCAA National Champions	ITA Indoor National Champions	Conference Tournament Champions	Conference Regular Season Champions

Season	Coach	Record	National Tournaments	Final nat'l rank	Titles
1974	Tut Bartzen	13–11			
1975	Tut Bartzen	14–8			
1976	Tut Bartzen	25–10			
1977	Tut Bartzen	33–6	NCAA 1st Round	#9	
1978	Tut Bartzen	24–7		#15	
1979	Tut Bartzen	17–10		#18	
1980	Tut Bartzen	13–9		#16	
1981	Tut Bartzen	34–9		#13	
1982	Tut Bartzen	30–8	NCAA Quarterfinals	#9	
1983	Tut Bartzen	26–9		#19	
1984	Tut Bartzen	29–13			
1985	Tut Bartzen	21–14	NIT	#18	
1986	Tut Bartzen	17–8		#15	
1987	Tut Bartzen	17–8	NCAA 2nd Round	#12	
1988	Tut Bartzen	20–5	NCAA 1st Round	#14	SWC Tournament Champions
1989	Tut Bartzen	26–7	NCAA Semifinals	#4	SWC Regular Season Champions; SWC Tournament Champions
1990	Tut Bartzen	20–5		#13	
1991	Tut Bartzen	16–6	NCAA 2nd Round	#11	SWC Regular Season Champions; SWC Tournament Champions
1992	Tut Bartzen	20–4	NCAA 2nd Round	#7	SWC Regular Season Champions; SWC Tournament Champions
1993	Tut Bartzen	20–7	NCAA 2nd Round	#14	
1994	Tut Bartzen	18–5	NCAA Quarterfinals	#6	SWC Regular Season Champions; SWC Tournament Champions
1995	Tut Bartzen	25–6	NCAA Quarterfinals	#7	SWC Tournament Champions
1996	Tut Bartzen	23–3	NCAA Semifinals	#3	SWC Regular Season Champions; SWC Tournament Champions
1997	Tut Bartzen	15–12	NCAA 1st Round		WAC Tournament Champions
1998	Tut Bartzen	11–13	NCAA 1st Round	#38	
1999	Michael Center	14–7	NCAA 2nd Round	#22	
2000	Michael Center	22–5	NCAA Quarterfinals	#10	WAC Tournament Champions
2001	Joey Rive	24–4	NCAA Semifinals	#5	WAC Tournament Champions
2002	Joey Rive	13–11	NCAA 1st Round	#32	
2003	Joey Rive	15–8	NCAA 2nd Round	#21	
2004	Joey Rive	20–7	NCAA Round of 16	#18	
2005	Joey Rive	8–15	NCAA 1st Round	#49	
2006	Joey Rive	18–10	NCAA 2nd Round	#31	MWC Tournament Champions
2007	Dave Borelli	10–12		#68	
2008	Dave Borelli	21–8	NCAA 1st Round	#34	MWC Regular Season co-champions MWC Tournament Champions
2009	Dave Borelli	12–12	NCAA 1st Round	#38	MWC Regular Season Champions
2010	Dave Borelli	12–13	NCAA 1st Round	#52	MWC Tournament Champions
2011	David Roditi	13–13		#51	
2012	David Roditi	9–15			
2013	David Roditi	18–10	NCAA 1st Round	#38	
2014	David Roditi	12–12		#49	
2015	David Roditi	25–8	NCAA Semifinals; ITA Indoor Round of 16	#4	
2016	David Roditi	26–4	NCAA Round of 16; ITA Indoor Semifinals	#3	Big 12 Regular Season co-champions Big 12 Tournament Champions
2017	David Roditi	22–5	NCAA Quarterfinals	#8	Big 12 Regular Season Champions; Big 12 Tournament Champions
2018	David Roditi	20–5	NCAA Round of 16	#9	Big 12 Regular Season Champions
2019	David Roditi	22–7	NCAA Quarterfinals; ITA Indoor Quarterfinals	#9	
2020	David Roditi	12–4	Postseason canceled due to COVID-19; ITA Indoor Round of 16		
2021	David Roditi	19–8	NCAA Quarterfinals; ITA Indoor Quarterfinals	#7	Big 12 Regular Season Champions
2022	David Roditi	26-5	NCAA Quarterfinals; ITA Indoor Champions	#3	ITA Indoor National Champions; Big 12 Regular Season Champions
2023	David Roditi	26-3	NCAA Semifinals; ITA Indoor Champions	#4	ITA Indoor National Champions; Big 12 Tournament Champions
2024	David Roditi	28-4	NCAA Champions; ITA Indoor Runner-Up	#1	NCAA Division I National Champions
2025	David Roditi	27-4	NCAA Runner-Up; ITA Indoor Runner-Up	#2	Big 12 Regular Season Champions
	TOTAL	1,017-424			
