= Clemson Tigers men's tennis =

- Founded: 1907
- University: Clemson University
- Head coach: Brandon Wagner (3rd season)
- Conference: ACC
- Location: Clemson, South Carolina, US
- Home Court: Hoke Sloan Tennis Center (Capacity: 1,000)
- Colors: Orange and regalia

NCAA Tournament Quarterfinals
- 1980, 1981, 1982, 1983, 1985, 1986, 2004

NCAA Tournament appearances
- 1979, 1980, 1981, 1982, 1983, 1984, 1985, 1986, 1987, 1988, 1989, 1992, 1994, 1996, 1997, 1998, 1999, 2000, 2003, 2004, 2005, 2006, 2007, 2013, 2014, 2025, 2026

Conference Tournament championships
- 1969, 1980, 1981, 1983, 1984, 1985, 1986, 1987, 1988, 1989, 1997

Conference regular season champions
- 1969, 1971, 1979, 1980, 1981, 1983, 1984, 1985, 1986, 1987, 1989, 1990

The Clemson Tigers men's tennis team represents Clemson University in NCAA Division I tennis competition. Tennis has been played at Clemson since the early 20th century, with the team gaining varsity status in 1907. The Tigers have participated in the NCAA Tournament 27 times since dual match play began in 1977, and has been ranked in the top 25 by the Intercollegiate Tennis Association 19 times. Members of the Atlantic Coast Conference, the Tigers play their home matches at the Hoke Sloan Tennis Center.

== History ==
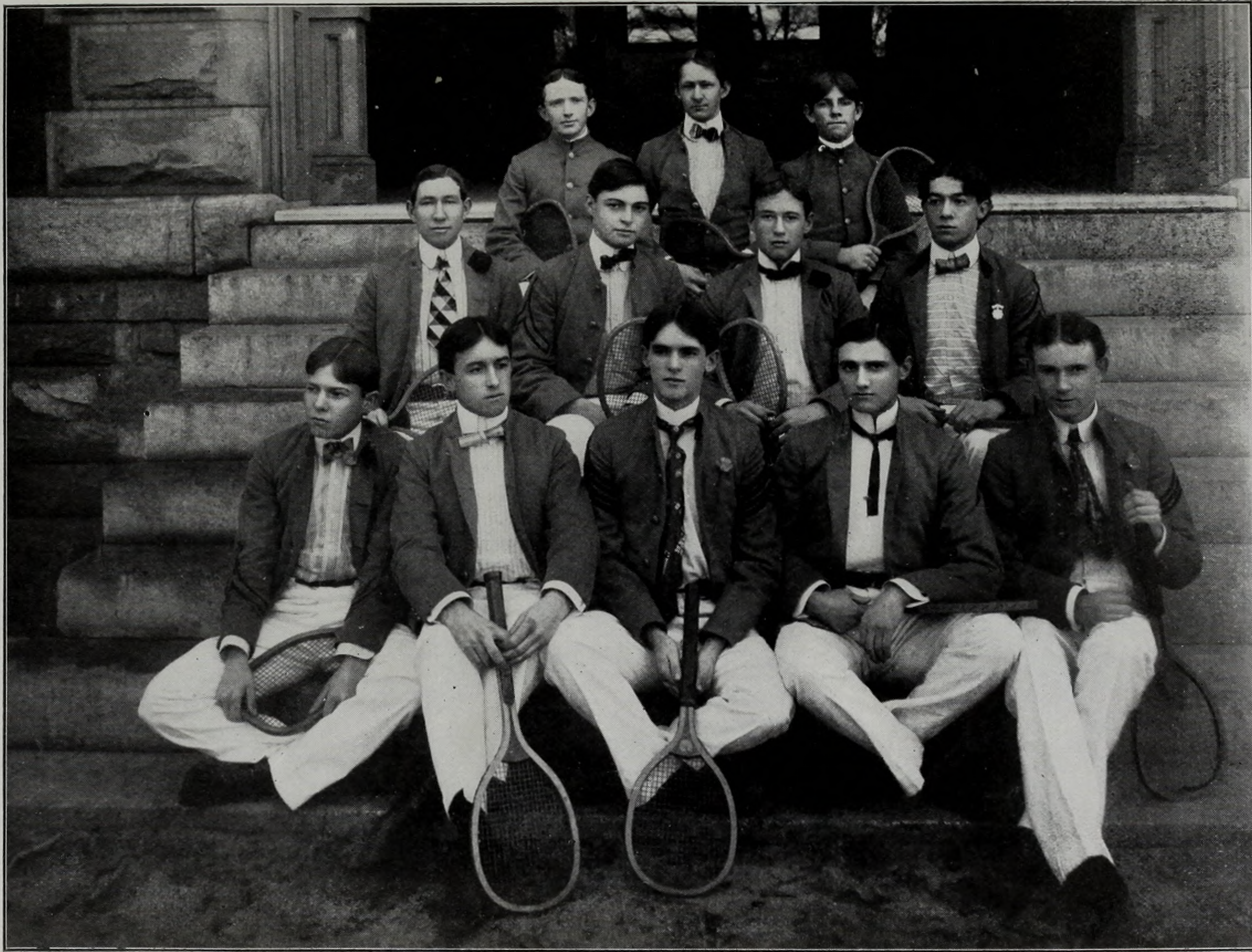
The Clemson tennis club of 1901

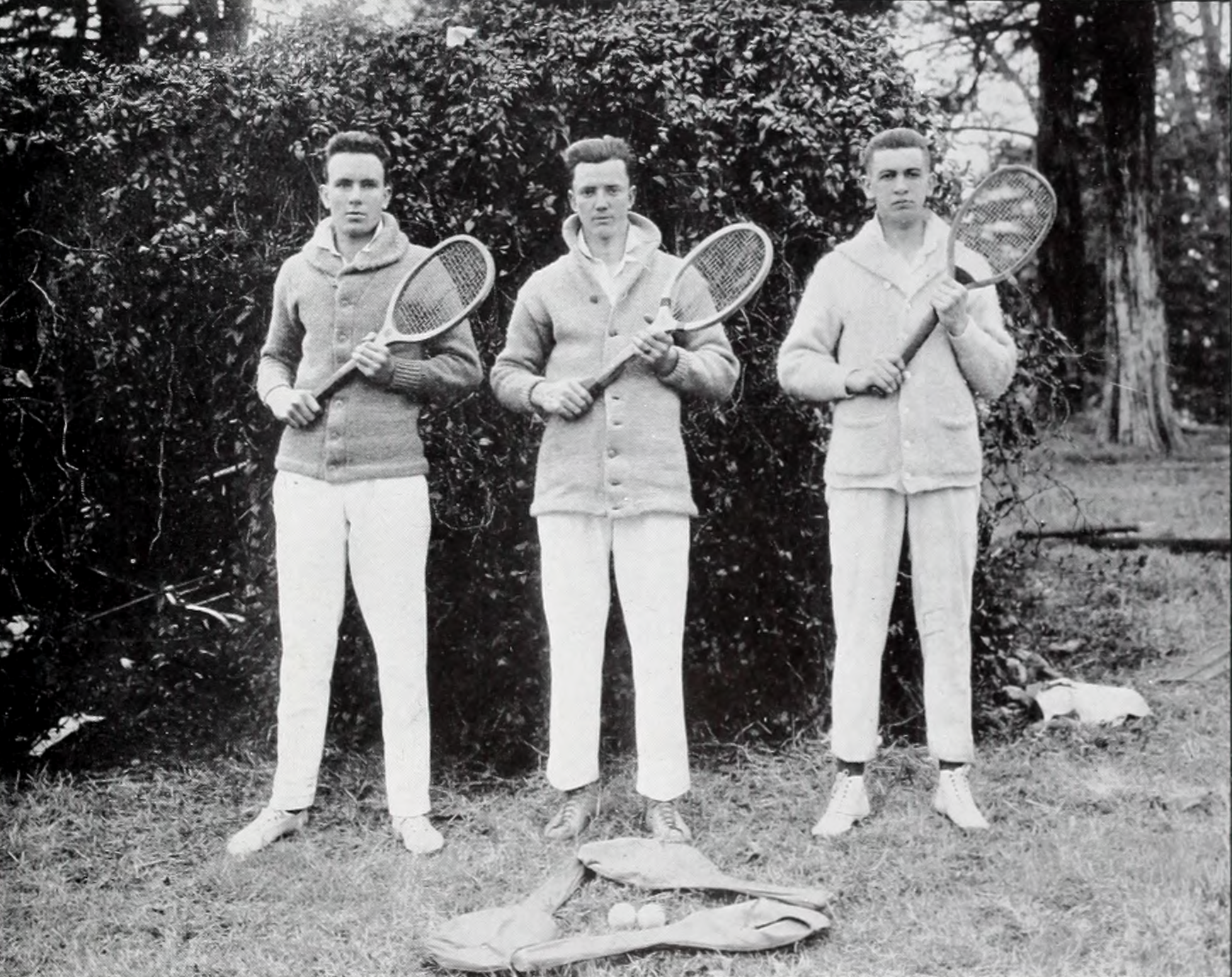
Clemson's tennis team in 1915: W. E. Blake, R. P. Thornton, and future coach Hoke Sloan.

Tennis has been played at Clemson since the university's earliest days, but the Clemson Athletic Association first sponsored a team in the 1907 South Carolina state tournament. Brothers James and John Erwin were some of Clemson's earliest stars; James won the state singles tournament in 1912 and 1913 and the Southern Intercollegiate Athletic Association singles championship in 1913, and the brothers won the SIAA doubles title in 1913. Allen Haskell and Julian Robertson won the 1917 and 1918 state tournaments in doubles.

The Tigers began competing in dual matches in 1921. The team's first coach was P. B. Holtzendorff in 1927. After not fielding a team in 1928, Hoke Sloan coached the team in 1929, beginning a 30-year run. Chemical engineering professor Duane Bruley, who had previously coached at Tennessee, took over as coach in 1963. Bruley led Clemson to their first ACC championship in 1969, posting a 16–0 record and 7–0 in conference play, and to a second conference regular season title in 1971.

Chuck Kriese was hired as head coach in 1976. In Kriese's 33 seasons, the Tigers won 10 ACC tournament championships, 10 regular season titles, and reached the NCAA Tournament 22 times. Additionally, Lawson Duncan was runner-up in the 1984 NCAA Tournament in singles.

== Year-by-Year Results ==
Record table
Season	Coach	Overall	Conference	Standing	Postseason
no coach (Southern Conference) (1921–1926)
1921		1–0			
1922		0–1			
1923		4–1			
1924		1–3			
1925		2–5–1			
1926		1–4			
P. B. Holtzendorff (Southern Conference) (1927–present)
1927	P. B. Holtzendorff	3–3–1			
Hoke Sloan (Southern Conference) (1929–1953)
1929	Hoke Sloan	0–6–2			
1930	Hoke Sloan	7–4–1			
1931	Hoke Sloan	2–6			
1934	Hoke Sloan	9–1			
1935	Hoke Sloan	7–3			
1937	Hoke Sloan	4–7			
1938	Hoke Sloan	6–3			
1939	Hoke Sloan	9–6			
1940	Hoke Sloan	14–5			
1941	Hoke Sloan	9–7			
1942	Hoke Sloan	7–3			
1943	Hoke Sloan	4–3			
1946	Hoke Sloan	7–5			
1947	Hoke Sloan	8–4			
1948	Hoke Sloan	9–8			
1949	Hoke Sloan	2–7–1			
1950	Hoke Sloan	6–7			
1951	Hoke Sloan	7–1			
1952	Hoke Sloan	9–1			
1953	Hoke Sloan	7–5			
Hoke Sloan (Atlantic Coast Conference) (1954–1958)
1954	Hoke Sloan	4–8	2–2	4th	
1955	Hoke Sloan	5–10	1–5	8th	
1956	Hoke Sloan	6–8	2–6	6th	
1957	Hoke Sloan	10–3	4–2	T-3rd	
1958	Hoke Sloan	2–7	0–5	8th	
Hoke Sloan:		160–128	9–20 (ACC)		
Les Longshore (Atlantic Coast Conference) (1959–1962)
1959	Les Longshore	9–5	3–2	3rd	
1960	Les Longshore	3–12	0–6	8th	
1961	Les Longshore	0–13	0–7	8th	
1962	Les Longshore	14–1	5–1	2nd	
Les Longshore:		26–31	8–16		
Duane Bruley (Atlantic Coast Conference) (1963–1973)
1963	Duane Bruley	13–2	6–1	2nd	
1964	Duane Bruley	9–8	5–2	3rd	
1965	Duane Bruley	15–4	5–2	T-2nd	
1966	Duane Bruley	12–4	6–1	2nd	
1967	Duane Bruley	16–2	6–1	2nd	
1968	Duane Bruley	13–4	5–2	3rd	
1969	Duane Bruley	16–0	7–0	1st	
1970	Duane Bruley	15–2	6–1	2nd	
1971	Duane Bruley	15–4	7–0	1st	
1972	Duane Bruley	14–6	4–2	3rd	
1973	Duane Bruley	12–6	4–2	T-2nd	
Duane Bruley:		150–42	61–14		
Bill Beckwith (Atlantic Coast Conference) (1974–1975)
1974	Bill Beckwith	14–9	3–3	T-3rd	
1975	Bill Beckwith	7–14	0–6	7th	
Bill Beckwith:		21–23	3–9		
Chuck Kriese (Atlantic Coast Conference) (1976–2008)
1976	Chuck Kriese	17–18	1–5	7th	
1977	Chuck Kriese	21–18	1–5	T-5th	
1978	Chuck Kriese	18–12	3–3	T-4th	
1979	Chuck Kriese	24–7	6–0	1st	NCAA first round
1980	Chuck Kriese	32–5	6–0	1st	NCAA Final 8
1981	Chuck Kriese	30–7	7–0	1st	NCAA Final 8
1982	Chuck Kriese	24–10	6–1	2nd	NCAA Final 8
1983	Chuck Kriese	29–11	7–0	1st	NCAA Final 8
1984	Chuck Kriese	27–9	7–0	1st	NCAA first round
1985	Chuck Kriese	24–12	7–0	1st	NCAA Final 8
1986	Chuck Kriese	31–7	7–0	1st	NCAA Final 8
1987	Chuck Kriese	19–14	6–0	1st	Runner-up National ITCA Indoor Championship; NCAA second round
1988	Chuck Kriese	22–9	6–1	2nd	NCAA second round
1989	Chuck Kriese	25–12	7–0	1st	NCAA second round
1990	Chuck Kriese	16–18	6–1	T-1st	
1991	Chuck Kriese	14–14	6–1	2nd	
1992	Chuck Kriese	15–11	5–3	4th	NCAA first round
1993	Chuck Kriese	9–20	3–5	T-5th	
1994	Chuck Kriese	21–12	5–3	T-4th	NCAA regional first round
1995	Chuck Kriese	21–12	6–2	T-3rd	
1996	Chuck Kriese	12–12	5–3	4th	NCAA regional first round
1997	Chuck Kriese	20–11	6–2	2nd	NCAA regional second round
1998	Chuck Kriese	11–18	3–5	7th	NCAA regional first round
1999	Chuck Kriese	21–12	6–2	T-2nd	NCAA second round
2000	Chuck Kriese	18–17	5–3	T-3rd	NCAA second round
2001	Chuck Kriese	8–20	2–6	7th	
2002	Chuck Kriese	11–18	3–5	6th	
2003	Chuck Kriese	25–11	6–2	T-2nd	NCAA second round
2004	Chuck Kriese	26–12	4–4	5th	NCAA Final 8
2005	Chuck Kriese	25–11	6–4	5th	NCAA second round
2006	Chuck Kriese	23–10	5–6	T-7th	NCAA second round
2007	Chuck Kriese	31–10	6–5	T-5th	NCAA second round
2008	Chuck Kriese	15–20	1–10	T-11th	
Chuck Kriese:		685–420	166–87		
Chuck McCuen (Atlantic Coast Conference) (2009–2016)
2009	Chuck McCuen	11–13	3–8	T-9th	
2010	Chuck McCuen	17–10	3–8	T-9th	
2011	Chuck McCuen	15–12	2–9	T-10th	
2012	Chuck McCuen	9–14	5–6	T-6th	
2013	Chuck McCuen	19–8	6–4	T-4th	NCAA second round
2014	Chuck McCuen	21–9	6–5	5th	NCAA second round
2015	Chuck McCuen	12–16	2–10	11th	
2016	Chuck McCuen	16–14	5–7		
Chuck McCuen:		120–96	32–57		
John Boetsch (Atlantic Coast Conference) (2017–2019)
2017	John Boetsch	9–16	2–10	12th	
2018	John Boetsch	10–13	3–9	11th	
2019	John Boetsch	10–17	2–10	12th	
John Boetsch:		29–46	7–29		
Robbie Weiss (Atlantic Coast Conference) (2020–2023)
2020	Robbie Weiss	7–6	0–3	—	Season cut short due to COVID-19 pandemic
2021	Robbie Weiss	10–14	2–10	T-11th	
2022	Robbie Weiss	13–14	2–10	12th	
2023	Robbie Weiss	11–15	1–11	12th	
Robbie Weiss:		41–49	5–34		
Brandon Wagner (Atlantic Coast Conference) (2024–Present)
2024	Brandon Wagner	14–14	4–8	T-8th	
2025	Brandon Wagner	22–8	8–5	8th	NCAA second round
2026	Brandon Wagner	17–13	8–5	T-5th	NCAA second round
Brandon Wagner:		53–35	20–18		
Total:		1323–918–6	319–300		
National champion Postseason invitational champion Conference regular season champion Conference regular season and conference tournament champion Division regular season champion Division regular season and conference tournament champion Conference tournament champion

== Honors ==
=== All-Americans ===
- Mike Gandolfo, Singles 1980
- Mark Dickson, Singles 1980, 1981, 1982; Doubles 1981
- Pender Murphy, Singles & Doubles 1980, 1981
- Jean Desdunes, Singles 1982, 1983
- Rick Rudeen, Singles 1983
- Lawson Duncan, Singles 1984
- Miguel Nido, Singles 1985
- Richard Matuszewski, Singles & Doubles 1985, 1986
- Brandon Walters, Doubles 1985, 1986
- Jay Berger, Singles 1986
- Craig Boynton, Doubles 1987
- Kent Kinnear, Doubles 1987
- John Sullivan, Doubles 1987; Singles 1989
- Vince van Gelderen, Doubles 1987, 1989
- Todd Watkins, Doubles 1989
- Bruce Li, Doubles 1996
- Mitch Sprengelmeyer, Doubles 1996; Singles 1997
- Nathan Thompson, Doubles 2004
- Jarmaine Jenkins, Doubles 2004
- Clément Reix, Singles 2006
- Yannick Maden, Doubles 2013
- Dominique Maden, Doubles 2013
- Hunter Harrington, Doubles 2014

=== ITA National Coach of the Year ===
- Chuck Kriese, 1981
