= 2005 NCAA Division I men's tennis championships =

- Date: May 2005
- Edition: 59th
- Location: College Station, Texas
- Venue: Mitchell Tennis Center; Texas A&M University

Champions

Men's singles
- (Germany) Benedikt Dorsch (Baylor)

Men's doubles
- (United States) John Isner / (Mexico) Antonio Ruiz (Georgia)

Men's team
- UCLA
← 2004 ·	NCAA Division I men's tennis championships	· 2006 →

The 2005 NCAA Division I men's tennis championships were the 59th annual championships hosted by the NCAA to determine the individual, doubles, and team national champions of men's collegiate tennis among its Division I member programs in the United States, culminating the 2005 NCAA Division I tennis season.

UCLA defeated defending champions Baylor in the championship match, 4–3, to claim the Bruins' sixteenth team national title and first since 1984.

== Host sites ==
This year's tournaments were played at the George P. Mitchell Tennis Center at Texas A&M University in College Station, Texas.

This was the final year that the men's and women's Division I tennis tournaments were held at separate sites; both would be held jointly at Stanford University in 2006.

== Brackets ==
=== Team ===
First round
Baylor	4
Prairie View A&M	0
Rice	3
Texas	4
Montana State	0
Texas A&M	4
Boise State	4
North Carolina	1
UC Irvine	0
Pepperdine	4
San Diego	0
Stanford	4
Duke	4
South Carolina State	0
Mississippi State	2
VCU	4
Florida	4
UCF	0
Georgia Tech	3
Vanderbilt	4
Missouri State	0
Oklahoma State	4
Oklahoma	3
South Carolina	4
Illinois	4
Quinnipiac	0
Louisville	4
Notre Dame	1
Butler	0
Kentucky	4
Ball State	0
Florida State	4
Louisiana–Lafayette	2
Tulane	4
Binghamton	0
LSU	4
Clemson	4
Northwestern	0
Georgia	4
Winthrop	0
TCU	1
Wake Forest	4
Army	0
Texas Tech	4
Auburn	4
Middle Tennessee	3
Jacksonville State	0
Ole Miss	4
Brown	0
Ohio State	4
East Tennessee State	0
Tennessee	4
California	4
San Diego State	1
Manhattan	1
UCLA	4
USC	4
SMU	1
Oral Roberts	0
Washington	4
TAMU Corpus Christi	4
William & Mary	2
Richmond	0
Virginia	4

Second round
Baylor	4
Texas	1
Texas A&M	4
Boise State	0
Pepperdine	4
Stanford	2
Duke	4
VCU	1
Florida	4
Vanderbilt	1
Oklahoma State	3
South Carolina	4
Illinois	4
Louisville	1
Kentucky	2
Florida State	4
Tulane	1
LSU	4
Clemson	0
Georgia	4
Wake Forest	1
Texas Tech	4
Auburn	1
Ole Miss	4
Ohio State	0
Tennessee	4
California	2
UCLA	4
USC	3
Washington	4
TAMU Corpus Christi	2
Virginia	4

Third round
Baylor	4
Texas A&M	0
Pepperdine	4
Duke	3
Florida	4
South Carolina	0
Illinois	2
Florida State	4
LSU	0
Georgia	4
Texas Tech	2
Ole Miss	4
Tennessee	1
UCLA	4
Washington	0
Virginia	4

Quarterfinals
Baylor	4
Pepperdine	0
Florida	4
Florida State	0
Georgia	2
Ole Miss	4
UCLA	4
Virginia	1

Semifinals
Baylor	4
Florida	1
Ole Miss	2
UCLA	4

Championship
Baylor	3
UCLA	4

== See also ==
- 2005 NCAA Division I women's tennis championships
- 2005 NCAA Division II men's tennis championships
- 2005 NCAA Division III men's tennis championships
- 2005 NAIA men's tennis championships
