= 2000 NCAA Division I men's tennis championships =

2000 NCAA Division I Men's Tennis Championships
- Date: May 2000
- Edition: 54th
- Location: Athens, Georgia
- Venue: Dan Magill Tennis Complex; University of Georgia

Champions

Men's singles
- (United States) Alex Kim (Stanford)

Men's doubles
- (United States) Cary Franklin / (United States) Graydon Oliver (Illinois)
← 1999 ·	NCAA Division I Men's Tennis Championships	· 2001 →

The 2000 NCAA Division I Men's Tennis Championships were the 54th annual championships to determine the national champions of NCAA Division I men's singles, doubles, and team collegiate tennis in the United States.

Stanford defeated Virginia Commonwealth in the championship final, 4–0, to claim the Cardinal's seventeenth team national title.

== Host sites ==
This year's tournaments were played at the Dan Magill Tennis Complex at the University of Georgia in Athens, Georgia.

The men's and women's tournaments would not be held at the same site until 2006.

== Brackets ==
=== Team ===
First round
Stanford	4
Northwestern	0
Auburn	4
California	3
Minnesota	4
Columbia	0
Indiana State	4
Purdue	1
Baylor	4
Marist	0
Louisville	3
Mississippi State	4
Hofstra	0
TCU	4
Georgia State	1
Michigan	4
Florida	4
Florida A&M	2
UAB	4
Florida Atlantic	2
Fresno State	4
Oregon	0
USC	4
Pacific	1
Duke	4
Charleston Southern	0
South Alabama	3
South Carolina	4
Middle Tennessee State	0
SMU	4
UALR	1
Georgia	4
UCLA	4
UMKC	0
New Mexico State	0
Notre Dame	4
Montana State	0
Texas	4
Boise State	3
Ohio State	4
Army	0
Texas A&M	4
Louisiana–Lafayette	4
Tulane	3
Tennessee	4
Chattanooga	0
Ball State	1
North Carolina	4
Pepperdine	4
Tulsa	0
San Diego State	4
Washington	3
Ole Miss	4
Virginia Tech	0
Virginia	0
VCU	4
Illinois	4
UMBC	0
Indiana	4
Kentucky	1
Alcorn State	0
LSU	4
Clemson	4
Miami (FL)	3

Second round
Stanford	4
Auburn	0
Minnesota	4
Indiana State	0
Baylor	4
Mississippi State	2
TCU	4
Michigan	0
Florida	4
UAB	0
Fresno State	1
USC	4
Duke	4
South Carolina	3
SMU	4
Georgia	3
UCLA	4
Notre Dame	2
Texas	4
Ohio State	1
Texas A&M	4
Louisiana–Lafayette	0
Tennessee	4
North Carolina	2
Pepperdine	2
San Diego State	4
Ole Miss	3
VCU	4
Illinois	4
Indiana	2
LSU	4
Clemson	0

Third round
Stanford	4
Minnesota	0
Baylor	1
TCU	4
Florida	4
USC	1
Duke	4
SMU	2
UCLA	4
Texas	0
Texas A&M	3
Tennessee	4
San Diego State	3
VCU	4
Illinois	4
LSU	3

Quarterfinals
Stanford	4
TCU	1
Florida	4
Duke	2
UCLA	1
Tennessee	4
VCU	4
Illinois	3

Semifinals
Stanford	4
Florida	0
Tennessee	3
VCU	4

Championship
Stanford	4
VCU	0

== See also ==
- 2000 NCAA Division I women's tennis championships
- 2000 NCAA Division II men's tennis championships
- 2000 NCAA Division III men's tennis championships
- 2000 NAIA men's tennis championships
