= 2004 NCAA Division I men's tennis championships =

- Date: May 2004
- Edition: 58th
- Location: Tulsa, Oklahoma
- Venue: Michael D. Case Tennis Center; University of Tulsa

Champions

Men's singles
- (Germany) Benjamin Becker (Baylor)

Men's doubles
- (United States) Sam Warburg / (United States) KC Corkery (Stanford)

Men's team
- Baylor
← 2003 ·	NCAA Division I men's tennis championships	· 2005 →

The 2004 NCAA Division I men's tennis championships were the 58th annual championships hosted by the NCAA to determine the individual, doubles, and team national champions of men's collegiate tennis among its Division I member programs in the United States, culminating the 2004 NCAA Division I tennis season.

Baylor defeated UCLA in the team championship final, 4–0, to claim their first national title.

This year's tournaments were played at the Michael D. Case Tennis Center at the University of Tulsa in Tulsa, Oklahoma.

The men's and women's tournaments would not be held concurrently at the same site until 2006.

== Brackets ==
=== Team ===
First round
Illinois	4
Western Michigan	0
Arizona State	4
Louisville	3
Notre Dame	0
Tulane	4
Harvard	4
Quinnipiac	0
Georgia	4
Tennessee Tech	0
Auburn	3
Texas	4
Binghamton	0
Ole Miss	4
Oregon	0
Vanderbilt	4
Fresno State	0
Pepperdine	4
Oral Roberts	0
UCLA	4
Alabama	0
Texas A&M	4
Richmond	0
VCU	4
Butler	0
Kentucky	4
East Tennessee State	1
TCU	4
Duke	4
Winthrop	0
Clemson	4
Minnesota	0
California	4
San Diego	3
Montana State	0
USC	4
Tennessee	4
Wichita State	1
Arkansas	4
Oklahoma State	3
New Mexico	0
Washington	4
Pacific	0
Stanford	4
UCF	0
Florida	4
Arizona	4
Florida State	3
Georgia Tech	0
SMU	4
Baylor	4
Manhattan	0
LSU	4
Southern	0
Rice	4
South Alabama	2
North Carolina	4
South Carolina State	0
Ohio State	4
South Carolina	0
Mississippi State	4
Wake Forest	2
Virginia	4
American	0

Second round
Illinois	4
Arizona State	0
Tulane	2
Harvard	4
Georgia	4
Texas	2
Ole Miss	1
Vanderbilt	4
Pepperdine	0
UCLA	4
Texas A&M	4
VCU	0
Kentucky	2
TCU	4
Duke	3
Clemson	4
California	1
USC	4
Tennessee	1
Arkansas	4
Washington	2
Stanford	4
Florida	4
Arizona	0
SMU	0
Baylor	4
LSU	0
Rice	4
North Carolina	3
Ohio State	4
Mississippi State	2
Virginia	4

Third round
Illinois	4
Harvard	3
Georgia	3
Vanderbilt	4
UCLA	4
Texas A&M	1
TCU	2
Clemson	4
USC	4
Arkansas	1
Stanford	4
Florida	3
Baylor	4
Rice	1
Ohio State	4
Virginia	3

Quarterfinals
Illinois	4
Vanderbilt	0
UCLA	4
Clemson	0
USC	4
Stanford	0
Baylor	4
Ohio State	0

Semifinals
Illinois	2
UCLA	4
USC	0
Baylor	4

Championship
UCLA	0
Baylor	4

== See also ==
- 2004 NCAA Division I women's tennis championships
- 2004 NCAA Division II men's tennis championships
- 2004 NCAA Division III men's tennis championships
- 2004 NAIA men's tennis championships
