= 1999 NCAA Division I men's tennis championships =

1999 NCAA Division I Men's Tennis Championships
- Date: May 1999
- Edition: 53rd
- Location: Athens, Georgia
- Venue: Dan Magill Tennis Complex; University of Georgia

Champions

Men's singles
- (United States) Jeff Morrison (Florida)

Men's doubles
- (United States) K.J. Hippensteel / (United States) Ryan Wolters (Stanford)
← 1998 ·	NCAA Division I Men's Tennis Championships	· 2000 →

The 1999 NCAA Division I Men's Tennis Championships were the 53rd annual championships to determine the national champions of NCAA Division I men's singles, doubles, and team collegiate tennis in the United States.

Hosts Georgia defeated UCLA in the championship final, 4–2, to claim the Bulldogs' third team national title.

== Host sites ==
This year's tournaments were played at the Dan Magill Tennis Complex at the University of Georgia in Athens, Georgia.

The men's and women's tournaments would not be held at the same site until 2006.

== Bracket ==
=== Team ===
First round
UCLA	4
Western Michigan	0
San Diego State	4
Tulsa	1
Alabama	4
Hampton	1
Virginia Tech	4
VCU	3
Florida	4
Miami (FL)	0
NC State	2
South Florida	4
Fairleigh Dickinson	0
SMU	4
Kansas	2
TCU	4
Charleston Southern	2
Duke	4
Clemson	4
William & Mary	3
East Tennessee State	0
Kentucky	4
Indiana	2
South Carolina	4
LSU	4
Alcorn State	0
SW Louisiana	3
Tulane	4
UMKC	0
USC	4
Fresno State	4
UNLV	0
Sacramento State	0
Stanford	4
Boise State	1
Georgia Tech	4
Baylor	4
Indiana State	1
Harvard	4
Notre Dame	2
Marist	0
Texas	7
Texas A&M	4
Texas Tech	3
Georgia	4
Georgia State	2
Minnesota	1
Washington	4
Illinois	4
Northwestern	0
Michigan	3
Vanderbilt	4
Arizona State	4
Hofstra	0
New Mexico	0
Pepperdine	4
Ole Miss	4
Navy	1
South Alabama	4
Virginia	2
Tennessee	4
Tennessee Tech	0
Mississippi State	4
Purdue	3

Second round
UCLA	4
San Diego State	1
Alabama	3
Virginia Tech	4
Florida	4
South Florida	1
SMU	4
TCU	3
Duke	4
Clemson	0
Kentucky	4
South Carolina	0
LSU	4
Tulane	1
USC	1
Fresno State	4
Stanford	4
Georgia Tech	0
Baylor	4
Harvard	1
Texas	4
Texas A&M	1
Georgia	4
Washington	3
Illinois	4
Vanderbilt	2
Arizona State	4
Pepperdine	0
Ole Miss	4
Southern Alabama	0
Tennessee	3
Mississippi State	4

Third round
UCLA	4
Virginia Tech	1
Florida	4
SMU	1
Duke	4
Kentucky	2
LSU	4
Fresno State	2
Stanford	2
Baylor	4
Texas	0
Georgia	4
Illinois	4
Arizona State	1
Ole Miss	4
Mississippi State	2

Quarterfinals
UCLA	4
Florida	1
Duke	3
LSU	4
Baylor	3
Georgia	4
Illinois	3
Ole Miss	4

Semifinals
UCLA	4
LSU	1
Georgia	4
Ole Miss	1

Championship
UCLA	3
Georgia	4

== See also ==
- 1999 NCAA Division I women's tennis championships
- 1999 NCAA Division II men's tennis championships
- 1999 NCAA Division III men's tennis championships
- 1999 NAIA men's tennis championships
