= 2003 NCAA Division I men's tennis championships =

- Date: May 2003
- Edition: 57th
- Location: Athens, Georgia
- Venue: Dan Magill Tennis Complex; University of Georgia

Champions

Men's singles
- (Bosnia and Herzegovina) Amer Delic (Illinois)

Men's doubles
- (United States) Rajeev Ram / (United States) Brian Wilson (Illinois)

Men's team
- Illinois
← 2002 ·	NCAA Division I men's tennis championships	· 2004 →

The 2003 NCAA Division I men's tennis championships were the 57th annual championships hosted by the NCAA to determine the individual, doubles, and team national champions of men's collegiate tennis among its Division I member programs in the United States, held at the end of the 2002 NCAA Division I tennis season.

Illinois defeated Vanderbilt in the championship final, 4–3, to claim their first national title. This aided the Illini in winning the team, singles, and doubles NCAA tennis titles during the season.

== Host sites ==
This year's tournaments were played at the Dan Magill Tennis Complex at the University of Georgia in Athens, Georgia.

The men's and women's tournaments would not be held at the same site until 2006.

== Brackets ==
=== Team ===
First round
Butler	0
Illinois	4
Ball State	0
Clemson	4
American	0
Washington	4
San Diego	0
San Diego State	5
Duke	4
High Point	0
Brown	3
Wake Forest	4
College of Charleston	0
Ole Miss	4
Auburn	4
Georgia Tech	3
California	4
Sacramento State	0
Arizona	1
Boise State	4
Hampton	0
Kentucky	4
Arkansas	0
Ohio State	4
Oral Roberts	0
Stanford	4
Arizona State	2
Fresno State	4
Southern	0
Tulane	4
LSU	2
South Alabama	4
Baylor	4
Texas–Arlington	3
SMU	1
TCU	4
Alabama	4
Marist	0
Harvard	4
VCU	3
Tennessee Tech	1
Vanderbilt	4
Pepperdine	4
Mississippi State	1
Texas A&M	4
UMBC	0
Georgia	0
South Florida	4
Florida	4
UCF	0
Florida State	4
Miami (FL)	2
St. Bonaventure	0
Texas	5
Rice	4
South Carolina	2
UCLA	4
Wichita State	0
UC Santa Barbara	0
USC	4
Binghamton	0
Minnesota	4
North Carolina	0
Oklahoma State	4

Second round
Illinois	4
Clemson	0
Washington	4
San Diego State	3
Duke	4
Wake Forest	0
Ole Miss	4
Auburn	0
California	4
Boise State	1
Kentucky	3
Ohio State	4
Stanford	4
Fresno State	0
Tulane	4
South Alabama	0
Baylor	4
TCU	0
Alabama	4
Harvard	0
Vanderbilt	4
Pepperdine	2
Texas A&M	4
South Florida	1
Florida	4
Florida State	0
Texas	4
Rice	3
UCLA	4
USC	0
Minnesota	2
Oklahoma State	4

Third round
Illinois	4
Washington	2
Duke	2
Ole Miss	4
California	4
Ohio State	0
Stanford	4
Tulane	0
Baylor	4
Alabama	1
Vanderbilt	4
Texas A&M	1
Florida	4
Texas	3
UCLA	4
Oklahoma State	0

Quarterfinals
Illinois	4
Ole Miss	0
California	0
Stanford	4
Baylor	0
Vanderbilt	4
Florida	1
UCLA	4

Semifinals
Illinois	4
Stanford	2
Vanderbilt	4
UCLA	3

Championship
Illinois	4
Vanderbilt	3

== See also ==
- 2003 NCAA Division I women's tennis championships
- 2003 NCAA Division II men's tennis championships
- 2003 NCAA Division III men's tennis championships
- 2003 NAIA men's tennis championships
