= 1987 NCAA Division I men's tennis championships =

1987 NCAA Division I Men's Tennis Championships
- Date: June 1987
- Edition: 41st
- Location: Athens, Georgia
- Venue: Dan Magill Tennis Complex (University of Georgia)

Champions

Men's singles
- Andrew Burrow (Miami–FL)

Men's doubles
- Rick Leach / Scott Melville (USC)
← 1986 ·	NCAA Division I Men's Tennis Championships	· 1988 →

The 1987 NCAA Division I Men's Tennis Championships were the 41st annual championships to determine the national champions of NCAA Division I men's singles, doubles, and team collegiate tennis in the United States. This year's tournaments were played in Athens, Georgia, hosted by the University of Georgia.

The men's team championship was won by Georgia, their second team national title. The Bulldogs defeated UCLA in the final round, 5–1.

The men's singles title was won by South African Andrew Burrow from Miami (FL).

The men's doubles title was won by Rick Leach and Scott Melville from USC. This was Leach's second consecutive double's national title, having won the 1986 championship with Tim Pawsat.

== Host site ==
The tournaments were played at the Dan Magill Tennis Complex at the University of Georgia in Athens, Georgia. The men's and women's tournaments would not be held at the same venue until 2006.

== Format changes ==
- The men's team tournament field expanded from 16 to 20 teams, adding four First Round matches.

== Team championship ==
First round
Clemson	6
Kansas	1
Michigan	5
Kentucky	0
UC Irvine	6
Columbia	3
Miami (FL)	6
Utah	0

Second round
Georgia	5
Clemson	2
Pepperdine	5
California	3
USC	5
Michigan	1
LSU	5
Texas	2
Long Beach State	5
UC Irvine	3
Tennessee	5
South Carolina	3
SMU	1
Miami (FL)	5
UCLA	5
TCU	1

Quarterfinals
Georgia	5
Pepperdine	3
USC	5
LSU	3
Long Beach State	3
Tennessee	5
Miami (FL)	1
UCLA	5

Semifinals
Georgia	5
USC	4
Tennessee	2
UCLA	5

Championship
Georgia	5
UCLA	1

== See also ==
- 1987 NCAA Division I Tennis Championships
- NCAA Division II Tennis Championships (Men, Women)
- NCAA Division III Tennis Championships (Men, Women)
