= 1985 NCAA Division I men's tennis championships =

1985 NCAA Division I Men's Tennis Championships
- Date: June 1985
- Edition: 39th
- Location: Athens, Georgia
- Venue: Dan Magill Tennis Complex (University of Georgia)

Champions

Men's singles
- Mikael Pernfors (Georgia)

Men's doubles
- Kelly Jones / Carlos DiLaura (Pepperdine)
← 1984 ·	NCAA Division I Men's Tennis Championships	· 1986 →

The 1985 NCAA Division I Men's Tennis Championships were the 39th annual championships to determine the national champions of NCAA Division I men's singles, doubles, and team collegiate tennis in the United States. This year's tournaments were played in Athens, Georgia, hosted by the University of Georgia.

The men's team championship was won by hosts Georgia, their first team national title. The Bulldogs defeated defending national champion UCLA in the final round, 5–1.

The men's singles title was retained by Mikael Pernfors from Georgia. Pernfors became the first person to win back-to-back single's titles since Dennis Ralston in 1963 and 1964.

The men's doubles title was won by Kelly Jones and Carlos DiLaura from Pepperdine. It was also Jones' second consecutive double's title, the first player to do this since Mel Purcell and Rodney Harmon in 1980 and 1981.

== Host site ==
The tournaments were played at the Dan Magill Tennis Complex at the University of Georgia in Athens, Georgia. The men's and women's tournaments would not be held at the same venue until 2006.

== Team championship ==
First round
USC	5
Arkansas	3
Texas	6
Oklahoma State	2
Georgia	6
Harvard	2
Stanford	6
BYU	0
UCLA	5
Miami (FL)	2
Clemson	5
LSU	1
Pepperdine	5
Texas A&M	3
SMU	7
Michigan	0

Quarterfinals
USC	5
Texas	1
Georgia	5
Stanford	3
UCLA	5
Clemson	3
Pepperdine	2
SMU	5

Semifinals
USC	3
Georgia	5
UCLA	5
SMU	4

Championship
Georgia	5
UCLA	1
Third place
USC	5
SMU	4

== See also ==
- NCAA Division II Tennis Championships (Men, Women)
- NCAA Division III Tennis Championships (Men, Women)
