= 2002 NCAA Division I men's tennis championships =

- Date: May 2002
- Edition: 56th
- Location: College Station, Texas
- Venue: Mitchell Tennis Center; Texas A&M University

Champions

Men's singles
- (United States) Matias Boeker (Georgia)

Men's doubles
- (United States) Andrew Colombo / (Australia) Mark Kovacs (Auburn)

Men's team
- USC
← 2001 ·	NCAA Division I men's tennis championships	· 2003 →

The 2002 NCAA Division I men's tennis championships were the 56th annual championships hosted by the NCAA to determine the individual, doubles, and team national champions of men's collegiate tennis among its Division I member programs in the United States, held at the end of the 2002 NCAA Division I tennis season.

USC defeated defending champions Georgia in the championship final, 4–1, to claim the Trojans' sixteenth team national title.

== Host sites ==
This year's tournaments were played at the George P. Mitchell Tennis Center at Texas A&M University in College Station, Texas.

The men's and women's tournaments would not be held concurrently at the same site until 2006.

== Brackets ==
=== Team ===
First round
Georgia Tech	2
South Carolina	4
Charleston Southern	0
Georgia	4
LSU	4
TCU	0
Southern	0
Texas A&M	4
Arizona State	2
Minnesota	4
Pepperdine	4
Richmond	0
Alabama	3
Middle Tennessee	4
Brown	0
Ole Miss	4
UCLA	4
UC Santa Barbara	0
Hampton	0
San Diego State	5
Miami (FL)	1
South Florida	4
Florida	4
Georgia State	0
Tulane	2
Washington	4
Sacramento State	0
Stanford	4
Mississippi State	4
South Alabama	1
Auburn	4
ETSU	2
North Carolina	2
Virginia Tech	4
Tennessee	4
Wake Forest	0
SMU	2
VCU	5
Texas	4
UTSA	0
Ohio State	3
Vanderbilt	4
Kentucky	4
Murray State	0
California	4
UMBC	0
American	0
Duke	4
Indiana State	4
Northwestern	0
Butler	0
Illinois	4
Ball State	1
Purdue	4
Michigan	0
Notre Dame	4
Harvard	4
Marist	0
Baylor	4
Hartford	0
Arkansas	4
Tulsa	3
Oral Roberts	0
USC	5

Second round
South Carolina	0
Georgia	4
LSU	0
Texas A&M	4
Minnesota	0
Pepperdine	4
Middle Tennessee	1
Ole Miss	4
UCLA	4
San Diego State	1
South Florida	3
Florida	4
Washington	4
Stanford	3
Mississippi State	0
Auburn	4
Virginia Tech	0
Tennessee	4
VCU	1
Texas	4
Vanderbilt	3
Kentucky	4
California	3
Duke	4
Indiana State	0
Illinois	4
Purdue	0
Notre Dame	4
Harvard	0
Baylor	4
Arkansas	0
USC	4

Third round
Georgia	4
Texas A&M	1
Pepperdine	4
Ole Miss	3
UCLA	4
Florida	0
Washington	3
Auburn	4
Tennessee	4
Texas	0
Kentucky	4
Duke	1
Illinois	4
Notre Dame	1
Baylor	2
USC	4

Quarterfinals
Georgia	4
Pepperdine	1
UCLA	4
Auburn	0
Tennessee	4
Kentucky	1
Illinois	2
USC	4

Semifinals
Georgia	4
UCLA	2
Tennessee	3
USC	4

Championship
Georgia	1
USC	4

== See also ==
- 2002 NCAA Division I women's tennis championships
- 2002 NCAA Division II men's tennis championships
- 2002 NCAA Division III men's tennis championships
- 2002 NAIA men's tennis championships
