= 1979 NCAA Division I tennis championships =

1979 NCAA Division I Tennis Championships
- Date: May 1979
- Edition: 34th
- Location: Athens, Georgia, United States
- Venue: Dan Magill Tennis Complex (University of Georgia)

Champions

Men's singles
- Kevin Curren (Texas)

Men's doubles
- Erick Iskersky / Ben McKown (Trinity–TX)
- NCAA Division I Tennis Championships

The 1979 NCAA Division I Tennis Championships were the 34th annual tournaments to determine the national champions of NCAA men's college tennis. Matches were played during May 1979 at the Dan Magill Tennis Complex in Athens, Georgia on the campus of the University of Georgia. A total of three championships were contested: men's team, singles, and doubles.

The men's team championship was won by the UCLA Bruins, their 13th team national title. UCLA defeated Trinity (TX) in the final round, 5–3. The men's singles title was won by Kevin Curren from Texas, and the men's doubles title went to Erick Iskersky and Ben McKown of Trinity (TX).

== Team tournament ==
First round
UCLA	5
BYU	1
Pepperdine	5
Georgia	4
Stanford	7
Michigan	2
Princeton	5
Arkansas	4
Trinity (TX)	8
Wichita State	1
California	8
Tennessee	1
SMU	5
Clemson	0
USC	5
Texas	1

Quarterfinals
UCLA	5
Pepperdine	4
Stanford	7
Princeton	2
Trinity (TX)	6
California	3
SMU	7
USC	2

Semifinals
UCLA	6
Stanford	2
Trinity (TX)	5
SMU	4

Championship
UCLA	5
Trinity (TX)	3
Third place
Stanford	6
SMU	3

== See also ==
- NCAA Division I Women's Tennis Championship (from 1982)
- NCAA Men's Division II Tennis Championship
- NCAA Men's Division III Tennis Championship
