= 1988 NCAA Division I men's tennis championships =

1988 NCAA Division I Men's Tennis Championships
- Date: June 1988
- Edition: 42nd
- Location: Athens, Georgia
- Venue: Dan Magill Tennis Complex (University of Georgia)

Champions

Men's singles
- Robbie Weiss (Pepperdine)

Men's doubles
- Patrick Galbraith / Brian Garrow (UCLA)
← 1987 ·	NCAA Division I Men's Tennis Championships	· 1989 →

The 1988 NCAA Division I Men's Tennis Championships were the 42nd annual championships to determine the national champions of NCAA Division I men's singles, doubles, and team collegiate tennis in the United States.

Stanford defeated LSU, 5–2, in the final of the team championship, the Cardinal's ninth overall title.

== Host site ==
The tournaments were played at the Dan Magill Tennis Complex at the University of Georgia in Athens, Georgia. The men's and women's tournaments would not be held at the same venue until 2006.

== Brackets ==
=== Team championship ===
First round
BYU	1
Texas	5
Southwest Louisiana	5
West Virginia	2
California	5
Kansas	2
Tennessee	5
TCU	2

Second round
Stanford	5
Texas	0
Clemson	2
Kentucky	5
Arizona State	1
UC Irvine	5
USC	5
Southwest Louisiana	1
LSU	6
California	0
Georgia	5
UCLA	4
Georgia Tech	4
Michigan	5
Tennessee	1
Pepperdine	5

Quarterfinals
Stanford	5
Kentucky	2
UC Irvine	2
USC	5
LSU	5
Georgia	3
Michigan	5
Pepperdine	3

Semifinals
Stanford	5
USC	3
LSU	5
Michigan	4

Championship
Stanford	5
LSU	2

== See also ==
- NCAA Division II Tennis Championships (Men, Women)
- NCAA Division III Tennis Championships (Men, Women)
