= 1990 NCAA Division I men's tennis championships =

1990 NCAA Division I Men's Tennis Championships
- Date: June 1990
- Edition: 44th
- Location: Los Angeles, California
- Venue: David X. Marks Tennis Stadium; University of Southern California

Champions

Men's singles
- Steve Bryan (Texas)

Men's doubles
- Doug Eisenman / Matt Lucena (California)
← 1989 ·	NCAA Division I Men's Tennis Championships	· 1991 →

The 1990 NCAA Division I Tennis Championships were the 44th annual championships to determine the national champions of NCAA Division I men's singles, doubles, and team collegiate tennis in the United States.

For the third consecutive year, Stanford claimed the men's team national title, the Cardinal's eleventh overall.

== Host sites ==
The men's tournaments were played in Los Angeles, California, hosted by the University of Southern California. The men's and women's tournaments would not be held at the same site until 2006.

== Team championship ==
First round
UC Irvine	6
West Virginia	0
Harvard	3
San Diego	5
Alabama	2
Northwestern	5
Oklahoma State	5
Utah	3

Second round
Tennessee	5
UC Irvine	2
Arizona State	1
Miami (FL)	5
UCLA	5
San Diego	1
California	5
LSU	3
USC	5
South Carolina	2
Georgia	5
Northwestern	2
Texas	5
Pepperdine	3
Stanford	5
Oklahoma State	1

Quarterfinals
Tennessee	5
Miami (FL)	2
UCLA	5
California	3
USC	5
Georgia	1
Texas	1
Stanford	5

Semifinals
Tennessee	5
UCLA	4
USC	3
Stanford	5

Championship
Tennessee	2
Stanford	5

== See also ==
- 1990 NCAA Division I Women's Tennis Championships
- NCAA Division II Tennis Championships (Men, Women)
- NCAA Division III Tennis Championships (Men, Women)
- NAIA Men's Tennis Championship
