= 1953 NCAA tennis championships =

- Date: June 22–27, 1953
- Edition: 42nd
- Location: (New York (state)) Syracuse, NY, USA
- Venue: Drumlins Country Club (Syracuse University)

Champions

Men's singles
- (United States) Ham Richardson (Tulane)

Men's doubles
- (United States) Robert Perry / (United States) Lawrence Huebner (UCLA)

Men's team
- UCLA (3rd title)
← 1952 ·	NCAA tennis championships	· 1954 →

The 1953 NCAA tennis championships were the seventh annual tournaments hosted by the National Collegiate Athletic Association to determine the national champions of men's singles, doubles, and team collegiate tennis among its members in the United States, held at the end of the 1952 NCAA tennis season.

This year's tournaments were played in Syracuse, New York, hosted by Syracuse University, from June 22–27, 1953.

The tournament was directed by Syracuse athletic director Milton R. Howard, and the official referee was Perry Rockafellow, the tennis coach from Colgate.

A total of 72 teams entered in the singles tournament and 30 teams joined the doubles bracket, representing a total of 31 universities.

== Team scoring ==
- Scoring: Quarterfinals (1 point), Semifinals (2), Runners-up (3), Championship (4)

Rank	Team	Singles	Doubles	Total
1st place, gold medalist(s)	UCLA	5	6	11
2nd place, silver medalist(s)	California	2	4	6
3rd place, bronze medalist(s)	Tulane	4	1	5
4	USC	2	2	4
5	Washington	1	1	2
6	Texas	1	1	2

== Singles tournament ==
- 72 players, 31 universities

Quarterfinals
G Shea (USC)	11	6
F Hagist (CAL)	9	1
R Livingston (UCLA)	11	2	6
W Quillian (WASH)	9	6	3
H Richardson (TUL)	6	6
J Ricksen (CAL)	1	2
R Perry (UCLA)	6	6
J Hernandez (TEX)	1	3

Semifinals
G Shea (USC)	4	3	6	0
R Livingston (UCLA)	6	6	3	6
H Richardson (TUL)	6	6
R Perry (UCLA)	1	2

Finals
R Livingston (UCLA)	2	1	1
H Richardson (TUL)	6	6	6

== Doubles tournament ==
- 30 total teams, 31 universities

Quarterfinals
Perry / Huebner (UCLA)	8	8
Ricksen / Ricksen (CAL)	6	6
Shea / Grigry (USC)	4	8	6
Quillian / Flye (WASH)	6	6	3
Mayne / Ditzler (CAL)	6	6
Hernandez / Springer (TEX)	3	1
Livingston / Reed (UCLA)	3	6	9
Richardson / Wickersham (TUL)	6	1	7

Semifinals
Perry / Huebner (UCLA)	6	9	6
Shea / Grigry (USC)	1	7	3
Mayne / Ditzler (CAL)	4	14	6	6
Livingston / Reed (UCLA)	6	12	1	4

Finals
Perry / Huebner (UCLA)	2	7	4	7	6
Mayne / Ditzler (CAL)	6	5	6	5	4

== See also ==
- 1953 NAIA men's tennis championships
