= 1955 NCAA tennis championships =

1955 NCAA Tennis Championships
- Date: June 1955
- Edition: 10th
- Location: Chapel Hill, North Carolina
- Venue: University of North Carolina

Champions

Men's singles
- (Brazil) Jose Aguero (Tulane)

Men's doubles
- (Mexico) Francisco Contreras / (Mexico) Joaquín Reyes (USC)
← 1954 ·	NCAA Tennis Championships	· 1956 →

The 1955 NCAA Tennis Championships were the 10th annual NCAA-sponsored tournaments to determine the national champions of men's singles, doubles, and team collegiate tennis in the United States.

USC won the team championship, the Trojans' third such title. USC finished five points ahead of Texas (12–7) in the team standings.

== Host site ==
This year's tournaments were contested at the University of North Carolina in Chapel Hill, North Carolina.

== Team scoring ==
Until 1977, the men's team championship was determined by points awarded based on individual performances in the singles and doubles events.
