= 1956 NCAA tennis championships =

1956 NCAA Tennis Championships
- Date: June 1956
- Edition: 11th
- Location: Kalamazoo, Michigan
- Venue: Stowe Tennis Stadium; Kalamazoo College

Champions

Men's singles
- (United States) Alejandro Olmedo (USC)

Men's doubles
- (United States) Alejandro Olmedo / (Mexico) Francisco Contreras (USC)
← 1955 ·	NCAA Tennis Championships	· 1957 →

The 1956 NCAA Tennis Championships were the 11th annual NCAA-sponsored tournaments to determine the national champions of men's singles, doubles, and team collegiate tennis in the United States.

UCLA won the Team Championship, the Bruins' Fifth such title (and fourth in five years). UCLA finished just one point ahead of rivals (and defending champions) USC, 15–14, in the team standings.

== Host site ==
This year's tournaments were contested at Stowe Tennis Stadium at Kalamazoo College in Kalamazoo, Michigan.

== Team scoring ==
Until 1977, the men's team championship was determined by points awarded based on individual performances in the singles and doubles events.
