= Josh Goffi =

Brazilian tennis player

- Full name: Joshua Goffi
- Country (sports): Brazil
- Residence: South Carolina, United States
- Born: 24 January 1979 (age 46); São Paulo, Brazil
- Plays: Right-handed
- Prize money: $39,165

Singles
- Highest ranking: No. 488 (16 June 2003)

Doubles
- Career record: 2–2
- Career titles: 0
- Highest ranking: No. 121 (5 July 2004)

Joshua "Josh" Goffi (born 24 January 1979) is a former professional tennis player from Brazil.

== Biography ==
=== Early years ===
Goffi is the son of tennis coach Carlos Goffi, who coached the McEnroe brothers through his academy. He was born in São Paulo on 24 January 1979. When he was very young the family moved to South Carolina. His mother is an American.

In his younger days he favoured soccer as his sport and it was only at the age of 14 that he began to play tennis, at his own insistence rather than his father's, who was adamant not to pressure his son into the sport.

=== Tennis career ===
From 1998 to 2001 he attended Clemson University and was on three occasions named in the All-ACC first team. He made it into the top-10 of the collegiate rankings for both singles and doubles. After graduating with a finance degree in 2001, he competed professionally for four years, most successfully as a doubles player.

His biggest tournament win on the professional tour came when he partnered with Travis Parrott to win a Challenger event at Birmingham, Alabama in 2003. He also notably had a singles win over one-time doubles partner Stan Wawrinka in the qualifying rounds of the 2004 Turin Challenger.

At ATP Tour level he was a quarter-finalist with Ricardo Mello at the 2003 Brasil Open in São Paulo and appeared in the main draw of the Kitzbühel doubles in 2004.

Goffi represented his birth country during his career and in 2004 was called up to Brazil's Davis Cup team, which had been hit by a boycott from its top players. The tie, an Americas Zone match against Paraguay, took place in Bahia. Speaking only a little Portuguese, Goffi played in the doubles beside Alexandre Simoni, a match they won in four sets, versus Paulo Carvallo and Ramón Delgado.

=== Coaching ===
His coaching career started in 2006, at Arizona State University, where he worked as an assistant coach for two seasons. This was followed by two years at Duke University, also as an assistant coach.

Since 2011 he has been the head coach of the South Carolina Gamecocks men's tennis team.

=== Personal life ===
Goffi is married to the former professional soccer player Nancy Augustyniak Goffi, who he met while they were both at Clemson University. His sister in-law, Julie Augustyniak, also played soccer professionally.

== Challenger titles ==
=== Doubles ===
No.	Year	Tournament	Surface	Partner	Opponents	Score
1.	2003	Eddleman Pro Tennis Classic	Clay	(United States) Travis Parrott	(United States) Paul Goldstein (United States) Robert Kendrick	6–4, 2–6, 6–2

== See also ==
- List of Brazil Davis Cup team representatives
