= 1947 NCAA tennis championships =

- Date: May 1947
- Edition: 2nd
- Location: Los Angeles, California, United States

Champions

Men's singles
- Gardner Larned (William & Mary)

Men's doubles
- Sam Match / Bob Curtis (Rice)

Men's team
- William & Mary (1st title)
← 1946 ·	NCAA tennis championships	· 1948 →

The 1947 NCAA tennis championships were the second annual tournaments to determine the national champions of NCAA men's collegiate tennis. A total of three championships were contested: men's team, singles, and doubles.

Matches were played during May 1947 in Los Angeles, California.

The men's team championship was won by William & Mary, their first team national title. The Indians (10 points) finished six points ahead of Rice (4). The men's team championship was determined by total points earned in other events.

The men's singles title was won by Gardner Larned, from William & Mary, and the men's doubles title went to Sam Match and Bob Curtis, from Rice.
