= 1951 NCAA tennis championships =

- Date: June 1951
- Edition: 6th
- Location: Evanston, Illinois
- Venue: Vandy Christie Tennis Center; Northwestern University

Champions

Men's singles
- (United States) Tony Trabert (Cincinnati)

Men's doubles
- (United States) Earl Cochell / (United States) Hugh Stewart (USC)

Men's team
- USC (2nd title)
← 1950 ·	NCAA tennis championships	· 1952 →

The 1951 NCAA tennis championships were the sixth annual tournaments hosted by the National Collegiate Athletic Association to determine the national champions of men's singles, doubles, and team collegiate tennis among its members in the United States, held at the end of the 1951 NCAA tennis season.

USC won the team championship, the Trojans' second title. USC finished two points ahead of Cincinnati in the standings (9–7).

== Host site ==
This year's tournaments were contested at the Vandy Christie Tennis Center at Northwestern University in Evanston, Illinois.

== Team scoring ==
Until 1977, the men's team championship was determined by points awarded based on individual performances in the singles and doubles events.
