= 1946 NCAA tennis championships =

- Date: May 1946
- Edition: 1st
- Location: Evanston, Illinois, United States
- Venue: Northwestern University

Champions

Men's singles
- Bob Falkenburg USC

Men's doubles
- Bob and Tom Falkenburg (USC

Men's team
- USC (1st title)
NCAA tennis championships	· 1947 →

The 1946 NCAA Tennis Championships were the first annual tournaments to determine the national champions of NCAA men's collegiate tennis. A total of three championships were contested: men's team, singles, and doubles. The men's team championship was determined by total points earned in other events.

Matches were played during May 1946 in Evanston, Illinois on the campus of Northwestern University.

The men's team championship was won by USC, their 1st team national title. The Trojans (9 points) finished ahead of William & Mary (6).

The men's singles title was won by Bob Falkenburg, from USC, and the men's doubles title went to Bob and Tom Falkenburg, also from USC.
