= 1966 NCAA University Division tennis championships =

1966 NCAA University Division Tennis Championships
- Date: May 1966
- Edition: 21st
- Location: Miami, Florida
- Venue: University of Miami

Champions

Men's singles
- (United States) Charlie Pasarell (UCLA)

Men's doubles
- (New Zealand) Ian Crookenden / (United States) Charlie Pasarell (UCLA)
← 1965 ·	NCAA University Division Tennis Championships	· 1967 →

The 1966 NCAA University Division Tennis Championships were the 21st annual tournaments to determine the national champions of NCAA University Division men's singles, doubles, and team collegiate tennis in the United States.

USC captured the team championship, the Trojans' eighth such title. USC finished four points ahead of rivals, and defending champions, UCLA in the final team standings (27–23).

== Host site ==
This year's tournaments were contested at the University of Miami in Miami, Florida.

== Team scoring ==
Until 1977, the men's team championship was determined by points awarded based on individual performances in the singles and doubles events.
