= 1984 NCAA Division I men's tennis championships =

1984 NCAA Division I Men's Tennis Championships
- Date: June 1984
- Edition: 38th
- Location: Athens, Georgia
- Venue: Dan Magill Tennis Complex (University of Georgia)

Champions

Men's singles
- Mikael Pernfors (Georgia)

Men's doubles
- Kelly Jones / Jerome Jones (Pepperdine)
← 1983 ·	NCAA Division I Men's Tennis Championships	· 1985 →

The 1984 NCAA Division I Men's Tennis Championships were the 38th annual championships to determine the national champions of NCAA Division I men's singles, doubles, and team collegiate tennis in the United States. This year's tournaments were played in Athens, Georgia, hosted by the University of Georgia.

The men's team championship was won by UCLA, their 15th team national title. The Bruins defeated defending national champion Stanford in the final round, 5–4.

The men's singles title was won by Mikael Pernfors (a Swedish national) from Georgia, and the men's doubles title was won by Kelly Jones and Jerome Jones from Pepperdine.

== Host site ==
The tournaments were played at the Dan Magill Tennis Complex at the University of Georgia in Athens, Georgia. The men's and women's tournaments would not be held at the same venue until 2006.

== Team championship ==
First round
UCLA	6
LSU	0
Auburn	5
Texas	4
Pepperdine	7
Columbia	2
Trinity (TX)	6
Minnesota	2
SMU	5
Wichita State	1
Stanford	5
Clemson	4
Georgia	5
Arkansas	1
USC	7
Utah	0

Quarterfinals
UCLA	5
Auburn	2
Pepperdine	5
Trinity (TX)	4
SMU	4
Stanford	5
Georgia	5
USC	4

Semifinals
UCLA	5
Pepperdine	3
Stanford	5
Georgia	3

Championship
UCLA	5
Stanford	4
Third place
Pepperdine	5
Georgia	2

== See also ==
- 1984 NCAA Division I women's tennis championships
- NCAA Division II Tennis Championships (Men, Women)
- NCAA Division III Tennis Championships (Men, Women)
- NAIA tennis championships (men, women)
