= 1954 NCAA tennis championships =

1954 NCAA Tennis Championships
- Date: June 1954
- Edition: 9th
- Location: Seattle, Washington
- Venue: University of Washington

Champions

Men's singles
- (United States) Ham Richardson (Tulane)

Men's doubles
- (United States) Bob Perry / (United States) Ronald Livingston (UCLA)

Men's team
- UCLA (4th title)
← 1953 ·	NCAA Tennis Championships	· 1955 →

The 1954 NCAA Tennis Championships were the 9th annual tournaments to determine the national champions of NCAA men's singles, doubles, and team collegiate tennis in the United States.

Two-time defending champions UCLA won the team championship, the Bruins' fourth such title. UCLA finished five points ahead of rivals USC (15–10) in the team standings.

== Host site ==
This year's tournaments were contested at the University of Washington in Seattle, Washington.

== Team scoring ==
Until 1977, the men's team championship was determined by points awarded based on individual performances in the singles and doubles events.
