= 1952 NCAA tennis championships =

- Edition: 7th
- Location: Evanston, Illinois
- Venue: Vandy Christie Tennis Center; Northwestern University

Champions

Men's singles
- (United States) Hugh Stewart (USC)

Men's doubles
- (United States) Clifton Mayne / (United States) Hugh Ditzler (California)

Men's team
- UCLA (2nd title)
← 1951 ·	NCAA tennis championships	· 1953 →

The 1952 NCAA tennis championships were the seventh annual tournaments hosted by the U.S. National Collegiate Athletic Association to determine the national champions of men's singles, doubles, and team collegiate tennis among its members in the United States, held at the end of the 1952 NCAA tennis season.

UCLA won the team championship, the Bruins' second title. UCLA finished six points ahead of rivals USC and California (11–5) in the team standings.

== Host site ==
This year's tournaments were contested at the Vandy Christie Tennis Center at Northwestern University in Evanston, Illinois.

== Team scoring ==
Until 1977, the men's team championship was determined by points awarded based on individual performances in the singles and doubles events.

== See also ==
- 1952 NAIA men's tennis championships
