= 1965 NCAA University Division tennis championships =

1965 NCAA University Division Tennis Championships
- Date: May 1965
- Edition: 20th
- Location: Los Angeles, California
- Venue: University of California, Los Angeles

Champions

Men's singles
- (United States) Arthur Ashe (UCLA)

Men's doubles
- (New Zealand) Ian Crookenden / (United States) Arthur Ashe (UCLA)
← 1964 ·	NCAA University Division Tennis Championships	· 1966 →

The 1965 NCAA University Division Tennis Championships were the 20th annual tournaments to determine the national champions of NCAA University Division men's singles, doubles, and team collegiate tennis in the United States.

UCLA captured the team championship, the Bruins' eighth such title. UCLA finished eighteen points ahead of Miami (FL) in the final team standings (31–13).

== Host site ==
This year's tournaments were contested at the University of California, Los Angeles in Los Angeles, California.

== Team scoring ==
Until 1977, the men's team championship was determined by points awarded based on individual performances in the singles and doubles events.
