= 1998 NCAA Division I men's tennis championships =

1998 NCAA Division I Men's Tennis Championships
- Date: May 1998
- Edition: 52nd
- Location: Athens, Georgia
- Venue: Dan Magill Tennis Complex; University of Georgia

Champions

Men's singles
- (United States) Bob Bryan (Stanford)

Men's doubles
- (United States) Bob Bryan / (United States) Mike Bryan (Stanford)
← 1997 ·	NCAA Division I Men's Tennis Championships	· 1999 →

The 1998 NCAA Division I Men's Tennis Championships were the 52nd annual championships to determine the national champions of NCAA Division I men's singles, doubles, and team collegiate tennis in the United States.

Three-time defending champions Stanford again defeated Georgia in the championship final, 4–0, to claim the Cardinal's sixteenth team national title. With the team win, Stanford swept all three men's tennis titles (team, singles, and doubles).

== Host sites ==
The men's tournaments were played at the Dan Magill Tennis Complex at the University of Georgia in Athens, Georgia.

The men's and women's tournaments would not be held at the same site until 2006.

== Bracket ==
=== Team ===
==== National finals ====
- Asterisk notes a team that qualified via regional tournament.

First round
Stanford	4
*	Minnesota	0
Texas	2
*	UCLA	4
Illinois	1
*	Auburn	4
Mississippi State	4
*	South Carolina	0
Georgia	4
*	Harvard	0
USC	1
*	Pepperdine	4
Ole Miss	4
*	California	1
LSU	4
*	SMU	0

Quarterfinals
Stanford	5
UCLA	0
Auburn	0
Mississippi State	4
Georgia	4
Pepperdine	2
Ole Miss	0
LSU	4

Semifinals
Stanford	4
Mississippi State	0
Georgia	4
LSU	1

Championship
Stanford	4
Georgia	0

== See also ==
- 1998 NCAA Division I women's tennis championships
- NCAA Division II Tennis Championships (Men, Women)
- NCAA Division III Tennis Championships (Men, Women)
