= 2007 NCAA Division I tennis championships =

2007 NCAA Division I Tennis Championships
- Edition: 61st–Men; 25th–Women
- Location: Athens, Georgia
- Venue: Dan Magill Tennis Complex; University of Georgia

Champions

Men's singles
- (India) Somdev Devvarman (Virginia)

Women's singles
- (United States) Audra Cohen (Miami (FL))

Men's doubles
- (Germany) Marco Born / (Sweden) Andreas Siljeström (Middle Tennessee State)

Women's doubles
- (United States) Sara Anundsen / (United States) Jenna Long (North Carolina)
← 2006 ·	NCAA Division I Tennis Championships	· 2008 →

The 2007 NCAA Division I Tennis Championships were the 61st annual men's and 25th annual women's championships to determine the national champions of NCAA Division I men's and women's singles, doubles, and team collegiate tennis in the United States. The tournaments were played concurrently during May 2007 in Athens, Georgia.

Hosts Georgia defeated Illinois in the men's championship match, 4–0, to claim the Bulldogs' fifth team national title.

Meanwhile, Georgia Tech defeated UCLA in the women's title match, 4–2, to claim their first team national championship.

== Host sites ==
This year's tournaments were played at the Dan Magill Tennis Complex at the University of Georgia in Athens, Georgia.

== See also ==
- NCAA Division II Tennis Championships (Men, Women)
- NCAA Division III Tennis Championships (Men, Women)
