= 2008 NCAA Division I tennis championships =

2008 NCAA Division I Tennis Championships
- Edition: 62nd–Men; 26th–Women
- Location: Tulsa, Oklahoma
- Venue: Michael D. Case Tennis Center; University of Tulsa

Champions

Men's singles
- (India) Somdev Devvarman (Virginia)

Women's singles
- (United States) Amanda McDowell (Georgia Tech)

Men's doubles
- (Colombia) Robert Farah / (United States) Kaes Van't Hof (USC)

Women's doubles
- (United States) Tracy Lin / (Philippines) Riza Zalameda (UCLA)
← 2007 ·	NCAA Division I Tennis Championships	· 2009 →

The 2008 NCAA Division I Tennis Championships were the 62nd annual men's and 26th annual women's championships to determine the national champions of NCAA Division I men's and women's singles, doubles, and team collegiate tennis in the United States.

The tournaments were played concurrently during May 2008 in Tulsa, Oklahoma.

Defending team champions Georgia defeated Texas in the men's championship, 4–2, to claim the Bulldogs' sixth team national title.

UCLA defeated California in the women's championship, 4–0, to claim the Bruins' first team national title.

== Host sites ==
This year's tournaments were played at the Michael D. Case Tennis Center at the University of Tulsa in Tulsa, Oklahoma.

== See also ==
- NCAA Division II Tennis Championships (Men, Women)
- NCAA Division III Tennis Championships (Men, Women)
