= 2010 NCAA Division I tennis championships =

2010 NCAA Division I Tennis Championships
- Edition: 64th–Men; 28th–Women
- Location: Athens, Georgia
- Venue: Dan Magill Tennis Complex; University of Georgia

Champions

Men's singles
- (United States) Bradley Klahn (Stanford)

Women's singles
- (United States) Chelsey Gullickson (Georgia)

Men's doubles
- (United States) Drew Courtney / (United States) Michael Shabaz (Virginia)

Women's doubles
- (United States) Hilary Barte / (United States) Lindsay Burdette (Stanford)
← 2009 ·	NCAA Division I Tennis Championships	· 2011 →

The 2010 NCAA Division I Tennis Championships were the 64th annual men's and 28th annual women's championships to determine the national champions of NCAA Division I men's and women's singles, doubles, and team collegiate tennis in the United States. The tournaments were played concurrently during May 2010.

Defending champion USC defeated Tennessee in the men's championship, 4–2, to claim the Trojans' then-record eighteenth team national title.

Stanford defeated Florida in the women's championship, 4–3, to claim the Cardinal's then-record sixteenth team national title.

== Host site ==
This year's tournaments were played at the Dan Magill Tennis Complex at the University of Georgia in Athens, Georgia.

== See also ==
- NCAA Division II Tennis Championships (Men, Women)
- NCAA Division III Tennis Championships (Men, Women)
