= 1964 NCAA University Division tennis championships =

1964 NCAA University Division Tennis Championships
- Date: May 1964
- Edition: 19th
- Location: East Lansing, Michigan
- Venue: Michigan State University

Champions

Men's singles
- (United States) Dennis Ralston (USC)

Men's doubles
- (United States) William Bond / (United States) Dennis Ralston (USC)
← 1963 ·	NCAA University Division Tennis Championships	· 1965 →

The 1964 NCAA Tennis Championships were the 19th annual tournaments to determine the national champions of NCAA University Division men's singles, doubles, and team collegiate tennis in the United States.

Two-time defending champions USC captured the team championship, the Trojans' seventh such title. USC finished one point ahead of rivals UCLA in the final team standings (26–25).

== Host site ==
This year's tournaments were contested at Michigan State University in East Lansing, Michigan.

== Team scoring ==
Until 1977, the men's team championship was determined by points awarded based on individual performances in the singles and doubles events.
