= 1997 NCAA Division I men's tennis championships =

1997 NCAA Division I Men's Tennis Championships
- Date: May 1997
- Edition: 51st
- Location: Los Angeles, California
- Venue: Los Angeles Tennis Center; University of California, Los Angeles

Champions

Men's singles
- (Australia) Luke Smith (UNLV)

Men's doubles
- (Australia) Luke Smith / (Australia) Tim Blenkiron (UNLV)
← 1996 ·	NCAA Division I Men's Tennis Championships	· 1998 →

The 1997 NCAA Division I Tennis Championships were the 51st annual championships to determine the national champions of NCAA Division I men's singles, doubles, and team collegiate tennis in the United States.

Two-time defending champions Stanford defeated Georgia in the championship final, 4–0, to claim the Cardinal's third consecutive and fifteenth overall team national title.

== Host sites ==
The men's tournaments were played at the Los Angeles Tennis Center at the University of California, Los Angeles in Los Angeles, California.

The men's and women's tournaments would not be held at the same site until 2006.

== Bracket ==
=== Team ===
==== National finals ====
- Asterisk notes a team that qualified via regional tournament.

First round
UCLA	4
*	Northwestern	0
LSU	1
*	Duke	4
Mississippi State	4
*	Florida	1
Georgia	4
*	Fresno State	0
Stanford	4
*	Harvard	0
Kentucky	1
*	Texas	4
Boise State	4
*	Auburn	1
Ole Miss	4
*	UC Santa Barbara	0

Quarterfinals
UCLA	4
Duke	2
Mississippi State	2
Georgia	4
Stanford	4
Texas	0
Boise State	3
Ole Miss	4

Semifinals
UCLA	2
Georgia	4
Stanford	4
Ole Miss	2

Championship
Georgia	0
Stanford	4

== See also ==
- 1997 NCAA Division I women's tennis championships
- NCAA Division II Tennis Championships (Men, Women)
- NCAA Division III Tennis Championships (Men, Women)
