= 2011 NCAA Division I tennis championships =

2011 NCAA Division I Tennis Championships
- Edition: 65th–Men; 29th–Women
- Location: Stanford, California
- Venue: Taube Tennis Center; Stanford University

Champions

Men's singles
- (United States) Steve Johnson (USC)

Women's singles
- (Slovakia) Jana Juricová (California)

Men's doubles
- (United States) Jeff Dadamo / (United States) Austin Krajicek (Texas A&M)

Women's doubles
- (United States) Hilary Barte / (United States) Mallory Burdette (Stanford)
- NCAA Division I Tennis Championships

The 2011 NCAA Division I Tennis Championships were the 65th annual men's and 29th annual women's championships to determine the national champions of NCAA Division I men's and women's singles, doubles, and team collegiate tennis in the United States. The tournaments were played concurrently during May 2011.

Three-time champion USC defeated Virginia in the men's championship, 4–3, to claim the Trojans' then-record nineteenth team national title.

Florida defeated defending champions Stanford in the women's championship, 4–3, to claim the Gators' fifth team national title.

== Host site ==
This year's tournaments were played at the Taube Tennis Center at Stanford University in Stanford, California.

== See also ==
- NCAA Division II Tennis Championships (Men, Women)
- NCAA Division III Tennis Championships (Men, Women)
