= 2009 NCAA Division I tennis championships =

2009 NCAA Division I Tennis Championships
- Edition: 63rd–Men; 27th–Women
- Location: College Station, Texas
- Venue: Mitchell Tennis Center; Texas A&M University

Champions

Men's singles
- (United States) Devin Britton (Ole Miss)

Women's singles
- (United States) Mallory Cecil (Duke)

Men's doubles
- (United Kingdom) Dominic Inglot / (United States) Michael Shabaz (Virginia)

Women's doubles
- (Sweden) Mari Andersson / (Slovakia) Jana Juricová (California)
← 2008 ·	NCAA Division I Tennis Championships	· 2010 →

The 2009 NCAA Division I Tennis Championships were the 63rd annual men's and 27th annual women's championships to determine the national champions of NCAA Division I men's and women's singles, doubles, and team collegiate tennis in the United States. The tournaments were played concurrently during May 2009.

USC defeated Ohio State in the men's championship, 4–1, to claim the Trojans' seventeenth team national title.

Duke defeated California in the women's championship, 4–0, to claim the Blue Devils' first team national title.

== Host sites ==
This year's tournaments were played at the Mitchell Tennis Center at Texas A&M University in College Station, Texas.

== See also ==
- NCAA Division II Tennis Championships (Men, Women)
- NCAA Division III Tennis Championships (Men, Women)
