= 2014 NCAA Division I tennis championships =

2014 NCAA Division I Tennis Championships
- Date: May 16–May 21, 2014
- Edition: 69th (men), 33rd (women)
- Location: Athens, Georgia, United States
- Venue: (United States) Dan Magill Tennis Complex (University of Georgia)

Champions

Men's singles
- (United States) Marcos Giron, UCLA

Women's singles
- (United States) Danielle Collins, Virginia

Men's doubles
- (Latvia) Miķelis Lībietis & (United States) Hunter Reese, Tennessee

Women's doubles
- (Canada) Erin Routliffe & (United States) Maya Jansen, Alabama
- NCAA Division I Tennis Championships

The 2014 NCAA Division I Tennis Championships were the men's and women's tennis tournaments played concurrently from May 16 to May 21, 2014, in Athens, Georgia on the campus of the University of Georgia. It was the 69th edition of the NCAA Division I Men's Tennis Championship and the 33rd edition of the NCAA Division I Women's Tennis Championship. It was the ninth time the men's and women's tournaments were held at the same venue. It consisted of a men's and women's team, singles, and doubles championships.

== Women's championship ==
The UCLA Bruins defeated North Carolina 4–3 to win their second national title. The team was coached by Stella Sampras, the sister of Pete Sampras. Their last championship was won in 2008. Danielle Collins from the University of Virginia won the singles title, and the team of Maya Jansen and Erin Routliffe from the University of Alabama won the doubles title.
