= South Carolina Gamecocks men's tennis =

South Carolina Gamecocks
- University: University of South Carolina
- Head coach: Josh Goffi (16th season)
- Conference: SEC; East Division
- Location: Columbia, South Carolina, US
- Home Court: Carolina Tennis Center; USC Indoor Fieldhouse
- Nickname: Gamecocks
- Colors: Garnet and black

NCAA Tournament Semifinals
- 1989

NCAA Tournament Quarterfinals
- 1989, 2023

NCAA Tournament Round of 16
- 1978, 1987, 1989, 1990, 1991, 1998, 2005, 2021, 2022, 2023, 2024, 2025, 2026

NCAA Tournament Round of 32
- 1991, 1997, 1998, 1999, 2000, 2002, 2005, 2014, 2017, 2018, 2019, 2021, 2022, 2023, 2025, 2026

NCAA Tournament appearances
- 1978, 1987, 1989, 1990, 1991, 1994, 1995, 1996, 1997, 1998, 1999, 2000, 2001, 2002, 2003, 2004, 2005, 2006, 2009, 2012, 2013, 2014, 2017, 2018, 2019, 2021, 2022, 2023, 2024, 2025, 2026

Conference Tournament championships
- Atlantic Coast Conference: 1968; Metro Conference: 1985, 1986, 1987, 1989, 1990, 1991

Conference regular season champions
- Atlantic Coast Conference: 1968

The South Carolina Gamecocks men's tennis team represents the University of South Carolina and competes in the Southeastern Conference. The team has been coached by Josh Goffi since 2011.

== Head coaches ==
Name	Years	Seasons	Won	Lost	Tie	Pct.
Joe Grugin	1956	1	3	8	0	.273
Walter Hambrick	1957–1960	4	23	32	0	.418
Bob Brown	1961	1	7	8	0	.467
Marshall Reed	1962	1	0	8	0	.000
W.L. Strickland	1963	1	0	9	0	.000
Bill McClain	1964–1969	6	72	36	2	.673
Bobby Heald	1970	1	5	14	0	.263
Ron Moser	1971	1	9	11	0	.450
Ron Smarr	1972–1984	13	320	77	0	.806
Kent DeMars	1985–2010	26	390	291	0	.573
Josh Goffi	2011–Present	16	267	169	0	.612
All-Time		70	1098	663	2	.623

== Year-by-Year Results ==
Season	Coach	Record		Conference Standing	Conference Tournament	Postseason
Season	Coach	Overall	Conference	Conference Standing	Conference Tournament	Postseason
Atlantic Coast Conference
1956	Joe Grugin	3-8	1-6	8th	—	—
1957	Walter Hambrick	7-10	1-7	8th	—	—
1958	Walter Hambrick	5-9	1-5	7th	—	—
1959	Walter Hambrick	4-8	0-7	8th	—	—
1960	Walter Hambrick	7-5	1-5	7th	—	—
1961	Bob Brown	7-8	2-5	7th	—	—
1962	Marshall Reed	0-8	0-7	8th	—	—
1963	W.L. Strickland	0-9	0-7	8th	—	—
1964	Bill McClain	0-10-1	0-6-1	8th	—	—
1965	Bill McClain	3-14	0-7	8th	—	—
1966	Bill McClain	12-5	3-4	T-5th	—	—
1967	Bill McClain	16-4	4-3	T-3rd	—	—
1968	Bill McClain	22-0-1	7-0	1st	Champions	—
1969	Bill McClain	17-3	4-3	4th	—	—
1970	Bobby Heald	5-14	2-5	6th	—	—
1971	Ron Smarr	9-11	1-4	T-6th	—	—
Independent
1972	Ron Smarr	22-4	—	—	—	—
1973	Ron Smarr	26-3	—	—	—	—
1974	Ron Smarr	25-9	—	—	—	—
1975	Ron Smarr	24-3	—	—	—	—
1976	Ron Smarr	31-2	—	—	—	—
1977	Ron Smarr	20-8	—	—	—	—
1978	Ron Smarr	25-6	—	—	—	NCAA Round of 16
1979	Ron Smarr	28-13	—	—	—	—
1980	Ron Smarr	21-9	—	—	—	—
1981	Ron Smarr	27-5	—	—	—	—
1982	Ron Smarr	22-7	—	—	—	—
1983	Ron Smarr	21-8	—	—	—	—
Metro Conference
1984	Ron Smarr	24-8	—	—	Finals	—
1985	Kent DeMars	24-5	—	—	Champions	—
1986	Kent DeMars	16-9	—	—	Champions	—
1987	Kent DeMars	19-10	—	—	Champions	NCAA Round of 16
1988	Kent DeMars	5-18	—	—	Semifinals	—
1989	Kent DeMars	21-8	—	—	Champions	NCAA Semifinals
1990	Kent DeMars	17-9	—	—	Champions	NCAA Round of 16
1991	Kent DeMars	17-9	—	—	Champions	NCAA Round of 16
Southeastern Conference
1992	Kent DeMars	8-14	3-8	T-8th	First Round	—
1993	Kent DeMars	11-11	3-8	T-8th	First Round	—
1994	Kent DeMars	19-8	5-6	T-6th	First Round	NCAA First Round
1995	Kent DeMars	12-16	1-10	11th	First Round	NCAA First Round
1996	Kent DeMars	13-11	3-8	10th	First Round	NCAA First Round
1997	Kent DeMars	17-10	4-7	T-8th	First Round	NCAA Round of 32
1998	Kent DeMars	21-8	5-6	T-6th	Quarterfinals	NCAA Round of 16
1999	Kent DeMars	18-12	5-6	4th	Semifinals	NCAA Round of 32
2000	Kent DeMars	10-13	3-8	9th	First Round	NCAA Round of 32
2001	Kent DeMars	13-13	3-8	10th	Quarterfinals	NCAA First Round
2002	Kent DeMars	17-9	4-7	5th (East)	Quarterfinals	NCAA Round of 32
2003	Kent DeMars	17-8	5-6	4th (East)	First Round	NCAA First Round
2004	Kent DeMars	15-14	3-8	6th (East)	Quarterfinals	NCAA First Round
2005	Kent DeMars	20-10	6-5	T-3rd (East)	Quarterfinals	NCAA Round of 16
2006	Kent DeMars	14-15	5-6	4th (East)	Quarterfinals	NCAA First Round
2007	Kent DeMars	11-14	2-9	6th (East)	First Round	—
2008	Kent DeMars	11-13	1-10	6th (East)	Quarterfinals	—
2009	Kent DeMars	15-11	3-8	5th (East)	First Round	NCAA First Round
2010	Kent DeMars	9-13	1-10	6th (East)	First Round	—
2011	Josh Goffi	6-18	1-10	6th (East)	First Round	—
2012	Josh Goffi	15-12	2-9	T-5th (East)	First Round	NCAA First Round
2013	Josh Goffi	18-11	7-5	T-3rd (East)	Quarterfinals	NCAA First Round
2014	Josh Goffi	16-14	5-7	T-7th	Quarterfinals	NCAA Round of 32
2015	Josh Goffi	15-15	3-9	T-9th	Second Round	—
2016	Josh Goffi	14-15	4-8	11th	Quarterfinals	—
2017	Josh Goffi	21-7	9-3	T-3rd	Quarterfinals	NCAA Second Round
2018	Josh Goffi	20-8	7-5	T-5th	First Round	NCAA Second Round
2019	Josh Goffi	18-10	5-7	T-6th	Semifinals	NCAA Second Round
2020	Josh Goffi	9-5	2-2	—	—	Tournament canceled due to COVID-19
2021	Josh Goffi	17-10	7-5	T-4th	Semifinals	NCAA Round of 16
2022	Josh Goffi	23-7	10-2	T-2nd	Quarterfinals	NCAA Round of 16
2023	Josh Goffi	22-7	10-2	4th	Quarterfinals	NCAA Round Quarterfinals
2024	Josh Goffi	19-15	4-8	11th	Finals	NCAA Round of 16
2025	Josh Goffi	21-8	11-3	3rd	Finals	NCAA Round of 16
2026	Josh Goffi	18-9	8-6	5th	Quarterfinals	NCAA Round of 16
Total	South Carolina	1100-664-2	160-235		6 Metro Championships	33 NCAA Men's Tennis Championship appearance
