= Georgia Bulldogs men's tennis =

University of Georgia team

- Athletic director: Josh Brooks
- Head coach: Jamie Hunt (1st season)
- Conference: SEC
- Location: Athens, Georgia, US
- Nickname: Georgia Bulldogs
- Colors: Red and black

NCAA Tournament championships
- 1985, 1987, 1999, 2001, 2007, 2008

Conference Tournament championships
- 1991, 1993, 1995, 2001, 2004, 2006, 2007, 2012, 2013, 2017

Conference regular season champions
- 1971, 1972, 1973, 1974, 1975, 1977, 1978, 1979, 1981, 1982, 1985, 1987, 1988, 1989, 1991, 1993, 1995, 1996, 1997, 1999, 2001, 2002, 2006, 2007, 2008, 2011, 2013, 2014, 2015, 2016, 2017, 2023

The Georgia Bulldogs men's tennis team represents the University of Georgia in NCAA Division I college tennis. The team is part of the Southeastern Conference and plays home matches at the Dan Magill Tennis Complex. As of the end of the 2025 season, Georgia has won five NCAA singles championships, three NCAA doubles championship, ten SEC regular season titles, 32 SEC tournament titles, two ITA indoor team titles, and six national team championships.

== Head coaches ==
Head coaches of the Bulldogs.

| No. | Name | Seasons | Total Seasons | SEC Champs | SEC Tourney Champs | National Champs | Record | Pct. |
|---|---|---|---|---|---|---|---|---|
| 1 | Dan Magill | 1955-1988 | 34 | 13 | - | 2 | 706-183 | .794 |
| 2 | Manuel Diaz | 1989-2024 | 36 | 19 | 10 | 4 | 781-196 | .799 |
| 3 | Jamie Hunt | 2025 - Present | 1 | - | - | - | 16-12 | .571 |

== See also ==
- Category:Georgia Bulldogs men's tennis players (42)
- Category:Georgia Bulldogs men's tennis coaches (2)
