= Illinois Fighting Illini =

Athletics teams of the University of Illinois Urbana-Champaign

- University: University of Illinois Urbana-Champaign
- Nickname: Fighting Illini
- NCAA: Division I (FBS)
- Conference: Big Ten
- Athletic director: Josh Whitman
- Location: Champaign-Urbana, Illinois
- Varsity teams: 21 (10 men's, 11 women's)
- Football stadium: Memorial Stadium
- Basketball arena: State Farm Center
- Baseball stadium: Illinois Field
- Softball stadium: Eichelberger Field
- Soccer stadium: Demirjian Park
- Other venues: ARC Pool; Atkins Tennis Center; Huff Hall; Atkins Golf Club at the University of Illinois; UI Arboretum; UI Armory
- Colors: Orange and blue
- Fight song: Illinois Loyalty, Oskee Wow-Wow
- Website: fightingillini.com

Team NCAA championships
- 18

Individual and relay NCAA champions
- 167

The Illinois Fighting Illini (/ɪˈlaɪnaɪ/) are the intercollegiate athletic teams that represent the University of Illinois Urbana-Champaign. The university offers 10 men's and 11 women's varsity sports.

The university operates a number of athletic facilities, including Memorial Stadium for football, the State Farm Center for both men's and women's basketball, Illinois Field for baseball, the ARC Pool for women's swimming and diving, the Atkins Tennis Center for men's and women's tennis, Eichelberger Field for softball, Huff Hall for men's and women's gymnastics, women's volleyball and men's wrestling, Demirjian Park for women's soccer and for men's and women's outdoor track and field, the Atkins Golf Club at the University of Illinois for men's and women's golf, the University of Illinois Arboretum for cross country and the University of Illinois Armory for men's and women's indoor track and field.

The Fighting Illini lay claim to over 25 National Championships dating back to 1900.

== Etymology ==
The University of Illinois official team name is the Fighting Illini. The Illiniwek, Illinois Confederation, or Illini, were made up of 12 or 13 tribes who lived in the Mississippi River Valley. The term "Illini", in relation to campus activities, appears to be first mentioned in January 1874, when the weekly newspaper changed its name from The Student to The Illini. An editorial in the first edition of the renamed newspaper indicated that Illini was a new term. During the late 19th century and beginning of the 20th century, it was used to refer to the students, faculty, staff, and alumni of the university, as well as to the campus as a whole. Many NCAA and High School mascots bearing reference to first nation people have changed their names. However, the University of Illinois maintains its position that the Illini nickname does not refer to the first nation inhabitants of the same land.

The term Illini referring to the university's athletic teams seems to come from secondhand accounts of the athletic teams. The earliest reference in the Illio yearbook appears to be one mention in the summary of the 1907 football season. The term was more widely used in the 1910s especially during the 1914, 1915, and 1916 football seasons. The Daily Illini and football programs prior to these dates do not extensively cite the term and also used the terms "Indians", "our men", "Orange and Blue", and the "homecomers".

The Illinois Confederation, also referred to as the Illiniwek or Illini, lived in the Mississippi River Valley and expanded their tribes in an area that stretched from Lake Michigan to Iowa, Illinois, Missouri, and Arkansas.

The term Fighting Illini first appeared in a January 29, 1911, newspaper article describing the basketball team's effort during a game versus Purdue. By March 3, 1911, the athletic teams appeared to have earned the Fighting Illini nickname as a formal appellation evidenced in a newspaper report. In 2005, evidence suggested Fighting Illini was first used in 1921 as part of a fundraising campaign for construction of Memorial Stadium, but articles discovered in 2013 show it was first used in 1911. The Fighting Illini nickname was adopted by general consensus as an unofficial school nickname sometime between 1921 and 1930. It was then used in newspaper articles, football programs and other publications eventually becoming the official name.

== Sports sponsored ==
Big Ten logo in Illinois's colors

Men's sports	Women's sports
Baseball	Basketball
Basketball	Cross country
Cross country	Golf
Football	Gymnastics
Golf	Soccer
Gymnastics	Softball
Tennis	Swimming and diving
Track and field^{1}	Tennis
Wrestling	Track and field^{1}
	Volleyball
^{1} – includes both indoor and outdoor

Illinois has won 18 overall men's and women's NCAA team national championships through the 2017 NCAA athletic season. Illinois ranks thirty-sixth all-time in total NCAA Division I national championships through the 2020–21 NCAA athletic season.

=== Baseball ===
Fighting Illini baseball has 10 NCAA Tournament appearances, 33 Big Ten championships and 4 Big Ten Tournament championships in 1989, 1990, 2000 and 2011.

=== Basketball ===
==== Men's basketball ====
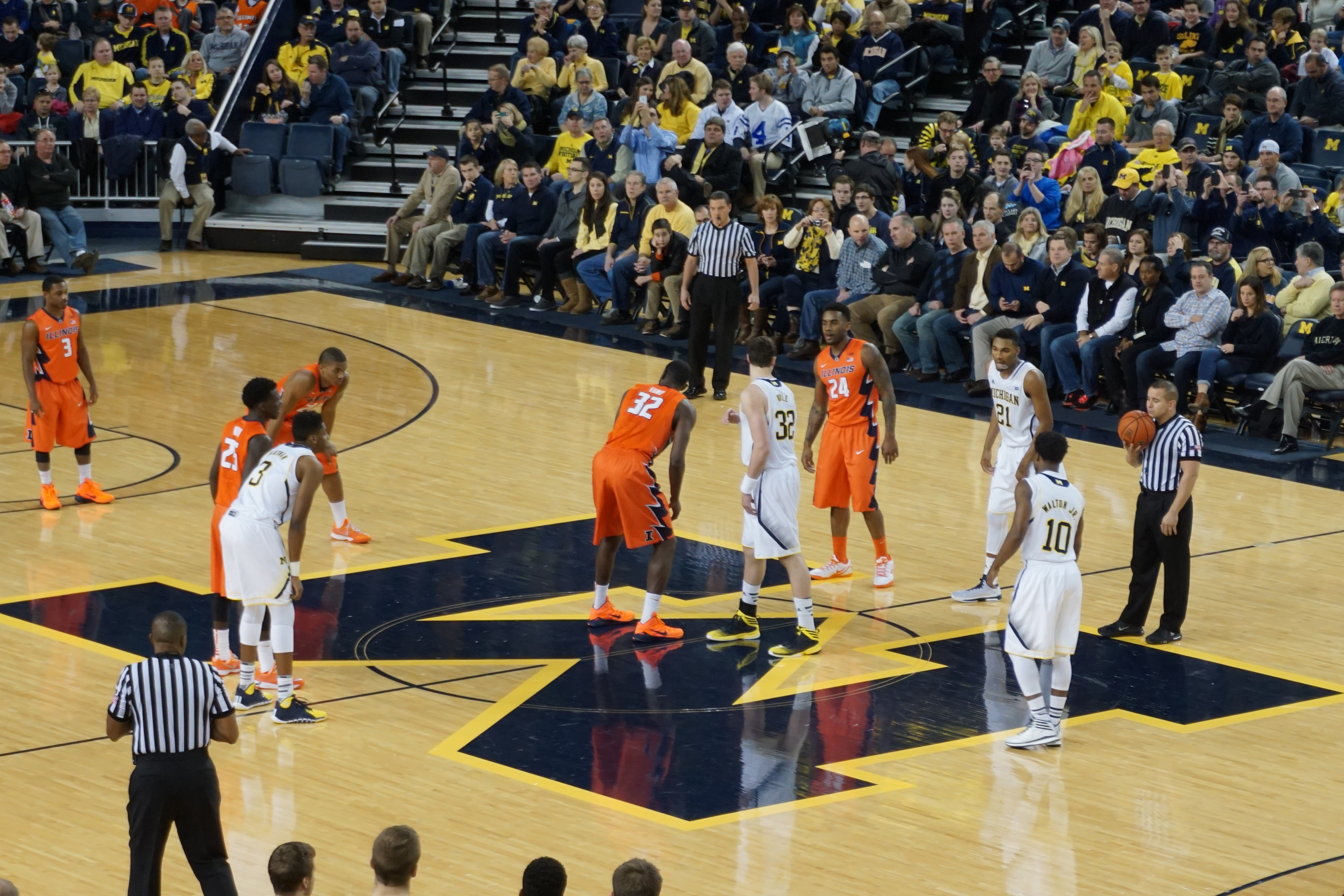
Illinois v Michigan game in 2014

Fighting Illini men's basketball titles include the 1915 Helms national championship, six NCAA Final Four appearances in 1949, 1951, 1952, 1989, 2005, 2026, 17 Big Ten championships, and four Big Ten Tournament championships in 2003, 2005, 2021, and 2024. Through the end of the 2023–24 season, Illinois ranks 13th all-time in winning percentage and 13th all-time in wins among all NCAA Division I men's college basketball programs.

==== Women's basketball ====
Fighting Illini women's basketball began play in 1974. The team won the 1997 Big Ten championship. They have made 8 NCAA Tournament appearances, including 2 Sweet Sixteen appearances in 1997 and 1998.

=== Cross country ===
==== Men's cross country ====
The men's cross country team were the Big Ten Champions in 1921, 1947 and 1984.

==== Women's cross country ====
The Fighting Illini women's cross country team began play in 1977. Illinois won an individual NCAA championship in 2009.

=== Football ===
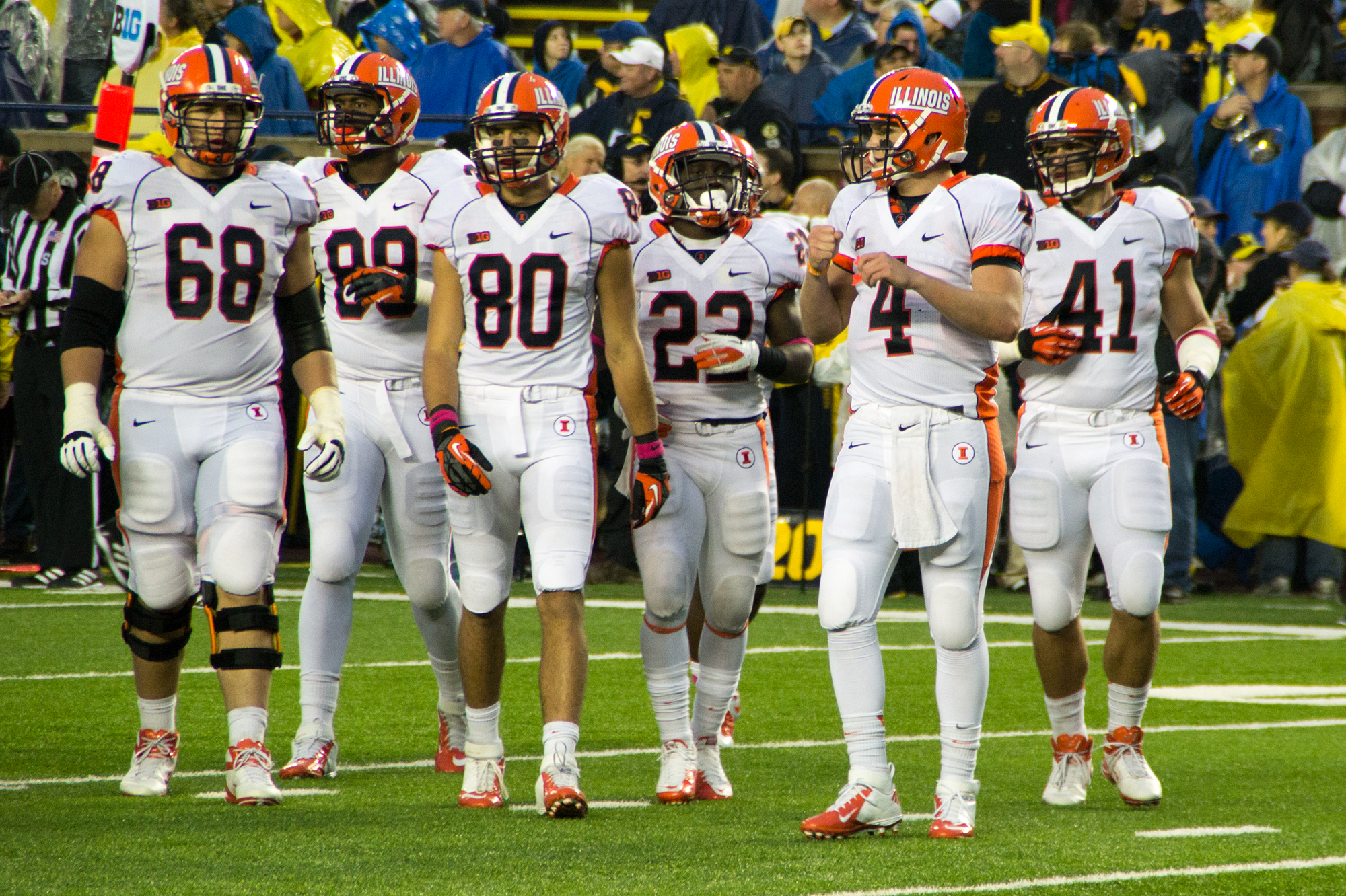
Illinois players during a game v Michigan in 2012

The University of Illinois has been selected for national championship titles for their accomplishments in five seasons (1914, 1919, 1923, 1927, 1951) by NCAA-designated major selectors, often using mathematical algorithms. Illinois claims championships for all five years.

The Fighting Illini program recognizes the 1951 co-national title selection by William F. Boand, but as recently as 2006 this was not mentioned officially by the school. The team also has 15 Big Ten Championship Football victories with 8 Bowl Game Victories at the 1947 Rose Bowl, 1952 Rose Bowl, 1964 Rose Bowl, 1990 Florida Citrus Bowl, 1994 Liberty Bowl, 1999 MicronPC.com Bowl, 2010 Texas Bowl, 2011 Kraft Fight Hunger Bowl, and 2024 Citrus Bowl

=== Golf ===
==== Men's golf ====
The men's golf team play their home matches on the Atkins Golf Club at the University of Illinois five miles from the university's campus, and are currently led by head coach Mike Small. The Fighting Illini men's golf program has won 18 Big Ten championships and in 2013 finished as national runner-up at the NCAA Division I Men's Golf Championships, which was the highest finish in the program's history. 2014 was the third time in the past four years the program had qualified for the match play portion of the NCAA Men's Golf Championships in which the final eight teams compete in a bracket format.

==== Women's golf ====
The Fighting Illini women's golf team began play in 1975. The team has made four NCAA Tournament appearances in 2002, 2003, 2011 and 2012.

=== Gymnastics ===
==== Men's gymnastics ====
The men's gymnastics team have been invited to 44 NCAA tournaments and have won 10 team NCAA championships, which is second most all-time only to Penn State Nittany Lions 12 team titles. Additionally, the Fighting Illini have won an all-time record 53 individual NCAA titles. The Illini hold their competitions at George Huff Hall on the Champaign side of campus, and the team trains and holds practices at the Kenney Gym on the Urbana side of campus.

==== Women's gymnastics ====
The Fighting Illini women's gymnastics team began play in 1974. The team won three Big Ten Championships in 1990, 1991 and 1992.

=== Soccer ===
The Fighting Illini women's soccer team began play in 1997. The team won two Big Ten Championships in 2003 and 2011. They have made thirteen NCAA Tournaments appearances in 2000, 2001, 2003, 2004, 2005, 2006, 2007, 2008, 2010, 2011, 2012, 2013, and 2025. The team has four sweet sixteen appearances in 2004, 2006, 2008, 2013 and one elite eight appearance in 2004. The Illini are currently led by Katie Hultin, who has been the head coach since 2025.

=== Softball ===
The Fighting Illini softball team began play in 2000. The team has made eight NCAA Tournament appearances in 2003, 2004, 2009, 2010, 2016, 2017, 2019, and 2022. The current head coach is Tyra Perry.

=== Swimming and diving ===
The Fighting Illini women's swimming and diving team began play in 1974. The team had individual NCAA champions in 1983, 1984, 1985, 1988, 1989, 1990, 1991, 1992, 1995, 1997, 1998, 1999, 2000, 2001, 2002, 2003, 2004, 2005, 2006 and 2007.

=== Tennis ===
==== Men's tennis ====
The Illinois men's tennis program was founded in 1908, but has enjoyed most of its success in recent years. The Illini have been one of the most successful men's tennis programs in the nation over the past twenty seasons, winning nine consecutive Big Ten Championships from 1997 to 2005; six of seven Big Ten Tournament Championships between 1999 and 2005; appearing in the NCAA Sweet Sixteen fourteen times, including eight years in a row (2002–09); advancing to three NCAA Final Fours between 2003 and 2007; and winning the 2003 NCAA National Championship. They have also won two ITA National Team Indoor Championships (2003, 2004) and lost in the championship match three other times (1998, 1999, 2002). Illinois men's tennis owns the record for longest consecutive win streak in NCAA history at 64 matches, spanning from their first match of the 2002–03 season and ending with a 4–2 defeat by UCLA in the semifinals of the 2004 NCAA Men's Tennis Tournament.

==== Women's tennis ====
The Fighting Illini women's tennis team began play in 1975. The women's tennis team has made 13 NCAA Tournament appearances in 1996, 1997, 1999, 2000, 2001, 2003, 2004, 2008, 2009, 2010, 2012, 2018 and 2019.

=== Track and field ===
==== Men's track and field ====
The men's Indoor Track and Field team has a total of 20 Big Ten Champion titles. For outdoor track and field the team has NCAA National Champions in 1921, 1927, 1944, 1946, and 1947. In addition, the team carries a total of 29 Big Ten Championships.

- Indoor Track and Field Big Ten Champions: 1912, 1913, 1914, 1916, 1920, 1921, 1924, 1928, 1946, 1947, 1951, 1952, 1953, 1954, 1958, 1977, 1981, 1987, 1988, 1989
- Outdoor Track and Field Big Ten Champions: 1907, 1909, 1913, 1914, 1920, 1921, 1922, 1924, 1927, 1928, 1929, 1934, 1945, 1946, 1947, 1951, 1952, 1953, 1954, 1958, 1959, 1960, 1975, 1977, 1987, 1988, 1989, 1994, 2015

==== Women's track and field ====
The Fighting Illini women's track and field team began play in 1976. The indoor track and field team won five Big Ten Championships in 1989, 1992, 1993, 1995 and 1996. The outdoor track and field team won the 1970 Association for Intercollegiate Athletics for Women national championship and six Big Ten Championships in 1988, 1989, 1992, 1995, 2005 and 2007.

=== Volleyball ===
Women's volleyball started in 1974., Since moving into Huff Hall from the Kenney Gym in 1990, the Illinois Volleyball team has remained in the top 10 in the nation for average home attendance. In 2013, the program broke its previous home attendance record, averaging 3,117 per match. Kenney Gym served as the initial home court from 1974 through the 1989 season. Since the founding of the volleyball program in 1974, the Fighting Illini have had 30+ winning seasons.

=== Wrestling ===
The current head coach of the University of Illinois Fighting Illini Jeremy Hunter, who won a national championship with Penn State in 2000.State Farm Center is the current home arena for the wrestling team, seating approximately 15,500. Huff Hall served as home arena to the team since 1925.

- Big Ten Champions: 1913, 1917, 1920, 1922, 1924, 1925, 1926, 1927, 1928, 1930, 1932, 1935, 1937, 1946, 1947, 1952, 2005
- The University of Illinois has had 24 NCAA National Champion wrestlers, with the most recent being Jesse Delgado in 2013 and 2014 and Isaiah Martinez in 2015 and 2016.

=== Illinois Fighting Illini varsity sports timeline ===
References: Men's basketball, Men's fencing, Men's hockey, Men's polo, Men's soccer, Men's water polo

== Former varsity sports ==
Illinois fencing won National Championships in 1956 and 1958. Fencing was dropped as a varsity sport in 1993. Men's swimming and diving was dropped as a varsity sport in 1993, but were Big Ten Champions in 1911, 1912 and 1913.

== Club sports ==
Club sports include men's ice hockey, women's ice hockey, men's lacrosse, rowing, men's and women's rugby, tennis, men's volleyball, men's and women's soccer, men's and women's ultimate frisbee, men's and women's cross country, men's and women's track and field, and men's and women's boxing.

=== Boxing ===
Both the men's and women's boxing teams compete as part of the United States Intercollegiate Boxing Association. Illinois hosted the USIBA national championships in 2018, and the men's team won the 2018 and 2019 tournaments. The women's team won the 2022 tournament.

=== Ice hockey ===
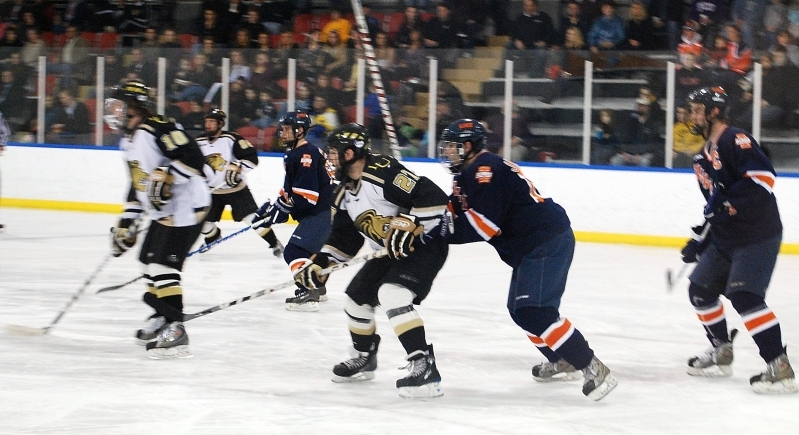
Illinois (in black) v Lindenwood men's ice hockey game in 2010

The men's ice hockey team has played in the Division I Central States Collegiate Hockey League conference since 1979, which is part of the American Collegiate Hockey Association (ACHA), winning national championships in 2005 and 2008, with runner-up finishes in 2009 and 2018. A second team competes in the Division II Mid-American Collegiate Hockey Association. A feasibility study published in March 2018, and commissioned by the NHL, NHLPA, and College Hockey, Inc., found a high probability of success for the hockey program to transition to NCAA Division I.

=== Men's rugby ===
Founded in 1963, the University of Illinois Men's Rugby Football Club plays in Division 1-A in the Big Ten Universities conference. The Illini have experienced success in college rugby, including winning several Big 10 championships in the 1980s and reaching the national semifinals in 1980, 1983 and 1985. The Illini play their home matches in Urbana at the Complex Fields.

=== Wheelchair basketball ===
The men's wheelchair basketball team was founded in 1948 by Timothy Nugent in response to a large number of disabled veterans using the G.I. Bill to attend the University of Illinois. Nugent later started a women's team in 1970. A total of 29 national championships are claimed between the men and women's teams.

=== Rowing ===
Founded in 2005, Illini Rowing is one of the youngest university rowing teams in the country. They practice on Clinton Lake and in the ARC. On Clinton Lake, they host the Illinois Collegiate Rowing Invitational where they race against many other midwestern universities. They compete across the country in the American Collegiate Rowing Association.

== Athletic facilities ==
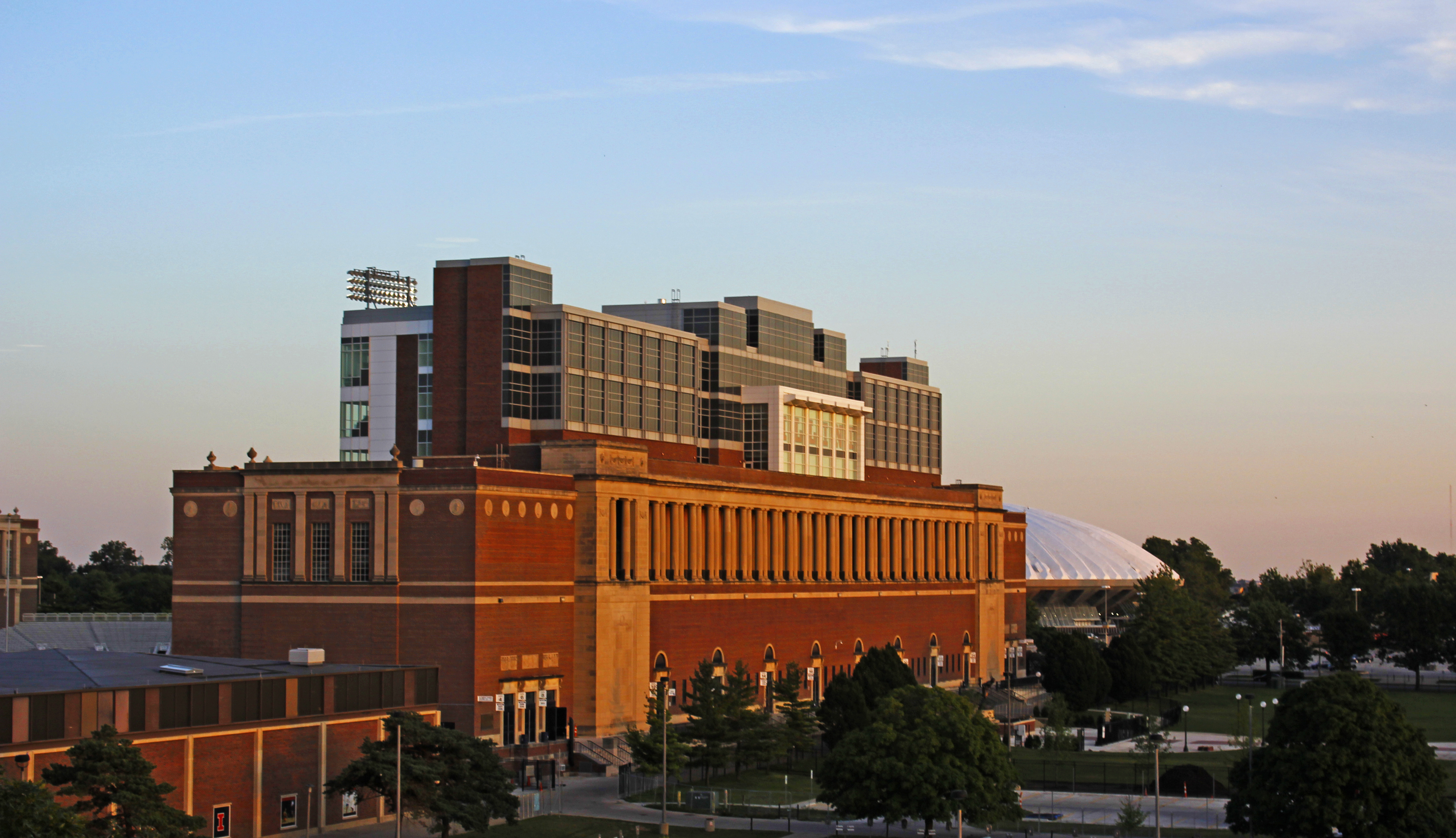
Memorial Stadium with State Farm Center in background

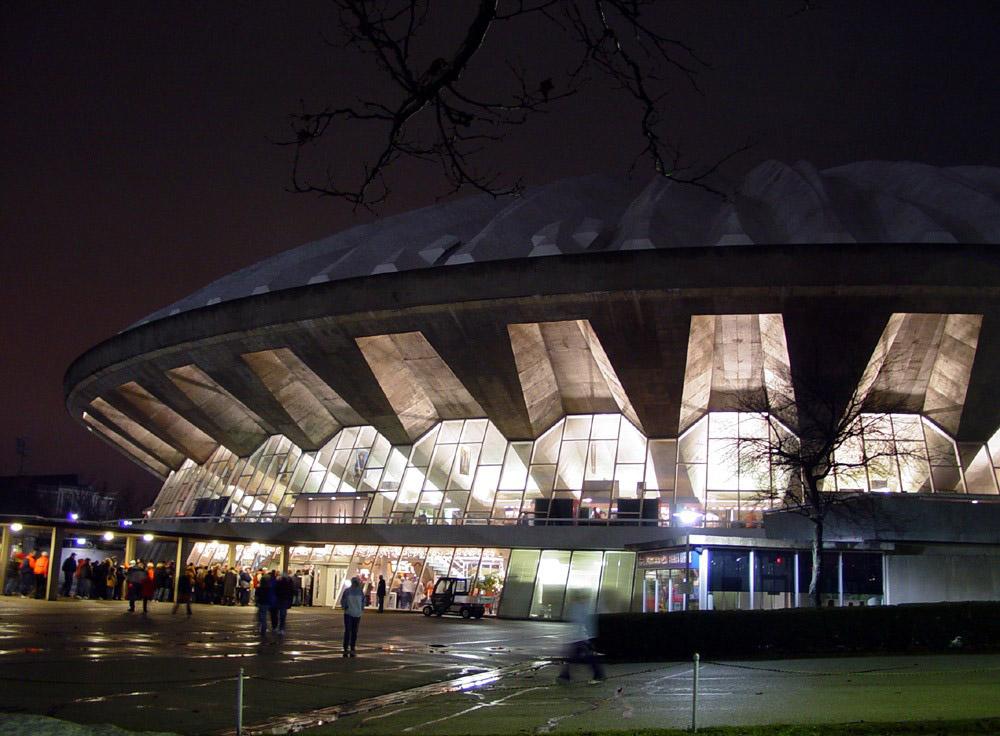
State Farm Center

=== Current facilities ===
- Activities and Recreation Center (ARC Pool) — Women's swimming and diving
- Atkins Tennis Center — Men's and women's tennis
- Eichelberger Field — Softball
- Huff Hall — Men's and women's gymnastics, women's volleyball
- Illinois Field — Baseball
- Demirjian Park — Women's soccer, Men's and women's outdoor track and field
- Memorial Stadium — Football
- State Farm Center (formerly Assembly Hall) — Men's and women's basketball, wrestling
- Atkins Golf Club at the University of Illinois — Men's and women's golf
- University of Illinois Arboretum — Men's and women's cross country
- University of Illinois Armory — Men's and women's indoor track and field

=== Practice facilities ===
- Demirjian Golf Practice Facility — Men's and women's golf indoor practice facility
- Irwin Indoor Practice Facility — Football, women's soccer, baseball, softball
- Kenney Gym and Kenney Gym Annex — Men's and women's gymnastics
- Lauritsen/Wohlers Outdoor Golf Practice Facility — Men's and women's golf outdoor practice facility
- U of I Orange and Blue Golf Courses — Men's and women's golf short-game practice center

=== Former facilities ===
- Huff Hall — Men's basketball (1925–1963)
- Original Illinois Field — Baseball (1884–1987) and football (1893–1922)
- Kenney Gym and Kenney Gym Annex — Men's basketball (1905–1925)

=== Club and intramural facilities ===
- Activities and Recreation Center — Intramural sports
- Complex Fields — Intramural sports
- CRCE — Intramural sports
- University of Illinois Ice Arena — Men's and women's club ice hockey, synchronized skating

== Illinois traditions ==
=== Marching Illini ===
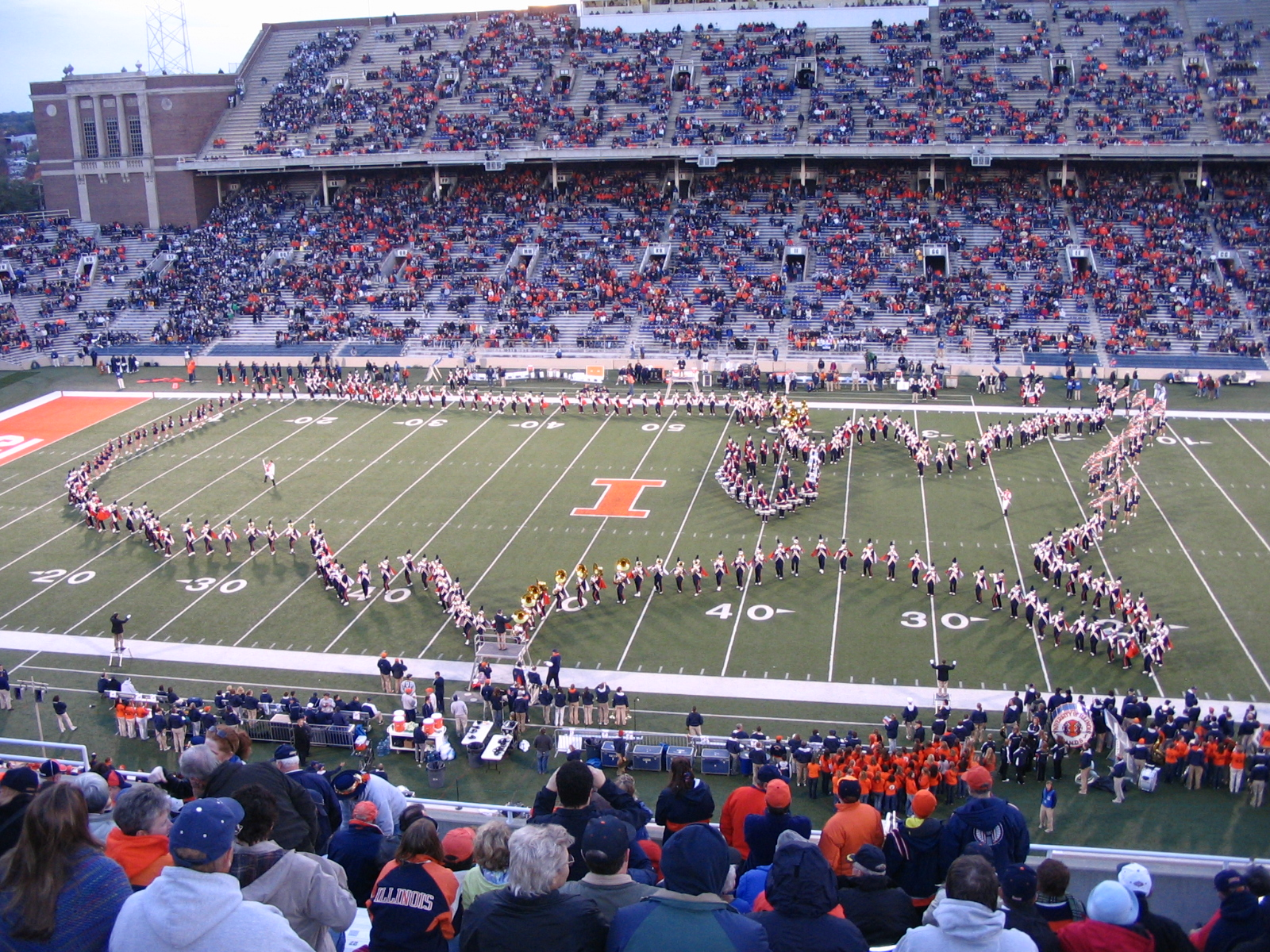
The Marching Illini in USA Formation during Patriotic Medley from the traditional pregame show

The Marching Illini is the marching band of the university. The Marching Illini is an organization which annually includes approximately 350 students. Part of the College of Fine and Applied Arts and the School of Music, the Marching Illini represent virtually every college, discipline, and major on the university's diverse Urbana-Champaign campus. The band primarily performs before, during, and after University of Illinois home football games. The band also performs an indoor concert at the Krannert Center for the Performing Arts featuring special lighting effects, performances by individual sections, and slightly pithy comic routines. The Sousa Archives and Center for American Music houses a collection of University Band recordings and performances and recording sessions from 1940 to 1987. The band has several traditions such as the Pregame Show, Three-In-One, Illinois Loyalty and Oskee Wow-Wow.

=== Illinois Loyalty ===
Illinois Loyalty is the main school song of the university. It was first performed on March 3, 1906, and is one of the oldest songs of its kind in the United States. The song was written by Thacher Howland Guild, instructor in rhetoric and a member of the band's solo cornet section. Due to the song's length, it is normally played only at the beginning, halftime, and end of football games.

=== Oskee Wow-Wow ===
Oskee Wow-Wow is the official fight song of the University of Illinois. Most commonly, it is played "from the hold" at the start of the chorus, when the "O" in "Oskee Wow-Wow" is held out. This version is played after first downs and touchdowns in football, and leading into time outs in basketball. Coincidentally, the buzzers at nearly every arena are in the same chord as the hold.

For many years, the band started playing the song "from the top" toward the end of the warmup period in basketball. When conducted correctly, the "hold" is played just as the buzzer sounds.

=== Oskee Wow-Wow yell ===
The Oskee Wow-Wow yell is a University of Illinois spirit yell originated in 1899. The yell was modified in 1912 and 1916.

== Athletic directors ==
- Edward K. Hall (1892–1894)
- Fred D. Dodge (1894–1895)
- Henry H. Everett (1895–1898)
- Jacob K. Shell (1898–1901)
- George Huff (1901–1936)
- Wendell S. Wilson (1936–1941)
- Douglas R. Mills (1941–1966)
- Leslie Bryan (interim) (1966–1967)
- Gene Vance (1967–1972)
- Charles E. Flynn (interim) (1972)
- Cecil Coleman (1972–1979)
- Ray Eliot (interim) (1979)
- Neale Stoner (1980–1988)
- Ron Guenther (interim) (1988)
- Karol A. Kahrs (interim) (1988)
- John Mackovic (1988–1991)
- Robert Todd (interim) (1991–1992)
- Ron Guenther (1992–2011)
- Mike Thomas (2011–2015)
- Paul Kowalczyk (interim) (2015)
- Josh Whitman (2016–present)

== Notable alumni ==
The university has a number of notable alumni and administrators in the world of athletics. In football, notable Alumni include Dick Butkus, Red Grange, Jeff George, Simeon Rice, Ray Nitschke and George Halas. Famous basketball alumni include Dee Brown, Deron Williams, Luther Head, Derek Harper, Nick Anderson, Chuck Carney, Brian Cook, Kendall Gill, Kenny Battle, Steve Bardo, Marcus Liberty, Deon Thomas, Jerry Colangelo, and Johnny Orr. Notable athletes in baseball include Lou Boudreau, Hoot Evers and Ken Holtzman. The university has also a number of Olympic athletes that include George Kerr, Don Laz, Daniel Kinsey, Harold Osborn, Bob Richards, and Justin Spring,

== Mascot controversy ==
From 1926 to 2007, Chief Illiniwek was the symbol for the Fighting Illini. Chief Illiniwek was a Native American symbol portrayed by a white student. Chief Illiniwek symbolized the Illini, a confederation of indigenous tribes who historically had inhabited much of present-day Illinois; however the clothing and regalia for the symbol was from the Sioux nation. Chief Illiniwek would perform during halftime at Illinois football and basketball games, wearing a feathered headdress and buckskin clothes, and dancing while the marching band played "Three in One", an arrangement of three original songs. It was customary for Illinois fans and attendees to raise their arms at the end of the halftime proceedings and, in unison, yell "chief".

In 2005, the Chief was one of 18 mascots cited as "hostile or abusive" by the NCAA in a policy that banned schools from full participation in postseason activities as long as they continued to use such mascots. The University of Illinois retired Chief Illiniwek in 2007. Debate about the Chief has continued to this day. The university chancellor appointed a Commission on Native Imagery to recommend ways "to provide closure, healing and reconciliation... to facilitate the establishment of new traditions... [and] to honor and partner with the Native Nations for whom Illinois is their ancestral home."

The Fighting Illini are one of two Big Ten programs that do not have a mascot. (The other being the Wolverines.)

=== The Kingfisher ===
In the 2020 student elections, the student body voted 4222 to 3597 for a preliminary proposal to adopt a new mascot, the belted kingfisher. The female belted kingfisher, which is "naturally true to the orange and blue," would be the first female mascot in the Big Ten. The referendum was downplayed by the university administration, which stated that the "results will be shared with the university administration and the board of trustees but will not result in a new mascot at this time."

After the student referendum, the University Senate voted 105–2 in an advisory vote to endorse the belted kingfisher as the new mascot. In 2023, students and faculty created a Kingfisher costume and the proposed unofficial mascot began making appearances at campus events. Multiple Indigenous organizations have endorsed adopting the Kingfisher as a mascot. In the 2025 student elections, the student body reaffirmed in a 76.36% supermajority vote support for adopting an athletic mascot.
