= Craig Tiley =

South African tennis player

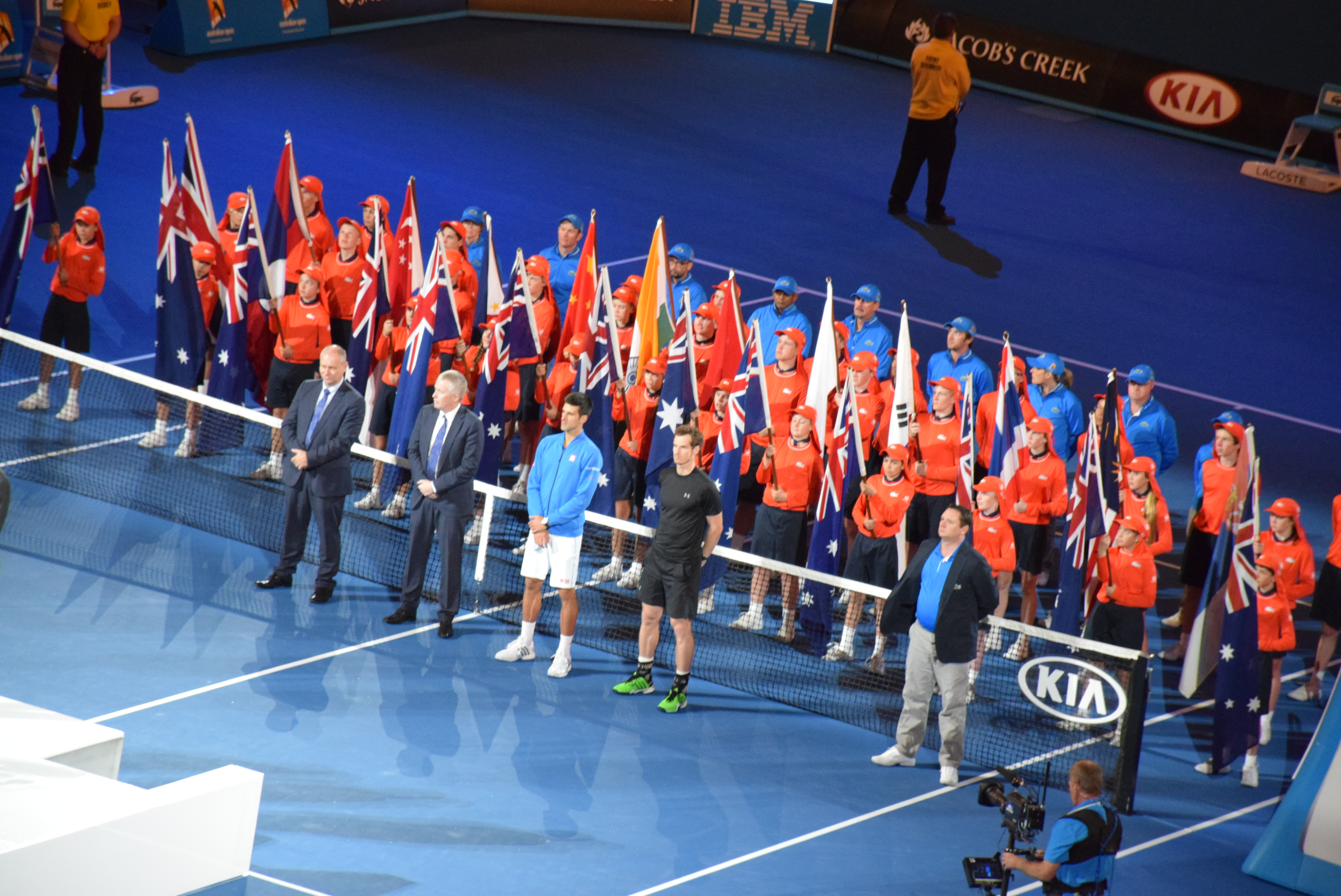

Biographical details
- Born: 1961 or 1962 (age 64–65); Durban, South Africa
- Education: Stellenbosch University; Tyler Junior College; University of Texas at Tyler

Coaching career (HC unless noted)
- 1993: Illinois (Interim)
- 1994–2005: Illinois

Administrative career (AD unless noted)
- 2005–2013: Tennis Australia (Director of Player Development)
- 2006–2026: Tennis Australia (Australian Open Director)
- 2013–2026: Tennis Australia (CEO)

Head coaching record
- Overall: 274–77 (.781)

Accomplishments and honors

Championships
- NCAA (2003); ITA National Team Indoor (2003, 2004); Big Ten Conference (1997, 1998, 1999, 2000, 2001, 2002, 2003, 2004, 2005); Big Ten Tournament (1999, 2000, 2002, 2003, 2004, 2005)

Awards
- ITA Men's Collegiate Tennis Hall of Fame (2010); 2x Wilson/ITA Division I National Coach of the Year (1999, 2003); 8x Big Ten Coach of the Year (1998, 1999, 2000, 2001, 2002, 2003, 2004, 2005)

Records
- Most wins in Illinois history (274); NCAA record 64 consecutive wins

Craig Tiley (born 1961 or 1962) is a South African tennis executive and retired U.S. college tennis coach. Tiley is the current CEO of Tennis Australia, which is the governing body that oversees tennis in Australia. He was also director of the Grand Slam tournament Australian Open.

As a college coach he led the Illinois Fighting Illini men's tennis team to National Collegiate Athletic Association (NCAA) Division I national championship in 2003 and ITA National Team Indoor Championships in 2003 and 2004.

== Early years ==
Tiley was born in Durban, and attended high school in Johannesburg. He began playing tennis at the age of 12 and achieved a top ranking as an amateur in South Africa, which enabled Tiley to play in satellite tournaments throughout Europe from 1983 to 1986.

== College and military service ==
Tiley attended the Stellenbosch University in Stellenbosch, where he played for the Maties men's tennis team from 1980 to 1983. He graduated from Stellenbosch with a bachelor's degree in economics in 1983. After graduating, Tiley completed compulsory military service by serving in the South African Army. He then moved to the United States in 1986 to enroll in the Professional Tennis Management program at Tyler Junior College located in Tyler, Texas. Tiley then continued on to the University of Texas at Tyler where he earned his master's degree in kinesiology.

== Coaching career ==
Tiley was hired by Ron Guenther in 1992 at the University of Illinois at Urbana Champaign to serve as the Director of Instruction at the Atkins Tennis Center. After Illinois Fighting Illini men's tennis head coach Neil Adams left following the 1992 season, Guenther offered Tiley the job for the 1993 season on an interim basis and Tiley was named the permanent head coach following the 1993 season.

In 1998, Tiley assumed coaching duties as the captain of South Africa for the Davis Cup, and remained in this position until 2001.

Tiley led the Illinois men's tennis team to ITA National Team Indoor Championships in 2003 and 2004, and reached the championship match three other times in 1998, 1999, and 2002. He also led Illinois to a 32–0 record and an NCAA Men's Tennis Championship in 2003. He received his second Wilson/ITA Division I National Coach of the Year award following the 2003 season.

Tiley coached Illinois to their record for longest consecutive win streak in NCAA history at 64 matches, spanning from their first match of the 2002–2003 season and ending with a 4–2 defeat by UCLA in the semi-finals of the 2004 NCAA Men's Tennis Tournament.

== Professional player development ==
During his time at Illinois, Tiley coached the following collegiate men's tennis players who went on to play professionally with the Association of Tennis Professionals.

- Kevin Anderson
- Ryler DeHeart
- Amer Delić
- Graydon Oliver
- Rajeev Ram
- Brian Wilson

Tiley has also worked as a personal coach for professional tennis player Wayne Ferreira.

== Administrative career ==
Tiley left Illinois in 2005 to accept a position with Tennis Australia to serve as their Director of Player Development. In 2006 he was named Director of the Australian Open in addition to his prior duties for Tennis Australia. After Tennis Australia's CEO stepped down in 2013, Tiley was selected as the successor.

There were calls for Tiley to resign from Tennis Australia after he facilitated a travel visa for Novak Djokovic to play in the 2022 Australian Open despite earlier advice from the Australian government that Djokovic's recent COVID-19 infection did not warrant the provision of a medical exemption. Djokovic was deported from Australia and did not compete in the Open.

In February 2026, Tiley announced his intention to resign from Tennis Australia to accept a job as CEO of the United States Tennis Association once his successor has been appointed. Tiley will be replaced by former NRL CEO Andrew Abdo in August 2026.
