= Clinton Lake =

Clinton Lake may refer to thec following reservoirs in the United States:

- Clinton Lake (Kansas)
- Clinton Lake (Illinois)
