= Illini Rowing =

Illinois Rowing Club
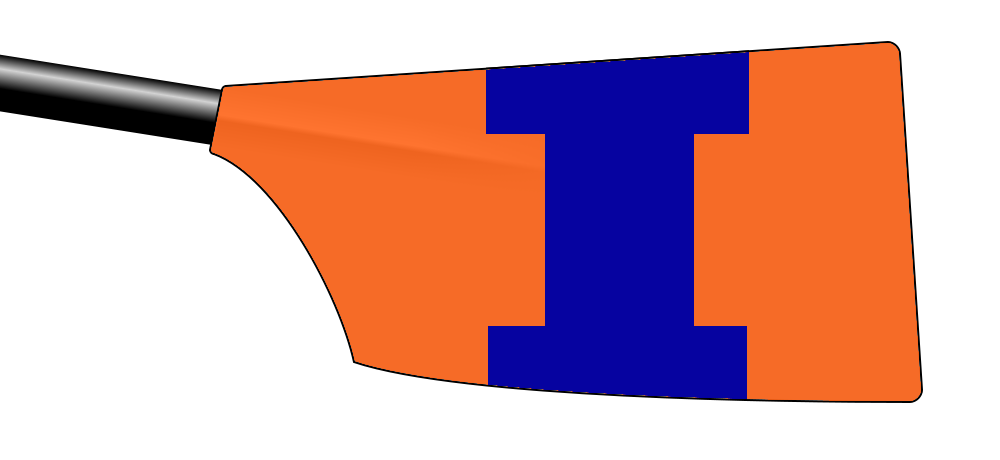
- Location: Champaign-Urbana, IL
- Home water: Clinton Lake
- Founded: 2005
- Key people: Peter Filice (Head Coach: 2024-present)
- Affiliations: University of Illinois Urbana-Champaign, American Collegiate Rowing Association
- Website: illinirowing.com

Illini Rowing is a club college rowing program that represents the University of Illinois Urbana-Champaign. Both the men's and women's teams that make up the program are members of the American Collegiate Rowing Association (ACRA) in the Great Lakes Region. The program operates as a registered student organization (RSO) at the University of Illinois. The university does not currently have an NCAA varsity team and the club program is the highest level of competitive rowing offered by the university. As of 2014, the program has attained two ACRA national titles for their wins in the Women's Novice Four event in both 2012 and 2014 at the ACRA National Championships. The Illini Rowing Men's crew has captured the team's only state champion titles, winning in both 2013 and 2014. The Women's team has fallen short each year, losing to the University of Chicago both years.

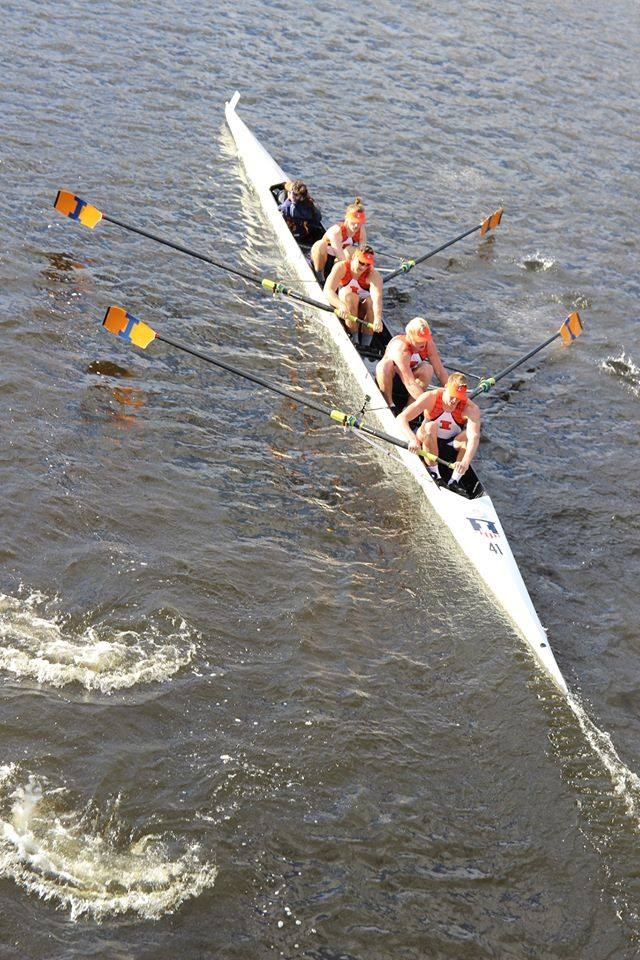
Men's Varsity 4+ Boat at Head of the Charles

== Facilities ==
The Illini Rowing team's on-water practices are held at the Clinton Lake Rowing Center in Farmer City, Illinois. This is also where the team hosts the Illinois Collegiate Rowing Invitational. The Clinton Lake Rowing Center was built by the team in 2016 after leaving their previous practice site on Homer Lake in Homer, Illinois. Future developments for the center are planned including the construction of a 3-bay boathouse, improved dock systems, and an expansion to a fully buoyed 8-lane course. Off-water practices are usually held at the Activities and Recreation Center on the University of Illinois campus. The team also uses it as a base to stores its ergometers and host tryouts.

== Illinois Collegiate Rowing Invitational ==
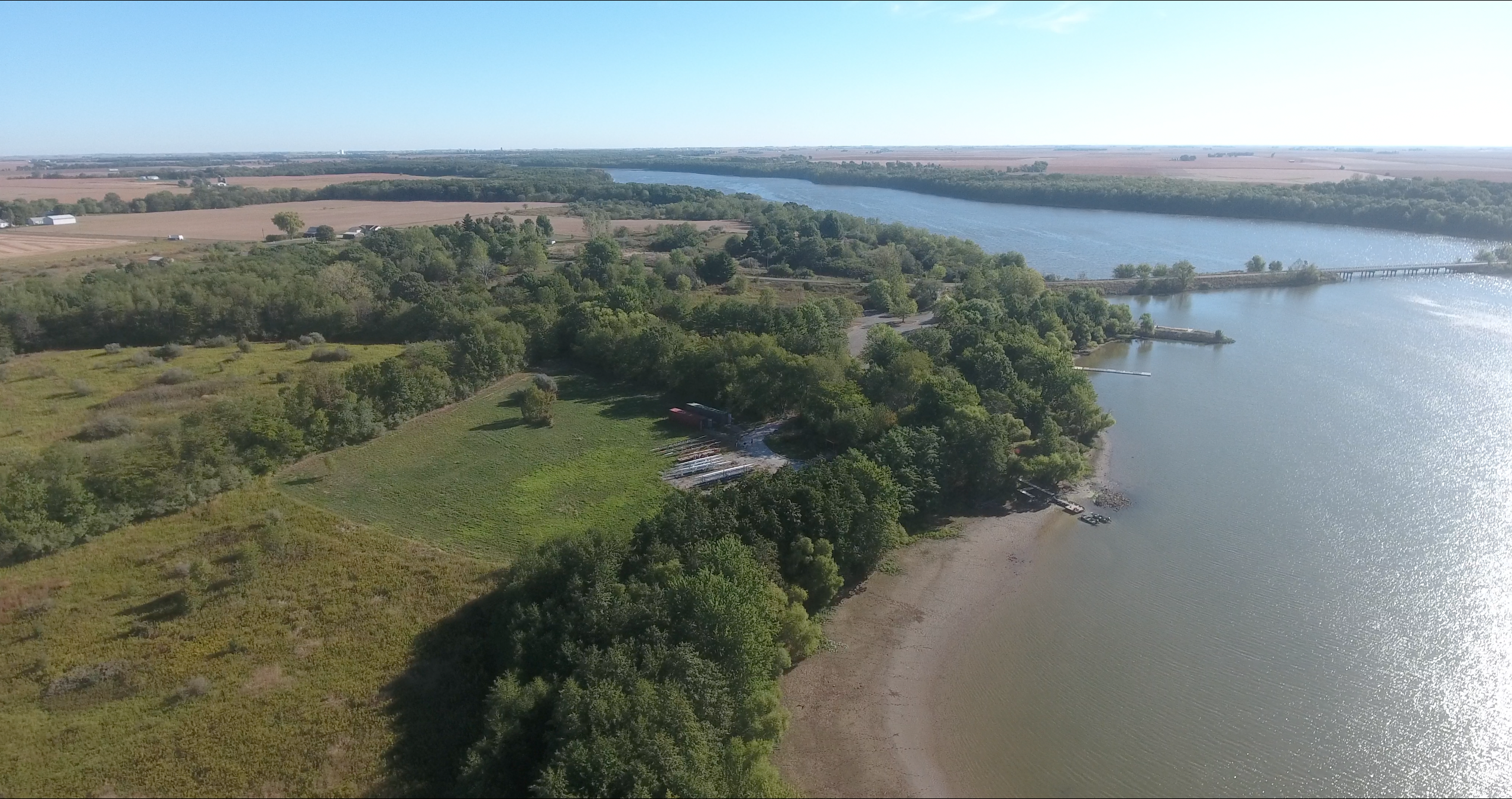
Drone footage of the Clinton Lake Rowing Center.

The Illini Rowing Team has hosted the Illinois Collegiate Rowing Invitational (ICRI) annually since 2013. Originally only five clubs were invited. The regatta has been growing steadily. In 2018, fifteen teams from across the Midwest competed. ICRI takes place every year on the third Saturday in April at the Clinton Lake Rowing Center outside of Farmer City. The Illini Rowing Team have set up a six-lane two-kilometer racecourse on the lake. Since 2018, the site has also been hosting the Illinois Junior Rowing Invitational for junior clubs in the region. It takes place the Sunday after ICRI.
