= University of Illinois Arboretum =

Arboretum in Urbana, Illinois, US

Coordinates: 40.0939°N 88.2170°W

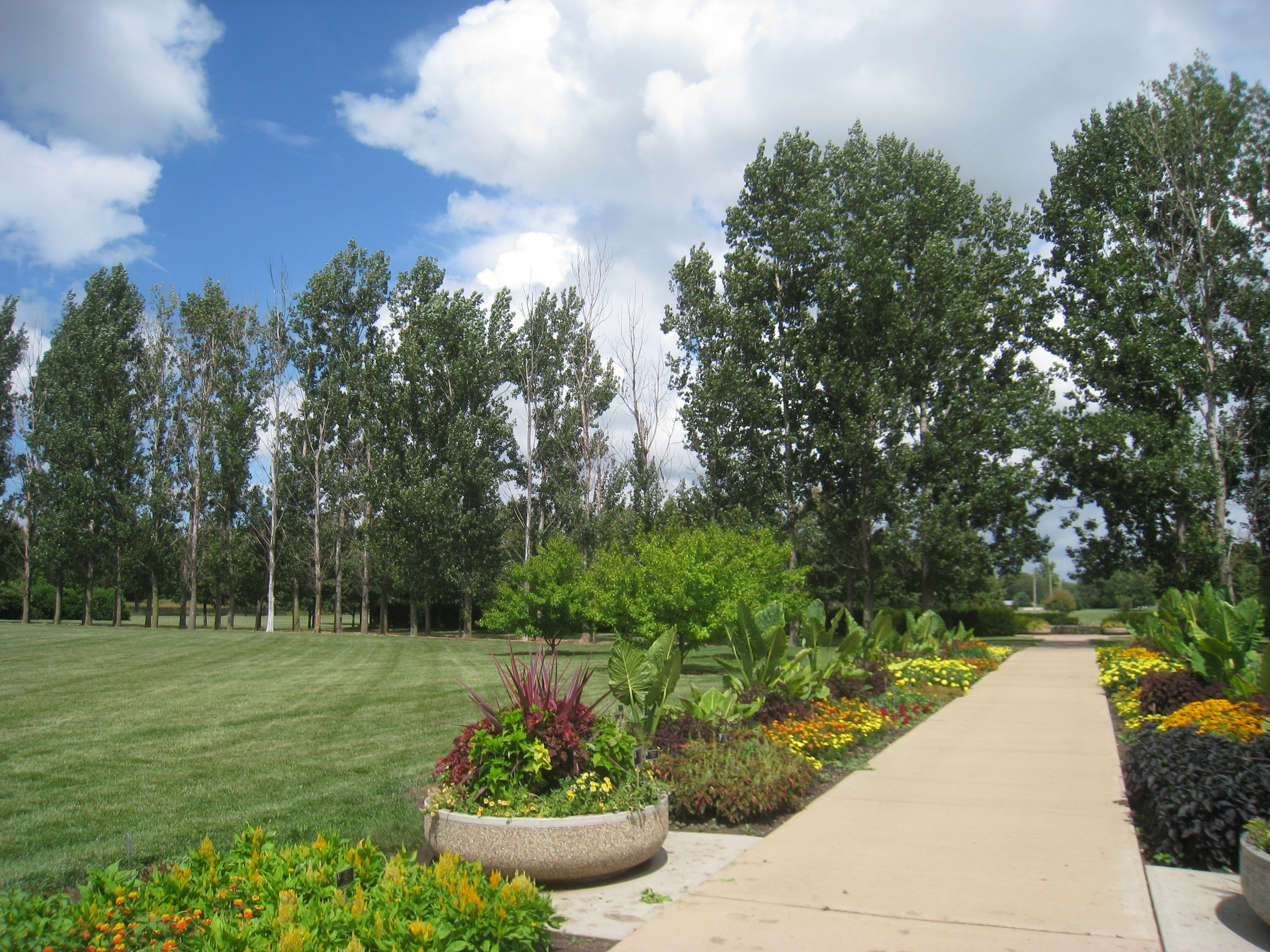
- University of Illinois Arboretum
- Interactive map of University of Illinois Arboretum
- Location: intersection of Florida and Lincoln Avenue, Urbana, Illinois
- Area: 160 acres (65 ha)
- Website: Official website

The University of Illinois Arboretum (160 acres (65 ha)) is a new arboretum, with gardens, currently under construction on the University of Illinois Urbana-Champaign campus. The arboretum is located at the intersection of Florida and Lincoln Avenue, Urbana, Illinois, and open daily without charge.

The arboretum has been constructed on the university's south campus farmlands. As of 2017, developed sections are as follows:

- Welcome Garden – an entrance and meeting place.
- Japan House – tea garden (2002), dry or Zen garden (2003). The house itself contains three tea rooms, and is otherwise used for classes and meetings; it is not generally open to the public.
- Hartley Garden (1994) – a 3-acre (12,000 m^{2}) sunken garden with All American Selections trial ground and annual and perennial beddings.
- Idea Garden – six areas including borders, ornamentals, vegetables, children's, and Special Projects.
- Sen Cherry Tree Alleé (2008) – cherry trees added to the Japan House.
- Frank W. Kari walkway (2011) – 1/3 mile and winding around arboretum ponds with educational signs.
- Hosta Garden – native Illinois prairie plants.

== Sports facilities ==
=== Cross country ===
The arboretum is the home course for the Illinois Fighting Illini men's and women's cross country teams since 2003. There are four courses at the arboretum with 4 km, 5 km, 6 km and 8 km distances.

== Gallery ==
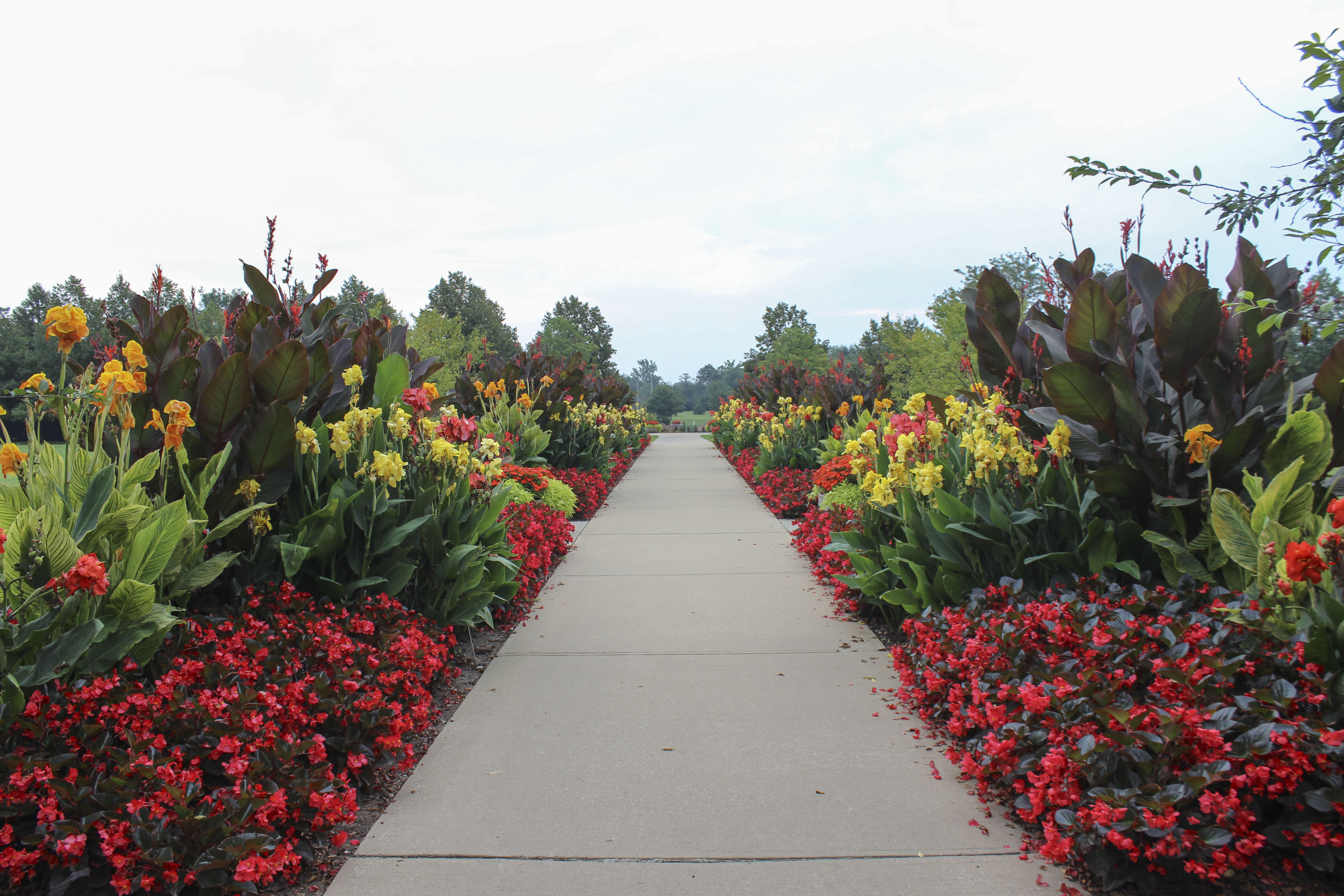
Welcome Walk.

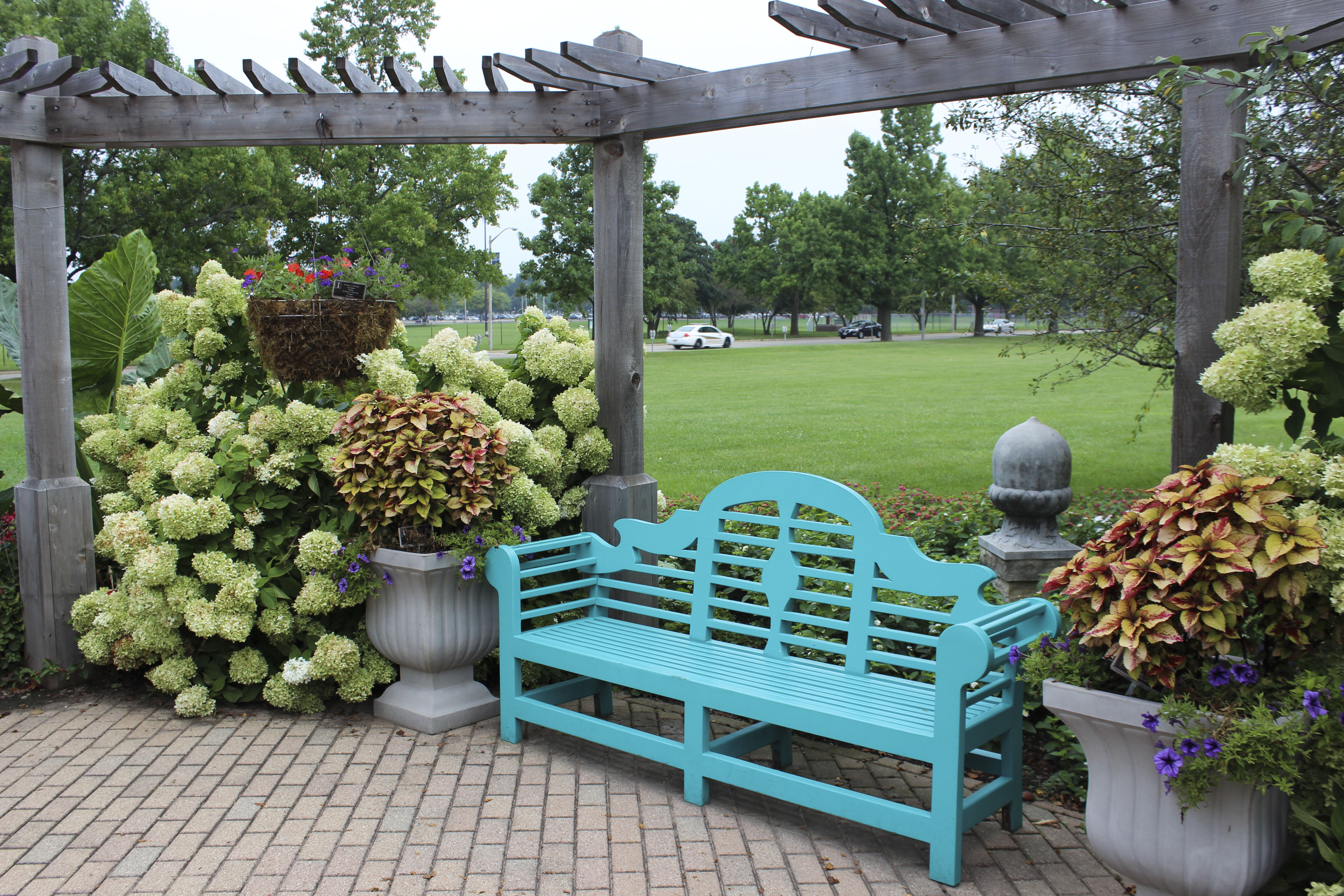
Welcome Garden.

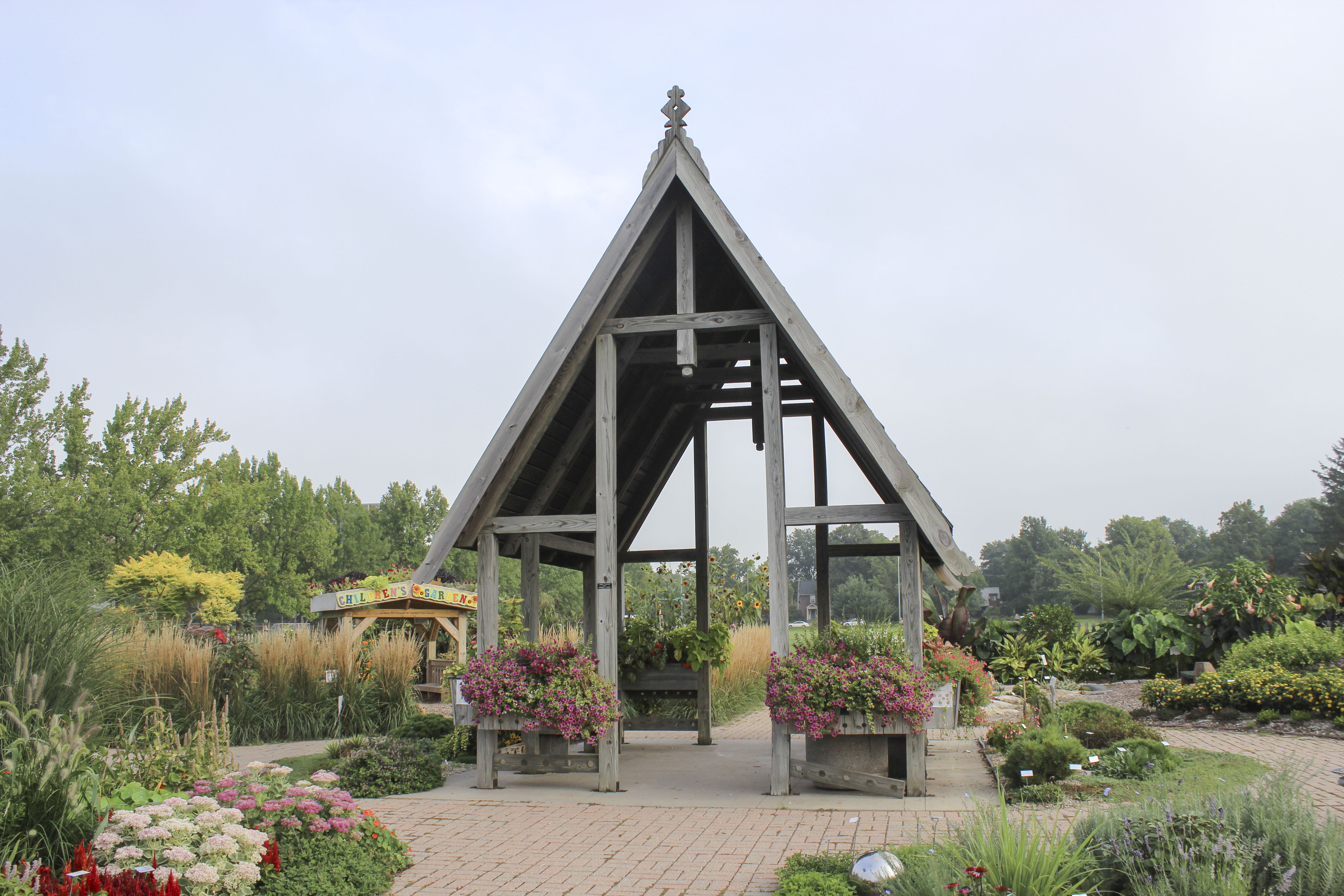
Children's Gazebo and Garden.

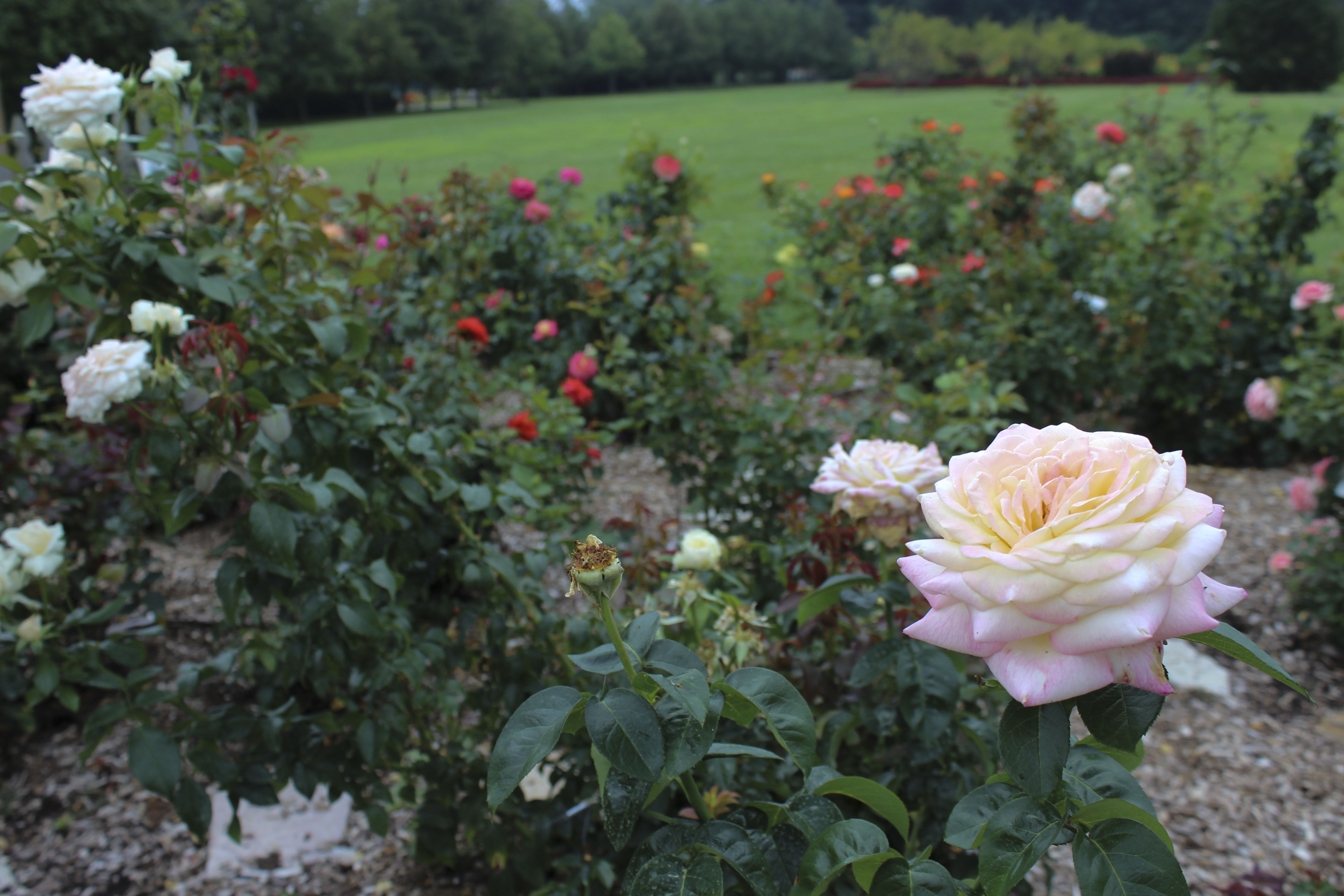
In the Rose Garden

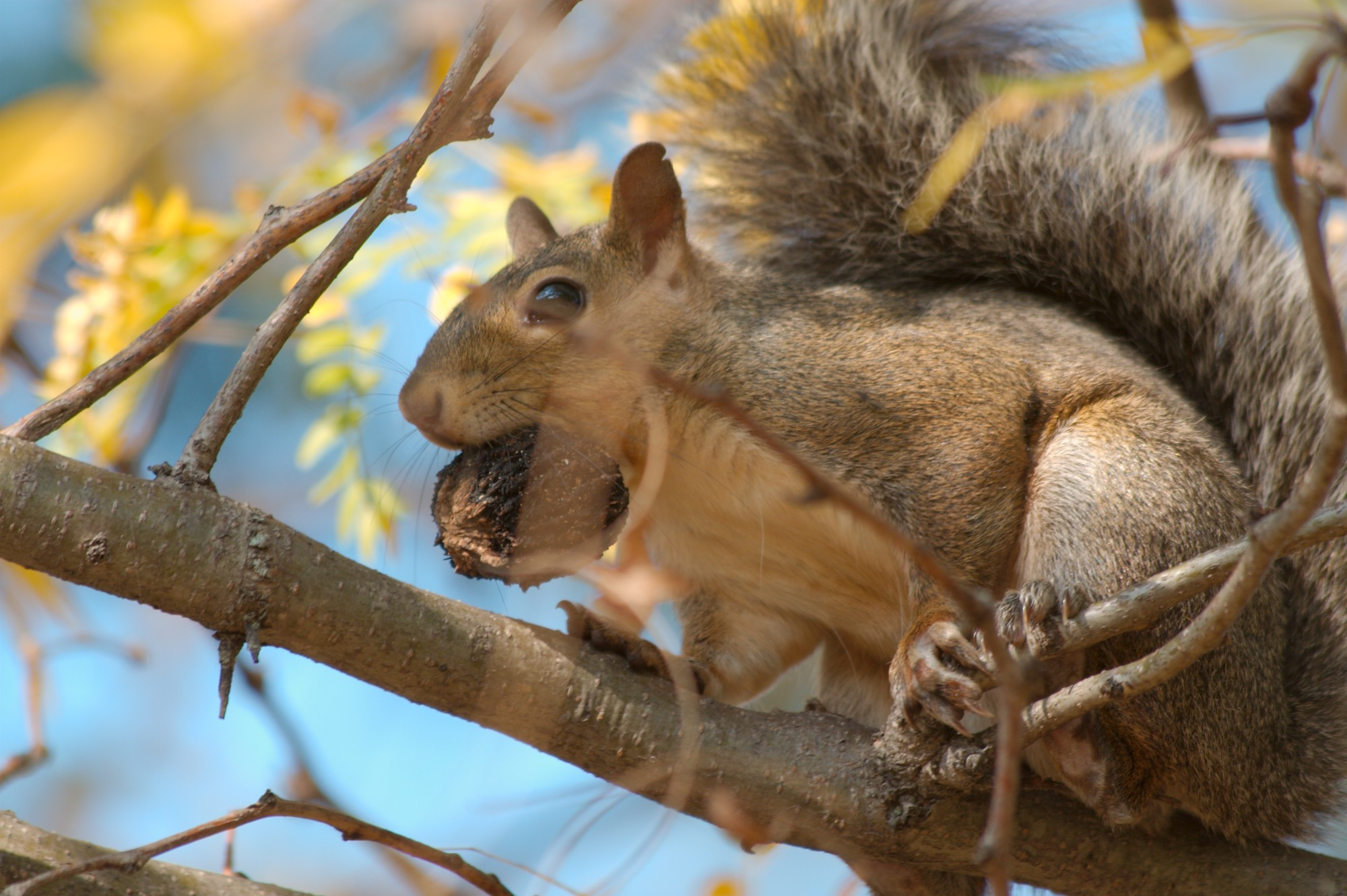

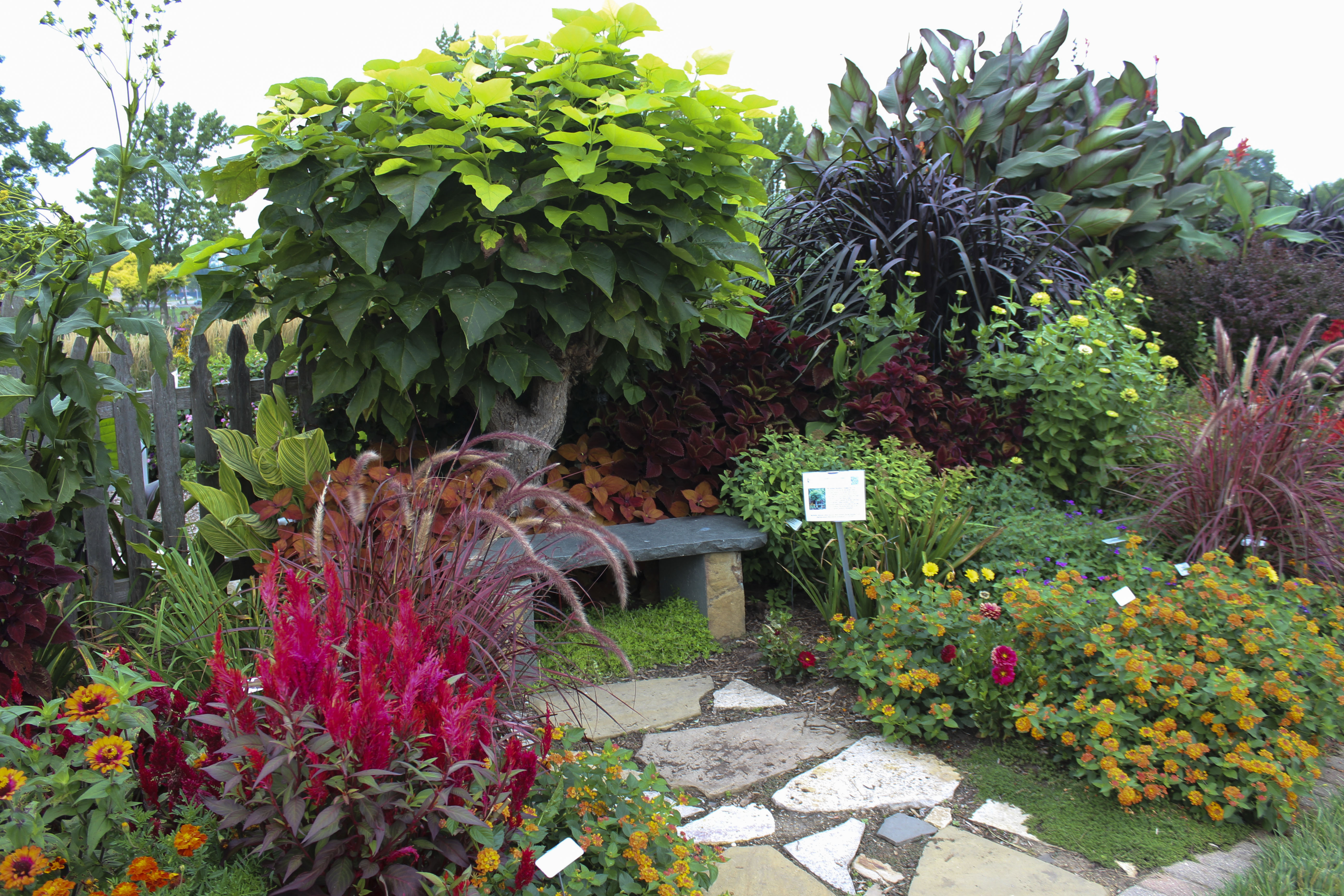
Part of the Idea Garden.

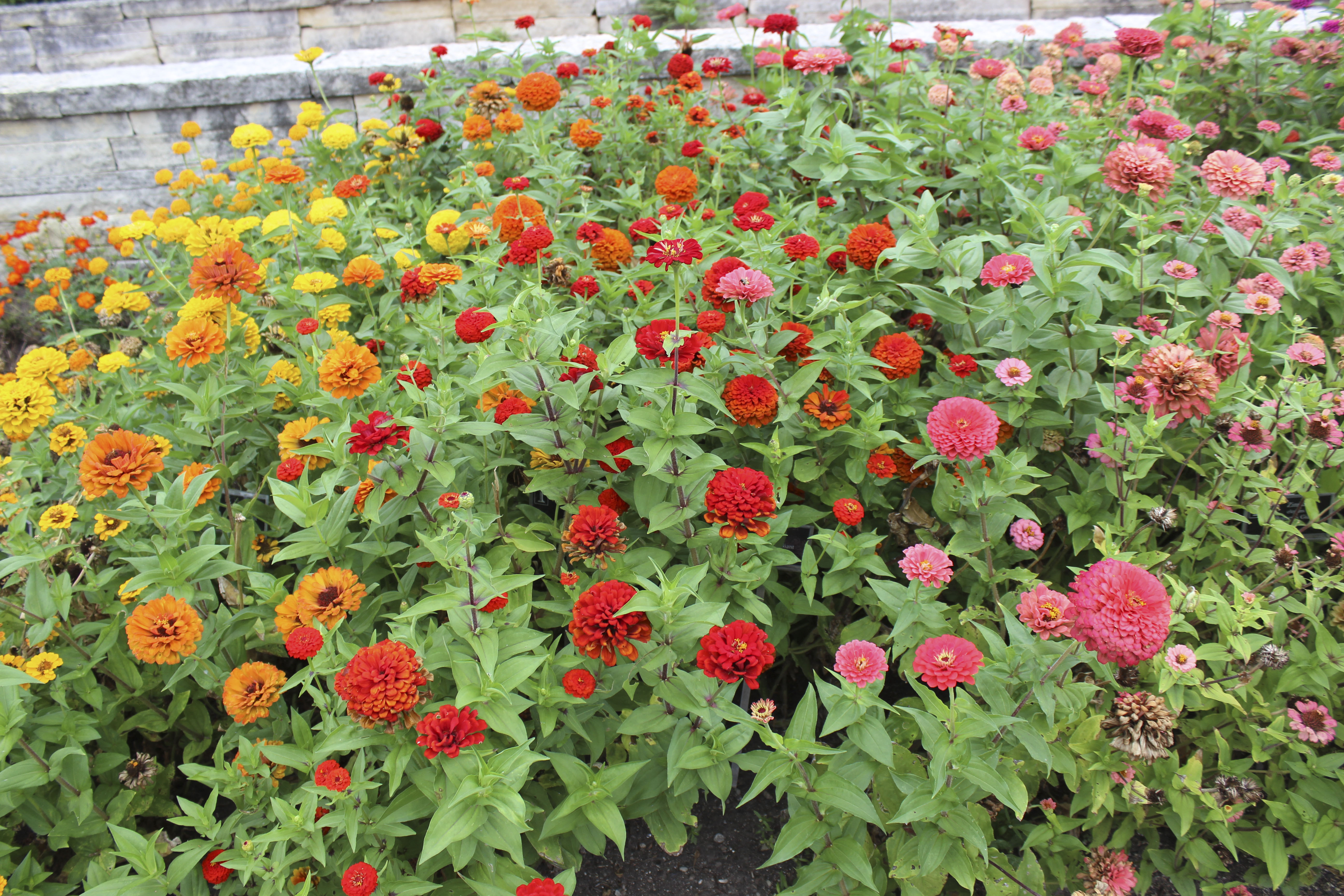
Zinnias in bloom.

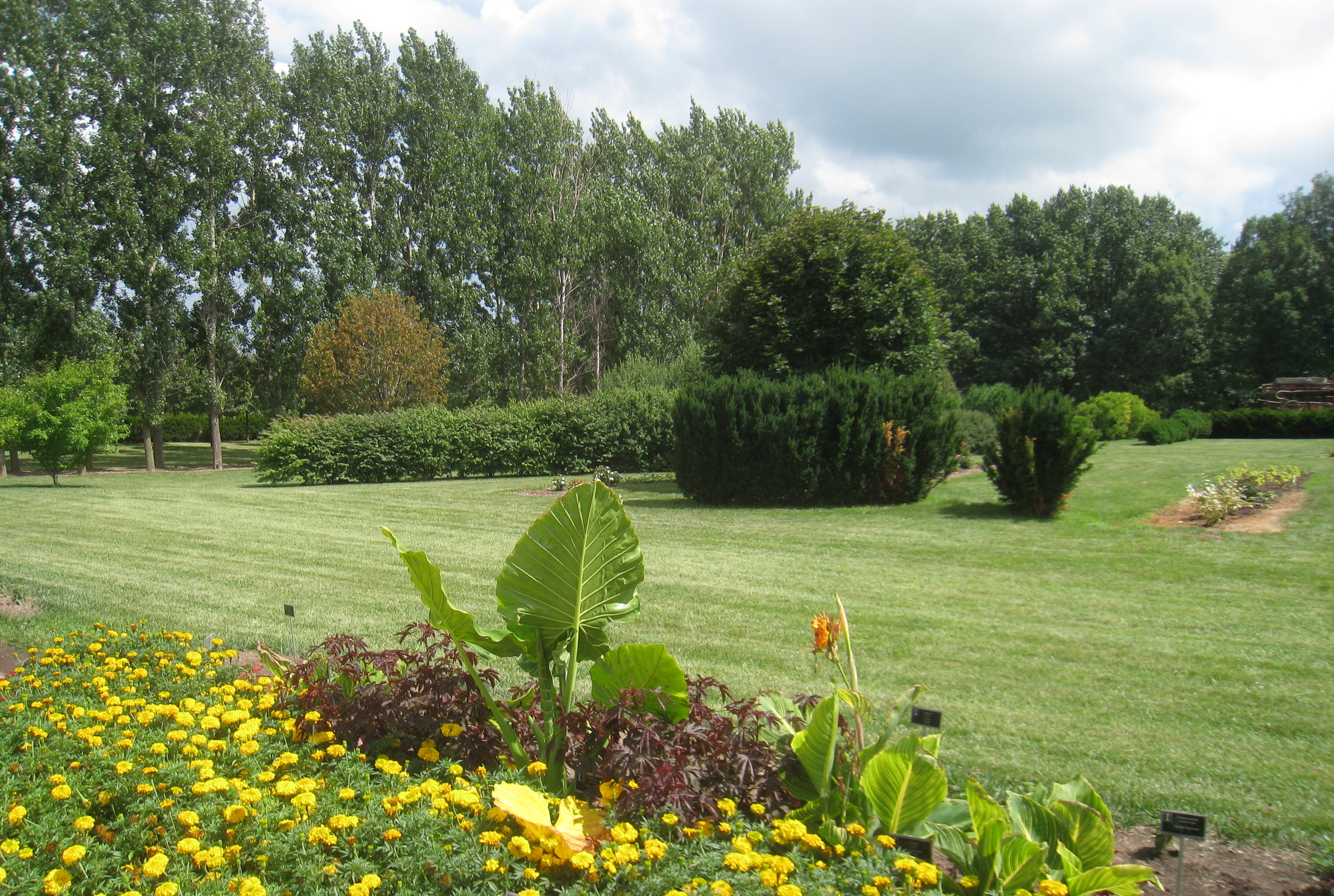

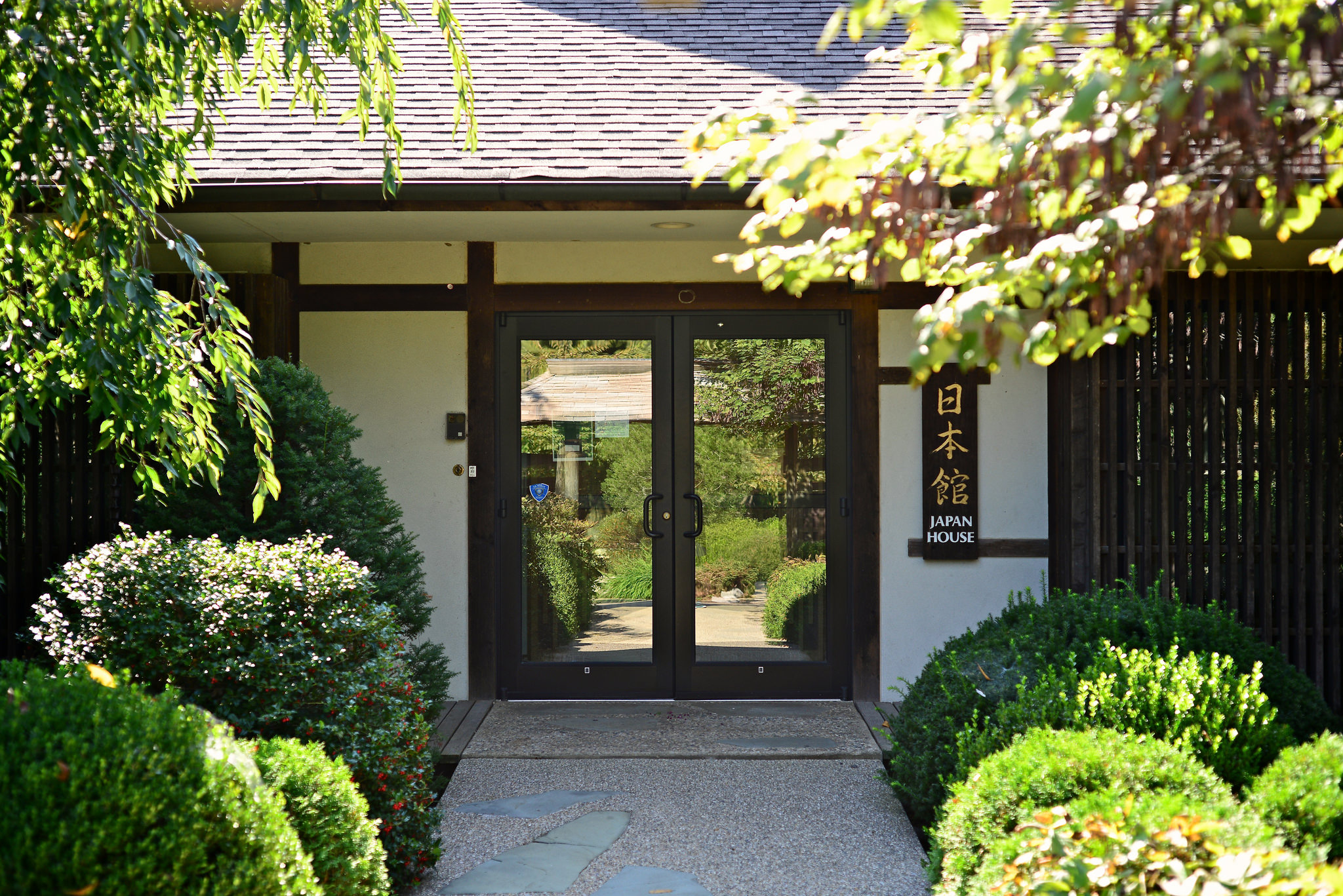
Japan House

Reference map of the arboretum.

== See also ==
- List of botanical gardens in the United States
