= Activities and Recreation Center (UIUC) =

Athletic facility in Champaign, Illinois

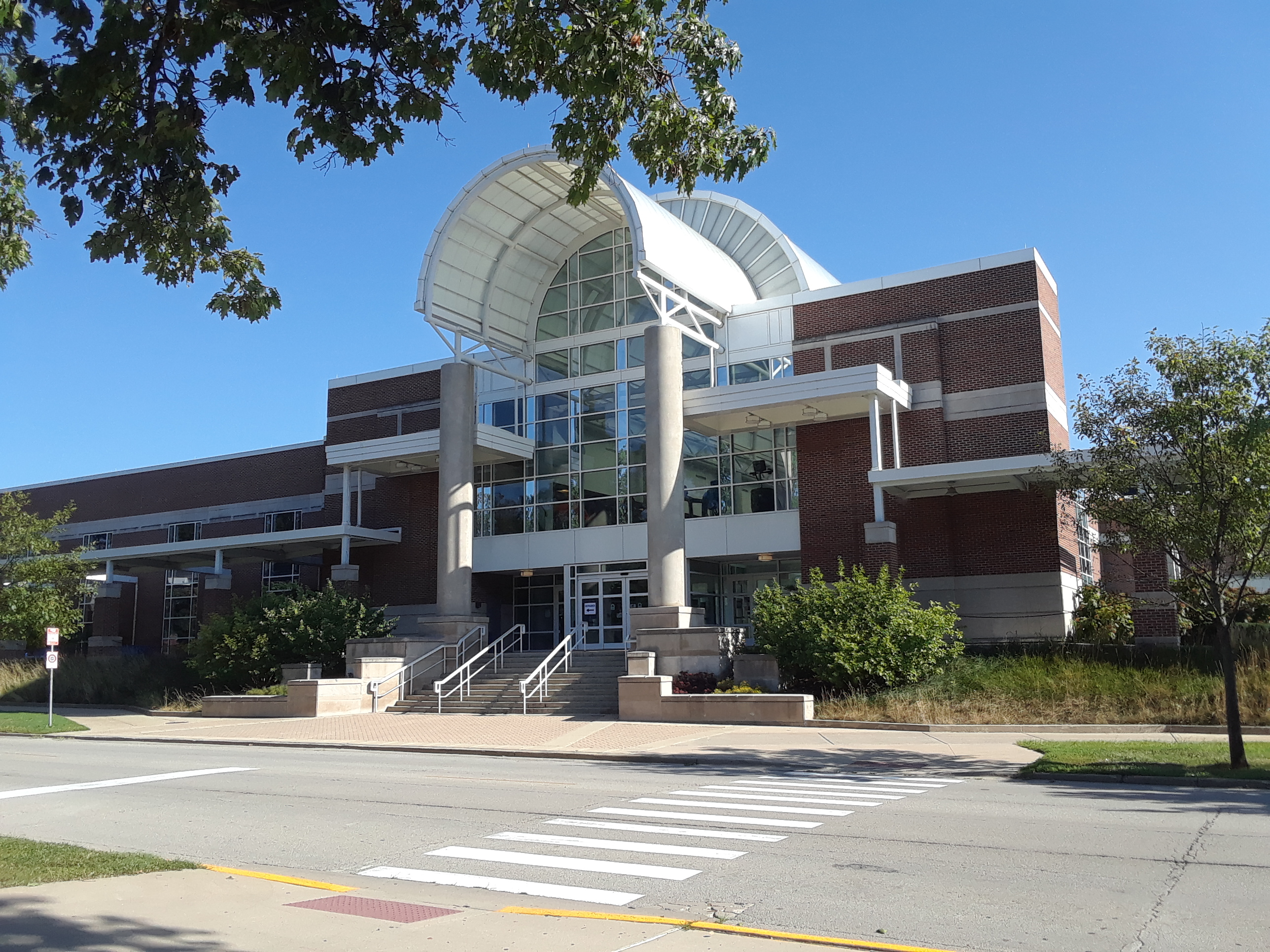
- Interactive map of Activities and Recreation Center
- Location: 201 East Peabody; Champaign, Illinois 61820; United States
- Coordinates: 40.101313°N 88.236018°W
- Owner: University of Illinois at Urbana–Champaign
- Operator: University of Illinois at Urbana–Champaign
- Public transit: MTD

Construction
- Opened: 1971
- Renovated: 2008

Tenant
- Illinois Fighting Illini women's swimming and diving (NCAA)

The Activities and Recreation Center, more commonly known as the ARC, is an athletic facility at the University of Illinois at Urbana–Champaign for current university students, members and guests. According to the university, Activities and Recreation Center is "one of the country's largest on-campus recreation centers".

It is also the home venue for the Illinois Fighting Illini women's swimming and diving team.

== Location ==
ARC is located at 201 East Peabody, which is approximately 100 meters away from the Snyder Hall and the Scott Hall, and 500 meters away from the newly constructed Ikenberry Common. It is also directly north of Memorial Stadium (Champaign).

== History ==
The first recreation facility on campus, IMPE (Intramural Physical Education building), was opened in 1971. According to the university, Activities and Recreation Center is "one of the country's largest on-campus recreation centers". In 2008, after IMPE was renovated and reconstructed, its name was changed to ARC.

=== Reconstruction ===
A group of University of Illinois students created a campaign for a comprehensive expansion and renovation of IMPE and WIMPE, called Bigger, Better, Campus Rec Renovation. University students were asked to vote on a referendum asked for an overall $77 per student increase in general fees for students over the next 2 years, to provide more recreation opportunities, reduce overcrowding, address space issues, and meet the needs of university students. Out of 5,459 voters 4,020 persons (74%) voted in favor of the referendum

The reconstruction began on March 17, 2006, and the building was reopened in August 2008. The project's cost was $221 million.

== Facilities ==
The total size of the ARC is 340,000 square feet (32,000 m^{2}), consisting of 276,000 square feet (25,600 m^{2}) of dry facilities and 64,000 square feet (5,900 m^{2}) of wet facilities.

=== Indoor pool ===
The indoor pool of the Activities and Recreation center is located on the 1st floor of the facility building. It is a 50 meter by 25 yards pool of eight competitive lanes and is the home venue for the Illinois Fighting Illini women's swimming and diving team. The size of the indoor pool area is 22,907 square feet (2,128.1 m^{2}).

The ARC indoor pool includes a 1,175 square-foot locker room, sauna and meeting rooms along with a scoreboard and video screen. A Hall of Fame area is also located inside the aquatic center.

=== Diving area ===
A separate diving area is adjacent to the indoor pool. It is the diving well for the Illinois Fighting Illini women's swimming and diving team. The diving facilities include two one-meter springboards over 13-1/2 feet of water and two three-meter springboards over 14 feet of water.

=== Outdoor pool ===
An outdoor pool can be found on the west side of the Activities and Recreation center building. The pool is a 50-meter, 4 lanes standard pool. It also contains a diving well. The outdoor pool is usually open during summer and fall. During the winter and spring, the pool is not available to any activity. The size of the outdoor pool area is 36,085 square feet (3,352.4 m^{2}). An outdoor diving area is adjacent to the outdoor pool.

=== Gymnasium 1 ===
Gymnasium 1 of the Activities and Recreation center is located on the east end of the building on the first floor. It contains five basketball courts. Alternatively, the area can also be served as seven volleyball courts. One of the basketball courts is usually used as a futsal (indoor soccer) court, with goals and dividers set up. This gymnasium is often used for intramural sports and other organized competitions. There are also day lockers in the gym area, and a locker room is attached right next to Gymnasium 1. The total area of the Gymnasium 1 is 35,780 square feet (3,324 m^{2}).

=== Gymnasium 2 ===
Gymnasium 2 of the Activities and Recreation center is located at the center of the building on the first floor. It can be also found on the left side of the building entrance, next to the member service area. The gym contains two basketball courts, which can also be served as three volleyball courts. Day lockers can be found inside the gym. The total area of the Gymnasium 2 is 14,859 square feet (1,380.4 m^{2}).

=== Gymnasium 3 ===
Gymnasium 3 of the Activities and Recreation center is located at the center of the building on the first floor. It can also be found on the right side of the building entrance, next to the member service area. The gym contains two basketball courts, which can also be served as three volleyball courts. There are usually four badminton courts set up on half the gymnasium, leaving the other half for basketball or other activities. Day lockers can be found inside the gym. The total area of the Gymnasium 3 is 15,012 square feet (1,394.7 m^{2}).

=== Gymnasium 4 ===
Gymnasium 4 of the activities and Recreation center is located at the east side of the building on the lower level. Inside Gymnasium 4 there are three basketball courts, which in turn can also be used as volleyball courts. Day lockers can be found inside the gym. The total area of the Gymnasium 4 is 19,219 square feet (1,785.5 m^{2}).

=== Multipurpose room ===
The Activities and Recreation center contains seven multipurpose room as well as one combat room. They're distributed through the first floor and the concourse level and can be used for different purposes. Common usages of these rooms are to give students lecture on dancing and to provide students clubs with space for their activities. The size of multipurpose room varies from 696 square feet (Multipurpose Room 1) to 6180 square feet (Multipurpose Room 6 and 6A). All the multipurpose rooms have day cubbies storage closets.

=== Lower Level ===
The lower level consists of mainly the weightlifting area, racquetball courts, and squash courts. The weight area features a wide selection of free weight and equipment. There is a total of 24.3 tons of weight plates, 9.5 tons of selectorized weights, and 8.3 tons of dumbbells/barbells.

=== Special areas ===
Other than the activities and exercises area mentioned above, the Activities and Recreation Center also contains several special featured areas. These include a "Clement Auditorium", a student organization room, a Group Cycling Room, an Instructional Kitchen, a Personal Training Room, a Climbing Wall, and three meeting rooms. These special areas add up to 11,186 square feet (1,039.2 m^{2}). The ARC also offers professional massages at an additional cost as well as athletic training and therapy for free, both of which are provided by external organizations.

=== Group Fitness Classes ===
Campus Recreation also runs group fitness classes for all members. There are different rates for the passes, ranging from unlimited annual passes to single-use passes. There are also a variety of class options including cardio, cycling, dance, strength, and water. To promote the classes, there are usually free classes offered the first week of each semester. Some classes use a drop-in schedule while others require reservations.

=== Special occasions ===
On special occasions, certain parts of the ARC that are usually open to all guests are reserved. Campus Recreation makes its facilities available to schools, departments, community groups, and organizations for virtually any type of event. For example, career fairs often use at least one whole gymnasium, causing those facilities to be closed for set-up the day before and used for the events the following days. Although career fairs are usually hosted by certain colleges within the university, such as the College of Business and College of Engineering, all University of Illinois students are allowed to attend them. Other community events such as the Christie Clinic Illinois Marathon also reserve a gymnasium for participants to collect race information and materials.

The ARC also hosts a Block Party once a year during welcome week during the fall. Many organizations across campus and town sponsor the event, giving out free T-shirts and pizza while coordinating many games, music, and contests.

=== Campus Recreation Usage ===
The ARC is one of the most visited locations on the University of Illinois campus. Campus Recreation, which runs facilities such as the ARC, Campus Recreation Center East (CRCE), the Ice Area, and Illini Grove, offers its facilities to over 42,000 students, and 3,200 faculty/staff members. In 2014-2015 academic year, 89% of Illinois students used Campus Recreation facilities or programs, 29,957 students participated in intramurals, and 432 personal training clients attended 3,360 fitness sessions.

== Awards ==
- 2010 Outstanding Sports Facility Award from the National Intramural Recreational Sports Association
