= Illinois Men's Volleyball Club =

Student organization at the University of Illinois

- Founded: 1984
- University: University of Illinois at Urbana-Champaign
- Conference: Big Ten
- Location: Champaign, Illinois
- Nickname: Fighting Illini
- Colors: Orange and Blue

Conference tournament champion
- 1994, 1998, 1999, 2001, 2006, 2007, 2008, 2009, 2010, 2011, 2012, 2013, 2016

The Illinois Men's Volleyball Club is a registered student organization at the University of Illinois that plays men's volleyball. The team is designated as a club team because the University does not have a varsity men's volleyball team.

== Organization ==
The Illinois Men's Volleyball Club consists of three teams of varying competitiveness and time commitment. All three teams compete in the Big Ten Conference within the Midwest Intercollegiate Volleyball Association (MIVA), a conference within the National Collegiate Volleyball Federation (NCVF). The first team, named the 1s Team, is considered to be the best team and competes in Division I A of the NCVF and generally participates in about 12 tournaments a year, including the national tournament. The 2s Team (known as the Illinois B-team in the MIVA), considered the second-best team, competes in Division III of the NCVF and participates in about eight tournaments a year. The last team, named the 3s Team (known as the Illinois C-team in the MIVA), competes in Division III of the NCVF as well.

Tryouts for all teams are held in late August/early September for 2–3 days. The season for all three teams lasts throughout the school year starting in September and ending with nationals in April. On average, 80 students try out for the club and tryouts are open to any University of Illinois male student. Each team consists of about 15 players. Students may also attempt to join the team at other times throughout the year by attending several practices that are viewed as their tryout. The Illinois Men's Volleyball Club is organized and operated by player-elected officers that are chosen at the end of each season. The current officer positions are President, Vice President, Secretary, and Treasurer.

The club does not have coaches, instead each team is led by a player-captain selected by their peers. The club is supported by member dues, University RSO funding, as well as fundraising events such as a T-shirt sale. The designation as an RSO not only allows the club to receive university funds, but also use university buildings for practice, and be officially associated with the university.

== Past standings and results ==
The Illinois Men's Volleyball Club has placed in the top ten nationally since 1999. They have also won the Big Ten Conference ten times and have five MIVA championships. While sharing a name, the Big Ten Conference within the MIVA is not associated with the official Big Ten Conference present in NCAA athletics. The club competes in a Big Ten Conference championship tournament as well as the MIVA tournament and the national tournament at the end of the season. The Illinois Men's Volleyball Club Blue team also had two players named to the First Team All-Tournament team in 2007 and has had at least one player on the First Team All-Tournament team since 2003. The table below displays the results of the National-Intramural Recreational Sports Association/National Club Volleyball Federation tournament and the Midwestern Intercollegiate Volleyball Association tournament.

Year	National Results	Conference Results
1997	49th	-
1998	3rd	-
1999	5th	2nd
2000	5th	-
2001	3rd	-
2002	29th	-
2003	5th	3rd
2004	2nd-National Runner Up	1st
2005	3rd-Final 4	2nd
2006	3rd-Final 4	1st
2007	3rd-Final 4	1st
2008	2nd-National Runner Up	1st
2009	3rd-Final 4	1st
2010	5th-Elite 8	1st
2011	5th-Elite 8	1st
2012	3rd-Final 4	1st
2013	5th-Elite 8	1st
2014	9th-Quarter-finals	3rd
2015	9th-Quarter-finals	5th
2016	25th	1st
2017	5th	3rd
2018	25th	2nd
2019	2nd	2nd
2022		1st
2023	2nd	1st
