= Clinton Lake (Illinois) =

Reservoir near Clinton, Illinois, US

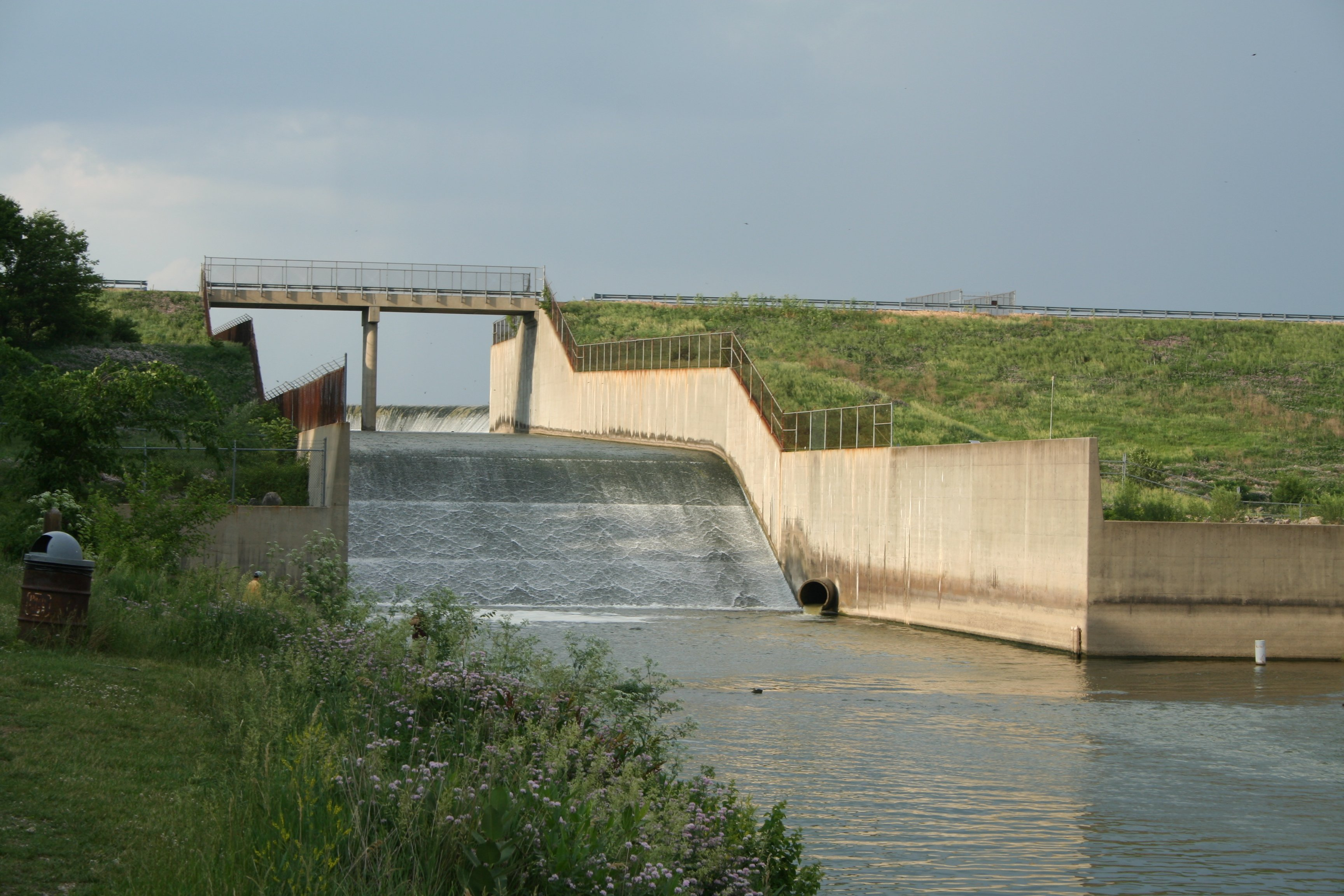
- Clinton Lake dam spillway

- Location within Illinois Location within the United States
- Location: DeWitt County, Illinois
- Coordinates: 40°08′20″N 88°52′35″W
- Type: Reservoir
- Primary inflows: Salt Creek; North Fork of Salt Creek
- Primary outflows: Salt Creek
- Basin countries: United States
- Surface area: 4,900 acres (19.8 km^{2})
- Average depth: 19.5 ft (5.9 m)
- Max. depth: 48 ft (14.6 m)
- Residence time: 6 months
- Shore length^{1}: 219 km (136.1 mi)
- Surface elevation: 690 ft (210.3 m)
- Settlements: Clinton
- ^{1} Shore length is not a well-defined measure.

Clinton Lake is a 4,900 acres (19.8 km^{2}) reservoir located near Clinton, Illinois. The lake is a part of the Clinton Lake State Recreation Area, which encompasses 9,300 acres (37.6 km^{2}). It was built in the 1970s as a cooling source for the Clinton Nuclear Generating Station. The lake opened in 1978.

Boating power is unrestricted on the main body of the lake; the upper arm of the lake is reserved as a no-wake area, and some limited areas are reserved for electric trolling motors. There are six boat launches on the lake, as well as one canoe launch. There is also a 1,000 ft (300 m) long sand beach on the lake which is open from Memorial Day to Labor Day; the beach includes a swimming area which is buoyed off from the rest of the lake. Clinton Lake is a good lake for catfish and other game fish. Other activities at Clinton Lake include camping, boating, swimming, water skiing, hiking trails, picnicking, hunting, and winter sports.

The various access and public use areas around Clinton Lake are collectively known as Clinton Lake State Recreation Area. Although fishing and other water sport activities have been the predominant attraction at this site, a variety of other recreational activities are provided as well. Hunting (by permit only), camping, picnicking, hiking and cross country ski facilities are also available. Snowmobiling is allowed if conditions are favorable. Horse owners may also make use of an equestrian trail.

Clinton Lake is less than a 4-hour drive from Chicago and St. Louis. It is approximately 30 miles from, and centrally located between, the cities of Champaign, Bloomington, Decatur and Lincoln. Access from the north or south is facilitated by Interstates 57 and 55 as well as U.S. 51, which passes within 10 miles of the lake. Interstates 72 and 74 provide access from the east or west. Illinois Route 10, 54 and 48 provide a direct route to the lake.

The sport fish community of Clinton Lake is composed of fishes common to central Illinois reservoirs: largemouth bass, bluegill, white crappie, black crappie, channel catfish, bullheads, flathead catfish, walleye, striped bass, and hybrid striped bass.

The Marina is located on the south shoreline of the Salt Creek area of Clinton Lake, between the towns of Lane and Weldon, and is accessible from Illinois Route 10 or DeWitt County Highway 14.

The Clinton Lake Sailing Association conducts sailing instruction and events from their facility near the marina.

The University of Illinois's Rowing Team practices and hosts races on Clinton Lake. In 2016, they built the Clinton Lake Rowing Center at the north-eastern tip of the lake near Farmer City. During the spring they have a six-lane race course set up on the lake.
