= Atkins Tennis Center =

Sports venue in Urbana, Illinois

- Interactive map of Atkins Tennis Center
- Location: 1800 S Wright St, Urbana, IL 61802
- Owner: University of Illinois
- Capacity: 3,800
- Surface: Hardcourt
- Public transit: Champaign-Urbana MTD

Construction
- Opened: November 2, 1991
- Renovated: 2009
- Architect: Kenneth L. Nelson

Tenants
- Illinois Fighting Illini men's tennis (1991-present); Illinois Fighting Illini women's tennis (1991-present); JSM Challenger of Champaign–Urbana (2002-Present); 2013 NCAA Division I Tennis Championships

Opened in 1991 at a cost of $5.3 million, the Atkins Tennis Center is home to both men and women's tennis at the University of Illinois at Urbana-Champaign. The tennis center features six indoor courts and twenty outdoor courts. Additionally, the complex has a pro shop and court times for general public use. It also hosts elite junior tournaments and one of the longest running professional tournaments on the USTA Pro Circuit: the JSM Challenger. The facility includes the Khan Outdoor Tennis Complex.

== 2013 ==
The 2013 NCAA Division I Women's and Men's Tennis Championships was hosted by the Atkins Tennis Center. This was the first time since 2005 (when there was a combined men and women's championship) that a Midwest school hosted the NCAA Tournament.
