= 2026 NCAA Division I Women's Tennis Championships =

- Date: November 18–23, 2025; May 1–17, 2026
- Edition: 44th
- Location: Orlando, Florida (Fall 2025); Athens, Georgia (Spring 2026)
- Venue: USTA National Campus; Hosted by: UCF (Fall 2025); Dan Magill Tennis Complex; Hosted by: University of Georgia (Spring 2026)

Champions

Women's singles
- Reese Brantmeier (North Carolina) (Fall 2025)

Women's doubles
- Gabbi Broadfoot and Tori Osuigwe (NC State) (Fall 2025)

Women's team
- Texas A&M (Spring 2026)
- NCAA Division I Women's Tennis Championships

The 2026 NCAA Division I Women's Tennis Championships were the women's tennis tournaments, the women's singles and doubles tournament was played in the fall from November 18 to November 23, 2025, in Orlando, Florida at the USTA National Campus. The women's team tournament was played in the spring from May 1 to May 17, 2026, at campus sites and Athens, Georgia at the Dan Magill Tennis Complex hosted by University of Georgia. It was the 44th edition of the NCAA Division I Women's Tennis Championship. As part of a two-year pilot program, the women's singles and doubles championships were conducted in the fall of 2025, while the team championships were played in the spring of 2026.

== Women's team championship ==
There were 64 teams selected for the women's team championship, 30 of which were automatic qualifiers from each Division 1 conference. The remaining 34 teams were selected at-large. Teams played two rounds of single-elimination matches in groups of four on May 1–2 or May 2–3 at campus sites; the winners of those regionals advanced to a super-regional round on May 9 or 10, also held at campus sites. The remaining eight teams advanced to the championship rounds in Athens, Georgia on May 15–17.

=== Automatic qualifiers ===
The following 30 teams were automatic qualifiers, representing their conferences:

| Conference | Team |
|---|---|
| American | Rice |
| Atlantic 10 | VCU |
| ACC | NC State |
| ASUN | North Florida |
| Big East | Xavier |
| Big Sky | Sacramento State |
| Big South | Charleston Southern |
| Big Ten | Michigan |
| Big 12 | TCU |
| Big West | UC Santa Barbara |
| CAA | Elon |
| CUSA | Liberty |
| Horizon | Youngstown State |
| Ivy | Yale |
| MAAC | Quinnipiac |
| MAC | Toledo |
| MEAC | Morgan State |
| Missouri Valley | Illinois State |
| Mountain West | San Diego State |
| Northeast | Saint Francis |
| Ohio Valley | Bryant |
| Patriot | Navy |
| SEC | Auburn |
| Southern | East Tennessee State |
| Southland | Stephen F. Austin |
| SWAC | Alabama State |
| Summit | Denver |
| Sun Belt | Old Dominion |
| West Coast | Pepperdine |
| WAC | Tarleton State |

=== National seeds ===
Sixteen teams were selected as national seeds, and were guaranteed to host for the first two rounds, if they submitted a bid and met criteria.

1. Georgia (semifinals)
2. Auburn (runner-up)
3. Ohio State (semifinals)
4. Texas A&M (National Champions)
5. North Carolina (quarterfinals)
6. Oklahoma (super regionals)
7. Virginia (super regionals)
8. NC State (quarterfinals)
9. Texas (super regionals)
10. LSU (quarterfinals)
11. Pepperdine (quarterfinals)
12. Michigan (super regionals)
13. USC (super regionals)
14. Vanderbilt (super regionals)
15. Duke (super regionals)
16. Arizona State (second round)

=== Bracket ===
Bold indicates winner. Host institutions for the first two rounds and Super Regionals are marked with an asterisk (*).

**First Round**; May 1–2 or 2-3, 2026; Campus sites
1 | **Georgia*** | **4**
Alabama State | 0
Athens, Georgia
Elon | 0
**Charlotte** | **4**
**UCLA** | **4**
San Diego State | 3
Tempe, Arizona
Denver | 0
16 | **Arizona State*** | **4**
9 | **Texas*** | **5**
Tarleton State | 1
Austin, Texas
Yale | 1
**Texas Tech** | **4**
**UCF** | **4**
Navy | 1
Raleigh, North Carolina
Morgan State | 0
8 | **NC State*** | **5**
5 | **North Carolina*** | **4**
Charleston Southern | 0
Chapel Hill, North Carolina
Maryland | 0
**South Carolina** | **4**
**Florida** | **4**
Toledo | 0
Ann Arbor, Michigan
Illinois State | 0
12 | **Michigan*** | **5**
13 | **USC*** | **4**
Sacramento State | 0
Los Angeles, California
Utah | 1
**California** | **4**
Wisconsin | 3
**Baylor** | **4**
College Station, Texas
Quinnipiac | 0
4 | **Texas A&M*** | **4**
3 | **Ohio State*** | **4**
Youngstown State | 0
Columbus, Ohio
**Notre Dame** | **4**
Arizona | 3
**Clemson** | **4**
ETSU | 1
Nashville, Tennessee
Xavier | 0
14 | **Vanderbilt*** | **4**
11 | **Pepperdine*** | **4**
UC Santa Barbara | 0
Malibu, California
BYU | 2
**Stanford** | **4**
**SMU** | **4**
Wichita State | 1
Norman, Oklahoma
Kansas | 0
6 | **Oklahoma*** | **4**
7 | **Virginia*** | **4**
Saint Francis | 0
Charlottesville, Virginia
Liberty | 0
**Washington** | **4**
TCU | 2
**Rice** | **4**
Baton Rouge, Louisiana
Stephen F. Austin | 0
10 | **LSU*** | **4**
15 | **Duke*** | **4**
VCU | 0
Durham, North Carolina
Old Dominion | 2
**Tennessee** | **4**
**Miami (FL)** | **4**
North Florida | 0
Auburn, Alabama
Bryant | 0
2 | **Auburn*** | **4**

**Second Round**; May 1–2 or 2-3, 2026; Campus sites
1 | **Georgia** | **4**
Charlotte | 0
**UCLA** | **4**
16 | Arizona State | 3
9 | **Texas** | **4**
Texas Tech | 2
UCF | 0
8 | **NC State** | **4**
5 | **North Carolina** | **4**
South Carolina | 0
Florida | 2
12 | **Michigan** | **4**
13 | **USC** | **4**
California | 1
Baylor | 1
4 | **Texas A&M** | **4**
3 | **Ohio State** | **4**
Notre Dame | 0
Clemson | 1
14 | **Vanderbilt** | **4**
11 | **Pepperdine** | **4**
Stanford | 0
SMU | 2
6 | **Oklahoma** | **4**
7 | **Virginia** | **4**
Washington | 0
Rice | 1
10 | **LSU** | 4
15 | **Duke** | **4**
Tennessee | 1
Miami (FL) | 0
2 | **Auburn** | **4**

**Super Regionals**; May 8 or 9, 2026; Campus sites
1 | **Georgia*** | **4**
UCLA | 1
9 | Texas | 2
8 | **NC State*** | **4**
5 | **North Carolina*** | **4**
12 | Michigan | 2
13 | USC | 1
4 | **Texas A&M*** | **5**
3 | **Ohio State*** | **4**
14 | Vanderbilt | 1
11 | **Pepperdine** | **4**
6 | Oklahoma* | 3
7 | Virginia* | 1
10 | **LSU** | **4**
15 | Duke | 2
2 | **Auburn*** | **4**

**Quarterfinals**; May 15, 2026; Athens
1 | **Georgia** | **4**
8 | NC State | 1
5 | North Carolina | 3
4 | **Texas A&M** | **4**
3 | **Ohio State** | **4**
11 | Pepperdine | 0
10 | LSU | 1
2 | **Auburn** | **4**

**Semifinals**; May 16, 2026; Athens
1 | Georgia | 3
4 | **Texas A&M** | **4**
3 | Ohio State | 1
2 | **Auburn** | **4**

**Championship**; May 17, 2026; Athens
4 | **Texas A&M** | **4**
2 | Auburn | 1

Bracket source:

== Women's singles championship ==
There were 64 singles players that qualified for the women's singles championship, via competition in approved ITA qualifying pathway events. The tournament was played in the Fall of 2025 from November 18 to 23 in Orlando, Florida.

North Carolina senior Reese Brantmeier won the women's singles title against California senior Berta Passola Folch 6–3, 6–3.

=== National seeds ===
The following sixteen players were seeded for this tournament:

1. Valerie Glozman (Stanford)
2. Carmen Andreea Herea (Texas)
3. Piper Charney (Michigan)
4. Savannah Dada-Mascoll (Appalachian State)
5. Aysegul Mert (Georgia)
6. Anastasiia Grechkina (Pepperdine)
7. Teah Chavez (Ohio State)
8. Ashton Bowers (Auburn)

Players ranked 9th–16th, listed by last name

- Reese Brantmeier (North Carolina) (National Champion)
- Tatum Evans (North Carolina)
- Anastasiia Gureva (Georgia)
- Gabia Paskauskas (Florida)
- Luciana Perry (Ohio State)
- Annabelle Xu (Virginia)
- Vivian Yang (Virginia)
- Mia Yamakita (Vanderbilt)

=== Draw ===
Bracket:

==== Finals ====
Quarterfinals
Berta Passola Folch (California) | 7 | 6
Kyoka Kubo (Kansas) | 5 | 2
4 | Savannah Dada-Mascoll (App State) | 6 | 3 | 5
Emily Welker (Ole Miss) | 4 | 6 | 7
Jana Hossam Salah (USC) | 3 | 7 | 6
Carolina Gomez Alonso (Arkansas) | 6 | 5 | 0
9-16 | Reese Brantmeier (North Carolina) | 7^{8} | 6
2 | Carmen Andreea Herea (Texas) | 6 | 0

Semifinals
Berta Passola Folch (California) | 6 | 4 | 7^{7}
Emily Welker (Ole Miss) | 2 | 6 | 6
Jana Hossam Salah (USC) | 3 | 7 | 2
9-16 | Reese Brantmeier (North Carolina) | 6 | 5 | 6

Final
Berta Passola Folch (California) | 3 | 3
9-16 | Reese Brantmeier (North Carolina) | 6 | 6

==== Section 1 ====
First round
1 | Valerie Glozman (Stanford) | 3 | 7^{1} | 4
Na Dong (Baylor) | 6 | 6 | 6
Julia Garcia Ruiz (Oklahoma) | 6 | 4
Gabriella Broadfoot (NC State) | 7^{5} | 6
9–16 | Tatum Evans (North Carolina) | 6 | 3
Mia Kupres (Texas A&M) | 7^{2} | 6
Mayu Crossley (UCLA) | 1 | 1
Berta Passola Folch (California) | 6 | 6
8 | Ashton Bowers (Auburn) | 4 | 4
Reece Carter (Washington) | 6 | 6
Irina Balus (Duke) | 6 | 6
Eugenia Zozaya Menendez (USC) | 4 | 3
9–16 | Mia Yamakita (Vanderbilt) | 6 | 6
Darya Schwartzman (Rice) | 2 | 3
Kyoka Kubo (Kansas) | 6 | 4 | 6
Kristina Paskauskas (Alabama) | 1 | 6 | 2

Second round
N Dong (Baylor) | 3 | 5
G Broadfoot (NC State) | 6 | 7
M Kupres (Texas A&M) | 3 | 2
B Passola Folch (California) | 6 | 6
R Carter (Washington) | 4 | 6 | 1
I Balus (Duke) | 6 | 4 | 6
9-16 | M Yamakita (Vanderbilt) | 6 | 6 | 3
K Kubo (Kansas) | 2 | 7^{5} | 6

Third round
G Broadfoot (NC State) | 4 | 3
B Passola Folch (California) | 6 | 6
I Balus (Duke) | 4 | 1
K Kubo (Kansas) | 6 | 6

Quarterfinals
B Passola Folch (California) | 7 | 6
K Kubo (Kansas) | 5 | 2

==== Section 2 ====
First round
4 | Savannah Dada-Mascoll (App State) | 6 | 6
Naomi Xu (California) | 3 | 3
Ria Bhakta (Clemson) | 7 | 6
Xinyi Nong (Florida) | 5 | 4
9-16 | Anastasiia Gureva (Georgia) | 6 | 7^{4}
Bianca Molnar (Notre Dame) | 4 | 6
Emma Charney (USC) | 3 | 7 | 6
Alice Ferlito (Princeton) | 6 | 5 | 4
7 | Teah Chavez (Ohio State) | 4 | 3
Valeria Ray (Vanderbilt) | 6 | 6
Lavinia Tanasie (NC State) | 2 | 1
Emily Welker (Ole Miss) | 6 | 6
9-16 | Annabelle Xu (Virginia) | 3 | 6 | 3
Stephanie Yakoff (Harvard) | 6 | 3 | 6
Theadora Rabman (North Carolina) | 4 | 6 | 3
Lily Jones (Michigan) | 6 | 3 | 6

Second round
4 | S Dada-Mascoll (App State) | 6 | 6
Ria Bhakta (Clemson) | 3 | 0
9-16 | A Gureva (Georgia) | 3 | 5
E Charney (USC) | 6 | 7
V Ray (Vanderbilt) | 6 | 0 | 3
E Welker (Ole Miss) | 2 | 6 | 6
S Yakoff (Harvard) | 6 | 4 | 6
L Jones (Michigan) | 2 | 6 | 7^{6}

Third round
4 | S Dada-Mascoll (App State) | 6 | 4 | 6
E Charney (USC) | 4 | 6 | 3
E Welker (Ole Miss) | w/o inj
L Jones (Michigan) | ret.

Quarterfinals
4 | S Dada-Mascoll (App State) | 6 | 3 | 5
E Welker (Ole Miss) | 4 | 6 | 7

==== Section 3 ====
First round
Nao Nishino (Ohio State) | 2 | 2
Mia Slama (NC State) | 6 | 6
Alyssa Ahn (Stanford) | 2 | 6 | 5
9-16 | Gabia Paskauskas (Florida) | 6 | 4 | 7
Jana Hossam Salah (USC) | 6 | 6
Greta Greco Lucchina (California) | 3 | 1
Ange Oby Kajuru (North Carolina) | 6 | 4 | 6
5 | Aysegul Mert (Georgia) | 4 | 6 | 4
Serafima Shastova (Syracuse) | 2 | 6
Erika Matsuda (Washington) | 6 | 7^{3}
Carolina Gomez Alonso (Arkansas) | 1 | 6 | 6
9-16 | Vivian Yang (Virginia) | 6 | 2 | 2
Zuzanna Kubacha (Baylor) | 7 | 6
Liv Hovde (Duke) | 5 | 4
Emma Kamper (Utah) | 5 | 2
3 | Piper Charney (Michigan) | 7 | 6

Second round
M Slama (NC State) | 6 | 6
9-16 | G Paskauskas (Florida) | 3 | 1
J Hossam Salah (USC) | 6 | 6
A O Kajuru (Michigan) | 3 | 2
E Matsuda (Washington) | 4 | 0
C Gomez Alonso (Arkansas) | 6 | 6
Z Kubacha (Baylor) | 4 | 6
3 | P Charney (Michigan) | 6 | 7^{5}

Third round
M Slama (NC State) | 4 | 0
J Hossam Salah (USC) | 6 | 6
C Gomez Alonso (Arkansas) | 6 | 6
3 | P Charney (Michigan) | 2 | 2

Quarterfinals
J Hossam Salah (USC) | 3 | 7 | 6
C Gomez Alonso (Arkansas) | 6 | 5 | 0

==== Section 4 ====
First round
Violeta Martinez (Texas A&M) | 6 | 2 | 1
Sophie Llewellyn (SMU) | 4 | 6 | 6
Bridget Stammel (Vanderbilt) | 1 | 6 | 5
9-16 | Reese Brantmeier (North Carolina) | 6 | 4 | 7
Krisha Mahendran (USC) | 6 | 2 | 6
Ava Esposito (Auburn) | 4 | 6 | 7^{3}
Anastasiia Lopata (Georgia) | 3 | 7 | 3
6 | Anastasiia Grechkina (Pepperdine) | 6 | 5 | 6
Mao Mushika (California) | 6 | 7^{3} | 5
Ni Xi (Charlotte) | 7^{2} | 6 | 7
Esha Velaga (Penn) | 6 | 1 | 2
9-16 | Luciana Perry (Ohio State) | 4 | 6 | 6
Louise Wikander (Denver) | 4 | 3
Eva Shaw (Florida State) | 6 | 6
Anna Zyryanova (NC State) | 1 | 4
2 | Carmen Andreea Herea (Texas) | 6 | 6

Second round
S Llewellyn (SMU) | 2 | 6 | 2
9-16 | R Brantmeier (North Carolina) | 6 | 4 | 6
A Esposito (Auburn) | 6 | 6
6 | A Grechkina (Pepperdine) | 4 | 3
N Xi (Charlotte) | 0 | 6 | 1
9-16 | L Perry (Ohio State) | 6 | 1 | 6
E Shaw (Florida State) | 3 | 5
2 | C A Herea (Texas) | 6 | 7

Third round
9-16 | R Brantmeier (North Carolina) | 6 | 3 | 6
A Esposito (Auburn) | 2 | 6 | 1
9-16 | L Perry (Ohio State) | 6 | 3 | 2
2 | C A Herea (Texas) | 4 | 6 | 6

Quarterfinals
9-16 | R Brantmeier (North Carolina) | 7^{8} | 6
2 | C A Herea (Texas) | 6 | 0

== Women's doubles championship ==
32 doubles teams qualified for the women's doubles championship, via competition in approved ITA qualifying pathway events. The tournament was played was played at the same time as the singles championship in the Fall of 2025 from November 18 to 23 in Orlando, Florida.

Gabbi Broadfoot and Tori Osuigwe of NC State beat Celia-Belle Mohr and Sophia Webster of Vanderbilt, to win the women's double title.

=== National seeds ===
The following eight teams were seeded for this tournament:

1. Maria Sholokhova / Lucie Urbanova (Wisconsin)
2. Roisin Gilheany / Gloriana Nahum (Oklahoma)
3. Ange Oby Kajuru / Susanna Maltby (North Carolina)
4. Sophia Webster / Celia-Belle Mohr (Vanderbilt)

Players ranked 5th–8th, listed by institution

- Bojana Pozder / Bianca Molnar (Notre Dame)
- Jo-Yee Chan / Vessa Turley (San Diego State)
- Annabelle Xu / Martina Genis Salas (Virginia)
- Melodie Collard / Vivian Yang (Virginia)

=== Draw ===
Bracket:

==== Finals ====
Semifinals
Lily Fairclough (USC); Daniela Borruel (USC) | 4 | 7^{5} | 3
Victoria Osuigwe (NC State); Gabriella Broadfoot (NC State) | 6 | 6 | [10]
4 | Sophia Webster (Vanderbilt); Celia-Belle Mohr (Vanderbilt) | 6 | 6
2 | Roisin Gilheany (Oklahoma); Gloriana Nahum (Oklahoma) | 3 | 2

Final
Victoria Osuigwe (NC State); Gabriella Broadfoot (NC State) | 7 | 6
4 | Sophia Webster (Vanderbilt); Celia-Belle Mohr (Vanderbilt) | 5 | 4

==== Top half ====
First round
1 | Maria Sholokhova (Wisconsin); Lucie Urbanova (Wisconsin) | 6 | 6 | 4
Charlotte Kempenaers-Pocz (Mississippi State); Gianna Oboniye (Mississippi State) | 4 | 7^{2} | [10]
Leena Friedman (Yale); Orly Ogilvy (Yale) | 3 | 6 | [10]
Erika Matsuda (Washington); Carina Syrtveit (Washington) | 6 | 3 | 4
5-8 | Bojana Pozder (Notre Dame); Bianca Molnar (Notre Dame) | 5 | 6 | 6
Stanislava Shulzhenko (Iowa State); Maria de la Paz Alberto (Iowa State) | 7 | 4 | [10]
Lily Fairclough (USC); Daniela Borruel (USC) | 3 | 6 | [10]
Hailey Murphy (Texas Tech); Yekaterina Dmitrichenko (Texas Tech) | 6 | 2 | 7
3 | Ange Oby Kajuru (North Carolina); Susanna Maltby (North Carolina) | 6 | 6
Emma Dong (Georgia); Deniz Dilek (Georgia) | 3 | 0
Na Dong (Baylor); Zuzanna Kubacha (Baylor) | 4 | 3
Andrea Nova (Ole Miss); Emily Welker (Ole Miss) | 6 | 6
5-8 | Melodie Collard (Virginia); Vivian Yang (Virginia) | 6 | 6
Xinyi Nong (Florida); Nikola Daubnerova (Florida) | 4 | 3
Daria Smetannikov (Texas A&M); Mia Kupres (Texas A&M) | 2 | 2
Victoria Osuigwe (NC State); Gabriella Broadfoot (NC State) | 6 | 6

Second round
C Kempenaers-Pocz (Mississippi State); G Oboniye (Mississippi State) | 4 | 6 | 6
L Friedman (Yale); O Ogilvy (Yale) | 6 | 3 | [10]
S Shulzhenko (Iowa State); M de la Paz Alberto (Iowa State) | 6 | 6
L Fairclough (USC); D Borruel (USC) | 7^{2} | 7^{5}
3 | A O Kajuru (North Carolina); S Maltby (North Carolina) | 7 | 4 | [10]
A Nova (Ole Miss); E Welker (Ole Miss) | 5 | 6 | 5
5-8 | M Collard (Virginia); V Yang (Virginia) | 4 | 4
V Osuigwe (NC State); G Broadfoot (NC State) | 6 | 6

Quarterfinals
L Friedman (Yale); O Ogilvy (Yale) | 1 | 4
L Fairclough (USC); D Borruel (USC) | 6 | 6
3 | A O Kajuru (North Carolina); S Maltby (North Carolina) | 7 | 1 | [10]
V Osuigwe (NC State); G Broadfoot (NC State) | 5 | 6 | [12]

Semifinals
L Fairclough (USC); D Borruel (USC) | 4 | 7^{5} | 3
V Osuigwe (NC State); G Broadfoot (NC State) | 6 | 6 | [10]

==== Bottom half ====
First round
Aysegul Mert (Georgia); Anastasiia Gureva (Georgia) | 3 | 0
Krisha Mahendran (USC); Jana Hossam Salah (USC) | 6 | 6
Nevena Kolarevic (Fordham); Julianne Nguyen (Fordham) | 4 | 4
5-8 | Annabelle Xu (Virginia); Martina Genis Salas (Virginia) | 6 | 6
Elle Warren (Furman); Lillie Murphy (Furman) | 6 | 4 | 3
Liv Hovde (Duke); Shavit Kimchi (Duke) | 3 | 6 | [10]
Mao Mushika (California); Greta Greco Lucchina (California) | 6 | 4 | 5
4 | Sophia Webster (Vanderbilt); Celia-Belle Mohr (Vanderbilt) | 4 | 6 | [10]
Anna-Marie Weissheim (Washington); Alexia Jacobs (Washington) | 6 | 3 | 6
Reese Brantmeier (North Carolina); Alanis Hamilton (North Carolina) | 1 | 6 | [10]
Grace Levelston (BYU); Kendall Kovick (BYU) | 6 | 6
5-8 | Jo-Yee Chan (San DIego State); Vessa Turley (San DIego State) | 1 | 1
Jasmine Conway (NC State); Anna Zyryanova (NC State) | 6 | 7^{5} | 7
Anet Koskel (Arkansas); Carolina Gomez Alonso (Arkansas) | 6 | 6 | [10]
Ema Kovacevic (Maryland); Emma Ghirardato (Maryland) | 4 | 2
2 | Roisin Gilheany (Oklahoma); Gloriana Nahum (Oklahoma) | 6 | 6

Second round
K Mahendran (USC); J Hossam Salah (USC) | 3 | 6 | 4
5-8 | A Xu (Virginia); M Genis Salas (Virginia) | 6 | 2 | [10]
L Hovde (Duke); S Kimchi (Duke) | 6 | 3 | 8
4 | S Webster (Vanderbilt); C-B Mohr (Vanderbilt) | 1 | 6 | [10]
R Brantmeier (North Carolina); A Hamilton (North Carolina) | 6 | 7^{6}
G Levelston (BYU); K Kovick (BYU) | 3 | 6
A Koskel (Arkansas); C Gomez Alonso (Arkansas) | 0 | 3
2 | R Gilheany (Oklahoma); G Nahum (Oklahoma) | 6 | 6

Quarterfinals
5-8 | A Xu (Virginia); M Genis Salas (Virginia) | 0 | 4
4 | S Webster (Vanderbilt); C-B Mohr (Vanderbilt) | 6 | 6
R Brantmeier (North Carolina); A Hamilton (North Carolina) | 3 | 6 | 5
2 | R Gilheany (Oklahoma); G Nahum (Oklahoma) | 6 | 4 | [10]

Semifinals
4 | S Webster (Vanderbilt); C-B Mohr (Vanderbilt) | 6 | 6
2 | R Gilheany (Oklahoma); G Nahum (Oklahoma) | 3 | 2
