= Texas A&M Aggies women's tennis =

Texas A&M Womens Tennis Team

Texas A&M Aggies Women's Tennis
- Founded: 1980
- University: Texas A&M University
- Athletic director: Trev Alberts
- Head coach: Mark Weaver (10th season)
- Conference: SEC
- Location: College Station, Texas, US
- Home Court: Mitchell Tennis Center
- Nickname: Aggies
- Colors: Maroon and White

NCAA Tournament championships
- 2024, 2026

NCAA Tournament runner-up
- 2013, 2025

NCAA Tournament Semifinals
- 2013, 2024, 2025, 2026

NCAA Tournament Quarterfinals
- 2013, 2022, 2023, 2024, 2025, 2026

NCAA Tournament Round of 16
- 2004, 2013, 2014, 2015, 2017, 2019, 2021, 2022, 2023, 2024, 2025, 2026

NCAA Tournament Round of 32
- 1996, 1997, 1998, 2000, 2003, 2004, 2005, 2006, 2007, 2008, 2012, 2013, 2014, 2015, 2016, 2017, 2018, 2019, 2021, 2022, 2023, 2024, 2025, 2026

NCAA Tournament appearances
- 1986, 1989, 1996, 1997, 1998, 2000, 2001, 2002, 2003, 2004, 2005, 2006, 2007, 2008, 2009, 2010, 2011, 2012, 2013, 2014, 2015, 2016, 2017, 2018, 2019, 2021, 2022, 2023, 2024, 2025, 2026

Conference Tournament championships
- Big 12; 2004 SEC; 2022

Conference regular season champions
- SWC; 1986 Big 12; 2003 SEC; 2013, 2022, 2023, 2024, 2025, 2026

The Texas A&M Aggies women's tennis team represents Texas A&M University in NCAA Division I intercollegiate women's tennis competition. The Aggies compete in the Southeastern Conference (SEC).

The team began play in 1980. Since then, the Aggies have won two NCAA Championships (2024 and 2026) and were also the NCAA runner-up in 2013 and 2025.

The majority of program history has been defined by the successful tenure of Bobby Kleinecke, who as head coach from 1986 to 2011, led the team to 17 NCAA tournament appearances. Kleinecke was named SWC Coach of the Year in 1986 and 1996 and Big 12 Coach of the Year in 2003 and 2004.

The current head coach is Mark Weaver. During his tenure Weaver was named SEC Coach of the year in 2022, 2023 and 2025 and was an ITA National Coach of the year finalist in 2022.

== Head coach ==
#	Coach	Years	Seasons	Overall			Conference		
#	Coach	Years	Seasons	Won	Lost	%	Won	Lost	%
1	David Kent	1980	1	12	15	.444			
2	Jan Cannon	1981–1984	4	52	49	.515	7	9	.438
3	Jan Baldwin	1985	1	16	8	.667	4	4	.500
4	Bobby Kleinecke	1986–2011	26	421	269	.610	176	65	.730
5	Howard Joffe	2012–2015	4	83	23	.783	40	8	.833
6	Mark Weaver	2016–present	11	258	76	.772	102	36	.739
Total			47	842	440	.657	329	122	.729

== Year-by-year results ==
Legend
National champions
Conference champions
Conference Tournament Champions
Both Regular Season and Tournament Champions

Season	Coach	Conference Record	Overall Record	Notes
David Kent (TAIAW) (1980)
1980	David Kent		12–15	
Jan Cannon (TAIAW) (1981–1982)
1981	Jan Cannon		11–16	
1982	Jan Cannon		9–12	5th TAIAW/6th SWAIAW
Jan Cannon (Southwest Conference) (1983–1984)
1983	Jan Cannon	3–5	15–10	
1984	Jan Cannon	4–4	17–11	
Jan Baldwin (Southwest Conference) (1985)
1985	Jan Baldwin	4–4	16–8	
Bobby Kleinecke (Southwest Conference) (1986–1995)
1986	Bobby Kleinecke	6–2	19–8	NCAA First Round
1987	Bobby Kleinecke	3–5	9–19	
1988	Bobby Kleinecke	6–2	18–9	
1989	Bobby Kleinecke	6–2	17–11	NCAA First Round
1990	Bobby Kleinecke	6–2	12–16	
1991	Bobby Kleinecke	4–4	9–16	
1992	Bobby Kleinecke	3–4	8–14	
1993	Bobby Kleinecke	5–2	11–13	
1994	Bobby Kleinecke	5–2	15–9	
1995	Bobby Kleinecke	5–2	12–12	
1996	Bobby Kleinecke	5–2	20–6	NCAA Southwest Regional Final
Bobby Kleinecke (Big 12) (1996–2011)
1997	Bobby Kleinecke	9–2	19–6	NCAA Southwest Regional Semifinal
1998	Bobby Kleinecke	7–4	18–11	NCAA Southwest Regional
1999	Bobby Kleinecke	8–3	14–9	
2000	Bobby Kleinecke	9–2	20–6	NCAA Second Round
2001	Bobby Kleinecke	9–2	20–6	NCAA First Round
2002	Bobby Kleinecke	9–2	23–6	NCAA First Round
2003	Bobby Kleinecke	9–2	20–11	NCAA Second Round
2004	Bobby Kleinecke	10–1	24–8	NCAA Round of 16
2005	Bobby Kleinecke	8–3	16–13	NCAA Second Round
2006	Bobby Kleinecke	9–2	16–12	NCAA Second Round
2007	Bobby Kleinecke	9–2	21–7	NCAA Second Round
2008	Bobby Kleinecke	9–2	17–9	NCAA Second Round
2009	Bobby Kleinecke	9–2	14–11	NCAA First Round
2010	Bobby Kleinecke	8–3	14–10	NCAA First Round
2011	Bobby Kleinecke	7–4	15–9	NCAA First Round
Howard Joffe (Big 12) (2013–2015)
2012	Howard Joffe	7–2	19–6	NCAA Second Round
Howard Joffe (SEC) (2013–2015)
2013	Howard Joffe	12–1	26–4	NCAA Finals
2014	Howard Joffe	10–3	21–7	NCAA Round of 16
2015	Howard Joffe	11–2	17–6	NCAA Round of 16
Mark Weaver (SEC) (2016–Present)
2016	Mark Weaver	7–6	17–11	NCAA Second Round
2017	Mark Weaver	6–7	18–13	NCAA Round of 16
2018	Mark Weaver	5–8	17–11	NCAA Second Round
2019	Mark Weaver	8–5	24–8	NCAA Round of 16
2020	Mark Weaver	2–2	13–4	Cancelled due to Covid19 Pandemic
2021	Mark Weaver	9–4	20–8	NCAA Round of 16
2022	Mark Weaver	13–0	33–2	NCAA Quarterfinals
2023	Mark Weaver	13–0	30–3	NCAA Quarterfinals
2024	Mark Weaver	12–1	28–7	NCAA Champions
2025	Mark Weaver	14–1	30–4	NCAA Finals
2026	Mark Weaver	13–2	28–5	NCAA Champions

== Individual Honors ==
=== National Athletes of the Year ===
ITA Player of the Year
Year	Recipient
2024	Mary Stoiana
2026	Lucciana Pérez

Honda Sports Award
Year	Recipient
2024	Mary Stoiana
2026	Lucciana Pérez

=== National Coach of the Year ===
Year	Recipient
2026	Mark Weaver

=== Conference Athletes of the Year ===
Player of the Year
Year	Recipient	Conference
2012	Cristina Sanchez-Quintanar	Big 12
2023	Mary Stoiana	SEC
2024	Mary Stoiana	SEC
2026	Lucciana Perez	SEC

Newcomer of the Year
Year	Recipient	Conference
2004	Helga Vieira	Big 12
2006	Sarah Foster	Big 12
2012	Cristina Sanchez-Quintanar	Big 12

Freshman of the Year
Year	Recipient	Conference
1999	Martina Nedorostova	Big 12
2001	Jessica Roland	Big 12
2024	Lucciana Perez	SEC

=== Conference Coach of the Year ===
Year	Recipient	Conference
1986	Bobby Kleinecke	SWC
1996	Bobby Kleinecke	SWC
2003	Bobby Kleinecke	Big 12
2004	Bobby Kleinecke	Big 12
2022	Mark Weaver	SEC
2023	Mark Weaver	SEC
2025	Mark Weaver	SEC

== See also ==
- Texas A&M Aggies
