= San Diego State Aztecs women's tennis =

College women's tennis team

- University: San Diego State University
- Head coach: Nicolas (Nico) Vinel
- Conference: Pac-12
- Location: San Diego, California
- Home Court: Aztec Tennis Center
- Nickname: Aztecs
- Colors: Scarlet and black

NCAA Tournament appearances
- 1982, 1983, 1984, 1985, 1986, 1989, 1990, 1991, 1992, 1993, 1996, 1997, 1998, 1999, 2000, 2002, 2003, 2005, 2006, 2007, 2009, 2013, 2022, 2024

Conference Tournament championships
- Mountain West; 2003

Conference regular season champions
- Mountain West; 2002, 2003, 2013; WAC; 1991, 1992, 1997

The San Diego State Aztecs women's tennis team is the women's tennis program that represents San Diego State University (SDSU). The Aztecs compete in NCAA Division I as a member of the Pac-12 Conference. The team is based at the Aztec Tennis Center. The team's coach is Nicolas (Nico) Vinel, and assistant coach is Dylan Parsley.

== Postseason ==
Aztec women's tennis, as of 2025, has reached the NCAA Division I Women's Tennis Championship 24 times. The team has won three Mountain West Conference regular season titles as well as one Mountain West tournament title. Additionally, the team won three titles as a member of the Western Athletic Conference (all regular season, as the WAC has never sponsored a conference tournament championship in women's tennis).

Year	Round	Opponent	Result
1982	First round Quarterfinals	Northwestern; Trinity	W 8–1; L 3–6
1983	First round Quarterfinals	Miami (FL); Stanford	W 5–4; L 4–5
1984	First round Quarterfinals; Semifinals; Third-place game	Cal; Texas; Stanford; Trinity	W 7–2; W 6–3; L 2–7; L 4–5
1985	First round Quarterfinals	Northwestern; USC	W 6–3; L 0–9
1986	First round	Oklahoma State	L 3–6
1989	First round Second round	William & Mary; Stanford	W 6–3; L 0–9
1990	First round	Indiana	L 3–5
1991	First round Second round	Tennessee; Stanford	W 5–1; L 1–5
1992	First round Second round	Kansas; Duke	W 5–4; L 1–5
1993	First round	Ole Miss	L 3–5
1996	West Regional	Arizona State	L 4–5
1997	West Regional; West Regional	Oregon; Pepperdine	W 5–2; L 2–5
1998	West Regional; West Regional	San Diego; USC	W 5–2; L 1–5
1999	California Regional	Marquette	L 1–5
2000	First round Second round	South Florida; Wake Forest	W 5–0; L 0–5
2002	First round	Arizona	L 3–4
2003	First round	Fresno State	L 0–4
2005	First round	Arizona State	L 0–4
2006	First round	UCLA	L 0–4
2007	First round	Florida State	L 0–4
2009	First round	Washington	L 0–4
2013	First round	Baylor	L 1–4
2022	First round	USC	L 0–4
2024	First round	UCLA	L 0–4

== See also ==
- Aztec Hall of Fame
