= 2000 NCAA Division I women's tennis championships =

- Date: May 2000
- Edition: 19th
- Location: Malibu, California
- Venue: Ralphs-Straus Tennis Center; Pepperdine University

Champions

Women's singles
- (United States) Laura Granville (Stanford)

Women's doubles
- (United Kingdom) Claire Curran / (United States) Amy Jensen (California)

Women's team
- Georgia
← 1999 ·	NCAA Division I women's tennis championships	· 2001 →

The 2000 NCAA Division I women's tennis championships were the 19th annual championships to determine the national champions of NCAA Division I women's singles, doubles, and team collegiate tennis in the United States.

Georgia defeated defending champions Stanford in the team final, 5–4, to claim their second national title.

== Host ==
This year's tournaments were hosted by Pepperdine University at the Ralphs-Straus Tennis Center in Malibu, California. This was the Waves' second time hosting the women's championships.

The men's and women's NCAA tennis championships would not be held jointly until 2006.

== Bracket ==
=== Team ===
First round
Stanford	6
Weber State	0
Clemson	3
Fresno State	5
Northwestern	5
Oral Roberts	0
Minnesota	3
Tulsa	5
Boston University	0
UCLA	6
Georgia Tech	5
Washington	3
Texas	5
Texas–Arlington	0
Baylor	5
Indiana	1
Virginia Tech	0
Wake Forest	5
San Diego State	5
South Florida	0
Loyola Maryland	0
William & Mary	5
Princeton	1
Tennessee	5
California	6
Pacific	0
Kentucky	4
Texas A&M	5
Alcorn State	0
Vanderbilt	5
TCU	1
VCU	5
Arizona	5
New Mexico	2
USC	5
UMBC	0
Iowa	3
LSU	5
Drake	0
Pepperdine	5
Middle Tennessee	1
Ole Miss	5
Central Florida	0
South Alabama	5
Miami (FL)	3
Ohio State	5
Furman	0
Georgia	5
Mississippi State	5
Oregon	0
Arizona State	6
Army	0
Arkansas	5
North Carolina	2
Duke	5
Winthrop	0
South Carolina	5
Western Michigan	1
Illinois–Chicago	0
Notre Dame	5
Florida State	5
Illinois	3
Bethune–Cookman	0
Florida	5

Second round
Stanford	5
Fresno State	1
Northwestern	5
Tulsa	0
UCLA	6
Georgia Tech	0
Texas	5
Baylor	0
Wake Forest	5
San Diego State	0
William & Mary	3
Tennessee	5
California	5
Texas A&M	0
Vanderbilt	6
VCU	0
Arizona	2
USC	5
LSU	5
Pepperdine	4
Ole Miss	4
South Alabama	5
Ohio State	0
Georgia	5
Mississippi State	0
Arizona State	6
Arkansas	0
Duke	5
South Carolina	1
Notre Dame	5
Florida State	0
Florida	5

Third round
Stanford	5
Northwestern	1
UCLA	5
Texas	2
Wake Forest	5
Tennessee	0
California	5
Vanderbilt	1
USC	5
LSU	2
South Alabama	1
Georgia	5
Arizona State	5
Duke	2
Notre Dame	0
Florida	5

Quarterfinals
Stanford	5
UCLA	0
Wake Forest	4
California	5
USC	1
Georgia	5
Arizona State	3
Florida	5

Semifinals
Stanford	5
California	0
Georgia	5
Florida	2

Championship
Stanford	4
Georgia	5

== See also ==
- 2000 NCAA Division I men's tennis championships
- 2000 NCAA Division II women's tennis championships
- 2000 NCAA Division III women's tennis championships
- 2000 NAIA women's tennis championships
