= 2002 NCAA Division I women's tennis championships =

- Date: May 2002
- Edition: 21st
- Location: Stanford, California
- Venue: Taube Tennis Center; Stanford University

Champions

Women's singles
- (United States) Bea Bielik (Wake Forest)

Women's doubles
- (United States) Lauren Kalvaria / (United States) Gabriela Lastra (Stanford)

Women's team
- Stanford
← 2001 ·	NCAA Division I women's tennis championships	· 2003 →

The 2002 NCAA Division I women's tennis championships were the 21st annual championships hosted by the NCAA to determine the national champions of women's singles, doubles, and team collegiate tennis among its Division I member programs in the United States.

Defending champions and hosts Stanford defeated Florida in the team final, 4–1, to claim their twelfth national title (and fourth in six years).

== Host ==
This year's tournaments were hosted by Stanford University at the Taube Tennis Center in Stanford, California.

The men's and women's NCAA tennis championships would not be held concurrently at the same venue until 2006.

== Bracket ==
=== Team ===
First round
FIU	2
Miami (FL)	4
Central Florida	0
Florida	4
Illinois–Chicago	0
Northwestern	4
Notre Dame	2
Wisconsin	4
American	0
Wake Forest	4
Clemson	4
William & Mary	3
Texas	4
UTSA	0
Texas A&M	1
TCU	4
Murray State	0
Vanderbilt	5
Auburn	4
Indiana	3
Marshall	0
Tennessee	4
Alabama	4
Ohio State	0
Penn	4
Richmond	0
Duke	4
UMBC	0
Hampton	1
South Carolina	4
Florida State	0
VCU	4
Arizona	4
San Diego State	3
Arizona State	4
SW Missouri State	0
Furman	4
LSU	1
Loyola Maryland	0
North Carolina	5
Georgia Tech	4
Michigan	2
Boston University	0
Kentucky	4
Long Beach State	1
Pepperdine	4
Sacramento State	0
Stanford	4
Oregon	4
UNLV	2
Oral Roberts	0
USC	5
Loyola Marymount	0
Washington	4
Southern	0
UCLA	4
Fresno State	4
Washington State	0
BYU	0
California	4
Ole Miss	0
South Alabama	4
Georgia	4
Winthrop	0

Second round
Miami (FL)	0
Florida	4
Northwestern	4
Wisconsin	0
Wake Forest	4
Clemson	1
Texas	4
TCU	2
Vanderbilt	4
Auburn	0
Tennessee	4
Alabama	0
Penn	0
Duke	4
South Carolina	1
VCU	4
Arizona	0
Arizona State	4
Furman	0
North Carolina	4
Georgia Tech	1
Kentucky	4
Pepperdine	0
Stanford	4
Oregon	0
USC	4
Washington	1
UCLA	4
Fresno State	1
California	4
South Alabama	3
Georgia	4

Third round
Florida	4
Northwestern	1
Wake Forest	4
Texas	2
Vanderbilt	2
Tennessee	4
Duke	3
VCU	4
Arizona State	1
North Carolina	4
Kentucky	1
Stanford	5
USC	1
UCLA	5
California	1
Georgia	4

Quarterfinals
Florida	4
Wake Forest	0
Tennessee	4
VCU	3
North Carolina	1
Stanford	4
UCLA	2
Georgia	4

Semifinals
Florida	4
Tennessee	1
Stanford	4
Georgia	0

Championship
Florida	1
Stanford	4

== See also ==
- 2002 NCAA Division I men's tennis championships
- 2002 NCAA Division II women's tennis championships
- 2002 NCAA Division III women's tennis championships
- 2002 NAIA women's tennis championships
