= 2005 NCAA Division I women's tennis championships =

- Date: May 13–22, 2005
- Edition: 24th
- Location: (Georgia (U.S. state)) Athens, Georgia
- Venue: Dan Magill Tennis Complex; University of Georgia

Champions

Women's singles
- (Slovakia) Zuzana Zemenová (Baylor)

Women's doubles
- (United Kingdom) Alice Barnes / (United States) Erin Burdette (Stanford)

Women's team
- Stanford
← 2004 ·	NCAA Division I women's tennis championships	· 2006 →

The 2005 NCAA Division I Women's Tennis Championships were the 24th annual championships hosted by the NCAA to determine the national champions of women's singles, doubles, and team collegiate tennis among its Division I member programs in the United States.

Defending champions Stanford defeated Texas in the team final, 4–0, to claim their fourteenth national title, the Cardinal's sixth title in nine years.

== Host ==
This year's tournaments were hosted by the University of Georgia at the Dan Magill Tennis Complex in Athens, Georgia.

These were the final standalone women's Division I NCAA tournaments before they were held concurrently at the same venue as the men's championships for the first time in 2006.

== Brackets ==
=== Team ===
First round May 13–14, 2005
1	Stanford	4
Army	0
Stanford, CA
Oregon	4
Fresno State	2
16	Tennessee	4
Boston University	0
Cambridge, MA
Harvard	4
Maryland	0
8	Georgia	4
Quinnipiac	0
Athens, GA
South Carolina	4
Nebraska	0
9	Miami (FL)	4
Florida Atlantic	0
Coral Gables, FL
California	4
Ole Miss	3
4	Vanderbilt	5
UT Martin	0
Nashville, TN
South Alabama	4
Alabama	2
13	North Carolina	4
Richmond	0
Chapel Hill, NC
Duke	4
Michigan	1
5	Northwestern	4
Valparaiso	0
Evanston, IL
Notre Dame	4
Iowa	1
12	Clemson	4
Furman	0
Clemson, SC
William & Mary	4
Wisconsin	1
11	Texas	4
Southern	0
Austin, TX
UNLV	0
Texas A&M	4
6	Georgia Tech	4
Winthrop	0
Atlanta, GA
Pepperdine	4
Mississippi State	1
14	Tulane	4
SE Louisiana	0
New Orleans, LA
LSU	1
TCU	4
3	Kentucky	4
Marshall	0
Lexington, KY
Indiana	3
Wake Forest	4
10	UCLA	4
Illinois State	0
Los Angeles, CA
Long Beach State	0
Washington	4
7	USC	4
Illinois–Chicago	0
Los Angeles, CA
San Diego State	0
Arizona State	4
15	Baylor	4
Niagara	0
Provo, UT
Sacramento State	1
BYU	4
2	Florida	4
South Carolina State	0
Gainesville, FL
Florida State	2
FIU	4

Second round May 13–14, 2005
1	Stanford	4
Oregon	0
16	Tennessee	1
Harvard	4
8	Georgia	4
South Carolina	0
9	Miami (FL)	3
California	4
4	Vanderbilt	4
South Alabama	0
13	North Carolina	4
Duke	0
5	Northwestern	4
Notre Dame	0
12	Clemson	4
William & Mary	0
11	Texas	4
Texas A&M	1
6	Georgia Tech	4
Pepperdine	0
14	Tulane	4
TCU	3
3	Kentucky	4
Wake Forest	2
10	UCLA	4
Washington	0
7	USC	4
Arizona State	0
15	Baylor	4
BYU	1
2	Florida	4
FIU	0

Third round May 19, 2005
1	Stanford	4
Harvard	0
8	Georgia	4
California	2
4	Vanderbilt	0
13	North Carolina	4
5	Northwestern	3
12	Clemson	4
11	Texas	4
6	Georgia Tech	3
14	Tulane	1
3	Kentucky	4
10	UCLA	3
7	USC	4
15	Baylor	2
2	Florida	4

Quarterfinals; May 20, 2005
1	Stanford	4
8	Georgia	1
13	North Carolina	1
12	Clemson	4
11	Texas	4
3	Kentucky	2
7	USC	2
2	Florida	4

Semifinals; May 21, 2005
1	Stanford	4
12	Clemson	2
11	Texas	4
2	Florida	3

Championship; May 22, 2005
1	Stanford	4
11	Texas	0

== See also ==
- 2005 NCAA Division I men's tennis championships
- 2005 NCAA Division II women's tennis championships
- 2005 NCAA Division III women's tennis championships
- 2005 NAIA women's tennis championships
