= 2003 NCAA Division I women's tennis championships =

- Date: May 2003
- Edition: 22nd
- Location: Gainesville, Florida
- Venue: Ring Tennis Complex; University of Florida

Champions

Women's singles
- (United States) Amber Liu (Stanford)

Women's doubles
- (United States) Christina Fusano / (United States) Raquel Kops-Jones (California)

Women's team
- Florida
| ← 2002 · | NCAA Division I women's tennis championships | · 2004 → |

The 2003 NCAA Division I women's tennis championships were the 22nd annual championships hosted by the NCAA to determine the national champions of women's singles, doubles, and team collegiate tennis among its Division I member programs in the United States.

Hosts Florida defeated two-time defending champions Stanford in the team final, 4–3, to claim their fourth national title.

== Host ==
This year's tournaments were hosted by the University of Florida at the Ring Tennis Complex in Gainesville, Florida.

The men's and women's NCAA tennis championships would not be held jointly until 2006.

== Brackets ==
=== Team ===
First round
Stanford | 4
Louisiana–Monroe | 0
Colorado | 0
Michigan | 4
Oklahoma State | 1
Harvard | 4
Arizona | 4
Niagara | 0
Alabama | 4
Oklahoma | 0
Georgia | 4
UMBC | 0
Kentucky | 4
Hampton | 0
Miami (FL) | 4
Purdue | 1
LSU | 0
Texas A&M | 4
California | 4
Army | 0
North Carolina | 4
College of Charleston | 0
Baylor | 1
Clemson | 4
USC | 4
Sacramento State | 0
Georgia Tech | 4
Cal Poly | 0
Kansas State | 4
Northwestern | 1
Illinois State | 0
VCU | 4
UCLA | 4
IUPUI | 0
Minnesota | 3
Pepperdine | 4
Washington | 4
Southern | 0
Illinois | 4
UNLV | 1
Temple | 0
William & Mary | 4
Marshall | 2
South Alabama | 4
Duke | 4
Winthrop | 0
South Carolina | 4
Penn | 3
Vanderbilt | 4
Boston University | 0
Notre Dame | 4
Missouri | 1
Tennessee | 4
Murray State | 0
Ohio State | 0
Virginia | 4
Arizona State | 4
Illinois–Chicago | 0
Fresno State | 4
San Diego State | 0
Florida | 4
Florida Atlantic | 0
Texas | 0
Tulane | 4

Second round
Stanford | 4
Michigan | 0
Harvard | 4
Arizona | 3
Alabama | 1
Georgia | 4
Kentucky | 4
Miami (FL) | 3
Texas A&M | 0
California | 4
North Carolina | 4
Clemson | 1
USC | 4
Georgia Tech | 0
Kansas State | 4
VCU | 2
UCLA | 4
Pepperdine | 1
Washington | 4
Illinois | 0
William & Mary | 4
South Alabama | 1
Duke | 4
South Carolina | 0
Vanderbilt | 4
Notre Dame | 0
Tennessee | 4
Virginia | 1
Arizona State | 4
Fresno State | 2
Florida | 4
Tulane | 1

Third round
Stanford | 4
Harvard | 0
Georgia | 4
Kentucky | 0
California | 4
North Carolina | 1
USC | 4
Kansas State | 0
UCLA | 4
Washington State | 3
William & Mary | 0
Duke | 5
Vanderbilt | 4
Tennessee | 3
Arizona State | 0
Florida | 4

Quarterfinals
Stanford | 4
Georgia | 0
California | 4
USC | 1
UCLA | 0
Duke | 4
Vanderbilt | 0
Florida | 4

Semifinals
Stanford | 4
California | 1
Duke | 1
Florida | 4

Championship
Stanford | 3
Florida | 4

== See also ==
- 2003 NCAA Division I men's tennis championships
- 2003 NCAA Division II women's tennis championships
- 2003 NCAA Division III women's tennis championships
- 2003 NAIA women's tennis championships
