= 2001 NCAA Division I women's tennis championships =

- Date: May 2001
- Edition: 20th
- Location: Atlanta, Georgia
- Venue: Bill Moore Tennis Center; Georgia Institute of Technology

Champions

Women's singles
- (United States) Laura Granville (Stanford)

Women's doubles
- (United States) Whitney Laiho / (United States) Jessica Lehnhoff (Florida)

Women's team
- Stanford
← 2000 ·	NCAA Division I women's tennis championships	· 2002 →

The 2001 NCAA Division I Women's Tennis Championships were the 20th annual championships to determine the national champions of NCAA Division I women's singles, doubles, and team collegiate tennis in the United States.

Stanford defeated Vanderbilt in the team final, 4–0, to claim their eleventh national title (and third in five years).

== Host ==
This year's tournaments were hosted by Georgia Tech at the Bill Moore Tennis Center in Atlanta, Georgia.

The men's and women's NCAA tennis championships would not be held concurrently at the same venue until 2006.

== Bracket ==
=== Team ===
First round
Boston University	0
Stanford	4
LSU	1
Ole Miss	4
Oklahoma State	4
Oral Roberts	0
Illinois State	0
Wake Forest	4
Arizona State	4
UMass	0
Florida State	2
South Carolina	4
California	4
Loyola Maryland	0
Iowa	1
North Carolina	4
Bethune–Cookman	0
Florida	4
Arkansas	4
Miami (FL)	1
Eastern Michigan	0
Notre Dame	4
Texas A&M	3
Tulane	4
Furman	0
Tennessee	4
Indiana	0
Washington State	4
Army	0
Washington	4
Illinois	4
VCU	2
Georgia Tech	3
UCLA	4
Cal State Northridge	1
Fresno State	4
FIU	4
Penn State	0
Murray State	0
Vanderbilt	4
Boise State	0
TCU	4
Alcorn State	0
Texas	4
Alabama	4
BYU	2
Campbell	0
Duke	4
Old Dominion	3
South Alabama	4
USC	4
UMBC	0
Kentucky	4
Virginia	0
Illinois–Chicago	0
Northwestern	4
Penn	4
Pepperdine	3
Baylor	4
Texas–Arlington	0
Mississippi State	4
Ohio State	3
Georgia	4
Coastal Carolina	3

Second round
Stanford	4
Ole Miss	0
Oklahoma State	3
Wake Forest	4
Arizona State	4
South Carolina	2
California	4
North Carolina	1
Florida	4
Arkansas	0
Notre Dame	4
Tulane	0
Tennessee	4
Washington State	0
Washington	4
Illinois	0
UCLA	4
Fresno State	3
Florida International	0
Vanderbilt	4
TCU	1
Texas	4
Alabama	0
Duke	4
South Alabama	1
USC	4
Kentucky	1
Northwestern	4
Penn	0
Baylor	4
Mississippi State	0
Georgia	4

Third round
Stanford	4
Wake Forest	0
Arizona State	4
California	2
Florida	4
Notre Dame	1
Tennessee	3
Washington	4
UCLA	1
Vanderbilt	4
Texas	2
Duke	4
USC	5
Northwestern	1
Baylor	0
Georgia	5

Quarterfinals
Stanford	4
Arizona State	0
Florida	4
Washington	0
Vanderbilt	4
Duke	1
USC	0
Georgia	4

Semifinals
Stanford	4
Florida	0
Vanderbilt	4
Georgia	2

Championship
Stanford	4
Vanderbilt	0

== See also ==
- 2001 NCAA Division I men's tennis championships
- 2001 NCAA Division II women's tennis championships
- 2001 NCAA Division III women's tennis championships
- 2001 NAIA women's tennis championships
