= 1986 NCAA Division I women's tennis championships =

1986 NCAA Division I Women's Tennis Championships
- Date: June 1986
- Edition: 5th
- Location: Austin, Texas
- Venue: Penick-Allison Tennis Center (University of Texas)

Champions

Women's singles
- (United States) Patty Fendick (Stanford)

Women's doubles
- (South Africa) Lise Gregory / (United States) Ronni Reis (Miami–FL)
← 1985 ·	NCAA Division I Women's Tennis Championships	· 1987 →

The 1986 NCAA Division I Women's Tennis Championships were the fifth annual championships to determine the national champions of NCAA Division I women's singles, doubles, and team collegiate tennis in the United States.

The women's team championship was won by Stanford, their second title in three years. This was the first time that the men's and women's team from the same school won championships in the same year. The Cardinal defeated rivals USC in the final round, 5–4.

The women's singles title was won by Patty Fendick from Stanford.

The women's doubles title was won by South African Lise Gregory and American Ronni Reis from Miami (FL).

== Host site ==
This year's tournaments were held at the Penick-Allison Tennis Center at the University of Texas at Austin in Austin, Texas. The men's and women's tournaments would not be held at the same site until 2006.

== Team tournament ==
First round
Stanford	8
Harvard	1
Northwestern	6
UCLA	3
California	6
Texas	2
Miami (FL)	8
U.S. International	1
Trinity (TX)	8
Kentucky	1
Oklahoma State	6
San Diego State	3
Arizona State	5
Clemson	4
USC	8
Texas A&M	1

Quarterfinals
Stanford	5
Northwestern	1
California	3
Miami (FL)	5
Trinity (TX)	5
Oklahoma State	2
Arizona State	1
USC	5

Semifinals
Stanford	6
Miami (FL)	3
Trinity (TX)	3
USC	6

Championship
Stanford	5
USC	4
Third place
Miami (FL)	5
Trinity	4

== See also ==
- 1986 NCAA Division I Tennis Championships
- 1986 NCAA Division I Men's Tennis Championships
- NCAA Division II Tennis Championships (Men, Women)
- NCAA Division III Tennis Championships (Men, Women)
