= Tennessee Lady Volunteers women's tennis =

Tennessee Lady Volunteers tennis
- Founded: 1977
- University: University of Tennessee
- Athletic director: Danny White
- Head coach: Alison Ojeda (8th season)
- Conference: SEC
- Location: Knoxville, TN
- Home Court: Barksdale Stadium (Capacity: 2,000)
- Nickname: Lady Volunteers
- Colors: Orange and white

NCAA Tournament Semifinals
- 2002, 2024

NCAA Tournament Quarterfinals
- 2002, 2010, 2024

NCAA Tournament Round of 16
- 1990, 1992, 1997, 1998, 1999, 2000, 2001, 2002, 2003, 2004, 2010, 2023, 2024, 2025

NCAA Tournament Round of 32
- 1989, 1991, 1995, 1996, 1997, 1998, 1999, 2000, 2001, 2002, 2003, 2004, 2005, 2007, 2008, 2009, 2010, 2011, 2012, 2013, 2017, 2019, 2021, 2022, 2023, 2024, 2025

NCAA Tournament appearances
- 1989, 1990, 1991, 1992, 1995, 1996, 1997, 1998, 1999, 2000, 2001, 2002, 2003, 2004, 2005, 2006, 2007, 2008, 2009, 2010, 2011, 2012, 2013, 2014, 2017, 2018, 2019, 2021, 2022, 2023, 2024, 2025

The Tennessee Lady Volunteers women's tennis team represents the University of Tennessee, in Knoxville, TN. The program has qualified for 31 NCAA Tournaments, including 20 straight from 1995 to 2014. They are led by former player and current 8th year head coach Alison Ojeda.

Along with all other UT women's sports teams, it used the nickname "Lady Volunteers" (or the short form "Lady Vols") until the 2015–16 school year, when the school dropped the "Lady" prefix from the nicknames of all women's teams except in basketball. In 2017 the university announced the return of the “Lady Volunteer” name.

== History ==
All-time, the Lady Vols have appeared in 30 NCAA tournaments with their best result being a semifinal berth in 2002. This puts them at 4th in the SEC in terms of NCAA appearances behind Florida (40), Georgia (36), and South Carolina (32). Additionally the women's tennis team is one of only 2 programs at Tennessee (the other is women's golf) to never win a conference championship. The Lady Vols have finished 2nd in the SEC Regular Season 5 times (2001, 2003, 2009, 2010, 2011), and lost in the final of the SEC Tournament 4 times (2001, 2009, 2010, 2011).

=== Mike Patrick and Sonia Hahn-Patrick era ===
Mike Patrick led the Lady Volunteer Tennis program for 30 years, 20 of which where he served as Co-Head Coach with his with Sonia Han-Patrick, before he resigned on November 16, 2016. Patrick was the winningest coach in Lady Vol program history compiling a 473-310 all-time record. Of Patrick's 30 seasons, 23 teams finished the year ranked in the top 25. Patrick's best finish in the NCAA tournament came with a semifinal appearance in 2002. Additionally, the 2001 team achieved the programs first #1 national ranking, and finished 6th in the nation with a 25-4 (10-1 SEC) record. They came within 1 match of an SEC Regular season title following a 4-3 loss to #5 Florida, and subsequently lost the SEC Tournament final to #2 Georgia. Patrick's assistant coach Alison Ojeda, a former All-American at Tennessee, took over the program in 2017.

=== Alison Ojeda era ===
In Ojeda's first six seasons as head coach, she has guided the Lady Vols to the NCAA Tournament every season but 2020 when the tournament was cancelled.

The 2017 season saw Tennessee finish with their most wins since 2011, posting a 19-12 record, and finishing the season ranked #24 in the ITA rankings. The season ended in the NCAA round of 32 with a 4-1 loss to #15 seed Duke.

The 2018 season began with a 12-0 record, the programs best start in program a history; however, the team struggled in SEC play finishing with a 3-10 conference record. The year ended with an 18-12 mark, and a 4-2 loss to Oregon in the first round of the NCAA Tournament.

In Ojeda's third season (2019), Tennessee reached new heights by finishing with their most wins since 2003, and making their third consecutive NCAA tournament. The team finished 4th in the SEC with a 9-4 record, and was ranked #20 in the ITA rankings with a 20-8 record. The run ended with a 4-0 loss in the NCAA second round to #12 seed NC State.

In 2020, Tennessee got off to a 10-3 (1-2 SEC) before the season was cancelled due to the COVID-19 pandemic after their 4-3 match win against Ole Miss.

The 2021 season saw Tennessee finish 5th in the SEC with an 8-5 mark in SEC play. They entered the NCAA Tournament with a 16-8 record after a loss in the SEC tournament semifinal to #3 ranked Georgia. Despite being ranked 15th in the ITA rankings, the Lady Vols were not awarded one of the NCAA Tournament's top 16 seeds, who host the first and second rounds of the tournament. Thus, they travelled to the Charlottesville regional, where the beat James Madison 4-0 in the round of 64, then fell to #14 seed Virginia, in a close match, 4-2. This concluded the 2021 season, and the team's 17-9 campaign.

The 2022 season saw the Lady Vols return to the NCAA tournament for the 5th season in a row (2020 tournament was cancelled), and finish 7th in the conference with a 7-6 record. They advanced to the semifinals of the SEC Tournament via a 4-2 upset of #2 seed and twelfth ranked Auburn. The season concluded with a 16-10 record and a 4-1 loss to #6 NC State in the NCAA round of 32.

Under Ojeda, the 2023 team had their best season in over a decade. Big SEC wins over #17 Vanderbilt (4-3), #8 Auburn (6-1), and #17 Florida (4-1) propelled the Lady Vols a 3rd place SEC finish, their highest since 2013. Tennessee advanced to the semifinals of the SEC tournament for the 3rd year in a row, and hosted an NCAA Regional for the first time since 2011. As the #15 seed, Tennessee defeated Southeast Missouri State (4-0), and Wake Forest (4-1) to advance to the Round of 16 for the first time since 2010. There, they concluded the 21-6 campaign by falling in the College Station Super Regional to #2 Texas A&M 4-1.

== Head coaches ==
#	Coach	Years	Seasons	Overall			Conference		
#	Coach	Years	Seasons	Won	Lost	%	Won	Lost	%
1	Mary Jane Ramsey	1977–1978	2	21	17	.553	–	–	–
2	Mary Ellis Richardson	1978–1981	3	49	14	.778	–	–	–
3	Frank Ackley	1981–1983	2	46	19	.708	13	5	.722
4	Elizabeth Henderson	1983–1987	4	52	57	.477	8	32	.200
5	Mike Patrick	1988–2016	29	473	310	.604	187	133	.584
6	Sonia Hahn-Patrick	1998–2016	19	314	203	.607	122	95	.562
7	Alison Ojeda	2016-Pres.	7	121	60	.669	43	38	.531
Total			47	762	477	.615	251	208	.547

== Yearly Record ==
Season	Coach	Record		Conference standing	Conference tournament	ITA rank	Postseason
Season	Coach	Overall	Conference	Conference standing	Conference tournament	ITA rank	Postseason
Independent (AIAW)
1977	Mary Jane Ramsey	7-4	–	–	–	–	–
1978	Mary Jane Ramsey	14-13	–	–	–	–	–
1979	Mary Ellis Richardson	14-3	–	–	–	–	–
1980	Mary Ellis Richardson	16-4	–	–	–	–	–
1981	Mary Ellis Richardson	19-7	–	–	–	–	–
Southeastern Conference (NCAA)
1982	Frank Ackley	25-7	7-2	4th	–	–	–
1983	Frank Ackley	21-12	6-3	4th	–	–	–
1984	Elizabeth Henderson	9-16	2-9	9th	–	–	–
1985	Elizabeth Henderson	14-14	3-8	6th	–	–	–
1986	Elizabeth Henderson	14-14	1-8	8th	–	–	–
1987	Elizabeth Henderson	15-13	2-7	8th	–	–	–
1988	Mike Patrick	17-8	6-3	5th	–	24th	–
1989	Mike Patrick	15-7	7-2	3rd	–	17th	NCAA First Round
1990	Mike Patrick	19-8	6-2	4th	Semifinal	12th	NCAA Round of 16
1991	Mike Patrick	17-14	5-6	5th	Quarterfinal	15th	NCAA First Round
1992	Mike Patrick	20-9	8-3	3rd	Semifinal	11th	NCAA Round of 16
1993	Mike Patrick	13-14	6-5	6th	Quarterfinal	21st	–
1994	Mike Patrick	6-16	3-8	9th	First Round	39th	–
1995	Mike Patrick	16-8	8-3	3rd	Quarterfinal	12th	NCAA First Round
1996	Mike Patrick	16-13	8-3	4th	Quarterfinal	17th	NCAA Second Round
1997	Mike Patrick	20-10	8-3	4th	Semifinal	13th	NCAA Round of 16
1998	Mike Patrick & Sonia Hahn-Patrick	20-11	6-5	6th	Semifinal	15th	NCAA Round of 16
1999	Mike Patrick & Sonia Hahn-Patrick	18-8	5-6	7th	Quarterfinal	14th	NCAA Round of 16
2000	Mike Patrick & Sonia Hahn-Patrick	20-12	7-4	5th	Semifinal	14th	NCAA Round of 16
2001	Mike Patrick & Sonia Hahn-Patrick	25-4	10-1	2nd	Final	6th	NCAA Round of 16
2002	Mike Patrick & Sonia Hahn-Patrick	21-10	7-4	5th	Quarterfinal	12th	NCAA Semifinal
2003	Mike Patrick & Sonia Hahn-Patrick	22-7	9-2	T-2nd	Semifinal	10th	NCAA Round of 16
2004	Mike Patrick & Sonia Hahn-Patrick	15-14	7-4	4th	Quarterfinal	19th	NCAA Round of 16
2005	Mike Patrick & Sonia Hahn-Patrick	15-9	7-4	T-4th	Quarterfinal	18th	NCAA Second Round
2006	Mike Patrick & Sonia Hahn-Patrick	12-13	6-5	5th	Semifinal	32nd	NCAA First Round
2007	Mike Patrick & Sonia Hahn-Patrick	14-11	6-5	T-5th	Semifinal	23rd	NCAA Second Round
2008	Mike Patrick & Sonia Hahn-Patrick	15-10	6-5	4th	Quarterfinal	24th	NCAA Second Round
2009	Mike Patrick & Sonia Hahn-Patrick	18-7	8-3	2nd	Final	10th	NCAA Second Round
2010	Mike Patrick & Sonia Hahn-Patrick	19-9	8-3	2nd	Final	13th	NCAA Quarterfinal
2011	Mike Patrick & Sonia Hahn-Patrick	20-8	9-2	2nd	Final	17th	NCAA Second Round
2012	Mike Patrick & Sonia Hahn-Patrick	15-13	4-7	5th	Quarterfinal	24th	NCAA Second Round
2013	Mike Patrick & Sonia Hahn-Patrick	13-12	7-6	3rd	Quarterfinal	31st	NCAA Second Round
2014	Mike Patrick & Sonia Hahn-Patrick	13-13	6-7	6th	Second Round	34th	NCAA First Round
2015	Mike Patrick & Sonia Hahn-Patrick	11-15	3-10	13th	First Round	61st	–
2016	Mike Patrick & Sonia Hahn-Patrick	8-17	1-12	13th	First Round	–	–
2017	Alison Ojeda	19-12	4-9	11th	Second Round	24th	NCAA Second Round
2018	Alison Ojeda	18-12	3-10	12th	Second Round	40th	NCAA First Round
2019	Alison Ojeda	20-8	9-4	4th	Quarterfinal	22nd	NCAA Second Round
2020	Alison Ojeda	10-3	1-2	–	–	–	Postseason not held (COVID-19)
2021	Alison Ojeda	17-9	8-5	5th	Semifinal	18th	NCAA Second Round
2022	Alison Ojeda	16-10	7-6	7th	Semifinal	24th	NCAA Second Round
2023	Alison Ojeda	21-6	11-2	3rd	Semifinal	14th	NCAA Round of 16
Total		762–477	SEC: 251-208				30 NCAA Appearances

== NCAA Tournament Results ==
In the NCAA Tournament, Tennessee holds a 37-30 record. In the first two rounds of regional matches hosted in Knoxville, the Lady Vols have a 17-2 record, compared with a 32-20 record at other regional sites. In the Round of 16 and beyond, the team is 3-10.

Year	Seed	Round	Opponent	Result
1989		First Round	#15 San Diego	L 7-2
1990	#10	Round of 16	#7 USC	L 7-2
1991		First Round	#15 San Diego St	L 5-1
1992	#13	Round of 16	#4 Georgia	L 5-0
1995	#16	First Round	LSU	L 5-3
1996		Regional QF; Regional SF	Auburn #14 Georgia	W 5-0; L 5-3
1997	#12	Regional QF; Regional SF; Regional Final; Round of 16	Baylor; Houston; LSU #5 UCLA	W 5-1; W 5-0; W 5-2; L 5-0
1998	#15	Regional QF; Regional SF; Regional Final; Round of 16	Clemson; South Alabama; Vanderbilt #2 Stanford	W 5-0; W 5-3; W 5-4; L 6-0
1999	#15	First Round; Second Round; Round of 16	Tennessee Tech; Wisconsin #2 Stanford	W 5-0; W 5-2; L 5-1
2000		First Round; Second Round; Round of 16	Princeton #14 William & Mary #3 Wake Forest	W 5-1; W 5-3; L 5-0
2001	#5	First Round; Second Round; Round of 16	Furman; Washington State #12 Washington	W 4-0; W 4-0; L 4-3
2002	#13	First Round; Second Round; Round of 16; Quarterfinals; Semifinals	Marshall; Alabama #4 Vanderbilt; VCU #1 Florida	W 4-0; W 4-0; W 4-2; W 4-3; L 4-1
2003	#7	First Round; Second Round; Round of 16	Murray State; Virginia #10 Vanderbilt	W 4-0; W 4-1; L 4-3
2004	#14	First Round; Second Round; Round of 16	Wisconsin; North Carolina #3 Vanderbilt	W 4-3; W 4-3; L 4-1
2005		First Round; Second Round	Boston U #16 Harvard	W 4-0; L 4-1
2006		First Round	Penn	L 4-2
2007		First Round; Second Round	Tulsa #16 Vanderbilt	W 4-0; L 4-0
2008		First Round; Second Round	Illinois #3 Georgia Tech	W 4-0; L 4-0
2009	#10	First Round; Second Round	East Tennessee State; South Carolina	W 4-0; L 4-3
2010	#13	First Round; Second Round; Round of 16; Quarterfinals	Winthrop; Vanderbilt #4 Michigan #5 Notre Dame	W 4-0; W 4-1; W 4-0; L 4-2
2011	#13	First Round; Second Round	College of Charleston; Vanderbilt	W 4-1; L 4-3
2012		First Round; Second Round	VCU #14 Virginia	W 4-0; L 4-1
2013		First Round; Second Round	VCU #2 North Carolina	W 4-0; L 4-1
2014		First Round	Georgia State	L 4-3
2017		First Round; Second Round	Winthrop #15 Duke	W 4-1; L 4-1
2018		First Round	Oregon	L 4-2
2019		First Round; Second Round	Furman #12 NC State	W 4-0; L 4-0
2021		First Round; Second Round	James Madison #14 Virginia	W 4-0; L 4-2
2022		First Round; Second Round	VCU #6 NC State	W 4-1; L 4-1
2023	#15	First Round; Second Round; Round of 16	SE Missouri State; Wake Forest #2 Texas A&M	W 4-0; W 4-1; L 4-1
2024	#16	First Round; Second Round; Round of 16; Quarterfinals; Semifinals	Murray State; Duke #1 Oklahoma State #8 UCLA #13 Texas A&M	W 4-0; W 4-0; W 4-2; W 4-3; L 4-1

== See also ==
- Tennessee Volunteers men's tennis
