= 1993 NCAA Division I women's tennis championships =

1993 NCAA Division I Women's Tennis Championships
- Date: May 16–20, 1993
- Edition: 12th
- Location: Gainesville, Florida
- Venue: Linder Stadium; University of Florida

Champions

Women's singles
- Lisa Raymond (Florida)

Women's doubles
- Alix Creek / Michelle Oldham (Arizona)
← 1992 ·	NCAA Division I Women's Tennis Championships	· 1994 →

The 1993 NCAA Division I Women's Tennis Championships were the 12th annual championships to determine the national champions of NCAA Division I women's singles, doubles, and team collegiate tennis in the United States, held from May 16–20, 1993 in Gainesville, Florida.

== Host ==
This year's tournaments were hosted by the University of Florida at the Ring Tennis Complex in Gainesville, Florida. This was the third time the Gators hosted the women's championships (1989 and 1990).

The men's and women's NCAA tennis championships would not be held jointly until 2006.

== Brackets ==
=== Team ===
First round
Clemson	5
Kansas	3
BYU	5
Virginia	3
Ole Miss	5
San Diego State	3
Notre Dame	5
Alabama	0

Second round
Duke	5
Clemson	0
Texas	5
USC	1
Florida	5
BYU	0
Arizona State	5
UCLA	1
California	5
Ole Miss	2
Arizona	5
Pepperdine	4
Stanford	5
Notre Dame	0
Georgia	5
Indiana	3

Quarterfinals
Duke	3
Texas	5
Florida	5
Arizona State	1
California	2
Arizona	5
Stanford	5
Georgia	1

Semifinals
Texas	5
Florida	4
Arizona	1
Stanford	5

Championship
Texas	5
Stanford	2

== See also ==
- 1993 NCAA Division I men's tennis championships
- NCAA Division II Tennis Championships (Men, Women)
- NCAA Division III Tennis Championships (Men, Women)
