= 1990 NCAA Division I women's tennis championships =

1990 NCAA Division I Women's Tennis Championships
- Date: June 1990
- Edition: 9th
- Location: Gainesville, Florida
- Venue: (United States) Linder Stadium; University of Florida

Champions

Women's singles
- (United States) Debbie Graham (Stanford)

Women's doubles
- (United States) Meredith McGrath / (United States) Teri Whitlinger (Stanford)
← 1989 ·	NCAA Division I Women's Tennis Championships	· 1991 →

The 1990 NCAA Division I Women's Tennis Championships were the ninth annual championships to determine the national champions of NCAA Division I women's singles, doubles, and team collegiate tennis in the United States.

For the fifth consecutive year, Stanford claimed the women's team national title, the Cardinal's seventh.

== Host sites ==
The women's tournaments were held in Gainesville, Florida, hosted by the University of Florida. The men's and women's tournaments would not be held at the same site until 2006.

== Team tournament ==
First round
Arizona	6
BYU	0
Kentucky	4
San Diego	5
South Carolina	6
William & Mary	0
Indiana	5
San Diego State	3

Second round
Stanford	6
Arizona	0
Georgia	5
Oklahoma State	1
California	6
San Diego	0
Duke	0
Texas	5
Arizona State	1
Pepperdine	5
UCLA	6
South Carolina	0
USC	7
Tennessee	2
Florida	6
Indiana	0

Quarterfinals
Stanford	6
Georgia	0
California	4
Texas	5
Pepperdine	4
UCLA	5
USC	2
Florida	5

Semifinals
Stanford	6
Texas	1
UCLA	4
Florida	5

Championship
Stanford	5
Florida	1

== See also ==
- 1990 NCAA Division I Men's Tennis Championships
- NCAA Division II Tennis Championships (Men, Women)
- NCAA Division III Tennis Championships (Men, Women)
