= 1984 NCAA Division I women's tennis championships =

1984 NCAA Division I Women's Tennis Championships
- Date: June 1984
- Edition: 3rd
- Location: Los Angeles, California
- Venue: (United States) Los Angeles Tennis Center (UCLA)

Champions

Women's singles
- Lisa Spain (Georgia)

Women's doubles
- Elise Burgin / Linda Gates (Stanford)
← 1983 ·	NCAA Division I Women's Tennis Championships	· 1985 →

The 1984 NCAA Division I Women's Tennis Championships were the third annual championships to determine the national champions of NCAA Division I women's singles, doubles, and team collegiate tennis in the United States.

The women's team championship was won by Stanford, their second title in three years. The Cardinal defeated defending national champion, USC, in the final round, 6–0.

The women's singles title was won by Lisa Spain from Georgia, and the women's doubles title was won by Elise Burgin and Linda Gates from Stanford.

This was the first time the men's and women's singles titles were won by players from the same school (Georgia).

== Host site ==
This year's tournaments were hosted by the University of California, Los Angeles at the Los Angeles Tennis Center in Los Angeles, California. The men's and women's tournaments would not be held at the same site until 2006.

== Team tournament ==
First round
Stanford	9
Clemson	0
UCLA	6
Northwestern	3
Texas	8
South Florida	1
San Diego State	7
California	2
USC	8
Harvard	1
Miami (FL)	7
Oklahoma State	2
Florida	5
SMU	4
Trinity (TX)	7
Pepperdine	2

Quarterfinals
Stanford	8
UCLA	1
Texas	3
San Diego State	6
USC	7
Miami (FL)	2
Florida	2
Trinity (TX)	7

Semifinals
Stanford	7
San Diego State	2
USC	5
Trinity (TX)	4

Championship
Stanford	6
USC	0
Third place
San Diego State	4
Trinity (TX)	5

== See also ==
- 1984 NCAA Division I men's tennis championships
- NCAA Division II Tennis Championships (Men, Women)
- NCAA Division III Tennis Championships (Men, Women)
- NAIA tennis championships (men, women)
