= 2004 NCAA Division I women's tennis championships =

- Date: May 2004
- Edition: 23rd
- Location: (Georgia (U.S. state)) Athens, Georgia
- Venue: Dan Magill Tennis Complex; University of Georgia

Champions

Women's singles
- (United States) Amber Liu (Stanford)

Women's doubles
- (Serbia and Montenegro) Daniela Bercek / (United States) Lauren Fisher (UCLA)

Women's team
- Stanford
← 2003 ·	NCAA Division I women's tennis championships	· 2005 →

The 2004 NCAA Division I women's tennis championships were the 23rd annual championships hosted by the NCAA to determine the national champions of women's singles, doubles, and team collegiate tennis among its Division I member programs in the United States.

Stanford defeated UCLA in the team final, 4–1, to claim their thirteenth national title, the Cardinal's fifth title in eight years.

Additionally, Stanford's Amber Liu became the fourth player to repeat as the singles national champion.

== Host ==
This year's tournaments were hosted by the University of Georgia at the Dan Magill Tennis Complex in Athens, Georgia.

The men's and women's NCAA tennis championships would not be held concurrently at the same site until 2006.

== Brackets ==
=== Team ===
First round May 14–16, 2004
1	Florida	4
49	Hampton	0
Gainesville, FL
17	Miami (FL)	4
33	South Alabama	1
16	Tulane	4
49	Richmond	0
Norman, OK
17	Oklahoma	4
33	Tulsa	1
8	USC	4
49	American	0
Los Angeles, CA
17	Indiana	2
33	Arizona	4
9	UCLA	4
49	Long Beach State	0
Los Angeles, CA
17	BYU	2
33	Pepperdine	4
4	Washington	4
49	Fairfield	0
Seattle, WA
17	New Mexico	3
33	Oregon	4
13	Texas	4
49	Texas–Arlington	0
Austin, TX
17	LSU	1
33	Arizona State	4
5	Clemson	4
49	Troy State	0
Clemson, SC
17	Wake Forest	1
33	South Carolina	4
12	Texas A&M	4
49	Southern	1
College Station, TX
17	TCU	2
33	SMU	4
11	California	4
49	Illinois State	0
Berkeley, CA
17	Fresno State	4
33	Sacramento State	3
6	Georgia	4
49	Samford	0
Athens, GA
17	Alabama	0
33	Georgia Tech	4
14	North Carolina	4
49	Winthrop	0
Chapel Hill, NC
17	Tennessee	4
33	Wisconsin	3
3	Vanderbilt	4
49	IUPUI	0
Nashville, TN
17	Florida State	4
33	Marshall	2
10	Northwestern	4
49	Illinois–Chicago	0
Evanston, IL
17	Notre Dame	4
33	Iowa	1
7	Duke	4
49	Furman	0
Durham, NC
17	Illinois	2
33	William & Mary	4
15	Kentucky	4
49	Boston University	0
Cambridge, MA
17	Harvard	2
33	Ohio State	4
2	Stanford	4
49	Quinnipiac	0
Stanford, CA
17	Michigan	4
33	Denver	1

Second round May 14–16, 2004
1	Florida	3
17	Miami (FL)	4
16	Tulane	4
17	Oklahoma	2
8	USC	4
33	Arizona	0
9	UCLA	4
33	Pepperdine	2
4	Washington	4
33	Oregon	3
13	Texas	0
33	Arizona State	4
5	Clemson	4
33	South Carolina	1
12	Texas A&M	4
33	SMU	1
11	California	3
17	Fresno State	4
6	Georgia	4
33	Georgia Tech	0
14	North Carolina	3
17	Tennessee	4
3	Vanderbilt	4
17	Florida State	1
10	Northwestern	4
17	Notre Dame	1
7	Duke	4
33	William & Mary	0
15	Kentucky	4
33	Ohio State	0
2	Stanford	4
17	Michigan	0

Third round May 20, 2004
17	Miami (FL)	4
16	Tulane	1
8	USC	2
9	UCLA	4
4	Washington	4
33	Arizona State	2
5	Clemson	4
12	Texas A&M	1
17	Fresno State	2
6	Georgia	4
17	Tennessee	1
3	Vanderbilt	4
10	Northwestern	1
7	Duke	4
15	Kentucky	0
2	Stanford	4

Quarterfinals; May 21, 2004
17	Miami (FL)	3
9	UCLA	4
4	Washington	3
5	Clemson	4
6	Georgia	1
3	Vanderbilt	4
7	Duke	0
2	Stanford	4

Semifinals; May 22, 2004
9	UCLA	4
5	Clemson	0
3	Vanderbilt	0
2	Stanford	4

Championship; May 23, 2004
9	UCLA	1
2	Stanford	4

== See also ==
- 2004 NCAA Division I men's tennis championships
- 2004 NCAA Division II women's tennis championships
- 2004 NCAA Division III women's tennis championships
- 2004 NAIA women's tennis championships
