= 1999 NCAA Division I women's tennis championships =

- Date: May 1999
- Edition: 18th
- Location: Gainesville, Florida
- Venue: Linder Stadium; University of Florida

Champions

Women's singles
- (Czech Republic) Zuzana Lešenarová (San Diego)

Women's doubles
- (United States) Amanda Augustus / (United States) Amy Jensen (California)

Women's team
- Stanford
| ← 1998 · | NCAA Division I women's tennis championships | · 2000 → |

The 1999 NCAA Division I women's tennis championships were the 18th annual championships to determine the national champions of NCAA Division I women's singles, doubles, and team collegiate tennis in the United States.

Stanford defeated hosts, and defending champions, Florida in the team final, 5–2, to claim their tenth national title.

== Host ==
This year's tournaments were hosted by the University of Florida at the Linder Stadium in Gainesville, Florida.

The men's and women's NCAA tennis championships would not be held concurrently at the same venue until 2006.

== Bracket ==
=== Team ===
First round
Florida | 5
Bethune–Cookman | 0
Arizona | 5
Auburn | 1
Vanderbilt | 6
Loyola Maryland | 0
Kentucky | 5
Tulane | 4
UCLA | 5
Western Michigan | 0
Colorado | 0
South Alabama | 5
Boston University | 0
Pepperdine | 5
LSU | 5
Ohio State | 2
Maryland | 0
Ole Miss | 5
North Carolina | 5
Washington | 4
UMBC | 0
William & Mary | 6
Fresno State | 7
Harvard | 2
Duke | 5
Oral Roberts | 0
Kansas | 5
New Mexico | 3
Illinois–Chicago | 0
Notre Dame | 9
Florida State | 4
Iowa | 5
Illinois | 3
Northwestern | 5
Arizona State | 6
Northern Arizona | 0
Marquette | 5
San Diego State | 1
Army | 0
California | 5
Virginia Tech | 0
Wake Forest | 5
Furman | 1
South Carolina | 5
Mississippi State | 6
Washington State | 0
Central Florida | 0
Georgia | 5
Minnesota | 1
San Diego | 5
Drake | 0
USC | 6
Baylor | 1
Miami (FL) | 5
Texas | 5
Texas–Arlington | 0
Arkansas | 4
Wisconsin | 5
Tennessee | 5
Tennessee Tech | 0
Oregon | 5
South Florida | 1
Pacific | 0
Stanford | 5

Second round
Florida | 5
Arizona | 1
Vanderbilt | 5
Kentucky | 0
UCLA | 2
South Alabama | 5
Pepperdine | 5
LSU | 1
Ole Miss | 5
North Carolina | 1
William & Mary | 3
Fresno State | 5
Duke | 5
Kansas | 0
Notre Dame | 4
Iowa | 5
Northwestern | 2
Arizona State | 5
Marquette | 1
California | 5
Wake Forest | 2
South Carolina | 5
Mississippi State | 0
Georgia | 5
San Diego | 1
USC | 5
Miami (FL) | 5
Texas | 4
Wisconsin | 2
Tennessee | 5
Oregon | 0
Stanford | 5

Third round
Florida | 5
Vanderbilt | 0
South Alabama | 5
Pepperdine | 2
Ole Miss | 5
Fresno State | 1
Duke | 5
Iowa | 0
Arizona State | 4
California | 5
South Carolina | 1
Georgia | 5
USC | 5
Miami (FL) | 4
Tennessee | 1
Stanford | 5

Quarterfinals
Florida | 5
South Alabama | 0
Ole Miss | 0
Duke | 5
California | 5
Georgia | 4
USC | 1
Stanford | 5

Semifinals
Florida | 5
Duke | 2
California | 1
Stanford | 5

Championship
Florida | 2
Stanford | 5

== See also ==
- 1999 NCAA Division I men's tennis championships
- 1999 NCAA Division II women's tennis championships
- 1999 NCAA Division III women's tennis championships
- 1999 NAIA women's tennis championships
