= 1985 NCAA Division I women's tennis championships =

1985 NCAA Division I Women's Tennis Championships
- Date: June 1985
- Edition: 4th
- Location: Oklahoma City, Oklahoma
- Venue: Oklahoma City Tennis Center (Oklahoma State University)

Champions

Women's singles
- Linda Gates (Stanford)

Women's doubles
- Leigh-Anne Eldredge / Linda Gates (Stanford)
← 1984 ·	NCAA Division I Women's Tennis Championships	· 1986 →

The 1985 NCAA Division I Women's Tennis Championships were the fourth annual championships to determine the national champions of NCAA Division I women's singles, doubles, and team collegiate tennis in the United States.

The women's team championship was won by USC, their second title in three years. The Trojans defeated Miami (FL) in the final round, 6–3.

The women's singles title was won by Linda Gates from Stanford. Gates, along with partner Leigh-Anne Eldredge (both from Stanford), also won the women's double title, her second consecutive championship in the event.

Gates became the first woman to win consecutive NCAA Division I double's titles as well as the first woman to win the single's and double's championship in the same year. This feat would not be accomplished again until Keri Phebus, from UCLA, won both titles in 1995.

== Host site ==
This year's tournaments were hosted by Oklahoma State University at the Oklahoma City Tennis Center in Oklahoma City, Oklahoma. The men's and women's tournaments would not be held at the same site until 2006.

== Team tournament ==
First round
Miami (FL)	7
Pepperdine	2
Florida	5
U.S. International	4
Trinity (TX)	8
UCLA	1
Stanford	9
Harvard	0
San Diego State	6
Northwestern	3
USC	8
Arizona State	1
Oklahoma State	6
Texas	3
California	6
Arizona	3

Quarterfinals
Miami (FL)	7
Florida	2
Trinity (TX)	5
Stanford	4
San Diego State	0
USC	9
Oklahoma State	4
California	5

Semifinals
Miami (FL)	5
Trinity (TX)	4
USC	9
California	0

Championship
Miami (FL)	3
USC	6
Third place
Trinity (TX)	5
California	1

== See also ==
- NCAA Division II Tennis Championships (Men, Women)
- NCAA Division III Tennis Championships (Men, Women)
