= 2013 NCAA Division I tennis championships =

2013 NCAA Division I Tennis Championships
- Date: May 16–27, 2013
- Edition: 68th (Men), 32nd (Women)
- Location: Urbana, Illinois, United States
- Venue: (United States) Atkins Tennis Center (University of Illinois)

Champions

Men's singles
- (Slovenia) Blaž Rola (Ohio State)

Women's singles
- Nicole Gibbs (Stanford)

Men's doubles
- Jarmere Jenkins / Mac Styslinger (Virginia)

Women's doubles
- Kaitlyn Christian / Sabrina Santamaria (USC)
- NCAA Division I Tennis Championships

The 2013 NCAA Division I Tennis Championships were the men's and women's tennis tournaments played concurrently from May 16 to May 27, 2013, in Urbana, Illinois on the campus of the University of Illinois. It was the 67th edition of the NCAA Division I Men's Tennis Championship* and the 32nd edition of the NCAA Division I Women's Tennis Championship.* It was the eighth time the men's and women's tournaments were held at the same venue. It consisted of a men's and women's team, singles, and doubles championships.

The men's team championship was won by the Virginia Cavaliers, and the women's team championship was won by the Stanford Cardinal. The men's singles title was won by Blaž Rola from Ohio State, and the men's doubles title went to Jarmere Jenkins and Mac Styslinger of Virginia. The women's singles title was won by Nicole Gibbs of Stanford, her second consecutive singles championship. The women's doubles title was also won by the pair of Kaitlyn Christian and Sabrina Santamaria from USC.

== Men's team championship ==
- Note: Matches from the first round and second round were held at the home courts of the national seeds with the winning team advancing to the championship rounds in Urbana, Illinois.

=== National seeds ===
1. UCLA (Championship Round)
2. Virginia (National champions)
3. Georgia (semifinals)
4. USC (quarterfinals)
5. Ohio State (semifinals)
6. Ole Miss (second round)
7. Tennessee (quarterfinals)
8. Kentucky (Round of 16)
9. Duke (quarterfinals)
10. Mississippi State (Round of 16)
11. Pepperdine (quarterfinals)
12. Texas A&M (Round of 16)
13. Baylor (Round of 16)
14. Oklahoma (Round of 16)
15. Florida (first round)
16. Vanderbilt (Round of 16)

=== Finals bracket ===
Round of 16; May 16
1	UCLA	4
16	Vanderbilt	0
9	Duke	4
8	Kentucky	2
5	Ohio State	4
12	Texas A&M	0
13	Baylor	1
4	USC	4
3	Georgia	4
14	Oklahoma	2
11	Pepperdine	4
Memphis	2
7	Tennessee	4
10	Mississippi State	2
California	0
2	Virginia	4

Quarterfinals; May 18
1	UCLA	4
9	Duke	0
5	Ohio State	4
4	USC	3
3	Georgia	4
11	Pepperdine	2
7	Tennessee	0
2	Virginia	4

Semifinals; May 20
1	UCLA	4
5	Ohio State	3
3	Georgia	1
2	Virginia	4

Finals; May 21
1	UCLA	3
2	Virginia	4

== Women's team championship ==
- Note: Matches from the first round and second round were held at the home courts of the national seeds with the winning team advancing to the championship rounds in Urbana, Illinois.

=== National seeds ===
1. Florida (semifinals)
2. North Carolina (quarterfinals)
3. Texas A&M (Championship Round)
4. Georgia (quarterfinals)

5. USC (Round of 16)
6. Miami (FL) (quarterfinals)
7. UCLA (semifinals)
8. California (quarterfinals)

9. Alabama (Round of 16)
10. Michigan (Round of 16)
11. Northwestern (Round of 16)
12. Stanford (National champions)

13. Clemson (Round of 16)
14. Virginia (Round of 16)
15. Nebraska (Round of 16)
16. Texas Tech (second round)

=== Finals bracket ===
Round of 16; May 16
1	Florida	4
Duke	0
9	Alabama	1
8	California	4
5	USC	3
12	Stanford	4
13	Clemson	2
4	Georgia	4
3	Texas A&M	5
14	Virginia	0
11	Northwestern	3
6	Miami (FL)	4
7	UCLA	4
10	Michigan	0
15	Nebraska	1
2	North Carolina	4

Quarterfinals; May 18
1	Florida	4
8	California	2
12	Stanford	4
4	Georgia	1
3	Texas A&M	4
6	Miami (FL)	0
7	UCLA	4
2	North Carolina	1

Semifinals; May 20
1	Florida	3
12	Stanford	4
3	Texas A&M	4
7	UCLA	3

Finals; May 21
12	Stanford	4
3	Texas A&M	3

== Men's singles championship ==
- Note: Matches from all six rounds were held in Urbana, Illinois.

=== National seeds ===
1. Miķelis Lībietis, Tennessee (first round)
2. Alex Domijan, Virginia (first round)
3. Jarmere Jenkins, Virginia (Championship Round)
4. Anthony Rossi, Kentucky (second round)
5. Romain Bogaerts, Mississippi State (first round)
6. Emilio Gómez, USC (first round)
7. Peter Kobelt, Ohio State (Round of 16)
8. Henrique Cunha, Duke (quarterfinals)

Players ranked 9th–16th in no particular order

- Matija Pecotic, Princeton (second round)
- Sebastian Fanselow, Pepperdine (semifinals)
- Ray Sarmiento, USC (Round of 16)
- Nik Scholtz, Ole Miss (first round)
- Ryan Lipman, Vanderbilt (second round)
- Evan King, Michigan (quarterfinals)
- Kyle McMorrow, Washington (Round of 16)
- Blaž Rola, Ohio State (National Champion)

=== Finals bracket ===
Round of 16; May 24
A Mies (AUB)	6	6
Y Hanfmann (USC)	3	2
7	P Kobelt (OSU)	4	2
9-16	S Fanselow (PEPP)	6	6
3	J Jenkins (UVA)	7	2	6
9-16	R Sarmiento (USC)	6	6	4
M Giron (UCLA)	6	3	2
S Hess-Olesen (TEX)	3	6	6
A Sarkissian (PEPP)	6	7^{3}	2
J De Klerk (TUL)	7	6	6
9-16	E King (MICH)	6	6
A Dome (CP)	3	4
9-16	K McMorrow (WAS)	1	0
8	H Cunha (DUKE)	6	6
9-16	B Rola (OSU)	4	6	6
T Mihov (S CAR)	6	4	1

Quarterfinals; May 25
A Mies (AUB)	5	6	4
9-16	S Fanselow (PEPP)	7	3	6
3	J Jenkins (UVA)	6	6
S Hess-Olesen (TEX)	3	2
J De Klerk (TUL)	3	6	6
9-16	E King (MICH)	6	3	2
8	H Cunha (DUKE)	6	4	1
9-16	B Rola (OSU)	4	6	6

Semifinals; May 26
9-16	S Fanselow (PEPP)	6	6
3	J Jenkins (UVA)	7	7
J De Klerk (TUL)	2	3
9-16	B Rola (OSU)	6	6

Finals; May 27
3	J Jenkins (UVA)	6	4
9-16	B Rola (OSU)	7	6

== Women's singles championship ==
- Note: Matches from all six rounds were held in Urbana, Illinois.

=== National seeds ===
1. Lauren Embree, Florida (first round)
2. Sabrina Santamaria, USC (second round)
3. Robin Anderson, UCLA (Round of 16)
4. Christina Sanchez-Quintanar, Texas A&M (Round of 16)
5. Zsofi Susanyi, California (Round of 16)
6. Lauren Herring, Georgia (quarterfinals)
7. Gina Suarez-Malaguti, North Carolina (quarterfinals)
8. Anett Schutting, California (first round)

Players ranked 9th–16th in no particular order

- Danielle Lao, USC (first round)
- Petra Niedermayerova, Kansas State (Round of 16)
- Nicole Gibbs, Stanford (National Champion)
- Yana Koroleva, Clemson (quarterfinals)
- Krista Hardebeck, Stanford (Round of 16)
- Mary Weatherholt, Nebraska (Championship Round)
- Julie Elbaba, Virginia (second round)
- Sofie Oyen, Florida (first round)

=== Finals bracket ===
Round of 16; May 24
J Cako (ASU)	2	4
B Addison (TEX)	6	6
7	G Suarez-Malaguti (UNC)	6	6
9-16	P Niedermayerova (KSU)	1	1
4	C Sanchez-Quintanar, TAMU	4	4
9-16	N Gibbs (STAN)	6	6
5	Z Susanyi (CAL)	5	6
9-16	Y Koroleva (CLEM)	7	7^{6}
9-16	K Hardebeck (STAN)	0	2
6	L Herring (UGA)	6	6
9-16	M Weatherholt (NEB)	6	6	6
3	R Anderson (UCLA)	7^{4}	0	0
C Price (UNC)	2	1
N Beazant (RICE)	6	6
S Tan (TCU)	3	6	4
A Guarachi (ALA)	6	2	6

Quarterfinals; May 25
B Addison (TEX)	5	6	6
7	G Suarez-Malaguti (UNC)	7	1	4
9-16	N Gibbs (STAN)	6	6
9-16	Y Koroleva (CLEM)	1	1
6	L Herring (UGA)	2	2
9-16	M Weatherholt (NEB)	6	6
N Beazant (RICE)	4	6	1
A Guarachi (ALA)	6	1	6

Semifinals; May 26
B Addison (TEX)	1	1
9-16	N Gibbs (STAN)	6	6
9-16	M Weatherholt (NEB)	6	6
A Guarachi (ALA)	0	3

Finals; May 27
9-16	N Gibbs (STAN)	6	6
9-16	M Weatherholt (NEB)	2	4

== Men's doubles championship ==
- Note: Matches from the first round and round of 16 were also held in Urbana, Illinois on May 23 and May 24, respectively.

=== National seeds ===
1. Miķelis Lībietis / Hunter Reese, Tennessee (Round of 16)
2. Henrique Cunha / Raphael Hemmeler, Duke (semifinals)
3. Jonas Lutjen / Nik Scholtz, Ole Miss (semifinals)
4. Jarmere Jenkins / Mac Styslinger, Virginia (champions)

Players ranked 5th–8th in no particular order

- Hernus Pieters / Ben Wagland, Georgia (quarterfinals)
- Junior Ore / Jackson Withrow, Texas A&M (Round of 16)
- Jarryd Botha / David Vieyra, Alabama (Round of 16)
- Daniel Cochrane / Andreas Mies, Auburn (quarterfinals)

=== Finals bracket ===
Quarterfinals; May 25
C Camillone / D Holiner (TEX)	3	6	7
5-8	H Pieters / B Wagland (UGA)	6	4	6
3	J Lutjen / N Scholtz (MISS)	6	6
V Hundal / J Spir (GT)	2	4
B Overbeek/S Piro (FLA)	6	4
4	J Jenkins / M Styslinger (UVA)	7^{5}	6
5-8	D Cochrane / A Mies (AUB)	2	3
2	H Cunha / R Hemmeler (DUKE)	6	6

Semifinals; May 26
C Camillone / D Holiner (TEX)	6	5	6
3	J Lutjen / N Scholtz (MISS)	2	7	3
4	J Jenkins / M Styslinger (UVA)	7	6
2	H Cunha / R Hemmeler, DUKE	5	3

Final; May 27
C Camillone / D Holiner (TEX)	6	2	4
4	J Jenkins / M Styslinger (UVA)	3	6	6

== Women's doubles championship ==
- Note: Matches from the first round and round of 16 were also held in Urbana, Illinois on May 23 and May 24, respectively.

=== National seeds ===
1. Kate Fuller / Silvia Garcia, Georgia (quarterfinals)
2. Kaitlyn Christian / Sabrina Santamaria, USC (champions)
3. Patricia Veresova / Mary Weatherholt, Nebraska (quarterfinals)
4. Brynn Boren / Kata Szekely, Tennessee (semifinals)

Players ranked 5th–8th in no particular order

- Alexa Guarachi / Mary Anne Macfarlane, Alabama (semifinals)
- Emina Bektas / Brooke Bolender, Michigan (first round)
- Kristie Ahn / Nicole Gibbs, Stanford (first round)
- Hermon Brhane / Whitney Ritchie, Oklahoma (Round of 16)

=== Finals bracket ===
Quarterfinals; May 25
1	K Fuller / S Garcia (UGA)	6	5
5-8	A Guarachi / M Macfarlane, (ALA)	7^{4}	7
3	P Veresova / M Weatherholt (NEB)	4	7^{5}	6
R Anderson / S Morton (UCLA)	6	6	7^{3}
J Cako / N Smith (ASU)	2	2
4	B Boren / K Szekely (TENN)	6	6
M Kopinski / R White (ILL)	2	0
2	K Christian / S Santamaria (USC)	6	6

Semifinals; May 26
5-8	A Guarachi / M Macfarlane, (ALA)	5	4
R Anderson / S Morton (UCLA)	7	6
4	B Boren / K Szekely (TENN)	5	5
2	K Christian / S Santamaria (USC)	7	7

Final; May 27
R Anderson / S Morton (UCLA)	4	3
2	K Christian / S Santamaria (USC)	6	6
