= Tennessee Volunteers tennis =

Tennessee Volunteers tennis may refer to one of the following tennis teams at the University of Tennessee:

- Tennessee Volunteers men's tennis, the men's tennis team
- Tennessee Volunteers women's tennis, the women's tennis team
