= 1992 NCAA Division I women's tennis championships =

1992 NCAA Division I Women's Tennis Championships
- Date: May 13–17, 1992
- Edition: 11th
- Location: Stanford, California
- Venue: (United States) Stanford Tennis Stadium; Stanford University

Champions

Women's singles
- (United States) Lisa Raymond (Florida)

Women's doubles
- (United States) Mamie Ceniza / (United States) Iwalani McCalla (UCLA Bruin Women's tennis)
| ← 1991 · | NCAA Division I Women's Tennis Championships | · 1993 → |

The 1992 NCAA Division I Women's Tennis Championships were the 11th annual championships to determine the national champions of NCAA Division I women's singles, doubles, and team collegiate tennis in the United States. They were hosted by Stanford University at the Stanford Tennis Stadium in Stanford, California between May 13–17, 1992.

Florida defeated Texas, score 5–3, in the championship match, the Gators' first team national title. Florida, in turn, completed a sweep of all three national championships in women's tennis.

== Brackets ==
=== Team tournament ===
- Site: Stanford Tennis Stadium, Stanford, California

First round
USC | 6
Kentucky | 1
San Diego State | 5
Kansas | 4
William & Mary | 5
Miami (FL) | 4
San Diego | 4
Mississippi | 5

Second round
Florida | 5
USC | 0
UCLA | 5
Indiana | 1
Duke | 5
San Diego State | 1
Georgia | 5
Tennessee | 0
Arizona | 2
Arizona State | 5
William & Mary | 3
Texas | 5
Pepperdine | 2
California | 5
Mississippi | 1
Stanford | 5

Quarterfinals
Florida | 5
UCLA | 0
Duke | 5
Georgia | 3
Arizona State | 3
Texas | 5
California | 2
Stanford | 5

Semifinals
Florida | 5
Duke | 1
Texas | 5
Stanford | 3

Championship
Florida | 5
Texas | 3

== See also ==
- 1992 NCAA Division I Men's Tennis Championships – men's and women's tournaments not held at same site until 2006
- NCAA Division II Tennis Championships (Men, Women)
- NCAA Division III Tennis Championships (Men, Women)
