= 1994 NCAA Division I women's tennis championships =

1994 NCAA Division I Women's Tennis Championships
- Date: May 1994
- Edition: 13th
- Location: Athens, Georgia
- Venue: Dan Magill Tennis Complex; University of Georgia

Champions

Women's singles
- Angela Lettiere (Georgia)

Women's doubles
- Rebecca Jensen / Nora Koves (Kansas)
← 1993 ·	NCAA Division I Women's Tennis Championships	· 1995 →

The 1994 NCAA Division I Women's Tennis Championships were the 13th annual championships to determine the national champions of NCAA Division I women's singles, doubles, and team collegiate tennis in the United States, held during May 1994 in Athens, Georgia.

Hosts Georgia defeated Stanford in the team championship, 5–4, to claim their first national title.

== Host ==
This year's tournaments were hosted by the University of Georgia at the Dan Magill Tennis Complex in Athens, Georgia. This was the first time the Lady Bulldogs hosted the women's championships.

The men's and women's NCAA tennis championships would not be held jointly until 2006.

== Brackets ==
=== Team championship ===
First round
Notre Dame	5
UC Santa Barbara	3
Arizona	5
Florida State	3
Wake Forest	5
Virginia	4
USC	5
Clemson	0

Second round
Stanford	5
Notre Dame	1
Pepperdine	5
Indiana	2
Texas
Arizona
Florida	5
UCLA	2
California	5
Wake Forest	1
Kansas	5
Arizona State	4
Georgia	5
USC	2
Duke	5
Kentucky	1

Quarterfinals
Stanford	5
Pepperdine	1
Texas	6
Florida	0
California	5
Kansas	3
Georgia	5
Duke	3

Semifinals
Stanford	5
Texas	2
California	2
Georgia	5

Championship
Stanford	4
Georgia	5

== See also ==
- 1994 NCAA Division I men's tennis championships
- NCAA Division II Tennis Championships (Men, Women)
- NCAA Division III Tennis Championships (Men, Women)
