= 1991 NCAA Division I women's tennis championships =

- Date: May 11–15, 1991
- Edition: 10th
- Location: Stanford, California
- Venue: (United States) Stanford Tennis Stadium; Stanford University

Champions

Women's singles
- (United States) Sandra Birch (Stanford)

Women's doubles
- (Canada) Jillian Alexander / (United States) Nicole Arendt (Florida)
- NCAA Division I women's tennis championships

The 1991 NCAA Division I women's tennis championships were the 10th annual championships hosted by the NCAA to determine the team, singles, and doubles national champions of women's college tennis among its Division I members in the United States, held at the end of the 1991 NCAA Division I women's tennis season.

These championships were hosted by Stanford University at the Stanford Tennis Stadium in Stanford, California between May 11–15, 1991.

Stanford defeated UCLA, 5–1, in the championship match to win their eighth overall and sixth consecutive team title.

== Brackets ==
=== Team ===
First round
Ole Miss	5
San Diego	1
Miami (FL)	6
William & Mary	3
Indiana	5
LSU	3
San Diego State	5
Tennessee	1

Second round
UCLA	5
Ole Miss	1
California	5
Texas	4
Florida	5
Miami (FL)	1
Arizona State	1
Duke	5
Oklahoma State	4
Pepperdine	5
Georgia	6
Indiana	0
Arizona	7
BYU	2
Stanford	5
San Diego State	1

Quarterfinals
UCLA	5
California	2
Florida	5
Duke	1
Pepperdine	1
Georgia	5
Arizona	0
Stanford	6

Semifinals
UCLA	6
Florida	3
Georgia	1
Stanford	5

Championship
UCLA	1
Stanford	5

== See also ==
- 1991 NCAA Division I Men's Tennis Championships – the men's and women's tournaments would not be held at the same site until 2006.
- NCAA Division II Tennis Championships (Men, Women)
- NCAA Division III Tennis Championships (Men, Women)
