= 1996 NCAA Division I women's tennis championships =

1996 NCAA Division I Women's Tennis Championships
- Date: May 1996
- Edition: 15th
- Location: Tallahassee, Florida
- Venue: Scott Speicher Tennis Center; Florida State University

Champions

Women's singles
- (United States) Jill Craybas (Florida)

Women's doubles
- (United States) Dawn Buth / (United States) Stephanie Nickitas (Florida)
← 1995 ·	NCAA Division I Women's Tennis Championships	· 1997 →

The 1996 NCAA Division I Women's Tennis Championships were the 15th annual championships to determine the national champions of NCAA Division I women's singles, doubles, and team collegiate tennis in the United States.

Florida defeated Stanford in the championship final, 5–2, to claim their second national title.

== Host ==
This year's tournaments were hosted by Florida State University at the Scott Speicher Tennis Center in Tallahassee, Florida.

The men's and women's NCAA tennis championships would not be held jointly until 2006.

== Brackets ==
=== Team ===
- An asterisk indicates a team that qualified through a regional tournament.

First round
Stanford	5
*	Clemson	1
Notre Dame	5
BYU	0
Duke	5
*	USC	2
Texas	5
*	William & Mary	4
Florida	5
*	Oklahoma State	0
Wake Forest	3
Wisconsin	5
Arizona	5
*	Ole Miss	0
UCLA	5
*	Vanderbilt	3

Quarterfinals
Stanford	5
Notre Dame	1
Duke	5
Texas	4
Florida	5
Wisconsin	0
Arizona	2
UCLA	5

Semifinals
Stanford	5
Duke	2
Florida	5
UCLA	1

Championship
Stanford	2
Florida	5

== See also ==
- 1996 NCAA Division I men's tennis championships
- NCAA Division II Tennis Championships (Men, Women)
- NCAA Division III Tennis Championships (Men, Women)
