= 1998 NCAA Division I women's tennis championships =

1998 NCAA Division I Women's Tennis Championships
- Date: May 1998
- Edition: 17th
- Location: South Bend, Indiana
- Venue: Courtney Tennis Center; University of Notre Dame

Champions

Women's singles
- (Canada) Vanessa Webb (Duke)

Women's doubles
- (United States) Amanda Augustus / (United States) Amy Jensen (California)
← 1997 ·	NCAA Division I Women's Tennis Championships	· 1999 →

The 1998 NCAA Division I Women's Tennis Championships were the 17th annual championships to determine the national champions of NCAA Division I women's singles, doubles, and team collegiate tennis in the United States.

Florida defeated Duke in the team final, 5–1, to claim their third national title (and second in three years).

== Host ==
This year's tournaments were hosted by the University of Notre Dame at the Courtney Tennis Center in South Bend, Indiana.

The men's and women's NCAA tennis championships would not be held jointly until 2006.

== Brackets ==
=== Team ===
- An asterisk indicates a team that qualified through a regional tournament.

First round
Florida	5
*	Pepperdine	2
Texas	5
*	UCLA	0
California	3
*	William & Mary	5
Georgia	5
*	Kansas	3
*	Arkansas	1
Duke	5
Arizona State	1
Ole Miss	5
BYU	4
Wake Forest	5
Stanford	6
*	Tennessee	0

Quarterfinals
Florida	5
Texas	0
William & Mary	2
Georgia	5
Duke	6
Ole Miss	0
Wake Forest	2
Stanford	5

Semifinals
Florida	5
Georgia	1
Duke	5
Stanford	4

Championship
Florida	5
Duke	1

== See also ==
- 1998 NCAA Division I men's tennis championships
- NCAA Division II Tennis Championships (Men, Women)
- NCAA Division III Tennis Championships (Men, Women)
