= 1995 NCAA Division I women's tennis championships =

1995 NCAA Division I Women's Tennis Championships
- Date: May 1995
- Edition: 14th
- Location: Malibu, California
- Venue: Ralphs-Straus Tennis Center; Pepperdine University

Champions

Women's singles
- Keri Phebus (UCLA)

Women's doubles
- Keri Phebus / Susie Starrett (UCLA)
← 1994 ·	NCAA Division I Women's Tennis Championships	· 1996 →

The 1995 NCAA Division I Women's Tennis Championships were the 14th annual championships to determine the national champions of NCAA Division I women's singles, doubles, and team collegiate tennis in the United States, held during May 1995 in Malibu, California.

Texas defeated Florida in the team championship, 5–4, to claim their second national title.

== Host ==
This year's tournaments were hosted by Pepperdine University at the Ralphs-Straus Tennis Center in Malibu, California. This was the first time the Waves hosted the women's championships.

The men's and women's NCAA tennis championships would not be held jointly until 2006.

== Brackets ==
=== Team ===
First round
LSU	5
Tennessee	3
South Carolina	5
BYU	2
Pepperdine	5
Vanderbilt	1
Indiana	5
San Diego	3

Second round
Florida	5
LSU	0
California	5
William & Mary	2
Georgia	5
South Carolina	0
Duke	5
Arizona	1
Stanford	5
Pepperdine	1
UCLA	5
Wake Forest	1
Texas	5
Indiana	1
Arizona State	5
USC	2

Quarterfinals
Florida	5
California	0
Georgia	5
Duke	4
Stanford	5
UCLA	4
Texas	5
Arizona State	1

Semifinals
Florida	5
Georgia	0
Stanford	1
Texas	5

Championship
Florida	4
Texas	5

== See also ==
- 1995 NCAA Division I men's tennis championships
- NCAA Division II Tennis Championships (Men, Women)
- NCAA Division III Tennis Championships (Men, Women)
