= Texas Longhorns women's tennis =

- Founded: 1978
- University: University of Texas at Austin
- Athletic director: Chris Del Conte
- Head coach: Howard Joffe (10th season)
- Conference: SEC
- Location: Austin, Texas, US
- Home Court: Texas Tennis Center
- Nickname: Longhorns
- Colors: Burnt Orange and White

NCAA Tournament championships
- 1993, 1995, 2021, 2022

NCAA Tournament runner-up
- 1992, 2005

NCAA Tournament Semifinals
- 1990, 1992, 1993, 1994, 1995, 1997, 2005, 2021, 2022

NCAA Tournament Quarterfinals
- 1984, 1990, 1992, 1993, 1994, 1995, 1996, 1997, 1998, 2005, 2021, 2022, 2023

NCAA Tournament Round of 16
- 1996, 1997, 1998, 2000, 2001, 2002, 2005, 2008, 2010, 2012, 2016, 2018, 2021, 2022, 2023, 2024

NCAA Tournament Round of 32
- 1989, 1990, 1992, 1993, 1994, 1995, 1996, 1997, 1998, 1999, 2000, 2000, 2000, 2004, 2005, 2006, 2007, 2008, 2009, 2010, 2011, 2012, 2013, 2014, 2016, 2017, 2018, 2019, 2021, 2022, 2023, 2024

NCAA Tournament appearances
- 1983, 1984, 1985, 1986, 1987, 1988, 1989, 1990, 1991, 1992, 1993, 1994, 1995, 1996, 1997, 1998, 1999, 2000, 2001, 2002, 2003, 2004, 2005, 2006, 2007, 2008, 2009, 2010, 2011, 2012, 2013, 2014, 2016, 2017, 2018, 2019, 2021, 2022, 2023, 2024

Conference Tournament championships
- SWC; 1988, 1989, 1990, 1991, 1992, 1993, 1994, 1995, 1996 Big 12; 1997, 1998, 1999, 2000, 2001, 2002, 2005, 2012, 2013, 2018, 2021, 2022, 2023

Conference regular season champions
- SWC; 1983, 1984, 1985, 1987, 1989, 1990, 1992, 1993, 1994, 1995, 1996 Big 12; 1997, 1998, 1999, 2000, 2001, 2002, 2004, 2007, 2018, 2019, 2021, 2023

The Texas Longhorns women's tennis team represents the University of Texas at Austin in NCAA Division I intercollegiate women's tennis competition. The Longhorns competed in the Big 12 Conference through the 2024 season and moved to the Southeastern Conference (SEC) on July 1, 2024.

The team began play in 1978, and since then has won four NCAA Championships (1993, 1995, 2021, and 2022), 23 regular-season conference titles (three shared), 11 Big 12 tournaments, and all nine SWC tournament championships. The Longhorns were also the NCAA runner-up in 1992 and 2005.

== Head coach ==
#	Coach	Years	Seasons	Overall			Conference		
#	Coach	Years	Seasons	Won	Lost	%	Won	Lost	%
1	Cathy Beene	1979	1	16	9	.640			
2	Dave Woods	1980–1982	3	52	24	.684			
3	Jeff Moore	1983–2005	23	506	153	.768	197	9	.956
4	Patty Fendick-McCain	2006–2014	9	157	83	.654	78	15	.839
5	Danielle McNamara	2015–2015	1	10	11	.476	6	3	.667
6	Howard Joffe	2016–present	6	110	35	.759	40	7	.851
Total			41	812	302	.729	313	33	.905

== Yearly Record ==
Legend
National champions
Conference champions
Conference Tournament Champions

Season	Coach	Record		Conference Standing	Conference Tournament	ITA Rank	Notes
Season	Coach	Overall	Conference	Conference Standing	Conference Tournament	ITA Rank	Notes
Independent
1979	Cathy Beene	16–9	–				
1980	Dave Woods	14–8	–				
1981	Dave Woods	19–8	–				
1982	Dave Woods	19–8	–				
Southwest Conference
1983	Jeff Moore	22–10	8–0	1st		9	First Round
1984	Jeff Moore	29–7	8–0	1st		5	Quarterfinals
1985	Jeff Moore	24–3	8–0	1st		4	First Round
1986	Jeff Moore	11–12	7–1	3rd		13	First Round
1987	Jeff Moore	18–8	7–1	1st		12	First Round
1988	Jeff Moore	16–11	7–1	T-1st	Champion	18	First Round
1989	Jeff Moore	19–8	8–0	1st	Champion	9	Second Round
1990	Jeff Moore	26–5	8–0	1st	Champion	T-4	Semifinals
1991	Jeff Moore	23–5	7–1	2nd	Champion	6	First Round
1992	Jeff Moore	25–3	7–0	1st	Champion	2	Runner-Up
1993	Jeff Moore	25–4	7–0	1st	Champion	1	Champion
1994	Jeff Moore	25–1	7–0	1st	Champion	2	Semifinals
1995	Jeff Moore	26–3	7–0	1st	Champion	1	Champion
1996	Jeff Moore	22–6	7–0	1st	Champion	T-7	Quarterfinals
Big 12 Conference
1997	Jeff Moore	24–6	11–0	1st	Champion	4	Semifinals
1998	Jeff Moore	23–6	11–0	1st	Champion	5	Quarterfinals
1999	Jeff Moore	21–7	11–0	1st	Champion	9	Second Round
2000	Jeff Moore	24–6	11–0	1st	Champion	8	Round of 16
2001	Jeff Moore	21–9	10–1	T-1st	Champion	13	Round of 16
2002	Jeff Moore	23–6	11–0	1st	Champion	10	Round of 16
2003	Jeff Moore	11–15	8–3	3rd		33	First Round
2004	Jeff Moore	23–6	11–0	1st		12	Second Round
2005	Jeff Moore	25–6	10–1	2nd	Champion	3	Runner-Up
2006	Patty Fendick-McCain	18–12	9–2	T-2nd		19	Second Round
2007	Patty Fendick-McCain	16–10	10–1	T-1st		27	Second Round
2008	Patty Fendick-McCain	20–7	10–1	2nd		15	Round of 16
2009	Patty Fendick-McCain	17–8	10–1	2nd		16	Second Round
2010	Patty Fendick-McCain	19–6	10–1	2nd		16	Round of 16
2011	Patty Fendick-McCain	17–8	9–2	2nd		23	Second Round
2012	Patty Fendick-McCain	19–8	7–2	2nd	Champion	10	Round of 16
2013	Patty Fendick-McCain	18–11	7–2	T-2nd	Champion	17	Second Round
2014	Patty Fendick-McCain	13–13	6–3	T-3rd		22	Second Round
2015	Danielle McNamara	10–11	6–3	T-3rd		37	
2016	Howard Joffe	16–9	6–3	T-2nd		20	Round of 16
2017	Howard Joffe	14–9	6–3	4th			Second Round
2018	Howard Joffe	24–5	9–0	1st	Champion		Round of 16
2019	Howard Joffe	19–5	9–0	1st			Second Round
2020	Howard Joffe	11–3	Season canceled due to the Coronavirus Pandemic				
2021	Howard Joffe	31–1	9-0	1st	Champion	1st	Champion
2022	Howard Joffe	26–4	8-1	2nd	Champion	1st	Champion
2023	Howard Joffe	24–5	8-1	T-1st	Champion	7th	Quarterfinals
2024	Howard Joffe	23–6	12-1	2nd		11th	Round of 16
Southeastern Conference
2025	Howard Joffe	0–0	0–0				
Total		866–307	SWC: 103–4; Big 12: 227–30; SEC: 0–0				

== Conference Singles Champions ==
=== Big 12 ===
Year	Name	Position
2000	Vladka Uhilrova	#3 Singles
2000	Joanne Masongsong	#4 Singles
2002	Vladka Uhilrova	#1 Singles
2002	Rebekah Forney	#4 Singles
2002	Michelle Krinke	co-#6 Singles
2005	Petra Dizdar	co-#1 Singles
2005	Ristine Olson	#3 Singles
2008	Courtney Zauft	#2 Singles
2009	Krista Damico	#3 Singles
2009	Maggie Mello	co-#4 Singles
2009	Sarah Lancaster	#5 Singles
2010	Krista Damico	co-#3 Singles
2010	Sarah Lancaster	#5 Singles
2012	Cierra Gaytan-Leach	co-#4 Singles
2012	Lina Padegimaite	#5 Singles
2012	Elizabeth Begley	#6 Singles
2013	Breunna Addison	#2 Singles
2013	Elizabeth Begley	#4 Singles
2014	Breunna Addison	#1 Singles
2014	Neda Koprčina	co-#4 Singles
2014	Pippa Horn	#5 Singles
2019	Anna Turati	#2 Singles
2019	Petra Granic	#3 Singles
2019	Katie Poluta	co-#6 Singles
2022	Peyton Stearns	#1 Singles
2022	Kylie Collins	#2 Singles
2022	Charlotte Chavatipon	#4 Singles

== Conference Doubles Champions ==
=== Big 12 ===
Year	Name	Position
2002	Kaycie Smashey / Lindsay Blau	#2 Doubles
2004	Petra Dizdar / Mia Marovic	#2 Doubles
2005	Petra Dizdar / Mia Marovic	co-#2 Doubles
2010	Amanda Craddock / Krista Damico	#2 Doubles
2011	Juliana Gajic / Maggie Mello	#3 Doubles
2022	Peyton Stearns / Allura Zamarripa	#1 Doubles
2022	Kylie Collins / Charlotte Chavatipon	#2 Doubles

== See also ==
- Texas Longhorns men's tennis
