= 1997 NCAA Division I women's tennis championships =

1997 NCAA Division I Women's Tennis Championships
- Date: May 1997
- Edition: 16th
- Location: Stanford, California
- Venue: Taube Tennis Center; Stanford University

Champions

Women's singles
- (United States) Lilia Osterloh (Stanford)

Women's doubles
- (United States) Dawn Buth / (United States) Stephanie Nickitas (Florida)
← 1996 ·	NCAA Division I Women's Tennis Championships	· 1998 →

The 1997 NCAA Division I Women's Tennis Championships were the 16th annual championships to determine the national champions of NCAA Division I women's singles, doubles, and team collegiate tennis in the United States.

Stanford defeated defending champions Florida in the team final, 5–1, to claim their ninth national title.

== Host ==
This year's tournaments were hosted by Stanford University at the Taube Tennis Center in Stanford, California.

The men's and women's NCAA tennis championships would not be held jointly until 2006 (also held at Stanford).

== Brackets ==
=== Team ===
- An asterisk indicates a team that qualified through a regional tournament.

First round
Florida	5
*	Michigan	0
Arizona State	5
*	Ole Miss	1
*	Tennessee	0
UCLA	5
Arizona	0
Texas	5
Duke	5
*	Pepperdine	0
California	5
Wake Forest	2
Georgia	0
*	William & Mary	5
*	Wisconsin	0
Stanford	5

Quarterfinals
Florida	5
Arizona State	1
UCLA	2
Texas	5
Duke	5
California	0
William & Mary	0
Stanford	6

Semifinals
Florida	5
Texas	1
Duke	1
Stanford	5

Championship
Florida	1
Stanford	5

== See also ==
- 1997 NCAA Division I men's tennis championships
- NCAA Division II Tennis Championships (Men, Women)
- NCAA Division III Tennis Championships (Men, Women)
