= Silvia García Polanco =

Dominican lawyer and politician

President of the Central American Parliament
- In office 28 October 2023 – 28 October 2024
- Preceded by: Amado Cerrud
- Succeeded by: Carlos Hernández Castillo

Personal details
- Party: Dominican Revolutionary Party
- Education: O&M College; Universidad Autónoma de Santo Domingo

Silvia García Polanco is a Dominican politician and lawyer. She served as President of the Central American Parliament between 2023 and 2024.

== Career ==
García obtained a PhD in Law from O&M College and a master’s degree in Law and International Relations from Universidad Autónoma de Santo Domingo. She is a member of the Dominican Revolutionary Party, where she has served as Secretary for International Relations since June 2023.

She has also worked in the media as a presenter and journalist on the programme En Comentarios on Radio Universal and as a producer and presenter of the television programme Silvia en Perspectiva on Teleradio America for the past five years.

=== Member of the Central American Parliament ===
She was elected to the Central American Parliament in 2010 Dominican Republic parliamentary election and has been re-elected ever since, forming part of the Central Democratic Integration Parliamentary Group (GPICD). She served as Vice-President of the Parliament between 2012 and 2013, and between 2018 and 2019, and chaired the Committee on Women, Children and the Family between 2016 and 2017, and between 2022 and 2023.

On 23 October 2023, she was elected in the second round as the first Dominican woman to serve as President of Parliament. She was sworn in on 28 October, succeeding Amado Cerrud.

In 2024, she was recognised for her work in promoting Central American integration and regional cooperation. She was succeeded by Carlos Hernández Castillo on 28 October 2024.
