= 2012 NCAA Division I tennis championships =

2012 NCAA Division I Tennis Championships
- Date: May 23–28, 2012
- Edition: 67th (Men), 31st (Women)
- Location: Athens, Georgia, United States
- Venue: (United States) Dan Magill Tennis Complex (University of Georgia)

Champions

Men's singles
- Steve Johnson (USC)

Women's singles
- Nicole Gibbs (Stanford)

Men's doubles
- Chase Buchanan / (Slovenia) Blaz Rola (Ohio State)

Women's doubles
- Mallory Burdette / Nicole Gibbs (Stanford)
← 2011 ·	NCAA Division I Tennis Championships	· 2013 →

The 2012 NCAA Division I Tennis Championships were the men's and women's tennis tournaments played concurrently from May 23 to May 28, 2012 in Athens, Georgia on the campus of the University of Georgia. It was the 67th edition of the NCAA Division I Men's Tennis Championship and the 31st edition of the NCAA Division I Women's Tennis Championship. It was the seventh time the men's and women's tournaments were held at the same venue. It consisted of a men's and women's team, singles, and doubles championships.

The men's team championship was won by the USC Trojans, and the women's team championship was won by the Florida Gators. The men's singles title was won by Steve Johnson from USC, and the men's doubles title went to Chase Buchanan and Blaz Rola of Ohio State. The women's singles title was won by Nicole Gibbs of Stanford, and the women's doubles title was also won by Nicole Gibbs, along with partner Mallory Burdette, from Stanford.

== Women's championship ==
The sixth ranked Florida defeated UCLA 4–0 to win the national title. Nicole Gibbs and the team of Mallory Burdette and Nicole Gibbs from Stanford University won the singles and doubles title respectively.
