= Oklahoma State Cowgirls tennis =

American college tennis team

- University: Oklahoma State University
- Head coach: Katarina Adamovic (1st season)
- Conference: Big 12
- Location: Stillwater, Oklahoma, US
- Home Court: Greenwood Tennis Center
- Nickname: Cowgirls
- Colors: Orange and black

NCAA Tournament runner-up
- 2016

NCAA Tournament Semifinals
- 2016

NCAA Tournament Quarterfinals
- 1985, 1986, 1989, 2016, 2017, 2025

NCAA Tournament Round of 16
- 1982, 1983, 1984, 1985, 1986, 1987, 1988, 1989, 1990, 1991, 1996, 2015, 2016, 2017, 2019, 2022, 2024, 2025

NCAA Tournament Round of 32
- 1982, 1983, 1984, 1985, 1986, 1987, 1988, 1989, 1990, 1991, 1996, 2001, 2013, 2014, 2015, 2016, 2017, 2018, 2019, 2022, 2023, 2024, 2025

NCAA Tournament appearances
- 1982, 1983, 1984, 1985, 1986, 1987, 1988, 1989, 1990, 1991, 1996, 2001, 2003, 2012, 2013, 2014, 2015, 2016, 2017, 2018, 2019, 2021, 2022, 2023, 2024, 2025

Conference Tournament championships
- Big Eight; 1981, 1982, 1983, 1984, 1985, 1986, 1987, 1988, 1989, 1990, 1991 Big 12; 2003, 2016, 2024

Conference regular season champions
- Big Eight; 1981, 1982, 1983, 1984, 1985, 1986, 1987, 1988, 1989, 1990, 1991 Big 12; 2001, 2016, 2017, 2024*, 2025 *vacated by NCAA

The Oklahoma State Cowgirls tennis team represents the Oklahoma State University in NCAA Division I college tennis as a member of the Big 12 Conference and plays its home matches at the Greenwood Tennis Center. The Cowgirls are currently led by 1st year head coach, Katarina Adamovic.

The Cowgirls have made 26 appearances in the NCAA Championship, earning a runner–up finish in 2016. In 2024, Oklahoma State won the ITA Indoor National Championship over Michigan, 4–3, though this title was later vacated by the NCAA. The program has also claimed 29 conference titles.

== History ==
Oklahoma State's first season came in 1978, when the team beat Tulsa 6–3 in the school's first match. Two years later, the Cowgirls would earn their first Big Eight conference championship in 1981, going 29–2 to claim the title. Oklahoma State would earn the program's first NCAA Championship bid a year later, in 1982. Oklahoma State would continue to dominate the Big Eight throughout the 80's and into the 90's, winning 11 straight regular season and tournament titles from 1981–1991 to bring in a total of 22 conference championships.

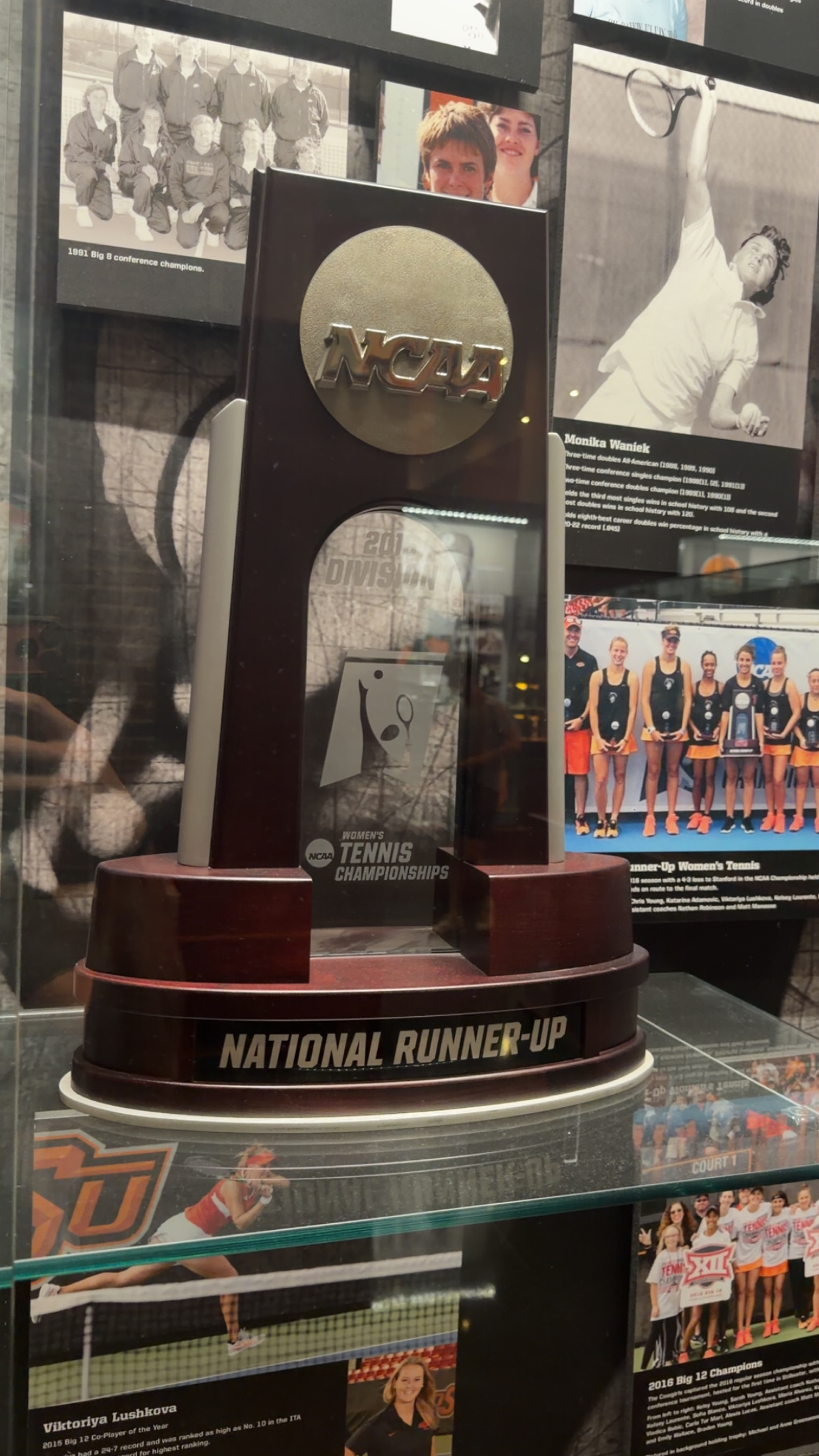
2016 NCAA Runner-Up Trophy awarded to Oklahoma State

The Cowgirls would pick up their first Big 12 conference titles in 2001 and 2003, but struggled to maintain success until the hiring of Chris Young in 2010. Oklahoma State would have arguably their greatest season in 2016, going 29–5, winning both the Big 12 regular season and conference tournament championships, and making it all the way to the NCAA national championship match against Stanford, where they fell 4–3. The Cowgirls would follow up with a successful 2017 season, winning the Big 12 regular season title and making it to the quarterfinal round of the NCAA Championship.

Oklahoma State would again find dominance in 2024, winning the ITA Indoor National Championship 4–3 over Michigan and receiving the program's first #1 ranking in the ITA national rankings. The Cowgirls would go undefeated in the regular season, easily winning another Big 12 regular season title before going on to win the Big 12 tournament title over Texas, 4—0. At the NCAA Championship, Oklahoma State would notch victories over Fairfield and SMU before falling in the Round of 16 to Tennessee, ending their season at 29–1 and receiving a final ITA ranking of 2nd. In July 2025, the NCAA announced penalties for recruiting violations committed during the 2024 season, which included three years of probation and vacating wins, including the ITA Indoor National Championship title and Big 12 regular season title.

The Cowgirls would rebound with a successful year in 2025, earning a share of the Big 12 regular season title before going on to defeat in-state rivals Tulsa and Oklahoma at the NCAA Championship to reach the Round of 16. Following a close win over Stanford, Oklahoma State would reach the quarterfinal round for the sixth time in program history, where a loss to Michigan would end the Cowgirls' season.

== Honors ==
=== All-Americans ===
Oklahoma State has produced 29 All–Americans, including Viktoriya Lushkov, the program's first three–time All–American. Most recently, Rose Marie Nijkamp and Anastasiya Komar won the honor in 2025.

=== Big 12 Player of the Year ===
- Maria Phillips (2001)
- Viktoriya Lushkova (2015)
- Bunyawi Thamchaiwat (2021)
- Ange Oby Kajuru (2024)

=== Big 12 Coach of the Year ===
- Julius Lubicz-Majewski (2001)
- Chris Young (2016, 2024)

== Greenwood Tennis Center ==
Located just north of Boone Pickens Stadium, the 50,000 square foot tennis center is an indoor facility that houses six tennis courts, along with coaches’ offices, locker rooms, and a sports medicine hub complete with a hydrotherapy center. The outdoor capacity seats around 1,000 spectators, while the indoor facilities are able to seat at least 350. Being one of the top tennis facilities in the country, the Greenwood Tennis Center has hosted the 2016 and 2024 Big 12 Championships, 2021 ITA Indoor National Championships, and 2024 NCAA Championships.
