= Georgia Bulldogs women's tennis =

University of Georgia team

- Founded: 1974
- Athletic director: Josh Brooks
- Head coach: Drake Bernstein (3rd season)
- Conference: SEC
- Location: Athens, GA
- Nickname: Georgia Bulldogs
- Colors: Red and black

NCAA Tournament championships
- 1994, 2000, 2025

NCAA Tournament runner-up
- 1987, 2019, 2024

NCAA Tournament appearances
- 39 (1987, 1988, 1989, 1990, 1991, 1992, 1993, 1994, 1995, 1996, 1997, 1998, 1999, 2000, 2001, 2002, 2003, 2004, 2005, 2006, 2007, 2008, 2009, 2010, 2011, 2012, 2013, 2014, 2015, 2016, 2017, 2018, 2019, 2021, 2022, 2023, 2024, 2025)

Conference Tournament championships
- 12 (1983, 1994, 2001, 2007, 2008, 2009, 2014, 2019, 2021, 2023, 2024, 2025)

Conference regular season champions
- 10 (1983, 1989, 1990, 1994, 2000, 2002, 2009, 2013, 2021, 2024-tie )

The Georgia Bulldogs women's tennis team represents the University of Georgia in NCAA Division I college tennis. The team is part of the Southeastern Conference and plays home matches at the Dan Magill Tennis Complex. As of the end of the 2025 season, Georgia has won three NCAA singles championships, 10 SEC regular season titles, 12 SEC tournament titles, six ITA indoor team titles (1994, 1995, 2002, 2019, 2025 and 206), and three national team championships.

Former Georgia men's tennis national champion Drake Bernstein was promoted from assistant head coach to head coach in 2024 after the retirement of long-time coach Jeff Wallace. In 2025, Bernstein's second year in charge of the program, he was voted as SEC Coach of the Year and his team won the NCAA team championship.

== Head coaches ==
Women's Tennis Head coaches of the Bulldogs.

No.	Name	Seasons	Total Seasons	SEC Champs	SEC Tourney Champs	National Champs	SEC Wins	SEC Losses	SEC Pct.	Total Wins	Total Losses	Win Pct.
1	Jane Kuykendoll	1974-1977	4	-	-	-	-	-	-	55	16	.775
2	Greg McGarity	1978-1981	4	-	-	-	5	3	.625	51	44	.537
3	Lee Myers	1982-1983	2	1	1	-	16	3	.842	40	14	.741
4	Cissie Donigan	1984-1985	2	-	-	-	13	6	.684	34	29	.540
5	Jeff Wallace	1986-2023	38	8	9	2	347	66	.840	818	203	.801
6	Drake Bernstein	2024 - Present	2	1	2	1	25	3	.893	40	14	.741

== See also ==
- Category:Georgia Bulldogs women's tennis players (23)
