= Clemson Tigers women's tennis =

- University: Clemson University
- Head coach: Nancy Harris (15th season)
- Conference: ACC
- Location: Clemson, SC
- Home Court: Hoke Sloan Tennis Center (Capacity: 1,000)
- Nickname: Clemson Tigers
- Colors: Orange and regalia

NCAA Tournament appearances
- 1982, 1983, 1984, 1986, 1993, 1994, 1996, 1998, 2000, 2002, 2003, 2004, 2005, 2006, 2007, 2008, 2009, 2010, 2011, 2012, 2013, 2014, 2015, 2016

Conference Tournament championships
- 1982, 1983, 1984, 1985, 1986, 1987, 2004, 2008

Conference regular season champions
- 1978,1979,1980,1982 1983, 1985, 1986, 2004, 2007, 2014

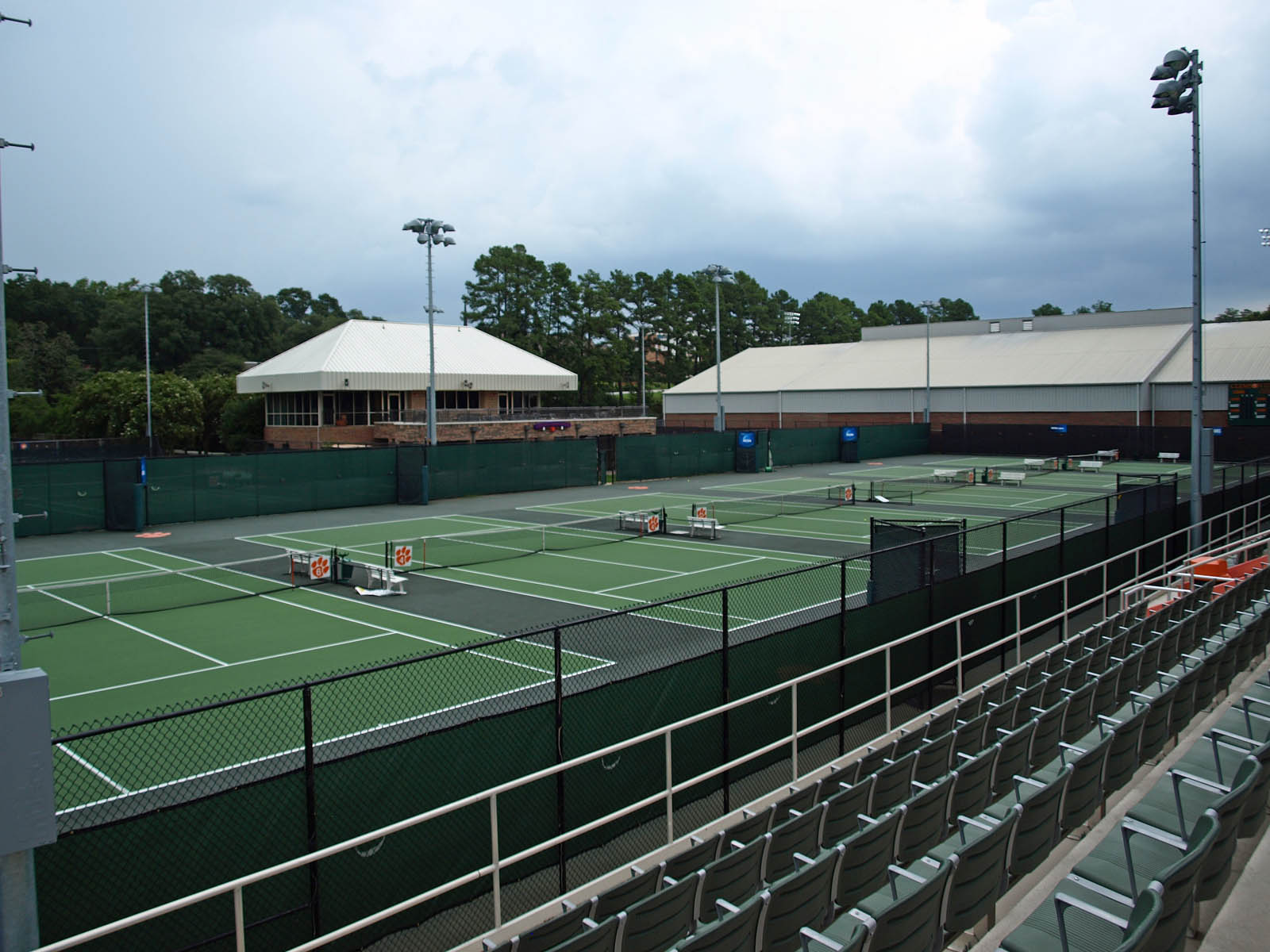
Hoke Sloan Tennis Center, the home courts of the Clemson Tigers women's tennis team.

The Clemson Tigers women's tennis team represents Clemson University in NCAA Division I college tennis. The Tigers are members of the Atlantic Coast Conference. The team is currently coached by Nancy Harris, who is on her 15th season in Clemson. Home games are played in the Hoke Sloan Tennis Center in Clemson, South Carolina. The team has won 9 ACC championships since the program started and earned 18 NCAA Tournament bids. The Tigers finished a season among the top 25 teams in the nation 24 times.

== History ==
On September 7, 1975, Clemson Athletics officials announced the start of the women's tennis program that would first start in the spring of 1976. The Lady Tigers played their first dual match on March 10 in Atlanta, Georgia, and captured a win against Georgia State 9–0. In May 1977 the Tigers finished the season ranked 9th in the country. Mary Kennerty King was the first coach of the program; she also served as a Clemson women's basketball coach for one season. In June 1978 Susan Hill, a freshman member of the team was named All-American and ACC Player of the Year, becoming the first Lady Tiger tennis player to get these awards. In October 1981 in Durham, North Carolina, the team won the first ACC Championship in the school's history. Since the program started the Tigers have won 9 ACC Championships and had 21 All-American players.

== Coaching history ==
- Mary Kennerty King (1976–1982)- First coach of the Clemson women's tennis program. Under her guidance Tigers compiled a 133–47 record with a .739 winning percentage.
- Andy Johnston (1983–1997) Captured a winning record of 254–160, which makes him the winningest coach in the program history. He led the team to five consecutive ACC Titles (1983–1987). He is currently working as an Associate Athletic Director in Football Operations at Clemson Tigers football team.

Current staff

- Nancy Harris (1997–present) She is currently serving her 15th season in Clemson. Has a winning record of 238-129 in Clemson. Led the team to ACC Championship Titles in 2004 and 2008. Coached Julie Coin who later beat number 1 in the world Ana Ivanovic at 2008 US Open.
- Scott Kidd (2011–present)- Is on his second season as an assistant coach in Clemson. Before Clemson he was a head coach of both women's and men's teams in a NAIA school Auburn University-Montgomery. He was named a NAIA Coach of the Year five times and won a total of 6 NAIA National Championships.
- Gui Jasmin (2012–present) Volunteer assistant coach, on his first season in Clemson. Former player from Brazil. Studied in University of West Florida, where he also spent two years as an assistant coach of both men's and women's tennis teams.
- Josh Hudak – Graduate assistant strength and conditioning coach.
- Kenneth Long – Student manager
- Monica Lopes – Graduate Athletic Trainer

== Hall of fame ==
Former standout players

- Susan Hill (1978–1981) was named All-American three times in singles (1978, 1979, 1980). Four-time ACC Player-of-the-year, four time ACC Flight 1 champion. Lost only one ACC match in her entire college career and still holds the highest winning percentage in Clemson history (.863, with 126 wins and 20 losses). Clemson Hall of Fame Inductee (1986).
- Julie Coin (2002–2005) is a French professional tennis player, who graduated from Clemson with a degree in mathematics. She was a three-time ITF All-American at Clemson and ACC Player of the Year in 2004. Her best accomplishment in the career so far was the win over number one in the world Ana Ivanovic.
- Ani Mijačika (2006–2009) is a Croatian professional tennis player, who also studied in Clemson, but left after her junior year to go professional. While in Clemson she earned a spot on the 2007 All-ACC team and was named the Freshman of the Year. The only player in the history of Clemson tennis to achieve number 1 ranking in the nation.
- Jane Forman (1981–1984) 1982, 1983 and 1984 All-American (singles). With a highest final singles ranking of No. 10. Clemson Hall of Fame Inductee (2003).
- Gigi Fernández (1983) first Clemson player to reach finals of a national singles tournament. 1992 and 1996 Olympic Gold Medalist in doubles. Eight time doubles Grand Slam champion. Clemson Hall of Fame Inductee (2005).

== Current players ==
Josipa Bek

Born on Jan 27, 1988 in Osijek Croatia. Senior, majoring in Management. Reached a career high ranking of No. 8 in singles and No. 1 in doubles, partnering Keri Wong. Won her 100th career match in the match against Florida State University. Won her 106th doubles match in 2012, setting a new school record. Has 29 3-set match wins, which is the most 3-set wins in school history. Three-times All-American in singles and three times All-American in doubles. Runner up of the NCAA Doubles Championship in doubles in 2010. Before coming to Clemson played on professionally, reaching a ranking of No. 549 in singles and No. 277 in doubles.

Keri Wong

Born on Dec 25, 1989 in Jackson, Mississippi. Senior, majoring in Management. Reached a career high ranking of No. 32 in singles and No. 1 in doubles partnering Josipa Bek. Doubles All-American (2009, 2011). Was an All-ACC Selection twice in her career. Before coming to Clemson competed in the junior ITF circuit, reaching career high ranking of No. 379.

Nelly Ciolkowski

Born on Jun 11, 1990 in Neuilly-Plaisance, France. Senior, majoring in Management. Reached Finals of ITACarolina Region Singles Finals. Competed in the World University Games representing France also competed for France in Master'U BNP Paribas tournament, winning all of her singles matches for her home country.

Monika Kochanová

Born on February 16, 1989, form Bratislava, Slovakia. Sophomore, majoring in Parks Recreation and Tourism Management. Was red-shirted her freshman year. Before coming to Clemson played professionally and reached a career high ranking of No. 482 in singles and No. 323 in doubles.

Klara Vyskocilova

Born on August 4, 1990, from Klatovy, Czech Republic. Sophomore, majoring in Financial Management. Ranked among the top 50 players nationally in the Czech Republic. Currently ranked in top 100 among US college tennis players.

Yana Koroleva

Born on December 18, 1992, from Moscow, Russia. Freshman, majoring in Communication Studies. Before coming to Clemson played professionally, reaching a career high ranking of No. 385 in singles and No. 759 in doubles.

Beatrice Gumulya

Freshman from Jakarta, Indonesia. Prior coming to Clemson played professionally and reached a ranking of No. 755 in singles and No. 355 in doubles. Has a sister who is a professional tennis player- Sandy Gumulya

Romy Koelzer

Born on August 22, 1991. Freshman from Betzdorf, Germany, majoring in Communication Studies. Ranked in the top 50 of the German women's open division.

== All-Americans ==
Former Tiger Julie Coin

Nineteen different All-Americans have been a part of the Tiger program.

- Susan Hill (1978, 1979, 1980-singles)
- Jane Forman (1982, 1983, 1984-singles)
- Gigi Fernández (1983-singles)
- Nicole Stafford (1985-singles, 1987-doubles)
- Cathy Hoffer (1986-singles)
- Ingelise Driehuis (1986-singles, 1987-doubles)
- Boba Tzvetkova (1994-singles)
- Shannon King (1994-doubles)
- Janice Durden (1994-doubles)
- Sophie Woorons (1996-singles and doubles)
- Jan Barrett (1996-doubles)
- Julie Coin (2004-singles, 2005-singles and doubles)
- Alix Lacelarie (2005-doubles)
- Frederica Van Adrichem (2007-doubles)
- Ani Mijacika (2007-doubles, 2008, 2009-singles and doubles)
- Carol Salge (2008-doubles)
- Josipa Bek (2009, 2010, 2011-singles and doubles)
- Ina Hadziselimovic (2009, 2010-doubles)
- Keri Wong (2009, 2011-doubles)
