= Ole Miss Rebels tennis =

- University: University of Mississippi
- Head coach: Men's: Jake Jacoby (1st year); Women's: Grant Roberts (1st year)
- Conference: SEC
- Location: University, Mississippi, US
- Home Court: Palmer/Salloum Tennis Center
- Nickname: Rebels
- Colors: Cardinal red and navy blue

NCAA Tournament runner-up
- Men's team: 1995; Women's team

NCAA Tournament appearances
- Men's team: 1989; 1992; 1994; 1995; 1996; 1997; 1998; 1999; 2000; 2001; 2002; 2003; 2004; 2005; 2006; 2007; 2008; 2009; 2010; 2011; 2012; 2013; 2014; 2015; 2016; 2017; 2018; 2019; 2021; Women's team: 1982; 1991; 1992; 1993; 1996; 1997; 1998; 1999; 2000; 2001; 2002; 2005; 2009; 2010; 2011; 2012; 2013; 2014; 2015; 2016; 2017; 2018; 2021

Conference Tournament championships
- Men's team: 1996; 2005; 2009; Women's team: 1982; 1999; 2005

Conference regular season champions
- Men's team: 1996; 1997; 2004; 2005; 2009; Women's team: 1998

The Ole Miss Rebels tennis program represents the University of Mississippi in both men's and women's NCAA Division I Southeastern Conference play.

== 2009 ==
=== Ole Miss men's tennis team ===
Ole Miss men’s tennis head coach Billy Chadwick was named both the SEC Coach Of the Year and the USPTA National College Coach of the Year.

Ole Miss men’s tennis freshman Devin Britton was named the Southeast Region Rookie of the Year by the Intercollegiate Tennis Association (ITA).

Ole Miss men’s tennis team finished the 2009 season atop the second annual ITA Attendance Race standings for regular season home matches. Ole Miss drew 5,550 fans to its matches this season. Ole Miss also finished atop the race standings in average attendance. The Rebels drew an average of 617 fans for its nine home matches. The Rebels were also able to post five of the top eight single match totals on the season.

Ole Miss men's tennis team won the SEC regular season for the fifth time in the history of the program, repeated as SEC tournament Champion, captured their eighth straight SEC West title and reached the NCAA Elite Eight for the ninth time.

==== NCAA tournament ====
Ole Miss, going into the tournament as the #2 seed, defeated Alcorn State University 4–0 in the first round and LSU 4–2 in the second round to advance to the Sweet Sixteen where they played, and defeated 4–1, host Texas A&M University in the first round at College Station, Texas. The wins against Alcorn State, LSU and Texas A&M extended the Rebels win streak to 20 straight matches. The win over Texas A&M helped the Rebels advance to the Elite Eight, also held at College Station, Texas, where they met #7 seed UCLA on May 16, 2009. UCLA won 4–3, ending the Rebels season with a school record 27 wins to only 3 losses.

==== Men's singles competition ====
Ole Miss freshman Devin Britton made history becoming the first Rebel to reach the NCAA men’s singles championship match and becoming the first Rebel to ever win an NCAA men's singles championship. Britton defeated Moritz Baumann of Wisconsin in the first round then beat Dominic Inglot of Virginia in the second round. In the third round, Britton sent Rice senior Bruno Rosa out of the tournament in straight sets, and then he beat Stanford’s Alex Clayton in the quarterfinals. To advance to the NCAA championship match, he defeated Blake Strode of Arkansas with a straight set win. To win the championship, Britton defeated Ohio State senior Steven Moneke.

=== Ole Miss women's tennis team ===
The Ole Miss women's tennis team were chosen to participate in the 2009 NCAA Tennis Championships tournament. The Rebels, as the No. 2 seed in the regional, defeated the University of Denver 4–1 in the first round and lost to host Georgia Tech Yellow Jackets 4–1 in the second round, ending the Rebels' season with a 15–10 record.

== See also ==
- University of Mississippi
- Ole Miss Rebels
