= 2017 Citi Open – Women's doubles =

Women's doubles
- 2017 Citi Open

Final
- Champions: (Japan) Shuko Aoyama (Czech Republic) Renata Voráčová
- Runners-up: (Canada) Eugenie Bouchard (United States) Sloane Stephens
- Score: 6–3, 6–2

Details
- Draw: 15
- Seeds: 4

Events
Singles	men	women
Doubles	men	women
- Citi Open

Monica Niculescu and Yanina Wickmayer were the defending doubles champions, but Wickmayer chose not to participate this year. Niculescu played alongside Sania Mirza, but lost in the semifinals to Eugenie Bouchard and Sloane Stephens.

The second-seeded team of Shuko Aoyama and Renata Voráčová won the title, defeating Bouchard and Stephens in the final, 6–3, 6–2.

== Seeds ==
The top seed received a bye into the quarterfinals.

1. (India) Sania Mirza / (Romania) Monica Niculescu (semifinals)
2. (Japan) Shuko Aoyama / (Czech Republic) Renata Voráčová (champions)
3. (Colombia) Mariana Duque Mariño / (Argentina) María Irigoyen (first round)
4. (Greece) Valentini Grammatikopoulou / (Japan) Nao Hibino (first round)

== Draw ==
Key

- Q = Qualifier
- WC = Wild card
- LL = Lucky loser
- Alt = Alternate
- ITF = ITF entry
- PR = Protected ranking
- SR = Special ranking
- SE = Special exempt
- JE = Junior exempt
- JR = Junior Accelerator Programme entrant
- CO = College Accelerator Programme entrant
- NG = Next Gen Accelerator Program entrant
- w/o = Walkover
- r = Retired
- d = Defaulted

First round
(United States) J Loeb (United States) A Weinhold	6	2
(Netherlands) C Ewijk (Netherlands) R van der Hoek	2	0^{r}
3	(Colombia) M Duque Mariño (Argentina) M Irigoyen	6	3	[6]
(Canada) E Bouchard (United States) S Stephens	2	6	[10]
WC	(United States) S Morton (United States) A Smith	1	4
(Uzbekistan) N Abduraimova (Romania) PM Țig	6	6
(Canada) B Andreescu (United States) L Chirico	6	7^{7}
(United States) K Christian (United States) D Krawczyk	3	6^{5}
(Australia) J Moore (United Kingdom) J Rae	6	6^{6}	[10]
4	(Greece) V Grammatikopoulou (Japan) N Hibino	3	7^{8}	[6]
(Germany) S Lisicki (France) K Mladenovic	6^{1}	1
(Sweden) C Lister (China) Jia Lu	7^{7}	6
(United States) S Chang (United States) A Mueller	6	1	[6]
2	(Japan) S Aoyama (Czech Republic) R Voráčová	4	6	[10]

Quarterfinals
1	(India) S Mirza (Romania) M Niculescu	6	6
(United States) J Loeb (United States) A Weinhold	3	2
(Canada) E Bouchard (United States) S Stephens	6	1
(Uzbekistan) N Abduraimova (Romania) PM Țig	2	0^{r}
(Canada) B Andreescu (United States) L Chirico	6^{1}	3
(Australia) J Moore (United Kingdom) J Rae	7^{7}	6
(Sweden) C Lister (China) Jia Lu	3	7	[5]
2	(Japan) S Aoyama (Czech Republic) R Voráčová	6	5	[10]

Semifinals
1	(India) S Mirza (Romania) M Niculescu	6	5	[8]
(Canada) E Bouchard (United States) S Stephens	1	7	[10]
(Australia) J Moore (United Kingdom) J Rae	2	4
2	(Japan) S Aoyama (Czech Republic) R Voráčová	6	6

Final
(Canada) E Bouchard (United States) S Stephens	3	2
2	(Japan) S Aoyama (Czech Republic) R Voráčová	6	6
