= 2017 Citi Open – Women's singles =

Women's singles
- 2017 Citi Open

Final
- Champion: (Russia) Ekaterina Makarova
- Runner-up: (Germany) Julia Görges
- Score: 3–6, 7–6^{(7–2)}, 6–0

Details
- Draw: 32
- Seeds: 8

Events
| Singles | men | women |
| Doubles | men | women |
- Citi Open

Yanina Wickmayer was the defending singles champion, but chose not to participate this year.

Seventh-seeded Ekaterina Makarova won the title, defeating Julia Görges in the final, 3–6, 7–6^{(7–2)}, 6–0.

== Seeds ==
1. (Romania) Simona Halep (quarterfinals, retired)
2. (France) Kristina Mladenovic (second round)
3. (United States) Lauren Davis (first round)
4. (Germany) Julia Görges (final)
5. (France) Océane Dodin (semifinals)
6. (Romania) Monica Niculescu (quarterfinals)
7. (Russia) Ekaterina Makarova (champion)
8. (United States) Christina McHale (first round)

== Draw ==
Key

- Q = Qualifier
- WC = Wild card
- LL = Lucky loser
- Alt = Alternate
- ITF = ITF entry
- PR = Protected ranking
- SR = Special ranking
- SE = Special exempt
- JE = Junior exempt
- JR = Junior Accelerator Programme entrant
- CO = College Accelerator Programme entrant
- NG = Next Gen Accelerator Program entrant
- w/o = Walkover
- r = Retired
- d = Defaulted

=== Finals ===
Semifinals
7 | (Russia) Ekaterina Makarova | 3 | 6 | 6
5 | (France) Océane Dodin | 6 | 3 | 4
4 | (Germany) Julia Görges | 5 | 6 | 7
(Germany) Andrea Petkovic | 7 | 4 | 5

Final
7 | (Russia) Ekaterina Makarova | 3 | 7^{7} | 6
4 | (Germany) Julia Görges | 6 | 6^{2} | 0

=== Top half ===
First round
1/WC | (Romania) S Halep | 7^{7} | 6
WC | (United States) S Stephens | 6^{3} | 0
(Colombia) M Duque Mariño | 6 | 6
(United States) S Rogers | 4 | 1
Q | (United States) L Chirico | 4 | 4
(Puerto Rico) M Puig | 6 | 6
Q | (United States) J Loeb | 6^{4} | 3
7 | (Russia) E Makarova | 7^{7} | 6
3 | (United States) L Davis | 5 | 3
(Belarus) A Sabalenka | 7 | 6
(Germany) S Lisicki | 7^{9} | 7^{7}
Q | (Greece) V Grammatikopoulou | 6^{7} | 6^{5}
(Japan) R Ozaki | 6^{0} | 2
(Italy) S Errani | 7^{7} | 6
(Serbia) J Janković | 6 | 3 | 0^{r}
5 | (France) O Dodin | 4 | 6 | 2

Second round
1/WC | (Romania) S Halep | 3 | 6 | 6
(Colombia) M Duque Mariño | 6 | 4 | 2
(Puerto Rico) M Puig | 2 | 4
7 | (Russia) E Makarova | 6 | 6
(Belarus) A Sabalenka | 6 | 3 | 3
(Germany) S Lisicki | 4 | 6 | 6
(Italy) S Errani | 6 | 5 | 1
5 | (France) O Dodin | 3 | 7 | 6

Quarterfinals
1/WC | (Romania) S Halep | 6 | 3 | 0^{r}
7 | (Russia) E Makarova | 2 | 6 | 1
(Germany) S Lisicki | 7 | 4 | 6^{4}
5 | (France) O Dodin | 5 | 6 | 7^{7}

Semifinals
7 | (Russia) E Makarova | 3 | 6 | 6
5 | (France) O Dodin | 6 | 3 | 4

=== Bottom half ===
First round
6 | (Romania) M Niculescu | 6 | 2 | 7^{9}
(Japan) N Hibino | 3 | 6 | 6^{7}
Q | (United Kingdom) H Watson | 6^{4} | 6^{3}
(Romania) PM Țig | 7^{7} | 7^{7}
(Belgium) A Van Uytvanck | 7 | 0 | 6
(Slovakia) J Čepelová | 5 | 6 | 1
(Canada) F Abanda | 4 | 4
4 | (Germany) J Görges | 6 | 6
8 | (United States) C McHale | 6^{6} | 0
(Canada) E Bouchard | 7^{8} | 6
(Germany) A Petkovic | 6 | 7^{7}
(Japan) K Nara | 4 | 6^{5}
WC | (Canada) B Andreescu | 5 | 6 | 6
(Italy) C Giorgi | 7 | 3 | 4
(Germany) T Maria | 5 | 6 | 3
2 | (France) K Mladenovic | 7 | 3 | 6

Second round
6 | (Romania) M Niculescu | 6 | 7^{7}
(Romania) PM Țig | 4 | 6^{2}
(Belgium) A Van Uytvanck | 6 | 3 | 6^{9}
4 | (Germany) J Görges | 3 | 6 | 7^{11}
(Canada) E Bouchard | 2 | 6 | 0
(Germany) A Petkovic | 6 | 4 | 6
WC | (Canada) B Andreescu | 6 | 6
2 | (France) K Mladenovic | 2 | 3

Quarterfinals
6 | (Romania) M Niculescu | 3 | 4
4 | (Germany) J Görges | 6 | 6
(Germany) A Petkovic | 6^{3} | 6 | 6
WC | (Canada) B Andreescu | 7^{7} | 1 | 2

Semifinals
4 | (Germany) J Görges | 5 | 6 | 7
(Germany) A Petkovic | 7 | 4 | 5

== Qualifying ==
=== Seeds ===
1. (United Kingdom) Heather Watson (qualified)
2. (United States) Jamie Loeb (qualified)
3. (Australia) Destanee Aiava (first round)
4. (United States) Louisa Chirico (qualified)
5. (Greece) Valentini Grammatikopoulou (qualified)
6. (United States) Usue Maitane Arconada (first round)
7. (Uzbekistan) Nigina Abduraimova (first round)
8. (Israel) Deniz Khazaniuk (first round)

=== Qualifiers ===
1. (United Kingdom) Heather Watson
2. (United States) Jamie Loeb
3. (Greece) Valentini Grammatikopoulou
4. (United States) Louisa Chirico

=== Draw ===
==== First qualifier ====
First round
1 | (United Kingdom) Heather Watson | 6 | 5 | 6
(Japan) Erika Sema | 2 | 7 | 3
(Japan) Shuko Aoyama | 6 | 6
6 | (United States) Usue Maitane Arconada | 2 | 2

Qualifying competition
1 | (United Kingdom) Heather Watson | 6 | 7^{9}
(Japan) Shuko Aoyama | 3 | 6^{7}

==== Second qualifier ====
First round
2 | (United States) Jamie Loeb | 6 | 6
WC | (United States) Skylar Morton | 2 | 2
(United States) Sophie Chang | 7 | 4 | 7
8 | (Israel) Deniz Khazaniuk | 5 | 6 | 5

Qualifying competition
2 | (United States) Jamie Loeb | 6 | 6
(United States) Sophie Chang | 4 | 2

==== Third qualifier ====
First round
3 | (Australia) Destanee Aiava | 1 | 4
(China) Xu Shilin | 6 | 6
WC | (United States) Cameron Morra | 4 | 6 | 2
5 | (Greece) Valentini Grammatikopoulou | 6 | 4 | 6

Qualifying competition
(China) Xu Shilin | 3 | 3
5 | (Greece) Valentini Grammatikopoulou | 6 | 6

==== Fourth qualifier ====
First round
4 | (United States) Louisa Chirico | 6^{3} | 6 | 7^{7}
(Australia) Olivia Rogowska | 7^{7} | 1 | 6^{5}
(China) Lu Jiajing | 6 | 6
7 | (Uzbekistan) Nigina Abduraimova | 4 | 1

Qualifying competition
4 | (United States) Louisa Chirico | 2 | 6 | 6
(China) Lu Jiajing | 6 | 1 | 3
