= 2018 WTA Awards =

Details

Achievements (singles)

Awards
- Player of the year: (Romania) Simona Halep
- Most improved player of the year: (Netherlands) Kiki Bertens
- Newcomer of the year: (Belarus) Aryna Sabalenka
- Comeback player of the year: (United States) Serena Williams

The 2018 WTA Awards are a series of awards given by the Women's Tennis Association to players who have achieved something remarkable during the 2018 WTA Tour.

== The awards ==
These awards are decided by either the media, the players, the association, or the fans. Nominees were announced by the WTA's Twitter account and on the WTA official website.

Note: award winners in bold

=== Player of the Year ===
- (Romania) **Simona Halep**
- (Germany) Angelique Kerber
- (Czech Republic) Petra Kvitová
- (Japan) Naomi Osaka
- (Denmark) Caroline Wozniacki

=== Doubles Team of the Year ===
- (United States) CoCo Vandeweghe & (Australia) Ashleigh Barty
- (Czech Republic) **Barbora Krejčíková & (Czech Republic) Kateřina Siniaková**
- (Belgium) Elise Mertens & (Netherlands) Demi Schuurs
- (Hungary) Tímea Babos & (France) Kristina Mladenovic

=== Most Improved Player of the Year ===
- (Netherlands) **Kiki Bertens**
- (Germany) Julia Görges
- (Russia) Daria Kasatkina
- (Belgium) Elise Mertens
- (China) Wang Qiang
- (Belarus) Aliaksandra Sasnovich

=== Newcomer of the Year ===
- (United States) Amanda Anisimova
- (United States) Danielle Collins
- (Romania) Mihaela Buzărnescu
- (United States) Sofia Kenin
- (Belarus) **Aryna Sabalenka**

=== Comeback Player of the Year ===
- (Switzerland) Belinda Bencic
- (United States) Bethanie Mattek-Sands
- (Australia) Ajla Tomljanović
- (United States) **Serena Williams**

=== Karen Krantzcke Sportsmanship Award ===
- (Czech Republic) **Petra Kvitová**

=== Peachy Kellmeyer Player Service Award ===
- (United States) **Bethanie Mattek-Sands**

=== Diamond Aces ===
- (Ukraine) **Elina Svitolina**

=== WTA Coach of the Year ===
- (Australia) Darren Cahill
- (United States) Kamau Murray
- (Belgium) Wim Fissette
- (France) Thomas Drouet
- (Germany) **Sascha Bajin**

=== Fan Favourite Player ===
- (Romania) **Simona Halep**
- (Germany) Angelique Kerber
- (Denmark) Caroline Wozniacki
- (Ukraine) Elina Svitolina
- (Japan) Naomi Osaka
- (United States) Sloane Stephens
- (Czech Republic) Petra Kvitová
- (Czech Republic) Karolína Plíšková
- (Netherlands) Kiki Bertens
- (Russia) Daria Kasatkina
- (Latvia) Anastasija Sevastova
- (Belgium) Elise Mertens
- (Belarus) Aryna Sabalenka
- (Germany) Julia Görges
- (Australia) Ashleigh Barty
- (United States) Serena Williams
- (United States) Madison Keys
- (Spain) Garbiñe Muguruza
- (France) Caroline Garcia
- (China) Wang Qiang
- (United States) Venus Williams
- (Russia) Maria Sharapova
- (Canada) Eugenie Bouchard
- (Poland) Agnieszka Radwańska
- (Latvia) Jeļena Ostapenko
- (United Kingdom) Johanna Konta

=== Fan Favorite WTA Shot of the Year ===
- (Poland) Agnieszka Radwańska, Auckland Open first round
- (Romania) **Simona Halep, Miami Open third round**()
- (Chinese Taipei) Hsieh Su-wei, Japan Women's Open semifinals
- (Tunisia) Ons Jabeur, Kremlin Cup final

=== Fan Favorite WTA Match of the Year ===
- **(Romania) Simona Halep vs (United States) Sloane Stephens, Canadian Open final (7–6, 3–6, 6–4)**()

=== Fan Favorite Grand Slam Match of the Year ===
- **(Romania) Simona Halep vs (Germany) Angelique Kerber, Australian Open semifinals (6–3, 4–6, 9–7)**()
