= 2017 Citi Open – Men's singles =

Men's singles
- 2017 Citi Open

Final
- Champion: (Germany) Alexander Zverev
- Runner-up: (South Africa) Kevin Anderson
- Score: 6–4, 6–4

Details
- Draw: 48 (6Q / 4WC)
- Seeds: 16

Events
Singles	men	women
Doubles	men	women
- Washington Open

Gaël Monfils was the defending singles champion, but lost in the second round to Yuki Bhambri.

Fifth-seeded Alexander Zverev won the title, defeating Kevin Anderson in the final, 6–4, 6–4.

== Seeds ==
All seeds received a bye into the second round.

1. (Austria) Dominic Thiem (third round)
2. (Japan) Kei Nishikori (semifinals)
3. (Canada) Milos Raonic (quarterfinals)
4. (Bulgaria) Grigor Dimitrov (third round)
5. (Germany) Alexander Zverev (champion)
6. (France) Gaël Monfils (second round)
7. (France) Lucas Pouille (second round)
8. (United States) Jack Sock (semifinals)
9. (United States) John Isner (withdrew due to knee injury)
10. (Australia) Nick Kyrgios (second round, retired)
11. (Luxembourg) Gilles Müller (third round)
12. (Germany) Mischa Zverev (second round)
13. (Argentina) Juan Martín del Potro (third round)
14. (United States) Steve Johnson (second round)
15. (South Africa) Kevin Anderson (final)
16. (United States) Ryan Harrison (second round)

== Draw ==
Key

- Q = Qualifier
- WC = Wild card
- LL = Lucky loser
- Alt = Alternate
- ITF = ITF entry
- PR = Protected ranking
- SR = Special ranking
- SE = Special exempt
- JE = Junior exempt
- JR = Junior Accelerator Programme entrant
- CO = College Accelerator Programme entrant
- NG = Next Gen Accelerator Program entrant
- w/o = Walkover
- r = Retired
- d = Defaulted

=== Finals ===
Quarterfinals
15	(South Africa) Kevin Anderson	6	4	6
Q	(India) Yuki Bhambri	4	6	3
3/WC	(Canada) Milos Raonic	5	4
8	(United States) Jack Sock	7	6
5	(Germany) Alexander Zverev	6	6
(Russia) Daniil Medvedev	2	4
WC	(United States) Tommy Paul	6	6^{8}	4
2/WC	(Japan) Kei Nishikori	3	7^{10}	6

Semifinals
15	(South Africa) Kevin Anderson	6	6
8	(United States) Jack Sock	3	4
5	(Germany) Alexander Zverev	6	6
2/WC	(Japan) Kei Nishikori	3	4

Final
15	(South Africa) Kevin Anderson	4	4
5	(Germany) Alexander Zverev	6	6

=== Top half ===
==== Section 1 ====
First round
(Canada) V Pospisil	7^{9}	4	3
(Switzerland) H Laaksonen	6^{7}	6	6
(Tunisia) M Jaziri	7	7
Q	(Italy) A Bega	5	5
Q	(India) R Ramanathan	4	1
(Argentina) G Pella	6	6
(United States) S Kozlov	5	0^{r}
Q	(India) Y Bhambri	7	2

Second round
1	(Austria) D Thiem	6	6
(Switzerland) H Laaksonen	3	3
(Tunisia) M Jaziri	4	1
15	(South Africa) K Anderson	6	6
12	(Germany) M Zverev	7^{7}	6^{2}	3
(Argentina) G Pella	6^{5}	7^{7}	6
Q	(India) Y Bhambri	6	4	7
6	(France) G Monfils	3	6	5

Third round
1	(Austria) D Thiem	3	7^{8}	6^{7}
15	(South Africa) K Anderson	6	6^{6}	7^{9}
(Argentina) G Pella	7^{7}	3	1
Q	(India) Y Bhambri	6^{5}	6	6

Quarterfinals
15	(South Africa) K Anderson	6	4	6
Q	(India) Y Bhambri	4	6	3

==== Section 2 ====
First round
(France) N Mahut	6	7^{7}
(Italy) T Fabbiano	1	6^{3}
Q	(Israel) E Leshem	6^{1}	0
(Cyprus) M Baghdatis	7^{7}	6
(Israel) D Sela	7^{8}	4	3
(United States) J Donaldson	6^{6}	6	6
Q	(United States) S Bangoura	4	6^{1}
(Romania) M Copil	6	7^{7}

Second round
3/WC	(Canada) M Raonic	7^{7}	7^{10}
(France) N Mahut	6^{2}	6^{8}
(Cyprus) M Baghdatis	6	6
16	(United States) R Harrison	4	1
LL	(Australia) M Polmans	2	3
(United States) J Donaldson	6	6
(Romania) M Copil	6^{2}	6^{6}
8	(United States) J Sock	7^{7}	7^{8}

Third round
3/WC	(Canada) M Raonic	7^{9}	6
(Cyprus) M Baghdatis	6^{7}	3
(United States) J Donaldson	6^{6}	2
8	(United States) J Sock	7^{8}	6

Quarterfinals
3/WC	(Canada) M Raonic	5	4
8	(United States) J Sock	7	6

=== Bottom half ===
==== Section 3 ====
First round
(Australia) J Thompson	6	6
(Belgium) R Bemelmans	3	2
(Japan) G Soeda	6^{2}	3
(United States) T Sandgren	7^{7}	6
(Russia) D Medvedev	6^{8}	6	7^{8}
(United States) R Opelka	7^{10}	3	6^{6}
(South Korea) H Chung	3	1
(United Kingdom) K Edmund	6	6

Second round
5	(Germany) A Zverev	4	6	7^{7}
(Australia) J Thompson	6	3	6^{5}
(United States) T Sandgren	6	3
10	(Australia) N Kyrgios	3	0^{r}
14	(United States) S Johnson	6	4	6^{1}
(Russia) D Medvedev	3	6	7^{7}
(United Kingdom) K Edmund	5	6	3
4/WC	(Bulgaria) G Dimitrov	7	4	6

Third round
5	(Germany) A Zverev	7	7
(United States) T Sandgren	5	5
(Russia) D Medvedev	6	6
4/WC	(Bulgaria) G Dimitrov	4	2

Quarterfinals
5	(Germany) A Zverev	6	6
(Russia) D Medvedev	2	4

==== Section 4 ====
First round
WC	(United States) T Paul	3	7	3
(Norway) C Ruud	6	5	0^{r}
PR	(Russia) D Tursunov	6	6^{4}	6
(United States) M Krueger	4	7^{7}	4
Q	(United States) A Halebian	3	4
(Slovakia) L Lacko	6	6
WC	(United States) T Smyczek	6	3	4
(United States) D Young	4	6	6

Second round
7	(France) L Pouille	6^{6}	3
WC	(United States) T Paul	7^{8}	6
PR	(Russia) D Tursunov	1	2
11	(Luxembourg) G Müller	6	6
13	(Argentina) JM del Potro	7	6
(Slovakia) L Lacko	5	2
(United States) D Young	3	6	6^{5}
2/WC	(Japan) K Nishikori	6	4	7^{7}

Third round
WC	(United States) T Paul	6^{3}	6	6
11	(Luxembourg) G Müller	7^{7}	4	3
13	(Argentina) JM del Potro	4	5
2/WC	(Japan) K Nishikori	6	7

Quarterfinals
WC	(United States) T Paul	6	6^{8}	4
2/WC	(Japan) K Nishikori	3	7^{10}	6

== Qualifying ==
The top two seeds receive a bye into the qualifying competition.

=== Seeds ===
1. (India) Ramkumar Ramanathan (qualified)
2. (India) Yuki Bhambri (qualified)
3. (Australia) Marc Polmans (qualifying competition, lucky loser)
4. (United States) Austin Krajicek (qualifying competition)
5. (Israel) Edan Leshem (qualified)
6. (Brazil) João Pedro Sorgi (qualifying competition)
7. (United States) Sekou Bangoura (qualified)
8. (Italy) Alessandro Bega (qualified)
9. (United Kingdom) Liam Broady (qualifying competition)
10. (Colombia) Alejandro González (qualifying competition)
11. (Australia) Marinko Matosevic (qualifying competition)
12. (United States) Wil Spencer (first round)

=== Qualifiers ===
1. (India) Ramkumar Ramanathan
2. (India) Yuki Bhambri
3. (United States) Alexios Halebian
4. (United States) Sekou Bangoura
5. (Israel) Edan Leshem
6. (Italy) Alessandro Bega

=== Lucky loser ===
1. (Australia) Marc Polmans

=== Qualifying draw ===
==== First qualifier ====
First round				Qualifying competition
				1	(India) Ramkumar Ramanathan	7	6
				11	(Australia) Marinko Matosevic	5	3
Alt	(United States) Patrick Kypson	1	1	11	(Australia) Marinko Matosevic	5	3
11	(Australia) Marinko Matosevic	6	6

==== Second qualifier ====
First round				Qualifying competition
				2	(India) Yuki Bhambri	6	6
				9	(United Kingdom) Liam Broady	2	4
PR	(Germany) Frank Moser	2	4	9	(United Kingdom) Liam Broady	2	4
9	(United Kingdom) Liam Broady	6	6

==== Third qualifier ====
First round
3	(Australia) Marc Polmans	6	6
Alt	(United States) Nicholas Reyes	1	3
(United States) Alexios Halebian	6	5	6
12	(United States) Wil Spencer	1	7	4

Qualifying competition
3	(Australia) Marc Polmans	6^{5}	5
(United States) Alexios Halebian	7^{7}	7

==== Fourth qualifier ====
First round
4	(United States) Austin Krajicek	6	6
(United States) Connor Farren	2	2
WC	(United States) Ryan Goetz	2	7^{7}	0
7	(United States) Sekou Bangoura	6	6^{2}	6

Qualifying competition
4	(United States) Austin Krajicek	7^{7}	5	4
7	(United States) Sekou Bangoura	6^{1}	7	6

==== Fifth qualifier ====
First round
5	(Israel) Edan Leshem	6	7^{8}
Alt	(United States) Alex Rybakov	2	6^{6}
WC	(United States) Ulises Blanch	3	4
10	(Colombia) Alejandro González	6	6

Qualifying competition
5	(Israel) Edan Leshem	6	6
10	(Colombia) Alejandro González	4	2

==== Sixth qualifier ====
First round
6	(Brazil) João Pedro Sorgi	4	6	6
WC	(South Africa) Damon Gooch	6	1	2
WC	(United States) Danny Thomas	6^{3}	3
8	(Italy) Alessandro Bega	7^{7}	6

Qualifying competition
6	(Brazil) João Pedro Sorgi	4	4
8	(Italy) Alessandro Bega	6	6
