= John Stephens (American football) =

American football player (1966–2009)

No. 44, 32, 21
- Position: Running back

Personal information
- Born: February 23, 1966; Shreveport, Louisiana, U.S.
- Died: September 1, 2009 (aged 43); Keithville, Louisiana, U.S.
- Listed height: 6 ft 1 in (1.85 m)
- Listed weight: 220 lb (100 kg)

Career information
- High school: Springhill (Springhill, Louisiana)
- College: Northwestern State
- NFL draft: 1988: 1st round, 17th overall pick

Career history
- New England Patriots (1988–1992); Green Bay Packers (1993); Atlanta Falcons (1993); Kansas City Chiefs (1993)

Awards and highlights
- NFL Offensive Rookie of the Year (1988); Pro Bowl (1988); PFWA All-Rookie Team (1988)

Career NFL statistics
- Rushing yards: 3,440
- Rushing average: 3.6
- Rushing touchdowns: 18
- Stats at Pro Football Reference

John Milton Stephens (February 23, 1966 – September 1, 2009) was an American professional football player who was a running back in the National Football League (NFL).

Pre-draft measurables
Height	Weight	Hand span	40-yard dash	10-yard split	20-yard split	20-yard shuttle	Vertical jump	Broad jump	Bench press
6 ft 0 1/8 in (1.83 m)	220 lb (100 kg)	8 1/2 in (0.22 m)	4.41 s	1.54 s	2.59 s	4.22 s	35.5 in (0.90 m)	9 ft 8 in (2.95 m)	23 reps

Stephens played college football for the Northwestern State Demons in Louisiana, where he broke the program's career rushing record previously set by Joe Delaney. Following his senior season, he was selected by the New England Patriots in the first round (17th overall) of the 1988 NFL draft. Stephens played in six NFL seasons from 1988 to 1993, the first five for the Patriots. As a rookie for the Patriots during the 1988 NFL season, Stephens rushed for 1,168 yards and was selected to his only Pro Bowl. His final season, Stephens played in five games for the Green Bay Packers before being traded to the Atlanta Falcons for cornerback Bruce Pickens. He was with Atlanta for only two weeks and played in no games for the Falcons before being released, and finished the season playing in seven games for the Kansas City Chiefs.

Stephens was married to All-American college swimmer Sybil Smith. Their daughter Sloane Stephens, born in 1993, is a professional tennis player who won the 2017 US Open women's singles title. His son John Stephens Jr. plays tight end in the NFL for the Dallas Cowboys.

Stephens was twice charged with rape. In 1994, after his final NFL season, he was accused of raping a woman at a Kansas City hotel. He pleaded guilty and was sentenced to probation. On September 1, 2009, Stephens died in a car accident while driving on a rural road near Shreveport, Louisiana.

== NFL career statistics ==
Year	Team	GP	Att	Yds	Avg	Lng	TD	Rec	Yds	Avg	Lng	TD
1988	NE	16	297	1,168	3.9	52	4	14	98	7.0	17	0
1989	NE	14	244	833	3.4	35	7	21	207	9.9	37	0
1990	NE	16	212	808	3.8	26	2	28	196	7.0	43	1
1991	NE	14	63	163	2.6	13	2	16	119	7.4	24	0
1992	NE	16	75	277	3.7	19	2	21	161	7.7	32	0
1993	GB	5	48	173	3.6	22	1	5	31	6.2	10	0
1993	KC	7	6	18	3.0	7	0	0	0	0.0	0	0
Career		88	945	3,440	3.6	52	18	105	812	7.7	43	1
