= Kamau Murray =

American tennis coach (born 1980)

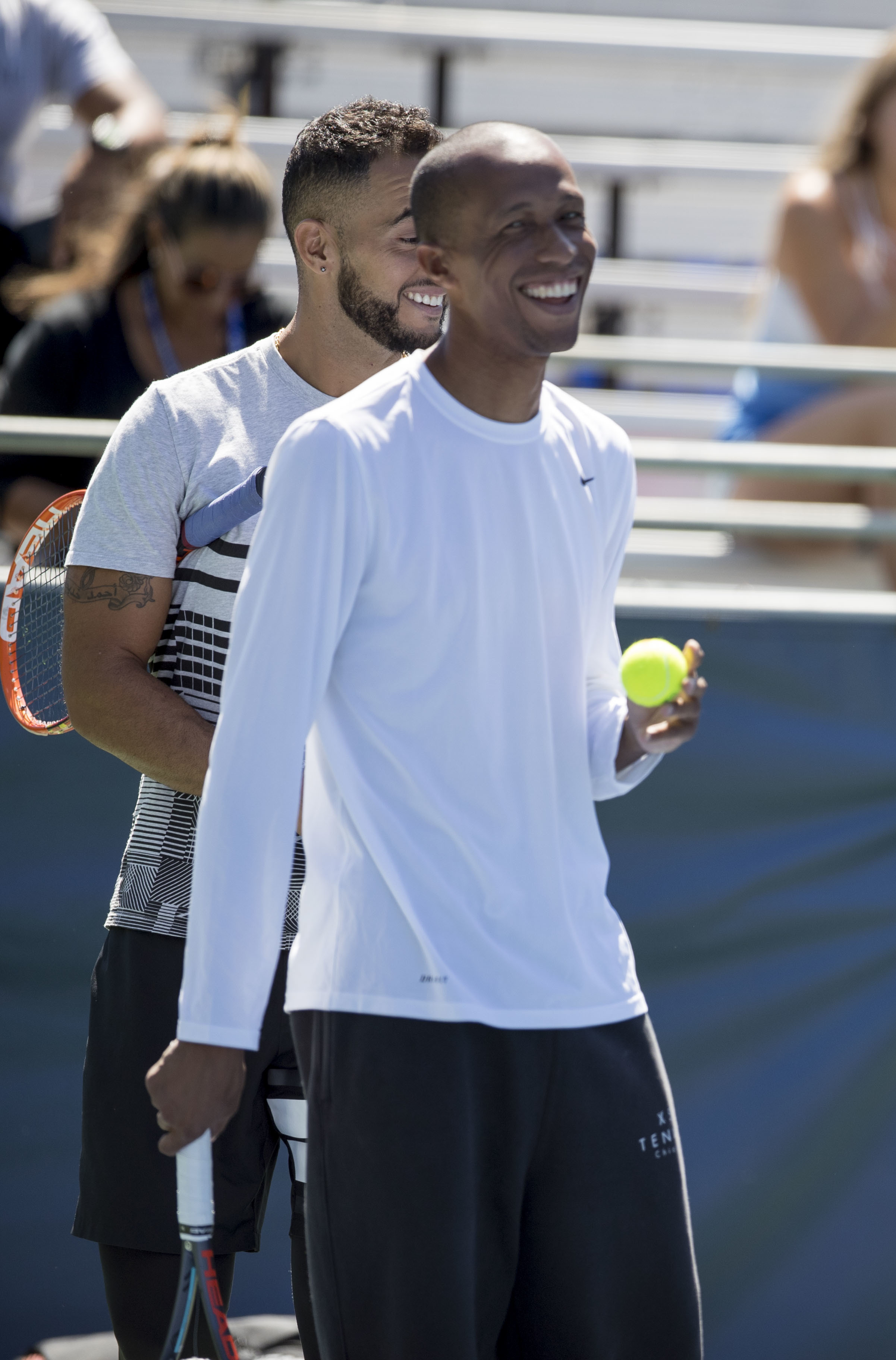
- Murray at 2017 Citi Open
- Country (sports): United States
- Born: 1980 (age 44–45)

Coaching career (2005–)
- Sloane Stephens (2015–19, 2019–21); Monica Puig (2019)

Coaching achievements
- Coachee singles titles total: 5
- List of notable tournaments (with champion) US Open (Stephens)
- Last updated on: 7 April 2021.

Kamau Murray (born 1980) is an American tennis coach. He is best known for coaching Sloane Stephens to the US Open title in 2017.

== Early life and background ==
Murray grew up on the South Side of Chicago. His father was an attorney and his mother was a high school assistant principal. Murray began playing tennis at age 7 during his summer break from school, as it was the first summer program his parents found where they could afford to send him. He continued to play during the school year in Chicago Public Schools after-school programs for many years. His parents also hoped he could earn a scholarship through playing tennis, as they did not expect to be able to pay for him to attend college.

Murray attended Whitney Young Magnet High School, the same high school as USTA president Katrina Adams. He was also classmates with future NBA player Quentin Richardson, who was and still is one of his best friends.

== College career ==
Murray played tennis at Florida A&M University, where he served as the team captain for two years. During his sophomore season, the team won the MEAC conference title. After finishing his undergraduate degree, he also served as an assistant coach for the team while completing an MBA degree.

== Coaching career ==
Murray, side-by-side with Othmane Garma (“Coach OG”), has coached Sloane Stephens on the WTA Tour.

=== XS Tennis ===
Murray is the founder of the XS Tennis program in Chicago. Taylor Townsend was one of Murray's first five players at XS Tennis when he first launched the program.
