= 2017 Citi Open – Men's doubles =

Men's doubles
- 2017 Citi Open

Final
- Champions: (Finland) Henri Kontinen (Australia) John Peers
- Runners-up: (Poland) Łukasz Kubot (Brazil) Marcelo Melo
- Score: 7–6^{(7–5)}, 6–4

Details
- Draw: 16
- Seeds: 4

Events
| Singles | men | women |
| Doubles | men | women |
- Washington Open

Daniel Nestor and Édouard Roger-Vasselin were the defending doubles champions, but chose not to participate together. Nestor played alongside Aisam-ul-Haq Qureshi, but lost in the first round to Rohan Bopanna and Donald Young. Roger-Vasselin teamed up with Steve Johnson, but lost in the first round to Jamie Murray and Bruno Soares.

First-seeded pairing Henri Kontinen and John Peers won the title, defeating Łukasz Kubot and Marcelo Melo in the final, 7–6^{(7–5)}, 6–4.

== Seeds ==
1. (Finland) Henri Kontinen / (Australia) John Peers (champions)
2. (Poland) Łukasz Kubot / (Brazil) Marcelo Melo (final)
3. (United Kingdom) Jamie Murray / (Brazil) Bruno Soares (semifinals)
4. (United States) Bob Bryan / (United States) Mike Bryan (semifinals)

== Draw ==
Key

- Q = Qualifier
- WC = Wild card
- LL = Lucky loser
- Alt = Alternate
- ITF = ITF entry
- PR = Protected ranking
- SR = Special ranking
- SE = Special exempt
- JE = Junior exempt
- JR = Junior Accelerator Programme entrant
- CO = College Accelerator Programme entrant
- NG = Next Gen Accelerator Program entrant
- w/o = Walkover
- r = Retired
- d = Defaulted

First round
1 | (Finland) H Kontinen (Australia) J Peers | 6 | 7
(Austria) O Marach (Croatia) N Mektić | 3 | 5
(Croatia) I Dodig (Croatia) M Pavić | 6 | 7
(Germany) A Zverev (Germany) M Zverev | 1 | 5
3 | (United Kingdom) J Murray (Brazil) B Soares | 7^{10} | 6
(United States) S Johnson (France) É Roger-Vasselin | 6^{8} | 1
Q | (United States) J Cerretani (Australia) M Polmans | 6 | 6
(United States) R Harrison (New Zealand) M Venus | 2 | 2
(Canada) D Nestor (Pakistan) A-u-H Qureshi | 2 | 3
WC | (India) R Bopanna (United States) D Young | 6 | 6
WC | (United States) N Monroe (United States) J Sock | 3 | 4
4 | (United States) B Bryan (United States) M Bryan | 6 | 6
(Bulgaria) G Dimitrov (France) L Pouille | 3 | 6^{2}
(Netherlands) J-J Rojer (Romania) H Tecău | 6 | 7^{7}
(Sweden) R Lindstedt (Austria) D Thiem | 5 | 5
2 | (Poland) Ł Kubot (Brazil) M Melo | 7 | 7

Quarterfinals
1 | (Finland) H Kontinen (Australia) J Peers | 7 | 4 | [14]
(Croatia) I Dodig (Croatia) M Pavić | 5 | 6 | [12]
3 | (United Kingdom) J Murray (Brazil) B Soares | 2 | 6 | [19]
Q | (United States) J Cerretani (Australia) M Polmans | 6 | 3 | [17]
WC | (India) R Bopanna (United States) D Young | 5 | 4
4 | (United States) B Bryan (United States) M Bryan | 7 | 6
(Netherlands) J-J Rojer (Romania) H Tecău | 6^{3} | 6 | [7]
2 | (Poland) Ł Kubot (Brazil) M Melo | 7^{7} | 4 | [10]

Semifinals
1 | (Finland) H Kontinen (Australia) J Peers | 6^{4} | 7 | [10]
3 | (United Kingdom) J Murray (Brazil) B Soares | 7^{7} | 5 | [8]
4 | (United States) B Bryan (United States) M Bryan | 6^{5} | 4
2 | (Poland) Ł Kubot (Brazil) M Melo | 7^{7} | 6

Final
1 | (Finland) H Kontinen (Australia) J Peers | 7^{7} | 6
2 | (Poland) Ł Kubot (Brazil) M Melo | 6^{5} | 4

== Qualifying ==
=== Seeds ===
1. (United States) James Cerretani / (Australia) Marc Polmans (qualified)
2. (Belgium) Ruben Bemelmans / (Russia) Daniil Medvedev (qualifying competition)

=== Qualifiers ===
1. (United States) James Cerretani / (Australia) Marc Polmans

=== Qualifying draw ===
First round
1 | (United States) James Cerretani (Australia) Marc Polmans | 7 | 6
WC | (United States) Ulises Blanch (United States) Danny Thomas | 5 | 3
(Italy) Thomas Fabbiano (Israel) Dudi Sela | 6^{5} | 4
2 | (Belgium) Ruben Bemelmans (Russia) Daniil Medvedev | 7^{7} | 6

Qualifying competition
1 | (United States) James Cerretani (Australia) Marc Polmans | 6 | 6
2 | (Belgium) Ruben Bemelmans (Russia) Daniil Medvedev | 4 | 3
