= Sybil Smith =

American swimmer

Personal information
- Full name: Sybil Smith
- Born: November 23, 1966 (age 59) Fresno, California

Sport
- Sport: Swimming
- Strokes: Backstroke; Butterfly; Freestyle
- College team: Boston University

Sybil Smith (born November 23, 1966) is an American former collegiate swimmer. She is the first African-American female swimmer to be named a first-team Division I All-American, and the only All-American in Boston University women's swimming history. Her daughter Sloane Stephens is a Grand Slam champion tennis player.

== Personal life ==
Smith grew up in Fresno, California, where she attended San Joaquin Memorial High School. She has a brother named Tony who was a professional golfer. Her father Noel Smith emigrated to the United States from Trinidad and became a doctor after earning a scholarship to attend Howard University.

Smith is the mother of tennis player Sloane Stephens, who won the 2017 US Open. She separated from Sloane's father, professional American football player John Stephens, in 1994 after he was arrested multiple times. She married Sheldon Farrell in 1997 and had another child, Shawn Farrell, who played baseball and football at Notre Dame High School outside of Los Angeles, and is currently signed to Empire Distribution as a recording artist & videographer.

== College career ==
Smith is regarded as the best swimmer in Boston University history. In her senior year, she placed sixth at the NCAA Championships in the 100 yard backstroke event. With a finish in the top eight, she was named a first-team All-American and became the first African-American female swimmer in Division I to achieve this feat. To date, she is still the only All-American female swimmer in school history. Her finishing time at the event was also a school record. Smith also holds the school record in the 100 yard butterfly event, as well as seven records in total.

Smith won the Mildred Barnes award for the university's outstanding woman athlete in 1987 and 1988, becoming the first person to receive this honor twice. She was inducted into the Boston University Athletic Hall of Fame in 1993.

== Later career ==
After finishing college, Smith attended graduate school at Harvard University where she studied to become a psychologist. While she was there, she was also the assistant coach of their swim team. She competed at the 1988 US Olympic Trials in three events. Her best result was 21st place in the 50 meter freestyle. Her two other events were the 100 meter freestyle and the 100 meter backstroke.
