= Alexios Halebian =

American tennis player

- Country (sports): United States
- Born: 8 June 1994 (age 31) Hollywood, United States
- Plays: Left-handed (two-handed backhand)
- Prize money: $65,635

Singles
- Career record: 0–1 (at ATP Tour level, Grand Slam level, and in Davis Cup)
- Career titles: 0 ITF
- Highest ranking: No. 537 (6 June 2016)

Doubles
- Career record: 0–0 (at ATP Tour level, Grand Slam level, and in Davis Cup)
- Career titles: 5 ITF
- Highest ranking: No. 515 (6 February 2017)

Alexios Halebian (born 8 June 1994) is an American tennis player.

Halebian has a career high ATP singles ranking of No. 537 achieved on 6 June 2016 and a career high ATP doubles ranking of No. 515 achieved on 6 February 2017.

Halebian made his ATP main draw debut at the 2017 Citi Open after defeating Wil Spencer and Marc Polmans in qualifying. He was defeated by Lukáš Lacko in the first round.
