= 2017 Citi Open =

- Date: July 31 – August 6
- Edition: 49th (men) / 7th (women)
- Category: ATP World Tour 500 (men); WTA International (women)
- Surface: Hard (outdoor); SportMaster Sport Surfaces
- Location: Washington, D.C., United States

Champions

Men's singles
- (Germany) Alexander Zverev

Women's singles
- (Russia) Ekaterina Makarova

Men's doubles
- (Finland) Henri Kontinen / (Australia) John Peers

Women's doubles
- (Japan) Shuko Aoyama / (Czech Republic) Renata Voráčová
- Washington Open

The 2017 Citi Open was a tennis tournament played on outdoor hard courts. It was the 49th edition (for the men) and the 7th edition (for the women) of the Washington Open. The event is part of the ATP World Tour 500 series of the 2017 ATP World Tour, and of the WTA International tournaments of the 2017 WTA Tour. It took place at the William H.G. FitzGerald Tennis Center in Washington, D.C., United States, from July 31 through August 6, 2017. Alexander Zverev and Ekaterina Makarova won the singles titles.

== Finals ==
=== Men's singles ===
- (Germany) Alexander Zverev defeated (South Africa) Kevin Anderson 6–4, 6–4.

=== Women's singles ===
- (Russia) Ekaterina Makarova defeated (Germany) Julia Görges 3–6, 7–6^{(7–2)}, 6–0.

=== Men's doubles ===
- (Finland) Henri Kontinen / (Australia) John Peers defeated (Poland) Łukasz Kubot / (Brazil) Marcelo Melo 7–6^{(7–5)}, 6–4

=== Women's doubles ===
- (Japan) Shuko Aoyama / (Czech Republic) Renata Voráčová defeated (Canada) Eugenie Bouchard / (United States) Sloane Stephens, 6–3, 6–2

== Points and prize money ==
=== Point distribution ===
Event	W	F	SF	QF	Round of 16	Round of 32	Round of 64	Q	Q2	Q1
Men's singles	500	300	180	90	45	20	0	10	4	0
Men's doubles	500	300	180	90	0	—N/a	—N/a	45	25	0
Women's singles	280	180	110	60	30	1	—N/a	18	12	1
Women's doubles	280	180	110	60	1	—N/a	—N/a	—N/a	—N/a	—N/a

=== Prize money ===
Event	W	F	SF	QF	Round of 16	Round of 32	Round of 64^{1}	Q2	Q1
Men's singles	$355,460	$174,265	$87,685	$44,595	$23,160	$12,215	$6,600	$1,355	$690
Men's doubles *	$107,020	$52,400	$26,280	$13,490	$6,970	—N/a	—N/a	—N/a	—N/a
Women's singles	$43,000	$21,400	$11,500	$6,200	$3,420	$2,220	—N/a	$1,285	$750
Women's doubles *	$12,300	$6,400	$3,435	$1,820	$960	—N/a	—N/a	—N/a	—N/a

_{^{1} Qualifiers prize money is also the Round of 64 prize money}
_{* per team}

== ATP singles main-draw entrants ==
=== Seeds ===
Country	Player	Rank^{1}	Seed
AUT	Dominic Thiem	7	1
JPN	Kei Nishikori	8	2
CAN	Milos Raonic	9	3
BUL	Grigor Dimitrov	10	4
GER	Alexander Zverev	11	5
FRA	Gaël Monfils	16	6
FRA	Lucas Pouille	17	7
USA	Jack Sock	19	8
USA	~~John Isner~~	~~20~~	~~9~~
AUS	Nick Kyrgios	21	10
LUX	Gilles Müller	22	11
GER	Mischa Zverev	25	12
ARG	Juan Martín del Potro	30	13
USA	Steve Johnson	34	14
RSA	Kevin Anderson	35	15
USA	Ryan Harrison	42	16

- ^{1} Rankings are as of July 24, 2017

=== Other entrants ===
The following players received wild cards into the main singles draw:

- (Bulgaria) Grigor Dimitrov
- (Japan) Kei Nishikori
- (Canada) Milos Raonic
- (United States) Tim Smyczek
- (United States) Tommy Paul

The following player received entry using a protected ranking:

- (Russia) Dmitry Tursunov

The following players received entry from the singles qualifying draw:

- (United States) Sekou Bangoura
- (Italy) Alessandro Bega
- (India) Yuki Bhambri
- (United States) Alexios Halebian
- (Israel) Edan Leshem
- (India) Ramkumar Ramanathan

The following player received entry as a lucky loser:

- (Australia) Marc Polmans

=== Withdrawals ===
Before the tournament

- (United Kingdom) Dan Evans →replaced by (Belgium) Ruben Bemelmans
- (United States) John Isner →replaced by (Australia) Marc Polmans
- (Ukraine) Illya Marchenko →replaced by (United States) Reilly Opelka
- (Australia) Bernard Tomic →replaced by (United States) Stefan Kozlov

== ATP doubles main-draw entrants ==
=== Seeds ===
Country	Player	Country	Player	Rank^{1}	Seed
FIN	Henri Kontinen	AUS	John Peers	5	1
POL	Łukasz Kubot	BRA	Marcelo Melo	5	3
GBR	Jamie Murray	BRA	Bruno Soares	11	2
USA	Bob Bryan	USA	Mike Bryan	16	4

- ^{1} Rankings are as of July 24, 2017

=== Other entrants ===
The following pairs received wildcards into the doubles main draw:

- (India) Rohan Bopanna / (United States) Donald Young
- (United States) Nicholas Monroe / (United States) Jack Sock

The following pair received entry from the doubles qualifying draw:

- (United States) James Cerretani / (Australia) Marc Polmans

== WTA singles main-draw entrants ==
=== Seeds ===
Country	Player	Rank ^{1}	Seed
ROU	Simona Halep	2	1
FRA	Kristina Mladenovic	13	2
USA	Lauren Davis	35	3
GER	Julia Görges	39	4
FRA	Océane Dodin	54	5
ROU	Monica Niculescu	57	6
RUS	Ekaterina Makarova	59	7
USA	Christina McHale	60	8

- ^{1} Rankings are as of July 24, 2017

=== Other entrants ===
The following players received wild cards into the main singles draw:

- (Canada) Bianca Andreescu
- (Romania) Simona Halep
- (United States) Sloane Stephens

The following players received entry from the qualifying draw:

- (United States) Louisa Chirico
- (Greece) Valentini Grammatikopoulou
- (United States) Jamie Loeb
- (United Kingdom) Heather Watson

=== Withdrawals ===
Before the tournament

- (Russia) Daria Kasatkina →replaced by (Romania) Patricia Maria Țig
- (Kazakhstan) Yulia Putintseva →replaced by (Canada) Françoise Abanda
- (Italy) Francesca Schiavone (entered Stanford tournament) →replaced by (Belarus) Aryna Sabalenka
- (Kazakhstan) Yaroslava Shvedova →replaced by (Colombia) Mariana Duque Mariño
- (Australia) Samantha Stosur →replaced by (Slovakia) Jana Čepelová

== WTA doubles main-draw entrants ==
=== Seeds ===
Country	Player	Country	Player	Rank^{1}	Seed
IND	Sania Mirza	ROU	Monica Niculescu	23	1
JPN	Shuko Aoyama	CZE	Renata Voráčová	81	2
COL	Mariana Duque Mariño	ARG	María Irigoyen	198	3
GRE	Valentini Grammatikopoulou	JPN	Nao Hibino	218	4

- ^{1} Rankings are as of July 24, 2017

=== Other entrants ===
The following pair received a wildcard into the doubles main draw:

- (United States) Skylar Morton / (United States) Alana Smith
