= Skylar Morton =

American tennis player

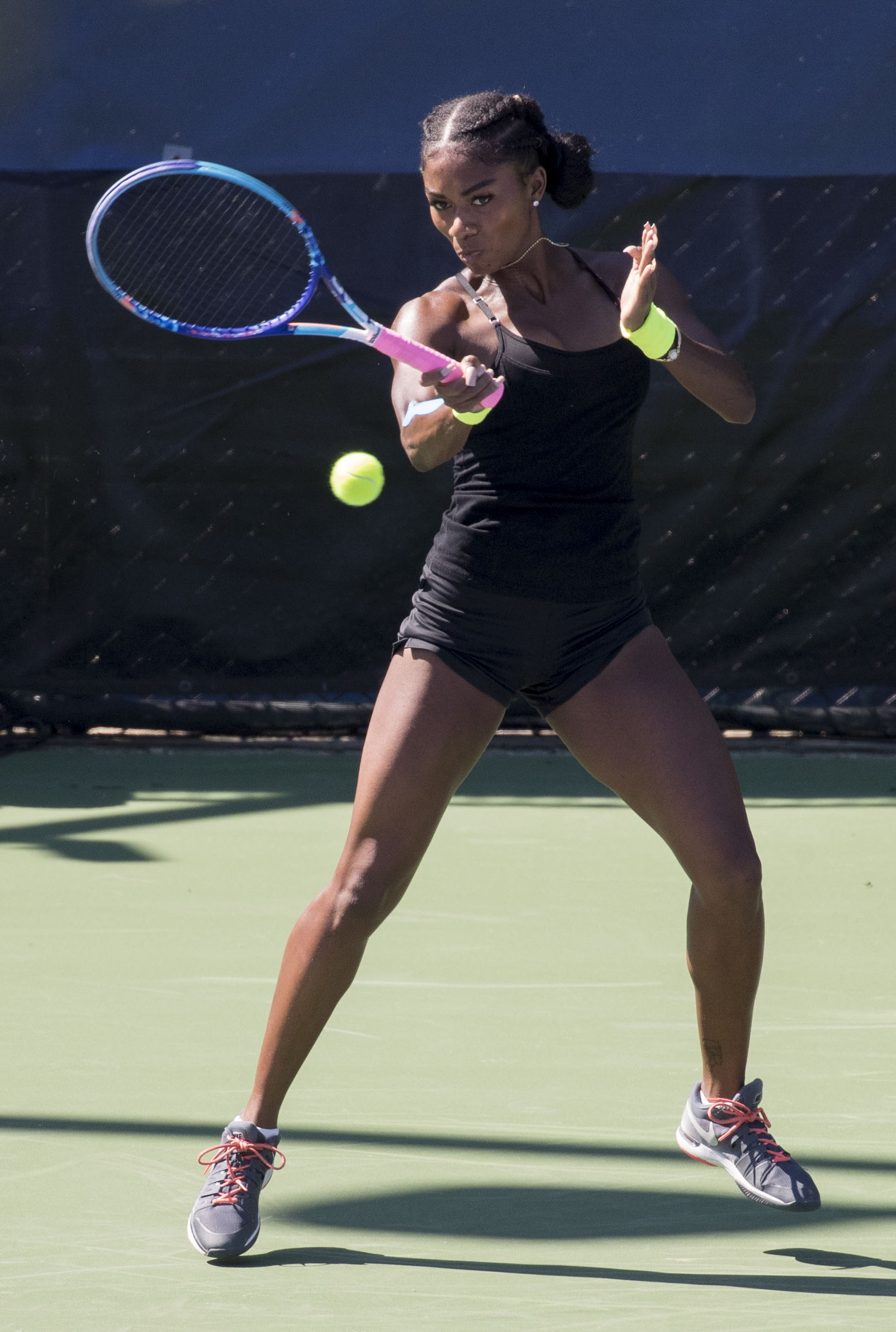
- Morton at the 2017 Citi Open
- Country (sports): United States
- Born: April 24, 1994 (age 32) Bethesda, United States
- Height: 1.73 m (5 ft 8 in)
- College: Virginia; UCLA
- Prize money: $1,405

Singles
- Career record: 2–6
- Career titles: 0
- Highest ranking: No. 1198 (December 19, 2011)

Doubles
- Career record: 1–6
- Career titles: 0
- Last updated on: July 31, 2017.

Skylar Alexandra Morton (born April 24, 1994) is an American tennis player.

Morton has a career high WTA singles ranking of 1198 achieved on December 19, 2011.

Morton made her WTA main draw debut at the 2017 Citi Open in the doubles draw partnering Alana Smith.

Morton played college tennis at the University of Virginia and UCLA.
