= Sloane Stephens =

American tennis player (born 1993)

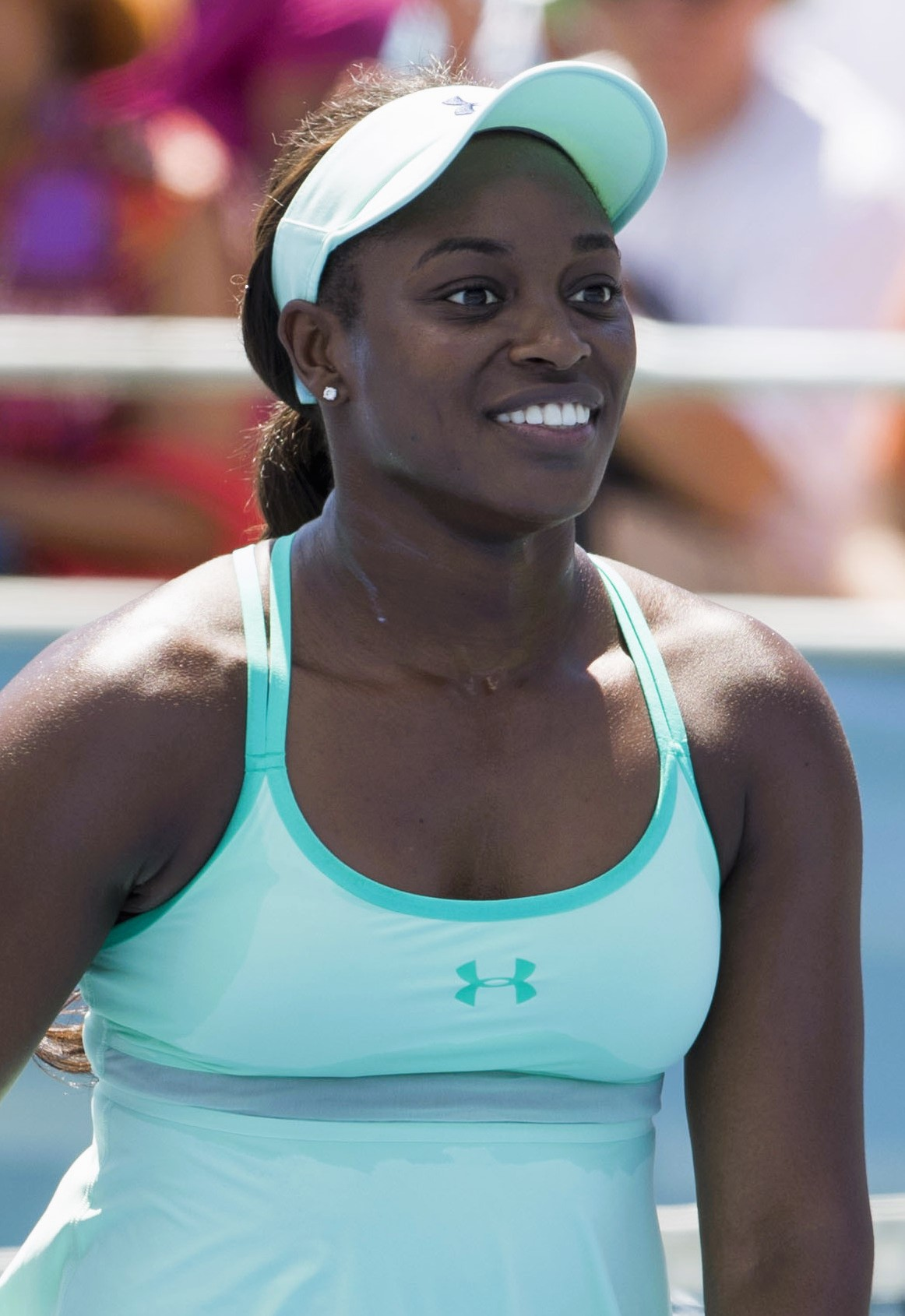
- Stephens at the 2017 Washington Open
- Country (sports): United States
- Residence: Fort Lauderdale, Florida, U.S.
- Born: March 20, 1993 (age 33) Plantation, Florida, U.S.
- Height: 5 ft 7 in (1.70 m)
- Turned pro: 2009
- Plays: Right-handed (two-handed backhand)
- Coach: Kamau Murray, Omar El Kheshen
- Prize money: US$19,383,094: 30th all-time in earnings
- Official website: sloanestephens.com

Singles
- Career record: 393–305
- Career titles: 8
- Highest ranking: No. 3 (July 16, 2018)
- Current ranking: No. 113 (November 2, 2026)

Grand Slam singles results
- Australian Open: SF (2013)
- French Open: F (2018)
- Wimbledon: QF (2013)
- US Open: W (2017)

Other tournaments
- Tour Finals: F (2018)
- Olympic Games: 1R (2016)

Doubles
- Career record: 60–89
- Career titles: 1
- Highest ranking: No. 63 (September 23, 2024)
- Current ranking: No. 1,258 (August 10, 2026)

Grand Slam doubles results
- Australian Open: 1R (2012, 2018)
- French Open: 1R (2024)
- Wimbledon: 2R (2017)
- US Open: 1R (2009, 2010, 2011, 2012, 2017, 2024)

Grand Slam mixed doubles results
- Australian Open: 2R (2016)
- Wimbledon: 3R (2018)
- US Open: 2R (2008, 2012)

Team competitions
- Fed Cup: W (2017), record 9–6
- Last updated on: August 10, 2026.

Sloane Stephens (born March 20, 1993) is an American professional tennis player. She has been ranked as high as world No. 3 in singles by the Women's Tennis Association. Stephens has won eight WTA Tour-level singles titles, including the 2017 US Open. She was also the runner-up at the 2018 French Open. She has a career-high doubles ranking of world No. 63, and has won one WTA Tour doubles title.

Born to athletic parents, Stephens was introduced to tennis in Fresno, California. She became a promising junior player, reaching a junior ranking of world No. 5 and winning three out of four major girls' doubles titles in 2010 partnering Tímea Babos.

At 19 years old, Stephens rose to prominence by reaching the semifinals at the 2013 Australian Open, defeating world No. 3 Serena Williams en route. Although she reached No. 11 towards the end of 2013, she regressed and fell outside the top 25 at the end of 2015. Stephens switched to a new coach, Kamau Murray, under whom she returned to an elite level and won three WTA titles in the first half of 2016. Her successful year was cut short by a foot injury that kept her out for months.

Stephens returned from injury in the middle of 2017 and won the US Open in just her fifth tournament back, being awarded WTA Comeback Player of the Year for her successful season. In 2018, she continued her success by winning her first Premier Mandatory title at the Miami Open, reaching a second major final at the French Open, entering the top 10 for the first time, and finishing runner-up at the WTA Finals.

== Early life and background ==
Stephens was born on March 20, 1993, in Plantation, Florida, to Sybil Smith and John Stephens, both of whom were accomplished athletes. Her mother was the first African-American woman to be named a first-team All-American swimmer in Division I history. She is enshrined in the Boston University Athletic Hall of Fame and recognized as the greatest swimmer in the history of the university. Stephens's father was a Pro Bowl running back for the New England Patriots in the National Football League. Pro Football Hall of Famer Raymond Berry regarded him as the best athlete he had ever seen.

Smith left Stephens's father after his multiple arrests in 1994. Stephens was raised by her mother and her stepfather, Sheldon Farrell, who married Smith in 1997 and worked as a business consultant. Her younger half-brother John Stephens Jr. plays tight end in the NFL. She also has another younger half-brother, Shawn Farrell, who played baseball and football at Notre Dame High School outside of Los Angeles. Stephens did not talk with her biological father until she was 13 years old, when he expressed interest in getting to know her after being diagnosed with degenerative bone disease. Even though they only met a few times in person, the two of them developed a close relationship remotely. Stephens's stepfather died from cancer in 2007, while her biological father died in a car crash in 2009.

Stephens moved to her mother's hometown of Fresno in California at the age of two. She started playing tennis at the age of nine at the Sierra Sport and Racquet Club, a tennis facility located across the street from her house where her stepfather regularly played and her mother was taking lessons. Former top 100 player Francisco González, the head of tennis at the club, recognized Stephens had impressive ability given her limited experience and recommended her to pursue more rigorous training opportunities. Two years after she started playing tennis, Stephens relocated to Boca Raton in Florida. She began training at the Evert Tennis Academy founded by John Evert and also run by his sister, International Tennis Hall of Famer Chris Evert. The following year at age 12, Stephens switched to the Nick Saviano High Performance Tennis Academy, and also began online homeschooling.

After her stepfather's death, Stephens and her family moved back to their hometown of Fresno where her grandparents and other members of her mother's family still lived. From then on, she split time living in both California and Florida.

== Junior years ==
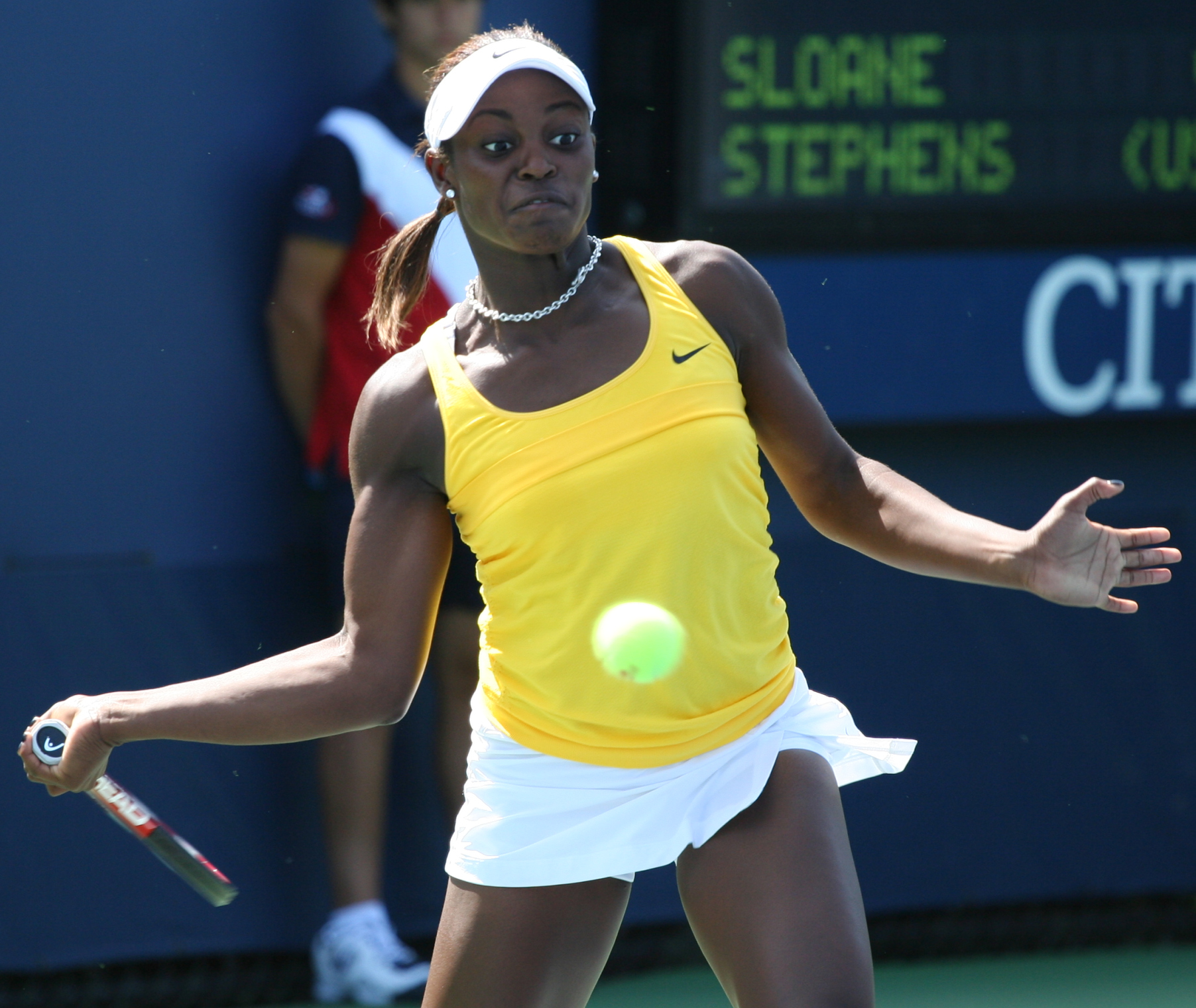
Stephens at the 2009 US Open

Stephens began competing in low-level events on the ITF Junior Circuit in 2006 at the age of 13. Her first breakthrough result came at the US Open in 2008, where she reached her first doubles final at a Grand Slam with Mallory Burdette. She then finished the year with a semifinal appearance at the high-level Orange Bowl tournament, a Grade A event.

Stephens began 2009 by winning her first two tournaments of the year, the Grade 1 USTA International Spring Championships and the Grade A Italian Open. Following these big titles, she only played in the remaining junior Grand Slam events in 2009 and 2010, while also skipping the Australian Open.

At the French Open, Stephens extended her main-draw win streak to 16 matches in a row to start the season, despite needing to qualify for the main draw, before losing to French junior Kristina Mladenovic in the semifinals. Mladenovic ended up winning the tournament, and would also defeat Stephens in their next encounter at the Wimbledon quarterfinals. These results brought her to a career-high junior ranking of No. 5 in the world. During the US Open, she left New York after her first match to attend her biological father's funeral in Louisiana. She returned to play and win her next match, but ultimately lost in the third round.

In 2010, Stephens partnered with Tímea Babos to win the doubles title at all three majors in which they participated. They became just the second pair of girls to win three Grand Slam tournament doubles titles in one season after Corina Morariu and Ludmila Varmužová in 1995. Stephens also reached at least the quarterfinals in each of the singles events. Her best singles result that year was a Grand Slam semifinal at the US Open, where she lost to Daria Gavrilova in a third set tiebreak.

== Professional career ==
=== 2007–11: Tour debut, entering the top 100 ===
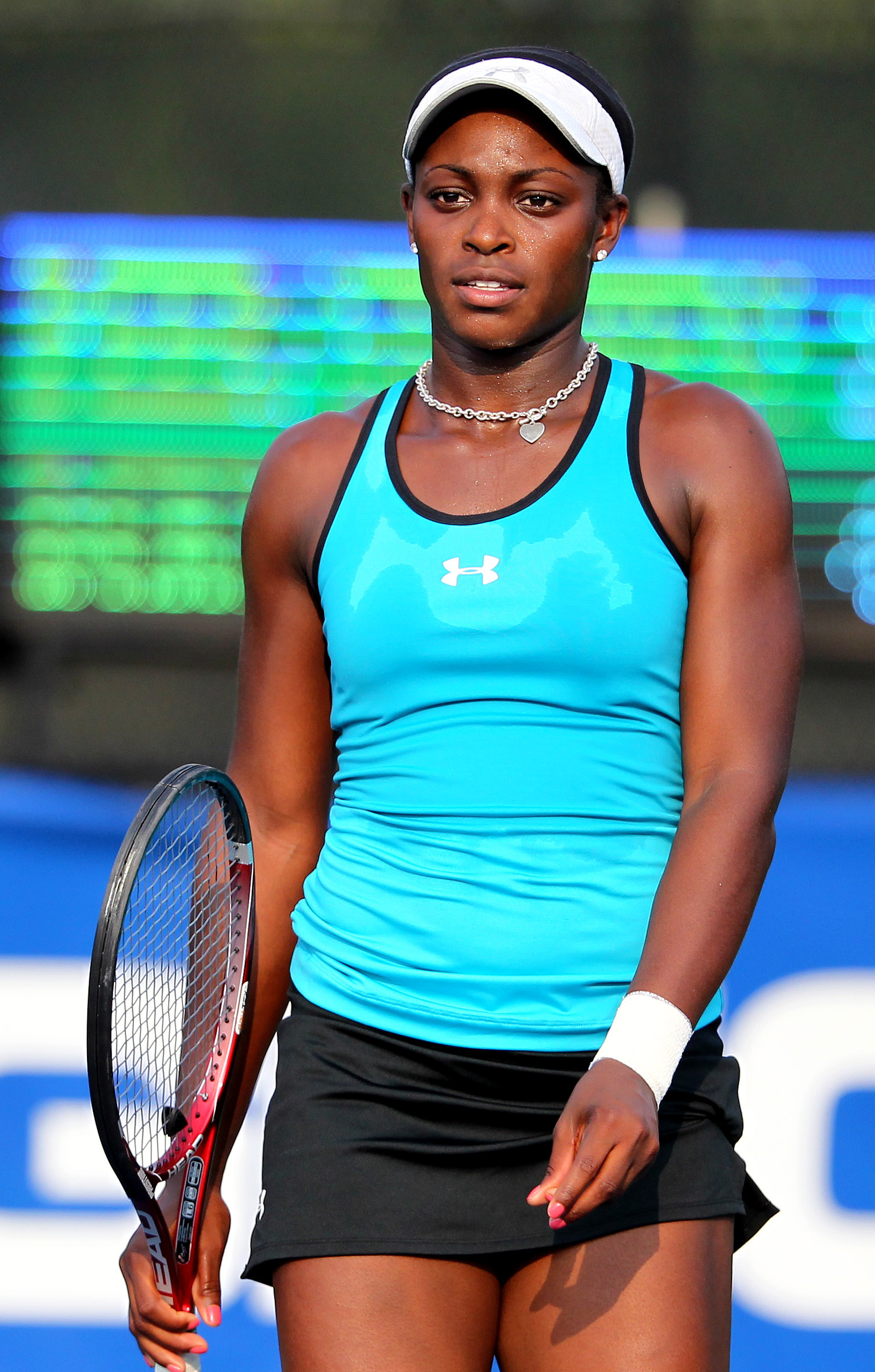
Stephens at the 2011 Washington Open

Stephens played her first professional events on the ITF Women's Circuit in late 2007. In the spring of 2008, she received a qualifying wildcard into her first WTA Tour event, the Miami Open, where she lost her opening round match. She would lose in qualifying the next two years as well. Stephens also received wildcards into the US Open qualifying rounds for three consecutive years. In her first appearance in 2008, she defeated world No. 109, Melinda Czink, while still only 15 years old, but was unable to advance to the main draw in any of these appearances. During the summer of 2008, Stephens won her first professional title in doubles at a low-level event in Wichita, alongside partner Christina McHale.

In the middle of 2009, Stephens participated in World TeamTennis as a member of the New York Buzz. Although she seldom played on the pro tour that year, Stephens decided to turn pro in October following a strong junior season. In March 2010, Stephens qualified for the Indian Wells Open to make her WTA Tour main-draw debut a week before turning 17. She defeated Lucie Hradecká in her first career main-draw match before losing to the defending champion, 12th-seeded Vera Zvonareva. Her only other WTA Tour win that year came at the Swedish Open in July. After starting the year ranked No. 802, she finished the 2010 season just inside the top 200 at No. 198.

Stephens continued to climb the WTA rankings during the 2011 clay-court season. She won her first professional singles title at the Camparini Gioielli Cup, a $50k event in Italy. She then made it through qualifying at the French Open to make her Grand Slam main-draw debut in singles. Although she lost to Elena Baltacha, she rose to a career best No. 128 in the world. In August, Stephens entered the Southern California Open as a wildcard and defeated No. 20, Julia Görges, en route to her first WTA Tour quarterfinal. Later that month, she was awarded a wildcard into her first US Open main draw. In the opening round, she defeated Réka Luca Jani for her first Grand Slam tournament match win. She then backed up that win by beating 23rd seed Shahar Pe'er. With this third-round appearance, Stephens made her debut in the top 100 of the WTA rankings and also became the youngest player in the top 100 at 18 years old.

=== 2012: Teenage success, top 50 ===
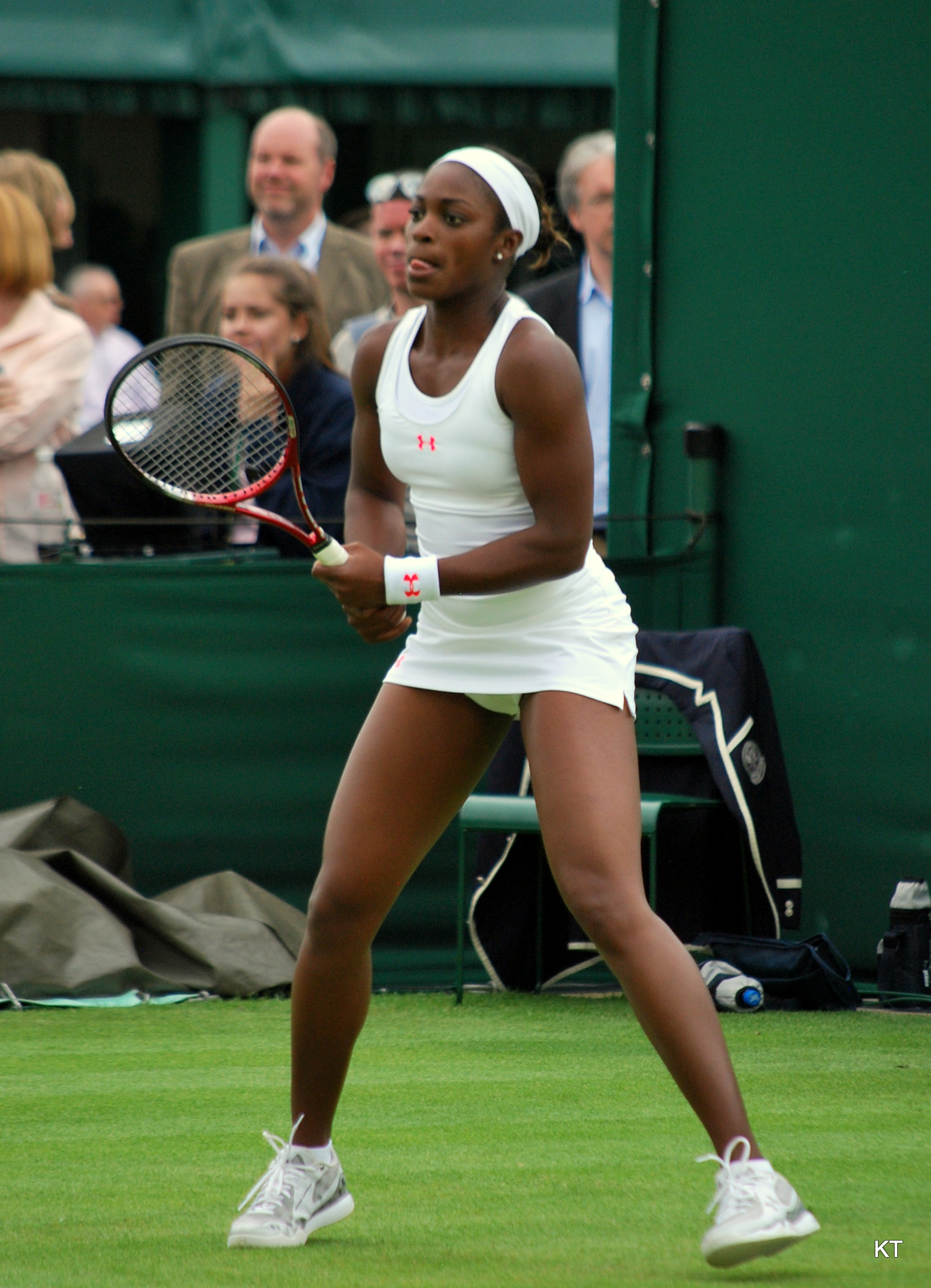
Stephens at the 2012 Wimbledon Championships

With an improved ranking, Stephens was able to play tour-level events the entire season. Early in the year, she played in her first Australian Open main draw and made it to the second round. Stephens then closed out the winter hardcourt season by qualifying for the Miami Open. Having played there every year since 2008, she picked up her first two main draw wins at the tournament, including the second one over No. 30 Sara Errani. In late April, Stephens made her Fed Cup debut in an away playoff tie against Ukraine. She won her only match, a doubles dead rubber with partner Liezel Huber, as the United States won the tie 5–0 to return to the top-level World Group in 2013.

After early losses at her first few clay-court events of the year, Stephens finished this part of the season with three impressive results. First, she qualified for the Premier-5 Italian Open and advanced to the second round. She then reached her first tour semifinal at the Internationaux de Strasbourg. Finally, she produced her best result at a Grand Slam tournament to date by reaching the fourth round at the French Open. Stephens built on this momentum with a third-round appearance in her Wimbledon main-draw debut, which was highlighted by an upset of 23rd seed Petra Cetkovská. This string of performances brought her into the top 50 of the WTA rankings for the first time.

Back in the United States, Stephens played at the Washington Open in late July and made it to her second career WTA semifinal. She also reached the third round at the Premier 5 Cincinnati Open, where she lost a tight match to world No. 3, Agnieszka Radwańska. Her final tournament of the year was the US Open. She lost in the third round to No. 13 Ana Ivanovic, after struggling with a torn abdominal muscle, which was initially injured during her fourth-round loss at the French Open a few months earlier. Stephens later stated, "I kept playing when I shouldn't have," as part of an effort to try to qualify for the Olympics. She ended up taking the rest of the year off to recover. Nonetheless, she finished the year as the youngest player in the top 50 at No. 38.

=== 2013: Major semifinal, Serena upset, world No. 11 ===
Stephens was ready to return for the Australian hardcourt season. In her first tournament back, she made it to the quarterfinals at the Brisbane International to set up an encounter with world No. 3, Serena Williams. Although Williams won the match in straight sets, she praised Stephens, saying she could be "the best in the world one day." Stephens improved on that result the following week with a semifinal at the Hobart International. She entered the Australian Open seeded 29th, her first Grand Slam tournament as a seeded player. She defeated four unseeded players to make her first Grand Slam tournament quarterfinal and set up her second clash with Williams that month. Williams entered the semifinal on a 20 match win streak, while multiple betting websites listed the 19-year-old Stephens as at least an 11-to-1 underdog. Stephens was down a set and a break early in the second set, but came from behind to pull off a huge upset. This was the first top-ten victory of Stephens's career and made her much more prominent. Although Stephens would lose her next match to world No. 1, Victoria Azarenka, she rose to a career-high ranking of No. 17 after the tournament.

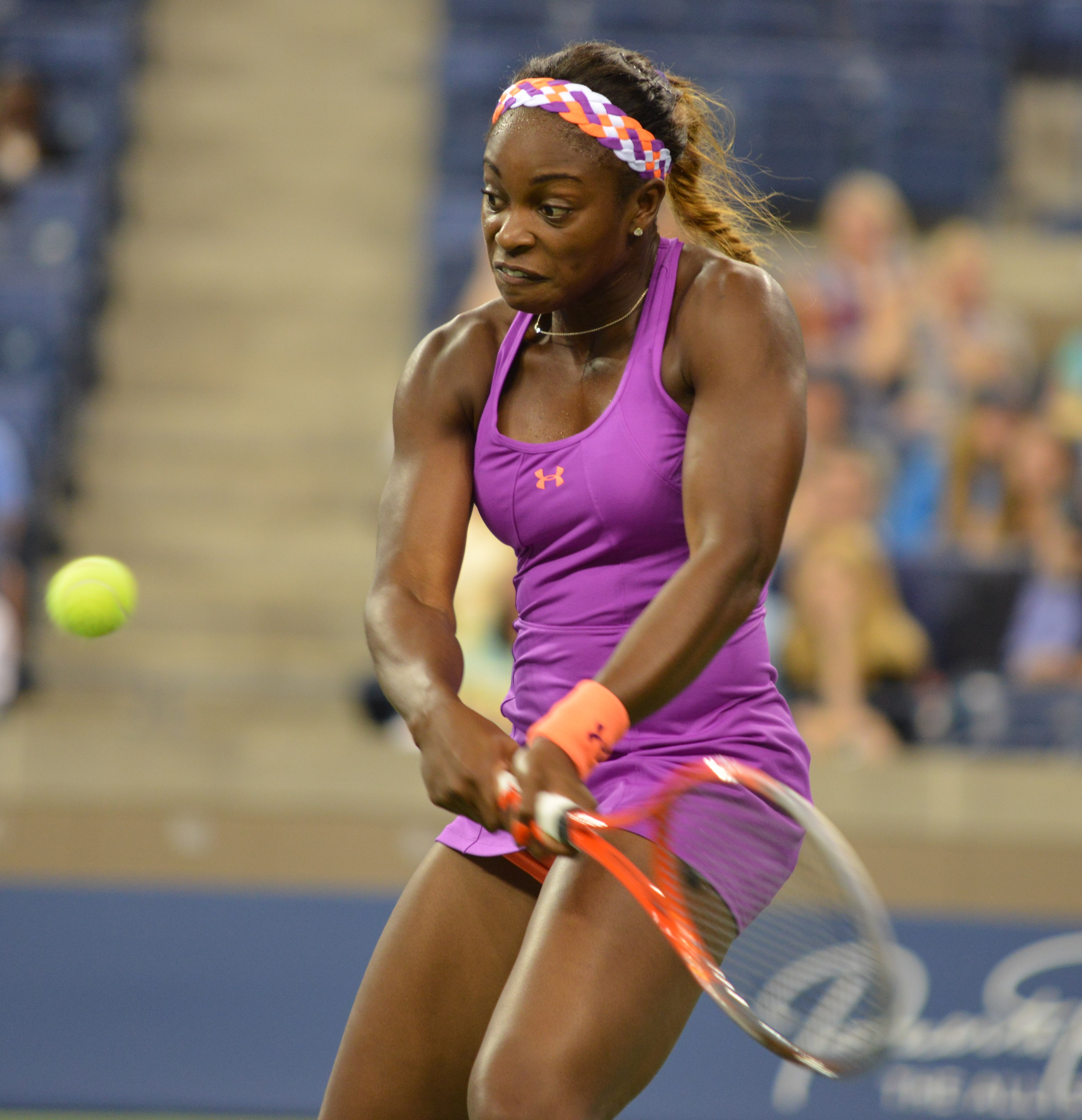
Stephens at the 2013 US Open

Following the Australian Open, Stephens was forced to miss the United States' quarterfinal Fed Cup tie after aggravating her abdominal injury during her deep run at the tournament. When she returned to the court, this injury continued to hinder her performance as she did not defeat another top 50 opponent until after the clay-court season. She played in the Fed Cup playoff tie in April and lost her only match against Sweden's Sofia Arvidsson. Nonetheless, the United States won the tie 3–2 to secure a place in the 2014 World Group. Despite these struggles, Stephens produced another good Grand Slam tournament result at the French Open, where she defeated three unseeded opponents – none ranked higher than No. 92 – to reach the fourth round. She then lost to world No. 2, Maria Sharapova. Stephens continued her Grand Slam tournament success at Wimbledon by making it to the quarterfinals, again without defeating a seeded opponent. She lost to the eventual champion Marion Bartoli. Her best win at these two majors came in the first round of Wimbledon against world No. 25, Jamie Hampton.

At the Cincinnati Open in August, Stephens scored her second big upset of the year when she knocked out Sharapova, the No. 3 player in the world, in the second round. She lost in the next round to No. 15, Jelena Jankovic. Two weeks later, Stephens entered the US Open as the 15th seed, where she faced Williams again in the fourth round. This time, Williams avenged her Australian Open loss in straight sets and went on to win the tournament. Although Stephens continued to struggle outside of the majors after the US Open, she was named the second alternate for the WTA Tour Championships. She finished the year at world No. 12 and was one of only three players to make it to the second week of all four Grand Slam tournaments in 2013, along with Williams and Agnieszka Radwańska. Stephens also reached a career-high ranking of No. 11 in October and became the second-highest ranked American.

=== 2014: Inconsistency ===
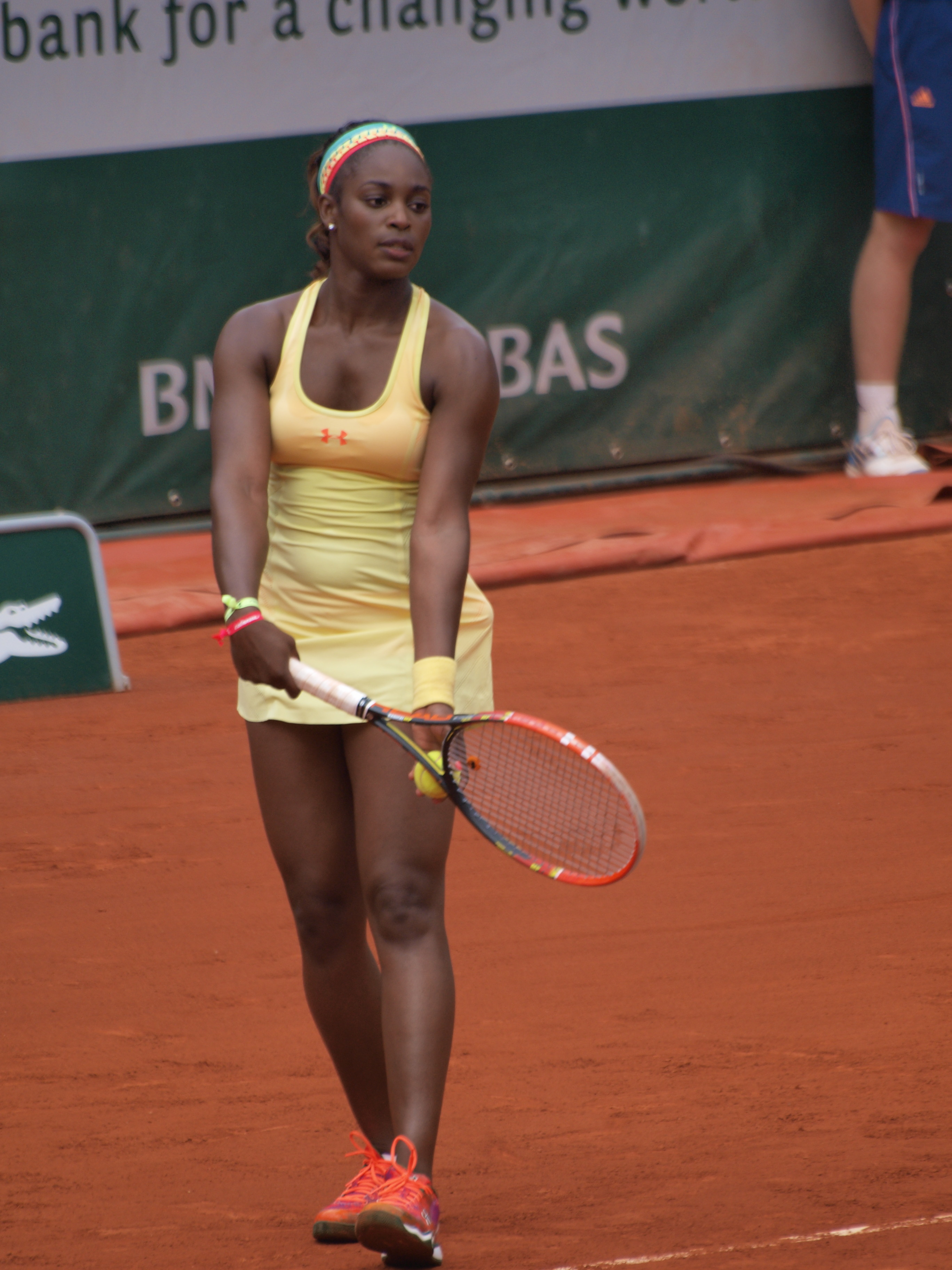
Stephens at the 2014 French Open

Stephens began 2014 at the Hopman Cup with John Isner. The two Americans finished the round-robin in third place in their group, with only one rubber win against Spain. Stephens also withdrew from her last match with a wrist injury. She was able to recover in time to open her season at the Australian Open. A year after her breakthrough, she reached the fourth round and was again defeated by world No. 2, Victoria Azarenka, for the second consecutive year. Her next successful tournament came in March at the Indian Wells Open. Here, Stephens upset No. 13 Ana Ivanovic in the third round and went on to reach her first quarterfinal at a Premier Mandatory event.

Stephens returned to the United States Fed Cup team in April for their home playoff tie against France. She played two singles matches and the decisive doubles rubber. After losing to an up-and-coming Caroline Garcia and picking up a win against Virginie Razzano, Stephens and her partner Madison Keys lost to the two of them in the final doubles match to relegate the United States into World Group II the following year. Once again, Stephens did not have a good clay-court season, winning multiple matches in just two out of six tournaments. Nonetheless, her best result of the season came at the French Open, where she lost to No. 4 Simona Halep in the fourth round. In the grass-court season, Stephens was seeded 18th at Wimbledon, but suffered a first round loss to world No. 109, Maria Kirilenko. This loss snapped her streak of reaching the second week of every major since a third-round loss at the 2012 US Open.

Stephens did not do well at the US Open either, losing in the second round to world No. 96, Johanna Larsson, while committing 63 unforced errors. After playing in one more tournament in September, she ended her season early to recover from a wrist injury. By the end of the year, she fell to No. 37 in the world.

=== 2015: First WTA Tour title ===
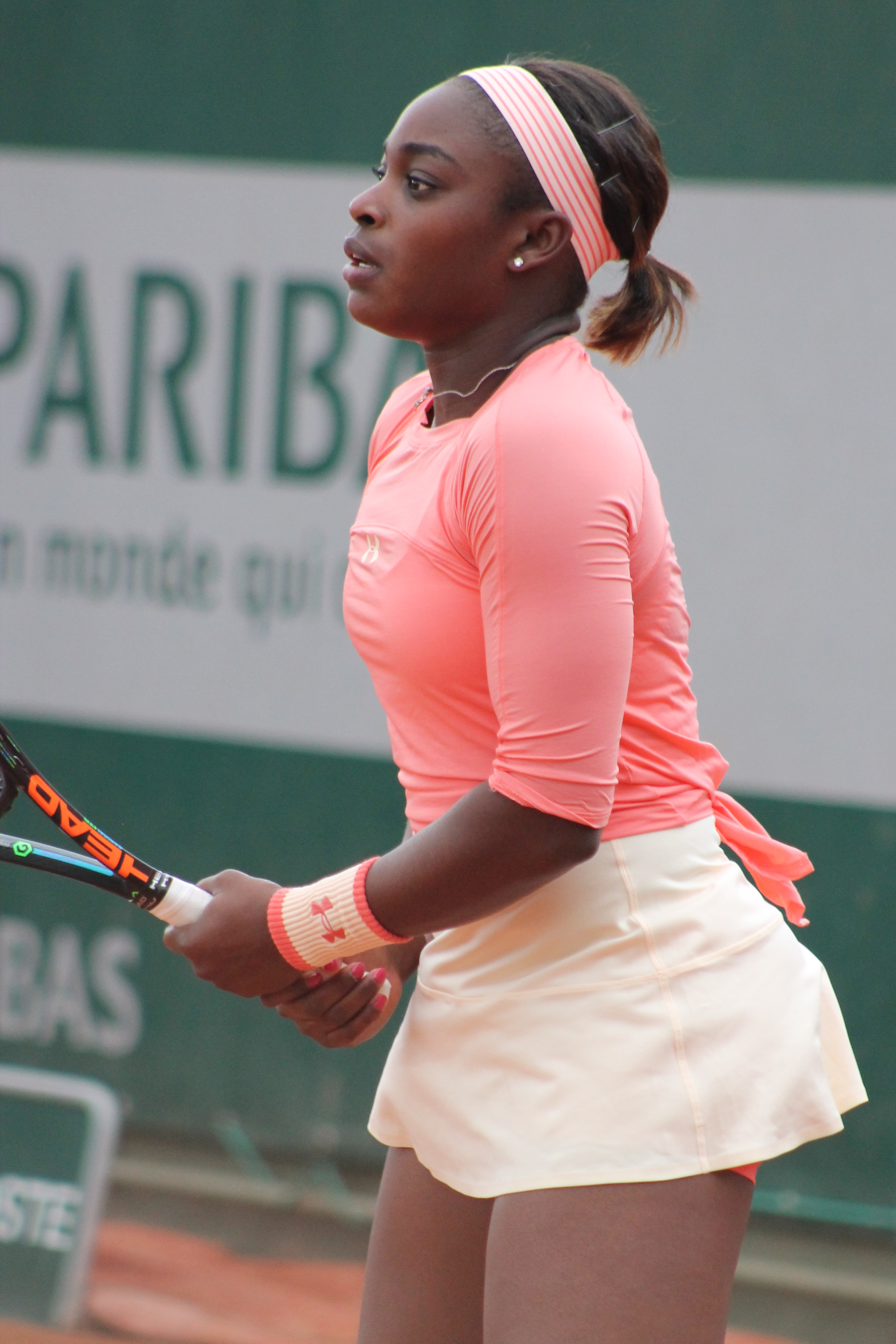
Stephens at the 2015 French Open

Stephens returned from injury to start the season at the Auckland Open and the Hobart International, but lost in the second round at both tournaments. She entered the Australian Open unseeded and faced a difficult draw against Victoria Azarenka in the first round. Azarenka eliminated Stephens for the third consecutive year. Her first two successful tournaments of the year came at the Premier Mandatory events in March. She reached the fourth round at Indian Wells, where she lost a three-set match to world No. 1, Serena Williams, who was returning from her long boycott of the tournament. Stephens then improved on that result with a quarterfinal appearance at the Miami Open, which included a win over rival Madison Keys in their first encounter.

Despite these good results, Stephens got off to a slow start in the clay-court season. She did not return to form until late May when she reached her second semifinal at Strasbourg. Having struggled at the last three Grand Slam events, Stephens managed to upset world No. 15, Venus Williams, in the first round of the French Open in their first ever meeting. Serena then defeated her in the fourth round, which turned out to be Stephens's best Grand Slam tournament result of the year. In her only grass-court tune-up, Stephens made it to the semifinals at the Eastbourne International. She notably defeated world No. 9, Carla Suárez Navarro, in the second round for her first top-ten victory in almost two years. Stephens closed the European season with a third-round appearance at Wimbledon.

Stephens did not play again until the Washington Open in August. She won the tournament without dropping a set for her first career WTA title. She defeated No. 21 Sam Stosur in the semifinals and won the final against Anastasia Pavlyuchenkova while only dropping three games. The title brought Stephens back into the top 30. At the US Open, she was seeded at a Grand Slam tournament for the first time that year but lost in the first round to compatriot CoCo Vandeweghe. She maintained a steady ranking all year, dropping no lower than No. 45 while rising no higher than No. 28, finishing the season at No. 30 in the world.

=== 2016: Three career titles, foot injury ===
In the off-season, Stephens hired Kamau Murray to be her new coach. Their partnership proved successful immediately. At the Auckland Open, Stephens won her first tournament with the two of them together. Due to a rain suspension, she was forced to play the end of her semifinal match against No. 17, Caroline Wozniacki, as well as the entire final against Julia Görges on the same day to claim the title. Stephens would win two more career titles during the season. Her second title of the year also came on hardcourt at the Mexican Open. Her third and last title of the year came on clay at the higher-level Charleston Open, a low-level Premier event. During the semifinals of this tournament, she defeated No. 2 Angelique Kerber, who needed to retire in the second set due to an illness. Part of her prize in Charleston included a car from the title sponsor Volvo, which Stephens was unaware of until after the tournament.

In contrast to previous years where Stephens struggled at smaller tournaments while still doing well at bigger tournaments, she struggled at the Grand Slam tournaments and high-level Premier events in 2016. Her best Grand Slam tournament results of the year came at the French Open and Wimbledon, where she reached the third round at both events. She also lost in the first round of the Australian Open for the second consecutive year, this time to a qualifier. Her last tournament of the year was the 2016 Rio Olympics, which ended with a first round loss to Eugenie Bouchard. After the Olympics, Stephens revealed she had been hindered by a left foot injury for most of the year, for which doctors recommended time off to recover. She finally did end her season upon being diagnosed with a stress fracture. Although she was initially expected to only miss several months, it was later discovered that she would need surgery that would keep her out for the first half of 2017 as well. At the time of her last WTA Tour event of the year at the end of July, Stephens was ranked No. 22 in the world.

=== 2017: Comeback, US Open title, Fed Cup champion ===
She had foot surgery in January and could not walk again without a boot until the middle of April. While unable to play on the tour, Stephens was granted the opportunity to be a broadcaster for the Tennis Channel. She attended several WTA events in the United States including Indian Wells, the Miami, and Charleston, where she interviewed fellow tennis players and also provided analysis. Stephens returned to the WTA Tour in July for Wimbledon, about eleven months after her last match and with her ranking having dropped to No. 336. She lost her first two matches back, one to compatriot Alison Riske at Wimbledon, and the other to No. 2, Simona Halep, at Washington. However, she showed some signs of improvement by reaching the doubles final at Washington with Eugenie Bouchard.

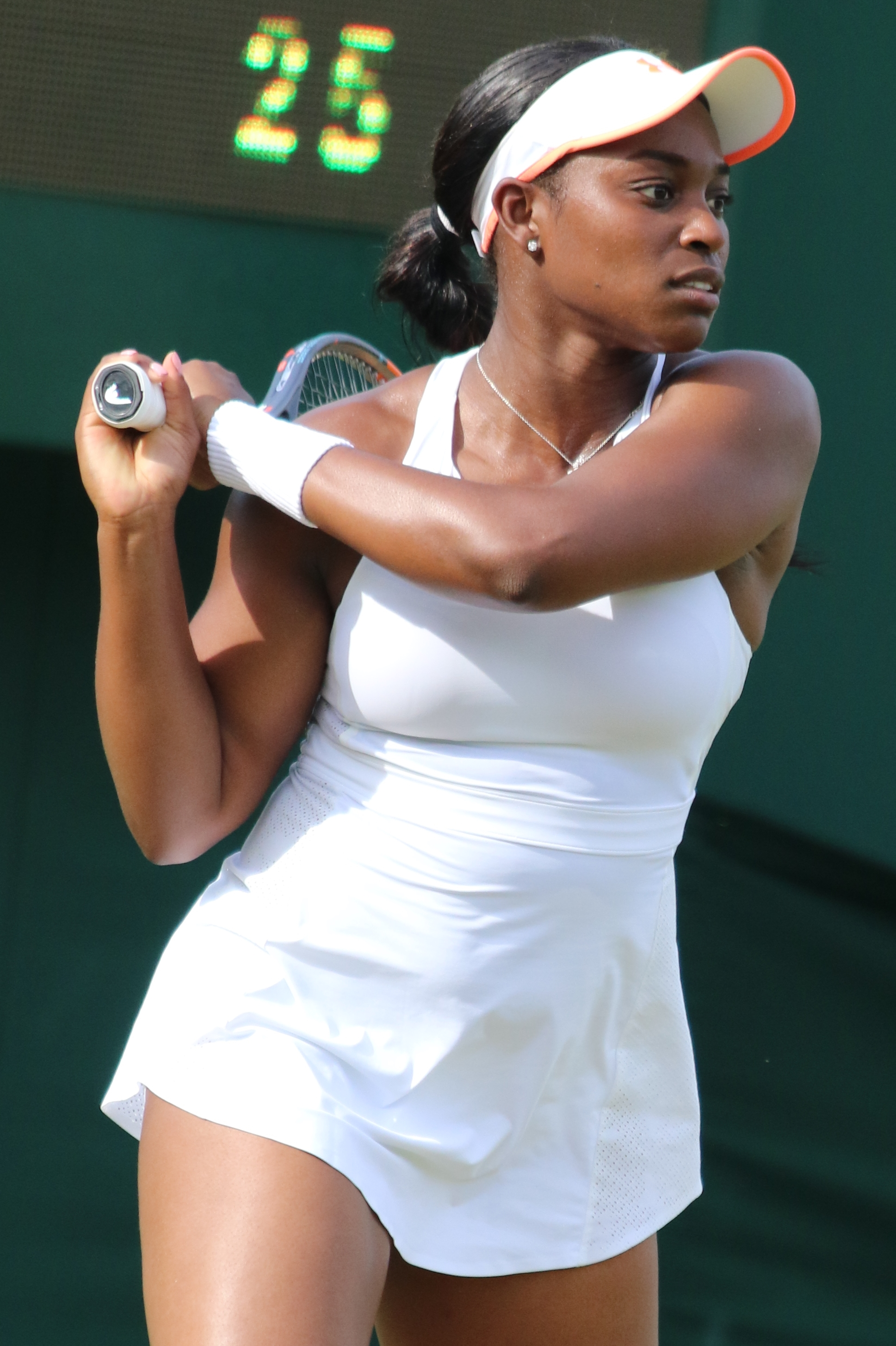
Stephens at the 2017 Wimbledon Championships

By August, Stephens's ranking had continued to fall to as low as No. 957. But she was able to reach the semifinals of both Premier 5 tournaments that month, the Canadian Open and the Cincinnati Open. During each tournament, she defeated four top-50 players including Lucie Šafářová and 14th seed Petra Kvitová at both events, and also No. 3 Angelique Kerber. Stephens was defeated by a top ten player in both semifinals, No. 6 Caroline Wozniacki in Canada, and No. 2 Halep again in Cincinnati. Stephens had entered the month having never reached a semifinal at a high-level Premier tournament. With these results, Stephens climbed back into the top 100 of the WTA rankings.

Stephens entered the US Open at world No. 83, and still needed to use a protected ranking to be accepted into the main draw due to the entry deadline being over a month before the event. Her first upset of the tournament came in the second round over No. 10 Dominika Cibulková. In the fourth round, she defeated No. 33 Julia Görges to advance to her first US Open quarterfinal and her first major quarterfinal since Wimbledon in 2013. She then defeated No. 17 Anastasija Sevastova to set up the first all-American semifinals at a major since Wimbledon in 1985, and the first at the US Open since 1981. Her semifinal was against No. 9 Venus Williams. After two lopsided split sets, Stephens won a tight third set to reach her first Grand Slam singles final. Madison Keys won the other semifinal against CoCo Vandeweghe. Stephens closed out the tournament by defeating Keys in straight sets to win her first Grand Slam tournament title. She became the first American woman other than the Williams sisters to win a major title since Jennifer Capriati won the Australian Open in 2002 and the first to win the US Open since Lindsay Davenport in 1998. She also became the lowest-ranked US Open champion ever, and the fifth-lowest at any Grand Slam tournament.

After the US Open, Stephens did not win another match the rest of the season. This stretch notably included two matches at the year-end Elite Trophy as well as two singles rubbers in the Fed Cup final against Belarus. Nonetheless, the United States won the tie 3–2 to give Stephens her first Fed Cup crown. This was the first title for the United States since 2000. Stephens finished the season ranked No. 13 and was named WTA Comeback Player of the Year.

=== 2018: French Open finalist, WTA Finals runner-up, world No. 3 ===
Stephens extended her losing streak to eight matches at the Australian Open. She dismissed concerns about her form from the media, saying, "Everything's good. Just relax, everybody. It'll be okay, don't worry." In the coming months, she would prove to be correct, first by snapping her losing streak at her next tournament in Acapulco. In March, Stephens returned to form and won the Miami Open, her first Premier Mandatory title. She defeated three top-ten players at the event, including No. 3 Garbiñe Muguruza, and No. 10 Angelique Kerber in the fourth round and quarterfinals, and No. 5 Jeļena Ostapenko in the final. With this performance, she also cracked the top 10 for the first time.

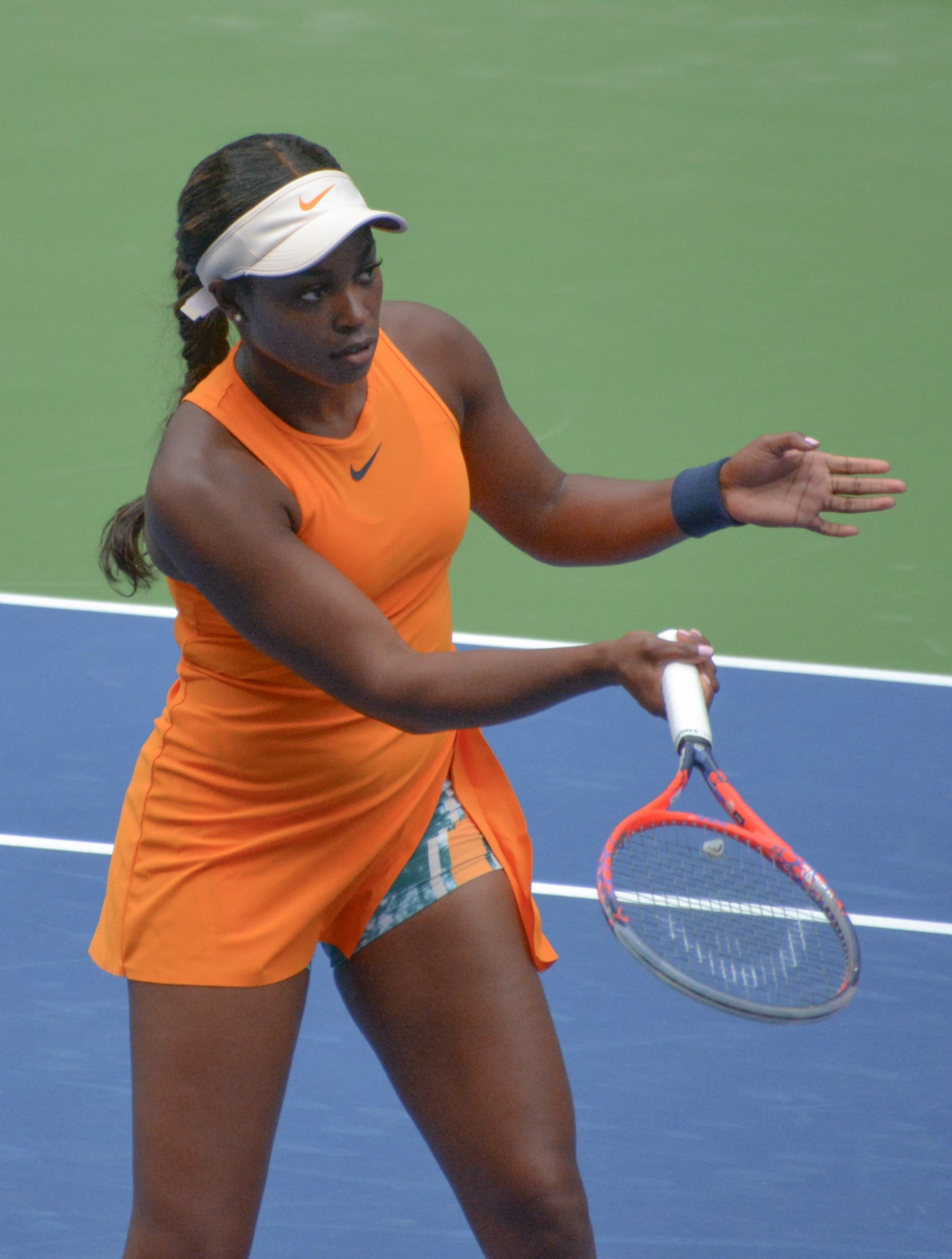
Stephens at the 2018 US Open

Despite winning the second biggest title of her career, Stephens was unable to make the quarterfinals in any of her French Open preparation tournaments. The highlight of her clay-court season in the lead up to the French Open was the Fed Cup semifinals on the road against France, where she won both of her singles rubbers over Pauline Parmentier and Kristina Mladenovic to lead the United States to a 3–2 victory. Stephens entered the French Open having never reached the quarterfinals. However, she was able to produce her best result at the tournament, making it to the final. In the semifinals, Stephens won a rematch of the 2017 US Open final against Madison Keys, the first all-American semifinal there since 2002. Despite going up a set and a break, Stephens lost the final to world No. 1, Simona Halep, her first loss in a WTA Tour singles final. Nonetheless, this run catapulted her to a career-high ranking of No. 4 in the world, making her the first American woman other than the Williams sisters to be ranked in the top 5 in singles since Lindsay Davenport in 2006.

Stephens did not carry any momentum into the grass-court season, losing at Wimbledon in the first round in her only event. Nonetheless, she moved up to No. 3 in the singles rankings after the tournament. With a higher seed, Stephens had a strong US Open series for the second consecutive year. She finished runner-up at the Canadian Open to Halep, her second high-level Premier final of the year. At the US Open, Stephens was unable to defend her title, losing to Anastasija Sevastova in the quarterfinals in a rematch of last year's meeting at this tournament in the same round.

For the second straight year, Stephens began the Asian hardcourt season with multiple losses. However, unlike the previous year, Stephens was able to win two matches on the continent at the China Open. She then closed out the season by participating in her first WTA Finals in Singapore. In the round robin stage, Stephens swept her group of Naomi Osaka, Kiki Bertens, and Angelique Kerber to advance to the knockout stage. After a dismal start in the semifinals where she lost the first eight games of the match against Karolína Plíšková, she recovered and won the match in three sets. In her final match of the season, Stephens was able to win the first set against Elina Svitolina, but ultimately lost the match. She finished the season ranked No. 6 in the world, her best year-end ranking to date.

=== 2019: Loss of form ===
Stephens struggled throughout the 2019 season. Although she remained in the top 10 for the majority of the year in large part due to ranking points she was defending from the previous year's WTA Finals, she could not match her best performances at the Grand Slam tournaments or other higher-level events. Two of her biggest improvements came at two Grand Slam events. Stephens reached the fourth round at the Australian Open, securing her first match wins at the tournament since 2014. She also reached the third round at Wimbledon, despite having lost her previous two opening round matches there. Her best Grand Slam performance was a quarterfinal loss to Johanna Konta at the French Open, where she could not defend her runner-up finish from the previous season. Konta also defeated her at Wimbledon. Stephens ended her Grand Slam season with an opening-round loss at the US Open to qualifier Anna Kalinskaya.

Outside of the majors, Stephens best performance also came on clay at the Madrid Open, a Premier Mandatory event. During the tournament, she reached the semifinals, where she lost to No. 7 Kiki Bertens. Aside from this tournament and the French Open, the only other event where she reached the quarterfinals was the Charleston Open at the start of the clay court season. Stephens fell out of the top 10 shortly before the US Open, and again afterwards. She fell out of the top 20 upon losing her 2018 WTA Finals rankings points near the end of the season.

=== 2020: Continued struggles with form ===
Stephens started her 2020 season at the Brisbane International. She lost in the first round to qualifier Liudmila Samsonova in three sets. At the first edition of the Adelaide International, she was defeated in the first round in straight sets by world No. 201, Arina Rodionova. This was her first loss to a player outside the top 200 since 2011. Seeded 24th at the Australian Open, she was eliminated in the first round by Zhang Shuai, despite serving for the match in the second set.

As the top seed in Acapulco, Stephens was beaten in the first round by world No. 270, Renata Zarazúa. Seeded fifth at the Monterrey Open, she got her first victory of the year by beating compatriot, Emma Navarro, in the first round. She fell in the second round to Leylah Fernandez. After Monterrey, the WTA Tour was suspended from the rest of March through July due to the COVID-19 pandemic.

When the WTA Tour resumed tournament play in August, Stephens competed at the first edition of the Lexington Challenger. Seeded seventh, she lost in the first round to qualifier Leylah Fernandez. At the Cincinnati Open, she was defeated in the first round by Caroline Garcia. This loss brought her record for the year to 1-7. She showed an improvement in form at the US Open. Seeded 26th, she won her opening two matches in straight sets before losing in the third round to third seed and six-time champion Serena Williams. This match garnered a lot of praise from tennis experts.

After the US Open, Stephens competed at the Italian Open. She was eliminated in the first round by ninth seed Garbiñe Muguruza. Seeded eighth in Strasbourg, she was beaten in the first round by Nao Hibino. Seeded 29th at the French Open, she lost in the second round to Paula Badosa.

Stephens ended the year with a 4–11 record and ranked 39.

=== 2021: French Open fourth round, out of top 50 ===
Stephens started her season at the first edition of the Grampians Trophy where she lost in the first round to Leylah Fernandez. At the Australian Open, she was defeated in the first round by 26th seed and world No. 28, Yulia Putintseva. Seeded ninth at the first edition of the Phillip Island Trophy, she suffered a first round loss at the hands of Varvara Gracheva.

Stephens losing streak continued at the Monterrey Open. As the top seed, she was eliminated in the first round by lucky loser and world No. 151, Kristína Kučová. In Miami, she earned her first win of the season by defeating qualifier, Océane Dodin, in the first round. She was beaten in her second-round match by 28th seed and compatriot, Amanda Anisimova.

Stephens began her clay-court season at the Charleston Open. She upset eighth seed, world No. 24, and 2019 champion, Madison Keys, in the second round. She ended up losing in the quarterfinals to 15th seed and eventual champion, Veronika Kudermetova. In Madrid, she was defeated in the second round by Ons Jabeur. At the Italian Open, she fell in the final round of qualifying to Tamara Zidanšek. However, she got a lucky loser spot into the main draw. She was eliminated in the first round by Madison Keys in three sets. At the first edition of the Emilia-Romagna Open, she reached the semifinals where she was beaten by sixth seed Wang Qiang. Ranked 59 at the French Open, she stunned ninth seed and world No. 10, Karolína Plíšková, in the second round. She lost in her fourth-round match to eventual champion Barbora Krejčíková.

Ranked 73 at Wimbledon, Stephens upset tenth seed and two-time champion, Petra Kvitová, in the first round. She was defeated in the third round by Liudmila Samsonova, in three sets.

In August, Stephens played at the Silicon Valley Classic. She was eliminated in the second round by compatriot, seventh seed, and eventual champion, Danielle Collins. In Montreal, she was beaten in the second round by top seed and world No. 3, Aryna Sabalenka. At the Western & Southern Open in Cincinnati, she lost in the first round to qualifier Caroline Garcia. Ranked 66 at the US Open, she won a tight three-set first-round match over 2017 finalist Madison Keys. She was defeated in the third round by 16th seed and 2016 champion, Angelique Kerber.

At the first edition of the Chicago Fall Classic, Stephens was eliminated in the first round by 13th seed Tamara Zidanšek. In Indian Wells, she was beaten in the second round by 19th seed and compatriot, Jessica Pegula. In November, she played for the U.S. team at the Billie Jean King Cup Finals. In the first tie, Slovakia beat the USA 2–1. She beat Nuria Párrizas Díaz during the tie against Spain. The USA won the tie over Spain 2-1 to advance to the semifinals. In the semifinals tie against Russia, she lost her match to Liudmila Samsonova. In the end, Russia beat the USA 2–1 to advance to the final.

Stephens ended the year ranked No. 64.

=== 2022: First title since 2018, third French Open quarterfinal ===
Stephens started her 2022 season at the Australian Open. She lost in the first round to 17th seed and world No. 18, Emma Raducanu, in three sets.

In February, Stephens competed at the Abierto Zapopan in Guadalajara, Mexico. Seeded sixth, she won her seventh WTA singles title by beating Marie Bouzková in the final. This was her first final and title since 2018. Next, she was supposed to play against Egypt's Mayar Sherif in the Monterrey first round; however, she withdrew from the tournament. At the Indian Wells Open, she fell in the first round to 2018 champion Naomi Osaka. In Miami, she lost in the second round to 16th seed and world No. 21, Jessica Pegula.

Stephens started her clay-court season at the Charleston Open. Seeded 13th, she lost in the first round to Zheng Qinwen. At the Madrid Open, she was defeated in the first round by Anhelina Kalinina, and in Rome, she was eliminated in the first round by Ekaterina Alexandrova. Seeded sixth at the Internationaux de Strasbourg, she was stunned in the first round by world No. 306 and lucky loser, Nefisa Berberović, in three sets. At the French Open, she upset 26th seed, Sorana Cîrstea, in the second round. She reached the quarterfinals for the first time since 2019 by defeating 23rd seed and world No. 24, Jil Teichmann, in the fourth round, before she was defeated by 18th seed and eventual finalist, Coco Gauff. Due to her quarterfinal result at Roland Garros, her ranking improved from 64 to 47.

At the Bad Homburg Open, her first grass-court tournament of the season, Stephens was beaten in the first round by British qualifier Katie Swan. At Wimbledon, she lost in the first round again to Zheng Qinwen.

Stephens started her US Open Series at Washington, D.C. where she lost in round one to Ajla Tomljanović. This was her first loss to Tomljanović, having led their head-to-head 6-0. In Toronto, she was defeated in the second round by third seed and world No. 4, Maria Sakkari. At the Western & Southern Open in Cincinnati, she lost in the second round to world No. 1, Iga Świątek. Ranked 51 at the US Open, she lost again in the second round to eventual champion Świątek.

Two weeks after the US Open, Stephens played at the Emilia-Romagna Open. Seeded fourth, she overcame a bee sting to beat Magdalena Fręch in the first round before she lost in the second round to Danka Kovinić, in three sets.

=== 2023: Ninth French Open fourth round ===
Stephens started her season at the Auckland Open. Seeded second, she lost in the first round to qualifier and eventual finalist, Rebeka Masarova. Seeded fourth at the Hobart International, she was defeated in the first round by qualifier, compatriot, and eventual champion, Lauren Davis. At the Australian Open, she lost in the first round to Anastasia Potapova.

Seeded second at the first edition of the Mérida Open in Mexico, Stephens got her first win of the year by beating qualifier Léolia Jeanjean in the first round. She was double bageled in her quarterfinal match by eventual champion, Camila Giorgi. Seeded fifth at the first edition of the ATX Open in Austin, Texas, she reached the quarterfinals where she lost to eventual finalist Varvara Gracheva. In March, she competed at the Indian Wells Open. She was knocked out of the tournament in the first round by compatriot Sofia Kenin.

At the French Open, she reached the fourth round for the ninth time at this major defeating 16th seed Karolina Plíšková, Varvara Gracheva and Yulia Putintseva, before losing to second seed Aryna Sabalenka.

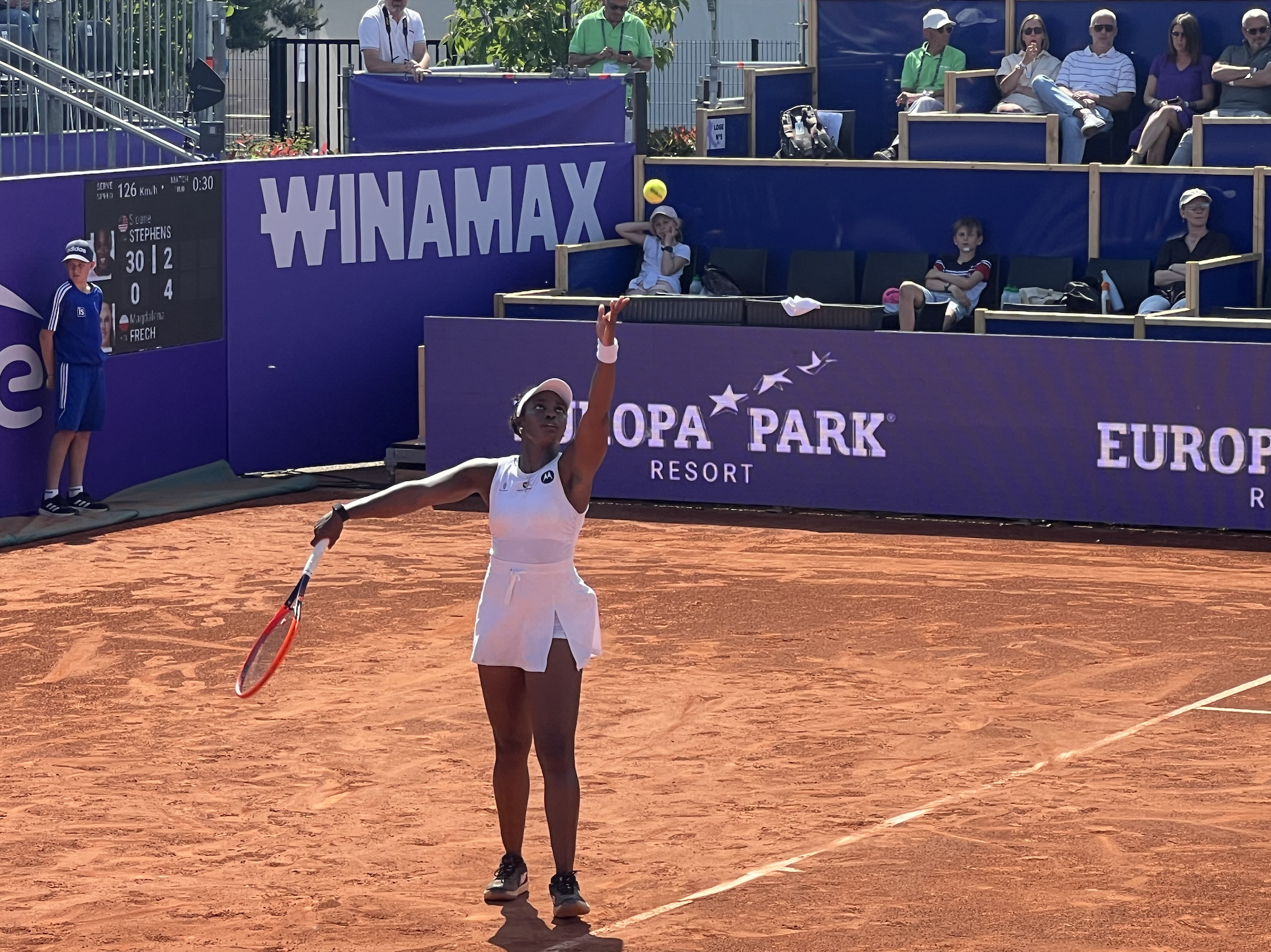
Stephens serving in Strasbourg in 2024.

=== 2024: First WTA doubles, eighth singles titles ===
At the Australian Open, Stephens recorded wins over wildcard entrant Olivia Gadecki and Daria Kasatkina, before losing to Anna Kalinskaya in the third round.

She defeated Mayar Sherif and 19th seed Sorana Cîrstea to make it through to the third round at the WTA 1000 event in Indian Wells, at which point her run was ended by 11th seed Daria Kasatkina.

Teaming up with Ashlyn Krueger as wildcard entrants, Stephens won her first WTA Tour doubles title at the Charleston Open in April, defeating sisters Lyudmyla and Nadiia Kichenok in the final. Two weeks later she won her eighth WTA Tour singles title at the Rouen Open, overcoming Magda Linette in the final, having registered wins over second seed Caroline Garcia in the semifinals and fourth seed Yuan Yue in the last eight.

At the Madrid Open, Stephens defeated Martina Trevisan and 28th seed Elise Mertens, before losing to fifth seed Maria Sakkari in the third round. She lost in the first round at the French Open to Yulia Putintseva.

Stephens overcame lucky loser Elsa Jacquemot to reach the second round at Wimbledon, at which point she lost to Diana Shnaider. At the US Open, she was eliminated in the first round by Clara Burel in three sets.

=== 2025–26: Out of top 700, comeback ===
After her first-round loss to defending champion Aryna Sabalenka at the 2025 Australian Open, Stephens did not appear on the WTA Tour between February and September.

She made her return at the 2025 Guadalajara Open Akron, where she lost in the opening round to Italian Lucrezia Stefanini, in a match that stretched over two days due to rain interruptions.

In December 2025, Stephens received a wildcard for the 2026 ASB Classic, where she lost in the first round to Renata Zarazúa in three sets.

She qualified for the 2026 Australian Open, but was again eliminated in the opening round, losing to Karolína Plíšková.

Ranked No. 717 and playing as a wildcard entrant, Stephens won her first WTA main-draw match for almost two years when she defeated fellow wildcard entry and world No. 744, Jennifer Brady, at the 2026 Miami Open. This was the first WTA 1000 main-draw match between two players both ranked outside the world's top-500. She lost in the second round to 23rd seed Zheng Qinwen in straight sets.

At the 2026 Charleston Open, once again playing as a wildcard entrant, Stephens lost to Renata Zarazúa in the first round, winning just two games in the match. Having moved up to world No. 552 and benefitting from another wildcard entry into the main-draw at the 2026 Linz Open, Stephens defeated Tatjana Maria, before losing to top seed Mirra Andreeva in the second round. Ranked No. 361, Stephens qualified for the main draw at the 2026 French Open, but lost to Sara Bejlek in the first round.

Given a wildcard entry into the main-draw at the 2026 Memphis Classic, she overcame eighth seed Yuliia Starodubtseva to reach the second round, where she lost to Darja Vidmanova. Stephens qualified for the main-draw at the 2026 Canadian Open and defeated Solana Sierra, before losing to 12th seed Belinda Bencic in the second round. As a wildcard entrant at the 2026 Cincinnati Open, she recorded wins over qualifier Sinja Kraus and 24th seed Anastasia Potapova to make it through to the third round, at which point she lost to 10th seed Marta Kostyuk. Given a wildcard entry into the main-draw at the 2026 US Open, Stephens defeated Clara Tauson for her first win at her home major since 2022, before losing to 11th seed Marta Kostyuk in the second round. At the 2026 Guadalajara Open, once more participating thanks to a wildcard, she registered wins over qualifier Carole Monnet and fifth seed Janice Tjen to reach the quarterfinals, where her run was ended by Peyton Stearns.

== World TeamTennis ==
Stephens has played five seasons with World TeamTennis starting in 2009 when she debuted in the league with the New York Buzz, followed by a season each with the Washington Kastles in 2014, the Philadelphia Freedoms in 2017 and 2018, and the New York Empire in 2019. It was announced that she will joining the Chicago Smash for their debut season, during the 2020 WTT season set to begin July 12 at The Greenbrier.

Stephens played singles for the Smash throughout the season, helping them to earn a No. 2 seed in the WTT Playoffs. Chicago defeated the Orlando Storm to earn a spot in the final, but ultimately fell to the New York Empire in a supertiebreaker.

== Rivalries ==
=== Stephens vs. Keys ===
Stephens's biggest rivalry is with her close friend and compatriot Madison Keys. Keys has said, "Sloane and I, since we were 12 and 14, have constantly been compared to each other." Both players have been ranked in the top 10 by the WTA. They have also both been labelled as leaders of the next generation of American women's tennis. In spite of their rivalry, the two have looked forward to their matchups, with Stephens saying, "Every time I get to play Maddy is great. Another opportunity for the both of us." Keys has said, "I always want to see Sloane do well. I'd love for both of us to be able to be in the position to play each other multiple times. ... I'm always cheering for her."

Stephens has a 5–2 record against Madison Keys, winning their first three matches in straight sets. After their first meeting in the second round of the 2015 Miami Open, their next two encounters were both two of the most important matches of their careers. In 2017, Stephens defeated Keys in the final of the US Open to win her first major title. She then won their next meeting in the semifinals of the 2018 French Open to reach her second Grand Slam singles final. Keys defeated Stephens for the first time in the quarterfinals of the 2019 Charleston Open. Stephens avenged her Charleston Open defeat in 2021, beating Keys in straight sets in the 2nd round. But Keys prevailed at the 2021 Italian Open a month later. They played for a third time in 2021 at the US Open and Sloane prevailed in a third set tiebreak.

=== Stephens vs. Serena Williams ===
Stephens had frequently been regarded as a potential successor to Serena Williams to become the next top American women's tennis player, if not the best in the world. She grew up as a fan of the Williams sisters but had lost some of her interest in them after they did not sign autographs at a Fed Cup tie that Stephens attended at age 12. She considered them to be friends when she was starting out on the pro tour but described Serena as simply a colleague in early 2015. Her relationship with Serena became strained after their match at the 2013 Australian Open. Following Stephens's victory against her at the tournament, Serena commented, "I made you," in a tweet believed to be directed at Stephens and did not speak to her younger compatriot until at least May. Nonetheless Stephens has said the two of them still had a good relationship.

Stephens has a 1–6 record against Serena Williams, with three of their matches in 2013, another three in 2015, and one in 2020. Her only victory against Serena came at the 2013 Australian Open when she was still relatively unknown as a 19-year-old. The match win and her run into a Grand Slam singles semifinal garnered international attention and put her on the cusp of cracking the top 10 of the WTA rankings later in the season. With Serena entering the match in excellent form and also having defeated her much younger opponent earlier that month, Stephens was listed as high as a 16-to-1 underdog. All of their matches since have been contested at high-level Premier tournaments or Grand Slam tournaments. In 2015 Stephens won the first set of their encounters at the Indian Wells Open and the French Open but ultimately lost in three sets in both instances.

=== Stephens vs. Halep ===
Stephens and Halep have built a rivalry centered around their highest profile matches in 2018. Because Halep has dominated their matches, Stephens has downplayed their rivalry, saying, "It's not a rivalry if you don't beat the person." International Tennis Hall of Famer Chris Evert has praised their rivalry, saying, "I liked [their match in the 2018 Canadian Open final] a lot, because that is a contrast in personalities and styles, in moods, in coaches. That is a definite contest."

Stephens has a 2–7 record against Halep. Halep won their first encounter in 2012 at the Barcelona Ladies Open. Stephens then won their next two meetings in early 2013, including a first round match at the Australian Open as part of her breakthrough semifinal run at the event. Both of these wins came before Halep entered the top ten in 2014. Since then, Halep has won all six of their encounters. Their two biggest matches came in 2018, both of which were three set finals. In the first such match, the French Open final, Halep came from a set down to defeat Stephens for her first Grand Slam title. This was only the fourth time in the previous 47 Grand Slam singles finals where the winner of the first set was unable to win the match. Their next big match, the final at the Canadian Open, was ranked as the match of the year by the WTA. Halep won the first set of the match after saving four set points, two while serving at 6–5 and two more in the tiebreak. After Stephens was able to push the match to three sets Halep was able to regroup and win the match. Prior to these finals, Stephens had never lost a final on the WTA Tour.

== Playing style ==
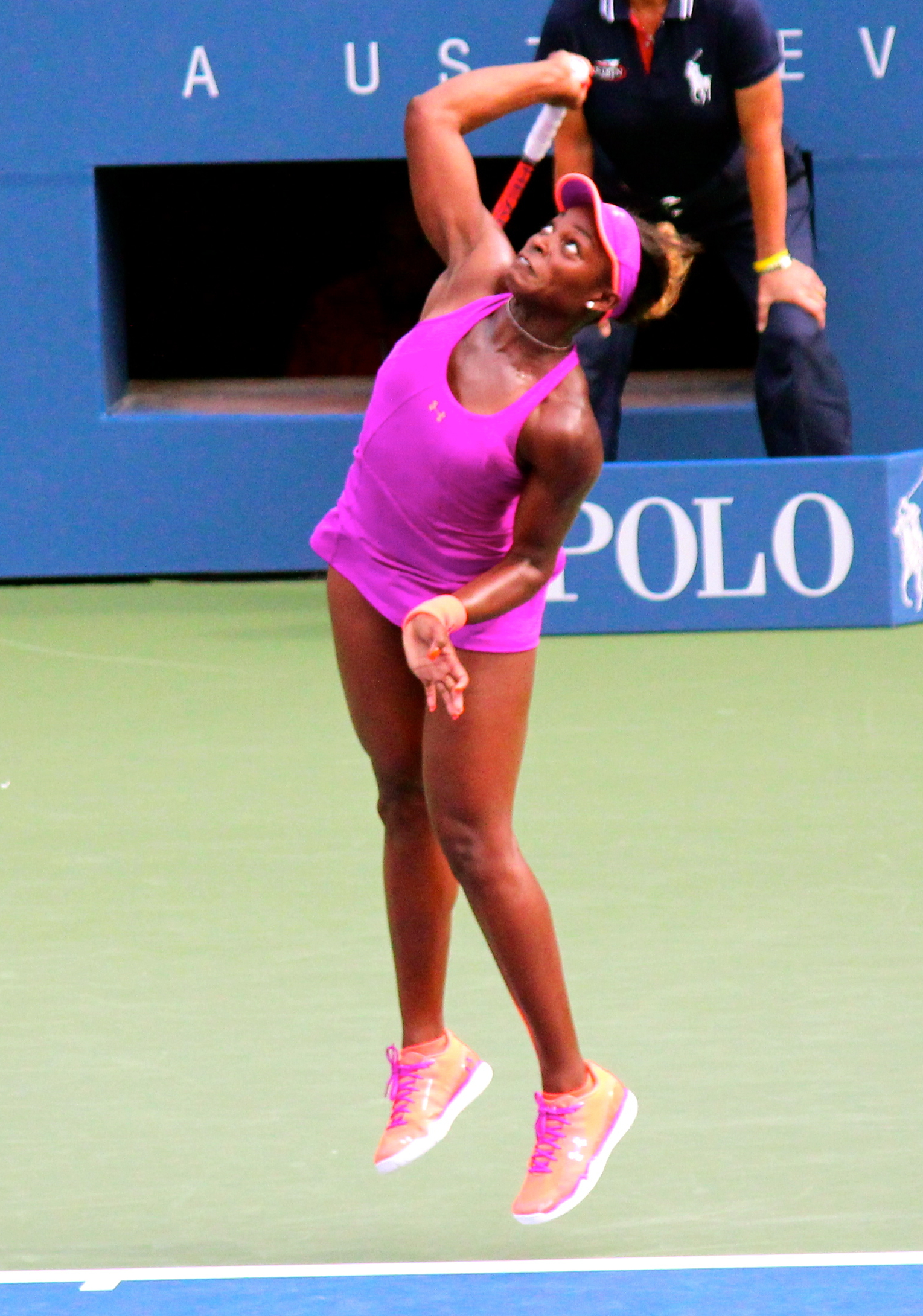
Stephens serving

Stephens is an all-court player, having reached the quarterfinals or better at all four majors. Her favorite surface is clay, on which she was a finalist at the French Open. However, most of her best results have come on hard courts, including her US Open and Miami Open titles, as well as six of her seven titles in total. She has never won a professional title on grass, and Wimbledon is the only Grand Slam event where she has not made it to at least the semifinals.

Stephens often plays behind the baseline, relying on her athleticism to defend against her opponent's shots. She excels at countering powerfully-hit shots, and is capable of turning defense into offense. Stephens also is a proficient server: she can hit first serves as fast as 110–115 miles per hour and is capable of employing both first and second serves with a flat, sliced, or kick serve approach. Her game is commonly referred to as possessing "easy power" due to the seemingly casual nature in which she injects pace into her shots. She sometimes flattens out her shots, even on the run, and goes for stinging winners. Stephens has the ability to hit powerful winners as she takes large swings with her forehand. In contrast, she has a more compact swing with her two-handed backhand. She favors her forehand, and will run around her backhand at times to play her stronger groundstroke. Stephens excels in point construction, and varies patterns of hitting in order to confuse opponents.

Stephens has an uncharacteristic style of play compared to her fellow top-ranked American contemporaries. Whereas the other leading Americans are some of the most aggressive players on the WTA Tour, Stephens has a more passive approach. According to the Aggression Score Metric, which measures a player's aggression based on how quickly they end points — either through a winner, an unforced error, or an opponent's forced error, Stephens has a score of 19.4% — which implies that 19.4% of her shots lead to one of those three outcomes. This score is average compared to other women's tennis players, and rates similarly to fellow Grand Slam tournament winners Justine Henin and Victoria Azarenka. In contrast, Venus Williams is amongst the top 20% of most aggressive players, while Serena Williams, Madison Keys, and CoCo Vandeweghe are all in the top 10% with aggression scores above 25%.

Stephens has been perceived as having a nonchalant attitude towards losing matches and striving to meet expectations. Her former junior coach Chris Evert has questioned her motivation on multiple occasions and attributed stretches of inconsistency at various times in her career to her mentality. On the contrary, Stephens has also shown the ability to use her mindset of not worrying about disappointing outcomes to bounce back from injury and poor tournaments. She demonstrated this type of mindset after her early 2014 US Open loss, saying, "I'm not gonna dwell on this. I'm just gonna keep improving and getting better and looking forward to the next tournaments."

== Coaches ==
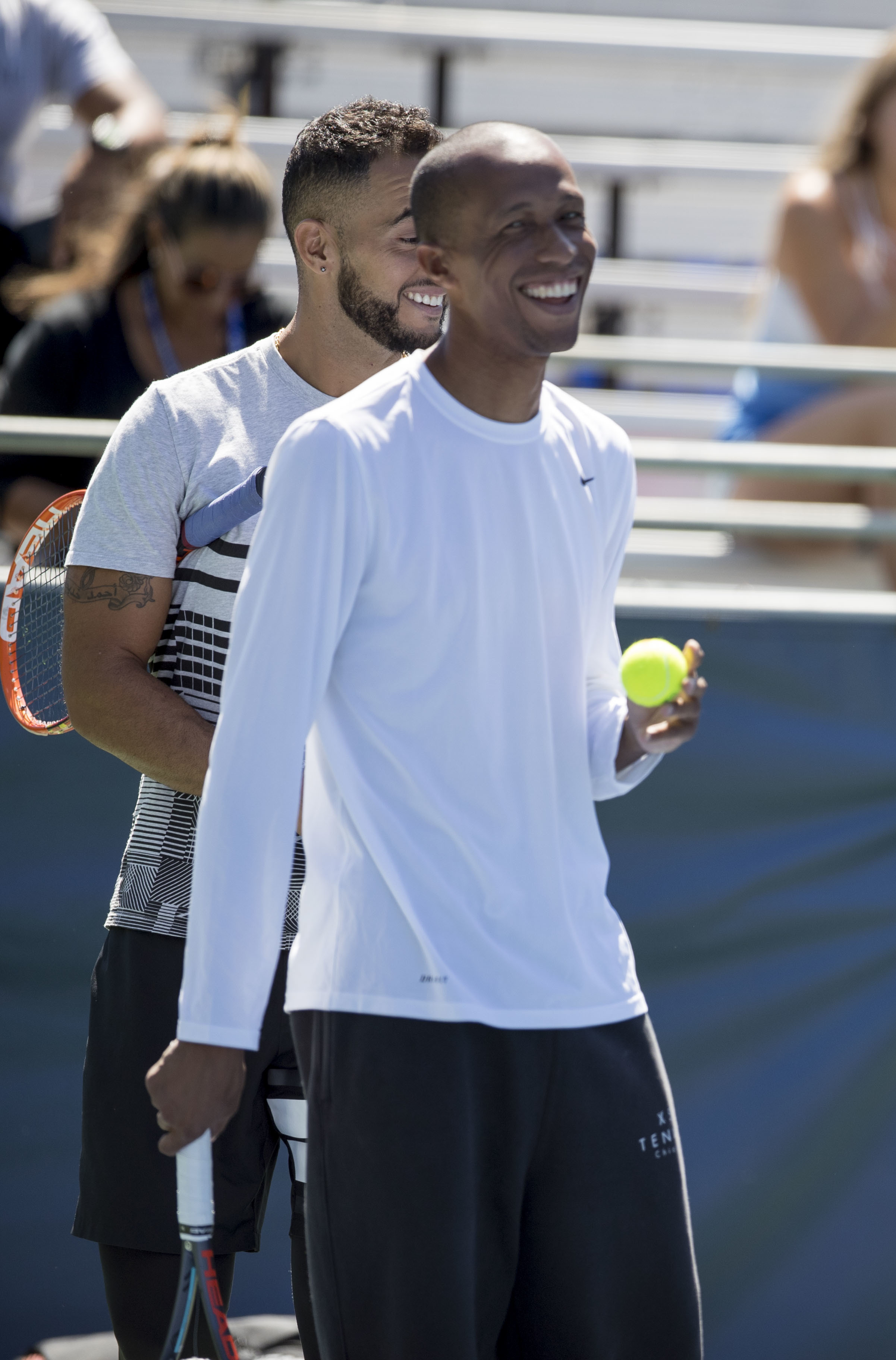
Kamau Murray, Stephens's longterm coach

When Stephens was just starting to play tennis at the Sierra Sport and Racquet Club, one of her first instructors was Francisco González, a retired professional tennis player once ranked in the top 50. Upon his recommendation, Stephens moved to Florida to train at an elite junior tennis academy. Although she started out at the Evert Tennis Academy for a year working with John and Chris Evert, she then moved to the Nick Saviano High Performance Tennis Academy, where she stayed for several years.

Roger Smith began coaching Stephens in early 2009 and worked with her for several years. With Smith as her coach, she became a top-ranked junior with three Grand Slam tournament doubles titles and also cracked the top 100 of the WTA rankings. In June 2012, Stephens switched coaches to David Nainkin in order to try to qualify for the 2012 Olympics. Although her ranking was high enough to qualify, she narrowly missed out on that goal as she was the fifth-highest ranked American with each country only being allotted at most four players in each draw. Nonetheless, under Nainkin, Stephens had her breakthrough tournament at the 2013 Australian Open and reached a career-best ranking of No. 11 in the world. She parted with him after the 2013 season in order to find a full-time coach. Nainkin had also been working with fellow American Sam Querrey that year. Stephens replaced him with Paul Annacone, who is better known for coaching two of the greatest players in tennis history in Pete Sampras and Roger Federer. She became the first woman to be coached by Annacone. Although the pair worked well together, Stephens split with Annacone in late 2014 after not matching the success from her previous year that season.

Stephens briefly worked with Thomas Högstedt in late 2014. At the start of 2015, she returned to her longtime junior coach, Nick Saviano. While working with Saviano, Stephens won her first WTA title, but did not manage to ascend back up the WTA rankings. In the 2015 offseason, she replaced him with Kamau Murray. With Murray as her coach, Stephens established herself as one of the best players in women's tennis. She has since won five of her six titles, including three in 2016, her first major at the 2017 US Open, and her first Premier Mandatory title in 2018. She has also reached a new career-high ranking at No. 3 in the world. Stephens split with Murray during the 2018 offseason before reuniting with him in August 2019 shortly before the US Open. In Murray's absence, Stephens had worked with Sven Groeneveld for three months. She split with Murray in 2021 before the Miami Open and is working with ATP tennis player Darian King who is also her practice partner. Stephens and Murray have reunited and continue to work together in 2026.

== Endorsements ==
Stephens is represented by GSE Worldwide.

Her clothing sponsor from 2010 was Under Armour and in early 2018 she signed with Nike. At the 2021 French Open, she wore a striking all-black outfit, despite the heat.

Stephens uses Head rackets, specifically endorsing the Speed line as of January 2023.

After her US Open victory, Stephens accrued several new sponsors, including Mercedes-Benz. She has appeared in television advertisements for Built with Chocolate Milk, a campaign to encourage chocolate milk as a recovery drink. Her other health-related endorsements include doTerra, Precision Nutrition, and Colgate. doTerra is a company that primarily sells essential oils, while Precision Nutrition provides coaching for diet and exercise. With Colgate, Stephens is a part of their Bright Smiles, Bright Futures campaign that focuses on educating children about oral hygiene.

Stephens has previously signed a deal with the American Express credit card company and was formerly an endorser of the Listerine mouthwash product. She was also a brand ambassador for USANA, a nutrition company. Moreover, Stephens has worked with Time Warner Cable as part of their Connect a Million Minds campaign to motivate the importance of education in science, technology, engineering, and math (STEM) fields.

== Personal life ==
Stephens credits her mother for supporting her career as a tennis player since she was very young. When she won the 2017 US Open, she recalled an instance at age 11 when her mother believed Stephens had high upside in spite of being told by an instructor at a junior tennis academy that she would be lucky to get a tennis scholarship to a Division II college. Stephens is of Trinidadian descent through her maternal grandfather Noel Smith, who came to the United States from Trinidad to pursue a career as a doctor. She has cited her grandfather as her hero and one of her biggest influences growing up.

Her favorite player growing up was Kim Clijsters, who congratulated Stephens in person after her 2017 US Open title. She was also a fan of the Williams sisters and kept a poster of Serena in her bedroom as a kid. Although she disliked that they were uninterested in signing autographs at a match she attended and has also commented that neither of them tried to serve as one of her mentors, Stephens has stated she developed a good relationship with the Williams sisters. She also noted that she has read Serena's autobiography and respects her strong personality.

Stephens has worked with Soles4Souls, a charity that collects new and used shoes to give to children in poverty. She also started the Sloane Stephens Foundation, which helps build tennis courts and set up after-school tennis programs for underserved students in conjunction with supplemental tutoring. The foundation is run by Stephens, her mother, and her uncle Ronald Smith. They have organized programs in Compton, Fresno, and Fort Lauderdale.

Stephens married United States national soccer team player Jozy Altidore, who was also one of her childhood friends in Florida, on January 1, 2022. She had previously dated fellow American tennis player Jack Sock for over a year. In a social media post on February 21, 2026, Stephens announced she and Altidore had decided to end their marriage.

In late 2017, Stephens graduated from Indiana University East with a bachelor's degree in communications studies. She finished her degree while recovering from foot surgery earlier in the year. She credits her time away from playing tennis that was spent on her studies and her job with the Tennis Channel for improving her perspective on being a professional tennis player. Stephens received a Master of Business Administration degree in December 2020 from DeVry University. She is currently working on her Doctor of Business Administration at Keiser University.

== Career statistics ==
=== Grand Slam tournament finals ===
==== Singles: 2 (1 title, 1 runner-up) ====
Result	Year	Championship	Surface	Opponent	Score
Win	2017	US Open	Hard	(United States) Madison Keys	6–3, 6–0
Loss	2018	French Open	Clay	(Romania) Simona Halep	6–3, 4–6, 1–6

=== Year-end championships ===
==== Singles: 1 (runner-up) ====
Result	Year	Championship	Surface	Opponent	Score
Loss	2018	WTA Finals, Singapore	Hard (i)	(Ukraine) Elina Svitolina	6–3, 2–6, 2–6

=== Singles performance timeline ===
Key
W	F	SF	QF	#R	RR	Q#	DNQ	A	NH

(W) winner; (F) finalist; (SF) semifinalist; (QF) quarterfinalist; (#R) rounds 4, 3, 2, 1; (RR) round-robin stage; (Q#) qualification round; (DNQ) did not qualify; (A) absent; (NH) not held; (SR) strike rate (events won / competed); (W–L) win–loss record.
To avoid confusion and double counting, these charts are updated at the conclusion of a tournament or when the player's participation has ended.

Current through the 2026 Wimbledon Championships.

Tournament	2008	2009	2010	2011	2012	2013	2014	2015	2016	2017	2018	2019	2020	2021	2022	2023	2024	2025	2026	SR	W−L	Win %
Grand Slam tournaments
Australian Open	A	A	A	Q2	2R	SF	4R	1R	1R	A	1R	4R	1R	1R	1R	1R	3R	1R	1R	0 / 14	14–14	50%
French Open	A	A	A	1R	4R	4R	4R	4R	3R	A	F	QF	2R	4R	QF	4R	1R	A	1R	0 / 14	35–14	71%
Wimbledon	A	A	A	Q2	3R	QF	1R	3R	3R	1R	1R	3R	NH	3R	1R	2R	2R	A	A	0 / 12	16–12	57%
US Open	Q2	Q1	Q2	3R	3R	4R	2R	1R	A	W	QF	1R	3R	3R	2R	1R	1R	A	2R	1 / 14	25–13	66%
Win–loss	0–0	0–0	0–0	2–2	8–4	15–4	7–4	5–4	4–3	7–1	10–4	9–4	3–3	7–4	5–4	4–4	3–4	0–1	0–2	1 / 54	90–53	63%
Career statistics
Titles	0	0	0	0	0	0	0	1	3	1	1	0	0	0	1	0	0	0		Career total: 7		
Finals	0	0	0	0	0	0	0	1	3	1	4	0	0	0	1	0	0	0		Career total: 10		
Year-end ranking	496	802	198	97	38	12	36	30	36	13	6	25	39	64	37	48	79	1062		$19,024,196		
