= NCAA Division I women's tennis championships =

American college sports tournament

- Current season, competition or edition: 2026 NCAA Division I Women's Tennis Championships
- Association: NCAA
- Sport: College tennis
- Founded: 1982; 44 years ago
- Division: Division I
- No. of teams: 64
- Country: United States
- Most recent champions: Team: Texas A&M (2nd); Singles: Reese Brantmeier, North Carolina; Doubles: Gabbi Broadfoot and Tori Osuigwe, NC State
- Most titles: Team: Stanford (20); Singles Stanford (14); Doubles: Stanford (8)
- Website: NCAA.com

The NCAA Division I women's tennis championships are contested at an annual tournament hosted by the National Collegiate Athletic Association to determine the national champions of women's team, singles, and doubles collegiate tennis among its Division I members in the United States. It has been organized by the NCAA every year since 1982, except for 2020.

Stanford has been the most successful program across all three events (singles, doubles, and team).

Texas A&M is the reigning team national champions, winning their second national title in 2026.

The Division I NCAA team tournament was expanded to 64 teams in 1999.

== History ==
Tennis was one of twelve women's sports added to the NCAA championship program for the 1981–82 school year, as the NCAA engaged in battle with the Association for Intercollegiate Athletics for Women for sole governance of women's collegiate sports. The AIAW continued to conduct its established championship program in the same twelve (and other) sports; however, after a year of dual women's championships, the NCAA outlasted the AIAW to gain sole authority over women's sports.

== Results ==
=== Pre-NCAA sponsorship (1922–1981) ===
Pre-NCAA Women's Tennis Championships
Year	Site	Court	Singles Champion	Doubles Champions
1922	Painesville, OH	Lake Erie College	Evelyn Ennes (Lake Erie College)	—
1929	Chestnut Hill, MA	Longwood Cricket Club	Midge Gladman (USC)	Midge Gladman (USC) / Josephine Cruickshank (California)
1930	Chestnut Hill, MA	Longwood Cricket Club	Josephine Cruickshank (California)	Josephine Cruickshank (2) (California) / Dorrance Chase (Simmons)
1931	Chestnut Hill, MA	Longwood Cricket Club	Mary Greef (USC)	Mary Greef (USC) / Charlotte Miller (California)
1932	Chestnut Hill, MA	Longwood Cricket Club	Marjorie Sachs (Simmons)	Marjorie Sachs / Dorrance Chase (2) (Simmons)
1933	Chestnut Hill, MA	Longwood Cricket Club	Mary Cutter (Jackson College for Women)	Mary Cutter (Jackson College for Women) / Emily Lincoln (Smith)
1934	Chestnut Hill, MA	Longwood Cricket Club	Kay Pearson (Rice)	Kay Pearson (Rice) / Margaret Haskell (Bryn Mawr)
1935	Chestnut Hill, MA	Longwood Cricket Club	Beth Lancaster (Florida State)	Mary Cutter (2) (Jackson College for Women) / Marion Wood (Smith College)
1936	Chestnut Hill, MA	Longwood Cricket Club	Patricia Henry (Occidental)	Patricia Henry (Occidental) / Louise Hedlund (Lasell Junior College)
1937	Chestnut Hill, MA	Longwood Cricket Club	Patricia Henry (2) (Occidental)	Patricia Henry (2) (Occidental) / Virginia Hitt (Lake Erie College)
1938	Chestnut Hill, MA	Longwood Cricket Club	Louise Raymond (Smith)	Marion Wood (2) / Nancy Zinsser (Smith)
1939	Chestnut Hill, MA	Longwood Cricket Club	Louise Raymond (2) (Smith)	Louise Raymond (Smith) / Christine Waples (Bryn Mawr)
1940	Chestnut Hill, MA	Longwood Cricket Club	Katharine Hubbell (Vassar)	Katharine Hubbell (Vassar) / Mercedes Madden (Lake Erie College)
1941	Chestnut Hill, MA	Longwood Cricket Club	Katharine Hubbell (2) (Vassar)	Katharine Hubbell (2) (Vassar) / Barbara Brandt (Smith)
1942	Chestnut Hill, MA	Longwood Cricket Club	Katharine Hubbell (3) (Vassar)	Katharine Hubbell (3) / Carolyn "Lonny" Myers (Vassar)
1943	Chestnut Hill, MA	Longwood Cricket Club	Judy Atterbury (Wellesley)	Judy Atterbury (Wellesley) / Norma Meister (Oglethorpe)
1944	Chestnut Hill, MA	Longwood Cricket Club	Betty Rosenquest (Rollins)	Judy Atterbury (2) (Wellesley) / Norma Meister (2) (Oglethorpe)
1945	Chestnut Hill, MA	Longwood Cricket Club	Connie Clifton (Rollins)	Connie Clifton / Peggy Welch (Rollins)
1946	Chestnut Hill, MA	Longwood Cricket Club	Judy Atterbury (2) (Wellesley)	not listed
1947	Chestnut Hill, MA	Longwood Cricket Club	Betty Coumbe (William & Mary)	Esther McCarthy (Manhattanville) / Helen Smith (Teachers College of Connecticut)
1948	Chestnut Hill, MA	Longwood Cricket Club	Betty Coumbe (2) (William & Mary)	Ann Penniman / Alice Kieckhefer (Smith)
1949	Chestnut Hill, MA	Longwood Cricket Club	Marjory Norris (Rollins)	Marjory Norris (Rollins) / Marion Colwell (Bouvé)
1950	Chestnut Hill, MA	Longwood Cricket Club	Marjory Norris (2) (Rollins)	Marjory Norris (2) (Rollins) / Edythe Ann Sullivan (Framingham State)
1951	Chestnut Hill, MA	Longwood Cricket Club	Edythe Ann Sullivan (Framingham State)	not listed
1952	Chestnut Hill, MA	Longwood Cricket Club	Edythe Ann Sullivan (2) (Framingham State)	not listed
1953	Chestnut Hill, MA	Longwood Cricket Club	Mary Slaughter (Virginia)	Mary Slaughter (Virginia) / Ruth Jeffry (Bouvé)
1954	St. Louis, MO	Washington University	Janet Hopps (Seattle)	Jeanne Arth (College of St. Catherine) / Sally Reilly (College of Saint Teresa)
1955	St. Louis, MO	Washington University	Janet Hopps (2) (Seattle)	Janet Hopps (Seattle) / Jeanne Arth (2) (College of St. Catherine)
1956	St. Louis, MO	Washington University	Janet Hopps (3) (Seattle)	Janet Hopps (2) (Seattle) / Jeanne Arth (3) (College of St. Catherine)
1957	St. Louis, MO	Washington University	June Stack (Eastern Michigan)	June Stack (Eastern Michigan) / Jean Sorum (Wisconsin)
1958	St. Louis, MO	Washington University	Darlene Hard (Pomona College)	Erika Puetz (Webster) / Sue Metzger (St. Mary's (Indiana))
1959	St. Louis, MO	Washington University	Donna Floyd (William & Mary)	Joyce Pniewski (Michigan State) / Phyllis Saganski (Central Michigan)
1960	St. Louis, MO	Washington University	Linda Vail (Oakland City College)	Linda Vail (Oakland City College) / Susan Butt (British Columbia)
1961	St. Louis, MO	Washington University	Tory Ann Fretz (Occidental)	Tory Ann Fretz (Occidental) / Mary Sherar (Yakima Valley JC)
1962	St. Louis, MO	Washington University	Roberta Alison (Alabama)	Carol Hanks / Linda Yeomans (Stanford)
1963	St. Louis, MO	Washington University	Roberta Alison (2) (Alabama)	Roberta Alison (Alabama) / Justina Bricka (Washington University)
1964	Greensboro, NC		Jane Albert (Stanford)	Carol Loop / Connie Jaster (Cal State LA)
1965	Greensboro, NC		Mimi Henreid (UCLA)	Nancy Falkenberg / Cynthia Goeltz (Mary Baldwin)
1966	Palo Alto, CA	Stanford University	Cecilia Martinez (San Francisco State)	Libby Weiss / Yale Stockwell (USC)
1967	Palo Alto, CA	Stanford University	Patsy Rippy (Odessa JC)	Jane Albert / Julie Anthony (Stanford)
1968	Northfield, MN		Emilie Burrer (Trinity (Texas))	Emilie Burrer / Becky Vest (Trinity)
1969	Northfield, MN		Emilie Burrer (2) (Trinity (Texas))	Emilie Burrer (2) / Becky Vest (2) (Trinity)
1970	Albuquerque, NM		Laura DuPont (North Carolina)	Connie Capozzi / Pam Farmer (Odessa JC)
1971	Las Cruces, NM		Pam Richmond (Arizona State)	Pam Richmond / Peggy Michel (Arizona State)
1972	Auburn, AL	Auburn University	Janice Metcalf (Redlands)	Pam Richmond (2) / Peggy Michel (2) (Arizona State)
1973	Auburn, AL	Auburn University	Janice Metcalf (2) (Redlands)	Cathy Beene / Linda Rupert (Lamar)
1974	Kalamazoo, MI	Western Michigan University	Carrie Meyer (Marymount (Florida))	Ann Lebedeff / Karen Reinke (San Diego State)
1975	Kalamazoo, MI	Western Michigan University	Stephanie Tolleson (Trinity (Texas))	JoAnne Russell / Donna Stockton (Trinity)
1976	Salt Lake City, UT	University of Utah	Barbara Hallquist (USC)	Diane Morrison / Susan Hagey (Stanford)
1977; USTA	Tempe, AZ	Arizona State University	Barbara Hallquist (2) (USC)	Jodi Appelbaum-Steinbauer / Terry Salganik (Miami)
1977; AIAW	Baton Rouge, LA	Louisiana State University	Lindsay Morse (UC Irvine)	Diane Morrison (2) / Susan Hagey (2) (Stanford)
1978; USTA	San Diego, CA		Stacy Margolin (USC)	Sherry Acker / Judy Acker (Florida)
1978; AIAW	Salisbury, MD	Salisbury State College	Jeanne DuVall (UCLA)	Kathy Jordan / Barbara Jordan (Stanford)
1979; AIAW	Iowa City, IA	University of Iowa	Kathy Jordan (Stanford)	Kathy Jordan (2) / Alycia Moulton (Stanford)
1980; AIAW	Baton Rouge, LA	Louisiana State University	Wendy White (Rollins)	Trey Lewis / Anne White (USC)
1981; AIAW	Phoenix, AZ		Anna Maria Fernandez (USC)	Alycia Moulton (2) / Caryn Copeland (Stanford)
1982; AIAW	Iowa City, IA	University of Iowa	Heather Crowe (Indiana)	Tracie Blumentritt / Susan Rudd (Rice)

=== NCAA sponsorship (1982–present) ===
NCAA Division I Women's Tennis Championship
Year	Site	Team Championship			Singles Champion	Doubles Champion
Year	Site	Champion	Score	Runner-up	Singles Champion	Doubles Champion
1982; Details	Salt Lake City, UT	Stanford	6–3	UCLA	Alycia Moulton (Stanford)	Heather Ludloff / Lynn Lewis (UCLA)
1983; Details	Albuquerque, NM	USC	8–1	Trinity (TX)	Beth Herr (USC)	Louise Allen / Gretchen Rush (Trinity–TX)
1984; Details	Los Angeles, CA	Stanford (2)	6–0	USC	Lisa Spain (Georgia)	Elise Burgin / Linda Gates (Stanford)
1985; Details	Oklahoma City, OK	USC (2)	6–3	Miami (FL)	Linda Gates (Stanford)	Leigh-Anne Eldredge / Linda Gates (Stanford)
1986; Details	Austin, TX	Stanford (3)	5–4	USC	Patty Fendick (Stanford)	Lise Gregory / Ronni Reis (Miami–FL)
1987; Details	Los Angeles, CA	Stanford (4)	5–1	Georgia	Patty Fendick (2) (Stanford)	Katrina Adams / Diane Donnelly (Northwestern)
1988; Details	Los Angeles, CA	Stanford (5)	5–2	Florida	Shaun Stafford (Florida)	Allison Cooper / Stella Sampras (UCLA)
1989; Details	Gainesville, FL	Stanford (6)	5–0	UCLA	Sandra Birch (Stanford)	Jackie Holden / Claire Pollard (Mississippi State)
1990; Details	Gainesville, FL	Stanford (7)	5–1	Florida	Debbie Graham (Stanford)	Meredith McGrath / Teri Whitlinger (Stanford)
1991; Details	Stanford, CA	Stanford (8)	5–1	UCLA	Sandra Birch(2) (Stanford)	Jillian Alexander / Nicole Arendt (Florida)
1992; Details	Stanford, CA	Florida	5–3	Texas	Lisa Raymond (Florida)	Mamie Ceniza / Iwalani McCalla (UCLA)
1993; Details	Gainesville, FL	Texas	5–2	Florida	Lisa Raymond (2) (Florida)	Alix Creek / Michelle Oldham (Arizona)
1994; Details	Athens, GA	Georgia	5–4	Stanford	Angela Lettiere (Georgia)	Rebecca Jensen / Nóra Köves (Kansas)
1995; Details	Malibu, CA	Texas (2)	5–4	Florida	Keri Phebus (UCLA)	Keri Phebus / Susie Starrett (UCLA)
1996; Details	Tallahassee, FL	Florida (2)	5–2	Stanford	Jill Craybas (Florida)	Dawn Buth / Stephanie Nickitas (Florida)
1997; Details	Stanford, CA	Stanford (9)	5–1	Florida	Lilia Osterloh (Stanford)	Dawn Buth / Stephanie Nickitas (Florida)
1998; Details	South Bend, IN	Florida (3)	5–1	Duke	Vanessa Webb (Duke)	Amanda Augustus / Amy Jensen (California)
1999; Details	Gainesville, FL	Stanford (10)	5–2	Florida	Zuzana Lešenarová (San Diego)	Amanda Augustus / Amy Jensen (California)
2000; Details	Malibu, CA	Georgia (2)	5–4	Stanford	Laura Granville (Stanford)	Claire Curran / Amy Jensen (California)
2001; Details	Atlanta, GA	Stanford (11)	4–0	Vanderbilt	Laura Granville (2) (Stanford)	Whitney Laiho / Jessica Lehnhoff (Florida)
2002; Details	Stanford, CA	Stanford (12)	4–1	Florida	Bea Bielik (Wake Forest)	Lauren Kalvaria / Gabriela Lastra (Stanford)
2003; Details	Gainesville, FL	Florida (4)	4–3	Stanford	Amber Liu (Stanford)	Christina Fusano / Raquel Kops-Jones (California)
2004; Details	Athens, GA	Stanford (13)	4–1	UCLA	Amber Liu (2) (Stanford)	Daniela Bercek /Lauren Fisher (UCLA)
2005; Details	Athens, GA	Stanford (14)	4–0	Texas	Zuzana Zemenová (Baylor)	Alice Barnes / Erin Burdette (Stanford)
2006; Details	Stanford, CA	Stanford (15)	4–1	Miami (FL)	Suzi Babos (California)	Cristelle Grier / Alexis Prousis (Northwestern)
2007; Details	Athens, GA	Georgia Tech	4–2	UCLA	Audra Cohen (Miami–FL)	Sara Anundsen / Jenna Long (North Carolina)
2008; Details	Tulsa, OK	UCLA	4–0	California	Amanda McDowell (Georgia Tech)	Tracy Lin / Riza Zalameda (UCLA)
2009; Details	College Station, TX	Duke	4–0	California	Mallory Cecil (Duke)	Mari Andersson / Jana Juricová (California)
2010; Details	Athens, GA	Stanford (16)	4–3	Florida	Chelsey Gullickson (Georgia)	Hilary Barte / Lindsay Burdette (Stanford)
2011; Details	Stanford, CA	Florida (5)	4–3	Stanford	Jana Juricova (California)	Hilary Barte / Mallory Burdette (Stanford)
2012; Details	Athens, GA	Florida (6)	4–0	UCLA	Nicole Gibbs (Stanford)	Mallory Burdette / Nicole Gibbs (Stanford)
2013; Details	Urbana, IL	Stanford (17)	4–3	Texas A&M	Nicole Gibbs (2) (Stanford)	Kaitlyn Christian / Sabrina Santamaria (USC)
2014; Details	Athens, GA	UCLA (2)	4–3	North Carolina	Danielle Collins (Virginia)	Maya Jansen / Erin Routliffe (Alabama)
2015; Details	Waco, TX	#4 Vanderbilt	4–2	#7 UCLA	Jamie Loeb (North Carolina)	Maya Jansen / Erin Routliffe(2) (Alabama)
2016; Details	Tulsa, OK	#15 Stanford (18)	4–3	#12 Oklahoma State	Danielle Collins (2) (Virginia)	Brooke Austin / Kourtney Keegan (Florida)
2017; Details	Athens, GA	#1 Florida (7)	4–1	#7 Stanford	Brienne Minor (Michigan)	Francesca Di Lorenzo / Miho Kowase (Ohio State)
2018; Details	Winston-Salem, NC	#15 Stanford (19)	4–3	#1 Vanderbilt	Arianne Hartono (Ole Miss)	Jessica Golovin / Eden Richardson (LSU)
2019; Details	Orlando, FL	#3 Stanford (20)	4–0	#1 Georgia	Estela Perez-Somarriba (Miami-FL)	Gabrielle Andrews / Ayan Broomfield (UCLA)
2020; Details	Stillwater, OK	Cancelled due to the coronavirus pandemic				
2021; Details	Orlando, FL	#2 Texas (3)	4–3	#5 Pepperdine	Emma Navarro (Virginia)	Makenna Jones / Elizabeth Scotty (North Carolina)
2022; Details	Champaign, IL	#4 Texas (4)	4–1	#2 Oklahoma	Peyton Stearns (Texas)	Jaeda Daniel / Nell Miller (NC State)
2023; Details	Orlando, FL	#1 North Carolina	4–1	#3 NC State	Tian Fangran (UCLA)	Fiona Crawley / Carson Tanguilig (North Carolina)
2024; Details	Stillwater, OK	#13 Texas A&M	4–1	#7 Georgia	Alexa Noel (Miami)	Aysegul Mert / Darja Vidmanová (Georgia)
2025; Details	Waco, TX	#1 Georgia	4–0	#2 Texas A&M	Darja Vidmanová (Georgia)	Melodie Collard / Elaine Chervinsky (Virginia)
2026; Details	Athens, GA	#4 Texas A&M (2)	4–1	#2 Auburn	Reese Brantmeier (North Carolina)	Gabbi Broadfoot / Tori Osuigwe (NC State)

== Champions ==
=== Team titles ===
School	Number	Year Won
Stanford	20	1982, 1984, 1986, 1987, 1988, 1989, 1990, 1991, 1997, 1999, 2001, 2002, 2004, 2005, 2006, 2010, 2013, 2016, 2018, 2019
Florida	7	1992, 1996, 1998, 2003, 2011, 2012, 2017
Texas	4	1993, 1995, 2021, 2022
Georgia	3	1994, 2000, 2025
Texas A&M	2	2024, 2026
UCLA	2	2008, 2014
USC	2	1983, 1985
North Carolina	1	2023
Duke	1	2009
Georgia Tech	1	2007
Vanderbilt	1	2015

=== Singles titles ===
Rank	Team	Titles
1	Stanford	14
2	Florida	4
2	Georgia	4
3	Virginia	3
4	California	2
4	Duke	2
4	Miami (FL)	2
4	North Carolina	2
4	Ole Miss	2
5	Baylor	1
5	Georgia Tech	1
5	Michigan	1
5	San Diego	1
5	USC	1
5	UCLA	1
5	Wake Forest	1

=== Doubles titles ===
Rank	Team	Titles
1	Stanford	8
2	UCLA	7
3	California	5
3	Florida	5
4	Alabama	2
4	North Carolina	2
4	NC State	2
4	LSU	2
4	Northwestern	2
5	Arizona	1
5	Kansas	1
5	Miami (FL)	1
5	Mississippi State	1
5	Ohio State	1
5	USC	1
5	Trinity (TX)	1
5	Virginia	1

- Schools highlighted in italics have reclassified to another NCAA division.

== Results by School and Year ==
Total columns

- School refers to the current name and branding of the tennis team.
- Conference shows where the school as of the 2025 season.
- # Total appearances in the NCAA Tournament since 1977, not counting vacated appearances.
- 16 Total appearances in the top 16 of the tournament
- QF Total appearances in the quarterfinals
- SF Total appearances in the semifinals
- RU Total appearances in the championship match
- CH National championships

Table entries

- CH National champion
- RU National runner-up
- SF Semifinals
- QF Quarterfinals
- 16 Round of 16
- 32 Round of 32 (1999 to present)
  - 20 Round of 20 (1988 to 1995)
- ✖ Round of 64 (1999 to present)
- From 1996 to 1998, 10 teams were selected to advance directly to the round of 16, while all other teams were placed into regional tournaments to determine the other six teams.
  - Rf Regional finals
  - Rs Regional semifinals
  - Rq Regional quarterfinals
- ~~16~~ USC's participation in the 2008 tournament was vacated by the NCAA. They are not credited for that year in the total columns.

From 1996 to 1998, the eight teams who advanced directly to the round of 16 are marked with an ^{x}. Since 1999, the top 16 teams have been seeded 1 through 16, and the seeds are marked in superscript.

- The exception to the seeding rule was 2000, when the top 16 teams were seeded in groups of 4, marked by these symbols: · : ⁝ ⁞

School	Conference	#	16	QF	SF	CM	CH	82	83	84	85	86	87	88	89	90	91	92	93	94	95	96	97	98	99	00	01	02	03	04	05	06	07	08	09	10	11	12	13	14	15	16	17	18	19	21	22	23	24	25	26
Stanford	ACC	44	42	39	34	27	20	CH	SF	CH	QF	CH	CH	CH	CH	CH	CH	SF	RU	RU	SF	^{x}RU	^{x}CH	^{x}SF	^{2}CH	·RU	^{1}CH	^{3}CH	^{1}RU	^{2}CH	^{1}CH	^{1}CH	^{1}SF	^{4}QF	^{13}16	^{8}CH	^{1}RU	^{4}QF	^{12}CH	^{11}SF	^{14}QF	^{15}CH	^{7}RU	^{15}CH	^{3}CH	32	^{15}16	^{7}SF	^{2}QF	16	32
Florida	SEC	42	36	30	25	14	7	16	16	QF	QF		SF	RU	SF	RU	SF	CH	SF	QF	RU	^{x}CH	^{x}RU	^{x}CH	^{1}RU	·SF	^{4}SF	^{1}RU	^{2}CH	^{1}32	^{2}SF	^{4}SF	^{4}QF	^{6}SF	^{15}16	^{3}RU	^{2}CH	^{2}CH	^{1}SF	^{8}SF	^{5}QF	^{2}16	^{1}CH	^{9}32	32	^{11}32	^{16}16	^{16}16	^{14}32		32
Texas	SEC	42	30	13	9	6	4		16	QF	16	16	16	20	16	SF	16	RU	CH	SF	CH	^{x}QF	^{x}SF	^{x}QF	^{7}32	⁝16	^{14}16	^{9}16	✖	^{13}32	^{11}RU	32	32	16	32	^{16}16	32	^{11}16	32	32		16	32	^{6}16	^{9}32	^{2}CH	^{4}CH	^{8}QF	^{9}16	^{14}16	^{9}16
Georgia	SEC	39	36	31	16	6	3						RU	QF	SF	QF	SF	QF	QF	CH	SF	Rf	^{x}16	^{x}SF	^{3}QF	·CH	^{2}SF	^{2}SF	^{8}QF	^{6}QF	^{8}QF	32	^{2}QF	^{2}16	^{2}SF	32	^{8}QF	^{6}QF	^{4}QF	^{1}QF	^{6}SF	^{5}16	^{5}16	^{7}QF	^{1}RU	^{3}QF	^{14}16	^{4}SF	^{7}RU	^{1}CH	^{1}SF
UCLA	Big Ten	44	40	27	15	9	2	RU	SF	QF	16	16	QF	SF	RU	SF	RU	QF	16	16	QF	^{x}SF	^{x}QF	16	^{8}32	:QF	16	^{7}QF	^{11}QF	^{9}RU	^{10}16	16	^{12}RU	^{7}CH	^{11}16	^{7}16	^{6}SF	^{1}RU	^{7}SF	^{5}CH	^{7}RU	32	32	^{12}QF	^{7}QF	^{4}QF	32	16	^{8}QF	16	16
USC	Big Ten	41	31	16	9	4	2	SF	CH	RU	CH	RU	16	SF	QF	QF		16	16	16	16	16	Rf	Rf	^{10}QF	⁝QF	^{10}QF	^{10}16	^{5}QF	^{8}16	^{7}QF	^{3}SF	^{8}16	~~^{10}16~~	^{7}32	32	32	^{5}SF	^{5}16	^{16}16	^{1}SF	32	✖		^{13}16	16	32	32	^{11}16	32	^{13}16
Texas A&M	SEC	31	13	6	4	4	2					16			20							Rf	Rs	Rq		32	✖	✖	32	^{12}16	32	32	32	32	✖	✖	✖	32	^{3}RU	^{10}16	^{10}16	32	16	32	16	^{10}16	^{7}QF	^{2}QF	^{13}CH	^{2}RU	^{4}CH
Vanderbilt	SEC	31	21	8	6	3	1														20	16	Rs	Rf	^{16}16	⁝16	^{6}RU	^{4}16	^{10}QF	^{3}SF	^{4}16	^{12}16	^{16}16	^{11}16	✖	32	16	32	32	^{9}16	^{4}CH	^{6}SF	^{4}SF	^{1}RU	^{8}QF	32	16	32	16	^{15}32	^{14}16
Duke	ACC	37	31	23	11	2	1							16		16	QF	SF	QF	QF	QF	^{x}SF	^{x}SF	^{x}RU	^{5}SF	:16	^{3}QF	^{5}16	^{3}SF	^{7}QF	32	^{8}QF	32	^{9}16	^{3}CH	^{10}QF	^{3}QF	^{3}SF	16	^{4}QF	32	^{9}32	^{15}16	^{3}SF	^{5}SF	QF	^{3}SF	^{6}32	32	^{8}QF	^{15}16
North Carolina	ACC	27	21	14	7	2	1																		32	✖	32	^{6}QF	^{13}16	^{14}32	^{13}QF	^{9}16	^{11}16	^{14}32	32	^{2}SF	^{4}QF	^{7}16	^{2}QF	^{7}RU	^{2}QF	^{3}16	^{2}QF	^{2}16	^{2}SF	^{1}SF	^{1}SF	^{1}CH	^{4}16	^{5}SF	^{5}QF
Georgia Tech	ACC	25	11	3	2	1	1																			32	✖	32	32	32	^{6}16	^{6}16	^{3}CH	^{3}QF	^{9}16	^{14}32	^{14}16	16	32	32	32	16	^{8}16	^{4}SF	32	^{13}16	32	32	32	32	
California	ACC	43	37	22	9	2	-	16	QF	16	SF	QF	QF	QF	QF	QF	QF	QF	QF	SF	QF	Rf	^{x}QF	^{x}16	^{6}SF	:SF	^{9}16	^{15}16	^{4}SF	^{11}32	16	^{10}32	^{10}SF	^{8}RU	^{8}RU	^{12}16	^{9}16	^{9}QF	^{8}QF	^{6}16	^{3}16	^{1}SF	^{13}16		32	^{16}16	^{11}16	✖	^{10}16	16	32
Miami (FL)	ACC	39	25	12	3	2	-	QF	16	QF	RU	SF	16	16	16		16	20				Rq	Rs	Rs	16	✖	✖	32	32	QF	^{9}32	^{7}RU	^{9}QF	^{12}16	^{6}QF	^{11}QF	^{7}QF	^{10}QF	^{6}QF	^{12}16	^{15}16	^{7}16	32	^{16}16	32	32	^{9}16	^{14}32	16		32
Trinity (TX)	D3	7	7	6	5	1	-	SF	RU	SF	SF	SF	QF	16																																					
Pepperdine	West Coast	42	24	11	2	1	-	16	16	16	16			16	QF	QF	QF	16	16	QF	16	Rs	16	16	^{9}16	:32	✖	32	32	32	32	^{13}32	32	32	✖	✖	32	32	✖	32	32	^{8}QF	^{12}QF	^{13}16	^{6}QF	^{5}RU	^{8}QF	^{9}16	^{6}SF	32	^{11}QF
NC State	ACC	16	7	4	2	1	-																	Rq								32	✖	✖			32		✖			✖	32	✖	^{12}16	^{6}SF	^{6}QF	^{3}RU	^{15}16	^{12}16	^{8}QF
Oklahoma State	Big 12	26	18	6	1	1	-	16	16	16	QF	QF	16	16	QF	16	16					16					^{16}32		✖									✖	32	32	^{12}16	^{12}RU	^{9}QF	^{8}32	^{15}16	✖	^{12}16	32	^{1}16	QF	
Auburn	SEC	18	6	1	1	1	-															Rq			✖			32					32	32	✖				32	32	✖	^{11}16	^{11}16	✖		32	^{13}16	16	32	^{9}16	^{2}RU
Oklahoma	SEC	17	3	1	1	1	-															Rs	Rq	Rq					✖	32						✖	32		✖	32	32				32	✖	^{2}RU	^{13}16	32	^{6}32	^{6}16
Baylor	Big 12	27	11	6	2	-	-															Rq	Rq	Rq	✖	32	^{15}16		✖		^{15}16	^{5}QF	^{13}16	^{5}SF	^{4}QF	^{1}QF	^{5}SF	^{12}16	32	^{14}16	^{8}QF	32	^{16}32	32		^{8}32	32	32	✖	✖	32
Notre Dame	ACC	28	10	5	2	-	-												16	16		^{x}QF	Rs	Rf	^{12}32	⁞16	^{13}16	✖	32	32	32	^{2}QF	^{6}QF	32	^{5}SF	^{5}SF	32	32	32	16	✖	✖	32					32	32	32	32
Tennessee	SEC	33	14	4	2	-	-								20	16	20	16			20	Rs	16	16	^{15}16	16	^{5}16	^{13}SF	^{7}16	16	^{16}32	✖	32	32	^{10}32	^{13}QF	^{13}32	32	32	✖			32	✖	32	32	32	^{15}16	^{16}SF	^{10}QF	32
Clemson	ACC	28	16	3	2	-	-	16	QF	16		16							16	20		16		Rq		✖		32	32	^{5}SF	^{12}SF	^{15}32	^{7}16	^{13}16	^{12}16	^{9}16	^{15}16	32	^{13}16	^{13}16	16	✖	32	32						✖	32
Ohio State	Big Ten	22	6	3	2	-	-															Rq			✖	32	✖	✖	✖	32				✖	✖	32				✖	✖	^{4}QF	^{3}SF	✖	✖	^{15}16	^{10}32	^{10}16	^{12}32	^{4}16	^{3}SF
Michigan	Big Ten	27	14	4	1	-	-															Rs	16	Rq				✖	32	32	✖	32	32	32	32	^{4}16	^{10}16	^{15}16	^{10}16	32	^{11}16	^{10}QF	^{10}16	32	^{16}16	16	32	^{5}QF	^{3}QF	^{3}SF	^{12}16
San Diego State	Pac-12	25	8	4	1	-	-	QF	QF	SF	QF	16			16	20	16	16	20			Rq	Rs	Rs	✖	32		✖	✖		✖	✖	✖		✖				✖								✖		✖		✖
Arizona	Big 12	26	11	3	1	-	-	16			16			20	16	16	QF	16	SF	16	16	^{x}QF	^{x}16	Rf	32	32		32	^{16}32	32		32	✖				✖	32		✖									✖	✖	✖
SMU	ACC	11	4	1	1	-	-			16			SF	16								Rq								32					32	32	16											✖	32		32
Arizona State	Big 12	40	18	8	-	-	-				16	QF		QF	16	16	16	QF	QF	16	QF	Rs	^{x}QF	^{x}16	^{11}16	⁝QF	^{8}QF	^{11}16	^{15}16	16	32	✖	32	32	32	32	32	✖	32	✖	32	32	✖	✖	32	32	32	✖	32	32	^{16}32
Northwestern	Big Ten	33	20	5	-	-	-	16	16	16	16	QF	QF									Rf	Rq	Rq	32	⁞16	^{7}16	^{16}16	✖	^{10}16	^{5}16	^{11}QF	^{5}16	^{1}QF	^{1}QF	^{6}16	^{16}16	^{13}16	^{11}16	^{15}32	32	32	32	^{14}16	✖	32	✖		✖		
Virginia	ACC	25	12	4	-	-	-												20	20		Rs	Rq	Rq			✖		32			32	32		32	32	^{11}16	^{14}16	^{14}16	^{3}QF	^{9}16	^{14}QF		32	32	^{14}16	^{5}QF	^{12}16	^{5}QF	^{7}16	^{7}16
South Carolina	SEC	35	9	3	-	-	-	QF	16					20		16					16	Rs	Rf	Rs	^{14}16	32	32	^{12}32	32	32	32	✖	✖	32	QF	32	32	32	✖	32	32	^{13}32	^{14}16	^{10}16	^{4}QF	✖	32	✖	✖	32	32
Wake Forest	ACC	24	8	3	-	-	-													16	16	^{x}16	^{x}16	^{x}QF	32	·QF	16	^{8}QF		✖	32	32	32	✖	✖							✖	✖	32	32	32	32	32	✖	✖	
Kentucky	SEC	27	9	2	-	-	-					16	16	QF	20	20		20		16			Rq	Rs	32	✖	32	^{14}16	^{9}16	^{15}16	^{3}QF	16	32	32	32					32	✖	32	32	✖	32	32					
Ole Miss	SEC	23	9	2	-	-	-										16	16	16			16	16	^{x}QF	^{4}QF	32	32	✖			✖				32	16	✖	^{16}32	✖	32	32	✖	32	^{5}16		✖				✖	
William & Mary	CAA	26	7	2	-	-	-								20	20	20	16			16	16	QF	QF	^{13}32	⁞32		✖	^{14}16	32	32	✖	^{15}16	32			✖		✖		✖	✖	✖	✖			✖	✖	✖		
Washington	Big Ten	20	5	2	-	-	-																Rq	Rq	✖	✖	^{12}QF	32	^{6}16	^{4}QF	32			✖	16	32	32						✖		^{10}16		✖	32	✖	^{16}32	32
LSU	SEC	27	4	2	-	-	-										20				16	Rs	Rf	Rf	32	16	✖	✖	✖	✖	✖		✖	32	32			✖		✖	32	32	32	✖	32	^{12}32		✖	32	^{13}QF	^{10}QF
Texas Tech	Big 12	14	4	2	-	-	-																															✖	^{16}32	✖	^{16}16	^{16}16	^{6}QF	^{11}QF	✖	32	32	✖	32	^{11}32	32
Florida State	ACC	25	3	2	-	-	-													20		Rq	Rq	Rq	✖	32	✖	✖		32	✖		32	^{15}32	32	^{15}16	^{12}32	✖	✖	32			32	QF	^{11}32	^{7}QF	32	32	32		
Indiana	Big Ten	23	10	1	-	-	-		QF				16	16	16	16	16	16	16	16	16	Rq	Rs	Rs		✖	✖	✖		✖	✖	✖	32	32		✖			✖												
Arkansas	SEC	18	3	1	-	-	-															Rs	Rf	16	✖	32	32					✖		QF	^{14}16	32	32	✖			✖	✖	32			✖	✖	✖			
Kansas	Big 12	15	3	1	-	-	-											20	20	QF		Rf	Rs	16	32																	✖	✖	32	^{14}16		✖	32		✖	✖
VCU	Atlantic 10	22	2	1	-	-	-																	Rf		32	✖	QF	^{12}32			^{14}16	✖	✖	✖	✖	✖	✖	✖	✖	✖	✖		✖	✖	✖	✖			✖	✖
Alabama	SEC	18	2	1	-	-	-												20				Rs				32	32	32	✖	✖	✖			✖		32	^{8}32	^{9}16	^{2}QF	^{13}32				✖	✖	✖		✖		
South Alabama	Sun Belt	13	2	1	-	-	-															Rq	Rf	Rs	QF	⁞16	32	32	32	✖	32										✖				✖		✖				
Wisconsin	Big Ten	12	2	1	-	-	-															^{x}QF	16	Rs	32			32		✖	✖														✖			32	32	32	✖
Iowa State	Big 12	3	1	1	-	-	-																																							32	✖	^{11}QF			
Rollins	D2	1	1	1	-	-	-	QF																																											
BYU	Big 12	19	8	-	-	-	-	16					16	16	16	20	16		16		20	^{x}16	Rs	^{x}16			✖	✖		✖	32	✖	32																✖		✖
Fresno State	Pac-12	17	6	-	-	-	-															Rq	Rq	Rq	16	32	^{11}32	32	32	16	✖	16	^{14}16	^{16}16	^{16}16		✖			✖				✖							
Harvard	Ivy League	16	6	-	-	-	-			16	16	16	16	20								Rf	Rf	Rq	✖				16	✖	16	✖				✖													✖	✖	
San Diego	West Coast	16	2	-	-	-	-								16	16	20	20			20	Rq	Rs	Rq	32												32	✖							✖	✖	✖	32	32		
UCF	Big 12	11	2	-	-	-	-																Rq		✖	✖		✖																32	16	^{9}16	32	✖		32	32
Tulane	American	6	2	-	-	-	-																Rq		✖		32		32	^{16}16	^{14}16																				
US International	defunct	2	2	-	-	-	-				16	16																																							
TCU	Big 12	19	1	-	-	-	-															Rq	Rq	Rq		✖	32	32		✖	32	^{16}16	✖	✖	32	✖		✖	32		32	32	32								✖
Tulsa	American	15	1	-	-	-	-																			32				✖			✖	32	✖	32	32	32	✖	✖	✖	32	✖	16						✖	
Rice	American	15	1	-	-	-	-															Rq	Rq	Rq								✖						16	32	32	32	32	✖	✖	✖	✖				✖	32
Princeton	Ivy League	12	1	-	-	-	-		16																	✖									✖	✖				32	✖	✖		✖	32		32	32	32		
South Florida	American	12	1	-	-	-	-			16													Rq	Rq	✖	✖						32	32	✖		32	✖			✖			✖								
Iowa	Big Ten	8	1	-	-	-	-																		16	✖	✖			✖	✖	✖				✖														✖	
Nebraska	Big Ten	6	1	-	-	-	-																								✖	✖				32	✖	32	^{15}16												
Kansas State	Big 12	4	1	-	-	-	-															Rs		Rq					16															32							
Boston University	Patriot	20	-	-	-	-	-																		✖	✖	✖	✖	✖	✖	✖	✖	✖	✖	✖	✖	✖			✖	✖	✖	✖			✖		✖		✖	
UIC	Missouri Valley	18	-	-	-	-	-																		✖	✖	✖	✖	✖	✖	✖	✖	✖	✖	✖	✖	✖	✖	✖						✖	✖				✖	
South Carolina State	MEAC	18	-	-	-	-	-																								✖	✖	✖	✖	✖	✖	✖	✖	✖	✖		✖	✖		✖	✖	✖	✖	✖	✖	
Winthrop	defunct	17	-	-	-	-	-																			✖		✖	✖	✖	✖	✖		✖	✖	✖	✖	✖	✖	✖		✖	✖	32	✖						
Illinois	Big Ten	16	-	-	-	-	-															Rq	Rq		✖	✖	32		32	✖				✖	32	✖		✖						32	✖			✖	✖	32	
Army	Patriot	16	-	-	-	-	-																		✖	✖	✖		✖		✖	✖	✖	✖	✖	✖	✖	✖	✖					✖	✖		✖				
Sacramento State	Big West	16	-	-	-	-	-																					✖	✖	✖	✖	✖	✖	✖	✖	✖	✖	✖	✖	✖									✖	✖	✖
Furman	SoCon	15	-	-	-	-	-																		✖	✖	✖	32		✖	✖	✖	✖	✖									✖	✖	✖	✖	✖			✖	
Denver	West Coast	15	-	-	-	-	-																							✖				32	✖					✖	✖	✖	32	✖	✖	✖	✖	✖	✖	✖	✖
Quinnipiac	Metro	15	-	-	-	-	-																							✖	✖	✖	✖	✖			✖			✖	✖	✖	✖	✖			✖	✖		✖	✖
UNLV	Mountain West	14	-	-	-	-	-																Rq	Rs				✖	✖		✖		✖	✖	✖	32	✖		32			✖			32			✖			
FIU	CUSA	14	-	-	-	-	-																				32	✖			32	32	✖	✖	32		✖							✖		✖	✖	✖	✖	✖	
Long Beach State	Big West	13	-	-	-	-	-																					✖		✖	✖	32	✖	✖	✖		✖	32	✖	32	✖				✖						
Wichita State	American	13	-	-	-	-	-																									✖	32		✖	✖	✖	✖	✖	✖	✖	✖	✖	32							✖
Richmond	Atlantic 10	11	-	-	-	-	-																Rq	Rq				✖		✖	✖	✖	✖		✖	✖	✖	✖													
North Florida	ASUN	11	-	-	-	-	-																													✖		✖	✖		✖	✖	✖	✖	✖	32		✖			✖
Oregon	Big Ten	10	-	-	-	-	-																Rq		32	✖		32		32	32		✖										✖	32			✖				
Mississippi State	SEC	9	-	-	-	-	-																		32	32	32				✖										32	32	✖	32		✖					
Youngstown State	Horizon	9	-	-	-	-	-																																	✖	✖	✖	✖	✖			✖	✖		✖	✖
Boise State	Pac-12	8	-	-	-	-	-															Rq		Rq			✖						✖	✖	32	32														32	
New Mexico	Mountain West	8	-	-	-	-	-															Rq	Rq	Rs	✖	✖				✖		✖									✖										
Purdue	Big Ten	8	-	-	-	-	-															Rq		Rq					✖			32						✖	32	✖	✖										
Oral Roberts	Summit	8	-	-	-	-	-																		✖	✖	✖	✖					✖	✖	✖			✖													
Southern	SWAC	8	-	-	-	-	-																					✖	✖	✖	✖					✖	✖	✖	✖												
LIU	NEC	8	-	-	-	-	-																												✖	✖							✖	✖	✖	✖		✖	✖		
UC Santa Barbara	Big West	8	-	-	-	-	-													20		Rq																				32	✖			✖	32			32	✖
Old Dominion	Sun Belt	8	-	-	-	-	-																				✖																		✖	32	32	32	32	✖	✖
East Tennessee State	SoCon	8	-	-	-	-	-																									✖			✖		✖			✖		✖						✖	✖		✖
Virginia Tech	ACC	7	-	-	-	-	-															Rq	Rq	Rs	✖	✖															32	✖									
Washington State	Pac-12	7	-	-	-	-	-																	Rq	✖		32	✖						✖				32							✖						
Murray State	Missouri Valley	7	-	-	-	-	-																				✖	✖	✖				✖							✖	✖								✖		
Texas A&M–Corpus Christi	Southland	7	-	-	-	-	-																																	✖		✖	✖			✖	✖	✖	✖		
Maryland	Big Ten	7	-	-	-	-	-															Rq		Rq	✖						✖	✖					✖														✖
Utah	Big 12	7	-	-	-	-	-															Rq	Rq	Rq												✖	✖	32													✖
Illinois State	Missouri Valley	7	-	-	-	-	-																				✖		✖	✖	✖														✖		✖				✖
Xavier	Big East	7	-	-	-	-	-																																			✖				✖	✖	✖	✖	✖	✖
Minnesota	Big Ten	6	-	-	-	-	-															Rs	Rq		✖	✖			✖									✖													
Colorado	Big 12	6	-	-	-	-	-															Rq	Rq	Rs	✖				✖				✖																		
Penn	Ivy League	6	-	-	-	-	-															Rq					32	32	✖			32	✖																		
UT Arlington	UAC	6	-	-	-	-	-																		✖	✖	✖			✖					✖		✖														
Charleston	CAA	6	-	-	-	-	-																						✖						✖	✖	✖	✖	✖												
Fairfield	Metro	6	-	-	-	-	-																							✖					✖	✖		✖							✖				✖		
Miami (OH)	MAC	6	-	-	-	-	-																												✖	✖			✖	✖	✖				✖						
Charleston Southern	Big South	6	-	-	-	-	-																																		✖					✖	✖	✖		✖	✖
Alabama State	SWAC	6	-	-	-	-	-																																				✖	✖	✖	✖			✖		✖
UMBC	defunct	5	-	-	-	-	-																		✖	✖	✖	✖	✖																						
Alcorn State	SWAC	5	-	-	-	-	-																			✖	✖							✖							✖	✖									
DePaul	Big East	5	-	-	-	-	-																													✖				✖	32		✖		✖						
Saint Mary's	West Coast	5	-	-	-	-	-																													✖	✖	✖	✖		✖										
Fairleigh Dickinson	NEC	5	-	-	-	-	-																															✖	✖	✖		✖								✖	
Idaho	Big Sky	5	-	-	-	-	-																																	✖	✖	✖	✖	✖							
Yale	Ivy League	5	-	-	-	-	-																											✖			32	32	✖												✖
Houston	Big 12	4	-	-	-	-	-																Rs	Rs																✖	✖										
Bethune–Cookman	SWAC	4	-	-	-	-	-																		✖	✖	✖														✖										
Drake	Missouri Valley	4	-	-	-	-	-																		✖	✖																				✖		✖			
Loyola (MD)	Patriot	4	-	-	-	-	-																		✖	✖	✖	✖																							
Northern Arizona	Big Sky	4	-	-	-	-	-																		✖																				✖	✖	✖				
Western Michigan	MAC	4	-	-	-	-	-																		✖	✖						✖	✖																		
Marshall	Sun Belt	4	-	-	-	-	-																					✖	✖	✖	✖																				
Samford	SoCon	4	-	-	-	-	-																							✖		✖		✖							✖										
Marist	Metro	4	-	-	-	-	-																										✖	✖			✖		✖												
Buffalo	MAC	4	-	-	-	-	-																											✖									✖	✖						✖	
Eastern Kentucky	UAC	4	-	-	-	-	-																												✖			✖	✖					✖							
Georgia State	Sun Belt	4	-	-	-	-	-																												✖					32		✖		✖							
Stony Brook	CAA	4	-	-	-	-	-																															✖	✖	✖	✖										
Syracuse	ACC	4	-	-	-	-	-																																			32		✖	32	✖					
Ball State	MAC	4	-	-	-	-	-																																			✖				✖	✖	✖			
Grand Canyon	Mountain West	4	-	-	-	-	-																																							✖		✖	✖	✖	
Bryant	Ohio Valley	4	-	-	-	-	-																																		✖						✖			✖	✖
Marquette	Big East	3	-	-	-	-	-																Rq	Rq	32																										
UMass	MAC	3	-	-	-	-	-																				✖																✖						✖		
Hampton	CAA	3	-	-	-	-	-																					✖	✖	✖																					
Cal Poly	Big West	3	-	-	-	-	-																						✖								✖												✖		
Florida Atlantic	American	3	-	-	-	-	-																						✖		✖																			32	
Southeastern Louisiana	Southland	3	-	-	-	-	-																								✖	✖	✖																		
UC Irvine	Big West	3	-	-	-	-	-																										✖			✖			32												
Jackson State	SWAC	3	-	-	-	-	-																												✖					✖							✖				
Austin Peay	UAC	3	-	-	-	-	-																													✖									✖	✖					
North Texas	American	3	-	-	-	-	-																													✖		✖	✖												
Northwestern State	Southland	3	-	-	-	-	-																													✖			✖		✖										
Purdue Fort Wayne	defunct	3	-	-	-	-	-																													✖	✖		✖												
Hawaii	Mountain West	3	-	-	-	-	-																															✖						✖				✖			
Memphis	American	3	-	-	-	-	-																																32								✖			✖	
San Jose State	Mountain West	3	-	-	-	-	-																																✖				✖			✖					
New Mexico State	CUSA	3	-	-	-	-	-																																		✖				✖		✖				
SIU Edwardsville	Ohio Valley	3	-	-	-	-	-																																			✖	✖						✖		
Stetson	ASUN	3	-	-	-	-	-																																								✖		✖	✖	
Stephen F. Austin	Southland	3	-	-	-	-	-																															✖												✖	✖
Elon	CAA	3	-	-	-	-	-																																	✖										✖	✖
Boston College	ACC	2	-	-	-	-	-																Rq																						✖						
Pacific	West Coast	2	-	-	-	-	-																		✖	✖																									
Weber State	Big Sky	2	-	-	-	-	-																			✖																						✖			
Coastal Carolina	Sun Belt	2	-	-	-	-	-																				✖						✖																		
American	defunct	2	-	-	-	-	-																					✖		✖																					
Loyola Marymount	West Coast	2	-	-	-	-	-																					✖																			✖				
Missouri State	CUSA	2	-	-	-	-	-																					✖																✖							
IU Indy	Horizon	2	-	-	-	-	-																						✖	✖																					
Louisiana–Monroe	defunct	2	-	-	-	-	-																						✖														✖								
Niagara	Metro	2	-	-	-	-	-																						✖		✖																				
Temple	American	2	-	-	-	-	-																						✖					✖																	
Valparaiso	Missouri Valley	2	-	-	-	-	-																								✖	✖																			
Siena	Metro	2	-	-	-	-	-																									✖														✖					
Jacksonville	ASUN	2	-	-	-	-	-																										✖	✖																	
Akron	defunct	2	-	-	-	-	-																														✖	✖													
Columbia	Ivy League	2	-	-	-	-	-																																	✖		✖									
Dartmouth	Ivy League	2	-	-	-	-	-																																		32		✖								
Kansas City	Summit	2	-	-	-	-	-																																				✖	✖							
James Madison	Sun Belt	2	-	-	-	-	-																																						✖	✖					
Southeast Missouri State	Ohio Valley	2	-	-	-	-	-																																								✖	✖			
Florida A&M	SWAC	2	-	-	-	-	-																																									✖		✖	
Morgan State	MEAC	2	-	-	-	-	-																																					✖							✖
Charlotte	American	2	-	-	-	-	-																																									✖			32
Navy	Patriot	2	-	-	-	-	-																																										✖		✖
Toledo	MAC	2	-	-	-	-	-																																										✖		✖
Cornell	Ivy League	1	-	-	-	-	-															Rs																													
Seton Hall	Big East	1	-	-	-	-	-															Rq																													
Brown	Ivy League	1	-	-	-	-	-																Rs																												
Tennessee Tech	defunct	1	-	-	-	-	-																		✖																										
Middle Tennessee	CUSA	1	-	-	-	-	-																			✖																									
Cal State Northridge	Big West	1	-	-	-	-	-																				✖																								
Campbell	CAA	1	-	-	-	-	-																				✖																								
Eastern Michigan	defunct	1	-	-	-	-	-																				✖																								
Penn State	Big Ten	1	-	-	-	-	-																				✖																								
UTSA	American	1	-	-	-	-	-																					✖																							
Missouri	SEC	1	-	-	-	-	-																						✖																						
Troy	Sun Belt	1	-	-	-	-	-																							✖																					
UT Martin	defunct	1	-	-	-	-	-																								✖																				
Texas Southern	defunct	1	-	-	-	-	-																									✖																			
Alabama A&M	SWAC	1	-	-	-	-	-																										✖																		
Indiana State	defunct	1	-	-	-	-	-																											✖																	
Lamar	Southland	1	-	-	-	-	-																											✖																	
Louisville	ACC	1	-	-	-	-	-																											✖																	
Jacksonville State	CUSA	1	-	-	-	-	-																														✖														
UNC Wilmington	CAA	1	-	-	-	-	-																																	✖											
Albany	defunct	1	-	-	-	-	-																																			✖									
UT Rio Grande Valley	Southland	1	-	-	-	-	-																																			✖									
McNeese	Southland	1	-	-	-	-	-																																					✖							
St. John's	Big East	1	-	-	-	-	-																																					✖							
Central Arkansas	UAC	1	-	-	-	-	-																																						✖						
Georgia Southern	Sun Belt	1	-	-	-	-	-																																							✖					
Fordham	Atlantic 10	1	-	-	-	-	-																																									✖			
Chicago State	NEC	1	-	-	-	-	-																																										✖		
UNC Asheville	Big South	1	-	-	-	-	-																																										✖		
Liberty	CUSA	1	-	-	-	-	-																																												✖
Saint Francis	D3	1	-	-	-	-	-																																												✖
Tarleton State	UAC	1	-	-	-	-	-																																												✖

== See also ==
- AIAW Intercollegiate Women's Tennis Champions
- NCAA Women's Tennis Championships (Division II, Division III)
- NAIA Women's Tennis Championship
- NCAA Men's Tennis Championships (Division I, Division II, Division III)
