= Nebraska Cornhuskers women's tennis =

University of Nebraska–Lincoln women's tennis team

- Founded: 1976; 50 years ago
- University: University of Nebraska–Lincoln
- Athletic director: Troy Dannen
- Head coach: German Dalmagro (4th season)
- Conference: Big Ten
- Location: Lincoln, Nebraska
- Home Court: Sid and Hazel Dillon Tennis Center (Capacity: 1,400)
- Nickname: Cornhuskers
- Colors: Scarlet and cream

NCAA Tournament appearances
- 2005, 2006, 2010, 2011, 2012, 2013

Conference regular season champions
- 1977, 1978, 2013, 2020

The Nebraska Cornhuskers women's tennis team competes as part of NCAA Division I, representing the University of Nebraska–Lincoln in the Big Ten Conference. Nebraska has played its home matches at the Sid and Hazel Dillon Tennis Center since 2015.

The program was established in 1976 and has made the NCAA Division I championship six times, most recently in 2013. Fourteen Cornhuskers have won conference championships and twenty have been named all-conference selections. German Dalmagro was named the program's tenth head coach in 2023 following the retirement of Scott Jacobson.

== Conference affiliations ==
- Big Eight Conference (1976–1996)
- Big 12 Conference (1997–2011)
- Big Ten Conference (2012–present)

== Coaches ==
=== Coaching history ===
No.	Coach	Tenure	Overall	Conference
1	Gail Whitaker	1976	N/A (Note: Year-by-year records unavailable before 1979.)	N/A (Note: Conference record and tournament information unavailable prior to 2000.)
2	Sig Garnett	1977	N/A	N/A
3	Henry Cox	1978	N/A	N/A
4	Skip Salzenstein	1979	7–6 (.538)	N/A
5	Julie Wood	1980–1981	36–24 (.600)	N/A
6	Kathy Hawkins	1982–1987	72–73 (.497)	N/A
7	Kerry McDermott	1988	5–12 (.294)	N/A
8	Gregg Calvin	1989–1991	33–18 (.647)	N/A
9	Scott Jacobson	1992–2023	460–287 (.616)	122–138 (.469)
10	German Dalmagro	2024–present	41–32 (.562)	12–25 (.324)

=== Coaching staff ===
Name	Position	First year	Alma mater
German Dalmagro	Head coach	2024	West Florida
Maddie Kobelt	Assistant coach	2024	Syracuse

== Venues ==
For most of its history, Nebraska's tennis facilities and offices were spread across the city of Lincoln and lacked the amenities of most of NU's conference peers. Playing at indoor and outdoor courts miles apart was challenging when weather forced last-minute venue changes. At the time it joined the Big Ten in 2011, Nebraska was the only school in the conference without an indoor on-campus tennis facility.

Nebraska constructed the Sid and Hazel Dillon Tennis Center, its first standalone tennis complex, in 2015. It was built north of Nebraska Innovation Campus as part of a larger $20.4-million project which also included Barbara Hibner Soccer Stadium. The Dillon Tennis Center has 1,400 permanent seats across six indoor and twelve outdoor courts, each with a DecoTurf hardcourt surface.

== Championships and awards ==
=== Team conference championships ===
- Big Eight: 1977, 1978
- Big Ten: 2013, 2020

=== Individual awards ===
- Today's Top 10 Award: Mary Weatherholt (2014)
- Conference player of the year: Mary Weatherholt (2012, 2013)
- Conference freshman of the year: Annie Yang (1994), Lisa Hart (1995), Kim Hartmann (2006), Mary Weatherholt (2009)
- Conference coach of the year: Scott Jacobson (2005, 2010, 2012)

=== Conference champions ===
- Jana Albers / Imke Reimers – 2008

=== First-team All-Americans ===
Singles

- Mary Weatherholt – 2013

Doubles

- Cari Groce – 1984
- Liz Mooney – 1984
- Patricia Veresova – 2013
- Mary Weatherholt – 2013

== NCAA Division I tournament results ==
Nebraska has appeared in six NCAA Division I tournaments with a record of 4–6.

Year	Seed	Round	Opponent	Result
2005		First round	No. 22 South Carolina	L 4–0
2006		First round	No. 29 Michigan	L 4–3
2010		First round Second round	No. 22 Illinois; No. 5 Northwestern	W 4–2; L 4–0
2011		First round	No. 22 Tulsa	L 4–2
2012		First round Second round	No. 54 North Texas; No. 10 Texas	W 4–0; L 4–2
2013	15	First round Second round Round of 16	Wichita State; No. 57 UNLV (2) No. 2 North Carolina	W 5–0; W 4–1; L 4–1

== Seasons ==
Regular season champion

Year	Coach	Overall	Conference	Standing	Conference tournament	Postseason (Note: The first NCAA Division I championships were held in 1982.)	Final rank (Note: The Intercollegiate Tennis Association has published year-end rankings since 1981.)
Big Eight Conference (1976–1996)
1976	Gail Whitaker	N/A	N/A	4th	N/A		
1977	Sig Garnett	N/A	N/A	1st	N/A		
1978	Henry Cox	N/A	N/A	T–1st	N/A		
1979	Skip Salzenstein	7–6	N/A	6th	N/A		
1980	Julie Wood	18–7	N/A	6th	N/A		
1981	Julie Wood	18–17	N/A	6th	N/A		
1982	Kathy Hawkins	14–11	N/A	4th	N/A		
1983	Kathy Hawkins	16–12	N/A	3rd	N/A		
1984	Kathy Hawkins	12–12	N/A	4th	N/A		
1985	Kathy Hawkins	12–14	N/A	4th	N/A		
1986	Kathy Hawkins	9–8	N/A	4th	N/A		
1987	Kathy Hawkins	9–16	N/A	4th	N/A		
1988	Kerry McDermott	5–12	N/A	5th	N/A		
1989	Gregg Calvin	9–5	N/A	5th	N/A		
1990	Gregg Calvin	17–7	N/A	3rd	N/A		
1991	Gregg Calvin	7–6	N/A	4th	N/A		
1992	Scott Jacobson	6–7	N/A	5th	N/A		
1993	Scott Jacobson	7–12	N/A	6th	N/A		
1994	Scott Jacobson	11–10	N/A	4th	N/A		
1995	Scott Jacobson	8–5	N/A	T–3rd	N/A		
1996	Scott Jacobson	5–15	N/A	6th	N/A		
Big 12 Conference (1997–2011)
1997	Scott Jacobson	16–9	N/A	6th	N/A		60
1998	Scott Jacobson	19–6	N/A	6th	N/A		64
1999	Scott Jacobson	13–9	N/A	10th	N/A		69
2000	Scott Jacobson	19–6	6–5	6th	Quarterfinal		58
2001	Scott Jacobson	19–6	6–5	6th	Quarterfinal		55
2002	Scott Jacobson	13–9	3–8	10th	First round		66
2003	Scott Jacobson	12–11	2–9	10th	First round		76
2004	Scott Jacobson	16–9	5–6	7th	First round		75
2005	Scott Jacobson	18–4	9–2	3rd	First round	NCAA Division I first round	39
2006	Scott Jacobson	17–10	6–5	5th	Semifinal	NCAA Division I first round	43
2007	Scott Jacobson	13–9	4–7	8th	Quarterfinal		
2008	Scott Jacobson	16–7	5–6	7th	First round		74
2009	Scott Jacobson	16–7	7–4	4th	Quarterfinal		56
2010	Scott Jacobson	22–6	9–2	3rd	Quarterfinal	NCAA Division I second round	37
2011	Scott Jacobson	20–8	7–4	T–4th	First round	NCAA Division I first round	43
Big Ten Conference (2012–present)
2012	Scott Jacobson	24–5	9–2	T–3rd	First round	NCAA Division I second round	16
2013	Scott Jacobson	24–6	10–1	T–1st	Quarterfinal	NCAA Division I round of 16	16
2014	Scott Jacobson	8–17	0–11	12th	First round		
2015	Scott Jacobson	12–12	0–11	13th			
2016	Scott Jacobson	17–8	4–7	10th			
2017	Scott Jacobson	19–8	5–6	7th	Quarterfinal		
2018	Scott Jacobson	18–7	7–4	T–4th	First round		45
2019	Scott Jacobson	10–17	2–9	12th			
2020	Scott Jacobson	11–4	1–0	T–1st	Canceled due to the COVID-19 pandemic		51
2021	Scott Jacobson	11–6	11–5	5th	Second round		
2022	Scott Jacobson	15–10	7–4	5th	Second round		75
2023	Scott Jacobson	16–10	4–7	T–9th	Quarterfinal		59
2024	German Dalmagro	14–11	3–8	11th	Quarterfinal		
2025	German Dalmagro	12–12	2–11	T–14th			
2026	German Dalmagro	15–9	7–6	T–8th	First round		
