= 1987 NCAA Division I women's tennis championships =

1987 NCAA Division I Women's Tennis Championships
- Date: June 1987
- Edition: 6th
- Location: Los Angeles, California
- Venue: Los Angeles Tennis Center; University of California, Los Angeles

Champions

Women's singles
- (United States) Patty Fendick (Stanford)

Women's doubles
- (United States) Katrina Adams / (United States) Diane Donnelly (Northwestern)
← 1986 ·	NCAA Division I Women's Tennis Championships	· 1988 →

The 1987 NCAA Division I Women's Tennis Championships were the sixth annual championships to determine the national champions of NCAA Division I women's singles, doubles, and team collegiate tennis in the United States. This year's tournaments were held in Los Angeles, California, hosted by the University of California, Los Angeles.

The women's team championship was won by Stanford, their third, and second consecutive, team national title. The Cardinal defeated Georgia in the final round, 5–1.

Stanford's Patty Fendick repeated as the women's singles national champion, the first to accomplish this feat. It would not happen again until Lisa Raymond won back-to-back titles in 1992 and 1993.

The women's doubles title was won by Katrina Adams and Diane Donnelly from Northwestern.

== Format changes ==
- The women's team tournament eliminated its third-place match, just as the men's team tournament did in 1986.

== Host site ==
The tournaments were hosted by the University of California, Los Angeles at the Los Angeles Tennis Center in Los Angeles, California. The men's and women's tournaments would not be held at the same site until 2006.

== Team tournament ==
First round
Stanford	9
USC	0
UCLA	8
Kentucky	1
Northwestern	5
Indiana	4
Florida	8
Harvard	1
SMU	6
BYU	3
California	7
Oklahoma State	2
Trinity (TX)	5
Texas	4
Georgia	5
Miami (FL)	4

Quarterfinals
Stanford	5
UCLA	1
Northwestern	1
Florida	5
SMU	6
California	3
Trinity (TX)	4
Georgia	5

Semifinals
Stanford	5
Florida	1
SMU	2
Georgia	5

Championship
Stanford	5
Georgia	1

== See also ==
- 1987 NCAA Division I Tennis Championships
- NCAA Division II Tennis Championships (Men, Women)
- NCAA Division III Tennis Championships (Men, Women)
