= 1988 NCAA Division I women's tennis championships =

1988 NCAA Division I Women's Tennis Championships
- Date: June 1988
- Edition: 7th
- Location: Los Angeles, California
- Venue: (United States) Los Angeles Tennis Center; University of California, Los Angeles

Champions

Women's singles
- (United States) Shaun Stafford (Florida)

Women's doubles
- (United States) Allison Cooper / (United States) Stella Sampras (UCLA)
← 1987 ·	NCAA Division I Women's Tennis Championships	· 1989 →

The 1988 NCAA Division I Women's Tennis Championships were the seventh annual championships to determine the national champions of NCAA Division I women's singles, doubles, and team collegiate tennis in the United States.

Stanford defeated Florida, 5–2, to win their third consecutive and fifth overall national title.

== Host sites ==
The tournaments were hosted by the University of California, Los Angeles at the Los Angeles Tennis Center in Los Angeles, California. The men's and women's tournaments would not be held at the same site until 2006.

== Team tournament ==
First round
Pepperdine	5
Texas	2
Trinity (TX)	5
Harvard	1
BYU	5
South Carolina	4
Duke	5
Arizona	4

Second round
Florida	5
Pepperdine	1
Arizona State	5
Miami (FL)	4
UCLA	6
Trinity (TX)	0
California	5
SMU	2
USC	5
BYU	1
Kentucky	6
Oklahoma State	0
Stanford	5
Duke	1
Georgia	5
Indiana	4

Quarterfinals
Florida	6
Arizona State	0
UCLA	5
California	2
USC	5
Kentucky	3
Stanford	5
Georgia	3

Semifinals
Florida	5
UCLA	4
USC	1
Stanford	5

Championship
Florida	2
Stanford	5

== See also ==
- NCAA Division II Tennis Championships (Men, Women)
- NCAA Division III Tennis Championships (Men, Women)
