= Noelle Porter =

American tennis player (born 1970)

- Full name: Noelle Porter-Radnoti
- Country (sports): United States
- Born: December 18, 1970 (age 54)
- Plays: Right-handed

Singles
- Highest ranking: No. 217 (Aug 17, 1987)

Grand Slam singles results
- US Open: Q1 (1987)

Noelle Porter-Radnoti (born December 18, 1970) is an American former professional tennis player.

Raised in Tustin, California, Porter was the world's top ranked junior in her age group as a 12-year old and earned comparisons in the press to Chris Evert. She had a win over Leslie Allen to make the second round at the 1984 Ginny of San Diego and the following year won the USTA national hardcourt championships, while still only 14.

Between 1988 and 1992 she played collegiate tennis for Pepperdine University on a full scholarship. She was a five-time All-American and reached the singles semi-finals of the 1989 NCAA singles championships.

Porter is married to former long time Pepperdine athletics coach Robert Radnoti.
