= 1994 Australian Open – Women's singles qualifying =

Women's singles qualifying
- 1994 Australian Open

Events
Singles	men	women		boys	girls
Doubles	men	women	mixed	boys	girls
WC Singles	men	women	quad
WC Doubles	men	women	quad
Legends	men	women	mixed

Qualification
Singles	men	women
- Australian Open

This article displays the qualifying draw for women's singles at the 1994 Australian Open.

== Seeds ==
1. (Japan) Rika Hiraki (second round)
2. (Russia) Elena Makarova (qualified)
3. (France) Lea Ghirardi (first round)
4. (Brazil) Andrea Vieira (first round)
5. (Japan) Ai Sugiyama (first round)
6. (Japan) Misumi Miyauchi (second round)
7. (Israel) Anna Smashnova (qualified)
8. (United States) Ann Henricksson (first round)
9. (Finland) Nanne Dahlman (qualifying competition, lucky loser)
10. (Japan) Kyōko Nagatsuka (first round)
11. (Austria) Barbara Schett (second round)
12. (Belgium) Nancy Feber (second round)
13. (Russia) Eugenia Maniokova (qualifying competition)
14. (Czech Republic) Andrea Strnadová (second round)
15. (South Africa) Tessa Price (second round)
16. (Germany) Heike Rusch (first round)

== Qualifiers ==
1. (United States) Elly Hakami
2. (Israel) Anna Smashnova
3. (Slovenia) Tina Križan
4. (Japan) Naoko Kijimuta
5. (Poland) Magdalena Feistel
6. (Netherlands) Caroline Vis
7. (Netherlands) Manon Bollegraf
8. (Russia) Elena Makarova

== Lucky losers ==
1. (Finland) Nanne Dahlman

== Qualifying draw ==
Key

- Q = Qualifier
- WC = Wild card
- LL = Lucky loser
- Alt = Alternate
- ITF = ITF entry
- PR = Protected ranking
- SR = Special ranking
- SE = Special exempt
- JE = Junior exempt
- JR = Junior Accelerator Programme entrant
- CO = College Accelerator Programme entrant
- NG = Next Gen Accelerator Program entrant
- w/o = Walkover
- r = Retired
- d = Defaulted

=== First qualifier ===
First round
1	(Japan) Rika Hiraki	6	6
WC	(Australia) Danielle Thomas	1	2
(United States) Elly Hakami	6	6^{5}	6
(United States) Camille Benjamin	2	7^{7}	4
(Japan) Masako Yanagi	0	2
WC	(Australia) Gail Biggs	6	6
(Japan) Maya Kidowaki	6^{4}	4
13	(Russia) Eugenia Maniokova	7^{7}	6

Second round
1	(Japan) Rika Hiraki	6^{5}	6	4
(United States) Elly Hakami	7^{7}	4	6
WC	(Australia) Gail Biggs	6	6^{2}	3
13	(Russia) Eugenia Maniokova	3	7^{7}	6

Qualifying competition
(United States) Elly Hakami	7^{7}	3	6
13	(Russia) Eugenia Maniokova	6^{4}	6	2

=== Second qualifier ===
First round
9	(Finland) Nanne Dahlman	6	7^{10}
(United States) Erika deLone	2	6^{8}
(New Zealand) Claudine Toleafoa	2	2
(Japan) Akiko Kijimuta	6	6
(Australia) Catherine Barclay	7^{7}	3	6
(United States) Anne Mall	6^{4}	6	4
(United States) Stephanie Reece	4	1
7	(Israel) Anna Smashnova	6	6

Second round
9	(Finland) Nanne Dahlman	6	4	6
(Japan) Akiko Kijimuta	1	6	2
(Australia) Catherine Barclay	1	1
7	(Israel) Anna Smashnova	6	6

Qualifying competition
9	(Finland) Nanne Dahlman	2	0
7	(Israel) Anna Smashnova	6	6

=== Third qualifier ===
First round
4	(Brazil) Andrea Vieira	7^{7}	4	2
(Japan) Nana Smith	6^{4}	6	6
(Australia) Tracey Morton-Rodgers	1	1
(Argentina) Mercedes Paz	6	6
(Slovenia) Tina Križan	6	6
WC	(Australia) Robyn Mawdsley	3	3
(Finland) Petra Thorén	6	6
16	(Germany) Heike Rusch	1	4

Second round
(Japan) Nana Smith	1	6	2
(Argentina) Mercedes Paz	6	3	6
(Slovenia) Tina Križan	w/o
(Finland) Petra Thorén

Qualifying competition
(Argentina) Mercedes Paz	6	6^{3}	5
(Slovenia) Tina Križan	4	7^{7}	7

=== Fourth qualifier ===
First round
11	(Austria) Barbara Schett	6	6
WC	(Australia) Siobhan Drake-Brockman	1	0
(Australia) Kirrily Sharpe	4	6^{5}
(Australia) Jo-Anne Faull	6	7^{7}
(New Zealand) Julie Richardson	7	3	6
(Australia) Lisa O'Neill	5	6	3
(Japan) Naoko Kijimuta	7	6
5	(Japan) Ai Sugiyama	5	2

Second round
11	(Austria) Barbara Schett	5	6	3
(Australia) Jo-Anne Faull	7	4	6
(New Zealand) Julie Richardson	1	6	2
(Japan) Naoko Kijimuta	6	1	6

Qualifying competition
(Australia) Jo-Anne Faull	5	1
(Japan) Naoko Kijimuta	7	6

=== Fifth qualifier ===
First round
8	(United States) Ann Henricksson	1	1
(Poland) Magdalena Feistel	6	6
WC	(Australia) Shannon Peters	3	2
(France) Angelique Olivier	6	6
(United Kingdom) Monique Javer	6	6^{1}	6
(Austria) Katharina Büche	2	7^{7}	2
(United States) Katrina Adams	2	1
15	(South Africa) Tessa Price	6	6

Second round
(Poland) Magdalena Feistel	6	6
(France) Angelique Olivier	4	4
(United Kingdom) Monique Javer	6	2	7
15	(South Africa) Tessa Price	1	6	5

Qualifying competition
(Poland) Magdalena Feistel	6	6
(United Kingdom) Monique Javer	3	2

=== Sixth qualifier ===
First round
10	(Japan) Kyōko Nagatsuka	5	6^{5}
(United States) Shannan McCarthy	7	7^{7}
(Netherlands) Caroline Vis	6	6
(Japan) Ayako Hirose	1	0
(Canada) Maureen Drake	2	3
(Sweden) Åsa Carlsson	6	6
(South Korea) Park Sung-hee	7^{7}	3	6
3	(France) Lea Ghirardi	6^{1}	6	2

Second round
(United States) Shannan McCarthy	4	2
(Netherlands) Caroline Vis	6	6
(Sweden) Åsa Carlsson	6	6
(South Korea) Park Sung-hee	4	3

Qualifying competition
(Netherlands) Caroline Vis	6	6
(Sweden) Åsa Carlsson	4	4

=== Seventh qualifier ===
First round
6	(Japan) Misumi Miyauchi	3	6	6
WC	(Australia) Maija Avotins	6	3	1
(Australia) Danielle Jones	6^{3}	0
(Australia) Louise Field	7^{7}	6
(Netherlands) Manon Bollegraf	6	6
(United States) Ann Stephenson	2	3
(Australia) Annabel Ellwood	5	1
12	(Belgium) Nancy Feber	7	6

Second round
6	(Japan) Misumi Miyauchi	6	3	4
(Australia) Louise Field	3	6	6
(Netherlands) Manon Bollegraf	6	6
12	(Belgium) Nancy Feber	3	4

Qualifying competition
(Australia) Louise Field	1	1
(Netherlands) Manon Bollegraf	6	6

=== Eighth qualifier ===
First round
14	(Czech Republic) Andrea Strnadová	2	7	6
(United States) Jessica Emmons	6	5	2
(Italy) Rita Grande	7	2	2
(Venezuela) María Vento	5	6	6
WC	(Australia) Angie Woolcock	1	4
(United States) Julie Steven	6	6
WC	(Australia) Kate McDonald	0	3
2	(Russia) Elena Makarova	6	6

Second round
14	(Czech Republic) Andrea Strnadová	2	3
(Venezuela) María Vento	6	6
(United States) Julie Steven	6	4	3
2	(Russia) Elena Makarova	3	6	6

Qualifying competition
(Venezuela) María Vento	5	1
2	(Russia) Elena Makarova	7	6
