= Kathy Foxworth =

American tennis player

- Country (sports): United States
- Born: November 4, 1964 (age 60)
- Prize money: $33,529

Singles
- Highest ranking: No. 267 (November 23, 1987)

Grand Slam singles results
- Wimbledon: Q1 (1988)
- US Open: Q3 (1987)

Doubles
- Career titles: 11 ITF
- Highest ranking: No. 128 (December 4, 1989)

Grand Slam doubles results
- US Open: 1R (1987, 1989, 1990)

Grand Slam mixed doubles results
- Wimbledon: 1R (1988)

Kathy Foxworth (born November 4, 1964) is an American former professional tennis player.

== Biography ==
Originally from St. Louis, she is the daughter of boxer Bob Foxworth, who once fought an exhibition bout with Joe Louis.

Foxworth played college tennis for the University of Houston, where she was an NCAA All-American for singles in 1987 and twice earned All-American honors for doubles.

During her career on the professional tour she featured in the women's doubles main draw of the US Open on three occasions and played in the mixed doubles at the 1988 Wimbledon Championships. She had best rankings of 267 in singles and 128 in doubles.

Her brother, Bruce Foxworth, was also a professional tennis player.

== ITF finals ==
Legend
$25,000 tournaments
$10,000 tournaments

=== Doubles: 20 (11–9) ===
Result	No.	Date	Tournament	Surface	Partner	Opponents	Score
Loss	1.	June 1, 1987	Brandon, United States	Clay	(United States) Tammy Whittington	(Netherlands) Ingelise Driehuis (South Africa) Lise Gregory	6–7^{(3)}, 7–6^{(8)}, 4–6
Loss	2.	June 8, 1987	Key Biscayne, United States	Hard	(United States) Tammy Whittington	(Netherlands) Ingelise Driehuis (South Africa) Lise Gregory	6–3, 6–7^{(4)}, 2–6
Win	1.	June 28, 1987	Augusta, United States	Hard	(United States) Tammy Whittington	(United States) Jennifer Fuchs (United States) Dena Levy	6–3, 7–5
Loss	3.	July 6, 1987	Seabrook, United States	Clay	(United States) Tammy Whittington	(Netherlands) Ingelise Driehuis (South Africa) Lise Gregory	1–6, 2–6
Winner	2.	July 13, 1987	Fayetteville, United States	Clay	(Netherlands) Ingelise Driehuis	(Australia) Robyn Lamb (United States) Sylvia Schenck	6–2, 2–6, 6–3
Loss	4.	July 20, 1987	Philadelphia, United States	Hard	(United States) Tammy Whittington	(United States) Katrina Adams (Netherlands) Ingelise Driehuis	3–6, 4–6
Win	3.	July 10, 1988	Spartanburg, United States	Clay	(United States) Tammy Whittington	(United States) Vanne Akagi (Australia) Sharon McNamara	3–6, 6–1, 7–6^{(1)}
Win	4.	July 17, 1988	Greensboro, United States	Clay	(United States) Tammy Whittington	(United States) Alissa Finerman (Mexico) Heliane Steden	6–3, 6–3
Loss	5.	September 25, 1988	Chicago, United States	Hard	(United States) Jane Thomas	(Canada) Patricia Hy-Boulais (United States) Mary Lou Daniels	4–6, 2–6
Win	5.	March 5, 1989	Miami, United States	Hard	(United States) Tammy Whittington	(Argentina) Gabriela Mosca (Argentina) Patricia Tarabini	7–6^{(5)}, 7–6^{(6)}
Win	6.	June 11, 1989	Delray Beach, United States	Hard	(United States) Tammy Whittington	(United States) Audra Keller (United States) Kim Barry	6–2, 6–3
Win	7.	August 20, 1989	Chatham, United States	Hard	(United States) Vincenza Procacci	(United States) Jean Ceniza (United States) Stella Sampras	6–3, 6–4
Loss	6.	October 15, 1989	Mobile, United States	Hard	(United States) Vincenza Procacci	(Poland) Renata Baranski (United States) Sandy Collins	3–6, 4–6
Loss	7.	June 10, 1990	Miramar, United States	Hard	(United States) Vincenza Procacci	(United States) Ronni Reis (United States) Lisa Raymond	4–6, 5–7
Win	8.	July 1, 1990	Albany, United States	Clay	(United States) Tammy Whittington	(United States) Shannan McCarthy (United States) Stacey Schefflin	6–2, 2–6, 6–4
Win	9.	August 6, 1990	Lebanon, United States	Hard	(United States) Vincenza Procacci	(Israel) Ilana Berger (Israel) Limor Zaltz	6–4, 4–1 RET.
Win	10.	August 19, 1990	Chatham, United States	Hard	(United States) Shannan McCarthy	(United States) Kirsten Dreyer (Republic of Ireland) Siobhán Nicholson	6–2, 7–6^{(6)}
Loss	8.	July 15, 1991	Evansville, United States	Hard	(United States) Shannan McCarthy	(Japan) Ayako Hirose (Japan) Ei Iida	3–6, 6–2, 4–6
Loss	9.	August 4, 1991	Chatham, United States	Hard	(United States) Susan Gilchrist	(United States) Holly Danforth (United States) Vickie Paynter	7–5, 3–6, 2–6
Win	11.	August 11, 1991	College Park, United States	Hard	(United States) Susan Gilchrist	(United States) Anya Kochoff (South Africa) Karen Van Der Merwe	6–0, 6–2
