= 1987 US Open – Women's singles qualifying =

Women's singles qualifying
- 1987 US Open

Events
Singles	men	women		boys	girls
Doubles	men	women	mixed	boys	girls
WC Singles	men	women	quad
WC Doubles	men	women	quad
Legends	men	women	mixed

Qualification
Singles	men	women
- US Open

Players who neither had high enough rankings nor received wild cards to enter the main draw of the annual US Open Tennis Championships participated in a qualifying tournament held over several days before the event.

== Seeds ==
1. (Sweden) Maria Lindström (first round)
2. (West Germany) Wiltrud Probst (qualified)
3. (Sweden) Carina Karlsson (second round)
4. (Japan) Emiko Okagawa (second round)
5. (United States) Cammy MacGregor (qualified)
6. (France) Catherine Suire (first round)
7. (Poland) Iwona Kuczyńska (qualified)
8. (Czechoslovakia) Andrea Holíková (first round)
9. (France) Marie-Christine Calleja (qualifying competition)
10. (United States) Penny Barg (second round)
11. (New Zealand) Belinda Cordwell (qualifying competition)
12. (United States) Anna-Maria Fernandez (first round)
13. (Italy) Caterina Nozzoli (qualifying competition)
14. (Australia) Jenny Byrne (qualifying competition)
15. (France) Emmanuelle Derly (qualified)
16. (Australia) Susan Leo (first round)

== Qualifiers ==
1. (France) Julie Halard-Decugis
2. (Brazil) Patricia Medrado
3. (Netherlands) Brenda Schultz-McCarthy
4. (Czechoslovakia) Radka Zrubáková
5. (Poland) Iwona Kuczyńska
6. (France) Emmanuelle Derly
7. (United States) Cammy MacGregor
8. (West Germany) Wiltrud Probst

== Qualifying draw ==
Key

- Q = Qualifier
- WC = Wild card
- LL = Lucky loser
- Alt = Alternate
- ITF = ITF entry
- PR = Protected ranking
- SR = Special ranking
- SE = Special exempt
- JE = Junior exempt
- JR = Junior Accelerator Programme entrant
- CO = College Accelerator Programme entrant
- NG = Next Gen Accelerator Program entrant
- w/o = Walkover
- r = Retired
- d = Defaulted

=== First qualifier ===
First round
1	(Sweden) Maria Lindström	5	4
(France) Julie Halard-Decugis	7	6
(United States) Melissa Brown	6	7
(United States) Jane Forman	3	5
(United States) Jenny Klitch	3	2
(Czechoslovakia) Regina Rajchrtová	6	6
(Japan) Masako Yanagi	4	3
14	(Australia) Jenny Byrne	6	6

Second round
(France) Julie Halard-Decugis	6	6
(United States) Melissa Brown	2	3
(Czechoslovakia) Regina Rajchrtová	4	3
14	(Australia) Jenny Byrne	6	6

Qualifying competition
(France) Julie Halard-Decugis	6	7
14	(Australia) Jenny Byrne	4	5

=== Second qualifier ===
First round
9	(France) Marie-Christine Calleja	6	6
(Spain) María José Llorca	2	0
(New Zealand) Julie Richardson	6	2	4
(United States) Anne Grousbeck	4	6	6
(Brazil) Patricia Medrado	6	6
(United States) Susan Mascarin	3	1
(United States) Katrina Adams	6	1	6
6	(France) Catherine Suire	3	6	4

Second round
9	(France) Marie-Christine Calleja	6	6
(United States) Anne Grousbeck	1	0
(Brazil) Patricia Medrado	6	6
(United States) Katrina Adams	1	0

Qualifying competition
9	(France) Marie-Christine Calleja	4	1
(Brazil) Patricia Medrado	6	6

=== Third qualifier ===
First round
3	(Sweden) Carina Karlsson	7^{7}	6
(United States) Cecilia Fernandez-Parker	6^{4}	2
(United States) Noelle Porter	4	7	6^{6}
(United States) Kathy Foxworth	6	5	7^{8}
(France) Sybille Niox-Château	6	2	2
(Netherlands) Brenda Schultz-McCarthy	2	6	6
(United States) Amy Schwartz	6	6
16	(Australia) Susan Leo	3	1

Second round
3	(Sweden) Carina Karlsson	6	4	4
(United States) Kathy Foxworth	3	6	6
(Netherlands) Brenda Schultz-McCarthy	3	7	6
(United States) Amy Schwartz	6	5	3

Qualifying competition
(United States) Kathy Foxworth	3	4
(Netherlands) Brenda Schultz-McCarthy	6	6

=== Fourth qualifier ===
First round
11	(New Zealand) Belinda Cordwell	6	7^{7}
(United States) Emilse Longo	3	6^{0}
(Norway) Amy Jönsson Raaholt	2	2
(France) Alexia Dechaume-Balleret	6	6
(United States) Ginny Purdy	3	2
(Czechoslovakia) Radka Zrubáková	6	6
(Brazil) Cláudia Monteiro	1	7	6
8	(Czechoslovakia) Andrea Holíková	6	5	3

Second round
11	(New Zealand) Belinda Cordwell	6	6
(France) Alexia Dechaume-Balleret	3	2
(Czechoslovakia) Radka Zrubáková	6	6
(Brazil) Cláudia Monteiro	1	2

Qualifying competition
11	(New Zealand) Belinda Cordwell	2	2
(Czechoslovakia) Radka Zrubáková	6	6

=== Fifth qualifier ===
First round
7	(Poland) Iwona Kuczyńska	3	6	6
(Japan) Yukie Koizumi	6	0	4
(Czechoslovakia) Kateřina Böhmová	6	6
(West Germany) Gabriela Dinu	3	3
(United States) Jamie Golder	0	1
(United States) Sandy Collins	6	6
(United States) Iwalani McCalla	2	4
13	(Italy) Caterina Nozzoli	6	6

Second round
7	(Poland) Iwona Kuczyńska	6	6
(Czechoslovakia) Kateřina Böhmová	3	2
(United States) Sandy Collins	4	3
13	(Italy) Caterina Nozzoli	6	6

Qualifying competition
7	(Poland) Iwona Kuczyńska	6	6
13	(Italy) Caterina Nozzoli	2	1

=== Sixth qualifier ===
First round
15	(France) Emmanuelle Derly	6	6
(United States) Susan Rimes	3	1
(Netherlands) Marcella Mesker	6	6
(United States) Sonia Hahn	1	1
(United States) Kim Sands	1	2
(Italy) Silvia La Fratta	6	6
(Peru) Pilar Vásquez	4	4
4	(Japan) Emiko Okagawa	6	6

Second round
15	(France) Emmanuelle Derly	3	6	6
(Netherlands) Marcella Mesker	6	4	2
(Italy) Silvia La Fratta	7	6
4	(Japan) Emiko Okagawa	5	0

Qualifying competition
15	(France) Emmanuelle Derly	2	7	6
(Italy) Silvia La Fratta	6	5	2

=== Seventh qualifier ===
First round
5	(United States) Cammy MacGregor	6	6
(United States) Kris Kinney	1	0
(Sweden) Helena Dahlström	0	3
(United Kingdom) Valda Lake	6	6
(United States) Louise Allen	7	6
(South Africa) Lise Gregory	5	4
(United States) Elizabeth Alexander	4	2
10	(United States) Penny Barg	6	6

Second round
5	(United States) Cammy MacGregor	7	6
(United Kingdom) Valda Lake	5	4
(United States) Louise Allen	6	6
10	(United States) Penny Barg	4	1

Qualifying competition
5	(United States) Cammy MacGregor	6	6
(United States) Louise Allen	2	3

=== Eighth qualifier ===
First round
12	(United States) Anna-Maria Fernandez	3	2
(Italy) Linda Ferrando	6	6
(Netherlands) Marianne van der Torre	6	6
(United States) Deeann Hansel	2	3
(United States) Lea Antonoplis	6	6
(United States) Debbie Graham	4	4
(United States) Candy Reynolds	2	3
2	(West Germany) Wiltrud Probst	6	6

Second round
(Italy) Linda Ferrando	2	3
(Netherlands) Marianne van der Torre	6	6
(United States) Lea Antonoplis	7^{7}	3	3
2	(West Germany) Wiltrud Probst	6^{1}	6	6

Qualifying competition
(Netherlands) Marianne van der Torre	3	6	5
2	(West Germany) Wiltrud Probst	6	4	7
