= Sonia Hahn =

American tennis player

- Full name: Sonia Hahn Patrick
- Country (sports): United States
- Born: August 25, 1967 (age 59)
- Prize money: $10,032

Singles
- Highest ranking: No. 283 (July 18, 1988)

Grand Slam singles results
- US Open: Q1 (1987)

Doubles
- Highest ranking: No. 275 (December 21, 1986)

Grand Slam doubles results
- US Open: 1R (1987)
Medal record
Pan American Games
| Gold medal – first place | 1987 Indianapolis | Women's doubles |
Summer Universiade
| Bronze medal – third place | 1987 Zagreb | Women's doubles |

Sonia Hahn (born August 25, 1967) is an American former professional tennis player. She is of Korean descent.

== Biography ==
Hahn is originally from Carrollton, Georgia and played college tennis at the University of Kentucky. During her collegiate career she was a four-time All-American in singles and twice a doubles All-American. She won the university's Female Athlete of the Year award in 1987, then was SEC Player of the Year in 1988.

While in college Hahn represented the United States internationally, winning a gold medal at the 1987 Pan American Games, with Ronni Reis in the doubles event. She and Reis went on to feature together in the women's doubles at the 1987 US Open, which was her only grand slam main draw appearance. In 1987 she also won a doubles bronze, with Katrina Adams, at the 1987 Summer Universiade in Zagreb.

Since retiring she has been a long serving coach in college tennis. This includes 19-years as the co-head coach of the Tennessee Volunteers women's tennis team, along with then husband Mike Patrick.

== ITF finals ==
=== Doubles: 6 (3–3) ===
| Result | No. | Date | Tournament | Surface | Partner | Opponents | Score |
|---|---|---|---|---|---|---|---|
| Win | 1. | June 10, 1985 | Birmingham, United Kingdom | Clay | (United States) Ann Etheredge | (United States) Jenni Goodling (Sweden) Maria Lindström | 6–2, 6–4 |
| Win | 2. | June 23, 1985 | Fayetteville, United States | Hard | (United States) Linda Gates | (United States) Caroline Kuhlman (United States) Wendy Wood | 6–4, 6–3 |
| Loss | 1. | August 11, 1985 | Freehold, United States | Hard | (United States) Jennifer Prah | (United States) Louise Allen (United States) Ronni Reis | 4–6, 2–6 |
| Loss | 2. | June 22, 1986 | Birmingham, United States | Clay | (United States) Ann Etheredge | (South Africa) Lise Gregory (Mexico) Heliane Steden | 4–6, 6–2, 4–6 |
| Win | 3. | July 14, 1986 | Midland, United States | Clay | (United States) Katrina Adams | (Australia) Alison Scott (New Zealand) Ruth Seeman | 2–6, 6–3, 6–4 |
| Loss | 3. | June 15, 1987 | Birmingham, United States | Hard | (United States) Katrina Adams | (Netherlands) Ingelise Driehuis (South Africa) Lise Gregory | 7–6^{(0)}, 4–6, 2–6 |
