= Mamie Ceniza =

American tennis player

- Full name: Jean Ceniza Wraith
- Country (sports): United States
- Born: May 10, 1970 (age 55)
- Prize money: $12,127

Singles
- Career record: 26–24
- Career titles: 0
- Highest ranking: No. 307 (September 19, 1994)

Doubles
- Career record: 27–22
- Career titles: 2 ITF
- Highest ranking: No. 218 (January 31, 1994)

Grand Slam doubles results
- US Open: 1R (1992)

Jean "Mamie" Ceniza Wraith (born May 10, 1970) is an American former professional tennis player.

Ceniza, who is of Filipino descent, grew up in the town of Hawkinsville in Georgia. She played college tennis for the UCLA Bruins and partnered with Iwalani McCalla to win the NCAA doubles championship in her senior year in 1992. The pair received wildcards to the main draw of the 1992 US Open.

As a professional player, she reached a career best singles ranking of 307 in the world, with her best WTA Tour performance a second round appearance at Curitaba in 1993. She won two doubles titles on the satellite tour.

== ITF Circuit finals ==
Legend
$25,000 tournaments
$10,000 tournaments

=== Doubles: 6 (2 titles, 4 runner-ups) ===
Outcome	No.	Date	Tournament	Surface	Partner	Opponents	Score
Runner-up	1.	August 20, 1989	ITF Chatham, United States	Hard	(United States) Stella Sampras	(United States) Vincenza Procacci (United States) Kathy Foxworth	3–6, 4–6
Winner	1.	July 5, 1992	ITF Columbia, United States	Hard	(United States) Shawn McCarthy	(United States) Jill Craybas (United States) Kelly Pace	6–2, 6–4
Runner-up	2.	February 1, 1993	ITF Midland, United States	Hard	(Canada) Caroline Delisle	(United States) Meredith McGrath (United States) Patty Fendick	6–7^{(5)}, 2–6
Runner-up	3.	October 3, 1993	ITF Midland, United States	Hard	(United States) Camille Benjamin	(United States) Heather Ludloff (United States) Tammy Whittington	6–4, 3–6, 3–6
Winner	2.	January 17, 1994	ITF McAllen, United States	Hard	(South Africa) Mareze Joubert	(United States) Tonya Evans (United States) Eleni Rossides	7–6^{(2)}, 6–2
Runner-up	4.	January 24, 1994	ITF Austin, United States	Hard	(South Africa) Mareze Joubert	(France) Sophie Amiach (Australia) Tracey Morton-Rodgers	6–7, 6–7
