= 1992 US Open – Women's doubles =

Women's doubles
- 1992 US Open

Final
- Champions: (United States) Gigi Fernández (Commonwealth of Independent States) Natasha Zvereva
- Runners-up: (Czechoslovakia) Jana Novotná (Latvia) Larisa Savchenko-Neiland
- Score: 7–6^{(7–4)}, 6–1

Details
- Draw: 64 (4 WC )
- Seeds: 16

Events
Singles	men	women		boys	girls
Doubles	men	women	mixed	boys	girls
WC Singles	men	women	quad
WC Doubles	men	women	quad
Legends	men	women	mixed
← 1991 ·	US Open	· 1993 →

Pam Shriver and Natasha Zvereva were the defending champions for the women's doubles. In 1992, they competed with different partners, Shriver with Martina Navratilova and Zvereva with Gigi Fernández.

Navratilova and Shriver lost in the semifinals to Jana Novotná and Larisa Savchenko-Neiland.

Fernández and Zvereva won in the final 7–6^{(7–4)}, 6–1 against Novotná and Savchenko-Neiland.

== Seeds ==
Champion seeds are indicated in bold text while text in italics indicates the round in which those seeds were eliminated.

1. (Czechoslovakia) Jana Novotná / (Latvia) Larisa Savchenko-Neiland (final)
2. (Spain) Arantxa Sánchez Vicario / (Czechoslovakia) Helena Suková (semifinals)
3. (United States) **Gigi Fernández** / (Commonwealth of Independent States) **Natasha Zvereva (champions)**
4. (United States) Martina Navratilova / (United States) Pam Shriver (semifinals)
5. (United States) Mary Joe Fernández / (United States) Zina Garrison (quarterfinals)
6. (United States) Lori McNeil / (Australia) Rennae Stubbs (quarterfinals)
7. (United States) Sandy Collins / (United States) Stephanie Rehe (third round)
8. (United States) Patty Fendick / (Czechoslovakia) Andrea Strnadová (quarterfinals)
9. (Spain) Conchita Martínez / (Argentina) Mercedes Paz (third round)
10. (Canada) Jill Hetherington / (United States) Kathy Rinaldi (third round)
11. (Commonwealth of Independent States) Leila Meskhi / (South Africa) Elna Reinach (third round)
12. (Australia) Rachel McQuillan / (Germany) Claudia Porwik (quarterfinals)
13. (France) Isabelle Demongeot / (France) Nathalie Tauziat (third round)
14. (Bulgaria) Katerina Maleeva / (Germany) Barbara Rittner (first round)
15. (France) Alexia Dechaume / (Argentina) Florencia Labat (first round)
16. (Australia) Elizabeth Smylie / (United States) Robin White (second round)

== Draw ==
=== Key ===
- Q = Qualifier
- WC = Wild card
- LL = Lucky loser
- Alt = Alternate
- SE = Special exempt
- PR = Protected ranking
- ITF = ITF entry
- JE = Junior exempt
- w/o = Walkover
- r = Retired
- d = Defaulted
- SR = Special ranking

=== Finals ===
Semifinals
1	(Czechoslovakia) Jana Novotná (Latvia) Larisa Savchenko-Neiland	6	7
4	(United States) Martina Navratilova (United States) Pam Shriver	4	5
3	(United States) Gigi Fernández (Commonwealth of Independent States) Natasha Zvereva	6	6
2	(Spain) Arantxa Sánchez Vicario (Czechoslovakia) Helena Suková	1	3

Final
1	(Czechoslovakia) Jana Novotná (Latvia) Larisa Savchenko-Neiland	6^{4}	1
3	(United States) Gigi Fernández (Commonwealth of Independent States) Natasha Zvereva	7^{7}	6

=== Top half ===
==== Section 1 ====
First round
1	(Czechoslovakia) J Novotná (Latvia) L Savchenko-Neiland	6	6
(Australia) L Field (South Africa) L Gregory	1	3
(Netherlands) M Oremans (Netherlands) C Vis	6	3	6
(United States) C Benjamin (United States) J Santrock	1	6	4
WC	(United States) L Davenport (United States) C Rubin	1	5
(United States) C MacGregor (United States) K Po	6	7
(United States) S Stafford (United States) M Werdel	5	2
9	(Spain) C Martínez (Argentina) M Paz	7	6
15	(France) A Dechaume (Argentina) F Labat	6^{5}	1
(United States) A Frazier (Japan) R Hiraki	7^{7}	6
(United States) A Grossman (Sweden) C Lindqvist	6	3	2
(United States) E Burgin (South Africa) M de Swardt	3	6	6
(Australia) K-A Guse (Japan) N Miyagi	4	4
(Australia) J-A Faull (New Zealand) J Richardson	6	6
WC	(United States) K Schlukebir (United States) J Steven	2	0
5	(United States) M J Fernández (United States) Z Garrison	6	6

Second round
1	(Czechoslovakia) J Novotná (Latvia) L Savchenko-Neiland	6	6
(Netherlands) M Oremans (Netherlands) C Vis	1	2
(United States) C MacGregor (United States) K Po	7^{8}	3	3
9	(Spain) C Martínez (Argentina) M Paz	6^{6}	6	6
(United States) A Frazier (Japan) R Hiraki	1	2
(United States) E Burgin (South Africa) M de Swardt	6	6
(Australia) J-A Faull (New Zealand) J Richardson	4	4
5	(United States) M J Fernández (United States) Z Garrison	6	6

Third round
1	(Czechoslovakia) J Novotná (Latvia) L Savchenko-Neiland	6	6
9	(Spain) C Martínez (Argentina) M Paz	2	3
(United States) E Burgin (South Africa) M de Swardt	2	6	6^{7}
5	(United States) M J Fernández (United States) Z Garrison	6	4	6^{9}

Quarterfinals
1	(Czechoslovakia) J Novotná (Latvia) L Savchenko-Neiland	1	6	7^{7}
5	(United States) M J Fernández (United States) Z Garrison	6	4	6^{1}

==== Section 2 ====
First round
4	(United States) M Navratilova (United States) P Shriver	7	6
(Czechoslovakia) P Langrová (Czechoslovakia) R Zrubáková	5	2
(United States) L Glitz (South Africa) T Price	1	3
(Indonesia) Y Basuki (United Kingdom) J Durie	6	6
(Italy) S Farina (Italy) L Ferrando	6	6
(Japan) A Kijimuta (Japan) N Sawamatsu	1	2
(France) J Halard (Germany) A Huber	4	3
13	(France) I Demongeot (France) N Tauziat	6	6
11	(Commonwealth of Independent States) L Meskhi (South Africa) E Reinach	6	6
(United States) P Harper (United States) L Harvey-Wild	3	2
(Japan) K Date (Australia) L Pleming	4	4
(United States) J Emmons (Canada) R Simpson-Alter	6	6
(Australia) T Morton (United Kingdom) C Wood	6	7^{7}
(United States) C Kuhlman (Mexico) L Novelo	3	6^{5}
WC	(United States) B Nagelsen (France) M Pierce	4	6^{4}
8	(United States) P Fendick (Czechoslovakia) A Strnadová	6	7^{7}

Second round
4	(United States) M Navratilova (United States) P Shriver	6	7
(Indonesia) Y Basuki (United Kingdom) J Durie	2	5
(Italy) S Farina (Italy) L Ferrando	3	3
13	(France) I Demongeot (France) N Tauziat	6	6
11	(Commonwealth of Independent States) L Meskhi (South Africa) E Reinach	3	6	6
(United States) J Emmons (Canada) R Simpson-Alter	6	1	0
(Australia) T Morton (United Kingdom) C Wood	2	1
8	(United States) P Fendick (Czechoslovakia) A Strnadová	6	6

Third round
4	(United States) M Navratilova (United States) P Shriver	6	6
13	(France) I Demongeot (France) N Tauziat	4	0
11	(Commonwealth of Independent States) L Meskhi (South Africa) E Reinach	3	4
8	(United States) P Fendick (Czechoslovakia) A Strnadová	6	6

Quarterfinals
4	(United States) M Navratilova (United States) P Shriver	6	6
8	(United States) P Fendick (Czechoslovakia) A Strnadová	2	2

=== Bottom half ===
==== Section 3 ====
First round
6	(United States) L McNeil (Australia) R Stubbs	7^{7}	6
(Australia) J Byrne (Australia) N Provis	6^{1}	3
(Netherlands) I Driehuis (France) N van Lottum	6	2	3
(France) P Paradis-Mangon (France) S Testud	4	6	6
(Czechoslovakia) I Jankovská (Czechoslovakia) E Melicharová	2	2
(Commonwealth of Independent States) E Brioukhovets (Commonwealth of Independent States) N Medvedeva	6	6
(Italy) S Cecchini (Argentina) P Tarabini	5	3
10	(Canada) J Hetherington (United States) K Rinaldi	7	6
14	(Bulgaria) K Maleeva (Germany) B Rittner	5	1
(Argentina) B Fulco-Villella (Spain) V Ruano Pascual	7	6
(United States) J Fuchs (Sweden) M Strandlund	2	4
(Peru) L Gildemeister (Czechoslovakia) K Habšudová	6	6
(United States) C Cunningham (United States) M L Daniels	6^{2}	6	6
(Germany) K Kschwendt (Austria) P Ritter	7^{7}	3	3
(South Africa) A Coetzer (Bulgaria) M Maleeva	4	2
3	(United States) G Fernández (Commonwealth of Independent States) N Zvereva	6	6

Second round
6	(United States) L McNeil (Australia) R Stubbs	6	7^{7}
(France) P Paradis-Mangon (France) S Testud	3	6^{1}
(Commonwealth of Independent States) E Brioukhovets (Commonwealth of Independent States) N Medvedeva	3	6	3
10	(Canada) J Hetherington (United States) K Rinaldi	6	4	6
(Argentina) B Fulco-Villella (Spain) V Ruano Pascual	4	3
(Peru) L Gildemeister (Czechoslovakia) K Habšudová	6	6
(United States) C Cunningham (United States) M L Daniels	1	1
3	(United States) G Fernández (Commonwealth of Independent States) N Zvereva	6	6

Third round
6	(United States) L McNeil (Australia) R Stubbs	6	7
10	(Canada) J Hetherington (United States) K Rinaldi	4	5
(Peru) L Gildemeister (Czechoslovakia) K Habšudová	2	2
3	(United States) G Fernández (Commonwealth of Independent States) N Zvereva	6	6

Quarterfinals
6	(United States) L McNeil (Australia) R Stubbs	3	2
3	(United States) G Fernández (Commonwealth of Independent States) N Zvereva	6	6

==== Section 4 ====
First round
7	(United States) S Collins (United States) S Rehe	6	6
(United States) D Graham (Netherlands) B Schultz	1	1
(United States) L Allen (United States) A Henricksson	7	6
(United States) H Ludloff (France) C Suire	5	4
(Belgium) S Appelmans (Austria) J Wiesner	6	6
(Spain) A Segura (Spain) J Souto	2	0
(Finland) N Dahlman (Italy) L Golarsa	4	2
12	(Australia) R McQuillan (Germany) C Porwik	6	6
16	(Australia) E Smylie (United States) R White	6	3	6
(United States) G Helgeson (United States) S McCarthy	3	6	3
(United States) R Fairbank-Nideffer (United States) G Magers	3	6	6
WC	(United States) J Ceniza (Jamaica) I McCalla	6	2	2
(United States) S Sampras (United States) T Whitlinger	6	6
(France) A Fusai (Australia) K Godridge	2	2
(Australia) M Jaggard-Lai (Netherlands) N Muns-Jagerman	3	2
2	(Spain) A Sánchez Vicario (Czechoslovakia) H Suková	6	6

Second round
7	(United States) S Collins (United States) S Rehe	6	7^{7}
(United States) L Allen (United States) A Henricksson	2	6^{5}
(Belgium) S Appelmans (Austria) J Wiesner	4	6^{2}
12	(Australia) R McQuillan (Germany) C Porwik	6	7^{7}
16	(Australia) E Smylie (United States) R White	4	6	6^{3}
(United States) R Fairbank-Nideffer (United States) G Magers	6	4	7^{7}
(United States) S Sampras (United States) T Whitlinger	2	2
2	(Spain) A Sánchez Vicario (Czechoslovakia) H Suková	6	6

Third round
7	(United States) S Collins (United States) S Rehe	3	2
12	(Australia) R McQuillan (Germany) C Porwik	6	6
(United States) R Fairbank-Nideffer (United States) G Magers	6^{5}	2
2	(Spain) A Sánchez Vicario (Czechoslovakia) H Suková	7^{7}	6

Quarterfinals
12	(Australia) R McQuillan (Germany) C Porwik	4	6	4
2	(Spain) A Sánchez Vicario (Czechoslovakia) H Suková	6	1	6
