= Heliane Steden =

Mexican tennis player

- Full name: Heliane Marie Steden
- Country (sports): Mexico
- Born: 18 July 1964 (age 61) West Germany
- Prize money: $33,804

Singles
- Career record: 39–37
- Highest ranking: No. 159 (21 December 1986)

Doubles
- Career record: 27–17
- Highest ranking: No. 129 (20 July 1987)

Grand Slam doubles results
- French Open: 1R (1987)
Medal record
Pan American Games
Bronze medal – third place	1983 Caracas	Women's Singles

Heliane Marie Steden (born 18 July 1964) is a former professional tennis player from Mexico.

== Biography ==
Born in West Germany, Steden later emigrated to Mexico City, where she was raised.

As a junior she competed at Wimbledon and was a girls' singles quarter-finalist at the 1981 US Open.

=== Tennis career ===
She debuted for the Mexico Fed Cup team in 1981, as a 17-year-old. In 1982 she secured a win for Mexico over Belgium when she had a straight sets win over Marion De Witte. This set up a second round tie against the United States and she came up against Martina Navratilova in the singles, which she lost in two sets. She also played a Fed Cup rubber against top Australian player Wendy Turnbull, in 1983, which she came close to winning having held four match points.

At the 1983 Pan American Games in Caracas she won a bronze medal in the women's singles, with a win over Brazil's Silvana Campos in the playoff.

From 1983 to 1986 she attended the University of Southern California on a tennis scholarship and was a member of two NCAA Championship winning teams. During this period she continued to represent Mexico in the Fed Cup and by the time she made her last appearance in 1985 had featured in a total of 12 ties. She made her first main draw on the WTA Tour at Rio de Janeiro in 1984 while she was in Brazil for the Fed Cup.

Once she graduated, with a degree in business administration, she spent a year on the international circuit. With regular doubles partner Cecilia Fernandez, a teammate from USC, she made WTA Tour doubles quarter-finals at Berkeley in 1986 and Hilton Head in 1987. She competed in the main draw of the women's doubles at the 1987 French Open with Nicole Muns-Jagerman, where they were beaten in the first round by fourth seeds Elise Burgin and Rosalyn Fairbank.

=== Personal life ===
Steden continues to live in the United States and works in the finance industry. She was a financial advisor with Merrill Lynch in New York from 1999 to 2017. Her husband, Andy Sieg, is a banking executive serving as Head of Global Wealth with Citi.

== ITF finals ==
=== Doubles (3–2) ===
Result	No.	Date	Tournament	Surface	Partner	Opponents	Score
Win	1.	8 June 1985	Boynton Beach, United States	Hard	(United States) Cecilia Fernandez-Parker	(United States) Beverly Bowes (United States) Becky Callan	6–3, 7–5
Loss	1.	4 August 1985	Chatham, United States	Clay	(South Africa) Elvyn Barrable	(United States) Caroline Kuhlman (United States) Lynn Lewis	1–6, 2–6
Winner	2.	16 June 1986	Birmingham, United States	Clay	(South Africa) Lise Gregory	(United States) Ann Etheredge (United States) Sonia Hahn	6–4, 2–6, 6–4
Winner	3.	30 June 1986	Tampa, United States	Clay	(United States) Katrina Adams	(United States) Brenda Niemeyer (United States) Karen Schimper	4–6, 6–1, 6–3
Loss	2.	17 July 1988	Greensboro, United States	Clay	(United States) Alissa Finerman	(United States) Kathy Foxworth (United States) Tammy Whittington	3–6, 3–6
