= Vincenza Procacci =

American tennis player

- Country (sports): United States
- Born: August 20, 1966 (age 58)
- Prize money: $11,631

Singles
- Career record: 24–57
- Highest ranking: No. 446 (March 28, 1988)

Doubles
- Career record: 58–43
- Career titles: 5 ITF
- Highest ranking: No. 213 (July 3, 1989)

Vincenza Procacci (born August 20, 1966) is an American former professional tennis player.

Raised in Lake George, New York, Procacci won five ITF doubles titles on the professional tour and featured in the doubles main draw of the 1989 Lipton International Players Championships, a WTA Tour tournament in Key Biscayne.

Procacci had a career high singles ranking of 446, along with a best doubles ranking of 213 in the world.

== ITF finals ==
Legend
$25,000 tournaments
$10,000 tournaments

=== Doubles: 11 (5–6) ===
Result	No.	Date	Tournament	Surface	Partner	Opponents	Score
Loss	1.	January 4, 1988	Johannesburg, South Africa	Hard	(United States) Anne Grousbeck	(South Africa) Linda Barnard (South Africa) Mariaan de Swardt	5–7, 2–6
Win	1.	March 13, 1988	Valencia, Spain	Clay	(France) Nathalie Ballet	(Spain) Penelope Fas (Spain) Sonsoles Hurtado	4–6, 6–3, 6–2
Win	2.	August 7, 1988	Roanoke, United States	Hard	(Australia) Robyn Lamb	(Australia) Danielle Jones (Australia) Lisa Keller	6–4, 5–7, 6–3
Loss	2.	October 9, 1988	Corpus Christi, United States	Hard	(Japan) Nana Miyagi	(United States) Eleni Rossides (United States) Shaun Stafford	3–6, 6–3, 5–7
Loss	3.	February 13, 1989	Hørsholm, Denmark	Carpet	(United States) Anne-Marie Walson	(Denmark) Lone Vandborg (Denmark) Tine Scheuer-Larsen	1–6, 5–7
Loss	4.	June 25, 1989	Querétaro, Mexico	Hard	(United States) Leslie Hakala	(Denmark) Henriette Kjær Nielsen (Denmark) Lone Vandborg	4–6, 6–2, 6–7
Win	3.	August 20, 1989	Chatham, United States	Hard	(United States) Kathy Foxworth	(United States) Jean Ceniza (United States) Stella Sampras	6–3, 6–4
Loss	5.	October 15, 1989	Mobile, United States	Hard	(United States) Kathy Foxworth	(Poland) Renata Baranski (United States) Sandy Collins	3–6, 4–6
Loss	6.	June 10, 1990	Miramar, United States	Hard	(United States) Kathy Foxworth	(United States) Ronni Reis (United States) Lisa Raymond	4–6, 5–7
Win	4.	August 6, 1990	Lebanon, United States	Hard	(United States) Kathy Foxworth	(Israel) Ilana Berger (Israel) Limor Zaltz	6–4, 4–1 RET.
Win	5.	March 9, 1992	Monterrey, Mexico	Hard	(Mexico) Lucila Becerra	(Cuba) Rita Pichardo (Cuba) Belkis Rodríguez	6–4, 6–4
