= Ann Stephenson Cameron =

American tennis player

- Country (sports): United States
- Born: August 22, 1967 (age 58)
- Prize money: $19,196

Singles
- Highest ranking: No. 247 (Feb 14, 1994)

Grand Slam singles results
- Australian Open: Q1 (1994)

Doubles
- Highest ranking: No. 602 (Oct 15, 1990)

Ann Stephenson Cameron (born August 22, 1967) is an American former professional tennis player. She competed under her maiden name, Ann Stephenson, until her marriage to TV news reporter Alex Cameron.

Stephenson Cameron, who grew up in Columbia, Missouri, played collegiate tennis for the University of North Carolina while studying for a journalism degree. She later featured on the professional tour and reached a best singles world ranking of 247, with her best WTA Tour performance a third round appearance at Stratton Mountain in 1993.

== ITF finals ==
=== Singles: 1 (0–1) ===
Outcome	No.	Date	Tournament	Surface	Opponent	Score
Runner-up	1.	Jan 1992	ITF New Braunfels, United States	Hard	(United States) Stella Sampras	1–6, 5–7
