= 2005 NCAA Division I tennis championships =

The 2005 NCAA Division I Tennis Championships refer to one of two NCAA-sponsored events held during May and June 2005 to determine the national champions of men's and women's collegiate tennis in the United States:

- 2005 NCAA Division I Men's Tennis Championships – the 59th annual men's national championships, held at the Mitchell Tennis Center at Texas A&M University in College Station, Texas
- 2005 NCAA Division I Women's Tennis Championships– the 24th annual women's national championships, held at the Dan Magill Tennis Complex at the University of Georgia in Athens, Georgia

This was the final year that the men's and women's tournaments were held at separate sites. Starting in 2006, the two events would be held jointly.

== See also ==
- NCAA Division II Tennis Championships (Men, Women)
- NCAA Division III Tennis Championships (Men, Women)
