= Diane Donnelly =

American tennis player

- Full name: Diane Donnelly Stone
- Country (sports): United States

Doubles
- Career titles: 2 ITF
- Highest ranking: No. 209 (September 14, 1987)

Grand Slam doubles results
- US Open: 1R (1987)

Diane Donnelly Stone is an American former professional tennis player.

Donnelly, along with Katrina Adams, won the 1987 NCAA doubles championship, while competing for Northwestern University. The pair featured together in the women's doubles main draw at the 1987 US Open. She also played in some professional satellite tournaments and reached a career high world ranking of 209 in doubles, winning two ITF titles.

Both Donnelly and her sister Tracey, who played collegiate tennis, have lived with Type I diabetes since childhood and have an annual scholarship named after them to help student-athletes with diabetes.

== ITF finals ==
=== Doubles: 2 (2–0) ===
Result	No.	Date	Tournament	Surface	Partner	Opponents	Score
Win	1.	January 11, 1987	Chicago, United States	Hard	(United States) Katrina Adams	(United States) Mary-Lou Daniels (South Africa) Yvonne Vermaak	6–4, 6–3
Win	2.	August 2, 1987	Chatham, United States	Hard	(United States) Katrina Adams	(United States) Jennifer Fuchs (Australia) Robyn Lamb	7–5, 6–3
