= Stella Sampras =

American tennis player

- Full name: Stella Sampras-Webster
- Country (sports): United States
- Born: 9 March 1969 (age 56) Potomac, Maryland, US
- Prize money: $17,237

Singles
- Career record: 26–12
- Career titles: 2 ITF
- Highest ranking: No. 248 (July 27, 1992)

Grand Slam singles results
- US Open: Q1 (1992)

Doubles
- Career record: 11–8
- Career titles: 1 ITF
- Highest ranking: No. 142 (November 9, 1992)

Grand Slam doubles results
- Wimbledon: Q3 (1992)
- US Open: 2R (1992)

Stella Sampras-Webster (born March 9, 1969) is an American former professional tennis player.

== Biography ==
Born in Potomac, Maryland to Greek-American parents, Sampras (Greek: Σάμπρα, romanized: Sampra) is one of four siblings. Her younger brother is tennis player Pete Sampras. She grew up in Los Angeles and played college tennis for the UCLA Bruins from 1987 to 1991, earning All-American honors on four occasions. In her freshman year she teamed up with Allison Cooper to win the NCAA doubles championship.

Sampras competed briefly on the professional tour, reaching a career best singles ranking of 248, with two ITF titles to her name. As a doubles player she twice appeared in the main draw of the US Open and was ranked as high as 142 in the world.

Since 1996, she has been the head coach of UCLA women's tennis.

Sampras is married to marketing executive Steve Webster, with whom she has twin daughters, born in 2005.

== ITF Circuit finals ==
=== Singles: 2 (2 titles) ===
Outcome	No.	Date	Tournament	Surface	Opponent	Score
Winner	1.	January 26, 1992	ITF New Braunfels, United States	Hard	(United States) Ann Stephenson	6–1, 7–5
Winner	2.	January 19, 1992	ITF Woodlands, United States	Hard	(Netherlands) Claire Wegink	6–0, 6–3

=== Doubles: 1 (1 title, 1 runner-up) ===
Outcome	Date	Tournament	Surface	Partner	Opponents	Score
Runner-up	August 20, 1989	ITF Chatham, United States	Hard	(United States) Jean Ceniza	(United States) Vincenza Procacci (United States) Kathy Foxworth	3–6, 4–6
Winner	January 12, 1992	ITF Woodlands, United States	Hard	(United States) Kirsten Dreyer	(United States) Dierdre Herman (United States) Wendy Nelson	6–3, 6–4
