= Katrina Adams =

American tennis player

Katrina M. Adams
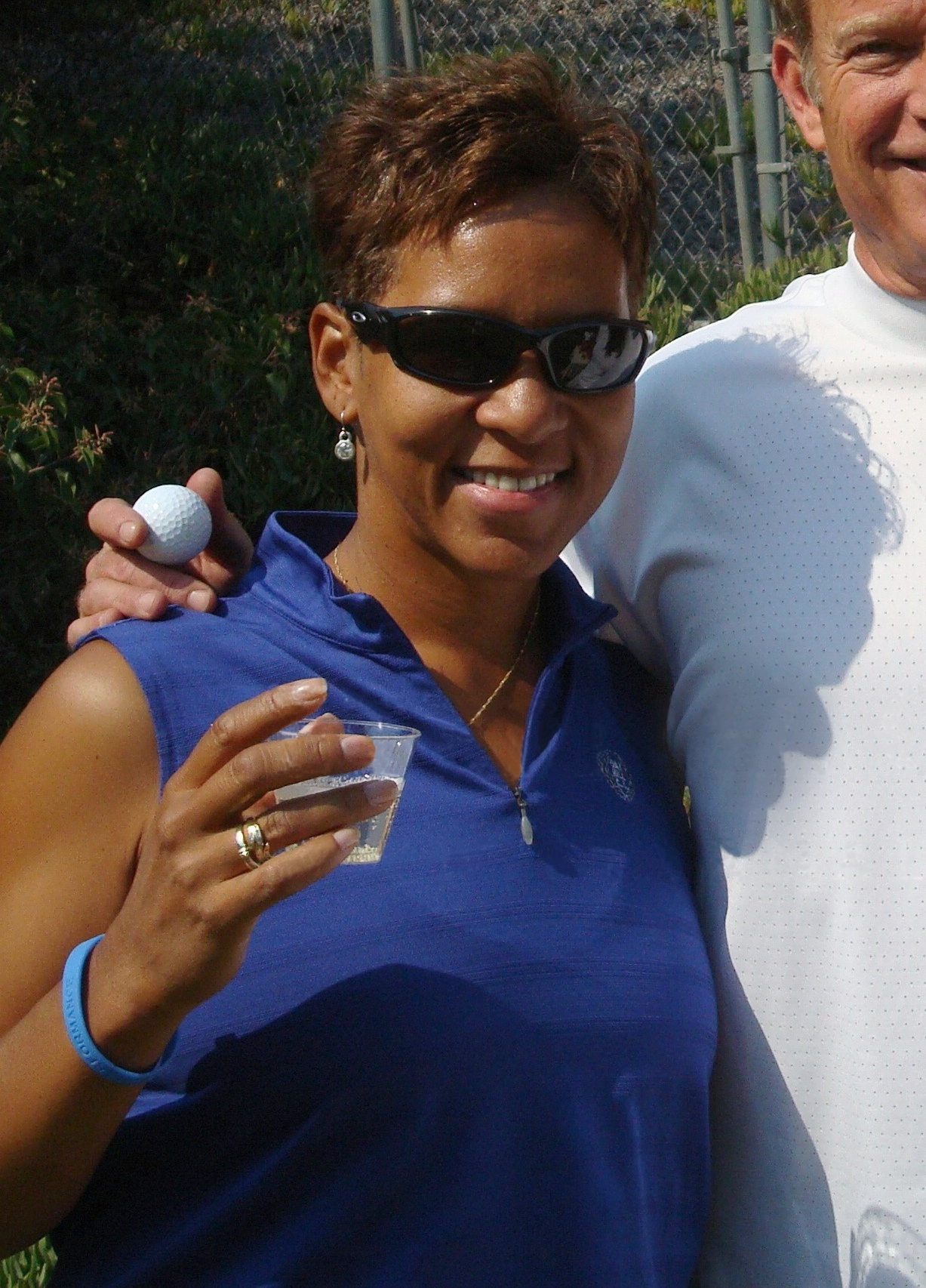
- Country (sports): United States
- Residence: Yonkers, New York, US
- Born: August 5, 1968 (age 58) Chicago, Illinois, US
- Height: 5 ft 5 in (1.65 m)
- Turned pro: 1988
- Retired: 1999
- Plays: Right-handed (two-handed backhand)
- Prize money: $1,294,235

Singles
- Career record: 182–194
- Career titles: 0 WTA, 1 ITF
- Highest ranking: No. 67 (May 8, 1989)

Grand Slam singles results
- Australian Open: 3R (1992)
- French Open: 1R (1988, 1989, 1992, 1996)
- Wimbledon: 4R (1988)
- US Open: 3R (1995)

Doubles
- Career record: 419–226
- Career titles: 20 WTA, 7 ITF
- Highest ranking: No. 8 (August 14, 1989)

Grand Slam doubles results
- Australian Open: QF (1992)
- French Open: QF (1988, 1989, 1992, 1993, 1995, 1996)
- Wimbledon: SF (1988)
- US Open: QF (1991, 1994)
Medal record
Representing United States
Summer Universiade
Bronze medal – third place	1987 Zagreb	Mixed doubles
Bronze medal – third place	1987 Zagreb	Women's doubles
Bronze medal – third place	1991 Sheffield	Mixed doubles

Katrina M. Adams (born August 5, 1968) is an American tennis executive and former professional tennis player from Chicago. She was the president and CEO of the United States Tennis Association and chair of the US Open, as well as the chair of the International Tennis Federation Fed Cup and Gender Equality in Tennis committees. As a player, Adams was a doubles specialist, reaching the quarterfinal stage or better at all four Grand Slams as well as achieving a career-high doubles ranking of no. 8 (August 1989). Her book, Own the Arena: Getting Ahead, Making a Difference, and Succeeding as the Only One was published in 2021.

== Early life ==
Adams joined a tennis program on Chicago's West Side when she was six years old. She attended Whitney Young High School, becoming the Illinois High School Association's first Chicago Public School and first African American singles champion in 1983 and 1984. While attending Northwestern University, she won the National Collegiate Athletic Association (NCAA) doubles title with Diane Donnelly in 1987, and was twice voted All-American.

== Results ==
Adams won seven of her 20 WTA doubles titles between 1987 and 1996 partnering Zina Garrison, including the 1988 World Doubles Championships.

Her best Grand Slam singles result was in the 1988 Wimbledon Championships when she reached the fourth round, losing in three sets to Chris Evert. The same year, she was Wimbledon doubles semifinalist with Zina Garrison.

== Awards ==
Adams twice won the annual WTA Player Service Award in 1996 and 1997.

As alumni, in June 2024, Adams will be presented with an honorary degree during Northwestern's 166th Commencement ceremony.

== Post-retirement ==
Adams has been a television commentator for the Tennis Channel since 2003, a regular contributor to CBS Sports Network all-female sports panel We Need to Talk and is also an executive director of the Harlem Junior Tennis and Education Program.

In January 2015, Adams became president, chairman and CEO of the United States Tennis Association, becoming the first former professional tennis player, first African-American.

In 2016, Adams became Chairperson of the International Tennis Federation (ITF) Fed Cup committee, which governs the Fed Cup.

Adams also serves on the board of directors for the International Tennis Hall of Fame.

== WTA Tour finals ==
=== Singles 2 (0–2) ===
Legend
Grand Slam tournaments (0/0)
WTA Championships (0/0)
Tier I (0/0)
Tier II (0/0)
Tier III (0/0)
Tier IV & V (0/2)

Result	W-L	Date	Tournament	Surface	Opponent	Score
Loss	0–1	Feb 1988	Wellington, New Zealand	Hard	(Canada) Jill Hetherington	6–1, 6–1
Loss	0–2	Nov 1991	Brentwood, US	Hard (i)	(Belgium) Sabine Appelmans	6–2, 6–4

=== Doubles 36 (20–16) ===
Legend
Grand Slam tournaments (0/0)
Olympic Gold (0/0)
WTA Championships (0/0)
Virginia Slims (2/0)
Tier I (1/1)
Tier II (4/5)
Tier III (6/4)
Tier IV & V (7/6)

Result	W-L	Date	Tournament	Surface	Partner	Opponents	Score
Win	1–0	Dec 1987	Guarujá, Brazil	Hard	(United States) Cheryl Jones	(Canada) Jill Hetherington (Argentina) Mercedes Paz	6–4, 4–6, 6–4
Win	2–0	Mar 1988	Boca Raton, US	Hard	(United States) Zina Garrison	(West Germany) Claudia Kohde-Kilsch (Czechoslovakia) Helena Suková	4–6, 7–5, 6–4
Loss	2–1	Apr 1988	Amelia Island, US	Clay	(United States) Penny Barg	(United States) Zina Garrison (West Germany) Eva Pfaff	6–4, 2–6, 6–7^{(5–7)}
Win	3–1	Apr 1988	Houston, US	Clay	(United States) Zina Garrison	(United States) Lori McNeil (United States) Martina Navratilova	6–7^{(4–7)}, 6–2, 6–4
Loss	3–2	Oct 1988	Indianapolis, US	Hard (i)	(United States) Zina Garrison	(Soviet Union) Larisa Savchenko (Soviet Union) Natasha Zvereva	2–6, 1–6
Win	4–2	Nov 1988	Tokyo, Japan	Carpet (i)	(United States) Zina Garrison	(United States) Gigi Fernández (United States) Robin White	7–5, 7–5
Win	5–2	Jan 1989	Tokyo, Japan	Carpet (i)	(United States) Zina Garrison	(United States) Mary Joe Fernández (West Germany) Claudia Kohde-Kilsch	6–3, 3–6, 7–6^{(7–5)}
Win	6–2	Feb 1989	San Antonio, US	Hard	(United States) Pam Shriver	(United States) Patty Fendick (Canada) Jill Hetherington	3–6, 6–1, 6–4
Win	7–2	Apr 1989	Houston, US	Clay	(United States) Zina Garrison	(United States) Gigi Fernández (United States) Lori McNeil	6–3, 6–4
Win	8–2	May 1989	Geneva, Switzerland	Clay	(United States) Lori McNeil	(Soviet Union) Larisa Savchenko (Soviet Union) Natalia Zvereva	2–6, 6–3, 6–4
Win	9–2	Jun 1989	Eastbourne, UK	Grass	(United States) Zina Garrison	(Czechoslovakia) Jana Novotná (Czechoslovakia) Helena Suková	6–3 ret.
Win	10–2	Oct 1989	Brighton, UK	Carpet	(United States) Lori McNeil	(Australia) Hana Mandlíková (Czechoslovakia) Jana Novotná	4–6, 7–6^{(9–7)}, 6–4
Win	11–2	Oct 1989	Indianapolis, US	Hard (i)	(United States) Lori McNeil	(West Germany) Claudia Porwik (Soviet Union) Larisa Savchenko	6–4, 6–4
Loss	11–3	Nov 1990	Indianapolis, US	Hard (i)	(Canada) Jill Hetherington	(United States) Patty Fendick (United States) Meredith McGrath	1–6, 1–6
Loss	11–4	Feb 1991	Oklahoma City, US	Hard (i)	(Canada) Jill Hetherington	(United States) Meredith McGrath (United States) Anne Smith	2–6, 4–6
Loss	11–5	Jul 1991	Westchester, US	Hard	(United States) Lori McNeil	(South Africa) Rosalyn Fairbank (South Africa) Lise Gregory	5–7, 4–6
Win	12–5	Aug 1991	Albuquerque, US	Hard	(France) Isabelle Demongeot	(South Africa) Lise Gregory (United States) Peanut Louie Harper	6–7^{(2–7)}, 6–4, 6–3
Loss	12–6	Nov 1991	Indianapolis, US	Hard (i)	(Argentina) Mercedes Paz	(United States) Patty Fendick (United States) Gigi Fernández	4–6, 2–6
Loss	12–7	Feb 1992	Chicago, US	Carpet	(United States) Zina Garrison	(United States) Martina Navratilova (United States) Pam Shriver	4–6, 6–7^{(7–9)}
Loss	12–8	Feb 1992	Oklahoma City, US	Hard (i)	(Netherlands) Manon Bollegraf	(United States) Lori McNeil (Australia) Nicole Provis	6–3, 4–6, 6–7^{(6–8)}
Win	13–8	Nov 1992	Indianapolis, US	Hard (i)	(South Africa) Elna Reinach	(United States) Sandy Collins (United States) Mary-Lou Daniels	5–7, 6–2, 6–4
Win	14–8	Feb 1993	Chicago, US	Carpet	(United States) Zina Garrison	(United States) Amy Frazier (United States) Kimberly Po	7–6^{(9–7)}, 6–3
Loss	14–9	Feb 1993	Oklahoma City, US	Hard (i)	(Netherlands) Manon Bollegraf	(United States) Patty Fendick (United States) Zina Garrison	3–6, 2–6
Win	15–9	Mar 1993	Houston, US	Clay	(Netherlands) Manon Bollegraf	(Russia) Eugenia Maniokova (Slovakia) Radomira Zrubáková	6–3, 5–7, 7–6^{(9–7)}
Loss	15–10	Mar 1993	Hilton Head, US	Clay	(Netherlands) Manon Bollegraf	(United States) Gigi Fernández (Belarus) Natalia Zvereva	3–6, 1–6
Win	16–10	Nov 1993	Quebec City, Canada	Hard (i)	(Netherlands) Manon Bollegraf	(Bulgaria) Katerina Maleeva (France) Nathalie Tauziat	6–4, 6–4
Win	17–10	Nov 1993	Philadelphia, US	Carpet	(Netherlands) Manon Bollegraf	(Spain) Conchita Martínez (Latvia) Larisa Neiland	6–2, 4–6, 7–6^{(9–7)}
Loss	17–11	Feb 1994	Oklahoma City, US	Hard (i)	(Netherlands) Manon Bollegraf	(United States) Patty Fendick (United States) Meredith McGrath	6–7^{(3–7)}, 2–6
Loss	17–12	Mar 1994	Houston, US	Clay	(United States) Zina Garrison	(Netherlands) Manon Bollegraf (United States) Martina Navratilova	4–6, 2–6
Loss	17–13	Feb 1995	Oklahoma City, US	Hard (i)	(Netherlands) Brenda Schultz	(United States) Nicole Arendt (Italy) Laura Golarsa	4–6, 3–6
Loss	17–14	Oct 1995	Oakland, US	Carpet	(United States) Zina Garrison	(United States) Lori McNeil (Czech Republic) Helena Suková	6–3, 4–6, 3–6
Loss	17–15	Feb 1996	Oklahoma City, US	Hard (i)	(United States) Debbie Graham	(United States) Chanda Rubin (Netherlands) Brenda Schultz-McCarthy	4–6, 3–6
Win	18–15	May 1996	Budapest, Hungary	Clay	(United States) Debbie Graham	(Czech Republic) Radka Bobková (Czech Republic) Eva Melicharová	6–3, 7–6^{(7–3)}
Win	19–15	May 1996	Cardiff, UK	Clay	(South Africa) Mariaan de Swardt	(Belgium) Els Callens (Belgium) Laurence Courtois	6–0, 6–4
Win	20–15	Jun 1997	Birmingham, UK	Grass	(Latvia) Larisa Neiland	(France) Nathalie Tauziat (United States) Linda Wild	6–2, 6–3
Loss	20–16	Jan 1998	Sydney, Australia	Hard	(United States) Meredith McGrath	(Switzerland) Martina Hingis (Czech Republic) Helena Suková	1–6, 2–6

== ITF finals ==
=== Singles (1–1) ===
Result	No.	Date	Tournament	Surface	Opponent	Score
Loss	1.	August 3, 1987	Lebanon, United States	Hard	(United States) Shaun Stafford	6–3, 1–6, 3–6
Win	2.	January 21, 1991	New Braunfels, United States	Hard	(Argentina) María Luciana Reynares	7–6^{(7)}, 2–6, 6–2

=== Doubles (8–3) ===
Result	No.	Date	Tournament	Surface	Partner	Opponents	Score
Win	1.	June 30, 1986	Tampa, United States	Clay	(Mexico) Heliane Steden	(United States) Brenda Niemeyer (United States) Karen Schimper	4–6, 6–1, 6–3
Win	2.	July 14, 1986	Midland, United States	Clay	(United States) Sonia Hahn	(Australia) Alison Scott (New Zealand) Ruth Seeman	2–6, 6–3, 6–4
Win	3.	January 5, 1987	Chicago, United States	Hard	(United States) Diane Donnelly	(United States) Mary Lou Daniels (South Africa) Yvonne Vermaak	6–4, 6–3
Loss	4.	June 15, 1987	Birmingham, United States	Hard	(United States) Sonia Hahn	(Netherlands) Ingelise Driehuis (South Africa) Lise Gregory	6–7^{(0)}, 6–4, 6–2
Win	5.	July 20, 1987	Philadelphia, United States	Hard	(Netherlands) Ingelise Driehuis	(United States) Kathy Foxworth (United States) Tammy Whittington	6–3, 6–4
Win	6.	July 27, 1987	Chatham, United States	Hard	(United States) Diane Donnelly	(United States) Jennifer Fuchs (Australia) Robyn Lamb	7–5, 6–3
Win	7.	September 24, 1990	Chicago, United States	Hard	(United States) Lynn Nabors	(Canada) Jill Hetherington (United States) Mary Lou Daniels	6–4, 6–4
Loss	8.	January 28, 1991	Midland, United States	Hard	(Canada) Helen Kelesi	(United States) Meredith McGrath (United States) Anne Smith	5–7, 5–7
Win	9.	September 23, 1991	Chicago, United States	Hard	(United States) Mary Lou Daniels	(United States) Beverly Bowes-Hackney (United States) Cammy Macgregor	6–4, 6–3
Loss	10.	February 12, 1996	Midland, United States	Hard	(United States) Debbie Graham	(United States) Angela Lettiere (United States) Corina Morariu	6–7, 6–7
Win	11.	October 7, 1996	Sedona, United States	Hard	(United States) Debbie Graham	(United States) Angela Lettiere (United States) Shannan McCarthy	6–4, 6–1

== Performance timelines ==
Key
W	F	SF	QF	#R	RR	Q#	DNQ	A	NH

(W) winner; (F) finalist; (SF) semifinalist; (QF) quarterfinalist; (#R) rounds 4, 3, 2, 1; (RR) round-robin stage; (Q#) qualification round; (DNQ) did not qualify; (A) absent; (NH) not held; (SR) strike rate (events won / competed); (W–L) win–loss record.

=== Singles ===
Tournament	1987	1988	1989	1990	1991	1992	1993	1994	1995	1996	1997	W–L
Grand Slam tournaments
Australian Open	A	1R	2R	1R	A	3R	Q2	Q1	Q1	A	1R	4–8
French Open	A	1R	1R	Q2	Q2	1R	Q1	Q3	A	1R	Q1	4–9
Wimbledon	A	4R	3R	1R	Q2	2R	Q1	1R	1R	2R	Q2	18–10
US Open	Q2	1R	1R	1R	Q3	A	1R	1R	3R	1R	Q3	7–10

=== Doubles ===
Tournament	1986	1987	1988	1989	1990	1991	1992	1993	1994	1995	1996	1997	1998	1999	W–L
Grand Slam tournaments
Australian Open	A	A	3R	3R	3R	A	QF	3R	2R	1R	A	2R	1R	1R	13–10
French Open	A	A	QF	QF	3R	3R	QF	QF	1R	QF	QF	2R	3R	1R	25–12
Wimbledon	A	A	SF	QF	3R	QF	3R	1R	2R	3R	QF	3R	3R	1R	23–12
US Open	1R	1R	2R	3R	3R	QF	A	3R	QF	3R	2R	3R	2R	1R	19–13
