= 2022 NCAA Division I Women's Tennis Championships =

- Date: May 6–28, 2022
- Edition: 40th
- Location: First, second, third rounds: Campus sites Remainder: Champaign, Illinois
- Venue: Khan Outdoor Tennis Complex; Hosted by: University of Illinois Urbana-Champaign

Champions

Women's singles
- Peyton Stearns (Texas)

Women's doubles
- Jaeda Daniel and Nell Miller (NC State)

Women's team
- Texas
- NCAA Division I Women's Tennis Championships

The 2022 NCAA Division I Women's Tennis Championships were the women's tennis tournaments played from May 6 to May 28, 2022, at campus sites and Champaign, Illinois at the Khan Outdoor Tennis Complex. It was the 40th edition of the NCAA Division I Women's Tennis Championship.

== Women's team championship ==
There were 64 teams selected to the women's team championship, 31 of which were automatic qualifiers from each Division I conference. The remaining 33 teams were selected at-large. Teams played two rounds of single-elimination matches in groups of four from May 6–7 or 7–8 at campus sites; the winners of those regionals advanced to a super-regional round, also held at campus sites. The remaining eight teams advanced to the championship rounds in Champaign, Illinois.

=== Automatic qualifiers ===
The following 31 teams were automatic qualifiers, representing their conferences:

Conference	Team
ACC	Duke
American	Memphis
ASUN	Stetson
Atlantic 10	VCU
Big East	Xavier
Big Sky	Northern Arizona
Big South	Charleston Southern
Big Ten	Michigan
Big 12	Texas
Big West	UC Santa Barbara
CAA	William & Mary
Conference USA	Old Dominion
Horizon	Youngstown State
Ivy	Princeton
MAAC	Quinnipiac
MAC	Ball State
MEAC	South Carolina State
Missouri Valley	Illinois State
Mountain West	San Diego State
Northeast	Bryant
Ohio Valley	Southeast Missouri State
Pac-12	Stanford
Patriot	Army
SEC	Texas A&M
Southern	Furman
Southland	Texas A&M–Corpus Christi
Summit	Denver
Sun Belt	South Alabama
SWAC	Jackson State
WAC	New Mexico State
West Coast	Pepperdine

=== National seeds ===
Sixteen teams were selected as national seeds, and were guaranteed to host for the first two rounds, if they submitted a bid and met criteria.

1. North Carolina (semifinals)
2. Oklahoma (runner-up)
3. Duke (semifinals)
4. Texas (National Champions)
5. Virginia (quarterfinals)
6. NC State (quarterfinals)
7. Texas A&M (quarterfinals)
8. Pepperdine (quarterfinals)
9. Miami (FL) (Super Regionals)
10. Ohio State (second round)
11. California (Super Regionals)
12. Oklahoma State (Super Regionals)
13. Auburn (Super Regionals)
14. Georgia (Super Regionals)
15. Stanford (Super Regionals)
16. Florida (Super Regionals)

=== Bracket ===
Bold indicates winner. Host institutions for the first two rounds and Super Regionals are marked with an asterisk (*).

**First Round**; May 6 or 7, 2022; Campus sites
1	**North Carolina***	**4**
South Carolina State	0
Chapel Hill, North Carolina
Iowa State	0
**South Carolina**	**4**
**Florida State***	**4**
FIU	2
Gainesville, Florida
South Alabama	0
16	**Florida***	**4**
9	**Miami (FL)***	**4**
Stetson	0
Coral Gables, Florida
Alabama	0
**UCF**	**4**
**USC**	**4**
San Diego State State	0
Malibu, California
Denver	0
8	**Pepperdine***	**4**
5	**Virginia***	**4**
Youngstown State	0
Charlottesville, Virginia
Army	0
**Princeton**	**4**
**UCLA**	**4**
Arkansas	1
Stillwater, Oklahoma
New Mexico State	0
12	**Oklahoma State***	**4**
13	**Auburn***	**5**
Jackson State	0
Auburn, Alabama
Memphis	1
**Georgia Tech**	**4**
**Michigan**	**4**
Oregon	0
Austin, Texas
Ball State	0
4	**Texas***	**4**
3	**Duke***	**4**
Quinnipiac	0
Durham, North Carolina
Furman	0
**Old Dominion**	**4**
**Wake Forest**	**4**
Northwestern	2
Athens, Georgia
Charleston Southern	0
14	**Georgia***	**4**
11	**California***	**4**
Northern Arizona	0
Berkeley, California
**Texas Tech**	**4**
Loyola Marymount	1
**Tennessee**	**4**
VCU	1
Raleigh, North Carolina
William & Mary	0
6	**NC State***	**4**
7	**Texas A&M***	**4**
Texas A&M–Corpus Christi	0
College Station, Texas
Washington	2
**Baylor**	**4**
**Vanderbilt**	**4**
Xavier	0
Columbus, Ohio
Illinois State	0
10	**Ohio State***	**4**
15	**Stanford***	**4**
Southeast Missouri State	0
Stanford, California
**UC Santa Barbara**	**4**
Kansas	3
**Arizona State**	**4**
San Diego	1
Norman, Oklahoma
Bryant	0
2	**Oklahoma***	**4**

**Second Round**; May 7 or 8, 2022; Campus sites
1	**North Carolina**	**4**
South Carolina	0
Florida State	1
16	**Florida**	**4**
9	**Miami (FL)**	**4**
UCF	1
USC	1
8	**Pepperdine**	**4**
5	**Virginia**	**4**
Princeton	0
UCLA	2
12	**Oklahoma State**	**4**
13	**Auburn**	**4**
Georgia Tech	3
Michigan	0
4	**Texas**	**4**
3	**Duke**	**4**
Old Dominion	1
Wake Forest	0
14	**Georgia**	**4**
11	**California**	**4**
Texas Tech	0
Tennessee	1
6	**NC State**	**4**
7	**Texas A&M**	**4**
Baylor	1
**Vanderbilt**	**4**
10	Ohio State	2
15	**Stanford**	**4**
UC Santa Barbara	0
Arizona State	3
2	**Oklahoma**	**4**

**Super Regionals**; May 13 or 14, 2022; Campus sites
1	**North Carolina***	**4**
16	Florida	0
9	Miami (FL)	0
8	**Pepperdine***	**4**
5	**Virginia***	**4**
12	Oklahoma State	1
13	Auburn	1
4	**Texas***	**4**
3	**Duke***	**4**
14	Georgia	1
11	California	0
6	**NC State***	**4**
7	**Texas A&M***	**4**
Vanderbilt	0
15	Stanford	1
2	**Oklahoma***	**4**

**Quarterfinals**; May 20, 2022; Champaign, IL
1	**North Carolina**	**4**
8	Pepperdine	3
5	Virginia	2
4	**Texas**	**4**
3	**Duke**	**4**
6	NC State	3
7	Texas A&M	3
2	**Oklahoma**	**4**

**Semifinals**; May 21, 2022; Champaign, IL
1	North Carolina	2
4	**Texas**	**4**
3	Duke	3
2	**Oklahoma**	**4**

**Championship**; May 22, 2022; Champaign, IL
4	**Texas**	**4**
2	Oklahoma	2

Bracket source:

== Women's singles championship ==
There were 64 singles players selected to the women's singles championship, 15 of which were automatic qualifiers from each Division I conference with an eligible team ranked in the ITA Top 125. The remaining 49 players were selected at-large. The tournament was played following the team championship from May 23–28 in Champaign, Illinois.

=== Automatic qualifiers ===
The following 15 players were automatic qualifiers, representing their conferences:

Conference	Player	Team
ACC	Emma Navarro	Virginia
American	Marie Mattel	UCF
ASUN	Catherine Gulihur	North Florida
Atlantic 10	Paola Exposito Diaz-Delgado	VCU
Big Ten	Irina Cantos Siemers	Ohio State
Big 12	Peyton Stearns	Texas
Big West	Shakhnoza Khatamova	UC Santa Barbara
Colonial	Mila Saric	William & Mary
Conference USA	Yuliia Starodubtseva	Old Dominion
Ivy	Daria Frayman	Princeton
Mountain West	Bunyawi Thamchaiwat	San Diego State
Pac-12	Eryn Cayetano	USC
SEC	Sarah Hamner	South Carolina
Southern	Julia Adams	Furman
West Coast	Shiori Fukuda	Pepperdine

=== National seeds ===
The following sixteen players were seeded for this tournament:

1. Emma Navarro (Virginia)
2. Peyton Stearns (Texas) (National Champion)
3. Petra Hule (Florida State)
4. Daria Frayman (Princeton)
5. Cameron Morra (North Carolina)
6. Sarah Hamner (South Carolina)
7. Eryn Cayetano (USC)
8. Carson Branstine (Texas A&M)

Players ranked 9th–16th, listed by last name

- Chloe Beck (Duke)
- Jaeda Daniel (NC State)
- Georgia Drummy (Duke)
- Shiori Fukuda (Pepperdine)
- McCartney Kessler (Florida)
- Mell Reasco (Georgia)
- Irina Cantos Siemers (Ohio State)
- Layne Sleeth (Oklahoma)

=== Draw ===
Bracket:

==== Finals ====
Quarterfinals
Abigail Rencheli (NC State)	2	6^{6}
Connie Ma (Stanford)	6	7^{8}
Fiona Crawley (North Carolina)	6	6
Lisa Zaar (Pepperdine)	3	1
Paola Exposito Diaz-Delgado (VCU)	6	7^{10}
Michaela Bayerlová (Washington State)	1	6^{8}
7	Eryn Cayetano (USC)	1	6	4
2	Peyton Stearns (Texas)	6	1	6

Semifinals
Connie Ma (Stanford)	6	6
Fiona Crawley (North Carolina)	4	4
Paola Exposito Diaz-Delgado (VCU)	3	4
2	Peyton Stearns (Texas)	6	6

Final
Connie Ma (Stanford)	3	2
2	Peyton Stearns (Texas)	6	6

==== Section 1 ====
First round
1	Emma Navarro (Virginia)	6	6
Margarita Skriabina (Texas Tech)	0	0
Carol Lee (Georgia Tech)	6	6
Maria Titova (Kansas)	3	2
Elaine Chervinsky (Virginia)	4	3
Thasaporn Naklo (Iowa State)	6	6
Abigail Rencheli (NC State)	6	6
Loudmilla Bencheikh (Alabama)	1	2
5	Cameron Morra (North Carolina)	6	1	3
Veronika Miroshnichenko (Loyola Marymount)	0	6	6
Salma Ewing (USC)	6	6
Victoria Hu (Princeton)	1	4
9-16	McCartney Kessler (Florida)	6	6
Solymar Colling (San Diego)	1	1
Marie Mattel (UCF)	5	3
Connie Ma (Stanford)	7	6

Second round
1	E Navarro (Virginia)	6	7^{7}
C Lee (Georgia Tech)	4	6^{2}
T Naklo (Iowa State)	7^{7}	5	0
A Rencheli (NC State)	6^{3}	7	6
V Miroshnichenko (Loyola Marymount)	5	4
S Ewing (USC)	7	6
9-16	M Kessler (Florida)	5	4
C Ma (Stanford)	7	6

Third round
1	E Navarro (Virginia)	7	4	3
A Rencheli (NC State)	5	6	6
S Ewing (USC)	2	6	6^{6}
C Ma (Stanford)	6	4	7^{8}

Quarterfinals
A Rencheli (NC State)	2	6^{6}
C Ma (Stanford)	6	7^{8}

==== Section 2 ====
First round
3	Petra Hule (Florida State)	2	5
Kylie Collins (Texas)	6	7
Carolyn Campana (Wake Forest)	3	6	6
Mila Saric (William & Mary)	6	4	4
9-16	Irina Cantos Siemers (Ohio State)	0	3
Tatiana Makarova (Texas A&M)	6	6
Emmanouela Antonaki (Mississippi State)	3	4
Fiona Crawley (North Carolina)	6	6
6	Sarah Hamner (South Carolina)	6	6
Shakhnoza Khatamova (UC Santa Barbara)	2	1
Abigail Forbes (UCLA)	3	3
Lisa Zaar (Pepperdine)	6	6
9-16	Layne Sleeth (Oklahoma)	6	6
Daevenia Achong (Miami (FL))	1	2
Lisa-Marie Rioux (Oklahoma State)	6	4	3
Haley Giavara (California)	4	6	6

Second round
K Collins (Texas)	6	6
C Campana (Wake Forest)	2	3
T Makarova (Texas A&M)	2	4
F Crawley (North Carolina)	6	6
6	S Hamner (South Carolina)	3	6	3
L Zaar (Pepperdine)	6	4	6
9-16	L Sleeth (Oklahoma)	4	0^{ret.}
H Giavara (California)	6	1

Third round
K Collins (Texas)	3	6^{5}
F Crawley (North Carolina)	6	7^{7}
L Zaar (Pepperdine)	7	6
H Giavara (California)	5	2

Quarterfinals
F Crawley (North Carolina)	6	6
L Zaar (Pepperdine)	3	1

==== Section 3 ====
First round
Elysia Bolton (UCLA)	7	6
Kit Gulihur (North Florida)	5	2
Paola Exposito Diaz-Delgado (VCU)	6	6
9-16	Shiori Fukuda (Pepperdine)	4	1
Carmen Corley (Oklahoma)	6	6
Tatum Rice (Arkansas)	4	2
Natasha Subhash (Virginia)	7	6
8	Carson Branstine (Texas A&M)	5	2
Michaela Bayerlová (Washington State)	6	6
Eden Richardson (Miami (FL))	2	0
Jessica Alsola (California)	6	4	4
9-16	Chloe Beck (Duke)	4	6	6
Isabelle Boulais (Ohio State)	5	3
Sabina Machalova (Ole Miss)	7	6
Carson Tanguilig (North Carolina)	6	6
4	Daria Frayman (Princeton)	4	4

Second round
E Bolton (UCLA)	4	3
P E Diaz-Delgado (VCU)	6	6
C Corley (Oklahoma)	3	5
N Subhash (Virginia)	6	7
M Bayerlová (Washington State)	7	6
9-16	C Beck (Duke)	5	2
S Machalova (Ole Miss)	4	1
C Tanguilig (North Carolina)	6	6

Third round
P E Diaz-Delgado (VCU)	3	6	6
N Subhash (Virginia)	6	3	3
M Bayerlová (Washington State)	5	7^{7}	7
C Tanguilig (North Carolina)	7	6^{3}	5

Quarterfinals
P E Diaz-Delgado (VCU)	6	7^{10}
M Bayerlová (Washington State)	1	6^{8}

==== Section 4 ====
First round
Mariia Kozyreva (Saint Mary's)	7^{7}	4	6
Reilly Tran (North Carolina)	6^{5}	6	3
Mananchaya Sawangkaew (Oklahoma State)	6	6
9-16	Yuliia Starodubtseva (Old Dominion)	2	4
Kari Miller (Michigan)	3	1
Bunyawi Thamchaiwat (San Diego State)	6	6
Rebeka Mertena (Tennessee)	1	7^{7}	3
7	Eryn Cayetano (USC)	6	6^{0}	6
Julia Adams (Furman)	2	2
Elizabeth Scotty (North Carolina)	6	6
Ayana Akli (South Carolina)	6	2	3
9-16	Jaeda Daniel (NC State)	0	6	6
Petra Sedlackova (Alabama)	3	1
Alexandra Yepifanova (Stanford)	6	6
Sydni Ratliff (Ohio State)	0	4
2	Peyton Stearns (Texas)	6	6

Second round
M Kozyreva (Saint Mary's)	6	7^{8}
M Sawangkaew (Oklahoma State)	4	6^{6}
B Thamchaiwat (San Diego State)	2	5
7	E Cayetano (USC)	6	7
E Scotty (North Carolina)	6	6
9-16	J Daniel (NC State)	1	3
A Yepifanova (Stanford)	5	6^{4}
2	P Stearns (Texas)	7	7^{7}

Third round
M Kozyreva (Saint Mary's)	1	7^{7}	3
7	E Cayetano (USC)	6	6^{5}	6
E Scotty (North Carolina)	3	6	2
2	P Stearns (Texas)	6	4	6

Quarterfinals
7	E Cayetano (USC)	1	6	4
2	P Stearns (Texas)	6	1	6

== Women's doubles championship ==
There were 32 doubles teams selected to the women's doubles championship, 10 of whom were automatic qualifiers from each Division I conference with an eligible team ranked in the ITA Top 60. The remaining 22 teams were selected at-large. The tournament was played following the team championship from May 23–28 in Champaign, Illinois.

=== Automatic qualifiers ===
The following 10 teams were automatic qualifiers, representing their conferences:

Conference	Player	Team
ACC	Jaeda Daniel	NC State
ACC	Nell Miller	NC State
American	Charlotte Miller	Tulane
American	Lahari Yelamanchili	Tulane
ASUN	Ana Paula Melilo	North Florida
ASUN	Catherine Gulihur	North Florida
Big 12	Alicia Herrero Linana	Baylor
Big 12	Melany Krywoj	Baylor
Big Ten	Irina Cantos Siemers	Ohio State
Big Ten	Sydni Ratliff	Ohio State
Conference USA	Tatsiana Sasnouskaya	Old Dominion
Conference USA	Yuliia Starodubtseva	Old Dominion
Pac-12	Angelica Blake	Stanford
Pac-12	Connie Ma	Stanford
SEC	Jayci Goldsmith	Texas A&M
SEC	Tatiana Makarova	Texas A&M
Southern	Ellie Schoppe	Furman
Southern	Julia Adams	Furman
West Coast	Janice Tjen	Pepperdine
West Coast	Savannah Broadus	Pepperdine

=== National seeds ===
The following eight teams were seeded for this tournament:

1. Jaeda Daniel / Nell Miller (NC State) (National Champions)
2. Elizabeth Scotty / Fiona Crawley (North Carolina)
3. Emma Navarro / Hibah Shaikh (Virginia)
4. Carol Lee / Kate Sharabura (Georgia Tech)

Players ranked 5th–8th, listed by institution

- Alicia Herrero Linana / Melany Krywoj (Baylor)
- Tatsiana Sasnouskaya / Yuliia Starodubtseva (Old Dominion)
- Jayci Goldsmith / Tatiana Makarova (Texas A&M)
- Anna Brylin / Brooke Killingsworth (Wake Forest)

=== Draw ===
Bracket:

==== Finals ====
Semifinals
1	Jaeda Daniel (NC State); Nell Miller (NC State)	7	6
Janice Tjen (Pepperdine); Savannah Broadus (Pepperdine)	5	4
Ayumi Miyamoto (Oklahoma State); Lisa-Marie Rioux (Oklahoma State)	6^{5}	2
Daevenia Achong (Miami (FL)); Eden Richardson (Miami (FL))	7^{7}	6

Final
1	Jaeda Daniel (NC State); Nell Miller (NC State)	6	7
Daevenia Achong (Miami (FL)); Eden Richardson (Miami (FL))	2	5

==== Top half ====
First round
1	Jaeda Daniel (NC State); Nell Miller (NC State)	6	7^{7}
Elysia Bolton (UCLA); Elise Wagle (UCLA)	2	6^{4}
Carmen Corley (Oklahoma); Ivana Corley (Oklahoma)	6	6
Ali DeSpain (Clemson); Samantha Buyckx (Clemson)	3	1
5-8	Tatsiana Sasnouskaya (Old Dominion); Yuliia Starodubtseva (Old Dominion)	6	7
Ana Paula Melilo (North Florida); Kit Gulihur (North Florida)	3	5
Anna Ross (Vanderbilt); Holly Staff (Vanderbilt)	6	6
Maria Olivia Castedo (Notre Dame); Page Freeman (Notre Dame)	3	3
3	Emma Navarro (Virginia); Hibah Shaikh (Virginia)	6	7
Domenika Turkovic (Arizona State); Patrīcija Špaka (Arizona State)	4	5
Janice Tjen (Pepperdine); Savannah Broadus (Pepperdine)	6	6
Anna Arkadianou (Florida State); Petra Hule (Florida State)	2	3
5-8	Alicia Herrero Linana (Baylor); Melany Krywoj (Baylor)	6	3	[11]
Casie Wooten (Wake Forest); Samantha Martinelli (Wake Forest)	4	6	[9]
Carly Briggs (Florida); Marlee Zein (Florida)	6^{2}	4
Ava Hrastar (Georgia Tech); Kylie Bilchev (Georgia Tech)	7^{7}	6

Second round
1	J Daniel (NC State); N Miller (NC State)	6	3	[10]
C Corley (Oklahoma); I Corley (Oklahoma)	1	6	[8]
5-8	T Sasnouskaya (Old Dominion); Y Starodubtseva (Old Dominion)	4	3
A Ross (Vanderbilt); H Staff (Vanderbilt)	6	6
3	E Navarro (Virginia); H Shaikh (Virginia)	1	2
J Tjen (Pepperdine); S Broadus (Pepperdine)	6	6
5-8	A H Linana (Baylor); M Krywoj (Baylor)	6	2	[13]
A Hrastar (Georgia Tech); K Bilchev (Georgia Tech)	1	6	[15]

Quarterfinals
1	J Daniel (NC State); N Miller (NC State)	6	4	[10]
A Ross (Vanderbilt); H Staff (Vanderbilt)	4	6	[6]
J Tjen (Pepperdine); S Broadus (Pepperdine)	6	6
A Hrastar (Georgia Tech); K Bilchev (Georgia Tech)	1	1

Semifinals
1	J Daniel (NC State); N Miller (NC State)	7	6
J Tjen (Pepperdine); S Broadus (Pepperdine)	5	4

==== Bottom half ====
First round
Amelia Rajecki (NC State); Abigail Rencheli (NC State)	4	2
Charlotte Russell (Tulane); Lahari Yelamanchili (Tulane)	6	6
Miyuka Kimoto (Syracuse); Polina Kozyreva (Syracuse)	1	2
5-8	Jayci Goldsmith (Texas A&M); Tatiana Makarova (Texas A&M)	6	6
Diae El Jardi (Rice); Maria Budin (Rice)	1	7	[6]
Cameron Morra (North Carolina); Carson Tanguilig (North Carolina)	6	5	[10]
Ayumi Miyamoto (Oklahoma State); Lisa-Marie Rioux (Oklahoma State)	6	6
4	Carol Lee (Georgia Tech); Kate Sharabura (Georgia Tech)	0	1
Allura Zamarripa (Texas); Peyton Stearns (Texas)	6	6
Angelica Blake (Stanford); Connie Ma (Stanford)	4	2
Daria Kuczer (Tennessee); Tenika McGiffin (Tennessee)	6	4	[10]
5-8	Anna Brylin (Wake Forest); Brooke Killingsworth (Wake Forest)	4	6	[4]
Daevenia Achong (Miami (FL)); Eden Richardson (Miami (FL))	6	7
Ellie Schoppe (Furman); Julia Adams (Furman)	2	5
Irina Cantos Siemers (Ohio State); Sydni Ratliff (Ohio State)	5	6	[9]
2	Elizabeth Scotty (North Carolina); Fiona Crawley (North Carolina)	7	4	[11]

Second round
C Russell (Tulane); L Yelamanchili (Tulane)	2	2
5-8	J Goldsmith (Texas A&M); T Makarova (Texas A&M)	6	6
C Morra (North Carolina); C Tanguilig (North Carolina)	6^{3}	1
A Miyamoto (Oklahoma State); L-M Rioux (Oklahoma State)	7^{7}	6
A Zamarripa (Texas); P Stearns (Texas)	6	6
D Kuczer (Tennessee); T McGiffin (Tennessee)	2	2
D Achong (Miami (FL)); E Richardson (Miami (FL))	6	6
2	E Scotty (North Carolina); F Crawley (North Carolina)	4	1

Quarterfinals
5-8	J Goldsmith (Texas A&M); T Makarova (Texas A&M)	3	6^{3}
A Miyamoto (Oklahoma State); L-M Rioux (Oklahoma State)	6	7^{7}
A Zamarripa (Texas); P Stearns (Texas)	5	7	[5]
D Achong (Miami (FL)); E Richardson (Miami (FL))	7	5	[10]

Semifinals
A Miyamoto (Oklahoma State); L-M Rioux (Oklahoma State)	6^{5}	2
D Achong (Miami (FL)); E Richardson (Miami (FL))	7^{7}	6
