= 2021 NCAA Division I Tennis Championships =

- Date: May 7–22, 2021
- Edition: 75th (Men), 39th (Women)
- Location: First and second rounds: Campus sites Remainder: Orlando, Florida
- Venue: USTA National Campus; Hosted by: University of Central Florida and the Greater Orlando Sports Commission

Champions

Men's singles
- (United States) Sam Riffice (Florida)

Women's singles
- (United States) Emma Navarro (Virginia)

Men's doubles
- (Australia) Patrick Harper and (Australia) Adam Walton (Tennessee)

Women's doubles
- (United States) Makenna Jones and (United States) Elizabeth Scotty (North Carolina)

Men's team
- Florida

Women's team
- Texas
- NCAA Division I Tennis Championships

The 2021 NCAA Division I Tennis Championships was the men's and women's tennis tournaments played concurrently from May 7 to May 28, 2021 at campus sites and Orlando, Florida at the USTA National Campus. It was the 75th edition of the NCAA Division I Men's Tennis Championship and the 39th edition of the NCAA Division I Women's Tennis Championship.

== Men's team championship ==
=== National seeds ===
1. Florida (National Champions)
2. Baylor (Runner-up)
3. Tennessee (semifinals)
4. Texas (semifinals)
5. Virginia (round of 16)
6. North Carolina (round of 16)
7. TCU (quarterfinals)
8. Texas A&M (quarterfinals)
9. UCF (second round)
10. Wake Forest (second round)
11. Georgia (quarterfinals)
12. USC (quarterfinals)
13. South Carolina (round of 16)
14. Kentucky (second round)
15. Ole Miss (round of 16)
16. Illinois (round of 16)

=== Bracket ===
First Round; May 7–8, 2021; National Seed Home Court
1	Florida	4
South Alabama	0
Gainesville, Florida
Duke	2
South Florida	4
Notre Dame	4
Western Michigan	1
Urbana, Illinois
DePaul	1
16	Illinois	4
9	UCF	4
Monmouth	0
Orlando, Florida
Miami (FL)	1
Mississippi State	4
Oklahoma	4
Denver	1
College Station, Texas
New Mexico	1
8	Texas A&M	4
5	Virginia	4
Fairleigh Dickinson	0
Charlottesville, Virginia
LSU	0
Stanford	4
Pepperdine	4
UC Santa Barbara	1
Los Angeles, California
Grand Canyon	0
12	USC	4
13	South Carolina	4
UNC Wilmington	0
Columbia, South Carolina
Florida Gulf Coast (Note: Liberty was originally the automatic qualifier from the ASUN Conference, but was replaced by FGCU due to COVID-19 protocols. FGCU was also unable to participate due to protocols and forfeited.)	Forfeit
NC State
UCLA	1
Northwestern	4
Austin, Texas
Northern Arizona	0
4	Texas	4
3	Tennessee	5
Alabama A&M	0
Knoxville, Tennessee
Memphis	4
Georgia Tech	2
Arizona	4
Michigan	3
Lexington, Kentucky
Cleveland State	1
14	Kentucky	4
11	Georgia	4
East Tennessee State	0
Athens, Georgia
Virginia Tech	2
Texas Tech	4
Oklahoma State	4
Navy	0
Chapel Hill, North Carolina
Presbyterian	0
6	North Carolina	4
7	TCU	4
Arkansas	0
Fort Worth, Texas
Wichita State	3
Arizona State	4
Ohio State	4
VCU	1
Winston-Salem, North Carolina
South Carolina State	0
10	Wake Forest	4
15	Ole Miss	4
Belmont	0
Oxford, Mississippi
Middle Tennessee	0
Tulane	4
Alabama	3
Oregon	4
Waco, Texas
Texas A&M–Corpus Christi	0
2	Baylor	4

Second Round; May 8–9, 2021; National Seed Home Court
1	Florida	4
South Florida	1
Notre Dame	0
16	Illinois	4
9	UCF	2
Mississippi State	4
Oklahoma	1
8	Texas A&M	4
5	Virginia	4
Stanford	2
Pepperdine	2
12	USC	4
13	South Carolina	4
NC State	0
Northwestern	0
4	Texas	4
3	Tennessee	4
Memphis	0
Arizona	4
14	Kentucky	2
11	Georgia	4
Texas Tech	0
Oklahoma State	0
6	North Carolina	4
7	TCU	4
Arizona State	1
Ohio State	4
10	Wake Forest	1
15	Ole Miss	4
Tulane	0
Oregon	0
2	Baylor	4

Round of 16; May 17, 2021; Orlando, FL
1	Florida	4
16	Illinois	0
Mississippi State	0
8	Texas A&M	4
5	Virginia	2
12	USC	4
13	South Carolina	3
4	Texas	4
3	Tennessee	4
Arizona	3
11	Georgia	4
6	North Carolina	3
7	TCU	4
Ohio State	1
15	Ole Miss	1
2	Baylor	4

Quarterfinals; May 20, 2021; Orlando, FL
1	Florida	4
8	Texas A&M	1
12	USC	3
4	Texas	4
3	Tennessee	4
11	Georgia	1
7	TCU	1
2	Baylor	4

Semifinals; May 21, 2021; Orlando, FL
1	Florida	4
4	Texas	0
3	Tennessee	2
2	Baylor	4

Championship; May 22, 2021; Orlando, FL
1	Florida	4
2	Baylor	1

==== Notes ====
Bracket source:

== Women's team championship ==
=== National seeds ===
1. North Carolina (semifinals)
2. Texas (National Champions)
3. Georgia (quarterfinals)
4. UCLA (quarterfinals)

5. Pepperdine (Runner-up)
6. NC State (semifinals)
7. Florida State (quarterfinals)
8. Baylor (second round)

9. UCF (round of 16)
10. Texas A&M (round of 16)
11. Florida (second round)
12. LSU (second round)

13. Georgia Tech (round of 16)
14. Virginia (round of 16)
15. Ohio State (round of 16)
16. California (round of 16)

=== Bracket ===
First Round; May 7, 2021; National Seed Home Court
1	North Carolina	4
South Carolina State	0
Chapel Hill, North Carolina
Arkansas	2
Old Dominion	4
Kentucky	4
Syracuse	3
Berkeley, California
San Jose State	0
16	California	4
9	UCF	4
Charleston Southern	0
Orlando, Florida
FIU	0
Miami (FL)	4
Duke	4
Alabama	0
Waco, Texas
Texas A&M–Corpus Christi	0
8	Baylor	4
5	Pepperdine	4
Northern Arizona	0
Malibu, California
UC Santa Barbara	0
Stanford	4
Michigan	4
Rice	1
Baton Rouge, Louisiana
Boston University	0
12	LSU	4
13	Georgia Tech	4
Georgia Southern	0
Atlanta, Georgia
North Florida	4
Ole Miss	3
Texas Tech	4
San Diego	0
Los Angeles, California
Grand Canyon	0
4	UCLA	4
3	Georgia	4
Austin Peay	0
Athens, Georgia
Furman	2
Wake Forest	4
Tennessee	4
James Madison	0
Charlottesville, Virginia
LIU	0
14	Virginia	4
11	Florida	4
Siena	0
Gainesville, Florida
USC	4
Oklahoma	3
South Carolina	2
Iowa State	4
Raleigh, North Carolina
VCU	0
6	NC State	4
7	Florida State	4
Alabama State	0
Tallahassee, Florida
Oklahoma State	2
Auburn	4
Northwestern	4
Xavier	0
College Station, Texas
Drake	0
10	Texas A&M	4
15	Ohio State	4
UIC	0
Columbus, Ohio
Ball State	0
Vanderbilt	4
Arizona State	4
Mississippi State	0
Austin, Texas
Denver	0
2	Texas	4

Second Round; May 8, 2021; National Seed Home Court
1	North Carolina	4
Old Dominion	0
Kentucky	2
16	California	4
9	UCF	4
Miami (FL)	1
Duke	4
8	Baylor	3
5	Pepperdine	4
Stanford	2
Michigan	4
12	LSU	3
13	Georgia Tech	4
North Florida	0
Texas Tech	0
4	UCLA	4
3	Georgia	4
Wake Forest	1
Tennessee	2
14	Virginia	4
11	Florida	1
USC	4
Iowa State	2
6	NC State	4
7	Florida State	4
Auburn	1
Northwestern	2
10	Texas A&M	4
15	Ohio State	4
Vanderbilt	3
Arizona State	0
2	Texas	4

Round of 16; May 17, 2021; Orlando, FL
1	North Carolina	4
16	California	0
9	UCF	3
Duke	4
5	Pepperdine	4
Michigan	0
13	Georgia Tech	0
4	UCLA	4
3	Georgia	4
14	Virginia	1
USC	1
6	NC State	4
7	Florida State	4
10	Texas A&M	2
15	Ohio State	1
2	Texas	4

Quarterfinals; May 20, 2021; Orlando, FL
1	North Carolina	4
Duke	1
5	Pepperdine	4
4	UCLA	3
3	Georgia	2
6	NC State	4
7	Florida State	0
2	Texas	4

Semifinals; May 21, 2021; Orlando, FL
1	North Carolina	3
5	Pepperdine	4
6	NC State	0
2	Texas	4

Championship; May 22, 2021; Orlando, FL
5	Pepperdine	3
2	Texas	4

Bracket source:

== Men's singles championship ==
=== National seeds ===
1. (Canada) Liam Draxl, Kentucky
2. (Portugal) Daniel Rodrigues, South Carolina
3. (Lebanon) Hady Habib, Texas A&M
4. (France) Valentin Vacherot, Texas A&M
5. (Portugal) Duarte Vale, Florida
6. (United States) Sam Riffice, Florida (National Champion)
7. (United Kingdom) Johannus Monday, Tennessee
8. (Brazil) Gabriel Décamps, UCF

Players ranked 9th–16th, listed by last name

- (United States) Trent Bryde, Georgia
- (Canada) Gabriel Diallo, Kentucky
- (France) Luc Fomba, TCU
- (United Kingdom) Alastair Gray, TCU
- (New Zealand) Finn Reynolds, Ole Miss
- (Chile) Matías Soto, Baylor
- (Germany) Henri Squire, Wake Forest
- (Australia) Adam Walton, Tennessee

=== Draw ===
==== Finals ====
Quarterfinals
1	(Canada) Liam Draxl (Kentucky)	7^{7}	6
8	(Brazil) Gabriel Décamps (UCF)	6^{6}	1
4	(France) Valentin Vacherot (Texas A&M)	3	0
6	(United States) Sam Riffice (Florida)	6	6
(Romania) Adrian Boitan (Baylor)	6	6
(United States) William Blumberg (North Carolina)	4	1
(United States) Aleksandar Kovacevic (Illinois)	1	3
2	(Portugal) Daniel Rodrigues (South Carolina)	6	6

Semifinals
1	(Canada) Liam Draxl (Kentucky)	6^{5}	6	1
6	(United States) Sam Riffice (Florida)	7^{7}	2	6
(Romania) Adrian Boitan (Baylor)	6^{1}	1^{r}
2	(Portugal) Daniel Rodrigues (South Carolina)	7^{7}	3

Final
6	(United States) Sam Riffice (Florida)	3	6	6
2	(Portugal) Daniel Rodrigues (South Carolina)	6	1	4

==== Section 1 ====
First round
1	(Canada) Liam Draxl (Kentucky)	2	6	7^{7}
(United States) John McNally (Ohio State)	6	1	6^{4}
(United States) Axle Nefve (Notre Dame)	6	4	7
(South Africa) Philip Henning (Georgia)	4	6	5
9-16	(Australia) Adam Walton (Tennessee)	7	6
(United Kingdom) James Davis (Denver)	5	2
(United Kingdom) Connor Thomson (South Carolina)	2	1
(United States) Zeke Clark (Illinois)	6	6
8	(Brazil) Gabriel Décamps (UCF)	2	6	7^{8}
(United States) Micah Braswell (Texas)	6	1	6^{6}
(United States) Andy Andrade (Florida)	7^{7}	6
(Portugal) Francisco Rocha (Middle Tenn.)	6^{2}	0
9-16	(France) Luc Fomba (TCU)	6	4	6
(Sweden) Nikola Slavic (Ole Miss)	3	6	4
(Italy) Giovanni Oradini (Mississippi St.)	6	2	6
(Bolivia) Murkel Dellien (Wichita St.)	4	6	2

Second round
1	(Canada) L Draxl (Kentucky)	3	6	6
(United States) A Nefve (Notre Dame)	6	3	4
9-16	(Australia) A Walton (Tennessee)	7^{8}	6
(United States) Z Clark (Illinois)	6^{6}	4
8	(Brazil) G Décamps (UCF)	6	6
(United States) A Andrade (Florida)	1	4
9-16	(France) L Fomba (TCU)	6	3	6
(Italy) G Oradini (Mississippi St.)	2	6	0

Third round
1	(Canada) L Draxl (Kentucky)	3	6	7
9-16	(Australia) A Walton (Tennessee)	6	4	5
8	(Brazil) G Décamps (UCF)	5	6	6
9-16	(France) L Fomba (TCU)	7	3	4

Quarterfinals
1	(Canada) L Draxl (Kentucky)	7^{8}	6
8	(Brazil) G Décamps (UCF)	6^{6}	1

==== Section 2 ====
First round
4	(France) Valentin Vacherot (Texas A&M)	2	7	6
(Sweden) Gustaf Ström (Arizona)	6	5	3
(United States) Riley Smith (Southern California)	7^{7}	6^{5}	7^{7}
(South Africa) Lleyton Cronje (VCU)	6^{5}	7^{7}	6^{5}
9-16	(Chile) Matías Soto (Baylor)	4	3
(United States) Ed Nava (Wake Forest)	6	6
(United States) Ronald Hohmann (LSU)	2	6	6^{4}
(Australia) Rinky Hijikata (North Carolina)	6	4	7^{7}
6	(United States) Sam Riffice (Florida)	1	7	6
(United States) Nathan Ponwith (Arizona St.)	6	5	2
(Mexico) Edson Ortiz (Alabama)	7^{7}	6^{6}	1
(United States) Andres Martin (Georgia Tech)	6^{2}	7^{8}	6
9-16	(New Zealand) Finn Reynolds (Ole Miss)	6	6
(United States) Sean Hill (BYU)	3	3
(United States) Tyler Zink (Georgia)	3	2
(South Africa) Siphosothando Montsi (Illinois)	6	6

Second round
4	(France) V Vacherot (Texas A&M)	6	6
(United States) R Smith (Southern California)	1	2
(United States) E Nava (Wake Forest)	6^{2}	4
(Australia) R Hijikata (North Carolina)	7^{7}	6
6	(United States) S Riffice (Florida)	2	6	6
(United States) A Martin (Georgia Tech)	6	2	0
9-16	(New Zealand) F Reynolds (Ole Miss)	4	6^{4}
(South Africa) S Montsi (Illinois)	6	7^{7}

Third round
4	(France) V Vacherot (Texas A&M)	6	3	6
(Australia) R Hijikata (North Carolina)	2	6	1
6	(United States) S Riffice (Florida)	6	6
(South Africa) S Montsi (Illinois)	2	0

Quarterfinals
4	(France) V Vacherot (Texas A&M)	3	0
6	(United States) S Riffice (Florida)	6	6

==== Section 3 ====
First round
(United States) Janmagnus Johnson (FGCU)	1	6	3
(Romania) Adrian Boitan (Baylor)	6	4	6
(Germany) Florian Broska (Mississippi St.)	6	6
9-16	(Germany) Henri Squire (Wake Forest)	4	2
(Denmark) August Holmgren (San Diego)	7	3	6
(Germany) Tim Sandkaulen (Ole Miss)	5	6	4
(Switzerland) Jeffrey von der Schulenburg (Virginia)	1	0
5	(Portugal) Duarte Vale (Florida)	6	6
(France) Julien Evrard (South Alabama)	4	4
(Portugal) Martim Prata (Tennessee)	6	6
(United Kingdom) Hamish Stewart (Tulane)	4	7^{7}	3
9-16	(Canada) Gabriel Diallo (Kentucky)	6	6^{4}	6
(United States) Cannon Kingsley (Ohio St.)	4	4
(United States) William Blumberg (North Carolina)	6	6
(Australia) Kody Pearson (Tulsa)	2	1
3	(Lebanon) Hady Habib (Texas A&M)	6	6

Second round
(Romania) A Boitan (Baylor)	1	6	6
(Germany) F Broska (Mississippi St.)	6	1	2
(Denmark) A Holmgren (San Diego)	4	7^{7}	6
5	(Portugal) D Vale (Florida)	6	6^{1}	2
(Portugal) M Prata (Tennessee)	6	2	2
9-16	(Canada) G Diallo (Kentucky)	4	6	6
(United States) W Blumberg (North Carolina)	7	6
3	(Lebanon) H Habib (Texas A&M)	5	2

Third round
(Romania) A Boitan (Baylor)	6	5	6
(Denmark) A Holmgren (San Diego)	3	7	4
9-16	(Canada) G Diallo (Kentucky)	3	1
(United States) W Blumberg (North Carolina)	6	6

Quarterfinals
(Romania) A Boitan (Baylor)	6	6
(United States) W Blumberg (North Carolina)	4	1

==== Section 4 ====
First round
(Spain) Adrià Soriano Barrera (Miami (FL))	w/o
(United Kingdom) Millen Hurrion (Kentucky)
(Canada) Alexis Galarneau (NC State)	6	6
9-16	(United States) Trent Bryde (Georgia)	4	4
(United States) Aleksandar Kovacevic (Illinois)	6	6
(United States) Tyler Stice (Auburn)	3	2
(United States) Eliot Spizzirri (Texas)	6	7
7	(United Kingdom) Johannus Monday (Tennessee)	4	5
(Czech Republic) Matěj Vocel (Oklahoma St.)	6	6
(Canada) JC Aguilar (Texas A&M)	3	1
(Israel) Daniel Cukierman (USC)	6	6
9-16	(United Kingdom) Alastair Gray (TCU)	3	4
(United States) Jakub Wojcik (South Fla.)	6	6
(United States) Marcus McDaniel (Georgia Tech)	3	2
(Venezuela) Dimitri Badra (ETSU)	3	4
2	(Portugal) Daniel Rodrigues (South Carolina)	6	6

Second round
(Spain) A Soriano Barrera (Miami (FL))	1	0
(Canada) A Galarneau (NC State)	6	6
(United States) A Kovacevic (Illinois)	6	6
(United States) E Spizzirri (Texas)	1	3
(Czech Republic) M Vocel (Oklahoma St.)	1	6	4
(Israel) D Cukierman (USC)	6	1	6
(United States) J Wojcik (South Fla.)	3	0
2	(Portugal) D Rodrigues (South Carolina)	6	6

Third round
(Canada) A Galarneau (NC State)	6	4	0
(United States) A Kovacevic (Illinois)	4	6	6
(Israel) D Cukierman (USC)	4	6^{5}
2	(Portugal) D Rodrigues (South Carolina)	6	7^{7}

Quarterfinals
(United States) A Kovacevic (Illinois)	1	3
2	(Portugal) D Rodrigues (South Carolina)	6	6

== Women's singles championship ==
=== National seeds ===
1. (United States) Sara Daavettila, North Carolina
2. (Spain) Estela Pérez Somarriba, Miami (FL)
3. (United States) Emma Navarro, Virginia (National Champion)
4. (Serbia) Katarina Jokić, Georgia
5. (United States) Kenya Jones, Georgia Tech
6. (United States) Anna Rogers, NC State
7. (United States) Abigail Forbes, UCLA
8. (United States) McCartney Kessler, Florida

Players ranked 9th–16th, listed by last name

- (United States) Carolyn Campana, Wake Forest
- (United States) Victoria Flores, Georgia Tech
- (Belarus) Viktoriya Kanapatskaya, Syracuse
- (Serbia) Katarina Kozarov, Furman
- (United States) Alexa Noel, Iowa
- (Italy) Giulia Pairone, Florida State
- (Germany) Isabella Pfennig, Miami (FL)
- (United States) Natasha Subhash, Virginia

=== Draw ===
==== Finals ====
Quarterfinals
1	(United States) Sara Daavettila (North Carolina)	6	6
(United States) Christina Rosca (Vanderbilt)	2	4
3	(United States) Emma Navarro (Virginia)	6	6
(United States) Paris Corley (LSU)	2	1
6	(United States) Anna Rogers (NC State)	2	3
(Indonesia) Janice Tjen (Oregon)	6	6
7	(United States) Abigail Forbes (UCLA)	7^{7}	5	3
2	(Spain) Estela Pérez Somarriba (Miami (FL))	6^{5}	7	6

Semifinals
1	(United States) Sara Daavettila (North Carolina)	4	6	2
3	(United States) Emma Navarro (Virginia)	6	2	6
(Indonesia) Janice Tjen (Oregon)	6^{4}	0
2	(Spain) Estela Pérez Somarriba (Miami (FL))	7^{7}	6

Final
3	(United States) Emma Navarro (Virginia)	6	6
2	(Spain) Estela Pérez Somarriba (Miami (FL))	3	1

==== Section 1 ====
First round
1	(United States) Sara Daavettila (North Carolina)	3	6	6
(United States) Solymar Colling (San Diego)	6	1	3
(Hungary) Rebeka Stolmár (UCF)	1	4
(United States) Lea Ma (Georgia)	6	6
9-16	(United States) Carolyn Campana (Wake Forest)	0	6	3
(Ukraine) Yulia Starodubtseva (Old Dominion)	6	4	6
(United States) Jessica Failla (Pepperdine)	7^{7}	7^{7}
(United States) Anna Riedmiller (Denver)	6^{5}	6^{4}
8	(United States) McCartney Kessler (Florida)	6	6
(Canada) Vanessa Wong (Washington)	3	2
(United States) Kelly Chen (Duke)	2	7^{7}	7
(United States) Jada Hart (UCLA)	6	6^{1}	5
9-16	(Germany) Isabella Pfennig (Miami (FL))	3	6	6
(Italy) Anna Turati (Texas)	6	1	2
(France) Emmanuelle Salas (Florida St.)	5	3
(United States) Christina Rosca (Vanderbilt)	7	6

Second round
1	(United States) S Daavettila (North Carolina)	6	6
(United States) L Ma (Georgia)	4	4
(Ukraine) Y Starodubtseva (Old Dominion)	0	0
(United States) J Failla (Pepperdine)	6	6
8	(United States) M Kessler (Florida)	4	4
(United States) K Chen (Duke)	6	6
9-16	(Germany) I Pfennig (Miami (FL))	6	2	3
(United States) C Rosca (Vanderbilt)	2	6	6

Third round
1	(United States) S Daavettila (North Carolina)	6	6
(United States) J Failla (Pepperdine)	3	2
(United States) K Chen (Duke)	6	4	2
(United States) C Rosca (Vanderbilt)	4	6	6

Quarterfinals
1	(United States) S Daavettila (North Carolina)	6	6
(United States) C Rosca (Vanderbilt)	2	4

==== Section 2 ====
First round
3	(United States) Emma Navarro (Virginia)	7^{7}	6
(United States) Haley Giavara (California)	6^{3}	2
(South Africa) Ilze Hattingh (Arizona St.)	6	7^{7}
(United Kingdom) Megan Davies (South Carolina)	3	6^{3}
9-16	(Serbia) Katarina Kozarov (Furman)	6	6
(United States) Michaela Gordon (Stanford)	0	2
(United States) Makenna Jones (North Carolina)	2	2
(United States) Meg Kowalski (Georgia)	6	6
5	(United States) Kenya Jones (Georgia Tech)	5	3
(Turkey) Selin Övünç (Auburn)	7	6
(United States) Alana Wolfberg (Oklahoma St.)	5	5
(United Kingdom) Bronte Murgett (Missouri)	7	7
9-16	(United States) Alexa Noel (Iowa)	6	4	7
(United States) Alana Smith (NC State)	4	6	5
(United States) Paris Corley (LSU)	6	6^{5}	6
(United States) Ahmeir Kyle (Xavier)	2	7^{7}	3

Second round
3	(United States) E Navarro (Virginia)	1	7	6
(South Africa) I Hattingh (Arizona St.)	6	5	0
9-16	(Serbia) K Kozarov (Furman)	5	4
(United States) M Kowalski (Georgia)	7	6
(Turkey) S Övünç (Auburn)	3	7	6
(United Kingdom) B Murgett (Missouri)	6	5	2
9-16	(United States) A Noel (Iowa)	6	3	5
(United States) P Corley (LSU)	1	6	7

Third round
3	(United States) E Navarro (Virginia)	6	6
(United States) M Kowalski (Georgia)	1	1
(Turkey) S Övünç (Auburn)	4	0
(United States) P Corley (LSU)	6	6

Quarterfinals
3	(United States) E Navarro (Virginia)	6	6
(United States) P Corley (LSU)	2	1

==== Section 3 ====
First round
(United States) Anna Campana (Wake Forest)	6	6
(United States) Taylor Bridges (LSU)	0	3
(Thailand) Bunyawi Thamchaiwat (Oklahoma St.)	3	6	7
9-16	(Belarus) Viktoriya Kanapatskaya (Syracuse)	6	3	5
(United States) Fiona Crawley (North Carolina)	5	5
(United States) Ayana Akli (Maryland)	7	7
(United States) Ashley Lahey (Pepperdine)	5	6	3
6	(United States) Anna Rogers (NC State)	7	4	6
(Republic of Ireland) Georgia Drummy (Duke)	4	6	6
(Czech Republic) Sabina Machalová (Ole Miss)	6	4	1
(United States) Karina Miller (Michigan)	6	6
9-16	(United States) Victoria Flores (Georgia Tech)	4	4
(United Kingdom) Indianna Spink (Arkansas)	2	2
(Indonesia) Janice Tjen (Oregon)	6	6
(Uzbekistan) Shakhnoza Khatamova (UC Santa Barbara)	1	6^{5}
4	(Serbia) Katarina Jokić (Georgia)	6	7^{7}

Second round
(United States) A Campana (Wake Forest)	5	2
(Thailand) B Thamchaiwat (Oklahoma St.)	7	6
(United States) A Akli (Maryland)	2	6	4
6	(United States) A Rogers (NC State)	6	4	6
(Republic of Ireland) G Drummy (Duke)	6	6
(United States) K Miller (Michigan)	2	4
(Indonesia) J Tjen (Oregon)	6	6
4	(Serbia) K Jokić (Georgia)	1	4

Third round
(Thailand) B Thamchaiwat (Oklahoma St.)	7	4	1
6	(United States) A Rogers (NC State)	5	6	6
(Republic of Ireland) G Drummy (Duke)	2	4
(Indonesia) J Tjen (Oregon)	6	6

Quarterfinals
6	(United States) A Rogers (NC State)	2	3
(Indonesia) J Tjen (Oregon)	6	6

==== Section 4 ====
First round
(United States) Mia Horvit (South Carolina)	7	6
(Spain) Paola Delgado (VCU)	5	0
(Greece) Emma Antonaki (Mississippi St.)	6	6
9-16	(Italy) Giulia Pairone (Florida St.)	4	4
(United States) Cameron Morra (North Carolina)	2	3
(Spain) Irina Cantos Siemers (Ohio St.)	6	6
(United States) Chloe Beck (Duke)	3	6^{3}
7	(United States) Abigail Forbes (UCLA)	6	7^{7}
(United States) Alexa Graham (North Carolina)	6	6
(Lithuania) Akvilė Paražinskaitė (Kentucky)	1	0
(Russia) Valeriya Zeleva (UCF)	7	4	1
9-16	(United States) Natasha Subhash (Virginia)	5	6	6
(Russia) Tatiana Makarova (Texas A&M)	2	3
(United States) Peyton Stearns (Texas)	6	6
(United States) Salma Ewing (Southern California)	2	3
2	(Spain) Estela Pérez Somarriba (Miami (FL))	6	6

Second round
(United States) M Horvit (South Carolina)	7^{7}	4	4
(Greece) E Antonaki (Mississippi St.)	6^{2}	6	6
(Spain) I Cantos Siemers (Ohio St.)	3	4
7	(United States) A Forbes (UCLA)	6	6
(United States) A Graham (North Carolina)	6^{6}	6	6
9-16	(United States) N Subhash (Virginia)	7^{8}	0	1
(United States) P Stearns (Texas)	2	4
2	(Spain) E Pérez Somarriba (Miami (FL))	6	6

Third round
(Greece) E Antonaki (Mississippi St.)	3	3
7	(United States) A Forbes (UCLA)	6	6
(United States) A Graham (North Carolina)	3	3
2	(Spain) E Pérez Somarriba (Miami (FL))	6	6

Quarterfinals
7	(United States) A Forbes (UCLA)	7^{7}	5	3
2	(Spain) E Pérez Somarriba (Miami (FL))	6^{5}	7	6

== Men's doubles championship ==
=== National seeds ===
1. (New Zealand) Finn Reynolds / (Germany) Tim Sandkaulen, Ole Miss
2. (United States) William Blumberg / (United States) Brian Cernoch, North Carolina
3. (Australia) Patrick Harper / (Australia) Adam Walton, Tennessee (National Champions)
4. (France) Luc Fomba / (United Kingdom) Alastair Gray, TCU

Players ranked 5th–8th, listed by institution

- (Germany) Constantin Frantzen / (Slovenia) Sven Lah, Baylor
- (United States) Trent Bryde / (United States) Tyler Zink, Georgia
- (France) César Bourgois / (Canada) Gabriel Diallo, Kentucky
- (United States) Trey Hilderbrand / (Romania) Bogdan Pavel, UCF

=== Draw ===
==== Finals ====
Semifinals
(Netherlands) Guy den Ouden (Pepperdine) (Germany) Adrian Oetzbach (Pepperdine)	4	1
(United Kingdom) Tad Maclean (Auburn) (United Kingdom) Finn Murgett (Auburn)	6	6
3	(Australia) Patrick Harper (Tennessee) (Australia) Adam Walton (Tennessee)	7	6
5-8	(Germany) Constantin Frantzen (Baylor) (Slovenia) Sven Lah (Baylor)	5	4

Final
(United Kingdom) Tad Maclean (Auburn) (United Kingdom) Finn Murgett (Auburn)	6^{5}	6	[11]
3	(Australia) Patrick Harper (Tennessee) (Australia) Adam Walton (Tennessee)	7^{7}	2	[13]

==== Top half ====
First round
1	(New Zealand) Finn Reynolds (Ole Miss) (Germany) Tim Sandkaulen (Ole Miss)	6	7
(United States) Ed Nava (Wake Forest) (Germany) Henri Squire (Wake Forest)	3	5
(Ukraine) Vlad Lobak (Minnesota) (Estonia) Siim Troost (Minnesota)	6	6
(Peru) Victor Chaw (Samford) (Netherlands) Jim Hendrikx (Samford)	1	3
5-8	(United States) Trent Bryde (Georgia) (United States) Tyler Zink (Georgia)	6	2	[10]
(United States) Conrad Russell (Rice) (United States) Sumit Sarkar (Rice)	3	6	[4]
(Netherlands) Guy den Ouden (Pepperdine) (Germany) Adrian Oetzbach (Pepperdine)	6	6
(United States) Sam Riffice (Florida) (Portugal) Duarte Vale (Florida)	3	3
4	(France) Luc Fomba (TCU) (United Kingdom) Alastair Gray (TCU)	6	6
(Germany) Florian Broska (Mississippi St.) (Austria) Gregor Ramskogler (Mississippi St.)	4	3
(Israel) Daniel Cukierman (USC) (United States) Riley Smith (USC)	6	6
(Canada) JC Aguilar (Texas A&M) (United Kingdom) Bjorn Thomson (Texas A&M)	3	0
5-8	(France) César Bourgois (Kentucky) (Canada) Gabriel Diallo (Kentucky)	5	5
(United States) Tristan McCormick (Notre Dame) (United States) Axel Nefve (Notre Dame)	7	7
(United States) Jordan Chrysostom (Virginia Tech) (United States) Ryan Fishback (Virginia Tech)	2	4
(United Kingdom) Tad Maclean (Auburn) (United Kingdom) Finn Murgett (Auburn)	6	6

Second round
1	(New Zealand) F Reynolds (Ole Miss) (Germany) T Sandkaulen (Ole Miss)	6	3	[4]
(Ukraine) V Lobak (Minnesota) (Estonia) S Troost (Minnesota)	4	6	[10]
5-8	(United States) T Bryde (Georgia) (United States) T Zink (Georgia)	4	7	[4]
(Netherlands) G den Ouden (Pepperdine) (Germany) A Oetzbach (Pepperdine)	6	5	[10]
4	(France) L Fomba (TCU) (United Kingdom) A Gray (TCU)	3	4
(Israel) D Cukierman (USC) (United States) R Smith (USC)	6	6
(United States) T McCormick (Notre Dame) (United States) A Nefve (Notre Dame)	4	6	[7]
(United Kingdom) T Maclean (Auburn) (United Kingdom) F Murgett (Auburn)	6	1	[10]

Quarterfinals
(Ukraine) V Lobak (Minnesota) (Estonia) S Troost (Minnesota)	3	6	[7]
(Netherlands) G den Ouden (Pepperdine) (Germany) A Oetzbach (Pepperdine)	6	3	[10]
(Israel) D Cukierman (USC) (United States) R Smith (USC)	6^{4}	6	[3]
(United Kingdom) T Maclean (Auburn) (United Kingdom) F Murgett (Auburn)	7^{7}	3	[10]

Semifinals
(Netherlands) G den Ouden (Pepperdine) (Germany) A Oetzbach (Pepperdine)	4	1
(United Kingdom) T Maclean (Auburn) (United Kingdom) F Murgett (Auburn)	6	6

==== Bottom half ====
First round
(Belgium) Loïc Cloes (South Alabama) (France) Clément Marzol (South Alabama)	6	6
(United States) Will Grant (Florida) (Denmark) Johannes Ingildsen (Florida)	1	2
(Finland) Patrick Kaukovalta (Alabama) (Italy) Riccardo Roberto (Alabama)	6	6^{4}	[8]
5-8	(United States) Trey Hilderbrand (UCF) (Romania) Bogdan Pavel (UCF)	2	7^{7}	[10]
(United States) Andres Martin (Georgia Tech) (United States) Marcus McDaniel (Georgia Tech)	6	6
(Portugal) Daniel Rodrigues (South Carolina) (United Kingdom) Connor Thomson (South Carolina)	3	3
(United States) Garrett Johns (Duke) (United States) Sean Sculley (Duke)	0	4
3	(Australia) Patrick Harper (Tennessee) (Australia) Adam Walton (Tennessee)	6	6
(United Kingdom) Oscar Cutting (Memphis) (United Kingdom) David Stevenson (Memphis)	4	4
(United Kingdom) Emile Hudd (Oklahoma St.) (Czech Republic) Matěj Vocel (Oklahoma St.)	6	6
(United Kingdom) Ewan Moore (Tulane) (United Kingdom) Hamish Stewart (Tulane)	1	6^{4}
5-8	(Germany) Constantin Frantzen (Baylor) (Slovenia) Sven Lah (Baylor)	6	7^{7}
(United States) Eliot Spizzirri (Texas) (United States) Siem Woldeab (Texas)	6	3	[8]
(India) Rithvik Bollipalli (South Florida) (United States) Jakub Wojcik (South Florida)	4	6	[10]
(United Kingdom) Will Davies (Iowa) (United Kingdom) Oliver Okonkwo (Iowa)	6^{7}	2
2	(United States) William Blumberg (North Carolina) (United States) Brian Cernoch (North Carolina)	7^{7}	6

Second round
(Belgium) L Cloes (South Alabama) (France) C Marzol (South Alabama)	7	6
5-8	(United States) T Hilderbrand (UCF) (Romania) B Pavel (UCF)	5	3
(United States) A Martin (Georgia Tech) (United States) M McDaniel (Georgia Tech)	6^{3}	2
3	(Australia) P Harper (Tennessee) (Australia) A Walton (Tennessee)	7^{7}	6
(United Kingdom) E Hudd (Oklahoma St.) (Czech Republic) M Vocel (Oklahoma St.)	6	4	[8]
5-8	(Germany) C Frantzen (Baylor) (Slovenia) S Lah (Baylor)	1	6	[10]
(India) R Bollipalli (South Florida) (United States) J Wojcik (South Florida)	5	7^{7}	[8]
2	(United States) W Blumberg (North Carolina) (United States) B Cernoch (North Carolina)	7	6^{3}	[10]

Quarterfinals
(Belgium) L Cloes (South Alabama) (France) C Marzol (South Alabama)	4	2
3	(Australia) P Harper (Tennessee) (Australia) A Walton (Tennessee)	6	6
5-8	(Germany) C Frantzen (Baylor) (Slovenia) S Lah (Baylor)	6	0	[10]
2	(United States) W Blumberg (North Carolina) (United States) B Cernoch (North Carolina)	4	6	[7]

Semifinals
3	(Australia) P Harper (Tennessee) (Australia) A Walton (Tennessee)	7	6
5-8	(Germany) C Frantzen (Baylor) (Slovenia) S Lah (Baylor)	5	4

== Women's doubles championship ==
=== National seeds ===
1. (Spain) Fiona Arrese / (Lithuania) Akvilė Paražinskaitė, Kentucky
2. (United States) Sara Daavettila / (United States) Cameron Morra, North Carolina
3. (United States) Victoria Flores / (United States) Kenya Jones, Georgia Tech
4. (United States) Makenna Jones / (United States) Elizabeth Scotty, North Carolina (National Champions)

Players ranked 5th–8th, listed by institution

- (United States) Chloe Beck / (Czech Republic) Karolína Beránková, Duke
- (United States) McCartney Kessler / (United States) Marlee Zein, Florida
- (Canada) Ariana Arseneault / (Serbia) Katarina Jokić, Georgia
- (United States) Jaeda Daniel / (United States) Adriana Reami, NC State

=== Draw ===
==== Finals ====
Semifinals
(United States) Anna Rogers (NC State) (United States) Alana Smith (NC State)	3	4
4	(United States) Makenna Jones (North Carolina) (United States) Elizabeth Scotty (North Carolina)	6	6
(Canada) Rosie Johanson (Virginia) (United States) Emma Navarro (Virginia)	6	5	[8]
(United States) Kylie Collins (Texas) (Switzerland) Lulu Sun (Texas)	4	7	[10]

Final
4	(United States) Makenna Jones (North Carolina) (United States) Elizabeth Scotty (North Carolina)	7^{7}	4	[10]
(United States) Kylie Collins (Texas) (Switzerland) Lulu Sun (Texas)	6^{3}	6	[8]

==== Top half ====
First round
1	(Spain) Fiona Arrese (Kentucky) (Lithuania) Akvilė Paražinskaitė (Kentucky)	5	6	[10]
(United States) Anna Brylin (Wake Forest) (United States) Brooke Killingsworth (Wake Forest)	7	3	[4]
(United States) Elysia Bolton (UCLA) (United States) Jada Hart (UCLA)	6	6
(Spain) Estela Pérez Somarriba (Miami (FL)) (Germany) Isabella Pfennig (Miami (FL))	3	3
5-8	(United States) Chloe Beck (Duke) (Czech Republic) Karolína Beránková (Duke)	6	4	[10]
(United Kingdom) Megan Davies (South Carolina) (United States) Mia Horvit (South Carolina)	4	6	[8]
(United States) Michaela Gordon (Stanford) (United States) Niluka Madurawe (Stanford)	5	1
(United States) Anna Rogers (NC State) (United States) Alana Smith (NC State)	7	6
4	(United States) Makenna Jones (North Carolina) (United States) Elizabeth Scotty (North Carolina)	3	6	[14]
(United States) Gia Cohen (Georgia Tech) (United States) Ava Hrastar (Georgia Tech)	6	3	[12]
(United States) Julia Adams (Furman) (Serbia) Katarina Kozarov (Furman)	7^{7}	6
(United States) Ally Bojczuk (Notre Dame) (United States) Julia Lilien (Notre Dame)	6^{6}	3
5-8	(United States) McCartney Kessler (Florida) (United States) Marlee Zein (Florida)	6	6
(United States) Raven Neely (Louisville) (Slovakia) Tatiana Šimová (Louisville)	1	3
(Colombia) Sofía Múnera (Virginia) (United States) Natasha Subhash (Virginia)	6	4	[12]
(Slovakia) Martina Okáľová (Tulsa) (Italy) Vera Ploner (Tulsa)	3	6	[10]

Second round
1	(Spain) F Arrese (Kentucky) (Lithuania) A Paražinskaitė (Kentucky)	3	2
(United States) E Bolton (UCLA) (United States) J Hart (UCLA)	6	6
5-8	(United States) C Beck (Duke) (Czech Republic) K Beránková (Duke)	7^{7}	4	[7]
(United States) A Rogers (NC State) (United States) A Smith (NC State)	6^{5}	6	[10]
4	(United States) M Jones (North Carolina) (United States) E Scotty (North Carolina)	2	7^{7}	[11]
(United States) J Adams (Furman) (Serbia) K Kozarov (Furman)	6	6^{2}	[9]
5-8	(United States) M Kessler (Florida) (United States) M Zein (Florida)	2	4
(Colombia) S Múnera (Virginia) (United States) N Subhash (Virginia)	6	6

Quarterfinals
(United States) E Bolton (UCLA) (United States) J Hart (UCLA)	6^{4}	3
(United States) A Rogers (NC State) (United States) A Smith (NC State)	7^{7}	6
4	(United States) M Jones (North Carolina) (United States) E Scotty (North Carolina)	6	6
(Colombia) S Múnera (Virginia) (United States) N Subhash (Virginia)	3	3

Semifinals
(United States) A Rogers (NC State) (United States) A Smith (NC State)	3	4
4	(United States) M Jones (North Carolina) (United States) E Scotty (North Carolina)	6	6

==== Bottom half ====
First round
(Ukraine) Diana Khodan (Miami (FL)) (Israel) Maya Tahan (Miami (FL))	1	4
(United States) Jayci Goldsmith (Texas A&M) (Russia) Tatiana Makarova (Texas A&M)	6	6
(United States) Jessica Failla (Pepperdine) (Japan) Shiori Fukuda (Pepperdine)	6^{2}	6^{4}
5-8	(United States) Jaeda Daniel (NC State) (United States) Adriana Reami (NC State)	7^{7}	7^{7}
(Canada) Rosie Johanson (Virginia) (United States) Emma Navarro (Virginia)	4	7^{7}	[10]
(United States) Haley Giavara (California) (New Zealand) Valentina Ivanov (California)	6	6^{2}	[7]
(United States) Carmen Corley (Oklahoma) (United States) Ivana Corley (Oklahoma)	7^{7}	6
3	(United States) Victoria Flores (Georgia Tech) (United States) Kenya Jones (Georgia Tech)	6^{3}	3
(Ukraine) Margaryta Bilokin (Duke) (United States) Meible Chi (Duke)	1	6	[4]
(United States) Carolyn Campana (Wake Forest) (Cyprus) Eliza Omirou (Wake Forest)	6	1	[10]
(India) Nandini Das (Florida St.) (Spain) Andrea García (Florida St.)	6	6
5-8	(Canada) Ariana Arseneault (Georgia) (Serbia) Katarina Jokić (Georgia)	4	4
(United States) Cameron Corse (Notre Dame) (United States) Page Freeman (Notre Dame)	3	2
(United States) Kylie Collins (Texas) (Switzerland) Lulu Sun (Texas)	6	6
(United States) Kolie Allen (Ohio St.) (Canada) Isabelle Boulais (Ohio St.)	5	1
2	(United States) Sara Daavettila (North Carolina) (United States) Cameron Morra (North Carolina)	7	6

Second round
(United States) J Goldsmith (Texas A&M) (Russia) T Makarova (Texas A&M)	6	6
5-8	(United States) J Daniel (NC State) (United States) A Reami (NC State)	2	3
(Canada) R Johanson (Virginia) (United States) E Navarro (Virginia)	6	6
(United States) C Corley (Oklahoma) (United States) I Corley (Oklahoma)	4	3
(United States) C Campana (Wake Forest) (Cyprus) E Omirou (Wake Forest)	4	6^{2}
(India) N Das (Florida St.) (Spain) A García (Florida St.)	6	7^{7}
(United States) K Collins (Texas) (Switzerland) L Sun (Texas)	6	6
2	(United States) S Daavettila (North Carolina) (United States) C Morra (North Carolina)	0	1

Quarterfinals
(United States) J Goldsmith (Texas A&M) (Russia) T Makarova (Texas A&M)	3	1
(Canada) R Johanson (Virginia) (United States) E Navarro (Virginia)	6	6
(India) N Das (Florida St.) (Spain) A García (Florida St.)	3	7^{7}	[5]
(United States) K Collins (Texas) (Switzerland) L Sun (Texas)	6	6^{2}	[10]

Semifinals
(Canada) R Johanson (Virginia) (United States) E Navarro (Virginia)	6	5	[8]
(United States) K Collins (Texas) (Switzerland) L Sun (Texas)	4	7	[10]
