= Athletic scholarship =

Award of educational financial aid for an athlete

An athletic scholarship is a form of scholarship to attend a college or university or a private high school awarded to an individual based predominantly on their ability to play in a sport. Athletic scholarships are common in the United States and to a certain extent in Canada, but in the vast majority of countries in the world they are rare or non-existent.

== United States ==
=== Overview ===
In the United States, athletic scholarships are awarded to student athletes to help cover college costs. There are full-ride scholarships in team sports and individual sports for high performing athletes, but most schools give partial scholarships in the case of individual sports. Even though individual sports have mostly partial scholarships, they still cover a significant amount of the cost of attending college.

Athletic scholarships are largely regulated by the National Collegiate Athletic Association (NCAA). The National Association of Intercollegiate Athletics (NAIA) and National Junior College Athletic Association (NJCAA) are other organizations that also regulate athletic scholarships.

As of 2020, only about 1% to 2% of undergraduate students in bachelor's degree programs were receiving athletic scholarships.

=== Origin of athletic scholarships in the U.S. ===
Prior to the late 19th century, college athletics consisted largely of informal gatherings orchestrated by students. The first college meet ever held was in 1852 when crews from Harvard and Yale raced each other in the sport of rowing, while the first college game ever played took place on November 6, 1869, when Rutgers defeated Princeton 6–4 in football. Following this game, a movement swept across American colleges that increased the number of schools participating in athletics. As the popularity of sports grew, colleges also began to actively recruit individuals, as well as to offer scholarships. As early as the 1870s, both colleges and universities were providing financial support and incentives to athletes.

It was not an uncommon practice at this time for non-students to participate in order to increase the success of a team. In fact, one story tells of a farm boy recruited to play football at the University of Kansas in 1895. As a result of these practices, numerous concerns were raised, including the desire to regulate college athletics. In 1905, the NCAA was created with the intention of "the regulation and supervision of college athletics throughout the United States, in order that the athletic activities in colleges and universities of the United States may be maintained on an ethical plan in keeping with the dignity and high purpose of education."

Right from the start, the NCAA expressed a commitment to preserving both education and amateurism within college athletics. Toward this goal, the NCAA was forced to address student funding, specifically alumni sponsorship. So too was the NCAA forced to address the Southeastern Conference becoming the first conference to legalize athletic scholarships in 1935, a decision widely rebuked at the time. Thus, in 1939 the NCAA delivered a statement which emphasized the amateur status of student-athletes and stated that financial awards would be needs based and independent of the individual's continued athletic participation. Then, in 1950, under the governance of the NCAA, colleges developed the athletic scholarship, as a way to pay prospective student-athletes. As a consequence, prospective students would be awarded financially on the basis of athletic ability. For the next twenty years, there were no limits, as set by the NCAA, on the number of scholarships that an educational institution could award players, as well as no limit on the length of the scholarship term. Moreover, if an athlete withdrew participation from his sport, his scholarship could not be revoked. However, this all changed at the NCAA's annual convention in 1973.

=== Regulation and organization ===
In 1973, the NCAA split its membership into three divisions: Division I, Division II, and Division III. Under NCAA rules, Division I and Division II schools can offer athletic scholarships to student athletes for playing a sport. However, Division III schools do not offer any athletic scholarships. Generally, larger schools compete in Division I and smaller schools in Divisions II and III. Most schools give offers to eligible students in most circumstances.

Division I football is further divided into the Football Bowl Subdivision (FBS, formerly I-A) and Football Championship Subdivision (FCS, formerly I-AA). The two differ in several ways:

- Postseason system: FBS does not have a national championship officially sponsored by the NCAA. The four-team College Football Playoff, which began with the 2014 season, is operated by the commissioners of the FBS conferences. Most of the college football postseason involves bowl games, both inside and outside the CFP structure. FCS uses an NCAA-operated single elimination playoff, which has involved 24 teams since 2013.
- Number of football scholarships: FBS schools are allowed 85 players receiving athletic aid, while FCS schools are allowed 63 scholarships. The wording is a very important distinction for another reason.
- Awarding of partial scholarships: Because each player receiving athletic aid for football counts fully against an FBS team's scholarship limit, this effectively means that all players awarded football scholarships at FBS schools receive full scholarships. On the other hand, FCS schools are allowed to divide their 63 scholarships among no more than 85 individual players.

Some schools or leagues permitted by the NCAA to award athletic scholarships nevertheless prohibit them among their students. An example is the Ivy League, which is part of Division I FCS. The three service academies that participate in Division I FBS football (Army, Navy, and Air Force) are effectively exempt from NCAA scholarship limits because all students at those schools, whether or not they are varsity athletes, receive full scholarships from the service branch that operates the academy.

Institutions that engage in misconduct may be stripped of the ability to award a certain number of athletic scholarships. The ultimate penalty, the suspension of an entire athletic program from participation for a set period of time, is popularly known as the “Death Penalty.” It has only been levied three times against schools now in Division I: against Kentucky basketball in 1952, Southwestern Louisiana (now Louisiana) basketball in 1973, and SMU football in 1986.

In addition to the regulations imposed by the NCAA on the educational institution, the rules governing the provision of athletic scholarship and financial aid are also exhaustive. As noted above, NCAA bylaws place a cap on the number of student-athletes that participate in a given sport at a particular school, who are eligible to receive institutional aid. Institutional aid is defined as the financial aid granted to a student-athlete by the institution in which they are enrolled Financial aid that has not been provided by the school will render the athlete ineligible, unless the aid is received from a guardian or dependent, it has been awarded for reasons separate from the individual's athletic ability, or it has been provided by a recognized and continuing program that may or may not recognize athletic ability as a major criterion (i.e. National Merit Scholarship or as an honorary high school award). There is also a limit to the amount of money that may be awarded through an athletic scholarship. Specifically, it must not exceed the cost of the individual's education otherwise it is considered "pay", which violates an athlete's amateur status.

Academic eligibility, in addition to the other requirements mentioned, has been a longstanding issue in the history of college athletics. In order to respond to the lack of national academic standards, the NCAA passed the 1.600 GPA rule in 1962 in order for freshmen to receive athletic scholarships. However, this decision received widespread criticism and was eventually abolished in 1973. In its wake, the American Council on Education (ACE) presented Proposition 48 to the NCAA conference in 1983. Instead of a minimum 1.600 freshmen GPA, it recommended that for a student to be eligible they must obtain a 2.0 high school GPA, take 11 core high school courses, and score either a 700 on the SAT or a 15 on the ACT. However, just as the 1.600 rule generated controversy, so to did Proposition 48. Joseph B. Johnson, the president of Grambling State University and a representative of the National Association for Equal Opportunity in Higher Education argued that it "[discriminated] against student-athletes from low-income and minority-group families by introducing arbitrary SAT and ACT cut off scores as academic criteria for eligibility." To address this, the NCAA added a partial qualifier to the suggested guidelines. Thus, under the revision, an athlete who met either the 2.0 high school GPA or 700 SAT/15 ACT score would be eligible to receive a scholarship, but would be unable to practice with or play for the team for one academic year. This partial qualifier was subsequently overturned in 1989 following the passage of Prop 42. However, amendments to Prop 42 restored it after much protest. The newest amendment to Proposition 48, Prop 16, was passed in 1992 and later revised in 2008. As of 2008, under Prop 16, a sliding scale for standardized test scores was expanded to allow for a zero score to be allowed in a test, as long as the high school GPA was sufficient to balance it out. Moreover, the number of core high school courses required was increased to 14.

Once a high school senior is deemed eligible to receive an athletic scholarship for their participation on a sports team, they must then follow a number of explicit steps in order to participate at the collegiate level. In particular, the NCAA mandates that they sign a National Letter of Intent (NLI), which is effectively an agreement that binds the student-athlete to institution in which they have chosen to enroll.

Some applicants choose commercial third parties to act as intermediaries which seek out scholarships and facilitate the application process.

=== NCAA bylaws governing Division I athletic scholarships ===
On January 13, 1973, the NCAA revised the scholarship system, and voted to institute a one-year scholarship as opposed to the four-year scholarship already in place. Today, Article 15 of the NCAA Manual Bylaws governs the regulations regarding financial aid grants and athletic scholarships for student athletes. As of 2010, Bylaw 15.3.3.1. for Division I athletic programs differs little from the one-year rule invoked in 1973, as it reads, "If a student's athletics ability is considered in any degree in awarding financial aid, such aid shall neither be awarded for a period in excess of one academic year nor for a period less than one academic year." In addition to the "One-Year Period", the Bylaws also address recommendations made to extend the one-year term, as well as the policies surrounding injury or illness. Specifically, Bylaw 15.3.3.1.3 states that "It is not permissible for an institution to assure the prospective student-athlete that it automatically will continue a grant-in-aid past the one-year period if the recipient sustains an injury that prevents him or her from competing in intercollegiate athletics, but an institutional representative may inform the prospective student-athlete of the regular institutional policy related to renewal or continuation of aid past the one-year period for recipients who become ill or injured during their participation." Moreover, Bylaw 15.3.4 addresses the instances in which an award may be reduced or canceled during the period of the award. According to the NCAA, this applies if a student-athlete becomes ineligible to compete, engages in fraudulent behavior (i.e. provides false information on their application, letter of intent, or financial aid agreement), engages in misconduct that results in disciplinary action, or voluntarily ends participation in the sport. However, the NCAA asserts that the student-athlete must be awarded a hearing before the reduction or cancellation occurs. In addition to the circumstances in which reduction or cancellation of an award is permissible, there are circumstances in which such action cannot be taken during the term period. Specifically, financial aid cannot be withdrawn or reduced during the award period based on athletic ability, performance, or contribution to success. This is true also in the event of injury, illness, or the result of a physical or mental condition.

=== Future directions ===
As a consequence of the complaints voiced and involvement by the Justice Department, in August 2011 the Division I Board of Directors adopted multi-year scholarship legislation to allow Division I schools to provide scholarships for a period greater than one year This legislation was one of many steps the board of directors took after the NCAA President Mark Emmert organized a meeting to discuss issues with the operation of Division I athletics. Voting to override Proposal No 2011-97 (as it was named) was open until Friday, February 17, 2012. By a very narrow margin, the multi-year scholarship legislation was upheld. Of the 330 Division I schools, 62.1% voted in favor of the override, which was just .4% short of the 62.5% majority required to overturn the proposal. Following the outcome, President Mark Emmert was quoted saying, "I am pleased that student-athletes will continue to benefit from the ability of institutions to offer athletics aid for more than one year, but it's clear that there are significant portions of the membership with legitimate concerns. As we continue to examine implementation of the rule, we want to work with the membership to address those concerns." Some opponents worry that multi-year scholarships award wealthy schools an advantage in the recruiting process. Others contend that coaches will be forced to keep players that are not a good fit for their program. Member institutions opposed to the decision will not be forced to offer student-athletes multi-year scholarships. Rather, the decision, provides coaches and universities with the option to extend the scholarship term if they so choose. By spring 2012, a number of sports programs had declared their intent to offer multi-year scholarships including Ohio State, Auburn, Michigan, Michigan State, Florida, and Nebraska.

In June 2014, the Big Ten Conference school presidents endorsed a proposal for four-year guaranteed scholarships that covered the full cost of attendance, although it had not yet moved to implement this proposal. This followed a policy statement by the school presidents of the Pac-12 Conference that stopped just short of endorsing the same.

The first school known to have actually implemented a four-year guarantee was the University of South Carolina, which announced on September 25, 2014, that athletes in football, men's and women's basketball, and women's tennis and volleyball would receive guaranteed scholarships effective immediately. The sports are those classified by the NCAA as "headcount" sports, in which teams can provide financial aid to a specified number of players. The school also said it was working on a way to provide a similar guarantee to those in "equivalency" sports—those in which the NCAA limits teams to providing aid equivalent to a set number of scholarships, with that number being lower than the size of a full playing squad. The following month, the Pac-12 presidents passed a change to conference rules that instituted four-year guaranteed scholarships (full or partial) in all conference sports.

In February 2012 John Kavanagh, then a member of the Arizona House of Representatives, introduced bill HB 2675, which would have required students attending a public university in the state of Arizona (Arizona State University, University of Arizona, or Northern Arizona University) to pay an additional $2,000 fee in order to attend one of the three universities. The bill also stated that students should pay this fee from their own means, meaning that no federal or state grants would cover this fee. Only students on full-ride academic or athletic scholarships would have been exempt from this fee. The bill had been scheduled for a vote by the full House, but was then withdrawn by the legislator who had originally introduced it.

== Other countries ==
In other countries athletic scholarships are far more restricted.

=== Canada ===
Canadian schools offer athletic scholarship money for their athletes under certain criteria.

- Tuition and compulsory fees is the maximum amount an athlete can receive for athletic-related awards in an academic year, including athletic-related bursaries.
- The value and quantity of athletic-related awards and bursaries available varies from institution to institution.
- Specific awards and bursaries may have additional conditions, such as academic success and citizenship
- Many awards, such as academic awards or awards provided by Sport Governing Bodies or the Federal and Provincial Governments, are not included within the tuition and compulsory fees maximum
- The athlete is eligible to receive an award or bursary at the beginning of their first year (September) at a university if they have a minimum entering average of 80% or equivalent. Alternatively, the athlete is eligible to receive an award at the end of their first year at a university (spring or summer) if they satisfy U Sports academic requirements with at least a 65% average or equivalent. Thereafter, the athlete is eligible to receive an award at the beginning of any year if they satisfy U Sports academic requirements with at least a 65% average or equivalent in the preceding year.

Many Canadian student/athletes decide to go to NCAA Division 1 programs based on the illusion that they are receiving a better deal from these schools with regards to finances and athletics. A typical Canadian university program could cost between $5,000-$6,000 Canadian per year, where as an NCAA school charges between $25,000 to $40,000 US to attend their programs. Compounding this is the cost of travel to and from the university for both student and family and the associated costs of living away from home. Based on the information above, Canadian schools have less tuition to cover and also do not have to include substantial federal/provincial scholarships and academic scholarships in their scholarship declarations.

While the competitive standard for some sports may be higher in some Division I (and sometimes Division II) schools, this does vary. In general, this difference would not materialize until the play-off portion of the season, where the standard is much higher overall than the general standard of NCAA competition.

The academic standard for athletes is lower in United States and leaves many Canadian students returning to Canada having to take extra courses and in some cases, extra years of study in order to have their academic qualifications recognized.

U Sports schools are also not bound by the tight NCAA rules surrounding contacts with athletes and in reality, means that U Sports coaches have the potential to develop their athletes to a higher standard, while also maintaining higher academics due to the above-mentioned differences in academic standards.

=== United Kingdom ===
In the United Kingdom entrance scholarships based on sporting ability are not traditional, though contrary to popular belief they are not actually banned. Sporting ability may be taken into account in admission for places on degrees in subjects such as sports science, and at the discretion of admissions staff sporting achievements may be taken into account on choosing candidates based on their ability to make an all round contribution to the institution in the same way as achievements in any other non-academic area. Students who are elite standard sports competitors are eligible for financial support from bodies such as UK Sport on the same basis as anyone else. Certain universities have a strong emphasis on sport, including Loughborough University, University of Bath, Durham University and Richmond American University London each of which hosts a number of nationally funded training facilities. Some universities may make bursaries available to top student athletes, though these are generally not large. Some British students take athletic scholarships at American universities, a trend which is particularly noticeable in golf. Many top British golfers are graduates of American universities including Colin Montgomerie, Luke Donald and Paul Casey.

=== New Zealand ===
Some secondary schools in New Zealand, mainly private ones, offer entrance scholarships based on sporting ability. However, these have been restricted in recent years by the New Zealand Secondary School Sports Council's (NZSSSC) anti-poaching rules.

The NZSSSC introduced a quota system in 2007 on the number of new-to-school and international students a school can field at national championships. Some regional secondary school sporting bodies have also enacted the NZSSSC's rules to first teams in local competitions. A new-to-school student is a student who has enrolled at the school in the 24 months prior to the event, excluding students who enrolled at the school in Year 9 (the first year/grade of secondary school) or below. An international student is a student who is not a New Zealand citizen, Australian citizen, or the holder of a New Zealand residence class visa or domestic-endorsed student visa. The quota depends on the sport, for example, rugby union teams (15-a-side) are only allowed six new-to-school and international students, and only two of those six students may be international students.

In addition to the quota system, schools are not permitted to induce a student to change schools for sporting purposes, other than by way of a publicly advertised sporting scholarship. The penalties for breaking either rule is loss of competition points and/or disqualification of the athletes, teams, coaches and/or managers involved.
