= Peter Ayers =

American tennis coach (born 1973)

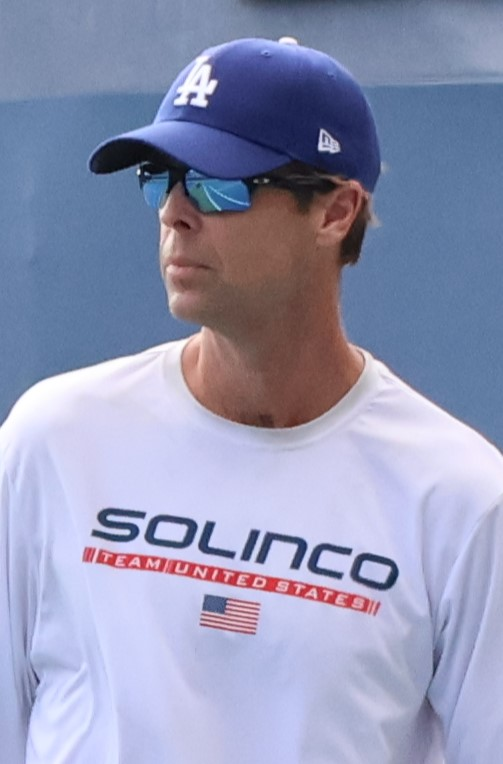
- Ayers in 2024
- Country (sports): United States
- Born: 1973 (age 52–53)
- Height: 6 ft 2 in (188 cm)
- Plays: Left-handed
- College: Duke (1993–1996)

Singles
- Highest ranking: No. 922 (July 7, 1997)

Doubles
- Highest ranking: No. 755 (May 5, 1997)

Coaching career
- Emma Navarro

Coaching achievements
- Coachee singles titles total: 1

Peter Ayers (born 1973) is an American tennis coach and former player. He played college tennis for the Duke Blue Devils. He currently coaches Emma Navarro.

== Playing career ==
Ayers grew up in Charlotte, North Carolina, and began playing tennis at age eight. He won gold at the U.S. Olympic Festival in 1991 and competed in the boys' singles and doubles events at the 1991 US Open. He attended Myers Park High School in Charlotte, where he played high school basketball.

Ayers played college tennis at Duke University from 1993 to 1996, winning Atlantic Coast Conference (ACC) championships with the team all four years. He went 103–54 in singles over his college career and was named All-ACC in 1993 and 1994. He went 98–50 in doubles, including a 75–40 record partnering Rob Chess, and was named All-American in doubles in 1995.

Ayers reached career-high Association of Tennis Professionals (ATP) rankings of No. 922 in singles and No. 755 in doubles, both achieved in 1997.

== Coaching career ==
Ayers has coached Emma Navarro for more than a decade since she was 14 years old, beginning as an instructor at the LTP Tennis Academy in Charleston, South Carolina, owned by Navarro's father Ben. He continued working with her while she was in college at the University of Virginia, where she won the NCAA championship in singles in 2021.

Personal Life

Ayers and his wife, novelist Kristen Ness, met in college at Duke and married in 2001. They have two children, Taylor and Dylan.
