= Scotty (surname) =

Scotty is a surname. Notable people with the surname include:

- Charmaine Scotty (fl. from 2013), Nauruan politician
- Elizabeth Scotty (born 2001), American tennis player
- Ludwig Scotty (1948–2026), Nauruan politician
