= Elizabeth Scotty =

American tennis player (born 2001)

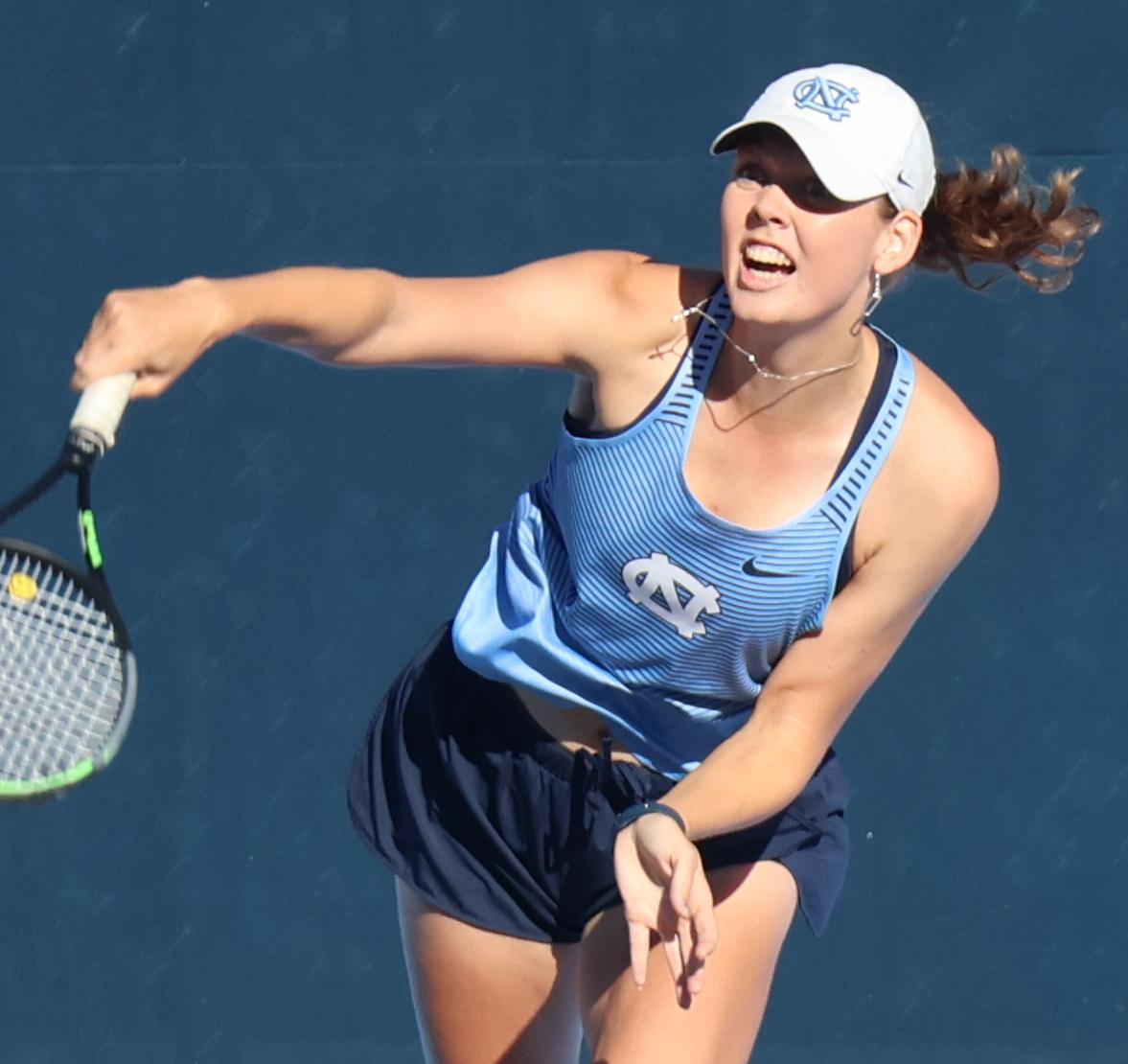
- Scotty at the 2023 Kitty Harrison Invitational
- Country (sports): United States
- Born: July 12, 2001 (age 24) Annapolis, Maryland, U.S.
- Height: 6 ft 1 in (185 cm)
- Plays: Right-handed (two-handed backhand)
- College: North Carolina (2020–2024)
- Prize money: US$ 14,784

Singles
- Career record: 29–24
- Highest ranking: No. 1,239 (September 12, 2016)

Doubles
- Career record: 0–2

Grand Slam doubles results
- US Open: 1R (2021)
- Last updated on: August 2, 2021.

Elizabeth Scotty (born July 12, 2001) is an American tennis player. She played college tennis for the North Carolina Tar Heels, with which she won the 2023 NCAA team championship. She won three national doubles titles: at the NCAA championship with Makenna Jones in 2021 and at the ITA National Fall Championships with Fiona Crawley in 2021 and Reese Brantmeier in 2023.

== Early life and junior career ==
Scotty was raised in Annapolis, Maryland. She began playing on the International Tennis Federation (ITF) Women's World Tennis Tour in 2015. She has a career-high Women's Tennis Association (WTA) singles ranking of No. 1,239 achieved on September 12, 2016. She signed a letter of intent to the University of North Carolina at Chapel Hill in late 2019.

== College career ==
Scotty began playing college tennis at North Carolina in the spring of 2020. As a freshman, she went undefeated in nine dual match singles matches and had 13 wins and 3 losses in doubles partnering sophomore Cameron Morra.

Scotty went 19–4 in singles in the 2020–21 season and partnered with senior Makenna Jones to win 18 of 20 matches. She helped North Carolina earn the top seed at the 2021 NCAA Championships, where they reached the semifinals. Fourth-seeded Scotty and Jones won the doubles title at the NCAA tournament, becoming the second pair of Tar Heels to do so; they finished the year ranked No. 1 nationally. In August 2021, Scotty made her WTA Tour main draw debut at the 2021 Silicon Valley Classic, where she and Jones received a wildcard into the doubles main draw. They also received a wildcard for the 2021 US Open.

Scotty began partnering Fiona Crawley in the fall of 2021. In their first ten matches together, they won the doubles titles at the Intercollegiate Tennis Association (ITA) Carolina Regionals and the ITA Fall National Championships in San Diego. They finished the 2021–22 regular season with 25 wins and 9 losses and ranked No. 2 nationally; Scotty ranked No. 20 in singles with a 20–6 record. North Carolina again had the top seed at the NCAA Championships but lost in the semifinals; Scotty reached the round of 16 in singles and doubles.

North Carolina went undefeated in the 2022–23 regular season. Scotty helped North Carolina win their first national team title at the 2023 NCAA Championships, beating Abigail Rencheli in a long two-set singles match in the final against NC State. She additionally reached the NCAA doubles final with Reese Brantmeier, but they lost to North Carolina teammates Crawley and Tanguilig.

Scotty returned to North Carolina for a fifth year in the fall of 2023. Top seeds Scotty and Brantmeier won the ITA Fall National Championships without dropping a set.
