= Emma Navarro =

American tennis player (born 2001)

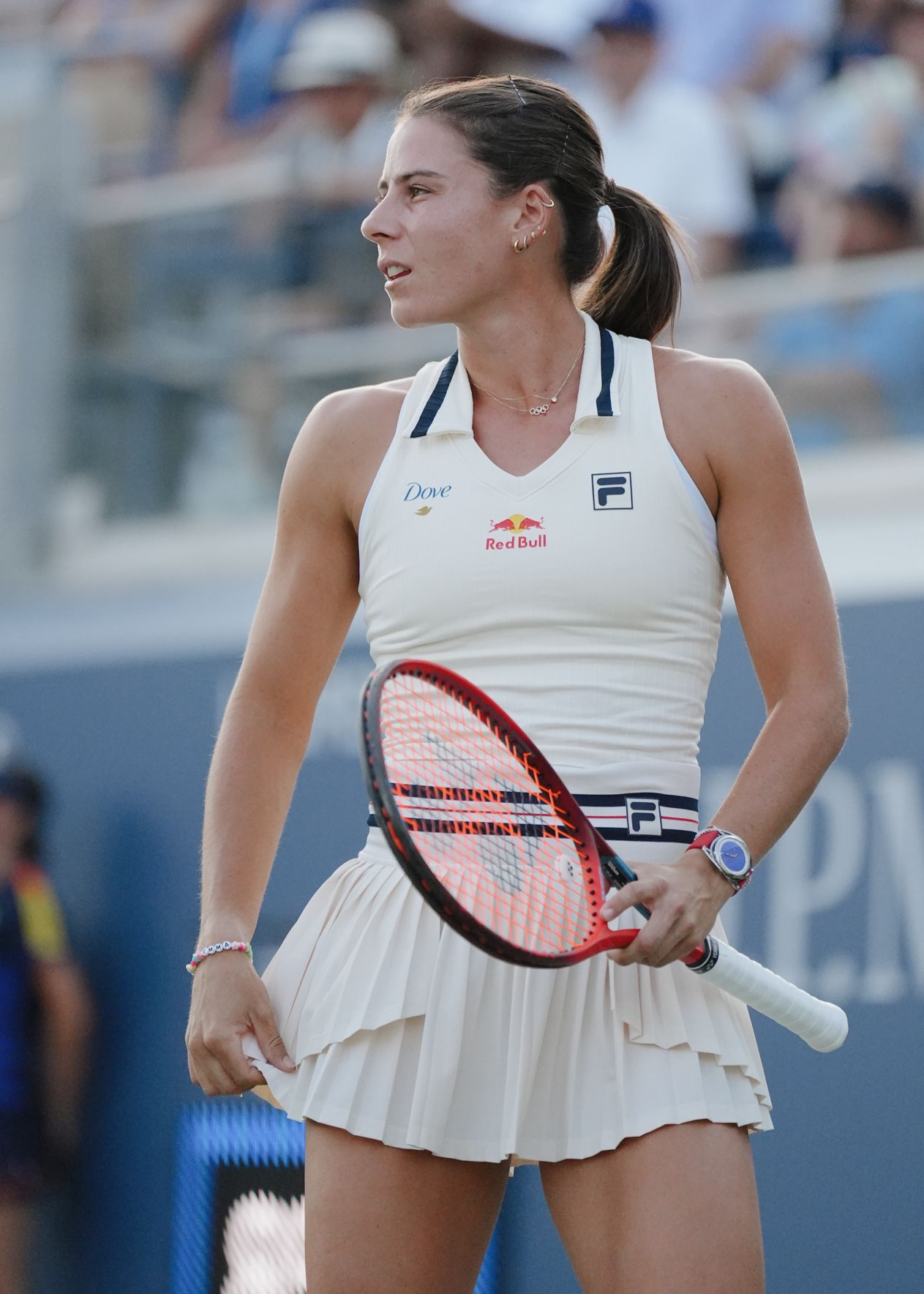
- Emma Navarro at 2024 US Open
- Country (sports): United States
- Residence: Charleston, South Carolina, US
- Born: May 18, 2001 (age 25) New York City, US
- Height: 5 ft 7 in (170 cm)
- Turned pro: 2015
- Plays: Right-handed (two-handed backhand)
- College: Virginia (2020–2022)
- Coach: Peter Ayers
- Prize money: US$ 7,459,094

Singles
- Career record: 261–158
- Career titles: 3
- Highest ranking: No. 8 (September 9, 2024)
- Current ranking: No. 28 (November 2, 2026)

Grand Slam singles results
- Australian Open: QF (2025)
- French Open: 4R (2024)
- Wimbledon: QF (2024)
- US Open: SF (2024)

Other tournaments
- Olympic Games: 3R (2024)

Doubles
- Career record: 28–38
- Career titles: 0
- Highest ranking: No. 93 (August 12, 2024)
- Current ranking: No. 1,613 (November 2, 2026)

Grand Slam doubles results
- Australian Open: 3R (2024)
- French Open: QF (2024)
- Wimbledon: 2R (2024)
- US Open: 1R (2019, 2021, 2023)

Grand Slam mixed doubles results
- US Open: QF (2026)

Team competitions
- Fed Cup: 3–1
- Last updated on: November 2, 2026.

Emma Navarro (born May 18, 2001) is an American professional tennis player. She has a career-high singles ranking of No. 8 by the WTA and a best in doubles of No. 93, achieved in 2024. Navarro has won three singles titles on the WTA Tour, and reached a major semifinal at the 2024 US Open.

Navarro played college tennis at the University of Virginia and won the NCAA Singles Championship in 2021. She won her first WTA Tour title at the 2024 Hobart International. In 2025, she was part of the United States squad that reached the Billie Jean King Cup final.

== Career ==
=== 2019: WTA Tour debut ===
Navarro finished as the runner-up in the French Open girls' singles, (Note: To obtain data from this reference, select the corresponding year on the WTA or ITF website.) and won the girls' doubles playing with Chloe Beck. They also finished as runners-up in the Australian Open girls' doubles.

Navarro made her WTA Tour main-draw debut at the 2019 Charleston Open in South Carolina, after receiving a wildcard for the singles and doubles events.

=== 2020–2022: Major debut, NCAA champion ===
Navarro was rated as the best tennis recruit in the nation and joined the Virginia Cavaliers in the fall of 2020 after having previously committed to Duke University in Durham, North Carolina. For her freshman year, she went 25–1 in singles and reached the No. 1 ranking in the country. She avenged her only loss of the season in the final of the 2021 NCAA singles championship, beating defending champion Estela Perez-Somarriba of the University of Miami. Navarro made it to the NCAA doubles semifinals partnering with Rosie Johanson. Navarro was named the ITA Rookie of the Year and was a finalist for the Honda Sports Award. With her NCAA win, she earned a wildcard into the 2021 US Open main draw where she made her Grand Slam main-draw debut.

Navarro went 26–2 in singles for her second-year, ending the year ranked No. 2 nationally, after losing to Abigail Rencheli of NC State in the round of 16 of the 2022 NCAA singles championship. She was again an All-American in singles and doubles and was a finalist for the Honda Sports Award. She left Virginia after her second season.

=== 2023: First major win, top 40 ===
For her debut at the French Open as a wildcard, Navarro reached the second round, defeating Erika Andreeva for her first win at a major. Navarro reached a WTA Tour semifinal for the first time in her career at the 2023 Bad Homburg Open in Bad Homburg, Germany as an alternate defeating Alizé Cornet and then Rebeka Masarova by retirement.

Navarro was runner-up at the Swedish Open losing the final to Olga Danilović, in three sets. She reached the top 50 at No. 49, following a first-round showing at the US Open, and another semifinal at the San Diego Open on September 18. She became the third American to crack the top 50 in 2023, joining Alycia Parks and Peyton Stearns.

Navarro finished the season ranked No. 38 in singles, her highest year-end in her career.

=== 2024: First title, world No. 8, awards ===
She reached a third semifinal at the Auckland Open defeating seventh seed Petra Martić in straight sets, and another back-to-back semifinal at the Hobart International, defeating Viktoriya Tomova in three sets. Navarro defeated Chinese qualifier Yuan Yue and reached her first WTA Tour final on her debut at the tournament. Navarro won her maiden title defeating former two-time Hobart champion Elise Mertens.

Seeded for the first time at the Australian Open as No. 27, Navarro defeated Wang Xiyu and Elisabetta Cocciaretto to reach the third round of a major for the first time in her career. As a result, Navarro reached the top 25 in the singles rankings at No. 23, on January 29, 2024. Seeded third at the San Diego Open, she reached the semifinals defeating Katerina Siniaková and qualifier Daria Saville. Seeded 23rd at the Indian Wells Open in California, Navarro advanced to the fourth round with wins over Ukrainians Lesia Tsurenko and 16th seed Elina Svitolina. Navarro reached her first WTA 1000 quarterfinal by defeating world No. 2 and previous year runner-up, Aryna Sabalenka, her biggest win by ranking in her career. Navarro became the first American to defeat a top-2 opponent at the tournament since Serena Williams did so in 2001 against Lindsay Davenport in the quarterfinals. As a result, Navarro broke into the top 20 in the singles rankings.

Seeded 20th at the next WTA 1000, the Miami Open, she reached the fourth round by defeating qualifier Storm Hunter and 12th seed Jasmine Paolini, before losing to Jessica Pegula in three sets. Navarro reached the fourth round of a major for the first time at the 2024 French Open with a win over 14th seed Madison Keys, in two sets. She eventually lost to second seed Aryna Sabalenka moving her to a new career-high of No. 17 in the world, on June 10, 2024. At Wimbledon, Navarro reached her first major quarterfinal with wins over Wang Qiang, Naomi Osaka, Diana Shnaider, and world No. 2, Coco Gauff before losing to world No. 7 and eventual finalist, Jasmine Paolini. Due to her run, Navarro reached the top 15 in the singles rankings on July 15, 2024.

In Paris, she made her Olympics debut and advanced to the third round, losing there to eventual gold medalist, Zheng Qinwen.

Seeded No. 8 at the Canadian Open, Navarro defeated Magda Linette, 11th seed Marta Kostyuk, and lucky loser Taylor Townsend to reach her first WTA 1000 semifinal. Navarro followed that with reaching another semifinal at the newly upgraded WTA 500 Monterrey Open in Mexico with a win over Camila Osorio and ninth seed Magdalena Fręch. As a result, Navarro reached a new career-high of No. 12 in the world, on August 26, 2024. Seeded 13th at the US Open and seeded for the first time at this major, she reached the third round with wins over Anna Blinkova, in less than an hour, and Arantxa Rus. She reached the fourth round in a third major in 2024, with a win over 19th seed Marta Kostyuk. Again Navarro upset defending champion and third seed, Gauff, to reach her second major quarterfinal in a row. Navarro advanced to her first major semifinal with a straight-sets victory over Paula Badosa, subsequently rising to a career-high singles ranking of world No. 8. She lost to second seed Aryna Sabalenka in straight sets.

Although she was No. 8 in the world, Navarro missed out on a place at the WTA Finals in Riyadh, Saudi Arabia due to Wimbledon champion Barbora Krejčíková receiving entry because of a WTA rule which gives a spot to a major winner if they finish in the top 20. Navarro turned down a place as an alternate with her agent saying that she had not yet recovered from a recent illness.

In December, Navarro was named the Most Improved Player of the Year by the WTA.

=== 2025: Second WTA Tour title ===
Seeded second at the Adelaide International, Navarro lost in the quarterfinals to Liudmila Samsonova in three sets. She also made the quarterfinals at the Australian Open for the first time, at which point her run was ended by second seed Iga Świątek.

As top seed at the Mérida Open, Navarro won her second WTA Tour title, double bagelling qualifier Emiliana Arango in the final.

During the clay-court season, she made it through to the quarterfinals at the Charleston Open and Strasbourg Open, losing to Amanda Anisimova and Beatriz Haddad Maia respectively.

Moving to the grass-courts, Navarro reached the quarterfinals at the Queen's Club Championships, where she was eliminated by Amanda Anisimova, and two weeks later at the Bad Homburg Open, where it was top seed and eventual champion, Jessica Pegula, who defeated her.

She lost in the first round in four of her last seven events in 2025, with the only bright spot being a run to the quarterfinals at the China Open that included a win over world No. 2, Iga Świątek, but which ultimately ended in a three-set defeat to fifth seed Jessica Pegula.

=== 2026: Illness lay-off, third career title, 100th win ===
Navarro at the 2026 Cincinnati Open

In January, Navarro reached the quarterfinals at the Adelaide International, where she lost to Diana Shnaider. Having lost nine of her first 13 matches of the year, she withdrew from the Charleston Open at the end of March citing "health struggles" which had been affecting her "over the past year" — later revealed to be hypothyroidism — and was away from the Tour until returning at the Italian Open in May. After receiving a bye as 28th seed, Navarro lost to Elisabetta Cocciaretto in the second round.

Dropping down to WTA 125 level, she entered the Trophée Clarins in Paris, but lost to Katie Volynets in the second round. The following week at the Strasbourg Open, Navarro defeated Sára Bejlek and third seed Iva Jovic for her 100th WTA Tour win. She then overcame lucky loser Zhang Shuai and Ann Li to reach the final. In the championship match Navarro defeated top seed Victoria Mboko in three sets to claim her third career title, her second at the WTA 500-level and first on clay courts. At the French Open, she defeated Janice Tjen, before losing to 17th seed Iva Jovic in the second round.

Seeded third at the Nottingham Open, Navarro recorded wins over qualifier Anna Bondár, Yuliia StarodubtsevaJéssica Bouzas Maneiro and Viktorija Golubic to reach her first WTA Tour grass-court final, which she lost to fourth seed Marie Bouzková. The next week at the Bad Homburg Open, she defeated wildcard entrant Eva Lys and world No. 3 Iga Świątek on her way to the quarterfinals, where she was eliminated by qualifier Elena-Gabriela Ruse. At Wimbledon, Navarro recorded come from behind three sets wins over Paula Badosa and Oksana Selekhmeteva, before losing to 12th seed Marta Kostyuk in the third round, also in three sets.

In September at the US Open, she defeated Loïs Boisson, Caty McNally, seventh seed Karolína Muchová and 21st seed Anna Kalinskaya to reach the quarterfinals, where her run was ended by third seed Jessica Pegula. On September 30, Navarro announced she was ending her season early to focus on her health.

== Personal life ==
Emma Navarro is the daughter of billionaire businessman Ben Navarro, and the granddaughter of Frank Navarro, a former American football player and coach. Ben Navarro has significantly contributed to the tennis world through his company, Beemok Capital. This includes acquiring and investing in professional tournaments, such as the Charleston Open (since 2018) and Cincinnati Open (since 2022), where Emma has competed. He also funded a major renovation of the Credit One Stadium in Charleston. Navarro is of Italian descent.

Navarro attended Ashley Hall, an all-girls private school in downtown Charleston, where she played on the varsity tennis team. She is good friends with fellow American tennis player Danielle Collins whom she views as a role model.

In 2025, Navarro was diagnosed with Hashimoto's thyroiditis and relative energy deficiency in sport (RED-S).

== Career statistics ==
=== Grand Slam tournament performance timelines ===
Key
| W | F | SF | QF | #R | RR | Q# | DNQ | A | NH |

(W) winner; (F) finalist; (SF) semifinalist; (QF) quarterfinalist; (#R) rounds 4, 3, 2, 1; (RR) round-robin stage; (Q#) qualification round; (DNQ) did not qualify; (A) absent; (NH) not held; (SR) strike rate (events won / competed); (W–L) win–loss record.
To avoid confusion and double counting, these charts are updated at the conclusion of a tournament or when the player's participation has ended.

==== Singles ====
| Tournament | 2019 | 2020 | 2021 | 2022 | 2023 | 2024 | 2025 | 2026 | SR | W–L | Win% |
|---|---|---|---|---|---|---|---|---|---|---|---|
| Australian Open | A | A | A | A | A | 3R | QF | 1R | 0 / 3 | 6–3 | 67% |
| French Open | A | A | A | A | 2R | 4R | 1R | 2R | 0 / 4 | 5–4 | 56% |
| Wimbledon | A | NH | A | A | 1R | QF | 4R | 3R | 0 / 4 | 9–4 | 69% |
| US Open | Q1 | A | 1R | A | 1R | SF | 3R | QF | 0 / 5 | 11–5 | 69% |
| Win–Loss | 0–0 | 0–0 | 0–1 | 0–0 | 1–3 | 14–4 | 9–4 | 7–4 | 0 / 16 | 31–16 | 63% |

== Awards ==
2024

- WTA Most Improved Player
