= NCAA Women's Tennis Championship =

American collegiate tennis tournament

The NCAA Women's Tennis Championship refers to one of three annual collegiate tennis competitions for women organized by the National Collegiate Athletic Association for athletes from institutions that make up its three divisions: Division I, II, and III. At each level, the NCAA awards a team championship, a singles championship, and a doubles championship..

- NCAA Division I Women's Tennis Championship
- NCAA Women's Division II Tennis Championship
- NCAA Women's Division III Tennis Championship

== See also ==
- AIAW Intercollegiate Women's Tennis Champions
- NCAA Men's Tennis Championship
