= South Carolina Gamecocks women's tennis =

South Carolina Gamecocks
- Founded: 1974
- University: University of South Carolina
- Athletic director: Jeremiah Donati
- Head coach: Kevin Epley (14th season)
- Conference: SEC
- Location: Columbia, South Carolina, US
- Home Court: Carolina Tennis Center
- Nickname: Gamecocks
- Colors: Garnet and black

NCAA Tournament Quarterfinals
- 1982, 2009, 2019

NCAA Tournament Round of 16
- 1982, 1983, 1990, 1995, 1999, 2009, 2017, 2018, 2019

NCAA Tournament Round of 32
- 1990, 1995, 1996, 1997, 1998, 1999, 2000, 2001, 2002, 2003, 2004, 2005, 2008, 2009, 2010, 2011, 2012, 2014, 2015, 2016, 2017, 2018, 2019, 2022, 2025, 2026

NCAA Tournament appearances
- 1982, 1983, 1988, 1990, 1995, 1996, 1997, 1998, 1999, 2000, 2001, 2002, 2003, 2004, 2005, 2006, 2007, 2008, 2009, 2010, 2011, 2012, 2013, 2014, 2015, 2016, 2017, 2018, 2019, 2021, 2022, 2023, 2024, 2025, 2026

Conference Tournament championships
- Metro Conference: 1985, 1986, 1987, 1988, 1990; SEC: 2019

The South Carolina Gamecocks women's tennis team represents the University of South Carolina and competes in the Southeastern Conference. The team has been coached by Kevin Epley since 2012.

== Head coaches ==
Name	Years	Seasons	Won	Lost	Pct.
Kitty Parrot	1974	1	10	8	.556
Frankie Porter	1975	1	14	4	.778
Kathy Graham	1976–1977	2	26	7	.788
Jeff Kefalos	1978–1983	6	129	34	.791
Arlo Elkins	1984–2012	29	447	299	.599
Kevin Epley	2013–present	14	219	130	.625
All-Time		53	845	482	.636

== Year-by-Year Results ==
Season	Coach	Record		Notes
Season	Coach	Overall	Conference	Notes
Independent
1974	Kitty Parrot	10–8	—	
1975	Frankie Porter	14–4	—	
1976	Kathy Graham	11–3	—	
1977	Kathy Graham	15–4	—	
1978	Jeff Kefalos	12–7	—	AIAW Regionals
1979	Jeff Kefalos	26–5	—	AIAW Nationals
1980	Jeff Kefalos	22–2	—	AIAW Nationals
1981	Jeff Kefalos	19–12	—	AIAW Regionals
1982	Jeff Kefalos	28–3	—	NCAA Second Round
1983	Jeff Kefalos	22–5	—	NCAA First Round
Metro Conference
1984	Arlo Elkins	12–17	—	
1985	Arlo Elkins	27–10	—	Metro Tournament Champions
1986	Arlo Elkins	13–16	—	Metro Tournament Champions
1987	Arlo Elkins	24–8	—	Metro Tournament Champions
1988	Arlo Elkins	15–10	—	Metro Tournament Champions; NCAA First Round
1989	Arlo Elkins	7–16	—	
1990	Arlo Elkins	18–6	—	Metro Tournament Champions; NCAA Second Round
1991	Arlo Elkins	9–13	—	
Southeastern Conference
1992	Arlo Elkins	13–10	6–5	
1993	Arlo Elkins	10–12	5–6	
1994	Arlo Elkins	19–7	6–5	
1995	Arlo Elkins	22–7	7–4	NCAA Second Round
1996	Arlo Elkins	17–10	9–2	NCAA Second Round
1997	Arlo Elkins	15–10	5–6	NCAA Third Round
1998	Arlo Elkins	12–12	5–6	NCAA Second Round
1999	Arlo Elkins	18–8	6–5	NCAA Sweet 16
2000	Arlo Elkins	16–12	6–5	NCAA Second Round
2001	Arlo Elkins	15–9	7–4	NCAA Second Round
2002	Arlo Elkins	17–8	7–4	NCAA Second Round
2003	Arlo Elkins	14–11	5–6	NCAA Second Round
2004	Arlo Elkins	14–10	5–6	NCAA Second Round
2005	Arlo Elkins	15–9	6–5	NCAA Second Round
2006	Arlo Elkins	12–11	4–7	NCAA First Round
2007	Arlo Elkins	16–7	8–3	NCAA First Round
2008	Arlo Elkins	13–10	5–6	NCAA Second Round
2009	Arlo Elkins	17–11	6–5	NCAA Elite Eight
2010	Arlo Elkins	17–9	7–4	NCAA Second Round
2011	Arlo Elkins	14–11	4–7	NCAA Second Round
2012	Arlo Elkins	16–9	5–6	NCAA Second Round
2013	Kevin Epley	13–12	6–7	NCAA First Round
2014	Kevin Epley	17–11	6–7	NCAA Second Round
2015	Kevin Epley	15–11	6–7	NCAA Second Round
2016	Kevin Epley	19-8	9-4	NCAA Second Round
2017	Kevin Epley	20-9	8-5	NCAA Sweet 16
2018	Kevin Epley	21-7	11-2	NCAA Sweet 16
2019	Kevin Epley	23-4	12-1	NCAA Elite 8
2020	Kevin Epley	8-4	4-0	NCAA Tournament Cancelled
2021	Kevin Epley	12-12	7-6	NCAA First Round
2022	Kevin Epley	15-11	8-5	NCAA Second Round
2023	Kevin Epley	13-11	8-5	NCAA First Round
2024	Kevin Epley	17-8	8-5	NCAA First Round
2025	Kevin Epley	15-12	8-7	NCAA Second Round
2026	Kevin Epley	13-13	5-10	NCAA Second Round
Total	South Carolina	847-485	230-179	34 NCAA Women's Tennis Championship appearance
