= VCU Rams women's tennis =

- University: Virginia Commonwealth University
- Head coach: Vivian Segnini (1st season)
- Conference: CAA
- Location: Richmond, VA
- Home Court: Thalhimer Tennis Center (Capacity: 300)
- Nickname: VCU Rams
- Colors: Black and gold

NCAA Tournament appearances
- 1998, 2000, 2001, 2002, 2003, 2006, 2007, 2008, 2009, 2010, 2011, 2012, 2016

Conference Tournament championships
- 2003, 2006, 2010, 2012

VCU Rams women's tennis represents Virginia Commonwealth University. The team is coached by Vivian Segnini.

== Facilities ==
=== Thalhimer Tennis Center ===
The six court facility currently holds 300 people, and is located between Main and Cary Street in VCU's Monroe Park Campus.

=== New Tennis Center ===
The 2014-2020 six year capital plan calls for a 14 million dollar, state-of-the-art, modern Tennis center that will include 6 indoor courts, a spectator viewing space, and 12 outdoor courts.

== VCU Rams All-Americans ==
Martina Nedelková (1998, 2001) Andrea Ondrisova (2000, 2002) Barbora Zahnova (2003) Silvia Urickova (2003) Marianna Yuferova (2005) Olga Borisova (2005) Tatsiana Uvarova (2006)
