= Cameron Morra =

American tennis player

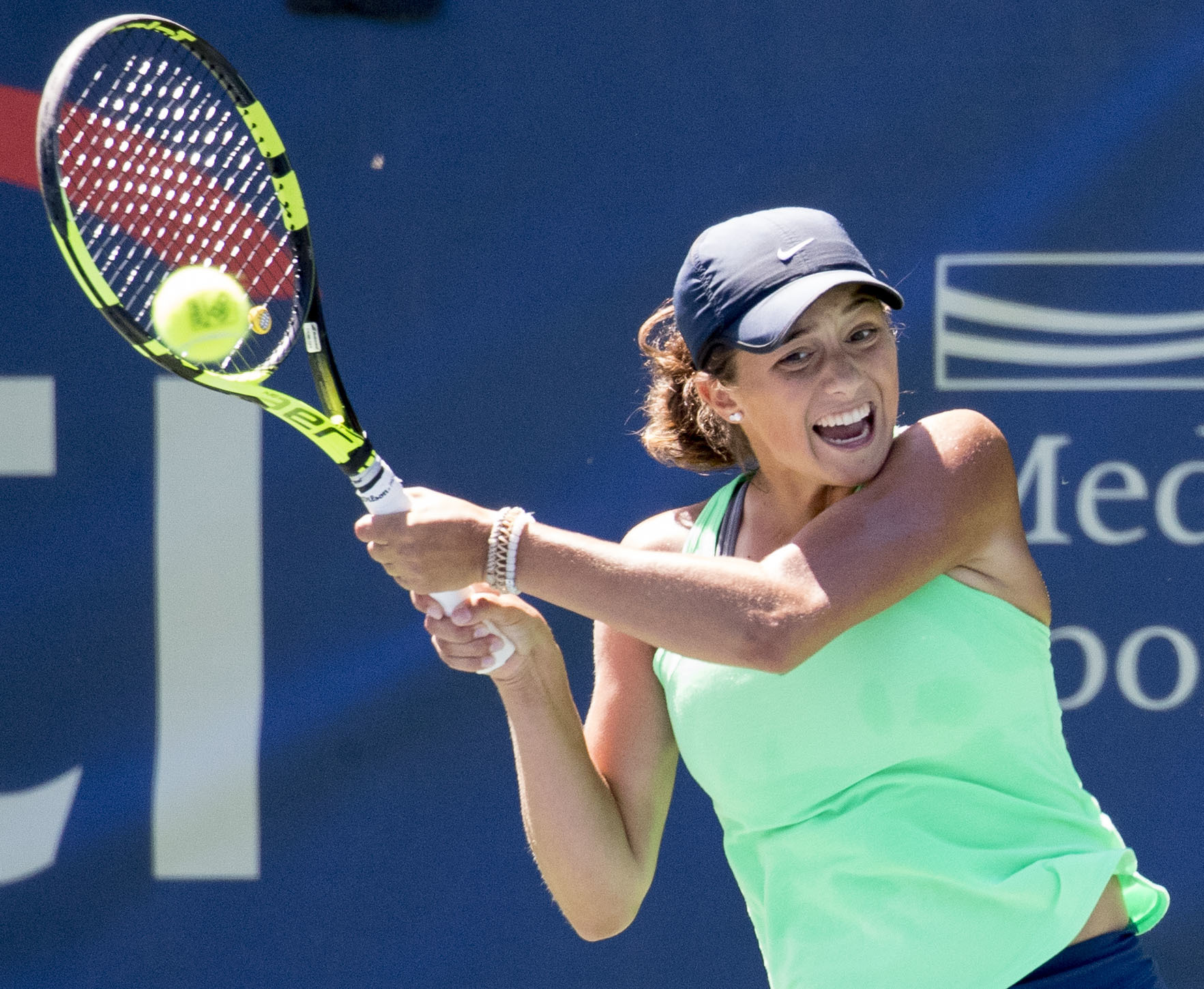
- Country (sports): United States
- Born: September 20, 1999 (age 25)
- Height: 5 ft 10 in (1.78 m)
- Plays: Right-handed (two-handed both sides)
- College: University of North Carolina
- Prize money: US$4,605

Singles
- Career record: 17–37
- Career titles: 0
- Highest ranking: No. 1008 (July 30, 2018)

Doubles
- Career record: 6–7
- Career titles: 0
- Highest ranking: No. 868 (August 7, 2017)
- Last updated on: July 29, 2019.

Cameron Morra (born September 20, 1999) is an American tennis player. Morra has reached a career-high WTA ranking of 1008 in singles and 868 in doubles. She made her main draw debut at the 2019 Citi Open partnering with Alana Smith in doubles.

== Personal life and early life ==
Cameron's parents are David and Elizabeth Morra. She has a younger sister named Sloane. Growing up, Morra did not play in many junior events or receive much outside coaching due to the extensive travel, costs, and stress of being on the junior circuit. Instead, she would almost entirely practice on a tennis court built in her backyard with her father coaching her. Despite her limited time and exposure on the junior circuit, Morra has played in ITF pro circuit events since she was 14. On November 13, 2017, she signed a national letter of intent to play collegiate tennis at the University of North Carolina.

== Amateur career ==
During her freshman year at UNC, Morra primarily played at No. 4 singles and No. 2 doubles, with records of 31–8 and 24–5 respectively. She helped the Tar Heels win the ACC Tournament and was named the tournament MVP. Morra reached the semifinals of the 2019 NCAA Singles Tournament, becoming the first UNC freshman to do so, and the quarterfinals of the doubles tournament, teaming up with Makenna Jones. For her play during the season, Morra was named second team All-ACC, ACC Freshman of the Year, and ITA All-American in both singles and doubles.
