= 1989 US Open – Women's singles qualifying =

Women's singles qualifying
- 1989 US Open

Events
Singles	men	women		boys	girls
Doubles	men	women	mixed	boys	girls
WC Singles	men	women	quad
WC Doubles	men	women	quad
Legends	men	women	mixed

Qualification
Singles	men	women
- US Open

Players who neither had high enough rankings nor received wild cards to enter the main draw of the annual US Open Tennis Championships participated in a qualifying tournament held over several days before the event.

== Seeds ==
1. (Australia) Michelle Jaggard-Lai (second round)
2. (Australia) Kristine Kunce (second round)
3. (Czechoslovakia) Eva Švíglerová (first round)
4. (Argentina) Florencia Labat (qualifying competition, lucky loser)
5. (France) Sophie Amiach (qualified)
6. (Poland) Iwona Kuczyńska (first round)
7. (France) Nathalie Herreman (qualified)
8. (France) Julie Halard-Decugis (qualified)
9. (France) Marie-Christine Damas (first round)
10. (Czechoslovakia) Leona Lásková (first round)
11. (Japan) Akemi Nishiya (qualifying competition)
12. (France) Catherine Suire (first round)
13. (Soviet Union) Natalia Medvedeva (first round)
14. (New Zealand) Julie Richardson (first round)
15. (Poland) Renata Baranski (qualifying competition)
16. (Brazil) Gisele Miró (second round)

== Qualifiers ==
1. (United States) Sandy Collins
2. (France) Nathalie Herreman
3. (France) Pascale Paradis
4. (France) Sophie Amiach
5. (France) Julie Halard-Decugis
6. (United States) Lisa Raymond
7. (Japan) Ei Iida
8. (United States) Laxmi Poruri

== Lucky losers ==
1. (Argentina) Florencia Labat

== Qualifying draw ==
Key

- Q = Qualifier
- WC = Wild card
- LL = Lucky loser
- Alt = Alternate
- ITF = ITF entry
- PR = Protected ranking
- SR = Special ranking
- SE = Special exempt
- JE = Junior exempt
- JR = Junior Accelerator Programme entrant
- CO = College Accelerator Programme entrant
- NG = Next Gen Accelerator Program entrant
- w/o = Walkover
- r = Retired
- d = Defaulted

=== First qualifier ===
First round
1	(Australia) Michelle Jaggard-Lai	6	7^{7}
(Peru) Karim Strohmeier-Merino	3	6^{4}
(United States) Anna Ivan	2	1
(United States) Sandy Collins	6	6
WC	(United States) Susan Gilchrist	6	7^{7}
(United States) Leigh-Anne Eldredge	3	6^{1}
(Japan) Maya Kidowaki	3	6	6
13	(Soviet Union) Natalia Medvedeva	6	3	4

Second round
1	(Australia) Michelle Jaggard-Lai	1	4
(United States) Sandy Collins	6	6
WC	(United States) Susan Gilchrist	6	6
(Japan) Maya Kidowaki	4	0

Qualifying competition
(United States) Sandy Collins	6	6
WC	(United States) Susan Gilchrist	2	2

=== Second qualifier ===
First round
11	(Japan) Akemi Nishiya	6	6
(France) Maïder Laval	2	0
(United States) Kimberly Po	6	4	6
(Bulgaria) Magdalena Maleeva	4	6	2
(Canada) Patricia Hy-Boulais	4	3
(Peru) Pilar Vásquez	6	6
(Brazil) Luciana Tella	2	0
7	(France) Nathalie Herreman	6	6

Second round
11	(Japan) Akemi Nishiya	6	6
(United States) Kimberly Po	1	4
(Peru) Pilar Vásquez	4	3
7	(France) Nathalie Herreman	6	6

Qualifying competition
11	(Japan) Akemi Nishiya	2	6	5
7	(France) Nathalie Herreman	6	1	7

=== Third qualifier ===
First round
4	(Argentina) Florencia Labat	6	6
(Italy) Silvia Farina Elia	1	2
(United States) Ginger Helgeson-Nielsen	3	2
(United Kingdom) Clare Wood	6	6
(France) Pascale Paradis	6	7
(United Kingdom) Valda Lake	2	5
(United States) Amy Schwartz	2	2
16	(Brazil) Gisele Miró	6	6

Second round
4	(Argentina) Florencia Labat	6	2	7
(United Kingdom) Clare Wood	1	6	5
(France) Pascale Paradis	6	6
16	(Brazil) Gisele Miró	1	2

Qualifying competition
4	(Argentina) Florencia Labat	3	2
(France) Pascale Paradis	6	6

=== Fourth qualifier ===
First round
9	(France) Marie-Christine Damas	1	1
(Czechoslovakia) Iva Budařová	6	6
(United States) Kate Gompert	2	6	6
(United Kingdom) Amanda Grunfeld	6	4	1
(United States) Lea Antonoplis	6	0	6
(United States) Pam Casale	3	6	4
(Netherlands) Carin Bakkum	2	2
5	(France) Sophie Amiach	6	6

Second round
(Czechoslovakia) Iva Budařová	6	3	0
(United States) Kate Gompert	4	6	6
(United States) Lea Antonoplis	5	3
5	(France) Sophie Amiach	7	6

Qualifying competition
(United States) Kate Gompert	6	5	0
5	(France) Sophie Amiach	1	7	6

=== Fifth qualifier ===
First round
8	(France) Julie Halard-Decugis	6	4	6
(Japan) Masako Yanagi	4	6	1
(Argentina) Adriana Villagrán	7^{7}	6
(United States) Jeri Ingram	6^{4}	3
(Sweden) Maria Lindström	6	4	1
WC	(United States) Jessica Emmons	4	6	6
WC	(United States) Shannan McCarthy	6	7
14	(New Zealand) Julie Richardson	1	5

Second round
8	(France) Julie Halard-Decugis	6	7
(Argentina) Adriana Villagrán	3	5
WC	(United States) Jessica Emmons	4	0
WC	(United States) Shannan McCarthy	6	6

Qualifying competition
8	(France) Julie Halard-Decugis	6	6
WC	(United States) Shannan McCarthy	2	1

=== Sixth qualifier ===
First round
15	(Poland) Renata Baranski	1	6	6
WC	(United States) Shawn Foltz	6	4	0
WC	(United States) Iwalani McCalla	6	6
(United States) Elly Hakami	3	3
WC	(United States) Lisa Raymond	6	6
(Mexico) Angélica Gavaldón	2	3
(United States) Lisa Green	4	7	6
3	(Czechoslovakia) Eva Švíglerová	6	5	2

Second round
15	(Poland) Renata Baranski	6	6
WC	(United States) Iwalani McCalla	4	1
WC	(United States) Lisa Raymond	6	6
(United States) Lisa Green	3	3

Qualifying competition
15	(Poland) Renata Baranski	3	1
WC	(United States) Lisa Raymond	6	6

=== Seventh qualifier ===
First round
6	(Poland) Iwona Kuczyńska	1	2
(Japan) Ei Iida	6	6
(United States) Heather Ludloff	4	3
WC	(United States) Debbie Graham	6	6
(South Africa) Robyn Field	7^{7}	4	5
(South Africa) Linda Barnard	6^{5}	6	7
(Brazil) Luciana Corsato-Owsianka	5	7	6
12	(France) Catherine Suire	7	5	2

Second round
(Japan) Ei Iida	4	7	6
WC	(United States) Debbie Graham	6	5	4
(South Africa) Linda Barnard	4	7	5
(Brazil) Luciana Corsato-Owsianka	6	5	7

Qualifying competition
(Japan) Ei Iida	4	6	7
(Brazil) Luciana Corsato-Owsianka	6	3	5

=== Eighth qualifier ===
First round
10	(Czechoslovakia) Leona Lásková	0	1
(United Kingdom) Anne Simpkin	6	6
(United States) Andrea Leand	6	4	6
(United States) Kathrin Keil	1	6	4
WC	(United States) Tanya Stasiuk	0	3
(United States) Laxmi Poruri	6	6
(Czechoslovakia) Andrea Holíková	3	2
2	(Australia) Kristine Kunce	6	6

Second round
(United Kingdom) Anne Simpkin	6	5	6^{5}
(United States) Andrea Leand	1	7	7^{7}
(United States) Laxmi Poruri	6	6
2	(Australia) Kristine Kunce	1	1

Qualifying competition
(United States) Andrea Leand	4	6^{4}
(United States) Laxmi Poruri	6	7^{7}
