= 1989 in tennis =

This page covers all the important events in the sport of tennis in 1989. It provides the results of notable tournaments throughout the year on both the men's and women's tennis curcits, the Davis Cup, and the Federation Cup.

== Australian Open ==
Category	Champion(s)	Finalist(s)	Score
Men's singles	(Czechoslovakia) Ivan Lendl	(Czechoslovakia) Miloslav Mečíř	6–2, 6–2, 6–2 (Note: It was Lendl's 7th career Grand Slam title and his 1st Australian Open title.)
Women's singles	(West Germany) Steffi Graf	(Czechoslovakia) Helena Suková	6–4, 6–4 (Note: It was Graf's 6th career Grand Slam title and her 2nd Australian Open title.)
Men's doubles	(United States) Rick Leach (United States) Jim Pugh	(Australia) Darren Cahill (Australia) Mark Kratzmann	6–4, 6–4, 6–4 (Note: It was Leach's 2nd career Grand Slam title and his 2nd Australian Open title. It was Pugh's 4th career Grand Slam title and his 3rd Australian Open title.)
Women's doubles	(United States) Martina Navratilova (United States) Pam Shriver	(United States) Patty Fendick (Canada) Jill Hetherington	3–6, 6–3, 6–2 (Note: It was Navratilova's 52nd career Grand Slam title and her 11th Australian Open title. It was Shriver's 21st career Grand Slam title and her 7th and last Australian Open title.)
Mixed doubles	(Czechoslovakia) Jana Novotná (United States) Jim Pugh	(United States) Zina Garrison (United States) Sherwood Stewart	6–3, 6–4 (Note: It was Novotná's 3rd career Grand Slam title and her 2nd Australian Open title. It was Pugh's 5th career Grand Slam title and his 4th Australian Open title.)

== French Open ==
Category	Champion(s)	Finalist(s)	Score
Men's singles	(United States) Michael Chang (Note: At the age of 17, Chang became the youngest-ever male Grand Slam singles title winner.)	(Sweden) Stefan Edberg	6–1, 3–6, 4–6, 6–4, 6–2 (Note: It was Chang's 1st title of the year, and his 2nd overall. It was his 1st (and only) career Grand Slam title.)
Women's singles	(Spain) Arantxa Sánchez Vicario (Note: Sánchez became the first Spanish woman to win a Grand Slam singles title.)	(West Germany) Steffi Graf	7–6^{(8–6)}, 3–6, 7–5 (Note: It was Sánchez Vicario's 2nd title of the year, and her 3rd overall. It was her 1st career Grand Slam title.)
Men's doubles	(United States) Jim Grabb (United States) Patrick McEnroe	(Iran) Mansour Bahrami (France) Éric Winogradsky	6–4, 2–6, 6–4, 7–6^{(7–5)}
Women's doubles	(Soviet Union) Larisa Savchenko Neiland (Soviet Union) Natalia Zvereva	(West Germany) Steffi Graf (Argentina) Gabriela Sabatini	6–4, 6–4
Mixed doubles	(Netherlands) Manon Bollegraf (Netherlands) Tom Nijssen	(Argentina) Horacio de la Peña (Spain) Arantxa Sánchez Vicario	6–3, 6–7, 6–2

== Wimbledon ==
Category	Champion(s)	Finalist(s)	Score
Men's singles	(West Germany) Boris Becker	(Sweden) Stefan Edberg	6–0, 7–6^{(7–1)}, 6–4 (Note: It was Becker's 3rd career Grand Slam title and his 3rd and last Wimbledon title.)
Women's singles	(West Germany) Steffi Graf	(United States) Martina Navratilova	6–2, 6–7^{(1–7)}, 6–1 (Note: It was Graf's 7th career Grand Slam title and her 2nd Wimbledon title.)
Men's doubles	(Australia) John Fitzgerald (Sweden) Anders Järryd	(United States) Rick Leach (United States) Jim Pugh	3–6, 7–6^{(7–4)}, 6–4, 7–6^{(7–4)} (Note: It was Fitzgerald's 5th career Grand Slam title and his 1st Wimbledon title. It was Järryd's 5th career Grand Slam title and his 1st Wimbledon title.)
Women's doubles	(Czechoslovakia) Jana Novotná (Czechoslovakia) Helena Suková	(Soviet Union) Larisa Savchenko (Soviet Union) Natasha Zvereva	6–1, 6–2 (Note: It was Novotná's 4th career Grand Slam title and her 1st Wimbledon title. It was Suková's 3rd career Grand Slam title and her 2nd Wimbledon title.)
Mixed doubles	(United States) Jim Pugh (Czechoslovakia) Jana Novotná	(Australia) Mark Kratzmann (Australia) Jenny Byrne	6–4, 5–7, 6–4 (Note: It was Novotná's 5th career Grand Slam title and her 2nd Wimbledon title. It was Pugh's 3rd career Grand Slam title and his 1st Wimbledon title.)

== US Open ==
Category	Champion(s)	Finalist(s)	Score
Men's singles	(West Germany) Boris Becker (Note: It was Becker's 4th career Grand Slam title and his only US Open title.)	(Czechoslovakia) Ivan Lendl	7–6^{(7–2)}, 1–6, 6–3, 7–6^{(7–4)}
Women's singles	(West Germany) Steffi Graf	(United States) Martina Navratilova	3–6, 7–5, 6–1 (Note: It was Graf's 9th career Grand Slam title and her 2nd US Open title.)
Men's doubles	(United States) John McEnroe (Australia) Mark Woodforde	(United States) Ken Flach (United States) Robert Seguso	6–4, 4–6, 6–3, 6–3 (Note: It was McEnroe's 16th career Grand Slam title and his 8th and last US Open title. It was Woodforde's 1st career Grand Slam title and his 1st US Open title.)
Women's doubles	(Australia) Hana Mandlíková (United States) Martina Navratilova	(United States) Mary Joe Fernández (United States) Pam Shriver	5–7, 6–4, 6–4 (Note: It was Mandlíková's 5th and last career Grand Slam title and her 2nd US Open title. It was Navratilova's 52nd career Grand Slam title and her 14th US Open title.)
Mixed doubles	(United States) Robin White (United States) Shelby Cannon	(United States) Meredith McGrath (United States) Rick Leach	3–6, 6–2, 7–5 (Note: It was White's 2nd and last career Grand Slam title and her 2nd US Open title. It was Cannon's only career Grand Slam title.)

== Davis Cup ==
First round 3–5 February
Malmö, Sweden (indoor carpet)
Sweden	4
Italy	1
Vienna, Austria (indoor clay)
Australia	0
Austria	5
Belgrade, Yugoslavia (indoor clay)
Yugoslavia	4
Denmark	1
Marbella, Spain (clay)
Spain	3
Mexico	2
Fort Myers, FL, United States (hard)
Paraguay	0
United States	5
Tel Aviv, Israel (indoor carpet)
Israel	1
France	4
Prague, Czechoslovakia (indoor carpet)
Soviet Union	1
Czechoslovakia	4
Karlsruhe, West Germany (indoor carpet)
Indonesia	0
West Germany	5

Quarterfinals; 7–9 April
Vienna, Austria (indoor clay)
Sweden	3
Austria	2
Split, Yugoslavia (indoor carpet)
Yugoslavia	4
Spain	1
San Diego, CA, United States (indoor carpet)
United States	5
France	0
Prague, Czechoslovakia (indoor carpet)
Czechoslovakia	2
West Germany	3

Semifinals; 21–23 July
Båstad, Sweden (clay)
Sweden	4
Yugoslavia	1
Munich, West Germany (indoor carpet)
United States	2
West Germany	3

Final; 15–17 December
Stuttgart, West Germany (indoor carpet)
Sweden	2
West Germany	3

== Federation Cup ==
First Round
Czechoslovakia	3
Belgium	0
Q	Thailand	0
Hungary	3
Sweden	0
Japan	3
Finland	0
West Germany	3
Austria	2
Q	Mexico	1
Q	Indonesia	0
Great Britain	3
United States	3
Greece	0
Q	Poland	0
Denmark	3
Australia	3
Q	China	0
Italy	1
New Zealand	2
Q	South Korea	0
Bulgaria	3
Q	Philippines	0
Argentina	2
Spain	2
France	0
Q	Yugoslavia	0
Netherlands	2
Canada	2
Brazil	1
Switzerland	0
Soviet Union	2

Second Round
Czechoslovakia	2
Hungary	1
Japan	0
West Germany	3
Austria	2
Great Britain	1
United States	3
Denmark	0
Australia	3
New Zealand	0
Bulgaria	3
Argentina	0
Spain	2
Netherlands	0
Canada	1
Soviet Union	2

Quarterfinals
Czechoslovakia	2
West Germany	1
Austria	0
United States	3
Australia	2
Bulgaria	1
Spain	2
Soviet Union	1

Semifinals
Czechoslovakia	0
United States	2
Australia	0
Spain	2

Final
United States	3
Spain	0
