= 1989 OTB Open – Men's singles =

Men's tennis tournament

Men's singles
- 1989 OTB Open

Final
- Champion: (Australia) Simon Youl
- Runner-up: (United States) Scott Davis
- Score: 2–6, 6–4, 6–4

Details
- Draw: 32
- Seeds: 8

Events
Singles	men	women
Doubles	men	women
← 1988 ·	OTB Open	· 1990 →

Tim Mayotte was the defending champion, but did not participate this year.

Simon Youl won the tournament, beating Scott Davis in the final, 2–6, 6–4, 6–4.

== Seeds ==
1. (United States) Dan Goldie (semifinals)
2. (United States) Richard Matuszewski (first round)
3. (India) Ramesh Krishnan (quarterfinals)
4. (United States) Scott Davis (final)
5. (Australia) John Frawley (first round)
6. (Canada) Martin Laurendeau (second round)
7. (United States) Jeff Tarango (quarterfinals)
8. (Canada) Glenn Michibata (semifinals)

== Draw ==
=== Key ===
- Q = Qualifier
- WC = Wild card
- LL = Lucky loser
- Alt = Alternate
- SE = Special exempt
- PR = Protected ranking
- ITF = ITF entry
- JE = Junior exempt
- w/o = Walkover
- r = Retired
- d = Defaulted
- SR = Special ranking

=== Finals ===
Semifinals
1	(United States) Dan Goldie	6	4	1
4	(United States) Scott Davis	3	6	6
(Australia) Simon Youl	3	7	7
8	(Canada) Glenn Michibata	6	6	6

Final
4	(United States) Scott Davis	6	4	4
(Australia) Simon Youl	2	6	6

=== Top half ===
First round
1	(United States) D Goldie	6	6
(Australia) B Dyke	3	3
(Puerto Rico) M Nido	3	7	7
(United States) P Johnson	6	6	6
(United States) N Caswell	5	2
(India) V Amritraj	7	6
Q	(Canada) G Connell	3	4
7	(United States) J Tarango	6	6
4	(United States) S Davis	6	7	6
Q	(United States) J Boytim	7	6	2
(United States) M Allen	2	4
(United Kingdom) N Broad	6	6
(South Africa) M Robertson	6	3	7
WC	(United States) C Garner	1	6	6
(United States) S Warner	6	6
5	(Australia) J Frawley	3	4

Second round
1	(United States) D Goldie	6	6
(Puerto Rico) M Nido	2	4
(India) V Amritraj	3	3
7	(United States) J Tarango	6	6
4	(United States) S Davis	7	6
(United Kingdom) N Broad	5	1
(South Africa) M Robertson	7	6	5
(United States) S Warner	6	7	7

Quarterfinals
1	(United States) D Goldie	1	7	6
7	(United States) J Tarango	6	6	2
4	(United States) S Davis	7	6
(United States) S Warner	5	1

Semifinals
1	(United States) D Goldie	6	4	1
4	(United States) S Davis	3	6	6

=== Bottom half ===
First round
6	(Canada) M Laurendeau	6	6
WC	(United States) T Ho	1	4
(Australia) S Youl	6	4	7
(Australia) R Fromberg	2	6	5
(Spain) JC Báguena	2	4
(Jamaica) D Burke	6	6
Q	(United States) B Pearce	3	3
3	(India) R Krishnan	6	6
8	(Canada) G Michibata	6	6	6
(South Africa) B Moir	4	7	4
(United States) K Kinnear	6	4	4
(Nigeria) N Odizor	4	6	6
Q	(Sweden) V Jansson	4	4
(Canada) C Pridham	6	6
(Finland) O Rahnasto	6	2	6
2	(United States) R Matuszewski	3	6	4

Second round
6	(Canada) M Laurendeau	4	0
(Australia) S Youl	6	6
(Jamaica) D Burke	3	2
3	(India) R Krishnan	6	6
8	(Canada) G Michibata	6	6
(Nigeria) N Odizor	2	3
(Canada) C Pridham	3	6	6
(Finland) O Rahnasto	6	1	2

Quarterfinals
(Australia) S Youl	6	3	7
3	(India) R Krishnan	3	6	5
8	(Canada) G Michibata	7	6
(Canada) C Pridham	6	4

Semifinals
(Australia) S Youl	3	7	7
8	(Canada) G Michibata	6	6	6
