= 1989 OTB Open – Women's singles =

Women's singles
- 1989 OTB Open

Final
- Champion: (Peru) Laura Gildemeister
- Runner-up: (United States) Marianne Werdel
- Score: 6–4, 6–3

Details
- Draw: 56
- Seeds: 16

Events
Singles	men	women
Doubles	men	women
← 1988 ·	OTB Open	· 1990 →

Gretchen Magers was the defending champion but lost in the semifinals to Laura Gildemeister.

Gildemeister won in the final 6–4, 6–3 against Marianne Werdel.

== Seeds ==
A champion seed is indicated in bold text while text in italics indicates the round in which that seed was eliminated. The top eight seeds received a bye to the second round.

1. (United States) Gretchen Magers (semifinals)
2. (United States) Halle Cioffi (second round)
3. (United States) Ann Grossman (third round)
4. (United States) Betsy Nagelsen (second round)
5. (United States) Ann Henricksson (quarterfinals)
6. (United States) Carrie Cunningham (second round)
7. (United States) Beverly Bowes (third round)
8. (Peru) **Laura Gildemeister (champion)**
9. (United States) Louise Allen (third round)
10. (Switzerland) Eva Krapl (second round)
11. (United States) Stacey Martin (quarterfinals)
12. (United States) Beth Herr (third round)
13. (United States) Hu Na (third round)
14. (United States) Marianne Werdel (final)
15. (United States) Kim Kessaris (second round)
16. (Australia) Michelle Jaggard (second round)

== Draw ==
=== Key ===
- Q = Qualifier
- WC = Wild card
- LL = Lucky loser
- Alt = Alternate
- SE = Special exempt
- PR = Protected ranking
- ITF = ITF entry
- JE = Junior exempt
- w/o = Walkover
- r = Retired
- d = Defaulted
- SR = Special ranking

=== Finals ===
Semifinals
1	(United States) Gretchen Magers	4	3
8	(Peru) **Laura Gildemeister**	**6**	**6**
14	(United States) **Marianne Werdel**	**6**	**6**
2	(United States) Halle Cioffi	2	0

Final
8	(Peru) **Laura Gildemeister**	**6**	**6**
14	(United States) Marianne Werdel	4	3

=== Top half ===
==== Section 1 ====
First round
(United States) **L Green**	**6**	**6**
(Australia) A Scott	0	0
(United Kingdom) A Hobbs	2	4
(Hong Kong) **P Hy**	**6**	**6**
(United States) V Nelson-Dunbar	**7**	5	1
9	(United States) **L Allen**	5	**7**	**6**
13	(United States) **H Na**	**6**	**6**
(United States) J Smoller	4	2
(United States) **L Poruri**	**6**	**6**
(United States) A Leand	1	3
(United States) **J Santrock**	**6**	**6**
(United States) C Christian	2	4

Second round
1	(United States) **G Magers**	**6**	**6**
(United States) L Green	3	4
(Hong Kong) P Hy	2	2
9	(United States) **L Allen**	**6**	**6**
13	(United States) **H Na**	**6**	4	**6**
(United States) L Poruri	3	**6**	0
(United States) J Santrock	4	4
5	(United States) **A Henricksson**	**6**	**6**

Third round
1	(United States) **G Magers**	**6**	4	**6**
9	(United States) L Allen	2	**6**	4
13	(United States) H Na	1	3
5	(United States) **A Henricksson**	**6**	**6**

Quarterfinals
1	(United States) **G Magers**	**6**	**6**
5	(United States) A Henricksson	3	2

==== Section 2 ====
First round
(Poland) **R Baranski**	**6**	**6**
(United States) B Gerken	4	3
(United States) J Thomas	2	5
(United States) **D Graham**	**6**	**7**
(United States) L-A Eldredge	3	**6**	2
16	(Australia) **M Jaggard**	**6**	4	**6**
12	(United States) **B Herr**	**6**	**6**
(Austria) B Reinstadler	3	1
(United States) **A Grousbeck**	**6**	**6**
(United States) A Creek	3	3
(Mexico) **A Gavaldón**	**7**	**6**
(South Africa) L Barnard	6	3

Second round
4	(United States) B Nagelsen	3	2
(Poland) **R Baranski**	**6**	**6**
(United States) **D Graham**	**6**	**6**
16	(Australia) M Jaggard	3	4
12	(United States) **B Herr**	2	**6**	**6**
(United States) A Grousbeck	**6**	4	4
(Mexico) A Gavaldón	4	4
8	(Peru) **L Gildemeister**	**6**	**6**

Third round
(Poland) **R Baranski**	**6**	**6**
(United States) D Graham	3	1
12	(United States) B Herr	5	1
8	(Peru) **L Gildemeister**	**7**	**6**

Quarterfinals
(Poland) R Baranski	4	4
8	(Peru) **L Gildemeister**	**6**	**6**

=== Bottom half ===
==== Section 3 ====
First round
(Netherlands) T Wilmink	5	1
(United States) **L Harvey-Wild**	**7**	**6**
(United States) **J Ingram**	**6**	**6**
(Finland) A Aallonen	2	2
(United States) K Shin	5	3
14	(United States) **M Werdel**	**7**	**6**
11	(United States) **S Martin**	**6**	4	**6**
(United States) K Gompert	2	**6**	1
(South Africa) R Field	2	2
(United States) **A Ivan**	**6**	**6**
(United Kingdom) J Salmon	2	5
(United States) **L Antonoplis**	**6**	**7**

Second round
7	(United States) **B Bowes**	**6**	**6**
(United States) L Harvey-Wild	1	2
(United States) J Ingram	0	**7**	3
14	(United States) **M Werdel**	**6**	6	**6**
11	(United States) **S Martin**	**6**	**6**
(United States) A Ivan	1	3
(United States) L Antonoplis	4	6
3	(United States) **A Grossman**	**6**	**7**

Third round
7	(United States) B Bowes	**6**	4	3
14	(United States) **M Werdel**	3	**6**	**6**
11	(United States) **S Martin**	**6**	3	**6**
3	(United States) A Grossman	3	**6**	3

Quarterfinals
14	(United States) **M Werdel**	**6**	**6**
11	(United States) S Martin	4	1

==== Section 4 ====
First round
(Japan) **T Takagi**	**6**	**6**
(South Africa) R Gaddie	1	0
(Peru) K Strohmeier-Merino	4	1
(United States) **S Birch**	**6**	**6**
(Japan) E Iida	4	5
15	(United States) **K Kessaris**	**6**	**7**
10	(Switzerland) **E Krapl**	4	**6**	**6**
(United States) J Whalen	**6**	1	1
(Brazil) T Zambrzycki	3	**6**	6
(United States) **A Schwartz**	**6**	2	**7**
(Peru) **P Vásquez**	**6**	**6**
(United Kingdom) L Gould	1	1

Second round
6	(United States) C Cunningham	**6**	6	6
(Japan) **T Takagi**	2	**7**	**7**
(United States) **S Birch**	**6**	**7**
15	(United States) K Kessaris	3	5
10	(Switzerland) E Krapl	**6**	4	r
(United States) **A Schwartz**	2	**6**
(Peru) P Vásquez	**6**	4	3
2	(United States) **H Cioffi**	4	**6**	**6**

Third round
(Japan) T Takagi	3	1
(United States) **S Birch**	**6**	**6**
(United States) A Schwartz	1	4
2	(United States) **H Cioffi**	**6**	**6**

Quarterfinals
(United States) S Birch	**6**	1	3
2	(United States) **H Cioffi**	4	**6**	**6**
