= 1989 OTB Open – Women's doubles =

Women's doubles
- 1989 OTB Open
- 1988 Champions: (United States) Ann Henricksson (New Zealand) Julie Richardson

Final
- Champions: (Australia) Michelle Jaggard (United States) Hu Na
- Runners-up: (United States) Sandra Birch (United States) Debbie Graham
- Score: 6–3, 6–2

Events
Singles	men	women
Doubles	men	women
← 1988 ·	OTB Open	· 1990 →

Ann Henricksson and Julie Richardson were the defending champions but only Henricksson competed that year with Gretchen Magers.

Henricksson and Magers lost in the quarterfinals to Michelle Jaggard and Hu Na.

Jaggard and Na won in the final 6–3, 6–2 against Sandra Birch and Debbie Graham.

== Seeds ==
Champion seeds are indicated in bold text while text in italics indicates the round in which those seeds were eliminated. All eight seeded teams received byes into the second round.

1. (United States) Ann Henricksson / (United States) Gretchen Magers (quarterfinals)
2. (United States) Jill Smoller / (United States) Marianne Werdel (quarterfinals)
3. (United States) Louise Allen / (United States) Beverly Bowes (semifinals)
4. (South Africa) Linda Barnard / (United States) Jane Thomas (semifinals)
5. (United Kingdom) Anne Hobbs / (Australia) Alison Scott (quarterfinals)
6. (Switzerland) Eva Krapl / (United Kingdom) Julie Salmon (quarterfinals)
7. (Australia) **Michelle Jaggard** / (United States) **Hu Na (champions)**
8. (Finland) Anne Aallonen / (Hong Kong) Patricia Hy (second round)

== Draw ==
=== Key ===
- Q = Qualifier
- WC = Wild card
- LL = Lucky loser
- Alt = Alternate
- SE = Special exempt
- PR = Protected ranking
- ITF = ITF entry
- JE = Junior exempt
- w/o = Walkover
- r = Retired
- d = Defaulted
- SR = Special ranking

=== Final ===
Final

7
- (Australia) **Michelle Jaggard**
- (United States) **Hu Na**
**6**
**6**

- (United States) Sandra Birch
- (United States) Debbie Graham
3
2

=== Top half ===
First round

Second round

Quarterfinals

Semifinals

1
- (United States) **A Henricksson**
- (United States) **G Magers**
4
**7**
**6**

- (United States) L Harvey-Wild
- (Japan) T Takagi
3
0

- (United States) L Antonoplis
- (United States) B Gerken
**6**
5
3

- (United States) **L Antonoplis**
- (United States) **B Gerken**
**6**
**6**

1
- (United States) A Henricksson
- (United States) G Magers
6
4

- (Japan) **E Iida**
- (Netherlands) **T Wilmink**
**6**
**6**

7
- (Australia) **M Jaggard**
- (United States) **H Na**
**7**
**6**

- (United States) C Christian
- (United Kingdom) L Gould
4
2

- (Japan) E Iida
- (Netherlands) T Wilmink
3
0

7
- (Australia) **M Jaggard**
- (United States) **H Na**
**6**
**6**

7
- (Australia) **M Jaggard**
- (United States) **H Na**
6
**7**
**6**

4
- (South Africa) L Barnard
- (United States) J Thomas
**7**
5
3

4
- (South Africa) **L Barnard**
- (United States) **J Thomas**
**6**
**6**

- (Poland) **R Baranski**
- (Peru) **K Strohmeier-Merino**
**6**
**6**

- (Poland) R Baranski
- (Peru) K Strohmeier-Merino
4
3

- (United States) A Creek
- (South Africa) R Gaddie
3
2

4
- (South Africa) **L Barnard**
- (United States) **J Thomas**
**7**
5
**6**

- (United States) **H Cioffi**
- (United States) **A Leand**
**6**
**6**

5
- (United Kingdom) A Hobbs
- (Australia) A Scott
6
**7**
4

- (United States) J Ingram
- (United States) S Martin
4
2

- (United States) H Cioffi
- (United States) A Leand
4
3

5
- (United Kingdom) **A Hobbs**
- (Australia) **A Scott**
**6**
**6**

=== Bottom half ===
First round

Second round

Quarterfinals

Semifinals

6
- (Switzerland) **E Krapl**
- (United Kingdom) **J Salmon**
**6**
4
**6**

- (South Africa) **R Field**
- (Republic of Ireland) **L O'Halloran**
**6**
**6**

- (South Africa) R Field
- (Republic of Ireland) L O'Halloran
1
**6**
2

- (United States) L Green
- (United States) A Ivan
4
2

6
- (Switzerland) E Krapl
- (United Kingdom) J Salmon
**7**
0
2

- (United States) **A Schwartz**
- (Peru) **P Vásquez**
**6**
**6**

3
- (United States) **L Allen**
- (United States) **B Bowes**
5
**6**
**6**

- (United States) H Rosenbaum
- (United States) K Waterman
4
4

- (United States) A Schwartz
- (Peru) P Vásquez
3
0

3
- (United States) **L Allen**
- (United States) **B Bowes**
**6**
**6**

3
- (United States) L Allen
- (United States) B Bowes
4
2

- (United States) **S Birch**
- (United States) **D Graham**
**6**
**6**

8
- (Finland) A Aallonen
- (Hong Kong) P Hy
4
4

- (United States) **S Birch**
- (United States) **D Graham**
**6**
**6**

- (United States) **S Birch**
- (United States) **D Graham**
**6**
**6**

- (United States) C Cunningham
- (United States) A Grossman
3
1

- (United States) **S Birch**
- (United States) **D Graham**
**6**
**6**

- (United States) S Givens
- (United States) L McNeil
3
2

2
- (United States) J Smoller
- (United States) M Werdel
1
4

- (United States) **L-A Eldredge**
- (United States) **A Grousbeck**
**6**
**6**

- (United States) L-A Eldredge
- (United States) A Grousbeck
1
4

2
- (United States) **J Smoller**
- (United States) **M Werdel**
**6**
**6**
