= 1988 OTB Open – Men's singles =

Men's singles
- 1988 OTB Open

Final
- Champion: (United States) Tim Mayotte
- Runner-up: (United States) Johan Kriek
- Score: 5–7, 6–3, 6–2

Details
- Draw: 32
- Seeds: 8

Events
| Singles | men | women |
| Doubles | men | women |
- OTB Open

Jaime Yzaga was the defending champion, but did not participate this year.

Tim Mayotte won the tournament, beating Johan Kriek in the final, 5–7, 6–3, 6–2.

== Seeds ==
1. (United States) Tim Mayotte (champion)
2. (United States) Paul Annacone (second round)
3. (United States) Johan Kriek (final)
4. (United States) Michael Kures (first round)
5. (Canada) Martin Laurendeau (first round)
6. (United States) Richard Matuszewski (second round)
7. (South Africa) Michael Robertson (first round)
8. (Sweden) Rikard Bergh (first round)

== Draw ==
Key

- Q = Qualifier
- WC = Wild card
- LL = Lucky loser
- Alt = Alternate
- ITF = ITF entry
- PR = Protected ranking
- SR = Special ranking
- SE = Special exempt
- JE = Junior exempt
- JR = Junior Accelerator Programme entrant
- CO = College Accelerator Programme entrant
- NG = Next Gen Accelerator Program entrant
- w/o = Walkover
- r = Retired
- d = Defaulted

=== Finals ===
Semifinals
1 | (United States) Tim Mayotte | 6 | 7
(United States) Pete Sampras | 2 | 6
3 | (United States) Johan Kriek | 6 | 6
(Sweden) Thomas Högstedt | 0 | 2

Final
1 | (United States) Tim Mayotte | 5 | 6 | 6
3 | (United States) Johan Kriek | 7 | 3 | 2

=== Top half ===
First round
1 | (United States) T Mayotte | 6 | 7
Q | (United States) M Basham | 2 | 5
(West Germany) C Geyer | 4 | 1
(United States) G Layendecker | 6 | 6
(United States) P Johnson | 3 | 6 | 6
(United States) S DeVries | 6 | 3 | 1
(Mexico) L Lavalle | 6 | 7
7 | (South Africa) M Robertson | 4 | 6
4 | (United States) M Kures | 6 | 6 | 4
(Italy) G Pozzi | 2 | 7 | 6
(United States) P Sampras | 6 | 6
(West Germany) W Popp | 2 | 1
(Jamaica) D Burke | 6 | 6
(United States) J Gurfein | 3 | 4
WC | (United States) M Blackman | 6 | 6 | 6
5 | (Canada) M Laurendeau | 7 | 4 | 2

Second round
1 | (United States) T Mayotte | 6 | 6
(United States) G Layendecker | 4 | 3
(United States) P Johnson | 7 | 2 | 2
(Mexico) L Lavalle | 5 | 6 | 6
(Italy) G Pozzi | 1 | 5
(United States) P Sampras | 6 | 7
(Jamaica) D Burke | 6 | 7
WC | (United States) M Blackman | 3 | 6

Quarterfinals
1 | (United States) T Mayotte | 7 | 6
(Mexico) L Lavalle | 6 | 2
(United States) P Sampras | 6 | 6
(Jamaica) D Burke | 3 | 3

Semifinals
1 | (United States) T Mayotte | 6 | 7
(United States) P Sampras | 2 | 6

=== Bottom half ===
First round
6 | (United States) R Matuszewski | 6 | 6
(West Germany) A Mronz | 4 | 4
(Nigeria) T Mmoh | 2 | 3
WC | (United States) P McEnroe | 6 | 6
(India) Z Ali | 6 | 7
(United States) P Chamberlin | 3 | 6
(United States) M Bauer | 2 | 5
3 | (United States) J Kriek | 6 | 7
8 | (Sweden) R Bergh | 6 | 1^{r}
Q | (United States) C Beckman | 7 | 4
(United States) J Levine | 1 | 4
Q | (United States) D Goldberg | 6 | 6
Q | (Uruguay) D Montes de Oca | 2 | 2
(Sweden) T Högstedt | 6 | 6
(United States) L Scott | 1 | 2
2 | (United States) P Annacone | 6 | 6

Second round
6 | (United States) R Matuszewski | 3 | 4
WC | (United States) P McEnroe | 6 | 6
(India) Z Ali | 3 | 2
3 | (United States) J Kriek | 6 | 6
Q | (United States) C Beckman | 4 | 3
Q | (United States) D Goldberg | 6 | 6
(Sweden) T Högstedt | 0 | 6 | 7
2 | (United States) P Annacone | 6 | 2 | 5

Quarterfinals
WC | (United States) P McEnroe | 3 | 6
3 | (United States) J Kriek | 6 | 7
Q | (United States) D Goldberg | 5 | 2
(Sweden) T Högstedt | 7 | 6

Semifinals
3 | (United States) J Kriek | 6 | 6
(Sweden) T Högstedt | 0 | 2
