= 1989 OTB Open =

- Date: July 17–23 (men); July 24–30 (women)
- Edition: 3rd
- Surface: Hard / outdoor
- Location: Schenectady, New York, US

Champions

Men's singles
- (Australia) Simon Youl

Women's singles
- (Peru) Laura Gildemeister

Men's doubles
- (United States) Scott Davis / (Australia) Broderick Dyke

Women's doubles
- (Australia) Michelle Jaggard / (United States) Hu Na
| ← 1988 · | OTB Open | · 1990 → |

The 1989 OTB Open was a tennis tournament played on outdoor hard courts in Schenectady, New York, in the United States that was part of the 1989 Nabisco Grand Prix and of Tier V of the 1989 WTA Tour. The men's tournament was held from July 17 through July 23, 1989, while the women's tournament was held from July 24 through July 30, 1989. Simon Youl and Laura Gildemeister won the singles titles.

== Finals ==
=== Men's singles ===
(Australia) Simon Youl defeated (United States) Scott Davis 2–6, 6–4, 6–4

- It was Youl's only title of the year and the 1st of his career.

=== Women's singles ===
(Peru) Laura Gildemeister defeated (United States) Marianne Werdel 6–4, 6–3

- It was Gildemeister's 1st title of the year and the 4th of her career.

=== Men's doubles ===
(United States) Scott Davis / (Australia) Broderick Dyke defeated (United States) Brad Pearce / (South Africa) Byron Talbot 2–6, 6–4, 6–4

- It was Davis' 2nd title of the year and the 9th of his career. It was Dyke's only title of the year and the 7th of his career.

=== Women's doubles ===
(Australia) Michelle Jaggard / (United States) Hu Na defeated (United States) Sandra Birch / (United States) Debbie Graham 6–3, 6–2

- It was Jaggard's only title of the year and the 2nd of her career. It was Na's only title of the year and the 1st of her career.
