= Donni Leaycraft =

American tennis player

- Country (sports): United States
- Born: July 18, 1968 (age 56); Metairie, Louisiana
- Height: 5 ft 11 in (1.80 m)
- Plays: Right-handed

Singles
- Career record: 0–2
- Career titles: 0
- Highest ranking: No. 509 (August 8, 1988)

Grand Slam singles results
- US Open: 1R (1989)

Donni Leaycraft (born July 18, 1968) is a former professional tennis player from the United States.

== Career ==
Leaycraft, who was a member of the USTA Junior Davis Cup team, won the NCAA Singles Championship in 1989. He was the first player from the LSU Tigers to have won the title and defeated Steven Jung of Nebraska in the final.

In 1989 he also competed in the main draw of the US Open. He lost in the first round to 12th seed Emilio Sánchez, in four sets.
