= Daniel Goldberg =

Daniel Goldberg may refer to:

- Daniel Goldberg (politician) (born 1965), French Socialist politician
- Daniel Goldberg (producer) (1949–2023), Canadian film producer and writer
- Dan Goldberg (tennis) (born 1967), American tennis player
