= 1989 OTB Open – Men's doubles =

Men's doubles
- 1989 OTB Open

Final
- Champions: (United States) Scott Davis (Australia) Broderick Dyke
- Runners-up: (United States) Brad Pearce (South Africa) Byron Talbot
- Score: 2–6, 6–4, 6–4

Events
Singles	men	women
Doubles	men	women
← 1988 ·	OTB Open	· 1990 →

Alexander Mronz and Greg Van Emburgh were the defending champions, but did not participate this year.

Scott Davis and Broderick Dyke won the title, defeating Brian Garrow and Sven Salumaa 2–6, 6–4, 6–4 in the final.

== Seeds ==
1. (Canada) Grant Connell / (Canada) Glenn Michibata (first round)
2. (United Kingdom) Neil Broad / (South Africa) Stefan Kruger (first round)
3. (United States) Scott Davis / (Australia) Broderick Dyke (champions)
4. (United States) Steve DeVries / (United States) Richard Matuszewski (first round)

== Draw ==
=== Key ===
- Q = Qualifier
- WC = Wild card
- LL = Lucky loser
- Alt = Alternate
- SE = Special exempt
- PR = Protected ranking
- ITF = ITF entry
- JE = Junior exempt
- w/o = Walkover
- r = Retired
- d = Defaulted
- SR = Special ranking

=== Draw ===
First round
1	(Canada) G Connell (Canada) G Michibata	3	6	5
(United States) S Cannon (United States) S Warner	6	2	7
(India) A Amritraj (India) R Krishnan	7	6
(South Africa) C Honey (Belgium) L Pimek	5	3
4	(United States) S DeVries (United States) R Matuszewski	2	4
(United States) B Pearce (South Africa) B Talbot	6	6
(United States) R Schmidt (United States) T Siegel	4	6	2
(Jamaica) D Burke (Nigeria) N Odizor	6	3	6
(United States) C Beckman (South Africa) R Deppe	6	6	7
(Australia) B Custer (Australia) S Youl	3	7	6
(United States) B Shelton (United States) K Thorne	5	2
3	(United States) S Davis (Australia) B Dyke	7	6
(Puerto Rico) M Nido (South Africa) M Robertson	6	6
(Canada) M Laurendeau (Finland) O Rahnasto	4	3
(Sweden) V Jansson (United States) K Kinnear	6	4	6
2	(United Kingdom) N Broad (South Africa) S Kruger	4	6	4

Quarterfinals
(United States) S Cannon (United States) S Warner	6	3
(India) A Amritraj (India) R Krishnan	7	6
(United States) B Pearce (South Africa) B Talbot	7	6
(Jamaica) D Burke (Nigeria) N Odizor	6	3
(United States) C Beckman (South Africa) R Deppe	5	4
3	(United States) S Davis (Australia) B Dyke	7	6
(Puerto Rico) M Nido (South Africa) M Robertson	6	7	6
(Sweden) V Jansson (United States) K Kinnear	7	6	4

Semifinals
(India) A Amritraj (India) R Krishnan	1	3
(United States) B Pearce (South Africa) B Talbot	6	6
3	(United States) S Davis (Australia) B Dyke	7	6	7
(Puerto Rico) M Nido (South Africa) M Robertson	5	7	6

Final
(United States) B Pearce (South Africa) B Talbot	6	4	4
3	(United States) S Davis (Australia) B Dyke	2	6	6
