= Magdalena Maleeva =

Bulgarian tennis player (born 1975)

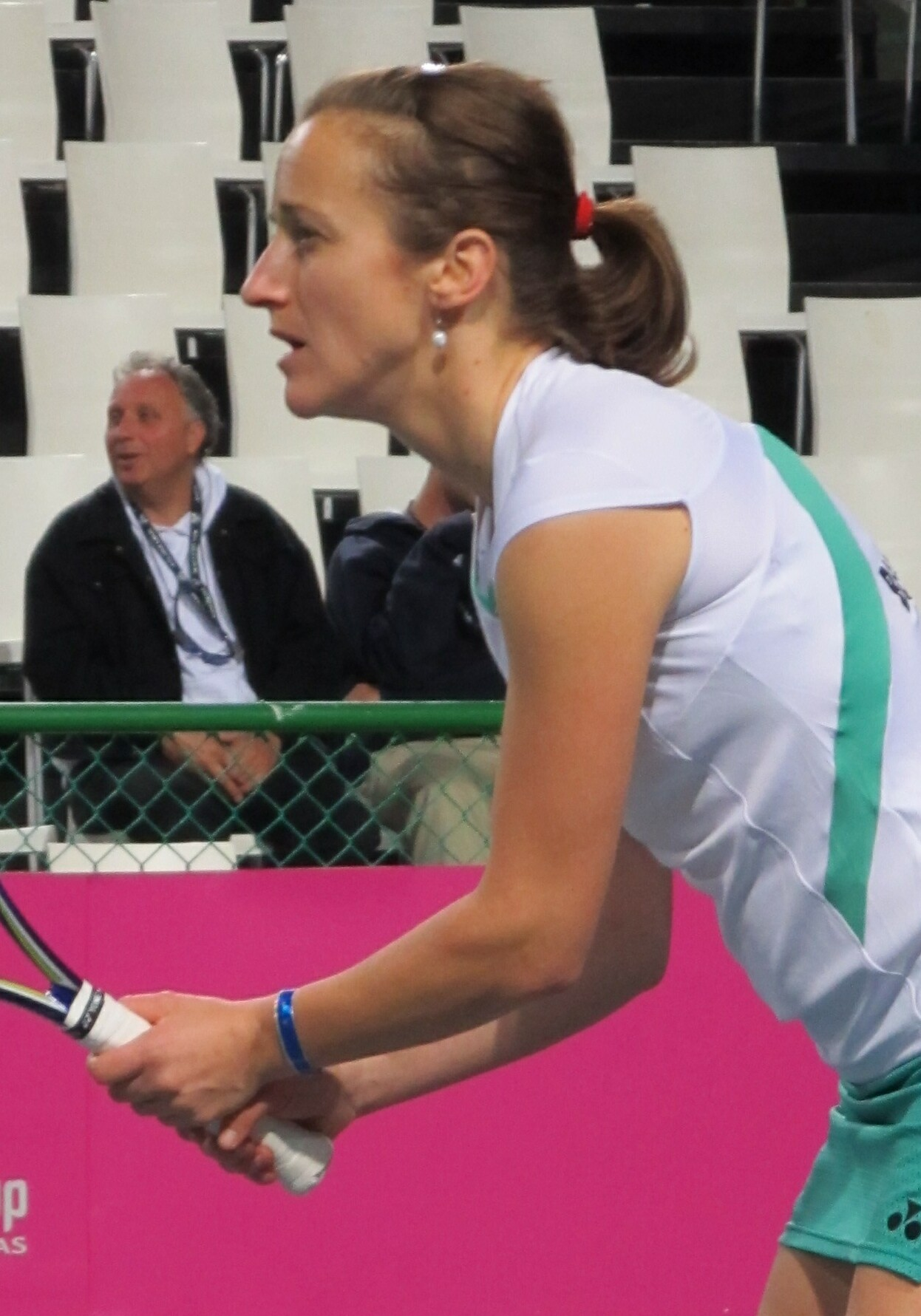
- Maleeva at the 2011 Fed Cup
- Native name: Магдалена Малеева
- Country (sports): Bulgaria
- Residence: Sofia, Bulgaria
- Born: 1 April 1975 (age 50) Sofia, Bulgaria
- Height: 1.68 m (5 ft 6 in)
- Turned pro: 1989
- Retired: 2005
- Plays: Right-handed (two-handed backhand)
- Prize money: US$ 4,398,582

Singles
- Career record: 439–290
- Career titles: 10
- Highest ranking: No. 4 (29 January 1996)

Grand Slam singles results
- Australian Open: 4R (1991, 1993, 1994, 2002)
- French Open: 4R (1993, 1996, 2003, 2004)
- Wimbledon: 4R (2001, 2002, 2004, 2005)
- US Open: QF (1992)

Other tournaments
- Tour Finals: QF (2002)
- Olympic Games: 3R (1992, 1996)

Doubles
- Career record: 121–133
- Career titles: 5
- Highest ranking: No. 13 (2 February 2004)

Grand Slam doubles results
- Australian Open: 3R (1992, 2001, 2004)
- French Open: 3R (1993)
- Wimbledon: 3R (1993, 2003)
- US Open: QF (2003)

Other doubles tournaments
- Olympic Games: 1R (1992, 1996)

Team competitions
- Fed Cup: 27–17 (singles 18–8; doubles 9-9)

Magdalena Georgieva Maleeva (Bulgarian: Магдалена Георгиева Малеева, pronounced [mɐɡdɐˈlɛnɐ mɐˈlɛɛvɐ]; born 1 April 1975) is a Bulgarian former professional tennis player. Her best WTA singles ranking was world No. 4. She played on the WTA Tour competing in singles and doubles, from April 1989 to October 2005 and has won ten career singles titles.

== Early life ==
Born in Sofia, Maleeva is the youngest of the three children of Yuliya Berberyan and Georgi Maleev. Yuliya, who came from a prominent Armenian family which found refuge in Bulgaria after the 1896 Armenian massacres in the Ottoman Empire, was one of the best Bulgarian tennis players in the 1960s. After she retired from professional tennis in the 1970s, Berberyan started on a coaching career. She trained all of her three daughters, Magdalena, Katerina and Manuela, each of whom eventually became WTA top six players.

== Career ==
=== Juniors ===
In 1988, Maleeva became the youngest ever national tennis champion of Bulgaria, at the age of 13 years and four months. She turned professional in 1989, reaching the final of her first professional tournament (ITF) at Bari. In her Grand Slam debut at the French Open in 1990, she passed the qualifications and reached the third round. In 1990, Maleeva won three junior Grand Slam tournaments at the Australian, French and US Open.

=== Professional ===
In 1992, Maleeva snatched her first WTA Tour event victory in San Marino and scored her best Grand Slam tournament result with a quarterfinal run at the US Open, upsetting Martina Navratilova on the way. The following year, she reached the fourth round at the Australian, the French and the US Open, as well as the third round of the Wimbledon Championships. That same year, she was the opponent of Monica Seles at a tournament in Hamburg, Germany when a deranged fan stabbed Seles in the back on the court.

Her best performance at a Grand Slam championship came when she got to the quarterfinals of the 1992 US Open, defeating Kateřina Kroupová-Šišková, Martina Navratilova, Kimberly Po and Chanda Rubin before losing to her older sister Manuela. In 1995, Maleeva won a total of three tournaments, in Moscow, Chicago, Oakland, which saw her hit a career-high ranking of No. 4 in January 1996.

In June 1998, Maleeva underwent shoulder surgery, which forced her off the tour for the next eleven months. She started competing again in May 1999 and re-entered top 20 in 2001. In 2002, she won the prestigious Kremlin Cup in Moscow, defeating three top-10 players on her way (Venus Williams, Amélie Mauresmo, and Lindsay Davenport). In 2004, she married her long-standing boyfriend, Lubomir Nokov.

Maleeva won a career total of ten WTA titles in singles and five in doubles. She was the recipient of the "WTA Most Improved Player 1993" award and was nominated for the "WTA Most Impressive Newcomer 1990". She participated at the Olympic Games in Barcelona, Atlanta, and Athens.

== Life after tennis ==
In October 2005, Maleeva retired from professional tennis after 16 seasons (years), and became the last of the Maleeva sisters to retire. She now lives in Sofia. On 27 June 2007, she gave birth to her first child, a girl named Youlia, and on 13 December 2008, she gave birth to a second child, Marko, and on 20 August 2012 to their third child, Nina.

Maleeva has been very active with the environmental organization 'Gorichka.bg', which works to create public awareness about urgent environmental problems. She also has created 'Harmonica', a brand for organic foods, as well as a couple of organic food stores in Sofia under the brand 'Biomag '. She is also a partner at the Maleeva Tennis Club.

In October 2010, Maleeva won the Bulgarian national outdoor championship, becoming the youngest and the oldest player to have won it, within 22 years. In 2011, she made a brief tennis comeback, playing and winning three doubles matches for Bulgaria at the Fed Cup.

In March 2011, Maleeva was voted eighth in the "100 most influential women in Bulgaria" by Pari newspaper. She has also appeared at Wimbledon's ladies' invitation doubles event on several occasions, achieving her best result in 2015, where she partnered Rennae Stubbs; the pair defeated Navratilova and Selima Sfar in the final to win the title.

In February 2024, she was nominated as the captain of the Bulgarian BJK Cup team.

== Career statistics ==
=== Grand Slam performance timelines ===
Key
W	F	SF	QF	#R	RR	Q#	DNQ	A	NH

(W) winner; (F) finalist; (SF) semifinalist; (QF) quarterfinalist; (#R) rounds 4, 3, 2, 1; (RR) round-robin stage; (Q#) qualification round; (DNQ) did not qualify; (A) absent; (NH) not held; (SR) strike rate (events won / competed); (W–L) win–loss record.

==== Singles ====
Tournament	1989	1990	1991	1992	1993	1994	1995	1996	1997	1998	1999	2000	2001	2002	2003	2004	2005	SR	W-L	Win%
Australian Open	A	Q2	4R	1R	4R	4R	1R	A	A	1R	A	1R	1R	4R	3R	2R	3R	0 / 12	17–12	59%
French Open	Q1	3R	1R	3R	4R	1R	2R	4R	1R	A	1R	3R	1R	1R	4R	4R	2R	0 / 15	20–15	66%
Wimbledon	A	2R	1R	1R	3R	2R	A	2R	3R	A	A	2R	4R	4R	2R	4R	4R	0 / 13	21–13	62%
US Open	Q1	1R	2R	QF	4R	4R	2R	1R	3R	A	A	2R	2R	3R	1R	2R	2R	0 / 14	20–14	59%
Win–loss	0–0	3–3	4–4	6–4	11–4	7–4	2–3	4–3	4–3	0–1	0–1	4–4	4–4	8–4	6–4	8–4	7–4	0 / 54	78–54	59%

==== Doubles ====
Tournament	1990	1991	1992	1993	1994	1995	...	2000	2001	2002	2003	2004	2005	SR	W-L	Win%
Australian Open	A	1R	3R	2R	A	1R		A	3R	2R	1R	3R	A	0 / 8	8–8	50%
French Open	A	1R	1R	3R	1R	A		A	2R	A	1R	1R	A	0 / 7	3–7	30%
Wimbledon	A	1R	1R	3R	1R	A		A	1R	A	3R	A	A	0 / 6	4–6	40%
US Open	1R	1R	1R	1R	2R	A		1R	1R	A	QF	A	2R	0 / 9	5–9	36%
Win–loss	0–1	0–4	2–4	5–4	1–3	0–1		0–1	3–4	1–1	5–4	2–2	1–1	0 / 30	20–30	40%

== See also ==
- Manuela Maleeva
- Katerina Maleeva
- List of female tennis players
