= 1988 OTB Open – Women's singles =

Women's singles
- 1988 OTB Open

Final
- Champion: (United States) Gretchen Magers
- Runner-up: (United States) Terry Phelps
- Score: 7–6, 6–4

Details
- Draw: 32
- Seeds: 8

Events
Singles	men	women
Doubles	men	women
← 1987 ·	OTB Open	· 1989 →

Camille Benjamin was the defending champion but lost in the semifinals to Terry Phelps.

Gretchen Magers won in the final 7–6, 6–4 against Phelps.

== Seeds ==
A champion seed is indicated in bold text while text in italics indicates the round in which that seed was eliminated.

1. (United States) Elly Hakami (quarterfinals)
2. (United States) **Gretchen Magers (champion)**
3. (United States) Wendy White (second round)
4. (United States) Terry Phelps (final)
5. (United States) Ann Henricksson (first round)
6. (United States) Camille Benjamin (semifinals)
7. (United States) Lisa Bonder (first round)
8. (United States) Amy Frazier (first round)

== Draw ==
=== Key ===
- Q = Qualifier
- WC = Wild card
- LL = Lucky loser
- Alt = Alternate
- SE = Special exempt
- PR = Protected ranking
- ITF = ITF entry
- JE = Junior exempt
- w/o = Walkover
- r = Retired
- d = Defaulted
- SR = Special ranking

First round
1	(United States) **E Hakami**	**6**	**6**
(United States) M Quinlan	2	4
(United Kingdom) J Salmon	4	**7**	0
(Netherlands) **C Bakkum**	**6**	6	**6**
(United States) **B Herr**	4	**6**	**6**
(New Zealand) J Richardson	**6**	3	2
(United States) T Mochizuki	3	6
6	(United States) **C Benjamin**	**6**	**7**
4	(United States) **T Phelps**	3	**6**	**7**
(South Africa) L Barnard	**6**	0	5
(United States) **C Christian**	**7**	**6**
(United States) A Leand	5	1
(United States) **J Ingram**	**6**	**7**
(United States) M Brown	1	6
(United States) **R Reis**	**6**	**6**
7	(United States) L Bonder	4	3
5	(United States) A Henricksson	4	0
Q	(United States) **S Martin**	**6**	**6**
(United States) P Casale	**7**	6	3
(South Africa) **L Gregory**	5	**7**	**6**
(United States) C MacGregor	6	**6**	2
Q	(United States) **C Cunningham**	**7**	3	**6**
(United States) L Allen	**6**	6	4
3	(United States) **W White**	3	**7**	**6**
8	(United States) A Frazier	0	0
Q	(Poland) **R Baranski**	**6**	**6**
(United States) V Nelson-Dunbar	**6**	2	3
(Japan) **A Nishiya**	1	**6**	**6**
Q	(United States) **A Grossman**	**6**	**6**
(United Kingdom) V Lake	1	3
(United States) L Antonoplis	3	**6**	1
2	(United States) **G Magers**	**6**	4	**6**

Second round
1	(United States) **E Hakami**	**6**	**6**
(Netherlands) C Bakkum	4	4
(United States) B Herr	3	**6**	2
6	(United States) **C Benjamin**	**6**	4	**6**
4	(United States) **T Phelps**	**6**	**7**
(United States) C Christian	2	6
(United States) J Ingram	2	1
(United States) **R Reis**	**6**	**6**
Q	(United States) **S Martin**	2	**6**	**6**
(South Africa) L Gregory	**6**	2	1
Q	(United States) **C Cunningham**	**6**	**6**
3	(United States) W White	3	1
Q	(Poland) R Baranski	3	3
(Japan) **A Nishiya**	**6**	**6**
Q	(United States) A Grossman	4	3
2	(United States) **G Magers**	**6**	**6**

Quarterfinals
1	(United States) E Hakami	3	4
6	(United States) **C Benjamin**	**6**	**6**
4	(United States) **T Phelps**	**6**	**6**
(United States) R Reis	3	2
Q	(United States) **S Martin**	**6**	**6**
Q	(United States) C Cunningham	1	3
Q	(Japan) A Nishiya	6	0
2	(United States) **G Magers**	**7**	**6**

Semifinals
6	(United States) C Benjamin	3	3
4	(United States) **T Phelps**	**6**	**6**
Q	(United States) S Martin	2	6
2	(United States) **G Magers**	**6**	**7**

Final
4	(United States) Terry Phelps	6	4
2	(United States) **Gretchen Magers**	**7**	**6**
