= 1988 OTB Open – Women's doubles =

Women's doubles
- 1988 OTB Open
- 1987 Champions: (United States) Jenni Goodling (United States) Wendy Wood

Final
- Champions: (United States) Ann Henricksson (New Zealand) Julie Richardson
- Runners-up: (United States) Lea Antonoplis (United States) Cammy MacGregor
- Score: 6–3, 3–6, 7–5

Events
Singles	men	women
Doubles	men	women
← 1987 ·	OTB Open	· 1989 →

Jenni Goodling and Wendy Wood were the defending champions but did not compete that year.

Ann Henricksson and Julie Richardson won in the final 6–3, 3–6, 7–5 against Lea Antonoplis and Cammy MacGregor.

== Seeds ==
Champion seeds are indicated in bold text while text in italics indicates the round in which those seeds were eliminated.

1. (South Africa) Lise Gregory / (United States) Ronni Reis (semifinals)
2. (United States) Lea Antonoplis / (United States) Cammy MacGregor (final)
3. (United States) Elly Hakami / (United States) Gretchen Magers (quarterfinals)
4. (United States) Camille Benjamin / (United States) Wendy White (semifinals)

== Draw ==
=== Key ===
- Q = Qualifier
- WC = Wild card
- LL = Lucky loser
- Alt = Alternate
- SE = Special exempt
- PR = Protected ranking
- ITF = ITF entry
- JE = Junior exempt
- w/o = Walkover
- r = Retired
- d = Defaulted
- SR = Special ranking

First round
1	(South Africa) **L Gregory** (United States) **R Reis**	**7**	**6**
(United States) C Christian (United States) A Frazier	5	4
(United States) **T Phelps** (United States) **J Smoller**	**6**	**7**
(United States) L Allen (United States) B Herr	2	5
3	(United States) **E Hakami** (United States) **G Magers**	**6**	**7**
(France) S Amiach (United States) L Bobby	3	6
(Japan) A Nishiya (United States) S Norris	3	3
(United States) **A Henricksson** (New Zealand) **J Richardson**	**6**	**6**
(United States) T Mochizuki (United States) C Watson	1	2
(Poland) **R Baranski** (Australia) **C Thompson**	**6**	**6**
(South Africa) R Gaddie (South Africa) T Gaddie	3	4
4	(United States) **C Benjamin** (United States) **W White**	**6**	**6**
(United States) **J Thomas** (Brazil) **T Zambrzycki**	4	**6**	**6**
(United States) V Nelson-Dunbar (Australia) A Scott	**6**	3	4
(Netherlands) C Bakkum (United Kingdom) J Salmon	4	1
2	(United States) **L Antonoplis** (United States) **C MacGregor**	**6**	**6**

Quarterfinals
1	(South Africa) **L Gregory** (United States) **R Reis**	**7**	3	**6**
(United States) T Phelps (United States) J Smoller	5	**6**	0
3	(United States) E Hakami (United States) G Magers	2	5
(United States) **A Henricksson** (New Zealand) **J Richardson**	**6**	**7**
(Poland) R Baranski (Australia) C Thompson	3	2
4	(United States) **C Benjamin** (United States) **W White**	**6**	**6**
(United States) J Thomas (Brazil) T Zambrzycki	2	0
2	(United States) **L Antonoplis** (United States) **C MacGregor**	**6**	**6**

Semifinals
1	(South Africa) L Gregory (United States) R Reis	**6**	6	1
(United States) **A Henricksson** (New Zealand) **J Richardson**	3	**7**	**6**
4	(United States) C Benjamin (United States) W White	**6**	1	1
2	(United States) **L Antonoplis** (United States) **C MacGregor**	4	**6**	**6**

Final
(United States) **Ann Henricksson** (New Zealand) **Julie Richardson**	**6**	3	**7**
2	(United States) Lea Antonoplis (United States) Cammy MacGregor	3	**6**	5
