= Susan Gilchrist =

American tennis player

- Country (sports): United States
- Born: April 12, 1971 (age 53)
- Prize money: $25,411

Singles
- Career titles: 1 ITF
- Highest ranking: No. 302 (August 20, 1990)

Doubles
- Career titles: 6 ITF
- Highest ranking: No. 120 (November 7, 1994)

Grand Slam doubles results
- French Open: 1R (1994)
- US Open: 1R (1989)
Medal record
Universiade
| Gold medal – first place | 1991 Sheffield | Mixed doubles |

Susan Gilchrist (born April 12, 1971) is an American former professional tennis player. She is now an associate professor at the MD Anderson Cancer Center.

== Tennis career ==
Gilchrist, who grew up in Alabama, made her grand slam main draw debut at the 1989 US Open. She lost in the last qualifying round of the singles, but partnered with Audra Keller in the women's doubles main draw, where they lost in the opening round to eventual finalists Mary Joe Fernández and Pam Shriver.

From 1989 to 1993, Gilchrist played college tennis for the University of Texas at Austin (UT Austin). A four-time All-American in both singles and doubles, she was also named Southwest Conference Player of the Year on three occasions. In 1993 she was a member of UT Austin's NCAA Division I Tennis Championship winning team. During the final she upset higher ranked Stanford opponent Laxmi Poruri, then later in the doubles with Vickie Paynter won the match which secured the title. She and Paynter were the top ranking doubles pairing in college tennis.

While in college she competed in the occasional professional tournament and won the Lady Lake ITF event in 1992. As a doubles player she won six ITF titles and reached a best ranking of 120 in the world in 1994, her first full year on tour after college tennis. The 1994 season, which was her last in professional tennis, included two doubles quarter-finals in WTA Tour tournaments, at Houston and Prague, both with Vickie Paynter. They also featured in the main draw together at the 1994 French Open.
