= Philip Johnson (tennis) =

American tennis player

- Full name: Philip Johnson
- Country (sports): United States
- Born: September 11, 1964 (age 61)
- Plays: Right-handed
- Prize money: $72,135

Singles
- Career record: 8–15
- Career titles: 0
- Highest ranking: No. 135 (October 2, 1989)

Grand Slam singles results
- US Open: 3R (1989)

Philip Johnson (born September 11, 1964) is a former professional tennis player from the United States.

== Biography ==
Johnson, the son of a preacher, is originally from the small Georgia town of Tunnel Hill, in the mountains near the Tennessee border. He was a Georgian state champion as a junior and the top ranked 16s player in 1981.

Small in stature, Johnson learned to hit the ball with both hands and throughout his career used two-handed shots for both forehands and backhands.

In his second year at the University of Georgia he was a member of the 1985 NCAA Division I championship winning team, which was their first national title. His win over UCLA's Brett Greenwood in the tournament final secured the trophy. He was an All-American in 1986, then again when the University of Georgia won another team title in 1987, a year in which he also made it to number two in the singles rankings and earned selection for the USTA Junior Davis Cup team. On the professional tour he won two Challenger titles in the 1987 season, in back to back tournaments in South Africa, at Bloemfontein and Durban.

On both of his main draw appearances at the US Open he met Andre Agassi. The first occasion was in 1988 when he made it through qualifying, then had to face the then world number four in the first round. He managed to take Agassi to a tiebreak in the opening set but still lost in three. At the 1989 US Open he again entered the draw as a qualifier but on this occasion got past his first round opponent, with a straight sets win over Cássio Motta. He also won his second round match over Sweden's Anders Järryd, who had to retire hurt early in the second set, after losing the first. It was then, in the third round, that Johnson came up against Agassi, a match he lost in straight sets.

His best win on the Grand Prix/ATP tour came at the 1989 U.S. Pro Championships in Boston, where he upset a top ten player, Alberto Mancini, to make the round of 16. He had lost in qualifying and only got in the tournament as a lucky loser, but was able to defeat the third seeded Argentine 7–6, 6–2.

Following his playing career he worked for many years as a teaching professional at the Hixson Racquet Club in Chattanooga, Tennessee.

Since 2003 he has been the head coach of the tennis program at Baylor.

== Challenger titles ==
=== Singles: (2) ===
Year	Tournament	Surface	Opponent	Score
1987	Bloemfontein, South Africa	Hard	(United States) Mike Bauer	6–2, 6–4
1987	Durban, South Africa	Hard	(Israel) Tomer Zimmerman	6–2, 2–0 (RET)
