= Dan Goldberg (tennis) =

American tennis player

- Country (sports): United States
- Born: September 6, 1967 (age 58) Avon, Connecticut, U.S.
- Height: 6 ft 1 in (185 cm)
- Plays: Left-handed
- Prize money: $20,907

Singles
- Career record: 2–9
- Highest ranking: No. 276 (Aug 1, 1988)
Medal record
Maccabiah Games
| Bronze medal – third place | 1989 Tel Aviv | Men's Doubles |
| Bronze medal – third place | 1989 Tel Aviv | Mixed Doubles |

Dan Goldberg (born September 6, 1967) is an American former professional tennis player.

Goldberg, a left-handed player from Avon, Connecticut, played collegiate tennis in the late 1980s for the University of Michigan, where he was a three-time All-American and was named four times on the All-Big Ten team. As a sophomore in 1987 he reached the final of the NCAA singles championship, losing to Miami's Andrew Burrow. He was named Big Ten Athlete of the Year in 1988 and Big Ten Sportsman of the Year in 1989.

On the professional tour, Goldberg had a career high singles ranking of 276 in the world and was a quarter-finalist at the 1988 OTB Open in Schenectady, with wins over Jon Levine and Charles Beckman. In 1988 he also took a set off third seed and eventual runner-up Aaron Krickstein in a first round loss at the Detroit Grand Prix tournament.

He won two bronze medals, in the men's and mixed doubles, at the 1989 Maccabiah Games in Israel.

In 2024, Goldberg was in inducted into the University of Michigan Athletic Hall of Honor.
