= 1988 OTB Open – Men's doubles =

Men's doubles
- 1988 OTB Open

Final
- Champions: (West Germany) Alexander Mronz (United States) Greg Van Emburgh
- Runners-up: (United States) Paul Annacone (United States) Patrick McEnroe
- Score: 6–3, 6–7, 7–5

Details
- Draw: 16
- Seeds: 4

Events
Singles	men	women
Doubles	men	women
- OTB Open

Gary Donnelly and Gary Muller were the defending champions, but did not participate this year.

Alexander Mronz and Greg Van Emburgh won the title, defeating Paul Annacone and Patrick McEnroe 6–3, 6–7, 7–5 in the final.

== Seeds ==
1. (United States) Paul Annacone / (United States) Patrick McEnroe (final)
2. (United States) Paul Chamberlin / (United States) Larry Scott (quarterfinals)
3. (United States) Jon Levine / (Nigeria) Tony Mmoh (first round)
4. (United States) Mark Basham / (United States) Charles Beckman (semifinals)

== Draw ==
Key

- Q = Qualifier
- WC = Wild card
- LL = Lucky loser
- Alt = Alternate
- ITF = ITF entry
- PR = Protected ranking
- SR = Special ranking
- SE = Special exempt
- JE = Junior exempt
- JR = Junior Accelerator Programme entrant
- CO = College Accelerator Programme entrant
- NG = Next Gen Accelerator Program entrant
- w/o = Walkover
- r = Retired
- d = Defaulted

=== Draw ===
First round
1	(United States) P Annacone (United States) P McEnroe	6	6
(India) Z Ali (United States) M Kures	2	3
(Mexico) F Pérez Pascal (Puerto Rico) J Ríos	7	4	6
(United States) H Endelman (United States) J Sobel	6	6	7
4	(United States) M Basham (United States) C Beckman	4	6	6
(United States) J Barham (Mexico) L Lavalle	6	3	4
(Italy) G Pozzi (South Africa) M Robertson	6	6
(United States) Henry Somerville (United States) Jim Somerville	3	4
(Jamaica) D Burke (Canada) M Laurendeau	3	3
(United States) S DeVries (United States) R Matuszewski	6	6
(United States) M Bauer (United States) G Layendecker	7	6
3	(United States) J Levine (Nigeria) T Mmoh	6	4
WC	(United States) Scott Milener (United States) Peter van der Sommen	4	3
(West Germany) A Mronz (United States) G Van Emburgh	6	6
(United States) J Gurfein (United States) M Lee	2	6
2	(United States) P Chamberlin (United States) L Scott	6	7

Quarterfinals
1	(United States) P Annacone (United States) P McEnroe	6	6
(United States) H Endelman (United States) J Sobel	4	4
4	(United States) M Basham (United States) C Beckman	6	7
(Italy) G Pozzi (South Africa) M Robertson	4	6
(United States) S DeVries (United States) R Matuszewski	6	3	6
(United States) M Bauer (United States) G Layendecker	2	6	1
(West Germany) A Mronz (United States) G Van Emburgh	6	3	7
2	(United States) P Chamberlin (United States) L Scott	3	6	6

Semifinals
1	(United States) P Annacone (United States) P McEnroe	6	7	6
4	(United States) M Basham (United States) C Beckman	7	6	4
(United States) S DeVries (United States) R Matuszewski	3	7	6
(West Germany) A Mronz (United States) G Van Emburgh	6	5	7

Final
1	(United States) P Annacone (United States) P McEnroe	3	7	5
(West Germany) A Mronz (United States) G Van Emburgh	6	6	7
