= 1989 US Open – Women's doubles =

Women's doubles
- 1989 US Open

Final
- Champions: (Australia) Hana Mandlíková (United States) Martina Navratilova
- Runners-up: (United States) Mary Joe Fernández (United States) Pam Shriver
- Score: 5–7, 6–4, 6–4

Details
- Draw: 64
- Seeds: 16

Events
Singles	men	women		boys	girls
Doubles	men	women	mixed	boys	girls
WC Singles	men	women	quad
WC Doubles	men	women	quad
Legends	men	women	mixed
← 1988 ·	US Open	· 1990 →

Gigi Fernández and Robin White were the defending champions but lost in the quarterfinals to Steffi Graf and Gabriela Sabatini.

Hana Mandlíková and Martina Navratilova won in the final 5–7, 6–4, 6–4 against Mary Joe Fernández and Pam Shriver. Navratilova became the 1st player to win 30 Grand Slam titles in Women's Doubles, a record for the most grand slam titles in any single category for any player, male or female.

== Seeds ==
Champion seeds are indicated in bold text while text in italics indicates the round in which those seeds were eliminated.

1. (Czechoslovakia) Jana Novotná / (Czechoslovakia) Helena Suková (third round)
2. (Soviet Union) Larisa Savchenko / (Soviet Union) Natasha Zvereva (quarterfinals)
3. (United States) Katrina Adams / (United States) Zina Garrison (third round)
4. (United States) Patty Fendick / (Canada) Jill Hetherington (second round)
5. (United States) Mary Joe Fernández / (United States) Pam Shriver (final)
6. (Australia) **Hana Mandlíková** / (United States) **Martina Navratilova (champions)**
7. (United States) Gigi Fernández / (United States) Robin White (quarterfinals)
8. (Australia) Elizabeth Smylie / (Australia) Wendy Turnbull (second round)
9. (West Germany) Steffi Graf / (Argentina) Gabriela Sabatini (semifinals)
10. (France) Isabelle Demongeot / (France) Nathalie Tauziat (third round)
11. (United States) Elise Burgin / (United States) Rosalyn Fairbank (third round)
12. (Netherlands) Brenda Schultz / (Hungary) Andrea Temesvári (first round)
13. (Australia) Jenny Byrne / (Australia) Janine Thompson (quarterfinals)
14. (Netherlands) Manon Bollegraf / (Argentina) Mercedes Paz (second round)
15. (United States) Beth Herr / (United States) Candy Reynolds (first round)
16. (South Africa) Lise Gregory / (United States) Gretchen Magers (third round)

== Draw ==
=== Key ===
- Q = Qualifier
- WC = Wild card
- LL = Lucky loser
- Alt = Alternate
- SE = Special exempt
- PR = Protected ranking
- ITF = ITF entry
- JE = Junior exempt
- w/o = Walkover
- r = Retired
- d = Defaulted
- SR = Special ranking

=== Finals ===
Semifinals
9	(West Germany) Steffi Graf (Argentina) Gabriela Sabatini	1	5
6	(Australia) Hana Mandlíková (United States) Martina Navratilova	6	7
5	(United States) Mary Joe Fernández (United States) Pam Shriver	6^{4}	6	6
(Australia) Nicole Provis (South Africa) Elna Reinach	7^{7}	4	3

Final
6	(Australia) Hana Mandlíková (United States) Martina Navratilova	5	6	6
5	(United States) Mary Joe Fernández (United States) Pam Shriver	7	4	4

=== Top half ===
==== Section 1 ====
First round
1	(Czechoslovakia) J Novotná (Czechoslovakia) H Suková	6	6
(United Kingdom) J Holden (United Kingdom) C Pollard	1	4
(Sweden) C Lindqvist (United States) C MacGregor	7	6
(United States) E Hakami (Argentina) A Villagrán	5	4
(United States) S Collins (South Africa) D van Rensburg	2	6	5
(Soviet Union) N Medvedeva (Soviet Union) L Meskhi	6	3	7
(Hong Kong) P Hy (United States) M Werdel	0	3
9	(West Germany) S Graf (Argentina) G Sabatini	6	6
16	(South Africa) L Gregory (United States) G Magers	7^{7}	6
(United States) L McNeil (United States) J Smoller	6^{5}	2
(United States) S Birch (United States) M McGrath	6	6
(Argentina) F Labat (Italy) B Romanò	2	3
(United States) H Na (United States) J Thomas	2	6	5
(United States) T Phelps (Italy) R Reggi	6	2	7
(Australia) M Jaggard (Australia) K Radford	2	6	3
7	(United States) G Fernández (United States) R White	6	2	6

Second round
1	(Czechoslovakia) J Novotná (Czechoslovakia) H Suková	7^{7}	6
(Sweden) C Lindqvist (United States) C MacGregor	6^{4}	2
(Soviet Union) N Medvedeva (Soviet Union) L Meskhi	3	3
9	(West Germany) S Graf (Argentina) G Sabatini	6	6
16	(South Africa) L Gregory (United States) G Magers	6	6^{3}	6
(United States) S Birch (United States) M McGrath	4	7^{7}	1
(United States) T Phelps (Italy) R Reggi	3	6	3
7	(United States) G Fernández (United States) R White	6	4	6

Third round
1	(Czechoslovakia) J Novotná (Czechoslovakia) H Suková	4	4
9	(West Germany) S Graf (Argentina) G Sabatini	6	6
16	(South Africa) L Gregory (United States) G Magers	6^{5}	7	1
7	(United States) G Fernández (United States) R White	7^{7}	5	6

Quarterfinals
9	(West Germany) S Graf (Argentina) G Sabatini	7	6
7	(United States) G Fernández (United States) R White	5	2

==== Section 2 ====
First round
3	(United States) K Adams (United States) Z Garrison	6	6
(United States) M L Daniels (United States) W White	0	1
(Czechoslovakia) I Budařová (Czechoslovakia) R Rajchrtová	6	6^{3}	3
(United States) L Antonoplis (Australia) A Scott	2	7^{7}	6
(United States) H Cioffi (United States) A Frazier	2	2
(United States) R Casals (United States) S Walsh-Pete	6	6
(Australia) J-A Faull (Australia) R McQuillan	6	6^{9}	3
13	(Australia) J Byrne (Australia) J Thompson	1	7^{11}	6
11	(United States) E Burgin (United States) R Fairbank	7	6
(United Kingdom) J Salmon (United Kingdom) C Wood	5	3
(United Kingdom) J Durie (United States) K Rinaldi	3	6	6
(United States) L Allen (United States) B Bowes	6	1	3
(Bulgaria) K Maleeva (Bulgaria) M Maleeva	6	4	6
(Canada) C Bassett-Seguso (Socialist Federal Republic of Yugoslavia) M Seles	1	6	4
(United States) R Reis (United States) S Stafford	3	4
6	(Australia) H Mandlíková (United States) M Navratilova	6	6

Second round
3	(United States) K Adams (United States) Z Garrison	6	6
(United States) L Antonoplis (Australia) A Scott	3	3
(United States) R Casals (United States) S Walsh-Pete	1	1
13	(Australia) J Byrne (Australia) J Thompson	6	6
11	(United States) E Burgin (United States) R Fairbank	6	6
(United Kingdom) J Durie (United States) K Rinaldi	3	0
(Bulgaria) K Maleeva (Bulgaria) M Maleeva	2	1
6	(Australia) H Mandlíková (United States) M Navratilova	6	6

Third round
3	(United States) K Adams (United States) Z Garrison	6^{5}	1
13	(Australia) J Byrne (Australia) J Thompson	7^{7}	6
11	(United States) E Burgin (United States) R Fairbank	4	6^{3}
6	(Australia) H Mandlíková (United States) M Navratilova	6	7^{7}

Quarterfinals
13	(Australia) J Byrne (Australia) J Thompson	1	3
6	(Australia) H Mandlíková (United States) M Navratilova	6	6

=== Bottom half ===
==== Section 3 ====
First round
5	(United States) M J Fernández (United States) P Shriver	6	6
(United States) S Gilchrist (United States) A Keller	1	3
(Australia) A Minter (New Zealand) J Richardson	4	4
(United States) P Barg (United States) A Henricksson	6	6
(Italy) S Cecchini (Argentina) P Tarabini	5	0
(Sweden) M Lindström (United States) H Ludloff	7	6
(Peru) L Gildemeister (United States) P Louie-Harper	7^{7}	6
12	(Netherlands) B Schultz (Hungary) A Temesvári	6^{3}	0
10	(France) I Demongeot (France) N Tauziat	6	6
(Austria) B Paulus (Czechoslovakia) R Zrubáková	3	2
(Italy) L Ferrando (Socialist Federal Republic of Yugoslavia) S Goleš	6	6
(Argentina) B Fulco (Argentina) A Tiezzi	4	1
(United States) K Jordan (United States) B Nagelsen	6	6
(Poland) I Kuczyńska (West Germany) C Porwik	3	4
(United States) K Foxworth (United States) M Norwood	6	3	4
4	(United States) P Fendick (Canada) J Hetherington	4	6	6

Second round
5	(United States) M J Fernández (United States) P Shriver	6	6
(United States) P Barg (United States) A Henricksson	3	3
(Sweden) M Lindström (United States) H Ludloff	6	3	6
(Peru) L Gildemeister (United States) P Louie-Harper	4	6	2
10	(France) I Demongeot (France) N Tauziat	6	6
(Italy) L Ferrando (Socialist Federal Republic of Yugoslavia) S Goleš	3	3
(United States) K Jordan (United States) B Nagelsen	2	6	6
4	(United States) P Fendick (Canada) J Hetherington	6	4	4

Third round
5	(United States) M J Fernández (United States) P Shriver	6	6
(Sweden) M Lindström (United States) H Ludloff	3	2
10	(France) I Demongeot (France) N Tauziat	3	5
(United States) K Jordan (United States) B Nagelsen	6	7

Quarterfinals
5	(United States) M J Fernández (United States) P Shriver	7^{7}	6
(United States) K Jordan (United States) B Nagelsen	6^{4}	4

==== Section 4 ====
First round
8	(Australia) E Smylie (Australia) W Turnbull	6	6
(United Kingdom) A Hobbs (United States) A Smith	2	3
(France) S Amiach (United States) M Van Nostrand	5	5
(Australia) N Provis (South Africa) E Reinach	7	7
(Argentina) G Castro (Spain) C Martínez	1	4
(South Africa) L Barnard (Australia) L Field	6	6
(Denmark) T Scheuer-Larsen (France) C Tanvier	2	1
14	(Netherlands) M Bollegraf (Argentina) M Paz	6	6
15	(United States) B Herr (United States) C Reynolds	6^{4}	6	6^{4}
(Italy) C Caverzasio (France) N Herreman	7^{7}	1	7^{7}
(West Germany) E Pfaff (France) C Suire	6	6
(Netherlands) C Bakkum (Netherlands) N Jagerman	2	2
(Czechoslovakia) P Langrová (Czechoslovakia) J Pospíšilová	6	1	4
(Italy) L Garrone (Italy) L Golarsa	1	6	6
(Spain) A Sánchez Vicario (Austria) J Wiesner	2	3
2	(Soviet Union) L Savchenko (Soviet Union) N Zvereva	6	6

Second round
8	(Australia) E Smylie (Australia) W Turnbull	6^{5}	6^{5}
(Australia) N Provis (South Africa) E Reinach	7^{7}	7^{7}
(South Africa) L Barnard (Australia) L Field	6	6
14	(Netherlands) M Bollegraf (Argentina) M Paz	4	3
(Italy) C Caverzasio (France) N Herreman	3	4
(West Germany) E Pfaff (France) C Suire	6	6
(Italy) L Garrone (Italy) L Golarsa	1	2
2	(Soviet Union) L Savchenko (Soviet Union) N Zvereva	6	6

Third round
(Australia) N Provis (South Africa) E Reinach	6	6^{7}	7
(South Africa) L Barnard (Australia) L Field	2	7^{9}	5
(West Germany) E Pfaff (France) C Suire	7	2	2
2	(Soviet Union) L Savchenko (Soviet Union) N Zvereva	5	6	6

Quarterfinals
(Australia) N Provis (South Africa) E Reinach	2	6	7^{7}
2	(Soviet Union) L Savchenko (Soviet Union) N Zvereva	6	3	6^{4}
