= 1989 US Open – Men's singles =

Men's singles
- 1989 US Open

Final
- Champion: (West Germany) Boris Becker
- Runner-up: (Czechoslovakia) Ivan Lendl
- Score: 7–6^{(7–2)}, 1–6, 6–3, 7–6^{(7–4)}

Details
- Draw: 128
- Seeds: 16

Events
Singles	men	women		boys	girls
Doubles	men	women	mixed	boys	girls
WC Singles	men	women	quad
WC Doubles	men	women	quad
Legends	men	women	mixed
- US Open

Boris Becker defeated Ivan Lendl in the final, 7–6^{(7–2)}, 1–6, 6–3, 7–6^{(7–4)} to win the men's singles tennis title at the 1989 US Open. It was his first US Open title and fourth major title overall. Becker saved a match point en route to the title, against Derrick Rostagno in the second round by way of a lucky net cord. This was Lendl's eighth consecutive singles final at the US Open; he was the first man in the Open Era to finish runner-up five times at the same major.

Mats Wilander was the defending champion, but lost in the second round to Pete Sampras; Sampras would win the title the following year.

== Seeds ==
The seeded players are listed below. Boris Becker is the champion; others show the round in which they were eliminated.

1. (Czechoslovakia) Ivan Lendl (finalist)
2. (West Germany) Boris Becker (champion)
3. (Sweden) Stefan Edberg (fourth round)
4. (United States) John McEnroe (second round)
5. (Sweden) Mats Wilander (second round)
6. (United States) Andre Agassi (semifinalist)
7. (United States) Michael Chang (fourth round)
8. (United States) Brad Gilbert (first round)
9. (United States) Tim Mayotte (quarterfinalist)
10. (Argentina) Alberto Mancini (fourth round)
11. (United States) Jay Berger (quarterfinalist)
12. (Spain) Emilio Sánchez (third round)
13. (United States) Jimmy Connors (quarterfinalist)
14. (United States) Aaron Krickstein (semifinalist)
15. (West Germany) Carl-Uwe Steeb (third round)
16. (Soviet Union) Andrei Chesnokov (fourth round)

== Draw ==
Key

- Q = Qualifier
- WC = Wild card
- LL = Lucky loser
- Alt = Alternate
- ITF = ITF entry
- PR = Protected ranking
- SR = Special ranking
- SE = Special exempt
- JE = Junior exempt
- JR = Junior Accelerator Programme entrant
- CO = College Accelerator Programme entrant
- NG = Next Gen Accelerator Program entrant
- w/o = Walkover
- r = Retired
- d = Defaulted

=== Finals ===
Quarterfinals
1	(Czechoslovakia) Ivan Lendl	6	6	6
9	(United States) Tim Mayotte	4	0	1
13	(United States) Jimmy Connors	1	6	6	3	4
6	(United States) Andre Agassi	6	4	0	6	6
11	(United States) Jay Berger	6	4	2	0^{r}
14	(United States) Aaron Krickstein	3	6	6	1
(France) Yannick Noah	3	3	2
2	(West Germany) Boris Becker	6	6	6

Semifinals
1	(Czechoslovakia) Ivan Lendl	7	6	3	6
6	(United States) Andre Agassi	6	1	6	1
14	(United States) Aaron Krickstein	4	3	4
2	(West Germany) Boris Becker	6	6	6

Final
1	(Czechoslovakia) Ivan Lendl	6^{2}	6	3	6^{4}
2	(West Germany) Boris Becker	7^{7}	1	6	7^{7}

=== Top half ===
==== Section 1 ====
First round
1	(Czechoslovakia) I Lendl	6	7	6
(Uruguay) D Pérez	1	6	4
(Australia) J Fitzgerald	7	5	7	5	6
(Australia) M Kratzmann	6	7	6	7	4
(Sweden) J Svensson	6	6	2	6
(United States) J Courier	3	7	6	7
WC	(United States) J Palmer	7	7	6
(United States) J Arias	5	6	3
(West Germany) M Stich	5	2	6	6	4
(United States) J Tarango	7	6	4	1	6
(Italy) D Nargiso	4	4	6	1
(Canada) A Sznajder	6	6	4	6
(United States) M Davis	6	7	6
(United States) R Seguso	4	6	4
(Sweden) M Gustafsson	6	1	5	4
16	(Soviet Union) A Chesnokov	3	6	7	6

Second round
1	(Czechoslovakia) I Lendl	6	6	6
(Australia) J Fitzgerald	2	1	1
(United States) J Courier	6	6	6
WC	(United States) J Palmer	1	3	3
(United States) J Tarango	6	3	6	2	6
(Canada) A Sznajder	3	6	4	6	3
(United States) M Davis	6	3	3	2
16	(Soviet Union) A Chesnokov	1	6	6	6

Third round
1	(Czechoslovakia) I Lendl	6	6	6
(United States) J Courier	1	2	3
(United States) J Tarango	4	4	2
16	(Soviet Union) A Chesnokov	6	6	6

Fourth round
1	(Czechoslovakia) I Lendl	6	4	1	6	6
16	(Soviet Union) A Chesnokov	3	6	6	4	3

==== Section 2 ====
First round
9	(United States) T Mayotte	6	6	6
Q	(United States) M Flur	1	3	2
(South Africa) C van Rensburg	6	6	7
(Sweden) J Carlsson	2	2	5
(United States) L Duncan	6	6	6	6
(United States) J Kriek	7	3	2	1
WC	(United States) C Adams	3	5	6
(Haiti) R Agénor	6	7	7
(United States) G Layendecker	1	6	6	3	6
(South Africa) P Aldrich	6	4	4	6	7
Q	(United States) J Boytim	6	3	7	3	5
WC	(United States) M Washington	4	6	6	6	7
(Canada) M Laurendeau	6	4	6	3
(Sweden) T Högstedt	7	6	2	6
(United States) T Wilkison	5	3	2
7	(United States) M Chang	7	6	6

Second round
9	(United States) T Mayotte	6	6	7
(South Africa) C van Rensburg	2	2	6
(United States) L Duncan	4	3	4
(Haiti) R Agénor	6	6	6
(South Africa) P Aldrich	6	7	6
WC	(United States) M Washington	3	5	2
(Sweden) T Högstedt	1	3	3
7	(United States) M Chang	6	6	6

Third round
9	(United States) T Mayotte	6	7	6
(Haiti) R Agénor	1	6	3
(South Africa) P Aldrich	0	6	4
7	(United States) M Chang	6	7	6

Fourth round
9	(United States) T Mayotte	7	6	1	6
7	(United States) M Chang	5	1	6	3

==== Section 3 ====
First round
3	(Sweden) S Edberg	7	6	7
(Argentina) J Frana	6	2	5
Q	(South Africa) C Campbell	3	6	3	6	1
(Sweden) P Lundgren	6	4	6	3	6
(Spain) J Sánchez	7	7	6
(United States) P Chamberlin	6	6	3
(Czechoslovakia) M Šrejber	6	2	7	6
Q	(Israel) G Bloom	2	6	5	3
(Venezuela) N Pereira	6	1	6	6	4
(South Africa) D Visser	3	6	7	3	6
(Ecuador) A Gómez	6	6	6	7
(France) J-P Fleurian	7	3	2	6
Q	(United States) B Shelton	6	7	6
(France) J Potier	4	6	3
(Netherlands) Nijssen	2	1	2
13	(United States) Connors	6	6	6

Second round
3	(Sweden) S Edberg	6	6	6
(Sweden) P Lundgren	2	2	2
(Spain) J Sánchez	7	6	4	3
(Czechoslovakia) M Šrejber	6	7	6	6
(South Africa) D Visser	6	3	4	4
(Ecuador) A Gómez	3	6	6	6
Q	(United States) B Shelton	7	2	2	2
13	(United States) J Connors	6	6	6	6

Third round
3	(Sweden) S Edberg	6	1	6	6
(Czechoslovakia) M Šrejber	2	6	2	1
(Ecuador) A Gómez	1	6	2	0
13	(United States) J Connors	6	4	6	6

Fourth round
3	(Sweden) S Edberg	2	3	1
13	(United States) J Connors	6	6	6

==== Section 4 ====
First round
12	(Spain) E Sánchez	6	6	5	6
WC	(United States) D Leaycraft	4	2	7	2
(Australia) D Cahill	7	6	6
(United States) J Brown	5	1	2
WC	(United States) J Grabb	5	7	6	7
(Australia) J Stoltenberg	7	6	3	6
(Socialist Federal Republic of Yugoslavia) G Ivanišević	6	1	6	6
(Senegal) Y Doumbia	2	6	2	0
Q	(United States) P Johnson	6	7	6
(Brazil) C Motta	2	5	2
(Czechoslovakia) M Vajda	5	4	7	4
(Sweden) A Järryd	7	6	6	6
(South Africa) N Broad	6	7	6
(Netherlands) M Schapers	4	6	3
Q	(United States) R Weiss	3	6	0
6	(United States) A Agassi	6	7	6

Second round
12	(Spain) E Sánchez	6	6	6	6
(Australia) D Cahill	3	7	4	4
WC	(United States) J Grabb	6	6	6
(Socialist Federal Republic of Yugoslavia) G Ivanišević	1	4	2
Q	(United States) P Johnson	6	2
(Sweden) A Järryd	1	0^{r}
(South Africa) N Broad	3	2	3
6	(United States) A Agassi	6	6	6

Third round
12	(Spain) E Sánchez	6	3	6	7	4
WC	(United States) J Grabb	4	6	7	6	6
Q	(United States) P Johnson	1	5	2
6	(United States) A Agassi	6	7	6

Fourth round
WC	(United States) J Grabb	1	5	3
6	(United States) A Agassi	6	7	6

=== Bottom half ===
==== Section 5 ====
First round
5	(Sweden) M Wilander	6	6	6
(Austria) H Skoff	1	3	1
Q	(Mexico) A Moreno	3	7	4	1
(United States) P Sampras	6	5	6	6
(Japan) S Matsuoka	6	4	2
(United States) S Davis	7	6	6
(Peru) J Yzaga	6	4	6	6
(Socialist Federal Republic of Yugoslavia) S Živojinović	0	6	4	2
(United States) P Annacone	6	6	4	3
WC	(United States) K Flach	7	2	6	6
(Australia) C Limberger	7	5	7	2	2
WC	(United States) R Leach	5	7	6	6	6
(United States) R Reneberg	6	7	6
(Austria) A Antonitsch	4	6	4
(Soviet Union) A Cherkasov	3	6	2	2
11	(United States) J Berger	6	2	6	6

Second round
5	(Sweden) M Wilander	7	3	6	1	4
(United States) P Sampras	5	6	1	6	6
(United States) S Davis	2	1	0^{r}
(Peru) J Yzaga	6	6	0
WC	(United States) K Flach	6	6	6	6	6
WC	(United States) R Leach	1	7	7	4	2
(United States) R Reneberg	3	2	1
11	(United States) J Berger	6	6	6

Third round
(United States) P Sampras	4	6	6	6
(Peru) J Yzaga	6	4	3	2
WC	(United States) K Flach	7	6	2	3	4
11	(United States) J Berger	6	4	6	6	6

Fourth round
(United States) P Sampras	5	2	1
11	(United States) J Berger	7	6	6

==== Section 6 ====
First round
14	(United States) A Krickstein	6	6	6
(United States) R Matuszewski	3	2	4
(United States) J Pugh	7	6	5	3	6
(Australia) W Masur	5	4	7	6	7
(United States) L Shiras	6	2	6	4	6
(Spain) S Bruguera	1	6	3	6	4
(Soviet Union) A Volkov	6	7	6
Q	(United States) M Robertson	1	6	3
(Australia) B Drewett	1	4	4
(Canada) G Michibata	6	6	6
Q	(United States) R Schmidt	6	6	5	1	1
Q	(Puerto Rico) M Nido	1	3	7	6	6
(New Zealand) K Evernden	6	6	6	4
Q	(Netherlands) P Haarhuis	7	3	7	6
(France) É Winogradsky	1	4	4
4	(United States) J McEnroe	6	6	6

Second round
14	(United States) A Krickstein	2	6	7	6
(Australia) W Masur	6	4	6	3
(United States) L Shiras	2	4	4
(Soviet Union) A Volkov	6	6	6
(Canada) G Michibata	4	6	4	3
Q	(Puerto Rico) M Nido	6	4	6	6
Q	(Netherlands) P Haarhuis	6	4	6	7
4	(United States) J McEnroe	4	6	3	5

Third round
14	(United States) A Krickstein	3	3	6	6	6
(Soviet Union) A Volkov	6	6	4	2	3
Q	(Puerto Rico) M Nido	5	6	0
Q	(Netherlands) P Haarhuis	7	7	6

Fourth round
14	(United States) A Krickstein	6	6	7
Q	(Netherlands) P Haarhuis	2	4	5

==== Section 7 ====
First round
8	(United States) B Gilbert	6	6	6	3	2
(United States) T Witsken	4	7	4	6	6
(France) Y Noah	6	6	6
Q	(United States) J Rive	3	2	2
(France) O Delaître	7	7	6
(United States) D Cassidy	6	6	1
(Israel) A Mansdorf	3	6	6	6
Q	(Italy) G Pozzi	6	2	3	3
(Brazil) L Mattar	4	6	5
(United States) D Wheaton	6	7	7
(Argentina) M Jaite	7	6	6
(Argentina) G Pérez Roldán	5	3	1
(West Germany) E Jelen	6	6	2	6	2
Q	(Soviet Union) A Olhovskiy	4	4	6	7	6
Q	(United States) J Canter	6	6	3	3	3
10	(Argentina) A Mancini	3	2	6	6	6

Second round
(United States) T Witsken	2	3	4
(France) Y Noah	6	6	6
(France) O Delaître	3	4	6
(Israel) A Mansdorf	6	6	7
(United States) D Wheaton	2	2	5
(Argentina) M Jaite	6	6	7
Q	(Soviet Union) A Olhovskiy	7	6	5	6
10	(Argentina) A Mancini	6	7	7	7

Third round
(France) Y Noah	3	3	7	7	6
(Israel) A Mansdorf	6	6	6	5	2
(Argentina) M Jaite	5	6	1	4
10	(Argentina) A Mancini	7	3	6	6

Fourth round
(France) Y Noah	6	3	6	6	6
10	(Argentina) A Mancini	3	6	7	3	3

==== Section 8 ====
First round
15	(West Germany) C Steeb	7	6	6
(Argentina) H de la Peña	6	3	1
(Finland) O Rahnasto	6	5	4	6	6
(Italy) O Camporese	4	7	6	3	3
(Australia) J Frawley	3	6	5	4
(Netherlands) M Koevermans	6	3	7	6
(Sweden) M Pernfors	1	4	6	6	6
WC	(United States) S Bryan	6	6	2	1	1
(Mexico) L Lavalle	7	4	4	3
(Czechoslovakia) M Mečíř	6	6	6	6
(Australia) M Woodforde	6	6	5	6
(Spain) T Carbonell	0	2	7	2
(United States) D Rostagno	7	6	6
(India) R Krishnan	5	3	3
(United States) D Pate	1	3	1
2	(West Germany) B Becker	6	6	6

Second round
15	(West Germany) C Steeb	6	6	6
(Finland) O Rahnasto	2	3	3
(Netherlands) M Koevermans	2	4	2
(Sweden) M Pernfors	6	6	6
(Czechoslovakia) M Mečíř	6	6	7
(Australia) M Woodforde	3	0	6
(United States) D Rostagno	6	7^{7}	3	6^{6}	3
2	(West Germany) B Becker	1	6^{1}	6	7^{8}	6

Third round
15	(West Germany) C Steeb	5	6	5	4
(Sweden) M Pernfors	7	4	7	6
(Czechoslovakia) M Mečíř	4	6	4	3
2	(West Germany) B Becker	6	3	6	6

Fourth round
(Sweden) M Pernfors	7	3	2	1
2	(West Germany) B Becker	5	6	6	6

== Matches ==
=== Final ===
- September 10, 1989 – Boris Becker becomes the first German man to win the U.S. Open, defeating Ivan Lendl in the final. Lendl appears in his eighth straight U.S. Open final, which ties him with Bill Tilden for the all-time record.

=== Quarterfinals ===
- Agassi-Connors

Played on Stadium Court, National Tennis Center, Flushing Meadows, New York. Originally shown by USA Network with play by play commentators: Ted Robinson and Vitas Gerulaitis

Start	End	Duration
3:50pm EST	7:07pm EST	3 hours 17 minutes

- 19yr old Andre Agassi with long flowing hair and jean shorts wearing a Nike shirt playing with a Donnay racquet, being Coached by Nick Bollettieri.
- 37yr old Jimmy Connors with a white bandana around his neck wearing a Slazenger "Triangle" shirt playing with a Slazenger racquet.

After a solid opening set, Agassi loses the next two, with Connors winning the third 6–0. Agassi then has to save three break points to win the fourth set to tie the match. The fifth starts in Agassi's favor, breaking twice and jumping to a 5–1 lead, but Connors rallies back with a break to 5–4. Finally, with double match point, Agassi misses a backhand down the line, but then pulls off a backhand dropshot which Connors hits long.

=== Early rounds ===
- Down match point in his 2nd round match, Boris Becker benefits from a net-cord passing shot just out of the reach of Derrick Rostagno in his come-from-behind victory. Also on the stadium, qualifier Paul Haarhuis stuns number four seed John McEnroe in one of the biggest upsets in U.S. Open history. In the next match on the stadium court, 18-year old Pete Sampras upsets defending champion and number five seed Mats Wilander.

Preceded by 1989 Wimbledon Championships – Men's singles	Grand Slam men's singles	Succeeded by 1990 Australian Open – Men's singles
