= 1989 US Open – Men's doubles =

Men's doubles
- 1989 US Open

Final
- Champion: (United States) John McEnroe (Australia) Mark Woodforde
- Runner-up: (United States) Ken Flach (United States) Robert Seguso
- Score: 6–4, 4–6, 6–3, 6–3

Details
- Draw: 64
- Seeds: 16

Events
Singles	men	women		boys	girls
Doubles	men	women	mixed	boys	girls
WC Singles	men	women	quad
WC Doubles	men	women	quad
Legends	men	women	mixed
← 1988 ·	US Open	· 1990 →

The men's doubles tournament at the 1989 US Open was held from August 28 to September 10, 1989, on the outdoor hard courts of the USTA National Tennis Center in New York City, United States. John McEnroe and Mark Woodforde won the title, defeating Ken Flach and Robert Seguso in the final.

== Seeds ==
1. (United States) Rick Leach / (United States) Jim Pugh (quarterfinals)
2. (Australia) John Fitzgerald / (Sweden) Anders Järryd (semifinals)
3. (United States) Jim Grabb / (United States) Patrick McEnroe (second round)
4. (United States) Ken Flach / (United States) Robert Seguso (final)
5. (Spain) Sergio Casal / (Spain) Emilio Sánchez (second round)
6. (United States) Paul Annacone / (South Africa) Christo van Rensburg (semifinals)
7. (United States) John McEnroe / (Australia) Mark Woodforde (champions)
8. (Australia) Darren Cahill / (Australia) Mark Kratzmann (quarterfinals)
9. (South Africa) Pieter Aldrich / (South Africa) Danie Visser (second round)
10. (United States) Scott Davis / (United States) David Pate (third round)
11. (Czechoslovakia) Petr Korda / (Czechoslovakia) Tomáš Šmíd (third round)
12. (Mexico) Jorge Lozano / (United States) Todd Witsken (second round)
13. (United States) Jim Courier / (United States) Pete Sampras (first round)
14. (United Kingdom) Neil Broad / (Australia) Laurie Warder (first round)
15. (Australia) Brad Drewett / (Australia) Wally Masur (second round)
16. (Sweden) Ronnie Båthman / (Peru) Carlos di Laura (first round)

== Draw ==
=== Key ===
- Q = Qualifier
- WC = Wild card
- LL = Lucky loser
- Alt = Alternate
- ITF = ITF entry
- PR = Protected ranking
- SR = Special ranking
- SE = Special exempt
- JE = Junior exempt
- JR = Junior Accelerator Programme entrant
- CO = College Accelerator Programme entrant
- NG = Next Gen Accelerator Program entrant
- w/o = Walkover
- r = Retired
- d = Defaulted

=== Finals ===
Quarterfinals
1	(United States) Rick Leach (United States) Jim Pugh	6	6	4	6
7	(United States) John McEnroe (Australia) Mark Woodforde	4	7	6	7
(United States) Luke Jensen (United States) David Wheaton	4	6	2
6	(United States) Paul Annacone (South Africa) Christo van Rensburg	6	7	6
(United States) Glenn Layendecker (United States) Richey Reneberg	0	0	3
4	(United States) Ken Flach (United States) Robert Seguso	6	6	6
8	(Australia) Darren Cahill (Australia) Mark Kratzmann	6	6	6	3
2	(Australia) John Fitzgerald (Sweden) Anders Järryd	7	4	7	6

Semifinals
7	(United States) John McEnroe (Australia) Mark Woodforde	6	3	6	6
6	(United States) Paul Annacone (South Africa) Christo van Rensburg	3	6	3	3
4	(United States) Ken Flach (United States) Robert Seguso	6	6	7
2	(Australia) John Fitzgerald (Sweden) Anders Järryd	3	3	5

Final
7	(United States) John McEnroe (Australia) Mark Woodforde	6	4	6	6
4	(United States) Ken Flach (United States) Robert Seguso	4	6	3	3

=== Top half ===
==== Section 1 ====
First round
1	(United States) R Leach (United States) J Pugh	6	7	6
(United States) M De Palmer (United States) G Donnelly	7	6	2
(Netherlands) M Schapers (Czechoslovakia) M Šrejber	7	2	6
(United States) J Kriek (United States) T Wilkison	6	6	2
(United States) J Arias (United States) J Berger	2	3
(United States) S Cannon (United States) C Beckman	6	6
(France) O Delaître (Canada) M Laurendeau	7	3	6
15	(Australia) B Drewett (Australia) W Masur	6	6	7
9	(South Africa) P Aldrich (South Africa) D Visser	6	6
(United States) J Letts (United States) B Man-Son-Hing	3	1
(Brazil) C Motta (United States) B Willenborg	3	7	4
(Socialist Federal Republic of Yugoslavia) G Ivanišević (Italy) D Nargiso	6	6	6
(United States) J Palmer (United States) J Stark	4	2
(New Zealand) K Evernden (West Germany) CU Steeb	6	6
(United States) M Anger (United States) R Van't Hof	7	1	4
7	(United States) J McEnroe (Australia) M Woodforde	6	6	6

Second round
1	(United States) R Leach (United States) J Pugh	7	7
(Netherlands) M Schapers (Czechoslovakia) M Šrejber	6	5
(United States) S Cannon (United States) C Beckman	7	2	7
15	(Australia) B Drewett (Australia) W Masur	6	6	6
9	(South Africa) P Aldrich (South Africa) D Visser	4	6
(Socialist Federal Republic of Yugoslavia) G Ivanišević (Italy) D Nargiso	6	7
(New Zealand) K Evernden (West Germany) CU Steeb	3	3
7	(United States) J McEnroe (Australia) M Woodforde	6	6

Third round
1	(United States) R Leach (United States) J Pugh	6	6
(United States) S Cannon (United States) C Beckman	4	3
(Socialist Federal Republic of Yugoslavia) G Ivanišević (Italy) D Nargiso	5	3
7	(United States) J McEnroe (Australia) M Woodforde	7	6

Quarterfinals
1	(United States) R Leach (United States) J Pugh	6	6	4	6
7	(United States) J McEnroe (Australia) M Woodforde	4	7	6	7

==== Section 2 ====
First round
3	(United States) J Grabb (United States) P McEnroe	6	7	7
(Mexico) LE Herrera (Venezuela) A González Mora	7	6	6
(Canada) G Connell (Canada) G Michibata	5	7	4
(United States) L Jensen (United States) D Wheaton	7	6	6
(Ecuador) A Gómez (Venezuela) N Pereira	5	7	6
(Brazil) D Campos (Argentina) M Jaite	7	6	3
(Austria) A Antonitsch (United States) J Canter	6	6
13	(United States) J Courier (United States) P Sampras	4	4
11	(Czechoslovakia) P Korda (Czechoslovakia) T Šmíd	6	6	7
(United States) B MacPhie (United States) C Lothringer	7	4	5
(Sweden) M Pernfors (Sweden) T Svantesson	6	1
(United States) S DeVries (United States) R Matuszewski	7	6
(Israel) G Bloom (United States) B Pearce	7	6
(Argentina) H de la Peña (Socialist Federal Republic of Yugoslavia) S Živojinović	5	3
(Denmark) M Mortensen (Netherlands) T Nijssen	4	1
6	(United States) P Annacone (South Africa) C van Rensburg	6	6

Second round
3	(United States) J Grabb (United States) P McEnroe	6	6	5
(United States) L Jensen (United States) D Wheaton	7	3	7
(Ecuador) A Gómez (Venezuela) N Pereira	6	3	4
(Austria) A Antonitsch (United States) J Canter	3	6	6
11	(Czechoslovakia) P Korda (Czechoslovakia) T Šmíd	6	7
(United States) S DeVries (United States) R Matuszewski	4	5
(Israel) G Bloom (United States) B Pearce	3	6
6	(United States) P Annacone (South Africa) C van Rensburg	6	7

Third round
(United States) L Jensen (United States) D Wheaton	6	6
(Austria) A Antonitsch (United States) J Canter	4	2
11	(Czechoslovakia) P Korda (Czechoslovakia) T Šmíd	4	2
6	(United States) P Annacone (South Africa) C van Rensburg	6	6

Quarterfinals
(United States) L Jensen (United States) D Wheaton	4	6	2
6	(United States) P Annacone (South Africa) C van Rensburg	6	7	6

=== Bottom half ===
==== Section 3 ====
First round
5	(Spain) S Casal (Spain) E Sánchez	7	6	6
(United States) P Chamberlin (United States) L Shiras	6	7	3
(Mexico) A Moreno (Peru) J Yzaga	3	6
(United States) G Layendecker (United States) R Reneberg	6	7
(United States) P Galbraith (United States) B Garrow	6	6
(Netherlands) P Haarhuis (Netherlands) M Koevermans	3	2
(United States) E Korita (South Africa) B Talbot	6	4
12	(Mexico) J Lozano (United States) T Witsken	7	6
14	(United Kingdom) N Broad (Australia) L Warder	5	6	6
(Italy) O Camporese (Spain) J Sánchez	7	4	7
(United States) M Davis (United States) T Pawsat	6	6
(United Kingdom) J Bates (Sweden) P Lundgren	0	7	^{r}
(Sweden) M Gustafsson (Australia) T Woodbridge	3	6	4
(United States) T Nelson (Kenya) P Wekesa	6	3	6
(West Germany) E Jelen (West Germany) M Stich	6	3
4	(United States) K Flach (United States) R Seguso	7	6

Second round
5	(Spain) S Casal (Spain) E Sánchez	4	5
(United States) G Layendecker (United States) R Reneberg	6	7
(United States) P Galbraith (United States) B Garrow	7	6
12	(Mexico) J Lozano (United States) T Witsken	6	3
(Italy) O Camporese (Spain) J Sánchez	6	7
(United States) M Davis (United States) T Pawsat	4	6
(United States) T Nelson (Kenya) P Wekesa	6	6	3
4	(United States) K Flach (United States) R Seguso	7	4	6

Third round
(United States) G Layendecker (United States) R Reneberg	6	6
(United States) P Galbraith (United States) B Garrow	2	1
(Italy) O Camporese (Spain) J Sánchez	1	4
4	(United States) K Flach (United States) R Seguso	6	6

Quarterfinals
(United States) G Layendecker (United States) R Reneberg	0	0	3
4	(United States) K Flach (United States) R Seguso	6	6	6

==== Section 4 ====
First round
8	(Australia) D Cahill (Australia) M Kratzmann	4	6	6
(Finland) O Rahnasto (Soviet Union) A Volkov	6	3	2
(United States) J Rive (United States) G Van Emburgh	6	6
(Brazil) R Acioly (Brazil) L Mattar	4	4
(Soviet Union) A Olhovskiy (Austria) H Skoff	5	3
(United States) E Amend (Zimbabwe) B Black	7	6
(Nigeria) N Odizor (United States) P Williamson	4	6
10	(United States) S Davis (United States) D Pate	6	7
16	(Sweden) R Båthman (Peru) C di Laura	3	4
(France) JP Fleurian (The Bahamas) R Smith	6	6
(United States) K Jones (South Africa) S Kruger	4	4
(Spain) T Carbonell (Uruguay) D Pérez	6	6
(United Kingdom) A Castle (United States) D Rostagno	2	3
(Argentina) J Frana (Mexico) L Lavalle	6	6
(Iran) M Bahrami (France) E Winogradsky	5	4
2	(Australia) J Fitzgerald (Sweden) A Järryd	7	6

Second round
8	(Australia) D Cahill (Australia) M Kratzmann	7	6
(United States) J Rive (United States) G Van Emburgh	6	2
(United States) E Amend (Zimbabwe) B Black	6	3	2
10	(United States) S Davis (United States) D Pate	3	6	6
(France) JP Fleurian (The Bahamas) R Smith	6	6	6
(Spain) T Carbonell (Uruguay) D Pérez	4	7	4
(Argentina) J Frana (Mexico) L Lavalle	7	1	2
2	(Australia) J Fitzgerald (Sweden) A Järryd	5	6	6

Third round
8	(Australia) D Cahill (Australia) M Kratzmann	6	6
10	(United States) S Davis (United States) D Pate	3	4
(France) JP Fleurian (The Bahamas) R Smith	6	2	3
2	(Australia) J Fitzgerald (Sweden) A Järryd	4	6	6

Quarterfinals
8	(Australia) D Cahill (Australia) M Kratzmann	6	6	6	3
2	(Australia) J Fitzgerald (Sweden) A Järryd	7	4	7	6
