= 1989 US Open – Women's singles =

Women's singles
- 1989 US Open

Final
- Champion: (West Germany) Steffi Graf
- Runner-up: (United States) Martina Navratilova
- Score: 3–6, 7–5, 6–1

Details
- Draw: 128
- Seeds: 16

Events
Singles	men	women		boys	girls
Doubles	men	women	mixed	boys	girls
WC Singles	men	women	quad
WC Doubles	men	women	quad
Legends	men	women	mixed
← 1988 ·	US Open	· 1990 →

Defending champion Steffi Graf defeated Martina Navratilova in the final, 3–6, 7–5, 6–1 to win the women's singles tennis title at the 1989 US Open. It was her second US Open title and eighth major singles title overall.

This marked the final professional appearance of former world No. 1 and 18-time major champion Chris Evert. She lost to Zina Garrison in the quarterfinals. It was Evert's 54th quarterfinal at a major (in her 56th major played), an Open Era record. She reached the quarterfinals in all 19 US Opens she entered, 17 times reaching the semifinals or better, and winning the title six times.

Future two-time champion Monica Seles made her US Open debut, losing to Evert in the fourth round.

== Seeds ==
The seeded players are listed below. Steffi Graf is the champion; others show the round in which they were eliminated.

1. (West Germany) Steffi Graf (champion)
2. (United States) Martina Navratilova (runner-up)
3. (Argentina) Gabriela Sabatini (semifinalist)
4. (United States) Chris Evert (quarterfinalist)
5. (United States) Zina Garrison (semifinalist)
6. (Spain) Arantxa Sánchez Vicario (quarterfinalist)
7. (Bulgaria) Manuela Maleeva (quarterfinalist)
8. (Czechoslovakia) Helena Suková (quarterfinalist)
9. (United States) Pam Shriver (first round)
10. (United States) Mary Joe Fernández (first round)
11. (Czechoslovakia) Jana Novotná (second round)
12. (Socialist Federal Republic of Yugoslavia) Monica Seles (fourth round)
13. (Soviet Union) Natalia Zvereva (fourth round)
14. (Bulgaria) Katerina Maleeva (second round)
15. (Spain) Conchita Martínez (fourth round)
16. (Czechoslovakia) Hana Mandlíková (third round)

== Draw ==
=== Key ===
- Q = Qualifier
- WC = Wild card
- LL = Lucky loser
- Alt = Alternate
- ITF = ITF entry
- PR = Protected ranking
- SR = Special ranking
- SE = Special exempt
- JE = Junior exempt
- JR = Junior Accelerator Programme entrant
- CO = College Accelerator Programme entrant
- NG = Next Gen Accelerator Program entrant
- w/o = Walkover
- r = Retired
- d = Defaulted

=== Finals ===
Quarterfinals
1	(West Germany) Steffi Graf	6	6
8	(Czechoslovakia) Helena Suková	1	1
3	(Argentina) Gabriela Sabatini	3	6	6
6	(Spain) Arantxa Sánchez Vicario	6	4	1
5	(United States) Zina Garrison	7^{7}	6
4	(United States) Chris Evert	6^{1}	2
7	(Bulgaria) Manuela Maleeva	0	0
2	(United States) Martina Navratilova	6	6

Semifinals
1	(West Germany) Steffi Graf	3	6	6
3	(Argentina) Gabriela Sabatini	6	4	2
5	(United States) Zina Garrison	6^{4}	2
2	(United States) Martina Navratilova	7^{7}	6

Finals
1	(West Germany) Steffi Graf	3	7	6
2	(United States) Martina Navratilova	6	5	1

=== Top half ===
==== Section 1 ====
First round
1	(West Germany) Steffi Graf	6	6
(Japan) Etsuko Inoue	3	1
Q	(France) Nathalie Herreman	6	6
(West Germany) Claudia Kohde-Kilsch	4	0
(United States) Terry Phelps	2	6	6
(Austria) Judith Wiesner	6	2	4
(United States) Robin White	6	6
(United States) Amy Frazier	2	1
(Hungary) Andrea Temesvári	6	6
WC	(United States) Linda Harvey-Wild	1	4
LL	(Argentina) Florencia Labat	6	3	7^{7}
(Sweden) Catarina Lindqvist	1	6	6^{2}
(South Africa) Rosalyn Fairbank Nideffer	6	6
(United States) Mareen "Peanut" Louie Harper	3	4
14	(Bulgaria) Katerina Maleeva	6	6
(Belgium) Ann Devries	4	1

Second round
1	(West Germany) Graf	6	6
Q	(France) Herreman	1	1
(United States) Phelps	1	6	6
(United States) R. White	6	4	3
(Hungary) Temesvári	6	6
LL	(Argentina) Labat	2	1
(South Africa) Fairbank Nideffer	6	6^{2}	6
14	(Bulgaria) K. Maleeva	4	7^{7}	3

Third round
1	(West Germany) Graf	6	6
(United States) Phelps	1	1
(Hungary) Temesvári	6	4	3
(South Africa) Fairbank Nideffer	4	6	6

Fourth round
1	(West Germany) Graf	6	6
(South Africa) Fairbank Nideffer	4	0

==== Section 2 ====
First round
(Soviet Union) Larisa Savchenko Neiland	6	6
9	(United States) Pam Shriver	2	3
(Netherlands) Nicole Muns-Jagerman	6	6
(United States) Katrina Adams	4	1
(United States) Halle Cioffi	6	6
(Australia) Rachel McQuillan	0	1
(Canada) Jill Hetherington	6	6
(Italy) Anna-Maria Cecchini	0	3
(United States) Beverly Bowes	6	6
(Canada) Rene Simpson	4	3
(Australia) Anne Minter	6	6
(France) Catherine Tanvier	2	3
(United States) Gretchen Magers	6	6
(Canada) Carling Bassett-Seguso	1	2
8	(Czechoslovakia) Helena Suková	6	6
(Czechoslovakia) Petra Langrová	3	4

Second round
(Soviet Union) Savchenko Neiland	1	7	6
(Netherlands) Jagerman	6	5	1
(United States) Cioffi	6	6
(Canada) Hetherington	2	4
(United States) Bowes	4	2
(Australia) Minter	6	6
(United States) Magers	2	7^{7}	2
8	(Czechoslovakia) Suková	6	6^{3}	6

Third round
(Soviet Union) Savchenko Neiland	3	6	6
(United States) Cioffi	6	3	1
(Australia) Minter	6	2	1
8	(Czechoslovakia) Suková	1	6	6

Fourth round
(Soviet Union) Savchenko Neiland	6	1	2
8	(Czechoslovakia) Suková	4	6	6

==== Section 3 ====
First round
3	(Argentina) Gabriela Sabatini	6	6
(West Germany) Claudia Porwik	1	2
(Italy) Cathy Caverzasio	6	6
WC	(United States) Mary Lou Daniels	3	4
(United States) Betsy Nagelsen	5	6	6
(Italy) Raffaella Reggi	7	4	3
(Soviet Union) Leila Meskhi	6	7^{7}
(France) Karine Quentrec	2	6^{5}
(Peru) Laura Gildemeister	7^{7}	7
(Australia) Nicole Provis	6^{5}	5
(West Germany) Sylvia Hanika	6	7^{7}
(Australia) Louise Field	4	6^{2}
Q	(France) Sophie Amiach	6	6
(United States) Hu Na	2	3
15	(Spain) Conchita Martínez	6	6
WC	(United States) Sandra Birch	3	2

Second round
3	(Argentina) Sabatini	6	6
(Italy) Caverzasio	3	2
(United States) Nagelsen	3	1
(Soviet Union) Meskhi	6	6
(Peru) Gildemeister	2	4
(West Germany) Hanika	6	6
Q	(France) Amiach	3	4
15	(Spain) Martínez	6	6

Third round
3	(Argentina) Sabatini	6	6
(Soviet Union) Meskhi	2	0
(West Germany) Hanika	5	1
15	(Spain) Martínez	7	6

Fourth round
3	(Argentina) Sabatini	6	6
15	(Spain) Martínez	1	1

==== Section 4 ====
First round
11	(Czechoslovakia) Jana Novotná	7	6
(United States) Meredith McGrath	5	2
(Austria) Barbara Paulus	6	7
(Italy) Laura Lapi	3	5
(United States) Susan Sloane	6	7
(Italy) Laura Garrone	2	5
(Netherlands) Manon Bollegraf	6	2	6
(United States) Molly Van Nostrand	2	6	4
Q	(United States) Laxmi Poruri	6^{10}	6	6
(United States) Carrie Cunningham	7^{12}	3	1
(Belgium) Sandra Wasserman	7^{7}	2
(Canada) Helen Kelesi	6^{1}	0	r
(United States) Cammy MacGregor	6	3	7^{8}
(Czechoslovakia) Jana Pospíšilová	2	6	6^{6}
6	(Spain) Arantxa Sánchez Vicario	6	6
(Australia) Jo-Anne Faull	3	1

Second round
11	(Czechoslovakia) Novotná	6	3	2
(Austria) Paulus	3	6	6
(United States) Sloane	6	6
(Netherlands) Bollegraf	4	2
Q	(United States) Poruri	1	4
(Belgium) Wasserman	6	6
(United States) Macgregor	1	3
6	(Spain) Sánchez Vicario	6	6

Third round
(Austria) Paulus	6	4	6
(United States) Sloane	4	6	2
(Belgium) Wasserman	1	6	4
6	(Spain) Sánchez Vicario	6	2	6

Fourth round
(Austria) Paulus	2	2
6	(Spain) Sánchez Vicario	6	6

=== Bottom half ===
==== Section 5 ====
First round
5	(United States) Zina Garrison	6	6
(Czechoslovakia) Radomira Zrubáková	2	1
(United States) Gigi Fernández	6	6
(South Africa) Amanda Coetzer	3	3
(Australia) Elizabeth Sayers Smylie	7	6
(Japan) Kumiko Okamoto	5	3
(United States) Patty Fendick	6	6
(Australia) Janine Tremelling	1	4
(Denmark) Tine Scheuer-Larsen	6	6^{5}	7^{7}
(United States) Louise Allen	4	7^{7}	6^{0}
(United States) Donna Faber	6	6
(Australia) Jenny Byrne	1	0
(Italy) Laura Golarsa	6	6
(Italy) Barbara Romanò	4	4
16	(Czechoslovakia) Hana Mandlíková	6	4	7^{7}
(West Germany) Eva Pfaff	1	6	6^{0}

Second round
5	(United States) Garrison	7	6
(United States) G Fernández	5	4
(Australia) Sayers Smylie	6	2	4
(United States) Fendick	3	6	6
(Denmark) Scheuer-Larsen	3	0
(United States) Faber	6	6
(Italy) Golarsa	6^{0}	6	1
16	(Czechoslovakia) Mandlíková	7^{7}	0	6

Third round
5	(United States) Garrison	6	7
(United States) Fendick	3	5
(United States) Faber	6	3	6
16	(Czechoslovakia) Mandlíková	2	6	1

Fourth round
5	(United States) Garrison	6	7^{7}
(United States) Faber	4	6^{4}

==== Section 6 ====
First round
12	(Socialist Federal Republic of Yugoslavia) Monica Seles	4	6	6
(United States) Ann Henricksson	6	2	2
(United States) Anne Smith	6	6
(Japan) Kimiko Date	3	0
(United States) Stacey Martin	6	6
(Argentina) Mercedes Paz	2	3
(United States) Shaun Stafford	6	6
WC	(United States) Kim Kessaris	2	3
(Argentina) Patricia Tarabini	7	6
(Netherlands) Brenda Schultz	5	2
(Greece) Angeliki Kanellopoulou	6	1	6
(United Kingdom) Sara Gomer	4	6	3
(United States) Elise Burgin	7	6
(United States) Lori McNeil	5	4
4	(United States) Chris Evert	6	6
(Argentina) Bettina Fulco	4	2

Second round
12	(Socialist Federal Republic of Yugoslavia) Seles	7	6
(United States) Smith	5	2
(United States) Martin	7	4	4
(United States) Stafford	5	6	6
(Argentina) Tarabini	6	6
(Greece) Kanellopoulou	2	3
(United States) Burgin	4	1
4	(United States) Evert	6	6

Third round
12	(Socialist Federal Republic of Yugoslavia) Seles	7^{7}	6
(United States) Stafford	6^{3}	2
(Argentina) Tarabini	2	4
4	(United States) Evert	6	6

Fourth round
12	(Socialist Federal Republic of Yugoslavia) Seles	0	2
4	(United States) Evert	6	6

==== Section 7 ====
First round
7	(Bulgaria) Manuela Maleeva	6	6
(United States) Marianne Werdel	4	3
(West Germany) Isabel Cueto	6	7
Q	(United States) Lisa Raymond	4	5
(United States) Kathy Rinaldi	7	6
(United Kingdom) Jo Durie	5	3
(France) Nathalie Tauziat	6	6
WC	(United States) Andrea Farley	1	3
WC	(United States) Tami Whitlinger	6	6
WC	(United States) Jennifer Santrock	0	4
WC	(United States) Beth Herr	6	6
(Japan) Akiko Kijimuta	2	0
(Italy) Linda Ferrando	6	7
(France) Isabelle Demongeot	0	5
13	(Soviet Union) Natalia Zvereva	1	6	7^{7}
Q	(France) Pascale Paradis	6	4	6^{5}

Second round
7	(Bulgaria) M. Maleeva	5	6	5
(West Germany) Cueto	7	3	3^{r}
(United States) Rinaldi	2	1
(France) Tauziat	6	6
WC	(United States) Whitlinger	6	6
WC	(United States) Herr	3	0
(Italy) Ferrando	3	4
13	(Soviet Union) Zvereva	6	6

Third round
7	(Bulgaria) M. Maleeva	6	6
(France) Tauziat	1	3
WC	(United States) Whitlinger	0	2
13	(Soviet Union) Zvereva	6	6

Fourth round
7	(Bulgaria) M. Maleeva	6	6
13	(Soviet Union) Zvereva	2	0

==== Section 8 ====
First round
(United States) Wendy White	6	6
10	(United States) Mary Joe Fernández	4	3
(Czechoslovakia) Regina Rajchrtová	6	7^{7}
(Switzerland) Eva Krapl	3	6^{5}
(United States) Ann Grossman	6	6
(South Africa) Dianne Van Rensburg	4	1
(United States) Camille Benjamin	6	6
(Brazil) Andrea Vieira	2	2
(South Africa) Elna Reinach	7	6
Q	(United States) Sandy Collins	5	2
(Socialist Federal Republic of Yugoslavia) Sabrina Goleš	6	7
(United States) Ronni Reis	3	5
Q	(France) Julie Halard	6	7^{7}
(West Germany) Martina Pawlik	2	6^{4}
2	(United States) Martina Navratilova	6	6
Q	(Japan) Ei Iida	0	2

Second round
(United States) W. White	6	2	4
(Czechoslovakia) Rajchrtová	2	6	6
(United States) Grossman	2	6	3
(United States) Benjamin	6	1	6
(South Africa) Reinach	3	4
(Socialist Federal Republic of Yugoslavia) Goleš	6	6
Q	(France) Halard	1	0
2	(United States) Navratilova	6	6

Third round
(Czechoslovakia) Rajchrtová	2	6	6
(United States) Benjamin	6	3	2
(Socialist Federal Republic of Yugoslavia) Goleš	4	0
2	(United States) Navratilova	6	6

Fourth round
(Czechoslovakia) Rajchrtová	2	0
2	(United States) Navratilova	6	6

== Match summaries ==
=== Early rounds ===
- Sept 3, 1989 – Chris Evert defeats a 15-year-old Monica Seles for her 101st and last U.S. Open singles victory.
- Sept 5, 1989 – Chris Evert is defeated by Zina Garrison in Evert's last U.S. Open match.

Preceded by 1989 Wimbledon Championships – Women's singles	Grand Slam women's singles	Succeeded by 1990 Australian Open – Women's singles
