= 1989 US Open – Mixed doubles =

Mixed doubles
- 1989 US Open
- 1988 Champions: (Czechoslovakia) Jana Novotná (United States) Jim Pugh

Final
- Champions: (United States) Robin White (United States) Shelby Cannon
- Runners-up: (United States) Meredith McGrath (United States) Rick Leach
- Score: 3–6, 6–2, 7–5

Details
- Draw: 32
- Seeds: 8

Events
Singles	men	women		boys	girls
Doubles	men	women	mixed	boys	girls
WC Singles	men	women	quad
WC Doubles	men	women	quad
Legends	men	women	mixed
- US Open

Jana Novotná and Jim Pugh were the defending champions but lost in the second round to Zina Garrison and Sherwood Stewart.

Robin White and Shelby Cannon won in the final 3–6, 6–2, 7–5 against Meredith McGrath and Rick Leach.

== Seeds ==
Champion seeds are indicated in bold text while text in italics indicates the round in which those seeds were eliminated.

1. (Czechoslovakia) Jana Novotná / (United States) Jim Pugh (second round)
2. n/a
3. (Soviet Union) Natasha Zvereva / (United States) Patrick McEnroe (second round)
4. (Australia) Elizabeth Smylie / (Australia) John Fitzgerald (second round)
5. (United States) Patty Fendick / (United States) Scott Davis (second round)
6. (United States) Rosalyn Fairbank-Nideffer / (South Africa) Danie Visser (second round)
7. (United States) Gigi Fernández / (Mexico) Jorge Lozano (first round)
8. (South Africa) Elna Reinach / (South Africa) Pieter Aldrich (semifinals)

== Draw ==
Key

- Q = Qualifier
- WC = Wild card
- LL = Lucky loser
- Alt = Alternate
- ITF = ITF entry
- PR = Protected ranking
- SR = Special ranking
- SE = Special exempt
- JE = Junior exempt
- JR = Junior Accelerator Programme entrant
- CO = College Accelerator Programme entrant
- NG = Next Gen Accelerator Program entrant
- w/o = Walkover
- r = Retired
- d = Defaulted

=== Final ===
Final
(United States) **Robin White** (United States) **Shelby Cannon**	3	**6**	**7**
(United States) Meredith McGrath (United States) Rick Leach	**6**	2	5

=== Top half ===
First round
1	(Czechoslovakia) **J Novotná** (United States) **J Pugh**	**6**	**7**
(United States) J Santrock (United States) D Stockton	4	6
(United States) **Z Garrison** (United States) **S Stewart**	**6**	**6**
(United States) P Barg (United States) B Willenborg	4	4
(United States) **E Burgin** (United States) **L Shiras**	**6**	**6**
(United States) S McCarthy (United States) L Jensen	2	3
(South Africa) D van Rensburg (South Africa) N Broad	3	**7**	4
8	(South Africa) **E Reinach** (South Africa) **P Aldrich**	**6**	5	**6**
4	(Australia) **E Smylie** (Australia) **J Fitzgerald**	**6**	3
(United States) B Herr (United States) T Pawsat	4	0	r
(United States) G Magers (Iran) M Bahrami	1	4
(Australia) **J Tremelling** (Australia) **B Drewett**	**6**	**6**
(Australia) W Turnbull (United Kingdom) J Lloyd	6	5
(United States) **R White** (United States) **S Cannon**	**7**	**7**
(France) S Amiach (United States) R Van't Hof	3	6
5	(United States) **P Fendick** (United States) **S Davis**	**6**	**7**

Second round
1	(Czechoslovakia) J Novotná (United States) J Pugh	5	**7**	4
(United States) **Z Garrison** (United States) **S Stewart**	**7**	6	**6**
(United States) E Burgin (United States) L Shiras	3	**6**	1
8	(South Africa) **E Reinach** (South Africa) **P Aldrich**	**6**	4	**6**
4	(Australia) E Smylie (Australia) J Fitzgerald	5	**6**	2
(Australia) **J Tremelling** (Australia) **B Drewett**	**7**	2	**6**
(United States) **R White** (United States) **S Cannon**	**6**	**7**
5	(United States) P Fendick (United States) S Davis	4	5

Quarterfinals
(United States) Z Garrison (United States) S Stewart	6	3
8	(South Africa) **E Reinach** (South Africa) **P Aldrich**	**7**	**6**
(Australia) J Tremelling (Australia) B Drewett	6	2
(United States) **R White** (United States) **S Cannon**	**7**	**6**

Semifinals
8	(South Africa) E Reinach (South Africa) P Aldrich	4	6
(United States) **R White** (United States) **S Cannon**	**6**	**7**

=== Bottom half ===
First round
6	(United States) **R Fairbank-Nideffer** (South Africa) **D Visser**	**7**	2	**6**
(Australia) J Byrne (Australia) M Kratzmann	6	**6**	3
(United States) T Phelps (Australia) M Woodforde	3	**7**	2
(Netherlands) **M Bollegraf** (Netherlands) **T Nijssen**	**6**	5	**6**
WC	(Soviet Union) O Morozova (Soviet Union) A Metreveli	0	1
(United States) **M J Fernández** (United States) **D Wheaton**	**6**	**6**
(United States) A Grossman (United States) J Palmer	4	6
3	(Soviet Union) **N Zvereva** (United States) **P McEnroe**	**6**	**7**
7	(United States) G Fernández (Mexico) J Lozano	3	6
(Spain) **A Sánchez Vicario** (Spain) **J Sánchez**	**6**	**7**
(United States) **M McGrath** (United States) **R Leach**	**6**	**6**
(Australia) N Provis (Australia) D Cahill	3	3
(United States) **B Nagelsen** (Sweden) **R Båthman**	**6**	**6**
(United Kingdom) J Durie (Australia) L Warder	4	4
(United States) **A Smith** (United States) **K Flach**	**6**	**6**
ALT	(United States) C Reynolds (United States) S DeVries	3	3

Second round
6	(United States) R Fairbank-Nideffer (South Africa) D Visser	**7**	4	2
(Netherlands) **M Bollegraf** (Netherlands) **T Nijssen**	5	**6**	**6**
(United States) **M J Fernández** (United States) **D Wheaton**	**7**	1	**6**
3	(Soviet Union) N Zvereva (United States) P McEnroe	6	**6**	4
(Spain) A Sánchez Vicario (Spain) J Sánchez	2	4
(United States) **M McGrath** (United States) **R Leach**	**6**	**6**
(United States) **B Nagelsen** (Sweden) **R Båthman**	4	**7**	**7**
(United States) A Smith (United States) K Flach	**6**	5	5

Quarterfinals
(Netherlands) **M Bollegraf** (Netherlands) **T Nijssen**	**6**	**6**
(United States) M J Fernández (United States) D Wheaton	4	3
(United States) **M McGrath** (United States) **R Leach**	1	**6**	**6**
(United States) B Nagelsen (Sweden) R Båthman	**6**	1	4

Semifinals
(Netherlands) M Bollegraf (Netherlands) T Nijssen	**7**	5	4
(United States) **M McGrath** (United States) **R Leach**	6	**7**	**6**
