= Sandra Birch =

American tennis player

- Full name: Sandra Birch-Krusos
- Country (sports): United States
- Born: September 3, 1969 (age 56) Bolton, England
- Height: 5 ft 6 in (1.68 m)
- Plays: Right-handed
- College: Stanford
- Prize money: $30,201

Singles
- Highest ranking: No. 187 (September 11, 1989)

Grand Slam singles results
- US Open: 1R (1989, 1991)

Doubles
- Highest ranking: No. 163 (September 11, 1989)

Grand Slam doubles results
- US Open: 2R (1989)

Sandra Birch-Krusos (born September 3, 1969) is a former professional tennis player from the United States. She is a member of the Stanford Athletic Hall of Fame.

== Biography ==
Birch, who was raised in Huntington Bay on Long Island, was runner-up to Natasha Zvereva in the girls' singles at the 1987 US Open.

From 1988 to 1991, she played collegiate tennis for Stanford University and was a member of the championship winning teams in each of those four seasons. She was a two-time NCAA Division I singles champion. In 1989, she beat Jennifer Santrock to win her first singles championship, and she was runner-up in the doubles. Her second championship was won in 1991 as a senior, over Lisa Albano in the final. While at Stanford, she won the Honda Sports Award as the nation's best female tennis player in 1991.

Both championship wins earned her a wildcard into the US Open main draw. She was beaten in the first round by Conchita Martínez in 1989 and Manuela Maleeva in 1991.

While at Stanford, she competed in several WTA Tour professional tournaments, most notably the 1989 OTB Open held in Schenectady, where she was a singles quarterfinalist and runner-up in the doubles with Debbie Graham.

== WTA Tour finals ==
=== Doubles (0-1) ===
Result	Date	Tournament	Tier	Surface	Partner	Opponents	Score
Loss	Jul 1989	Schenectady, U.S.	Category 1	Hard	(United States) Debbie Graham	(Australia) Michelle Jaggard (United States) Hu Na	3–6, 2–6
