= 1988 OTB Open =

- Date: July 18–24
- Edition: 2nd
- Surface: Hard / outdoor
- Location: Schenectady, New York, U.S.

Champions

Men's singles
- (United States) Tim Mayotte

Women's singles
- (United States) Gretchen Magers

Men's doubles
- (West Germany) Alexander Mronz / (United States) Greg Van Emburgh

Women's doubles
- (United States) Ann Henricksson / (New Zealand) Julie Richardson
- OTB Open

The 1988 OTB Open was a combined men's and women's tennis tournament played on outdoor hard courts in Schenectady, New York in the United States that was part of the 1988 Nabisco Grand Prix and of the Category 1 tier of the 1988 WTA Tour. It was the second edition of the tournament and ran from July 18 through July 24, 1988. Tim Mayotte and Gretchen Magers won the singles titles.

== Finals ==
=== Men's singles ===
(United States) Tim Mayotte defeated (United States) Johan Kriek 5–7, 6–3, 6–2

- It was Mayotte's 2nd title of the year and the 10th of his career.

=== Women's singles ===
(United States) Gretchen Magers defeated (United States) Terry Phelps 7–6, 6–4

- It was Magers' only title of the year and the 2nd of her career.

=== Men's doubles ===
(West Germany) Alexander Mronz / (United States) Greg Van Emburgh defeated (United States) Paul Annacone / (United States) Patrick McEnroe 6–3, 6–7, 7–5

- It was Mronz's only title of the year and the 1st of his career. It was Van Emburgh's only title of the year and the 1st of his career.

=== Women's doubles ===
(United States) Ann Henricksson / (New Zealand) Julie Richardson defeated (United States) Lea Antonoplis / (United States) Cammy MacGregor 6–3, 3–6, 7–5

- It was Henricksson's 3rd title of the year and the 3rd of her career. It was Richardson's only title of the year and the 5th of her career.
