= Lisa Green (tennis) =

American tennis player

- Full name: Lisa Green Swenson
- Country (sports): United States
- Born: July 18, 1968 (age 57)
- Prize money: $26,401

Singles
- Highest ranking: No. 197 (November 7, 1988)

Grand Slam singles results
- US Open: 1R (1988)

Lisa Green Swenson (born July 18, 1968) is an American former professional tennis player.

Green was a member of the Stanford tennis team of the late 1980s and early 1990s which dominated the NCAA championships and as a senior served as team captain. A San Jose local, she was a four-time All-American and an NCAA individual semi-finalist.

On the professional tour she reached a career high singles ranking of 197 in the world and most notably qualified for the main draw of the 1988 US Open. Amongst her WTA Tour appearances she made the second round of the 1990 Canadian Open.

== ITF finals ==
=== Singles: 1 (0–1) ===
Outcome	Date	Tournament	Surface	Opponent	Score
Runner–up	July 19, 1987	Fayetteville, U.S.	Hard	(United States) Jane Thomas	2–6, 0–6
