= 1989 US Open (tennis) =

- Date: August 28 – September 10
- Edition: 109th
- Category: Grand Slam (ITF)
- Surface: Hardcourt
- Location: New York City, United States

Champions

Men's singles
- (West Germany) Boris Becker

Women's singles
- (West Germany) Steffi Graf

Men's doubles
- (United States) John McEnroe / (Australia) Mark Woodforde

Women's doubles
- (Australia) Hana Mandlíková / (United States) Martina Navratilova

Mixed doubles
- (United States) Robin White / (United States) Shelby Cannon

Boys' singles
- (United States) Jonathan Stark

Girls' singles
- (United States) Jennifer Capriati

Boys' doubles
- (South Africa) Wayne Ferreira / (South Africa) Grant Stafford

Girls' doubles
- (United States) Jennifer Capriati / (United States) Meredith McGrath
- US Open

The 1989 US Open was a tennis tournament played on outdoor hard courts at the USTA National Tennis Center in New York City in the United States. It was the 109th edition of the US Open and was held from August 28 to September 10, 1989.

== Seniors ==
=== Men's singles ===
(West Germany) Boris Becker defeated (Czechoslovakia) Ivan Lendl 7–6^{(7–2)}, 1–6, 6–3, 7–6^{(7–4)}

- It was Becker's 4th career Grand Slam title and his only US Open title.

=== Women's singles ===
(West Germany) Steffi Graf defeated (United States) Martina Navratilova 3–6, 7–5, 6–1

- It was Graf's 9th career Grand Slam title and her 2nd US Open title.

=== Men's doubles ===
(United States) John McEnroe / (Australia) Mark Woodforde defeated (United States) Ken Flach / (United States) Robert Seguso 6–4, 4–6, 6–3, 6–3

- It was McEnroe's 16th career Grand Slam title and his 8th and last US Open title. It was Woodforde's 1st career Grand Slam title and his 1st US Open title.

=== Women's doubles ===
(Australia) Hana Mandlíková / (United States) Martina Navratilova defeated (United States) Mary Joe Fernández / (United States) Pam Shriver 5–7, 6–4, 6–4

- It was Mandlíková's 5th and last career Grand Slam title and her 2nd US Open title. It was Navratilova's 52nd career Grand Slam title and her 14th US Open title.

=== Mixed doubles ===
(United States) Robin White / (United States) Shelby Cannon defeated (United States) Meredith McGrath / (United States) Rick Leach 3–6, 6–2, 7–5

- It was White's 2nd and last career Grand Slam title and her 2nd US Open title. It was Cannon's only career Grand Slam title.

== Juniors ==
=== Boys' singles ===
(United States) Jonathan Stark defeated (Sweden) Nicklas Kulti 6–4, 6–1

=== Girls' singles ===
(United States) Jennifer Capriati defeated (Australia) Rachel McQuillan 6–2, 6–3

=== Boys' doubles ===
(South Africa) Wayne Ferreira / (South Africa) Grant Stafford defeated (Czechoslovakia) Martin Damm / (Czechoslovakia) Jan Kodeš Jr. 6–3, 6–4

=== Girls' doubles ===
(United States) Jennifer Capriati / (United States) Meredith McGrath defeated (Australia) Jo-Anne Faull / (Australia) Rachel McQuillan 6–0, 6–3

== Coverage ==
Television coverage included eighty hours of programming over a 12-day period. Live coverage began on August 28, 1989, and concluded with the final of the Women's Doubles on September 10, 1989. The four final days of televised coverage consisted of four men's singles matches (two quarterfinals, one semifinal and the final), three women's singles matches (two semifinals and the final), one men's doubles match (the final), two women's doubles matches (a semifinal and the final) and one mixed doubles match (the final).

== Notes and references ==
Preceded by 1989 Wimbledon Championships	Grand Slams	Succeeded by 1990 Australian Open
