= 1982 NCAA Division I women's tennis championships =

1982 NCAA Division I Women's Tennis Championships
- Date: June 1982
- Edition: 1st
- Location: Salt Lake City, Utah
- Venue: (United States) Utah Utes Tennis Facility; Hosted by: University of Utah

Champions

Women's singles
- Alycia Moulton (Stanford)

Women's doubles
- Heather Ludloff / Lynn Lewis (UCLA)

Women's team
- Stanford Cardinal
- NCAA Division I Women's Tennis Championships

The 1982 NCAA Division I Women's Tennis Championships were the first annual championships to determine the national champions of NCAA Division I women's singles, doubles, and team collegiate tennis in the United States.

The inaugural women's team championship was won by the Stanford Cardinal.

Stanford defeated UCLA in the final round, 6–3.

The women's singles title was won by Alycia Moulton from Stanford, and the women's doubles title was won by Heather Ludloff and Lynn Lewis from UCLA.

== Host site ==
This year's tournaments were hosted by the University of Utah at the Utah Tennis Facility in Salt Lake City, Utah. The men's and women's tournaments would not be held at the same site until 2006.

== Team tournament ==
First round
Stanford	9
Clemson	0
Rollins	5
BYU	4
Trinity (TX)	9
Oklahoma State	0
San Diego State	8
Northwestern	1
UCLA	9
Arizona	0
Miami (FL)	5
California	4
USC	9
Pepperdine	0
South Carolina	5
Florida	4

Quarterfinals
Stanford	7
Rollins	2
Trinity (TX)	6
San Diego State	3
UCLA	8
Miami (FL)	1
USC	8
South Carolina	1

Semifinals
Stanford	5
Trinity (TX)	4
UCLA	5
USC	4

Championship
Stanford	6
UCLA	3
Third place
Trinity (TX)	6
USC	3

== See also ==
- 1982 NCAA Division I men's tennis championships
- NCAA Division II Tennis Championships (Men, Women)
- NCAA Division III Tennis Championships (Men, Women)
