= 1982 NCAA Division I tennis championships =

The 1982 NCAA Division I Tennis Championships refer to one of two NCAA-sponsored events held during May 1982 to determine the national champions of men's and women's collegiate tennis in the United States:

- 1982 NCAA Division I Men's Tennis Championships – the 36th annual men's national championships, held at the Dan Magill Tennis Complex at the University of Georgia in Athens, Georgia
- 1982 NCAA Division I Women's Tennis Championships – the 1st annual women's national championships, held at the Utah Tennis Facility in Salt Lake City, Utah

The men's and women's tournaments would not be held at the same site until 2006.

== See also ==
- NCAA Division II Tennis Championships (Men, Women)
- NCAA Division III Tennis Championships (Men, Women)
