= 1989 NCAA Division I women's tennis championships =

1989 NCAA Division I Women's Tennis Championships
- Date: June 1989
- Edition: 8th
- Location: Gainesville, Florida
- Venue: (United States) Linder Stadium; University of Florida

Champions

Women's singles
- (United States) Sandra Birch (Stanford)

Women's doubles
- (United Kingdom) Jackie Holden / (United Kingdom) Claire Pollard (Mississippi State)
← 1988 ·	NCAA Division I Women's Tennis Championships	· 1990 →

The 1989 NCAA Division I Women's Tennis Championships were the eighth annual championships to determine the national champions of NCAA Division I women's singles, doubles, and team collegiate tennis in the United States.

Stanford defeated UCLA, 5–0, to win their fourth consecutive and sixth overall national title.

== Host sites ==
The tournaments were hosted at Linder Stadium at Ring Tennis Complex at the University of Florida in Gainesville, Florida. The men's and women's tournaments would not be held at the same site until 2006.

== Team tournament ==
First round
San Diego State	6
William & Mary	3
Texas	5
Kentucky	4
Arizona	5
Texas A&M	1
San Diego	7
Tennessee	2

Second round
Stanford	9
San Diego State	0
Oklahoma State	7
BYU	2
Georgia	5
Texas	1
California	6
Indiana	3
UCLA
Arizona
USC	6
Arizona State	3
Florida	6
San Diego	1
Pepperdine	5
Miami (FL)	4

Quarterfinals
Stanford	5
Oklahoma State	1
Georgia	5
California	4
UCLA	5
USC	4
Florida	5
Pepperdine	4

Semifinals
Stanford	6
Georgia	0
UCLA	5
Florida	2

Championship
Stanford	5
UCLA	0

== See also ==
- 1989 NCAA Division I Tennis Championships
- 1989 NCAA Division I Men's Tennis Championships
- NCAA Division II Tennis Championships (Men, Women)
- NCAA Division III Tennis Championships (Men, Women)
