= 1995 NCAA Division I men's tennis championships =

1995 NCAA Division I Men's Tennis Championships
- Date: May 1995
- Edition: 49th
- Location: Athens, Georgia
- Venue: Dan Magill Tennis Complex; University of Georgia

Champions

Men's singles
- (Armenia) Sargis Sargsian (Arizona State)

Men's doubles
- (India) Mahesh Bhupathi / (Lebanon) Ali Hamadeh (Mississippi)
← 1994 ·	NCAA Division I Men's Tennis Championships	· 1996 →

The 1995 NCAA Division I Tennis Championships were the 49th annual championships to determine the national champions of NCAA Division I men's singles, doubles, and team collegiate tennis in the United States.

Stanford defeated Ole Miss in the championship final, 4–0, to claim the Cardinal's thirteenth team national title.

== Host sites ==
The men's tournaments were played at the Dan Magill Tennis Complex at the University of Georgia in Athens, Georgia.

The men's and women's tournaments would not be held at the same site until 2006.

== Brackets ==
=== Team championship ===
First round
Duke	1
Stanford	4
California	2
Mississippi State	4
South Alabama	4
Texas	1
Fresno State	3
UCLA	4
Florida	1
Pepperdine	4
Ole Miss	4
USC	3
LSU	0
TCU	4
Arizona State	1
Georgia	4

Quarterfinals
Stanford	4
Mississippi State	0
South Alabama	1
UCLA	4
Pepperdine	2
Ole Miss	4
TCU	1
Georgia	4

Semifinals
Stanford	4
UCLA	1
Ole Miss	4
Georgia	3

Championship
Stanford	4
Ole Miss	0

== See also ==
- 1995 NCAA Division I women's tennis championships
- NCAA Division II Tennis Championships (Men, Women)
- NCAA Division III Tennis Championships (Men, Women)
