= 1986 NCAA Division I men's tennis championships =

1986 NCAA Division I Men's Tennis Championships
- Date: June 1986
- Edition: 40th
- Location: Athens, Georgia
- Venue: Dan Magill Tennis Complex (University of Georgia)

Champions

Men's singles
- Dan Goldie (Stanford)

Men's doubles
- Rick Leach / Tim Pawsat (USC)
← 1985 ·	NCAA Division I Men's Tennis Championships	· 1987 →

The 1986 NCAA Division I Men's Tennis Championships were the 40th annual championships to determine the national champions of NCAA Division I men's singles, doubles, and team collegiate tennis in the United States. This year's tournaments were played in Athens, Georgia, hosted by the University of Georgia.

The men's team championship was won by Stanford, their eighth team national title. The Cardinal defeated Pepperdine in the final round, 5–2.

The men's singles title was won by Dan Goldie from Stanford.

The men's doubles title was won by Rick Leach and Tom Pawsat from USC.

== Host site ==
The tournaments were played at the Dan Magill Tennis Complex at the University of Georgia in Athens, Georgia. The men's and women's tournaments would not be held at the same venue until 2006.

== Brackets ==
=== Team championship ===
First round
Stanford	5
Harvard	2
Clemson	5
Oklahoma State	2
Texas	5
Miami (FL)	3
UCLA	5
Minnesota	0
SMU	5
LSU	2
Arkansas	5
California	2
USC	5
Utah	1
Pepperdine	7
Georgia	2

Quarterfinals
Stanford	5
Clemson	3
Texas	2
UCLA	5
SMU	5
Arkansas	1
USC	2
Pepperdine	5

Semifinals
Stanford	5
UCLA	1
SMU	1
Pepperdine	5

Championship
Stanford	5
Pepperdine	2

== See also ==
- 1986 NCAA Division I Tennis Championships
- NCAA Division II Tennis Championships (Men, Women)
- NCAA Division III Tennis Championships (Men, Women)
