= 1992 NCAA Division I men's tennis championships =

1992 NCAA Division I Men's Tennis Championships
- Date: June 1992
- Edition: 46th
- Location: Athens, Georgia
- Venue: Dan Magill Tennis Complex; University of Georgia

Champions

Men's singles
- (United States) Alex O'Brien (Stanford)

Men's doubles
- (United States) Chris Cocotos / (United States) Alex O'Brien (Stanford)
← 1991 ·	NCAA Division I Men's Tennis Championships	· 1993 →

The 1992 NCAA Division I Tennis Championships were the 46th annual championships to determine the national champions of NCAA Division I men's singles, doubles, and team collegiate tennis in the United States.

Stanford defeated Notre Dame in the championship final, 5–0, to claim the Cardinal's twelfth team national title. With this win, Stanford swept all three men's tennis titles (team, singles, and doubles).

== Host sites ==
The men's tournaments were played at the Dan Magill Tennis Complex in Athens, Georgia, hosted by the University of Georgia.

The men's and women's tournaments would not be held at the same site until 2006.

== Brackets ==
=== Team championship ===
First round
New Mexico	1
Texas	5
Drake	4
Harvard	5
Clemson	3
Ole Miss	5
Duke	5
Miami (FL)	2

Second round
USC	6
Texas	0
Florida	0
Kentucky	5
Notre Dame	5
Mississippi State	3
Harvard	2
Georgia	5
UCLA	6
Ole Miss	0
North Carolina	5
TCU	3
LSU	5
Pepperdine	2
Duke	1
Stanford	5

Quarterfinals
USC	5
Kentucky	3
Notre Dame	5
Georgia	4
UCLA	5
North Carolina	2
LSU	2
Stanford	5

Semifinals
USC	1
Notre Dame	5
UCLA	1
Stanford	5

Championship
Notre Dame	0
Stanford	5

== See also ==
- NCAA Division II Tennis Championships (Men, Women)
- NCAA Division III Tennis Championships (Men, Women)
