= 1991 NCAA Division I men's tennis championships =

1991 NCAA Division I Men's Tennis Championships
- Date: June 1991
- Edition: 45th
- Location: Athens, Georgia
- Venue: Dan Magill Tennis Complex; University of Georgia

Champions

Men's singles
- (United States) Jared Palmer (Stanford)

Men's doubles
- (United States) Matt Lucena / (Norway) Bent-Ove Pedersen (California)
← 1990 ·	NCAA Division I Men's Tennis Championships	· 1992 →

The 1991 NCAA Division I Tennis Championships were the 45th annual championships to determine the national champions of NCAA Division I men's singles, doubles, and team collegiate tennis in the United States.

USC defeated hosts Georgia in the championship final, 5–2, to claim the Trojans' thirteen team national title.

== Host sites ==
The men's tournaments were played at the Dan Magill Tennis Complex in Athens, Georgia, hosted by the University of Georgia.

The men's and women's tournaments would not be held at the same site until 2006.

== Brackets ==
=== Team championship ===
First round
New Mexico	3
Mississippi State	5
Harvard	1
TCU	5
Kansas	2
Notre Dame	5
Oklahoma State	2
South Carolina	5

Second round
UCLA	5
Mississippi State	1
California	5
Pepperdine	4
LSU	5
TCU	3
USC	6
Notre Dame	0
Florida	5
Tennessee	2
Stanford	5
South Carolina	1
Arizona State	5
Kentucky	3

Quarterfinals
Georgia	5
UCLA	4
California	5
LSU	2
USC	6
Florida	0
Stanford	6
Arizona State	0

Semifinals
Georgia	5
California	4
USC	5
Stanford	2

Championship
Georgia	2
USC	5

== See also ==
- NCAA Division II Tennis Championships (Men, Women)
- NCAA Division III Tennis Championships (Men, Women)
