= 1988 NCAA Division I Tennis Championships =

The 1988 NCAA Division I Tennis Championships refer to one of two NCAA-sponsored events held during May 1988 to determine the national champions of men's and women's collegiate tennis in the United States:

- 1988 NCAA Division I Men's Tennis Championships – the 42nd annual men's national championships held at the Dan Magill Tennis Complex at the University of Georgia in Athens, Georgia
- 1988 NCAA Division I Women's Tennis Championships– the 7th annual women's national championships held at the Los Angeles Tennis Center at UCLA in Los Angeles, California

The men's and women's tournaments would not be held at the same site until 2006.

== See also ==
- NCAA Division II Tennis Championships (Men, Women)
- NCAA Division III Tennis Championships (Men, Women)
