= 1996 NCAA Division I men's tennis championships =

1996 NCAA Division I Men's Tennis Championships
- Date: May 1996
- Edition: 50th
- Location: Athens, Georgia
- Venue: Dan Magill Tennis Complex; University of Georgia

Champions

Men's singles
- (United States) Cecil Mamiit (USC)

Men's doubles
- (United States) Justin Gimelstob / (Serbia and Montenegro) Srdjan Muskatirovic (UCLA)

Men's team
- Stanford
← 1995 ·	NCAA Division I Men's Tennis Championships	· 1997 →

The 1996 NCAA Division I Tennis Championships were the 50th annual championships to determine the national champions of NCAA Division I men's singles, doubles, and team collegiate tennis in the United States.

Defending champions Stanford defeated UCLA in the championship final, 4–1, to claim the Cardinal's second consecutive and fourteenth overall team national title.

== Host sites ==
The men's tournaments were played at the Dan Magill Tennis Complex at the University of Georgia in Athens, Georgia.

The men's and women's tournaments would not be held at the same site until 2006.

== Brackets ==
=== Team ===
First Round
UCLA	4
New Mexico	2
Fresno State	4
Pepperdine	0
LSU	0
TCU	4
Minnesota	0
Ole Miss	4
Harvard	1
Mississippi State	4
Georgia	4
Kansas	1
USC	4
Duke	1
Stanford	4
Texas	0

Quarterfinals
UCLA	4
Fresno State
TCU	4
Ole Miss	1
Mississippi State	0
Georgia	4
USC	1
Stanford	4

Semifinals
UCLA	4
TCU	2
Georgia	3
Stanford	4

Championship
UCLA	1
Stanford	4

== See also ==
- 1996 NCAA Division I women's tennis championships
- NCAA Division II Tennis Championships (Men, Women)
- NCAA Division III Tennis Championships (Men, Women)
