= 1986 NCAA Division I Tennis Championships =

The 1986 NCAA Division I Tennis Championships refer to one of two NCAA-sponsored events held during May 1986 to determine the national champions of men's and women's collegiate tennis in the United States:

- 1986 NCAA Division I Men's Tennis Championships – the 40th annual men's national championships held at the Dan Magill Tennis Complex at the University of Georgia in Athens, Georgia
- 1986 NCAA Division I Women's Tennis Championships– the 5th annual women's national championships held at the Penick-Allison Tennis Center at the University of Texas in Austin, Texas

The men's and women's tournaments would not be held at the same site until 2006.

== See also ==
- NCAA Division II Tennis Championships (Men, Women)
- NCAA Division III Tennis Championships (Men, Women)
