= 1989 NCAA Division I men's tennis championships =

1989 NCAA Division I Men's Tennis Championships
- Date: June 1989
- Edition: 43rd
- Location: Athens, Georgia
- Venue: Dan Magill Tennis Complex (University of Georgia)

Champions

Men's singles
- Donni Leaycraft (LSU)

Men's doubles
- Eric Amend / Byron Black (USC)
- NCAA Division I Men's Tennis Championships

The 1989 NCAA Division I Men's Tennis Championships were the 43rd annual championships to determine the national champions of NCAA Division I men's singles, doubles, and team collegiate tennis in the United States.

Stanford defeated Georgia, 5–3, in the final of the team championship to win their second consecutive and tenth overall title.

== Host site ==
The tournaments were played at the Dan Magill Tennis Complex at the University of Georgia in Athens, Georgia. The men's and women's tournaments would not be held at the same venue until 2006.

== Brackets ==
=== Team championship ===
First round
Miami (FL)	5
Ole Miss	1
Oklahoma State	5
Tennessee	4
Utah	5
West Virginia	3
San Diego	5
Minnesota	1

Second round
Stanford	5
Miami (FL)	1
LSU	5
Clemson	3
California	5
Oklahoma State	2
South Carolina	5
Alabama	2
UCLA	5
Utah	1
TCU	5
Kentucky	2
UC Irvine	5
San Diego	3
Georgia	5
USC	1

Quarterfinals
Stanford	5
LSU	3
California	4
South Carolina	5
UCLA	4
TCU	5
UC Irvine	1
Georgia	5

Semifinals
Stanford	5
South Carolina	2
TCU	1
Georgia	5

Championship
Stanford	5
Georgia	3

== See also ==
- 1989 NCAA Division I Tennis Championships
- 1989 NCAA Division I Women's Tennis Championships
- NCAA Division II Tennis Championships (Men, Women)
- NCAA Division III Tennis Championships (Men, Women)
