= 1994 NCAA Division I men's tennis championships =

1994 NCAA Division I Men's Tennis Championships
- Date: May 1994
- Edition: 48th
- Location: South Bend, Indiana
- Venue: Courtney Tennis Center; University of Notre Dame

Champions

Men's singles
- (The Bahamas) Mark Merklein (Florida)

Men's doubles
- (France) Laurent Miquelard / (United States) Joc Simmons (Mississippi State)
| ← 1993 · | NCAA Division I Men's Tennis Championships | · 1995 → |

The 1994 NCAA Division I Tennis Championships were the 48th annual championships to determine the national champions of NCAA Division I men's singles, doubles, and team collegiate tennis in the United States.

Defending champions USC defeated Stanford in the championship final, 4–3, to claim the Trojan's fifteenth team national title (and third title in four years).

== Host sites ==
The men's tournaments were played at the Courtney Tennis Center at the University of Notre Dame in South Bend, Indiana.

The men's and women's tournaments would not be held at the same site until 2006.

== Brackets ==
=== Team championship ===
First round
USC | 4
Princeton | 0
Ole Miss | 2
Texas | 4
Georgia | 4
Notre Dame | 3
Kansas | 0
Mississippi State | 4
Georgia Tech | 1
TCU | 4
Florida | 1
UCLA | 4
Duke | 4
Texas A&M | 1
Fresno State | 2
Stanford | 4

Quarterfinals
USC | 4
Texas | 2
Georgia | 2
Mississippi State | 4
TCU | 3
UCLA | 4
Duke | 0
Stanford | 4

Semifinals
USC | 4
Mississippi State | 0
UCLA | 0
Stanford | 4

Championship
USC | 4
Stanford | 3

== See also ==
- 1994 NCAA Division I women's tennis championships
- NCAA Division II Tennis Championships (Men, Women)
- NCAA Division III Tennis Championships (Men, Women)
