= 1989 NCAA Division I Tennis Championships =

The 1989 NCAA Division I Tennis Championships refer to one of two NCAA-sponsored events held during May 1989 to determine the national champions of men's and women's collegiate tennis in the United States:

- 1989 NCAA Division I Men's Tennis Championships – the 43rd annual men's national championships held at the Dan Magill Tennis Complex at the University of Georgia in Athens, Georgia
- 1989 NCAA Division I Women's Tennis Championships– the 8th annual women's national championships held at Linder Stadium at the University of Florida in Gainesville, Florida

The men's and women's tournaments would not be held at the same site until 2006.

== See also ==
- NCAA Division II Tennis Championships (Men, Women)
- NCAA Division III Tennis Championships (Men, Women)
