= 1985 NCAA Division I Tennis Championships =

The 1985 NCAA Division I Tennis Championships refer to one of two NCAA-sponsored events held during May 1985 to determine the national champions of men's and women's collegiate tennis in the United States:

- 1985 NCAA Division I Men's Tennis Championships – the 39th annual men's national championships held at the Dan Magill Tennis Complex at the University of Georgia in Athens, Georgia
- 1985 NCAA Division I Women's Tennis Championships– the 4th annual women's national championships held at the Oklahoma City Tennis Center in Oklahoma City, Oklahoma

The men's and women's tournaments would not be held at the same site until 2006.

== See also ==
- NCAA Division II Tennis Championships (Men, Women)
- NCAA Division III Tennis Championships (Men, Women)
