= 1993 NCAA Division I men's tennis championships =

1993 NCAA Division I Men's Tennis Championships
- Date: May 1993
- Edition: 47th
- Location: Athens, Georgia
- Venue: Dan Magill Tennis Complex; University of Georgia

Champions

Men's singles
- (United States) Chris Woodruff (Tennessee)

Men's doubles
- (United States) David Blair / (The Bahamas) Mark Merklein (Florida)
← 1992 ·	NCAA Division I Men's Tennis Championships	· 1994 →

The 1993 NCAA Division I Tennis Championships were the 47th annual championships to determine the national champions of NCAA Division I men's singles, doubles, and team collegiate tennis in the United States.

USC defeated hosts Georgia in the championship final, 5–3, to claim the Trojan's fourteenth team national title. This was USC's second men's team title in three years.

== Host sites ==
The men's tournaments were played at the Dan Magill Tennis Complex in Athens, Georgia, hosted by the University of Georgia.

The men's and women's tournaments would not be held at the same site until 2006.

== Brackets ==
=== Team championship ===
First round
Harvard	3
North Carolina	5
Colorado	5
New Mexico	4
Florida	5
Pepperdine	2
TCU	5
VCU	0

Second round
USC	5
North Carolina	2
Mississippi State	3
Notre Dame	5
Tennessee	1
Texas	5
Colorado	0
Stanford	6
Georgia	5
Florida	0
Duke	5
LSU	2
Alabama	5
UAB	4
TCU	1
UCLA	5

Quarterfinals
USC	5
Notre Dame	0
Texas	5
Stanford	2
Georgia	5
Duke	4
Alabama	0
UCLA	5

Semifinals
USC	5
Texas	0
Georgia	5
UCLA	4

Championship
USC	5
Georgia	3

== See also ==
- 1993 NCAA Division I Women's Tennis Championships
- NCAA Division II Tennis Championships (Men, Women)
- NCAA Division III Tennis Championships (Men, Women)
