= 1990 NCAA Division I Tennis Championships =

The 1990 NCAA Division I Tennis Championships refer to one of two NCAA-sponsored events held during June 1990 to determine the national champions of men's and women's collegiate tennis in the United States:

- 1990 NCAA Division I Men's Tennis Championships – the 44th annual men's national championships held at the David X. Marks Tennis Stadium at the University of Southern California in Los Angeles, California
- 1990 NCAA Division I Women's Tennis Championships– the 9th annual women's national championships held at Linder Stadium at the University of Florida in Gainesville, Florida

The men's and women's tournaments would not be held at the same site until 2006.

== See also ==
- NCAA Division II Tennis Championships (Men, Women)
- NCAA Division III Tennis Championships (Men, Women)
