= 1983 NCAA Division I women's tennis championships =

1983 NCAA Division I Women's Tennis Championships
- Date: June 1983
- Edition: 2nd
- Location: Albuquerque, New Mexico
- Venue: (United States) Linda Estes Tennis Complex (University of New Mexico)

Champions

Women's singles
- Beth Herr (USC)

Women's doubles
- Louise Allen / Gretchen Rush (Trinity–TX)
- NCAA Division I Women's Tennis Championships

The 1983 NCAA Division I Women's Tennis Championships were the second annual championships to determine the national champions of NCAA Division I women's singles, doubles, and team collegiate tennis in the United States.

The women's team championship was won by USC, their first title. The Trojans defeated Trinity (TX) in the final round, 8–1. T

he women's singles title was won by Beth Herr from USC, and the women's doubles title was won by Louise Allen and Gretchen Rush from Trinity (TX).

== Host site ==
This year's tournaments were hosted by the University of New Mexico at the Linda Estes Tennis Complex in Albuquerque, New Mexico. The men's and women's tournaments would not be held at the same site until 2006.

== Team tournament ==
First round
Trinity (TX)	9
Northwestern	0
Clemson	5
Oklahoma State	4
Indiana	7
South Carolina	2
UCLA	7
Florida	2
San Diego State	5
Miami (FL)	4
Stanford	9
Princeton	0
California	7
Texas	2
USC	9
Pepperdine	0

Quarterfinals
Trinity (TX)	8
Clemson	1
Indiana	1
UCLA	8
San Diego State	4
Stanford	5
California	2
USC	7

Semifinals
Trinity (TX)	5
UCLA	4
Stanford	1
USC	8

Championship
Trinity (TX)	1
USC	8
Third place
UCLA	5
Stanford	4

== See also ==
- 1983 NCAA Division I men's tennis championships
- NCAA Division II Tennis Championships (Men, Women)
- NCAA Division III Tennis Championships (Men, Women)
- NAIA tennis championships (men, women)
