= 1982 NCAA Division I men's tennis championships =

1982 NCAA Division I Men's Tennis Championships
- Date: June 1982
- Edition: 36th
- Location: Athens, Georgia
- Venue: Dan Magill Tennis Complex (University of Georgia)

Champions

Men's singles
- Mike Leach (Michigan)

Men's doubles
- Peter Doohan / Pat Serret (Arkansas)
- NCAA Division I Men's Tennis Championships

The 1982 NCAA Division I Men's Tennis Championships were the 36th annual championships to determine the national champions of NCAA Division I men's singles, doubles, and team collegiate tennis in the United States. This year's tournaments were played in Athens, Georgia, hosted by the University of Georgia.

The men's team championship was won by the UCLA Bruins, their 14th team national title. UCLA defeated Pepperdine in the final round, 5–1.

The men's singles title was won by Mike Leach from Michigan, and the men's doubles title was won by Peter Doohan and Pat Serret from Arkansas.

== Host site ==
The tournaments were played at the Dan Magill Tennis Complex at the University of Georgia in Athens, Georgia. The men's and women's tournaments would not be held at the same venue until 2006.

== Team championship ==
First round
UCLA	5
Harvard	4
TCU	5
Duke	3
Trinity (TX)	5
USC	3
Georgia	6
Michigan	0
California	5
Miami (FL)	1
Pepperdine	6
Wichita State	3
Clemson	5
Arkansas	3
SMU	5
Utah	1

Quarterfinals
UCLA	6
TCU	0
Trinity (TX)	2
Georgia	5
California	2
Pepperdine	5
Clemson	4
SMU	5

Semifinals
UCLA	5
Georgia	4
Pepperdine	5
SMU	3

Championship
UCLA	5
Pepperdine	1
Third place
Georgia	1
SMU	5

== See also ==
- 1982 NCAA Division I women's tennis championships
- NCAA Division II Tennis Championships (Men, Women)
- NCAA Division III Tennis Championships (Men, Women)
