= 1981 NCAA Division I tennis championships =

1981 NCAA Division I Tennis Championships
- Date: May 1981
- Edition: 36th
- Location: Athens, Georgia, United States
- Venue: Dan Magill Tennis Complex (University of Georgia)

Champions

Men's singles
- Tim Mayotte (Stanford)

Men's doubles
- David Pate / Karl Richter (TCU)
← 1980 ·	NCAA Division I Tennis Championships	· 1982 →

The 1981 NCAA Division I Tennis Championships were the 36th annual tournaments to determine the national champions of NCAA men's college tennis. Matches were played during May 1981 at the Dan Magill Tennis Complex in Athens, Georgia on the campus of the University of Georgia. A total of three championships were contested: men's team, singles, and doubles. A women's tournament would be introduced in 1982.

The men's team championship was retained by the Stanford Cardinal, their sixth team national title. Stanford defeated UCLA in the final round, 5–1. The men's singles title was won by Tim Mayotte from Stanford, and the men's doubles title was won by David Pate and Karl Richter from Texas Christian University.

== Team tournament ==
First round
Stanford	9
Utah	0
California	5
SMU	4
Georgia	7
Houston	2
Pepperdine	7
Harvard	2
UCLA	6
Michigan	3
Arkansas	7
Oklahoma State	2
USC	6
Auburn	3
Clemson	6
Miami (FL)	3

Quarterfinals
Stanford	5
California	1
Georgia	7
Pepperdine	2
UCLA	5
Arkansas	4
USC	6
Clemson	3

Semifinals
Stanford	7
Georgia	2
UCLA	5
USC	4

Championship
Stanford	5
UCLA	1
Third place
Georgia	6
USC	3

== See also ==
- NCAA Division I Women's Tennis Championship (from 1982)
- NCAA Men's Division II Tennis Championship
- NCAA Men's Division III Tennis Championship
