= Michigan Intercollegiate Athletic Association men's basketball tournament =

Sports tournament

MIAA men's basketball tournament
- Conference basketball championship
- Sport: Basketball
- Conference: Michigan Intercollegiate Athletic Association
- Number of teams: 4
- Format: Single-elimination tournament
- Played: 1992–present
- Current champion: Hope (16th)
- Most championships: Hope (16)
- Official website: MIAA men's basketball

Host stadiums
- Campus arenas (1992–present)

Host locations
- Campus sites (1992–present)

The MIAA men's basketball tournament is the annual conference basketball championship tournament for the NCAA Division III Michigan Intercollegiate Athletic Association. The tournament has been held annually since the NEAC's foundation in 1992. It is a single-elimination tournament and seeding is based on regular season records.

The tournament has been dominated by rivals Calvin and Hope. The Knights and Flying Dutchmen have won twenty-five of the thirty-one MIAA tournaments; in fact, fourteen of those finals have featured those two teams.

The winner, declared conference champion, receives the MIAA's automatic bid to the NCAA Men's Division III Basketball Championship.

== Results ==
Year	Champions	Score	Runner-up	Venue
1992	Calvin	97–54	Kalamazoo	Grand Rapids, MI
1993	Calvin	74–72	Albion	Grand Rapids, MI
1994	Calvin	80–59	Kalamazoo	Grand Rapids, MI
1995	Hope	71–60	Calvin	Holland, MI
1996	Hope	89–78	Kalamazoo	Holland, MI
1997	Hope	63–62	Calvin	Holland, MI
1998	Albion	66–65	Hope	Holland, MI
1999	Defiance	75–72 (OT)	Albion	Defiance, OH
2000	Calvin	92–82	Defiance	Grand Rapids, MI
2001	Calvin	77–63	Adrian	Grand Rapids, MI
2002	Hope	70–63	Calvin	Grand Rapids, MI
2003	Hope	61–48	Albion	Albion, MI
2004	Calvin	93–67	Adrian	Holland, MI
2005	Calvin	63–59	Albion	Albion, MI
2006	Hope	68–55	Calvin	Grand Rapids, MI
2007	Calvin	78–76	Hope	Holland, MI
2008	Hope	88–72	Calvin	Holland, MI
2009	Hope	69–59	Calvin	Grand Rapids, MI
2010	Hope	78–74	Calvin	Grand Rapids, MI
2011	Hope	72–67	Calvin	Holland, MI
2012	Hope	65–62 (OT)	Adrian	Holland, MI
2013	Calvin	77–57	Hope	Grand Rapids, MI
2014	Calvin	78–53	Hope	Holland, MI
2015	Calvin	70–69	Hope	Grand Rapids, MI
2016	Alma	62–54	Trine	Holland, MI
2017	Calvin	86–63	Hope	Holland, MI
2018	Hope	106–94	Olivet	Olivet, MI
2019	Albion	76–73	Trine	Angola, IN
2020	Adrian	80–72	Trine	Albion, MI
2021	Trine	64–62	Albion	Angola, IN
2022	Hope	76–68	Calvin	Holland, MI
2023	Hope	61–54	Calvin	Grand Rapids, MI
2024	Hope	72–68 (OT)	Trine	Angola, IN
2025	Calvin	62–59	Hope	Grand Rapids, MI
2026	Hope	72–65	Trine	Olivet, MI

== Championship records ==
School	Finals Record	Finals Appearances	Years
Hope	16–7	23	1995, 1996, 1997, 2002, 2003, 2006, 2008, 2009, 2010, 2011, 2012, 2018, 2022, 2023, 2024, 2026
Calvin	13–10	23	1992, 1993, 1994, 2000, 2001, 2004, 2005, 2007, 2013, 2014, 2015, 2017, 2025
Albion	2–5	7	1998, 2019
Trine	1–5	6	2021
Adrian	1–3	4	2020
Defiance	1–1	2	1999
Alma	1–0	1	2016
Kalamazoo	0–3	3	
Olivet	0–1	1	

== See also ==
- Calvin–Hope men's basketball rivalry
