= 1983 NCAA Division I men's tennis championships =

1983 NCAA Division I Men's Tennis Championships
- Date: June 1983
- Edition: 37th
- Location: Athens, Georgia
- Venue: Dan Magill Tennis Complex (University of Georgia)

Champions

Men's singles
- Greg Holmes (Utah)

Men's doubles
- Allen Miller / Ola Malmqvist (Georgia)
- NCAA Division I Men's Tennis Championships

The 1983 NCAA Division I Men's Tennis Championships were the 37th annual championships to determine the national champions of NCAA Division I men's singles, doubles, and team collegiate tennis in the United States. This year's tournaments were played in Athens, Georgia, hosted by the University of Georgia.

The men's team championship was won by Stanford, their 7th team national title. The Cardinal defeated SMU in the final round, 5–4.

The men's singles title was won by Greg Holmes from Utah, and the men's doubles title was won by Allen Miller and Ola Malmqvist from Georgia.

== Host site ==
The tournaments were played at the Dan Magill Tennis Complex at the University of Georgia in Athens, Georgia. The men's and women's tournaments would not be held at the same venue until 2006.

== Team championship ==
First round
SMU	5
Utah	1
Clemson	7
UC Irvine	2
Pepperdine	5
Wichita State	3
UCLA	5
Michigan	2
Trinity (TX)	5
Miami (FL)	4
USC	6
Texas	3
Arkansas	5
California	2
Stanford	6
Harvard	1

Quarterfinals
SMU	5
Clemson	4
Pepperdine	5
UCLA	4
USC	5
Trinity (TX)	4
Arkansas	4
Stanford	5

Semifinals
SMU	5
Pepperdine	4
USC	4
Stanford	5

Championship
SMU	4
Stanford	5
Third place
Pepperdine	4
USC	5

== See also ==
- 1983 NCAA Division I women's tennis championships
- NCAA Division II Tennis Championships (Men, Women)
- NCAA Division III Tennis Championships (Men, Women)
- NAIA tennis championships (men, women)
