= 1980 NCAA Division I tennis championships =

1980 NCAA Division I Tennis Championships
- Date: May 1980
- Edition: 35th
- Location: Athens, Georgia, United States
- Venue: Dan Magill Tennis Complex (University of Georgia)

Champions

Men's singles
- Robert Van't Hof (USC)

Men's doubles
- Mel Purcell / Rodney Harmon (Tennessee)
← 1979 ·	NCAA Division I Tennis Championships	· 1981 →

The 1980 NCAA Division I Tennis Championships were the 35th annual tournaments to determine the national champions of NCAA men's college tennis. Matches were played during May 1980 at the Dan Magill Tennis Complex in Athens, Georgia on the campus of the University of Georgia. A total of three championships were contested: men's team, singles, and doubles.

The men's team championship was won by the Stanford Cardinal, their 5th team national title. Stanford defeated California in the final round, 5–3. The men's singles title was won by Robert Van't Hof from USC, and the men's doubles title went to Mel Purcell and Rodney Harmon of Tennessee.

== Team tournament ==
First round
California	5
Houston	1
Trinity (TX)	5
Tennessee	4
Arkansas	5
Michigan	0
USC	5
Wichita State	1
Pepperdine	5
Georgia	3
UCLA	5
Miami (FL)	1
Clemson	5
Princeton	4
Stanford	6
Utah	0

Quarterfinals
California	5
Trinity (TX)	2
Arkansas	2
USC	5
Pepperdine	5
UCLA	2
Clemson	2
Stanford	7

Semifinals
California	5
USC	2
Pepperdine	3
Stanford	6

Championship
California	3
Stanford	5
Third place
USC	5
Pepperdine	4

== See also ==
- NCAA Division I Women's Tennis Championship (from 1982)
- NCAA Men's Division II Tennis Championship
- NCAA Men's Division III Tennis Championship
