= 1963 NCAA College Division Tennis Championships =

- Date: May 1963
- Edition: 1st
- Location: St. Louis, Missouri
- Venue: Washington University in St. Louis

Champions

Men's singles
- Gil Rodriguez (Cal State Los Angeles)

Men's doubles
- Gil Rodriguez / John Lee (Cal State Los Angeles)
NCAA College Division Tennis Championships	· 1964 →

The 1963 NCAA College Division Tennis Championships were the first annual tournaments to determine the national champions of NCAA College Division men's singles, doubles, and team collegiate tennis in the United States.

Cal State Los Angeles won the inaugural team championship; the Golden Eagles finished two points ahead of runners-up Southern Illinois in the standings (9–7).

This was the first tournament held exclusively for teams from the NCAA's College Division (now Divisions II and III). Larger universities were placed into the University Division (now Division I), whose eighteenth-annual tennis championship was played during May 1963 at Princeton University and won by USC.

== Host site ==
The 1963 championships were hosted at Washington University in St. Louis.

== Team scoring ==
Until 1983, the men's team championship was determined by points awarded based on individual performances in the singles and doubles events.
