= Armstrong State Pirates and Lady Pirates =

Defunct sports program of Armstrong State University

Armstrong State Pirates
- University: Armstrong State University
- Conference: Peach Belt Conference
- NCAA: Division II
- Athletic director: Lisa Sweany
- Location: Savannah, Georgia
- Varsity teams: 11
- Basketball arena: Alumni Arena
- Baseball stadium: Pirate Field
- Softball stadium: Armstrong Softball Field
- Soccer stadium: Armstrong Soccer Field
- Nickname: Pirates
- Colors: Maroon and gold
- Website: www.armstrongpirates.com

The Armstrong State Pirates (also known as Armstrong, formerly Armstrong Atlantic State) were the athletic teams that represented Armstrong State University (known as Armstrong Atlantic State University until 2014), located in Savannah, Georgia, in NCAA Division II intercollegiate sports. The Pirates and Lady Pirates competed as members of the Peach Belt Conference for all 11 varsity sports. Armstrong had been a member of the Peach Belt from 1990 until the discontinuation of the Pirates athletic program in 2017.

== History ==
Athletics at Armstrong began at the start of the school's history in the 1930s with its teams known as the Geechees. The school won state championships as a junior college in 1938 in men's basketball and men's tennis. Athletics were suspended during World War II. Following the war, the college added new athletic programs, and in 1948 men's basketball won a second state championship.

Armstrong joined the National Association of Intercollegiate Athletics (NAIA) in 1967 and became known as the Pirates after the college became a four-year institution. in 1973 it joined the National Collegiate Athletic Association (NCAA) and became a member of the South Atlantic Conference (SAC) with in-state rivals Valdosta State, Columbus College, and Augusta College. In 1983, Armstrong State College upgraded athletics to NCAA Division I and became a charter member of the Big South Conference in 1985. Soon after in 1987, the Pirates returned to Division II, becoming a charter member of the Peach Belt Conference in 1990. Armstrong holds 91 PBC championships. In addition, the university has appeared in 133 NCAA Championships, winning 12 titles. Armstrong has produced 287 All-Americans. The Armstrong men's and women's tennis teams have combined to capture nine NCAA Division II national championships over the last eight seasons.

With Armstrong's consolidation with Georgia Southern University, it was announced on March 7, 2017 that Armstrong's athletic program would be discontinued at the conclusion of the 2016–17 academic year.

== Varsity teams ==
=== List of teams ===
Men's sports (5)

- Baseball
- Basketball
- Cross country
- Golf
- Tennis

Women's sports (7)

- Basketball
- Cross country
- Golf
- Soccer
- Softball
- Tennis
- Volleyball

== National championships ==
=== Team ===
Before the discontinuation of the athletics program, the Pirates and Lady Pirates had won thirteen Division II team national championships.

| Association | Division | Sport | Year | Opponent/Runner-Up | Score/Points |
|---|---|---|---|---|---|
| NCAA (13) | Division II (13) | Men's Tennis (3) | 2008 | Barry | 5–0 |
| NCAA (13) | Division II (13) | Men's Tennis (3) | 2009 | Barry | 5–0 |
| NCAA (13) | Division II (13) | Men's Tennis (3) | 2012 | West Florida | 5–0 |
| NCAA (13) | Division II (13) | Women's Tennis (10) | 1995 | Grand Canyon | 4–0 |
| NCAA (13) | Division II (13) | Women's Tennis (10) | 1996 | Abilene Christian | 4–0 |
| NCAA (13) | Division II (13) | Women's Tennis (10) | 2005 | BYU–Hawaii | 5–3 |
| NCAA (13) | Division II (13) | Women's Tennis (10) | 2008 | Lynn | 5–2 |
| NCAA (13) | Division II (13) | Women's Tennis (10) | 2009 | Lynn | 5–2 |
| NCAA (13) | Division II (13) | Women's Tennis (10) | 2010 | BYU–Hawaii | 5–1 |
| NCAA (13) | Division II (13) | Women's Tennis (10) | 2012 | BYU–Hawaii | 5–2 |
| NCAA (13) | Division II (13) | Women's Tennis (10) | 2013 | BYU–Hawaii | 5–2 |
| NCAA (13) | Division II (13) | Women's Tennis (10) | 2015 | Barry | 5–2 |
| NCAA (13) | Division II (13) | Women's Tennis (10) | 2016 | BYU–Hawaii | 5–3 |
