= Alumni Arena (Armstrong State University) =

Multi-purpose arena in Savannah, Georgia

Coordinates: 31.979°N 81.160°W

- Interactive map of Alumni Arena
- Location: Georgia Southern University–Armstrong Campus; Savannah, Georgia
- Owner: Georgia Southern University
- Operator: Georgia Southern University–Armstrong Campus
- Capacity: 4,000

Construction
- Opened: 1995

Tenant
- Armstrong State Pirates basketball (1995-2017)

The Alumni Arena is a 4,000 seat multi-purpose arena in Savannah, Georgia, United States. It was built in 1995. It was the home of the Armstrong State University Pirates basketball teams until the Armstrong athletics program was discontinued following the university's consolidation with Georgia Southern University in 2017.
