= Ola Malmqvist =

Swedish tennis player and coach

- Country (sports): Sweden
- Residence: Orlando, Florida, USA
- Born: 25 July 1958 (age 68) Falkenberg, Sweden
- Height: 1.98 m (6 ft 6 in)
- Plays: Right-handed
- Prize money: $ 1,026

Doubles
- Career record: 0–2
- Highest ranking: No. 669 (16 July 1984)

Grand Slam doubles results
- US Open: 1R (1983)

Erik Ola Malmqvist (born 25 July 1958) is a Swedish tennis coach and former player.

== Tennis career ==
Malmqvist attended the University of Georgia and won All-America honors in 1982 and 1983, and in 1983 he, along with Allen Miller, won the NCAA doubles title when they beat Ken Flach and Robert Seguso in the final.

In 1983, with partner Craig Miller, he participated at the US Open, losing in the first round of the doubles. His only other appearance in an ATP event was in 1989, when he partnered Mikael Pernfors in the doubles at the Orlando tournament.

== Coaching career ==
Malmqvist began his coaching career when the parents of the brothers, Luke and Murphy Jensen, appointed him to coach the boys. In 1986, Malmqvist coached his compatriot, Mikael Pernfors to the final of the French Open and to the number 10 position on the ATP rankings. He coached Pernfors for five years, after which he also worked with Catarina Lindqvist, Chanda Rubin and Petr Korda and from 1993 to 1998, he served as head coach of UNLV's women's tennis team. In 1999, Malmqvist joined the USTA coaching staff for the first time.

Malmqvist served as a USA Tennis High Performance coach working with the Touring Pro Program for five year, after which he spent the next five years as a USTA National Coach. In 2008 he was appointed head of women's tennis and from 2009 to 2016, he also helped to coach the United States Fed Cup team. On the women's tour Malmqvist worked with Jamie Hampton, Madison Keys, Bethanie Mattek-Sands, Jamea Jackson, Laura Granville and Patty Schnyder, among others. In Oct 2018, Malmqvist was promoted to Director of Coaching for USTA Player Development, taking over the position from José Higueras.

== ILTF circuit finals ==
=== Singles (1 runners-up) ===
Result	Year	Tournament	Opponent	Score
Loss	1977	Hampshire Tennis Championships	(United Kingdom) Andy W Paton	3–6, 5–7
