= Rollins Tars =

Intercollegiate sports teams representing Rollins College

- University: Rollins College
- Conference: Sunshine State (primary)
- NCAA: Division II
- Athletic director: Pennie Parker
- Location: Winter Park, Florida
- Varsity teams: 21 (10 men's, 11 women's)
- Basketball arena: Harold & Ted Alfond Sports Center
- Baseball stadium: Alfond Stadium at Harper-Shepherd Field
- Softball stadium: Rollins Softball Stadium at Martin Luther King, Jr. Park
- Soccer stadium: Barker Family Stadium at Cahall-Sandspur Field
- Aquatics center: Alfond Swimming Pool
- Lacrosse stadium: Barker Family Stadium at Cahall-Sandspur Field
- Tennis venue: Bert W. Martin Tennis Complex; John Tiedtke Courts
- Nickname: Tars
- Colors: Rollins blue, white, and Rollins gold
- Website: rollinssports.com
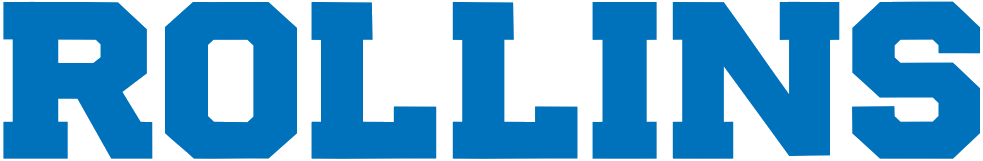

Team NCAA championships
- 12

The Rollins Tars are the athletic teams that represent Rollins College, located in Winter Park, Florida, in NCAA Division II intercollegiate sports. The Tars, an archaic name for a sailor, compete as members of the Sunshine State Conference (SSC) for all 21 varsity sports. Rollins has been a member of the SSC since 1975.

== Varsity teams ==
=== List of teams ===
Men's sports	Women's sports
Baseball	Basketball
Basketball	Golf
Golf	Lacrosse
Lacrosse	Rowing
Rowing	Sailing
Sailing	Soccer
Soccer	Softball
Swimming	Swimming
Tennis	Tennis
Waterski	Volleyball
	Waterski

=== Women's golf ===
In 1950 and 1956, Betty Rowland and Marlene Stewart, respectively, won the women's individual intercollegiate golf championship (an event conducted by the Division of Girls' and Women's Sports (DGWS) — which later evolved into the current NCAA women's golf championship). In later years, Bettina Walker (1988, 1989), Debbie Pappas (1990, 1991, 1992), Mariana De Biase (2006) and Joanna Coe (2008) became individual national champions at the Small College and NCAA Division II levels. As a team, Rollins College has won 13 national championships.

== Former sports ==
=== Football ===
Rollins previously fielded a football team, first in 1904 and last in 1949.

== National championships ==
The Tars have won twelve NCAA Division II team national championships.

=== Team ===
Association	Division	Sport	Year	Opponent/Runner-up	Score
NCAA (12)	Division II (12)	Men's Golf (2)	1970	Georgia Southern	1,195–1,205
NCAA (12)	Division II (12)	Men's Golf (2)	2002	Cal State Stanislaus	1,194–1,195
NCAA (12)	Division II (12)	Women's Golf (6)	2003	Florida Southern	1,237–1,276
NCAA (12)	Division II (12)	Women's Golf (6)	2004	Ferris State; Florida Southern	1,196—1,264
NCAA (12)	Division II (12)	Women's Golf (6)	2005	Grand Valley State	1,185–1,220
NCAA (12)	Division II (12)	Women's Golf (6)	2006	Ferris State	919–925
NCAA (12)	Division II (12)	Women's Golf (6)	2008	Nova Southeastern	1,181–1,188
NCAA (12)	Division II (12)	Women's Golf (6)	2016	Indianapolis	1,173—1,182
NCAA (12)	Division II (12)	Men's Tennis (4)	1966	Cal State Los Angeles; Long Beach State	17–12
NCAA (12)	Division II (12)	Men's Tennis (4)	1972	Kalamazoo	—
NCAA (12)	Division II (12)	Men's Tennis (4)	1991	Cal Poly San Luis Obispo	5–3
NCAA (12)	Division II (12)	Men's Tennis (4)	2001	Hawaii Pacific	5–0
