= Michigan Intercollegiate Athletic Association =

Athletic conference of NCAA Division III schools in Michigan and Indiana

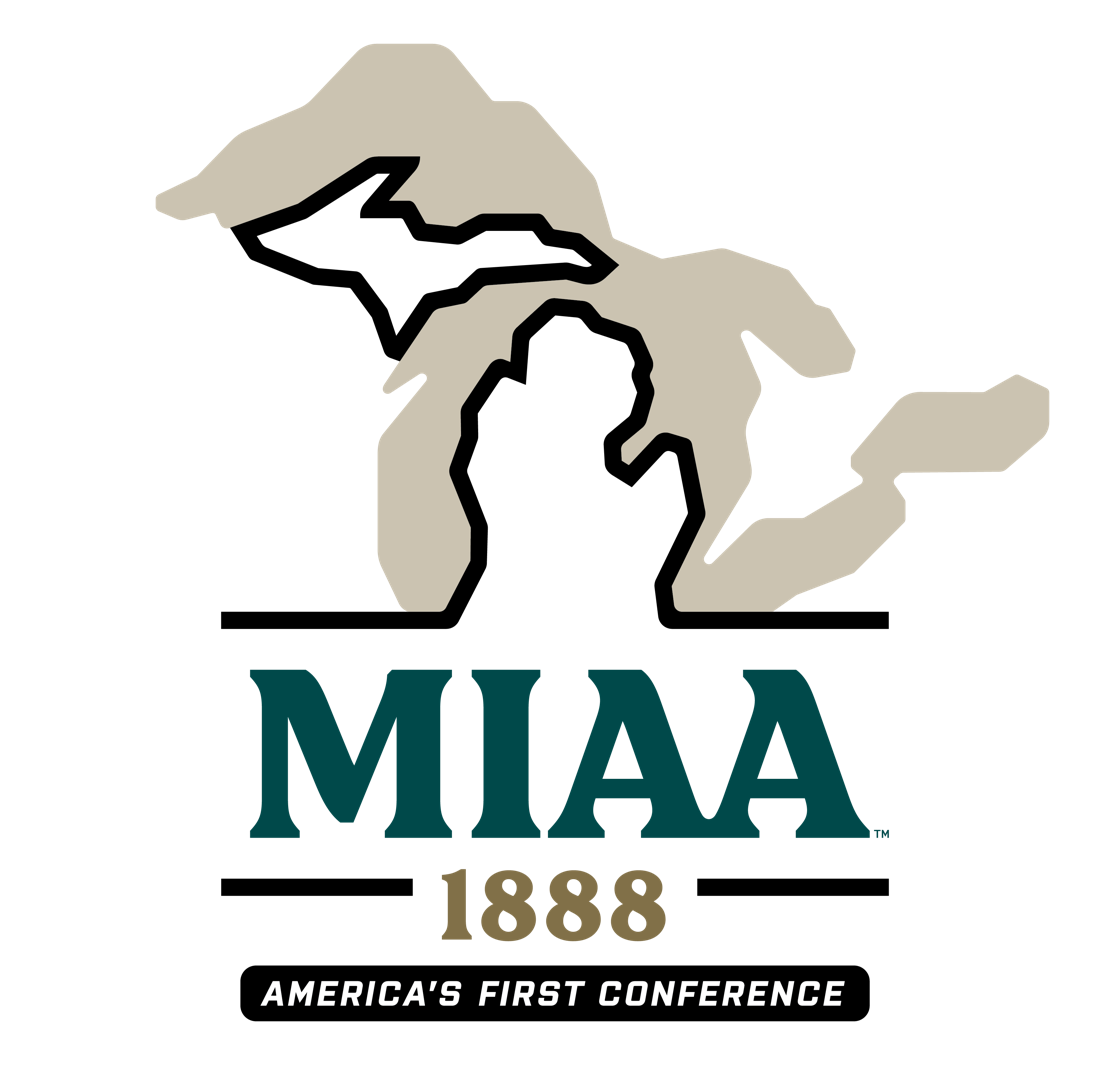
- Association: NCAA
- Founded: 1888
- Commissioner: Lauren Bryne-Dunn (Since Sept. 25, 2026)
- Sports fielded: 23; men's: 12; women's: 11
- Division: Division III
- No. of teams: 9
- Headquarters: Jamestown, Michigan, United States
- Region: Midwestern United States
- Website: www.miaa.org

Locations
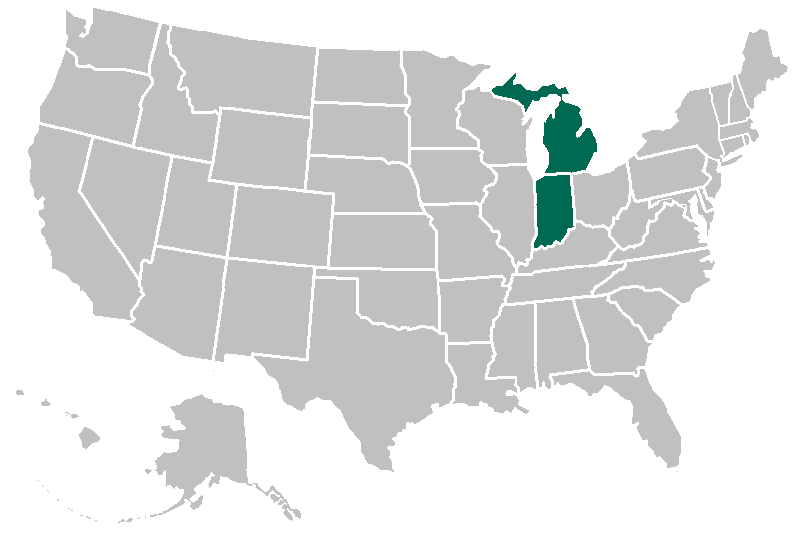

The Michigan Intercollegiate Athletic Association (MIAA) is an intercollegiate athletic conference that competes in the NCAA's Division III. There are nine teams in the conference, all located in the states of Michigan and Indiana. The Michigan Intercollegiate Athletic Association was established on March 24, 1888, making it the oldest college athletic conference in the United States. The current members of the MIAA include Adrian College, Albion College, Alma College, Calvin University, Hope College, Kalamazoo College, University of Olivet, Saint Mary's College of Notre Dame, Indiana, and Trine University, formerly known as Tri-State University. Albion and Olivet are the only charter members remaining in the conference. Former members include such colleges as Michigan State University, previously Michigan Agricultural College, (1888–1907), Eastern Michigan University, previously Michigan State Normal College, (1892–1926), Hillsdale College (1888–1961), and Defiance College (1997–2000).

== History ==
Current members: full members in green, affiliates in blue

The MIAA conference was established on March 24, 1888, and is the oldest collegiate athletic conference in the United States. The conference includes 23 different sports, 12 men's and 11 women's. These sports include cross country, football, golf, basketball, tennis, swimming, baseball, volleyball, softball, indoor track and field, outdoor track and field, lacrosse, soccer, and men's wrestling. Some past sports that are no longer in competition include bicycle racing, Indian club juggling, archery, and field hockey.

In 1977, league presidents voted to allow post-season participation by member schools if they were so invited by the NCAA Division III Football Committee (Harburn 4). This ended a 17-year ban on post-season competition. Albion's 1977 team was the first team chosen to participate. Many teams during the ban did not have the chance to show off their skills as some teams were even ranked in the Top Ten nationally, because of the NCAA rule prohibiting more than two teams from the same region being selected (Harburn 4). Hillsdale College left the conference in 1960 because they accepted a bid to a postseason football bowl game and were subsequently suspended two years by the conference.

=== Chronological timeline ===
- 1888 – The Michigan Intercollegiate Athletic Association (MIAA) was founded. Charter members included Albion College, Hillsdale College, Olivet College (now the University of Olivet) and the State Agricultural College of Michigan (now Michigan State University), beginning the 1888–89 academic year.
- 1892 – Michigan State Normal School (now Eastern Michigan University) joined the MIAA in the 1892–93 academic year.
- 1896 – Kalamazoo College joined the MIAA in the 1896–97 academic year.
- 1902:
  - Eastern Michigan left the MIAA after the 1901–02 academic year.
  - Alma College joined the MIAA in the 1902–03 academic year.
- 1907 – Michigan State left the MIAA after the 1906–07 academic year.
- 1908 – Adrian College joined the MIAA in the 1908–09 academic year.
- 1920 – Eastern Michigan rejoined the MIAA in the 1920–21 academic year.
- 1922 – Adrian left the MIAA after the 1921–22 academic year.
- 1926:
  - Eastern Michigan left the MIAA for a second time after the 1925–26 academic year.
  - Hope College joined the MIAA in the 1926–27 academic year.
- 1937 – Adrian rejoined the MIAA in the 1937–38 academic year.
- 1940 – Olivet left the MIAA after the 1939–40 academic year.
- 1952 – Olivet rejoined the MIAA in the 1952–54 academic year.
- 1953 – Calvin College (now Calvin University) joined the MIAA in the 1953–54 academic year.
- 1978 – The MIAA would add women's sports, beginning the 1978–79 academic year.
- 1997 – Defiance College and Saint Mary's College of Indiana joined the MIAA in the 1997–98 academic year.
- 2000 – Defiance left the MIAA to join the Heartland Collegiate Athletic Conference (HCAC) after the 1999–2000 academic year.
- 2002 – Wisconsin Lutheran College joined the MIAA as an affiliate member for football in the 2002 fall season (2002–03 academic year).
- 2004 – Trine University joined the MIAA in the 2004–05 academic year.
- 2008 – Wisconsin Lutheran left the MIAA as an affiliate member for football after the 2007 fall season (2007–08 academic year).
- 2018 – Finlandia University joined the MIAA as an affiliate member for football in the 2018 fall season (2018–19 academic year).
- 2021 – Finlandia left the MIAA as an affiliate member for football after the 2020 fall season (2020–21 academic year).

== Winning streaks and distinguished coaches ==
The MIAA has had its share of many winning seasons, but there are some that may stick out more than others. For example, Kalamazoo College men's tennis has been a part of one that cannot be matched by any other college or university in America. They have won or shared every MIAA Finals championship since 1936, which is 72 consecutive titles (www.miaa.org accessed 5/2/10). The only times they had to share the title was with Hope College in 1962 and 2003. Some other notable championship streaks include Calvin's men cross country 33 years in a row (active); Calvin's women track & field 27 years in a row.

The first MIAA national championship was won by Kalamazoo in 1976 when it won the men's tennis championship (Renner 19). The Kalamazoo College Hornets would later win back-to-back championships in 1986 and 1987 (Renner 19) and again in 1991, 1992, and 1993.

The league has had many coaches throughout its history. One coach with a noteworthy career is George Acker of Kalamazoo College. Acker was a Phys. Ed Professor and men's tennis coach for 35 years. His resume includes coaching 7 NCAA Division III Championships and 35 MIAA Championships. A notable 209-1 MIAA career dual-meet record and an overall 537–231 record (www.kzoo.edu/sports/ahof/sport.html accessed October 15, 2008). Acker was the winningest coach in the MIAA. He is followed by John Patnott of Hope College, Tish Loveless (Kalamazoo College), Chester Barnard (Kalamazoo College), and Bob Kent also from Kalamazoo College.

Another noteworthy coach was Jare T. Klein of Olivet. As coach of the famed Olivet College wrestling program, Olivet teams won 10 league championships (including 9 straight) in 15 seasons. His team's overall dual meet record during his 29-year coaching tenure was 569 - 119. It appears that Klein may have been a victim to his own success as the MIAA dropped wrestling as a league sport in 1984.

== Rivalries ==
The MIAA league had its own rivalries. In an interview with Jamie Zorbo, head football coach for Kalamazoo College, talked about the tradition of the MIAA and the rivalries. "It is a competitive league; all the teams that are competing have been for a long time and have a lot of history to play for... Great rivalries are made including Kalamazoo vs. Hope; Albion vs. Kalamazoo and the Calvin vs. Hope rivalry in basketball. These are just a few of them." (Zorbo, Jamie. Personal Interview, October 15, 2008).

The Calvin vs. Hope rivalry has actually made national news. ESPN recently identified the nation's greatest college basketball rivalries. Calvin–Hope rivalry tops the Division III and is ranked fourth in all college hoops. ESPN covered this game in 2005 and a "fan poll" was conducted after the game where 80% of the voters voted for Calvin-Hope as number one. It was also covered in July 2007 in an ESPN series (http://www.hope.edu/pr/athletics/therivalry/index.html accessed October 15, 2008).

== Member schools ==
=== Current members ===
The MIAA currently has nine full members, all are private schools:

Institution	Location	Founded	Affiliation	Enrollment	Nickname	Joined (Note: Represents the calendar year when fall sports competition begins.)	Colors	Football?
Adrian College	Adrian, Michigan	1859	United Methodist	1,671	Bulldogs	1908; 1937 (Note: Adrian left the MIAA after the 1921–22 school year, before rejoining in the 1937–38 school year.)		Yes
Albion College	Albion, Michigan	1835	Nonsectarian	1,568	Britons	1888		Yes
Alma College	Alma, Michigan	1886	Presbyterian	1,400	Scots	1902		Yes
Calvin University	Grand Rapids, Michigan	1876	Christian Reformed	3,746	Knights	1953		Yes
Hope College	Holland, Michigan	1866	Reformed	3,150	Flying Dutchmen	1926		Yes
Kalamazoo College	Kalamazoo, Michigan	1833	Nonsectarian	1,436	Hornets	1896		Yes
University of Olivet (Note: Formerly known as Olivet College until 2023.)	Olivet, Michigan	1844	United Church of Christ	1,086	Comets	1888; 1952 (Note: Olivet left the MIAA after the 1939–40 school year, before rejoining in the 1952–53 school year.)		Yes
Saint Mary's College (Note: This institution is a women's college, therefore it does not compete in men's sports.)	Notre Dame, Indiana	1844	Catholic (CSC)	2,658	Belles	1997		No
Trine University	Angola, Indiana	1884	Nonsectarian	4,104	Thunder	2004		Yes

=== Former members ===
The MIAA had four former full members, two being public schools and the other two being private: Both public schools are now NCAA Division I members, with one being a member of one of the so-called Power Five conferences.

Institution	Location	Founded	Affiliation	Enrollment	Nickname	Joined (Note: Represents the calendar year when fall sports competition begins.)	Left (Note: Represents the calendar year when spring sports competition ends.)	Current conference
Defiance College	Defiance, Ohio	1850	U.C.C.	1,000	Yellow Jackets	1997	2000	Wolverine–Hoosier (WHAC) (Note: Currently an NAIA athletic conference.)
Hillsdale College	Hillsdale, Michigan	1844	Nonsectarian	1,200	Chargers	1888	1961	Great Midwest (G-MAC) (Note: Currently an NCAA Division II athletic conference.)
Michigan State Normal College (Note: Currently known as Eastern Michigan University since 1959.)	Ypsilanti, Michigan	1849	Public	22,974	Eagles	1892; 1920	1902; 1926 (Note: Eastern Michigan withdrew from the MIAA from 1902–03 to 1919–20.)	Mid-American (MAC) (Note: Currently an NCAA Division I athletic conference.)
State Agricultural College of Michigan (Note: Currently known as Michigan State University since 1964.)	East Lansing, Michigan	1855	Public	45,520	Spartans	1888	1907	Big Ten (B1G)

=== Former affiliate members ===
The MIAA had two former affiliate members, both were private schools:

Institution	Location	Founded	Affiliation	Enrollment	Nickname	Joined (Note: Represents the calendar year when fall sports competition begins.)	Left (Note: Represents the calendar year when spring sports competition ends.)	MIAA sport(s)	Current conference
Finlandia University	Hancock, Michigan	1896	Lutheran ELCA	550	Lions	2018	2021	football	Closed in 2023
Wisconsin Lutheran College	Milwaukee, Wisconsin	1973	Lutheran WELS	765	Warriors	2002	2008	football	Northern (NACC)

=== Membership timeline ===
Full member (all sports) Full member (non-football) Associate member (football) Associate member (sport)

== Sports ==
Conference Sports

Sport	Men's	Women's
Baseball	✓	
Basketball	✓	✓
Cross Country	✓	✓
Football	✓	
Golf	✓	✓
Lacrosse	✓	✓
Soccer	✓	✓
Softball		✓
Swimming & Diving	✓	✓
Tennis	✓	✓
Track & Field (Indoor)	✓	✓
Track & Field (Outdoor)	✓	✓
Volleyball		✓
Wrestling	✓	

=== Men's Sports ===
School	Baseball	Basketball	Cross Country	Football	Golf	Lacrosse	Soccer	Swimming & Diving	Tennis	Track & Field (Indoor)	Track & Field (Outdoor)	Wrestling	Total MIAA Sports
Adrian	✓	✓	✓	✓	✓	✓	✓	✗	✓	✓	✓	✓	11
Albion	✓	✓	✓	✓	✓	✓	✓	✓	✓	✓	✓	✓	12
Alma	✓	✓	✓	✓	✓	✓	✓	✓	✓	✓	✓	✓	12
Calvin	✓	✓	✓	✓	✓	✓	✓	✓	✓	✓	✓	✗	11
Hope	✓	✓	✓	✓	✓	✓	✓	✓	✓	✓	✓	✗	11
Kalamazoo	✓	✓	✓	✓	✓	✓	✓	✓	✓	✓	✓	✗	11
Olivet	✓	✓	✓	✓	✓	✗	✓	✗	✓	✓	✓	✓	10
Trine	✓	✓	✓	✓	✓	✓	✓	✗	✓	✓	✓	✓	11
Totals	8	8	8	8	8	7	8	5	8	8	8	5	89

==== Men's varsity sports not sponsored by the MIAA that are played by MIAA schools ====
School	Bass Fishing	Bowling	Clay Target	Cornhole	Equestrian	eSports	Ice Hockey	Rowing	Rugby	Volleyball
Adrian	✓	✓		✓		✓	NCHA	✓	✓	MCVL
Albion					IHSA					
Alma						✓				
Calvin										MCVL
Olivet		✓	✓			✓				MCVL
Trine		✓				✓	NCHA		✓	MCVL

=== Women's Sports ===
School	Basketball	Cross Country	Golf	Lacrosse	Soccer	Softball	Swimming & Diving	Tennis	Track & Field (Indoor)	Track & Field (Outdoor)	Volleyball	Total MIAA Sports
Adrian	✓	✓	✓	✓	✓	✓	✗	✓	✓	✓	✓	10
Albion	✓	✓	✓	✓	✓	✓	✓	✓	✓	✓	✓	11
Alma	✓	✓	✓	✓	✓	✓	✓	✓	✓	✓	✓	11
Calvin	✓	✓	✓	✓	✓	✓	✓	✓	✓	✓	✓	11
Hope	✓	✓	✓	✓	✓	✓	✓	✓	✓	✓	✓	11
Kalamazoo	✓	✓	✓	✓	✓	✓	✓	✓	✓	✓	✓	11
Olivet	✓	✓	✓	✗	✓	✓	✗	✓	✓	✓	✓	9
Saint Mary's	✓	✓	✓	✓	✓	✓	✗	✓	✗	✗	✓	8
Trine	✓	✓	✓	✓	✓	✓	✗	✓	✓	✓	✓	10
Totals	9	9	9	8	9	9	5	9	8	8	9	92

==== Women's varsity sports not sponsored by the MIAA that are played by MIAA schools ====
School	Acrobatics & Tumbling	Bowling	Clay Target	Cornhole	Equestrian	eSports	Figure Skating	Ice Hockey	Rowing	Rugby	Synchronized Skating	Triathlon	Wrestling
Adrian	✓	✓		✓	IHSA	✓	✓	NCHA	✓	✓	✓		IND
Albion					IHSA								IND
Alma		✓				✓							IND
Olivet		✓	✓			✓							2027-28
Trine	✓	✓				✓	✓	NCHA			✓	✓	IND
