= Nova Southeastern Sharks women's tennis =

Nova Southeastern Sharks
- University: Nova Southeastern University
- Conference: Sunshine
- Location: Davie, FL
- Colors: Navy blue and gray

NCAA Tournament championships
- 2024

The NSU Sharks Women's Tennis team represents Nova Southeastern University in Davie, Florida, United States. They compete in the Sunshine State Conference.

== History ==
The women's team started in the 2003–2004 academic year. In 2024 they won their first championship, after a win over their rival, Barry University.

== Season-by-season results ==
Year	Head Coach	Record	Win %
2004	Michael Coleman	1–15	.063
2005	Michael Coleman	14–12	.539
2006	Michael Coleman	16–8	.670
2007	Michael Coleman	22–3	.880
2008	Michael Coleman	14–8	.857
2009	Michael Coleman	17–8	.783
2010	Michael Coleman	8-13	.381
2011	Michael Coleman	10-11	.476
2012	Michael Coleman	9-14	.391
2013	Michael Coleman	8-13	.615
2014	Stephen Schram	13-11	.542
2015	Stephen Schram	18-3	.857
2016	Stephen Schram	15-5	.750
2017	Doug Neagle	9-9	.500
2018	Doug Neagle	9-15	.375
2019	Doug Neagle	22-5	.815
2020	Doug Neagle	12-1	.923
2021	Doug Neagle	9-3	.750
2022	Doug Neagle	25-4	.862
2023	Doug Neagle	26-3	.897
2024	Doug Neagle	27-4	.871
2025	Doug Neagle	25-4	.862
Totals		318–172	.650
