= Lynn Lewis (tennis) =

American former professional tennis player

- Country (sports): United States
- Born: November 14, 1963 (age 61)
- Prize money: $10,280

Singles
- Career record: 18–19
- Highest ranking: No. 425 (February 2, 1987)

Doubles
- Career record: 34–19
- Highest ranking: No. 295 (February 2, 1987)

Lynn Lewis (born November 14, 1963) is an American former professional tennis player.

Lewis, a native of San Diego, is the daughter of local television and radio announcer Fred Lewis.

A three-time All-American for the UCLA Bruins, Lewis won the NCAA doubles championship in 1982 partnering Heather Ludloff. In the immediate celebrations afterwards, she tore an ankle ligament after leaping in the air and the injury kept her on the sidelines for her sophomore season. She made another NCAA doubles final as a senior.

Lewis had wins over Mercedes Paz and Gabriela Sabatini at a satellite tournament in Key Biscayne in 1984.

In 1985 and 1986 she toured as a professional.
