= Calvin–Hope men's basketball rivalry =

Sports rivalry

The Calvin–Hope men's basketball rivalry is a college sports rivalry between the men's basketball teams of Hope College Flying Dutchmen of Holland, Michigan, and the Calvin University Knights of Grand Rapids, Michigan, which participate at the NCAA Division III level.

== History ==
The men's basketball teams first played each other in 1920. As of October 2023, the men's basketball teams have played 212 times, with the Hope Flying Dutchmen leading with 110 wins to the Calvin Knights' 102 wins. The rivalry, which originates from the historical separation of the Reformed Church in America and the Christian Reformed Church in North America, operates on a basis of more similarity than difference. Tom Davelaar, assistant coach to Hope's basketball team, once said, "... both schools and fan bases are so alike - and yet we think we're different somehow. We're really just two peas in a pod." The face off in 2020 marked the 100th anniversary since the rivalry started.

In 2009, the rivalry turned ugly - the two teams faced off against each other in the MIAA championship when a Hope student was instigating fans in the upper concourse late in the 2nd half at VanNoord Arena celebrating what would become a Hope victory, when the Hope student kicked a Calvin student's legs and a scuffle occurred.

In 2015, it again turned ugly as Calvin students stormed the court in a nail-biter victory in the MIAA championship, while a Hope player laid in the middle of the floor, nearly getting trampled by the court storming.

== Significance ==
In 2005, ESPN polled its staff about who they thought were America's greatest college basketball rivalries, and the Calvin–Hope rivalry was voted fourth in all college basketball behind Carolina–Duke rivalry, Connecticut–Tennessee women's basketball rivalry, and Kentucky–Louisville rivalry. ESPN also conducted an on-line "fan poll" in which 80% of voters picked the Knights vs. Flying Dutchmen.

The rivalry between the two colleges is most prominent in basketball; however, the rivalry spans the schools' athletics.
