= Cal State Los Angeles Golden Eagles =

Sports teams of California State University

- University: California State University, Los Angeles
- Nickname: Golden Eagles
- NCAA: Division II
- Conference: CCAA (primary); PacWest (women's tennis)
- Athletic director: Dr. Daryl Gross
- Location: Los Angeles, California
- Varsity teams: 13 (5 men's, 8 women's)
- Basketball arena: University Gym
- Baseball stadium: Reeder Field
- Soccer stadium: University Stadium
- Tennis venue: Cal State LA Tennis Complex
- Colors: Black and gold
- Mascot: Eddie
- Website: lagoldeneagles.com
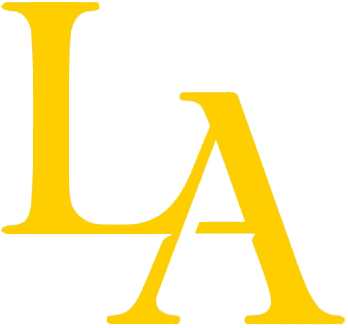

Team NCAA championships
- 5

Individual and relay NCAA champions
- 71

The Cal State Los Angeles Golden Eagles (also Cal State LA Golden Eagles) are the athletic teams that represent California State University, Los Angeles in NCAA Division II intercollegiate sports. The Golden Eagles compete as members of the California Collegiate Athletic Association for all 10 varsity sports. Cal State LA previously competed in Division I and was a founding member of the Pacific Coast Athletic Association in 1969, leaving in 1974 but not before winning the conference's basketball title and participating in the NCAA Division I men's basketball tournament.

Cal State LA's more than 11 acres (4.5 ha) of athletic facilities is named the Billie Jean King Sports Complex. The sports complex—designation which was approved by the CSU Board of Trustees Sept. 21—features the Eagles Nest Gymnasium, the University Stadium, Jesse Owens Track and Field, Reeder Field (baseball), the swimming pool, and tennis and basketball courts.

== History ==
The mascot of CSULA was the Diablos from 1947-1980. Eagles Nest is home to the Cal State LA basketball and volleyball teams. The arena seats just over 3,200 fans at full capacity. In 1984, the Eagles Nest hosted the Summer XXIII (23rd) Olympics judo competition. In July 1984 the Olympic Mural, “Olympic Fantasy,” a mosaic tile work by muralist Guillermo "Bill" Granizo, was installed on west side of the arena in remembrance of the event.

== Fight song ==
The Fight Song Golden Eagles! We're behind you all the way. Golden Eagles! Black and Gold is here to stay. Golden Eagles! Now it's on to win the day. We will fight, fight, fight. Fight with all our might for Cal State L.A.!

— Fran Baxter

== Championships ==
Entering the 2017–18 school year, Cal State LA has won a total of 75 conference championships in the university's history. This is in addition to the nine National Championships and 10 National Runner-Up Finishes.

=== National championships won ===
Cal State Los Angeles National Championships
Season	Division	Sport	Notes
1963	College Division	Men's tennis	
1964	College Division	Men's tennis	
1964	College Division	Football	#1 on the UPI poll
1965	College Division	Men's tennis	
1978	Division II	Men's Track and Field	
1979	Division II	Men's Archery	
1981	Division II	Women's Badminton	
2021	Division II	Men's Soccer	
2024	Division II	Women's Volleyball	

== Billie Jean King Sports Complex ==
Cal State LA moved its tennis program in 2014 from the California Collegiate Athletic Association to the Pacific West Conference.

The two-story, 8,500 square foot facility at California State University, Los Angeles (Cal State L.A.) is strategically located between the university's stadium running track and tennis center. The lower-level houses locker rooms, training facilities, and public restrooms, accessible to both stadium and tennis court users. This design allows the university’s soccer, track and field, and tennis teams to share the space. The upper level features the Cal State L.A. Sports Hall of Fame and a hospitality suite with a small kitchen. Enclosed by floor-to-ceiling windows, this level includes a covered outdoor terrace offering uninterrupted views of the tennis courts and stadium soccer field and track. Surrounding the building are grandstands for tennis viewing and an outdoor assembly area for university events.

== Varsity sports ==
Men's sports	Women's sports
Baseball	Basketball
Basketball	Beach volleyball
Cross country	Cross country
Soccer	Golf
Track and field	Soccer
	Tennis
	Track and field^{†}
	Volleyball
† – Track and field includes both indoor and outdoor.

=== Football ===
In 1964, the undefeated Diablos were voted national champions, via the UPI coaches' poll, for the NCAA's College Division.

Cal State LA's football program was disbanded after the 1977 season.

=== Men's golf ===
Bob Clark won the NCAA Division I Golf Championship in 1969.

=== Men's soccer ===
Since 2018 Michael Erush has been the Head Men's Soccer Coach of the Cal State Los Angeles Golden Eagles at California State University-Los Angeles.

=== Baseball ===
During Cal State L.A.'s tenure in Division I, the baseball team achieved notable success, including two appearances in the NCAA Baseball Tournament. One of the most remarkable achievements in the program's history came in 1977, when the Diablos made an improbable run to the College World Series (CWS). That year, CSULA pulled off a stunning feat by defeating the powerhouse USC Trojans – who had claimed 10 national championships at the time — twice to emerge from the regional round. Their journey continued to the CWS, where the Diablos battled fiercely, ultimately finishing with a 2–2 record and securing a 4th place finish. This remarkable achievement remains one of the high points in Cal State L.A's baseball legacy, showcasing the team's resilience and skill on the national stage.

== Championships ==
=== Appearances ===
The CSU Los Angeles Golden Eagles competed in the NCAA tournament across 13 active sports (6 men's and 7 women's) 158 times at the Division II level.

- Baseball (4): 1998, 2006, 2007, 2013
- Men's basketball (6): 1957, 1959, 1974, 1995, 1998, 2000
- Women's basketball (2): 2006, 2012
- Men's cross country (5): 1975, 1978, 1987, 1988, 1989
- Women's cross country (8): 1987, 1988, 1989, 1990, 1992, 2006, 2007, 2008
- Men's soccer (14): 1981, 1992, 1994, 2006, 2008, 2009, 2011, 2012, 2013, 2014, 2015, 2017, 2018, 2021
- Women's soccer (5): 2007, 2009, 2010, 2011, 2014
- Women's tennis (9): 1988, 1990, 1992, 1995, 1998, 2004, 2005, 2007, 2008
- Men's indoor track and field (9): 1985, 1987, 1988, 1989, 1990, 1991, 1993, 1996, 2017
- Women's indoor track and field (19): 1991, 1992, 1996, 1997, 1998, 1999, 2001, 2002, 2004, 2005, 2006, 2007, 2008, 2009, 2010, 2011, 2012, 2013, 2018
- Men's outdoor track and field (42): 1976, 1977, 1978, 1979, 1980, 1981, 1982, 1983, 1984, 1985, 1986, 1987, 1988, 1989, 1990, 1991, 1992, 1993, 1994, 1995, 1996, 1997, 1998, 2000, 2001, 2002, 2003, 2004, 2005, 2006, 2007, 2008, 2009, 2010, 2011, 2012, 2013, 2014, 2015, 2016, 2017, 2018
- Women's outdoor track and field (20): 1990, 1991, 1992, 1996, 1997, 1998, 1999, 2001, 2002, 2003, 2004, 2005, 2006, 2007, 2009, 2010, 2011, 2012, 2013, 2018
- Women's volleyball (17): 1992, 1993, 1994, 1995, 1997, 1999, 2000, 2001, 2002, 2004, 2005, 2006, 2007, 2008, 2009, 2010, 2018

The Golden Eagles participated in the 1974 NCAA Division I Basketball Tournament, going 0–1 with an 88–80 loss to Dayton.

=== Team ===
The Golden Eagles of CSU Los Angeles earned five NCAA team championships at the Division II level.

- Men's (5)
  - Outdoor track and field (1): 1978
  - Soccer (1): 2021
  - Tennis (3): 1963, 1964, 1965

Results

School year	Sport	Opponent	Score
1962–63	Men's tennis	Southern Illinois	9–7
1963–64	Men's tennis	Southern Illinois	15–15
1964–65	Men's tennis	Redlands	20–16
1977–78	Men's outdoor track and field	Cal Poly	70–59.5
2021–22	Men's soccer	Charleston (WV)	1-0

Below is one national club team championship:

- Men's archery (1): 1979 (USA Archery)

=== Individual ===
At the NCAA Division II level, CSU Los Angeles has seen 71 Golden Eagles claim individual championships.

NCAA individual championships
Order	School year	Athlete(s)	Sport	Source
1	1962–63	Gil Rodriguez; John Lee	Men's tennis	
2	1962–63	Gil Rodriguez	Men's tennis	
3	1963–64	Gary Johnson	Men's tennis	
4	1963–64	Jay Moxley	Men's swimming and diving	
5	1963–64	Jay Moxley	Men's swimming and diving	
6	1964–65	Gary Johnson	Men's tennis	
7	1967–68	Bob Delgado	Men's tennis	
8	1976–77	Rick Hoss	Men's swimming and diving	
9	1976–77	Colin Sutherland	Men's outdoor track and field	
10	1976–77	Sam Turner	Men's outdoor track and field	
11	1977–78	Chester Hart	Men's outdoor track and field	
12	1977–78	Craig Robinson	Men's outdoor track and field	
13	1977–78	Sam Turner	Men's outdoor track and field	
14	1978–79	Kimmo Jokivaritio	Men's outdoor track and field	
15	1979–80	Sam Turner	Men's outdoor track and field	
16	1979–80	Sam Turner	Men's outdoor track and field	
17	1981–82	Tommy Lister	Men's outdoor track and field	
18	1984–85	Gordon Bugg	Men's outdoor track and field	
19	1985–86	Stan Oporski	Men's outdoor track and field	
20	1986–87	Stan Oporski	Men's indoor track and field	
21	1986–87	Stan Oporski	Men's outdoor track and field	
22	1987–88	Sylvia Mosqueda	Women's cross country	
23	1989–90	Brian Fisher	Men's indoor track and field	
24	1989–90	Edna Olivarez	Women's tennis	
25	1989–90	Edna Olivarez; Jennifer Choi	Women's tennis	
26	1990–91	Darcy Richards; Socorro Vasquez; Marlene Wilcox; Margo Grant	Women's outdoor track and field	
27	1990–91	Rich Doering	Men's outdoor track and field	
28	1990–91	Marlene Wilcox	Women's outdoor track and field	
29	1991–92	Margo Grant; Socorro Vasquez; Marlene Wilcox; Christy Opara	Women's indoor track and field	
30	1991–92	Bryan Bridgewater	Men's outdoor track and field	
31	1991–92	Bryan Bridgewater	Men's outdoor track and field	
32	1991–92	Brandi Gail	Women's indoor track and field	
33	1991–92	Christy Opara	Women's indoor track and field	
34	1992–93	Marsha Guialdo	Women's indoor track and field	
35	1992–93	Marsha Guialdo	Women's outdoor track and field	
36	1992–93	Marsha Guialdo	Women's outdoor track and field	
37	1992–93	Janet Hill	Women's indoor track and field	
38	1992–93	Janet Hill	Women's outdoor track and field	
39	1992–93	Janet Hill	Women's outdoor track and field	
40	1993–94	Janet Hill	Women's indoor track and field	
41	1993–04	Janet Hill	Women's outdoor track and field	
42	1993–04	Janet Hill	Women's outdoor track and field	
43	1994–95	Francesca Carver	Women's outdoor track and field	
44	1995–96	Ray Banner	Men's indoor track and field	
45	1995–96	LaVera Clark	Women's outdoor track and field	
46	1995–96	Jonathan Jordan	Men's indoor track and field	
47	1995–96	Jonathan Jordan	Men's outdoor track and field	
48	1995–96	Petra Juraskova	Women's indoor track and field	
49	1995–96	Petra Juraskova	Women's outdoor track and field	
50	1995–96	Petra Juraskova	Women's outdoor track and field	
51	1995–96	Tambi Wenj	Men's indoor track and field	
52	1995–96	Tambi Wenj	Men's outdoor track and field	
53	1996–97	Petra Juraskova	Women's indoor track and field	
54	1996–97	Petra Juraskova	Women's outdoor track and field	
55	1997–98	Jonathan Jordan	Men's outdoor track and field	
56	1997–98	Kirran Moss	Women's indoor track and field	
57	1998–99	Nicole Duncan	Women's indoor track and field	
58	2000–01	Nicole Duncan	Women's indoor track and field	
59	2000–01	Nicole Duncan	Women's outdoor track and field	
60	2000–01	Louise Ayetotche	Women's indoor track and field	
61	2001–02	Nicole Duncan	Women's indoor track and field	
62	2001–02	Nicole Duncan	Women's indoor track and field	
63	2001–02	Nicole Duncan	Women's outdoor track and field	
64	2001–02	Nicole Duncan	Women's outdoor track and field	
65	2001–02	Nicole Duncan	Women's outdoor track and field	
66	2005–06	April Brown	Women's indoor track and field	
67	2007–08	Omonike Kotey	Women's indoor track and field	
68	2010–11	Giorgio Bryant	Men's outdoor track and field	
69	2010–11	Josh Como	Men's outdoor track and field	
70	2011–12	Calista Lyon	Women's outdoor track and field	
71	2015–16	Khalifah Rosser	Men's outdoor track and field	

At the NCAA Division I level, California State University, Los Angeles (CSU Los Angeles) has earned a total of 12 individual championships.

== Baseball faculty ==
=== Baseball field ===
The baseball field was renamed Reeder Field in 1972 to honor Coach Jim Reeder, who never had a losing season during his career. Reeder's untimely death in January 1972 left a lasting impact, and the renaming of the field celebrated his dedication and success in collegiate baseball.

=== John Herbold: ABCA Hall of Famer ===
On January 3, 1998, John Herbold, head baseball coach at Cal State LA, was inducted into the American Baseball Coaches Association (ABCA) Hall of Fame during the ABCA's national convention in San Diego, CA. Herbold later received recognition from Cal State LA Intercollegiate Athletics for becoming the baseball coach with the most wins in University history, having secured 398 victories since taking over as head coach in 1984. This achievement surpassed the previous record of 397 wins set by Jim Reeder, after whom the baseball field is named.
