= Kalamazoo Hornets =

- University: Kalamazoo College
- Conference: MIAA
- NCAA: III
- Football stadium: Angel Field
- Basketball arena: Anderson Athletic Center
- Baseball stadium: Woodworth Field
- Softball stadium: Kalamazoo Field
- Soccer stadium: MacKenzie Field
- Aquatics center: Kalamazoo Natatorium
- Tennis venue: Stowe Stadium (outdoor); Markin Center (indoor)
- Volleyball arena: Anderson Athletic Center
- Nickname: Hornets
- Fight song: "All Hail to Kazoo,"
- Colors: Orange and black
- Website: hornets.kzoo.edu
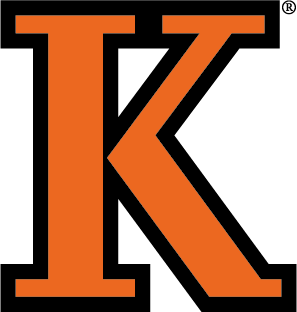

The Kalamazoo Hornets is the nickname of the intercollegiate athletic teams of Kalamazoo College. The school's teams compete in the NCAA's Division III and the Michigan Intercollegiate Athletic Association (MIAA).

As of 2016, the Hornet men's tennis squad has won its conference's championship 78 consecutive years. The Kalamazoo Hornets compete in the following sports:

== Sponsored sports ==
Men's sports	Women's sports
Baseball	Basketball
Basketball	Cross country
Cross country	Golf
Football	Lacrosse
Golf	Soccer
Lacrosse	Softball
Soccer	Swimming
Swimming	Tennis
Tennis	Track and field
Track and field	Volleyball

=== Men's basketball ===
In 2001, the men's basketball team was at the center of a lengthy dispute regarding the outcome of a January 20 game with league rival the Olivet Comets. With Olivet leading 70–69, Kalamazoo center, Kevin Baird, made a shot at the buzzer that was initially waved off by referees. The referees reviewed videotape of the game and determined that the player had, in fact, released his shot before the buzzer; they then awarded Kalamazoo a 71–70 victory. After the game, Olivet filed a protest with the conference commissioner, claiming that officials had misapplied the way in which videotape may be used. On January 23, the conference upheld the protest and awarded Olivet the victory. Kalamazoo then filed a protest with the NCAA, claiming that Olivet's protest was in violation of NCAA bylaws. On February 1, the NCAA upheld Kalamazoo's counter-protest and again awarded the game to the Hornets. The dispute between Olivet and Kalamazoo received national attention and the shot was shown repeatedly on ESPN.

=== Women's cross country ===
Allison Iott finished 10th in the 2008 NCAA D-3 Championship, earning USTFCCCA All-American honors in cross country. She was Kalamazoo's first-ever women's cross country MIAA conference meet champion and MIAA Conference MVP.

=== Football ===
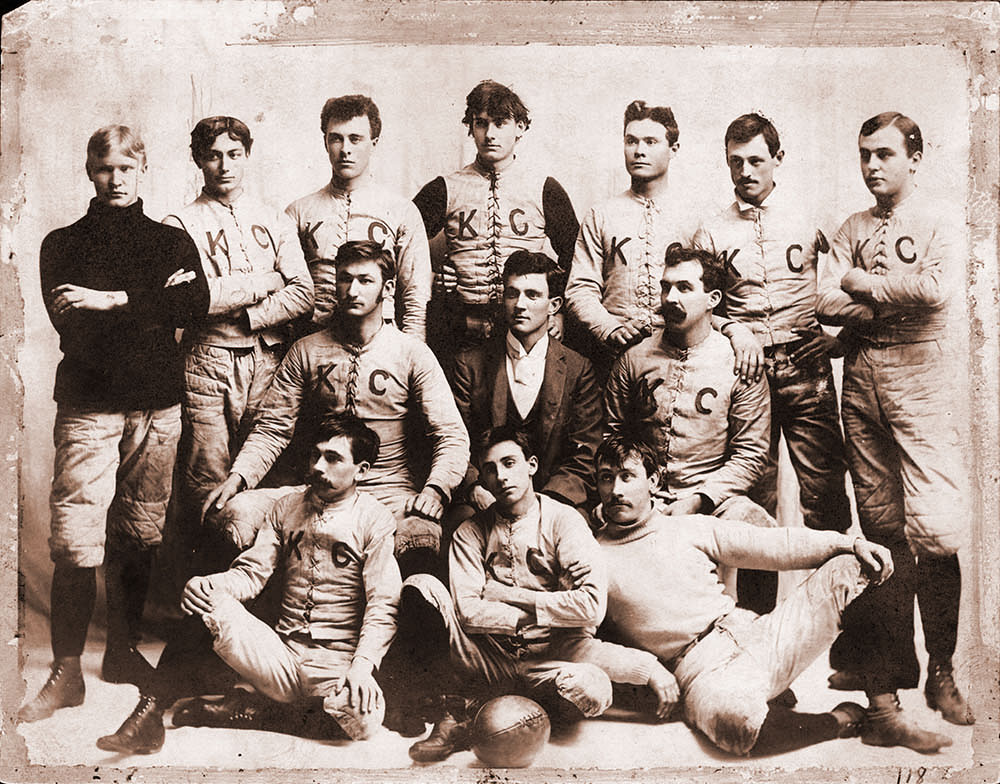
1892 Kalamazoo football team

College football has been played at Kalamazoo since 1892, when the school completed a record of 0 wins and 2 losses, both to the Olivet Comets. The school's first win came two years later in 1894 with a 16–4 victory over the Kalamazoo YMCA. It was 1895 before the school defeated another college football team, with a 12–8 victory over the Alma Scots.

In 1897, the first coach came to the program with Charles Hall, who led the team to a record of 7 wins and 1 loss, earning the Michigan Intercollegiate Athletic Association championship. The current coach is Jamie Zorbo.

=== Women's lacrosse ===
In the 2013–14 academic year, women's lacrosse became a varsity sport at Kalamazoo. It is the college's first new varsity athletic program since 1991. Women's lacrosse previously existed as one of Kalamazoo's student-run club sports. In Spring 2012, the school announced the new program, as well as the hiring of Emilia Ward for the position of head coach. Ward previously coached at Winthrop University, and Adrian College, after lettering four years in women's lacrosse at Manhattan College.

=== Men's swimming and diving ===
Men's swimming and diving at Kalamazoo has an impressive history. The team is known for producing individual national champions in the pool and on the boards, and also for maintaining a national presence with regular appearances as a top-10 team at the NCAA Division III national championships. Their highest finish was 4th in 2010. The swimming and diving team is the second most successful athletic program at Kalamazoo, after the men's tennis team, and it is also one of the top 10 most successful teams in the MIAA, with 27 championships.

=== Men's tennis ===
The Kalamazoo College men's tennis team has won 78 consecutive Michigan Intercollegiate Athletic Association championships (1936–2013) with a record of 426–3 in the MIAA from 1935 - 2007. Kalamazoo has won seven NCAA Division III national championships and has made 25 consecutive NCAA III tournament appearances.

National Championships

- NCAA Division III: 1976, 1978, 1986, 1987, 1991, 1992, 1993

National Runners-up

- NCAA Division III: 1982, 1985, 1997, 1997
- NCAA Division II: 1972

== Facilities ==
Venue	Sport(s)	Open.	Capac.	Ref
Angel Field	Football	1946	2,458	
Anderson Athletic Center	Basketball; Volleyball	1981	1,234	
Athletics Field Complex		1946	n/i	
Fitness & Wellness Center	Raquetball; Pickleball	2016	n/i	
MacKenzie Field	Soccer	1958	391	
Markin Tennis Center	Tennis (indoor)	1988	–	
Kalamazoo Natatorium	Swimming	2021	231	
Kalamazoo Softball Field	Softball	1998	240	
Woodworth Field	Baseball	1956	312	
Stowe Stadium	Tennis (outdoor)	1946	3,500	

== Fight song ==
The words to the college fight-song, "All Hail to Kazoo", were written by A. G. Walton (1911) with music by D. R. Belcher (1909), arranged by Burton Edward Fischer.
