= NCAA Division II women's tennis championship =

American collegiate tennis tournament

- Logo of the 2018 championships
- Association: NCAA
- Sport: College tennis
- Founded: 1982; 44 years ago
- Division: Division II
- No. of teams: 48
- Country: United States; Canada
- Most recent champion: Barry (9th)
- Most titles: Team: Nova Southeastern (2)
- Website: NCAA.com

The NCAA Division II women's tennis championship is contested at the annual tournament hosted by the National Collegiate Athletic Association to determine the team national champions of women's collegiate tennis among its Division II members institutions in the United States and Canada. It has been held annually since 1982.

From 1982 until 1994, the championship consisted of three championships, singles, doubles, and team, and the former two events were discontinued in 1995 and have not been reestablished.

Barry is the most successful program, with nine titles. Nova Southeastern are the reigning national champions, winning their 2nd title.

== History ==
Tennis was one of twelve women's sports added to the NCAA championship program for the 1981–82 school year, as the NCAA engaged in battle with the Association for Intercollegiate Athletics for Women for sole governance of women's collegiate sports. The AIAW continued to conduct its established championship program in the same twelve (and other) sports; however, after a year of dual women's championships, the NCAA conquered the AIAW and usurped its authority and membership.

== Champions ==
=== Singles, Doubles, and Team titles ===
NCAA Division II Women's Tennis Championship
Year	Site (Host)	Team Championship			Singles Champion	Doubles Champions
Year	Site (Host)	Winner	Score/Games	Runners-up	Singles Champion	Doubles Champions
1982; Details	Edwardsville, IL (SIU Edwardsville)	Cal State Northridge	15–13	Cal State Bakersfield	Iwona Kuczynska (Cal State Bakersfield)	Wendy Luhmann / Cindy Woodhouse (Cal State Northridge)
1983; Details	Pomona, CA (Cal Poly Pomona)	Tennessee–Chattanooga	5–4	UC Davis	Suzanne Kuhlman (Georgetown)	Sandra Elliott / Mary Gillach (Northern Colorado)
1984; Details	Chattanooga, TN (UT–Chattanooga)	Tennessee–Chattanooga (2)	8–1	SIU Edwardsville	Elisabeth Calander (SIU Edwardsville)	Sue McCulloch / Christine Picher (Tennessee–Chattanooga)
1985; Details	Bakersfield, CA (Cal State Bakersfield)	Tennessee–Chattanooga (3)	8–1	Notre Dame	Elisabeth Calander (SIU Edwardsville)	Sandra Elliott / Nancy Roe (Northern Colorado)
1986; Details	Northridge, CA (Cal State Northridge)	SIU Edwardsville	5–4	Cal State Northridge	Nancy Roe (Northern Colorado)	Sandra Elliott / Nancy Roe (Northern Colorado)
1987; Details	Northridge, CA (Cal State Northridge)	SIU Edwardsville (2)	5–4	Abilene Christian	Xenia Anastasiadou (Cal Poly Pomona)	Christina Bokelund / Portia George (SIU Edwardsville)
1988; Details	Rohnert Park, CA (Sonoma State)	SIU Edwardsville (3)	5–4	Cal Poly SLO	Xenia Anastasiadou (Cal Poly Pomona)	Christina Bokelund / Portia George (SIU Edwardsville)
1989; Details	Edwardsville, IL (SIU Edwardsville)	SIU Edwardsville (4)	5–4	UC Davis	Christina Bokelund (SIU Edwardsville)	Susan Wheeler / Layla DeStaffany (Air Force)
1990; Details	Davis, CA (UC Davis)	UC Davis	5–3	Cal Poly Pomona	Edna Olivarez (Cal State Los Angeles)	Edna Olivarez / Jennifer Choi (Cal State Los Angeles)
1991; Details	Davis, CA (UC Davis)	Cal Poly Pomona	5–3	UC Davis	Laura Simmons (Air Force)	Onnaca Heron / Cindy Hamnquist (Cal Poly Pomona)
1992; Details	Canyon, TX (West Texas State)	Cal Poly Pomona (2)	5–0	Grand Canyon	Michelle King (Abilene Christian)	Rebecca Galassini / Traci Guy (Grand Canyon)
1993; Details	Industry, CA	UC Davis (2)	5–1	Cal Poly	Lucie Ludvigova (Grand Canyon)	Mary Hirst / Lee Whitwell (Francis Marion)
1994; Details	Industry, CA	North Florida	6–0	Cal Poly Pomona	Stacy Moss (Rollins)	Mary Hirst / Lee Whitwell (Francis Marion)

=== Team title only ===
NCAA Division II Women's Tennis Championship
Year	Site (Host)	Team Championship		
Year	Site (Host)	Champion	Score/Games	Runners-up
1995; Details	Davis, CA (UC Davis)	Armstrong State	4–0	Grand Canyon
1996; Details	Edmond, OK (Central Oklahoma)	Armstrong State (2)	4–0	Abilene Christian
1997; Details	Springfield, MO	Lynn	5–4	Armstrong State
1998; Details	Springfield, MO	Lynn (2)	5–2	Armstrong State
1999; Details	Pensacola, FL (West Florida)	BYU–Hawaii	5–1	Armstrong State
2000; Details	Pensacola, FL (West Florida)	BYU–Hawaii (2)	5–0	Lynn
2001; Details	Pensacola, FL (West Florida)	Lynn (3)	5–3	BYU–Hawaii
2002; Details	Kansas City, MO	BYU–Hawaii (3)	5–1	Armstrong State
2003; Details	Altamonte Springs, FL (Rollins)	BYU–Hawaii (4)	5–3	Barry
2004; Details	Altamonte Springs, FL (Rollins)	BYU–Hawaii (5)	5–1	Barry
2005; Details	Altamonte Springs, FL (Rollins)	Armstrong State (3)	5–3	BYU–Hawaii
2006; Details	Kansas City, MO	BYU–Hawaii (6)	5–3	Armstrong State
2007; Details	Altamonte Springs, FL (Rollins)	BYU–Hawaii (7)	5–0	West Florida
2008; Details	Houston, TX	Armstrong State (4)	5–2	Lynn
2009; Details	Altamonte Springs, FL (Rollins)	Armstrong State (5)	5–2	Lynn
2010; Details	Altamonte Springs, FL (Rollins)	Armstrong State (6)	5–1	BYU–Hawaii
2011; Details	Altamonte Springs, FL (Rollins)	Barry	5–3	Lynn
2012; Details	Louisville, KY (Bellarmine)	Armstrong State (7)	5–2	BYU–Hawaii
2013; Details	Surprise, AZ	Armstrong State (8)	5–2	BYU–Hawaii
2014; Details	Altamonte Springs, FL (Rollins)	Barry (2)	5–4	Armstrong State
2015; Details	Surprise, AZ	Armstrong State (9)	5–2	Barry
2016; Details	Denver, CO (Metro State)	Armstrong State (10)	5–3	BYU–Hawaii
2017; Details	Altamonte Springs, FL (Rollins)	Barry (3)	5–0	Lynn
2018; Details	Surprise, AZ	Barry (4)	5–0	West Florida
2019; Details	Altamonte Springs, FL (Rollins)	Barry (5)	4–2	Lynn
2020; Details	Cancelled due to the COVID-19 pandemic			
2021; Details	Surprise, AZ	Barry (6)	4–0	Indianapolis
2022; Details	Altamonte Springs, FL	Barry (7)	4–1	Central Oklahoma
2023; Details	Orlando, FL	Barry (8)	4–1	Nova Southeastern
2024; Details	Orlando, FL	Nova Southeastern	4–2	Barry
2025; Details	Orlando, FL	Barry (9)	4–3	Nova Southeastern
2026; Details	Surprise, AZ	Nova Southeastern (2)	4–1	Catawba

== Champions ==
=== Team titles ===
==== Active programs ====
Team	Titles	Years
Barry	9	2011, 2014, 2017, 2018, 2019, 2021, 2022, 2023, 2025
Lynn	3	1997, 1998, 2001
Cal Poly Pomona	2	1991, 1992
Nova Southeastern	2	2024, 2026

==== Former programs ====
Team	Titles	Years
Armstrong State	10	1995, 1996, 2005, 2008, 2009, 2010, 2012, 2013, 2015, 2016
BYU Hawaii	7	1999, 2000, 2002, 2003, 2004, 2006, 2007
SIU Edwardsville	4	1986, 1987, 1988, 1989
Chattanooga	3	1983, 1984, 1985
UC Davis	2	1990, 1993
North Florida	1	1994
Cal State Northridge	1	1982

=== Singles titles ===
==== Active programs ====
Team	Titles
Cal Poly Pomona	2
Cal State Los Angeles	1
Rollins	1

==== Former programs ====
Team	Titles
SIU Edwardsville	3
Abilene Christian	1
Air Force	1
Cal State Bakersfield	1
Georgetown	1
Grand Canyon	1
Northern Colorado	1

=== Doubles titles ===
==== Active programs ====
Team	Titles
Francis Marion	2
Cal Poly Pomona	1
Cal State Los Angeles	1

==== Former programs ====
Team	Titles
Northern Colorado	3
SIU Edwardsville	2
Air Force	1
Cal State Northridge	1
Chattanooga	1
Grand Canyon	1

== See also ==
- NCAA Women's Tennis Championships (Division I, Division III)
- AIAW Intercollegiate Women's Tennis Champions
- NAIA Women's Tennis Championship
- NCAA Men's Tennis Championships (Division I, Division II, Division III)
