= NCAA Division III women's tennis championships =

American collegiate tennis tournament

- Logo of the most recent iteration of the championship
- Association: NCAA
- Sport: College tennis
- Founded: 1982; 44 years ago
- Division: Division III
- No. of teams: 48
- Country: United States
- Most recent champions: Team: Wesleyan (2nd)
- Most titles: Team: Williams (10)
- Website: NCAA.com

The NCAA Division III women's tennis championships are contested at the annual tournaments hosted by the National Collegiate Athletic Association (NCAA) to determine the nationals champions of women's team, singles, and doubles collegiate tennis among its Division III member programs in the United States. The championships have been held every year since 1982, except 2020.

Williams has won the most national championships, with 10 national titles.

Wesleyan are the reigning national champion, winning their second title in 2026.

== History ==
Tennis was one of twelve women's sports added to the NCAA championship program for the 1981–82 school year, as the NCAA engaged in battle with the Association for Intercollegiate Athletics for Women (AIAW) for sole governance of women's collegiate sports. The AIAW continued to conduct its established championship program in the same twelve (and other) sports; however, after a year of dual women's championships, the NCAA conquered the AIAW and usurped its authority and membership.

== Results ==
NCAA Division III Women's Tennis Championship
Year	Site (Host)		Team Championship			Singles Champion	Doubles Champions
Year	Site (Host)		Winner	Score/Games	Runners-up	Singles Champion	Doubles Champions
1982; Details	Jackson, MS		Occidental	18–15	UC San Diego	Beckie Donecker (Elizabethtown)	Kathleen McFadden / Jean Marie Sanders (Occidental)
1983; Details	Claremont, CA (Claremont-Mudd-Scripps)		Principia	17–13	UNC Greensboro	Jean Marie Sanders (Occidental)	Kristi Martin and Wendy Clark (Principia)
1984; Details	Kalamazoo, MI (Kalamazoo)		Davidson	15–14	UC San Diego	Courtney Allen (Principia)	Courtney Allen and Suzy Verheul (Principia)
1985; Details	Haverford, PA (Haverford)		UC San Diego	8–1	Davidson	Courtney Allen (Principia)	Jessica Vernon and Nadine Akimoto (UC San Diego)
1986; Details	Kalamazoo, MI (Kalamazoo)		Trenton State	6–3	Occidental	Debbie Daniel (Trenton State)	Courtney Allen and Sue Godfrey (Principia)
1987; Details	Kalamazoo, MI (Kalamazoo)		UC San Diego (2)	6–3	Occidental	Courtney Allen (Principia)	Courtney Allen and Sue Godfrey (Principia)
1988; Details	Atlanta, GA (Emory)		Mary Washington	7–2	Kenyon	Caroline Bodart (Menlo)	Julie Lindberg and Karen Nilsen (Pomona–Pitzer)
1989; Details	Claremont, CA (Claremont-Mudd-Scripps)		UC San Diego (3)	8–1	Kenyon	Caroline Bodart (Menlo)	Christine Behrens and Nancy Calhoun (UC San Diego)
1990; Details	Trenton, NJ (Trenton State)		Gustavus Adolphus	5–4	UC San Diego	Christine Behrens (UC San Diego)	Shelley Keeler and Caryn Cranstonn (Pomona–Pitzer)
1991; Details	Atlanta, GA (Emory)		Mary Washington (2)	5–4	Gustavus Adolphus	Karyn Cooper (Wellesley)	Shelley Keeler and Erin Hendricks (Pomona–Pitzer)
1992; Details	Kalamazoo, MI (Kalamazoo)		Pomona–Pitzer	5–4	Kenyon	Shelley Keeler (Pomona–Pitzer)	Shelley Keeler and Erin Hendricks (Pomona–Pitzer)
1993; Details	Northfield, MN (Carleton)		Kenyon	7–2	Gustavus Adolphus	Helen Motter (Middlebury)	Helen Motter and Nanci Olson (Middlebury)
1994; Details	Kalamazoo, MI (Kalamazoo)		UC San Diego (4)	7–2	Williams	Claire Turchi (Pomona–Pitzer)	Becky Mallory and Julie Greenwood (Williams)
1995; Details	Sweet Briar, VA (Sweet Briar)		Kenyon (2)	5–4	UC San Diego	Nao Kinoshita (Rhodes)	Marilyn Baker and Natalia Garcia (Washington and Lee)
1996; Details	Kalamazoo, MI (Kalamazoo)		Emory	5–1	Washington and Lee	Dina Dajani (Redlands)	Porter Harris and Julie Greenwood (Williams)
1997; Details	Claremont, CA (Pomona)		Kenyon (3)	6–3	Trinity (TX)	Nao Kinoshita (Rhodes)	Nao Kinoshita and Taylor Tarver (Rhodes)
1998; Details	Lexington, VA (Washington and Lee)		Skidmore	5–1	Kenyon	Jamie Levine (Skidmore)	Caryn Cuthbert and Erin Hockman (Kenyon)
1999; Details	Trenton, NJ (TCNJ)		Amherst	5–2	Williams	Cornelia Steinberg (Amherst)	Inke Noel and Lisa Powers (Skidmore)
2000; Details	St. Peter, MN (Gustavus Adolphus)		Trinity (TX)	5–4	UC San Diego	Jamie Cohen (Amherst)	Sheree Schwartz and Meghan Gould (Pomona–Pitzer)
2001; Details	San Antonio, TX (Trinity)		Williams	6–3	Trinity (TX)	Elena Blanina (Methodist)	Mary Ellen Gordon and Anusha Natarajan (Emory)
2002; Details	Sweet Briar, VA (Sweet Briar)		Williams (2)	6–3	Emory	Elena Blanina (Methodist)	Mary Ellen Gordon and Anusha Natarajan (Emory)
2003; Details	Redlands, CA (Redlands Bulldogs)		Emory (2)	5–1	Washington and Lee	Mary Ellen Gordon (Emory)	Mary Ellen Gordon and Jolyn Taylor (Emory)
2004; Details	Memphis, TN (Rhodes)		Emory (3)	5–0	Amherst	Mary Ellen Gordon (Emory)	Mary Ellen Gordon and Jolyn Taylor (Emory)
2005; Details	Kalamazoo, MI (Kalamazoo)		Emory (4)	5–3	Washington and Lee	Lindsay Hagerman (Washington and Lee)	Tara Houlihan and Lyndsey Palen (Gustavus Adolphus)
2006; Details	Santa Cruz, CA (UC Santa Cruz)		Emory (5)	5–1	Washington and Lee	Emily Applegate (Washington and Lee)	Tara Houlihan and Lyndsey Palen (Gustavus Adolphus)
2007; Details	Fredericksburg, VA (Mary Washington)		Washington and Lee	5–2	Amherst	Liz Bondi (DePauw)	Brittany Berckes and Alicia Menezes (Amherst)
2008; Details	St. Peter, MN (Gustavus Adolphus)		Williams (3)	5–4	Washington and Lee	Siobhan Finicane (Pomona–Pitzer)	Brittany Berckes and Alicia Menezes (Amherst)
2009; Details	Brookhaven, GA (Oglethorpe)		Williams (4)	5–2	Amherst	Lorne McManigle (Emory)	Chrissy Hu and Kendra Higgins (Chicago)
2010; Details	Fredericksburg, VA (Mary Washington)		Williams (5)	5–0	Emory	Julia Browne (Tufts)	Chrissy Hu and Kendra Higgins (Chicago)
2011; Details	Claremont, CA (Claremont-Mudd-Scripps)		Williams (6)	5–4	Amherst	Kristin Lim (Claremont–Mudd–Scripps)	Jordan Brewer and Gabby Devlin (Amherst)
2012; Details	Cary, NC (Meredith)		Williams (7)	5–2	Chicago	Gabrielle Clark (Emory)	Laura Danzig and Gabby Devlin (Amherst)
2013; Details	Kalamazoo, MI (Kalamazoo)		Williams (8)	5–2	Emory	Lok Sze Leung (Middlebury)	Jordan Brewer and Gabby Devlin (Amherst)
2014; Details	Claremont, CA (Claremont-Mudd-Scripps)		Emory (6)	5–1	Amherst	Gabrielle Clark (Emory)	Jordan Brewer and Gabby Devlin (Amherst)
2015; Details	Mason, OH (Ohio Northern)		Williams (9)	5–4	Emory	Eudice Chong (Wesleyan)	Juli Raventos / Linda Shin (Williams)
2016; Details	Kalamazoo, MI (Kalamazoo)		Emory (7)	5–4	Williams	Eudice Chong (Wesleyan)	Juli Raventos / Linda Shin (Williams)
2017; Details	Chattanooga, TN (Sewanee)		Williams (10)	5–4	Emory	Eudice Chong (Wesleyan)	Eudice Chong / Victoria Yu (Wesleyan)
2018; Details	Claremont, CA (Claremont-Mudd-Scripps)		Claremont-Mudd-Scripps	5–4	Emory	Eudice Chong (Wesleyan)	Julia Cancio / Juli Raventos (Williams)
2019; Details	Kalamazoo, MI (Kalamazoo)		Wesleyan	5–4	Claremont-Mudd-Scripps	Ysabel González-Rico (Emory)	Catherine Allen / Caroline Cox (Claremont–Mudd–Scripps)
2020; Details	St. Louis, MO (Washington University in St. Louis)		Cancelled due to the COVID-19 pandemic				
2021; Details	Claremont, CA (Claremont-Mudd-Scripps)		Emory (8)	5–0	Wesleyan	Erica Ekstrand (Williams)	Ysabel Gonzalez-Rico / Katie Chang (Emory)
2022; Details	Orlando, FL (Oglethorpe)		Claremont-Mudd-Scripps (2)	5–1	Chicago	Elle Christensen (Tufts)	Elle Christensen / Tilly Rigby (Tufts)
2023; Details	Orlando, FL (Oglethorpe)		Claremont-Mudd-Scripps (3)	5–4	Chicago	Angie Zhou (Pomona-Pitzer)	Brooke Despriet / Katherine Perry (Sewanee)
2024	St. Louis, MO (Washington–St. Louis)		Chicago	5–3	Wesleyan	Rena Lin (Chicago)	Matia Cristiani / Olivia Soffer (Babson)
2025	Claremont, CA (Claremont-Mudd-Scripps)		Washington–St. Louis	4–3	Pomona–Pitzer	Lindsay Eisenman (Claremont–Mudd–Scripps)	Matia Cristiani / Olivia Soffer (Babson)
2026	Chattanooga, TN (Sewanee)		Wesleyan (2)	4–1	Washington–St. Louis	Matia Cristiani (Babson)	Lindsay Eisenman / Rebecca Kong (Claremont–Mudd–Scripps)
2027	Claremont, CA (Claremont-Mudd-Scripps)	Claremont-Mudd-Scripps					

== Champions ==
=== Team titles ===
==== Active programs ====
Team	Titles
Williams	10
Emory	8
Kenyon	3
Claremont-Mudd-Scripps	3
Mary Washington	2
Wesleyan	2
Amherst	1
Chicago	1
Gustavus Adolphus	1
TCNJ	1
Occidental	1
Pomona–Pitzer	1
Principia	1
Skidmore	1
Trinity (TX)	1
Washington–St. Louis	1
Washington and Lee	1

==== Former programs ====
Team	Titles
UC San Diego	4
Davidson	1

=== Singles titles ===
==== Active programs ====
Team	Titles
Emory	6
Pomona–Pitzer	5
Wesleyan	5
Principia	3
Amherst	2
Methodist	2
Middlebury	2
Rhodes	2
Washington and Lee	2
Claremont-Mudd-Scripps	2
Babson	1
Chicago	1
DePauw	1
Elizabethtown	1
TCNJ	1
Occidental	1
Redlands	1
Skidmore	1
Tufts	1
Wellesley	1
Williams	1

==== Former programs ====
Team	Titles
Menlo	2
UC San Diego	1

=== Doubles titles ===
==== Active programs ====
Team	Titles
Amherst	6
Emory	5
Pomona–Pitzer	5
Williams	5
Principia	4
Chicago	2
Claremont-Mudd-Scripps	2
Gustavus Adolphus	2
Babson	2
Kenyon	1
Middlebury	1
Occidental	1
Rhodes	1
Sewanee	1
Skidmore	1
Tufts	1
Washington and Lee	1
Wesleyan	1

==== Former programs ====
Team	Titles
UC San Diego	2

== See also ==
- NCAA Women's Tennis Championships (Division I, Division II)
- NCAA Men's Tennis Championships (Division I, Division II, Division III)
- AIAW Intercollegiate Women's Tennis Champions
- NAIA Women's Tennis Championship
