= NCAA Division II men's tennis championship =

Annual tournament in the United States

- Logo of the 2018 championships
- Association: NCAA
- Sport: College tennis
- Founded: 1963; 63 years ago
- Division: Division II
- Country: United States; Canada
- Most recent champion: Team: Flagler (1st)
- Most titles: Team: Lander (8)
- Website: NCAA.com

The NCAA Division II men's tennis championship (formerly the NCAA College Division tennis championships) is contested at the annual tournament hosted by the National Collegiate Athletic Association to determine the team national champion of men's collegiate tennis among its Division II member programs in the United States and Canada. It has been held annually since 1963.

Unlike the men's tennis championships for Division I and Division III, this tournament crowns only a team champion (individual and doubles titles were contested from 1963 to 1994 before being discontinued).

Lander are the most successful program, with eight national titles.

Flagler are the current champions, winning their first national title in 2026.

== History ==
The championship first began in 1963 as the NCAA College Division Men's Tennis Championship for smaller colleges and universities not in the larger University Division (the precursor to the current Division I). The tournament gained its current name when the NCAA introduced its three-division structure in 1973–74. The national championship rounds are contested annually in May.

== Champions ==
=== Singles, Doubles, and Team (Points) Championships (1963–1982) ===
NCAA Division II Men's Tennis Championships (NCAA College Division Men's Tennis Championships, 1962–1973)
Year	Site (Host)	Team Championship				Singles Champion	Doubles Champions
Year	Site (Host)	Winner	Points	Runners-up	Points	Singles Champion	Doubles Champions
1963; Details	Saint Louis, MO	Cal State Los Angeles	9	Southern Illinois	7	Gil Rodriguez (Cal State Los Angeles)	Gil Rodriguez / John Lee (Cal State Los Angeles)
1964; Details	Greencastle, IN	Cal State Los Angeles (2); Southern Illinois	15	—		Gary Johnson (Cal State LA)	Don Gaynor / Lee Reid (UC Santa Barbara)
1965; Details	Los Angeles, CA	Cal State Los Angeles (3)	20	Redlands	16	Gary Johnson (Cal State LA)	John Yeomans / Bill Schoen (Redlands)
1966; Details	Sewanee, TN	Rollins	17	Cal State Los Angeles; Long Beach State	12	George Dickinson (UT–Chattanooga)	Fred Suessmann / Ken Stuart (Long Beach State)
1967; Details	Chicago, IL	Long Beach State	18	Lamar	14	Sherwood Stewart (Lamar)	Fred Suessmann / Dennis Trout (Long Beach State)
1968; Details	Fort Worth, TX	Fresno State	19	Cal State Los Angeles	14	Bob Delgado (Cal State Los Angeles)	Jim Powers / Gary Ogden (Fresno State)
1969; Details	East Stroudsburg, PA	Cal State Northridge	17	Northeast Missouri State	16	Steve Messmer (Cal State Northridge)	Steve Messmer / George Benedict (Cal State Northridge)
1970; Details	Hayward, CA	UC Irvine	25	Cal Poly	12	Earl O'Neill (UC Irvine)	Gregg Jablonski / Charles Nachand (UC Irvine)
1971; Details	Greencastle, IN	UC Irvine (2)	25	Rollins	22	Bob Chappell (UC Irvine)	Ron Lague / John Lowman (Rollins)
1972; Details	Greencastle, IN	UC Irvine (3); Rollins (2)	22	Kalamazoo	–	Charlie Owens (Samford)	John Lowman / Mike Strickland (Rollins)
1973; Details	East Stroudsburg, PA	UC Irvine (4)	28	Cal Poly	17	Bob Chappell (UC Irvine)	Bob Chappell / Glenn Cripe (UC Irvine)
1974; Details	Irvine, CA	San Diego	25	UC Irvine	20	Andy Rae (San Diego)	Andy Rae / Russell Watts (San Diego)
1975; Details	Irvine, CA	UC Irvine (5); San Diego (2)	22	CSU–Pueblo	–	Andy Rae (San Diego)	Scott Carnahan / Bob Wright (UC Irvine)
1976; Details	Maryville, MO	Hampton	23	UC Irvine	18	Tim Monroe (UC Davis)	Roger de Santis Guedes / Bruce Foxworth (Hampton)
1977; Details	San Diego, CA	UC Irvine (6)	20	SIU Edwardsville	15	Juan Farrow (SIU Edwardsville)	Jeff Williams / Curt Stalder (UC Irvine)
1978; Details	San Diego, CA	SIU Edwardsville	14	Hampton	12	Juan Farrow (SIU Edwardsville)	Par Svensson / Rick Goldberg (San Diego)
1979; Details	Little Rock, AR	SIU Edwardsville (2)	21	San Diego	15	Arjun Fernando (SIU Edwardsville)	Juan Farrow / Arjun Fernando (SIU Edwardsville)
1980; Details	Edwardsville, IL	SIU Edwardsville (3)	24	Nicholls State	12	Juan Farrow (SIU Edwardsville)	Juan Farrow / Hugo Núñez (SIU Edwardsville)
1981; Details	Little Rock, AR	SIU Edwardsville (4)	22	Rollins; Southwest Texas State	12	Ken Flach (SIU Edwardsville)	Brian Lusson / Bart Bernstein (Southwest Texas State)
1982; Details	Miami, FL	SIU Edwardsville (5)	22	Cal State Bakersfield	13	Ken Flach (SIU Edwardsville)	Ken Flach / Doug Burke (SIU Edwardsville)

=== Singles, Doubles, and Team (Bracket) Championships (1983–1994) ===
NCAA Division II Men's Tennis Championships
Year	Site (Host)	Team Championship			Singles Champion	Doubles Champions
Year	Site (Host)	Winner	Score/Games	Runners-up	Singles Champion	Doubles Champions
1983; Details	San Marcos, TX	SIU Edwardsville (6)	5–4	Southwest Texas State	Ken Flach (SIU Edwardsville)	Ken Flach / Robert Seguso (SIU Edwardsville)
1984; Details	San Marcos, TX	SIU Edwardsville (7)	5–4	Southwest Texas State	Steve Riza (Stephen F. Austin)	Johan Sjogren / Dave Delseni (SIU Edwardsville)
1985; Details	Northridge, CA	Chapman	5–4	Hampton	Brian Talgo (Rollins)	Tom Goles / Chris Langford (Stephen F. Austin)
1986; Details	Northridge, CA	Cal Poly	5–4	Chapman	Neil Smith (Stephen F. Austin)	Paul Landry / Bob Zoller (Cal Poly)
1987; Details	Northridge, CA	Chapman (2)	5–1	Hampton	Pat Emmet (Rollins)	Paul Wekesa / Barry Hancock (Chapman)
1988; Details	Rohnert Park, CA	Chapman (3)	5–2	Hampton	Miles Walker (Chapman)	Robert Green / Barry Pelts (Rollins)
1989; Details	Bolivar, MO	Hampton (2)	5–1	Cal Poly	Mark Billone (Bloomsburg)	Aga Soemarno / Kurt Hammerschmidt (Ferris State)
1990; Details	Edwardsville, IL	Cal Poly (2)	5–4	UC Davis	Luciano D’Andrea (UT Martin)	Luciano D’Andrea / Vesa Ponkka (UT Martin)
1991; Details	Edmond, OK	Rollins (3)	5–3	Cal Poly	Pradeep Raman (Armstrong Atlantic)	Mark Segesta / Dave Allen (UC Davis)
1992; Details	Edmond, OK	UC Davis	5–1	Hampton	Philipp Schertel (Armstrong Atlantic)	Steve Summer / Jeff McCann (UC Davis)
1993; Details	Edmond, OK	Lander	5–2	Hampton	Mark Segesta (UC Davis)	Steve Kobold / Oscar Mancisidor (Cal Poly Pomona)
1994; Details	Bolivar, MO	Lander (2)	5–3	Hampton	Roberto Cavalcante (Hampton)	Lee Holyoak / Brett Simpson (Lander)

=== Team Championship Only (1995–present) ===
NCAA Division II Men's Tennis Championships
Year	Site (Host)	Team Championship		
Year	Site (Host)	Champion	Score/Games	Runners-up
1995; Details	Davis, CA	Lander (3)	4–2	North Florida
1996; Details	Edmond, OK	Lander (4)	4–1	Rollins
1997; Details	Springfield, MO	Lander (5)	5–1	West Florida
1998; Details	Springfield, MO	Lander (6)	5–1	Barry
1999; Details	Pensacola, FL	Lander (7)	5–1	Barry
2000; Details	Pensacola, FL	Lander (8)	5–2	Hawaii Pacific
2001; Details	Pensacola, FL	Rollins (4)	5–0	Hawaii Pacific
2002; Details	Kansas City, MO	BYU Hawaii	5–4	Drury
2003; Details	Altamonte Springs, FL	BYU Hawaii (2)	5–4	Hawaii Pacific
2004; Details	Altamonte Springs, FL	West Florida	5–2	Valdosta State
2005; Details	Altamonte Springs, FL	West Florida (2)	5–0	North Florida
2006; Details	Kansas City, MO	Valdosta State	5–2	Lynn
2007; Details	Altamonte Springs, FL	Lynn	5–1	Valdosta State
2008; Details	Houston, TX	Armstrong Atlantic	5–0	Barry
2009; Details	Altamonte Springs, FL	Armstrong Atlantic (2)	5–4	Barry
2010; Details	Altamonte Springs, FL	Barry	5–4	Valdosta State
2011; Details	Altamonte Springs, FL	Valdosta State (2)	5–2	Barry
2012; Details	Louisville, KY	Armstrong Atlantic (3)	5–0	West Florida
2013; Details	Surprise, AZ	Barry (2)	5–4	Armstrong Atlantic
2014; Details	Altamonte Springs, FL	West Florida (3)	5–3	Hawaii Pacific
2015; Details	Surprise, AZ	Barry (3)	5–3	Hawaii Pacific
2016; Details	Denver, CO	Hawaii Pacific	5–3	Saint Leo
2017; Details	Altamonte Springs, FL	West Florida (4)	5–2	Barry
2018; Details	Surprise, AZ	Columbus State	5–4	Barry
2019; Details	Altamonte Springs, FL	Barry (4)	4–3	Columbus State
2020; Details	Cancelled due to the COVID-19 pandemic			
2021; Details	Surprise, AZ	Barry (5)	4–1	Columbus State
2022; Details	Altamonte Springs, FL	Barry (6)	4–1	Wayne State
2023; Details	Orlando, FL	Barry (7)	4–2	Columbus State
2024; Details	Orlando, FL	Valdosta State (3)	4–3	Flagler
2025; Details	Orlando, FL	Valdosta State (4)	4–2	Washburn
2026; Details	Surprise, AZ	Flagler	4–3	Barry

== Champions ==
=== Team titles ===
==== Active programs ====
Team	Titles	Years
Lander	8	1993, 1994, 1995, 1996, 1997, 1998, 1999, 2000
Barry	7	2010, 2013, 2015, 2019, 2021, 2022, 2023
West Florida	4	2004, 2005, 2014, 2017
Valdosta State	4	2006, 2011, 2024, 2025
Cal State Los Angeles	3	1963, 1964, 1965
Rollins	3	1966, 1972, 1991
Flagler	1	2026
Columbus State	1	2018
Hawaii Pacific	1	2016
Lynn	1	2007

==== Former programs ====
Team	Titles	Years
SIU Edwardsville	7	1978, 1979, 1980, 1981, 1982, 1983, 1984
UC Irvine	6	1970, 1971, 1972, 1973, 1975, 1977
Armstrong State	3	2008, 2009, 2012
Chapman	3	1985, 1987, 1988
BYU Hawaii	2	2002, 2003
Cal Poly	2	1986, 1990
Hampton	2	1976, 1989
San Diego	2	1974, 1975
UC Davis	1	1992
Cal State Northridge	1	1969
Fresno State	1	1968
Long Beach State	1	1967
Southern Illinois	1	1964

=== Singles titles ===
==== Active programs ====
Team	Titles
Cal State Los Angeles	4
Rollins	2
Bloomsburg	1

==== Former programs ====
Team	Titles
SIU Edwardsville	7
UC Irvine	3
Armstrong State	2
UC Davis	2
San Diego	2
Stephen F. Austin	2
Cal State Northridge	1
Chapman	1
Chattanooga	1
Hampton	1
Lamar	1
Samford	1
UT Martin	1

=== Doubles titles ===
==== Active programs ====
Team	Titles
Rollins	3
Cal Poly Pomona	1
Cal State Los Angeles	1
Ferris State	1
Lander	1

==== Former programs ====
Team	Titles
SIU Edwardsville	5
UC Irvine	4
UC Davis	2
Long Beach State	2
San Diego	2
UC Santa Barbara	1
Cal Poly	1
Cal State Northridge	1
Chapman	1
Fresno State	1
Hampton	1
Redlands	1
Stephen F. Austin	1
UT Martin	1
Texas State	1

- Schools highlighted in pink are closed or no longer sponsor athletics.
- Schools highlight in yellow have reclassified to another NCAA division.

== See also ==
- NCAA Men's Tennis Championships (Division I, Division III)
- NAIA Men's Tennis Championship
- NCAA Women's Tennis Championships (Division I, Division II, Division III)
