= NCAA Division III men's tennis championships =

American collegiate tennis tournament

- Logo of the most recent iteration of the championship
- Association: NCAA
- Sport: College tennis
- Founded: 1976; 50 years ago
- Division: Division III
- Country: United States
- Most recent champions: Team: Chicago (3rd)
- Most titles: Team: UC Santa Cruz (7); Kalamazoo (7)
- Website: NCAA.com

The NCAA Division III Men's Tennis Championship is an annual men's college tennis national collegiate championship sponsored by the National Collegiate Athletic Association (NCAA) for teams in Division III. Team, individual, and doubles championships are awarded each year.

UC Santa Cruz and Kalamazoo are the most successful men's Division III programs, with seven team titles each.

Chicago are the reigning team national champions, winning their third title in 2026.

== History ==
The championship first began in 1976 after the NCAA divided its membership into its current three-division system in 1973–74. The national championship rounds are contested annually in May.

== Champions ==
=== Singles, Doubles, and Team (Points) Championships ===
NCAA Division III Men's Tennis Championships
Year	Site (Host)	Team Championship				Singles Champion	Doubles Champions
Year	Site (Host)	Winner	Points	Runners-up	Points	Singles Champion	Doubles Champions
1976	Jackson, MS	Kalamazoo	18	Claremont-Mudd-Scripps	15	John Blomberg (Claremont-Mudd-Scripps)	Larry Davidson / John Irwin (Swarthmore)
1977	Jackson, MS	Swarthmore	15	Claremont-Mudd-Scripps	12	A.J. Shaka (Claremont-Mudd-Scripps)	Ben Johns / Stewart Jackson (Washington & Lee)
1978	Delaware, OH	Kalamazoo (2)	20	Washington & Lee	12	Chris Bussert (Kalamazoo)	Chris Bussert / Jim Hosner (Kalamazoo)
1979	Jackson, MS	Redlands	17	Gustavus Adolphus	13	Mark Tappan (Redlands)	Mike Capelouto / Ken Whitmer (Redlands)
1980	Claremont, CA	Gustavus Adolphus	14	Claremont-Mudd-Scripps	13	Chris Burns (Kalamazoo)	John Mattke / Paul Holbach (Gustavus Adolphus)
1981	Salisbury, MD	Claremont-Mudd-Scripps; Swarthmore (2)	9	—		Donovan Jones (Claremont-Mudd-Scripps)	Jim Hearn / Shaun Miller (Gustavus Adolphus)
1982	Kalamazoo, MI	Gustavus Adolphus (2)	19	Kalamazoo	14	Shaun Miller (Gustavus Adolphus)	Shaun Miller / Rich Skanse (Gustavus Adolphus)

=== Singles, Doubles, and Team (Bracket) Championships ===
NCAA Division III Men's Tennis Championship
Year	Site (Host)	Team Championship			Singles Champion	Doubles Champions
Year	Site (Host)	Winner	Score/Games	Runners-up	Singles Champion	Doubles Champions
1983	Albany, NY	Redlands (2)	5–4	Claremont-Mudd-Scripps	Erik Michelsen (Redlands)	Alex Gaeta / Bob Swartout (Rochester)
1984	Atlanta, GA	Redlands (3)	7–2	Gustavus Adolphus	Scott Moore (Redlands)	Eugene Jones / Dan Beers (UC San Diego)
1985	Lexington, VA	Swarthmore (3)	5–4	Kalamazoo	Toby Clark (Principia)	Jeff Krieger / Shep Davidson (Swarthmore)
1986	Claremont, CA	Kalamazoo (2)	6–3	Washington & Lee	Tim Corwin (Kalamazoo)	Jim Burda / Alex Palladino (Kalamazoo)
1987	Salisbury, MD	Kalamazoo (3)	6–3	Washington & Lee	Toby Clark (Principia)	Jim Burda / Alex Palladino (Kalamazoo)
1988	Lexington, VA	Washington & Lee	5–4	UC Santa Cruz	Noel Occomy (Brandeis)	Lance Au / Frank Hinman (Claremont-Mudd-Scripps)
1989	Kalamazoo, MI	UC Santa Cruz	5–4	Swarthmore	John Morris (Washington & Lee)	John Morris / Robert Matthews (Washington & Lee)
1990	Swarthmore, PA	Swarthmore (4)	5–1	UC Santa Cruz	Larry Gewer (Washington College)	John Morris / Bill Meadows (Washington & Lee)
1991	Claremont, CA	Kalamazoo (4)	7–2	UC Santa Cruz	Lewis Miller (Kalamazoo)	Dave Jussila / Ryan Skanse (Gustavus Adolphus)
1992	Atlanta, GA	Kalamazoo (5)	5–1	UC Santa Cruz	Lewis Miller (Kalamazoo)	Ryan McKee / Chris Noyes (Claremont-Mudd-Scripps)
1993	Kalamazoo, MI	Kalamazoo (6)	5–2	UC Santa Cruz	Ryan McKees (Claremont-Mudd-Scripps)	Tim Cooley / Ryan McKee (Claremont-Mudd-Scripps)
1994	Redlands, CA	Washington College	5–4	Claremont-Mudd-Scripps	Seth Denawetz (Kalamazoo)	Ron Ward / Jonathan Harper (UC Santa Cruz)
1995	Kalamazoo, MI	UC Santa Cruz (2)	4–1	Washington College	Damian Polla (Washington College)	Todd Born / John Weston (Redlands)
1996	Atlanta, GA	UC Santa Cruz (3)	4–2	Emory	Mark Ellis (Cal Lutheran)	Josh Vining / Jonathan Harper (UC Santa Cruz)
1997	Lexington, VA	Washington College (2)	4–2	Kalamazoo	Damian Polla (Washington College)	Mark Ellis / Jenia Karimov (Cal Lutheran)
1998	Williamstown, MA	UC Santa Cruz (4)	4–2	Williams	David Weisman (Babson)	Brian Cummings / Thomas Oechel (UC Santa Cruz)
1999	Claremont, CA	Williams	4–1	Kalamazoo	Thomas Oechel (UC Santa Cruz)	Brian Cummings / Thomas Oechel (UC Santa Cruz)
2000	Kalamazoo, MI	Trinity (TX)	4–3	Gustavus Adolphus	Kayvon Fatahalian (Carnegie Mellon)	Peter Gladkin / Thomas Oechel (UC Santa Cruz)
2001	Greencastle, IN	Williams (2)	4–1	UC Santa Cruz	Derek Fitzpatrick (UC Santa Cruz)	Derek Fitzpatrick / Nick Cunningham (UC Santa Cruz)
2002	Santa Cruz, CA	Williams (3)	4–3	Emory	Josh Lefkowitz (Williams)	John Michael Cham-A-Koon / Ivan Yeh (Claremont-Mudd-Scripps)
2003	St. Peter, MN	Emory	4–0	Williams	Eric Butorac (Gustavus Adolphus)	Eric Butorac / Kevin Whipple (Gustavus Adolphus)
2004	Lewiston, ME	Middlebury	4–3	Williams	Matt Seeberger (UC Santa Cruz)	Dan Uyar / Paul Bristow (Mary Washington College)
2005	Santa Cruz, CA	UC Santa Cruz (5)	4–1	Middlebury	Matt Seeberger (UC Santa Cruz)	Matt Seeberger / Matt Brunner (UC Santa Cruz)
2006	Fredericksburg, VA	Emory (2)	4–1	Middlebury	Will Boe-Wiegaard (Bates)	Shane Templeman / Matt Seeberger (UC Santa Cruz)
2007	St. Louis, MO	UC Santa Cruz (6)	5–1	Emory	Matt Seeberger (UC Santa Cruz)	Matt Seeberger / Max Ortiz (UC Santa Cruz)
2008	Lewiston, ME	Washington–St. Louis	5–3	Emory	Michael Greenberg (Williams)	Guillaume Schils / Larry Wang (Claremont-Mudd-Scripps)
2009	Claremont, CA	UC Santa Cruz (7)	5–0	Amherst	Michael Goodwin (Emory)	Amrit Ruspasinghe / Ben Stein (Bates)
2010	Oberlin, OH	Middlebury (2)	5–1	Amherst	John Watts (Washington–St. Louis )	Brian Pybas / Marc Vartabedian (UC Santa Cruz)
2011	Claremont, CA	Amherst	5–2	Emory	Chris Goodwin (Emory)	Oscar Pena / Stephen Sullivan (Bowdoin)
2012	Cary, NC	Emory (3)	5–3	Kenyon	Dillon Pottish (Emory)	Austin Chafetz / Luis Rattenhuber (Amherst)
2013	Kalamazoo, MI	Williams (4)	5–2	Claremont-Mudd-Scripps	Adam Putterman (Washington–St. Louis)	Elliot Kahler / Ian Wagner (Emory)
2014	Claremont, CA	Amherst (2)	5–3	Claremont-Mudd-Scripps	Joey Fritz (Amherst)	Eric Klawitter / Christopher Krimbill (Case Western Reserve)
2015	Lindner Family Tennis Center, Mason, OH	Claremont-Mudd-Scripps (2)	5–0	Middlebury	Warren Wood (Claremont-Mudd-Scripps)	Warren Wood / Joe Dorn (Claremont-Mudd-Scripps)
2016	Kalamazoo, MI	Bowdoin	5–0	Middlebury	Skylar Butts (Claremont-Mudd-Scripps)	Samuel Geier / Tristan Kaye (Kenyon)
2017	Chattanooga, TN	Emory (4)	5–2	Claremont-Mudd-Scripps	Lubomir Cuba (Middlebury)	Lubomir Cuba / William De Quant (Middlebury)
2018	Claremont, CA	Middlebury (3)	5–3	Bowdoin	Grant Ukren (Bowdoin)	Lubomir Cuba / Kyle Schlanger (Middlebury)
2019	Kalamazoo, MI (Kalamazoo)	Emory (5)	5–3	Claremont-Mudd-Scripps	Jonathan Jemison (Emory)	Jerry Jiang / Grant Ukren (Bowdoin)
2020	St. Louis, MO (Washington)	Cancelled due to the COVID-19 pandemic				
2021	Chattanooga, TN (Sewanee)	Emory (6)	5–2	Case Western Reserve	Leo Vithoontien (Carleton)	Leo Vithoontien /Xander Zuczek (Carleton)
2022	Orlando, FL (Oglethorpe)	Chicago	5-2	Case Western Reserve	Stan Morris (Middlebury)	James Hopper / Jonathan Powell (Case Western Reserve)
2023	Orlando, FL (Oglethorpe)	Case Western Reserve	5-2	Tufts	Rishabh Sharda (Tufts)	James Hopper / Vishwa Aduru (Case Western Reserve)
2024	St. Louis, MO (Washington–St. Louis)	Chicago (2)	5–4	Claremont-Mudd-Scripps	Tristan Bradley (Bowdoin)	Gage Gohl / Tyler Haddorff (Gustavus Adolphus)
2025	Claremont, CA (Claremont-Mudd-Scripps)	Denison	4–2	Case Western Reserve	Advik Mareedu (Claremont-Mudd-Scripps)	Andrei Leonov / Pat Otero (Chicago)
2026	Chattanooga, TN (Sewanee)	Chicago (3)	4–3	Claremont-Mudd-Scripps	Advik Mareedu (Claremont-Mudd-Scripps)	Ethan Green / Kael Shah (Denison)

== Champions ==
=== Team titles ===
Team	Titles
UC Santa Cruz	7
Kalamazoo	7
Emory	6
Swarthmore	4
Williams	4
Chicago	3
Middlebury	3
Redlands	3
Amherst	2
Gustavus Adolphus	2
Washington College	2
Claremont-Mudd-Scripps	2
Bowdoin	1
Case Western Reserve	1
Denison	1
Trinity (TX)	1
Washington University	1
Washington and Lee	1

=== Singles titles ===
Team	Titles
Claremont-Mudd-Scripps	8
Kalamazoo	6
UC Santa Cruz	5
Emory	4
Redlands	3
Washington College	3
Bowdoin	2
Gustavus Adolphus	2
Middlebury	2
Principia	2
Washington University	2
Babson	1
Bates	1
Brandeis	1
Cal Lutheran	1
Carleton	1
Carnegie Mellon	1
Kenyon	1
Tufts	1
Washington and Lee	1
Williams	1

=== Doubles titles ===
==== Active programs ====
Team	Titles
UC Santa Cruz	10
Claremont-Mudd-Scripps	6
Gustavus Adolphus	6
Kalamazoo	3
Case Western Reserve	3
Middlebury	3
Washington and Lee	3
Bowdoin	2
Redlands	2
Swarthmore	2
Amherst	1
Bates	1
Cal Lutheran	1
Carleton	1
Chicago	1
Denison	1
Emory	1
Kenyon	1
Mary Washington	1
Rochester	1

==== Former programs ====
Team	Titles
UC San Diego	1

== See also ==
- NCAA Men's Tennis Championships (Division I, Division II)
- NAIA Men's Tennis Championship
- NCAA Women's Tennis Championships (Division I, Division II, Division III)
