= USTA Southern California =

Tennis Organization

USTA Southern California, formerly known as the Southern California Tennis Association, is one of 17 sections that make up the United States Tennis Association. Each non-profit section represents various geographic locations around North America with the goal to support players and promote the growth of tennis across the United States. USTA Southern California has 40,000 members and more than 2,000 member organizations or tennis facilities. It consists of a staff of 32 and is headquartered on the campus of the University of California Los Angeles in Westwood, California, home of the Los Angeles Tennis Center. Currently, Southern California's top junior tennis players train in Carson, California, the home to the USTA Training Center – West. The Southern California section includes areas from the coast of San Diego to the south to the Central Coast to the north extending to San Luis Obispo County, east to Bakersfield, and including the Inland Empire and the Coachella Valley. USTA Southern California works with various organizations such as the City of Angels to provide free adaptive and wheelchair tennis lessons throughout Southern California. Southern California resident Brad Parks is largely credited with starting the sport of wheelchair tennis in the mid-1970s after suffering a skiing accident.

== History ==
The Southern California Tennis Association held its first tournament in 1887 the Southern California Championships in Santa Monica. The first men's singles champion was William Henry Young, who won both tournaments contested in 1887, one at the Casa Blanca Club in Riverside, and the other at the Casino courts in Santa Monica. The USTA Southern California is a major sponsor of the Ojai Tennis Tournament. Started in 1896 by William Thacher, The Ojai continues today in Ojai's downtown Libbey Park, a public facility where freshly squeezed Orange juice and tea are still served each afternoon during tournament matches.

The Pacific Southwest Tennis Tournament was first played at the Los Angeles Tennis Club in 1927 and won by Bill Tilden.

In anticipation of the 1984 Olympics taking place in Los Angeles, UCLA and the SCTA combined to build a new tennis complex that would be used for the Olympic matches, the Bruins tennis team and the Los Angeles Open men's event. The SCTA, UCLA and the Los Angeles Olympic Organizing Committee combined to raise funds for the building of the Los Angeles Tennis Center. For many years the L.A. Tennis Club was the home of the Southern California Tennis Association offices before moving to the UCLA campus.

In 1986, the SoCal Tennis Foundation was founded as the charitable arm of the USTA Southern California. Its mission is “To advance the enjoyment, awareness, and participation of tennis to make a positive impact on communities and the lives of people of all ages, ability, ethnicity, and economic background in Southern California.” In the early part of 2021, USTA Southern California announced the hiring of former Pete Sampras and Roger Federer coach Paul Annacone to help develop top junior players into future pros.

== Tournaments ==
USTA Southern California hosts many junior, collegiate, open-level, professional and senior tournaments throughout the year. Formerly the Pacific Southwest Championships, the men's ATP Los Angeles Open was sold to a group from Colombia in 2012. The women's WTA Southern California Open was also sold and was relocated to Tokyo, Japan in 2014. In 2019, the USTA Southern California created the Signature Series consisting of eight tournaments and promoted as the “Grand Slams" of SoCal. They include: Tennis On Campus Sectional Championships (February), International Open of Southern California – IOSC (March), Southern California Super-Sectional Championship (Spring), Southern California Junior Sectional Championships (June), Open Sectional Championships (July), Southern California Intercollegiate Championships (October), Junior Doubles Sectional Championships (November), Final 8 Junior Masters Championships (November). In 2021 it was announced that tennis manufacturer Tecnifibre would become the official ball sponsor of the Signature Series. Other notable tournaments past and present include:

=== Current ===
- Indian Wells Open
- USTA Girls 18s National Championships
- Ojai Tennis Tournament
- Maze Cup
- Junior Sectionals
- Easter Bowl
- Southern California Intercollegiate Championships (1957-current)

=== Former ===
- Amex San Diego Satellite (1979) (men's)
- Anaheim Open, (1968–70), (combined)
- Los Angeles City Championships, (combined) (1913-32)
- Los Angeles International, (1970–72), (mens)
- Los Angeles Metropolitan Championships, (combined) (1933-73)
- Los Angeles Open, (1993–2012), (men)
- Los Angeles Public Parks Championships, (1953–1972), (combined)
- March of Dimes Championships, (1955–68), (combined)
- March of Dimes Open (1969–74), (combined)
- Pacific Southwest Championships, (1927–1968), (combined)
- Pacific Southwest Open (1969–1992) (men's)
- Santa Barbara International, (1977), (mens)
- Santa Barbara Open, (1908–61) (combined)
- San Diego Metropolitan Championships, (1954–1970), (combined)
- Santa Monica Championships, (1929–1973) (combined)
- Southern California Championships, (combined)
- Southern California Clay Court Championships, (combined)
- Southern California Indoor Championships, (combined)
- Southern California Mid-Winter Championships, (1893–1953), (combined)
- Southern California Open, (women)

== Notable players ==
May Sutton Bundy was Southern California's first big international tennis star. A U.S. Nationals champion at age 17, Sutton in 1905 became the first American player to win Wimbledon. The 1930 and 1940s gave way to prominent players such as Gene Mako, Jack Tidball, Joe Hunt, Jack Kramer and Bobby Riggs, who all groomed their games at the Los Angeles Tennis Club under the guidance of “Mr. Secretary” Perry T. Jones. Stan Smith of Pasadena, California, and Billie Jean King of Long Beach, California, both played their college tennis in Southern California for USC and Cal-State Los Angeles, respectively. King famously beat 55-year-old Bobby Riggs in the Battle of the Sexes in 1973. The USTA National Tennis Center is named after King and is the home of the US Open and Arthur Ashe Stadium, named after the former UCLA star from the 1960s. During the tennis boom in the 1970s, the Kramer Club in Rolling Hills Estates, Calif., was home to champions such as Tracy Austin, Pete Sampras and Lindsay Davenport.

Sisters Venus Williams and Serena Williams were raised on public courts in Compton, Calif., and have gone on to record-setting careers. In the summer of 2020, the all-time winningest doubles team in the history of tennis Mike and Bob Bryan from Camarillo, Calif., announced their retirement from tennis.

== Hall of Fame ==
USTA Southern California is home to many of the top tennis players in history and former Grand Slam champions. There are currently 94 members of the USTA Southern California Hall of Fame, which includes 2015 inductees Lindsay Davenport and Michael Chang. The last induction ceremony took place in 2017 and included the likes of “The Rocket” Rod Laver, Bobby Riggs and longtime executive director Henry Talbert. There is also a USTA Southern California Senior Tennis Hall of Fame. Previous notable inductees include Bob Sherman, Dodo Cheney, Ben Press, and Evelyn Houseman. The annual junior sportsmanship awards are named after Houseman.

| Year | Inductees |
|---|---|
| 2017 | Jim & Annette Buck, Debbie Graham, Rod Laver, William Kellogg, Robert Kramer, Stella Sampras, Ken Stuart, Helen Pastall Perez, Herb Flam, Bobby Riggs, Henry Talbert |
| 2015 | Kathy Bryan, Wayne Bryan, Jeanie Buss, Jerry Buss, Bill Rombeau, Brain Teacher, Pam Teeguarden |
| 2013 | Vic Braden, Michael Chang, Lindsay Davenport, Rick Leach, Gilbert Shea, Kathy Willette |
| 2011 | Pat Canning Todd, Dorothy Head Knode, Billie Jean King, Franklin Johnson, Dick Leach, Billy Martin, Kathy May Fritz, Hugh Stewart |
| 2009 | Robert Falkenburg, Peggy Michel, Bob Lutz, Robert Lansdorp, Patricia Yeomans, Stan Smith |
| 2007 | Darlene Hard, Gussie Moran, Charlie Pasarell, Dennis Ralston, Ted Schroeder, Pam Shriver |
| 2005 | Tracy Austin, Glenn Bassett, Beverly Baker Fleitz, Pancho Gonzalez, Pancho Segura |
| 2002 | Louise Brough Clapp, Jon Douglas, Carl Earn, Allen Fox, Karen Hantze Susman |
| 2000 | Alex Olmedo, Brad Parks, Leonard Straus, George Toley |
| 1998 | Joe Bixler, Jack Kramer |
| 1992 | Dorothy Cheney, Joe Hunt, Robert J. Kelleher, William S. Kellogg, Gene Mako, Alice Marble |
| 1976 | Ethel Sutton Bruce, Violet Sutton Hope-Doeg, Elizabeth Ryan, Florence Sutton |
| 1973 | William Henry |
| 1972 | May Sutton Bundy, Ellsworth Vines |
| 1971 | Eloise Watson Bekins, Claude Wayne |
| 1970 | Perry T. Jones |
| 1969 | Maureen Connolly, Maurice McLoughlin, Rafael Osuna |
| 1968 | Alphonso Bell, James Bettner, Tom Bundy, Edward Dickson, Marion Jones Farquhar, William May Garland, Grace Gilliland, Isaac Jones, Crawford Kent, Simpson Sinsabaugh, Reese Taylor, William Thacher, Archibald Way, Gerald Young, William Young |

== Future location ==
The USTA Southern California headquarters will move to the Carol Kimmelman Athletic and Academic Campus to be built on 90 acres in Carson, Calif. Carol Kimmelman was a former USC walk-on who was on the Trojans’ 1983 national championship team. Kimmelman was an educator, before her death from ovarian cancer in 2017. The state-of-the-art academic center will feature multiple tennis courts and will also include full-size soccer fields, basketball courts, track and field, fitness and play areas.
