= Dan Magill =

American tennis coach (born 1921)

- Born: Daniel Hamilton Magill Jr. January 25, 1921; Athens, Georgia, US
- Died: August 23, 2014 (aged 93); Athens, Georgia, US
- Burial place: Oconee Hill Cemetery
- Education: University of Georgia (ABJ)
- Occupations: Journalist, sports information director, tennis head coach
- Years active: 1945–1995
- Known for: * Support for the University of Georgia Bulldogs; * 706 career coaching victories (most by any coach in NCAA history)
- Spouse: Rosemary Reynaud Magill (m. 1945)
- Children: 3
- Awards: * Inductee Collegiate Tennis Hall of Fame; * Inductee Southern Tennis Foundation Hall of Fame; * Inductee Georgia Sports Hall of Fame; * Sanford Stadium press box named for him; * Sports Illustrated best mascot Uga V named for him; * Resolution by the Georgia State Senate honoring him; * Commendation from the Garden Club of America; * Elected to UGA Circle of Honor; * UGA tennis complex named for him
- Military career
- Branch: U.S. Marine Corps
- Service years: 1941–1945
- Rank: Captain
- Conflicts: Pacific theater of World War II
- Coaching career

Coaching career (HC unless noted)

Tennis
- 1954–1988: Georgia

Head coaching record
- Overall: 706–183

Accomplishments and honors

Championships
- National (1985, 1987); SEC (13 outdoor, 8 indoor)

Awards
- Collegiate Tennis Hall of Fame

Records
- Most wins by any coach in NCAA history

Daniel Hamilton Magill Jr. (January 25, 1921 – August 23, 2014) was an American journalist, sports administrator, and tennis head coach known for his association with the University of Georgia Bulldogs.

== Early life, education and family ==
Born and raised in Athens, Georgia, Magill's association with the Bulldogs began with his job as bat boy for the baseball team and manager of the tennis courts while in high school. While at the University of Georgia, he competed as a varsity athlete for the tennis team and swim team and volunteered his services as assistant football coach to Harry Mehre. He was a member of Chi Psi fraternity and earned his Bachelor of Arts in Journalism (ABJ) from the university's prestigious Henry W. Grady College of Journalism and Mass Communication in 1941 before entering the Marine Corps where he obtained the rank of captain and served in the Pacific theater of World War II.

An avid table tennis player, Magill set the Guinness World Record for the longest table tennis point in 1936 at 118 minutes. He also set the record as the fastest two-finger typist at 148 words per minute.

Magill married the former Rosemary Reynaud, who was born in Baton Rouge, Louisiana, was a Phi Beta Kappa graduate of the University of Georgia, and they had three children, five grandchildren, and nine great-grandchildren.

== Professional career ==
Following his time in military service, Magill wrote for the Atlanta Journal, serving as the Prep Sports editor of the newspaper that "Covers Dixie Like the Dew." A natural promoter, Magill built up the Georgia high school all-star football game each year and watched as it drew record crowds. Magill also managed to bring pitchers from the previous year's World Series game (Spud Chandler of the New York Yankees and Whitlow Wyatt of the Brooklyn Dodgers, both former Bulldogs) to manage the teams in a Georgia high school all-star baseball game.

In 1949, Magill returned to Athens to take the job of sports information director for the university. His passion for the Bulldogs was evident as he personally covered every sport on campus. In the 1950s, the Bulldog football team was struggling under legendary coach Wally Butts. And as the wins became fewer, so did the number of people in the stands. To help out his alma mater, Magill traveled all over Georgia, setting up Bulldog Clubs along the way. He also founded The Georgia Bulldog newspaper in 1950. Before long, nearly half of Georgia's counties had local chapters of Magill's club, and interest in the Bulldogs soared. Magill continued to serve as executive secretary of the club for decades.

In 1954, Magill became Head Coach of the struggling Bulldog Tennis program. He held the title for the next 34 years, building the program with a 706–183 record (most wins by any coach in NCAA history), 13 Southeastern Conference outdoor championships, 8 SEC indoor championships, and 2 national championships. In addition, he built UGA's tennis complex and brought the Intercollegiate Tennis Association (ITA) Collegiate Tennis Hall of Fame to Athens, which was named in his honor. He persuaded Kenny Rogers and Marianne Rogers to donate the funds for the Hall of Fame building. He was inducted into the Georgia Sports Hall of Fame in 1976.

== Controversy ==
Magill was also central to a controversy surrounding the 1943 and 1944 football games played between Georgia and Georgia Tech. Georgia Tech soundly defeated Georgia in 1943 by a score of 48–0 and in 1944 by a score of 44–0. Many years after the games were played, Dan Magill ruled that the games should not be counted because the Georgia teams were depleted by World War II and Georgia Tech used players from a nearby U.S. Navy officer training school. On the record books of Georgia the games are not counted, whereas they are counted in the record by Georgia Tech. Georgia still recognizes all other games played by the 1943 and 1944 Bulldog squads, but not the games against Georgia Tech because it used U.S. Navy officer training school players.

== Retirement and legacy ==
After coaching, Magill was Director of Tennis. He officially retired from the university in 1995, leaving behind a legacy like no other. In his honor, the press box at Georgia's famous Sanford Stadium was named for him and a plaque with his biography is mounted alongside Bulldog greats such as Vince Dooley, Fran Tarkenton, Wally Butts, and Frank Sinkwich, to name a few. His seat assignment in the press box reads, "Dan Magill - Legend."

Uga V, Georgia's mascot from 1990 to 1999, carried the official name of "Uga IV's Magillicuddy II" in honor of Magill. The bulldog was featured on the cover of Sports Illustrated in 1997 and was named the best mascot in college sports in the same publication. Uga V had previously garnered national attention when he lunged at Auburn football player Robert Baker in a four-overtime Georgia victory in 1996.

Perhaps one of the greatest testaments to Magill's contribution to the University of Georgia is that today nearly 50 people do the jobs that he once did on his own. His successor as tennis coach, Manuel Diaz has continued the high quality of the tennis program. Magill's passion for the school continued as he served as curator of the Dan Magill ITA Collegiate Tennis Hall of Fame and personally gave tours of the complex. He also wrote regular columns for the Athens Banner Herald (and provided each sports department staffer with a Claxton fruitcake at Christmas), maintained his health by playing tennis regularly, and was well known for his gardening abilities (he received a commendation from the Garden Club of America). Magill's interest, dedication, and passion for gardening was evident in the grounds surrounding his home in the Athens area.

== Death ==
Magill died at the age of 93 at an assisted-living facility in Athens, Georgia, on August 23, 2014.
