= NCAA Men's Tennis Championship =

American annual intercollegiate tournaments (1883– )

The NCAA Men's Tennis Championships are annual tournaments held in the spring to crown team, singles, and doubles champions in American college tennis. The first intercollegiate championship was held in 1883 by the Intercollegiate Lawn Tennis Association, 23 years before the founding of the National Collegiate Athletic Association (NCAA), with Harvard's Joseph Clark taking the singles title. The same year Clark partnered with Howard Taylor to win the doubles title. The first NCAA championship was conducted in 1946.

Since 1963, the NCAA organizes separate tournaments for Division I and II. A tournament for Division III was added in 1973. The NCAA discontinued the Division II singles and doubles championships in 1995.

From 1946 to 1976, players' individual performances were awarded points which were tallied to determine the NCAA "team" champion. In 1977, the NCAA began a dual-match single-elimination team tournament with 16 schools to determine the team championship. Subsequently, expanded to include byes for 12 teams in the first round, the team tournament adopted its current 64-team single-elimination format in 1999.

Texas Christian University won the Division I national team championship in 2024, defeating the University of Texas at Austin in the final. Alabama's Filip Planinsek captured the singles championship, and Ohio State's JJ Tracy and Robert Cash won the doubles championship. Valdosta State University won the Division II national championship. The University of Chicago won the Division III national team championship.

The 2024–25 school year is the first of a two-year trial in which the Division I men's and women's championships will operate in a split-season format, with singles and doubles championships held in the fall and team championships in the spring.

== Team champions ==
Division I			Division II			Division III		
Year	School	Coach	Year	School	Coach	Year	School	Coach
1946	USC	William Moyle	not contested			not contested		
1947	William & Mary	Sharvey G. Umbeck	not contested			not contested		
1948	William & Mary (2)	Sharvey G. Umbeck	not contested			not contested		
1949	San Francisco	Norman Brooks	not contested			not contested		
1950	UCLA	J.D. Morgan	not contested			not contested		
1951	USC (2)	Louis Wheeler	not contested			not contested		
1952	UCLA (2)	J.D. Morgan	not contested			not contested		
1953	UCLA (3)	J.D. Morgan	not contested			not contested		
1954	UCLA (4)	J.D. Morgan	not contested			not contested		
1955	USC (3)	George Toley	not contested			not contested		
1956	UCLA (5)	J.D. Morgan	not contested			not contested		
1957	Michigan	William Murphy	not contested			not contested		
1958	USC (4)	George Toley	not contested			not contested		
1959	Tulane; Notre Dame	Thomas Fallon; Emmet Pare	not contested			not contested		
1960	UCLA (6)	J.D. Morgan	not contested			not contested		
1961	UCLA (7)	J.D. Morgan	not contested			not contested		
1962	USC (5)	George Toley	not contested			not contested		
1963	USC (6)	George Toley	1963	Cal State LA	Scotty Deeds	not contested		
1964	USC (7)	George Toley	1964	Cal State LA (2)	John Eckendorf	not contested		
1964	USC (7)		1964	Southern Illinois	Carl Sexton	not contested		
1965	UCLA (8)	J.D. Morgan	1965	Cal State LA (3)	Scotty Deeds	not contested		
1966	USC (8)	George Toley	1966	Rollins	Norm Copeland	not contested		
1967	USC (9)	George Toley	1967	Long Beach State	Dan Campbell	not contested		
1968	USC (10)	George Toley	1968	Fresno State	Richard Murray	not contested		
1969	USC (11)	George Toley	1969	Cal State Northridge	Dave Sterle	not contested		
1970	UCLA (9)	Glenn Bassett	1970	UC Irvine	Myron McNamara	not contested		
1971	UCLA (10)	Glenn Bassett	1971	UC Irvine (2)	Myron McNamara	not contested		
1972	Trinity (TX)	Clarence Mabry	1972	UC Irvine (3)	Myron McNamara	not contested		
1972	Trinity (TX)	Clarence Mabry	1972	Rollins (2)	Norm Copeland	not contested		
1973	Stanford	Dick Gould	1973	UC Irvine (4)	Myron McNamara	not contested		
1974	Stanford (2)	Dick Gould	1974	San Diego	Hans Wichary	not contested		
1975	UCLA (11)	Glenn Bassett	1975	UC Irvine (5)	Myron McNamara	not contested		
1975	UCLA (11)	Glenn Bassett	1975	San Diego (2)	Hans Wichary	not contested		
1976	USC (12)	George Toley	1976	Hampton	Robert Screen	1976	Kalamazoo	George Acker
1976	UCLA (12)	Glenn Bassett	1976	Hampton	Robert Screen	1976	Kalamazoo	George Acker
1977	Stanford (3)	Dick Gould	1977	UC Irvine (6)	Myron McNamara	1977	Swarthmore	William Cullen
1978	Stanford (4)	Dick Gould	1978	SIU Edwardsville	Kent DeMars	1978	Kalamazoo (2)	George Acker
1979	UCLA (13)	Glenn Bassett	1979	SIU Edwardsville (2)	Kent DeMars	1979	Redlands	Jim Verdieck
1980	Stanford (5)	Dick Gould	1980	SIU Edwardsville (3)	Kent DeMars	1980	Gustavus Adolphus	Steve Wilkinson
1981	Stanford (6)	Dick Gould	1981	SIU Edwardsville (4)	Kent DeMars	1981	Claremont-Mudd-Scripps	Hank Krieger
1981	Stanford (6)	Dick Gould	1981	SIU Edwardsville (4)	Kent DeMars	1981	Swarthmore (2)	Michael Mullan
1982	UCLA (14)	Glenn Bassett	1982	SIU Edwardsville (5)	Kent DeMars	1982	Gustavus Adolphus (2)	Steve Wilkinson
1983	Stanford (7)	Dick Gould	1983	SIU Edwardsville (6)	Kent DeMars	1983	Redlands (2)	Jim Verdieck
1984	UCLA (15)	Glenn Bassett	1984	SIU Edwardsville (7)	Kent DeMars	1984	Redlands (3)	Jim Verdieck
1985	Georgia	Dan Magill	1985	Chapman	Mike Edles	1985	Swarthmore (3)	Michael Mullan
1986	Stanford (8)	Dick Gould	1986	Cal Poly	Hugh Bream	1986	Kalamazoo (3)	George Acker
1987	Georgia (2)	Dan Magill	1987	Chapman (2)	Mike Edles	1987	Kalamazoo (4)	George Acker
1988	Stanford (9)	Dick Gould	1988	Chapman (3)	Mike Edles	1988	Washington & Lee	Gary Franke
1989	Stanford (10)	Dick Gould	1989	Hampton (2)	Robert Screen	1989	UC Santa Cruz	Bob Hansen
1990	Stanford (11)	Dick Gould	1990	Cal Poly (2)	Kevin Platt	1990	Swarthmore (4)	Michael Mullan
1991	USC (13)	Dick Leach	1991	Rollins (3)	Norm Copeland	1991	Kalamazoo (5)	George Acker
1992	Stanford (12)	Dick Gould	1992	UC Davis	John Nelson	1992	Kalamazoo (6)	George Acker
1993	USC (14)	Dick Leach	1993	Lander	Joe Cabri	1993	Kalamazoo (7)	George Acker
1994	USC (15)	Dick Leach	1994	Lander (2)	Joe Cabri	1994	Washington (MD)	Tim Gray
1995	Stanford (13)	Dick Gould	1995	Lander (3)	Joe Cabri	1995	UC Santa Cruz (2)	Bob Hansen
1996	Stanford (14)	Dick Gould	1996	Lander (4)	Joe Cabri	1996	UC Santa Cruz (3)	Bob Hansen
1997	Stanford (15)	Dick Gould	1997	Lander (5)	Joe Cabri	1997	Washington (MD) (2)	Matt Rose
1998	Stanford (16)	Dick Gould	1998	Lander (6)	Joe Cabri	1998	UC Santa Cruz (4)	Bob Hansen
1999	Georgia (3)	Manuel Diaz	1999	Lander (7)	Joe Cabri	1999	Williams	Dave Johnson
2000	Stanford (17)	Dick Gould	2000	Lander (8)	Joe Cabri	2000	Trinity (TX) (2)	Butch Newman
2001	Georgia (4)	Manuel Diaz	2001	Rollins (4)	Jim Poling	2001	Williams (2)	Dave Johnson
2002	USC (16)	Dick Leach	2002	BYU–Hawaii	David Porter	2002	Williams (3)	Dave Johnson
2003	Illinois	Craig Tiley	2003	BYU–Hawaii	David Porter	2003	Emory	John Browning
2004	Baylor	Matt Knoll	2004	West Florida	Derrick Racine	2004	Middlebury	David Schwarz
2005	UCLA (16)	Billy Martin	2005	West Florida (2)	Derrick Racine	2005	UC Santa Cruz (5)	Bob Hansen
2006	Pepperdine	Adam Steinberg	2006	Valdosta State	John Hansen	2006	Emory (2)	John Browning
2007	Georgia (5)	Manuel Diaz	2007	Lynn	Mike Perez	2007	UC Santa Cruz (6)	Bob Hansen
2008	Georgia (6)	Manuel Diaz	2008	Armstrong	Simon Earnshaw	2008	Washington (MO)	Roger Follmer
2009	USC (17)	Peter Smith	2009	Armstrong	Simon Earnshaw	2009	UC Santa Cruz (7)	Bob Hansen
2010	USC (18)	Peter Smith	2010	Barry	George Samuel	2010	Middlebury (2)	David Schwarz
2011	USC (19)	Peter Smith	2011	Valdosta State (2)	John Hansen	2011	Amherst	Chris Garner
2012	USC (20)	Peter Smith	2012	Armstrong (3)	Simon Earnshaw	2012	Emory (3)	John Browning
2013	Virginia	Brian Boland	2013	Barry (2)	George Samuel	2013	Williams (4)	Dan Greenberg
2014	USC (21)	Peter Smith	2014	West Florida (3)	Derrick Racine	2014	Amherst (2)	Chris Garner
2015	Virginia (2)	Brian Boland	2015	Barry (3)	George Samuel	2015	Claremont-Mudd-Scripps (2)	Paul Settles
2016	Virginia (3)	Brian Boland	2016	Hawaii Pacific	Hendrik Bode	2016	Bowdoin	Conor Smith
2017	Virginia (4)	Brian Boland	2017	West Florida (4)	Derrick Racine	2017	Emory (4)	John Browning
2018	Wake Forest	Tony Bresky	2018	Columbus State	Evan Isaacs	2018	Middlebury (3)	Bob Hansen
2019	Texas	Bruce Berque	2019	Barry (4)	George Samuel	2019	Emory (5)	John Browning
2020	Cancelled due to Covid-19		2020	Cancelled due to Covid-19		2020	Cancelled due to Covid-19	
2021	Florida	Bryan Shelton	2021	Barry (5)	George Samuel	2021	Emory (6)	John Browning
2022	Virginia (5)	Andres Pedroso	2022	Barry (6)	Thomas Hipp	2022	Chicago	Jay Tee
2023	Virginia (6)	Andres Pedroso	2023	Barry (7)	Thomas Hipp	2023	Case Western	Todd Wojtkowski
2024	TCU	David Roditi	2024	Valdosta State (3)	John Hansen	2024	Chicago (2)	Matt Brisotti
2025	Wake Forest (2)	Tony Bresky	2025	Valdosta State (4)	John Hansen	2025	Denison	David Schilling

== Individual champions ==
The NCAA was founded in 1906. The first tennis championship sponsored by the NCAA was in 1946.
Individual championships were not held in 1917–18.

=== Singles ===
Division I			Division II			Division III		
Year	Player	School	Year	Player	School	Year	Player	School
1883	Joseph Clark (spring)	Harvard	not contested			not contested		
1883	Howard Taylor (fall)	Harvard (2)	not contested			not contested		
1884	Percy Knapp	Yale	not contested			not contested		
1885	Percy Knapp (2)	Yale (2)	not contested			not contested		
1886	Godfrey Brinley	Trinity (Conn.)	not contested			not contested		
1887	Philip Sears	Harvard (3)	not contested			not contested		
1888	Philip Sears (2)	Harvard (4)	not contested			not contested		
1889	Robert P. Huntington	Yale (3)	not contested			not contested		
1890	Fred Hovey	Harvard (5)	not contested			not contested		
1891	Fred Hovey (2)	Harvard (6)	not contested			not contested		
1892	William Larned	Cornell	not contested			not contested		
1893	Malcolm Chace	Brown	not contested			not contested		
1894	Malcolm Chace (2)	Yale (4)	not contested			not contested		
1895	Malcolm Chace (3)	Yale (5)	not contested			not contested		
1896	Malcolm Whitman	Harvard (7)	not contested			not contested		
1897	S.G. Thompson	Princeton	not contested			not contested		
1898	Leo Ware	Harvard (8)	not contested			not contested		
1899	Dwight Davis	Harvard (9)	not contested			not contested		
1900	Raymond Little	Princeton (2)	not contested			not contested		
1901	Fred Alexander	Princeton (3)	not contested			not contested		
1902	William Clothier	Harvard (10)	not contested			not contested		
1903	Edward Dewhurst	Penn	not contested			not contested		
1904	Robert LeRoy	Columbia	not contested			not contested		
1905	Edward Dewhurst	Penn (2)	not contested			not contested		
1906	Robert LeRoy (2)	Columbia (2)	not contested			not contested		
1907	G. Peabody Gardner	Harvard (11)	not contested			not contested		
1908	Nathaniel Niles	Harvard (12)	not contested			not contested		
1909	Wallace Johnson	Penn (3)	not contested			not contested		
1910	Reuben A. Holden III	Yale (6)	not contested			not contested		
1911	Edward Whitney	Harvard (13)	not contested			not contested		
1912	George Church	Princeton (4)	not contested			not contested		
1913	Richard Williams	Harvard (14)	not contested			not contested		
1914	George Church (2)	Princeton (5)	not contested			not contested		
1915	Richard Williams (2)	Harvard (15)	not contested			not contested		
1916	G. Colket Caner	Harvard (16)	not contested			not contested		
1917	not contested		not contested			not contested		
1918	not contested		not contested			not contested		
1919	Chuck Garland	Yale (7)	not contested			not contested		
1920	Lascelles Banks	Yale (8)	not contested			not contested		
1921	Philip Neer	Stanford	not contested			not contested		
1922	Lucien Williams	Yale (9)	not contested			not contested		
1923	Carl Fischer	Philadelphia College of Osteopathic Medicine	not contested			not contested		
1924	Wallace Scott	Washington-St. Louis	not contested			not contested		
1925	Edward Chandler	California	not contested			not contested		
1926	Edward Chandler (2)	California (2)	not contested			not contested		
1927	Wilmer Allison	Texas	not contested			not contested		
1928	Julius Seligson	Lehigh	not contested			not contested		
1929	Berkeley Bell	Texas (2)	not contested			not contested		
1930	Clifford Sutter	Tulane	not contested			not contested		
1931	Keith Gledhill	Stanford (2)	not contested			not contested		
1932	Clifford Sutter (2)	Tulane (2)	not contested			not contested		
1933	Jack Tidball	UCLA	not contested			not contested		
1934	Gene Mako	USC	not contested			not contested		
1935	Wilbur Hess	Rice	not contested			not contested		
1936	Ernest Sutter	Tulane (3)	not contested			not contested		
1937	Ernest Sutter (2)	Tulane (4)	not contested			not contested		
1938	Frank Guernsey	Rice (2)	not contested			not contested		
1939	Frank Guernsey (2)	Rice (3)	not contested			not contested		
1940	Donald McNeill	Kenyon	not contested			not contested		
1941	Joseph Hunt	Navy	not contested			not contested		
1942	Ted Schroeder	Stanford (3)	not contested			not contested		
1943	Francisco Segura	Miami (Florida)	not contested			not contested		
1944	Francisco Segura (2)	Miami (Florida) (2)	not contested			not contested		
1945	Francisco Segura (3)	Miami (Florida) (3)	not contested			not contested		
1946 †	Bob Falkenburg	USC (2)	not contested			not contested		
1947	Gardner Larned	William & Mary	not contested			not contested		
1948	Harry Likas	San Francisco	not contested			not contested		
1949	Jack Tuero	Tulane (5)	not contested			not contested		
1950	Herbert Flam	UCLA (2)	not contested			not contested		
1951	Tony Trabert	Cincinnati	not contested			not contested		
1952	Hugh Stewart	USC (3)	not contested			not contested		
1953	Ham Richardson	Tulane (6)	not contested			not contested		
1954	Ham Richardson (2)	Tulane (7)	not contested			not contested		
1955	Jose Aguero	Tulane (8)	not contested			not contested		
1956	Alex Olmedo	USC (4)	not contested			not contested		
1957	Barry MacKay	Michigan	not contested			not contested		
1958	Alex Olmedo (2)	USC (5)	not contested			not contested		
1959	Whitney Reed	San Jose State	not contested			not contested		
1960	Larry Nagler	UCLA (3)	not contested			not contested		
1961	Allen Fox	UCLA (4)	not contested			not contested		
1962	Rafael Osuna	USC (6)	not contested			not contested		
1963	Dennis Ralston	USC (7)	1963	Gil Rodriguez	Cal State LA	not contested		
1964	Dennis Ralston (2)	USC (8)	1964	Gary Johnson	Cal State LA (2)	not contested		
1965	Arthur Ashe	UCLA (5)	1965	Gary Johnson (2)	Cal State LA (3)	not contested		
1966	Charlie Pasarell	UCLA (6)	1966	George Dickinson	Chattanooga	not contested		
1967	Bob Lutz	USC (9)	1967	Sherwood Stewart	Lamar	not contested		
1968	Stan Smith	USC (10)	1968	Bob Delgado	Cal State LA (4)	not contested		
1969	Joaquín Loyo-Mayo	USC (11)	1969	Steve Messmer	Cal State Northridge	not contested		
1970	Jeff Borowiak	UCLA (7)	1970	Earl O'Neill	UC Irvine	not contested		
1971	Jimmy Connors	UCLA (8)	1971	Bob Chappell	UC Irvine (2)	not contested		
1972	Dick Stockton	Trinity (Texas)	1972	Charles Owens	Samford	not contested		
1973	Alex Mayer	Stanford (4)	1973	Bob Chappell (2)	UC Irvine (3)	not contested		
1974	John Whitlinger	Stanford (5)	1974	Andy Rae	San Diego	not contested		
1975	Billy Martin	UCLA (9)	1975	Andy Rae (2)	San Diego (2)	not contested		
1976	Bill Scanlon	Trinity (Texas) (2)	1976	Tim Monroe	UC Davis	1976	John Blomberg	Claremont-Mudd-Scripps
1977	Matt Mitchell	Stanford (6)	1977	Juan Farrow	SIU Edwardsville	1977	A.J. Shaka	Claremont-Mudd-Scripps (2)
1978	John McEnroe	Stanford (7)	1978	Juan Farrow (2)	SIU Edwardsville (2)	1978	Chris Bussert	Kalamazoo
1979	Kevin Curren	Texas (3)	1979	Arjun Fernando	SIU Edwardsville (3)	1979	Mark Tappan	Redlands
1980	Robert Van't Hof	USC (12)	1980	Juan Farrow (3)	SIU Edwardsville (4)	1980	Chris Burns	Kalamazoo (2)
1981	Tim Mayotte	Stanford (8)	1981	Ken Flach	SIU Edwardsville (5)	1981	Donovan Jones	Claremont-Mudd-Scripps (3)
1982	Mike Leach	Michigan (2)	1982	Ken Flach (2)	SIU Edwardsville (6)	1982	Shaun Miller	Gustavus Adolphus
1983	Greg Holmes	Utah	1983	Ken Flach (3)	SIU Edwardsville (7)	1983	Erik Michelsen	Redlands (2)
1984	Mikael Pernfors	Georgia	1984	Steve Riza	Stephen F. Austin	1984	Scott Moore	Redlands (3)
1985	Mikael Pernfors (2)	Georgia (2)	1985	Brian Talgo	Rollins	1985	Toby Clark	Principia
1986	Dan Goldie	Stanford (9)	1986	Neil Smith	Stephen F. Austin (2)	1986	Tim Corwin	Kalamazoo (3)
1987	Andrew Burrow	Miami (Florida) (4)	1987	Pat Emmet	Rollins (2)	1987	Toby Clark (2)	Principia (2)
1988	Robbie Weiss	Pepperdine	1988	Miles Walker	Chapman	1988	Noel Occomy	Brandeis
1989	Donni Leaycraft	LSU	1989	Mark Billone	Bloomsburg	1989	John Morris	Washington & Lee
1990	Steve Bryan	Texas (4)	1990	Luciano D'Andrea	Tennessee-Martin	1990	Larry Gewer	Washington (Maryland)
1991	Jared Palmer	Stanford (10)	1991	Pradeep Raman	Armstrong	1991	Lewis Miller	Kalamazoo (4)
1992	Alex O'Brien	Stanford (11)	1992	Philipp Schertel	Armstrong (2)	1992	Lewis Miller (2)	Kalamazoo (5)
1993	Chris Woodruff	Tennessee	1993	Mark Segesta	UC Davis (2)	1993	Ryan McKee	Claremont-Mudd-Scripps (4)
1994	Mark Merklein	Florida	1994	Roberto Cavalcante	Hampton	1994	Seth Denawetz	Kalamazoo (6)
1995	Sargis Sargsian	Arizona State	not contested			1995	Damian Polla	Washington (Maryland) (2)
1996	Cecil Mamiit	USC (13)	not contested			1996	Mark Ellis	Cal Lutheran
1997	Luke Smith	UNLV	not contested			1997	Damian Polla (2)	Washington (Maryland) (3)
1998	Bob Bryan	Stanford (12)	not contested			1998	David Weisman	Babson
1999	Jeff Morrison	Florida (2)	not contested			1999	Thomas Oechel	UC Santa Cruz
2000	Alex Kim	Stanford (13)	not contested			2000	Kayvon Fatahalian	Carnegie Mellon
2001	Matías Boeker	Georgia (3)	not contested			2001	Derek Fitzpatrick	UC Santa Cruz (2)
2002	Matías Boeker (2)	Georgia (4)	not contested			2002	Josh Lefkowitz	Williams
2003	Amer Delić	Illinois	not contested			2003	Eric Butorac	Gustavus Adolphus
2004	Benjamin Becker	Baylor	not contested			2004	Matt Seeberger	UC Santa Cruz (3)
2005	Benedikt Dorsch	Baylor (2)	not contested			2005	Matt Seeberger (2)	UC Santa Cruz (4)
2006	Benjamin Kohllöffel	UCLA (10)	not contested			2006	Will Boe-Wiegaard	Bates
2007	Somdev Devvarman	Virginia	not contested			2007	Matt Seeberger (3)	UC Santa Cruz (5)
2008	Somdev Devvarman (2)	Virginia (2)	not contested			2008	Michael Greenberg	Kenyon
2009	Devin Britton	Mississippi	not contested			2009	Michael Goodwin	Emory
2010	Bradley Klahn	Stanford (14)	not contested			2010	John Watts	Washington-St. Louis
2011	Steve Johnson	USC (14)	not contested			2011	Chris Goodwin	Emory (2)
2012	Steve Johnson (2)	USC (15)	not contested			2012	Dillon Pottish	Emory (3)
2013	Blaž Rola	Ohio State	not contested			2013	Adam Putterman	Washington-St. Louis (2)
2014	Marcos Giron	UCLA (11)	not contested			2014	Joey Fritz	Amherst
2015	Ryan Shane	Virginia (3)	not contested			2015	Warren Wood	Claremont-Mudd-Scripps (5)
2016	Mackenzie McDonald	UCLA (12)	not contested			2016	Skyler Butts	Claremont-Mudd-Scripps (6)
2017	Thai-Son Kwiatkowski	Virginia (4)	not contested			2017	Lubomir Cuba	Middlebury
2018	Petros Chrysochos	Wake Forest	not contested			2018	Grant Urken	Bowdoin
2019	Paul Jubb	South Carolina	not contested			2019	Jonathan Jemison	Emory (4)
2020	Cancelled due to Covid-19		not contested			2020	Cancelled due to Covid-19	
2021	Sam Riffice	Florida (2)	not contested			2021	Leo Vithoontien	Carleton
2022	Ben Shelton	Florida (3)	not contested			2022	Stan Morris	Middlebury (2)
2023	Ethan Quinn	Georgia (5)	not contested			2023	Rishabh Sharda	Tufts
2024	Filip Planinšek	Alabama	not contested			2024	Tristan Bradley	Bowdoin (2)
2024−25	Michael Zheng	Columbia (3)	not contested			2025	Advik Mareedu	Claremont-Mudd-Scripps (7)
2025	Michael Zheng (2)	Columbia (4)	not contested					

† First championship sponsored by NCAA

=== Doubles ===
Division I			Division II			Division III		
Year	Champions	School	Year	Champions	School	Year	Champions	School
1883	Joseph Clark, Howard Taylor (spring)	Harvard	not contested			not contested		
1883	R.E. Presbrey, Howard Taylor (fall)	Harvard (2)	not contested			not contested		
1884	Wallace Knapp, William Thorne	Yale	not contested			not contested		
1885	Wallace Knapp (2), Arthur Shipman	Yale (2)	not contested			not contested		
1886	Wallace Knapp (2), William Thacher	Yale (3)	not contested			not contested		
1887	P.S. Sears, Quincy Shaw	Harvard (3)	not contested			not contested		
1888	Oliver Campbell, V.G. Hall	Columbia	not contested			not contested		
1889	Oliver Campbell (2), A.E. Wright	Columbia (2)	not contested			not contested		
1890	S.T. Chase, Quincy Shaw (2)	Harvard (4)	not contested			not contested		
1891	Fred Hovey, Robert Wrenn	Harvard (5)	not contested			not contested		
1892	F.B. Winslow, Robert Wrenn (2)	Harvard (6)	not contested			not contested		
1893	Malcolm Chace, C.R. Budlong	Brown	not contested			not contested		
1894	Malcolm Chace (2), Arthur E. Foote	Yale (4)	not contested			not contested		
1895	Malcolm Chace (23), Arthur E. Foote	Yale (5)	not contested			not contested		
1896	W.M. Scudder, Leo Ware	Harvard (7)	not contested			not contested		
1897	Leo Ware, Malcolm Whitman	Harvard (8)	not contested			not contested		
1898	Leo Ware (2), Malcolm Whitman (2)	Harvard (9)	not contested			not contested		
1899	Dwight Davis, Holcombe Ward	Harvard (10)	not contested			not contested		
1900	Fred Alexander, Raymond Little	Princeton	not contested			not contested		
1901	H.A. Plummer, Samuel L. Russell	Yale (6)	not contested			not contested		
1902	William Clothier, E.W. Leonard	Harvard (11)	not contested			not contested		
1903	Fredrick Colston, E. Clapp	Yale (7)	not contested			not contested		
1904	Karl Behr, George Bodman	Yale (8)	not contested			not contested		
1905	E.B. Dewhurst, H.B. Register	Penn	not contested			not contested		
1906	Albert Spaulding, Howard S. Wells	Yale (9)	not contested			not contested		
1907	A.S. Dabney, Nat Niles	Harvard (12)	not contested			not contested		
1908	Alex Thayer, H.M. Tilden	Penn (2)	not contested			not contested		
1909	Wallace Johnson, Alex Thayer (2)	Penn (3)	not contested			not contested		
1910	Burnham Dell, Dean Mathey	Princeton (2)	not contested			not contested		
1911	C.T. Butler, Dean Mathey (2)	Princeton (3)	not contested			not contested		
1912	George Church, W.H. Mace	Princeton (4)	not contested			not contested		
1913	J.J. Armstrong, Watson Washburn	Harvard (13)	not contested			not contested		
1914	Richard Harte, R. Norris Williams	Harvard (14)	not contested			not contested		
1915	Richard Harte (2), R. Norris Williams (2)	Harvard (15)	not contested			not contested		
1916	G. Colket Caner, Richard Harte (3)	Harvard (16)	not contested			not contested		
1919	Charles Garland, K.N. Hawks	Yale (10)	not contested			not contested		
1920	Amos Wilder, Leland Wiley	Yale (11)	not contested			not contested		
1921	Brooks Fenno, William Feibleman	Harvard (17)	not contested			not contested		
1922	James Davies, Philip Neer	Stanford	not contested			not contested		
1923	Louis Thalheimer, Lew White	Texas	not contested			not contested		
1924	Louis Thalheimer (2), Lew White (2)	Texas (2)	not contested			not contested		
1925	Gervais Hills, Gerald Stratford	California	not contested			not contested		
1926	Edward Chandler, Tom Stow	California (2)	not contested			not contested		
1927	Kenneth Appel, John Van Ryn	Princeton (5)	not contested			not contested		
1928	Alan Herrington, Ralph McElvenny	Stanford (2)	not contested			not contested		
1929	Benjamin Gorchakoff, Arthur Kussman	Occidental	not contested			not contested		
1930	Dolf Muehleisen, Robert Muench	California (3)	not contested			not contested		
1931	Bruce Barnes, Karl Kamrath	Texas (3)	not contested			not contested		
1932	Joseph Coughlin, Keith Gledhill	Stanford (3)	not contested			not contested		
1933	Joseph Coughlin (2), Sam Lee	Stanford (4)	not contested			not contested		
1934	Phillip Castlen, Gene Mako	USC	not contested			not contested		
1935	Richard Bennett, Paul Newton	California (4)	not contested			not contested		
1936	Bennett Dey, William Seward	Stanford (5)	not contested			not contested		
1937	Richard Bennett (2), Paul Newton (2)	California (5)	not contested			not contested		
1938	Joseph Hunt, Lewis Wetherell	USC (2)	not contested			not contested		
1939	Douglas Imhoff, Robert Peacock	California (6)	not contested			not contested		
1940	Lawrence Dee, James Wade	Stanford (6)	not contested			not contested		
1941	Charles Mattman, Charles Olewine	USC (3)	not contested			not contested		
1942	Lawrence Dee (2), Ted Schroeder	Stanford (7)	not contested			not contested		
1943	Walter Driver, John Hickman	Texas (4)	not contested			not contested		
1944	John Hickman (2), Felix Kelley	Texas (5)	not contested			not contested		
1945	Thomas Burke, Pancho Segura	Miami (Florida)	not contested			not contested		
1946 †	Robert Falkenburg, Thomas Falkenburg	USC (4)	not contested			not contested		
1947	Bob Curtis, Sam Match	Rice	not contested			not contested		
1948	Bernard Bartzen, Fred Kovaleski	William & Mary	not contested			not contested		
1949	James Brink, Fred Fisher	Washington	not contested			not contested		
1950	Herbert Flam, Gene Garrett	UCLA	not contested			not contested		
1951	Earl Cochell, Hugh Stewart	USC (5)	not contested			not contested		
1952	Hugh Ditzler, Clifton Mayne	California (7)	not contested			not contested		
1953	Lawrence Huebner, Robert Perry	UCLA (2)	not contested			not contested		
1954	Ronald Livingston, Robert Perry (2)	UCLA (3)	not contested			not contested		
1955	Francisco Contreras, Joaquin Reyes	USC (6)	not contested			not contested		
1956	Francisco Contreras (2), Alex Olmedo	USC (7)	not contested			not contested		
1957	Crawford Henry, Ronald Holmberg	Tulane	not contested			not contested		
1958	Edward Atkinson, Alex Olmedo (2)	USC (8)	not contested			not contested		
1959	Crawford Henry (2), Ronald Holmberg (2)	Tulane (2)	not contested			not contested		
1960	Allen Fox, Larry Nagler	UCLA (4)	not contested			not contested		
1961	Ramsey Earnhart, Rafael Osuna	USC (9)	not contested			not contested		
1962	Ramsey Earnhart (2), Rafael Osuna (2)	USC (10)	not contested			not contested		
1963	Rafael Osuna (3), Dennis Ralston	USC (11)	1963	Gil Rodriguez, John Lee	Cal State LA	not contested		
1964	William Bond, Dennis Ralston (2)	USC (12)	1964	Don Gaynor, Lee Reid	UC Santa Barbara	not contested		
1965	Arthur Ashe, Ian Crookenden	UCLA (5)	1965	Bill Schoen, John Yeomans	Redlands	not contested		
1966	Ian Crookenden (2), Charlie Pasarell	UCLA (6)	1966	Ken Stuart, Fred Suessmann	Long Beach State	not contested		
1967	Bob Lutz, Stan Smith	USC (13)	1967	Fred Suessmann (2), Dennis Trout	Long Beach State (2)	not contested		
1968	Bob Lutz (2), Stan Smith (2)	USC (14)	1968	Gary Ogden, Jim Powers	Fresno State	not contested		
1969	Marcelo Lara, Joaquín Loyo-Mayo	USC (15)	1969	George Benedict, Steve Messmer	Cal State Northridge	not contested		
1970	Pat Cramer, Luis Garcia	Miami (Florida) (2)	1970	Gregg Jablonski, Charles Nachand	UC Irvine	not contested		
1971	Jeff Borowiak, Haroon Rahim	UCLA (7)	1971	Ron Lague, John Lowman	Rollins	not contested		
1972	Alex Mayer, Roscoe Tanner	Stanford (8)	1972	John Lowman (2), Mike Strickland	Rollins (2)	not contested		
1973	Jim Delaney, Alex Mayer (2)	Stanford (9)	1973	Bob Chappell, Glenn Cripe	UC Irvine (2)	not contested		
1974	Jim Delaney (2), John Whitlinger	Stanford (10)	1974	Andy Rae, Russell Watts	San Diego	not contested		
1975	Bruce Manson, Butch Walts	USC (16)	1975	Scott Carnahan, Bob Wright	UC Irvine (3)	not contested		
1976	Peter Fleming, Ferdi Taygan	UCLA (8)	1976	Roger de Santis Guedes, Bruce Foxworth	Hampton	1976	Larry Davidson, John Irwin	Swarthmore
1977	Chris Lewis, Bruce Manson (2)	USC (17)	1977	Curt Stalder, Jeff Williams	UC Irvine (4)	1977	Stewart Jackson, Ben Johns	Washington & Lee
1978	John Austin, Bruce Nichols	UCLA (9)	1978	Rick Goldberg, Par Svensson	San Diego (2)	1978	Chris Bussert, Jim Hosner	Kalamazoo
1979	Erick Iskersky, Ben McKown	Trinity (Texas)	1979	Juan Farrow, Arjun Fernando	SIU Edwardsville	1979	Mike Capelouto, Ken Whitmer	Redlands
1980	Rodney Harmon, Mel Purcell	Tennessee	1980	Juan Farrow (2), Hugo Núñez	SIU Edwardsville (2)	1980	Paul Holbach, John Mattke	Gustavus Adolphus
1981	David Pate, Karl Richter	TCU	1981	Bart Bernstein, Brian Lusson	Texas State	1981	Jim Hearn, Shaun Miller	Gustavus Adolphus (2)
1982	Peter Doohan, Pat Serret	Arkansas	1982	Doug Burke, Ken Flach	SIU Edwardsville (3)	1982	Shaun Miller (2), Rich Skanse	Gustavus Adolphus (3)
1983	Ola Malmqvist, Allen Miller	Georgia	1983	Ken Flach (2), Robert Seguso	SIU Edwardsville (4)	1983	Alex Gaeta, Bob Swartout	Rochester
1984	Jerome Jones, Kelly Jones	Pepperdine	1984	Dave Delseni, Johan Sjogren	SIU Edwardsville (5)	1984	Dan Beers, Eugene Jones	UC San Diego
1985	Carlos DiLaura, Kelly Jones (2)	Pepperdine (2)	1985	Tom Goleš, Chris Langford	Stephen F. Austin	1985	Shep Davidson, Jeff Krieger	Swarthmore (2)
1986	Rick Leach, Tim Pawsat	USC (18)	1986	Paul Landry, Bob Zoller	Cal Poly	1986	Jim Burda, Alex Palladino	Kalamazoo (2)
1987	Rick Leach (2), Scott Melville	USC (19)	1987	Paul Wekesa, Barry Hancock	Chapman	1987	Jim Burda (2), Alex Palladino (2)	Kalamazoo (3)
1988	Patrick Galbraith, Brian Garrow	UCLA (10)	1988	Robert Green, Barry Pelts	Rollins (3)	1988	Lance Au, Frank Hinman	Claremont-Mudd-Scripps
1989	Eric Amend, Byron Black	USC (20)	1989	Kurt Hammerschmidt, Aga Soemarno	Ferris State	1989	Robert Matthews, John Morris	Washington & Lee (2)
1990	Doug Eisenman, Matt Lucena	California (8)	1990	Luciano D'Andrea, Vesa Ponkka	Tennessee-Martin	1990	Robert Matthews (2), John Morris (2)	Washington & Lee (3)
1991	Matt Lucena (2), Bent-Ove Pedersen	California (9)	1991	Dave Allen, Mark Segesta	UC Davis	1991	Dave Jussila, Ryan Skanse	Gustavus Adolphus (4)
1992	Chris Cocotos, Alex O'Brien	Stanford (11)	1992	Jeff McCann, Steve Summer	UC Davis (2)	1992	Ryan McKee, Chris Noyes	Claremont-Mudd-Scripps (2)
1993	David Blair, Mark Merklein	Florida	1993	Steve Kobold, Oscar Mancisidor	Cal Poly Pomona	1993	Tim Cooley, Ryan McKee (2)	Claremont-Mudd-Scripps (3)
1994	Laurent Miquelard, Joc Simmons	Mississippi State	1994	Lee Holyoak, Brett Simpson	Lander	1994	Jonathan Harper, Ron Ward	UC Santa Cruz
1995	Mahesh Bhupathi, Ali Hamadeh	Mississippi	not contested			1995	Todd Born, John Weston	Redlands (2)
1996	Justin Gimelstob, Srdjan Muskatirovic	UCLA (11)	not contested			1996	Jonathan Harper (2), Josh Vining	UC Santa Cruz (2)
1997	Luke Smith, Tim Blenkiron	UNLV	not contested			1997	Mark Ellis, Jenia Karimov	Cal Lutheran
1998	Bob Bryan, Mike Bryan	Stanford (12)	not contested			1998	Brian Cummings, Thomas Oechel	UC Santa Cruz (3)
1999	K.J. Hippensteel, Ryan Wolters	Stanford (13)	not contested			1999	Brian Cummings (2), Thomas Oechel (2)	UC Santa Cruz (4)
2000	Cary Franklin, Graydon Oliver	Illinois	not contested			2000	Peter Gladkin, Thomas Oechel (3)	UC Santa Cruz (5)
2001	Matías Boeker, Travis Parrott	Georgia (2)	not contested			2001	Nick Cunningham, Derek Fitzpatrick	UC Santa Cruz (6)
2002	Andrew Colombo, Mark Kovacs	Auburn	not contested			2002	John Michael Cham-A-Koon, Ivan Yeh	Claremont-Mudd-Scripps (4)
2003	Rajeev Ram, Brian Wilson	Illinois (2)	not contested			2003	Eric Butorac, Kevin Whipple	Gustavus Adolphus (5)
2004	Sam Warburg, KC Corkery	Stanford (14)	not contested			2004	Paul Bristow, Dan Uyar	Mary Washington
2005	John Isner, Antonio Ruiz	Georgia (3)	not contested			2005	Matt Brunner, Matt Seeberger	UC Santa Cruz (7)
2006	Kevin Anderson, Ryan Rowe	Illinois (3)	not contested			2006	Matt Seeberger (2), Shane Templeman	UC Santa Cruz (8)
2007	Marco Born, Andreas Siljeström	Middle Tennessee State	not contested			2007	Max Ortiz, Matt Seeberger (3)	UC Santa Cruz (9)
2008	Robert Farah, Kaes Van't Hof	USC (21)	not contested			2008	Guillaume Schils, Larry Wang	Claremont-Mudd-Scripps (5)
2009	Dominic Inglot, Michael Shabaz	Virginia	not contested			2009	Amrit Ruspasinghe, Ben Stein	Bates
2010	Drew Courtney, Michael Shabaz (2)	Virginia (2)	not contested			2010	Brian Pybas, Marc Vartabedian	UC Santa Cruz (10)
2011	Jeff Dadamo, Austin Krajicek	Texas A&M	not contested			2011	Oscar Pena, Stephen Sullivan	Bowdoin
2012	Chase Buchanan, Blaž Rola	Ohio State	not contested			2012	Austin Chafetz, Luis Rattenhuber	Amherst
2013	Jarmere Jenkins, Mac Styslinger	Virginia (3)	not contested			2013	Elliot Kahler, Ian Wagner	Emory
2014	Miķelis Lībietis, Hunter Reese	Tennessee (2)	not contested			2014	Eric Klawitter, Chris Krimbill	Case Western
2015	Lloyd Glasspool, Søren Hess-Olesen	Texas	not contested			2015	Joe Dorn, Warren Wood	Claremont-Mudd-Scripps
2016	Mackenzie McDonald, Martin Redlicki	UCLA (12)	not contested			2016	Samuel Geier, Tristan Kaye	Kenyon
2017	Andrew Harris, Spencer Papa	Oklahoma	not contested			2017	Lubomir Cuba, William De Quant	Middlebury
2018	Martin Redlicki (2), Evan Zhu	UCLA (13)	not contested			2018	Lubomir Cuba (2), Kyle Schlanger	Middlebury (2)
2019	Maxime Cressy, Keegan Smith	UCLA (14)	not contested			2019	Yangeng Jiang, Grant Urken	Bowdoin (2)
2020	not contested		not contested			2020	not contested	
2021	Patrick Harper, Adam Walton	Tennessee (3)	not contested			2021	Leo Vithoontien, Xander Zuczek	Carleton
2022	Cleeve Harper, Richard Ciamarra	Texas (2)	not contested			2022	James Hopper, Jonathan Powell	Case Western (2)
2023	Andrew Lutschaunig, James Trotter	Ohio State (2)	not contested			2023	Vishwa Aduru, James Hopper (2)	Case Western (3)
2024	Robert Cash, JJ Tracy	Ohio State (3)	not contested			2024	Gage Gohl, Tyler Haddorff	Gustavus Adolphus (6)
2024−25	Pedro Vives, Lui Maxted	TCU (2)	not contested			2025	Andrei Leonov, Pat Otero	UChicago
2025	Mans Dahlberg, Dylan Dietrich	Virginia (4)	not contested					

† First championship sponsored by NCAA

== Records ==
The following is a list of NCAA Division I college tennis individual statistics and records through the 2025 NCAA Division I Tennis Championships.

=== Individual national championships – Singles ===
School(s)	Championships
Harvard	16
USC	15
Stanford	14
UCLA	12
Yale	9
Tulane	8
Georgia, Princeton	5
Columbia, Miami (FL), Texas, Virginia	4
Florida, Penn, Rice	3
Baylor, California, Michigan, Trinity (TX)	2
Alabama, Arizona State, Brown, Cincinnati, Cornell, Illinois, Kenyon, Lehigh, LSU, Navy, Ohio State, Ole Miss, Pepperdine, Philadelphia Osteopathic, San Francisco, San Jose State, South Carolina, Tennessee, Trinity (CT), UNLV, Utah, Wake Forest, Washington, William & Mary	1

=== Individual national championships – Doubles ===
School(s)	Championships
USC	21
Harvard	17
Stanford	14
UCLA	13
Yale	11
California	9
Texas	7
Princeton	5
Virginia	4
Georgia, Illinois, Ohio State, Penn, Tennessee	3
Columbia, Miami (FL), Pepperdine, TCU, Tulane	2
Arkansas, Auburn, Brown, Florida, Middle Tennessee, Mississippi State, Occidental, Oklahoma, Ole Miss, Rice, Texas A&M, Trinity (TX), UNLV, Washington, William & Mary	1

=== Individual records ===
- Note: No doubles team has won more than two titles; however, the following players have won three doubles titles with two or more different partners: Wallace P. Knapp, Yale (1884-85-86); Malcolm Chace, Brown (1893) and Yale (1894–95); Leo Ware, Harvard (1896-97-98); Richard Harte, Harvard (1914-15-16); and Rafael Osuna, Southern California (1961-62-63)
- Most individual titles, career: 6
  - Malcolm Chace, Brown/Yale
    - Singles (1893, 1894, and 1895), Doubles (1893, 1894, and 1895)
- Most singles titles, career: 3
  - Malcolm Chace, Brown/Yale (1893, 1894, and 1895)
  - Francisco Segura, Miami (FL) (1943, 1944, and 1945)
