= Dick Gould =

American tennis player & coach (born 1937)

- Born: October 1, 1937 (age 88); Ventura, California
- Citizenship: United States
- Education: Stanford University
- Occupation: Men's tennis coach
- Years active: 1961–2004
- Employer: Stanford University
- Known for: Coached Stanford men's tennis team to 17 NCAA team championships

Dick Gould (born October 1, 1937) is an American tennis coach. He was the Men's Tennis Coach at Stanford University for 38 years from 1966 to 2004. The Stanford men's tennis teams won 17 NCAA Men's Tennis Championships, and 50 of his players won All-American honors under Gould's tenure. He was named the ITA-Wilson "Coach of the Decade" both for the 1980s and the 1990s.

== Biography ==
=== Early years ===
Gould was born in Ventura, California in 1937. He attended Ventura High School with longtime tennis friend, Tom Chivington. Gould was the Student Body President and the Most Valuable Player (MVP) of the Tennis Team. He also won the Ventura County Singles and Doubles Championships in 1955.

After graduating from Ventura High School in 1955, Gould enrolled at Stanford University. During the summer of 1958, he contacted the Southern California Tennis Association to provide two players to run a kid's clinic in Ventura and was sent Mike Franks and Noel Brown. Gould won three varsity letters in tennis and won the tennis team's Leadership Award. He graduated from Stanford with a bachelor's degree in 1959 and earned a master's degree from Stanford the following year.

Gould began his coaching career at Mountain View High School in Mountain View, California, where he was Tennis Coach and Assistant Football Coach from 1960 to 1964. From 1963 to 1966, Gould was the Tennis Coach at Foothill Junior College in Los Altos, California, where his first champion player was Horst Ritter, who won the State Junior College Singles Championship, as well as the doubles with Rodney Kopp in 1963. His teams won consecutive State Junior College Championships in 1964 and 1965. Gould was succeeded by friend and another legendary coach in Tom Chivington. Gould was also the tennis professional at the Fremont Hills Country Club in Los Altos Hills from 1960 to 1966.

=== Stanford's men's tennis coach ===
In 1966, Gould was hired as the Head Tennis Coach at Stanford. He continued to serve as Stanford's Head Tennis Coach for 38 years from 1966 to 2004. At Stanford, Gould's tennis teams won 17 NCAA Team Championships in a span of 28 years, winning in 1973 and 1974, 1977 and 1978, 1980 and 1981, 1983, 1986, 1988 through 1990, 1992, 1995 through 1998, and 2000. His teams were NCAA Championship runners-up in 1972, 1976, 1984, and 1994. Gould's players also won 10 singles titles and seven doubles titles. He is the winningest coach in Stanford men's tennis history with an overall record of 776–148 and a .840 winning percentage.

During Gould's tenure as Head Coach at Stanford, 50 players were selected as All-Americans. Nine of his Stanford players, including John McEnroe, Gene Mayer, Alex "Sandy" Mayer, Roscoe Tanner and Tim Mayotte, have gone on to be ranked among the top 15 in ATP World Singles Rankings. Gould has also coached 14 players who have reached top 10 in ATP World Doubles Rankings, including No. 1 Ranked Doubles Players, McEnroe, Jim Grabb, Jonathan Stark, Alex O'Brien, Jared Palmer, and Bob and Mike Bryan.

The Stanford men's tennis program began its rise to national prominence when Gould successfully recruited Roscoe Tanner in 1969 and Alex "Sandy" Mayer in 1970. In 1972, Tanner and Mayer won the NCAA doubles championship, and the Stanford team finished second in the NCAA tournament. The following year, Stanford won everything in the NCAA tournament: Mayer won singles, Mayer and Jim Delaney won doubles, and the team won the national championship ahead of USC. This was Stanford's first NCAA team championship in tennis, and its first NCAA team championship in any sport since 1953.

Gould coached both John McEnroe and his younger brother Patrick. They each led Stanford to NCAA championships, and John won the NCAA single's title.

In June, 1977, a few months before John McEnroe entered Stanford, he reached the Wimbledon semifinals, and there were rumors that he would turn pro immediately. This gave Gould an opportunity to play a trick on McEnroe. In Gould's words:

When school was getting ready to start, he called me. “Coach, I'm at the airport. Can you pick me up as soon as possible?” I teased, “I gave your scholarship away. I thought you were turning pro.” Silence. Then we both cracked up over the phone.

When the tennis season began early in 1978, the Stanford team was so deep that the defending NCAA singles champion, Matt Mitchell, played for Stanford in the no. 4 position behind McEnroe, Bill Maze, and Perry Wright. The team compiled a perfect 24–0 record, the first of three Stanford men's tennis teams to enjoy an undefeated season.

The 1998 team finished its season with a perfect 28–0 record, lost only two singles matches and one doubles point during the entire season, and won all four of its NCAA matches without losing a dual-match point.

Gould's tennis philosophy focused on the serve-and-volley game. However, he continued to have success in the 1990s, even as the game evolved with powerful, oversized, composite rackets and blasting topspin ground strokes.

Gould is also the author of the tennis instructional book, "Tennis Anyone?", one of the most popular tennis guides ever published. In 2022, he published "Anatomy of a Champion: Building and Sustaining Success in Sport, Business, and Life," a book of reflections shared by 166 CEOs, entrepreneurs, coaches, and world champions.

Gould is also credited with developing the first personal seat license plan while coaching at Stanford. Seeking financing for a new tennis stadium, he came up with the idea of selling the rights to seats in 1986, a licensing plan under which purchaser's name is engraved in the seat, and the purchaser owns the right to have first choice for tickets for any event held in the stadium.

=== Family and later years ===
Gould's wife, Anne, was the Women's Tennis Coach at Stanford from 1976 through 1979. She led the women's team to an AIAW championship in 1978—the first team championship in any women's sport for Stanford. The team finished in second place the other three years she coached. (The NCAA did not begin sponsoring women's tennis championships until 1982.)

Gould and his wife have five children.

After the 2004 season, Gould stepped down as the head tennis coach, but remained active at Stanford for many more years as the John L. Hinds Director of Tennis. He retired in January 2018, completing a Stanford tennis career as player, coach, and director of tennis that had spanned 57 years.

=== Awards, honors and halls of fame ===
Gould was twice named the Intercollegiate Tennis Association-Wilson "Coach of the Decade," first for the 1980s and subsequently for the 1990s. He has also been named to multiple halls of fame, including the Pac-12 Conference Hall of Honor in 2019, the USPTA Hall of Fame in 2019, the Intercollegiate Tennis Hall of Fame in 2006, the Stanford University Athletic Hall of Fame in 1994, the Bay Area Sports Hall of Fame in 2006, the San Jose Sports Authority Hall of Fame in 2008, the Ventura County Athletic Hall of Fame in 1990, and the Northern California Tennis Hall of Fame in 1992. The International Tennis Hall of Fame awarded its Tennis Educational Merit Award to Gould in 1982.
