= J. D. Morgan =

American tennis player, coach, and athletic director

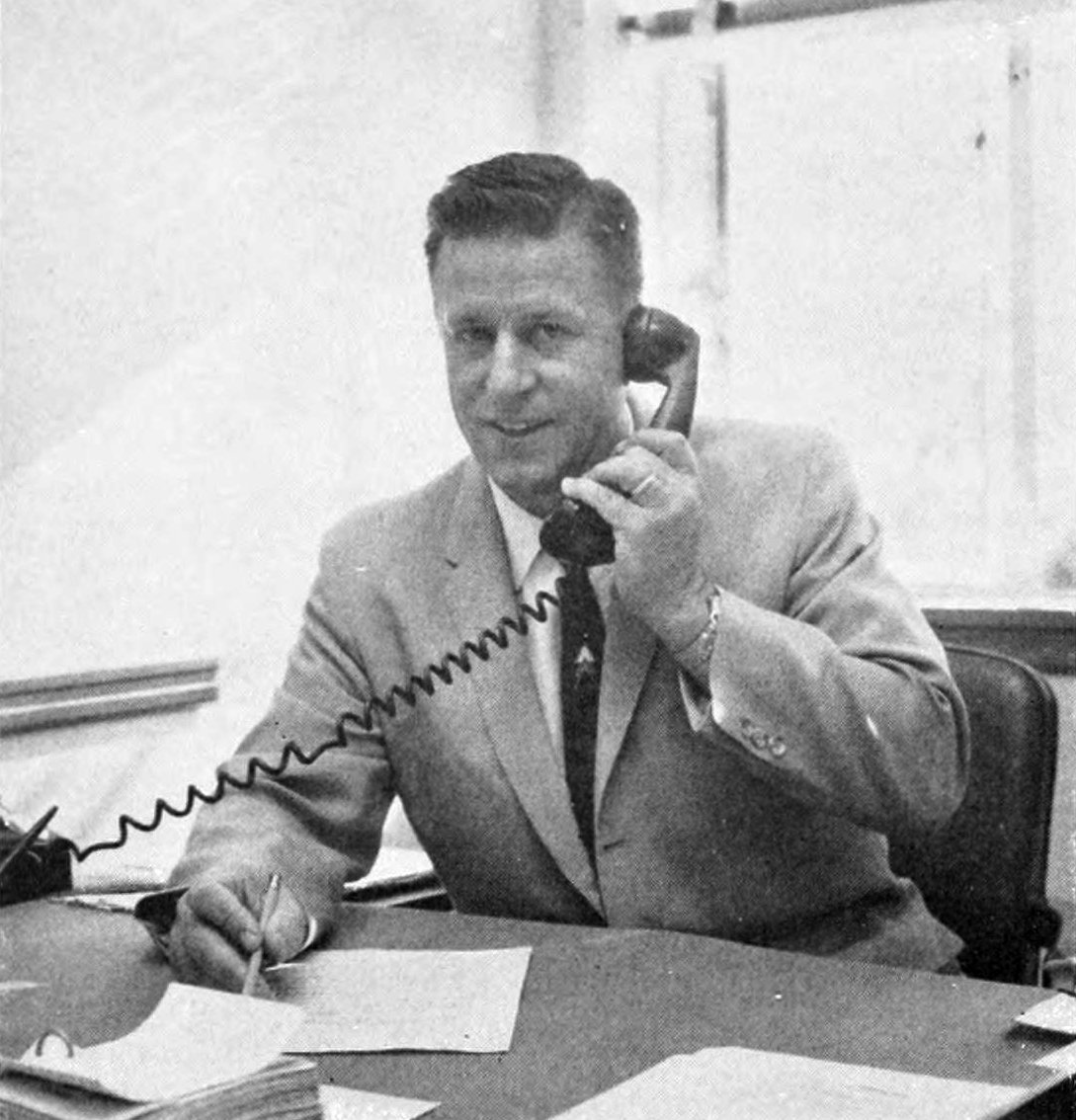
- J. D. Morgan of UCLA
- Born: March 3, 1919; Newcastle, Oklahoma, U.S.
- Died: December 16, 1980 (aged 61); Los Angeles, California, U.S.
- Education: UCLA
- Occupations: Men's tennis coach and athletic director
- Employer: UCLA
- Known for: Eight NCAA Men's Tennis Championships as tennis coach 30 NCAA championships as athletic director

J. D. Morgan (March 3, 1919 – December 16, 1980) was an American tennis player, coach and athletic director. He was associated with athletics at UCLA for more than 40 years. He played four years of varsity tennis at UCLA from 1938-1941 and served as the school's head tennis coach from 1949-1966, leading the Bruins to eight NCAA Men's Tennis Championships. He also served as UCLA's athletic director from 1963-1979, a period during which the university won 30 NCAA championships, including ten NCAA Men's Basketball Championships.

== Biography ==
Morgan was born in Newcastle, Oklahoma, and played football, basketball, tennis and baseball at Cordell High School in Cordell, Oklahoma. Morgan began his lifelong association with UCLA as a student in the late 1930s. He was a four-year letterman on UCLA's tennis team, and was team captain in 1941. During World War II, Morgan served in the U.S. Navy and was the commander of a torpedo boat in the Pacific Theatre of Operations.

In 1946, Morgan returned to UCLA as assistant tennis coach under William C. Ackerman. He took over as the head tennis coach in 1949, a position he held until 1966. UCLA won eight NCAA team championships while Morgan was the men's tennis coach—1950, 1952, 1953, 1954, 1956, 1960, 1961, and 1965. Morgan's championship teams at UCLA included individual champions, including Edith Sigourney, Arthur Ashe, and Charles Pasarell, and outstanding players such as Mike Franks, Mike Green, Allen Fox, and Larry Nagler. He was named to the ITA Collegiate Tennis Hall of Fame in 1983.

In 1963, Morgan was given the additional responsibility as UCLA's athletic director. He stepped down as tennis coach in 1966, but continued to serve as UCLA's athletic director until 1979. During Morgan's 16 years as UCLA's athletic director, he is credited with "revitaliz[ing] the sports program, catapult[ing] Bruin teams into the national spotlight, and ultimately redefin[ing] UCLA athletics as a model looked to by universities across the country." During his tenure as athletic director, UCLA won 30 NCAA championships—ten in basketball, seven in volleyball, six in tennis, four in track and field, and three in water polo. Morgan hired Tommy Prothro as football coach, and the Bruins football teams went to four bowl games, including two Rose Bowls, during Morgan's tenure as athletic director. Morgan also oversaw the completion of Pauley Pavilion and the construction of Drake Stadium, Spaulding Field and a boathouse for crew in Marina del Rey.

Morgan was known for his competitive nature and a personality that some described as "difficult, even arrogant." In his early years as UCLA's athletic director, he sat on the bench with John Wooden during basketball games and was known to vilify officials from the bench. Morgan's outbursts reportedly resulted in a rule change banning athletic directors from sitting on the bench during basketball games (during the 1973 National Invitation Tournament, Alabama athletic director Bear Bryant, also the school's legendary football coach, violated this rule, but the officials did not penalize the Crimson Tide).

In 1979, Morgan retired due to poor health. He died the following year at age 61. In 1983, the J. D. Morgan Center at UCLA was dedicated. It houses the university's athletic department, including both administrative and coaching staff.
