= Brian Boland (tennis) =

American tennis coach

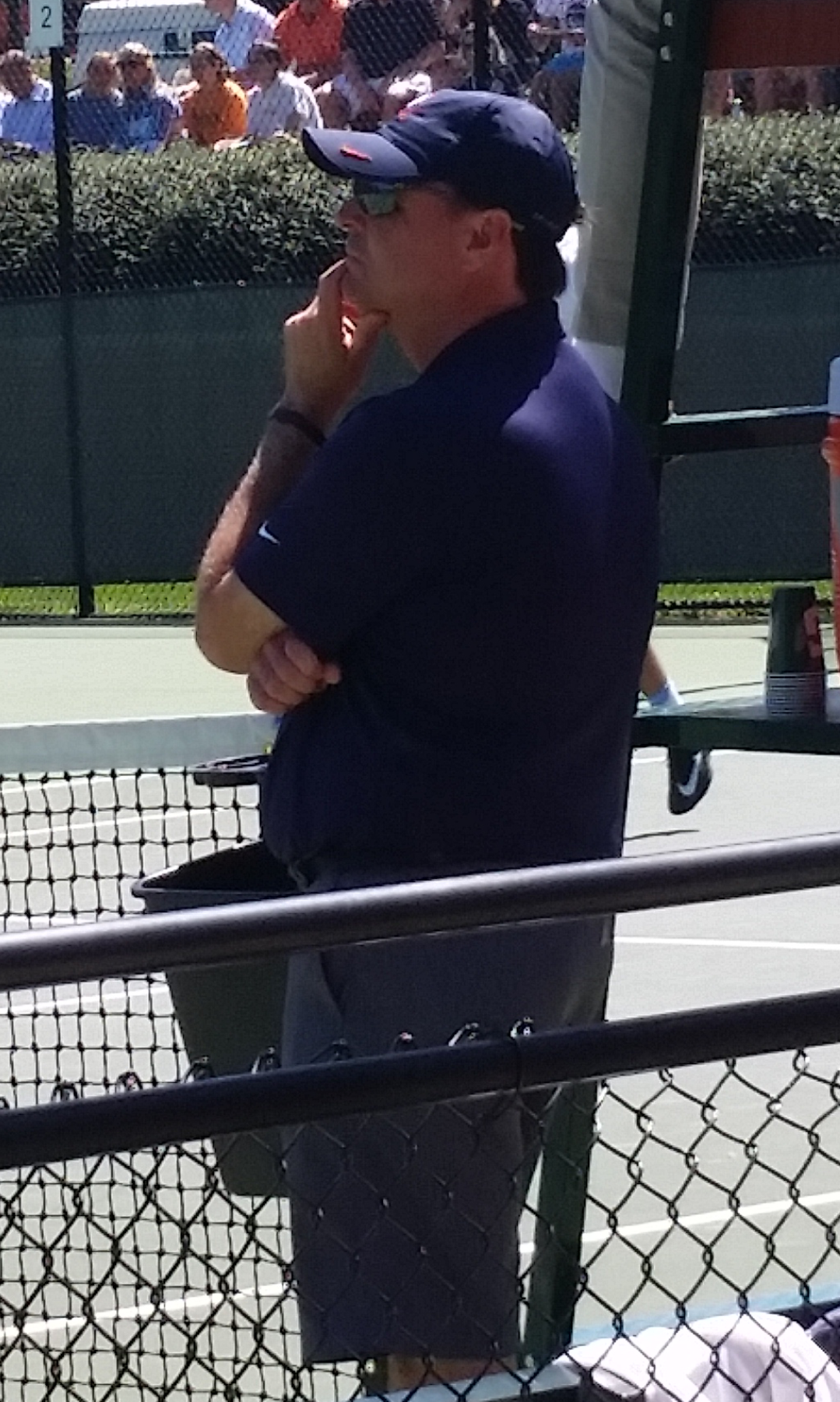
- Brian Boland while at the University of Virginia

Biographical details
- Born: May 27, 1972 (age 54); Robbinsdale, Minnesota, U.S.
- Education: Indiana State University

Coaching career (HC unless noted)
- 1997–2001: Indiana State
- 2002–2017: Virginia
- 2018–2020: Baylor (HC/dir. of tennis)

Head coaching record
- Overall: 574–90 (.859)

Accomplishments and honors

Championships
- NCAA (2013, 2015, 2016, 2017); ITA National Team Indoor (2008, 2009, 2010, 2011, 2013, 2017); Big 12 Conference Tournament (2019); Atlantic Coast Conference (2004, 2005, 2006, 2007, 2008, 2009, 2010, 2011, 2012, 2013, 2014, 2015, 2016); Atlantic Coast Conference Tournament (2004, 2005, 2007, 2008, 2009, 2010, 2011, 2012, 2013, 2014, 2015, 2017); Missouri Valley Conference (1999, 2000, 2001); Missouri Valley Conference Tournament (1999, 2000, 2001)

Awards
- ITA National Coach of the Year (2008, 2016); ACC Coach of the Year (2005, 2008, 2009, 2010, 2011, 2012); MVC Coach of the Year (1997, 1999, 2000, 2001)

Records
- Longest ACC winning streak (140)

Brian P. Boland (born May 27, 1972) is an American tennis coach and founder of Boland College Tennis Placement, a consulting service dedicated to guiding student-athletes through the college tennis recruiting process. He is the head coach of the Hampden–Sydney Tigers tennis team at Hampden–Sydney College. He was the director of tennis and head men's tennis coach at Baylor University from 2018 to 2020 and head coach of the University of Virginia men's tennis team from 2001 until 2017, after holding the same position for five years at his alma mater, Indiana State University. He led the Cavaliers to four NCAA Division I Men's Tennis Championship, in 2013, 2015, 2016, and 2017. Boland's Virginia team held a 140-match winning streak against ACC opponents from April 2006 to February 2016, the longest winning streak in any sport in ACC history. After leaving the Cavaliers tennis program, Boland was the Head of Men's Tennis for USTA Player Development.

== Early years ==
Boland was born in Robbinsdale, Minnesota, the second-youngest of four children. His mother, Donna, was an elementary school teacher, and his father, Bernard, was a lawyer who later became a judge in Minnesota. Boland grew up in St. Cloud, Minnesota, and attended Technical Senior High School. There, he played hockey, soccer, and tennis. Boland attended the University of St. Thomas before transferring to Indiana State University.

== Professional career ==
=== Indiana State University ===
Boland began his coaching career at age 24, taking charge of the Indiana State team in 1996. He led the Sycamores to their first MVC championship and their first berth in the NCAA tournament. While at Indiana State, Boland was also the Director of Tennis at a local country club. He was named the MVC Coach of the Year for the 1996–97, 1998–99, 1999–2000 and 2000–01 seasons. He led the Sycamores to three Conference titles and two NCAA Tournament berths, and coached 11 All-Conference players. Boland was inducted into the Indiana State Athletics Hall of Fame on September 29, 2016.

=== University of Virginia ===
On August 1, 2001, Boland was named head coach of the University of Virginia men's tennis team. He turned the program into a national tennis powerhouse. Virginia won the program's first ever ACC Championship in 2004 under Boland. He led the team to 11 more ACC titles and a historic conference winning streak. In 2013, he helped Virginia cap off its 30–0 season by leading the team to its first NCAA Men's Tennis Championship. Boland was named the 2013 National Coach of the Year by the United States Olympic Committee. On May 19, 2015, he once again led Virginia to an NCAA Championship, the second in three years, as the Cavaliers defeated Oklahoma 4–1 in the finals.

Despite having their historic ACC winning streak snapped during the 2016 season, Boland's team still secured its 13th consecutive ACC regular season title. On May 24, 2016, the team won the NCAA Title for the second consecutive year, and the program's third in four years. Boland finished his tenure as the Cavaliers' head coach by leading the team to its third straight NCAA Championship, defeating North Carolina in the championship match.

During his time at Virginia, Boland coached numerous players who went on to have professional careers, including Somdev Devvarman, Dominic Inglot, Treat Huey, and Jarmere Jenkins. In addition to his USOC National Coach of the Year Award, Boland also received numerous accolades during his coaching career. He has been named ACC, MVC, ITA Regional coach of the year multiple times and was recognized as the 2008 and 2016 ITA National Coach of the Year.

=== United States Tennis Association ===
On March 29, 2017, Boland was announced as the next USTA Player Development Head of Men's Tennis, replacing Jay Berger. His term officially began following the conclusion of the 2017 college tennis season.

=== Baylor University ===
On May 24, 2018, Boland was hired as the director of tennis and head men's tennis coach at Baylor. On July 29, 2020, Boland announced his resignation after allegations that he sent inappropriate messages to a student who had hoped to join Baylor's women's team. On September 10, 2024, U.S. District Judge Alan Albright ordered that all counts and claims against Boland be dismissed without prejudice.

=== Boland College Tennis Placement ===
In 2024, Boland founded Boland College Tennis Placement, a service dedicated to guiding student-athletes through the college tennis recruiting process. The program offers personalized mentoring to help players secure college roster spots and scholarships.

=== Hampden-Sydney College ===
On July 29, 2026, Boland was named head tennis coach at Hampden-Sydney College.

== Personal life ==
Boland is married to his wife, Becky. They have four children, Briana, Bryce, Brendan and Brooke. Boland graduated from Indiana State University in 1995 with a Bachelor of Science degree in political science.
