= Los Angeles Metropolitan Championships =

Defunct tennis tournament
- Tour: USNLTA Circuit (1913–1924); ILTF World Circuit (1925–69, 70–72); ILTF Independent Tour (1970–72) men
- Founded: 1915; 110 years ago
- Abolished: 1973; 52 years ago
- Location: Griffith Park, Los Angeles, United States
- Venue: Griffith Riverside Tennis Facility
- Surface: Hard outdoors

The Los Angeles Metropolitan Championships also known as the Los Angeles Municipal Tournament or Los Angeles Metropolitan Tournament was an international men's and women's hard court tennis tournament founded in 1913 as the Los Angeles City Championships. It was first played at the public Griffith Riverside Tennis Facility at Griffith Park, Los Angeles, United States. This international tournament was part of the ILTF World Circuit until 1973 when it was discontinued from that tour.

The event however still exists today as Los Angeles Metro Tennis Championships.

== History ==
In 1913 the Los Angeles City Championships were first established. In 1933 the tournament was renamed as the Los Angeles Metropolitan Championships. The tournament was organized by the Los Angeles Department of Recreation and Parks and the Southern California Tennis Association and was played on outdoor public hard courts at the Griffith Riverside Tennis Facility, Griffith Park, Los Angeles, United States. The combined tournament was played until 1973 as part of the ILTF World Circuit from 1925. In 1970 the men's event became part of ILTF Independent Tour, the women's event joined the same tour in 1974 following the creation of the WTA Tour. The women's event was held for one season on the ILTF tour before it too was discontinued. Today the tournament is still operating as a local event with multiple age group divisions.

== Finals ==
=== Men's singles ===
(incomplete roll)

Los Angeles City Championships
Year	Winners	Runners-up	Score
↓ ILTF World Circuit ↓
1922	(United States) Elmer Griffin	(United States) Harvey Burton Snodgrass	4–6, 6–3, 6–4, 6–1.
1932	(United States) Lester Stoefen	(United States) Ellsworth Vines	6–4, 5–7, 6–2, 6–4.
Los Angeles Metropolitan Championships
1933	(United States) Frank Westsmith	(United States) Gene Mako	6–8, 6–3, 6–2, 6–3.
1934	(United States) Elbert Lewis	(United States) Phil Castlen	6–3, 4–6, 7–5.
1935	(United States) Gene Mako	(United States) Elbert Lewis	6–3, 2–6, 6–3.
1936	(United States) Bobby Riggs	(United States) Orville Scholtz	6–0, 7–5, 7–5.
1937	(United States) Bobby Riggs (2)	(United States) Jack Kramer	6–2, 7–5, 6–4.
1938	(United States) Jack Kramer	(United States) Myron McNamara	6–2, 7–5, 6–4.
1939	(United States) Jack Kramer (2)	(United States) Bobby Riggs	6–4, 8–6.
1947	(United States) Herb Flam	(United States) Nolan McQuown	6–1, 4–6, 6–3.
1949	(United States) Pancho Gonzales	(United States) Seymour Greenberg	6–1, 8–6.
1951	(United States) Hugh Stewart	(United States) Earl Cochell	6–2, 3–6, 6–4.
1954	(United States) William C. Crosby	(United States) Clyde Hippenstiel	6–4, 6–4, 6–4.
1956	(United States) Clyde Hippenstiel	(United States) Fred Hagist	6–2, 6–2, 6–3.
1957	(United States) Noel Brown	(United States) Glenn Bassett	4–6, 7–5, 6–2 6–2.
1958	(United States) Noel Brown (2)	(United States) Glenn Bassett	10-8, 6–4, 6–0.
1960	(United States) Glenn Bassett	(United States) Robert (Bob) Sherman	4–6, 4–6, 6–4, 8–6, 6–1.
1961	(United States) Dale Rohland	(Socialist Federal Republic of Yugoslavia) Vladimir Petrović	6–4, 6–4, 2–1 ret.
1962	(United States) Dale Rohland (2)	(United States) Lawrence (Larry) Greene	6–2, 6–1.
1963	(United States) Gil Rodriguez	(United States) Dale Rohland	7–5, 6–3.
1964	(United States) Bert Brown	(United States) Ed Grubb	6–4, 6–4.
1965	(Australia) Roy Emerson	(Mexico) Rafael Osuna	6–3, 6–2.
1966	(United States) Ed Grubb	(United States) Gary Johnson	6–2, 6–2.
1967	(United States) Ed Grubb (2)	(United States) Robert (Bob) Greene	6–1, 6–0.
1968	(United States) Ed Grubb (3)	(United States) Gary Johnson	?
↓ Open era ↓
1969	(United States) Jeff Austin	(United States) Ed Grubb	6–3, 1–6, 6–3.
↓ ITF Independent Tour ↓
1970	(United States) Samuel Match	(United States) Jerry Van Linge	8–6, 6–3.
1972	(United States) Bob Perry	(United States) Gene Malin	6–4, 6–2.
1973	(United States) John Norgauer	(United States) Bruce Manson	6–2, 6–3.

=== Women's singles ===
(incomplete roll)

Los Angeles City Championships
Year	Winners	Runners-up	Score
↓ ILTF World Circuit ↓
1915	(United States) Jessie Grieve	(United States) Nellita Schlotte	6–2, 6–2
1918	(United States) Gladys Archer Widdowson	(United States) Adelaide Taylor Rameson	6–0, 7–5
1920	(United States) Jessie Grieve (2)	(United States) Caroline Bryant	7–5, 6–3
1922	(United States) Marion Williams	(United States) Corinne Stanton Henry	6–2, 2–6, 6–4
1923	(United States) Corinne Stanton Henry	(United States) Jessie Grieve	6–1, 6–2
1929	(United States) Gladys Patz	(United States) Virginia Platt	6–4, 8–6
1930	(United States) Gladys Patz (2)	(United States) Gertrude Hauswald	6–0, 6–2
1931	(United States) Gladys Patz (3)	(United States) Esther Hare Bartosh	6–1, 6–2
1932	(United States) Ethel Burkhardt Arnold	(United States) Elizabeth Deike	6–4, 6–2
Los Angeles Metropolitan Championships
1933	(United States) Ethel Burkhardt Arnold (2)	(United States) May Doeg	6–2, 6–1
1934	(United States) Gracyn Wheeler	(United States) Beatrice Lidell	6–1, 4–6, 6–1
1936	(United States) Louise Martin	(United States) Elizabeth Deike	2–6, 6–4, 8–6
1937	(United States) Helen Germaine	(United States) Louise Martin	2–6, 6–4, 6–4
1938	(United States) Mary Arnold	(United States) Josephine Cruickshank	6–2, 1–0 retd.
1939	(United States) Mary Arnold (2)	(United States) Eleanor Purdy	6–3, 7–5
1940	(United States) Mary Arnold (3)	(United States) Catherine Malcolm	6–8, 6–3, 6–3
1942	(United States) Mary Arnold (4)	(United States) Gertrude H. Dockstader	6–4, 6–0
1947	(United States) Beverly Baker	(United States) Mary Arnold Prentiss	7–5, 1–0, retd.
1948	(United States) Mary Arnold Prentiss (5)	(United States) Beverly Baker	6–2, 10–8
1949	(United States) Beverly Baker	(United States) Gracyn Wheeler Kelleher	6–4, 6–3
1951	(United States) Mary Arnold Prentiss (6)	(United States) Julia Sampson	6–1, 6–2
1954	(United States) Mary Arnold Prentiss (7)	(United States) Darlene Hard	9–7, 1–6, 6–2
1955	(United States) Barbara Green	(United States) Darlene Hard	6–3, 8–6
1956	(United States) Darlene Hard	(United States) Joan Johnson	6–2, 6–2
1957	(United States) Joan Johnson	(United States) Marilyn Joseph	3–6, 6–3, 6–1
1958	(United States) Diane Wootton	(United States) Marilyn Joseph	6–2, 6–1
1960	(United States) Barbara Browning	(United States) Winnie McCoy	8–6, 6–4
1961	(United States) Joan Johnson (2)	(United States) Pat Cody	6–3, 10–8
1962	(United States) Barbara Green Weigandt (2)	(United States) Barbara Browning Rohland	8–6, 4–6, 6–4
1963	(United States) Kathy Harter	(United States) Pat Cody	6–2, 6–1
1964	(United States) Joan Johnson (3)	(United States) Patti Hogan	6–3, 6–3
1966	(United States) Pat Cody	(United States) Pam Teeguarden	1–6, 6–2, 6–4
1968	(United States) Betty Ann Grubb	(United States) Pam Teeguarden	7–5, 6–3
↓ Open era ↓
1969	(Canada) Faye Urban	(United States) Betty Ann Grubb	8–6, 6–3
1970	(United States) Pam Teeguarden	(United States) Winnie McCoy	6–0, 6–1
