= Steve Wilkinson (tennis) =

American tennis player and coach

- Full name: Stephen L. Wilkinson
- Country (sports): United States
- Born: March 29, 1941; Sioux City, Iowa, U.S.
- Died: January 21, 2015 (aged 73); St. Peter, Minnesota, U.S.
- College: University of Iowa

Coaching career (1971—2009)
- Eric Butorac

Coaching awards and records
- Records Winningiest head coach in collegiate tennis (922—278)

Stephen L. "Steve" Wilkinson (March 29, 1941 – January 21, 2015) was an American tennis player and tennis coach. As the head coach of Gustavus Adolphus College men's tennis team from 1971 till 2009, Wilkinson was the coach with most wins in the history of collegiate men’s tennis (929). He was also the No. 1 player in the United States in the 45-, 50-, 55-, and 60-and-over age groups, represented the US team in Dubler Cup, Perry Cup and Austria Cup and was a world team champion in 1989 (Uruguay) and word silver medalist 1992 (Germany). Wilkinson was inducted into United States Professional Tennis Association’s Hall of Fame, the USTA Missouri Valley Hall of Fame and the ITA Men’s Collegiate Tennis Hall of Fame.

== Biography ==
Steve Wilkinson was born in Sioux City, Iowa, in the family of Byron and Delpha Wilkinson. After graduating from Central High School in 1959 he took studies at the University of Iowa and graduated with a BSc in Accounting. Later he received a master's degree in Economics and a PhD in World Religions.

Steve, as he later recalled, picked a tennis racket at the age of three and was throwing tantrums until his parents would throw him tennis balls. He mostly learned playing by himself. He ranked as a No. 1 at the University of Iowa for 3 years during his academic studies and in the mid-1960s played for some time on the amateur circuit. He met his future wife Barbara Renk on a mountain top in Washington State; they married in Hamburg, Germany in 1966.

In 1970, Wilkinson started teaching World Religions and Ethics at Gustavus Adolphus College, St. Peter, Minnesota but soon enough, in 1971, assumed the position of the college men's tennis team that he retained for 39 years, till 2009. Under his guidance the Golden Gusties won between 922 and 929 matches while losing only 278 (a .77 win percentage). By the day of his death in 2015, this result was still standing as the most wins by a head coach in the history of collegiate men’s tennis. The Gusties won NCAA Division III Team Championship in 1980 and 1982, and in the Minnesota Intercollegiate Athletic Conference (MIAC) they won the title 35 times with a 334-1 record against conference opponents. in 39 years, 46 Gustavus Adolphus students (including future professional tour star Eric Butorac) were named for ITA All-America honors 87 times in total, won 6 national titles in doubles and 4 in singles. Steve Wilkinson himself was the NAIA Coach of the Year twice and ITA Division III National Coach of the Year three times: in 1982, 2001, and 2003.

Beside Steve's work at Gustavus Adolphus, in 1977 Steve and Barbara Wilkinson founded Tennis and Life Camps. The camps were held annually on the campus of Gustavus Adolphus and combined tennis training with music, skits and other usual camp activities. In their first year the camps hosted about 400 tennis players, the number that grew to around 1,500 players annually in 2000's. In January 2011 Steve, then 71 years old, and Barbara donated the Tennis and Life Camps, with Neal Hagberg named as the new director.

While coaching, Wilkinson kept playing in seniors' competitions. He took the top spots in the U.S. rankings in the 45-, 50-, 55-, and 60-and-over divisions and represented the country in Dubler Cup, Perry Cup and Austria Cup competitions. He was also a part of the teams that took world championship in Uruguay in 1989 in Uruguay and were vice champions in Germany in 1992.

Last seven years of his life Steve Wilkinson was suffering from kidney cancer. He died in his home in St. Peter, Minnesota, on January 21, 2015, and was survived by his wife and two daughters, Stephanie and Deborah. Not long before Steve's death, his memoir, Let Love Serve, was published.

== Awards and recognition ==
In 2007, Steve Wilkinson was named the national winner of the USTA/ITA Campus Recreation Award, which was creator for ITA coaches most successful in implementing recreational tennis programs on campus such as the USTA’s Tennis on Campus program and encouraging students to learn tennis. Wilkinson was also a recipient of the International Tennis Hall of Fame’s Tennis Educational Merit Award.

Wilkinson was inducted into ITA Men’s Collegiate Tennis Hall of Fame in 2010 and into the United States Professional Tennis Association (USPTA) Hall of Fame in 2013. In addition, he was inducted into the Gustavus Adolphus Athletics Hall of Fame, the USTA Missouri Valley Hall of Fame, the Northern Tennis Association Hall of Fame and the Iowa Tennis Hall of Fame. University of Iowa presented him with a Lifetime Achievement Award.
