= Debenture (sport) =

Certificate of agreement of loans in sport

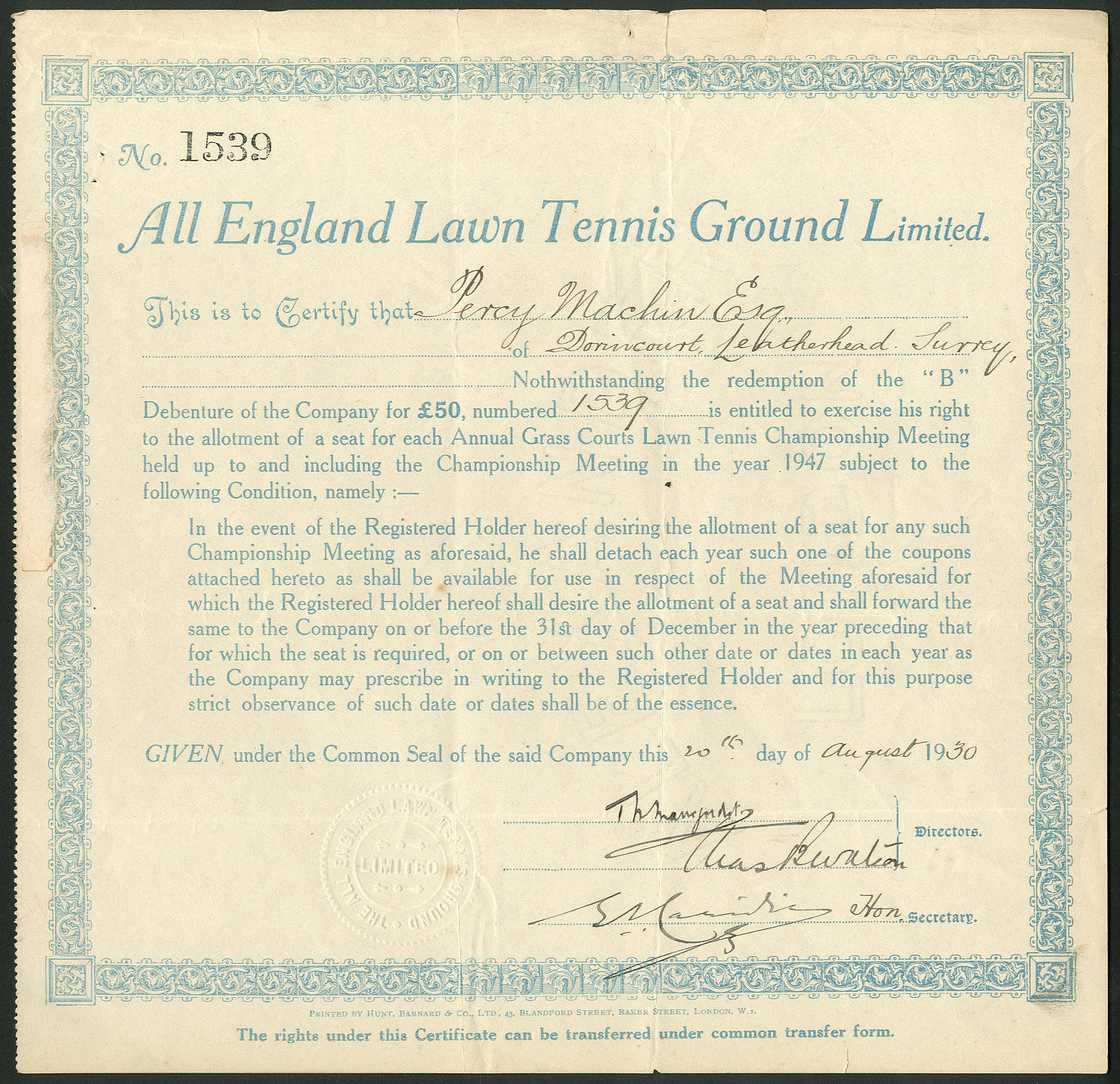
Debenture of the All England Lawn Tennis Ground Ltd., issued 20. August 1930

In sport, a debenture is defined as a certificate of agreement of loans which is given under the company's stamp and carries an undertaking that the debenture holder will get a fixed return (fixed on the basis of interest rates) and the principal amount whenever the debenture matures. The terms may also include ancillary benefits such as an option to buy tickets at a favourable price, as well as or instead of interest. The term stems from the financial concept of a debenture.

A large number of sporting organisations have issued debentures to raise money, to allow their fans to gain a financial stake in the club, to foster a sense of community, and in some cases to fund new construction.

== Royal Albert Hall ==
An early example of debenture holders having rights to seats at venues was the Royal Albert Hall in London, where about 1,200 of the hall's 5,500 seats were provided on 999-year leases when it opened in 1871 to help finance its construction costs, allowing access to most of its music, sporting and other events, subject to an annual service charge. The debentures can be passed on or sold, and the tickets to individual events can be resold if the debenture holder does not wish to attend.

== Tennis ==
The organisers of the Wimbledon Tennis Championships, The All England Club, issue their debenture holders a ticket for each day of the tournament. Furthermore, only debenture holders are permitted to sell their tickets to third parties, either privately or through vendors.

== Rugby ==
A rugby debenture is somewhat different as, in the most part, no money in the form of interest is returned to the lender but the rights to obtain tickets for a seat in that ground. The exact terms of the debentures vary from issue to issue but will be covered in the main here. Charlton Athletic also used this financial method to aid their move back to The Valley.

=== Welsh Rugby Union ===
These debentures carry no interest on the amount invested and the advantage of holding said debenture is the right to obtain tickets at the Millennium Stadium, the home of the Welsh Rugby Union where Wales play in the Six Nations Championship.

The serial numbers on the debentures denominate the expiry date (although some are renewable and / or renewed earlier), starting with:

Certificate starts with	Expiry date	Surrender value
05	1 March 2021	£50
100	1 March 2021	£100
200	1 September 2028	£200
300	1 September 2035	£500
410	31 August 2024	£5,000
420	31 August 2024	£3,750
430	31 August 2024	£3,950
440	31 August 2024	£3,950
450	1 September 2027	£5,000
460	1 August 2030	£3,950
470	1 September 2030	£6,000

The WRU has changed some of the numbers during the term of the debenture.

=== Rugby Football Union ===
These are issued by the RFU and permit the holder to 10 years rights to the ticket issue; they are transferable and the principal sum invested is returned 75 years from date of issue.

An RFU debenture confers on the debenture holder the right to purchase, at face value, one ticket for Rugby Union events at Twickenham Stadium for a given period, currently 10 years (with the exception of a small number of business debentures in the South Stand which confer ticket rights for 15 years). A debenture is fully repayable, currently after 75 years, but bears no interest.

The following is the current debenture issue:

Date of issue	Number of private and initial cost	Number of business and initial cost
2000	1,269 @ £3,950	418 @ £12,000
2001	1,068 @ £3,950	216 @ £12,000
2002	868 @ £4,350	28 @ £12,000
2003	3,751 @ £4,750	135 @ £12,000
2004	1,052 @ £4,750	28 @ £12,000
2005	2,314 @ £5,250	58 @ £12,000
2006	3,295 @ £6,000	279 @ £14,000
2007	102 @ £14,000	0
2008	1,000 @ £6,750	96 @ £14,000

== Other sports organisations ==
Other sports organisations which issue debentures in a similar fashion include:

- Arsenal Football Club
- Donington Park
- Hampden Park
- Millennium Stadium
- Murrayfield Stadium
- Nottinghamshire County Cricket Club
- Twickenham Stadium
- Wembley Stadium

Not all sporting debentures provide an entitlement to free tickets. Some organisations, such as the Millennium Stadium, merely give holders the right to purchase a ticket for events.

== See also ==
- Personal seat license, an analogous concept amongst US sports franchises
