= Personal seat license =

License entitling a holder to the right to buy season tickets at a stadium

A personal seat license, or PSL, is a paid license that entitles the holder to the right to buy season tickets for a certain seat in a stadium. This holder can sell the seat license to someone else if they no longer wish to purchase season tickets. However, if the seat license holder chooses not to sell the seat licenses and does not renew the season tickets, the holder forfeits the license back to the team. Most seat licenses are valid for as long as the team plays in the current venue.

As each PSL corresponds to a specific seat, the venue operator can charge different prices for each individual seat. From the fan's perspective, having a specific seat removed the necessity of searching for an open seat in a filled stadium. Newly built sporting venues often offer PSLs to help pay the debt incurred during the construction of the venue. Opponents of PSLs see this as another way to increase the price that fans must afford to attend the venue, which may price out a number of fans from a venue.

As an investment PSLs are generally viewed as not being a proper investment or a risky investment as despite PSLs being able to be transferred to sold to other people their value is not guaranteed and can decrease, especially in situations where a team has a period of poor performance and/or the stadium declines in quality or ages causing a decline in demand in tickets and thus PSLs they are also generally considered more valuable in larger, richer markets compared to smaller, poorer ones.

Seat licenses have been given various names. In North America, they are primarily called personal seat licenses or permanent seat licenses, while in Europe they are usually called debentures.

== Origin of seat licenses ==
There are varying accounts as to the origin of the personal seat license.

According to one account, the first personal seat license plan was developed in 1986 at Stanford University by legendary tennis coach Dick Gould. Seeking financing for a new tennis stadium, Gould came up with the idea of selling the rights to seats, a licensing plan under which purchaser's name is engraved in the seat, and the purchaser owns the right to have first choice for tickets for any event held in the stadium.

According to a second account, the permanent seat license was invented by a Columbus, Ohio architect, Rick Ohanian, in January 1987. Ohanian described his plan in a Letter to The Editor of the Columbus Dispatch, published on March 2, 1987, entitled "Ticketbond is Answer to Financing Proposed Facility".

According to a third account, the permanent seat license was invented by Charlotte sports marketing agent Max Muhleman, in 1993. Muhleman is credited as the founder of the first PSLs at Charlotte's then Carolinas Stadium. The idea began as "Charter Seat Rights”, an idea Muhleman suggested to Charlotte Hornets owner George Shinn as a way to reward those who bought season tickets and helped Shinn get the team in the 1980s. The Hornets' season ticket holders received these rights for free, but people sold them like a commodity. This gave Muhleman the idea to use a similar concept, which fans would pay for, to finance the stadium.

In 1969, the Dallas Cowboys used stadium bonds to finance the construction of Texas Stadium in Irving. The purchase of the bond entitled the bond holder to purchase season tickets for the Cowboys.

Others cite similar programs that were in existence among many college fund raising activities prior to 1987. However, the early programs were tax-deductible donations to a scholarship fund, in which case the main "quid-pro-quo" was between the donation and the resultant deduction, not between the donation and the actual seating rights.

== Sports teams and organizations employing seat licenses ==
Some of the teams that have seat licenses include:

=== Automotive racing ===
- Auto Club Speedway PSL
- Circuit of the Americas PSL
- Kentucky Speedway PSL
- Texas Motor Speedway PSL

=== Major League Baseball ===
- Arizona Diamondbacks Legacy Club Seat Licenses
- Minnesota Twins Legends Club Memberships (effective at Target Field only)
- San Diego Padres Founders Club Memberships
- San Francisco Giants CSL Charter Seat Licenses
- St. Louis Cardinals Ballpark Founders Club Seat Licenses

=== National Basketball Association ===
- Charlotte Hornets PSL
- Golden State Warriors Membership
  - Instituted in 2017 for all season tickets at the team's future home of Chase Center, opening in 2019. The Warriors became the first NBA team with a broad-based PSL. The PSL, which runs for 30 years, can either be given back to the team or transferred at any time, although it cannot be sold for more than its face value, prorated for the number of years remaining on the license. At the end of the license period, the face value of the license will be returned to the original owner (or heirs) if it has never been transferred. If the license is transferred, the team must be notified of the price; if the price paid falls short of the full price less payments already made, the team will return the difference to the original owner at the end of the license period. The PSL operates as an interest-free loan to the team.
- Toronto Raptors PSL
  - Used only for the best seats at Scotiabank Arena; also provides rights for Maple Leafs tickets.
- Utah Jazz PSL
  - Instituted in 1987 by then-owner Larry Miller only for courtside seats at the Salt Palace, with the upfront money used for team expenses. Not used at the team's current home of Vivint Smart Home Arena.

=== National Football League ===
- Atlanta Falcons PSL
- Baltimore Ravens PSL
- Buffalo Bills PSL (starting in 2026)
- Carolina Panthers PSL
- Chicago Bears PSL
- Cincinnati Bengals COA (Charter Ownership Agreements)
- Cleveland Browns PSL
- Green Bay Packers as a User Fee
- Dallas Cowboys SL (Seat Licenses) (Effective at AT&T Stadium only.)
- Houston Texans PSL
- Los Angeles Chargers SSL (Stadium Seat License)
- Los Angeles Rams SSL (Stadium Seat License)
- Las Vegas Raiders PSL
- Minnesota Vikings SBL (Stadium Builder Licenses) (U.S. Bank Stadium only)
- New York Giants PSL (Effective at MetLife Stadium only. Buying Giants PSL does not give ticket rights for the Jets.)
- New York Jets PSL (Effective at MetLife Stadium only. Policies differ from the Giants. Buying Jets PSL does not give ticket rights for the Giants.)
- Philadelphia Eagles SBL (Stadium Builder Licenses)
- Pittsburgh Steelers SL
- San Francisco 49ers SBL (Stadium Builder Licenses)
- Seattle Seahawks CSL (Charter Seat Licenses)
- Tennessee Titans PSL

=== National Hockey League ===
- Columbus Blue Jackets PSL
- Toronto Maple Leafs PSL

=== National Rugby League ===
- Gold Coast Titans PSR (Personal Seat Right)

== PSL lawsuit ==
In 2019, a U.S. District Judge ordered Stan Kroenke and the Los Angeles Rams to issue a partial refund to personal seat license holders of the former St. Louis Rams, under the terms of a settlement reached in June 2019. The Los Angeles Rams moved from Los Angeles to St. Louis in 1995 and issued personal seat licenses.

Disputes over the condition of the leased venue, and disputes between Rams ownership and St. Louis City leadership ultimately led to the Rams returning to Los Angeles. Fans who had purchased a personal seat license still had 9 years left on their original contract, and filed a class action lawsuit in February 2016.

== See also ==
- Debenture (sport)
