= Debenture =

Debt instrument

In corporate finance, a debenture is a medium- to long-term debt instrument used by large companies to borrow money at a fixed rate of interest. The legal term "debenture" originally referred to a document that either creates a debt or acknowledges it, but in some countries the term is now used interchangeably with bond, loan stock or note. A debenture is thus like a certificate of loan or a loan bond evidencing the company's liability to pay a specified amount with interest. Although the money raised by the debentures becomes a part of the company's capital structure, it does not become share capital. Senior debentures get paid before subordinate debentures, and there are varying rates of risk and payoff for these categories. In a bankruptcy, debentures get paid before stock holders are paid.

Debentures are freely transferable by the debenture holder. Debenture holders have no rights to vote in the company's general meetings of shareholders, but they may have separate meetings or votes e.g. on changes to the rights attached to the debentures. The interest paid to them is a charge against profit in the company's financial statements.

The term "debenture" is more descriptive than definitive. An exact and all-encompassing definition for a debenture has proved elusive. The English commercial judge Lord Lindley notably remarked in one case: "Now, what the correct meaning of 'debenture' is I do not know. I do not find anywhere any precise definition of it. We know that there are various kinds of instruments commonly called debentures."

== Attributes ==
- A movable property or assets
- Issued by a company in the form of a certificate of indebtedness
- Generally specifying the dates of redemption, repayment of principal and payment of interest
- May or may not create a charge on the assets of the company
- Corporations in the US often issue bonds of around $1,000, while government bonds are more likely to be $5,000

Debentures gave rise to the idea of the rich "clipping their coupons", which means that a bondholder will present their "coupon" to the bank and receive a payment each quarter (or in whatever period is specified in the agreement).

There are also other features that minimize risk, such as a "sinking fund", which means that the debtor must pay some of the value of the bond after a specified period of time. This decreases risk for the creditors, as a hedge against inflation, bankruptcy, or other risk factors. A sinking fund makes the bond less risky, and therefore gives it a smaller "coupon" (or interest payment). There are also options for "convertibility", which means a creditor may turn their bonds into equity in the company if it does well. Companies also reserve the right to call their bonds, which mean they can call it sooner than the maturity date. Often there is a clause in the contract that allows this; for example, if a bond issuer wishes to rebook a 30-year bond at the 25th year, they must pay a premium. If a bond is called, it means that less interest is paid out.

Failure to pay a bond effectively means bankruptcy. Bondholders who have not received their interest can throw an offending company into bankruptcy, or seize its assets if that is stipulated in the contract.

== Security in different jurisdictions ==
In the United States, debenture refers specifically to an unsecured corporate bond, i.e. a bond that does not have a certain line of income or piece of property or equipment to guarantee repayment of principal upon the bond's maturity. Where security is provided for loan stocks or bonds in the US, they are termed "mortgage bonds".

In the United Kingdom a debenture is usually secured.

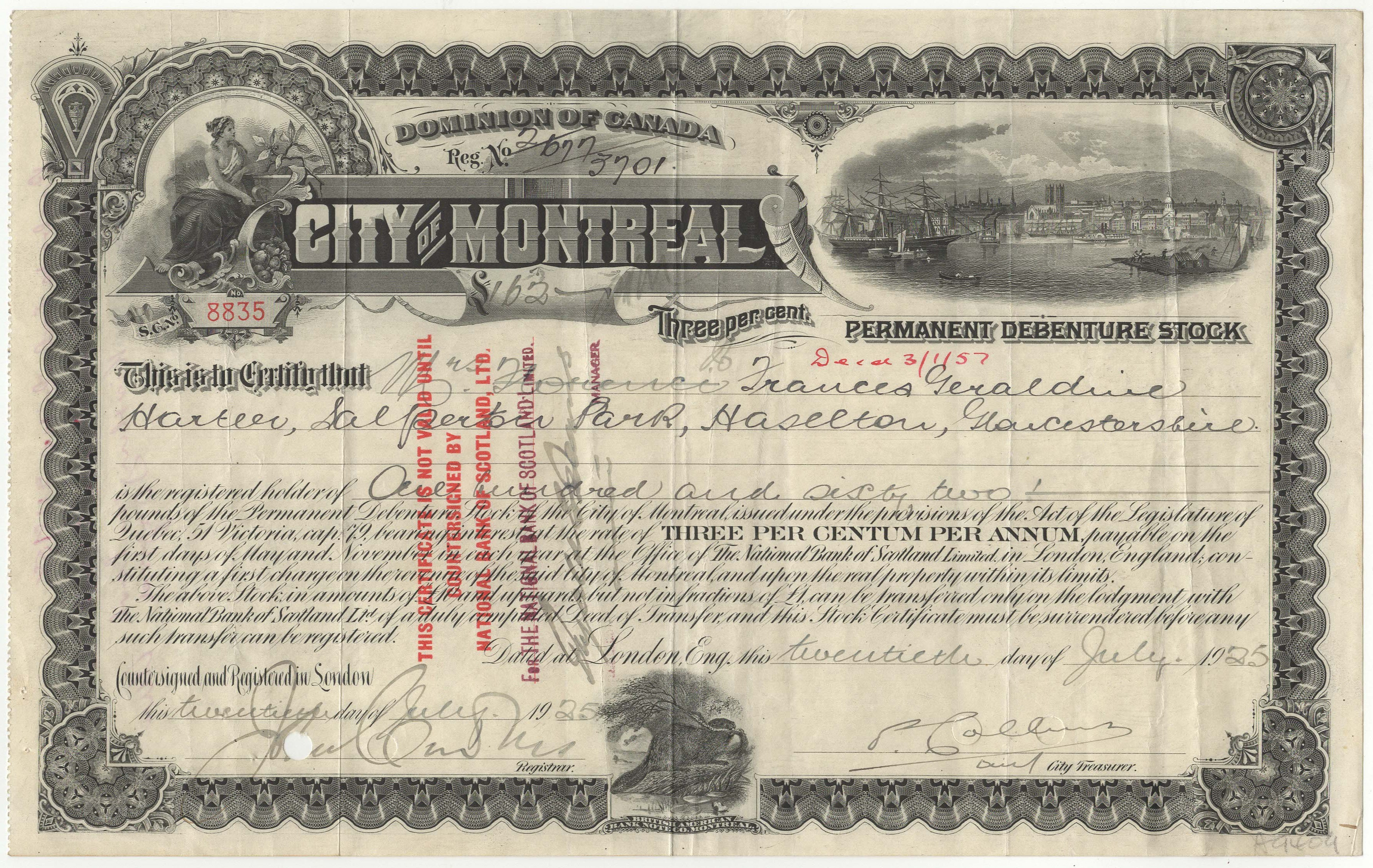
Permanent Debenture Stock of the City of Montreal, issued 20 July 1925

In Canada, a debenture refers to a secured loan instrument where security is generally over the debtor's credit, but security is not pledged to specific assets. Like other secured debts, the debenture gives the debtor priority status over unsecured creditors in a bankruptcy.

In Asia, if repayment is secured by a charge over land, the loan document is called a mortgage; where repayment is secured by a charge against other assets of the company, the document is called a debenture; and where no security is involved, the document is called a note or "unsecured deposit note".

== Convertibility ==
There are two types of debentures:

1. Convertible debentures, which are convertible bonds or bonds that can be converted into equity shares of the issuing company after a predetermined period of time. "Convertibility" is a feature that corporations may add to the bonds they issue to make them more attractive to buyers. In other words, it is a special feature that a corporate bond may carry. As a result of the advantage a buyer gets from the ability to convert, convertible bonds typically have lower interest rates than non-convertible corporate bonds.
2. Non-convertible debentures (NCD), which are simply regular debentures, cannot be converted into equity shares of the liable company. They are debentures without the convertibility feature attached to them. As a result, they usually carry higher interest rates than their convertible counterparts.

== See also ==
- Debenture (sport), which may additionally give seating rights
