= March of Dimes Open =

Defunct tennis tournament
- Tour: ILTF World Circuit (1930–69, 70–72); ILTF Independent Tour (1970–72) men
- Founded: 1955; 70 years ago
- Abolished: 1974; 51 years ago
- Location: San Diego, United States
- Venue: Kona Kai Club
- Surface: Hard outdoors

The March of Dimes Open also known as the March of Dimes Tennis Tournament was an international men's and women's hardcourt tennis tournament founded in 1955. It was first played at the Kona Kai Club, Shelter Island, San Diego, United States. This international tournament was part of the ILTF World Circuit until 1974 when it was discontinued.

== History ==
In 1955 the March of Dimes Tennis Tournament was established. The tournament was played on outdoor hard courts at the Kona Kai Club, Shelter Island, San Diego, United States. The combined tournament was played until 1969 as part of the ILTF World Circuit. In 1970 the men's event became part of ILTF Independent Tour, the women's event joined the same tour in 1973 following the creation of the WTA Tour. This tournament was usually played in mid to late January ending early February each year, in 1970 two editions of the event were held the main winter finals, and a March of Dimes Fall Open in November that year for one edition only.

== Finals (Winter) ==
=== Men's singles ===
(incomplete roll)

Year	Winners	Runners-up	Score
↓ ILTF World Circuit ↓
1955	(Peru) Alex Olmedo	(United States) Noel Brown	6–1, 6–1, 6–3.
1963	(United States) Dennis Ralston	(United States) Hugh Stewart	6–3, 6–4.
1964	(United States) Allen Fox	(United States) Tom Edlefsen	6–2, 6–0.
1966	(United States) David Sanderlin	(United States) James Rombeau	6–4, 6–4.
1968	(Mexico) Joaquín Loyo-Mayo	(United States) Bob Lutz	6–2, 4–6, 8–6.
↓ Open era ↓
1969	(United States) Bill Bond	(Mexico) Joaquín Loyo-Mayo	6–4, 3–6, 6–3.
1970	(United States) Roy Barth	(Argentina) Tito Vázquez	6–1, 6–1.

=== Women's singles ===
(incomplete roll)

Year	Winners	Runners-up	Score
↓ ILTF World Circuit ↓
1961	(United States) Kathy Chabot	(United States) Karen Hantze	3–6, 6–1, 6–4
1965	(United States) Val Ziegenfuss	(United States) Paulette Verzin	6–1, 7–9, 6–1
1966	(United States) Val Ziegenfuss	(United States) Kristien Kemmer	6–1, 6–1
↓ Open era ↓
1969	(United States) Janet Newberry	(United States) Mary Struthers	6–2, 6–1.
1970	(United States) Nancy Ornstein	(United States) Janet Newberry	3–6, 6–4, 7–5
1973	(United States) Anne Bruning	(United States) Susan Hagey	1–6, 6–1, 6–3

== Finals (Fall) ==
=== Men's singles ===
Year	Winners	Runners-up	Score
↓ ILTF World Circuit ↓
1970	(Pakistan) Haroon Rahim	(United States) Jimmy Connors	6–8, 6–3, 9–7.

=== Women's singles ===
Year	Winners	Runners-up	Score
↓ ILTF World Circuit ↓
1970	(United States) Janet Newberry	(United States) Marita Redondo	8–6, 6–1.
