= Luke Smith (tennis) =

Australian tennis player (born 1976)

- Country (sports): Australia
- Born: 25 October 1976 (age 49) Adelaide, Australia
- Height: 188 cm (6 ft 2 in)
- Turned pro: Right-handed
- Plays: 1997
- Prize money: $84,208

Singles
- Career record: 2–5
- Career titles: 0
- Highest ranking: No. 363 (24 Nov 1997)

Grand Slam singles results
- Australian Open: 1R (1998)
- US Open: 1R (1997)

Doubles
- Career record: 5–8
- Career titles: 0
- Highest ranking: No. 155 (25 Jun 2001)

Grand Slam doubles results
- Australian Open: 3R (1998, 2001)
- US Open: 1R (1997)

Luke Smith (born 25 October 1976) is a former professional tennis player from Australia.

== Career ==
Smith played collegiate tennis with the UNLV Rebels and won both the NCAA Division I singles and doubles titles in 1997. He defeated Southern California's George Bastl in the singles final. In the doubles final, Smith and Tim Blenkiron beat Bastl and Kyle Spencer. In 1997 he also made the third round of an ATP Tour tournament in Washington, D.C., with wins over Mahesh Bhupathi and Lionel Roux.

Smith lost in the opening round in both of his appearances in the main draw of a Grand Slam tournament, to Marcelo Ríos at the 1997 US Open and Andrei Medvedev at the 1998 Australian Open. He twice reached the third round of the Australian Open men's doubles, with Lleyton Hewitt at the 1998 Australian Open and Paul Baccanello at the 2001 Australian Open.
