= Sports information director =

A sports information director is a type of public relations worker who provides statistics, team, and player notes, as well as other information about a college or university's sports teams to the news media and public. Abbreviated as "SID," sports information directors often have varying titles, such as media relations director, director of athletics communications, and communications director.

SIDs are generally responsible for a number of external publicity efforts by an athletics department. This ranges from updating and maintaining the content on the school's athletics website and social media accounts to statistics management to historical records keeping. SIDs also are often responsible for the production of official publications, most notably media guides, game notes and game programs. Media guides are used both as a resource for the news media and as a recruiting piece for the individual teams.

The College Sports Information Directors of America (CoSIDA) provides an organizational structure for SIDs at all collegiate levels in the United States and Canada. The organization has named Academic All-Americans since 1952. CoSIDA also provides career resources for potential SIDs such as job postings and résumé exchanges.

Some schools offer academic programming aimed at training future sports information directors. Duquesne University, for example, offers a major and a minor in "Sports Information and Media."
