= Glenn Bassett =

American tennis player (1927–2020)

- Full name: Glenn Noble Bassett
- Country (sports): USA
- Born: May 22, 1927 Salt Lake City, Utah, U.S.A.
- Died: 18 August 2020 (aged 93) Laguna Niguel, Orange County, California, U.S.A.

Singles
- Career record: 112-64
- Career titles: 14

Glenn Noble Bassett (May 22, 1927 – August 18, 2020) was an American tennis player in the mid-20th century who later would be one of the most successful college tennis coaches of all time.

== Early ==
Bassett was born in Salt Lake City, Utah. His family moved to California in 1929 and to Santa Monica, California when he was twelve. He attended Lincoln Junior High School where he took up tennis practicing by hitting the ball against the garage door. He became a star quickly in tournaments by the time he attended Santa Monica High School. He would later return there as a teacher and a winning coach that led Samohi to five straight CIF team titles (1962 – 1966) which in turn led to his offer to coach at his beloved alma mater, UCLA.

== Career ==
=== Player ===
Bassett was the co-captain (with Herb Flam) of the University of California at Los Angeles tennis team that won the NCAA championship 1950. Also in 1950, he won the singles title at the Cincinnati Masters, defeating Ham Richardson in the final in four sets.

Bassett won the Pacific Northwest Championships in Tacoma, Washington in 1956 and 1958 and the West Hollywood Championships at Plummer Park in West Hollywood in 1958 (defeating Norm Perry in the final), 1959, and 1960 (defeating Vladimir Petrović in the final).

=== Coach ===
Bassett graduated from UCLA in 1951, and would go on to coach the UCLA tennis team for 27 seasons (from 1967 to 1993). At UCLA, he compiled a record of 592-92-2, winning 13 conference championships, seven NCAA team championships (1970, 1971, 1975, 1976, 1979, 1982 and 1984) and producing three NCAA singles champions, four NCAA doubles team champions and 49 All-Americans.

After leaving the Bruins, he became a volunteer coach at Pepperdine in 1994 and 1995 and assumed the head coaching position in 1996, leading Pepperdine to a 22–7 season.

== Honors, awards, distinctions ==
Bassett is the only person in NCAA history to win an NCAA tennis title as a player, assistant coach and head coach. While at UCLA, Bassett worked with some of tennis’ most recognized players, including national champions Arthur Ashe, Ian Crookenden, Billy Martin, Brian Teacher, and Jimmy Connors, and 1992 Olympian Mark Knowles.

Bassett was inducted into the UCLA Athletics Hall of Fame in 1998, the ITA Collegiate Tennis Hall of Fame in 1993, the Southern California Tennis Association Hall of Fame in 2005, and the Santa Monica College Sports Hall Of Fame in 2008.

== Publications ==
Bassett wrote books on tennis, i.e., Tennis Today and Tennis: The Bassett System.

== Death ==
Bassett died on August 18, 2020, at the age of 93.
