= Manuel Diaz (tennis) =

American tennis coach

- Country (sports): Puerto Rico
- Born: San Juan, Puerto Rico

Singles
- Career record: 2–4
- Highest ranking: No. 292 (January 4, 1981)

Doubles
- Career record: 1–2
- Highest ranking: No. 552 (December 26, 1979)

Grand Slam doubles results
- US Open: 1R (1980)

Manuel Diaz (born San Juan, Puerto Rico) is the former long-time head tennis coach at the University of Georgia. He has coached the Bulldogs to four NCAA championships, in 1999, 2001, 2007, when John Isner headed the team, and 2008. He has also lead the program to its only two Intercollegiate Tennis Association Team Indoor National Championships, winning it in back-to-back years in 2007 and 2008. He holds the all-time SEC wins record with 767 victories as the head coach; he retired at the end of the 2024 season.

Diaz has had three players win five NCAA singles national championships.

He was inducted into the Georgia Tennis Hall of Fame in 2000, the Georgia Sports Hall of Fame in 2017 and is set to be inducted into the USTA Southern Tennis Hall of Fame in 2024.

== General references ==
- "Manuel Diaz Bio | Men's Tennis". georgiadogs.com. University of Georgia. Archived from the original on May 20, 2017.
