= Noel Brown =

American tennis player (1926–2021)

- Full name: Noel Abner Brown
- Country (sports): USA
- Born: March 21, 1926
- Died: April 2021 (aged 95)
- Plays: Right-handed

Singles
- Career record: 208–79
- Career titles: 31
- Highest ranking: 8 (USTA)

Noel Abner Brown (March 21, 1926 – April 2021) was an American tennis player in the mid-20th century. He was born in Stamford, Texas.

Brown was captain of the University of California at Los Angeles tennis team in 1946.

Out of 31 career titles, his most notable were two singles titles, in 1952 at Cincinnati, and in 1956 at Canada. The latter event was held on grass in Vancouver, where he defeated the top two Canadian players, Bob Bédard and Don Fontana in the semifinal and final respectively. He also won the doubles title at Canada in 1956.

Brown was ranked in the U.S. Top Ten three times: in 1952 (No. 9), 1953 (No. 9) and 1959 (No. 8).

He died in April 2021, at the age of 95.
