= Intercollegiate Tennis Association =

Organization of coaches and collegiate tennis players

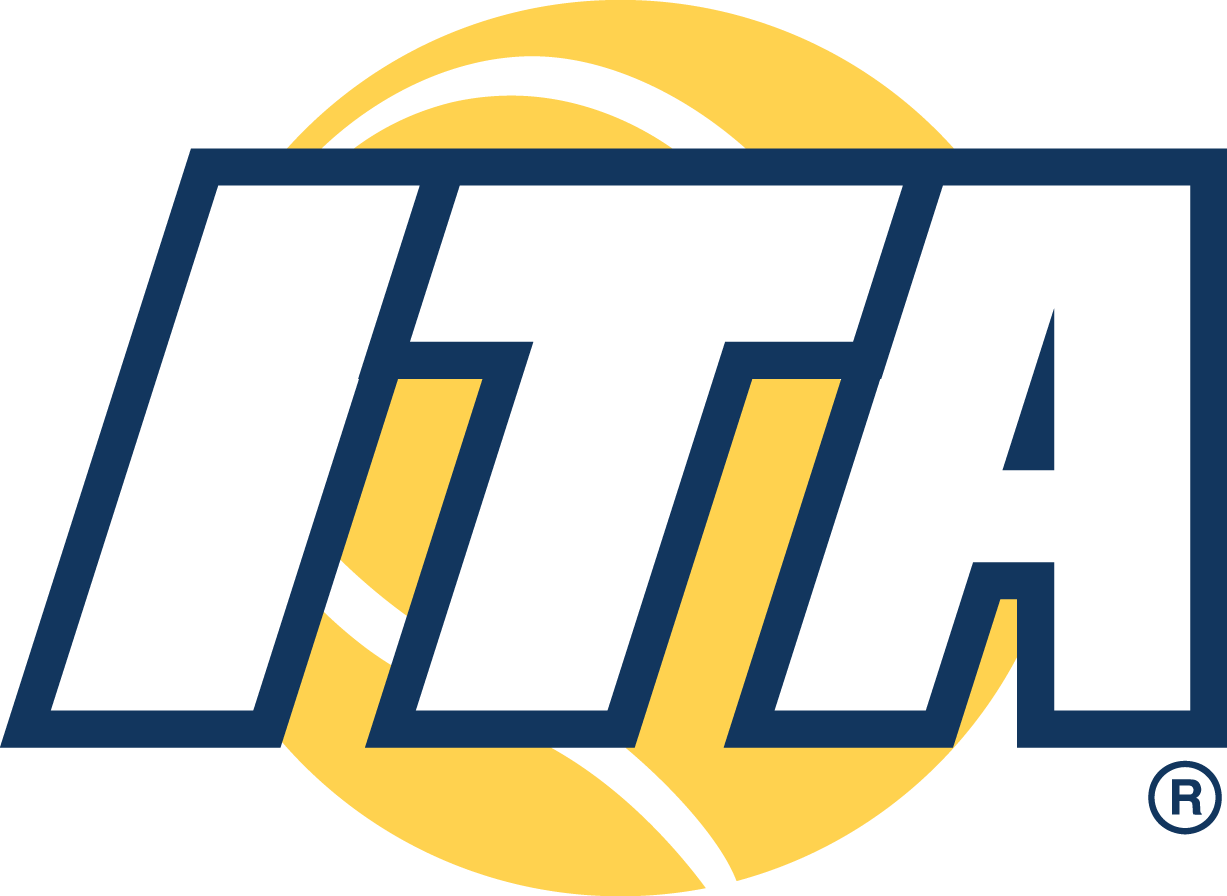
- Formation: June 1956
- Location: Tempe, Arizona, U.S.
- Website: www.wearecollegetennis.com

The Intercollegiate Tennis Association (ITA) is the governing body and coaches' association of United States college tennis, both an advocate and authority, overseeing men's and women's varsity tennis at all levels – NCAA Division I, NCAA Division II, NCAA Division III, NAIA, and Junior/Community College. The ITA headquarters are located in Tempe, Arizona, with the Men's Hall of Fame located at the University of Georgia and the Women's Hall of Fame located at the College of William & Mary.

== History ==
Originally founded in 1956 by the legendary UCLA men's tennis coach, J. D. Morgan, the Intercollegiate Tennis Association (ITA) is the governing body of college tennis, overseeing men's and women's varsity tennis at all levels – NCAA Divisions I, II and III, NAIA and Junior/Community College. Officially incorporated in 1978 as the Intercollegiate Tennis Coaches Association (ITCA), for more than 65 years, the ITA has worked hard to achieve its charter goals: (1) “To foster and encourage the playing of intercollegiate tennis in accordance with the highest tradition of sportsmanship and consistent with the general objectives of higher education.” (2) “To develop among the intercollegiate coaches a deeper sense of responsibility in teaching, promoting, maintaining, and conducting the game of tennis.” And, (3) “To educate and serve those individuals and groups who are involved in collegiate tennis: junior and college players, their coaches and parents, and the at-large tennis public.”

Former Princeton tennis coach, David A Benjamin, became the head of the organization in 1979, first as the elected president before serving as the executive director from 1983 to 2016. Since 2016, the ITA headquarters has been located in Tempe, Arizona, near the Arizona State University (ASU) campus. The current chief executive officer is Dr. Timothy Russell.

== Major championships ==
Except for the NCAA Championships, the ITA is responsible for organizing the vast majority of collegiate national championships over the spring, summer, and fall. Today, the ITA runs 13 national events for schools and student-athletes across all five divisions of play. The ITA is widely considered as the most influential and active governing body to their sport amongst all collegiate sports.

ITA Team Championships:

- ITA National Team Indoor Championships
  - Division I Men's National Team Indoor Championships | February 17–20, 2023 | Chicago, IL
  - Division I Women's National Team Indoor Championships | February 10–13, 2023 | Seattle, WA
  - Division II Men's National Team Indoor Championships | February 17–19, 2023 | Indianapolis, IN
  - Division II Women's National Team Indoor Championships | February 24–26, 2023 | Kearney, NE
  - Division III Men's National Team Indoor Championships | February 24–26, 2023 | St. Peter, MN
  - Division III Women's National Team Indoor Championships | March 3–5, 2023 | Nicholasville, KY
  - NAIA Men's National Team Indoor Championships | February 3–5, 2023 | Overland Park, KS
  - NAIA Women's National Team Indoor Championships | February 3–5, 2023 | Overland Park, KS

ITA Individual Championships:

- ITA All-American Championships
  - Men's All-American Championships | October 1–9, 2022 | Tulsa, OK
  - Women's All-American Championships | October 1–9, 2022 | Cary, NC
- ITA Cup | October 13–16, 2022 | Rome, GA
- ITA National Fall Championships | November 2–6, 2022 | San Diego, CA
- ITA/Tennis-Point National Summer Championships | August 11–16, 2022 | Tallahassee, FL

== Awards ==
Various national and regional awards are presented by ITA in recognition of outstanding performances in men's and women's college tennis each year.

The awards include:

- ITA National College Player of the Year Awards
- ITA/Arthur Ashe Leadership and Sportsmanship Awards
- ITA Senior/Sophomore Player of the Year Awards
- ITA Rookie Player of the Year Awards
- ITA Scholar Athlete Awards
- ITA All-Academic Team Awards (team GPA award)
- Cissie Leary/ITA Award for Sportsmanship (Women Div. I)
- Rafael Osuna/ITA Award for Sportsmanship (Men Div. I)
- ITA Meritorious Service Award, presented by ConantLeadership
- Steve Wilkinson Team Sportsmanship Award
- ITA Collegiate All-Star Team (composed of top players from all divisions)
- USTA Collegiate Summer Team (traveling team)
- Wilson/ITA Coach of the Year Awards
- ITA Assistant Coach of the Year Awards
- ITA Most Improved Senior/Sophomore of the Year Award
- ITA Achievement Award (awarded to varsity collegiate tennis alumni)

== Hall of Fame ==
The ITA Men's Hall of Fame is located at the University of Georgia’s Dan Magill Tennis Complex in Athens, Georgia, and the ITA Women's Hall of Fame is located at the McCormack-Nagelsen Tennis Center at the College of William & Mary in Williamsburg, Virginia.

The ITA Women's Collegiate Tennis Hall of Fame was created to "celebrate the milestones in women's collegiate tennis, from the early struggles for recognition to the achievement of full-fledged intercollegiate competition."

== ITA Collegiate Tennis Rankings ==
The Intercollegiate Tennis Association (ITA) administers college tennis rankings that are designed to track the top men and women tennis players and teams in NCAA DI, II, III, NAIA and Junior Colleges (JUCO).

ITA Tennis rankings
