= 2016 AFF Women's Championship squads =

Below are the squads for the 2016 AFF Women's Championship, hosted by Myanmar, which is taking place between 26 July - 4 August 2016.

== Group A ==
=== Philippines ===
Head coach: Buda Bautista

| No. | Pos. | Player | Date of birth (age) | Club |
|---|---|---|---|---|
| 1 | GK | Inna Palacios | 8 February 1994 (aged 22) | (Philippine Football Federation) De La Salle Lady Booters |
| 22 | GK | Patricia Dull | 17 October 1997 (aged 18) | (United States Soccer Federation) Chicago Maroons |
| 2 | DF | Claire Lim | 24 October 1996 (aged 19) | (United States Soccer Federation) UC Santa Cruz Banana Slugs |
| 5 | DF | Hali Long | 21 January 1995 (aged 21) | (United States Soccer Federation) Arkansas–Little Rock Trojans |
| 16 | DF | Monica Manalansan | 29 June 1993 (aged 23) | (Philippine Football Federation) UP Lady Booters |
| 17 | DF | Natasha Alquiros | 17 January 1991 (aged 25) | (Philippine Football Federation) Green Archers United |
| 20 | DF | Alesa Dolino | 26 October 1992 (aged 23) | (Philippine Football Federation) FEU Lady Tamaraws |
| 23 | DF | Patricia Tomanon | 10 April 1994 (aged 22) | (United States Soccer Federation) FIU Panthers |
| 28 | DF | Mary Duran | 28 March 1997 (aged 19) | (United States Soccer Federation) Franciscan Barons |
| 3 | MF | Krystal de Ramos | 16 March 1997 (aged 19) | (United States Soccer Federation) Portland State Vikings |
| 8 | MF | Shelby Salvacion | 6 February 1992 (aged 24) | Unattached |
| 9 | MF | Irish Navaja | 12 May 1997 (aged 19) | (Philippine Football Federation) De La Salle Lady Booters |
| 14 | MF | Sara Castañeda | 5 December 1996 (aged 19) | (Philippine Football Federation) De La Salle Lady Booters |
| 18 | MF | Camille Wilson | 12 February 1995 (aged 21) | (United States Soccer Federation) San Francisco Dons |
| 21 | MF | Sidra Bugsch | 12 April 1999 (aged 17) | (United States Soccer Federation) Davis Legacy |
| 26 | MF | Hanna Parado | 30 January 1996 (aged 20) | (United States Soccer Federation) North Florida Ospreys |
| 4 | FW | Heather Cooke | 25 December 1988 (aged 27) | Unattached |
| 6 | FW | Christina de los Reyes | 28 February 1994 (aged 22) | (Philippine Football Federation) UP Lady Booters |
| 10 | FW | Caitlyn Kreutz | 28 January 1997 (aged 19) | (United States Soccer Federation) Cal Poly Mustangs |

=== Singapore ===
Head coach: Chen Caiying

| No. | Pos. | Player | Date of birth (age) | Caps | Goals | Club |
|---|---|---|---|---|---|---|
| 1 | GK | Noor Kusumawati bte Mohammad Rosman | 29 September 1990 (aged 25) | | | (Football Association of Singapore) Warriors FC |
| 22 | GK | Beatrice Tan Li Bin | 29 June 1992 (aged 24) | | | (Football Association of Singapore) H2O Dream Team |
| 25 | GK | Pamela Kong Zi En | 5 August 1991 (aged 24) | | | (Football Association of Singapore) Arion FA |
| 2 | DF | Deborah Chin Ngeet Ling | 21 April 1988 (aged 28) | | | (Football Association of Singapore) Woodlands Wellington |
| 5 | DF | Hamizah binte Abdul Talib | 2 June 1990 (aged 26) | | | (Football Association of Singapore) Police SA |
| 13 | DF | Siti Rosnani bte Azman | 22 May 1997 (aged 19) | | | (Football Association of Singapore) Police SA |
| 16 | DF | Cheryl Chan Yin Leng | 30 March 1994 (aged 22) | | | (Football Association of Singapore) Warriors FC |
| 21 | DF | Lee Lai Kuan | 30 May 1994 (aged 22) | | | (Football Association of Singapore) Warriors FC |
| 27 | DF | Nur Izyani bte Noorghani | 2 October 1987 (aged 28) | | | (Football Association of Singapore) Warriors FC |
| 29 | DF | Darvina Halini bte Deniyal | 25 May 1987 (aged 29) | | | (Football Association of Singapore) Police SA |
| 7 | MF | Lim Li Xian | 24 November 1996 (aged 19) | | | (Football Association of Singapore) Warriors FC |
| 8 | MF | Sitianiwati binte Rosielin | 26 May 1997 (aged 19) | | | (Football Association of Singapore) Warriors FC |
| 9 | MF | Chris Yip-Au Hew Seem | 5 April 1992 (aged 24) | | | (Football Association of Singapore) Arion FA |
| 11 | MF | Noor Fatin Afiqah bte Noor Aziz | 6 March 1994 (aged 22) | | | (Football Association of Singapore) Police SA |
| 12 | MF | Ho Hui Xin | 23 April 1992 (aged 24) | | | (Football Association of Singapore) Woodlands Wellington |
| 14 | MF | Suria Priya d/o Vaatharaja | 27 May 1991 (aged 25) | | | (Football Association of Singapore) H2O Dream Team |
| 15 | MF | Ernie Sulastri bte Sontaril | 24 November 1988 (aged 27) | | | (Football Association of Singapore) Police SA |
| 17 | MF | Nur Azima binte Ahmad | 1 August 1993 (aged 22) | | | (Football Association of Singapore) Warriors FC |
| 18 | MF | Joey Cheng Yu Ying | 6 November 1993 (aged 22) | | | (Football Association of Singapore) Warriors FC |
| 20 | MF | Angeline Chua | 7 November 1988 (aged 27) | | | (Football Association of Singapore) Woodlands Wellington |
| 3 | FW | Angelyn Pang Yen Ping | 13 April 1991 (aged 25) | | | (Football Association of Singapore) Woodlands Wellington |
| 10 | FW | Priscilla Tan Hui Yee | 27 December 1993 (aged 22) | | | (Football Association of Singapore) Woodlands Wellington |
| 19 | FW | Nur Azureen bte Abdul Rahman | 20 September 1991 (aged 24) | | | (Football Association of Singapore) Police SA |

=== Thailand ===
Head coach: (England) Spencer Prior

| No. | Pos. | Player | Date of birth (age) | Caps | Goals | Club |
|---|---|---|---|---|---|---|
| 1 | GK | Waraporn Boonsing | 16 February 1990 (aged 26) | 84 | 0 | (Football Association of Thailand) BG–College of Asian Scholars |
| 18 | GK | Yada Sengyong | 10 September 1993 (aged 22) | 3 | 0 | (Football Association of Thailand) North Bangkok College |
| 22 | GK | Nattaruja Muthtanawech | 21 August 1996 (aged 19) | 0 | 0 | (Football Association of Thailand) Khonkaen F.C. |
| 2 | DF | Kanjanaporn Saenkhun | 18 July 1996 (aged 20) | 1 | 0 | (Football Association of Thailand) Khonkaen F.C. |
| 3 | DF | Natthakarn Chinwong | 15 March 1992 (aged 24) | 8 | 0 | (Football Association of Thailand) BG–College of Asian Scholars |
| 4 | DF | Duangnapa Sritala (c) | 4 February 1986 (aged 30) | 22 | 2 | (Football Association of Thailand) Bangkok F.C. |
| 5 | DF | Ainon Phancha | 27 January 1992 (aged 24) | 7 | 3 | (Football Association of Thailand) Chonburi Sriprathum |
| 9 | DF | Warunee Phetwiset | 13 December 1990 (aged 25) | 41 | 0 | (Football Association of Thailand) Chonburi Sriprathum |
| 10 | DF | Sunisa Srangthaisong | 6 May 1988 (aged 28) | 24 | 2 | (Football Association of Thailand) BG–College of Asian Scholars |
| 16 | DF | Khwanruedi Saengchan | 10 September 1993 (aged 22) | 20 | 0 | (Football Association of Thailand) BG–College of Asian Scholars |
| 6 | MF | Pikul Khueanpet | 20 September 1988 (aged 27) | 41 | 0 | (Football Association of Thailand) Khonkaen F.C. |
| 7 | MF | Silawan Intamee | 22 January 1994 (aged 22) | 11 | 0 | (Football Association of Thailand) Chonburi Sriprathum |
| 8 | MF | Naphat Seesraum | 11 May 1987 (aged 29) | 83 | 20 | (Football Association of Thailand) BG–College of Asian Scholars |
| 12 | MF | Rattikan Thongsombut | 7 July 1991 (aged 25) | 18 | 3 | (Football Association of Thailand) BG–College of Asian Scholars |
| 15 | MF | Nipawan Panyosuk | 15 March 1995 (aged 21) | 0 | 0 | Unattached |
| 17 | MF | Anootsara Maijarern | 14 February 1986 (aged 30) | 80 | 21 | (Football Association of Thailand) Air Force United |
| 21 | MF | Kanjana Sungngoen | 21 September 1986 (aged 29) | 44 | 30 | (Football Association of Thailand) Bangkok F.C. |
| 11 | FW | Alisa Rukpinij | 2 February 1995 (aged 21) | 3 | 0 | (Football Association of Thailand) Chonburi Sriprathum |
| 13 | FW | Orathai Srimanee | 12 June 1988 (aged 28) | 8 | 2 | (Football Association of Thailand) Khonkaen F.C. |
| 14 | FW | Thanatta Chawong | 19 June 1989 (aged 27) | 66 | 23 | (Swedish Football Association) Östersunds DFF |
| 19 | FW | Taneekarn Dangda | 15 December 1992 (aged 23) | 16 | 9 | (Swedish Football Association) Östersunds DFF |
| 20 | FW | Pitsamai Sornsai | 19 January 1989 (aged 27) | | | Unattached |
| 23 | FW | Nisa Romyen | 18 January 1990 (aged 26) | 47 | 32 | (Football Association of Thailand) North Bangkok College |

=== Vietnam ===
Head coach: Mai Đức Chung

| No. | Pos. | Player | Date of birth (age) | Club |
|---|---|---|---|---|
| 1 | GK | Đặng Thị Kiều Trinh | 19 December 1985 (aged 30) | (Vietnam Football Federation) Sports center district 1 Ho Chi Minh city |
| 14 | GK | Lại Thị Tuyết | 27 April 1993 (aged 23) | (Vietnam Football Federation) TC&SC Hà Nam |
| 20 | GK | Khổng Thị Hằng | 10 October 1993 (aged 22) | (Vietnam Football Federation) Than KSVN |
| 2 | DF | Nguyễn Thị Xuyến | 6 September 1987 (aged 28) | (Vietnam Football Federation) TC&SC Hà Nội |
| 3 | DF | Chương Thị Kiều | 19 August 1995 (aged 20) | (Vietnam Football Federation) Sports center district 1 Ho Chi Minh city |
| 4 | DF | Vũ Thị Thúy | 8 August 1994 (aged 21) | (Vietnam Football Federation) TC&SC Hà Nam |
| 5 | DF | Bùi Thị Như | 16 June 1990 (aged 26) | |
| 6 | DF | Bùi Thúy An | 5 October 1990 (aged 25) | (Vietnam Football Federation) TC&SC Hà Nội |
| 15 | DF | Trần Thị Phương Thảo | 15 January 1993 (aged 23) | |
| 17 | DF | Nguyễn Hải Hòa | 22 December 1989 (aged 26) | (Vietnam Football Federation) Thái Nguyên |
| 21 | DF | Vũ Thị Nhung | 9 July 1992 (aged 24) | (Vietnam Football Federation) TC&SC Hà Nội |
| 22 | DF | Trần Thị Hồng Nhung | 28 October 1992 (aged 23) | (Vietnam Football Federation) TC&SC Hà Nam |
| 23 | DF | Trần Mai Tuyến | 28 February 1991 (aged 25) | |
| 7 | MF | Nguyễn Thị Tuyết Dung | 13 December 1993 (aged 22) | (Vietnam Football Federation) TC&SC Hà Nam |
| 8 | MF | Nguyễn Thị Liễu | 18 September 1992 (aged 23) | (Vietnam Football Federation) TC&SC Hà Nam |
| 9 | MF | Trần Thị Thùy Trang | 8 August 1988 (aged 27) | (Vietnam Football Federation) Sports center district 1 Ho Chi Minh city |
| 10 | MF | Nguyễn Thị Hòa | 27 July 1990 (aged 25) | (Vietnam Football Federation) TC&SC Hà Nội |
| 12 | MF | Phạm Hải Yến | 9 November 1994 (aged 21) | (Vietnam Football Federation) TC&SC Hà Nội |
| 13 | MF | Nguyễn Thị Muôn | 7 October 1988 (aged 27) | |
| 16 | MF | Nguyễn Thị Bích Thùy | 1 May 1994 (aged 22) | (Vietnam Football Federation) Sports center district 1 Ho Chi Minh city |
| 18 | MF | Nguyễn Thị Minh Nguyệt (c) | 16 November 1986 (aged 29) | (Vietnam Football Federation) TC&SC Hà Nội |
| 11 | FW | Nguyễn Thị Nguyệt | 5 November 1992 (aged 23) | |
| 19 | FW | Huỳnh Như | 28 November 1991 (aged 24) | (Vietnam Football Federation) Sports center district 1 Ho Chi Minh city |

== Group B ==
=== Australia U20 ===
Head Coach: Craig Deans

| No. | Pos. | Player | Date of birth (age) | Caps | Goals | Club |
|---|---|---|---|---|---|---|
| 1 | GK | Jada Mathyssen | 24 November 1999 (aged 16) | 1 | 0 | (Football Australia) Western Sydney Wanderers |
| 12 | GK | Hannah Southwell | 4 March 1999 (aged 17) | 2 | 0 | (Football Australia) Newcastle Jets |
| 18 | GK | Annalee Grove | 15 June 2001 (aged 15) | 0 | 0 | (Football Australia) Newcastle Jets |
| 2 | DF | Olivia Ellis | 19 March 1999 (aged 17) | 0 | 0 | (Football Australia) Melbourne City |
| 3 | DF | Brooke Miller | 4 May 1998 (aged 18) | 2 | 0 | (Football Australia) Newcastle Jets |
| 4 | DF | Clare Hunt | 12 March 1999 (aged 17) | 0 | 0 | (Football Australia) Canberra United |
| 8 | DF | Clare Wheeler | 14 January 1998 (aged 18) | 2 | 0 | (Football Australia) Newcastle Jets |
| 13 | DF | Annabel Martin | 23 October 1998 (aged 17) | 4 | 0 | (Football Australia) Melbourne Victory |
| 15 | DF | Hannah Bourke | 13 January 2000 (aged 16) | 1 | 0 | (Football Australia) Newcastle Jets |
| 17 | DF | Sophie Nenadovic | 8 April 1998 (aged 18) | 1 | 0 | (Football Australia) Newcastle Jets |
| 5 | MF | Ally Green | 17 August 1998 (aged 17) | 0 | 0 | (Football Australia) Manly United |
| 6 | MF | Hannah Bacon | 6 March 1998 (aged 18) | 1 | 0 | (Football Australia) Sydney FC |
| 10 | MF | Alex Chidiac | 15 January 1999 (aged 17) | 11 | 4 | (Football Australia) Melbourne City |
| 11 | MF | Georgia Plessas | 2 October 1998 (aged 17) | 2 | 0 | (Football Australia) Sydney FC |
| 14 | MF | Hayley Richmond | 1 February 1999 (aged 17) | 1 | 0 | (Football Australia) FFV NTC |
| 16 | MF | Ashleigh Lefevre | 27 August 1999 (aged 16) | 1 | 0 | (Football Australia) FFV NTC |
| 19 | MF | Grace Maher | 18 April 1999 (aged 17) | 1 | 1 | (Football Australia) Canberra United |
| 20 | MF | Melinda Barbieri | 16 May 2000 (aged 16) | 1 | 0 | (Football Australia) Melbourne Victory |
| 21 | MF | Eliza Ammendolia | 9 March 1999 (aged 17) | 0 | 0 | (Football Australia) Western Sydney Wanderers |
| 23 | MF | Emily Condon | 1 September 1998 (aged 17) | 5 | 4 | (Football Australia) Adelaide United |
| 7 | FW | Princess Ibini | 31 January 2000 (aged 16) | 11 | 4 | (Football Australia) Sydney FC |
| 9 | FW | Cortnee Vine | 9 April 1998 (aged 18) | 1 | 2 | (Football Australia) Brisbane Roar |
| 22 | FW | Melina Ayres | 13 April 1999 (aged 17) | 1 | 0 | (Football Australia) Melbourne City |

=== Malaysia ===
Head coach: Asyraaf Abdullah

| No. | Pos. | Player | Date of birth (age) | Club |
|---|---|---|---|---|
| 20 | GK | Asma Junaidi | 18 November 1992 (aged 23) | (Football Association of Malaysia) Sabah FA |
| 21 | GK | Roszaini Bakar | 17 October 1990 (aged 25) | (Football Association of Malaysia) Armed Forces FA |
| 23 | GK | Nurul Azurin Mazlan | 27 January 2000 (aged 16) | (Football Association of Malaysia) Sabah FA |
| 4 | DF | Shereilynn Elly Pius | 20 August 1991 (aged 24) | (Football Association of Malaysia) Sabah FA |
| 5 | DF | Nur Athirah Farhanah Zairi | 5 July 1999 (aged 17) | (Football Association of Malaysia) Sabah FA |
| 8 | DF | Eslilah Esar | 18 July 1989 (aged 27) | (Football Association of Malaysia) MISC-MIFA |
| 17 | DF | Malini Nordin | 29 December 1985 (aged 30) | (Football Association of Malaysia) Kuala Lumpur FA |
| 25 | DF | Yasrikalaura Tumas | 15 October 1996 (aged 19) | (Football Association of Malaysia) Sabah FA |
| 26 | DF | Marcella Angela Parais | 28 March 1999 (aged 17) | (Football Association of Malaysia) Sabah FA |
| 30 | DF | Rogayah Ali | 15 August 1985 (aged 30) | (Football Association of Malaysia) Sarawak FA |
| 2 | MF | Masturah Majid | 5 February 1990 (aged 26) | (Football Association of Malaysia) Sabah FA |
| 7 | MF | Jaciah Jumilis | 23 July 1991 (aged 25) | (Football Association of Malaysia) Sabah FA |
| 9 | MF | Usliza Usman | 20 May 1995 (aged 21) | (Football Association of Malaysia) Sabah FA |
| 10 | MF | Norsuriani Mazli | 27 April 1990 (aged 26) | (Football Association of Malaysia) Pahang FA |
| 14 | MF | Nurul Hamira Yusma Mohd Yusri | 26 October 1992 (aged 23) | (Football Association of Malaysia) MISC-MIFA |
| 15 | MF | Pedrolia Martin Sikayun | 18 February 1992 (aged 24) | (Football Association of Malaysia) MISC-MIFA |
| 16 | MF | Fadathul Najwa Nurfarahain Azmi | 6 November 1995 (aged 20) | (Football Association of Malaysia) Perak FA |
| 19 | MF | Dardee Rofinus | 7 January 1990 (aged 26) | (Football Association of Malaysia) MISC-MIFA |
| 22 | MF | Haindee Mosroh | 17 April 1993 (aged 23) | (Football Association of Malaysia) Sabah FA |
| 27 | MF | Keroline Raymond | 14 January 2000 (aged 16) | (Football Association of Malaysia) Sabah FA |
| 28 | MF | Ainie Tulis | 4 March 1994 (aged 22) | (Football Association of Malaysia) MISC-MIFA |
| 12 | FW | Angela Kais (c) | 7 September 1980 (aged 35) | (Football Association of Malaysia) Polis Di-Raja Malaysia |
| 13 | FW | Nur Haniza Sa'arani | 26 May 1996 (aged 20) | (Football Association of Malaysia) Perak FA |

=== Myanmar ===
Head Coach: (Netherlands) Roger Reijners

| No. | Pos. | Player | Date of birth (age) | Caps | Goals | Club |
|---|---|---|---|---|---|---|
| 1 | GK | Mya Phu Ngon | 10 August 1989 (aged 26) | | | |
| 18 | GK | Zar Zar Myint | 5 June 1993 (aged 23) | | | |
| 20 | GK | Thandar Oo | 29 September 1997 (aged 18) | | | |
| 2 | DF | Khin Than Wai | 2 November 1995 (aged 20) | | | |
| 4 | DF | Wai Wai Aung | 5 October 1993 (aged 22) | | | |
| 5 | DF | Phu Pwint Khaing | 23 July 1987 (aged 29) | | | |
| 21 | DF | Zin Mar Tun | 23 August 1995 (aged 20) | | | |
| 22 | DF | Aye Aye Moe | 4 February 1995 (aged 21) | | | |
| 6 | MF | San San Maw (c) | 5 October 1980 (aged 35) | | | |
| 8 | MF | Naw Ar Lo Wer Phaw | 11 January 1988 (aged 28) | | | |
| 10 | MF | Khin Marlar Tun | 21 May 1988 (aged 28) | | | |
| 12 | MF | Le Le Hlaing | 24 March 1997 (aged 19) | | | |
| 14 | MF | Aye Myo Myat | 14 March 1995 (aged 21) | | | |
| 16 | MF | Yuper Khine | 31 January 1996 (aged 20) | | | |
| 17 | MF | May Sabai Phoo | 31 July 1996 (aged 19) | | | |
| 19 | MF | Khin Mo Mo Tun | 3 May 1999 (aged 17) | | | |
| 7 | FW | Win Theingi Tun | 1 February 1995 (aged 21) | | | |
| 9 | FW | Yee Yee Oo | 1 August 1990 (aged 25) | | | |
| 11 | FW | Khin Moe Wai | 16 December 1989 (aged 26) | | | |
| 13 | FW | May Thu Kyaw | 10 November 1995 (aged 20) | | | |
| 15 | FW | Hla Yin Win | 20 October 1995 (aged 20) | | | |
| 23 | FW | Nilar Win | 19 March 1997 (aged 19) | | | |

=== Timor-Leste ===
Head coach: Gelasio da Silva Carvalho

| No. | Pos. | Player | Date of birth (age) | Caps | Goals | Club |
|---|---|---|---|---|---|---|
| 1 | GK | Agostinha Nogueira | 28 August 1995 (aged 20) | | | |
| 12 | GK | Nedia Helena Da Costa | 26 August 1993 (aged 22) | | | |
| 20 | GK | Esterlita da Costa Brito Mendes | 18 August 1994 (aged 21) | | | |
| 2 | DF | Godelivia Martins | 12 September 1998 (aged 17) | | | |
| 3 | DF | Trifonia Mesquita | 2 October 1996 (aged 19) | | | |
| 5 | DF | Francisca De Andrade | 20 October 1993 (aged 22) | | | |
| 12 | DF | Natacha Sarmento | 23 December 1998 (aged 17) | | | |
| 13 | DF | Eurosia Da Conceicao | 19 December 1993 (aged 22) | | | |
| 22 | DF | Maria Da Conceicao | 1 February 1997 (aged 19) | | | |
| 7 | MF | Engracia Fernandes (Captain) | 23 November 1987 (aged 28) | | | |
| 8 | MF | Luselia Fernandes | 6 May 1993 (aged 23) | | | |
| 9 | MF | Melania Martins | 23 September 1994 (aged 21) | | | |
| 23 | MF | Rosa Da Costa | 2 September 1993 (aged 22) | | | |
| 10 | FW | Inacia Dos Anjos | 18 December 1999 (aged 16) | | | |
| 11 | FW | Natalia Da Costa | 23 December 1992 (aged 23) | | | |
| 14 | FW | Luisa Marques | 23 November 1984 (aged 31) | | | |
| 15 | FW | Sonia Amaral | 2 May 1997 (aged 19) | | | |
| 16 | FW | Femania Babo | 8 May 1996 (aged 20) | | | |
| 19 | FW | Julia Freitas Belo | 8 October 1997 (aged 18) | | | |
| 24 | FW | Nilda Dos Reis | 3 April 1999 (aged 17) | | | |
| 26 | FW | Fernanda Araujo | 1 November 1990 (aged 25) | | | |
| 28 | FW | Elisabeth Pinto | 19 March 1989 (aged 27) | | | |
| 29 | FW | Bernardina Mousaco | 23 March 1992 (aged 24) | | | |
