= List of Coast to Coast Athletic Conference champions =

The Coast to Coast Athletic Conference, formerly the Capital Athletic Conference, sponsors 18 sports in which 21 (8 current) athletic programs have competed in. Up until the 2019–20 season, championships were under the branding Capital Athletic Conference (CAC), from the 2020–21 season on, championships are under the Coast to Coast Athletic Conference (C2C) branding.

== Fall sports ==
=== Men's cross country ===
==== Results ====
The inaugural season of men's cross country was in the 1991-92 school year. The table below shows the Team Champions with the total number of championships won in parentheses, the team runner-up, and the individual champion along with their team.

Season	Team champion	Team runner-up	Individual champion
1991	Mary Washington	Catholic (DC)	Chris Boelke Catholic (DC)
1992	Mary Washington (2)	Gallaudet	Murray Chesno Mary Washington
1993	Mary Washington (3)	Salisbury	Jeff Hankins Salisbury
1994	Mary Washington (4)	Salisbury	Chris Meno Goucher
1995	Mary Washington (5)	Salisbury	Jon Gates Mary Washington
1996	Mary Washington (6)	Salisbury	Jon Gates Mary Washington
1997	Salisbury	Mary Washington	Jeff Olenick Goucher
1998	Mary Washington (7)	Salisbury	Stefan Kochansky York (PA)
1999	Mary Washington (8)	Salisbury	Jeff Olenick Goucher
2000	Salisbury (2)	Mary Washington	Jeff Olenick Goucher
2001	Mary Washington (9)	Salisbury	Michael Audette Catholic (DC)
2002	Salisbury (3)	Mary Washington	Michael Audette Catholic (DC)
2003	Salisbury (4)	Mary Washington	Tristan Gilbert Salisbury
2004	Mary Washington (10)	Salisbury	Todd Kronenberg Mary Washington
2005	Salisbury (5)	Mary Washington	Scott Koehler Salisbury
2006	Salisbury (6)	Mary Washington	Frank DeVar Mary Washington
2007	Salisbury (7)	Mary Washington	Chris Barnard Salisbury
2008	Salisbury (8)	Mary Washington	Chris Barnard Salisbury
2009	Mary Washington (11)	Salisbury	Chris Barnard Salisbury
2010	Salisbury (9)	Mary Washington	Chris Barnard Salisbury
2011	York (PA)	Mary Washington	Daniel Ache Mary Washington
2012	York (PA) (2)	Mary Washington	Jeff Branson Mary Washington
2013	York (PA) (3)	Christopher Newport	Nick Eghtessad Mary Washington
2014	Salisbury (10)	Christopher Newport	Thomas Burke Salisbury
2015	Christopher Newport	York (PA)	Andrew Benfer Christopher Newport
2016	Christopher Newport (2)	York (PA)	Grant Dell York (PA)
2017	Christopher Newport (3)	York (PA)	Grant Dell York (PA)
2018	York (PA) (4)	Christopher Newport	Clark Edwards Christopher Newport
2019	York (PA) (5)	Christopher Newport	Mike Myers Southern Virginia
2020	Cancelled due to the COVID-19 pandemic		
2021	UC Santa Cruz (1)	Christopher Newport	Eric Jackson UC Santa Cruz
2022	UC Santa Cruz (2)	Christopher Newport	Eric Jackson UC Santa Cruz
2023	UC Santa Cruz (3)	Christopher Newport	Eric Jackson UC Santa Cruz
2024	UC Santa Cruz (4)	Christopher Newport	Luke Holland UC Santa Cruz
2025	UC Santa Cruz (5)	Salisbury	Luke Holland UC Santa Cruz

==== Championship records ====
Currently University of Mary Washington has the most team championships with 11, and Mary Washington and Salisbury University are tied for the most individual champions with 8 each. The table below shows the counts for the number of team championships and individual championships won per team, as well as the years that each team won the team championship.

Team	Team champions	Individual champions	Team champion years
Mary Washington	11	8	1991, 1992, 1993, 1994, 1995, 1996, 1998, 1999, 2001, 2004, 2009
Salisbury	10	8	1997, 2000, 2002, 2003, 2005, 2006, 2007, 2008, 2010, 2014
UC Santa Cruz	5	5	2021, 2022, 2023, 2024, 2025
York (PA)	5	3	2011, 2012, 2013, 2018, 2019
Christopher Newport	3	2	2015, 2016, 2017
Goucher	0	4	none
Catholic (DC)	0	3	none
Southern Virginia	0	1	none

- Frostburg State, Gallaudet, Hood, Marymount (VA), Penn State Harrisburg, St. Mary's (MD), Stevenson, and Wesley (DE) never won a team or individual men's cross country championship before departing from the conference.
- Catholic (DC), Goucher, and Southern Virginia all won individual championships but never won a team championship.
- UC Santa Cruz and Pratt have yet to win an individual or team championship.
- Members highlighted in pink are former CAC/C2C members.

=== Women's cross country ===
==== Results ====
The inaugural season of women's cross country was in the 1991-92 school year. The table below shows the Team Champions with the total number of championships won in parentheses, the team runner-up, and the individual champion along with their team.

Season	Team champion	Team runner-up	Individual champion
1991	Mary Washington	Catholic (DC)	Melissa Brown Mary Washington
1992	Mary Washington (2)	Catholic (DC)	Allison Coleman Mary Washington
1993	Mary Washington (3)	Catholic (DC)	Angela Gloukhoff Salisbury
1994	Mary Washington (4)	Salisbury	CeCe Cleary Goucher
1995	Mary Washington (5)	Salisbury	Caitlin McGurk Mary Washington
1996	Salisbury	Mary Washington	Rebecca Bell Salisbury
1997	Mary Washington (6)	Salisbury	Kerri Bowers Salisbury
1998	Mary Washington (7)	Catholic (DC)	Kerri Bowers Salisbury
1999	Mary Washington (8)	Salisbury	Suzy McCulloch Salisbury
2000	Mary Washington (9)	Salisbury	Suzy McCulloch Salisbury
2001	Mary Washington (10)	Catholic (DC)	Erin Connelly Mary Washington
2002	Mary Washington (11)	Catholic (DC)	Erin Connelly Mary Washington
2003	Mary Washington (12)	Salisbury	Rachel Yates Catholic (DC)
2004	Salisbury (2)	Mary Washington	Cristy Falcone Mary Washington
2005	Salisbury (3)	Mary Washington	Glenda Sullivan Salisbury
2006	Salisbury (4)	Mary Washington	Jenn Bulger Salisbury
2007	Mary Washington (13)	Salisbury	Cristy Falcone Mary Washington
2008	Salisbury (5)	Mary Washington	Marsha Berge Salisbury
2009	Salisbury (6)	Mary Washington	Sarah Dawes Mary Washington
2010	Salisbury (7)	Mary Washington	Jessica Daley Marymount (VA)
2011	Salisbury (8)	Mary Washington	Liz Green Mary Washington
2012	Mary Washington (14)	York (PA)	Lauren Braney Mary Washington
2013	Christopher Newport	York (PA)	Lydia Cromwell Christopher Newport
2014	Christopher Newport (2)	Mary Washington	Lauren Braney Mary Washington
2015	Christopher Newport (3)	York (PA)	Lydia Cromwell Christopher Newport
2016	York (PA)	Christopher Newport	Kathleen Cannon York (PA)
2017	York (PA) (2)	Salisbury	Sydney Bigelow Southern Virginia
2018	York (PA) (3)	Mary Washington	Alayna DeBruin York (PA)
2019	Christopher Newport (4)	York (PA)	Jill Westman Southern Virginia
2020	Cancelled due to the COVID-19 pandemic		
2021	UC Santa Cruz (1)	Christopher Newport	Logan Funk Christopher Newport
2022	UC Santa Cruz (2)	Christopher Newport	Riley Martel-Phillips UC Santa Cruz
2023	UC Santa Cruz (3)	Christopher Newport	Helena Janku UC Santa Cruz
2024	UC Santa Cruz (4)	Salisbury	Helena Janku UC Santa Cruz
2025	UC Santa Cruz (5)	Christopher Newport	Elena Stanciu UC Santa Cruz

==== Championship records ====
Currently University of Mary Washington has the most team and individual championships with 14 and 11 respectively. The table below shows the counts for the number of team championships and individual championships won per team, as well as the years that each team won the team championship.

Team	Team champion	Individual champion	Team champion years
Mary Washington	14	11	1991, 1992, 1993, 1994, 1995, 1997, 1998, 1999, 2000, 2001, 2002, 2003, 2007, 2021
Salisbury	8	9	1996, 2004, 2005, 2006, 2008, 2009, 2010, 2011
UC Santa Cruz	5	4	2021, 2022, 2023, 2024, 2025
Christopher Newport	4	3	2013, 2014, 2015, 2019
York (PA)	3	2	2016, 2017, 2018
Southern Virginia	0	2	none
Catholic (DC)	0	1	none
Goucher	0	1	none
Marymount (VA)	0	1	none

- Frostburg State, Gallaudet, Hood, Penn State Harrisburg, St. Mary's (MD), Stevenson, and Wesley (DE) never won a team or individual men's cross country championship before departing from the conference.
- Catholic (DC), Goucher, Marymount (VA), and Southern Virginia all won individual championships but never won a team championship.
- Mills, Mount Mary, UC Santa Cruz and Pratt have yet to win an individual or team championship.
- Members highlighted in pink are former CAC/C2C members.

=== Men's soccer ===
==== Results ====
The tournament has been held annually since 1991. It is a single-elimination tournament and seeding is based on regular-season records. The tournament winner receives C2C's automatic bid to the NCAA Division III Men's Soccer Championship.

Year	Champions	Score	Runner-up
1991	Mary Washington	3-0	St. Mary's (MD)
1992	Mary Washington (2)	1-0	St. Mary's (MD)
1993	Mary Washington (3)	3-0	York (PA)
1994	Mary Washington (4)	3–1^{OT}	Salisbury
1995	Mary Washington (5)	3–1^{OT}	Salisbury
1996	Mary Washington (6)	2–1	Salisbury
1997	Mary Washington (7)	2–0	Salisbury
1998	York (PA)	2–1	Salisbury
1999	Salisbury	1-0^{4OT}	Mary Washington
2000	Salisbury (2)	4-2	Mary Washington
2001	Mary Washington (8)	1–1^{4OT} ^{PK}	Salisbury
2002	Salisbury (3)	0-0^{OT} ^{PK}	Mary Washington
2003	Salisbury (4)	3-1	York (PA)
2004	Salisbury (5)	1-0	York (PA)
2005	York (PA) (2)	1–0	Salisbury
2006	York (PA) (3)	3–0	Mary Washington
2007	Salisbury (6)	2-0	York (PA)
2008	Salisbury (7)	3-0	Wesley (DE)
2009	York (PA) (4)	2–1	Stevenson
2010	York (PA) (5)	1–1^{PK}	Salisbury
2011	York (PA) (6)	1–0	Salisbury
2012	York (PA) (7)	5–0	Mary Washington
2013	York (PA) (8)	1–0	Salisbury
2014	Christopher Newport	3–1	Penn State-Harrisburg
2015	Salisbury (8)	2–0	St. Mary's (MD)
2016	Christopher Newport (2)	1–0	Mary Washington
2017	Mary Washington (9)	3-1	Christopher Newport
2018	Mary Washington (10)	1–0	St. Mary's (MD)
2019	Mary Washington (11)	1–1^{PK}	Christopher Newport
2020	Cancelled due to the COVID-19 pandemic		
2021	Christopher Newport (3)	2–1	Mary Washington
2022	Mary Washington (12)	1–1^{PK}	Christopher Newport
2023	Mary Washington (13)	3–2	Wisconsin–Platteville
2024	Mary Washington (14)	3–2^{OT}	Christopher Newport
2025	Christopher Newport (4)	1–0	Salisbury

- ^{PK} indicates that the champion was determined by penalty kicks.
- ^{OT} indicates that the champion was determined in over time.

==== Championship records ====
School	Finals record	Finals appearances	Years
Mary Washington	14-7	21	1991, 1992, 1993, 1994, 1995, 1996, 1997, 2001, 2017, 2018, 2019, 2022, 2023, 2024
Salisbury	8-11	19	1999, 2000, 2002, 2003, 2004, 2007, 2008, 2015
York (Pa)	8-3	11	1998, 2005, 2006, 2009, 2010, 2011, 2012, 2013
Christopher Newport	4-4	8	2014, 2016, 2021, 2025
St. Mary's (MD)	0-4	4	none
Wisconsin–Platteville	0-1	1	none
Penn State-Harrisburg	0-1	1	none
Stevenson	0-1	1	none
Wesley (DE)	0-1	1	none

- Catholic (DC), Finlandia, Frostburg State, Gallaudet, Goucher, Hood, Marymount (VA), Pine Manor, Pratt, Southern Virginia, and Wisconsin-Whitewater never reached the tournament finals as CAC/C2C members.
- UC Santa Cruz, JWU Charlotte, Regent, and Warren Wilson have yet to reach the tournament final.
- Schools highlighted in pink are former CAC/C2C members.

=== Women's soccer ===
==== Results ====
The tournament has been held annually since 1991. It is a single-elimination tournament and seeding is based on regular-season records. The tournament winner receives C2C's automatic bid to the NCAA Division III Women's Soccer Championship.

Year	Champions	Score	Runner-up
1991	Mary Washington	3-0	Catholic (DC)
1992	Mary Washington (2)	7-1	Catholic (DC)
1993	Mary Washington (3)	3-0	Catholic (DC)
1994	Salisbury	2-1	Mary Washington
1995	Mary Washington (4)	3–0	Salisbury
1996	Mary Washington (5)	2–0	Salisbury
1997	Mary Washington (6)	1–0^{PK}	Salisbury
1998	Mary Washington (7)	1–0^{3OT}	Salisbury
1999	Mary Washington (8)	2-1	Salisbury
2000	Salisbury (2)	2-1	Mary Washington
2001	Mary Washington (9)	2-1	Salisbury
2002	Mary Washington (10)	1-0	Salisbury
2003	Mary Washington (11)	2-1^{OT}	York (PA)
2004	Mary Washington (12)	0-0^{PK}	Salisbury
2005	Catholic (DC)	3-2	York (PA)
2006	Salisbury (3)	3–0	St. Mary's (MD)
2007	York (PA)	2-0	Salisbury
2008	St. Mary's (MD)	1-0	York (PA)
2009	Mary Washington (13)	2–2^{PK}	Stevenson
2010	Stevenson	1–0^{OT}	Frostburg State
2011	Salisbury (4)	1–0^{OT}	St. Mary's (MD)
2012	Frostburg State	0–0^{PK}	Salisbury
2013	York (PA) (2)	1–1^{PK}	Christopher Newport
2014	Frostburg State (2)	2-0	Mary Washington
2015	York (PA) (3)	1–0^{2OT}	Mary Washington
2016	Christopher Newport	1–0	Frostburg State
2017	Christopher Newport (2)	4–0	Frostburg State
2018	Christopher Newport (3)	3–1	Mary Washington
2019	Mary Washington (14)	4–0	York (PA)
2020	Cancelled due to the COVID-19 pandemic		
2021	Christopher Newport (4)	1–0	UC Santa Cruz
2022	Christopher Newport (5)	1–0	Mary Washington
2023	Christopher Newport (6)	0–0^{PK}	UC Santa Cruz
2024	UC Santa Cruz (1)	2–0	Christopher Newport
2025	Christopher Newport (7)	1–0^{OT}	UC Santa Cruz

- ^{PK} indicates that the champion was determined by penalty kicks.
- ^{OT} indicates that the champion was determined in over time.

==== Championship records ====
School	Finals record	Finals appearances	Years
Mary Washington	14-6	20	1991, 1992, 1993, 1995, 1996, 1997, 1998, 1999, 2001, 2002, 2003, 2004, 2009, 2019
Christopher Newport	7-2	9	2016, 2017, 2018, 2021, 2022, 2023, 2025
Salisbury	4-10	14	1994, 2000, 2006, 2011
York (Pa)	3-4	7	2007, 2013, 2015
Frostburg State	2-3	5	2012, 2014
UC Santa Cruz	1-3	4	2024
Catholic (DC)	1-3	4	2005
St. Mary's (MD)	1-2	3	2008
Stevenson	1-1	2	2010

- Finlandia, Gallaudet, Goucher, Hood, Marymount (VA), Mills, Mount Mary, Pratt, Southern Virginia, and Wesley (DE) never reached the tournament finals as CAC/C2C members.
- JWU Charlotte, Regent, and Warren Wilson have yet to reach the tournament final.
- Schools highlighted in pink are former CAC/C2C members.

=== Women's volleyball ===
==== Results ====
The tournament has been held annually since 1991. It is a single-elimination tournament and seeding is based on regular-season records. The tournament winner receives C2C's automatic bid to the NCAA Division III Women's Volleyball Championship.

Year	Champions	Score	Runner-up
1991	Mary Washington	3-0	York (PA)
1992	Gallaudet	—N/a	York (PA)
1993	Goucher	3-1	York (PA)
1994	Catholic (DC)	3-1	York (PA)
1995	Gallaudet (2)	3–2	Mary Washington
1996	Gallaudet (3)	—N/a	Salisbury
1997	York (PA)	3-0	Salisbury
1998	Salisbury	3-1	Marymount (VA)
1999	Gallaudet (4)	3-1	Catholic (DC)
2000	Salisbury (2)	3-1	Catholic (DC)
2001	Catholic (DC) (2)	3-0	Mary Washington
2002	Catholic (DC) (3)	3-0	Salisbury
2003	Gallaudet (5)	3-2	York (PA)
2004	Salisbury (3)	3-0	Catholic (DC)
2005	Vacated	3-1	Marymount (VA)
2006	Vacated	3-0	Marymount (VA)
2007	Salisbury (4)	3-1	St. Mary's (MD)
2008	Salisbury (5)	3-1	St. Mary's (MD)
2009	Salisbury (6)	3-0	Gallaudet
2010	Frostburg State	3-0	Mary Washington
2011	Salisbury (7)	3-0	Stevenson
2012	Salisbury (8)	3-0	Marymount (VA)
2013	Christopher Newport	3-0	Salisbury
2014	Christopher Newport (2)	3-0	Salisbury
2015	Christopher Newport (3)	3-0	Salisbury
2016	Mary Washington (2)	1–0	Christopher Newport
2017	Christopher Newport (4)	3–2	Mary Washington
2018	Christopher Newport (5)	3–2	Mary Washington
2019	Christopher Newport (6)	3–1	Mary Washington
2020	Cancelled due to the COVID-19 pandemic		
2021	Christopher Newport (7)	3–2	Salisbury
2022	Mary Washington (3)	3–1	Salisbury
2023	Salisbury (9)	3–2	Mary Washington
2024	Christopher Newport (8)	3–2	Salisbury
2025	Christopher Newport (9)	3–0	Salisbury

==== Championship records ====
School	Finals record	Finals appearances	Years
Salisbury	9-10	19	1998, 2000, 2004, 2007, 2008, 2009, 2011, 2012, 2023
Christopher Newport	9-1	10	2013, 2014, 2015, 2017, 2018, 2019, 2021, 2024, 2025
Gallaudet	5-1	6	1992, 1995, 1996, 1999, 2003, 2005*, 2006*
Catholic (DC)	3-3	6	1994, 2001, 2002
Mary Washington	3-7	10	1991, 2016, 2022
York (Pa)	1-5	6	1997
Frostburg State	1-0	1	2010
Goucher	1-0	1	1993
Marymount (VA)	0-4	4	none
St. Mary's (MD)	0-2	2	none
Stevenson	0-1	1	none

- Hood, Finlandia, Mills, Mount Mary, Penn State-Harrisburg, Pratt, Southern Virginia, and Wesley (DE) never reached the tournament finals as CAC/C2C members.
- UC Santa Cruz, JWU Charlotte, Regent, and Warren Wilson have yet to reach the tournament final.
- The 2005 and 2006 titles were originally won by Gallaudet but were later vacated due to infractions.
- Schools highlighted in pink are former CAC/C2C members.

== Winter sports ==
=== Men's basketball ===
School	Finals Record	Finals Appearances	Years
Catholic	7–4	11	1993, 1998, 2001, 2002, 2004, 2006, 2007
Christopher Newport	6–5	11	2016, 2017, 2019, 2022, 2023, 2024
St. Mary's (MD)	5–0	5	1991, 2008, 2010, 2011, 2013
York (PA)	4–4	8	2005, 2012, 2018, 2020
Goucher	4–2	6	1994, 1995, 1997, 1999
Mary Washington	3–6	11	2003, 2014, 2025
Salisbury	2–4	6	1996, 2015
Marymount	2–5	7	1992, 2000
Wesley	1–3	4	2009
Hood	0–1	1	

- Finlandia, Frostburg State, Gallaudet, Penn State–Harrisburg, Pine Manor, Pratt, Southern Virginia, and Stevenson never reached the tournament finals as either CAC or C2C members.
- UC Santa Cruz and Warren Wilson have not yet reached the C2C tournament finals.
- Schools highlighted in pink are former CAC/C2C members.

== Discontinued sports ==
=== Field hockey ===
==== Results ====
The tournament has been held annually since 1991. It is a single-elimination tournament and seeding is based on regular-season records. The tournament winner receives C2C's automatic bid to the NCAA Division III Field Hockey Championship.

Year	Champions	Score	Runner-up
1991	Mary Washington	1–0^{PS}	Catholic (DC)
1992	Mary Washington (2)	3–2^{OT}	Goucher
1993	Mary Washington (3)	1–0^{OT}	Goucher
1994	Goucher	3–0	Salisbury
1995	Salisbury	2–0	Goucher
1996	Salisbury (2)	4–0	York (PA)
1997	Salisbury (3)	3–0	Mary Washington
1998	Salisbury (4)	3–2^{2OT}	Mary Washington
1999	Salisbury (5)	4-0	Mary Washington
2000	Salisbury (6)	6–1	York (PA)
2001	Salisbury (7)	1-0^{OT}	Mary Washington
2002	Salisbury (8)	6–1	Mary Washington
2003	Salisbury (9)	3–2	Mary Washington
2004	Salisbury (10)	6–0	Mary Washington
2005	Salisbury (11)	3–1	Catholic (DC)
2006	Salisbury (12)	3–1	Catholic (DC)
2007	Salisbury (13)	5–0	St. Mary's (MD)
2008	Salisbury (14)	2–0	St. Mary's (MD)
2009	Salisbury (15)	2–1	Mary Washington
2010	Mary Washington (4)	2–0	Wesley (DE)
2011	Salisbury (16)	5–1	Wesley (DE)
2012	Mary Washington (5)	4–2	Wesley (DE)
2013	Salisbury (17)	1–0^{2OT}	Christopher Newport
2014	Salisbury (18)	2–1^{OT}	Christopher Newport
2015	Salisbury (19)	2–1^{2OT}	Mary Washington
2016	Salisbury (20)	8–0	Mary Washington
2017	Christopher Newport	2-1^{OT}	Salisbury
2018	Salisbury (21)	3–1	Christopher Newport
2019	Salisbury (22)	2–1	Christopher Newport
2020	Cancelled due to the COVID-19 pandemic		
2021	Salisbury (23)	4–1	Christopher Newport
2022	Salisbury (24)	2–0	Christopher Newport
2023	Christopher Newport (2)	2–0	Salisbury
2024	Salisbury (25)	3–2^{PS}	Christopher Newport

- ^{PS} indicates that the champion was determined by penalty strokes.
- ^{OT} indicates that the champion was determined in over time.

==== Championship records ====
School	Finals record	Finals appearances	Years
Salisbury	25-3	28	1995, 1996, 1997, 1998, 1999, 2000, 2001, 2002, 2003, 2004, 2005, 2006, 2007, 2008, 2009, 2011, 2013, 2014, 2015, 2016, 2018, 2019, 2021, 2022, 2024
Mary Washington	5-10	15	1991, 1992, 1993, 2010, 2012
Christopher Newport	2-7	9	2017, 2023
Goucher	1-3	4	1994
Catholic (DC)	0-3	3	none
Wesley (DE)	0-3	3	none
St. Mary's (MD)	0-2	2	none
York (Pa)	0-2	2	none

- Frostburg State, Hood, Southern Virginia, and Stevenson never reached the tournament finals as CAC/C2C members.
- Schools highlighted in pink are former CAC/C2C members.
