= Krystal de Ramos =

Filipino footballer

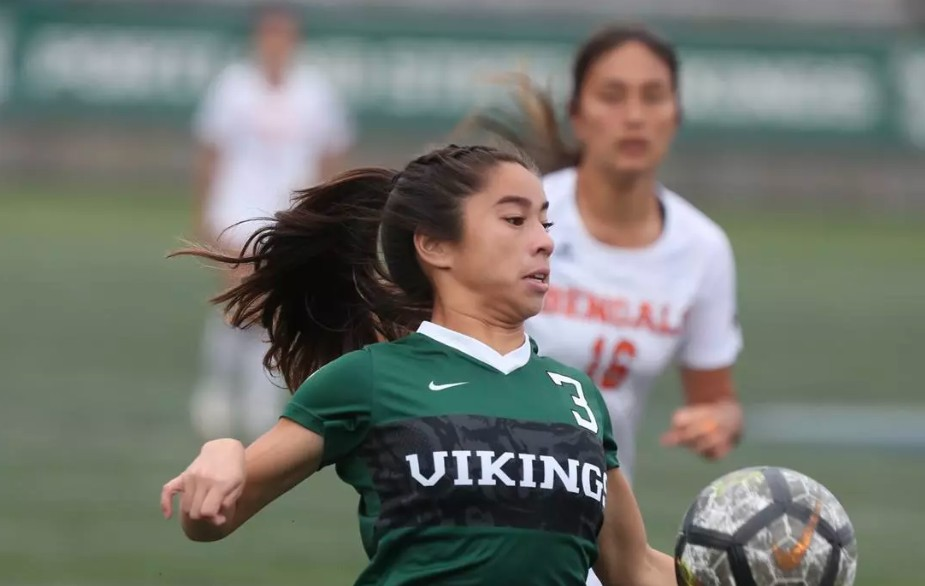
- De Ramos playing in 2018

Personal information
- Full name: Krystal Victoria Requejo de Ramos
- Date of birth: 16 March 1997 (age 29)
- Place of birth: California, United States
- Height: 5 ft 3 5/8 in (1.62 m)
- Positions: Midfielder; forward

Youth career
- 2010–2015: Los Alamitos H.S.
- 2010–2011: Downtown Las Vegas S.C
- 2011–2015: West Coast FC EGSL
- 2014–2015: West Coast FC ECNL

College career
Years	Team	Apps	(Gls)
2015–2019	Portland State Vikings	48	(8)

International career^{‡}
2016–	Philippines	3	(0)
- ‡ National team caps and goals as of July 30, 2016

Krystal Victoria Requejo de Ramos (born 16 March 1997) is a professional footballer who played as a midfielder. Born in the United States, she represented the Philippines at international level.

== Early life and education ==
De Ramos was born on March 16, 1997 to Ryan and Marian de Ramos, who are both Filipinos who emigrated to the United States. She studied at Los Alamitos High School where she was a three-year letterwinner in soccer. In 2019, she completed her bachelor's degree in mass communications at Portland State University.

== Career ==
=== High school and youth club ===
De Ramos was part of the women's soccer team of Los Alamitos High School. She helped the team win the Sunset League title in 2013 and the President's Cup in 2014. She captained her high school team from 2014 to 2015. During her senior year, she was recognized as her team's offensive MVP and named as part of the Press-Telegram Dream Team second team.

De Ramos started playing association football at the club level in 2010. She first played for Downtown Las Vegas Soccer Club. She ended her stint with the Las Vegas club in 2011 and started playing for West Coast FC EGSL within the same year until 2015. She also played for West Coast FC ECNL from 2014 to 2015.

=== College soccer ===
As a student at the Portland State University, Krystal de Ramos plays for the Portland State Vikings women's soccer team. As of April 2018, de Ramos started 34 matches with her college's soccer team and recorded 15 career points between five goals and five assists. She was given an All-Big Sky honorable mention in 2016 after tying for the team lead during the season by scoring five goals. She was named Big Sky Offensive Player of the Week on early September 2016 by netting two goals against Fresno State. Krystal de Ramos also broke the school record for shots on goal percentage during her senior year campaign.

=== International ===
During de Ramos' sophomore year in high school, she attended a summer camp organized by the Philippine Football Federation at Long Beach, California. She secured enrollment in the camp and also attended camps by the national football association during her junior and senior year in high school. In 2016 she attended camp once again and made it into the Philippines women's national football team. She made her first international cap at the 2016 AFF Women's Championship and was among the starting eleven in two of the three matches played by the national team.

In 2018, she was named part of the final 23-player roster of the Philippines which will play at the 2018 AFC Women's Asian Cup after participating in camps within the same year to secure a berth in the final squad for the continental tournament.
