= Claire Lim =

Filipino footballer

Personal information
- Full name: Claire Elisabeth de Guzman Lim
- Date of birth: October 24, 1996 (age 30)
- Place of birth: Piedmont, California, United States
- Position: Defender

College career
| Years | Team | Apps | (Gls) |
| 2018–2019 | Oxnard College | | (14) |

International career
| 2013– | Philippines | 23 | |

Claire Elisabeth de Guzman Lim (born October 24, 1996) is a footballer who plays as a defender. Born in the United States, she represents the Philippines women's national team. Shes part of the team that competed in the 2018 AFC Women's Asian Cup.

== Early life and education ==
Claire Lim was born on October 24, 1996 to Polly and Rolando Lim and has two siblings. She was born to a family into association football (soccer); her older sister Katherine would play for Boston University, and her older brother and uncle also played competitively in the sport. Lim started playing soccer when she was six years old though she also tried getting into dance and gymnastics. She graduated from Piedmont High School in California in 2014 and entered UC Santa Cruz to pursue a college degree in psychology. She both played for the soccer teams of her high school and university.

== High school career ==
Lim played for the women's team of Piedmont High School receiving four varsity letters in soccer. She was named part of the Second Team All League in 2011 and the First Team All League in 2012 and 2013.

== College career ==
Lim was captain of the women's soccer team at UC Santa Cruz. She was named AD3I Defender of the Year twice and was UCSC's Female Athlete of the Year in 2017 and 2018

== International career ==
Lim is part of the Philippine national team and is eligible to represent the country through her dual citizenship. She was introduced to the national team in 2012 by her sister Katherine who was also part of the team herself. Claire became part of the team after participating in a try-out in Corona, California, and became part of the Philippine squad for the 2013 AFF Women's Championship. She also became part of the squad that competed in the 2016 edition of the same tournament. She also helped the Philippines qualify for the 2018 AFC Women's Asian Cup featuring in all of five of the national team's qualifier matches and was part of the final lineup for the tournament proper itself.
