= Fadathul Najwa Nurfarahain Azmi =

Malaysian footballer

Personal information
- Date of birth: 6 November 1995 (age 30)
- Position: Midfielder

Senior career*
Years	Team	Apps	(Gls)
- Perak FA

International career
- Malaysia
- * Club domestic league appearances and goals

Fadathul Najwa Nurfarahain Azmi (born 6 November 1995) is a Malaysian women's international footballer who plays as a midfielder. She is a member of the Malaysia women's national football team. She was part of the team at the 2016 AFF Women's Championship. On club level she played for Perak FA in Malaysia.
