= Nurul Hamira Yusma Mohd Yusri =

Malaysian footballer

Nurul Hamira Yusma
Personal information
- Full name: Nurul Hamira Yusma binti Mohd Yusri
- Date of birth: 26 October 1992 (age 34)
- Place of birth: Malaysia
- Position: Midfielder

Senior career*
Years	Team	Apps	(Gls)
- MISC-MIFA
- Wangsa Maju City

International career
- Malaysia
- Malaysia (futsal)
- * Club domestic league appearances and goals

Nurul Hamira Yusma binti Mohd Yusri (born 26 October 1992) is a Malaysian women's international futsal player and footballer who plays as a midfielder. She is a member of the Malaysia women's national football team.

== Career ==
Hamira was part of the team at the 2016 AFF Women's Championship. On club level she played for MISC-MIFA and Wangsa Maju City in Malaysia.
