= Caitlyn Kreutz =

Filipino soccer player (born 1997)

Personal information
- Full name: Caitlyn Rose Macacando Kreutz
- Date of birth: 28 January 1997 (age 29)
- Place of birth: Mission Viejo, California, U.S.
- Height: 1.63 m (5 ft 4 in)

Youth career
- –: Buchanan H.S. (Clovis, CA)
- –: Fresno Freeze FC
- –: Central California Soccer Alliance

College career
Years	Team	Apps	(Gls)
2015–2016	Cal Poly Mustangs	38	(11)
2017–2018	UNLV Rebels	39	(12)

International career
2016–	Philippines		(0)

Caitlyn Rose Macacando Kreutz (born 28 January 1997) is a professional footballer who plays as a forward. Born in the United States, she represented the Philippines at international level.

== Early life and education ==
Caitlyn Kreutz was born January 28, 1997 in Mission Viejo, California, U.S. to Olaf and Rose Kreutz Her mother is a Filipino and was born in the Philippines.

She attended Buchanan High School in Clovis, California. For her first two years in college, she attended California Polytechnic State University and moved to the University of Nevada, Las Vegas on her junior year.

== Career ==
=== High school and youth ===
Kreutz played as a forward for Clovis' Buchanan High School. She was named Fresno Bee Player of the Year and Tri-River Athletic Conference in each of her last two seasons with Buchanan. She led her high school team to the Central Section Division 1 championships every year of her career.

She also played for the Fresno Freeze FC at the Pacific North Division of the Fresno Freeze FC helping the club finish third as well as the Central California Soccer Alliance team that won the 2015 NorCalState Club.

=== College soccer ===
Kreutz initially played for the Cal Poly Mustangs women's soccer team. In 2015, she earned the All-Big West Freshman Team honors, was named into the Virginia Nike Classic All-Tournament Team, and was voted by her teammates as Cal Poly's co-Rookie of the Year. In late-August 2016, Kreutz was named as the Big West Conference Offensive Player of the Week. In her Junior year prior, she moved to the University of Nevada, Las Vegas prior to the start of the 2017 season. She started in all 20 matches she played for the UNLV Rebels and scored five goals in her first year with UNLV.

=== International ===
Kreutz was part of the Philippines women's national football team that participated at the 2016 AFF Women's Championship. After participating in selection camps for several months, Kreutz was selected as one of the players that will compete for the Philippines at the 2018 AFC Women's Asian Cup.
