= Malini Nordin =

Malaysian footballer and futsal player

Personal information
- Full name: Malini binti Nordin
- Date of birth: 29 December 1985 (age 40)
- Place of birth: Bintangor, Sarawak, Malaysia
- Height: 1.65 m (5 ft 5 in)
- Positions: Midfielder; defender

Senior career*
Years	Team	Apps	(Gls)
- Sarawak
2015	PDRM		
2016	Kuala Lumpur		
2017	Perak		
2018	Melaka United	9	(2)
2019	Kedah	8	(3)
2021–2022	Negeri Sembilan	5	(1)
2023	PJKita		
2024	MBPJ		
2024	Melaka	7	(3)
2025	Galaxi Girls PJ		

International career
2007–2021	Malaysia	67	(2)
- * Club domestic league appearances and goals

Malini Nordin (born 29 December 1985) is a Malaysian women's footballer who plays as a midfielder and a futsal player.

== Career ==
Malini played for various club in Malaysia throughout his career. In 2021, she captained the Negeri Sembilan Women's team and won the inaugural FAS Women's Super League. She played 3 times in the final of Piala Tun Sharifah Rodziah but never won the trophy.

== International career ==
Malini made her debut with Malaysia in 2007. She is the first Malaysian women's footballer to reach a half-century of caps and the first to play over 60 international matches with the Malaysia women's football team. She represented Malaysia at 2007, 2009, 2013, 2017 and 2019 Southeast Asian Games and the AFF Women's Championship and AFC Women's Asian Cup qualification in 2007 and 2021.

== International goals ==
Scores and results list Malaysia's goal tally first.

No.	Date	Venue	Opponent	Score	Result	Competition
1.	31 July 2016	Mandalarthiri Stadium, Mandalay	Timor-Leste	5–0	13–0	2016 AFF Women's Championship
2.	31 July 2016	Mandalarthiri Stadium, Mandalay	Timor-Leste	8–0	13–0	2016 AFF Women's Championship
