= Shelby Salvacion =

Filipino footballer

Personal information
- Full name: Shelby Serhee Salvacion
- Date of birth: 6 February 1992 (age 34)
- Position: Forward

College career
| Years | Team | Apps | (Gls) |
| 2011–2015 | Sacramento State | 27 | (20) |

International career
| 2013– | Philippines | | |

Shelby Serhee Salvacion (born 6 February 1992) is a Filipino former international footballer who played for the Philippines women's national soccer team and collegiate soccer for five years at Sacramento State University. She graduated with a Bachelor of Science degree.

== High school career ==
Salvacion attended Branham High School in San Jose, California where she played on the school's soccer team for four years and was a member of the track and field team as a senior. The Mercury News named her to the Second Team All-County. She was named MVP of the Blossom Valley Athletic League, after scoring 12 goals with eight assists. For her first two seasons, she was part of an all-league selection, and in her junior year, she received First Team all-BVAL honors. She also played club soccer for MVLA Storm and won the 2008 and 2009 Pleasanton Rage Tournament with the club.

== College career ==
Salvacion played forward for the Sacramento State Hornets, the women's soccer team of California State University, Sacramento, from 2011 to 2015, although she was a redshirt during her freshman year in 2010.

== International career ==
Salvacion joined the Philippine national team in late 2012 after participating in a training camp in Southern California organized by then head coach Ernie Nierras.

She was part of the squad that participated in the 2014 AFC Women's Asian Cup qualifiers in Bangladesh. She also received a call up to the Philippine national team for 2013 Southeast Asian Games and for the 2013 AFF Women's Championship. She was called up again for the same tournament's 2016 edition.
