= UC Santa Cruz Banana Slugs =

Intercollegiate sports teams of University of California, Santa Cruz

- University: University of California, Santa Cruz
- Conference: Coast to Coast / American Southwest (women's golf only)
- NCAA: Division III
- Athletic director: Courtnie Prather (Interim)
- Location: Santa Cruz, California
- Varsity teams: 15
- Basketball arena: Kaiser Permanente Arena
- Mascot: Sammy the Slug
- Fight song: Banana Slugs Racing Down the Field
- Colors: Navy blue and gold
- Website: goslugs.com
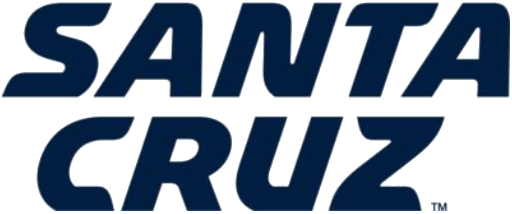

The UC Santa Cruz Banana Slugs are the athletic teams that represent the University of California, Santa Cruz. The Banana Slugs compete in Division III of the NCAA, mostly in the Coast to Coast Athletic Conference (C2C). There are fifteen varsity sports – men's and women's basketball, tennis, soccer, volleyball, swimming and diving, cross country, track & field, and women's golf. UCSC teams have been Division III nationally ranked in tennis, soccer, cross country, men's volleyball, and swimming. UCSC maintains a number of successful club sides.

UC Santa Cruz joined the NCAA in September 1980 after years of playing in unofficial club competition. In 2016, due to mounting debt in the funding of the athletic program, the university polled its students on whether or not they would approve an increase in student fees which would be necessary to maintain the athletic program. There was a significant doubt that the students would approve this increase. Contrary to predictions, a majority of the students approved a significant addition to their annual fees to maintain the existence of the athletic program.

== Varsity sports ==
Men's sports	Women's sports
Basketball	Basketball
Cross country	Cross country
Soccer	Golf
Swimming and diving	Soccer
Tennis	Swimming and diving
Track and field^{†}	Tennis
Volleyball	Track and field^{†}
	Volleyball
† – Track and field includes both indoor and outdoor.

UCSC participates in NCAA Division III men's and women's basketball, cross country, golf, soccer, swimming & diving, tennis, track & field, and volleyball. In the past, it has also participated in water polo.

=== Basketball ===
Until 1972, there was a loosely structured club basketball team with no coach; they played the local junior colleges and bible colleges. A more formal team (with a student coach) was fielded in 1972–73. They finished 22–6. Since 2013, both men's and women's basketball teams have played downtown at the Kaiser Permanente Arena.

=== Cross Country ===
The Women’s Cross Country team has finished as high as 3rd at the NCAA West Regional Championship in 2022, with 4th place finishes in 2021 and 2023. The best finish by the Men’s Cross Country team at Regionals was second in 2017, with 3rd place finishes in 2018, 2019, 2021 and 2022.

=== Soccer ===
The Banana Slugs were national runners-up in men's soccer in 2004. Team members included future MLS players Adam Smarte and Stephen Wondolowski.

Women's soccer has made NCAA Tournament appearances twelve times, most recently in 2019. Alumnae include Claire Lim, a full international for The Philippines.

=== Tennis ===
By defeating Emory to win the 2007 NCAA Championship in men's tennis, UCSC won their sixth Division III team championship. UCSC won their seventh championship in 2009 beating Amherst College in the finals to tie Kalamazoo for the most team titles in NCAA Division III.

=== Track & Field ===
UCSC added a woman's track & field varsity program in 2012. In 2016, it added a men's varsity program as well. In 2017, the Slugs track & field team competed in all event groups, for both men and women, for the first time.

=== Volleyball ===
In 2012, the Men's Volleyball Team made a Division III NCAA Semifinal appearance in the inaugural NCAA Tournament. In 2013, Men's Volleyball qualified for a second Division III Tournament. After a four-year absence, the Slugs returned to the NCAA Tournament in 2019 and were national runners-up.

The Women's volleyball team has made three appearances in the NCAA tournament: 2013, 2015 and 2022. Both teams started playing at Kaiser Permanente Arena in 2018.

=== Water Polo ===
In the 2006 season, the men's water polo team won the Division III championship, as well as an overall NCAA ranking of 19th in the nation. However, both the men and women's water polo teams went to club status in 2008 due to budget constraints.

== Club sports ==
In addition to its NCAA sports, UCSC maintains a number of successful club sides including its women's rugby NCAA Division team, which won the Division II National Collegiate Championship during its 2005 season and has competed at nationals several times since, most recently in 2010 and 2013. UCSC ultimate frisbee has a distinguished history, winning the men's collegiate national championship in 1991 and the women's national collegiate championship in 1994 and 1995. Many other club teams exist such as soccer, lacrosse, baseball, rugby, softball, and fencing.

== Intramural athletics ==
Although UCSC never had a track, the residential colleges regularly competed in an improvised "Slug Run" every spring from 1967 to 1982, though the Run now is a community event and fundraiser event hosted by the cross-country club for much needed fund to pay for entry fees, hotel, and transportation to race.

Approximately 25% of the student population participates in intramural athletics, which tend to be better funded than the intercollegiate athletic programs.

== Championships ==
=== Appearances ===
The UC Santa Cruz Banana Slugs have competed in the NCAA Championships across 14 active sports (7 men's and 7 women's) a combined 121 times at the Division III level.

- Women's basketball (2): 2016, 2017
- Men's cross country (3): 2017, 2019, 2022
- Women's cross country (2): 2022, 2023
- Women's golf (1): 2007
- Men's soccer (8): 2000, 2001, 2003, 2004, 2005, 2006, 2007, 2009
- Women's soccer (12): 1999, 2000, 2002, 2006, 2007, 2008, 2009, 2011, 2015, 2016, 2017, 2019
- Men's swimming and diving (18): 1991, 1993, 1994, 1995, 1996, 1997, 1998, 1999, 2000, 2001, 2002, 2003, 2006, 2007, 2008, 2009, 2010, 2017
- Women's swimming and diving (16): 1989, 1993, 1995, 1996, 1997, 1998, 1999, 2000, 2001, 2002, 2003, 2004, 2005, 2006, 2007, 2008, 2024
- Men's tennis (34): 1983, 1984, 1987, 1988, 1989, 1990, 1991, 1992, 1993, 1994, 1995, 1996, 1997, 1998, 1999, 2000, 2001, 2002, 2003, 2004, 2005, 2006, 2007, 2008, 2009, 2010, 2011, 2012, 2013, 2014, 2015, 2016, 2018, 2023
- Women's tennis (10): 1994, 2002, 2005, 2006, 2007, 2008, 2012, 2013, 2014, 2016
- Men's Track and Field- Indoor (2): 2023, 2024
- Men's Track and Field- Outdoor (2): 2021, 2023
- Women's Track and Field- Indoor (1): 2022
- Women's Track and Field- Outdoor (2): 2019, 2021
- Men's volleyball (5): 2012, 2013, 2015, 2019, 2023
- Women's volleyball (3): 2013, 2015, 2022

=== Team Championships ===
The Banana Slugs of UC Santa Cruz earned 7 NCAA team championships at the Division III level.

- Men's (7)
  - Tennis (7): 1989, 1995, 1996, 1998, 2005, 2007, 2009

Results

School year	Sport	Opponent	Score
1988–89	Men's tennis	Swarthmore	5–4
1994–95	Men's tennis	Washington College	4–1
1995–96	Men's tennis	Emory	4–2
1997–98	Men's tennis	Williams	4–2
2004–05	Men's tennis	Middlebury	4–1
2006–07	Men's tennis	Emory	5–1
2008–09	Men's tennis	Amherst	5–0

Below are nine national club team championships:

- Women's rugby – Division II (1): 2006 (USA Rugby)
- Co-ed sailing (1): 1976 (ICSA)
- Men's tennis – Division III (3): 2001, 2007, 2010 (ITA)
- Men's ultimate (1): 1991 (USA Ultimate)
- Women's ultimate (2): 1994, 1995 (USA Ultimate)
- Women's Water Polo – Division III (1): 2022 (Collegiate Water Polo Association)

Note: Those with no denoted division is assumed that the institution earned a national championship at the highest level.

=== Individual ===
UC Santa Cruz had 18 Banana Slugs win NCAA individual championships at the Division III level.

NCAA individual championships
Order	School year	Athlete(s)	Sport	Source
1	1993–94	Jonathan Harper; Ron Ward	Men's tennis	
2	1995–96	Matthew Humphreys	Men's swimming and diving	
3	1995–96	Jonathan Harper; Josh Vining	Men's tennis	
4	1997–98	Brian Cummings; Thomas Oechel	Men's tennis	
5	1998–99	Thomas Oechel	Men's tennis	
6	1998–99	Brian Cummings; Thomas Oechel	Men's tennis	
7	1999–00	Peter Gladkin; Thomas Oechel	Men's tennis	
8	2000–01	Derek Fitzpatrick	Men's tennis	
9	2000–01	Nick Cunningham; Derek Fitzpatrick	Men's tennis	
10	2001–02	Ben Weston	Men's swimming and diving	
11	2002–03	Mollie Lewis	Women's swimming and diving	
12	2003–04	Matt Seeberger	Men's tennis	
13	2004–05	Matt Seeberger	Men's tennis	
14	2004–05	Matt Brunner; Matt Seeberger	Men's tennis	
15	2005–06	Matt Seeberger; Shane Templeman	Men's tennis	
16	2006–07	Matt Seeberger	Men's tennis	
17	2006–07	Max Ortiz; Matt Seeberger	Men's tennis	
18	2009–10	Brian Pybas; Marc Vartabedian	Men's tennis	

== Mascot ==
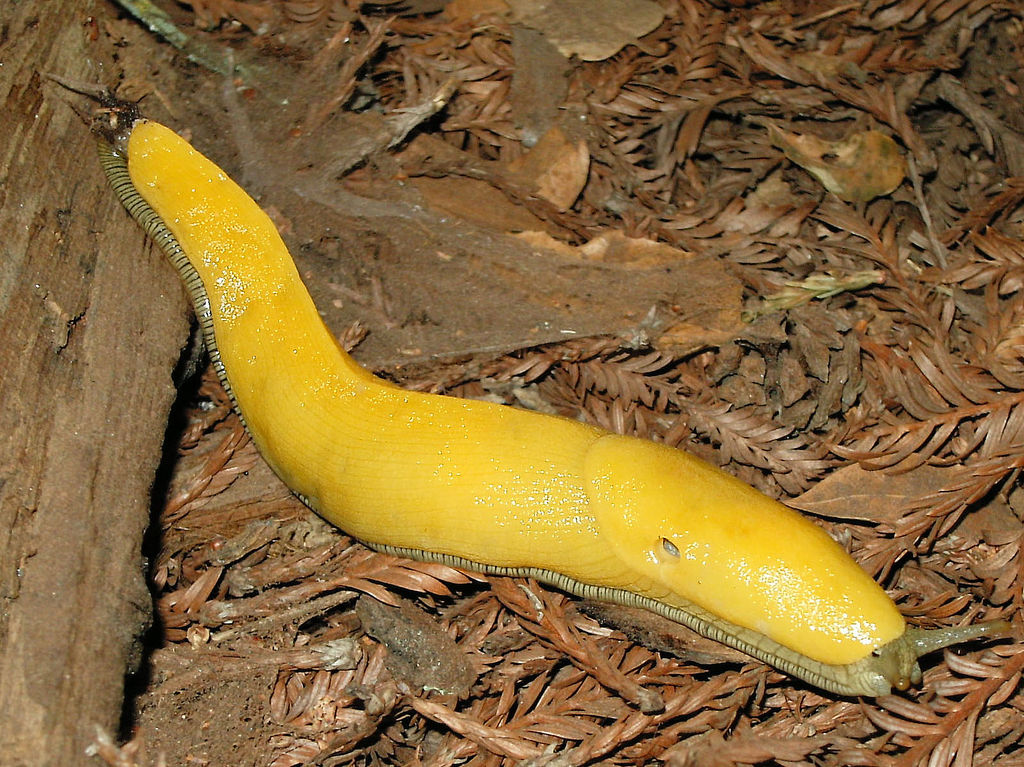
Banana slug (Ariolimax dolichophallus) at UCSC

UCSC's mascot is the banana slug (specifically, Ariolimax dolichophallus). In 1970, volleyball team member David Van Cleve created the mascot "Banana Slugs" for the UCSC volleyball team. He was concerned that, as sports began to gain in popularity at the institution, a team name or mascot did not exist. His roommate, Bob Grindeslug (no relation), silk-screened uniform shirts for the entire volleyball team in preparation for the All-Cal tournament that year. After their graduation in 1972, the team name was no longer used until 1974, when the UCSC club soccer team reinvigorated the Banana Slug mascot. Three soccer team members, Larry DeGhetaldi, Fred Bicknell, Sven Steinmo and their roommate, Richard Hedges, chose to name the team the Banana Slugs before an All-Cal tournament. The team's unusual name was noted by the San Jose Mercury News after the team suffered a humiliating defeat against the San Jose State Spartans.

In the Fall of 1972, when the club basketball team became formalized (with a coach and expanded schedule), the athletic director at the time, Terry Warner, informed the team that they needed to have a mascot and that it had been chosen to be the Sea Lions. The team summarily rejected that name, claiming to not need any mascot. Consequently, their uniforms simply said "UCSC" on them and there was no recognized mascot. In 1980, when the university began more formally participating in NCAA intercollegiate sports, the then-chancellor and some student athletes declared the mascot to be the sea lions. Most students disliked the new mascot and offered an alternative mascot, the banana slug. In 1986, students voted via referendum to declare the banana slug the official mascot of UCSC – a vote the chancellor refused to honor, arguing that only athletes should choose the mascot. When a poll of athletes showed that they, too, wanted to be Slugs, the chancellor relented.

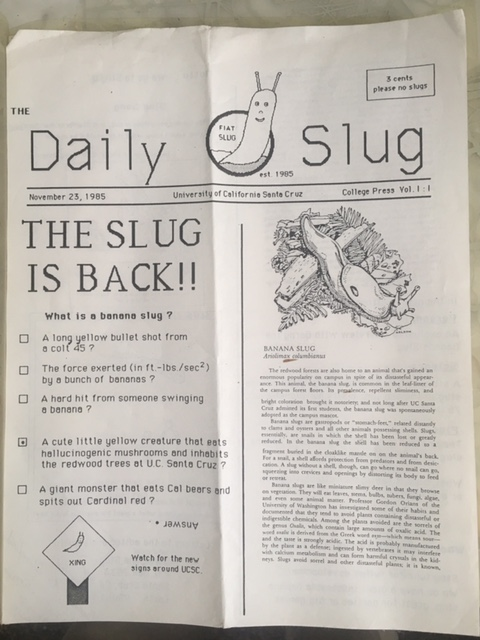
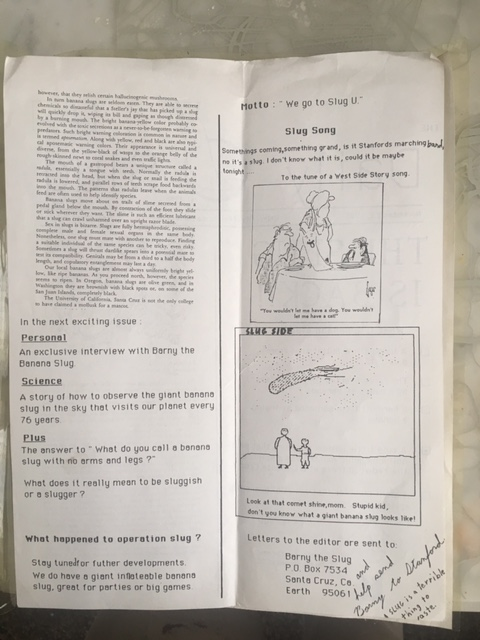
The Daily Slug, a publication that accompanied a November 1985 publicity stunt in which UC Santa Cruz students flew a 40-ft helium-filled banana slug into the Berkeley–Stanford football "Big Game" at Berkeley

The June 16, 1986, issue of People magazine featured a full-page spread dedicated to the selection of the Banana Slug as the official mascot of UCSC. In February 2008, ESPN Sports Travel named the UCSC Banana Slugs as one of the ten best nicknames in college basketball.

The "Fiat Slug" logo prominently featured on campus is a trademark of UCSC owned by the Regents. It was developed by students, artist Marc Ratner, with input by Pete Blackshaw, and Bob Byington in 1986, who later incorporated as "Oxford West" and licensed their design from the Regents to produce clothing inspired by the university. The slug also is featured along with the school's logo on Vincent Vega's T-shirt in the 1994 film Pulp Fiction.

After extensive discussion with the university community, the official logo was re-designed in 2020. The new logo still features Sammy the Slug, but re-drawn to be a "sleek and immediately recognizable design that is meant to evoke the department’s core values: inclusivity, ambition, and progressive values."

== 2016 referendum ==
By 2016 the athletic program had been operating at a deficit for many years, with its most recent expanding rising to $2 million per year even though its budget had remained at $1.4 million. Even so UCSC had the lowest operating budget in the NCAA Division III league. With few exceptions, most Banana Slugs teams had consistently very low attendance at their matches. At the same time the university was undergoing budget cuts that required a proportionate decrease in operating costs. Because of apparent lack of student support for college athletics, it was decided that it would be reasonable to channel the funds to other areas. UC Santa Cruz Provost Allison Galloway stated that under the current circumstances the university had to decide whether to keep funding the athletic program or to be able to maintain student services for an increasing student population.

The administration saw that the only available option to maintain the athletic program was to significantly increase the student athletic funding tuition fee from $5 per quarter to $90 per quarter, which would total to $270 for the academic year. In comparison, UC Berkeley fee totaled to $110 per year, UC San Diego fee was $268, and UC Davis fee was $150. Both UC Berkeley and UC Davis were NCAA Division I programs and while UC San Diego was not D-I but D-II its spending budget was $9 million, more than 6 times UCSC's. UCSC's increase of the fee to $270 would only raise the budget to $2 million. An online poll was scheduled for the end of May, where students would be asked if they were willing to approve the increase. Due to opposition to the proposal by the university's athletes and coaches as well as alumni, it was considered to be very unlikely that such a significant increase would pass. On May 24, 2016, it was announced that a record 43% of undergraduates participated in the referendum with 63% approving the significant fee increase in concept. The measure did not actually create the new fee, however, but instead tested the support that students would have for a potential fee. The actual referendum to create the new fee waited a year, until 2017.

== 2017 referendum ==
In May 2017, students approved Measure 68, the Intercollegiate Athletics and Athletics Activities Access Fee, a new fee of $38.50 per student per quarter. The measure is expected to provide athletics with $1.5 million per year. 39.23% of the student body cast votes, and 79.84% of votes were in favor of the new fee. The fee expires in Spring 2042.
