= Mandalar Thiri Stadium =

Multi-use stadium in Mandalay, Myanmar

- မန္တလာသီရိ အားကစားကွင်း
- Sea Games Stadium
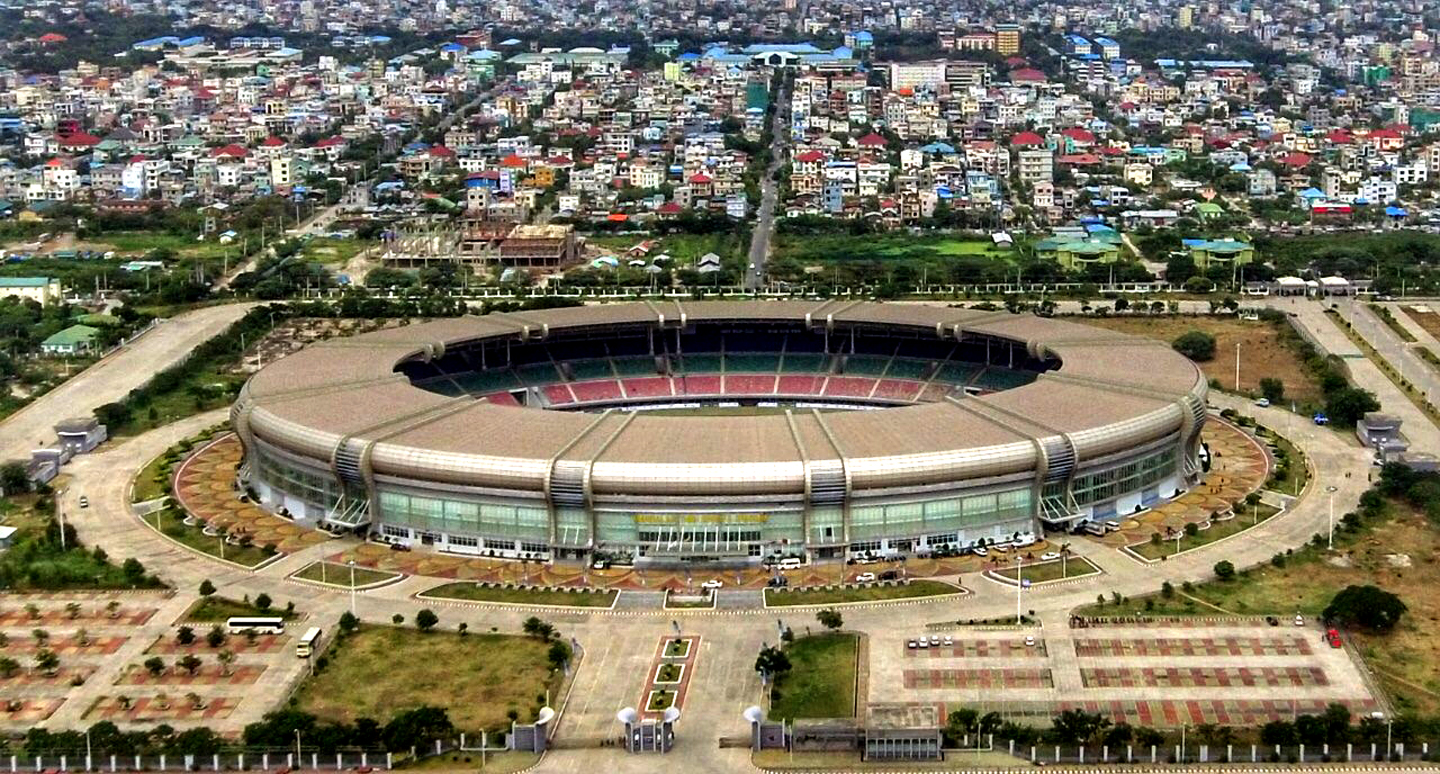
- Interactive map of Mandalar Thiri Stadium
- Location: Mandalay, Myanmar
- Coordinates: 21°56′36.8″N 96°5′55.5″E
- Owner: Ministry of Sports and Youth Affairs
- Operator: Yadanarbon FC
- Capacity: 31,270
- Surface: Grass
- Field size: Football field and Building area: 491,824.59 ft^{2} (45,692 m^{2}) each; Parking area: 403,646.64 ft^{2} (37500 m^{2}) each
- Public transit: Cycle carry, Bus Station

Construction
- Groundbreaking: January 2011
- Opened: November 2013

Tenants
- Myanmar women's national football team Yadanarbon FC; Myanmar national football team I.S.P.E F.C.

Mandalar Thiri Stadium (Burmese: မန္တလာသီရိ အားကစားကွင်း) is a multi-use stadium located in Mandalay, Myanmar. It located east of the Mingalar Mandalay. Its address is between 68th and 73rd, between 102A rd and 107 rd, beside of the Mandalay Football Academy. The stadium hosted the women's football tournament in the 2013 Southeast Asian Games and is also the home of Yadanarbon F.C. It has become one of the landmarks of Mandalay, Myanmar.

== Facilities ==
=== Mandalar Thiri Indoor Stadium ===
The Mandalar Thiri Stadium complex is also home of an indoor stadium where many local and international Lethwei events are hosted. The World Lethwei Championship hosted many events at this venue.

== Gallery ==
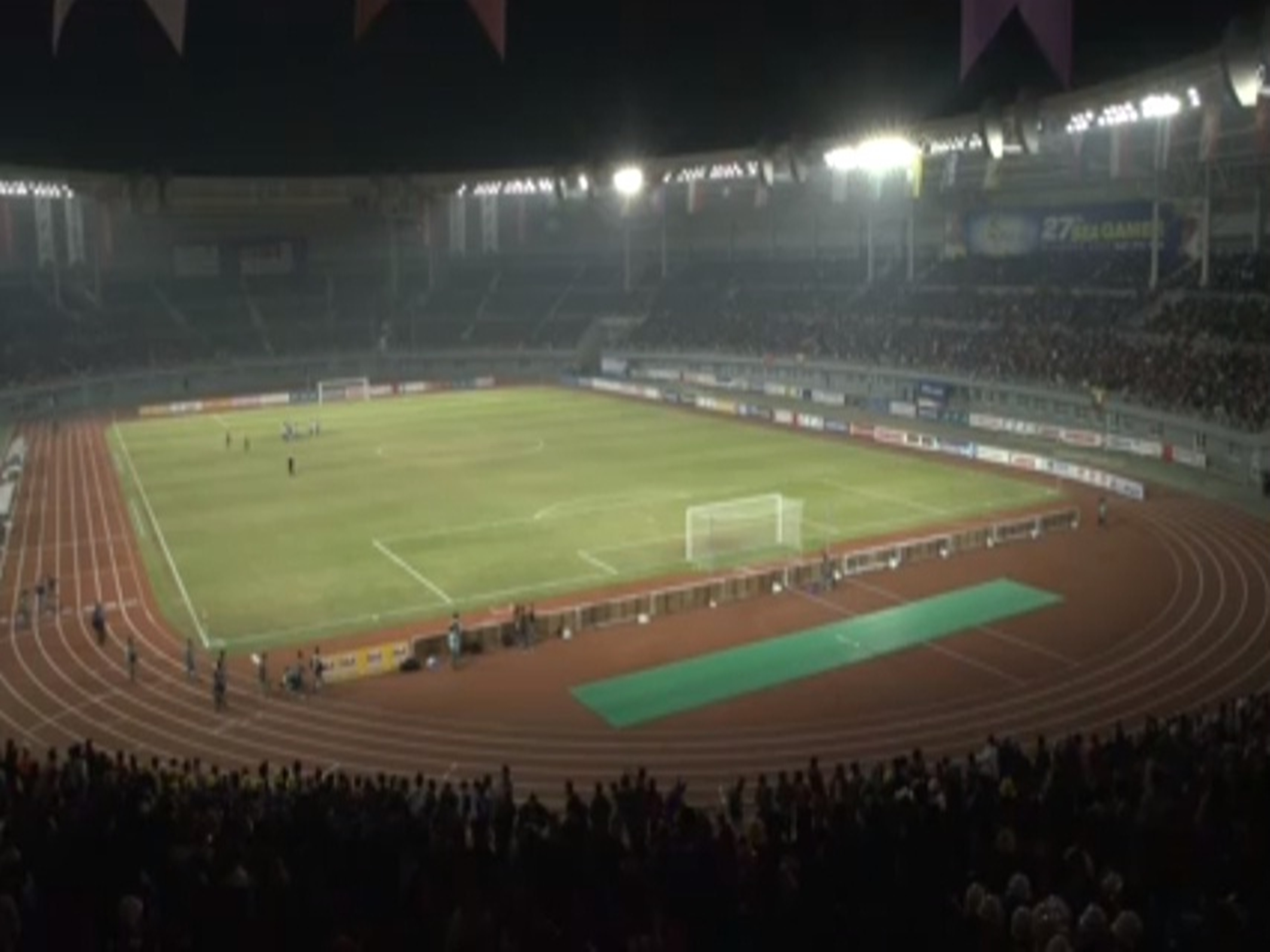
Mandalarthiti Stadium during 27th SEA Games

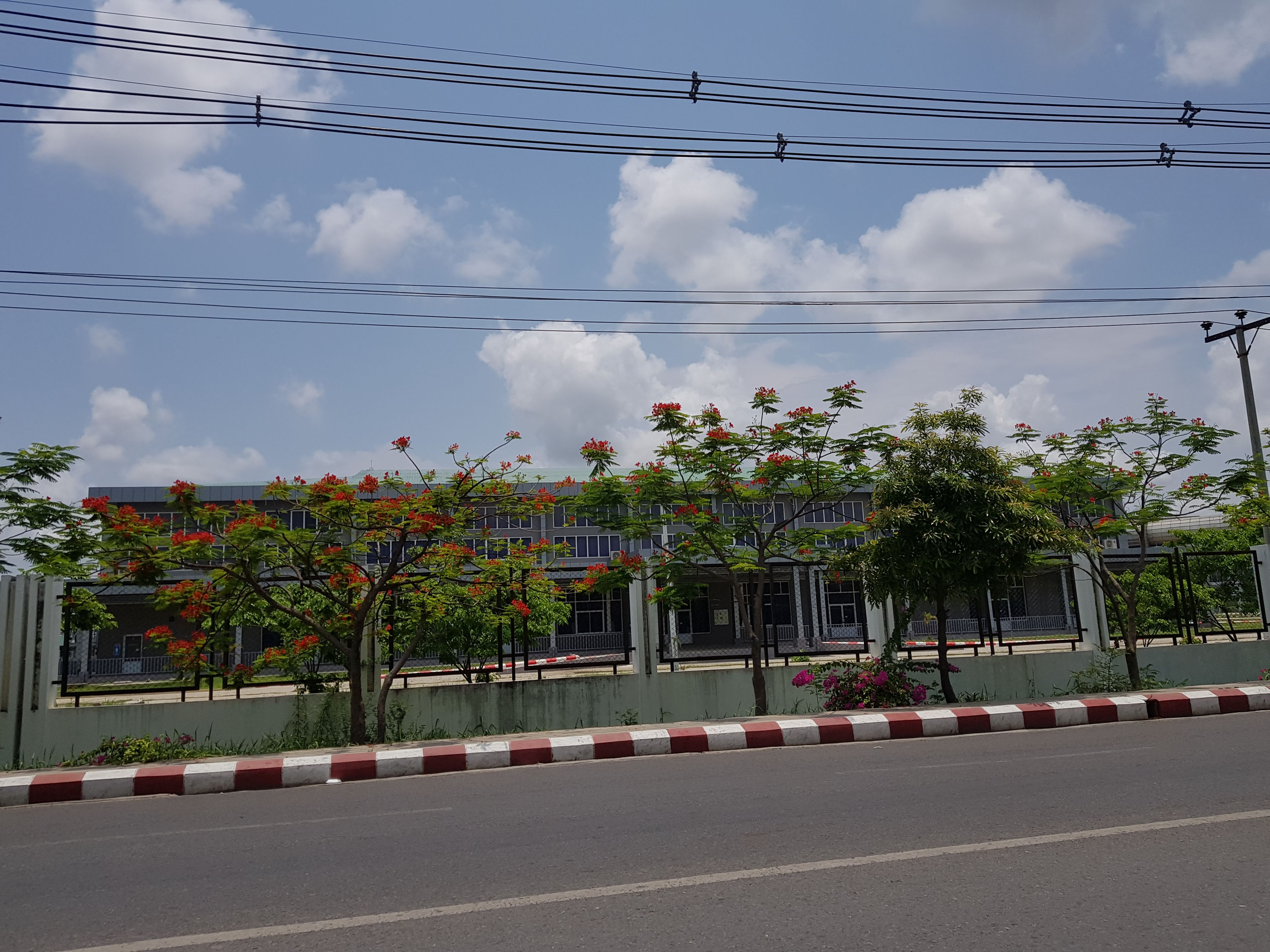
Multipurpose Indoor Stadium

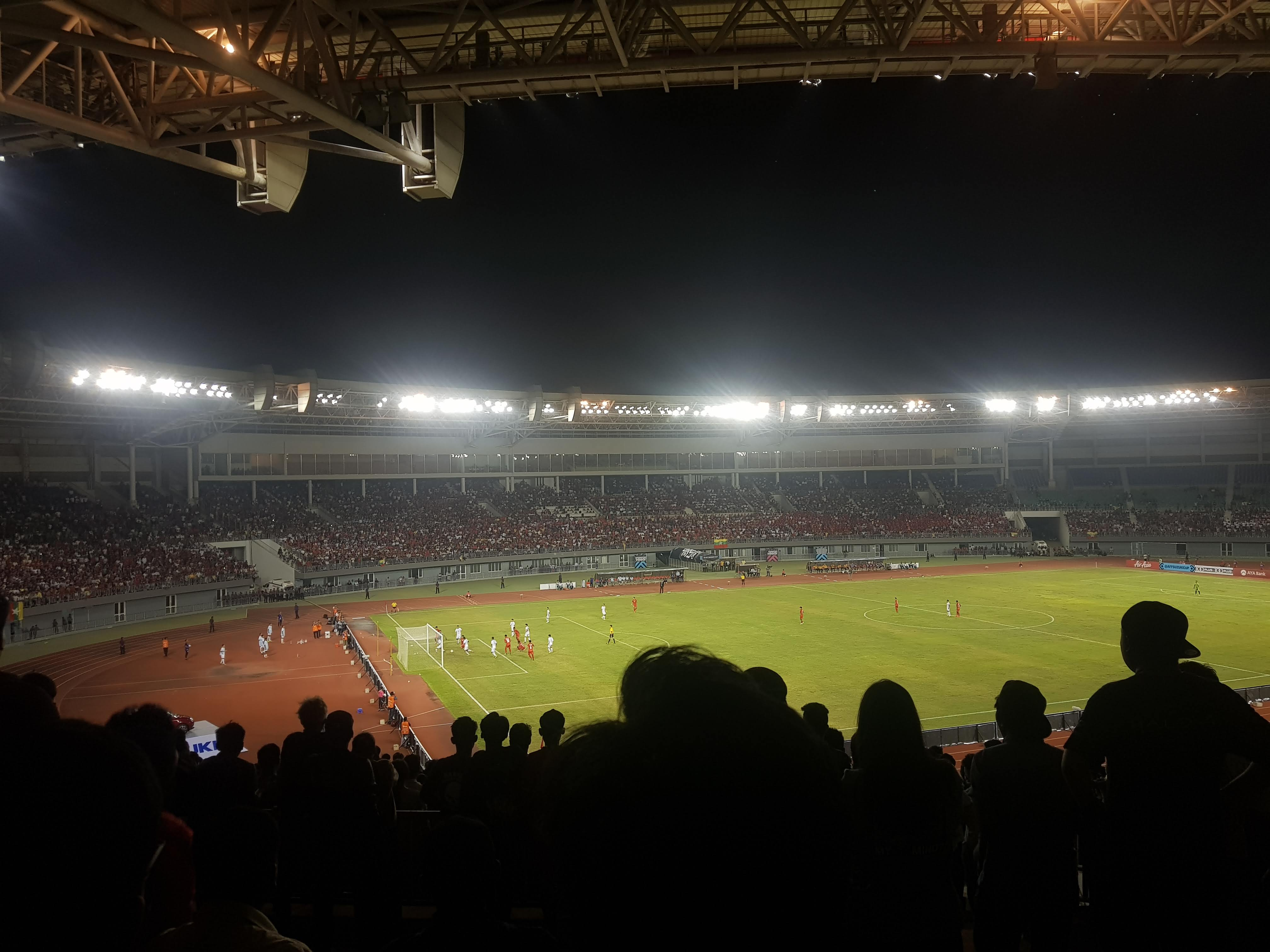
match of 2018 Suzuki Cup

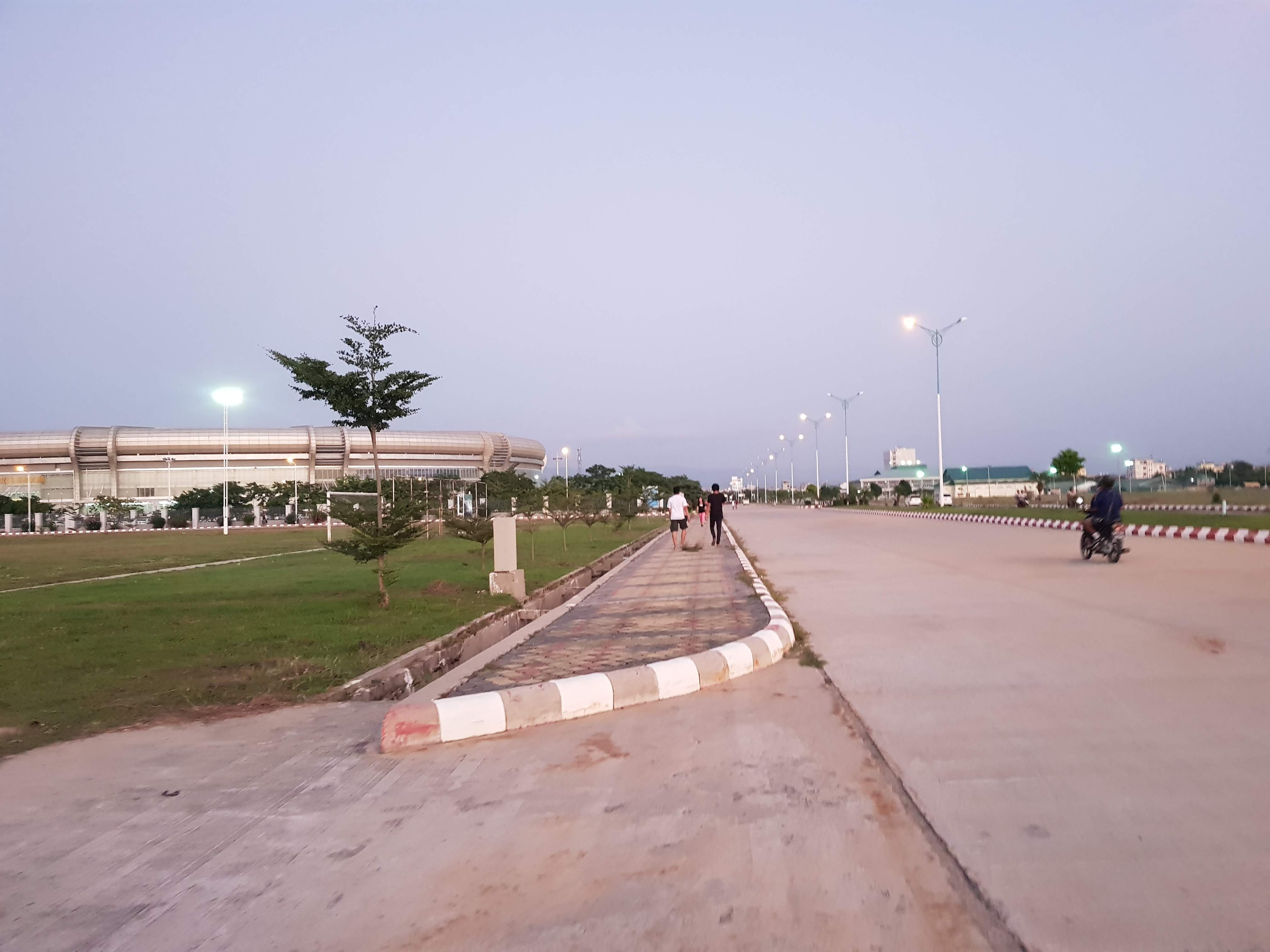
Inside the Sports Complex

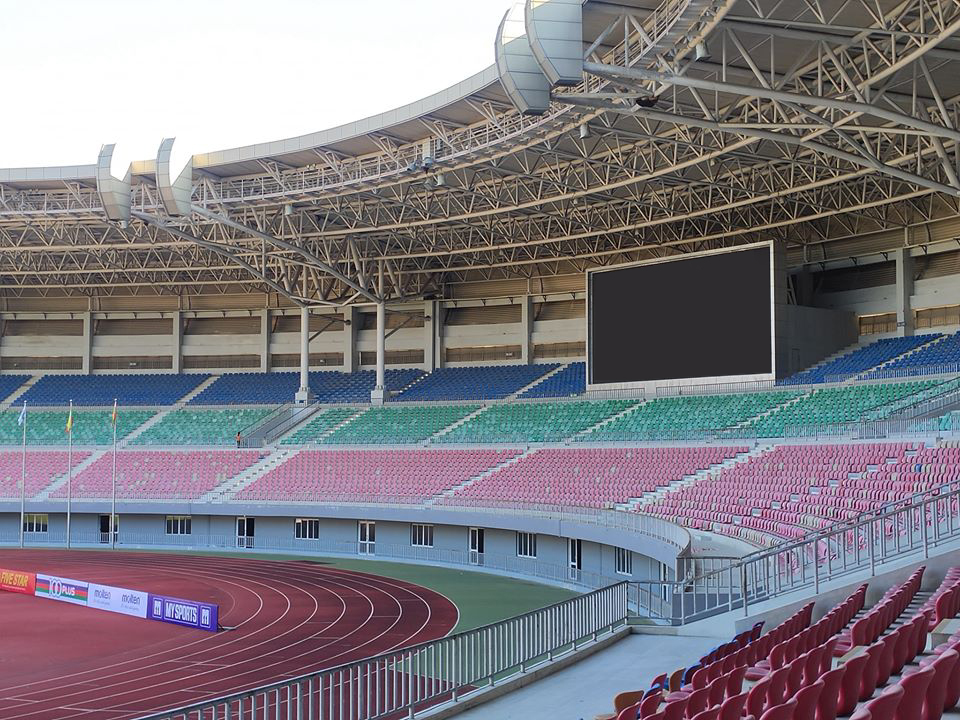
Score Board

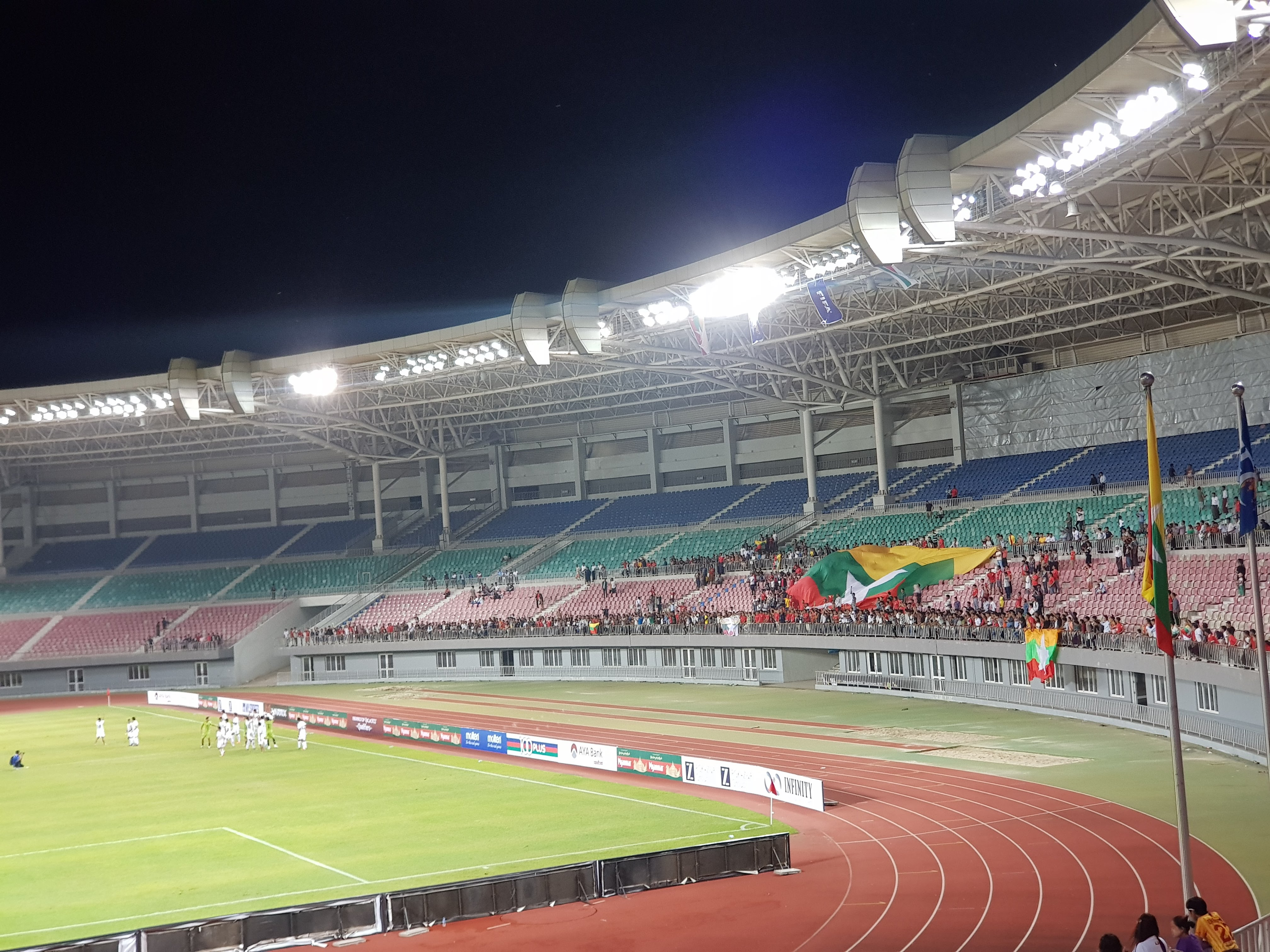

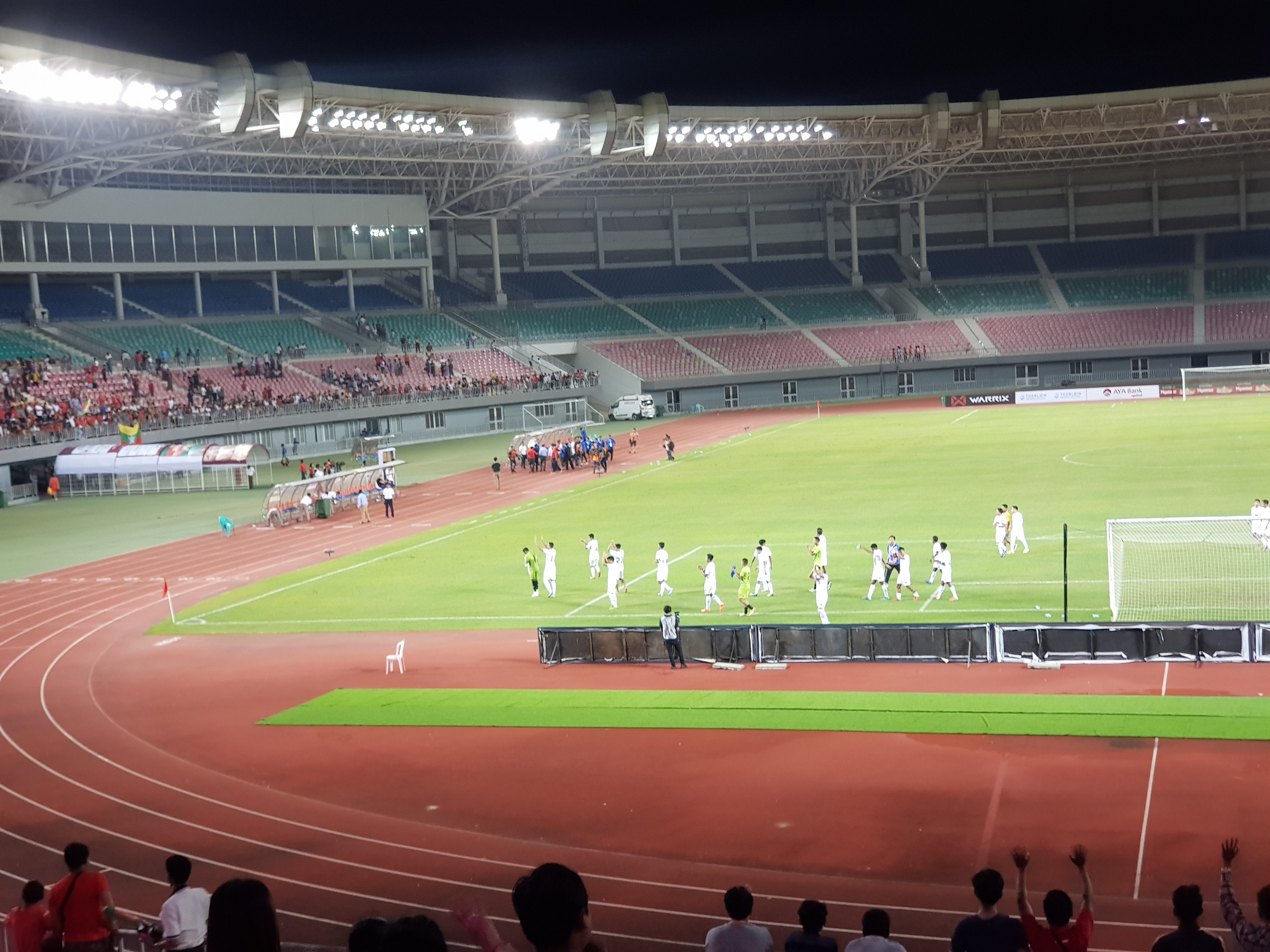

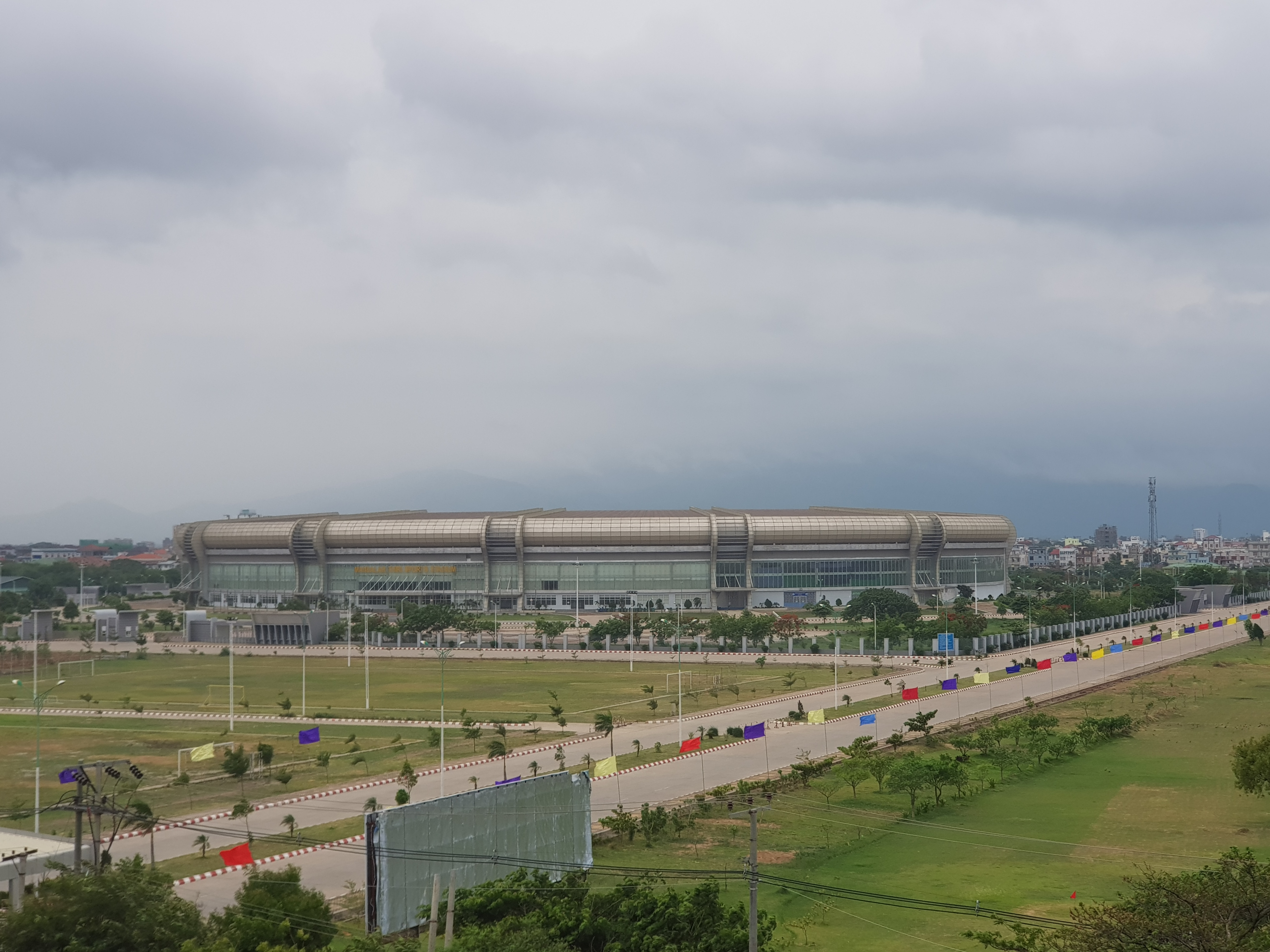
Main Stadium

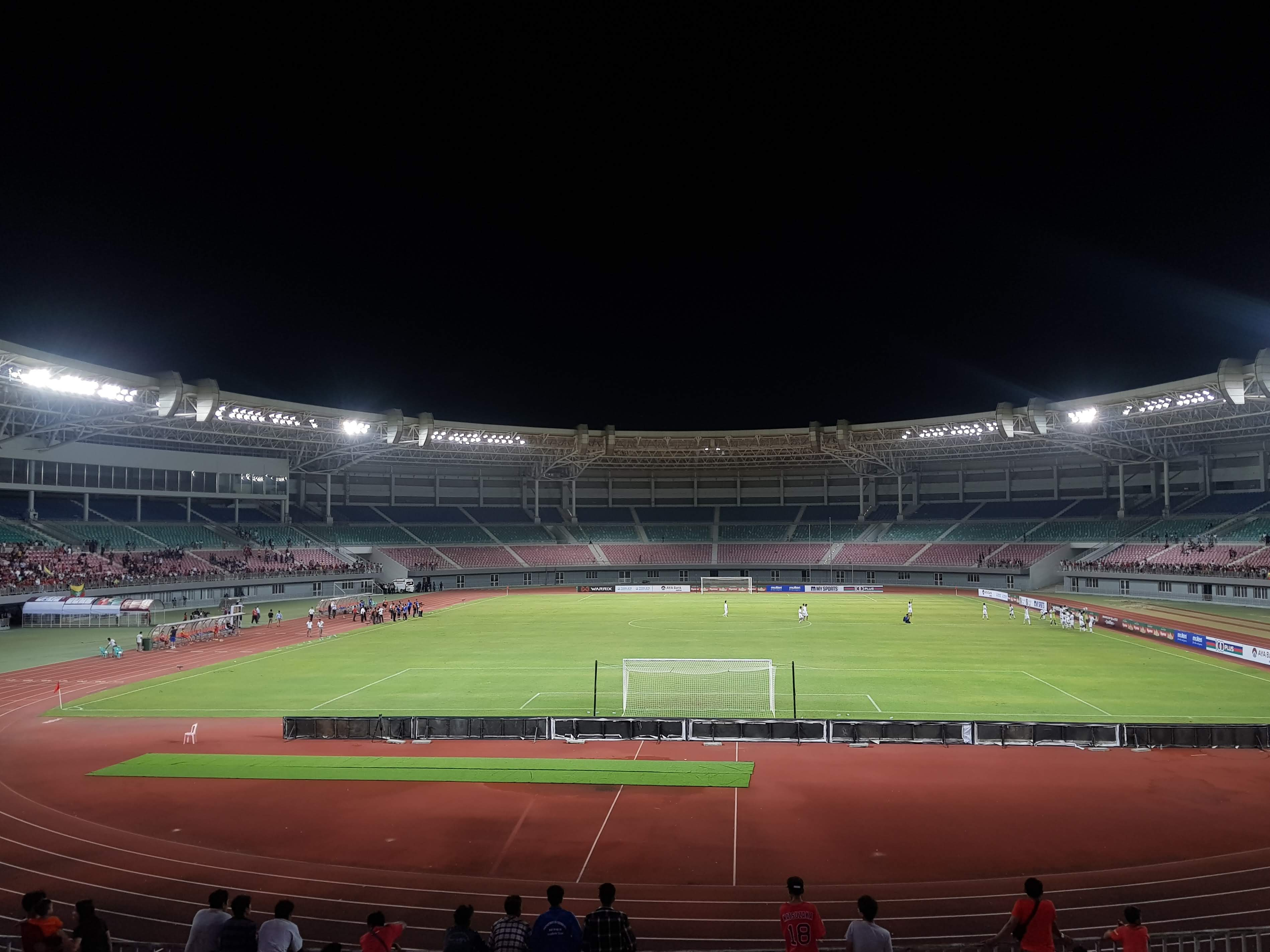
Stadium at night

== International fixtures ==
Date	Competition	Team #1	Score	Team #2	Attendance
5 October 2017	Friendly	Myanmar	1–3	Thailand	15,000
12 November 2018	2018 AFF Championship	Myanmar	4–1	Cambodia	26,946
19 March 2019	Friendly	Myanmar	0–0	Chinese Taipei	
25 March 2029	Friendly	Myanmar	0–2	Indonesia	
7 November 2019	Friendly	Myanmar	3–0	Nepal	
