= 2016 AFF Women's Championship =

Tournament details
- Host country: Myanmar
- City: Mandalay
- Dates: 26 July – 4 August
- Teams: 8 (from 1 sub-confederation)
- Venue: 1 (in 1 host city)

Final positions
- Champions: Thailand (3rd title)
- Runners-up: Vietnam
- Third place: Myanmar
- Fourth place: Australia U20

Tournament statistics
- Matches played: 16
- Goals scored: 105 (6.56 per match)
- Top scorer: (Myanmar) Win Theingi Tun (9 goals)

The 2016 AFF Women's Championship was the ninth edition of the AFF Women's Championship, an international women's football tournament organised by the ASEAN Football Federation (AFF). The tournament was held in Mandalay, Myanmar between 26 July to 4 August 2016.

The defending champions Thailand successfully defended their title after beating Vietnam in the final via penalty shoot-out.

== Participating teams ==
8 teams were set to take part in the tournament in Mandalay, Myanmar. Indonesia was suspended by FIFA at the time the group was announced. Australia sent its under-20 team. Japan, Chinese Taipei and South Korea were invited to participate as the eighth team in the tournament. However, none of the three confirmed their participation and Timor Leste was named as the tournament's eighth team.

- Australia U20
- Myanmar (Hosts)
- Malaysia
- Philippines
- Singapore
- Thailand (Holders)
- Vietnam
- Timor-Leste

== Group stage ==
The top two teams of each group advanced to the semi-finals.

Tiebreakers

The teams are ranked according to points (3 points for a win, 1 point for a draw, 0 points for a loss). If tied on points, tiebreakers are applied in the following order:

1. Goal difference in all the group matches;
2. Greater number of goals scored in all the group matches;
3. Result of the direct match between the teams concerned;
4. Kicks from the penalty mark if the teams concerned are still on the field of play.
5. Lowest score using Fair Play Criteria;
6. Drawing of lots.

All times listed are Myanmar Standard Time (UTC+06:30)

=== Group A ===
Pos	Team	Pld	W	D	L	GF	GA	GD	Pts	Qualification
1	Vietnam	3	3	0	0	20	0	+20	9	Knockout stage
2	Thailand	3	2	0	1	12	2	+10	6	Knockout stage
3	Philippines	3	1	0	2	2	8	−6	3	
4	Singapore	3	0	0	3	0	24	−24	0	

Source: AFF
Rules for classification: Group stage tiebreakers
26 July 2016
15:00

Thailand	4–0	Philippines
Pitsamai 21', 31'; Kanjana 51'; Rattikan 68'	Report

Mandalarthiri Stadium, Mandalay
Referee: Oh Hyeon-jeong (South Korea)
26 July 2016
18:00

Vietnam	14–0	Singapore
Nguyễn Thị Xuyến 4'; Nguyễn Thị Liễu 8', 80'; Nguyễn Thị Muôn 10', 45+1', 47', 53', 59', 61'; Nguyễn Thị Tuyết Dung 17', 50'; Nguyễn Thị Minh Nguyệt 25'; Nur Izyani 36' (o.g.); Phạm Hải Yến 67'	Report

Mandalarthiri Stadium, Mandalay
Referee: Law Bik Chi (Hong Kong)

28 July 2016
15:00

Philippines	0–4	Vietnam
	Report	Nguyễn Thị Hòa 7'; Nguyễn Thị Tuyết Dung 30', 71'; Nguyễn Thị Minh Nguyệt 80'

Mandalarthiri Stadium, Mandalay
Referee: Thein Thein Aye (Myanmar)
28 July 2016
18:00

Singapore	0–8	Thailand
	Report	Anootsara 27', 85', 88'; Alisa 30'; Thanatta 58'; Orathai 70'; Taneekarn 74'; Nisa 74'

Mandalarthiri Stadium, Mandalay
Referee: Seinn Cho Aung (Myanmar)

30 July 2016
15:00

Philippines	2–0	Singapore
De los Reyes 5'; Wilson 50'	Report

Mandalarthiri Stadium, Mandalay
Referee: Lee Yi-chi (Chinese Taipei)
30 July 2016
18:00

Thailand	0–2	Vietnam
	Report	Huỳnh Như 85'; Nguyễn Thị Nguyệt 90+4'

Mandalarthiri Stadium, Mandalay
Referee: Oh Hyeon-jeong (South Korea)

=== Group B ===
Pos	Team	Pld	W	D	L	GF	GA	GD	Pts	Qualification
1	Australia U20	3	2	1	0	25	1	+24	7	Knockout stage
2	Myanmar (H)	3	2	1	0	20	2	+18	7	Knockout stage
3	Malaysia	3	1	0	2	14	6	+8	3	
4	Timor-Leste	3	0	0	3	0	50	−50	0	

Source: AFF
Rules for classification: Group stage tiebreakers
(H) Hosts
27 July 2016
15:00

Australia U20	4–0	Malaysia
Vine 13', 43'; Maher 88'; Chidiac 89'	Report

Mandalarthiri Stadium, Mandalay
Referee: Bùi Thị Thu Trang (Vietnam)
27 July 2016
18:00

Myanmar	17–0	Timor-Leste
Win Theingi Tun 3', 13', 19', 45+1', 75'; Khin Marlar Tun 7', 33'; Yee Yee Oo 21', 29', 39'; May Thu Kyaw 22', 54', 59'; Khin Mo Mo Tun 31'; Hlayin Win 65'; Wai Wai Aung 71', 90+2'	Report

Mandalarthiri Stadium, Mandalay
Referee: Lee Yi-chi (Chinese Taipei)

29 July 2016
15:00

Timor-Leste	0–20	Australia U20
	Report	Barbieri 2', 10', 24'; Nenadovic 9'; Condon 16', 40', 55'; Wheeler 23'; Ellis 34', 51'; Ammendolia 37', 42', 50'; Ayres 45', 45+1', 59'; Lefevre 65'; Green 53', 87', 90+1'

Mandalarthiri Stadium, Mandalay
Referee: Công Thị Dung (Vietnam)
29 July 2016
18:00

Malaysia	1–2	Myanmar
Dadree 18'	Report	Khin Moe Wai 45+2' (pen.); Win Theingi Tun 78'

Mandalarthiri Stadium, Mandalay
Attendance: 15,000
Referee: Pannipar Kamnueng (Thailand)

31 July 2016
15:00

Timor-Leste	0–13	Malaysia
	Report	Natacha 4' (o.g.); Shereilynn 8', 12', 76', 82', 85'; Haniza 17', 32', 35', 89'; Malini 27', 45'; Luisa 68' (o.g.)

Mandalarthiri Stadium, Mandalay
Referee: Pannipar Kamnueng (Thailand)
31 July 2016
18:00

Myanmar	1–1	Australia U20
Khin Moe Wai 41'	Report	Plessas 78'

Mandalarthiri Stadium, Mandalay
Attendance: 22,500
Referee: Law Bik Chi (Hong Kong)

== Knockout stage ==
Semi-finals
2 August 2016 – Mandalay
Vietnam (p)	3 (5)
Myanmar	3 (4)
2 August 2016 – Mandalay
Australia U20	1
Thailand	2

Final
4 August 2016 – Mandalay
Vietnam	1 (5)
Thailand (p)	1 (6)
Third place
4 August 2016 – Mandalay
Myanmar	1
Australia U20	0

=== Semi-finals ===
2 August 2016
15:00

Australia U20	1–2	Thailand
Maher 11'	Report	Kanjana 30'; Anootsara 39' (pen.)

Mandalarthiri Stadium, Mandalay
Referee: Law Bik Chi (Hong Kong)
2 August 2016
18:00

Vietnam	3–3 (a.e.t.)	Myanmar
Huỳnh Như 15'; Nguyễn Thị Tuyết Dung 17'; Nguyễn Thị Minh Nguyệt 90+4' (pen.)	Report	Win Theingi Tun 59', 90+1' (pen.); May Thu Kyaw 76'
Penalties
Chương Thị Kiều (penalty scored); Nguyễn Thị Minh Nguyệt (penalty scored); Nguyễn Thị Tuyết Dung (penalty scored); Nguyễn Thị Xuyến (penalty scored); Nguyễn Thị Bích Thùy (penalty scored)	5–4	(penalty scored) Win Theingi Tun; (penalty scored) Le Le Hlaing; (penalty missed) Khin Marlar Tun; (penalty scored) Khin Than Wai; (penalty scored) Khin Moe Wai

Mandalarthiri Stadium, Mandalay
Attendance: 31,000
Referee: Oh Hyeon-jeong (South Korea)

=== Third place match ===
4 August 2016
15:00

Myanmar	1–0	Australia U20
Win Theingi Tun 20'	Report

Mandalarthiri Stadium, Mandalay
Attendance: 1,500
Referee: Law Bik Chi (Hong Kong)

=== Final ===
4 August 2016
18:00

Vietnam	1–1 (a.e.t.)	Thailand
Nguyễn Thị Minh Nguyệt 85'	Report	Rattikan 7'
Penalties
Nguyễn Thị Minh Nguyệt (penalty missed); Nguyễn Thị Tuyết Dung (penalty scored); Nguyễn Thị Muôn (penalty missed); Nguyễn Thị Xuyến (penalty scored); Chương Thị Kiều (penalty scored); Nguyễn Thị Liễu (penalty missed); Vũ Thị Nhung (penalty scored); Bùi Thúy An (penalty scored); Trần Thị Phương Thảo (penalty missed)	5–6	(penalty scored) Anootsara; (penalty missed) Sunisa; (penalty scored) Kanjana; (penalty missed) Naphat; (penalty scored) Nipawan; (penalty missed) Rattikan; (penalty scored) Pikul; (penalty scored) Duangnapa; (penalty scored) Natthakarn

Mandalarthiri Stadium, Mandalay
Referee: Thein Thein Aye (Myanmar)

== Awards ==
2016 AFF Women's Championship Champions
(Thailand)
Thailand
Third title

== Controversy ==
In the 6th round of the penalty shoot-out of the final between Vietnam and Thailand, Thailand's Rattikan Thongsombut shot out while Vietnam's Nguyễn Thị Liễu effort hit goalkeeper Waraporn Boonsing and rolled its way past the goal line before being shot away by the goalkeeper. Myanmar referee Thein Thein Aye first recognised for a goal but reversed her decision after discussing with two lineswomen, Singapore's Mohd Nasir and Merlo Albano from the Philippines stated the ball had not entirely crossed the goal line. Vietnamese media calls the event as a "stolen championship".

== Goalscorers ==
9 goals

- (Myanmar) Win Theingi Tun

6 goals

- (Vietnam) Nguyễn Thị Muôn

5 goals

- (Malaysia) Shereilynn Elly Pius
- (Vietnam) Nguyễn Thị Tuyết Dung

4 goals

- (Malaysia) Nur Haniza Sa'arani
- (Myanmar) May Thu Kyaw
- (Thailand) Anootsara Maijarern
- (Vietnam) Nguyễn Thị Minh Nguyệt

3 goals

- (Australia) Eliza Ammendolia
- (Australia) Melina Ayres
- (Australia) Melinda Barbieri
- (Australia) Emily Condon
- (Australia) Ally Green
- (Myanmar) Yee Yee Oo

2 goals

- (Australia) Olivia Ellis
- (Australia) Grace Maher
- (Australia) Cortnee Vine
- (Malaysia) Malini Nordin
- (Myanmar) Khin Marlar Tun
- (Myanmar) Khin Moe Wai
- (Myanmar) Wai Wai Aung
- (Thailand) Kanjana Sungngoen
- (Thailand) Pitsamai Sornsai
- (Thailand) Rattikan Thongsombut
- (Vietnam) Huỳnh Như
- (Vietnam) Nguyễn Thị Liễu

1 goal

- (Australia) Alex Chidiac
- (Australia) Ashleigh Lefevre
- (Australia) Sophie Nenadovic
- (Australia) Georgia Plessas
- (Australia) Clare Wheeler
- (Malaysia) Dadree Rofinus
- (Myanmar) Hlayin Win
- (Myanmar) Khin Mo Mo Tun
- (Philippines) Christina de los Reyes
- (Philippines) Camille Wilson
- (Thailand) Alisa Rukpinij
- (Thailand) Nisa Romyen
- (Thailand) Orathai Srimanee
- (Thailand) Taneekarn Dangda
- (Thailand) Thanatta Chawong
- (Vietnam) Nguyễn Thị Hòa
- (Vietnam) Nguyễn Thị Nguyệt
- (Vietnam) Nguyễn Thị Xuyến
- (Vietnam) Phạm Hải Yến

1 own goal

- (Singapore) Nur Izyani Noorghani (against Vietnam)
- (Timor-Leste) Luisa Marques (against Malaysia)
- (Timor-Leste) Natacha Sarmento (against Malaysia)

== Final ranking ==
Pos	Team	Pld	W	D	L	GF	GA	GD	Pts	Final result
1	Thailand	5	3	1	1	15	4	+11	10	Champions
2	Vietnam	5	3	2	0	24	4	+20	11	Runners-up
3	Myanmar (H)	5	3	2	0	24	5	+19	11	Third place
4	Australia U20	5	2	1	2	26	4	+22	7	Fourth place
5	Malaysia	3	1	0	2	14	6	+8	3	Eliminated in group stage
6	Philippines	3	1	0	2	2	8	−6	3	Eliminated in group stage
7	Singapore	3	0	0	3	0	24	−24	0	Eliminated in group stage
8	Timor-Leste	3	0	0	3	0	50	−50	0	Eliminated in group stage

(H) Hosts
