= Alexandra Eala career statistics =

Alexandra Eala tennis career statistics

Career finals
Discipline	Type	Won	Lost	Total
Singles	Grand Slam	–	–	0
Singles	WTA Finals	–	–	0
Singles	WTA 1000	–	–	0
Singles	WTA 500	1	0	1
Singles	WTA 250	0	2	2
Singles	Olympics	–	–	0
Singles	Total	1	2	3
Doubles	Grand Slam	–	–	0
Doubles	WTA Finals	–	–	0
Doubles	WTA 1000	–	–	0
Doubles	WTA 500	–	–	0
Doubles	WTA 250	–	–	0
Doubles	Olympics	–	–	0
Doubles	Total	0	0	0

This is a list of career statistics of Filipino tennis player Alexandra Eala. Eala has won one WTA Tour singles title.

Representing the Philippines, Eala has won nine medals at multi-sport events: a gold in women's singles at the SEA Games and eight bronze, five at the SEA Games and three at the Asian Games.

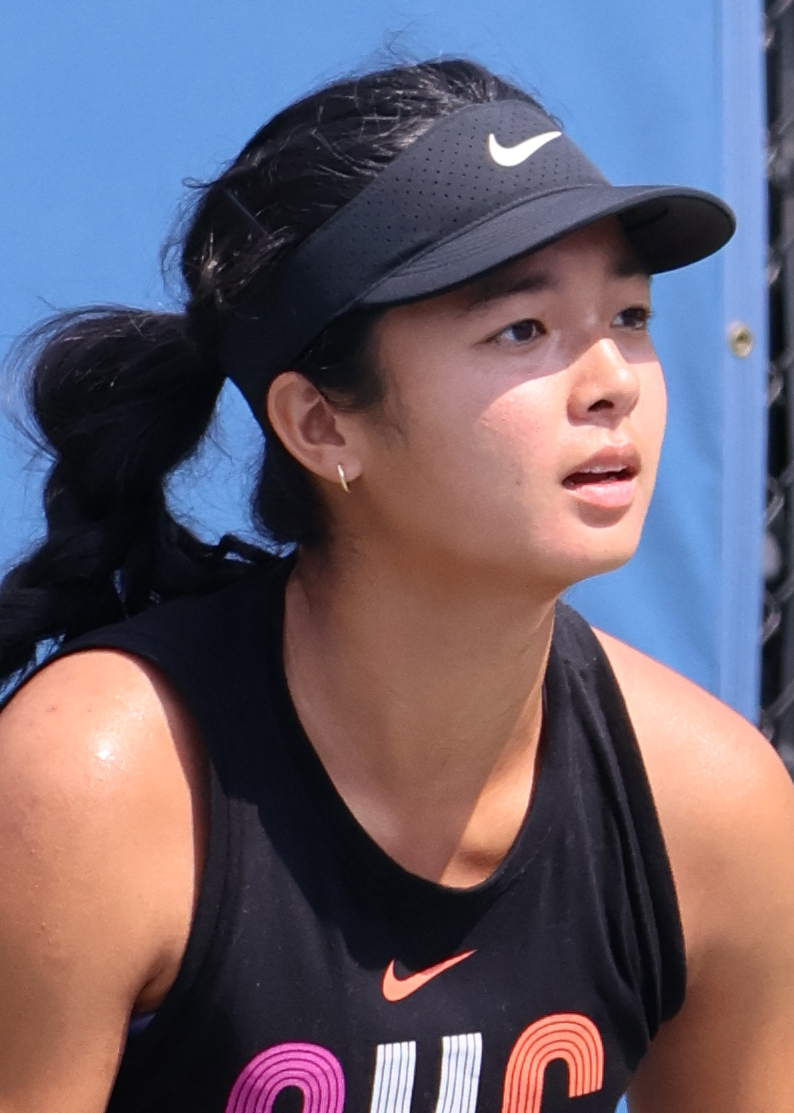
Eala at the 2024 US Open

== Performance timelines ==
Key
W	F	SF	QF	#R	RR	Q#	P#	DNQ	A	Z#	PO	G	S	B	NMS	NTI	P	NH

(W) winner; (F) finalist; (SF) semifinalist; (QF) quarterfinalist; (#R) rounds 4, 3, 2, 1; (RR) round-robin stage; (Q#) qualification round; (P#) preliminary round; (DNQ) did not qualify; (A) absent; (Z#) Davis/Fed Cup Zonal Group (with number indication) or (PO) play-off; (G) gold, (S) silver or (B) bronze Olympic/Paralympic medal; (NMS) not a Masters tournament; (NTI) not a Tier I tournament; (P) postponed; (NH) not held; (SR) strike rate (events won / competed); (W–L) win–loss record.
To avoid confusion and double counting, these charts are updated at the conclusion of a tournament or when the player's participation has ended.

Only main-draw results in WTA Tour, Grand Slam tournaments, Billie Jean King Cup and Olympic Games are included in win–loss records.

=== Singles ===
Current through the 2026 Hong Kong Open.

Tournament	2021	2022	2023	2024	2025	2026	SR	W–L	Win %
Grand Slam tournaments
Australian Open	A	A	Q1	Q1	Q1	1R	0 / 1	0–1	0%
French Open	A	A	A	Q3	1R	1R	0 / 2	0–2	0%
Wimbledon	A	A	A	Q3	1R	4R	0 / 2	3–2	60%
US Open	A	A	A	Q3	2R	3R	0 / 2	3–2	60%
Win–loss	0–0	0–0	0–0	0–0	1–3	5–4	0 / 7	6–7	46%
National representation
Billie Jean King Cup	A	A	A	Z3	A	A	0 / 4	4–0	100%
WTA 1000 tournaments
Qatar Open	NTI	A	NTI	A	A	1R	0 / 1	0–1	0%
Dubai Championships	A	NTI	A	A	A	QF	0 / 1	3–1	75%
Indian Wells Open	A	A	A	A	A	4R	0 / 1	2–1	67%
Miami Open	Q1	1R	1R	Q2	SF	4R	0 / 4	6–4	60%
Madrid Open	A	Q1	1R	2R	2R	2R	0 / 4	3–4	43%
Italian Open	A	A	A	A	1R	3R	0 / 2	2–2	50%
Canadian Open	A	A	A	A	1R	4R	0 / 2	2–2	50%
Cincinnati Open	A	A	A	A	A	3R	0 / 1	1–1	50%
China Open	NH		A	A	A	A	0 / 0	0–0	–
Wuhan Open	NH			1R	Q1	1R	0 / 2	0–2	0%
Guadalajara Open	NH	A	A	NTI			0 / 0	0–0	–
Win–loss	0–0	0–1	0–2	1–2	6–4	13–9	0 / 18	20–18	53%
Career statistics
Tournaments	1	1	6	6	13	26	Career total: 53		
Titles	0	0	0	0	0	1	Career total: 1		
Finals	0	0	0	0	1	2	Career total: 3		
Hard win–loss	0–0	0–1	0–5	0–5	8–7	29–15	1 / 34	37–33	53%
Clay win–loss	1–1	0–0	0–1	1–1	1–3	4–6	0 / 12	7–12	37%
Grass win–loss	0–0	0–0	0–0	0–0	4–3	7–4	0 / 7	11–7	61%
Overall win–loss	1–1	0–1	0–6	1–6	13–13	40–25	1 / 53	55–52	51%
Win %	50%	0%	0%	14%	50%	62%	Career total: 51%		
Year-end ranking	529	219	205	158	50	15	$3,451,480		

=== Doubles ===
Current through the 2026 Hong Kong Open.

Tournament	2021	2022	2023	2024	2025	2026	SR	W–L	Win %
Grand Slam tournaments
Australian Open	A	A	A	A	A	1R	0 / 1	0–1	0%
French Open	A	A	A	A	2R	A	0 / 1	1–1	50%
Wimbledon	A	A	A	A	1R	1R	0 / 2	0–2	0%
US Open	A	A	A	A	A	A	0 / 0	0–0	–
Win–loss	0–0	0–0	0–0	0–0	1–2	0–2	0 / 4	1–4	20%
WTA 1000 tournaments
Qatar Open	NTI	A	NTI	A	A	A	0 / 0	0–0	–
Dubai Championships	A	NTI	A	A	A	A	0 / 0	0–0	–
Indian Wells Open	A	A	A	A	A	1R	0 / 1	0–1	0%
Miami Open	A	A	A	A	A	A	0 / 0	0–0	–
Madrid Open	A	A	A	A	A	2R	0 / 1	1–1	50%
Italian Open	A	A	A	A	QF	1R	0 / 2	2–2	50%
Canadian Open	A	A	A	A	A	1R	0 / 1	0–1	0%
Cincinnati Open	A	A	A	A	A	A	0 / 0	0–0	–
China Open	NH		A	A	A	A	0 / 0	0–0	–
Wuhan Open	NH			A	A	1R	0 / 1	0–1	0%
Guadalajara Open	NH	A	A	NTI			0 / 0	0–0	–
Win–loss	0–0	0–0	0–0	0–0	2–1	1–5	0 / 6	3–6	33%
Career statistics
Tournaments	0	0	1	1	5	10	Career total: 17		
Titles	0	0	0	0	0	0	Career total: 0		
Finals	0	0	0	0	0	0	Career total: 0		
Hard win–loss	0–0	0–0	0–1	0–1	2–2	3–6	0 / 10	5–10	33%
Clay win–loss	0–0	0–0	0–0	0–0	3–2	1–2	0 / 4	4–4	50%
Grass win–loss	0–0	0–0	0–0	0–0	0–1	1–2	0 / 3	1–3	25%
Overall win–loss	0–0	0–0	0–1	0–1	5–5	5–10	0 / 17	10–17	37%
Win %	–	–	0%	0%	50%	33%	Career total: 37%		
Year-end ranking	780	594	436	239	161	148	$3,451,480		

=== Mixed doubles ===
Current through the 2026 US Open.

Tournament	2026	SR	W–L	Win %
Grand Slam tournaments
Australian Open	A	0 / 0	0–0	–
French Open	A	0 / 0	0–0	–
Wimbledon	A	0 / 0	0–0	–
US Open	1R	0 / 1	0–1	0%
Tournaments	1	Career total: 1		
Titles	0	Career total: 0		
Finals	0	Career total: 0		
Hard win–loss	0–1	0 / 1	0–1	0%
Clay win–loss	0–0	0 / 0	0–0	–
Grass win–loss	0–0	0 / 0	0–0	–
Overall win–loss	0–1	0 / 1	0–1	0%
Win %	0%	Career total: 0%		

== WTA Tour finals ==
=== Singles: 3 (1 title, 2 runner-ups) ===
Legend WTA 500 (1–0) WTA 250 (0–2)	Finals by surface Hard (1–1) Grass (0–1)	Finals by setting Outdoor (1–2)

Result	W–L	Date	Tournament	Tier	Surface	Opponent	Score
Loss	0–1	Jun 2025	Eastbourne Open, United Kingdom	WTA 250	Grass	(Australia) Maya Joint	4–6, 6–1, 6–7^{(10–12)}
Win	1–1	Aug 2026	Washington Open, United States	WTA 500	Hard	(United States) Jessica Pegula	4–6, 6–4, 6–0
Loss	1–2	Nov 2026	Hong Kong Open, China SAR	WTA 250	Hard	(United States) Claire Liu	3–6, 0–6

== WTA 125 finals ==
=== Singles: 2 (2 titles) ===
Result	W–L	Date	Tournament	Surface	Opponent	Score
Win	1–0	Sep 2025	Guadalajara 125 Open, Mexico	Hard	(Hungary) Panna Udvardy	1–6, 7–5, 6–3
Win	2–0	Jun 2026	Birmingham Open, United Kingdom	Grass	(Czech Republic) Nikola Bartůňková	5–7, 6–3, 7–5

== ITF Circuit finals ==
=== Singles: 8 (5 titles, 3 runner-ups) ===
Legend W100 tournaments (1–0) W60 tournaments (0–1) W40 tournaments (0–1) W25 tournaments (3–1) W15 tournaments (1–0)	Finals by surface Hard (5–3)

Result	W–L	Date	Tournament	Tier	Surface	Opponent	Score
Win	1–0	Jan 2021	ITF Manacor, Spain	W15	Hard	(Spain) Yvonne Cavallé Reimers	5–7, 6–1, 6–2
Win	2–0	Apr 2022	ITF Chiang Rai, Thailand	W25	Hard	(Thailand) Luksika Kumkhum	6–4, 6–2
Loss	2–1	Jun 2022	ITF Madrid Open, Spain	W60	Hard	(Spain) Marina Bassols Ribera	4–6, 5–7
Win	3–1	Jun 2023	ITF Yecla, Spain	W25	Hard	(Switzerland) Valentina Ryser	6–3, 7–5
Win	4–1	Aug 2023	ITF Roehampton, United Kingdom	W25	Hard	(Australia) Arina Rodionova	6–2, 6–3
Loss	4–2	Aug 2023	ITF Aldershot, United Kingdom	W25	Hard	(Australia) Destanee Aiava	6–3, 4–6, 1–6
Loss	4–3	Nov 2023	ITF Pétange, Luxembourg	W40	Hard (i)	(France) Océane Dodin	1–6, 5–7
Win	5–3	Jul 2024	Open Araba en Femenino, Spain	W100	Hard	(Andorra) Victoria Jiménez Kasintseva	6–4, 6–4

== Junior finals ==
=== Grand Slam tournaments ===
==== Singles: 1 (title) ====
Result	Year	Tournament	Surface	Opponent	Score
Win	2022	US Open	Hard	(Czech Republic) Lucie Havlíčková	6–2, 6–4

==== Doubles: 2 (2 titles) ====
Result	Year	Tournament	Surface	Partner	Opponents	Score
Win	2020	Australian Open	Hard	(Indonesia) Priska Madelyn Nugroho	(Slovenia) Živa Falkner (United Kingdom) Matilda Mutavdzic	6–1, 6–2
Win	2021	French Open	Clay	(Russia) Oksana Selekhmeteva	(Russia) Maria Bondarenko (Hungary) Amarissa Tóth	6–0, 7–5

=== ITF Junior Circuit ===
==== Singles: 10 (5 titles, 5 runner-ups) ====
Legend
Grade A (3–1)
Grade 2 (0–2)
Grade 4 (1–2)
Grade 5 (1–0)

Result	W–L	Date	Tournament	Tier	Surface	Opponent	Score
Loss	0–1	Jul 2018	ITF Jakarta, Indonesia	G4	Hard	(Indonesia) Priska Madelyn Nugroho	2–6, 6–4, 1–6
Win	1–1	Oct 2018	ITF Alicante, Spain	G5	Clay	(Spain) Jéssica Bouzas Maneiro	6–2, 6–3
Win	2–1	Nov 2018	ITF Makati City, Philippines	G4	Clay	(Canada) Dasha Plekhanova	6–4, 6–2
Loss	2–2	Nov 2018	ITF Manila, Philippines	G4	Clay	(Indonesia) Janice Tjen	3–6, 6–2, 5–7
Loss	2–3	Jan 2019	ITF New Delhi, India	G2	Hard	(Italy) Federica Sacco	5–7, 3–6
Loss	2–4	Jan 2019	ITF Kolkata, India	G2	Clay	(Thailand) Mai Napatt Nirundorn	6–2, 3–6, 2–6
Win	3–4	Sep 2019	ITF Cape Town, South Africa	GA	Hard	(Czech Republic) Linda Fruhvirtová	6–3, 6–3
Loss	3–5	Oct 2019	ITF Osaka, Japan	GA	Hard	(France) Diane Parry	2–6, 4–6
Win	4–5	Jul 2021	ITF Milan, Italy	GA	Clay	(Czech Republic) Nikola Bartůňková	6–3, 6–3
Win	5–5	Sep 2022	US Open, United States	GA	Hard	(Czech Republic) Lucie Havlíčková	6–2, 6–4

==== Doubles: 7 (5 titles, 2 runner-ups) ====
Legend
Grade A (4–0)
Grade 1 (0–1)
Grade 2 (0–1)
Grade 5 (1–0)

Result	W–L	Date	Tournament	Tier	Surface	Partner	Opponents	Score
Win	1–0	Oct 2018	ITF Alicante, Spain	G5	Clay	(Germany) Joelle Lilly Sophie Steur	(Russia) Maria Dzemeshkevich (United Kingdom) Lily Hutchings	6–2, 6–2
Loss	1–1	Jun 2019	ITF Offenbach, Germany	G1	Clay	(Australia) Annerly Georgopoulos	(France) Séléna Janicijevic (France) Carole Monnet	4–6, 2–6
Loss	1–2	Sep 2019	ITF Cape Town, South Africa	G2	Hard	(United States) Elvina Kalieva	(Poland) Weronika Baszak (United Kingdom) Matilda Mutavdzic	3–6, 6–4, [3–10]
Win	2–2	Dec 2019	ITF Plantation, United States	GA	Clay	(Belarus) Evialina Laskevich	(Canada) Jada Bui (Canada) Mélodie Collard	6–3, 6–7^{(3)}, [10–5]
Win	3–2	Feb 2020	Australian Open, Australia	GA	Hard	(Indonesia) Priska Madelyn Nugroho	(Slovenia) Živa Falkner (United Kingdom) Matilda Mutavdzic	6–1, 6–2
Win	4–2	Jun 2021	French Open, France	GA	Clay	(Russia) Oksana Selekhmeteva	(Russia) Maria Bondarenko (Hungary) Amarissa Tóth	6–0, 7–5
Win	5–2	Jul 2021	ITF Milan, Italy	GA	Clay	(United States) Madison Sieg	(Croatia) Lucija Ćirić Bagarić (Belgium) Sofia Costoulas	6–4, 4–6, [13–11]

== WTA Tour career earnings ==
Year	Grand Slam titles (Note: Includes singles, doubles and mixed doubles titles.)	WTA titles	Total titles	Earnings ($)	Money list rank
2021	0	0	0	13,524	508
2022	0	0	0	49,547	340
2023	0	0	0	93,340	280
2024	0	0	0	292,201	158
2025	0	0	0	907,777	74
2026	0	1	1	2,087,795	26
Career	0	1	1	3,451,480	254

*As of October 12, 2026

== National representation ==
Eala has represented the Philippines at the Billie Jean King Cup, the Asian Games and the SEA Games. She has won nine medals at multi-sport events: one gold, in women's singles at the 2025 SEA Games, and eight bronze.

=== Billie Jean King Cup ===
Group membership Asia/Oceania Zone Group III (4–0)	Matches by type Singles (4–0)	Matches by surface Hard (4–0)

==== Singles (4–0) ====
Edition	Round	Date	Location	Surface	Opponent nation	Opponent player	Result	Score	Team result	Team score	Ref
2024	Z3 RR	Nov 2024	Manama, Bahrain	Hard	Guam	Fremont Gibson	Win	6–0, 6–0	Win	3–0	
2024	Z3 RR	Nov 2024	Manama, Bahrain	Hard	Qatar	Mubaraka Al-Naimi	Win	6–0, 6–0	Win	3–0	
2024	Z3 RR	Nov 2024	Manama, Bahrain	Hard	Nepal	Abhilasha Bista	Win	6–0, 6–0	Win	3–0	
2024	Z3 PO	Nov 2024	Manama, Bahrain	Hard	Laos	Malaylack Delilah Pathummakuronen	Win	6–1, 6–1	Win	2–0	

=== Multi-sport events (1 gold medal, 8 bronze medals) ===
Medals by event
Event	Gold	Silver	Bronze	Total
Asian Games	0	0	3	3
SEA Games	1	0	5	6
Total	1	0	8	9

Medals by discipline
Discipline	Gold	Silver	Bronze	Total
Singles	1	0	3	4
Mixed doubles	0	0	3	3
Team	0	0	2	2
Total	1	0	8	9

Medals by surface
Surface	Gold	Silver	Bronze	Total
Hard	1	0	8	9

==== Medal matches ====
===== Singles: 4 (1 gold medal, 3 bronze medals) =====
Result	Date	Tournament	Surface	Opponent	Score
Bronze	May 2022	SEA Games, Bắc Ninh	Hard	(Thailand) Luksika Kumkhum	4–6, 1–6
Bronze	Sep 2023	Asian Games, Hangzhou	Hard	(China) Zheng Qinwen	1–6, 7–6^{(7–5)}, 3–6
Gold	Dec 2025	SEA Games, Nonthaburi	Hard	(Thailand) Mananchaya Sawangkaew	6–1, 6–2
Bronze	Oct 2026	Asian Games, Nagoya	Hard	(China) Wang Xiyu	6–3, 3–6, 2–6

===== Mixed doubles: 3 (3 bronze medals) =====
Result	Date	Tournament	Surface	Partner	Opponents	Score
Bronze	May 2022	SEA Games, Bắc Ninh	Hard	(Philippines) Treat Huey	(Thailand) Pruchya Isaro / Patcharin Cheapchandej	6–3, 3–6, [4–10]
Bronze	Sep 2023	Asian Games, Hangzhou	Hard	(Philippines) Francis Alcantara	(Chinese Taipei) Huang Tsung-hao / Liang En-shuo	5–7, 3–6
Bronze	Dec 2025	SEA Games, Nonthaburi	Hard	(Philippines) Francis Alcantara	(Thailand) Patcharin Cheapchandej / Pawit Sornlaksup	7–5, 5–7, [7–10]

===== Team: 2 (2 bronze medals) =====
Result	Date	Tournament	Surface	Teammates	Opponents	Score
Bronze	May 2022	SEA Games, Bắc Ninh	Hard	Shaira Rivera; Marian Capadocia; Jenaila Rose Prulla	Thailand: Patcharin Cheapchandej; Luksika Kumkhum; Pimrada Jattavapornvanit; Anchisa Chanta	0–2
Bronze	Dec 2025	SEA Games, Nonthaburi	Hard	Alexa Joy Milliam; Shaira Rivera; Stefi Marithe Aludo; Tennielle Madis	Thailand: Lanlana Tararudee; Mananchaya Sawangkaew; Patcharin Cheapchandej; Peangtarn Plipuech; Thasaporn Naklo	0–3

==== Asian Games (9–4) ====
Matches by tournament
2022 Hangzhou Asian Games (6–2)
2026 Aichi–Nagoya Asian Games (3–2)

Matches by discipline
Singles (5–2)
Doubles (1–1)
Mixed doubles (3–1)

Matches by surface
Hard (9–4)

Medals by tournament
Edition	Gold	Silver	Bronze	Total
2022	0	0	2	2
2026	0	0	1	1
Total	0	0	3	3

Medals by discipline
Discipline	Gold	Silver	Bronze	Total
Singles	0	0	2	2
Mixed doubles	0	0	1	1
Total	0	0	3	3

Medals by surface
Surface	Gold	Silver	Bronze	Total
Hard	0	0	3	3

Medal details
Edition	Singles	Mixed doubles
2022	3rd place, bronze medalist(s)	3rd place, bronze medalist(s)
2026	3rd place, bronze medalist(s)	—

===== Singles (5–2) =====
Round	Opponent	Result	Score
2022 Hangzhou Asian Games
2R	(Pakistan) Sarah Mahboob Khan	Win	6–0, 6–0
3R	(India) Rutuja Bhosale	Win	7–6^{(7–5)}, 6–2
QF	(Japan) Kyōka Okamura	Win	0–6, 7–5, 6–0
SF	(China) Zheng Qinwen	Loss	1–6, 7–6^{(7–5)}, 3–6
2026 Aichi–Nagoya Asian Games
2R	(Thailand) Patcharin Cheapchandej	Win	6–1, 6–0
QF	(Chinese Taipei) Joanna Garland	Win	7–5, 6–0
SF	(China) Wang Xiyu	Loss	6–3, 3–6, 2–6

===== Doubles (1–1) =====
Round	Partner	Opponents	Result	Score
2026 Aichi–Nagoya Asian Games
1R	(Philippines) Shaira Rivera	(Hong Kong) Lai Ching Laam / Kallista Liu	Win	6–1, 6–3
2R	(Philippines) Shaira Rivera	(China) Jiang Xinyu / Yang Zhaoxuan	Loss	5–7, 2–6

===== Mixed doubles (3–1) =====
Round	Partner	Opponents	Result	Score
2022 Hangzhou Asian Games
2R	(Philippines) Francis Alcantara	(Nepal) Pranav Khanal / Sunira Thapa	Win	6–0, 6–0
3R	(Philippines) Francis Alcantara	(India) Yuki Bhambri / Ankita Raina	Win	6–4, 4–6, [10–8]
QF	(Philippines) Francis Alcantara	(Thailand) Maximus Jones / Luksika Kumkhum	Win	6–4, 6–4
SF	(Philippines) Francis Alcantara	(Chinese Taipei) Huang Tsung-hao / Liang En-shuo	Loss	5–7, 3–6

==== SEA Games (8–4) ====
Matches by tournament
2021 Vietnam SEA Games (4–3)
2025 Thailand SEA Games (4–1)

Matches by discipline
Singles (5–1)
Mixed doubles (2–2)
Team (1–1)

Matches by surface
Hard (8–4)

Medals by tournament
Edition	Gold	Silver	Bronze	Total
2021	0	0	3	3
2025	1	0	2	3
Total	1	0	5	6

Medals by discipline
Discipline	Gold	Silver	Bronze	Total
Singles	1	0	1	2
Mixed doubles	0	0	2	2
Team	0	0	2	2
Total	1	0	5	6

Medals by surface
Surface	Gold	Silver	Bronze	Total
Hard	1	0	5	6

Medal details
Edition	Singles	Mixed doubles	Team
2021	3rd place, bronze medalist(s)	3rd place, bronze medalist(s)	3rd place, bronze medalist(s)
2025	1st place, gold medalist(s)	3rd place, bronze medalist(s)	3rd place, bronze medalist(s)

===== Singles (5–1) =====
Round	Opponent	Result	Score	Ref
2021 Vietnam SEA Games
1R	(Laos) Phonephathep Philavong	Win	6–1, 6–1	
QF	(Malaysia) Jo-Leen Saw	Win	6–2, 6–0	
SF	(Thailand) Luksika Kumkhum	Loss	4–6, 1–6	
2025 Thailand SEA Games
QF	(Malaysia) Shihomi Li Xuan Leong	Win	6–3, 6–1	
SF	(Thailand) Thasaporn Naklo	Win	6–1, 6–4	
F	(Thailand) Mananchaya Sawangkaew	Win	6–1, 6–2	

====== Finals: 1 win ======
Result	W–L	Event	Opponent	Score
Win	1–0	2025 Thailand SEA Games	(Thailand) Mananchaya Sawangkaew	6–1, 6–2

===== Mixed doubles (2–2) =====
Round	Partner	Opponents	Result	Score	Ref
2021 Vietnam SEA Games
QF	(Philippines) Treat Huey	(Laos) Phonephathep Philavong / Sataporn Simmalavong	Win	6–2, 6–2	
SF	(Philippines) Treat Huey	(Thailand) Pruchya Isaro / Patcharin Cheapchandej	Loss	6–3, 3–6, [4–10]	
2025 Thailand SEA Games
QF	(Philippines) Francis Alcantara	(Singapore) Wei Lin Deanne Choo / Daniel Quinsay Abadia	Win	6–4, 6–3	
SF	(Philippines) Francis Alcantara	(Thailand) Patcharin Cheapchandej / Pawit Sornlaksup	Loss	7–5, 5–7, [7–10]	

===== Team (1–1) =====
Only rubbers played by Eala count toward the win–loss record.

Round	Teammates	Opponents	Tie		Rubbers			Eala played	Ref
Round	Teammates	Opponents	Result	Score	Rubber	Result	Score	Eala played	Ref
2021 Vietnam SEA Games
1R	Shaira Rivera; Marian Capadocia; Jenaila Rose Prulla	Malaysia: Jo-Leen Saw; Elysia Wan	Win	2–0	Singles 1	Win	7–5, 6–4	No	
1R	Shaira Rivera; Marian Capadocia; Jenaila Rose Prulla	Malaysia: Jo-Leen Saw; Elysia Wan	Win	2–0	Singles 2	Win	6–1, 6–4	Yes	
SF	Shaira Rivera; Marian Capadocia; Jenaila Rose Prulla	Thailand: Patcharin Cheapchandej; Luksika Kumkhum; Pimrada Jattavapornvanit; Anchisa Chanta	Loss	0–2	Singles 1	Loss	3–6, 6–7^{(0–7)}	No	
SF	Shaira Rivera; Marian Capadocia; Jenaila Rose Prulla	Thailand: Patcharin Cheapchandej; Luksika Kumkhum; Pimrada Jattavapornvanit; Anchisa Chanta	Loss	0–2	Singles 2	Loss	2–6, 6–0, 2–6	Yes	
2025 Thailand SEA Games
QF	Alexa Joy Milliam; Shaira Rivera; Stefi Marithe Aludo; Tennielle Madis	Vietnam: Thi Mai Linh Nguyen; Savanna Lý-Nguyễn; Hong Hanh Ngo; Trần Thụy Thanh Trúc; Chanelle Vân Nguyễn	Win	2–1	Singles 1	Win	6–2, 6–2	No (Note: Eala did not play but was part of the roster.)	
QF	Alexa Joy Milliam; Shaira Rivera; Stefi Marithe Aludo; Tennielle Madis	Vietnam: Thi Mai Linh Nguyen; Savanna Lý-Nguyễn; Hong Hanh Ngo; Trần Thụy Thanh Trúc; Chanelle Vân Nguyễn	Win	2–1	Singles 2	Loss	2–6, 6–4, 6–7^{(3–7)}	No	
QF	Alexa Joy Milliam; Shaira Rivera; Stefi Marithe Aludo; Tennielle Madis	Vietnam: Thi Mai Linh Nguyen; Savanna Lý-Nguyễn; Hong Hanh Ngo; Trần Thụy Thanh Trúc; Chanelle Vân Nguyễn	Win	2–1	Doubles	Win	7–5, 3–6, 6–2	No	
SF	Alexa Joy Milliam; Shaira Rivera; Stefi Marithe Aludo; Tennielle Madis	Thailand: Lanlana Tararudee; Mananchaya Sawangkaew; Patcharin Cheapchandej; Peangtarn Plipuech; Thasaporn Naklo	Loss	0–3	Singles 1	Loss	2–6, 2–6	No	
SF	Alexa Joy Milliam; Shaira Rivera; Stefi Marithe Aludo; Tennielle Madis	Thailand: Lanlana Tararudee; Mananchaya Sawangkaew; Patcharin Cheapchandej; Peangtarn Plipuech; Thasaporn Naklo	Loss	0–3	Singles 2	Loss	2–6, 0–6	No	
SF	Alexa Joy Milliam; Shaira Rivera; Stefi Marithe Aludo; Tennielle Madis	Thailand: Lanlana Tararudee; Mananchaya Sawangkaew; Patcharin Cheapchandej; Peangtarn Plipuech; Thasaporn Naklo	Loss	0–3	Doubles	Loss	6–7^{(3–7)}, 6–7^{(4–7)}	No	

== Wins against top 10 players ==
- Eala holds a 9–5 (64%) win–loss record against players ranked in the WTA top 10 at the time of play.
- Eala won 9 of her first 13 career matches against top 10 opponents, the most of any player since 1990, with only Martina Navratilova, Steffi Graf, and Monica Seles scoring more in WTA history.

Season	2025	2026	Total
Wins	2	7	9

No.	Opponent	Rk	Event	Surface	Rd	Score	Rk	Years	Ref
1	(United States) Madison Keys	5	Miami Open, United States	Hard	3R	6–4, 6–2	140	2025	
2	(Poland) Iga Świątek	2	Miami Open, United States	Hard	QF	6–2, 7–5	140	2025	
3	(Italy) Jasmine Paolini	8	Dubai Championships, UAE	Hard	2R	6–1, 7–6^{(7–5)}	47	2026	
4	(United States) Coco Gauff	4	Indian Wells Open, United States	Hard	3R	6–2, 2–0 ret.	32	2026	
5	(Kazakhstan) Elena Rybakina	2	Berlin Tennis Open, Germany	Grass	2R	7–5, 6–4	35	2026	
6	(Ukraine) Elina Svitolina	8	Berlin Tennis Open, Germany	Grass	QF	6–3, 6–4	35	2026	
7	(Poland) Iga Świątek	3	Wimbledon, United Kingdom	Grass	3R	7–6^{(11–9)}, 6–2	32	2026	
8	(Ukraine) Elina Svitolina	10	Washington Open, United States	Hard	QF	6–3, 6–4	28	2026	
9	(United States) Jessica Pegula	3	Washington Open, United States	Hard	F	4–6, 6–4, 6–0	28	2026	

- Key: (Rk) first use, opponent rank; (Rd) round; (Rk) 2nd use, player rank; (Ref) reference; (F) final; (SF) semifinal; (QF) quarterfinal; (#R) rounds 4, 3, 2, 1; (RR) round-robin stage; (Q#) qualifying rounds or stages (3), 2, 1.

*As of August 17, 2026

== Longest winning streak ==
=== 7-match winning streak (2026) ===
#	Tournament	Tier	Start date	Surface	Rd	Opponent	Rk	Score
–	Wimbledon	Grand Slam	June 29, 2026	Grass	4R	(Italy) Jasmine Paolini (13)	17	4–6, 6–4, 3–6
1	Washington Open	WTA 500	July 27, 2026	Hard	1R	(China) Zheng Qinwen (WC)	123	4–6, 6–4, 6–1
2	Washington Open	WTA 500	July 27, 2026	Hard	2R	(Canada) Leylah Fernandez (7)	34	6–2, 7–6^{(7–1)}
3	Washington Open	WTA 500	July 27, 2026	Hard	QF	(Ukraine) Elina Svitolina (2)	10	6–3, 6–4
4	Washington Open	WTA 500	July 27, 2026	Hard	SF	(Japan) Naomi Osaka (3)	13	6–4, 6–2
5	Washington Open	WTA 500	July 27, 2026	Hard	W	(United States) Jessica Pegula (1)	3	4–6, 6–4, 6–0
6	Canadian Open	WTA 1000	August 3, 2026	Hard	2R	(United States) Alycia Parks	71	6–1, 4–6, 6–2
7	Canadian Open	WTA 1000	August 3, 2026	Hard	3R	(United States) Caty McNally	70	6–3, 5–7, 6–4
–	Canadian Open	WTA 1000	August 3, 2026	Hard	4R	(Switzerland) Belinda Bencic (12)	14	4–6, 0–6

== Career Grand Slam statistics ==
=== Grand Slam tournament seedings ===
==== Singles ====
Year	Australian Open	French Open	Wimbledon	US Open
2023	qualifying round only	did not play	did not play	did not play
2024	qualifying round only	qualifying round only	qualifying round only	qualifying round only
2025	qualifying round only	unseeded	unseeded	unseeded
2026	unseeded	unseeded	29th	17th

==== Doubles ====
Year	Australian Open	French Open	Wimbledon	US Open
2025	did not play	unseeded	unseeded	did not play
2026	unseeded	did not play	unseeded	did not play

==== Mixed doubles ====
Year	Australian Open	French Open	Wimbledon	US Open
2026	did not play	did not play	did not play	unseeded

=== Best Grand Slam results details ===
==== Singles ====
Australian Open
2026 (unseeded)
Round	Opponent	Rank	Score
1R	(United States) Alycia Parks	99	6–0, 3–6, 2–6

Wimbledon
2026 (29th)
Round	Opponent	Rank	Score
1R	(Mexico) Renata Zarazúa	75	6–1, 6–2
2R	(Australia) Maya Joint	87	3–6, 6–2, 6–0
3R	(Poland) Iga Świątek (3)	3	7–6^{(11–9)}, 6–2
4R	(Italy) Jasmine Paolini (13)	17	4–6, 6–4, 3–6

French Open
2025 (unseeded)
Round	Opponent	Rank	Score
1R	(Colombia) Emiliana Arango	85	0–6, 6–2, 3–6
2026 (unseeded)
Round	Opponent	Rank	Score
1R	(United States) Iva Jovic (17)	17	4–6, 2–6

US Open
2026 (17th)
Round	Opponent	Rank	Score
1R	(United States) Mary Stoiana (Q)	122	6–1, 6–2
2R	(Ukraine) Oleksandra Oliynykova	46	6–1, 6–4
3R	(United States) Iva Jovic (14)	14	5–7, 6–3, 5–7

==== Doubles ====
Australian Open
2026 (unseeded)
Round	Partner	Opponents	Score
1R	(Brazil) Ingrid Martins	(Japan) Shuko Aoyama (Poland) Magda Linette	6–7^{(3–7)}, 6–2, 3–6

Wimbledon
2025 (unseeded)
Round	Partner	Opponents	Score
1R	(Germany) Eva Lys	(United States) Quinn Gleason (Brazil) Ingrid Martins	4–6, 2–6
2026 (unseeded)
Round	Partner	Opponents	Score
1R	(Czech Republic) Nikola Bartůňková	(United States) Sofia Kenin (Latvia) Jeļena Ostapenko	6–3, 3–6, 1–6

French Open
2025 (unseeded)
Round	Partner	Opponents	Score
1R	(Mexico) Renata Zarazúa	(United Kingdom) Emily Appleton (Spain) Yvonne Cavallé Reimers	7–6, 6–4
2R	(Mexico) Renata Zarazúa	(Serbia) Olga Danilović (Austria) Anastasia Potapova	1–6, 3–6

US Open
N/A

==== Mixed doubles ====
Australian Open N/A	French Open N/A
Wimbledon N/A	US Open 2026 (unseeded): Round / Partner / Opponents / Score; 1R / (Canada) Felix Auger-Aliassime / (Ukraine) Elina Svitolina (France) Gaël Monfils / 1–4, 1–4

== Exhibition matches ==
=== Singles ===
Result	Date	Tournament	Surface	Opponent	Score	Ref
Loss	Dec 2025	Macau Tennis Masters, China SAR	Hard (i)	Mirra Andreeva	4–6, 2–6	
Win	Jan 2026	Kooyong Classic, Australia	Hard	(Croatia) Donna Vekić	6–3, 6–4	
Loss	Aug 2026	Stars of the Open, United States	Hard	(United States) Iva Jovic	3–6	
