= Tennis at the 2026 Asian Games – Women's doubles =

Women's doubles at the 2026 Asian Games
- Venue: Higashiyama Park Tennis Center
- Dates: 28 September – 3 October 2026
- Competitors: 52 from 16 nations

Medalists
| gold medal | Hsieh Su-wei; Liang En-shuo | Chinese Taipei |
| silver medal | Chan Hao-ching; Wu Fang-hsien | Chinese Taipei |
| bronze medal | Eudice Chong; Cody Wong | Hong Kong |
| bronze medal | Anna Danilina; Yulia Putintseva | Kazakhstan |

Women's doubles
- Tennis at the 2026 Asian Games

Events
| Singles | men | women |
| Doubles | men | women | mixed |
- Asian Games

The women's doubles tennis event at the 2026 Asian Games took place at the Higashiyama Park Tennis Center, Nagoya, Aichi Prefecture, Japan from 28 September to 3 October 2026. Twenty-six pairs from 16 countries participated in the event.

Hsieh Su-wei and Liang En-shuo defeated reigning gold medalist Chan Hao-ching and Wu Fang-hsien 6–4, 4–6, [10–5] to win gold in women's doubles. Chan and her sister Latisha were the defending champions, but Latisha retired from tennis in January 2026.

== Schedule ==
All times are Japan Standard Time (UTC+09:00)

| Date | Time | Event |
|---|---|---|
| Monday, 28 September 2026 | 10:30 | First round |
| Tuesday, 29 September 2026 | 12:00 | First round |
| Wednesday, 30 September 2026 | 10:00 | Second round |
| Thursday, 1 October 2026 | 14:00 | Quarterfinals |
| Friday, 2 October 2023 | 14:30 | Semifinals |
| Saturday, 3 October 2023 | 12:30 | Gold medal match |

== Results ==
Legend

- WO — Won by walkover

=== Final ===
| Gold medal match |
| 5 | Chan Hao-ching (TPE); Wu Fang-hsien (TPE) | 4 | 6 | [5] |
| 2 | Hsieh Su-wei (TPE); Liang En-shuo (TPE) | 6 | 4 | [10] |

=== Top half ===
First round
Patcharin Cheapchandej (THA); Thasaporn Naklo (THA) | 4 | 6 | [5]
Back Da-yeon (KOR); Jang Su-jeong (KOR) | 6 | 3 | [10]
Anjali Kirana Junarto (INA); Meydiana Laviola Reinnamah (INA) | 3 | 6^{4}
Stefi Aludo (PHI); Tennielle Madis (PHI) | 6 | 7^{7}
Sumaya Tukhtaeva (TJK); Anisa Yakhyaeva (TJK) | 0 | 0
Zhibek Kulambayeva (KAZ); Sonja Zhiyenbayeva (KAZ) | 6 | 6
Chogsomjavyn Maralgoo (MGL); Chogsomjavyn Martaa (MGL) | 6 | 6
Mahin Aftab Qureshi (PAK); Ushna Suhail (PAK) | 1 | 0

Second round
1 | Guo Hanyu (CHN); Zhang Shuai (CHN) | 6 | 6
Back Da-yeon (KOR); Jang Su-jeong (KOR) | 3 | 4
Stefi Aludo (PHI); Tennielle Madis (PHI) | 3 | 1
5 | Chan Hao-ching (TPE); Wu Fang-hsien (TPE) | 6 | 6
4 | Shuko Aoyama (JPN); Ena Shibahara (JPN) | 4 | 4
Zhibek Kulambayeva (KAZ); Sonja Zhiyenbayeva (KAZ) | 6 | 6
Chogsomjavyn Maralgoo (MGL); Chogsomjavyn Martaa (MGL) | 4 | 2
6 | Eudice Chong (HKG); Cody Wong (HKG) | 6 | 6

Quarterfinals
1 | Guo Hanyu (CHN); Zhang Shuai (CHN) | 6^{2} | 6 | [13]
5 | Chan Hao-ching (TPE); Wu Fang-hsien (TPE) | 7^{7} | 3 | [15]
Zhibek Kulambayeva (KAZ); Sonja Zhiyenbayeva (KAZ) | 1 | 3
6 | Eudice Chong (HKG); Cody Wong (HKG) | 6 | 6

Semifinals
5 | Chan Hao-ching (TPE); Wu Fang-hsien (TPE) | 6 | 6
6 | Eudice Chong (HKG); Cody Wong (HKG) | 4 | 2

=== Bottom half ===
First round
8 | Rutuja Bhosale (IND); Ankita Raina (IND) | 7 | 3 | [5]
Anna Danilina (KAZ); Yulia Putintseva (KAZ) | 5 | 6 | [10]
Anchisa Chanta (THA); Peangtarn Plipuech (THA) | 6 | 6
Saiyora Rajabalieva (TJK); Anastasiya Tursunova (TJK) | 0 | 0
Lai Ching Laam (HKG); Kallista Liu (HKG) | 1 | 3
Alexandra Eala (PHI); Shaira Rivera (PHI) | 6 | 6
7 | Momoko Kobori (JPN); Ayano Shimizu (JPN) | 6 | 6
Swastika Bista (NEP); Shivali Gurung (NEP) | 0 | 0
Aldarkhishigiin Khongorzul (MGL); Ganbaataryn Yesügen (MGL) | 1 | 0
Mandegar Farzami (IRI); Meshkatolzahra Safi (IRI) | 6 | 6
Daria Shubina (UZB); Sevil Yuldasheva (UZB)
Jeong Bo-young (KOR); Park So-hyun (KOR) | W | O

Second round
Anna Danilina (KAZ); Yulia Putintseva (KAZ) | 5 | 6 | [10]
Anchisa Chanta (THA); Peangtarn Plipuech (THA) | 7 | 3 | [6]
Alexandra Eala (PHI); Shaira Rivera (PHI) | 5 | 2
3 | Jiang Xinyu (CHN); Yang Zhaoxuan (CHN) | 7 | 6
7 | Momoko Kobori (JPN); Ayano Shimizu (JPN) | 6 | 6
Mandegar Farzami (IRI); Meshkatolzahra Safi (IRI) | 0 | 0
Jeong Bo-young (KOR); Park So-hyun (KOR)
2 | Hsieh Su-wei (TPE); Liang En-shuo (TPE) | W | O

Quarterfinals
Anna Danilina (KAZ); Yulia Putintseva (KAZ) | W | O
3 | Jiang Xinyu (CHN); Yang Zhaoxuan (CHN)
7 | Momoko Kobori (JPN); Ayano Shimizu (JPN) | 2 | 6 | [0]
2 | Hsieh Su-wei (TPE); Liang En-shuo (TPE) | 6 | 3 | [10]

Semifinals
Anna Danilina (KAZ); Yulia Putintseva (KAZ) | 6^{3} | 6^{5}
2 | Hsieh Su-wei (TPE); Liang En-shuo (TPE) | 7^{7} | 7^{7}
