= 2020–21 Billie Jean King Cup Asia/Oceania Zone Group II – play-offs =

Subsection of tennis competition

The play-offs of the 2020–21 Billie Jean King Cup Asia/Oceania Zone Group II were the final stages of the Group II zonal competition involving teams from Asia and Oceania. Using the positions determined in their pools, the eighteen teams faced off to determine their placing in the 2020–21 Billie Jean King Cup Asia/Oceania Zone Group II. The top two teams advanced to Group I for 2022.

== Pool results ==
Placing	Pool A (Wellington)	Pool B (Wellington)
1	New Zealand	Philippines
2	Pakistan	Thailand
3	Mongolia	Guam
4	Singapore	Turkmenistan

== Promotional play-offs ==
The first-placed teams of each pool played against one another in a head-to-head round. The winners of each round advanced to the 2022 Asia/Oceania Zone Group I.

=== New Zealand vs. Philippines ===
New Zealand
2
Renouf Tennis Centre, Wellington, New Zealand
8 February 2020
Hard

Philippines
1

			1	2	3
1	(New Zealand) (Philippines)	Valentina Ivanov; Shaira Hope Rivera	7; 5	6; 1
2	(New Zealand) (Philippines)	Paige Hourigan; Marian Capadocia	6; 2	6; 3
3	(New Zealand) (Philippines)	Emily Fanning / Kelly Southwood; Marian Capadocia / Shaira Hope Rivera	3; 6	6; 4	[9] [11]

== 3rd to 4th place play-offs ==
The second-placed teams of each pool played against one another in a head-to-head round to determine the 3rd and 4th placings.

=== Thailand vs. Pakistan ===
Thailand
3
Renouf Tennis Centre, Wellington, New Zealand
8 February 2020
Hard

Pakistan
0

			1	2	3
1	(Thailand) (Pakistan)	Watsachol Sawatdee; Mahin Qureshi	6; 3	6; 0
2	(Thailand) (Pakistan)	Anchisa Chanta; Ushna Suhail	6; 3	6^{3} 7^{7}	6; 2
3	(Thailand) (Pakistan)	Tamachan Momkoonthod / Tamarine Tanasugarn; Meheq Khokhar / Sara Mansoor	6; 0	6; 1

== 5th to 6th place play-offs ==
The third-placed teams of each pool played against one another in a head-to-head round to determine the 5th and 6th placings.

=== Guam vs. Mongolia ===
Guam
3
Renouf Tennis Centre, Wellington, New Zealand
8 February 2020
Hard

Mongolia
0

			1	2	3
1	(Guam) (Mongolia)	Katrina Lai; Shinejargal Battur	6; 2	6; 2
2	(Guam) (Mongolia)	Nadine Del Carmen; Jargal Altansarnai	0; 6	7; 5	6; 2
3	(Guam) (Mongolia)	Charlayne Espinosa / Katrina Lai; Shinejargal Battur / Bolor Enkhbayar	6; 1	6^{3} 7^{7}	[10] [4]

== 7th to 8th place play-offs ==
The second-placed teams of each pool played against one another in a head-to-head round to determine the 7th and 8th placings.

=== Singapore vs. Turkmenistan ===
Singapore
2
Renouf Tennis Centre, Wellington, New Zealand
8 February 2020
Hard

Turkmenistan
0

			1	2	3
1	(Singapore) (Turkmenistan)	Sarah Pang; Arzuv Klycheva	7; 5	6; 2
2	(Singapore) (Turkmenistan)	Izabella Tan Hui-xin; Bahar Toymyradova	6; 1	6; 3
3	(Singapore) (Turkmenistan)	Sarah Pang / Tammy Tan; Rozhan Karajayeva / Arzuv Klycheva				not played

== Final placements ==
Placing	Teams
Promoted/First	New Zealand
Second	Philippines
Third	Thailand
Fourth	Pakistan
Fifth	Guam
Sixth	Mongolia
Seventh	Singapore
Eighth	Turkmenistan

- New Zealand was promoted to Asia/Oceania Zone Group I in 2022.
