= Tennis at the 2026 Asian Games – Mixed doubles =

Mixed doubles at the 2026 Asian Games
- Venue: Higashiyama Park Tennis Center
- Dates: 27 September – 3 October 2026
- Competitors: 60 from 16 nations

Medalists
gold medal	Jay Friend; Ena Shibahara	Japan
silver medal	Yusuke Kusuhara; Shuko Aoyama	Japan
bronze medal	Zhang Tianhui; Jiang Xinyu	China
bronze medal	Tseng Chun-hsin; Hsieh Su-wei	Chinese Taipei

Mixed doubles
- Tennis at the 2026 Asian Games

Events
Singles	men	women
Doubles	men	women	mixed
- Asian Games

The mixed doubles tennis event at the 2026 Asian Games took place at the Higashiyama Park Tennis Center, Nagoya, Aichi Prefecture, Japan from 27 September to 3 October 2026. Sixty players from 16 countries participated in the event.

Ena Shibahara and Jay Friend defeated Shuko Aoyama and Yusuke Kusuhara 6–3, 6–4 in an all-Japanese final to win gold in mixed doubles. It was a second medal in two days for Kusuhara, following his men's doubles gold with Shunsuke Nakagawa.

== Schedule ==
All times are Japan Standard Time (UTC+09:00)

Date	Time	Event
Sunday, 27 September 2026	18:30	First round
Monday, 28 September 2026	12:30	First round
Tuesday, 29 September 2026	14:30	First round
Wednesday, 30 September 2026	16:30	Second round
Thursday, 1 October 2026	16:30	Quarterfinals
Friday, 2 October 2023	16:30	Semifinals
Saturday, 3 October 2023	14:00	Gold medal match

== Results ==
=== Final ===
Gold medal match
5	Yusuke Kusuhara (JPN); Shuko Aoyama (JPN)	3	4
	Jay Friend (JPN); Ena Shibahara (JPN)	6	6

=== Top half ===
First round
Pürevdorjiin Undrakh (MGL); Enkhjargalyn Sonomyanzum (MGL)	3	6	[10]
Shodmon Kurbonov (TJK); Anastasiya Tursunova (TJK)	6	1	[6]
Aqeel Khan (PAK); Ushna Suhail (PAK)	2	1
Beibit Zhukayev (KAZ); Zhibek Kulambayeva (KAZ)	6	6
Lucky Candra Kurniawan (INA); Anjali Kirana Junarto (INA)	5	1
7	Zhang Tianhui (CHN); Jiang Xinyu (CHN)	7	6
4	Sriram Balaji (IND); Ankita Raina (IND)	4	4
Kai Thompson (HKG); Eudice Chong (HKG)	6	6
Shin Woo-bin (KOR); Ku Yeon-woo (KOR)	6	6
Thanapet Chanta (THA); Anchisa Chanta (THA)	3	2
Kasra Rahmani (IRI); Meshkatolzahra Safi (IRI)	4	6	[8]
Francis Alcantara (PHI); Shaira Rivera (PHI)	6	1	[10]
Pradip Khadka (NEP); Shivali Gurung (NEP)	0	1
5	Yusuke Kusuhara (JPN); Shuko Aoyama (JPN)	6	6

Second round
1	Ray Ho (TPE); Chan Hao-ching (TPE)	6	6
Pürevdorjiin Undrakh (MGL); Enkhjargalyn Sonomyanzum (MGL)	0	0
Beibit Zhukayev (KAZ); Zhibek Kulambayeva (KAZ)	3	2
7	Zhang Tianhui (CHN); Jiang Xinyu (CHN)	6	6
Kai Thompson (HKG); Eudice Chong (HKG)	6	4	[13]
Shin Woo-bin (KOR); Ku Yeon-woo (KOR)	2	6	[11]
Francis Alcantara (PHI); Shaira Rivera (PHI)	4	4
5	Yusuke Kusuhara (JPN); Shuko Aoyama (JPN)	6	6

Quarterfinals
1	Ray Ho (TPE); Chan Hao-ching (TPE)	3	6	[14]
7	Zhang Tianhui (CHN); Jiang Xinyu (CHN)	6	2	[16]
Kai Thompson (HKG); Eudice Chong (HKG)	5	2
5	Yusuke Kusuhara (JPN); Shuko Aoyama (JPN)	7	6

Semifinals
7	Zhang Tianhui (CHN); Jiang Xinyu (CHN)	4	3
5	Yusuke Kusuhara (JPN); Shuko Aoyama (JPN)	6	6

=== Bottom half ===
First round
6	Wong Tsz Fu (HKG); Cody Wong (HKG)	6^{5}	6	[9]
Maxim Shin (UZB); Sevil Yuldasheva (UZB)	7^{7}	0	[11]
Alexander Shevchenko (KAZ); Anna Danilina (KAZ)	6	7
Aisam-ul-Haq Qureshi (PAK); Mahin Aftab Qureshi (PAK)	3	5
Akhmaddzhon Kosimi (TJK); Shakhzoda Asimova (TJK)	0	1
Jay Friend (JPN); Ena Shibahara (JPN)	6	6
Shin San-hui (KOR); Lee Eun-hye (KOR)	4	6	[12]
3	Pruchya Isaro (THA); Peangtarn Plipuech (THA)	6	1	[10]
8	Christopher Rungkat (INA); Aldila Sutjiadi (INA)	6	6
Nisan Shrestha (NEP); Swastika Bista (NEP)	1	1
Wu Yibing (CHN); Guo Hanyu (CHN)	6	6
Mönkhbaataryn Badrakh (MGL); Chogsomjavyn Maralgoo (MGL)	0	4
Ali Yazdani (IRI); Mandegar Farzami (IRI)	1	2
Tseng Chun-hsin (TPE); Hsieh Su-wei (TPE)	6	6

Second round
Maxim Shin (UZB); Sevil Yuldasheva (UZB)	1	5
Alexander Shevchenko (KAZ); Anna Danilina (KAZ)	6	7
Jay Friend (JPN); Ena Shibahara (JPN)	7	6
Shin San-hui (KOR); Lee Eun-hye (KOR)	5	1
8	Christopher Rungkat (INA); Aldila Sutjiadi (INA)	6^{3}	3
Wu Yibing (CHN); Guo Hanyu (CHN)	7^{7}	6
Tseng Chun-hsin (TPE); Hsieh Su-wei (TPE)	6	6
2	Yuki Bhambri (IND); Rutuja Bhosale (IND)	3	4

Quarterfinals
Alexander Shevchenko (KAZ); Anna Danilina (KAZ)	3	5
Jay Friend (JPN); Ena Shibahara (JPN)	6	7
Wu Yibing (CHN); Guo Hanyu (CHN)	2	4
Tseng Chun-hsin (TPE); Hsieh Su-wei (TPE)	6	6

Semifinals
Jay Friend (JPN); Ena Shibahara (JPN)	6	6^{6}	[10]
Tseng Chun-hsin (TPE); Hsieh Su-wei (TPE)	1	7^{8}	[5]
