= 2020 Billie Jean King Cup Asia/Oceania Zone Group II – Pool B (Wellington) =

Subsection of tennis competition

Pool B (Wellington) of the 2020–21 Billie Jean King Cup Asia/Oceania Zone Group II was one of four pools in the Asia/Oceania zone of the 2020–21 Billie Jean King Cup. Four teams competed in a round robin competition, with the top team and the bottom teams proceeding to their respective sections of the play-offs: the top team played for advancement to Group I.

== Standings ==
		PHI	THA	GUM	TKM	RR; W–L	Set; W–L	Game; W–L	Standings
4	Philippines		2–1	3–0	3–0	8–1	16–3 (84%)	106–50 (68%)	1
2	Thailand	1–2		3–0	3–0	7–2	15–4 (79%)	104–46 (69%)	2
7	Guam	0–3	0–3		3–0	3–6	6–12 (33%)	54–89 (38%)	3
6	Turkmenistan	0–3	0–3	0–3		0–9	0–18 (0%)	31–110 (22%)	4

Standings are determined by: 1. number of wins; 2. number of matches; 3. in two-team ties, head-to-head records; 4. in three-team ties, (a) percentage of matches won (head-to-head records if two teams remain tied), then (b) percentage of sets won (head-to-head records if two teams remain tied), then (c) percentage of games won (head-to-head records if two teams remain tied), then (d) Billie Jean King Cup rankings.

== Round-robin ==
=== Thailand vs. Turkmenistan ===
Thailand
3
Renouf Tennis Centre, Wellington, New Zealand
4 February 2020
Hard

Turkmenistan
0

			1	2	3
1	(Thailand) (Turkmenistan)	Anchisa Chanta; Arzuv Klycheva	6; 2	6; 1
2	(Thailand) (Turkmenistan)	Chompoothip Jundakate; Bahar Toymyradova	6; 0	6; 1
3	(Thailand) (Turkmenistan)	Tamachan Momkoonthod / Watsachol Sawatdee; Rozhan Karajayeva / Arzuv Klycheva	6; 1	6; 1

=== Philippines vs. Guam ===
Philippines
3
Renouf Tennis Centre, Wellington, New Zealand
4 February 2020
Hard

Guam
0

			1	2	3
1	(Philippines) (Guam)	Anna Clarice Patrimonio; Katrina Lai	6; 3	6; 2
2	(Philippines) (Guam)	Marian Capadocia; Nadine Del Carmen	6; 0	6; 4
3	(Philippines) (Guam)	Marian Capadocia / Shaira Hope Rivera; Nadine Del Carmen / Katrina Lai	6; 0	6; 1

=== Turkmenistan vs. Guam ===
Turkmenistan
0
Renouf Tennis Centre, Wellington, New Zealand
5 February 2020
Hard

Guam
3

			1	2	3
1	(Turkmenistan) (Guam)	Arzuv Klycheva; Katrina Lai	2; 6	1; 6
2	(Turkmenistan) (Guam)	Bahar Toymyradova; Nadine Del Carmen	3; 6	6^{3} 7^{7}
3	(Turkmenistan) (Guam)	Rozhan Karajayeva / Arzuv Klycheva; Nadine Del Carmen / Katrina Lai	5; 7	0; 6

=== Thailand vs. Philippines ===
Thailand
1
Renouf Tennis Centre, Wellington, New Zealand
6 February 2020
Hard

Philippines
2

			1	2	3
1	(Thailand) (Philippines)	Anchisa Chanta; Anna Clarice Patrimonio	6; 1	6; 4
2	(Thailand) (Philippines)	Chompoothip Jundakate; Marian Capadocia	3; 6	3; 6
3	(Thailand) (Philippines)	Watsachol Sawatdee / Tamarine Tanasugarn; Marian Capadocia / Shaira Hope Rivera	2; 6	6; 4	6^{3} 7^{7}

=== Thailand vs. Guam ===
Thailand
3
Renouf Tennis Centre, Wellington, New Zealand
7 February 2020
Hard

Guam
0

			1	2	3
1	(Thailand) (Guam)	Tamachan Momkoonthod; Katrina Lai	6; 0	6; 0
2	(Thailand) (Guam)	Watsachol Sawatdee; Nadine Del Carmen	6; 2	6; 3
3	(Thailand) (Guam)	Tamachan Momkoonthod / Tamarine Tanasugarn; Nadine Del Carmen / Charlayne Espinosa	6; 0	6; 1

=== Philippines vs. Turkmenistan ===
Philippines
3
Renouf Tennis Centre, Wellington, New Zealand
7 February 2020
Hard

Turkmenistan
0

			1	2	3
1	(Philippines) (Turkmenistan)	Shaira Hope Rivera; Rozhan Karajayeva	6; 2	6; 0
2	(Philippines) (Turkmenistan)	Anna Clarice Patrimonio; Arzuv Klycheva	6; 1	6; 2
3	(Philippines) (Turkmenistan)	Marian Capadocia / Shaira Hope Rivera; Arzuv Klycheva / Bahar Toymyradova	6; 1	6; 2
