= Tennis at the 2026 Asian Games – Women's singles =

Women's singles at the 2026 Asian Games
- Venue: Higashiyama Park Tennis Center
- Dates: 27 September – 2 October 2026
- Competitors: 30 from 15 nations

Medalists
gold medal	Wang Xiyu	China
silver medal	Zhang Shuai	China
bronze medal	Alexandra Eala	Philippines
bronze medal	Yulia Putintseva	Kazakhstan

Women's singles
- Tennis at the 2026 Asian Games

Events
Singles	men	women
Doubles	men	women	mixed
- Asian Games

The women's singles tennis event at the 2026 Asian Games took place at the Higashiyama Park Tennis Center, Nagoya, Aichi Prefecture, Japan from 27 September to 2 October 2026.

Wang Xiyu defeated Zhang Shuai 6–2, 6–1 in the final to win the gold medal. Her victory made her the sixth consecutive Chinese woman to win gold in women's singles. This marked the third consecutive final between two Chinese women. Wang's victory earned her qualification for the 2028 Los Angeles Olympics.

Thirty players from 15 countries participated in the event. Zheng Qinwen was the defending champion, but chose to compete in the 2026 China Open instead.

== Schedule ==
All times are Japan Standard Time (UTC+09:00)

Date	Time	Event
Sunday, 27 September 2026	10:00	First round
Monday, 28 September 2026	12:30	Second round
Tuesday, 29 September 2026	10:00	Second round
Wednesday, 30 September 2026	11:00	Quarterfinals
Thursday, 1 October 2026	11:00	Semifinals
Friday, 2 October 2026	14:30	Gold medal match

== Results ==
Legend

- r — Retired

=== Final ===
Gold medal match
4	Wang Xiyu (CHN)	6	6
2	Zhang Shuai (CHN)	2	1

=== Top half ===
First round
Patcharin Cheapchandej (THA)	6	6
Mahin Aftab Qureshi (PAK)	1	1
Sevil Yuldasheva (UZB)	5	3
Mandegar Farzami (IRI)	7	6
Chogsomjavyn Martaa (MGL)	0	0
8	Joanna Garland (TPE)	6	6
4	Wang Xiyu (CHN)	6	6
Anjali Kirana Junarto (INA)	0	0
Sonja Zhiyenbayeva (KAZ)	6	7
Adithya Karunaratne (HKG)	1	5
Anastasiya Tursunova (TJK)	0	0
Ku Yeon-woo (KOR)	6	6
Swastika Bista (NEP)	1	1
6	Moyuka Uchijima (JPN)	6	6

Second round
1	Alexandra Eala (PHI)	6	6
Patcharin Cheapchandej (THA)	1	0
Mandegar Farzami (IRI)	1	1
8	Joanna Garland (TPE)	6	6
4	Wang Xiyu (CHN)	6	4	6
Sonja Zhiyenbayeva (KAZ)	1	6	1
Ku Yeon-woo (KOR)	6	3	6^{2}
6	Moyuka Uchijima (JPN)	4	6	7^{7}

Quarterfinals
1	Alexandra Eala (PHI)	7	6
8	Joanna Garland (TPE)	5	0
4	Wang Xiyu (CHN)	6	3	6
6	Moyuka Uchijima (JPN)	4	6	1

Semifinals
1	Alexandra Eala (PHI)	6	3	2
4	Wang Xiyu (CHN)	3	6	6

=== Bottom half ===
First round
5	Mananchaya Sawangkaew (THA)	6	6
Chogsomjavyn Maralgoo (MGL)	4	2
Shek Cheuk Ying (HKG)	2
Daria Shubina (UZB)	0^{r}
Meydiana Laviola Reinnamah (INA)	0	0
Yang Ya-yi (TPE)	6	6
Ushna Suhail (PAK)	1	0
3	Yulia Putintseva (KAZ)	6	6
7	Himeno Sakatsume (JPN)	6	6
Tennielle Madis (PHI)	1	0
Back Da-yeon (KOR)	6	6
Shivali Gurung (NEP)	1	0
Meshkatolzahra Safi (IRI)	6	6
Shakhzoda Asimova (TJK)	0	1

Second round
5	Mananchaya Sawangkaew (THA)	7	6
Shek Cheuk Ying (HKG)	5	3
Yang Ya-yi (TPE)	3	1
3	Yulia Putintseva (KAZ)	6	6
7	Himeno Sakatsume (JPN)	7	6
Back Da-yeon (KOR)	5	0
Meshkatolzahra Safi (IRI)	1	0
2	Zhang Shuai (CHN)	6	6

Quarterfinals
5	Mananchaya Sawangkaew (THA)	3	0
3	Yulia Putintseva (KAZ)	6	6
7	Himeno Sakatsume (JPN)	4	3
2	Zhang Shuai (CHN)	6	6

Semifinals
3	Yulia Putintseva (KAZ)	4	2
2	Zhang Shuai (CHN)	6	6
