= Tennis at the 2026 Asian Games – Men's doubles =

Men's doubles at the 2026 Asian Games
- Venue: Higashiyama Park Tennis Center
- Dates: 27 September – 2 October 2026
- Competitors: 54 from 16 nations

Medalists
gold medal	Yusuke Kusuhara; Shunsuke Nakagawa	Japan
silver medal	Nam Ji-sung; Park Ui-sung	South Korea
bronze medal	Jiang Fumin; Zhang Tianhui	China
bronze medal	Ray Ho; Hsu Yu-hsiou	Chinese Taipei

Men's doubles
- Tennis at the 2026 Asian Games

Events
Singles	men	women
Doubles	men	women	mixed
- Asian Games

The men's doubles tennis event at the 2026 Asian Games took place at the Higashiyama Park Tennis Center, Nagoya, Aichi Prefecture, Japan from 27 September to 2 October 2026. Fifty-four players from 16 countries participated in the event.

Yusuke Kusuhara and Shunsuke Nakagawa defeated Nam Ji-sung and Park Ui-sung 6–3, 7–6^{4} to win gold in men's doubles. It was Japan's first gold medal in the event for 54 years.

== Schedule ==
All times are Japan Standard Time (UTC+09:00)

Date	Time	Event
Sunday, 27 September 2026	10:00	First round
Monday, 28 September 2026	17:00	First round
Tuesday, 29 September 2026	14:30	Second round
Wednesday, 30 September 2023	14:00	Quarterfinals
Thursday, 1 October 2023	12:00	Semifinals
Friday, 2 October 2023	11:00	Gold medal match

== Results ==
=== Final ===
Gold medal match
4	Yusuke Kusuhara (JPN); Shunsuke Nakagawa (JPN)	6	7^{7}
2	Nam Ji-sung (KOR); Park Ui-sung (KOR)	3	6^{4}

=== Top half ===
First round
Mönkhbaataryn Badrakh (MGL); Örnökhiin Zolbadar (MGL)	2	6	[12]
Abhishek Bastola (NEP); Pradip Khadka (NEP)	6	4	[14]
Jiang Fumin (CHN); Zhang Tianhui (CHN)	6	6
Kasra Rahmani (IRI); Ali Yazdani (IRI)	4	4
Shodmon Kurbonov (TJK); Issamjon Sharifov (TJK)	1	1
8	Pawit Sornlaksup (THA); Wishaya Trongcharoenchaikul (THA)	6	6
Hong Seong-chan (KOR); Kwon Soon-woo (KOR)	7	6
Muzammil Murtaza (PAK); Aisam-ul-Haq Qureshi (PAK)	5	4
Alexander Shevchenko (KAZ); Timofey Skatov (KAZ)	6	6
Jack Cheng (HKG); Tam Sin Hang (HKG)	3	2
Sergey Fomin (UZB); Khumoyun Sultanov (UZB)	4	6	[10]
7	Huang Tsung-hao (TPE); Wu Tung-lin (TPE)	6	3	[3]

Second round
1	Anirudh Chandrasekar (IND); Sriram Balaji (IND)	6	6
Abhishek Bastola (NEP); Pradip Khadka (NEP)	2	1
Jiang Fumin (CHN); Zhang Tianhui (CHN)	7^{7}	3	[10]
8	Pawit Sornlaksup (THA); Wishaya Trongcharoenchaikul (THA)	6^{1}	6	[5]
4	Yusuke Kusuhara (JPN); Shunsuke Nakagawa (JPN)	6^{6}	7	[10]
Hong Seong-chan (KOR); Kwon Soon-woo (KOR)	7^{8}	5	[5]
Alexander Shevchenko (KAZ); Timofey Skatov (KAZ)	6	6
Sergey Fomin (UZB); Khumoyun Sultanov (UZB)	4	2

Quarterfinals
1	Anirudh Chandrasekar (IND); Sriram Balaji (IND)	7^{7}	6^{7}	[8]
Jiang Fumin (CHN); Zhang Tianhui (CHN)	6^{4}	7^{9}	[10]
4	Yusuke Kusuhara (JPN); Shunsuke Nakagawa (JPN)	6	6
Alexander Shevchenko (KAZ); Timofey Skatov (KAZ)	3	4

Semifinals
Jiang Fumin (CHN); Zhang Tianhui (CHN)	4	6	[6]
4	Yusuke Kusuhara (JPN); Shunsuke Nakagawa (JPN)	6	0	[10]

=== Bottom half ===
First round
Denis Yevseyev (KAZ); Beibit Zhukayev (KAZ)	6	6
Cheng Siu Chi (HKG); Wong Tsz Fu (HKG)	1	3
Davaadashiin Mandakh (MGL); Enkhjargalyn Sonompuntsag (MGL)	2	0
Aqeel Khan (PAK); Muhammad Shoaib (PAK)	6	6
6	Pruchya Isaro (THA); Maximus Jones (THA)	7	7^{7}
Kong Weiyi (CHN); Meng Fanming (CHN)	5	6^{3}
Lucky Candra Kurniawan (INA); Gunawan Trismuwantara (INA)	6	7^{8}
Mohammad Al-Kotop (JOR); Zaid Al-Mashni (JOR)	3	6^{6}
Akhmaddzhon Kosimi (TJK); Sobir Saidov (TJK)	0	1
Jay Friend (JPN); Kokoro Isomura (JPN)	6	6

Second round
5	Yuki Bhambri (IND); Dhakshineswar Suresh (IND)	6	7
Denis Yevseyev (KAZ); Beibit Zhukayev (KAZ)	1	5
Aqeel Khan (PAK); Muhammad Shoaib (PAK)	3	2
3	Ray Ho (TPE); Hsu Yu-hsiou (TPE)	6	6
6	Pruchya Isaro (THA); Maximus Jones (THA)	6	6
Lucky Candra Kurniawan (INA); Gunawan Trismuwantara (INA)	2	4
Jay Friend (JPN); Kokoro Isomura (JPN)	6	4	[6]
2	Nam Ji-sung (KOR); Park Ui-sung (KOR)	0	6	[10]

Quarterfinals
5	Yuki Bhambri (IND); Dhakshineswar Suresh (IND)	6^{5}	3
3	Ray Ho (TPE); Hsu Yu-hsiou (TPE)	7^{7}	6
6	Pruchya Isaro (THA); Maximus Jones (THA)	2	3
2	Nam Ji-sung (KOR); Park Ui-sung (KOR)	6	6

Semifinals
3	Ray Ho (TPE); Hsu Yu-hsiou (TPE)	6^{3}	6	[9]
2	Nam Ji-sung (KOR); Park Ui-sung (KOR)	7^{7}	2	[11]
