= Tennis at the 2026 Asian Games – Men's singles =

Men's singles at the 2026 Asian Games
- Venue: Higashiyama Park Tennis Center
- Dates: 27 September – 3 October 2026
- Competitors: 33 from 17 nations

Medalists
gold medal	Coleman Wong	Hong Kong
silver medal	Wu Yibing	China
bronze medal	Khumoyun Sultanov	Uzbekistan
bronze medal	Hayato Matsuoka	Japan

Men's singles
- Tennis at the 2026 Asian Games

Events
Singles	men	women
Doubles	men	women	mixed
- Asian Games

The men's singles tennis event at the 2026 Asian Games is one of the events of the tennis competition at the 20th Asian Games. It is being held from 27 September to 3 October 2026 at the Aichi Higashiyama Park Tennis Center in Nagoya, Japan, on outdoor hardcourts.

Coleman Wong defeated Wu Yibing 6–2, 6–4 in the final to win the gold medal. By winning gold, Wong earned direct qualification for the 2028 Los Angeles Olympics.

Zhang Zhizhen was the defending champion, but chose to compete in Beijing instead.

== Schedule ==
All times are Japan Standard Time (UTC+09:00)

Date	Time	Event
Sunday, 27 September 2026	10:00	First round
Monday, 28 September 2026	12:30	Second round
Tuesday, 29 September 2026	10:00	Second round
Wednesday, 30 September 2023	10:00	Third round
Thursday, 1 October 2023	12:00	Quarterfinals
Friday, 2 October 2023	10:30	Semifinals
Saturday, 3 October 2023	10:30	Gold medal match

== Results ==
Legend

- r — Retired

=== Finals ===
Semifinals					Gold medal match
1	Coleman Wong (HKG)	3	6	6
14	Khumoyun Sultanov (UZB)	6	3	2	1	Coleman Wong (HKG)	6	6
3	Wu Yibing (CHN)	6	6		3	Wu Yibing (CHN)	2	4
8	Hayato Matsuoka (JPN)	3	2

=== Top half ===
==== Section 1 ====
First round
Zaid Al-Mashni (JOR)	6	6
Muzammil Murtaza (PAK)	3	2

Second round
1	Coleman Wong (HKG)	6	6
Zaid Al-Mashni (JOR)	4	1
Fares Al-Wazer (YEM)	0	0
13	Yosuke Watanuki (JPN)	6	6
12	Kasidit Samrej (THA)	6	6
Pradip Khadka (NEP)	2	2
Kasra Rahmani (IRI)	6	3	3
5	Timofey Skatov (KAZ)	2	6	6

Third round
1	Coleman Wong (HKG)	7^{7}	6
13	Yosuke Watanuki (JPN)	6^{1}	3
12	Kasidit Samrej (THA)	6	7^{8}
5	Timofey Skatov (KAZ)	2	6^{6}

Quarterfinals
1	Coleman Wong (HKG)	6	6
12	Kasidit Samrej (THA)	3	0

==== Section 2 ====
First round

Second round
4	Kwon Soon-woo (KOR)	6	6
Pürevdorjiin Undrakh (MGL)	0	0
Meng Fanming (CHN)	1	4
14	Khumoyun Sultanov (UZB)	6	6
11	Dhakshineswar Suresh (IND)	7	7^{7}
Gunawan Trismuwantara (INA)	5	6^{2}
Anvar Rakhmatov (TJK)	0	1
6	Tseng Chun-hsin (TPE)	6	6

Third round
4	Kwon Soon-woo (KOR)	0^{r}
14	Khumoyun Sultanov (UZB)	3
11	Dhakshineswar Suresh (IND)	3	4
6	Tseng Chun-hsin (TPE)	6	6

Quarterfinals
14	Khumoyun Sultanov (UZB)	7^{8}	6
6	Tseng Chun-hsin (TPE)	6^{6}	2

=== Bottom half ===
==== Section 3 ====
First round

Second round
7	Sumit Nagal (IND)	6	6
Hong Seong-chan (KOR)	4	0
Somon Amonov (TJK)	1	1
9	Sergey Fomin (UZB)	6	6
16	Muhammad Rifqi Fitriadi (INA)	6	6
Muhammad Shoaib (PAK)	4	4
Ali Yazdani (IRI)	1	1
3	Wu Yibing (CHN)	6	6

Third round
7	Sumit Nagal (IND)	6	6
9	Sergey Fomin (UZB)	3	2
16	Muhammad Rifqi Fitriadi (INA)	1	2
3	Wu Yibing (CHN)	6	6

Quarterfinals
7	Sumit Nagal (IND)	4	4
3	Wu Yibing (CHN)	6	6

==== Section 4 ====
First round

Second round
8	Hayato Matsuoka (JPN)	7^{7}	6
Kai Thompson (HKG)	6^{2}	1
Mohammad Al-Kotop (JOR)	6	1	2
10	Hsu Yu-hsiou (TPE)	4	6	6
15	Maximus Jones (THA)	6	6
Örnökhiin Zolbadar (MGL)	0	0
Abhishek Bastola (NEP)	2	2
2	Alexander Shevchenko (KAZ)	6	6

Third round
8	Hayato Matsuoka (JPN)	2	6	7
10	Hsu Yu-hsiou (TPE)	6	4	5
15	Maximus Jones (THA)	1	4
2	Alexander Shevchenko (KAZ)	6	6

Quarterfinals
8	Hayato Matsuoka (JPN)	3	6	6
2	Alexander Shevchenko (KAZ)	6	2	0
