= 2020–21 Billie Jean King Cup Asia/Oceania Zone =

Subsection of tennis competition

The Asia/Oceania Zone is one of three zones of regional competition in the 2020–21 Billie Jean King Cup.

== Group I ==
- Venue: Aviation Club Tennis Centre, Dubai, United Arab Emirates (hard)
- Date: 3–7 March 2020

The six teams competed in one pool, with the teams finishing 1st and 2nd place in the pool advancing to the play-offs. The nations finishing 5th and 6th in the pool were relegated to Group II for 2022. The event was moved and postponed a month from Dongguan, China to Dubai due to the COVID-19 pandemic.

=== Seeding ===
Pot	Nation	Rank^{1}	Seed
1	China	22	1
1	South Korea	30	2
1	Chinese Taipei	34	3
1	Uzbekistan	35	4
1	India	36	5
1	Indonesia	37	6

- ^{1}Billie Jean King Cup Rankings as of 11 November 2019

=== Pool ===
	Pool A	CHN	IND	KOR	INA	TPE	UZB
1	China (5–0)		3–0	3–0	3–0	3–0	2–1
2	India (4–1)	0–3		2–1	2–1	2–1	3–0
3	South Korea (2–3)	0–3	1–2		2–1	1–2	3–0
4	Indonesia (2–3)	0–3	1–2	1–2		2–1	3–0
5	Chinese Taipei (2–3)	0–3	1–2	2–1	1–2		2–1
6	Uzbekistan (0–5)	1–2	0–3	0–3	0–3	1–2	

- China and India were promoted to the 2020 Billie Jean King Cup play-offs.
- Chinese Taipei and Uzbekistan were relegated to Asia/Oceania Zone Group II in 2022.

== Group II ==
- Venue 1: Renouf Tennis Centre, Wellington, New Zealand (hard)
- Venue 2: ~~Sri Lanka Tennis Association Complex, Colombo, Sri Lanka (clay)~~
- Dates: 4–8 February 2020 (Wellington)

The eighteen teams will compete across two different venues, with 10 nations taking part in Colombo, and 8 nations taking part in Wellington. In Colombo, ten teams will compete across 2 pools (Pools A & B). The winners of each pool will play-off to determine which nation will advance to Asia/Oceania Group I in 2022. In Wellington, eight teams will compete across two Pools of 4 teams (Pools A & B). The winners of each pool will play-off to determine which nation will advance to Asia/Oceania Group I in 2022.

Due to COVID-19 restrictions, the event in Sri Lanka could not be held. The Billie Jean King Cup committee has decided that in light of the challenges of identifying and appointing a new host nation during the remainder of the 2021 tennis season, the event will no longer take place in 2021. The seven competing nations, Hong Kong China, Iran, Malaysia, Oman, Sri Lanka, Tajikistan and Vietnam, will remain in Asia/Oceania Group II, where they will compete in the 2022 competition.

=== Seeding ===
Wellington

Pot	Nation	Rank^{1}	Seed
1	Singapore	47	1
1	Thailand	48	2
2	New Zealand	54	3
2	Philippines	58	4
3	Pakistan	74	5
3	Turkmenistan	92	6
4	Guam	NR	7
4	Mongolia	NR	8

- ^{1}Billie Jean King Cup Rankings as of 11 November 2019

=== Pools ===
	Pool A (Wellington)	NZL	PAK	MGL	SGP
1	New Zealand (3–0)		3–0	3–0	3–0
2	Pakistan (2–1)	0–3		2–1	2–1
3	Mongolia (1–2)	0–3	1–2		2–1
4	Singapore (0–3)	0–3	1–2	1–2	

	Pool B (Wellington)	PHI	THA	GUM	TKM
1	Philippines (3–0)		2–1	3–0	3–0
2	Thailand (2–1)	1–2		3–0	3–0
3	Guam (1–2)	0–3	0–3		3–0
4	Turkmenistan (0–3)	0–3	0–3	0–3	

=== Play-offs ===
Placing (Wellington)	A Team	Score	B Team
Promotional	New Zealand	2–1	Philippines
3rd–4th	Pakistan	0–3	Thailand
5th–6th	Mongolia	0–3	Guam
7th–8th	Singapore	2–0	Turkmenistan

=== Final placements ===
Placing	Teams
Promoted/First	New Zealand
Second	Philippines
Third	Thailand
Fourth	Pakistan
Fifth	Guam
Sixth	Mongolia
Seventh	Singapore
Eighth	Turkmenistan

- New Zealand was promoted to Asia/Oceania Zone Group I in 2022.
