= Tennis at the 2026 Asian Games =

- Venue: Higashiyama Park Tennis Center
- Dates: 27 September – 3 October 2026
- Competitors: 139 from 18 nations

The tennis tournaments at the 2026 Asian Games was held between 27 September and 3 October 2026 at Higashiyama Park Tennis Center.

The men's and women's singles events served as a qualification for the 2028 Summer Olympics in Los Angeles.

== Schedule ==
P	Preliminary rounds	¼	Quarterfinals	½	Semifinals	F	Final

Event↓/Date →	27th Sun	28th Mon	29th Tue	30th Wed	1st Thu	2nd Fri	3rd Sat
Men's singles	P	P	P	P	¼	½	F
Men's doubles	P	P	P	¼	½	F	
Women's singles	P	P	P	¼	½	F	
Women's doubles		P	P	P	¼	½	F
Mixed doubles	P	P	P	P	¼	½	F

== Medalists ==
Event	Gold	Silver	Bronze
Men's singles details	Coleman Wong; Hong Kong	Wu Yibing; China	Khumoyun Sultanov; Uzbekistan
Men's singles details	Coleman Wong; Hong Kong	Wu Yibing; China	Hayato Matsuoka; Japan
Men's doubles	Japan; Yusuke Kusuhara; Shunsuke Nakagawa	South Korea; Nam Ji-sung; Park Ui-sung	China; Jiang Fumin; Zhang Tianhui
Men's doubles	Japan; Yusuke Kusuhara; Shunsuke Nakagawa	South Korea; Nam Ji-sung; Park Ui-sung	Chinese Taipei; Ray Ho; Hsu Yu-hsiou
Women's singles	Wang Xiyu; China	Zhang Shuai; China	Alexandra Eala; Philippines
Women's singles	Wang Xiyu; China	Zhang Shuai; China	Yulia Putintseva; Kazakhstan
Women's doubles	Chinese Taipei; Hsieh Su-wei; Liang En-shuo	Chinese Taipei; Chan Hao-ching; Wu Fang-hsien	Hong Kong; Eudice Chong; Cody Wong
Women's doubles	Chinese Taipei; Hsieh Su-wei; Liang En-shuo	Chinese Taipei; Chan Hao-ching; Wu Fang-hsien	Kazakhstan; Anna Danilina; Yulia Putintseva
Mixed doubles	Japan; Jay Friend; Ena Shibahara	Japan; Yusuke Kusuhara; Shuko Aoyama	China; Zhang Tianhui; Jiang Xinyu
Mixed doubles	Japan; Jay Friend; Ena Shibahara	Japan; Yusuke Kusuhara; Shuko Aoyama	Chinese Taipei; Tseng Chun-hsin; Hsieh Su-wei

== Medal table ==
Rank	Nation	Gold	Silver	Bronze	Total
1	Japan (JPN)	2	1	1	4
2	China (CHN)	1	2	2	5
3	Chinese Taipei (TPE)	1	1	2	4
4	Hong Kong (HKG)	1	0	1	2
5	South Korea (KOR)	0	1	0	1
6	Kazakhstan (KAZ)	0	0	2	2
7	Philippines (PHI)	0	0	1	1
7	Uzbekistan (UZB)	0	0	1	1
Totals (8 entries)		5	5	10	20

== Participating nations ==
A total of 139 athletes from 18 nations competed in tennis at the 2026 Asian Games:

- China (10)
- Chinese Taipei (11)
- Hong Kong (12)
- India (7)
- Indonesia (7)
- Iran (4)
- Japan (12)
- Jordan (2)
- Kazakhstan (8)
- Mongolia (10)
- Nepal (5)
- Pakistan (6)
- Philippines (5)
- South Korea (12)
- Tajikistan (11)
- Thailand (11)
- Uzbekistan (5)
- Yemen (1)
