= Tennis at the 2021 SEA Games =

- Venue: Hanaka Sports & Entertainment Center
- Location: Bắc Ninh, Vietnam
- Dates: 13–22 May 2022

Tennis was among the sports contested at the 2021 SEA Games and held at Hanaka Sports & Entertainment Center in Bắc Ninh, Vietnam. It took place from 13 to 22 May 2022. Seven events were featured for tennis namely: men's singles, women's singles, men's doubles, women's doubles, mixed doubles, men's team and women's team.

== Medal table ==
* Host nation (Vietnam)

Rank	Nation	Gold	Silver	Bronze	Total
1	Thailand	4	3	2	9
2	Vietnam*	1	2	3	6
3	Philippines	1	1	4	6
4	Indonesia	1	1	2	4
5	Malaysia	0	0	2	2
6	Laos	0	0	1	1
Totals (6 entries)		7	7	14	28

== Medalists ==
Event	Gold	Silver	Bronze
Men's singles	Lý Hoàng Nam; Vietnam	Trịnh Linh Giang; Vietnam	Mick Lescure Sadettan; Laos
Men's singles	Lý Hoàng Nam; Vietnam	Trịnh Linh Giang; Vietnam	Yuttana Charoenphon; Thailand
Women's singles	Luksika Kumkhum; Thailand	Anchisa Chanta; Thailand	Alexandra Eala; Philippines
Women's singles	Luksika Kumkhum; Thailand	Anchisa Chanta; Thailand	Chanelle Vân Nguyễn; Vietnam
Men's doubles	Philippines; Treat Huey; Ruben Gonzales	Philippines; Jeson Patrombon; Francis Alcantara	Vietnam; Trịnh Linh Giang; Phạm Minh Tuấn
Men's doubles	Philippines; Treat Huey; Ruben Gonzales	Philippines; Jeson Patrombon; Francis Alcantara	Vietnam; Lê Quốc Khánh; Nguyễn Văn Phương
Women's doubles	Thailand; Anchisa Chanta; Patcharin Cheapchandej	Thailand; Pimrada Jattavapornvanit; Lanlana Tararudee	Indonesia; Beatrice Gumulya; Jessy Rompies
Women's doubles	Thailand; Anchisa Chanta; Patcharin Cheapchandej	Thailand; Pimrada Jattavapornvanit; Lanlana Tararudee	Malaysia; Jawairiah Noordin; Sharifah Elysia Wan Abdul Rahman
Mixed doubles	Indonesia; Christopher Rungkat; Aldila Sutjiadi	Thailand; Patcharin Cheapchandej; Pruchya Isaro	Philippines; Alex Eala; Treat Huey
Mixed doubles	Indonesia; Christopher Rungkat; Aldila Sutjiadi	Thailand; Patcharin Cheapchandej; Pruchya Isaro	Thailand; Luksika Kumkhum; Kasidit Samrej
Men's team	Thailand; Yuttana Charoenphon; Kasidit Samrej; Pruchya Isaro; Thantub Suksumrarn	Indonesia; Christopher Rungkat; Rifqy Sukma; Muhammad Rifqi Fitriadi; Achad Imam Maruf	Malaysia; Syed Mohd Agil Syed Naguib; Hao Sheng Koay; Imran Daniel Abdul Hazli; Muhammad Aiman Hamdan
Men's team	Thailand; Yuttana Charoenphon; Kasidit Samrej; Pruchya Isaro; Thantub Suksumrarn	Indonesia; Christopher Rungkat; Rifqy Sukma; Muhammad Rifqi Fitriadi; Achad Imam Maruf	Philippines; Jeson Patrombon; Ruben Gonzales; Treat Huey; Eric Jr Olivarez
Women's team	Thailand; Patcharin Cheapchandej; Luksika Kumkhum; Pimrada Jattavapornvanit; Anchisa Chanta	Vietnam; Chanelle Vân Nguyễn; Savanna Lý-Nguyễn; Trần Thụy Thanh Trúc; Csilla Fodor	Indonesia; Aldila Sutjiadi; Beatrice Gumulya; Jessy Rompies; Novela Rezha Millenia Putri; Fitriani Sabatini
Women's team	Thailand; Patcharin Cheapchandej; Luksika Kumkhum; Pimrada Jattavapornvanit; Anchisa Chanta	Vietnam; Chanelle Vân Nguyễn; Savanna Lý-Nguyễn; Trần Thụy Thanh Trúc; Csilla Fodor	Philippines; Alex Eala; Shaira Rivera; Marian Capadocia; Jenaila Rose Prulla
