= Tamachan Momkoonthod =

Thai tennis player

Tamachan Momkoonthod ธมจันทร์ มอมขุนทด
- Country (sports): Thailand
- Born: 14 April 1997 (age 29) Ubon Ratchathani, Thailand
- Plays: Left (two-handed backhand)
- Prize money: $27,652

Singles
- Career record: 100–107
- Career titles: 0
- Highest ranking: No. 696 (18 April 2016)

Doubles
- Career record: 79–90
- Career titles: 4 ITF
- Highest ranking: No. 682 (23 July 2018)

Team competitions
- Fed Cup: 4–0

Tamachan Momkoonthod (Thai: ธมจันทร์ มอมขุนทด; born 14 April 1997) is an inactive Thai tennis player.

Momkoonthod has a career-high singles ranking by the Women's Tennis Association (WTA) of 696, achieved on 18 April 2016. She also has a career-high WTA doubles ranking of 682, reached on 23 July 2018. Momkoonthod has won four doubles titles at tournaments of the ITF Women's Circuit.

Momkoonthod also represented Thailand in Fed Cup competition.

== ITF Circuit finals ==
Legend
$25,000 tournaments
$15,000 tournaments
$10,000 tournaments

=== Doubles: 9 (4 titles, 5 runner-ups) ===
| Result | W–L | Date | Tournament | Tier | Surface | Partner | Opponents | Score |
|---|---|---|---|---|---|---|---|---|
| Loss | 0–1 | May 2015 | ITF Bangkok, Thailand | 10,000 | Hard | (Thailand) Plobrung Plipuech | (Australia) Nicole Collie (Australia) Deeon Mladin | 4–6, 3–6 |
| Loss | 0–2 | May 2016 | ITF Sharm El Sheikh, Egypt | 10,000 | Hard | (India) Pranjala Yadlapalli | (India) Prerna Bhambri (India) Nidhi Chilumula | 6–3, 5–7, [7–10] |
| Loss | 0–3 | Oct 2016 | ITF Hua Hin, Thailand | 10,000 | Hard | (Thailand) Chompoothip Jundakate | (Thailand) Nudnida Luangnam (Thailand) Varunya Wongteanchai | 2–6, 7–6^{(2)}, [0–10] |
| Loss | 0–4 | Aug 2017 | ITF Nonthaburi, Thailand | 15,000 | Hard | (India) Pranjala Yadlapalli | (Indonesia) Beatrice Gumulya (Indonesia) Jessy Rompies | 0–6, 6–7^{(5)} |
| Win | 1–4 | Aug 2017 | ITF Nonthaburi, Thailand | 15,000 | Hard | (Thailand) Varunya Wongteanchai | (Australia) Genevieve Lorbergs (Singapore) Stefanie Tan | 6–3, 6–4 |
| Win | 2–4 | Nov 2018 | ITF Nonthaburi, Thailand | 15,000 | Hard | (Thailand) Chompoothip Jundakate | (Netherlands) Suzan Lamens (Switzerland) Nina Stadler | 6–3, 6–4 |
| Loss | 2–5 | Sep 2019 | ITF Yeongwol, South Korea | W15 | Hard | (Thailand) Watsachol Sawatdee | (South Korea) Hong Seung-yeon (South Korea) Kim Na-ri | 7–5, 6–7^{(5)}, [9–11] |
| Win | 3–5 | Oct 2019 | ITF Hua Hin, Thailand | W15 | Hard | (Thailand) Watsachol Sawatdee | (Thailand) Patcharin Cheapchandej (China) Ni Ma Zhuoma | 7–5, 6–3 |
| Win | 4–5 | Jun 2022 | ITF Chiang Rai, Thailand | W15 | Hard | (Thailand) Chompoothip Jundakate | (Thailand) Anchisa Chanta (Thailand) Patcharin Cheapchandej | w/o |
