= Sonja Zhiyenbayeva =

Kazakhstani tennis player (born 2006)

- Country (sports): Kazakhstan (2024–present); Germany (2022–2024)
- Born: July 2, 2006 (age 20) Almaty, Kazakhstan
- Plays: Right (two-handed backhand)
- College: Pepperdine Waves
- Prize money: $41,215

Singles
- Career record: 55–38
- Career titles: 4 ITF
- Highest ranking: No. 382 (14 September 2026)
- Current ranking: No. 394 (26 October 2026)

Doubles
- Career record: 36–32
- Career titles: 1 ITF
- Highest ranking: No. 376 (12 October 2026)
- Current ranking: No. 380 (26 October 2026)
- Last updated on: 26 October 2026.

Sonja Zhiyenbayeva (born 2 July 2006) is a Kazakh tennis player. She achieved career-high WTA rankings of No. 382 in singles and No. 376 in doubles.

Zhiyenbayeva played college tennis at Pepperdine University.

== Early life ==
Born in Almaty, Sonia has a Kazakh mother and a German father. Sonia moved to Germany with her family at a very young age. She acquired Kazakh citizenship in 2024.

== Career ==
In September 2024, she won the W15 singles tournament in Madrid.

In November 2025, she and American Savannah Broadushas won the women's doubles final at the W50 event in Austin, defeating American pairing of Victoria Osuigwe and Alana Smith. It was Zhiyenbayeva's first ITF World Tennis Tour doubles title.

In August 2026, she defeated Bulgarian player Isabella Shinikova in three sets in the final of the W75 event in Ourense, Spain, the biggest title of her career thus far.

== ITF Circuit finals ==
=== Singles: 5 (4 titles, 1 runner-up) ===
| Legend W75 tournaments W35 tournaments W15 tournaments | Finals by surface Hard (3–1) Clay (1–0) |

| Result | W–L | Date | Tournament | Tier | Surface | Opponent | Score |
|---|---|---|---|---|---|---|---|
| Win | 1–0 | Apr 2024 | ITF Antalya, Turkiye | W15 | Clay | (Turkey) İlay Yörük | 7–6^{(4)}, 6–4 |
| Loss | 1–1 | Aug 2024 | ITF Ust-Kamenogorsk, Kazakhstan | W15 | Hard | Alisa Kummel | 6–7^{(1)}, 3–6 |
| Win | 2–1 | Sep 2024 | ITF Madrid, Spain | W15 | Hard | (United Kingdom) Alice Gillan | 6–1, 5–7, 6–1 |
| Win | 3–1 | Aug 2026 | ITF Ourense, Spain | W75 | Hard | (Bulgaria) Isabella Shinikova | 7–6^{(2)}, 3–6, 6–1 |
| Win | 4–1 | Aug 2026 | ITF Vigo, Spain | W35 | Hard | (China) Ren Yufei | 7–6^{(6)}, 7–5 |

=== Doubles: 4 (1 title, 3 runner-ups) ===
| Legend W50 tournaments W35 tournaments W15 tournaments | Finals by surface Hard (1–2) Clay (0–1) |

| Result | W–L | Date | Tournament | Tier | Surface | Partner | Opponent | Score |
|---|---|---|---|---|---|---|---|---|
| Loss | 0–1 | Apr 2023 | ITF Antalya, Turkey | W15 | Clay | (Turkey) Başak Eraydın | (Germany) Katharina Hering (Germany) Natalia Siedliska | 3–6, 2–6 |
| Win | 1–1 | Nov 2025 | ITF Austin, United States | W50 | Hard | (United States) Savannah Broadus | (United States) Victoria Osuigwe (United States) Alana Smith | 6–3, 6–3 |
| Loss | 1–2 | Jun 2026 | ITF Zhengzhou, China | W35 | Hard | Ekaterina Yashina | (China) Huang Yujia (China) Zheng Wushuang | 3–6, 2–6 |
| Loss | 1–3 | Aug 2026 | ITF Vigo, Spain | W35 | Hard | Ekaterina Yashina | (Spain) Victoria Gómez O'Hayon (Netherlands) Arantxa Rus | 3–6, 4–6 |
