= Alexandra Eala =

Filipino tennis player (born 2005)

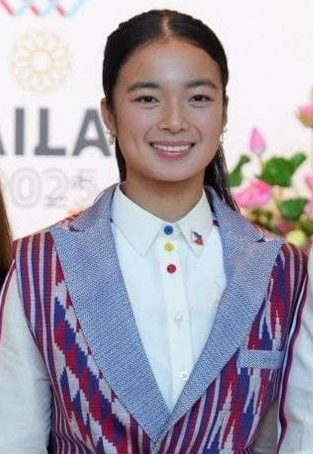
- Eala at the 2025 SEA Games
- Full name: Alexandra Maniego Eala
- Country (sports): Philippines
- Born: May 23, 2005 (age 21) Quezon City, Philippines
- Height: 1.75 m (5 ft 9 in)
- Turned pro: March 2020
- Plays: Left-handed (two-handed backhand)
- Coach: Joan Bosch
- Prize money: US$3,335,990

Singles
- Career record: 235–141
- Career titles: 1
- Highest ranking: No. 15 (November 9, 2026)
- Current ranking: No. 15 (November 9, 2026)

Grand Slam singles results
- Australian Open: 1R (2026)
- French Open: 1R (2025, 2026)
- Wimbledon: 4R (2026)
- US Open: 3R (2026)

Doubles
- Career record: 49–50
- Career titles: 0
- Highest ranking: No. 88 (May 4, 2026)
- Current ranking: No. 121 (September 14, 2026)

Grand Slam doubles results
- Australian Open: 1R (2026)
- French Open: 2R (2025)
- Wimbledon: 1R (2025, 2026)

Grand Slam mixed doubles results
- US Open: 1R (2026)

Medal record
Women's tennis
Representing the Philippines
Event	1st	2nd	3rd
Asian Games	0	0	3
Southeast Asian Games	1	0	5
Total	1	0	8
Asian Games
Bronze medal – third place	2026 Aichi–Nagoya	Singles
Bronze medal – third place	2022 Hangzhou	Singles
Bronze medal – third place	2022 Hangzhou	Mixed doubles
SEA Games
Gold medal – first place	2025 Thailand	Singles
Bronze medal – third place	2025 Thailand	Team
Bronze medal – third place	2025 Thailand	Mixed doubles
Bronze medal – third place	2021 Vietnam	Singles
Bronze medal – third place	2021 Vietnam	Mixed doubles
Bronze medal – third place	2021 Vietnam	Team
- Last updated on: September 14, 2026.

Alexandra Maniego Eala (Note: English: /iːˈɑːlɑː/ ee-AH-lah, Filipino pronunciation: [ʔɛˈjalɐ]) (born May 23, 2005) is a Filipino professional tennis player. She reached a career-high ranking of world No. 15 by the Women's Tennis Association (WTA) in November 2026, making her the highest ranking Filipino and Southeast Asian in WTA Tour history. She is the first Filipino to reach top 20, defeat top 10 opponents, reach the fourth round of a major, reach the semifinals of a WTA 1000 event, and win a WTA Tour title.

Eala reached a junior combined ranking of world No. 2 on October 6, 2020, and became the first Filipino to win a junior major title, winning the girls' singles title at the 2022 US Open. She rose to prominence when she defeated Iga Świątek en route to reaching the semifinals of the 2025 Miami Open as a wildcard, followed by her first WTA Tour final appearance at the Eastbourne Open. Following two WTA 125 titles (at the 2025 Guadalajara Open and the 2026 Birmingham Open), she reached the fourth round of the 2026 Wimbledon Championships. Eala had her breakthrough when she won her first WTA Tour title at the Washington Open, which propelled her into reaching the top 20 in the WTA rankings.

== Early life and background ==
Alexandra Maniego Eala was born on May 23, 2005, in Quezon City, Philippines, to Michael Eala, a business executive, and Rosemarie Maniego-Eala, Globe Telecom chief financial officer until 2024, and a former national swimmer and bronze medalist in the 100-meter backstroke at the 1985 SEA Games. Her paternal uncles are Noli Eala, former Philippine Sports Commission chairperson and Philippine Basketball Association commissioner, and fashion designer Rhett Eala. Her older brother, Michael Francis "Miko" Eala, played tennis for the Pennsylvania State University Nittany Lions from 2020 to 2024.

Eala began playing tennis at age four, introduced to the sport by her maternal grandfather, Roberto Maniego, who was also her first coach.

She attended the Immaculate Conception Academy in San Juan and Colegio San Agustin in Makati before joining the Rafa Nadal Academy in Manacor, Spain. She graduated from the academy in 2023.

== Junior years ==
In 2013, Eala won the U8 (Note: U8 means players who are 8 years old or younger and is used as an age group for junior competitions.) division of the Little Mo International Tennis Grand Slam Championship in Palm Beach Gardens, Florida, marking her first international junior success. In 2015, she captured the U11 (Note: U11 means players who are 11 years old or younger and is used as an age group for junior competitions.) title at the Dubrovnik Dub Bowl in Croatia. By 2017, Eala had risen to the top of the Asian Tennis Federation rankings and, alongside Priska Nugroho, was named Doubles Player of the Year by Tennis Europe. In 2018, she made history at Les Petits As in France, becoming the first wild card champion in the tournament's history, which earned a wildcard entry to the French Open juniors.

In 2019, she helped the Philippines qualify for the ITF World Junior Tennis Finals for the first time in 26 years. Later that year, she debuted at the US Open juniors, becoming the first Filipino to qualify for a junior major main draw since 1991, and capped the season with a doubles crown at the Orange Bowl International Tennis Championships in Florida. In 2020 she cracked the ITF World Juniors top 10, reaching No. 9 in the rankings. At the Australian Open, she reached the third round in jr. singles and won her first jr. major tournament doubles title with Nugroho. Later that year, she advanced to the semifinals of the French Open jr. singles, climbing to world juniors rank No. 2—the highest by a Filipino since Felix Barrientos in 1985.

In 2021, Eala continued her rise by winning her second junior major doubles title at the French Open with Oksana Selekhmeteva. She followed with a singles‑doubles sweep at the Trofeo Bonfiglio in Milan, reached the second round at Wimbledon, and advanced to the quarterfinals of the US Open juniors. Then in 2022, she became the first Filipino to win a junior major singles title, defeating Lucie Havlíčková in the US Open final.

== Professional ==
=== 2020–2024: Five ITF Circuit championships ===
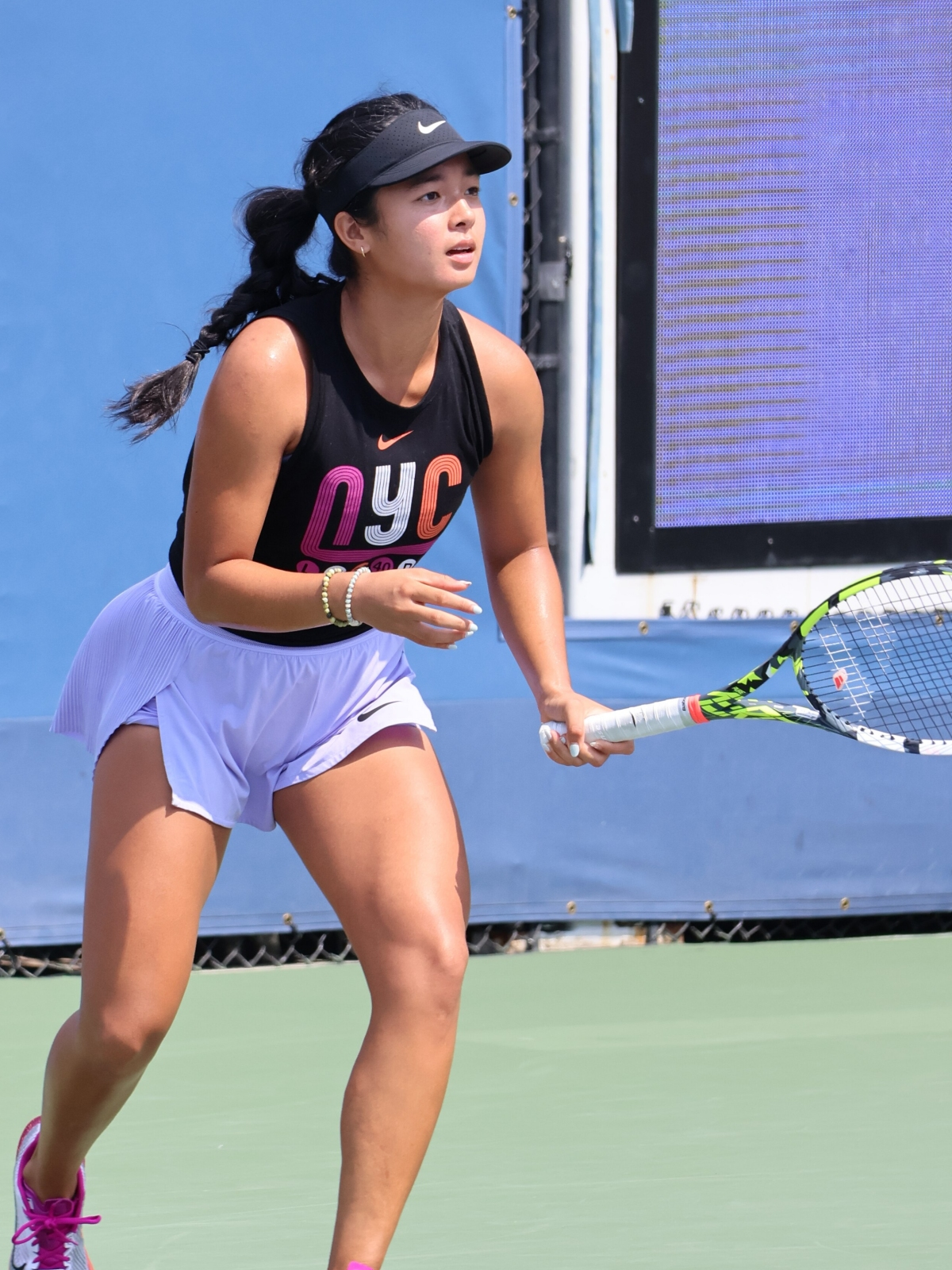
Eala training ahead of the 2024 US Open

Eala turned professional in March 2020, making her debut on the ITF Women's World Tennis Tour at the W15 Monastir series in Tunisia, where she won her first match as a professional.

In January 2021, she captured her maiden ITF title at the W15 Manacor event in Spain, becoming the youngest and lowest-seeded junior reserve to do so. The victory earned her entry into the WTA rankings, where she initially broke into the top 1000. Later that year, she reached her first ITF doubles final at the W25 Platja d'Aro in Spain with partner Selekhmeteva, and made her WTA Tour debut at the Romanian Open, where she became the first Filipino to win a tour-level match.

Eala continued to gain exposure in 2022, receiving a wildcard into the Miami Open, though she exited in the opening round. That year, she also secured her second ITF singles crown at the W25 Chiang Rai in Thailand.

In 2023, she entered major competition for the first time, appearing in the Australian Open qualifiers. She had early exits at the Thailand Open, Miami Open, and Madrid Open, but claimed ITF titles at the W25 Yecla in Spain and the W25 Roehampton in the United Kingdom.

The 2024 season marked further progress, highlighted by her victory at the W100 Open Araba en Femenino in Spain—her biggest ITF singles title to date. She also collected three ITF doubles trophies, partnering with Darja Semeņistaja to win the W50 Pune in India, and with Estelle Cascino to claim the W75 Open de Seine-et-Marne in Croissy-Beaubourg, France and the W100 Open Araba en Femenino in Spain. On the WTA Tour, Eala reached the quarterfinals of the Veneto Open, her best result of the year, and advanced to the semifinals of the WTA 125 Canberra International doubles event with Laura Pigossi.

In 2024, she was unable to progress beyond the qualifying rounds at all four Grand Slam tournaments. Her 2024 campaign included first round exits at Madrid, Abu Dhabi, Guadalajara 500, Wuhan, Guangzhou, Jiujiang, and second round of Guadalajara 125.

=== 2025: WTA 1000 semifinal, top 50 ===
Eala began 2025 at the WTA 125 Canberra International, reaching the semifinals. She then lost in qualifiers of both the Australian Open to Jana Fett, and Singapore Open, to Simona Waltert. In March, ranked No. 140, she received a wildcard for the Miami Open, where she defeated Jeļena Ostapenko, Madison Keys, and Iga Świątek before losing to Jessica Pegula in the semifinals. Following these results, Eala became the first Filipino to reach a WTA 1000 event semifinal, the first Filipino woman to defeat a major champion at a tour-level event in the Open Era, and the first wildcard in history to defeat three major champions in straight sets at a single WTA event. On March 31, she entered the WTA top 100 at No. 75.

She competed at the Madrid Open, losing in the second round to Świątek, and at the Italian Open, where she was defeated in the first round by Marta Kostyuk. In doubles, she reached the Italian Open quarterfinals with Coco Gauff. She lost in the first roud of Birmingham Open and Nottingham Open. At the Ilkley Open, she reached the quarterfinals. She then reached her first WTA 250 final at the Eastbourne Open, losing to Maya Joint. Eala's debut at Wimbledon resulted in two first-round losses: in singles to Barbora Krejčíková, and in doubles with Eva Lys to Ingrid Martins and Quinn Gleason. She lost in the first round of Canadian Open in Montreal, to Markéta Vondroušová. She later withdrew from the Cincinnati Open and the Monterrey Open due to a shoulder injury.

In her US Open debut, she defeated Clara Tauson in the first round, becoming the first Filipino player to achieve a match victory in a major tournament in the Open Era, but was defeated by Cristina Bucșa in the second round. Seeded second, she won her first WTA 125 title in Guadalajara, defeating Panna Udvardy in the final. Eala then lost to Janice Tjen during the quarterfinals in São Paulo. She competed at the Jingshan Open, where eventual champion Lulu Sun defeated her in the semifinals. At the Suzhou Open, she reached the quarterfinals, where she lost to eventual champion Viktorija Golubic.

She lost in qualifying at the Wuhan Open to Moyuka Uchijima, and in the first round at both the Japan Open to Tereza Valentová and the Guangzhou Open to Claire Liu. She then reached the second round of the Hong Kong Open before losing to Victoria Mboko. In doubles, she partnered with Nadiia Kichenok at the Guangzhou Open, reaching the semifinals before losing to Katarzyna Piter and Janice Tjen, and at the Hong Kong Open with Chan Hao-ching, but lost in the first round.

Eala finished 2025 ranked No. 50 in singles and No. 160 in doubles.

=== 2026: WTA 500 title, top 20 ===
Eala opened her 2026 season at the Auckland Open, reaching the semifinals in both singles and doubles; she was defeated by Wang Xinyu in singles, while in doubles she partnered with Iva Jovic and lost to Xu Yifan and Yang Zhaoxuan. She later reached the quarterfinals of the inaugural WTA 125 Philippine Women's Open as a wildcard, falling to eventual champion Camila Osorio. Her Australian Open debut ended in the first round of both singles and doubles, partnered with Ingrid Martins.

Eala began her Middle East campaign with a strong showing at the Abu Dhabi Open doubles, reaching the semifinals alongside Janice Tjen before falling to Tereza Mihalíková and Olivia Nicholls. In singles at the same event, she advanced to the quarterfinals before being stopped by Ekaterina Alexandrova. She later reached the quarterfinals of the Dubai Championships, where she was defeated by Gauff. Her run at the Qatar Open ended in the first round.

At the Indian Wells Open, Eala advanced to the fourth round, before falling to Linda Nosková. In doubles, she and Jovic were eliminated in the opening round. She followed this with another fourth-round appearance at the Miami Open, where she was defeated by Karolína Muchová.

Eala's clay performance peaked at the Italian Open, where she reached the third round, before losing to Elena Rybakina, while in doubles she partnered with Hailey Baptiste but was eliminated in the opening round. She also reached the second round in both singles and doubles at the Madrid Open, partnering with Zeynep Sönmez in doubles, while her other clay appearances ended in early-round defeats, including the second round of the Linz Open and first-round exits at the Stuttgart Open, Strasbourg International, and the French Open.

Shifting to grass courts, Eala won her second WTA 125 singles title at the Birmingham Open, defeating Nikola Bartůňková in the final. In the doubles event, she partnered with Bartůňková but was eliminated in the opening round. She reached the second round of the Queen's Club Championships in London before losing to Jovic. At the Berlin Open, Eala entered as a wild card and defeated Rybakina and Elina Svitolina to advance to the semifinals, where she lost to eventual champion Nosková. At the Bad Homburg Open, she was defeated in the first round of singles but partnered with Venus Williams in doubles to reach the quarterfinals. At Wimbledon, she defeated defending champion Świątek in the third round, before losing in the fourth round to Paolini. In doing so, she became the first Filipino player to reach the fourth round of a major singles tournament in the Open Era. In doubles, she partnered with Bartůňková for a first-round exit result.

At the Washington Open, she captured her first WTA 500 title by defeating top seed Pegula in the final. En route to the championship, she beat Zheng Qinwen, defending champion Fernandez, Svitolina, and Naomi Osaka. Following a rain delay, Eala rallied from a set down before dominating the decider. With the victory, she became the first Filipino to win a WTA title and rose to a career-high No. 20 in the rankings. At the Canadian Open, she reached the singles fourth round, where her seven-match winning streak ended following a loss to Belinda Bencic. She was also eliminated in the doubles first round alongside Venus Williams. At the Cincinnati Open, she was defeated by Amanda Anisimova in the third round. On August 24, 2026, Eala rose to no. 18 in the WTA rankings, surpassing both Yayuk Basuki and Tamarine Tanasugarn as the highest-ranked Southeast Asian player in WTA Tour history. At the US Open, Eala defeated Mary Stoiana and Oleksandra Oliynykova before losing in the third round to Jovic in three sets.

After the US Open, Eala participated in many tournaments during the Asian swing. Seeded third in the Singapore Open, she lost in the second round to Tatiana Prozorova in three sets after a first-round bye. Following her Asian Games campaign, she returned to the WTA Tour at the Wuhan Open. However, she suffered an early exit in the singles tournament after a first-round loss to qualifier Shi Han. The following day, she also had another early exit in doubles, where she partnered with Zeynep Sönmez, but lost in the first round to Anhelina Kalinina and Dayana Yastremska. At the Ningbo Open, Eala ended her three-match losing streak by defeating Diane Parry in the first round, before losing to Diana Shnaider in the second round. She then reached the quarterfinals of the Pan Pacific Open, where she lost again to eventual champion Shnaider in three sets. At the Hong Kong Open, she lost in straight sets to Claire Liu in her third career WTA Tour final. Eala finished the 2026 season ranked no. 15 in singles, becoming the second-highest-ranked women's tennis player representing an Asian country, behind world no. 1 Elena Rybakina.

== National representation ==
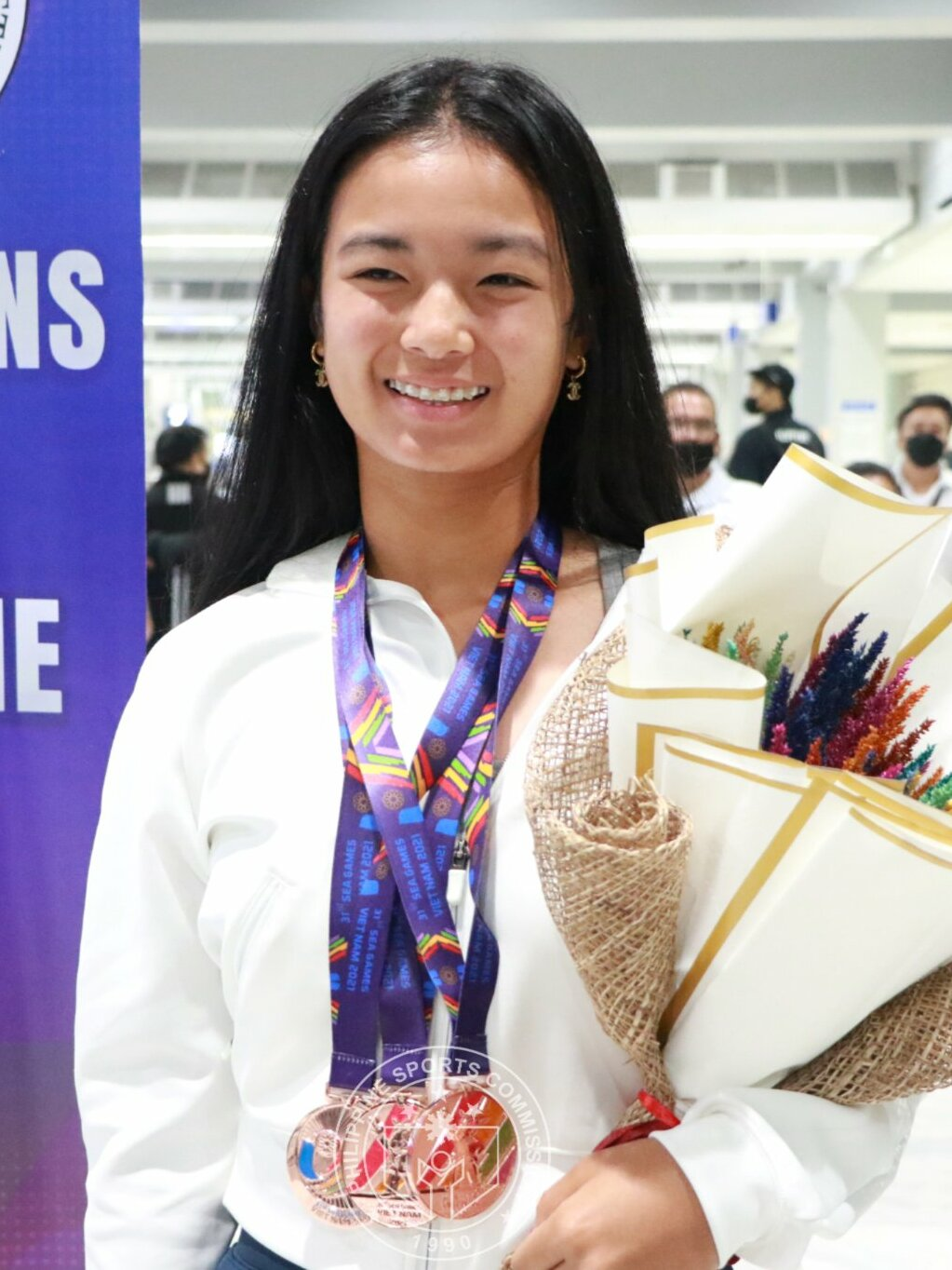
Eala with her bronze medals from the 2021 SEA Games

Eala has represented the Philippines in several events. At the 2021 SEA Games, (Note: Postponed to 2022 due to the COVID-19 pandemic.) she won bronze in women's singles, team, and mixed doubles. She repeated with bronzes in women's singles and mixed doubles at the 2022 Asian Games. (Note: Postponed to 2023 due to the COVID-19 pandemic.)

In 2024, she led Team Philippines to a 5–0 sweep in the Billie Jean King Cup Asia/Oceania Group III, finishing undefeated and securing promotion to Group II. She was not part of the national squad in 2025 or 2026. The 2024 roster included Eala together with Marian Capadocia, Khim Iglupas, and Shaira Rivera, while the following two years featured Stefi Aludo, Tennielle Madis, Alexa Milliam, and Rivera.

At the 2025 SEA Games in Thailand, she captured gold in women's singles, and bronzes in mixed doubles and women's team events, making her only the third Filipino ever—and the first in the 21st century—to win the gold medal in women's singles since Maricris Fernandez in 1999. (Note: She received a team medal despite not competing, alongside Shaira Rivera, Alexa Milliam, Tennielle Madis, and Stefi Aludo.)

Eala skipped the mandatory 2026 China Open, risking penalties from the WTA, to participate in the 2026 Asian Games in Aichi and Nagoya, Japan. She lost to China's Wang Xiyu in the semifinals, ending her bid for the gold medal and an early qualification for the 2028 Summer Olympics in Los Angeles. Eala finished the tournament with a bronze medal.

== Playing style ==
Eala is an aggressive baseliner, using her forehand to dictate rallies and her consistent two‑handed backhand to control exchanges. Her left‑handed topspin pushes opponents deep, while her return game is a strength due to anticipation. Her serve remains her main weakness, often lacking pace and variation, though she excels on hard courts. Analysts emphasize improving her serve, adding tactical variety, and building physical strength as key to further success.

Former pros Greg Rusedski, Andrea Petkovic, and Martina Navratilova all highlight the need for more power, reliability, and variation in Eala's serve, alongside greater conditioning.

=== Coaches ===
Eala has worked with several coaches during her career, many of them associated with the Rafa Nadal Academy. Daniel Gomez coached Eala during her formative years. His work emphasized consistency, mental focus, and physical conditioning, which provided the foundation for her transition to the professional circuit. Among her early mentors at the academy, Joan Bosch accompanied Eala during her run to the semifinals of the 2025 Miami Open and later at Wimbledon 2026, where he highlighted the importance of discipline and continuous training in Grand Slam competitions.

Alexandro "Sandro" Viaene became her main coach ahead of the 2025 season. He oversaw her pre‑season training and guided her attempt to qualify for the Australian Open, with an approach that emphasized structured preparation and conditioning for the demands of the WTA Tour. Toni Nadal joined her team during the 2025 Miami Open. Eala described his involvement as a "blessing," citing his experience from coaching Rafael Nadal as valuable to her development, particularly in discipline and adaptability. She has also worked with Lluc Bauzá, a medical fitness coach from the Rafa Nadal Academy, who supervised conditioning before her Wimbledon 2026 match against Iga Świątek.

== Sponsorships and endorsements ==
Eala signed her first endorsement deal at eight years old, as an ambassador for Filipino telecommunications company Globe. Starting from her junior career, she has been sponsored by French tennis brand Babolat. In 2019, she signed a sponsorship deal with Nike. In 2022, Eala was announced as an endorser for Filipino bank BPI. She has appeared on fashion spreads and magazine covers, including those of the November 2022 issue of Vogue Philippines and the January 2025 issue of Tatler Philippines.

In July 2025, for her Wimbledon debut, Nike gifted Eala with a hair tie designed in the form of a sampaguita blossom, the national flower of the Philippines. During the same month, Eala was announced as a brand ambassador for Filipino juice brand Locally. In August, Nike released an Eala-inspired limited edition shirt designed by Filipino artist Georgina Camus, featuring the "national flower of the Philippines overlaid on the All England Lawn Tennis Club's grass courts."

In February 2026, Eala became a brand ambassador for Milo Philippines. In August, she was announced as the face of Marriott Bonvoy's "Tennis The World" campaign in the Asia Pacific (APEC) region (excluding China), which features early Australian Open 2027 ticket access and other custom member experiences. In the same month, she was also announced as an ambassador for Panasonic Philippines. She was then named as an ambassador for Philippine Airlines in October.

== Personal life ==
Eala's favorite comfort food is caldereta, while she prefers matcha over coffee. She speaks English and Spanish, in addition to her native Filipino. Wimbledon is her favorite Grand Slam tournament, and says its Centre Court is the most beautiful tennis court. She cites Maria Sharapova and Rafael Nadal as her biggest influences.

Her breakthrough at the 2025 Miami Open gave rise to her status as one of the Philippines’ leading sports figures, with many drawing parallels to Manny Pacquiao, although Eala has downplayed such comparisons. By addressing fans and supporters in Tagalog during some of her post-match interviews, she helped spark greater interest in tennis among Filipinos both at home and across the diaspora. Eala has been noted for drawing large crowds to her matches.

== Awards and accolades ==
President Bongbong Marcos honors Eala with a presidential citation in July 2026

Eala has been recognized by the Philippine Sportswriters Association as an eight-time honoree (2019–2026) for her "outstanding achievements in tennis" at the PSA Annual Awards. In 2021, Tatler Asia included Eala in its annual list of Asia's most influential people. In April 2025, she was awarded the Premios Tanglaw trophy by the Philippine embassy in Madrid for her contributions in strengthening Philippines–Spain relations. The following year, she was recognized by the 2026 editions of the Time 100 Next and Forbes Asia's 30 Under 30 icons in entertainment and sports for elevating the Philippines in global tennis. She received a presidential citation at the Malacañang Palace in Manila on July 13, 2026, in recognition of her achievements at the 2026 Wimbledon tournament.

== Career statistics ==
=== Grand Slam singles performance timeline ===
Key
W	F	SF	QF	#R	RR	Q#	DNQ	A	NH

(W) winner; (F) finalist; (SF) semifinalist; (QF) quarterfinalist; (#R) rounds 4, 3, 2, 1; (RR) round-robin stage; (Q#) qualification round; (DNQ) did not qualify; (A) absent; (NH) not held; (SR) strike rate (events won / competed); (W–L) win–loss record.
To avoid confusion and double counting, these charts are updated at the conclusion of a tournament or when the player's participation has ended.

Tournament	2023	2024	2025	2026	SR	W–L	Win %
Australian Open	Q1	Q1	Q1	1R	0 / 1	0–1	0%
French Open	A	Q3	1R	1R	0 / 2	0–2	0%
Wimbledon	A	Q3	1R	4R	0 / 2	3–2	60%
US Open	A	Q3	2R	3R	0 / 2	3–2	60%
Win–loss	0–0	0–0	1–3	5–4	0 / 7	6–7	46%
