= Watsachol Sawatdee =

Thai tennis player

Watsachol Sawatdee วรรษชล สวัสดี
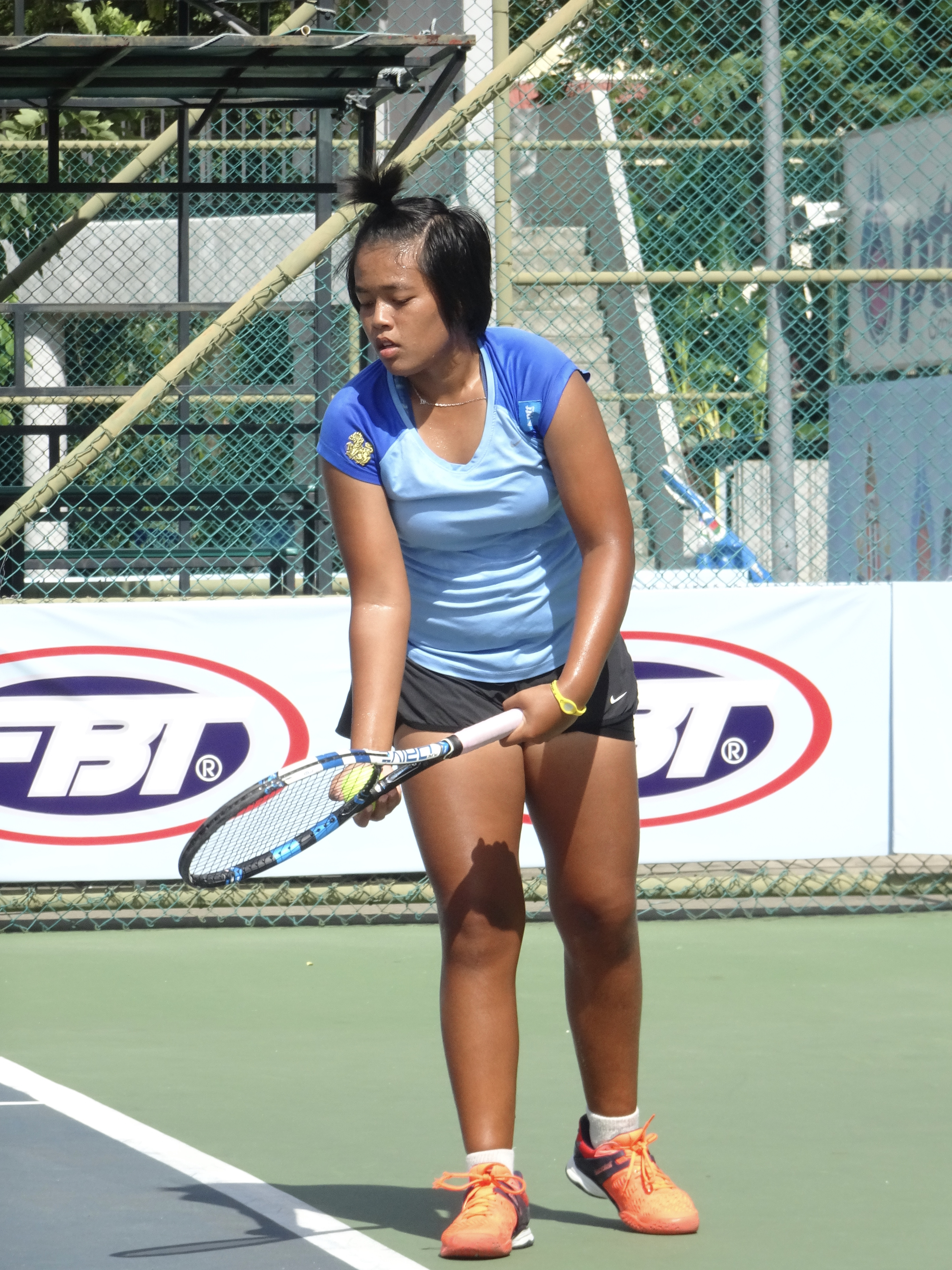
- Country (sports): Thailand
- Born: 17 January 2000 (age 25)
- Plays: Left (two-handed backhand)
- Prize money: $21,773

Singles
- Career record: 81–83
- Highest ranking: No. 692 (21 October 2019)
- Current ranking: No. 1307 (11 November 2024)

Doubles
- Career record: 35–53
- Career titles: 1 ITF
- Highest ranking: No. 680 (9 December 2019)
- Current ranking: No. 1530 (11 November 2024)

Team competitions
- Fed Cup: 3–1
- Last updated on: 11 November 2024.

Watsachol Sawatdee (Thai: วรรษชล สวัสดี; born 17 January 2000) is a Thai tennis player. She has a career-high singles ranking of world No. 692, achieved on 21 October 2019, by the WTA. She also has a career-high doubles ranking of No. 680, achieved on 9 December 2019.

Sawatdee has represented Thailand in the Billie Jean King Cup. She has scored a win-loss record of 3–1.

Sawatdee has won one doubles title on the ITF Circuit.

== ITF Circuit finals ==
=== Singles: 1 (runner–up) ===
Legend
W15 tournaments (0–1)

Result	W–L	Date	Tournament	Tier	Surface	Opponent	Score
Loss	0–1	Sep 2019	ITF Yeongwol, South Korea	W15	Hard	(South Korea) Ku Yeon-woo	6–3, 3–6, 2–6

=== Doubles: 3 (1 title, 2 runner–ups) ===
Legend
W15 tournaments (1–2)

Result	W–L	Date	Tournament	Tier	Surface	Partner	Opponents	Score
Loss	0–1	Nov 2017	ITF Sharm El Sheikh, Egypt	W15	Hard	(Thailand) Chanikarn Silakul	(United Kingdom) Jodie Burrage (United Kingdom) Freya Christie	4–6, 5–7
Loss	0–2	Sep 2019	ITF Yeongwol, South Korea	W15	Hard	(Thailand) Tamachan Momkoonthod	(South Korea) Hong Seung-yeon (South Korea) Kim Na-ri	7–5, 6–7^{(5)}, [9–11]
Win	1–2	Oct 2019	ITF Hua Hin, Thailand	W15	Hard	(Thailand) Tamachan Momkoonthod	(Thailand) Patcharin Cheapchandej (China) Zhuoma Ni Ma	7–5, 6–3
