= Patcharin Cheapchandej =

Thai tennis player (born 1994)

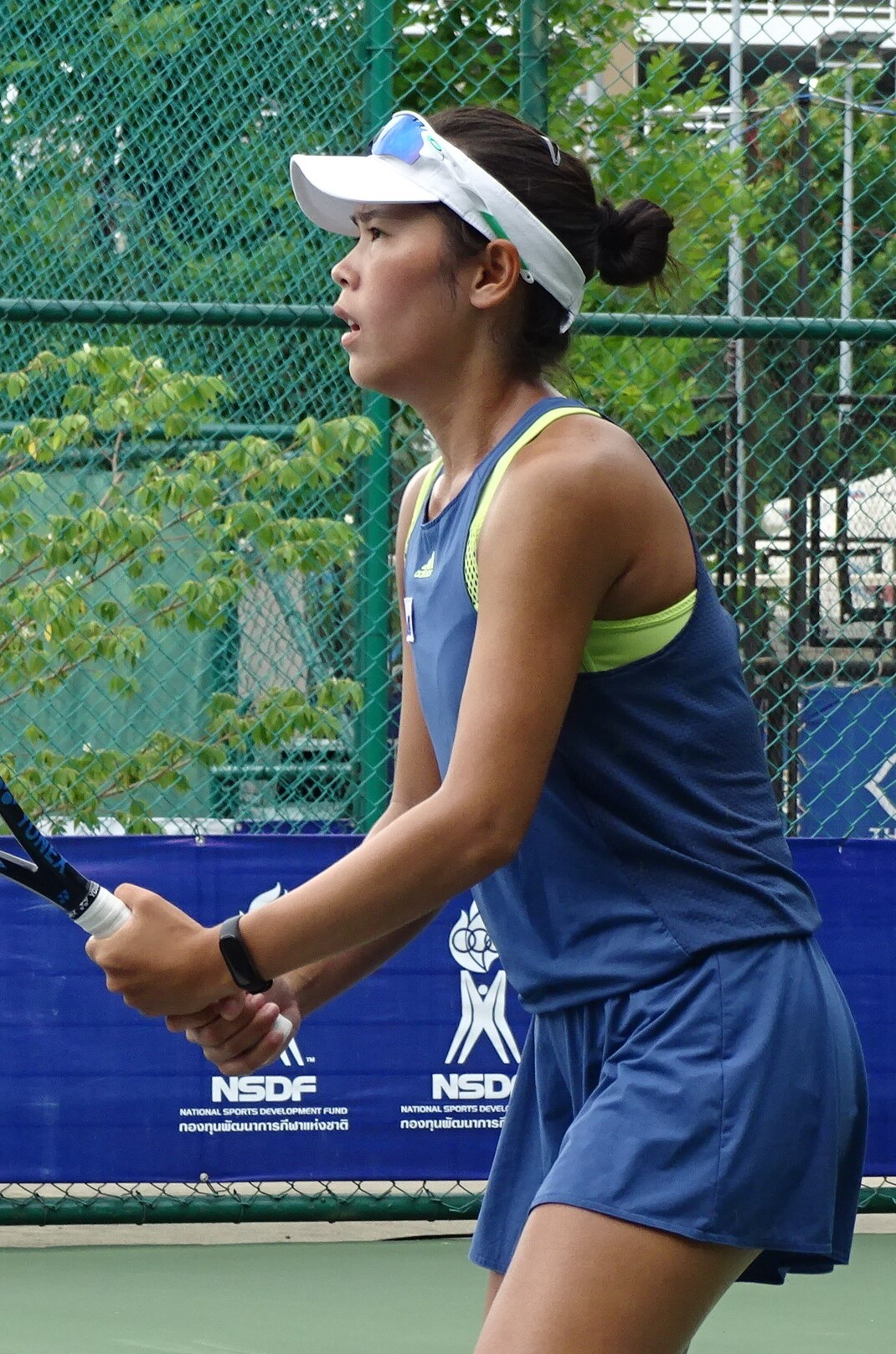
- Cheapchandej at the 2019 ITF Nonthaburi
- Native name: พัชรินทร์ ชีพชาญเดช
- Country (sports): Thailand
- Born: 13 December 1994 (age 31)
- Plays: Right (two-handed backhand)
- Prize money: $105,269

Singles
- Career record: 254–136
- Career titles: 13 ITF
- Highest ranking: No. 356 (22 June 2026)
- Current ranking: No. 477 (31 August 2026)

Doubles
- Career record: 133–110
- Career titles: 11 ITF
- Highest ranking: No. 533 (15 December 2025)
- Current ranking: No. 606 (31 August 2026)

Team competitions
- Fed Cup: 15–5
Medal record
Southeast Asian Games
Gold medal – first place	2021 Vietnam	Doubles
Gold medal – first place	2021 Vietnam	Team
Silver medal – second place	2021 Vietnam	Mixed doubles
Bronze medal – third place	2019 Philippines	Doubles
Bronze medal – third place	2019 Philippines	Mixed doubles
- Last updated on: 1 September 2026.

Patcharin "Eve" Cheapchandej (Thai: พัชรินทร์ ชีพชาญเดช; born 13 December 1994) is a Thai tennis player.

Cheapchandej has a career-high singles ranking by the Women's Tennis Association (WTA) of 356, achieved on 22 June 2026. Her highest doubles ranking of No. 533, she reached in December 2025. Cheapchandej has won 13 singles titles and eleven doubles titles on the ITF Women's Circuit.

== Career overview ==
Cheapchandej made her Fed Cup debut for Thailand in 2018. She has a 15–5 record in BJK Cup competition, as of August 2026.

== ITF Circuit finals ==
=== Singles: 17 (13 titles, 4 runner-ups) ===
Legend W35 tournaments W15 tournaments	Finals by surface Hard (13–4)

Result	W–L	Date	Tournament	Tier	Surface	Opponents	Score
Win	1–0	Apr 2017	ITF Hua Hin, Thailand	W15	Hard	(Hong Kong) Zhang Ling	6–1, 7–5
Win	2–0	Oct 2017	ITF Nonthaburi, Thailand	W15	Hard	(Chinese Taipei) Liang En-shuo	7–6^{(2)}, 6–0
Win	3–0	Sep 2018	ITF Nonthaburi, Thailand	W15	Hard	(Chinese Taipei) Lee Hua-chen	3–6, 7–6^{(8)}, 6–2
Loss	3–1	Jun 2023	ITF Nakhon Si Thammarat, Thailand	W15	Hard	(United States) Dasha Ivanova	6–7^{(3)}, 6–1, 3–6
Loss	3–2	Jul 2023	ITF Nakhon Si Thammarat, Thailand	W15	Hard	(Thailand) Anchisa Chanta	6–4, 5–7, 1–6
Win	4–2	Aug 2023	ITF Nakhon Si Thammarat, Thailand	W15	Hard	(Japan) Miho Kuramochi	6–3, 6–2
Win	5–2	Oct 2023	ITF Hua Hin, Thailand	W15	Hard	(Thailand) Salakthip Ounmuang	6–3, 6–2
Win	6–2	Jul 2024	ITF Nakhon Si Thammarat, Thailand	W35	Hard	(Japan) Kyōka Okamura	6–2, 6–3
Win	7–2	Jul 2024	ITF Nakhon Si Thammarat, Thailand	W15	Hard	(Australia) Alicia Smith	7–6^{(9)}, 6–2
Win	8–2	Aug 2024	ITF Nakhon Si Thammarat, Thailand	W15	Hard	(India) Vaishnavi Adkar	6–3, 6–3
Win	9–2	Jul 2025	ITF Nakhon Pathom, Thailand	W15	Hard	(Japan) Haruna Arakawa	6–1, 6–3
Win	10–2	Jul 2025	ITF Nakhon Pathom, Thailand	W15	Hard	(Japan) Yuno Kitahara	6–3, 6–1
Loss	10–3	Jul 2025	ITF Nakhon Pathom, Thailand	W35	Hard	(Thailand) Punnin Kovapitukted	6–3, 6–7^{(4)}, 1–6
Win	11–3	Aug 2025	ITF Nakhon Pathom, Thailand	W15	Hard	(Japan) Misaki Matsuda	6–3, 7–6^{(4)}
Win	12–3	Aug 2025	ITF Nakhon Pathom, Thailand	W35	Hard	(South Korea) Jang Gaeul	6–1, 6–2
Loss	12–4	Apr 2026	ITF Nakhon Pathom, Thailand	W15	Hard	(South Korea) Lee Gyeong-seo	5–7, 7–6^{(4)}, 2–6
Win	13–4	May 2026	ITF Nakhon Pathom, Thailand	W15	Hard	(China) Liu Yuhan	4–6, 6–3, 6–1

=== Doubles: 18 (11 titles, 7 runner-ups) ===
Legend W35 tournaments W10/15 tournaments	Finals by surface Hard (11–7)

Result	W–L	Date	Tournament	Tier	Surface	Partner	Opponents	Score
Loss	0–1	Sep 2013	ITF Antalya, Turkey	W10	Hard	(Thailand) Tanaporn Thongsing	(Finland) Emma Laine (United Kingdom) Melanie South	4–6, 3–6
Loss	0–2	Apr 2017	ITF Hua Hin, Thailand	W15	Hard	(South Korea) Han Sung-hee	(Thailand) Nudnida Luangnam (Thailand) Varunya Wongteanchai	5–7, 2–6
Loss	0–3	Jul 2017	ITF Hua Hin, Thailand	W15	Hard	(South Korea) Han Sung-hee	(Thailand) Nudnida Luangnam (Thailand) Varunya Wongteanchai	2–6, 6–7^{(5)}
Win	1–3	Jul 2019	ITF Hua Hin, Thailand	W15	Hard	(China) Ni Ma Zhuoma	(Thailand) Anchisa Chanta (Thailand) Supapitch Kuearum	6–3, 6–2
Win	2–3	Oct 2019	ITF Hua Hin, Thailand	W15	Hard	(Thailand) Punnin Kovapitukted	(China) Kang Jiaqi (Thailand) Tamarine Tanasugarn	6–3, 6–4
Loss	2–4	Oct 2019	ITF Hua Hin, Thailand	W15	Hard	(China) Ni Ma Zhuoma	(Thailand) Tamachan Momkoonthod (Thailand) Watsachol Sawatdee	5–7, 3–6
Loss	2–5	Jun 2022	ITF Chiang Rai, Thailand	W15	Hard	(Thailand) Anchisa Chanta	(Thailand) Chompoothip Jundakate (Thailand) Tamachan Momkoonthod	w/o
Win	3–5	Jun 2023	ITF Nakhon Si Thammarat, Thailand	W15	Hard	(Thailand) Anchisa Chanta	(Israel) Nicole Khirin (Australia) Sara Nayar	6–4, 4–6, [10–6]
Win	4–5	Jun 2023	ITF Nakhon Si Thammarat, Thailand	W15	Hard	(Thailand) Anchisa Chanta	(Australia) Sara Nayar (New Zealand) Vivian Yang	6–1, 7–6^{(4)}
Win	5–5	Oct 2023	ITF Hua Hin, Thailand	W15	Hard	(Thailand) Punnin Kovapitukted	(China) Sun Yifan (China) Zhang Jin	7–6^{(2)}, 7–5
Win	6–5	Jul 2024	ITF Nakhon Si Thammarat, Thailand	W15	Hard	(Thailand) Punnin Kovapitukted	(New Zealand) Monique Barry (Australia) Alicia Smith	6–3, 6–1
Loss	6–6	Mar 2025	ITF Nonthaburi, Thailand	W15	Hard	(Thailand) Kamonwan Yodpetch	(South Korea) Kim Na-ri (Thailand) Punnin Kovapitukted	4–6, 7–6^{(5)}, [7–10]
Loss	6–7	Aug 2025	ITF Nakhon Pathom, Thailand	W15	Hard	(Thailand) Anchisa Chanta	(South Korea) Kim Na-ri (China) Ye Qiuyu	3–6, 0–6
Win	7–7	Aug 2025	ITF Nakhon Pathom, Thailand	W35	Hard	(Thailand) Peangtarn Plipuech	(Japan) Sakura Hosogi (Japan) Misaki Matsuda	6–3, 6–1
Win	8–7	Nov 2025	ITF Hua Hin, Thailand	W15	Hard	(Thailand) Kamonwan Yodpetch	(Thailand) Thasaporn Naklo (Thailand) Lidia Podgorichani	6–2, 6–3
Win	9–7	Nov 2025	ITF Hua Hin, Thailand	W15	Hard	(Thailand) Kamonwan Yodpetch	Ulyana Hrabavets (Thailand) Lidia Podgorichani	6–4, 3–6, [11–9]
Win	10–7	Apr 2026	ITF Nakhon Pathom, Thailand	W15	Hard	(Thailand) Kamonwan Yodpetch	(Japan) Yuka Hosoki (New Zealand) Elyse Tse	6–3, 6–2
Win	11–7	Aug 2026	ITF Tianjin, China	W15	Hard	(Thailand) Kamonwan Yodpetch	(South Korea) Im Hee-rae (South Korea) Kim Eun-chae	2–6, 6–3, [10–8]
