= Anchisa Chanta =

Thai tennis player (born 2002)

Anchisa Chanta อัญชิสา ฉันทะ
- Country (sports): Thailand
- Born: 12 September 2002 (age 24)
- Plays: Left (two-handed both sides)
- Prize money: $69,079

Singles
- Career record: 163–98
- Career titles: 4 ITF
- Highest ranking: No. 423 (16 March 2026)
- Current ranking: No. 493 (26 October 2026)

Doubles
- Career record: 74–64
- Career titles: 7 ITF
- Highest ranking: No. 517 (16 October 2023)
- Current ranking: No. 667 (26 October 2026)

Team competitions
- Fed Cup: 7–2
Medal record
Women's Tennis
Representing Thailand
Southeast Asian Games
Gold medal – first place	2021 Vietnam	Doubles
Gold medal – first place	2021 Vietnam	Team
Silver medal – second place	2021 Vietnam	Singles
Silver medal – second place	2023 Cambodia	Team
Bronze medal – third place	2019 Philippines	Singles
Bronze medal – third place	2023 Cambodia	Singles
- Last updated on: 29 October 2026.

Anchisa Chanta (Thai: อัญชิสา ฉันทะ; born 12 September 2002) is a Thai tennis player. She has a career-high singles ranking of world No. 423, achieved on 16 March 2026, by the WTA. She also has a career-high doubles ranking of No. 517, reached on 16 October 2023. She has won four singles and six doubles titles on the ITF Circuit.

Chanta also represents Thailand in Billie Jean King Cup competition.

== ITF Circuit finals ==
=== Singles: 9 (4 titles, 5 runner-ups) ===
Legend W15 tournaments (4–5)	Finals by surface Hard (4–5)

Result	W–L	Date	Tournament	Tier	Surface	Opponent	Score
Loss	0–1	Nov 2018	ITF Nonthaburi, Thailand	W15	Hard	(Chinese Taipei) Lee Hua-chen	4–6, 1–6
Win	1–1	Sep 2021	ITF Monastir, Tunisia	W15	Hard	(Serbia) Elena Milovanović	7–6^{(4)}, 6–3
Loss	1–2	Jun 2023	ITF Nakhon Si Thammarat, Thailand	W15	Hard	(Israel) Nicole Khirin	7–5, 4–6, 2–6
Win	2–2	Jul 2023	ITF Nakhon Si Thammarat	W15	Hard	(Thailand) Patcharin Cheapchandej	4–6, 7–5, 6–1
Win	3–2	Mar 2025	ITF Nonthaburi, Thailand	W15	Hard	(South Korea) Back Da-yeon	7–6^{(3)}, 6–3
Loss	3–3	Jun 2025	ITF Hong Kong	W15	Hard	(China) Lu Jiajing	1–6, 1–6
Win	4–3	Nov 2025	ITF Hua Hin, Thailand	W15	Hard	(Thailand) Thasaporn Naklo	6–1, 1–6, 6–3
Loss	4–4	Mar 2026	ITF Maanshan, China	W15	Hard (i)	(South Korea) Jeong Bo-young	6–4, 2–6, 5–7
Loss	4–5	May 2026	ITF Nakhon Pathom, Thailand	W15	Hard	(South Korea) Lee Gyeong-seo	3–6, 3–6

=== Doubles: 12 (7 titles, 5 runner-ups) ===
Legend W15 tournaments (7–5)	Finals by surface Hard (7–5)

Result	W–L	Date	Tournament	Tier	Surface	Partner	Opponents	Score
Loss	0–1	Jul 2019	ITF Hua Hin, Thailand	W15	Hard	(Thailand) Supapitch Kuearum	(Thailand) Patcharin Cheapchandej (China) Ni Ma Zhuoma	3–6, 2–6
Loss	0–2	Jun 2022	ITF Chiang Rai, Thailand	W15	Hard	(Thailand) Patcharin Cheapchandej	(Thailand) Chompoothip Jundakate (Thailand) Tamachan Momkoonthod	walkover
Loss	0–3	Feb 2023	ITF Kuala Lumpur, Malaysia	W15	Hard	(Japan) Ayaka Okuno	(China) Guo Hanyu (Chinese Taipei) Li Yu-yun	0–6, 6–2, [2–10]
Win	1–3	Jun 2023	ITF Nakhon Si Thammarat, Thailand	W15	Hard	(Thailand) Patcharin Cheapchandej	(Israel) Nicole Khirin (Australia) Sara Nayar	6–4, 4–6, [10–6]
Win	2–3	Jun 2023	ITF Nakhon Si Thammarat	W15	Hard	(Thailand) Patcharin Cheapchandej	(Australia) Sara Nayar (Australia) Vivian Yang	6-1, 7–6^{(4)}
Win	3–3	Aug 2023	ITF Nakhon Si Thammarat	W15	Hard	(Thailand) Salakthip Ounmuang	(Kazakhstan) Gozal Ainitdinova (China) Yang Yidi	7–6^{(6)}, 6-2
Win	4–3	Oct 2023	ITF Hua Hin, Thailand	W15	Hard	(Japan) Ayumi Koshiishi	(China) Cao Yajing (Hong Kong) Maggie Ng	4–6, 6–4, [10–5]
Loss	4–4	Aug 2025	ITF Nakhon Pathom, Thailand	W15	Hard	(Thailand) Patcharin Cheapchandej	(South Korea) Kim Na-ri (China) Ye Qiuyu	3–6, 0–6
Win	5–4	Feb 2026	ITF Gurugram, India	W15	Hard	(Thailand) Thasaporn Naklo	Arina Arifullina; Evgeniya Burdina	6–4, 7–6^{(0)}
Win	6–4	May 2026	ITF Nakhon Pathom, Thailand	W15	Hard	(Thailand) Thasaporn Naklo	(South Korea) Im Hee-rae (South Korea) Kim Eun-chae	6–2, 6–1
Loss	6–5	May 2026	ITF Nakhon Pathom, Thailand	W15	Hard	(Thailand) Thasaporn Naklo	(Thailand) Lunda Kumhom (Thailand) Kamonwan Yodpetch	5–7, 7–6^{(4)}, [7–10]
Win	7–5	Oct 2026	ITF Singapore	W15	Hard	(Thailand) Thasaporn Naklo	(Chinese Taipei) Lin Fang-an (China) Lu Jingjing	6–1, 6–3

== Team competition ==
=== Billie Jean King Cup ===
==== Singles ====
Edition	Stage	Date	Location	Against	Surface	Opponent	W/L	Score
2020 Billie Jean King Cup	Z2 R/R	4 February 2020	Wellington, New Zealand	Turkmenistan	Hard (i)	Arzuv Klycheva	W	6–2, 6–1
2020 Billie Jean King Cup	Z2 R/R	6 February 2020	Wellington, New Zealand	Philippines	Hard (i)	Anna Clarice Patrimonio	W	6–1, 6–4
2020 Billie Jean King Cup	Z2 P/O	8 February 2020	Wellington, New Zealand	Pakistan	Hard (i)	Ushna Suhail	W	6–3, 6–7, 6–2
