= Shaira Rivera =

Filipino tennis player (born 1999)

- Full name: Shaira Hope Rivera
- Country (sports): Philippines
- Born: 1999 (age 26–27) Compostela Valley, Philippines

Shaira Hope Rivera is a Filipino tennis player.

== Early life and education ==
Shaira Hope Rivera was born in 1999 in Compostela Valley (now Davao de Oro) to Donisbelle and Rex Anthony Rivera. She has two sisters.

She studied at the Monkayo Central Elementary School in her hometown of Monkayo. She moved to Davao City after Typhoon Bopha (Pablo) struck in 2012 and attended the Santa Ana National High School (SANHS) for two years.

Rivera moved to Metro Manila. She finished her high school studies at the De La Salle Santiago Zobel School. She pursued a degree in literature at the Ateneo de Manila University but had to drop out due to the COVID-19 pandemic in 2021. She went to the United States in 2024 to study at the University of West Alabama (UWA) under a scholarship.

== Career ==
=== Early years ===
Rivera took up tennis when she was ten years old. She won the 2012 Palarong Pambansa doubles title. She went on to win a total of four gold medals and one silver medal in five Palaro stints. As a student at SANHS, she represented Davao City at the DAVRAA. She was also a trainee under the Philippine Tennis Academy.

=== College ===
In the United States, River has played for the West Alabama Tigers.

=== National team ===
Rivera has competed at the SEA Games. She made her debut in the Southeast Asian tournament in the 2019 edition. She won a bronze medal in the women's team event in the 2021 edition in Vietnam. She was also part of the women's team which played at the tennis tournament of the 2025 edition in Thailand.

She has competed at the Billie Jean King Cup as part of the Philippine team. Her first appearance was during the 2020–21 season. Her performance in 2020, led to Rivera being scouted for University of West Alabama by coach Jeff Beaman.

Rivera competed at the 2026 Asian Games in women's doubles, where she partnered with Alexandra Eala to win their first round against Hong Kong's Lai Ching Laam and Kallista Liu.
