= Higashiyama Park Tennis Center =

Tennis venue in Nagoya, Japan

- 東山公園テニスセンター
- Interactive map of Higashiyama Park Tennis Center
- Address: Nagoya; Japan
- Coordinates: 35.1477°N 136.9735°E
- Capacity: 3,502 (center court)
- Type: Tennis venue

Tenant
- 2026 Asian Games

Website
- shisetsu.mizuno.jp/m-7134

Higashiyama Park Tennis Center (東山公園テニスセンター, Higashiyama Kōen Tenisu Sentā) is a tennis venue in Nagoya, Japan.

== History ==
The Higashiyama Park Tennis Center opened on 16 July 1993 The venue was built specifically for the tennis tournament of the 39th National Sports Festival in 1994.

From 1996 to 1998, the Higashiyama Park Tennis Center hosted the ITF World Junior Tennis Finals. It was also the venue of the 2000 Japan Open Tennis Championships.

The venue was renovated for the 2026 Asian Games. The center court's capacity was modified to accommodate 3,502 fixed seats.
