= 2024 ATP Hong Kong Tennis Open – Singles =

Singles
- 2024 ATP Hong Kong Tennis Open

Final
- Champion: Andrey Rublev
- Runner-up: (Finland) Emil Ruusuvuori
- Score: 6–4, 6–4

Details
- Draw: 28 (4 Q / 3 WC )
- Seeds: 8

Events
Singles	Doubles
← 2002 ·	Hong Kong Open	· 2025 →

Andrey Rublev defeated Emil Ruusuvuori in the final, 6–4, 6–4 to win the singles tennis title at the 2024 ATP Hong Kong Tennis Open. It was his 15th ATP Tour singles title.

Juan Carlos Ferrero was the reigning champion from 2002, when the men's event was last held, but he retired from professional tennis in 2012.

== Seeds ==
The top four seeds received a bye into the second round.

1. Andrey Rublev (champion)
2. Karen Khachanov (second round)
3. (United States) Frances Tiafoe (quarterfinals)
4. (Argentina) Francisco Cerúndolo (second round)
5. (Germany) Jan-Lennard Struff (second round)
6. (Italy) Lorenzo Musetti (second round)
7. (Serbia) Laslo Djere (first round)
8. (France) Arthur Fils (quarterfinals)

== Draw ==
=== Key ===
- Q = Qualifier
- WC = Wild card
- LL = Lucky loser
- Alt = Alternate
- ITF = ITF entry
- PR = Protected ranking
- SR = Special ranking
- SE = Special exempt
- JE = Junior exempt
- JR = Junior Accelerator Programme entrant
- CO = College Accelerator Programme entrant
- NG = Next Gen Accelerator Program entrant
- w/o = Walkover
- r = Retired
- d = Defaulted

=== Finals ===
Semifinals
1	Andrey Rublev	4	6	6
WC	(China) Shang Juncheng	6	2	3
(Austria) Sebastian Ofner	6	5	3
(Finland) Emil Ruusuvuori	4	7	6

Final
1	Andrey Rublev	6	6
(Finland) Emil Ruusuvuori	4	4

=== Top half ===
First round
Q	(United Kingdom) L Broady	6	6
(Argentina) P Cachin	4	0
Q	(Switzerland) M-A Hüsler	6	6
Q	(Ukraine) V Sachko	4	4
(Croatia) B Gojo	3	6	1
8	(France) A Fils	6	4	6
(Serbia) M Kecmanović	6	6
Q	(Japan) T Daniel	3	2
WC	(Japan) S Mochizuki	5	1
(Netherlands) B van de Zandschulp	7	6
WC	(China) J Shang	6^{5}	6	7^{10}
7	(Serbia) L Djere	7^{7}	3	6^{8}

Second round
1	A Rublev	6	7^{10}
Q	(United Kingdom) L Broady	4	6^{8}
Q	(Switzerland) M-A Hüsler	5	5
8	(France) A Fils	7	7
3	(United States) F Tiafoe	6	7^{7}
(Serbia) M Kecmanović	3	6^{4}
(Netherlands) B van de Zandschulp	7^{7}	6^{2}	6^{2}
WC	(China) J Shang	6^{5}	7^{7}	7^{7}

Quarterfinals
1	A Rublev	6	1	6
8	(France) A Fils	4	6	2
3	(United States) F Tiafoe	4	4
WC	(China) J Shang	6	6

Semifinals
1	A Rublev	4	6	6
WC	(China) J Shang	6	2	3

=== Bottom half ===
First round
5	(Germany) J-L Struff	3	7^{7}	7^{9}
PR	(Croatia) M Čilić	6	6^{4}	6^{7}
(Austria) S Ofner	6	6
(United States) M McDonald	1	2
(Hungary) F Marozsán	2	3
(Spain) R Bautista Agut	6	6
6	(Italy) L Musetti	6	7
WC	(Hong Kong) C Wong	4	5
P Kotov	6	6
(Portugal) N Borges	2	4
(Finland) E Ruusuvuori	6^{5}	6	6
(France) B Bonzi	7^{7}	2	1

Second round
5	(Germany) J-L Struff	7^{7}	6^{5}	6^{2}
(Austria) S Ofner	6^{4}	7^{7}	7^{7}
(Spain) R Bautista Agut	7	6
4	(Argentina) F Cerúndolo	5	3
6	(Italy) L Musetti	4	3
P Kotov	6	6
(Finland) E Ruusuvuori	7^{7}	2	6
2	K Khachanov	6^{2}	6	2

Quarterfinals
(Austria) S Ofner	6	6
(Spain) R Bautista Agut	4	4
P Kotov	3	6^{4}
(Finland) E Ruusuvuori	6	7^{7}

Semifinals
(Austria) S Ofner	6	5	3
(Finland) E Ruusuvuori	4	7	6

== Qualifying ==
=== Seeds ===
1. (Japan) Taro Daniel (qualified)
2. (Spain) Jaume Munar (first round)
3. (United Kingdom) Liam Broady (qualified)
4. (Hungary) Zsombor Piros (first round)
5. (Belgium) Zizou Bergs (first round)
6. (France) Térence Atmane (qualifying competition)
7. (Belgium) Joris De Loore (first round)
8. (Japan) Sho Shimabukuro (first round)

=== Qualifiers ===
1. (Japan) Taro Daniel
2. (Switzerland) Marc-Andrea Hüsler
3. (United Kingdom) Liam Broady
4. (Ukraine) Vitaliy Sachko

=== Qualifying draw ===
==== First qualifier ====
First round
1	(Japan) Taro Daniel	6	6
WC	(Hong Kong) Wong Tsz-fu	0	3
(United Kingdom) Jan Choinski	6	6
5	(Belgium) Zizou Bergs	2	2

Qualifying competition
1	(Japan) Taro Daniel	6	3	6
(United Kingdom) Jan Choinski	4	6	4

==== Second qualifier ====
First round
2	(Spain) Jaume Munar	6	3	4
(Finland) Otto Virtanen	3	6	6
(Switzerland) Marc-Andrea Hüsler	6	6
8	(Japan) Sho Shimabukuro	2	4

Qualifying competition
(Finland) Otto Virtanen	2	0
(Switzerland) Marc-Andrea Hüsler	6	6

==== Third qualifier ====
First round
3	(United Kingdom) Liam Broady	6	6
(Tunisia) Aziz Dougaz	3	3
(Argentina) Román Andrés Burruchaga	6^{5}	7^{8}	6
7	(Belgium) Joris De Loore	7^{7}	6^{6}	4

Qualifying competition
3	(United Kingdom) Liam Broady	6	6
(Argentina) Román Andrés Burruchaga	2	3

==== Fourth qualifier ====
First round
4	(Hungary) Zsombor Piros	3	2
(Ukraine) Vitaliy Sachko	6	6
WC	(Hong Kong) Wong Hong-kit	4	2
6	(France) Térence Atmane	6	6

Qualifying competition
(Ukraine) Vitaliy Sachko	7^{7}	6
6	(France) Térence Atmane	6^{4}	1
