= 2015 Hong Kong Tennis Open =

- Date: October 12–18
- Edition: 6th
- Category: WTA International
- Draw: 32S / 16D
- Prize money: $250,000
- Surface: Hard
- Location: Hong Kong
- Venue: Victoria Park Tennis Stadium

Champions

Singles
- (Serbia) Jelena Janković

Doubles
- (France) Alizé Cornet / (Kazakhstan) Yaroslava Shvedova
| ← 2014 · | Hong Kong Tennis Open | · 2016 → |

The 2015 Hong Kong Tennis Open (also known as the Prudential Hong Kong Tennis Open for sponsorship reasons) was a professional tennis tournament played on hard courts. It was the sixth edition of the tournament, and part of the 2015 WTA Tour. It took place in Victoria Park, Hong Kong, from October 12 to 18.

== Points and prize money ==
=== Point distribution ===
| Event | W | F | SF | QF | Round of 16 | Round of 32 | Q | Q2 | Q1 |
| Singles | 280 | 180 | 110 | 60 | 30 | 1 | 18 | 12 | 1 |
| Doubles | 280 | 180 | 110 | 60 | 1 | — | — | — | — |

=== Prize money ===
| Event | W | F | SF | QF | Round of 16 | Round of 32^{1} | Q2 | Q1 |
| Singles | $43,000 | $21,400 | $11,500 | $6,200 | $3,420 | $2,220 | $1,285 | $750 |
| Doubles * | $12,300 | $6,400 | $3,435 | $1,820 | $960 | — | — | — |

_{^{1} Qualifiers prize money is also the Round of 32 prize money}
_{* per team}

== Singles main-draw entrants ==
=== Seeds ===
| Country | Player | Rank^{1} | Seed |
|---|---|---|---|
| ~~ESP~~ | ~~Garbiñe Muguruza~~ | ~~5~~ | ~~1~~ |
| GER | Angelique Kerber | 10 | 2 |
| USA | Venus Williams | 14 | 3 |
| SRB | Jelena Janković | 24 | 4 |
| AUS | Samantha Stosur | 25 | 5 |
| RUS | Daria Gavrilova | 35 | 6 |
| FRA | Caroline Garcia | 39 | 7 |
| FRA | Alizé Cornet | 44 | 8 |

- ^{1} Rankings are as of October 5, 2015

=== Other entrants ===
The following players received wildcards into the singles main draw:

- (Serbia) Jelena Janković
- (Germany) Angelique Kerber
- (Australia) Samantha Stosur
- (Hong Kong) Zhang Ling

The following players received entry from the qualifying draw:

- (Romania) Ana Bogdan
- (South Korea) Jang Su-jeong
- (Japan) Miyu Kato
- (Ukraine) Kateryna Kozlova
- (Chinese Taipei) Lee Ya-hsuan
- (France) Irina Ramialison

The following players received entry as lucky losers:

- (Ukraine) Yuliya Beygelzimer
- (Russia) Anastasiya Komardina

=== Withdrawals ===
Before the tournament

- (Belarus) Victoria Azarenka →replaced by (China) Wang Yafan
- (Canada) Eugenie Bouchard (concussion) →replaced by (Australia) Anastasia Rodionova
- (Australia) Casey Dellacqua (concussion)→replaced by (Ukraine) Yuliya Beygelzimer
- (Kazakhstan) Zarina Diyas →replaced by (Japan) Risa Ozaki
- (Germany) Sabine Lisicki (knee injury) →replaced by (Italy) Francesca Schiavone
- (Spain) Garbiñe Muguruza (left ankle injury)→replaced by (Russia) Anastasiya Komardina
- (Croatia) Ajla Tomljanović →replaced by (China) Zhang Kailin
- (United States) CoCo Vandeweghe →replaced by (Thailand) Luksika Kumkhum

=== Retirements ===
- (United States) Christina McHale (left elbow injury)

== Doubles main-draw entrants ==
=== Seeds ===
| Country | Player | Country | Player | Rank^{1} | Seed |
|---|---|---|---|---|---|
| ESP | Lara Arruabarrena | SLO | Andreja Klepač | 61 | 1 |
| POL | Klaudia Jans-Ignacik | AUS | Anastasia Rodionova | 94 | 2 |
| CHN | Liang Chen | CHN | Wang Yafan | 129 | 3 |
| FRA | Alizé Cornet | KAZ | Yaroslava Shvedova | 184 | 4 |

^{1} Rankings are as of October 5, 2015

=== Other entrants ===
The following pairs received wildcards into the doubles main draw:

- (Hong Kong) Ki Yan-tung / (Hong Kong) Maggie Ng
- (Hong Kong) Sher Chun-wing / (Hong Kong) Wu Ho-ching

=== Withdrawals ===
During the tournament

- (Chinese Taipei) Chang Kai-chen (neck injury)
- (United States) Christina McHale (left elbow injury)
- (Chinese Taipei) Lee Ya-hsuan (right hamstring strain)

== Champions ==
=== Singles ===
- (Serbia) Jelena Janković def. (Germany) Angelique Kerber 3–6, 7–6^{(7–4)}, 6–1

=== Doubles ===
- (France) Alizé Cornet / (Kazakhstan) Yaroslava Shvedova def. (Spain) Lara Arruabarrena / (Slovenia) Andreja Klepač 7–5, 6–4
