= 2024 ATP Hong Kong Tennis Open – Doubles =

Doubles
- 2024 ATP Hong Kong Tennis Open

Final
- Champions: (El Salvador) Marcelo Arévalo (Croatia) Mate Pavić
- Runners-up: (Belgium) Sander Gillé (Belgium) Joran Vliegen
- Score: 7–6^{(7–3)}, 6–4

Details
- Draw: 16 (2 WC )
- Seeds: 4

Events
| Singles | Doubles |
| ← 2002 · | Hong Kong Open | · 2025 → |

Marcelo Arévalo and Mate Pavić defeated Sander Gillé and Joran Vliegen in the final, 7–6^{(7–3)}, 6–4 to win the men's doubles tennis title at the 2024 ATP Hong Kong Tennis Open.

Jan-Michael Gambill and Graydon Oliver were the reigning champions from 2002, when the men's event was last held, but they had since retired from professional tennis.

== Seeds ==
1. (Belgium) Sander Gillé / (Belgium) Joran Vliegen (final)
2. (El Salvador) Marcelo Arévalo / (Croatia) Mate Pavić (champions)
3. (France) Sadio Doumbia / (France) Fabien Reboul (first round)
4. (Austria) Alexander Erler / (Austria) Lucas Miedler (quarterfinals)

== Draw ==
=== Key ===
- Q = Qualifier
- WC = Wild card
- LL = Lucky loser
- Alt = Alternate
- ITF = ITF entry
- PR = Protected ranking
- SR = Special ranking
- SE = Special exempt
- JE = Junior exempt
- JR = Junior Accelerator Programme entrant
- CO = College Accelerator Programme entrant
- NG = Next Gen Accelerator Program entrant
- w/o = Walkover
- r = Retired
- d = Defaulted

=== Draw ===
First round
1 | (Belgium) S Gillé (Belgium) J Vliegen | 4 | 6 | [10]
(United States) E King (United States) R Stalder | 6 | 4 | [4]
WC | (Belgium) Z Bergs (Hong Kong) C Wong | 2 | 4
K Khachanov; A Rublev | 6 | 6
3 | (France) S Doumbia (France) F Reboul | 7^{7} | 5 | [9]
(United Kingdom) J Cash (United States) R Galloway | 6^{5} | 7 | [11]
(United States) M McDonald (Netherlands) B van de Zandschulp | 6 | 6
WC | (Argentina) RA Burruchaga (Japan) S Mochizuki | 4 | 1
(Uruguay) A Behar (Czech Republic) A Pavlásek | 6 | 6
(Germany) C Frantzen (Germany) H Jebens | 4 | 4
(Hungary) F Marozsán (Austria) S Ofner | 4 | 7^{7} | [8]
4 | (Austria) A Erler (Austria) L Miedler | 6 | 6^{5} | [10]
(Argentina) P Cachin (Argentina) F Cerúndolo | w/o
(Serbia) L Djere (Spain) J Munar
(Portugal) F Cabral (United Kingdom) H Patten | 4 | 6^{3}
2 | (El Salvador) M Arévalo (Croatia) M Pavić | 6 | 7^{7}

Quarterfinals
1 | (Belgium) S Gillé (Belgium) J Vliegen | 6 | 6
K Khachanov; A Rublev | 3 | 4
(United Kingdom) J Cash (United States) R Galloway | w/o
(United States) M McDonald (Netherlands) B van de Zandschulp
(Uruguay) A Behar (Czech Republic) A Pavlásek | 7^{8} | 6
4 | (Austria) A Erler (Austria) L Miedler | 6^{6} | 3
(Argentina) P Cachin (Argentina) F Cerúndolo | 2 | 2
2 | (El Salvador) M Arévalo (Croatia) M Pavić | 6 | 6

Semifinals
1 | (Belgium) S Gillé (Belgium) J Vliegen | 7^{8} | 7
(United Kingdom) J Cash (United States) R Galloway | 6^{6} | 5
(Uruguay) A Behar (Czech Republic) A Pavlásek | 7 | 3 | [12]
2 | (El Salvador) M Arévalo (Croatia) M Pavić | 5 | 6 | [14]

Final
1 | (Belgium) S Gillé (Belgium) J Vliegen | 6^{3} | 4
2 | (El Salvador) M Arévalo (Croatia) M Pavić | 7^{7} | 6
