= 2026 ATP Hong Kong Tennis Open =

ATP tennis tournament

- Date: 5–11 January 2026
- Edition: 30th
- Category: ATP Tour 250 series
- Draw: 28S / 16D
- Surface: Hard / outdoor
- Location: Hong Kong
- Venue: Victoria Park Tennis Stadium

Champions

Singles
- (Kazakhstan) Alexander Bublik

Doubles
- (Italy) Lorenzo Musetti / (Italy) Lorenzo Sonego
- Hong Kong Open (tennis)

The 2026 ATP Hong Kong Tennis Open (also known as the Bank of China Hong Kong Tennis Open for sponsorship reasons) was a men's tennis tournament played on outdoor hard courts. It was the 30th edition of the ATP Hong Kong Open, and part of the ATP 250 tournaments on the 2026 ATP Tour. It took place at the Victoria Park Tennis Stadium in Hong Kong, from 5 to 11 January 2026.

== Champions ==
=== Singles ===
- (Kazakhstan) Alexander Bublik def. (Italy) Lorenzo Musetti 7–6^{(7–2)}, 6–3

=== Doubles ===
- (Italy) Lorenzo Musetti / (Italy) Lorenzo Sonego def Karen Khachanov / Andrey Rublev 6–4, 2–6, [10–1]

== Singles main-draw entrants ==
=== Seeds ===
| Country | Player | Rank^{1} | Seeds |
|---|---|---|---|
| ITA | Lorenzo Musetti | 8 | 1 |
| KAZ | Alexander Bublik | 11 | 2 |
| | Andrey Rublev | 16 | 3 |
| | Karen Khachanov | 17 | 4 |
| ITA | Lorenzo Sonego | 40 | 5 |
| CAN | Gabriel Diallo | 41 | 6 |
| FRA | Alexandre Müller | 43 | 7 |
| POR | Nuno Borges | 47 | 8 |

- ^{1} Rankings are as of 29 December 2025.

=== Other entrants ===
The following players received wildcards into the singles main draw:

- (China) Shang Juncheng
- (Hong Kong) Coleman Wong
- (China) Wu Yibing

The following player received entry through the Next Gen Accelerator program:

- (Japan) Rei Sakamoto

The following players received entry from the qualifying draw:

- (Serbia) Laslo Djere
- (United States) Michael Mmoh
- (Germany) Jan-Lennard Struff
- (Chile) Alejandro Tabilo

=== Withdrawals ===
- (France) Arthur Fils → replaced by (Netherlands) Botic van de Zandschulp

== Doubles main-draw entrants ==
=== Seeds ===
| Country | Player | Country | Player | Rank^{1} | Seed |
|---|---|---|---|---|---|
| NED | Sander Arends | MON | Romain Arneodo | 73 | 1 |
| AUT | Alexander Erler | USA | Robert Galloway | 82 | 2 |
| GER | Constantin Frantzen | NED | Robin Haase | 103 | 3 |
| CZE | Petr Nouza | CZE | Patrik Rikl | 115 | 4 |

- ^{1} Rankings are as of 29 December 2025

=== Other entrants ===
The following pairs received wildcards into the doubles main draw:

- (Canada) Gabriel Diallo / (Hong Kong) Coleman Wong
- (Hong Kong) Kai Thompson / (China) Zhou Yi

The following pair received entry using a protected ranking:

- (Bosnia and Herzegovina) Tomislav Brkić / (Bosnia and Herzegovina) Damir Džumhur
