= 2026 ATP Hong Kong Tennis Open – Singles =

Singles
- 2026 ATP Hong Kong Tennis Open

Final
- Champion: (Kazakhstan) Alexander Bublik
- Runner-up: (Italy) Lorenzo Musetti
- Score: 7–6^{(7–2)}, 6–3

Details
- Draw: 28 (4 Q / 3 WC )
- Seeds: 8

Events
Singles	Doubles
- Hong Kong Open

Alexander Bublik defeated Lorenzo Musetti in the final, 7–6^{(7–2)}, 6–3 to win the singles tennis title at the 2026 ATP Hong Kong Tennis Open. It was his ninth ATP Tour title. With the win, Bublik made his top-10 debut in the ATP rankings, becoming the first Kazakhstani man to do so.

Alexandre Müller was the defending champion, but lost in the second round to Marcos Giron.

== Seeds ==
The top four seeds received a bye into the second round.

1. (Italy) Lorenzo Musetti (final)
2. (Kazakhstan) Alexander Bublik (champion)
3. Andrey Rublev (semifinals)
4. Karen Khachanov (second round)
5. (Italy) Lorenzo Sonego (second round)
6. (Canada) Gabriel Diallo (second round)
7. (France) Alexandre Müller (second round)
8. (Portugal) Nuno Borges (quarterfinals)

== Draw ==
Key

- Q = Qualifier
- WC = Wild card
- LL = Lucky loser
- Alt = Alternate
- ITF = ITF entry
- PR = Protected ranking
- SR = Special ranking
- SE = Special exempt
- JE = Junior exempt
- JR = Junior Accelerator Programme entrant
- CO = College Accelerator Programme entrant
- NG = Next Gen Accelerator Program entrant
- w/o = Walkover
- r = Retired
- d = Defaulted

=== Finals ===
Semifinals
1	(Italy) Lorenzo Musetti	6^{3}	7	6
3	Andrey Rublev	7^{7}	5	4
(United States) Marcos Giron	6	4	2
2	(Kazakhstan) Alexander Bublik	3	6	6

Final
1	(Italy) Lorenzo Musetti	6^{2}	3
2	(Kazakhstan) Alexander Bublik	7^{7}	6

=== Top half ===
First round
(Argentina) TM Etcheverry	6	7
(France) V Royer	4	5
WC	(Hong Kong) C Wong	6	7
(Argentina) M Navone	3	5
(Netherlands) J de Jong	4	6^{7}
6	(Canada) G Diallo	6	7^{9}
WC	(China) Y Wu	6	6
(Hungary) F Marozsán	4	2
(Croatia) M Čilić	6	6
(France) A Mannarino	3	2
(Bosnia and Herzegovina) D Džumhur	4	3
8	(Portugal) N Borges	6	6

Second round
1	(Italy) L Musetti	6^{3}	6	6
(Argentina) TM Etcheverry	7^{7}	2	4
WC	(Hong Kong) C Wong	1	7	7
6	(Canada) G Diallo	6	5	5
3	A Rublev	3	6	6
WC	(China) Y Wu	6	2	1
(Croatia) M Čilić	5	3
8	(Portugal) N Borges	7	6

Quarterfinals
1	(Italy) L Musetti	6	6
WC	(Hong Kong) C Wong	4	4
3	A Rublev	6	6
8	(Portugal) N Borges	3	4

Semifinals
1	(Italy) L Musetti	6^{3}	7	6
3	A Rublev	7^{7}	5	4

=== Bottom half ===
First round
7	(France) A Müller	7	6
(Serbia) M Kecmanović	5	4
Q	(Serbia) L Djere	2	0
(United States) M Giron	6	6
Q	(Chile) A Tabilo	5	4
Q	(United States) M Mmoh	7	6
5	(Italy) L Sonego	6	7^{7}
NG	(Japan) R Sakamoto	2	6^{4}
WC	(China) J Shang	6	6
(Argentina) F Comesaña	4	4
Q	(Germany) J-L Struff	3	6	1
(Netherlands) B van de Zandschulp	6	1	6

Second round
7	(France) A Müller	4	6^{4}
(United States) M Giron	6	7^{7}
Q	(United States) M Mmoh	7^{7}	7^{7}
4	K Khachanov	6^{2}	6^{4}
5	(Italy) L Sonego	3	4
WC	(China) J Shang	6	6
(Netherlands) B van de Zandschulp	3	3
2	(Kazakhstan) A Bublik	6	6

Quarterfinals
(United States) M Giron	6	1
Q	(United States) M Mmoh	3	0^{r}
WC	(China) J Shang	1	6^{2}
2	(Kazakhstan) A Bublik	6	7^{7}

Semifinals
(United States) M Giron	6	4	2
2	(Kazakhstan) A Bublik	3	6	6

== Qualifying ==
=== Seeds ===
1. (Chile) Cristian Garín (first round)
2. (Chile) Alejandro Tabilo (qualified)
3. (Germany) Jan-Lennard Struff (qualified)
4. (United States) Emilio Nava (qualifying competition)
5. (Serbia) Laslo Djere (qualified)
6. (United States) Patrick Kypson (qualifying competition)
7. (China) Bu Yunchaokete (first round)
8. (Italy) Francesco Maestrelli (first round)

=== Qualifiers ===
1. (United States) Michael Mmoh
2. (Chile) Alejandro Tabilo
3. (Germany) Jan-Lennard Struff
4. (Serbia) Laslo Djere

=== Draw ===
==== First qualifier ====
First round
1/Alt	(Chile) Cristian Garín	6	3	5
PR	(United States) Michael Mmoh	3	6	7
(Ukraine) Vitaliy Sachko	2	3
6	(United States) Patrick Kypson	6	6

Qualifying competition
PR	(United States) Michael Mmoh	6	3	6
6	(United States) Patrick Kypson	2	6	4

==== Second qualifier ====
First round
2	(Chile) Alejandro Tabilo	7^{7}	3	6
(France) Luca Van Assche	6^{3}	6	3
WC	(China) Zhou Yi	6	6
8	(Italy) Francesco Maestrelli	0	3

Qualifying competition
2	(Chile) Alejandro Tabilo	4	6	6
WC	(China) Zhou Yi	6	4	3

==== Third qualifier ====
First round
3	(Germany) Jan-Lennard Struff	7	7^{7}
(Hungary) Zsombor Piros	5	6^{3}
(United States) Nishesh Basavareddy	7^{11}	6
7	(China) Bu Yunchaokete	6^{9}	3

Qualifying competition
3	(Germany) Jan-Lennard Struff	7^{7}	6
(United States) Nishesh Basavareddy	6^{5}	2

==== Fourth qualifier ====
First round
4	(United States) Emilio Nava	6	6
WC	(Hong Kong) Kai Thompson	3	2
(Sweden) Elias Ymer	4	6^{3}
5	(Serbia) Laslo Djere	6	7^{7}

Qualifying competition
4	(United States) Emilio Nava	5	6^{1}
5	(Serbia) Laslo Djere	7	7^{7}
