= Hong Kong National Tennis Championships =

Tournament information
- Event name: Prudential Hong Kong National Tennis Championships
- Sponsor: Prudential
- Founded: 1937
- Location: Hong Kong
- Venue: Victoria Park Tennis Centre
- Surface: Hard

The Hong Kong National Tennis Championships is a combined men's and women's grass court tennis tournament founded in 1937 as the Hong Kong National Hardcourt Championships. The championships are held at Victoria Park Tennis Courts, Hong Kong.

== History ==
The first Hong Kong Hardcourt Championships were inaugurated in 1937, and held at Chinese Recreation Club (CRC). The championships continued through to 1977 under that name. In 1978 the tournament was renamed as the Hong Kong National Tennis Championships. As of 2022 the championships are sponsored by Prudential Hong Kong and operate under the brand name the Prudential Hong Kong National Tennis Championships.

== Venues ==
The Hong Kong National Hardcourt Championships were originally held at Chinese Recreation Club (CRC). Since 1982 the Hong Kong National Tennis Championships have been staged the Victoria Park Tennis Centre, Hong Kong.

== See also ==
- Hong Kong National Grass Court Championships
- Hong Kong Open
