= 2014 Hong Kong Tennis Open – Singles =

Singles
- 2014 Hong Kong Tennis Open

Final
- Champion: (Germany) Sabine Lisicki
- Runner-up: (Czech Republic) Karolína Plíšková
- Score: 7–5, 6–3

Details
- Draw: 32
- Seeds: 8

Events
Singles	Doubles
Hong Kong Tennis Open	· 2015 →

This was the first edition of Hong Kong Tennis Open.

Sabine Lisicki won the title, defeating Karolína Plíšková in the final, 7–5, 6–3.

== Seeds ==
1. (Germany) Sabine Lisicki (champion)
2. (Slovakia) Daniela Hantuchová (second round)
3. (Czech Republic) Karolína Plíšková (final)
4. (United States) Christina McHale (first round)
5. (China) Zheng Jie (quarterfinals)
6. (Belgium) Yanina Wickmayer (second round)
7. (Slovakia) Jana Čepelová (quarterfinals)
8. (Slovakia) Anna Schmiedlová (first round)

== Draw ==
=== Key ===
- Q = Qualifier
- WC = Wild card
- LL = Lucky loser
- Alt = Alternate
- ITF = ITF entry
- PR = Protected ranking
- SR = Special ranking
- SE = Special exempt
- JE = Junior exempt
- JR = Junior Accelerator Programme entrant
- CO = College Accelerator Programme entrant
- NG = Next Gen Accelerator Program entrant
- w/o = Walkover
- r = Retired
- d = Defaulted

=== Finals ===
Semifinals
1/WC	(Germany) Sabine Lisicki	6	3	6
(Italy) Francesca Schiavone	3	6	2
3	(Czech Republic) Karolína Plíšková	6	4	6
(Belgium) Alison Van Uytvanck	1	6	4

Final
1/WC	(Germany) Sabine Lisicki	7	6
3	(Czech Republic) Karolína Plíšková	5	3

=== Top half ===
First round
1/WC	(Germany) S Lisicki	3	7^{7}	6
(Romania) M Niculescu	6	6^{3}	1
(United States) G Min	6	6
(Israel) J Glushko	4	2
(China) S Zheng	7^{7}	7
WC	(China) Y Duan	6^{1}	5
Q	(Russia) E Kulichkova	4	4
6	(Belgium) Y Wickmayer	6	6
4	(United States) C McHale	4	7	2
(Italy) F Schiavone	6	5	6
(Sweden) J Larsson	3	3
(Japan) K Date-Krumm	6	6
Q	(China) L Zhu	1	6	6
(Czech Republic) Kr Plíšková	6	3	3
(South Africa) C Scheepers	2	1
7	(Slovakia) J Čepelová	6	6

Second round
1/WC	(Germany) S Lisicki	6	6
(United States) G Min	1	1
(China) S Zheng	6	6
6	(Belgium) Y Wickmayer	4	2
(Italy) F Schiavone	6	4
(Japan) K Date-Krumm	3	0^{r}
Q	(China) L Zhu	1	3
7	(Slovakia) J Čepelová	6	6

Quarterfinals
1/WC	(Germany) S Lisicki	6	6
(China) S Zheng	4	3
(Italy) F Schiavone	6	6
7	(Slovakia) J Čepelová	2	2

Semifinals
1/WC	(Germany) S Lisicki	6	3	6
(Italy) F Schiavone	3	6	2

=== Bottom half ===
First round
5	(China) J Zheng	6	7^{7}
LL	(Japan) M Eguchi	1	6^{5}
Q	(China) K Zhang	6	6
(France) P Parmentier	0	3
(Austria) P Mayr-Achleitner	1	1
(Puerto Rico) M Puig	6	6
(Slovenia) P Hercog	6	4	3
3	(Czech Republic) Ka Plíšková	2	6	6
8	(Slovakia) A Schmiedlová	2	6^{5}
(Netherlands) K Bertens	6	7^{7}
(Thailand) L Kumkhum	6^{3}	2
Q	(Australia) J Gajdošová	7^{7}	6
(Poland) K Piter	2	1
(Belgium) A Van Uytvanck	6	6
WC	(Hong Kong) L Zhang	1	4
2	(Slovakia) D Hantuchová	6	6

Second round
5	(China) J Zheng	6	6
Q	(China) K Zhang	1	4
(Puerto Rico) M Puig	3	4
3	(Czech Republic) Ka Plíšková	6	6
(Netherlands) K Bertens	6	1	4
Q	(Australia) J Gajdošová	4	6	6
(Belgium) A Van Uytvanck	3	6	6
2	(Slovakia) D Hantuchová	6	2	4

Quarterfinals
5	(China) J Zheng	1	3
3	(Czech Republic) Ka Plíšková	6	6
Q	(Australia) J Gajdošová	4	2
(Belgium) A Van Uytvanck	6	6

Semifinals
3	(Czech Republic) Ka Plíšková	6	4	6
(Belgium) A Van Uytvanck	1	6	4

== Qualifying ==
=== Seeds ===
1. (Australia) Jarmila Gajdošová (qualified)
2. (Austria) Tamira Paszek (second round)
3. (United States) Nicole Gibbs (first round)
4. (China) Wang Qiang (first round)
5. (China) Zheng Saisai (moved to main draw)
6. (Japan) Misa Eguchi (qualifying competition, lucky loser)
7. (Poland) Magda Linette (second round)
8. (Russia) Ekaterina Bychkova (second round)
9. (Slovenia) Nastja Kolar (second round)

=== Qualifiers ===
1. (Australia) Jarmila Gajdošová
2. (China) Zhang Kailin
3. (China) Zhu Lin
4. (Russia) Elizaveta Kulichkova

=== Lucky loser ===
1. (Japan) Misa Eguchi

=== Qualifying draw ===
==== First qualifier ====
First round
1	(Australia) Jarmila Gajdošová	6	6
(Japan) Yurika Sema	2	2
WC	(Chinese Taipei) Hsieh Shu-ying	5	4
WC	(Hong Kong) Wu Ho-ching	7	6
(Croatia) Petra Martić	1	3
(Japan) Junri Namigata	6	6
WC	(Hong Kong) Claire Spackman	4	2
9	(Slovenia) Nastja Kolar	6	6

Second round
1	(Australia) Jarmila Gajdošová	6	6
WC	(Hong Kong) Wu Ho-ching	4	2
(Japan) Junri Namigata	6	6
9	(Slovenia) Nastja Kolar	2	3

Qualifying competition
1	(Australia) Jarmila Gajdošová	6	4	6
(Japan) Junri Namigata	3	6	4

==== Second qualifier ====
First round
2	(Austria) Tamira Paszek	6	6
(Chinese Taipei) Hsu Wen-hsin	1	1
(China) Zhang Kailin	6	6
(Georgia (country)) Sofia Shapatava	4	3
(Australia) Arina Rodionova	6	6
WC	(Hong Kong) Ng Kwan-yau	0	2
(Japan) Shuko Aoyama	1	2
6	(Japan) Misa Eguchi	6	6

Second round
2	(Austria) Tamira Paszek	1	2
(China) Zhang Kailin	6	6
(Australia) Arina Rodionova	3	4
6	(Japan) Misa Eguchi	6	6

Qualifying competition
(China) Zhang Kailin	7	6
6	(Japan) Misa Eguchi	5	3

==== Third qualifier ====
First round
3	(United States) Nicole Gibbs	6^{2}	2
Alt	(Romania) Raluca Olaru	7^{7}	6
(China) Wang Yafan	5	2
(China) Zhu Lin	7	6
(United Kingdom) Emily Webley-Smith	7^{7}	2	3
(Bulgaria) Elitsa Kostova	6^{4}	6	6
(China) Han Xinyun	6^{0}	4
7	(Poland) Magda Linette	7^{7}	6

Second round
Alt	(Romania) Raluca Olaru	4	3
(China) Zhu Lin	6	6
(Bulgaria) Elitsa Kostova	6	0	6
7	(Poland) Magda Linette	4	6	2

Qualifying competition
(China) Zhu Lin	6	6
(Bulgaria) Elitsa Kostova	4	0

==== Fourth qualifier ====
First round
4	(China) Wang Qiang	1	4
(Russia) Elizaveta Kulichkova	6	6
(Japan) Miharu Imanishi	2	7	1
(Japan) Erika Sema	6	5	6
(France) Irena Pavlovic	3	1
(China) Xu Yifan	6	6
(Hungary) Melinda Czink	6^{2}	0
8	(Russia) Ekaterina Bychkova	7^{7}	6

Second round
(Russia) Elizaveta Kulichkova	6	6
(Japan) Erika Sema	1	2
(China) Xu Yifan	7^{7}	6
8	(Russia) Ekaterina Bychkova	6^{5}	1

Qualifying competition
(Russia) Elizaveta Kulichkova	6	6
(China) Xu Yifan	2	4
