= 2026 Hong Kong Tennis Open – Doubles =

Doubles
- 2026 Hong Kong Tennis Open

Final
- Champions: (Chinese Taipei) Chan Hao-ching (Japan) Miyu Kato
- Runners-up: (Australia) Talia Gibson (Australia) Maddison Inglis
- Score: 6–4, 6–4
- Date: 8 November 2026

Details
- Draw: 16
- Seeds: 4

Events
Singles	Doubles
- Hong Kong Tennis Open

Chan Hao-ching and Miyu Kato defeated Talia Gibson and Maddison Inglis 6–4, 6–4 to win the doubles tennis title at the 2026 Hong Kong Tennis Open.

Jiang Xinyu and Wang Yafan were the reigning champions, but Wang did not participate this year. Jiang partnered Cody Wong, but lost in the semifinals to Chan and Kato.

== Seeds ==
1. Maria Kozyreva / (United Kingdom) Maia Lumsden (first round)
2. (Chinese Taipei) Chan Hao-ching / (Japan) Miyu Kato (champions)
3. (Estonia) Ingrid Neel / (Mexico) Giuliana Olmos (first round)
4. (Czech Republic) Jesika Malečková / (Czech Republic) Miriam Škoch (semifinals)

== Draw ==
Key

- Q = Qualifier
- WC = Wild card
- LL = Lucky loser
- Alt = Alternate
- ITF = ITF entry
- PR = Protected ranking
- SR = Special ranking
- SE = Special exempt
- JE = Junior exempt
- JR = Junior Accelerator Programme entrant
- CO = College Accelerator Programme entrant
- NG = Next Gen Accelerator Program entrant
- w/o = Walkover
- r = Retired
- d = Defaulted

=== Draw ===
First round
1	M Kozyreva (United Kingdom) M Lumsden	7	4	[9]
(Australia) T Gibson (Australia) M Inglis	5	6	[11]
(China) Q Tang (China) Q Ye	6	6
WC	(Hong Kong) A Karunaratne (Hong Kong) C-y Shek	3	4
4	(Czech Republic) J Malečková (Czech Republic) M Škoch	6	6
(Argentina) N Fossa Huergo; E Pridankina	3	0
(Chinese Taipei) Y-h Lee (Chinese Taipei) F-h Wu	6	3	[4]
WC	(United States) V Williams (China) Y Xu	4	6	[10]
(Georgia (country)) E Gorgodze (Uzbekistan) M Timofeeva	6^{4}	6^{3}
(Chinese Taipei) I-h Cho (Chinese Taipei) Y-t Cho	7^{7}	7^{7}
(China) X Jiang (Hong Kong) C Wong	6	7
3	(Estonia) I Neel (Mexico) G Olmos	4	5
(Japan) M Ninomiya (China) Y Zhang	6	6
(Japan) E Hozumi (Slovenia) A Klepač	4	3
(United States) C Harrison (United States) D Hewitt	6	3	[10]
2	(Chinese Taipei) H-c Chan (Japan) M Kato	4	6	[12]

Quarterfinals
(Australia) T Gibson (Australia) M Inglis	6	6
(China) Q Tang (China) Q Ye	3	4
4	(Czech Republic) J Malečková (Czech Republic) M Škoch	4	6	[10]
WC	(United States) V Williams (China) Y Xu	6	2	[4]
(Chinese Taipei) I-h Cho (Chinese Taipei) Y-t Cho	3	4
(China) X Jiang (Hong Kong) C Wong	6	6
(Japan) M Ninomiya (China) Y Zhang	6	3	[7]
2	(Chinese Taipei) H-c Chan (Japan) M Kato	1	6	[10]

Semifinals
(Australia) T Gibson (Australia) M Inglis	6	6
4	(Czech Republic) J Malečková (Czech Republic) M Škoch	4	2
(China) X Jiang (Hong Kong) C Wong	1	1
2	(Chinese Taipei) H-c Chan (Japan) M Kato	6	6

Final
(Australia) T Gibson (Australia) M Inglis	4	4
2	(Chinese Taipei) H-c Chan (Japan) M Kato	6	6
