= 2024 ATP Hong Kong Tennis Open =

ATP tennis tournament

- Date: 1–7 January 2024
- Edition: 28th
- Category: ATP Tour 250 series
- Draw: 28S / 16D
- Surface: Hard / outdoor
- Location: Hong Kong
- Venue: Victoria Park Tennis Stadium

Champions

Singles
- Andrey Rublev

Doubles
- (El Salvador) Marcelo Arévalo / (Croatia) Mate Pavić
- Hong Kong Open (tennis)

The 2024 ATP Hong Kong Tennis Open (also known as the Bank of China Hong Kong Tennis Open for sponsorship reasons) was a men's tennis tournament played on outdoor hard courts. It was the 28th edition of the ATP Hong Kong Open, and the first since 2002. It took place at the Victoria Park Tennis Stadium in Hong Kong, from 1 to 7 January 2024.

== Champions ==
=== Singles ===
- Andrey Rublev def. (Finland) Emil Ruusuvuori, 6–4, 6–4

=== Doubles ===
- (El Salvador) Marcelo Arévalo / (Croatia) Mate Pavić def. (Belgium) Sander Gillé / (Belgium) Joran Vliegen, 7–6^{(7–3)}, 6–4

== Singles main-draw entrants ==
=== Seeds ===
Country	Player	Rank^{1}	Seed
	Andrey Rublev	5	1
	Karen Khachanov	15	2
USA	Frances Tiafoe	16	3
ARG	Francisco Cerúndolo	21	4
GER	Jan-Lennard Struff	25	5
ITA	Lorenzo Musetti	27	6
SRB	Laslo Djere	33	7
FRA	Arthur Fils	36	8

- ^{1} Rankings are as of 25 December 2023.

=== Other entrants ===
The following players received wildcards into the singles main draw:

- (Japan) Shintaro Mochizuki
- (China) Shang Juncheng
- (Hong Kong) Coleman Wong

The following player received entry using a protected ranking:

- (Croatia) Marin Čilić

The following players received entry from the qualifying draw:

- (United Kingdom) Liam Broady
- (Japan) Taro Daniel
- (Switzerland) Marc-Andrea Hüsler
- (Ukraine) Vitaliy Sachko

=== Withdrawals ===
- (United States) Christopher Eubanks → replaced by (France) Benjamin Bonzi
- (Canada) Milos Raonic → replaced by (Croatia) Borna Gojo

== Doubles main-draw entrants ==
=== Seeds ===
Country	Player	Country	Player	Rank^{1}	Seed
BEL	Sander Gillé	BEL	Joran Vliegen	50	1
ESA	Marcelo Arévalo	CRO	Mate Pavić	51	2
FRA	Sadio Doumbia	FRA	Fabien Reboul	70	3
AUT	Alexander Erler	AUT	Lucas Miedler	77	4

- ^{1} Rankings are as of 25 December 2023

=== Other entrants ===
The following pairs received wildcards into the doubles main draw:

- (Belgium) Zizou Bergs / (Hong Kong) Coleman Wong
- (Argentina) Román Andrés Burruchaga / (Japan) Shintaro Mochizuki

=== Withdrawals ===
- (Serbia) Laslo Djere / (Spain) Bernabé Zapata Miralles → replaced by (Serbia) Laslo Djere / (Spain) Jaume Munar
