= 2002 Hong Kong Open =

- Date: 23–29 September
- Edition: 27th
- Category: International Series
- Draw: 32S / 16D
- Surface: Hard / outdoor
- Location: Hong Kong

Champions

Singles
- (Spain) Juan Carlos Ferrero

Doubles
- (United States) Jan-Michael Gambill / (United States) Graydon Oliver
- Hong Kong Open

The 2002 Hong Kong Open was a men's tennis tournament played on outdoor hard courts in Hong Kong and was part of the International Series of the 2002 ATP Tour. The tournament ran from September 23 through September 29, 2002. Second-seeded Juan Carlos Ferrero won the singles draw.

== Finals ==
=== Singles ===
(Spain) Juan Carlos Ferrero defeated (Spain) Carlos Moyá 6–3, 1–6, 7–6^{(7–4)}

- It was Ferrero's 2nd title of the year and the 7th of his career.

=== Doubles ===
(United States) Jan-Michael Gambill / (United States) Graydon Oliver defeated (Australia) Wayne Arthurs / (Australia) Andrew Kratzmann 6–7^{(2–7)}, 6–4, 7–6^{(7–4)}

- It was Gambill's 2nd title of the year and the 6th of his career. It was Oliver's only title of the year and the 1st of his career.
