= 2026 Hong Kong Tennis Open =

- Date: 2–8 November
- Edition: 13th
- Category: WTA 250
- Draw: 32S / 16D
- Prize money: $283,347
- Surface: Hard
- Location: Hong Kong
- Venue: Victoria Park Tennis Stadium

Champions

Singles
- (United States) Claire Liu

Doubles
- (Chinese Taipei) Chan Hao-ching / (Japan) Miyu Kato
- Hong Kong Tennis Open

The 2026 Hong Kong Tennis Open (also known as the Prudential Hong Kong Tennis Open for sponsorship reasons) was a professional women's tennis tournament played on outdoor hard courts. It was the 13th edition of the tournament, and part of the WTA 250 tournaments on the 2026 WTA Tour. It took place in Victoria Park, Hong Kong from 2 to 8 November 2026.

== Champions ==
=== Singles ===
- (United States) Claire Liu def. (Philippines) Alexandra Eala, 6–3, 6–0

=== Doubles ===
- (Chinese Taipei) Chan Hao-ching / (Japan) Miyu Kato def. (Australia) Talia Gibson / (Australia) Maddison Inglis, 6–4, 6–4

== Singles main-draw entrants ==
=== Seeds ===
Country	Player	Rank^{1}	Seed
ROU	Sorana Cîrstea	16	1
PHI	Alexandra Eala	19	2
~~CAN~~	~~Leylah Fernandez~~	~~23~~	~~3~~
GRE	Maria Sakkari	30	4
AUS	Talia Gibson	38	5
CHN	Wang Xinyu	39	6
	Liudmila Samsonova	43	7
GBR	Katie Boulter	48	8

- ^{1} Rankings are as of 26 October 2026.

=== Other entrants ===
The following players received wildcards into the singles main draw:

- (Australia) Maddison Inglis
- (Hong Kong) Adithya Karunaratne
- ~~(China) Sun Xinran~~
- (United States) Venus Williams

The following players received entry from the qualifying draw:

- Tatiana Prozorova
- (Japan) Himeno Sakatsume
- Aliaksandra Sasnovich
- Alexandra Shubladze

The following players received entry as lucky losers:

- (Australia) Emerson Jones
- (United States) Carol Young Suh Lee
- Elena Pridankina
- (United Kingdom) Mika Stojsavljevic

=== Withdrawals ===
- (Australia) Kimberly Birrell → replaced by (United States) Sofia Kenin
- (Hungary) Anna Bondár → replaced by (Ukraine) Dayana Yastremska
- (Spain) Cristina Bucșa → replaced by (Switzerland) Viktorija Golubic
- (Canada) Leylah Fernandez → replaced by (United Kingdom) Mika Stojsavljevic (LL)
- (Ukraine) Anhelina Kalinina → replaced by (Australia) Emerson Jones (LL)
- (United Kingdom) Sonay Kartal → replaced by Elena Pridankina (LL)
- (United States) Ann Li → replaced by (Australia) Maya Joint
- (Italy) Jasmine Paolini → replaced by (United States) Claire Liu
- (Egypt) Mayar Sherif → replaced by (United States) Katie Volynets
- Diana Shnaider → replaced by (United States) Mary Stoiana
- (Ukraine) Daria Snigur → replaced by (Uzbekistan) Maria Timofeeva
- (Ukraine) Yuliia Starodubtseva → replaced by (Croatia) Antonia Ružić
- (China) Sun Xinran → replaced by (United States) Carol Young Suh Lee (LL)
- (China) Zheng Qinwen → replaced by (Czech Republic) Tereza Valentová

== Doubles main-draw entrants ==
=== Seeds ===
Country	Player	Country	Player	Rank^{1}	Seed
	Maria Kozyreva	GBR	Maia Lumsden	83	1
TPE	Chan Hao-ching	JPN	Miyu Kato	85	2
EST	Ingrid Neel	MEX	Giuliana Olmos	96	3
CZE	Jesika Malečková	CZE	Miriam Škoch	108	4

- ^{1} Rankings as of 26 October 2026.

=== Other entrants ===
The following pairs received wildcards into the main draw:

- (Hong Kong) Adithya Karunaratne / (Hong Kong) Shek Cheuk-ying
- (United States) Venus Williams / (China) Xu Yifan
