= 2026 ATP Hong Kong Tennis Open – Doubles =

Doubles
- 2026 ATP Hong Kong Tennis Open

Final
- Champions: (Italy) Lorenzo Musetti (Italy) Lorenzo Sonego
- Runners-up: Karen Khachanov; Andrey Rublev
- Score: 6–4, 2–6, [10–1]

Details
- Draw: 16 (2 WC )
- Seeds: 4

Events
Singles	Doubles
- Hong Kong Open

Lorenzo Musetti and Lorenzo Sonego defeated Karen Khachanov and Andrey Rublev in the final, 6–4, 2–6, [10–1] to win the doubles title at the 2026 ATP Hong Kong Tennis Open. It was the first ATP Tour doubles title for Musetti and third for Sonego.

Sander Arends and Luke Johnson were the reigning champions, but Johnson chose to compete in Brisbane instead. Arends partnered Romain Arneodo, but lost in the first round to Vasil Kirkov and Bart Stevens.

== Seeds ==
1. (Netherlands) Sander Arends / (Monaco) Romain Arneodo (first round)
2. (Austria) Alexander Erler / (United States) Robert Galloway (quarterfinals)
3. (Germany) Constantin Frantzen / (Netherlands) Robin Haase (quarterfinals)
4. (Czech Republic) Petr Nouza / (Czech Republic) Patrik Rikl (first round)

== Draw ==
Key

- Q = Qualifier
- WC = Wild card
- LL = Lucky loser
- Alt = Alternate
- ITF = ITF entry
- PR = Protected ranking
- SR = Special ranking
- SE = Special exempt
- JE = Junior exempt
- JR = Junior Accelerator Programme entrant
- CO = College Accelerator Programme entrant
- NG = Next Gen Accelerator Program entrant
- w/o = Walkover
- r = Retired
- d = Defaulted

=== Draw ===
First round
1	(Netherlands) S Arends (Monaco) R Arneodo	6^{5}	4
(United States) V Kirkov (Netherlands) B Stevens	7^{7}	6
(Ecuador) G Escobar (Mexico) MÁ Reyes-Varela	w/o
(Netherlands) J de Jong (United States) E Nava
4	(Czech Republic) P Nouza (Czech Republic) P Rikl	7^{7}	3	[9]
K Khachanov; A Rublev	6^{5}	6	[11]
(France) T Arribagé (France) A Olivetti	6^{6}	6	[11]
WC	(Hong Kong) K Thompson (China) Y Zhou	7^{8}	3	[9]
WC	(Canada) G Diallo (Hong Kong) C Wong	7^{9}	3	[10]
(Argentina) F Comesaña (Argentina) TM Etcheverry	6^{7}	6	[6]
PR	(Bosnia and Herzegovina) T Brkić (Bosnia and Herzegovina) D Džumhur	3	3
3	(Germany) C Frantzen (Netherlands) R Haase	6	6
(Serbia) M Kecmanović (France) A Müller	6^{3}	4
(Italy) L Musetti (Italy) L Sonego	7^{7}	6
(Chinese Taipei) R Ho (Germany) H Jebens	3	6^{4}
2	(Austria) A Erler (United States) R Galloway	6	7^{7}

Quarterfinals
(United States) V Kirkov (Netherlands) B Stevens	2	6	[10]
(Ecuador) G Escobar (Mexico) MÁ Reyes-Varela	6	2	[3]
K Khachanov; A Rublev	6	3	[10]
(France) T Arribagé (France) A Olivetti	3	6	[4]
WC	(Canada) G Diallo (Hong Kong) C Wong	7^{8}	6^{5}	[10]
3	(Germany) C Frantzen (Netherlands) R Haase	6^{4}	7^{7}	[8]
(Italy) L Musetti (Italy) L Sonego	5	6	[10]
2	(Austria) A Erler (United States) R Galloway	7	3	[4]

Semifinals
(United States) V Kirkov (Netherlands) B Stevens	5	6	[8]
K Khachanov; A Rublev	7	3	[10]
WC	(Canada) G Diallo (Hong Kong) C Wong
(Italy) L Musetti (Italy) L Sonego	w/o

Final
K Khachanov; A Rublev	4	6	[1]
(Italy) L Musetti (Italy) L Sonego	6	2	[10]
