= 2014 Hong Kong Tennis Open – Doubles =

Doubles
- 2014 Hong Kong Tennis Open

Final
- Champion: (Czech Republic) Karolína Plíšková (Czech Republic) Kristýna Plíšková
- Runner-up: (Austria) Patricia Mayr-Achleitner (Australia) Arina Rodionova
- Score: 6–2, 2–6, [12–10]

Events
Singles	Doubles
Hong Kong Tennis Open	· 2015 →

This was the first edition of Hong Kong Tennis Open.

Karolína and Kristýna Plíšková won the title, defeating Patricia Mayr-Achleitner and Arina Rodionova in the final, 6–2, 2–6, [12–10].

== Seeds ==
1. (Chinese Taipei) Chan Hao-ching / (Chinese Taipei) Chan Yung-jan (semifinals)
2. (Slovenia) Andreja Klepač / (Romania) Monica Niculescu (first round)
3. (Czech Republic) Karolína Plíšková / (Czech Republic) Kristýna Plíšková (champions)
4. (Slovakia) Janette Husárová / (China) Zheng Saisai (first round)

== Draw ==
=== Key ===
- Q = Qualifier
- WC = Wild card
- LL = Lucky loser
- Alt = Alternate
- SE = Special exempt
- PR = Protected ranking
- ITF = ITF entry
- JE = Junior exempt
- w/o = Walkover
- r = Retired
- d = Defaulted
- SR = Special ranking

First round
1	(Chinese Taipei) H-c Chan (Chinese Taipei) Y-j Chan	4	6	[10]
WC	(Poland) M Linette (Hong Kong) L Zhang	6	4	[2]
(China) X Han (Croatia) P Martić	1	6^{4}
(Chinese Taipei) C-j Chuang (Japan) J Namigata	6	7^{7}
3	(Czech Republic) Ka Plíšková (Czech Republic) Kr Plíšková	6	6
WC	(Hong Kong) V Chan (Hong Kong) H-c Wu	3	4
(Chinese Taipei) C-w Chan (China) Y Xu	3	6	[10]
(Japan) S Aoyama (Romania) R Olaru	6	3	[8]
(Chinese Taipei) S-y Hsieh (Chinese Taipei) S-w Hsieh	6	6
(Israel) J Glushko (Belgium) Y Wickmayer	4	3
(Austria) P Mayr-Achleitner (Australia) A Rodionova	1	6	[11]
4	(Slovakia) J Husárová (China) S Zheng	6	3	[9]
(United Kingdom) J Rae (United Kingdom) A Smith	6^{8}	5
(France) P Parmentier (France) L Thorpe	7^{10}	7
(China) Y Wang (China) J Zheng	6	6
2	(Slovenia) A Klepač (Romania) M Niculescu	4	2

Quarterfinals
1	(Chinese Taipei) H-c Chan (Chinese Taipei) Y-j Chan	6	6
(Chinese Taipei) C-j Chuang (Japan) J Namigata	1	3
3	(Czech Republic) Ka Plíšková (Czech Republic) Kr Plíšková	6	6
(Chinese Taipei) C-w Chan (China) Y Xu	1	3
(Chinese Taipei) S-y Hsieh (Chinese Taipei) S-w Hsieh	6	6^{3}	[3]
(Austria) P Mayr-Achleitner (Australia) A Rodionova	4	7^{7}	[10]
(France) P Parmentier (France) L Thorpe	2	3
(China) Y Wang (China) J Zheng	6	6

Semifinals
1	(Chinese Taipei) H-c Chan (Chinese Taipei) Y-j Chan	4	6	[6]
3	(Czech Republic) Ka Plíšková (Czech Republic) Kr Plíšková	6	4	[10]
(Austria) P Mayr-Achleitner (Australia) A Rodionova	6	0	[10]
(China) Y Wang (China) J Zheng	4	6	[7]

Final
3	(Czech Republic) Ka Plíšková (Czech Republic) Kr Plíšková	6	2	[12]
(Austria) P Mayr-Achleitner (Australia) A Rodionova	2	6	[10]
