= 2026 Hong Kong Tennis Open – Singles =

Singles
- 2026 Hong Kong Tennis Open

Final
- Champion: (United States) Claire Liu
- Runner-up: (Philippines) Alexandra Eala
- Score: 6–3, 6–0
- Date: 8 November 2026

Details
- Draw: 32 (4Q / 4WC)
- Seeds: 8

Events
| Singles | Doubles |
- Hong Kong Tennis Open

At the 2026 Hong Kong Tennis Open, Claire Liu defeated Alexandra Eala in the final, 6–3, 6–0, to win the women's singles tennis title. The tournament took place on outdoor hard courts in Hong Kong, China, and was a WTA 250-level event. Liu did not lose a set en route to her first WTA Tour singles title.

Victoria Mboko was the reigning champion, but did not participate this year due to a knee injury.

== Seeds ==
1. (Romania) Sorana Cîrstea (quarterfinals)
2. (Philippines) Alexandra Eala (final)
3. (Canada) Leylah Fernandez (withdrew)
4. (Greece) Maria Sakkari (semifinals)
5. (Australia) Talia Gibson (second round)
6. (China) Wang Xinyu (second round)
7. Liudmila Samsonova (first round)
8. (United Kingdom) Katie Boulter (second round)

== Draw ==
Key

- Q = Qualifier
- WC = Wild card
- LL = Lucky loser
- Alt = Alternate
- ITF = ITF entry
- PR = Protected ranking
- SR = Special ranking
- SE = Special exempt
- JE = Junior exempt
- JR = Junior Accelerator Programme entrant
- CO = College Accelerator Programme entrant
- NG = Next Gen Accelerator Program entrant
- w/o = Walkover
- r = Retired
- d = Defaulted

=== Finals ===
Semifinals
Q | Alexandra Shubladze | 5 | 4
(United States) Claire Liu | 7 | 6
4 | (Greece) Maria Sakkari | 5 | 6 | 4
2 | (Philippines) Alexandra Eala | 7 | 3 | 6

Final
(United States) Claire Liu | 6 | 6
2 | (Philippines) Alexandra Eala | 3 | 0

=== Top half ===
First round
1 | (Romania) S Cîrstea | 7^{8} | 1 | 7
(Uzbekistan) M Timofeeva | 6^{6} | 6 | 5
WC | (United States) V Williams | 2 | 3
(United States) M Stoiana | 6 | 6
LL | E Pridankina | 7 | 0
(Spain) P Badosa | 5 | 0^{r}
Q | A Shubladze | 5 | 6 | 6
7 | L Samsonova | 7 | 1 | 2
LL | (United Kingdom) M Stojsavljevic | 6 | 4 | 6
(United States) S Kenin | 3 | 6 | 4
(Ukraine) D Yastremska | 4 | 2
(Turkey) Z Sönmez | 6 | 6
(United States) C Liu | 6 | 6
Q | T Prozorova | 2 | 4
(Switzerland) V Golubic | 2 | 6^{2}
8 | (United Kingdom) K Boulter | 6 | 7^{7}

Second round
1 | (Romania) S Cîrstea | 7 | 6
(United States) M Stoiana | 5 | 1
LL | E Pridankina | 7^{8} | 1 | 3
Q | A Shubladze | 6^{6} | 6 | 6
LL | (United Kingdom) M Stojsavljevic | 6^{5} | 4
(Turkey) Z Sönmez | 7^{7} | 6
(United States) C Liu | 7 | 6
8 | (United Kingdom) K Boulter | 5 | 4

Quarterfinals
1 | (Romania) S Cîrstea | 2 | 3
Q | A Shubladze | 6 | 6
(Turkey) Z Sönmez | 1 | 4
(United States) C Liu | 6 | 6

Semifinals
Q | A Shubladze | 5 | 4
(United States) C Liu | 7 | 6

=== Bottom half ===
First round
5 | (Australia) T Gibson | 7^{7} | 6
(Ukraine) O Oliynykova | 6^{5} | 1
(United States) K Volynets | 3 | 2
Q | A Sasnovich | 6 | 6
WC | (Australia) M Inglis | 5 | 2
(Australia) M Joint | 7 | 6
LL | (United States) CYS Lee | 1 | 4
4 | (Greece) M Sakkari | 6 | 6
6 | (China) Xin Wang | 6 | 6
WC | (Hong Kong) A Karunaratne | 1 | 1
(Croatia) A Ružić | 7^{7} | 6
(Armenia) A Charaeva | 6^{5} | 4
Q | (Japan) H Sakatsume | 3 | 5
(Czech Republic) T Valentová | 6 | 7
LL | (Australia) E Jones | 4 | 3
2 | (Philippines) A Eala | 6 | 6

Second round
5 | (Australia) T Gibson | 1 | 7 | 6^{7}
Q | A Sasnovich | 6 | 5 | 7^{9}
(Australia) M Joint | 6 | 3 | 3
4 | (Greece) M Sakkari | 4 | 6 | 6
6 | (China) Xin Wang | 3 | 6 | 2
(Croatia) A Ružić | 6 | 4 | 6
(Czech Republic) T Valentová | 4 | 6^{7}
2 | (Philippines) A Eala | 6 | 7^{9}

Quarterfinals
Q | A Sasnovich | 2 | 3
4 | (Greece) M Sakkari | 6 | 6
(Croatia) A Ružić | 6^{7} | 5
2 | (Philippines) A Eala | 7^{9} | 7

Semifinals
4 | (Greece) M Sakkari | 5 | 6 | 4
2 | (Philippines) A Eala | 7 | 3 | 6

== Qualifying ==
=== Seeds ===
1. Aliaksandra Sasnovich (qualified)
2. (Japan) Himeno Sakatsume (qualified)
3. Tatiana Prozorova (qualified)
4. (Australia) Emerson Jones (qualifying competition, lucky loser)
5. Alexandra Shubladze (qualified)
6. (United States) Carol Young Suh Lee (qualifying competition, lucky loser)
7. Alevtina Ibragimova (first round)
8. (Georgia (country)) Ekaterine Gorgodze (first round)

=== Qualifiers ===
1. Aliaksandra Sasnovich
2. (Japan) Himeno Sakatsume
3. Tatiana Prozorova
4. Alexandra Shubladze

=== Lucky losers ===
1. (United States) Carol Young Suh Lee
2. Elena Pridankina
3. (Australia) Emerson Jones
4. (United Kingdom) Mika Stojsavljevic

=== Qualifying draw ===
==== First qualifier ====
First round
1 | Aliaksandra Sasnovich | 6 | 6
(Hong Kong) Shek Cheuk-ying | 4 | 2
WC | (Hong Kong) Lai Ching-laam | 1 | 2
6 | (United States) Carol Young Suh Lee | 6 | 6

Qualifying competition
1 | Aliaksandra Sasnovich | 6 | 6
6 | (United States) Carol Young Suh Lee | 2 | 1

==== Second qualifier ====
First round
2 | (Japan) Himeno Sakatsume | 6 | 6
(Hong Kong) Cody Wong | 4 | 2
Elena Pridankina | 6 | 4 | 6
8 | (Georgia (country)) Ekaterine Gorgodze | 1 | 6 | 1

Qualifying competition
2 | (Japan) Himeno Sakatsume | 5 | 6 | 6
Elena Pridankina | 7 | 2 | 2

==== Third qualifier ====
First round
3 | Tatiana Prozorova | 6 | 6
(Japan) Hayu Kinoshita | 1 | 1
(United Kingdom) Mika Stojsavljevic | 1 | 6 | 6
7 | Alevtina Ibragimova | 6 | 2 | 1

Qualifying competition
3 | Tatiana Prozorova | 6 | 6
(United Kingdom) Mika Stojsavljevic | 4 | 1

==== Fourth qualifier ====
First round
4 | (Australia) Emerson Jones | 6 | 6
(United Kingdom) Heather Watson | 1 | 4
(China) Zhang Ying | 4 | 3
5 | Alexandra Shubladze | 6 | 6

Qualifying competition
4 | (Australia) Emerson Jones | 4 | 2
5 | Alexandra Shubladze | 6 | 6
