= 2015 Hong Kong Tennis Open – Doubles =

Doubles
- 2015 Hong Kong Tennis Open

Final
- Champions: (France) Alizé Cornet (Kazakhstan) Yaroslava Shvedova
- Runners-up: (Spain) Lara Arruabarrena (Slovenia) Andreja Klepač
- Score: 7–5, 6–4

Events
Singles	Doubles
← 2014 ·	Hong Kong Tennis Open	· 2016 →

Karolína and Kristýna Plíšková were the defending champions, but chose not to participate.
Alizé Cornet and Yaroslava Shvedova won the title, defeating Lara Arruabarrena and Andreja Klepač in the final, 7–5, 6–4.

== Seeds ==
1. (Spain) Lara Arruabarrena / (Slovenia) Andreja Klepač (final)
2. (Poland) Klaudia Jans-Ignacik / (Australia) Anastasia Rodionova (semifinals)
3. (China) Liang Chen / (China) Wang Yafan (semifinals)
4. (France) Alizé Cornet / (Kazakhstan) Yaroslava Shvedova (champions)

== Draw ==
=== Key ===
- Q = Qualifier
- WC = Wild card
- LL = Lucky loser
- Alt = Alternate
- SE = Special exempt
- PR = Protected ranking
- ITF = ITF entry
- JE = Junior exempt
- w/o = Walkover
- r = Retired
- d = Defaulted
- SR = Special ranking

First round
1	(Spain) L Arruabarrena (Slovenia) A Klepač	w/o
(United States) C McHale (Hong Kong) L Zhang
WC	(Hong Kong) Y-t Ki (Hong Kong) M Ng	w/o
(Chinese Taipei) K-c Chang (Japan) M Kato
3	(China) C Liang (China) Y Wang	7	6
(Australia) J Gajdošová (United Kingdom) H Watson	5	2
(United States) L Davis (Japan) K Nara	4	3
(Chinese Taipei) C-w Chan (Chinese Taipei) Y-h Lee	6	6
WC	(Hong Kong) C-w Sher (Hong Kong) H-c Wu	3	3
(Chinese Taipei) C-j Chuang (Thailand) L Kumkhum	6	6
(Spain) L Pous Tió (France) I Ramialison	6^{1}	0
4	(France) A Cornet (Kazakhstan) Y Shvedova	7^{7}	6
(Ukraine) Y Beygelzimer (United States) I Falconi	2	4
(Thailand) N Lertpitaksinchai (Thailand) P Plipuech	6	6
(China) C Liu (China) K Zhang	7^{7}	2	[5]
2	(Poland) K Jans-Ignacik (Australia) An Rodionova	6^{3}	6	[10]

Quarterfinals
1	(Spain) L Arruabarrena (Slovenia) A Klepač	6	6
WC	(Hong Kong) Y-t Ki (Hong Kong) M Ng	1	0
3	(China) C Liang (China) Y Wang	w/o
(Chinese Taipei) C-w Chan (Chinese Taipei) Y-h Lee
(Chinese Taipei) C-j Chuang (Thailand) L Kumkhum	2	6^{3}
4	(France) A Cornet (Kazakhstan) Y Shvedova	6	7^{7}
(Thailand) N Lertpitaksinchai (Thailand) P Plipuech	4	0
2	(Poland) K Jans-Ignacik (Australia) An Rodionova	6	6

Semifinals
1	(Spain) L Arruabarrena (Slovenia) A Klepač	2	6	[10]
3	(China) C Liang (China) Y Wang	6	2	[5]
4	(France) A Cornet (Kazakhstan) Y Shvedova	6	6
2	(Poland) K Jans-Ignacik (Australia) An Rodionova	4	4

Final
1	(Spain) L Arruabarrena (Slovenia) A Klepač	5	4
4	(France) A Cornet (Kazakhstan) Y Shvedova	7	6
