= 2015 Hong Kong Tennis Open – Singles =

Singles
- 2015 Hong Kong Tennis Open

Final
- Champion: (Serbia) Jelena Janković
- Runner-up: (Germany) Angelique Kerber
- Score: 3–6, 7–6^{(7–4)}, 6–1

Details
- Draw: 32
- Seeds: 8

Events
Singles	Doubles
- Hong Kong Tennis Open

Sabine Lisicki was the defending champion, but she withdrew before the tournament began due to a knee injury.

Jelena Janković won the title, defeating Angelique Kerber in the final, 3–6, 7–6^{(7–4)}, 6–1. It was her 15th WTA Tour title.

== Seeds ==
1. (Spain) Garbiñe Muguruza (withdrew, left ankle injury)
2. (Germany) Angelique Kerber (final)
3. (United States) Venus Williams (semifinals)
4. (Serbia) Jelena Janković (champion)
5. (Australia) Samantha Stosur (semifinals)
6. (Russia) Daria Gavrilova (quarterfinals)
7. (France) Caroline Garcia (quarterfinals)
8. (France) Alizé Cornet (quarterfinals)

== Draw ==
Key

- Q = Qualifier
- WC = Wild card
- LL = Lucky loser
- Alt = Alternate
- ITF = ITF entry
- PR = Protected ranking
- SR = Special ranking
- SE = Special exempt
- JE = Junior exempt
- JR = Junior Accelerator Programme entrant
- CO = College Accelerator Programme entrant
- NG = Next Gen Accelerator Program entrant
- w/o = Walkover
- r = Retired
- d = Defaulted

=== Finals ===
Semifinals
3	(United States) Venus Williams	4	5
4/WC	(Serbia) Jelena Janković	6	7
5/WC	(Australia) Samantha Stosur	2	2
2/WC	(Germany) Angelique Kerber	6	6

Final
4/WC	(Serbia) Jelena Janković	3	7^{7}	6
2/WC	(Germany) Angelique Kerber	6	6^{4}	1

=== Top half ===
First round
3	(United States) V Williams	2	6	6
LL	(Ukraine) Y Beygelzimer	6	4	4
(China) Y Wang	6	4
(United States) C McHale	3	1^{r}
(Australia) J Gajdošová	4	4
(Kazakhstan) Y Shvedova	6	6
Q	(Ukraine) K Kozlova	4	0
8	(France) A Cornet	6	6
4/WC	(Serbia) J Janković	6	6
Q	(Romania) A Bogdan	4	2
Q	(France) I Ramialison	4	5
(Australia) An Rodionova	6	7
(United States) I Falconi	4	3
(Spain) L Arruabarrena	6	6
Q	(Japan) M Kato	7^{8}	5	3
6	(Russia) D Gavrilova	6^{6}	7	6

Second round
3	(United States) V Williams	6	6
(China) Y Wang	0	2
(Kazakhstan) Y Shvedova	7^{7}	3	4
8	(France) A Cornet	6^{4}	6	6
4/WC	(Serbia) J Janković	6	6
(Australia) An Rodionova	0	2
(Spain) L Arruabarrena	6^{4}	1
6	(Russia) D Gavrilova	7^{7}	6

Quarterfinals
3	(United States) V Williams	6	6
8	(France) A Cornet	1	1
4/WC	(Serbia) J Janković	6	6
6	(Russia) D Gavrilova	1	1

Semifinals
3	(United States) V Williams	4	5
4/WC	(Serbia) J Janković	6	7

=== Bottom half ===
First round
(United Kingdom) H Watson	3	6	6
(China) K Zhang	6	1	2
Q	(Chinese Taipei) Y-h Lee	6	6
Q	(South Korea) S-j Jang	3	1
(Thailand) L Kumkhum	1	2
(Puerto Rico) M Puig	6	6
(Japan) R Ozaki	3	1
5/WC	(Australia) S Stosur	6	6
7	(France) C Garcia	6	6
(United States) L Davis	1	3
(Chinese Taipei) K-c Chang	4	5
LL	(Russia) A Komardina	6	7
(Japan) K Nara	6	6
WC	(Hong Kong) L Zhang	0	3
(Italy) F Schiavone	7^{7}	2	3
2/WC	(Germany) A Kerber	6^{4}	6	6

Second round
(United Kingdom) H Watson	6	6^{5}	6
Q	(Chinese Taipei) Y-h Lee	0	7^{7}	4
(Puerto Rico) M Puig	4	4
5/WC	(Australia) S Stosur	6	6
7	(France) C Garcia	6	6
LL	(Russia) A Komardina	0	2
(Japan) K Nara	2	2
2/WC	(Germany) A Kerber	6	6

Quarterfinals
(United Kingdom) H Watson	6	3	0
5/WC	(Australia) S Stosur	4	6	6
7	(France) C Garcia	5	3
2/WC	(Germany) A Kerber	7	6

Semifinals
5/WC	(Australia) S Stosur	2	2
2/WC	(Germany) A Kerber	6	6

== Qualifying ==
=== Seeds ===
1. (Romania) Ana Bogdan (qualified)
2. (Ukraine) Kateryna Kozlova (qualified)
3. (Spain) Laura Pous Tió (first round)
4. (Ukraine) Yuliya Beygelzimer (qualifying competition, lucky loser)
5. (Japan) Miyu Kato (qualified)
6. (South Korea) Jang Su-jeong (qualified)
7. (Russia) Anastasiya Komardina (qualifying competition, lucky loser)
8. (China) Liu Chang (qualifying competition)
9. (India) Ankita Raina (first round)
10. (Chinese Taipei) Lee Ya-hsuan (qualified)
11. (Australia) Anastasia Rodionova (moved to main draw)
12. (France) Irina Ramialison (qualified)
13. (South Africa) Chanel Simmonds (qualifying competition)

=== Qualifiers ===
1. (Romania) Ana Bogdan
2. (Ukraine) Kateryna Kozlova
3. (Chinese Taipei) Lee Ya-hsuan
4. (France) Irina Ramialison
5. (Japan) Miyu Kato
6. (South Korea) Jang Su-jeong

=== Lucky losers ===
1. (Ukraine) Yuliya Beygelzimer
2. (Russia) Anastasiya Komardina

=== Draw ===
==== First qualifier ====
First round
1	(Romania) Ana Bogdan	6^{1}	6	6
(Japan) Mizuno Kijima	7^{7}	4	1
WC	(Hong Kong) Ki Yan-tung	2	0
13	(South Africa) Chanel Simmonds	6	6

Qualifying competition
1	(Romania) Ana Bogdan	6	6
13	(South Africa) Chanel Simmonds	3	2

==== Second qualifier ====
First round
2	(Ukraine) Kateryna Kozlova	6	6
WC	(Hong Kong) Ng Kwan-yau	1	0
WC	(Hong Kong) Maggie Ng	4	3
8	(China) Liu Chang	6	6

Qualifying competition
2	(Ukraine) Kateryna Kozlova	6	6
8	(China) Liu Chang	2	2

==== Third qualifier ====
First round
3	(Spain) Laura Pous Tió	0	3
(Serbia) Doroteja Erić	6	6
Alt	(Slovenia) Andreja Klepač	0	6	5
10	(Chinese Taipei) Lee Ya-hsuan	6	3	7

Qualifying competition
(Serbia) Doroteja Erić	4	1
10	(Chinese Taipei) Lee Ya-hsuan	6	6

==== Fourth qualifier ====
First round
4	(Ukraine) Yuliya Beygelzimer	6	7^{7}
(Thailand) Nicha Lertpitaksinchai	2	6^{3}
(India) Sri Peddi Reddy	4	1
12	(France) Irina Ramialison	6	6

Qualifying competition
4	(Ukraine) Yuliya Beygelzimer	4	6	5
12	(France) Irina Ramialison	6	2	7

==== Fifth qualifier ====
First round
5	(Japan) Miyu Kato	6	6
WC	(Hong Kong) Wu Ho-ching	3	1
WC	(China) Shao Yijia	2	3
7	(Russia) Anastasiya Komardina	6	6

Qualifying competition
5	(Japan) Miyu Kato	7	6
7	(Russia) Anastasiya Komardina	5	0

==== Sixth qualifier ====
First round
6	(South Korea) Jang Su-jeong	6	4	6
(Croatia) Silvia Njirić	1	6	0
(Thailand) Peangtarn Plipuech	1	6	6
9	(India) Ankita Raina	6	3	1

Qualifying competition
6	(South Korea) Jang Su-jeong	6	6
(Thailand) Peangtarn Plipuech	3	4
