= 2002 Hong Kong Open – Singles =

Singles
- 2002 Hong Kong Open
- 2001 Champion: (Chile) Marcelo Ríos

Final
- Champion: (Spain) Juan Carlos Ferrero
- Runner-up: (Spain) Carlos Moyá
- Score: 6–3, 1–6, 7–6^{(7–4)}

Details
- Draw: 32
- Seeds: 8

Events
Singles	Doubles
- Hong Kong Open

Juan Carlos Ferrero defeated Carlos Moyá in the final, 6–3, 1–6, 7–6^{(7–4)} to win the singles tennis title at the 2002 Hong Kong Open.

Marcelo Ríos was the reigning champion, but did not compete that year.

== Seeds ==
A champion seed is indicated in bold text while text in italics indicates the round in which that seed was eliminated.

1. (Russia) Marat Safin (second round)
2. (Spain) **Juan Carlos Ferrero (champion)**
3. (Spain) Carlos Moyá (final)
4. (Spain) Àlex Corretja (second round)
5. (Argentina) Juan Ignacio Chela (quarterfinals)
6. n/a
7. (Ecuador) Nicolás Lapentti (second round)
8. (Thailand) Paradorn Srichaphan (first round)

== Draw ==
Key

- Q = Qualifier
- WC = Wild card
- LL = Lucky loser
- Alt = Alternate
- ITF = ITF entry
- PR = Protected ranking
- SR = Special ranking
- SE = Special exempt
- JE = Junior exempt
- JR = Junior Accelerator Programme entrant
- CO = College Accelerator Programme entrant
- NG = Next Gen Accelerator Program entrant
- w/o = Walkover
- r = Retired
- d = Defaulted

First round
1	(Russia) **M Safin**	**6**	**6**
(Germany) L Burgsmüller	2	2
(Spain) **F López**	3	**6**	**7^{7}**
(Slovakia) D Hrbatý	**6**	3	6^{3}
WC	(United States) C Mamiit	**6**	5	3
(Sweden) **J Björkman**	4	**7**	**6**
(Argentina) A Calleri	5	2
7	(Ecuador) **N Lapentti**	**7**	**6**
3	(Spain) **C Moyá**	**6**	3	**6**
(United States) J-M Gambill	4	**6**	3
(Australia) **W Arthurs**	**6**	6^{5}	**6**
(Czech Republic) J Vacek	4	**7^{7}**	4
(Spain) **F Clavet**	**6**	**6**
Q	(Sweden) M Larsson	4	4
(United States) **T Dent**	**6**	0	**7**
8	(Thailand) P Srichaphan	4	**6**	5
5	(Argentina) **J I Chela**	**6**	**6**
WC	(Sweden) M Norman	3	4
(Czech Republic) R Štěpánek	5	2
(Chile) **N Massú**	**7**	**6**
(Slovakia) K Kučera	3	3
(France) **J Golmard**	**6**	**6**
WC	(United States) M Chang	6^{6}	4
4	(Spain) **À Corretja**	**7^{8}**	**6**
LL	(France) **A Dupuis**	**6**	3	**7**
Q	(Germany) M Kohlmann	4	**6**	5
(South Korea) **H-T Lee**	**7**	4	**6**
(Austria) J Knowle	5	**6**	1
Q	(United States) **J Morrison**	**6**	**6**
Q	(Japan) T Suzuki	2	2
(Austria) S Koubek	2	4
2	(Spain) **J C Ferrero**	**6**	**6**

Second round
1	(Russia) M Safin	6^{2}	5
(Spain) **F López**	**7^{7}**	**7**
(Sweden) **J Björkman**	**6**	**6**
7	(Ecuador) N Lapentti	2	2
3	(Spain) **C Moyá**	**6**	**6**
(Australia) W Arthurs	4	4
(Spain) **F Clavet**	**6**	**7^{7}**
(United States) T Dent	4	6
5	(Argentina) **J I Chela**	1	**6**	**6**
(Chile) N Massú	**6**	2	2
(France) **J Golmard**	**6**	2	**7^{7}**
4	(Spain) À Corretja	3	**6**	6^{2}
LL	(France) **A Dupuis**	**6**	**6**
(South Korea) H-T Lee	3	3
Q	(United States) J Morrison	6^{3}	1
2	(Spain) **J C Ferrero**	**7^{7}**	**6**

Quarterfinals
(Spain) F López	3	3
(Sweden) **J Björkman**	**6**	**6**
3	(Spain) **C Moyá**	**6**	3	**6**
(Spain) F Clavet	4	**6**	1
5	(Argentina) J I Chela	4	4
(France) **J Golmard**	**6**	**6**
LL	(France) A Dupuis	4	4
2	(Spain) **J C Ferrero**	**6**	**6**

Semifinals
(Sweden) J Björkman	4	6^{1}
3	(Spain) **C Moyá**	**6**	**7^{7}**
(France) J Golmard	4	1
2	(Spain) **J C Ferrero**	**6**	**6**

Final
3	(Spain) Carlos Moyá	3	**6**	6^{4}
2	(Spain) **J C Ferrero**	**6**	1	**7^{7}**
