= 2014 Hong Kong Tennis Open =

- Date: September 8–14
- Edition: 5th
- Category: WTA International
- Draw: 32S/32Q/16D
- Prize money: $250,000
- Surface: Hard
- Location: Hong Kong

Champions

Singles
- (Germany) Sabine Lisicki

Doubles
- (Czech Republic) Karolína Plíšková / (Czech Republic) Kristýna Plíšková
- Hong Kong Tennis Open

The 2014 Hong Kong Tennis Open was a women's professional tennis tournament played on hard courts. It was part of the 2014 WTA Tour and a return of the Hong Kong Open women's tennis tournament last held in 1993. It took place in Victoria Park, Hong Kong, from September 8 to 14.

== Points and prize money ==
=== Point distribution ===
Event	W	F	SF	QF	Round of 16	Round of 32	Q	Q2	Q1
Singles	280	180	110	60	30	1	18	12	1
Doubles	280	180	110	60	1	—N/a	—N/a	—N/a	—N/a

=== Prize money ===
Event	W	F	SF	QF	Round of 16	Round of 32^{1}	Q2	Q1
Singles	$111,163	$55,323	$29,730	$8,934	$4,928	$3,199	$1,852	$1,081
Doubles *	$17,724	$9,222	$4,951	$2,623	$1,383	—N/a	—N/a	—N/a

_{^{1} Qualifiers prize money is also the Round of 32 prize money}
_{* per team}

== Singles main-draw entrants ==
=== Seeds ===
Country	Player	Rank^{1}	Seed
GER	Sabine Lisicki	28	1
SVK	Daniela Hantuchová	37	2
CZE	Karolína Plíšková	42	3
USA	Christina McHale	44	4
CHN	Zheng Jie	57	5
BEL	Yanina Wickmayer	64	6
SVK	Jana Čepelová	65	7
SVK	Anna Schmiedlová	67	8

- ^{1} Rankings are as of August 25, 2014

=== Other entrants ===
The following players received wildcards into the singles main draw:

- (China) Duan Yingying
- (Germany) Sabine Lisicki
- (Hong Kong) Zhang Ling

The following players received entry from the qualifying draw:

- (Australia) Jarmila Gajdošová
- (Russia) Elizaveta Kulichkova
- (China) Zhang Kailin
- (China) Zhu Lin

The following player received entry as a lucky loser:

- (Japan) Misa Eguchi

=== Withdrawals ===
Before the tournament

- (Kazakhstan) Zarina Diyas → replaced by (United States) Grace Min
- (United States) Vania King → replaced by (Israel) Julia Glushko
- (Japan) Kurumi Nara → replaced by (Japan) Kimiko Date-Krumm
- (China) Peng Shuai (heat illness) → replaced by (Japan) Misa Eguchi
- (Spain) Sílvia Soler Espinosa → replaced by (Belgium) Alison Van Uytvanck
- (Ukraine) Elina Svitolina → replaced by (Czech Republic) Kristýna Plíšková
- (Czech Republic) Barbora Záhlavová-Strýcová → replaced by (Thailand) Luksika Kumkhum
- (China) Zhang Shuai → replaced by (China) Zheng Saisai

=== Retirements ===
- (Japan) Kimiko Date-Krumm

== Doubles main-draw entrants ==
=== Seeds ===
Country	Player	Country	Player	Rank^{1}	Seed
TPE	Chan Hao-ching	TPE	Chan Yung-jan	55	1
SLO	Andreja Klepač	ROU	Monica Niculescu	83	2
CZE	Karolína Plíšková	CZE	Kristýna Plíšková	111	3
SVK	Janette Husárová	CHN	Zheng Saisai	127	4

^{1} Rankings are as of August 25, 2014

=== Other entrants ===
The following pairs received wildcards into the doubles main draw:

- (Hong Kong) Venise Chan / (Hong Kong) Wu Ho-ching
- (Poland) Magda Linette / (Hong Kong) Zhang Ling

== Champions ==
=== Singles ===
- (Germany) Sabine Lisicki defeated (Czech Republic) Karolína Plíšková, 7–5, 6–3

=== Doubles ===
- (Czech Republic) Karolína Plíšková / (Czech Republic) Kristýna Plíšková defeated (Austria) Patricia Mayr-Achleitner / (Australia) Arina Rodionova, 6–2, 2–6, [12–10]
