= 2002 Hong Kong Open – Doubles =

Doubles
- 2002 Hong Kong Open

Final
- Champions: (United States) Jan-Michael Gambill (United States) Graydon Oliver
- Runners-up: (Australia) Wayne Arthurs (Australia) Andrew Kratzmann
- Score: 6–7^{(2–7)}, 6–4, 7–6^{(7–4)}

Details
- Draw: 16
- Seeds: 4

Events
Singles	Doubles
- Hong Kong Open

Karsten Braasch and André Sá were the defending champions but did not compete that year.

Jan-Michael Gambill and Graydon Oliver won in the final 6–7 (2–7), 6–4, 7–6 (7–4) against Wayne Arthurs and Andrew Kratzmann.

== Seeds ==
Champion seeds are indicated in bold text while text in italics indicates the round in which those seeds were eliminated.

1. (India) Mahesh Bhupathi / (Sweden) Jonas Björkman (first round)
2. (Australia) Joshua Eagle / (Australia) Sandon Stolle (quarterfinals)
3. (Australia) Michael Hill / (India) Leander Paes (quarterfinals)
4. (South Africa) David Adams / (United States) Brian MacPhie (first round)

== Draw ==
Key

- Q = Qualifier
- WC = Wild card
- LL = Lucky loser
- Alt = Alternate
- ITF = ITF entry
- PR = Protected ranking
- SR = Special ranking
- SE = Special exempt
- JE = Junior exempt
- JR = Junior Accelerator Programme entrant
- CO = College Accelerator Programme entrant
- NG = Next Gen Accelerator Program entrant
- w/o = Walkover
- r = Retired
- d = Defaulted

First round
1	(India) M Bhupathi (Sweden) J Björkman	6^{3}	3
(Australia) **W Arthurs** (Australia) **A Kratzmann**	**7^{7}**	**6**
(Spain) **À Corretja** (Ecuador) **N Lapentti**	6^{2}	**6**	**7**
(Japan) T Shimada (United States) J Thomas	**7^{7}**	3	5
3	(Australia) **M Hill** (India) **L Paes**	**7^{7}**	2	**6**
(Australia) N Healey (Australia) J Kerr	6^{3}	**6**	3
WC	(United States) M Chang (Slovakia) D Hrbatý	6^{6}	**7^{9}**	6^{6}
(Austria) **J Knowle** (Germany) **M Kohlmann**	**7^{8}**	6^{7}	**7^{8}**
WC	(Netherlands) **S Groen** (Russia) **M Safin**	**6**	**6**
(United States) R Leach (Australia) D Macpherson	4	4
(Argentina) **J I Chela** (Chile) **N Massú**	**6**	**6**
4	(South Africa) D Adams (United States) B MacPhie	4	4
(Australia) A Florent (Czech Republic) R Štěpánek	5	3
(United States) **J-M Gambill** (United States) **G Oliver**	**7**	**6**
WC	(Hong Kong) J Hui (Australia) A Ross	**6**	1	6^{3}
2	(Australia) **J Eagle** (Australia) **S Stolle**	3	**6**	**7^{7}**

Quarterfinals
(Australia) **W Arthurs** (Australia) **A Kratzmann**	4	**6**	**7^{9}**
(Spain) À Corretja (Ecuador) N Lapentti	**6**	4	6^{7}
3	(Australia) M Hill (India) L Paes	3	3
(Austria) **J Knowle** (Germany) **M Kohlmann**	**6**	**6**
WC	(Netherlands) S Groen (Russia) M Safin
(Argentina) **J I Chela** (Chile) **N Massú**	**w/o**
(United States) **J-M Gambill** (United States) **G Oliver**	**6**	**6**
2	(Australia) J Eagle (Australia) S Stolle	4	4

Semifinals
(Australia) **W Arthurs** (Australia) **A Kratzmann**	**6**	**7^{7}**
(Austria) J Knowle (Germany) M Kohlmann	3	6^{2}
(Argentina) J I Chela (Chile) N Massú	3	5
(United States) **J-M Gambill** (United States) **G Oliver**	**6**	**7**

Final
(Australia) Wayne Arthurs (Australia) Andrew Kratzmann	**7^{7}**	4	6^{4}
(United States) **Jan-Michael Gambill** (United States) **Graydon Oliver**	6^{2}	**6**	**7^{7}**
