= Adithya Karunaratne =

Adithya Karunaratne 李芬
- Country (sports): Hong Kong, China
- Born: 4 December 2001 (age 24)
- Turned pro: 2017
- Plays: Right-handed (two-handed backhand)
- Prize money: US$ 76,044

Singles
- Career record: 227–154 (59.6%)
- Career titles: 5 ITF
- Highest ranking: No. 278 (9 January 2023)
- Current ranking: No. 523 (2 November 2026)

Doubles
- Career record: 47–55 (46.1%)
- Career titles: 2 ITF
- Highest ranking: No. 777 (18 September 2023)
- Current ranking: No. 796 (2 November 2026)
- Last updated on: 4 November 2026.

Adithya Karunaratne (Chinese: 李芬, born 4 December 2001) is a Sri Lankan born female tennis professional tennis player from Hong Kong. She has a career-high singles ranking by the WTA of 278, achieved on 17 January 2023.

== Career ==
In November 2026, Karunaratne received a main-draw wildcard entry to compete at the Hong Kong Tennis Open, where she played against Xinyu Wang in the opening round.

== ITF Circuit finals ==
=== Singles: 8 (5 titles, 3 runner-ups) ===
Legend W25/35 tournaments (2–1) W15 tournaments (3–3)	Legend Hard (4–3) Clay (1–0)

Result	W–L	Date	Tournament	Tier	Surface	Opponent	Score
Loss	0–1	Oct 2021	ITF Monastir, Tunisia	W15	Hard	(Germany) Kathleen Kanev	2–6, 6–7^{(1–7)}
Win	1–1	Nov 2021	ITF Monastir, Tunisia	W15	Hard	(Japan) Lisa-Marie Rioux	6–4, 6–2
Loss	1–2	Nov 2021	ITF Monastir, Tunisia	W15	Hard	(Romania) Ilona Georgiana Ghioroaie	7–6^{(7–5)}, 3–6, 4–6
Win	2–2	May 2022	ITF Monastir, Tunisia	W25	Hard	(Japan) Sakura Hosogi	6–3, 6–3
Win	3–2	Oct 2022	Sozopol, Bulgaria	W25	Hard	(Serbia) Mia Ristić	6–3, 6–1
Loss	3–3	Jan 2024	ITF Sharm El Sheikh, Egypt	W15	Hard	(Slovakia) Katarína Kužmová	3–6, 1–6
Win	4–3	Apr 2026	Monastir, Tunisia	W15	Hard	(Bulgaria) Iva Ivanova	6–4, 6–1
Win	5–3	Jul 2026	Kuršumlijska Banja, Serbia	W15	Clay	(Latvia) Elza Tomase	6–2, 2–6, 6–0
Loss	5–3	Jul 2026	ITF Aldershot, United Kingdom	W35	Hard	(Japan) Rina Saigo	7–5, 2–6, 3–6

=== Doubles: 4 (2 titles, 2 runner-ups) ===
Legend W25/35 tournaments (2–1) W15 tournaments (3–1)	Legend Hard (2–2)

Result	W–L	Date	Tournament	Tier	Surface	Partner	Opponents	Score
Loss	0–1	Mar 2024	ITF Sharm El Sheikh, Egypt	W15	Hard	(Poland) Weronika Ewald	(Slovakia) Salma Drugdová (Poland) Daria Kuczer	4–6, 3–6
Loss	0–2	Jun 2025	ITF Monastir, Tunisia	W15	Hard	(Spain) Claudia Ferrer Pérez	(United States) Lilian Poling (Czech Republic) Zdena Šafářová	2–6, 5–7
Win	1–2	Jun 2025	ITF Monastir, Tunisia	W15	Hard	(Spain) Claudia Ferrer Pérez	(United States) Julia Adams (Lithuania) Andrė Lukošiūtė	7–6^{(7–5)}, 6–1
Win	2–2	Jun 2026	ITF Kuršumlijska Banja, Serbia	W15	Hard	(Latvia) Elza Tomase	(Montenegro) Tea Nikčević (Serbia) Klara Vaja	6–0, 6–0
