= Hong Kong National Grass Court Championships =

Defunct tennis tournament
- Tour: ILTF
- Founded: 1911; 115 years ago
- Abolished: 1976; 50 years ago
- Location: Hong Kong
- Venue: Hong Kong Cricket Club (1911-74) Craigengower Cricket Club (1975-76)
- Surface: Grass- outdoors

The Hong Kong National Grass Court Championships was a combined men's and women's grass court tennis tournament founded in 1911. also known as the Hong Kong Grass Court Tennis Championships. The championships were held at the Hong Cricket Club (HKCC), British Hong Kong from inception until 1974. It was then staged at the Craigengower Cricket Club (CCC) from 1975 to 1976 before it was discontinued.

== History ==
The first National Grass Court Men's Singles Championship was held in 1911 at the Hong Kong Cricket Club and won by Harold Adair Nisbet. In 1918 the first men's Chinese champion was Ng Sze-Kwong, he would win the title a further five times (1918–23). The championships continued through to 1976 when they were abolished.

Notable winners of the men's singles title included; Ip Koon Hung, Dick Dell, and Colin Dibley. Former winners of women's singles title included; Ling Tsui Yuen Yuen, Lita Liem, and Kazuko Sawamatsu.
