= Hong Kong Open (tennis) =

Hong Kong Tennis Open
- 2026 Hong Kong Tennis Open

Tournament information
- Founded: 1973
- Location: Causeway Bay, Hong Kong
- Venue: Victoria Park Centre Court, Victoria Park, Causeway Bay
- Surface: Hard / Outdoors
- Draw: 32S / 16D / 24Q
- Website: hktennisopen.hk hkmenstennisopen.hk

Current champions (2026 ATP, 2026 WTA)
- Men's singles: (Kazakhstan) Alexander Bublik
- Women's singles: (United States) Claire Liu
- Men's doubles: (Italy) Lorenzo Musetti (Italy) Lorenzo Sonego
- Women's doubles: (Chinese Taipei) Chan Hao-ching (Japan) Miyu Kato
ATP Tour
- Category: ATP 250
- Prize money: $700,045 (2026)
WTA Tour
- Category: WTA 250
- Prize money: $283,347

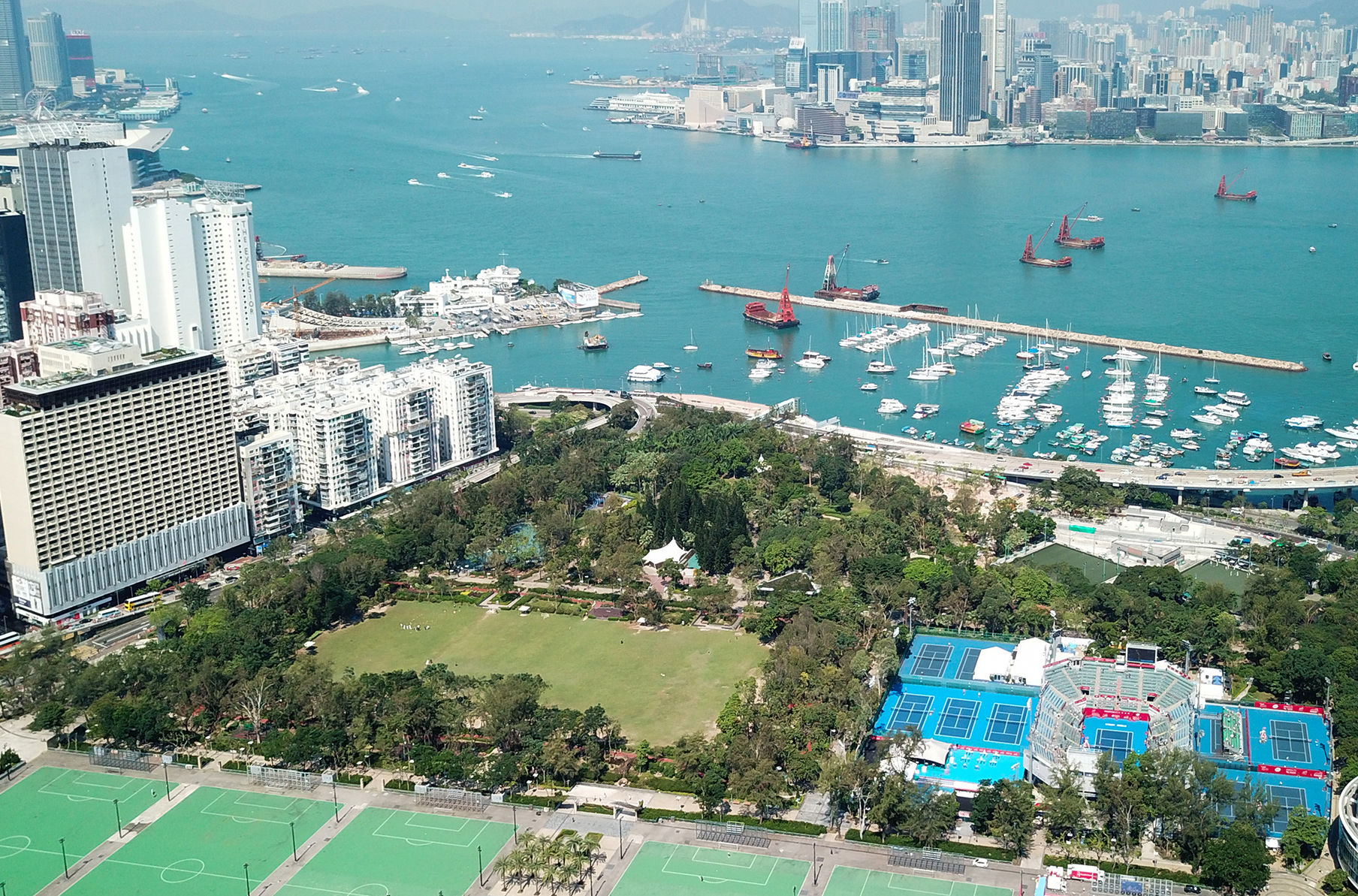
Victoria Park Tennis Centre (right)

The Hong Kong Open (Chinese: 香港網球公開賽) is a professional tennis tournament played annually at the Victoria Park Centre Court in Causeway Bay, Hong Kong. The men's tournament is named the Bank of China Hong Kong Tennis Open, an ATP 250 tournament leading up to the Australian Open, and is held in early January every year starting in 2024. The women's tournament is named the Prudential Hong Kong Tennis Open, a WTA 250 tournament, and is held in early October every year starting in 2014.

The Hong Kong Tennis Open was previously named the Salem Open that began in 1973 and discontinued in 2002. After a 21-year absence, the men's tournament resumed in January 2024. The women's tournament commenced in 1980 and was discontinued two years later. In 1993, the tournament returned for one year before being discontinued until 2014 where it has become a permanent fixture of the Asian swing on the WTA Tour.

== History ==
The Hong Kong Open (also known as the Salem Open) was also previously a men's tennis tournament that was held in Hong Kong on the Grand Prix tour from (1973–1987) and the ATP Tour from (1990–2002). Players competed in the Victoria Park Tennis Centre, on outdoor hard courts. Michael Chang held the record number of wins with three titles.

In 2001, as with legislation restricting tobacco sponsorship, organizers controversially altered its official logo to include the logo of Perrier, causing anti-smoking campaigners to claim that the organizers exploited a loophole in its sponsorship clause.

The men's tournament was replaced in 2003 by the Thailand Open.

A women's competition was also held in Hong Kong from 1980 to 1982; and then once more in 1993, as a Tier IV event on the WTA Tour. Wendy Turnbull won two titles in this competition. Beginning in 2014, the Hong Kong Tennis Open resumed after a two decade absence, sponsored by the Hong Kong-based insurance company Prudential. The tournament was honored as the WTA International Tournament of the Year in 2018.

After the 2018 edition, the tournament was cancelled for 4 years due to the 2019–20 Hong Kong protests in 2019, and the COVID-19 pandemic in Hong Kong from 2020 to 2022. In 2023, the WTA returned to Hong Kong and held its first edition since 2018 in 2023.

As announced by the Association of Tennis Professionals in June 2023, the ATP 250 license belonging to Pune, Maharashtra was relocated to Hong Kong. The first iteration of the tournament took place from 1–7 January on outdoor hard courts with a total prize money of more than $650,000. The tournament, sponsored by the Bank of China (Hong Kong), is expected to be a stop for players on their way to the Australian Open.

== Results ==
=== Men's singles ===
Year	Champion	Runners-up	Score
1973	(Australia) Rod Laver	(United States) Charlie Pasarell	6–3, 3–6, 6–2, 6–2
1974	Not completed due to rain		
1975	(United States) Tom Gorman	(United States) Sandy Mayer	6–3, 6–1, 6–1
1976	(Australia) Ken Rosewall	(Romania) Ilie Năstase	1–6, 6–4, 7–6, 6–0
1977	(Australia) Ken Rosewall (2)	(United States) Tom Gorman	6–3, 5–7, 6–4, 6–4
1978	(United States) Eliot Teltscher	(United States) Pat DuPré	6–4, 6–3, 6–2
1979	(United States) Jimmy Connors	(United States) Pat DuPré	7–5, 6–3, 6–1
1980	(Czechoslovakia) Ivan Lendl	(United States) Brian Teacher	5–7, 7–6, 6–3
1981	(United States) Van Winitsky	(Australia) Mark Edmondson	6–4, 6–7, 6–4
1982	(United States) Pat DuPré	(United States) Morris Skip Strode	6–3, 6–3
1983	(Australia) Wally Masur	(United States) Sammy Giammalva Jr.	6–1, 6–1
1984	(Ecuador) Andrés Gómez	(Czechoslovakia) Tomáš Šmíd	6–3, 6–2
1985	(Ecuador) Andrés Gómez (2)	(United States) Aaron Krickstein	6–3, 6–3, 3–6, 6–4
1986	(India) Ramesh Krishnan	(Ecuador) Andrés Gómez	7–6, 6–0, 7–5
1987	(United States) Eliot Teltscher (2)	(Australia) John Fitzgerald	6–7, 3–6, 6–1, 6–2, 7–5
1988–89	Not held		
1990	(Australia) Pat Cash	(Austria) Alex Antonitsch	6–3, 6–4
1991	(Netherlands) Richard Krajicek	(Australia) Wally Masur	6–2, 3–6, 6–3
1992	(United States) Jim Courier	(United States) Michael Chang	7–5, 6–3
1993	(United States) Pete Sampras	(United States) Jim Courier	6–3, 6–7^{(1–7)}, 7–6^{(7–2)}
1994	(United States) Michael Chang	(Australia) Pat Rafter	6–1, 6–3
1995	(United States) Michael Chang	(Sweden) Jonas Björkman	6–3, 6–1
1996	(United States) Pete Sampras (2)	(United States) Michael Chang	6–4, 3–6, 6–4
1997	(United States) Michael Chang (3)	(Australia) Pat Rafter	6–3, 6–3
1998	(Denmark) Kenneth Carlsen	(Zimbabwe) Byron Black	6–2, 6–0
1999	(United States) Andre Agassi	(Germany) Boris Becker	6–7^{(4–7)}, 6–4, 6–4
2000	(Germany) Nicolas Kiefer	(Australia) Mark Philippoussis	7–6^{(7–4)}, 2–6, 6–2
2001	(Chile) Marcelo Ríos	(Germany) Rainer Schüttler	7–6^{(7–3)}, 6–2
2002	(Spain) Juan Carlos Ferrero	(Spain) Carlos Moyá	6–3, 1–6, 7–6^{(7–4)}
2003–23	Not held		
2024	Andrey Rublev	(Finland) Emil Ruusuvuori	6–4, 6–4
2025	(France) Alexandre Müller	(Japan) Kei Nishikori	2–6, 6–1, 6–3
2026	(Kazakhstan) Alexander Bublik	(Italy) Lorenzo Musetti	7-6^{(7-2)}, 6-3

=== Women's singles ===
Year	Champion	Runners-up	Score
1980	(Australia) Wendy Turnbull	(United States) Marcie Louie	6–0, 6–2
1981	(Australia) Wendy Turnbull (2)	(Italy) Sabina Simmonds	6–3, 6–4
1982	(Sweden) Catrin Jexell	(United States) Alycia Moulton	6–3, 7–5
1983–1992	not held		
1993	(Chinese Taipei) Wang Shi-ting	(United States) Marianne Witmeyer	6–4, 3–6, 7–5
1994–2013	not held		
2014	(Germany) Sabine Lisicki	(Czech Republic) Karolína Plíšková	7–5, 6–3
2015	(Serbia) Jelena Janković	(Germany) Angelique Kerber	3–6, 7–6^{(7–4)}, 6–1
2016	(Denmark) Caroline Wozniacki	(France) Kristina Mladenovic	6–1, 6–7^{(4–7)}, 6–2
2017	(Russia) Anastasia Pavlyuchenkova	(Australia) Daria Gavrilova	5–7, 6–3, 7–6^{(7–3)}
2018	(Ukraine) Dayana Yastremska	(China) Wang Qiang	6–2, 6–1
2019–22	Not held		
2023	(Canada) Leylah Fernandez	(Czech Republic) Kateřina Siniaková	3–6, 6–4, 6–4
2024	Diana Shnaider	(United Kingdom) Katie Boulter	6–1, 6–2
2025	(Canada) Victoria Mboko	(Spain) Cristina Bucșa	7–5, 6–7^{(9–11)}, 6–2
2026	(United States) Claire Liu	(Philippines) Alexandra Eala	6–3, 6–0

=== Men's doubles ===
Year	Champions	Runners-up	Score
1973	(Australia) Colin Dibley (Australia) Rod Laver	(United States) Paul Gerken (United States) Brian Gottfried	6–3, 5–7, 17–15
1974	Not completed due to rain		
1975	(Netherlands) Tom Okker (Australia) Ken Rosewall	(Australia) Bob Carmichael (United States) Sandy Mayer	6–3, 6–4
1976	(United States) Hank Pfister (United States) Butch Walts	(India) Anand Amritraj (Romania) Ilie Năstase	6–4, 6–2
1977	(Australia) Syd Ball (Australia) Kim Warwick	(United States) Marty Riessen (United States) Roscoe Tanner	7–6, 6–3
1978	(Australia) Mark Edmondson (Australia) John Marks	(United States) Hank Pfister (United States) Brad Rowe	5–7, 7–6, 6–1
1979	(United States) Pat DuPré (United States) Robert Lutz	(United States) Steve Denton (United States) Mark Turpin	6–3, 6–4
1980	(United States) Peter Fleming (United States) Ferdi Taygan	(United States) Bruce Manson (United States) Brian Teacher	7–5, 6–2
1981	(United States) Chris Dunk (United States) Chris Mayotte	(United States) Marty Davis (Australia) Brad Drewett	6–4, 7–6
1982	(United States) Charles Buzz Strode (United States) Morris Skip Strode	(Australia) Kim Warwick (United States) Van Winitsky	6–4, 3–6, 6–2
1983	(United States) Drew Gitlin (Australia) Craig Miller	(United States) Sammy Giammalva Jr. (United States) Steve Meister	6–2, 6–2
1984	(United States) Ken Flach (United States) Robert Seguso	(Australia) Mark Edmondson (Australia) Paul McNamee	6–7, 6–3, 7–5
1985	(Australia) Brad Drewett (Australia) Kim Warwick	(Switzerland) Jakob Hlasek (Czech Republic) Tomáš Šmíd	3–6, 6–4, 6–2
1986	(United States) Mike De Palmer (United States) Gary Donnelly	(Australia) Pat Cash (Australia) Mark Kratzmann	7–6, 6–7, 7–5
1987	(Australia) Mark Kratzmann (United States) Jim Pugh	(United States) Marty Davis (Australia) Brad Drewett	6–7, 6–4, 6–2
1988–89	Not held		
1990	(Australia) Pat Cash (Australia) Wally Masur	(United States) Kevin Curren (United States) Joey Rive	6–3, 6–3
1991	(United States) Patrick Galbraith (United States) Todd Witsken	(Canada) Glenn Michibata (United States) Robert Van't Hof	6–2, 6–4
1992	(United States) Brad Gilbert (United States) Jim Grabb	(Zimbabwe) Byron Black (South Africa) Byron Talbot	6–2, 6–1
1993	(United States) David Wheaton (Australia) Todd Woodbridge	(Australia) Sandon Stolle (Australia) Jason Stoltenberg	6–1, 6–3
1994	(United States) Jim Grabb (New Zealand) Brett Steven	(Sweden) Jonas Björkman (Australia) Pat Rafter	W/O
1995	(United States) Tommy Ho (Australia) Mark Philippoussis	(Australia) John Fitzgerald (Sweden) Anders Järryd	6–1, 6–7, 7–6
1996	(United States) Patrick Galbraith (Russia) Andrei Olhovskiy	(United States) Kent Kinnear (United States) Dave Randall	6–3, 6–7, 7–6
1997	(Czech Republic) Martin Damm (Czech Republic) Daniel Vacek	(Germany) Karsten Braasch (United States) Jeff Tarango	6–3, 6–4
1998	(Zimbabwe) Byron Black (United States) Alex O'Brien	(South Africa) Neville Godwin (Finland) Tuomas Ketola	7–5, 6–1
1999	(New Zealand) James Greenhalgh (Australia) Grant Silcock	(United States) Andre Agassi (United States) David Wheaton	W/O
2000	(Zimbabwe) Wayne Black (Zimbabwe) Kevin Ullyett	(Slovakia) Dominik Hrbatý (Germany) David Prinosil	6–1, 6–2
2001	(Germany) Karsten Braasch (Brazil) André Sá	(Czech Republic) Petr Luxa (Czech Republic) Radek Štěpánek	6–0, 7–5
2002	(United States) Jan-Michael Gambill (United States) Graydon Oliver	(Australia) Wayne Arthurs (Australia) Andrew Kratzmann	6–7, 6–4, 7–6
2003–23	Not held		
2024	(El Salvador) Marcelo Arévalo (Croatia) Mate Pavić	(Belgium) Sander Gillé (Belgium) Joran Vliegen	7–6^{(7–3)}, 6–4
2025	(Netherlands) Sander Arends (United Kingdom) Luke Johnson	Karen Khachanov; Andrey Rublev	7–5, 4–6, [10–7]
2026	(Italy) Lorenzo Musetti (Italy) Lorenzo Sonego	Karen Khachanov; Andrey Rublev	6–4, 2–6, [10–1]

=== Women's doubles ===
Year	Champions	Runners-up	Score
1980	(Australia) Wendy Turnbull (United States) Sharon Walsh	(Chile) Silvana Urroz (United States) Penny Johnson	6–1, 6–2
1981	(United States) Ann Kiyomura (United States) Sharon Walsh (2)	(United Kingdom) Anne Hobbs (Australia) Susan Leo	6–3, 6–4
1982	(United States) Alycia Moulton (United States) Laura duPont	(South Africa) Yvonne Vermaak (South Africa) Jennifer Mundel-Reinbold	6–2, 4–6, 7–5
1983–1992	Not held		
1993	(Germany) Karin Kschwendt (Australia) Rachel McQuillan	(United States) Debbie Graham (United States) Marianne Witmeyer	1–6, 7–6^{(7–4)}, 6–2
1994–2013	Not held		
2014	(Czech Republic) Karolína Plíšková (Czech Republic) Kristýna Plíšková	(Austria) Patricia Mayr-Achleitner (Australia) Arina Rodionova	6–2, 2–6, [12–10]
2015	(France) Alizé Cornet (Kazakhstan) Yaroslava Shvedova	(Spain) Lara Arruabarrena (Slovenia) Andreja Klepač	7–5, 6–4
2016	(Chinese Taipei) Chan Hao-ching (Chinese Taipei) Chan Yung-jan	(United Kingdom) Naomi Broady (United Kingdom) Heather Watson	6–3, 6–1
2017	(Chinese Taipei) Chan Hao-ching (2) (Chinese Taipei) Chan Yung-jan (2)	(China) Lu Jiajing (China) Wang Qiang	6–1, 6–1
2018	(Australia) Samantha Stosur (China) Zhang Shuai	(Japan) Shuko Aoyama (Belarus) Lidziya Marozava	6–4, 6–4
2019–22	Not held		
2023	(China) Tang Qianhui (Chinese Taipei) Tsao Chia-yi	(Georgia (country)) Oksana Kalashnikova; Aliaksandra Sasnovich	7–5, 1–6, [11–9]
2024	(Norway) Ulrikke Eikeri (Japan) Makoto Ninomiya	(Japan) Shuko Aoyama (Japan) Eri Hozumi	6–4, 4–6, [11–9]
2025	(China) Jiang Xinyu (China) Wang Yafan	(Japan) Momoko Kobori (Thailand) Peangtarn Plipuech	6–4, 6–2
2026	(Chinese Taipei) Chan Hao-ching (3) (Japan) Miyu Kato	(Australia) Talia Gibson (Australia) Maddison Inglis	6–4, 6–4

== See also ==
- Hong Kong National Grass Court Championships
- Hong Kong National Hardcourt Championships
- Hong Kong National Tennis Championships
