= Lorenzo Musetti =

Italian tennis player (born 2002)

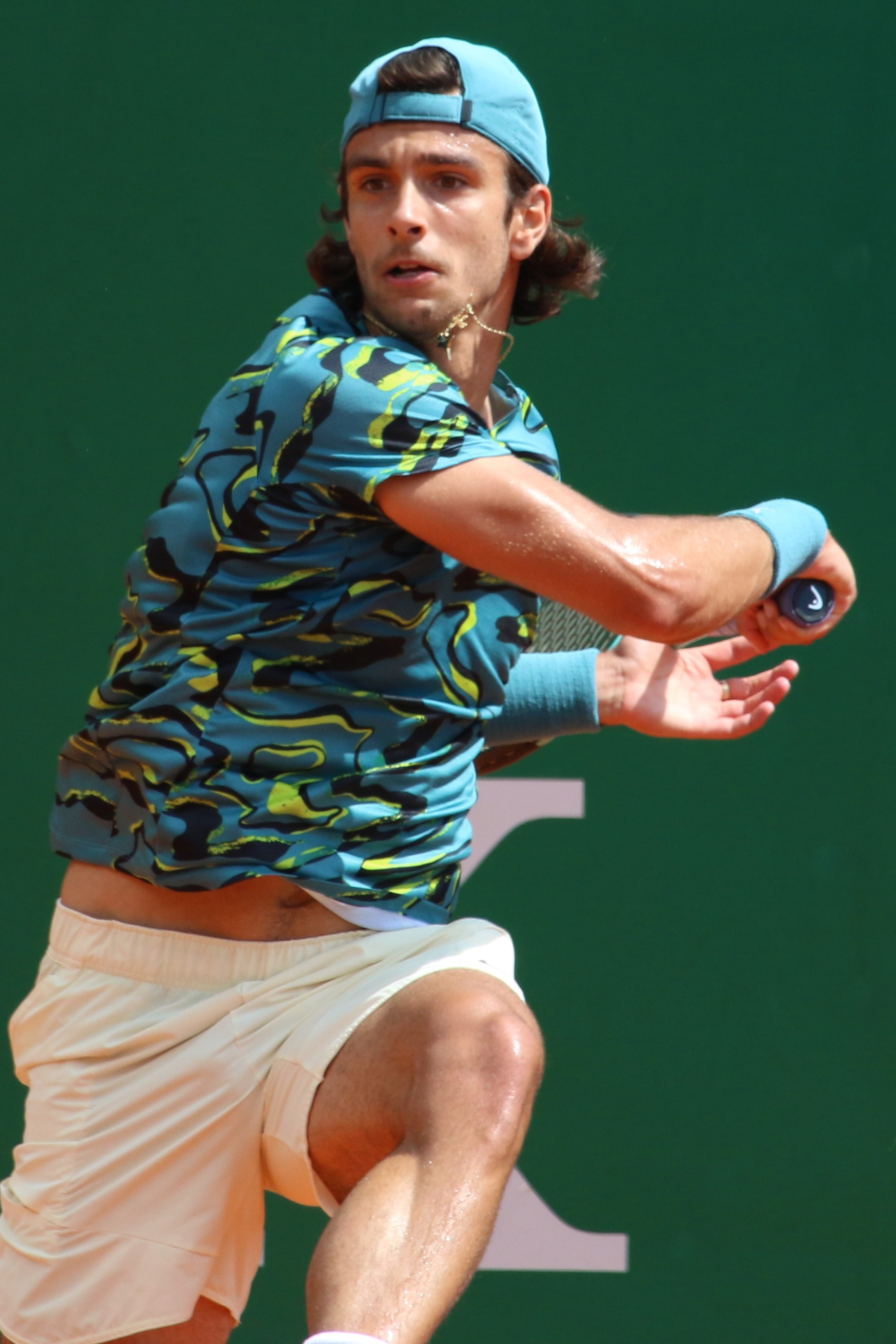
- Musetti at the 2023 Monte-Carlo Masters
- Full name: Lorenzo Musetti
- Country (sports): Italy
- Residence: Monte Carlo, Monaco
- Born: 3 March 2002 (age 24) Carrara, Italy
- Height: 1.85 m (6 ft 1 in)
- Turned pro: 2019
- Plays: Right-handed (one-handed backhand)
- Coach: Simone Tartarini, Jose Perlas (2025–2026)
- Prize money: US $17,083,556

Singles
- Career record: 202–145
- Career titles: 3
- Highest ranking: No. 5 (12 January 2026)
- Current ranking: No. 25 (9 November 2026)

Grand Slam singles results
- Australian Open: QF (2026)
- French Open: SF (2025)
- Wimbledon: SF (2024)
- US Open: QF (2025)

Other tournaments
- Tour Finals: RR (2025)
- Olympic Games: Bronze (2024)

Doubles
- Career record: 25–32
- Career titles: 1
- Highest ranking: No. 83 (13 April 2026)
- Current ranking: No. 209(19 October 2026)

Grand Slam doubles results
- Australian Open: 1R (2022)
- French Open: 1R (2021)
- Wimbledon: 1R (2022)
- US Open: 1R (2022)

Other doubles tournaments
- Olympic Games: 2R (2021)

Grand Slam mixed doubles results
- US Open: QF (2025)

Team competitions
- Davis Cup: W (2023, 2024); Record: 3–6
Medal record
Representing Italy
Olympic Games
Bronze medal – third place	2024 Paris	Men's Singles
- Last updated on: 26 October 2026.

Lorenzo Musetti (Italian pronunciation: [loˈrɛntso muˈzetti]; born 3 March 2002) is an Italian professional tennis player. He has been ranked by the Association of Tennis Professionals (ATP) as high as world No. 5 in singles, achieved in January 2026, and No. 83 in doubles, achieved in April 2026. Musetti has won three ATP Tour titles in singles and one in doubles. He has reached the quarterfinals at all four majors, and made two semifinal appearances at the 2024 Wimbledon Championships and 2025 French Open.

Representing his country, Musetti won the bronze medal in men's singles at the 2024 Olympic Games. He was part of the Italian team that won the Davis Cup in 2023 and in 2024.

== Early life ==
Musetti was born on 3 March 2002 in Carrara, Tuscany, Italy. His father, Francesco Musetti, is a marble producer, and his mother, Sabrina Ratti, is a secretary.

He began playing tennis at the age of four, and has been coached by Simone Tartarini since childhood; Musetti has said he doesn't think he will ever change coaches. His tennis idol growing up was Roger Federer, which contributed to his usage of the one-handed backhand.

== Junior career ==
Musetti had notable results on the ITF junior circuit. He was a runner-up of the boys' singles category at the 2018 US Open. In January 2019, the young Italian won the major jr. singles title at the 2019 Australian Open, defeating Emilio Nava in a final set tiebreak.

Musetti had an ITF junior combined ranking of world No. 1 on 10 June 2019.

== Professional career ==
=== 2020: ATP debut, first ATP semifinal ===
After receiving a wildcard and passing the qualifying, he made his ATP Tour main draw debut in February 2020 at the Dubai Tennis Championships, at the age of 17, where he lost in the first round against Andrey Rublev.

His second main draw tour-level match and first on a Masters 1000 level in his career came after qualifying at the Italian Open, where he defeated three-time Grand Slam champion Stan Wawrinka in straight sets in the first round, becoming the first player born in 2002 to win an ATP match, and former world No. 4 Kei Nishikori in the second round. In October he received a wildcard for the Forte Village Sardegna Open, where he reached his first ATP semifinal, retiring due to an injury against eventual champion Laslo Đere after trailing 1–4 in the third set.

=== 2021: Youngest Top 100, more ATP semifinals ===
Musetti was the youngest player to break into the top 100 for the first time in his career by reaching the semifinals of the ATP Tour 500 Mexican Open tournament in March after going through qualifying. There he had his first top 10 win against world No. 9 Diego Schwartzman in three sets. He also beat Frances Tiafoe and 5th-seed Grigor Dimitrov to break into the top 100 and reach his second ATP semifinal, and first at a 500 level, where he was defeated in straight sets by Stefanos Tsitsipas. The 19-year-old was the third-youngest semifinalist in the tournament's history. Only Xavier Malisse (1998) and Rafael Nadal (2005) reached the final four in Acapulco at a younger age.

Musetti reached his third ATP semifinal at the Lyon Open in May, where he was again defeated by Tsitsipas.

He capped off the clay season by reaching the fourth round at the French Open, on his Grand Slam championship debut (only the sixth player since 2000 to do so), beating 13th seed David Goffin, Yoshihito Nishioka and Marco Cecchinato in his first five-set match. He had a 2–0 lead in sets against top seed Novak Djokovic in the fourth round, but retired in the 5th set trailing 0–4. As a result of this successful run, he climbed to his best ranking of world No. 57 on 13 September 2021.

At the end of the season, he took part in the Next Generation ATP Finals, where he was eliminated in the round robin stage as third of his group, having lost to Sebastián Báez and finalist Sebastian Korda, and won to Hugo Gaston.

=== 2022: Two ATP titles, Top 25 ===
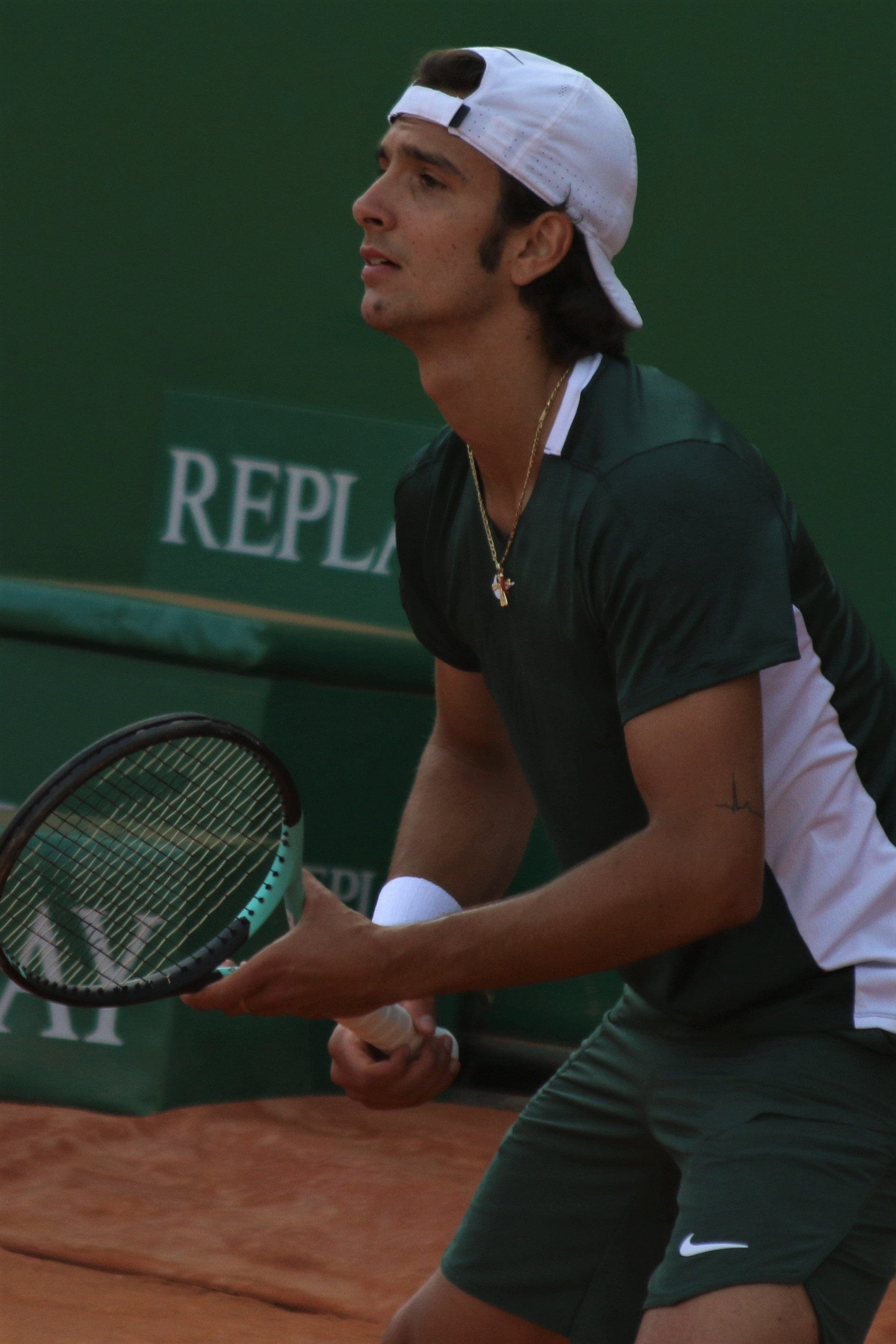
Musetti at the 2022 Monte-Carlo Masters

At the beginning of the season, Musetti reached the quarterfinals at the ATP 500 Rotterdam Open, losing to Jiří Lehečka after having defeated No. 11 Hubert Hurkacz in the second round. In Monte Carlo, he recorded the second top 10 win of his career by defeating world number 9 Félix Auger-Aliassime in the second round.

After reaching his fourth career tour-level semifinal at the 2022 Hamburg European Open with a win over Alejandro Davidovich Fokina, he made his top 50 debut in the rankings. He defeated Francisco Cerúndolo in the semifinals to reach the first ATP final of his career. He triumphed over world No. 6 and top seed Carlos Alcaraz in the final, winning his first ATP title and first ATP 500 tournament. As a result, he climbed up the rankings to world No. 31 on 25 July 2022. Following the title, Musetti made his top 30 debut at world No. 30 on 1 August, after winning his opening round at the Croatia Open.

At the US Open, where Musetti was seeded for the first time at a grand slam, he reached the third round, his deepest run in a grand slam since the 2021 French Open. In the first round, he defeated former world number 7 David Goffin in a five set match, decided by a fifth-set tiebreak. He then defeated Gijs Brouwer, but lost to Ilya Ivashka in four sets.

In the fall, Musetti reached his fifth and sixth ATP semifinals at the consecutive Sofia Open and Firenze Open tournaments, where he was defeated in both cases by eventual champions Marc-Andrea Huesler and Félix Auger-Aliassime. He then won his second career title at the Tennis Napoli Cup over fellow countryman Matteo Berrettini, without dropping a set. Following the title, he reached a career-high ranking of No. 23 on 24 October 2022.

At the 2022 Paris Masters, Musetti reached the quarterfinals of a Masters 1000 for the first time in his career. He defeated former world No. 3 Marin Čilić, Nikoloz Basilashvili, and world No. 4 Casper Ruud for his biggest and first top-5 win, but lost to Novak Djokovic. Musetti's final ATP tournament of the year was the Next Generation ATP Finals, where he was eliminated in the round-robin stage after beating Tseng Chun-hsin, but losing to Dominic Stricker and Jack Draper.

=== 2023: Davis Cup champion, No. 1 victory ===
At the United Cup, Musetti helped Italy reach the final after going 4–1 in his singles matches; he retired after the first set in his match against Frances Tiafoe due to a shoulder injury. After this, he reached the top 20 at world No. 19 on 9 January 2023. Musetti was upset in the first round of the Australian Open by Lloyd Harris in five sets, however, he jumped one spot to a career-high of No. 18 in the rankings following the tournament.

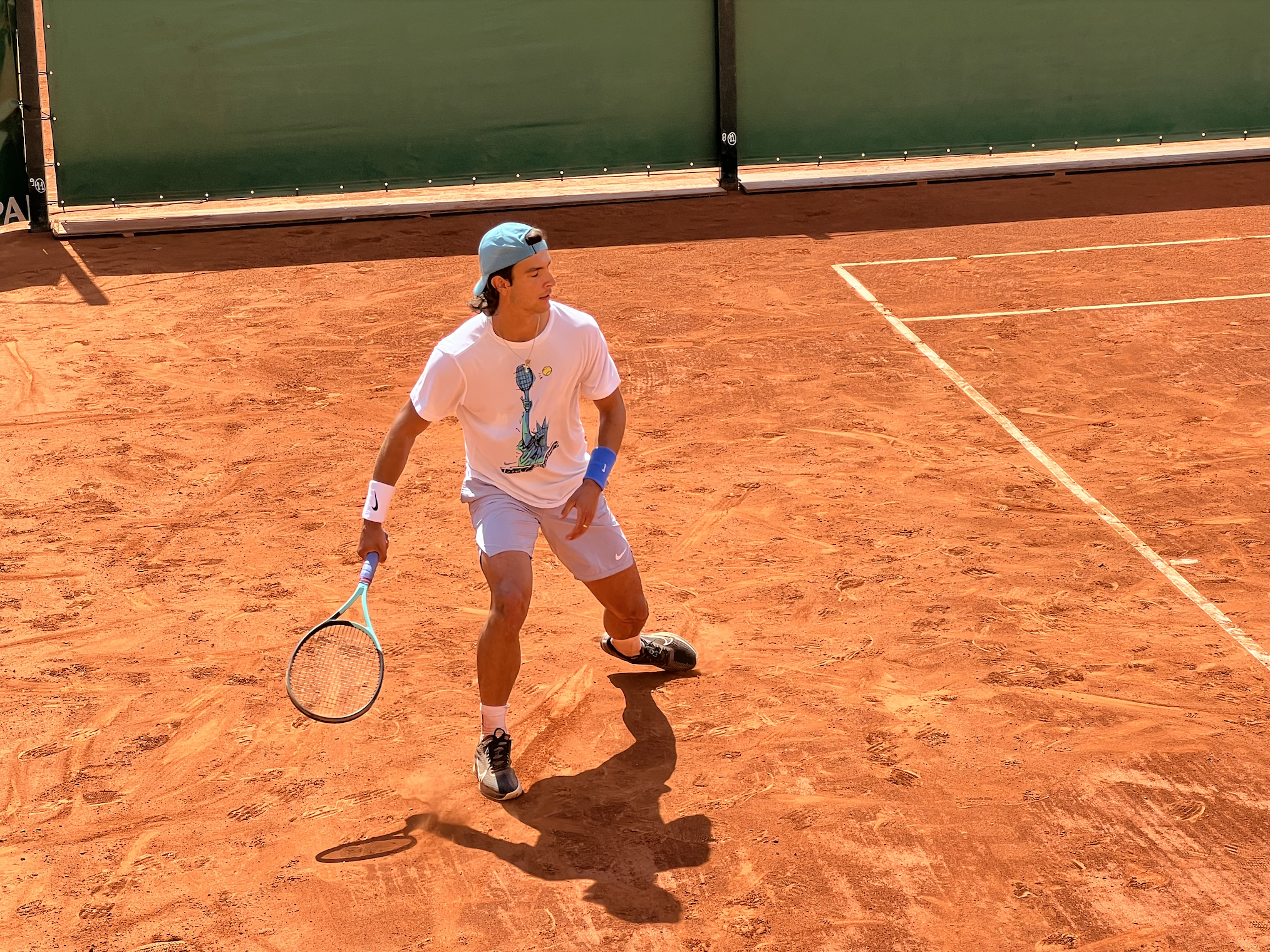
Musetti practicing in Monte-Carlo in 2023.

From the beginning of the Golden Swing in Buenos Aires, to the Grand Prix Hassan II in Marrakesh, Musetti was in poor form, going 2–6 in his singles matches.

At the 2023 Monte-Carlo Masters he defeated Miomir Kecmanović, compatriot Luca Nardi by a double bagel in just 50 minutes, and world No. 1 and top seed Novak Djokovic to reach his second Masters quarterfinal. He then lost to compatriot Jannik Sinner in straight sets. At the French Open, Musetti played strongly, defeating Mikael Ymer, Alexander Shevchenko, and Cameron Norrie all in straight sets, but lost to world No. 1 Carlos Alcaraz in the round of 16.

Prior to Wimbledon, Musetti made two grass court quarterfinals at Stuttgart and Queen's Club; he lost to Frances Tiafoe and Holger Rune respectively. As a result, he reached the top 15 on 26 June 2023. At the 2023 Wimbledon Championships Musetti reached the third round, his furthest run at Wimbledon yet, defeating both Juan Pablo Varillas and Jaume Munar in straight sets. He was eventually eliminated by Hubert Hurkacz.

He lost in the first round at the US Open to qualifier and Major debutant Titouan Droguet. He then lost at the second round of Shanghai, having received a bye for the first, to qualifier and Masters debutant Hsu Yu-hsiou. He also recorded two consecutive first round losses to Grigor Dimitrov at the European indoors tournaments, the 2023 Erste Bank Open and the 2023 Rolex Paris Masters and left the top 25 in the rankings.

Musetti partook in the 2023 Davis Cup, where Italy would be the champions for the first time since 1976. He played two singles matches throughout the tournament, including in the semifinal against Serbia, losing both. He played two doubles matches, both partnering with Simone Bolelli, where he would win one in the round robin stage of the Finals against Chile in September.

He did not participate in the 2023 Next Generation ATP Finals despite qualifying for a third year in a row.

=== 2024: Wimbledon semifinal, Olympic bronze ===
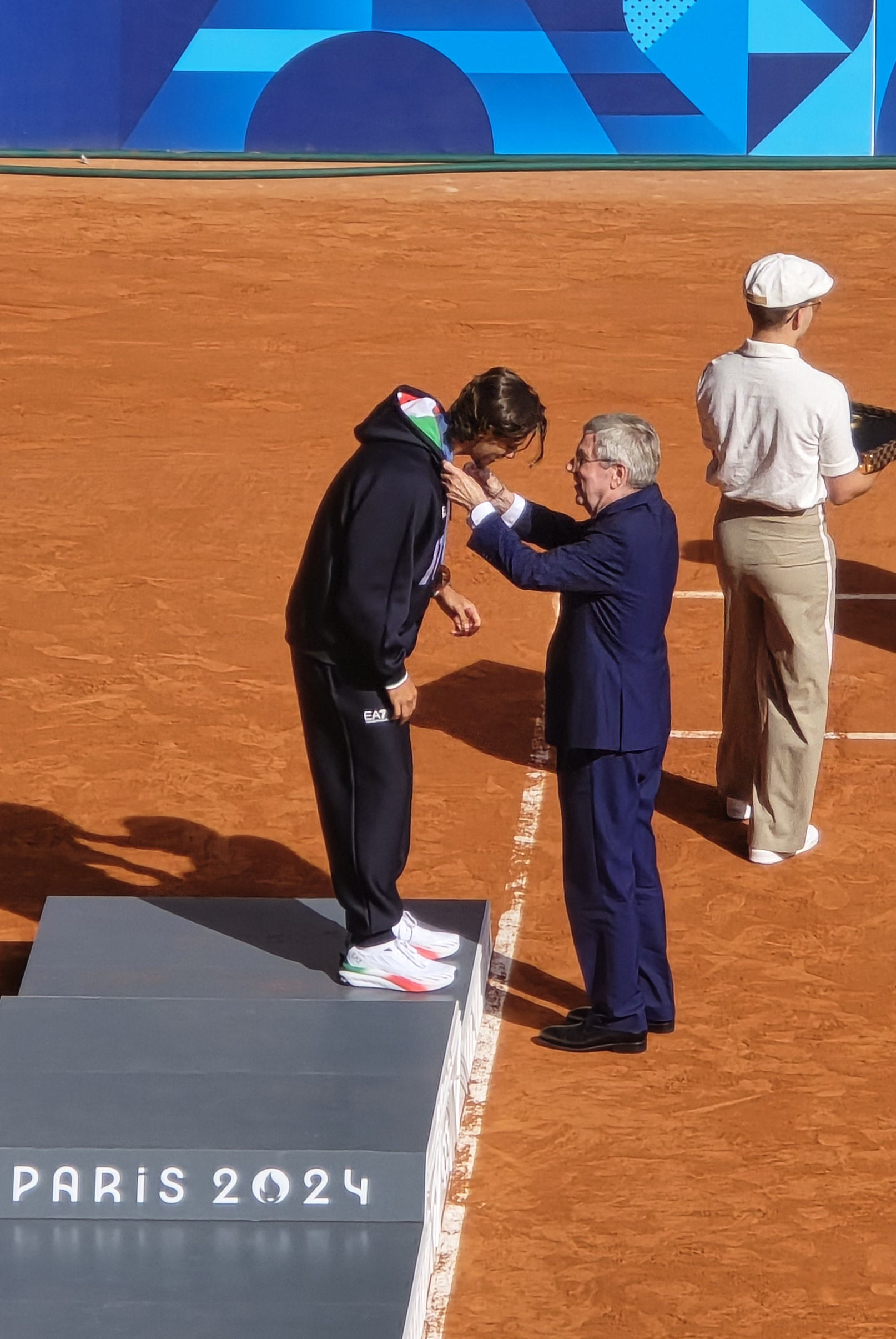
Musetti receiving his bronze medal in the men's singles event at the 2024 Summer Olympics

At the 2024 Australian Open he recorded his first win at this Major defeating Benjamin Bonzi. In Miami he reached the fourth round defeating 16th seed Ben Shelton before losing to top seed and Indian Wells champion Carlos Alcaraz.

At the 2024 Monte-Carlo Masters he defeated 13th seed Taylor Fritz recording his 100th career win.

He defeated again Taylor Fritz in the quarterfinals of the 2024 Wimbledon Championships to reach his first ever Major semifinal. He lost to No. 2 seed Novak Djokovic.

He reached his fourth ATP final at the 2024 Croatia Open Umag defeating qualifier Marco Trungelliti, Dušan Lajović and Jakub Menšík but lost to Francisco Cerúndolo in three sets.

Musetti became the first Italian tennis player to win an Olympic medal for 100 years when he won bronze at the Paris Olympics defeating Félix Auger-Aliassime in the third place play-off in three sets after losing to top seed Novak Djokovic in the semifinals.

At the Chengdu Open in September, he reached the final but lost out in straight sets to Shang Juncheng.

=== 2025: Top 10 debut, success at majors ===
At the 2025 Australian Open, Musetti reached the third round for the first time, where he lost to Ben Shelton in four sets. The rest of his hard-court season was relatively uneventful, as he failed to progress past the round of 16 in each tournament he played in.

At the Monte-Carlo Masters, Musetti not only defeated Matteo Berrettini who had previously defeated Alexander Zverev, but also defeated the defending champion Stefanos Tsitsipas in the quarter-finals, and Alex de Minaur in the semi-finals. In the final he lost to Carlos Alcaraz in three sets. As a result he reached world No. 11 in the rankings on 14 April 2025.

At the next Masters 1000, the 2025 Mutua Madrid Open, Musetti reached back-to-back quarterfinals with another win over Alex de Minaur, and sealed his top 10 debut. He became the sixth Italian player since 1973 to crack the Top 10. He made the final four after defeating lucky loser Gabriel Diallo and moved to a new career-high ranking of world No. 9 in the singles rankings on 5 May 2025. At the Italian Open as the eighth seed, Musetti beat Daniil Medvedev and defending champion Alexander Zverev to reach the semifinal, losing to eventual champion Alcaraz in straight sets. This meant that he was the only player to reach the semifinals or further of all three clay Masters 1000 events of 2025. As a result he reached a new career-high ranking of world No. 8 on 19 May 2025.

Next at Roland-Garros, he defeated Holger Rune and Frances Tiafoe on his way to his first semi-final in Paris. He then lost to Alcaraz once again, despite winning the opening set 6–4 and taking the second to a tiebreak. He retired at 2–0 down in the fourth set having sustained a leg injury after having been bagelled in the third. After this run he reached yet another new career-high of world No. 6 on 9 June 2025.

Due to the leg injury Musetti picked up against Alcaraz, he did not play a tournament between Roland-Garros and Wimbledon. Entering Wimbledon as the seventh seed, the highest seeding of his career at a major, Musetti lost in the first round to qualifier Nikoloz Basilashvili in four sets. He lost in the first round of Washington to Cameron Norrie, the second round of Toronto to Alex Michelsen, and the first round of Cincinnati to Benjamin Bonzi. He entered the US Open in late August having won just one of his last five matches.

In New York, his favourite city on tour, Musetti rediscovered his form. He only dropped one set as he defeated Giovanni Mpetshi Perricard, David Goffin, Flavio Cobolli and Jaume Munar, to reach his first US Open quarter-final, and only the third quarter-final at a major in his career. He then played fellow Italian and defending champion Jannik Sinner, to whom he lost in straight sets.

At the Chengdu Open as the No. 1 seed, he reached the final but lost to Alejandro Tabilo despite holding two championship points. At the Beijing Open, he reached the quarter-final, where he retired against Learner Tien after feeling left leg discomfort. At the Shanghai Masters, he reached the round of 16, losing to Felix Auger-Aliassime in straight sets. He then lost in the quarter-finals of the Brussels Open to Giovanni Mpetshi Perricard.

Even though he was defeated in the final of the Hellenic Championship by Novak Djokovic, he still qualified for the ATP Finals due to Djokovic's withdrawal.

=== 2026: World No. 5, third singles title, first doubles title, injuries ===
Musetti at the 2026 Cincinnati Open

Musetti began his season at the Hong Kong Open by beating Tomás Martín Etcheverry and home favorite Coleman Wong. By beating Andrey Rublev in the semifinals, Musetti officially entered the Top 5 in the ATP rankings at world No. 5, becoming the third Italian in the history of the PIF ATP Rankings to be ranked inside the Top 5, following Adriano Panatta and Jannik Sinner. He lost to Alexander Bublik in the final in straight sets.

Musetti, however, teamed up with Lorenzo Sonego and won the doubles title at the same tournament, beating the pair of Karen Khachanov and Rublev. It was his first title in doubles.

Musetti advanced to the quarterfinals of the 2026 Australian Open with a notable win over Taylor Fritz in straight sets and completing a set of quarterfinals reached at all four majors, but was forced to retire due to injury while leading Novak Djokovic two sets to love. He then also withdrew from the Golden clay swing and Acapulco.

After experiencing disappointing exits at Indian Wells and in Monte-Carlo, Musetti reached the quarterfinals in Barcelona, before losing to eventual champion Arthur Fils.

Following a loss to Casper Ruud in the fourth round of the Italian Open, Musetti then announced he would be withdrawing from the French Open due to a rectus femoris injury. He later withdrew from Wimbledon because of the same injury.As a result of his absence from the tour, he dropped out of top 25 in the ATP rankings.

At the Lyon Open, he defeated compatriot Matteo Arnaldi, local wildcard Moïse Kouamé, Luca Van Assche in his 200th ATP Tour level win to reach the semifinals, where he saved four match-points to beat compatriot Flavio Cobolli and reach his first ATP Tour final after his comeback from injury.

== Personal life ==
On 15 March 2024, Musetti announced that he and his partner Veronica Confalonieri had welcomed a son, whom they named Ludovico. Their second son, Leandro, was born on 29 November 2025.

Musetti has revealed that the birth of his first child changed his mentality around tennis and inspired him to play better and train harder. He also credits reaching the semifinals of Wimbledon and a bronze medal at the Summer Olympics in Paris (both in 2024) to the same inspiration.

Musetti has lived with a group of five friends since the age of 8; he calls them his first fans after his family. Musetti trains at Circolo Tennis Spezia and in Tirrenia. He is also a longtime fan of Juventus FC.

== Playing style ==
Musetti is an all-court player who primarily plays a counter-punching game from the baseline. He is known for his one-handed backhand, widely regarded as one of the best on tour. He is capable of hitting winners from difficult positions, such as deep beyond the baseline or outside the doubles alley.

Musetti is also noted for the variety in his game, including his use of the defensive backhand slice, drop shots, and serve and volley tactics. He is able to adapt his playing style from surface to surface, as evidenced by his comparable success on hard, grass, and clay courts. In recent years, Musetti has worked on developing his forehand as an aggressive weapon to complement his defensive shot-making.

Musetti has been praised for his excellent backhand and his ability to hit winners with both forehand and backhand. He has said that he only ever used the one-hander and that it 'just felt right' for him when he started playing at age four. He has said that his favourite surface is clay and that the forehand is his favourite shot.

== Career statistics ==
=== Grand Slam tournament performance timeline ===
Key
W	F	SF	QF	#R	RR	Q#	DNQ	A	NH

(W) winner; (F) finalist; (SF) semifinalist; (QF) quarterfinalist; (#R) rounds 4, 3, 2, 1; (RR) round-robin stage; (Q#) qualification round; (DNQ) did not qualify; (A) absent; (NH) not held; (SR) strike rate (events won / competed); (W–L) win–loss record.
To avoid confusion and double counting, these charts are updated at the conclusion of a tournament or when the player's participation has ended.

Current through the 2026 US Open.

Tournament	2019	2020	2021	2022	2023	2024	2025	2026	SR	W–L	Win %
Grand Slam tournaments
Australian Open	A	Q3	Q1	1R	1R	2R	3R	QF	0 / 5	7–5	58%
French Open	A	A	4R	1R	4R	3R	SF	A	0 / 5	13–5	72%
Wimbledon	A	NH	1R	1R	3R	SF	1R	A	0 / 5	7–5	58%
US Open	A	A	2R	3R	1R	3R	QF	2R	0 / 5	9–5	64%
Win–loss	0–0	0–0	4–3	2–4	5–4	10–4	11–4	4–1	0 / 20	36–20	64%

=== ATP 1000 tournaments ===
==== Singles: 1 (runner-up) ====
Result	Year	Tournament	Surface	Opponent	Score
Loss	2025	Monte-Carlo Masters	Clay	(Spain) Carlos Alcaraz	6–3, 1–6, 0–6

==== Doubles: 1 (runner-up) ====
Result	Year	Tournament	Surface	Partner	Opponents	Score
Loss	2025	Cincinnati Open	Hard	(Italy) Lorenzo Sonego	(Croatia) Nikola Mektić (United States) Rajeev Ram	6–4, 3–6, [5–10]

=== Summer Olympics ===
==== Singles: 1 (bronze medal) ====
Result	Year	Tournament	Surface	Opponent	Score
Bronze	2024	Paris Olympics, France	Clay	(Canada) Félix Auger-Aliassime	6–4, 1–6, 6–3

=== Awards and honours ===
Musetti has received the following awards and honours:

==== Media awards ====
- Gazzetta dello Sport Italian Sportsman of the Year – 2025

==== Orders ====
- CONI Golden Collar of Sports Merit (Collare d'Oro al Merito Sportivo) (2) – 2023, 2024

Awards
Preceded by Jannik Sinner	Gazzetta dello Sport; Italian Sportsman of the Year; 2025	Succeeded by Incumbent
