= 2020 Thailand Open (tennis) =

Women's Tennis Association tournament in Hua Hin, Thailand

- Date: 10 – 16 February 2020
- Edition: 2nd
- Category: WTA International
- Draw: 32S / 16D
- Prize money: $275,000
- Surface: Hard, outdoor
- Location: Hua Hin, Prachuap Khiri Khan, Thailand
- Venue: True Arena Hua Hin

Champions

Singles
- (Poland) Magda Linette

Doubles
- (Australia) Arina Rodionova / (Australia) Storm Sanders
← 2019 ·	Hua Hin Championships	· 2023 →

The 2020 Thailand Open (also known as the GSB Thailand Open presented by E@ for sponsorship reasons) was a Women's Tennis Association (WTA) tournament played on outdoor hard courts. It was the 2nd edition of the Hua Hin Championships as part of the WTA International tournaments of the 2020 WTA Tour. It took place at the True Arena Hua Hin in Hua Hin, Thailand, from 10 February to 16 February 2020.

== Points and prize money ==
=== Point distribution ===
Event	W	F	SF	QF	Round of 16	Round of 32	Q	Q2	Q1
Singles	280	180	110	60	30	1	18	12	1
Doubles	280	180	110	60	1	—	—	—	—

=== Prize money ===
Event	W	F	SF	QF	Round of 16	Round of 32	Q2	Q1
Women's singles	$43,000	$21,400	$11,600	$6,275	$3,600	$2,300	$1,685	$1,100
Women's doubles	$12,300	$6,400	$3,435	$1,820	$960	—	—	—

== Singles main draw entrants ==
=== Seeds ===
Country	Player	Rank^{1}	Seed
UKR	Elina Svitolina	4	1
CRO	Petra Martić	15	2
CHN	Wang Qiang	27	3
CHN	Zheng Saisai	36	4
POL	Magda Linette	42	5
CHN	Wang Yafan	56	6
CHN	Zhu Lin	70	7
JPN	Nao Hibino	84	8

- ^{1} Rankings as of February 3, 2020.

=== Other entrants ===
The following players received wildcards into the singles main draw:

- (Canada) ~~Eugenie Bouchard~~
- (Thailand) Patcharin Cheapchandej
- (Croatia) Petra Martić
- (China) Wang Qiang

The following player received protected rankings into the singles main draw:

- (Ukraine) Kateryna Bondarenko

The following players received entry from the qualifying draw:

- (Norway) Ulrikke Eikeri
- (Switzerland) Leonie Küng
- (Chinese Taipei) Liang En-shuo
- (Japan) Chihiro Muramatsu
- (Australia) Ellen Perez
- (Australia) Storm Sanders

The following player received entry as a lucky loser:

- (Thailand) Peangtarn Plipuech

=== Withdrawals ===
Before the tournament

- (Spain) Paula Badosa → replaced by (China) Yuan Yue
- (Canada) Eugenie Bouchard → replaced by (Thailand) Peangtarn Plipuech
- (Australia) Priscilla Hon → replaced by (Netherlands) Bibiane Schoofs
- (Chinese Taipei) Hsieh Su-wei → replaced by (Serbia) Natalija Kostić
- (Australia) Maddison Inglis → replaced by (Australia) Arina Rodionova
- (Montenegro) Danka Kovinić → replaced by (India) Ankita Raina
- (Czech Republic) Barbora Krejčiková → replaced by (France) Chloé Paquet
- (Germany) Tatjana Maria → replaced by (China) You Xiaodi
- (Australia) Samantha Stosur → replaced by (China) Han Xinyun
- (Ukraine) Dayana Yastremska → replaced by (China) Wang Xinyu

== Doubles main draw entrants ==
=== Seeds ===
Country	Player	Country	Player	Rank^{1}	Seed
JPN	Nao Hibino	JPN	Miyu Kato	146	1
CHN	Peng Shuai	CHN	Wang Yafan	149	3
JPN	Eri Hozumi	JPN	Makoto Ninomiya	170	4
AUS	Arina Rodionova	AUS	Storm Sanders	183	4

- ^{1} Rankings as of February 3, 2020

=== Other entrants ===
The following pairs received wildcards into the doubles main draw:

- (Ukraine) Kateryna Bondarenko / (Thailand) Tamarine Tanasugarn
- (Hong Kong) Ng Kwan-yau / (Ukraine) Elina Svitolina

== Champions ==
=== Singles ===
- (Poland) Magda Linette def. (Switzerland) Leonie Küng 6–3, 6–2

=== Doubles ===
- (Australia) Arina Rodionova / (Australia) Storm Sanders def. (Austria) Barbara Haas / (Australia) Ellen Perez 6–3, 6–3
