= 2024 Thailand Open – Doubles =

Doubles
- 2024 Thailand Open

Final
- Champions: (Japan) Miyu Kato (Indonesia) Aldila Sutjiadi
- Runners-up: (China) Guo Hanyu (China) Jiang Xinyu
- Score: 6–4, 1–6, [10–7]

Events
Singles	Doubles
- Hua Hin Championships

Miyu Kato and Aldila Sutjiadi defeated Guo Hanyu and Jiang Xinyu in the final, 6–4, 1–6, [10–7] to win the doubles tennis title at the 2024 Thailand Open.

Chan Hao-ching and Wu Fang-hsien were the reigning champions, but Chan chose not to participate this year. Wu partnered Tamara Zidanšek, but lost in the quarterfinals to Guo and Jiang.

== Seeds ==
1. (Japan) Miyu Kato / (Indonesia) Aldila Sutjiadi (champions)
2. (China) Guo Hanyu / (China) Jiang Xinyu (final)
3. (Italy) Angelica Moratelli / (Italy) Camilla Rosatello (first round)
4. (Netherlands) Bibiane Schoofs / (Czech Republic) Anna Sisková (quarterfinals)

== Draw ==
Key

- Q = Qualifier
- WC = Wild card
- LL = Lucky loser
- Alt = Alternate
- ITF = ITF entry
- PR = Protected ranking
- SR = Special ranking
- SE = Special exempt
- JE = Junior exempt
- JR = Junior Accelerator Programme entrant
- CO = College Accelerator Programme entrant
- NG = Next Gen Accelerator Program entrant
- w/o = Walkover
- r = Retired
- d = Defaulted

=== Draw ===
First round
1	(Japan) M Kato (Indonesia) A Sutjiadi	6	7^{7}
(Japan) N Hibino (Brazil) I Martins	1	6^{4}
(Greece) V Grammatikopoulou; A Tikhonova	6	4	[10]
Alt	(Australia) K Birrell (Hungary) D Gálfi	2	6	[5]
4	(Netherlands) B Schoofs (Czech Republic) A Sisková	6	3	[10]
WC	(Chinese Taipei) E-s Liang (Thailand) L Tararudee	2	6	[3]
(Australia) Ar Rodionova (China) Y Yuan	2	6	[10]
(Thailand) L Kumkhum (Thailand) P Plipuech	6	4	[3]
WC	(Thailand) T Naklo (Thailand) S Ounmuang	4	1
K Rakhimova; Y Sizikova	6	6
(Georgia (country)) N Dzalamidze (Poland) K Kawa	7^{9}	6
3	(Italy) A Moratelli (Italy) C Rosatello	6^{7}	4
(Germany) J Lohoff (Switzerland) C Perrin	4	4
(Chinese Taipei) F-h Wu (Slovenia) T Zidanšek	6	6
(Czech Republic) L Fruhvirtová; D Shnaider	7	5	[2]
2	(China) H Guo (China) X Jiang	5	7	[10]

Quarterfinals
1	(Japan) M Kato (Indonesia) A Sutjiadi	7	6
(Greece) V Grammatikopoulou; A Tikhonova	5	1
4	(Netherlands) B Schoofs (Czech Republic) A Sisková	6	2	[8]
(Australia) Ar Rodionova (China) Y Yuan	3	6	[10]
K Rakhimova; Y Sizikova	6	7
(Georgia (country)) N Dzalamidze (Poland) K Kawa	1	5
(Chinese Taipei) F-h Wu (Slovenia) T Zidanšek	6	2	[5]
2	(China) H Guo (China) X Jiang	2	6	[10]

Semifinals
1	(Japan) M Kato (Indonesia) A Sutjiadi	4	6	[10]
(Australia) Ar Rodionova (China) Y Yuan	6	2	[7]
K Rakhimova; Y Sizikova	2	6	[9]
2	(China) H Guo (China) X Jiang	6	4	[11]

Final
1	(Japan) M Kato (Indonesia) A Sutjiadi	6	1	[10]
2	(China) H Guo (China) X Jiang	4	6	[7]
