= 2024 Thailand Open (tennis) =

- Date: 29 January – 4 February 2024
- Edition: 4th
- Category: WTA 250
- Draw: 32S / 16D
- Prize money: $267,082
- Surface: Hard / outdoor
- Location: Hua Hin, Prachuap Khiri Khan, Thailand
- Venue: True Arena Hua Hin

Champions

Singles
- Diana Shnaider

Doubles
- (Japan) Miyu Kato / (Indonesia) Aldila Sutjiadi
| ← 2023 · | Hua Hin Championships | · 2024 → |

The 2024 Thailand Open was a professional WTA tournament played on outdoor hard courts. It was the 4th edition of the Thailand Open as part of the WTA 250 tournaments of the 2024 WTA Tour. It took place at the True Arena Hua Hin in Hua Hin, Thailand, from 29 January to 4 February 2024.

== Champions ==
=== Singles ===
- Diana Shnaider def. (China) Zhu Lin 6–3, 2–6, 6–1

=== Doubles ===
- (Japan) Miyu Kato / (Indonesia) Aldila Sutjiadi def. (China) Guo Hanyu / (China) Jiang Xinyu 6–4, 1–6, [10–7]

== Singles main draw entrants ==
=== Seeds ===
| Country | Player | Rank^{1} | Seed |
|---|---|---|---|
| POL | Magda Linette | 24 | 1 |
| CHN | Zhu Lin | 32 | 2 |
| CHN | Wang Xinyu | 36 | 3 |
| GER | Tatjana Maria | 42 | 4 |
| CHN | Wang Xiyu | 60 | 5 |
| CHN | Yuan Yue | 61 | 6 |
| KAZ | Yulia Putintseva | 64 | 7 |
| SVK | Anna Karolína Schmiedlová | 68 | 8 |

- ^{1} Rankings as of 15 January 2024.

=== Other entrants ===
The following players received wildcards into the singles main draw:

- (Thailand) Thasaporn Naklo
- (Thailand) Lanlana Tararudee
- (Australia) Ajla Tomljanović

The following player received entry into the main draw using a protected ranking:

- (China) Wang Qiang

The following players received entry from the qualifying draw:

- (Hungary) Dalma Gálfi
- (Netherlands) Arianne Hartono
- (Japan) Mai Hontama
- Alina Korneeva
- (France) Chloé Paquet
- (Australia) Taylah Preston

The following player received entry as a lucky loser:

- Anastasia Tikhonova

=== Withdrawals ===
- (United States) Claire Liu → replaced by Anastasia Tikhonova
- (France) Diane Parry → replaced by (China) Wang Yafan
- (Netherlands) Arantxa Rus → replaced by Kamilla Rakhimova
- (Egypt) Mayar Sherif → replaced by (China) Wang Qiang
- (Germany) Laura Siegemund → replaced by (United States) Katie Volynets
- (Bulgaria) Viktoriya Tomova → replaced by Diana Shnaider

== Doubles main draw entrants ==
=== Seeds ===
| Country | Player | Country | Player | Rank^{1} | Seed |
|---|---|---|---|---|---|
| JPN | Miyu Kato | INA | Aldila Sutjiadi | 54 | 1 |
| CHN | Guo Hanyu | CHN | Jiang Xinyu | 132 | 2 |
| ITA | Angelica Moratelli | ITA | Camilla Rosatello | 166 | 3 |
| NED | Bibiane Schoofs | CZE | Anna Sisková | 169 | 4 |

- ^{1} Rankings as of 15 January 2024

=== Other entrants ===
The following pairs received wildcards into the doubles main draw:

- (Chinese Taipei) Liang En-shuo / (Thailand) Lanlana Tararudee
- (Thailand) Thasaporn Naklo / (Thailand) Salakthip Ounmuang

The following pair received entry as alternates:

- (Australia) Kimberly Birrell / (Hungary) Dalma Gálfi

=== Withdrawals ===
- (China) Wang Xinyu / (China) Zheng Saisai → replaced by (Australia) Kimberly Birrell / (Hungary) Dalma Gálfi
