= 2020 Thailand Open – Doubles =

Doubles
- 2020 Thailand Open

Final
- Champions: (Australia) Arina Rodionova (Australia) Storm Sanders
- Runners-up: (Austria) Barbara Haas (Australia) Ellen Perez
- Score: 6–3, 6–3

Events
Singles	Doubles
- Hua Hin Championships

Irina-Camelia Begu and Monica Niculescu were the defending champions, but they chose not to participate this year.

Arina Rodionova and Storm Sanders won the title, defeating Barbara Haas and Ellen Perez in the final, 6–3, 6–3. This was Rodionova's first WTA tour level title.

== Seeds ==
1. (Japan) Nao Hibino / (Japan) Miyu Kato (first round)
2. (China) Peng Shuai / (China) Wang Yafan (semifinals)
3. (Japan) Eri Hozumi / (Japan) Makoto Ninomiya (first round)
4. (Australia) Arina Rodionova / (Australia) Storm Sanders (champions)

== Draw ==
Key

- Q = Qualifier
- WC = Wild card
- LL = Lucky loser
- Alt = Alternate
- ITF = ITF entry
- PR = Protected ranking
- SR = Special ranking
- SE = Special exempt
- JE = Junior exempt
- JR = Junior Accelerator Programme entrant
- CO = College Accelerator Programme entrant
- NG = Next Gen Accelerator Program entrant
- w/o = Walkover
- r = Retired
- d = Defaulted

=== Draw ===
First round
1	(Japan) N Hibino (Japan) M Kato	4	3
(China) F Xun (China) S Zheng	6	6
(India) A Raina (Netherlands) R van der Hoek	6	6
(United States) D Krawczyk (China) X You	4	4
4	(Australia) Ar Rodionova (Australia) S Sanders	6	6
(Uzbekistan) A Amanmuradova (Serbia) N Kostić	3	2
WC	(Hong Kong) K-y Ng (Ukraine) E Svitolina	6^{6}	2
(China) X Han (Netherlands) B Schoofs	7^{8}	6
(Norway) U Eikeri (Chinese Taipei) Y-c Hsieh	2	0
(Austria) B Haas (Australia) E Perez	6	6
WC	(Ukraine) K Bondarenko (Thailand) T Tanasugarn	6	6
3	(Japan) E Hozumi (Japan) M Ninomiya	3	1
(United Kingdom) SB Grey (United Kingdom) E Silva	2	6	[8]
(Japan) J Namigata (Thailand) P Plipuech	6	4	[10]
(China) Xin Wang (China) L Zhu	2	5
2	(China) S Peng (China) Y Wang	6	7

Quarterfinals
(China) F Xun (China) S Zheng	6^{5}	4
(India) A Raina (Netherlands) R van der Hoek	7^{7}	6
4	(Australia) Ar Rodionova (Australia) S Sanders	7^{7}	6
(China) X Han (Netherlands) B Schoofs	6^{3}	1
(Austria) B Haas (Australia) E Perez	6	6
WC	(Ukraine) K Bondarenko (Thailand) T Tanasugarn	3	4
(Japan) J Namigata (Thailand) P Plipuech	4	3
2	(China) S Peng (China) Y Wang	6	6

Semifinals
(India) A Raina (Netherlands) R van der Hoek	1	0^{r}
4	(Australia) Ar Rodionova (Australia) S Sanders	6	3
(Austria) B Haas (Australia) E Perez	6	6
2	(China) S Peng (China) Y Wang	4	2

Final
4	(Australia) Ar Rodionova (Australia) S Sanders	6	6
(Austria) B Haas (Australia) E Perez	3	3
