= 2020 Thailand Open =

2020 Thailand Open can refer to:

- 2020 Thailand Open (tennis), a Women's Tennis Association (WTA) tournament.
- 2020 Yonex Thailand Open, a badminton tournament taking place from 12 to 17 January 2021
- 2020 Toyota Thailand Open, a badminton tournament taking place from 19 to 24 January 2021
