= 2023 Thailand Open =

2023 Thailand Open may refer to:

- 2023 Thailand Open (badminton)
- 2023 Thailand Open (tennis)
