= 2020 Thailand Open – Singles =

Singles
- 2020 Thailand Open

Final
- Champion: (Poland) Magda Linette
- Runner-up: (Switzerland) Leonie Küng
- Score: 6–3, 6–2

Details
- Draw: 32 (6 Q / 4 WC )
- Seeds: 8

Events
Singles	Doubles
- Hua Hin Championships

Dayana Yastremska was the defending champion, but withdrew before the tournament began.

Magda Linette won the title, defeating Leonie Küng in the final, 6–3, 6–2. It was her second WTA Tour title.

== Seeds ==
1. (Ukraine) Elina Svitolina (quarterfinals)
2. (Croatia) Petra Martić (first round)
3. (China) Wang Qiang (quarterfinals)
4. (China) Zheng Saisai (quarterfinals)
5. (Poland) Magda Linette (champion)
6. (China) Wang Yafan (first round)
7. (China) Zhu Lin (second round)
8. (Japan) Nao Hibino (semifinals)

== Draw ==
Key

- Q = Qualifier
- WC = Wild card
- LL = Lucky loser
- Alt = Alternate
- ITF = ITF entry
- PR = Protected ranking
- SR = Special ranking
- SE = Special exempt
- JE = Junior exempt
- JR = Junior Accelerator Programme entrant
- CO = College Accelerator Programme entrant
- NG = Next Gen Accelerator Program entrant
- w/o = Walkover
- r = Retired
- d = Defaulted

=== Finals ===
Semifinals
8	(Japan) Nao Hibino	5	6	3
Q	(Switzerland) Leonie Küng	7	4	6
(Romania) Patricia Maria Țig	5	4
5	(Poland) Magda Linette	7	6

Final
Q	(Switzerland) Leonie Küng	3	2
5	(Poland) Magda Linette	6	6

=== Top half ===
First round
1	(Ukraine) E Svitolina	6	6
(Netherlands) B Schoofs	2	4
Q	(Norway) U Eikeri	3	4
Q	(Australia) S Sanders	6	6
LL	(Thailand) P Plipuech	7^{7}	3	6
(France) C Paquet	6^{3}	6	4
(Australia) Ar Rodionova	6^{5}	5
8	(Japan) N Hibino	7^{7}	7
3/WC	(China) Q Wang	6	6
(China) X Han	1	1
(Poland) K Kawa	3	6	6
(India) A Raina	6	0	1
WC	(Thailand) P Cheapchandej	0	3
Q	(Switzerland) L Küng	6	6
(Russia) V Flink	4	2
7	(China) L Zhu	6	6

Second round
1	(Ukraine) E Svitolina	6	6
Q	(Australia) S Sanders	1	2
LL	(Thailand) P Plipuech	0	1
8	(Japan) N Hibino	6	6
3/WC	(China) Q Wang	6	6
(Poland) K Kawa	3	4
Q	(Switzerland) L Küng	6	6
7	(China) L Zhu	3	1

Quarterfinals
1	(Ukraine) E Svitolina	4	2
8	(Japan) N Hibino	6	6
3/WC	(China) Q Wang	5	6	4
Q	(Switzerland) L Küng	7	4	6

Semifinals
8	(Japan) N Hibino	5	6	3
Q	(Switzerland) L Küng	7	4	6

=== Bottom half ===
First round
6	(China) Y Wang	1	6	6^{5}
(Romania) PM Țig	6	1	7^{7}
(China) X You	7^{7}	6
Q	(Australia) E Perez	6^{4}	2
(China) Xin Wang	3	0
Q	(Chinese Taipei) E-s Liang	6	6
(Serbia) N Kostić	6^{6}	0
4	(China) S Zheng	7^{8}	6
5	(Poland) M Linette	6	6
PR	(Ukraine) K Bondarenko	2	2
(China) S Peng	6	6
(China) Y Yuan	1	0
(Austria) B Haas	3	7	6
Q	(Japan) C Muramatsu	6	5	3
(China) Xiy Wang	6	6
2/WC	(Croatia) P Martić	3	4

Second round
(Romania) PM Țig	6	6
(China) X You	1	3
Q	(Chinese Taipei) E-s Liang	4	3
4	(China) S Zheng	6	6
5	(Poland) M Linette	7	6
(China) S Peng	5	1
(Austria) B Haas	3	4
(China) Xiy Wang	6	6

Quarterfinals
(Romania) PM Țig	6	6
4	(China) S Zheng	4	2
5	(Poland) M Linette	2	6	6
(China) Xiy Wang	6	3	3

Semifinals
(Romania) PM Țig	5	4
5	(Poland) M Linette	7	6

== Qualifying ==
=== Seeds ===
1. (China) Xun Fangying (qualifying competition)
2. (Japan) Chihiro Muramatsu (qualified)
3. (Chinese Taipei) Liang En-shuo (qualified)
4. (Norway) Ulrikke Eikeri (qualified)
5. (Australia) Ellen Perez (qualified)
6. (Thailand) Peangtarn Plipuech (qualifying competition, lucky loser)
7. (Switzerland) Leonie Küng (qualified)
8. (Australia) Storm Sanders (qualified)
9. (Japan) Eri Hozumi (first round)
10. (Japan) Junri Namigata (first round)
11. (Thailand) Nudnida Luangnam (first round)
12. (India) Riya Bhatia (qualifying competition)

=== Qualifiers ===
1. (Switzerland) Leonie Küng
2. (Japan) Chihiro Muramatsu
3. (Chinese Taipei) Liang En-shuo
4. (Norway) Ulrikke Eikeri
5. (Australia) Ellen Perez
6. (Australia) Storm Sanders

=== Lucky loser ===
1. (Thailand) Peangtarn Plipuech

=== Qualifying draw ===
==== First qualifier ====
First round
1	(China) Xun Fangying	6	6
(China) Zhang Ying	2	2
WC	(Thailand) Yanin Wisitwarapron	0	1
7	(Switzerland) Leonie Küng	6	6

Qualifying competition
1	(China) Xun Fangying	4	3
7	(Switzerland) Leonie Küng	6	6

==== Second qualifier ====
First round
2	(Japan) Chihiro Muramatsu	3	6	6
WC	(Thailand) Mananchaya Sawangkaew	6	0	3
(Italy) Lucrezia Stefanini	6	6
9	(Japan) Eri Hozumi	3	1

Qualifying competition
2	(Japan) Chihiro Muramatsu	5	7	6
(Italy) Lucrezia Stefanini	7	5	3

==== Third qualifier ====
First round
3	(Chinese Taipei) Liang En-shuo	6	6
(Hungary) Panna Udvardy	1	3
(Uzbekistan) Akgul Amanmuradova	1	6	6
10	(Japan) Junri Namigata	6	3	2

Qualifying competition
3	(Chinese Taipei) Liang En-shuo	7	6
(Uzbekistan) Akgul Amanmuradova	5	1

==== Fourth qualifier ====
First round
4	(Norway) Ulrikke Eikeri	7^{7}	6
WC	(Thailand) Punnin Kovapitukted	6^{1}	1
(United Kingdom) Sarah Beth Grey	7^{7}	6
11	(Thailand) Nudnida Luangnam	6^{5}	4

Qualifying competition
4	(Norway) Ulrikke Eikeri	6	6
(United Kingdom) Sarah Beth Grey	2	3

==== Fifth qualifier ====
First round
5	(Australia) Ellen Perez	6	6
WC	(Hong Kong) Ng Kwan-yau	3	2
(United Kingdom) Eden Silva	1	6	2
12	(India) Riya Bhatia	6	4	6

Qualifying competition
5	(Australia) Ellen Perez	6	6
12	(India) Riya Bhatia	0	1

==== Sixth qualifier ====
First round
6	(Thailand) Peangtarn Plipuech	3	6	6
(Japan) Nagi Hanatani	6	0	3
(Japan) Moyuka Uchijima	6	6^{1}	5
8	(Australia) Storm Sanders	4	7^{7}	7

Qualifying competition
6	(Thailand) Peangtarn Plipuech	7	3	2
8	(Australia) Storm Sanders	5	6	6
