= 2023 Thailand Open (tennis) =

- Date: 30 January – 5 February 2023
- Edition: 3rd
- Category: WTA 250
- Draw: 32S / 16D
- Prize money: $259,303
- Surface: Hard / outdoor
- Location: Hua Hin, Prachuap Khiri Khan, Thailand
- Venue: True Arena Hua Hin

Champions

Singles
- (China) Zhu Lin

Doubles
- (Chinese Taipei) Chan Hao-ching / (Chinese Taipei) Wu Fang-hsien
← 2020 ·	Hua Hin Championships	· 2024 →

The 2023 Thailand Open was a professional WTA tournament played on outdoor hard courts. It was the 3rd edition of the Thailand Open as part of the WTA 250 tournaments of the 2023 WTA Tour after the last two editions were cancelled due to the COVID-19 pandemic in Thailand. It took place at the True Arena Hua Hin in Hua Hin, Thailand, from 30 January to 5 February 2023.

== Champions ==
=== Singles ===
- (China) Zhu Lin def. (Ukraine) Lesia Tsurenko 6–4, 6–4

=== Doubles ===
- (Chinese Taipei) Chan Hao-ching / (Chinese Taipei) Wu Fang-hsien vs (China) Wang Xinyu / (China) Zhu Lin, 6–1, 7–6^{(8–6)}

== Points and prize money ==
=== Point distribution ===
Event	W	F	SF	QF	Round of 16	Round of 32	Q	Q2	Q1
Singles	280	180	110	60	30	1	18	12	1
Doubles	280	180	110	60	1	—	—	—	—

=== Prize money ===
Event	W	F	SF	QF	Round of 16	Round of 32	Q2	Q1
Women's singles	$34,228	$20,226	$11,275	$6,418	$3,922	$2,804	$2,075	$1,340
Women's doubles	$12,447	$7,000	$4,020	$2,400	$1,848	—	—	—

== Singles main draw entrants ==
=== Seeds ===
Country	Player	Rank^{1}	Seed
CAN	Bianca Andreescu	43	1
KAZ	Yulia Putintseva	47	2
CHN	Wang Xiyu	53	3
	Anna Kalinskaya	59	4
UKR	Marta Kostyuk	61	5
GER	Tatjana Maria	71	6
CHN	Wang Xinyu	79	7
CZE	Linda Fruhvirtová	82	8

- ^{1} Rankings as of January 16, 2023.

=== Other entrants ===
The following players received wildcards into the singles main draw:

- (Canada) Bianca Andreescu
- (United States) Bethanie Mattek-Sands
- (Thailand) Lanlana Tararudee

The following players received entry from the qualifying draw:

- (Philippines) Alexandra Eala
- (Chinese Taipei) Liang En-shuo
- Ekaterina Makarova
- Valeria Savinykh
- (Australia) Astra Sharma
- (Switzerland) Joanne Züger

=== Withdrawals ===
Before the tournament

- (Czech Republic) Marie Bouzková → replaced by (United Kingdom) Katie Boulter
- (France) Léolia Jeanjean → replaced by Anastasia Zakharova
- (Slovakia) Kristína Kučová → replaced by (Ukraine) Lesia Tsurenko
- (Poland) Magda Linette → replaced by (Sweden) Mirjam Björklund
- (United States) Claire Liu → replaced by (United Kingdom) Heather Watson
- (Australia) Ajla Tomljanović → replaced by (Japan) Nao Hibino

=== Retirements ===
- (Canada) Bianca Andreescu (illness)

== Doubles main draw entrants ==
=== Seeds ===
Country	Player	Country	Player	Rank^{1}	Seed
AUS	Ellen Perez	SLO	Tamara Zidanšek	67	1
JPN	Miyu Kato	INA	Aldila Sutjiadi	76	2
~~UKR~~	~~Marta Kostyuk~~	~~ROU~~	~~Elena-Gabriela Ruse~~	~~127~~	~~3~~
TPE	Latisha Chan	CHI	Alexa Guarachi	134	4

- ^{1} Rankings as of January 16, 2023

=== Other entrants ===
The following pairs received wildcards into the doubles main draw:

- (China) Han Xinyun / (United States) Bethanie Mattek-Sands
- (Thailand) Luksika Kumkhum / (Thailand) Peangtarn Plipuech

The following pair received entry as alternates:

- (Serbia) Natalija Stevanović / Anastasia Tikhonova

=== Withdrawals ===
Before the tournament

- (China) Han Xinyun / (Japan) Moyuka Uchijima → replaced by (China) Wang Xinyu / (China) Zhu Lin
- (Ukraine) Marta Kostyuk / (Romania) Elena-Gabriela Ruse → replaced by (Serbia) Natalija Stevanović / Anastasia Tikhonova

During the tournament

- (Czech Republic) Linda Fruhvirtová / Anna Kalinskaya (sickness)
