= 2023 Thailand Open – Doubles =

Doubles
- 2023 Thailand Open

Final
- Champions: (Chinese Taipei) Chan Hao-ching (Chinese Taipei) Wu Fang-hsien
- Runners-up: (China) Wang Xinyu (China) Zhu Lin
- Score: 6–1, 7–6^{(8–6)}

Events
Singles	Doubles
- Hua Hin Championships

Chan Hao-ching and Wu Fang-hsien defeated Wang Xinyu and Zhu Lin in the final, 6–1, 7–6^{(8–6)} to win the doubles tennis title at the 2023 Thailand Open.

Arina Rodionova and Storm Hunter were the reigning champions from 2020, when the event was last held, but they chose not to participate this year.

== Seeds ==
1. (Australia) Ellen Perez / (Slovenia) Tamara Zidanšek (quarterfinals)
2. (Japan) Miyu Kato / (Indonesia) Aldila Sutjiadi (first round)
3. (Ukraine) Marta Kostyuk / (Romania) Elena-Gabriela Ruse (withdrew)
4. (Chinese Taipei) Latisha Chan / (Chile) Alexa Guarachi (semifinals)

== Draw ==
Key

- Q = Qualifier
- WC = Wild card
- LL = Lucky loser
- Alt = Alternate
- ITF = ITF entry
- PR = Protected ranking
- SR = Special ranking
- SE = Special exempt
- JE = Junior exempt
- JR = Junior Accelerator Programme entrant
- CO = College Accelerator Programme entrant
- NG = Next Gen Accelerator Program entrant
- w/o = Walkover
- r = Retired
- d = Defaulted

=== Draw ===
First round
1	(Australia) E Perez (Slovenia) T Zidanšek	7^{7}	6
PR	(Australia) M Adamczak (Netherlands) R van der Hoek	6^{3}	1
(New Zealand) E Routliffe (China) Xiy Wang	1	5
(Chinese Taipei) H-c Chan (Chinese Taipei) F-h Wu	6	7
4	(Chinese Taipei) L Chan (Chile) A Guarachi	5	6	[10]
(Japan) N Hibino; I Khromacheva	7	3	[7]
WC	(China) X Han (United States) B Mattek-Sands	6	7
(Belgium) Y Bonaventure; E Yashina	3	5
(South Korea) N-l Han (South Korea) S-j Jang	6	5	[10]
A Gabueva; A Zakharova	3	7	[2]
(China) Xin Wang (China) L Zhu	6	4	[10]
Alt	(Serbia) N Stevanović; A Tikhonova	2	6	[7]
WC	(Thailand) L Kumkhum (Thailand) P Plipuech	6^{3}	6	[10]
(United Kingdom) H Dart (United Kingdom) H Watson	7^{7}	4	[6]
(Czech Republic) L Fruhvirtová; A Kalinskaya	6	6
2	(Japan) M Kato (Indonesia) A Sutjiadi	3	0

Quarterfinals
1	(Australia) E Perez (Slovenia) T Zidanšek	2	4
(Chinese Taipei) H-c Chan (Chinese Taipei) F-h Wu	6	6
4	(Chinese Taipei) L Chan (Chile) A Guarachi	6	6
WC	(China) X Han (United States) B Mattek-Sands	4	4
(South Korea) N-l Han (South Korea) S-j Jang	3	3
(China) Xin Wang (China) L Zhu	6	6
WC	(Thailand) L Kumkhum (Thailand) P Plipuech	w/o
(Czech Republic) L Fruhvirtová; A Kalinskaya

Semifinals
(Chinese Taipei) H-c Chan (Chinese Taipei) F-h Wu	1	6	[10]
4	(Chinese Taipei) L Chan (Chile) A Guarachi	6	4	[7]
(China) Xin Wang (China) L Zhu	6	6
WC	(Thailand) L Kumkhum (Thailand) P Plipuech	2	3

Final
(Chinese Taipei) H-c Chan (Chinese Taipei) F-h Wu	6	7^{8}
(China) Xin Wang (China) L Zhu	1	6^{6}
