= 2024 Thailand Open – Singles =

Singles
- 2024 Thailand Open

Final
- Champion: Diana Shnaider
- Runner-up: (China) Zhu Lin
- Score: 6–3, 2–6, 6–1

Details
- Draw: 32 (6 Q / 3 WC )
- Seeds: 8

Events
Singles	Doubles
- Hua Hin Championships

Diana Shnaider defeated the defending champion Zhu Lin in the final, 6–3, 2–6, 6–1 to win the singles tennis title at the 2024 Thailand Open. It was her first WTA Tour singles title.

== Seeds ==
1. (Poland) Magda Linette (first round)
2. (China) Zhu Lin (final)
3. (China) Wang Xinyu (semifinals)
4. (Germany) Tatjana Maria (second round)
5. (China) Wang Xiyu (second round)
6. (China) Yuan Yue (first round)
7. (Kazakhstan) Yulia Putintseva (quarterfinals)
8. (Slovakia) Anna Karolína Schmiedlová (second round)

== Draw ==
Key

- Q = Qualifier
- WC = Wild card
- LL = Lucky loser
- Alt = Alternate
- ITF = ITF entry
- PR = Protected ranking
- SR = Special ranking
- SE = Special exempt
- JE = Junior exempt
- JR = Junior Accelerator Programme entrant
- CO = College Accelerator Programme entrant
- NG = Next Gen Accelerator Program entrant
- w/o = Walkover
- r = Retired
- d = Defaulted

=== Finals ===
Semifinals
Diana Shnaider	6	7^{7}
3	(China) Wang Xinyu	2	6^{5}
(China) Wang Yafan	3	2
2	(China) Zhu Lin	6	6

Final
Diana Shnaider	6	2	6
2	(China) Zhu Lin	3	6	1

=== Top half ===
First round
1	(Poland) M Linette	4	6	1
D Shnaider	6	1	6
WC	(Thailand) L Tararudee	6	4	1
(Spain) P Badosa	3	6	6
Q	(Hungary) D Gálfi	6	6
WC	(Australia) A Tomljanović	3	0
PR	(China) Q Wang	1	1
5	(China) Xiy Wang	6	6
3	(China) Xin Wang	5
(United States) E Bektas	2^{r}
(Japan) N Hibino	7^{7}	6
K Rakhimova	6^{4}	0
(Brazil) L Pigossi	1	2
(Switzerland) V Golubic	6	6
WC	(Thailand) T Naklo	7	3	2
7	(Kazakhstan) Y Putintseva	5	6	6

Second round
D Shnaider	6	3
(Spain) P Badosa	2	4^{r}
Q	(Hungary) D Gálfi	6	3	7
5	(China) Xiy Wang	4	6	5
3	(China) Xin Wang	7	6
(Japan) N Hibino	5	4
(Switzerland) V Golubic	6^{0}	6^{1}
7	(Kazakhstan) Y Putintseva	7^{7}	7^{7}

Quarterfinals
D Shnaider	6	6
Q	(Hungary) D Gálfi	2	1
3	(China) Xin Wang	6	3	6
7	(Kazakhstan) Y Putintseva	1	6	3

Semifinals
D Shnaider	6	7^{7}
3	(China) Xin Wang	2	6^{5}

=== Bottom half ===
First round
8	(Slovakia) AK Schmiedlová	7^{7}	7^{10}
Q	(Japan) M Hontama	6^{5}	6^{8}
Q	A Korneeva	2	4
(China) Y Wang	6	6
(Slovenia) T Zidanšek	2	2
(United States) K Volynets	6	6
Q	(Netherlands) A Hartono	3	1
4	(Germany) T Maria	6	6
6	(China) Y Yuan	6^{6}	6	3
(Australia) Ar Rodionova	7^{8}	4	6
(China) Z Bai	7^{7}	6
Q	(France) C Paquet	6^{5}	3
(Czech Republic) L Fruhvirtová	6	6
LL	A Tikhonova	3	1
Q	(Australia) T Preston	4	5
2	(China) L Zhu	6	7

Second round
8	(Slovakia) AK Schmiedlová	2	4
(China) Y Wang	6	6
(United States) K Volynets	5	6	6
4	(Germany) T Maria	7	2	2
(Australia) Ar Rodionova	3	6	6
(China) Z Bai	6	1	0
(Czech Republic) L Fruhvirtová	2	2
2	(China) L Zhu	6	6

Quarterfinals
(China) Y Wang	1	6	7^{7}
(United States) K Volynets	6	3	6^{4}
(Australia) Ar Rodionova	3	3
2	(China) L Zhu	6	6

Semifinals
(China) Y Wang	3	2
2	(China) L Zhu	6	6

== Qualifying ==
=== Seeds ===
1. (Australia) Kimberly Birrell (first round)
2. (Australia) Olivia Gadecki (first round)
3. (Japan) Mai Hontama (qualified)
4. (Hungary) Dalma Gálfi (qualified)
5. (France) Chloé Paquet (qualified)
6. (Netherlands) Arianne Hartono (qualified)
7. Anastasia Tikhonova (qualifying competition, lucky loser)
8. (Australia) Daria Saville (qualifying competition)
9. Ekaterina Makarova (qualifying competition)
10. (Hungary) Panna Udvardy (qualifying competition)
11. Alina Korneeva (qualified)
12. (Japan) Himeno Sakatsume (qualifying competition)

=== Qualifiers ===
1. Alina Korneeva
2. (Australia) Taylah Preston
3. (Japan) Mai Hontama
4. (Hungary) Dalma Gálfi
5. (France) Chloé Paquet
6. (Netherlands) Arianne Hartono

=== Lucky loser ===
1. Anastasia Tikhonova

=== Qualifying draw ===
==== First qualifier ====
First round
1	(Australia) Kimberly Birrell	7^{7}	2	4
Anastasia Zakharova	6^{4}	6	6
(Poland) Katarzyna Kawa	6^{1}	1
11	Alina Korneeva	7^{7}	6

Qualifying competition
Anastasia Zakharova	2	3
11	Alina Korneeva	6	6

==== Second qualifier ====
First round
2	(Australia) Olivia Gadecki	5	2
(Australia) Taylah Preston	7	6
WC	(Thailand) Lidia Podgorichani	4	0
9	Ekaterina Makarova	6	6

Qualifying competition
(Australia) Taylah Preston	6	6
9	Ekaterina Makarova	3	1

==== Third qualifier ====
First round
3	(Japan) Mai Hontama	6	6
(Switzerland) Lulu Sun	2	2
WC	(China) Zheng Saisai	3	5
7	Anastasia Tikhonova	6	7

Qualifying competition
3	(Japan) Mai Hontama	6	6
7	Anastasia Tikhonova	1	3

==== Fourth qualifier ====
First round
4	(Hungary) Dalma Gálfi	7	5	6
(Uzbekistan) Nigina Abduraimova	5	7	4
WC	(Thailand) Viera Deeperm	2	2
12	(Japan) Himeno Sakatsume	6	6

Qualifying competition
4	(Hungary) Dalma Gálfi	7	6
12	(Japan) Himeno Sakatsume	5	4

==== Fifth qualifier ====
First round
5	(France) Chloé Paquet	6	6
(Romania) Irina Bara	1	0
(Greece) Valentini Grammatikopoulou	3	3
10	(Hungary) Panna Udvardy	6	6

Qualifying competition
5	(France) Chloé Paquet	6	6
10	(Hungary) Panna Udvardy	4	4

==== Sixth qualifier ====
First round
6	(Netherlands) Arianne Hartono	6	6
WC	(Thailand) Salakthip Ounmuang	1	0
PR	(France) Amandine Hesse	3	6^{4}
8	(Australia) Daria Saville	6	7^{7}

Qualifying competition
6	(Netherlands) Arianne Hartono	7	6
8	(Australia) Daria Saville	5	3
