= 2019 Thailand Open (tennis) =

- Date: 28 January – 3 February 2019
- Edition: 1st
- Category: WTA International
- Draw: 32S / 16D
- Prize money: $250,000
- Surface: Hard, outdoor
- Location: Hua Hin, Prachuap Khiri Khan, Thailand
- Venue: True Arena Hua Hin

Champions

Singles
- (Ukraine) Dayana Yastremska

Doubles
- (Romania) Irina-Camelia Begu / (Romania) Monica Niculescu
- Hua Hin Championships

The 2019 Thailand Open, sponsored by Toyota, was a tennis tournament played on outdoor hard courts. It was the 1st edition of the Hua Hin Championships as part of the WTA International tournaments of the 2019 WTA Tour. It took place at the True Arena Hua Hin in Hua Hin, Thailand, from 28 January 2019 to 3 February 2019.

This tournament replaced the Taiwan Open on the WTA Tour.

== Finals ==
=== Singles ===
- (Ukraine) Dayana Yastremska defeated (Australia) Ajla Tomljanović, 6–2, 2–6, 7–6^{(7–3)}

=== Doubles ===
- (Romania) Irina-Camelia Begu / (Romania) Monica Niculescu defeated (Russia) Anna Blinkova / (China) Wang Yafan, 2–6, 6–1, [12–10]

== Points and prize money ==
=== Point distribution ===
Event	W	F	SF	QF	Round of 16	Round of 32	Q	Q2	Q1
Singles	280	180	110	60	30	1	18	12	1
Doubles	280	180	110	60	1	—N/a	—N/a	—N/a	—N/a

=== Prize money ===
Event	W	F	SF	QF	Round of 16	Round of 32	Q2	Q1
Singles	$43,000	$21,400	$11,500	$6,175	$3,400	$2,100	$1,020	$600
Doubles	$12,300	$6,400	$3,435	$1,820	$960	—N/a	—N/a	—N/a

== Singles main draw entrants ==
=== Seeds ===
Country	Player	Rank^{1}	Seed
ESP	Garbiñe Muguruza	18	1
FRA	Caroline Garcia	19	2
TPE	Hsieh Su-wei	27	3
CHN	Zheng Saisai	40	4
CHN	Zhang Shuai	42	5
AUS	Ajla Tomljanović	47	6
FRA	Pauline Parmentier	55	7
UKR	Dayana Yastremska	57	8

- ^{1} Rankings as of January 14, 2019.

=== Other entrants ===
The following players received wildcards into the singles main draw:

- (France) Caroline Garcia
- (Germany) Sabine Lisicki
- (China) Peng Shuai

The following players received entry from the qualifying draw:

- (United States) Jennifer Brady
- (China) Duan Yingying
- (Australia) Priscilla Hon
- (France) Chloé Paquet
- (Switzerland) Conny Perrin
- (Netherlands) Arantxa Rus

=== Withdrawals ===
Before the tournament

- (Romania) Mihaela Buzărnescu → replaced by (Russia) Anna Blinkova
- (Kazakhstan) Zarina Diyas → replaced by (Ukraine) Kateryna Kozlova
- (United States) Bethanie Mattek-Sands → replaced by (Romania) Monica Niculescu
- (China) Wang Qiang → replaced by (Luxembourg) Mandy Minella

=== Retirements ===
- (Hungary) Tímea Babos (dizziness)
- (China) Zhang Shuai (illness)

== Doubles main draw entrants ==
=== Seeds ===
Country	Player	Country	Player	Rank^{1}	Seed
JPN	Miyu Kato	JPN	Makoto Ninomiya	67	1
ROU	Irina-Camelia Begu	ROU	Monica Niculescu	67	2
CHN	Peng Shuai	CHN	Yang Zhaoxuan	77	3
USA	Kaitlyn Christian	CHN	Duan Yingying	112	4

- ^{1} Rankings as of January 14, 2019

=== Other entrants ===
The following pairs received wildcards into the doubles main draw:

- (Germany) Sabine Lisicki / (Australia) Ajla Tomljanović
- (Thailand) Nudnida Luangnam / (Thailand) Peangtarn Plipuech
