= 2019 Thailand Open – Doubles =

Doubles
- 2019 Thailand Open

Final
- Champions: (Romania) Irina-Camelia Begu (Romania) Monica Niculescu
- Runners-up: (Russia) Anna Blinkova (China) Wang Yafan
- Score: 2–6, 6–1, [12–10]

Details
- Draw: 16
- Seeds: 4

Events
Singles	Doubles
- Hua Hin Championships

Duan Yingying and Wang Yafan were the champions the last time the event was held in 2017, but chose not to participate together. Duan partnered Kaitlyn Christian, but they lost in the first round to Mona Barthel and Sara Sorribes Tormo.

Wang played alongside Anna Blinkova, but lost in the final to Irina-Camelia Begu and Monica Niculescu, 6–2, 1–6, [10–12].

== Seeds ==
1. (Japan) Miyu Kato / (Japan) Makoto Ninomiya (first round)
2. (Romania) Irina-Camelia Begu / (Romania) Monica Niculescu (champions)
3. (China) Peng Shuai / (China) Yang Zhaoxuan (semifinals)
4. (United States) Kaitlyn Christian / (China) Duan Yingying (first round)

== Draw ==
Key

- Q = Qualifier
- WC = Wild card
- LL = Lucky loser
- Alt = Alternate
- ITF = ITF entry
- PR = Protected ranking
- SR = Special ranking
- SE = Special exempt
- JE = Junior exempt
- JR = Junior Accelerator Programme entrant
- CO = College Accelerator Programme entrant
- NG = Next Gen Accelerator Program entrant
- w/o = Walkover
- r = Retired
- d = Defaulted

=== Draw ===
First round
1	(Japan) M Kato (Japan) M Ninomiya	2	2
(Russia) A Blinkova (China) Y Wang	6	6
(Switzerland) V Golubic (Netherlands) A Rus	6	3	[5]
(Georgia (country)) O Kalashnikova (Montenegro) D Kovinić	2	6	[10]
3	(China) S Peng (China) Z Yang	7^{9}	6
(United States) J Brady (United States) C Dolehide	6^{7}	2
(Thailand) L Kumkhum (Sweden) C Lister	6	7^{7}
(Australia) P Hon (Slovenia) T Zidanšek	2	6^{2}
WC	(Germany) S Lisicki (Australia) A Tomljanović	4	6	[10]
(China) X Han (Croatia) D Jurak	6	1	[12]
(Germany) M Barthel (Spain) S Sorribes Tormo	7^{8}	6
4	(United States) K Christian (China) Y Duan	6^{6}	4
WC	(Thailand) N Luangnam (Thailand) P Plipuech	1	5
(Japan) K Nara (China) S Zheng	6	7
(China) X Jiang (China) Q Tang	5	3
2	(Romania) I-C Begu (Romania) M Niculescu	7	6

Quarterfinals
(Russia) A Blinkova (China) Y Wang	6	6
(Georgia (country)) O Kalashnikova (Montenegro) D Kovinić	3	4
3	(China) S Peng (China) Z Yang	6	6
(Thailand) L Kumkhum (Sweden) C Lister	1	4
(China) X Han (Croatia) D Jurak	6	1	[10]
(Germany) M Barthel (Spain) S Sorribes Tormo	4	6	[6]
(Japan) K Nara (China) S Zheng	2	5
2	(Romania) I-C Begu (Romania) M Niculescu	6	7

Semifinals
(Russia) A Blinkova (China) Y Wang	7^{7}	7
3	(China) S Peng (China) Z Yang	6^{5}	5
(China) X Han (Croatia) D Jurak	6^{4}	2
2	(Romania) I-C Begu (Romania) M Niculescu	7^{7}	6

Final
(Russia) A Blinkova (China) Y Wang	6	1	[10]
2	(Romania) I-C Begu (Romania) M Niculescu	2	6	[12]
