= 2019 Thailand Open – Singles =

Singles
- 2019 Thailand Open

Final
- Champion: (Ukraine) Dayana Yastremska
- Runner-up: (Australia) Ajla Tomljanović
- Score: 6–2, 2–6, 7–6^{(7–3)}

Details
- Draw: 32 (6 Q / 4 WC )
- Seeds: 8

Events
Singles	Doubles
- Hua Hin Championships

Belinda Bencic was the champion the last time the event was held in 2017, but chose to compete in St. Petersburg instead.

Dayana Yastremska won the title, defeating Ajla Tomljanović in the final, 6–2, 2–6, 7–6^{(7–3)}. It was her second WTA Tour title.

== Seeds ==
1. (Spain) Garbiñe Muguruza (quarterfinals)
2. (France) Caroline Garcia (first round)
3. (Chinese Taipei) Hsieh Su-wei (first round)
4. (China) Zheng Saisai (quarterfinals)
5. (China) Zhang Shuai (second round, retired)
6. (Australia) Ajla Tomljanović (final)
7. (France) Pauline Parmentier (first round)
8. (Ukraine) Dayana Yastremska (champion)

== Draw ==
Key

- Q = Qualifier
- WC = Wild card
- LL = Lucky loser
- Alt = Alternate
- ITF = ITF entry
- PR = Protected ranking
- SR = Special ranking
- SE = Special exempt
- JE = Junior exempt
- JR = Junior Accelerator Programme entrant
- CO = College Accelerator Programme entrant
- NG = Next Gen Accelerator Program entrant
- w/o = Walkover
- r = Retired
- d = Defaulted

=== Finals ===
Semifinals
8	(Ukraine) Dayana Yastremska	6	6
(Poland) Magda Linette	4	3
6	(Australia) Ajla Tomljanović	6	6
(Slovenia) Tamara Zidanšek	4	1

Final
8	(Ukraine) Dayana Yastremska	6	2	7^{7}
6	(Australia) Ajla Tomljanović	2	6	6^{3}

=== Top half ===
First round
1	(Spain) G Muguruza	6	6
WC	(Germany) S Lisicki	3	4
(Germany) M Barthel	6	1	6
(France) F Ferro	1	6	4
WC	(China) S Peng	6	6
Q	(France) C Paquet	2	3
Q	(Netherlands) A Rus	0	3
8	(Ukraine) D Yastremska	6	6
3	(Chinese Taipei) S-w Hsieh	4	6^{2}
(Romania) M Niculescu	6	7^{7}
Q	(Australia) P Hon	1	6	2
(Poland) M Linette	6	2	6
(Russia) A Blinkova	7	2	1
(China) Y Wang	5	6	6
(Thailand) L Kumkhum	2	1
5	(China) S Zhang	6	6

Second round
1	(Spain) G Muguruza	6	7
(Germany) M Barthel	3	5
WC	(China) S Peng	1	4
8	(Ukraine) D Yastremska	6	6
(Romania) M Niculescu	6	3	2
(Poland) M Linette	4	6	6
(China) Y Wang	4
5	(China) S Zhang	1^{r}

Quarterfinals
1	(Spain) G Muguruza	6^{5}	1
8	(Ukraine) D Yastremska	7^{7}	6
(Poland) M Linette	6	6
(China) Y Wang	2	3

Semifinals
8	(Ukraine) D Yastremska	6	6
(Poland) M Linette	4	3

=== Bottom half ===
First round
6	(Australia) A Tomljanović	6	7^{8}
(Switzerland) S Vögele	1	6^{6}
Q	(Switzerland) C Perrin	4	6	3
(Ukraine) K Kozlova	6	3	6
(Romania) I-C Begu	6	6
(Russia) E Rodina	2	0
(Luxembourg) M Minella	7^{10}	4	4
4	(China) S Zheng	6^{8}	6	6
7	(France) P Parmentier	6	3	4
Q	(China) Y Duan	1	6	6
(Switzerland) V Golubic	6	6
(Spain) S Sorribes Tormo	2	4
(Slovenia) T Zidanšek	6	3
(Hungary) T Babos	0	1^{r}
Q	(United States) J Brady	6	7^{7}
2/WC	(France) C Garcia	4	6^{3}

Second round
6	(Australia) A Tomljanović	7^{7}	6
(Ukraine) K Kozlova	6^{0}	1
(Romania) I-C Begu	2	4
4	(China) S Zheng	6	6
Q	(China) Y Duan	6^{4}	5
(Switzerland) V Golubic	7^{7}	7
(Slovenia) T Zidanšek	6	0	7^{11}
Q	(United States) J Brady	3	6	6^{9}

Quarterfinals
6	(Australia) A Tomljanović	6	6
4	(China) S Zheng	1	3
(Switzerland) V Golubic	6	1	2
(Slovenia) T Zidanšek	4	6	6

Semifinals
6	(Australia) A Tomljanović	6	6
(Slovenia) T Zidanšek	4	1

== Qualifying ==
=== Seeds ===
1. (Netherlands) Arantxa Rus (qualified)
2. (United States) Jennifer Brady (qualified)
3. (United States) Caroline Dolehide (first round)
4. (Australia) Priscilla Hon (qualified)
5. (Switzerland) Conny Perrin (qualified)
6. (China) Han Xinyun (qualifying competition)
7. (China) Duan Yingying (qualified)
8. (Japan) Kurumi Nara (qualifying competition)
9. (Montenegro) Danka Kovinić (first round)
10. (Japan) Ayano Shimizu (qualifying competition)
11. (India) Ankita Raina (qualifying competition)
12. (India) Karman Thandi (first round)

=== Qualifiers ===
1. (Netherlands) Arantxa Rus
2. (United States) Jennifer Brady
3. (France) Chloé Paquet
4. (Australia) Priscilla Hon
5. (Switzerland) Conny Perrin
6. (China) Duan Yingying

=== Qualifying draw ===
==== First qualifier ====
First round
1	(Netherlands) Arantxa Rus	4	6	6
WC	(Thailand) Nudnida Luangnam	6	2	1
(Chinese Taipei) Liang En-shuo	6	6
9	(Montenegro) Danka Kovinić	1	3

Qualifying competition
1	(Netherlands) Arantxa Rus	6	7^{7}
(Chinese Taipei) Liang En-shuo	2	6^{2}

==== Second qualifier ====
First round
2	(United States) Jennifer Brady	6	6
(Slovakia) Zuzana Zlochová	1	1
(China) Xun Fangying	4	0
8	(Japan) Kurumi Nara	6	6

Qualifying competition
2	(United States) Jennifer Brady	6	6
8	(Japan) Kurumi Nara	1	2

==== Third qualifier ====
First round
3	(United States) Caroline Dolehide	6^{7}	6	5
(China) Yang Zhaoxuan	7^{9}	2	7
(France) Chloé Paquet	6	7
12	(India) Karman Thandi	3	5

Qualifying competition
(China) Yang Zhaoxuan	3	3
(France) Chloé Paquet	6	6

==== Fourth qualifier ====
First round
4	(Australia) Priscilla Hon	6	6
(United Kingdom) Naomi Broady	3	2
(Thailand) Peangtarn Plipuech	2	4
10	(Japan) Ayano Shimizu	6	6

Qualifying competition
4	(Australia) Priscilla Hon	6	6
10	(Japan) Ayano Shimizu	2	3

==== Fifth qualifier ====
First round
5	(Switzerland) Conny Perrin	6	6
(China) Zhang Yuxuan	0	1
WC	(Hong Kong) Ng Kwan-yau	0	0
11	(India) Ankita Raina	6	6

Qualifying competition
5	(Switzerland) Conny Perrin	7^{7}	6
11	(India) Ankita Raina	6^{1}	3

==== Sixth qualifier ====
First round
6	(China) Han Xinyun	6	6
WC	(Thailand) Yanin Wisitwarapron	1	1
WC	(Thailand) Watsachol Sawatdee	3	3
7	(China) Duan Yingying	6	6

Qualifying competition
6	(China) Han Xinyun	1	6	5
7	(China) Duan Yingying	6	2	7
