= 2023 Thailand Open – Singles =

Singles
- 2023 Thailand Open

Final
- Champion: (China) Zhu Lin
- Runner-up: (Ukraine) Lesia Tsurenko
- Score: 6–4, 6–4

Details
- Draw: 32 (6 Q / 3 WC )
- Seeds: 8

Events
| Singles | Doubles |
- Hua Hin Championships

Zhu Lin defeated Lesia Tsurenko in the final, 6–4, 6–4 to win the women's singles tennis title at the 2023 Thailand Open. It was her first WTA Tour singles title.

Magda Linette was the reigning champion from 2020, when the event was last held, but withdrew before the tournament.

== Seeds ==
1. (Canada) Bianca Andreescu (semifinals, retired)
2. (Kazakhstan) Yulia Putintseva (first round)
3. (China) Wang Xiyu (first round)
4. Anna Kalinskaya (second round)
5. (Ukraine) Marta Kostyuk (quarterfinals)
6. (Germany) Tatjana Maria (quarterfinals)
7. (China) Wang Xinyu (semifinals)
8. (Czech Republic) Linda Fruhvirtová (second round)

== Draw ==
Key

- Q = Qualifier
- WC = Wild card
- LL = Lucky loser
- Alt = Alternate
- ITF = ITF entry
- PR = Protected ranking
- SR = Special ranking
- SE = Special exempt
- JE = Junior exempt
- JR = Junior Accelerator Programme entrant
- CO = College Accelerator Programme entrant
- NG = Next Gen Accelerator Program entrant
- w/o = Walkover
- r = Retired
- d = Defaulted

=== Finals ===
Semifinals
1/WC | (Canada) Bianca Andreescu | 5 | 0^{r}
(Ukraine) Lesia Tsurenko | 7 | 4
(China) Zhu Lin | 6 | 6
7 | (China) Wang Xinyu | 2 | 4

Final
(Ukraine) Lesia Tsurenko | 4 | 4
(China) Zhu Lin | 6 | 6

=== Top half ===
First round
1/WC | (Canada) B Andreescu | 6 | 6
(United Kingdom) H Dart | 3 | 4
(Slovakia) AK Schmiedlová | 6 | 5 | 3
A Zakharova | 3 | 7 | 6
Q | V Savinykh | 0 | 2
(Japan) N Hibino | 6 | 6
Q | (Chinese Taipei) E-s Liang | 7^{9} | 3 | 0
5 | (Ukraine) M Kostyuk | 6^{7} | 6 | 6
4 | A Kalinskaya | 6 | 6
Q | E Makarova | 1 | 1
(Belgium) Y Bonaventure | 3 | 6 | 4
(Ukraine) L Tsurenko | 6 | 4 | 6
(Ukraine) D Yastremska | 6 | 6^{3} | 6
(Japan) M Uchijima | 3 | 7^{7} | 2
Q | (Philippines) A Eala | 2 | 2
6 | (Germany) T Maria | 6 | 6

Second round
1/WC | (Canada) B Andreescu | 6 | 7
A Zakharova | 2 | 5
(Japan) N Hibino | 3 | 6^{7}
5 | (Ukraine) M Kostyuk | 6 | 7^{9}
4 | A Kalinskaya | 0 | 7^{7} | 4
(Ukraine) L Tsurenko | 6 | 6^{3} | 6
(Ukraine) D Yastremska | 0 | 4
6 | (Germany) T Maria | 6 | 6

Quarterfinals
1/WC | (Canada) B Andreescu | 6 | 7^{7}
5 | (Ukraine) M Kostyuk | 0 | 6^{3}
(Ukraine) L Tsurenko | 6 | 6
6 | (Germany) T Maria | 1 | 1

Semifinals
1/WC | (Canada) B Andreescu | 5 | 0^{r}
(Ukraine) L Tsurenko | 7 | 4

=== Bottom half ===
First round
8 | (Czech Republic) L Fruhvirtová | 6 | 6
WC | (United States) B Mattek-Sands | 3 | 1
Q | (Australia) A Sharma | 2 | 3
(Slovenia) T Zidanšek | 6 | 6
(United Kingdom) K Boulter | 3 | 6 | 3
(South Korea) S-j Jang | 6 | 4 | 6
(China) L Zhu | 4 | 6 | 6
3 | (China) Xiy Wang | 6 | 3 | 0
7 | (China) Xin Wang | 6 | 6
Q | (Switzerland) J Züger | 2 | 2
WC | (Thailand) L Tararudee | 2 | 4
(Sweden) M Björklund | 6 | 6
(Romania) E-G Ruse | 4 | 6 | 4
(South Korea) N-l Han | 6 | 1 | 6
(United Kingdom) H Watson | 5 | 6 | 7^{7}
2 | (Kazakhstan) Y Putintseva | 7 | 4 | 6^{5}

Second round
8 | (Czech Republic) L Fruhvirtová | 3 | 6 | 4
(Slovenia) T Zidanšek | 6 | 4 | 6
(South Korea) S-j Jang | 4 | 6^{6}
(China) L Zhu | 6 | 7^{8}
7 | (China) Xin Wang | 6 | 6
(Sweden) M Björklund | 3 | 3
(South Korea) N-l Han | 3 | 7 | 4
(United Kingdom) H Watson | 6 | 5 | 6

Quarterfinals
(Slovenia) T Zidanšek | 2 | 2
(China) L Zhu | 6 | 6
7 | (China) Xin Wang | 6 | 6^{6} | 6
(United Kingdom) H Watson | 3 | 7^{8} | 4

Semifinals
(China) L Zhu | 6 | 6
7 | (China) Xin Wang | 2 | 4

== Qualifying ==
=== Seeds ===
1. Anastasia Zakharova (moved to main draw)
2. (Turkey) İpek Öz (qualifying competition)
3. (Switzerland) Joanne Züger (qualified)
4. (Philippines) Alex Eala (qualified)
5. (Serbia) Natalija Stevanović (qualifying competition)
6. (Australia) Astra Sharma (qualified)
7. Anastasia Tikhonova (first round)
8. Ekaterina Makarova (qualified)
9. Kristina Dmitruk (qualifying competition)
10. Irina Khromacheva (first round, retired)
11. Valeria Savinykh (qualified)
12. (Liechtenstein) Kathinka von Deichmann (first round)

=== Qualifiers ===
1. Ekaterina Makarova
2. (Chinese Taipei) Liang En-shuo
3. (Switzerland) Joanne Züger
4. (Philippines) Alex Eala
5. Valeria Savinykh
6. (Australia) Astra Sharma

=== Qualifying draw ===
==== First qualifier ====
First round
Alt | (Japan) Miyu Kato | 6 | 6
(Thailand) Luksika Kumkhum | 4 | 1
WC | (Thailand) Aunchisa Chanta | 4 | 6 | 5
8 | Ekaterina Makarova | 6 | 3 | 7

Qualifying competition
Alt | (Japan) Miyu Kato | 4 | 1
8 | Ekaterina Makarova | 6 | 6

==== Second qualifier ====
First round
2 | (Turkey) İpek Öz | 6 | 6
(Japan) Haruka Kaji | 3 | 0
(Chinese Taipei) Liang En-shuo | 6 | 7^{9}
12 | (Liechtenstein) Kathinka von Deichmann | 3 | 6^{7}

Qualifying competition
2 | (Turkey) İpek Öz | 6^{8} | 4
(Chinese Taipei) Liang En-shuo | 7^{10} | 6

==== Third qualifier ====
First round
3 | (Switzerland) Joanne Züger | 6 | 6
WC | (Ukraine) Ivanna Yastremska | 1 | 0
(Thailand) Peangtarn Plipuech | 6 | 4 | 7^{9}
7 | Anastasia Tikhonova | 3 | 6 | 6^{7}

Qualifying competition
3 | (Switzerland) Joanne Züger | 7 | 6
(Thailand) Peangtarn Plipuech | 5 | 3

==== Fourth qualifier ====
First round
4 | (Philippines) Alex Eala | 6 | 7^{8}
WC | (China) Han Xinyun | 1 | 6^{6}
Ekaterina Yashina | 3 | 2
9 | Kristina Dmitruk | 6 | 6

Qualifying competition
4 | (Philippines) Alex Eala | 6 | 7
9 | Kristina Dmitruk | 2 | 5

==== Fifth qualifier ====
First round
5 | (Serbia) Natalija Stevanović | 6 | 7^{7}
PR | (Australia) Kaylah McPhee | 2 | 6^{3}
(China) Gao Xinyu | 5 | 6 | 4
11 | Valeria Savinykh | 7 | 2 | 6

Qualifying competition
5 | (Serbia) Natalija Stevanović | 5 | 0
11 | Valeria Savinykh | 7 | 6

==== Sixth qualifier ====
First round
6 | (Australia) Astra Sharma | 6 | 6
WC | (Thailand) Chompoothip Jundakate | 2 | 2
(Australia) Ellen Perez | 6 | 0
10 | Irina Khromacheva | 1 | 0^{r}

Qualifying competition
6 | (Australia) Astra Sharma | 6 | 7
(Australia) Ellen Perez | 2 | 5
