= Chan Hao-ching =

Taiwanese tennis player (born 1993)

Chan Hao-ching 詹皓晴
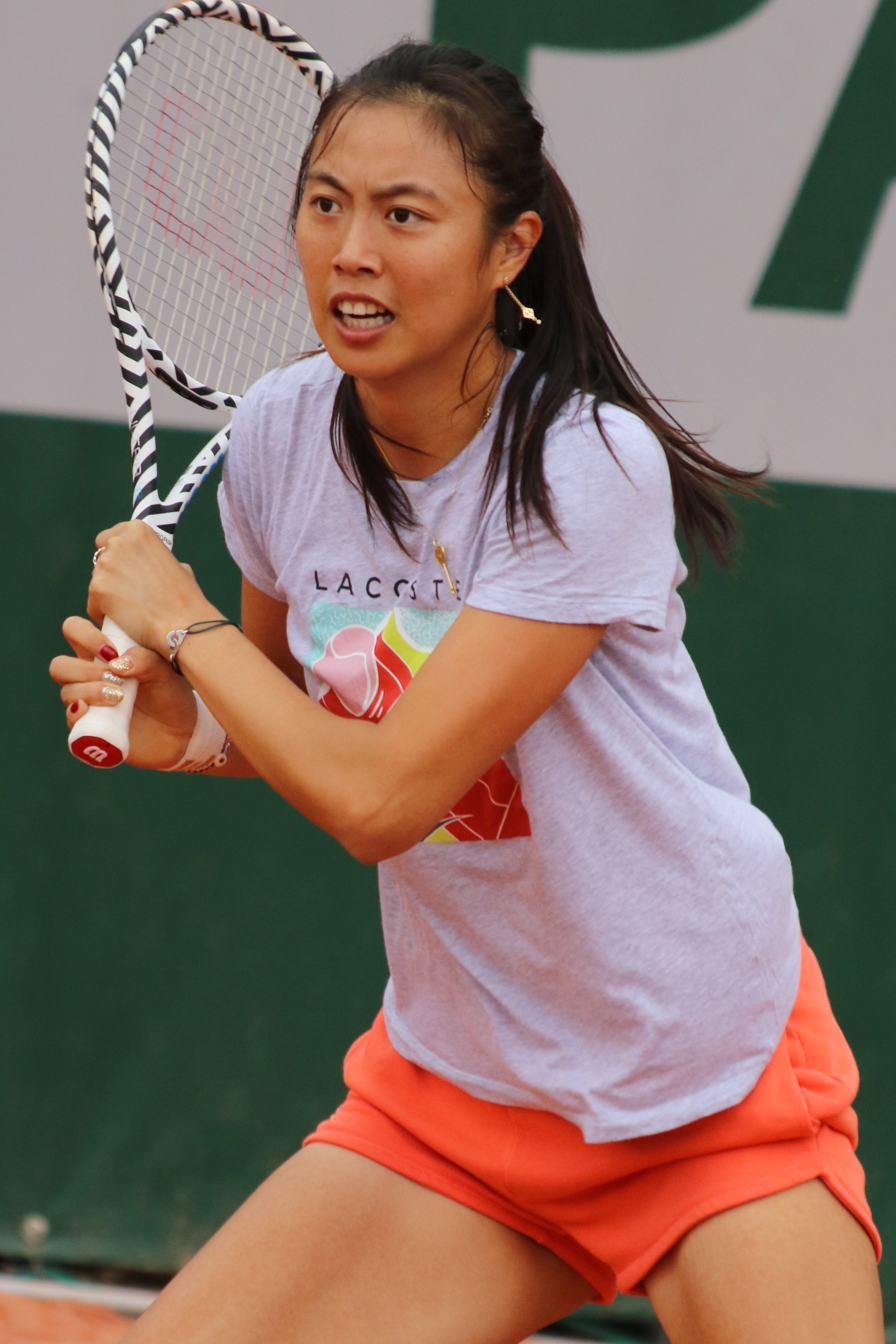
- Chan at the 2019 French Open
- Country (sports): Chinese Taipei
- Residence: Taipei, Taiwan
- Born: 19 September 1993 (age 33) Dongshi, Taiwan
- Height: 1.75 m (5 ft 9 in)
- Turned pro: 2008
- Plays: Right-handed (two-handed backhand)
- Coach: Chan Yuan-liang (her father)
- Prize money: $4,213,637

Singles
- Career record: 6–36
- Career titles: 0
- Highest ranking: No. 1,070 (4 March 2024)

Doubles
- Career record: 482–338
- Career titles: 24
- Highest ranking: No. 5 (27 June 2016)
- Current ranking: No. 46 (10 August 2026)

Grand Slam doubles results
- Australian Open: SF (2020)
- French Open: SF (2018)
- Wimbledon: F (2017)
- US Open: SF (2024)

Other doubles tournaments
- Tour Finals: SF (2015, 2024)
- Olympic Games: QF (2016)

Grand Slam mixed doubles results
- Australian Open: 2R (2015, 2018, 2019, 2020)
- French Open: QF (2016, 2019, 2023)
- Wimbledon: F (2014)
- US Open: F (2017, 2019)

Team competitions
- Fed Cup: 14–6
Medal record
Women's tennis
Representing Chinese Taipei
Asian Games
Gold medal – first place	2014 Incheon	Team
Gold medal – first place	2022 Hangzhou	Doubles
Silver medal – second place	2014 Incheon	Mixed doubles
Silver medal – second place	2018 Jakarta-Palembang	Doubles
Silver medal – second place	2026 Aichi-Nagoya	Doubles
Bronze medal – third place	2014 Incheon	Doubles
Bronze medal – third place	2022 Hangzhou	Mixed doubles
Universiade
Gold medal – first place	2017 Taipei	Doubles
Gold medal – first place	2017 Taipei	Team
- Last updated on: 20 August 2026.

Chan Hao-ching (Chinese: 詹皓晴; pinyin: Zhān Hàoqíng; Taiwanese Mandarin: [tsán.xâu.tɕʰǐŋ]; born September 19, 1993), also known as Angel Chan, is a Taiwanese professional tennis player. She is primarily a doubles specialist, having won twenty-two WTA Tour, three WTA Challenger and six ITF titles in that discipline. Chan reached the final of the mixed-doubles competition at Wimbledon with Max Mirnyi in 2014, her first major final. She reached two more finals in 2017, the Wimbledon women's doubles with Monica Niculescu, and the US Open mixed doubles with Michael Venus.

== Personal life ==
She is the younger sister of fellow professional tennis player and former world No. 1 in women's doubles, Latisha Chan, formerly known as Chan Yung-jan.

== Career ==
=== 2013: Shenzhen Open doubles title ===
At the beginning of the season, Chan won the Shenzhen Open with her sister Chan Yung-jan, beating Irina Buryachok and Valeriya Solovyeva in straight sets. She reached the quarterfinals of the Indian Wells Open with Janette Husárová, falling to Ekaterina Makarova and Elena Vesnina. At the Portugal Open, she won her second title of the year with Kristina Mladenovic, defeating Darija Jurak and Katalin Marosi in straight sets. Chan reached the second round of the French Open with Darija Jurak. She then suffered first round losses at both Wimbledon and the US Open, and also reached the finals of the Southern California Open with Janette Husárová and the Pan Pacific Open with Liezel Huber. She finished 2013 ranked 26th.

=== 2014: Wimbledon mixed doubles final ===
At Wimbledon, Chan reached the final of the mixed doubles with Max Mirnyi to reach her first Grand Slam tournament final. They lost to Nenad Zimonjić and Samantha Stosur, also in straight sets.

=== 2015: First Premier-5 title and major quarterfinal ===
Early in the year, Chan won the title at the Thailand Open with her sister, defeating Shuko Aoyama and Tamarine Tanasugarn in three sets.

They won their fourth Tour doubles title together at the Cincinnati Open, and by doing so, had the second largest number of WTA Tour doubles titles for a pair of sisters in WTA history following only Serena and Venus Williams. Cincinnati represented their biggest title yet and their first at the Premier-5 level. Next, they won another title at the Japan Women's Open in Tokyo.

The Chans reached two other finals, at the Pan Pacific Open, losing to Garbiñe Muguruza and Carla Suárez Navarro, and the China Open, losing to the No. 1 pairing of Martina Hingis and Sania Mirza. Hao-ching and Yung-jan became the third all-sister pairing to qualify for the WTA Finals after Manuela Maleeva and Katerina Maleeva in 1986 and the Williams sisters in 2009. They reached the semifinals, losing again to Hingis and Mirza. It was Chan's first appearance at the tournament. She finished 2015 ranked 12th, her best year-end ranking so far.

=== 2017: Wimbledon and US Open doubles finals ===
Hao-ching became only the second Taiwanese woman, following 2013 champion Hsieh Su-wei, to reach the Wimbledon women's doubles final. Playing with Monica Niculescu, who was also making her first appearance in a Grand Slam tournament final, they were overwhelmed 6–0, 6–0 by the pair of Ekaterina Makarova and Elena Vesnina. It was only the second such result in a final in the history of the competition.

At the US Open, playing with New Zealander Michael Venus, she reached the mixed doubles final against top seeds Martina Hingis and Jamie Murray, losing in a deciding champions tiebreak.

=== 2023: Thailand Open doubles title ===
Chan won her 19th Tour title at the Thailand Open, partnering with Wu Fang-hsien.

=== 2024: 20th WTA Tour title ===
Chan won her 20th title at the Hobart International, partnering with Giuliana Olmos, defeating Guo Hanyu and Jiang Xinyu in the final.

Teaming with Veronika Kudermetova she was runner-up at the China Open in October, losing to Sara Errani and Jasmine Paolini in the final.

Chan and Kudermetova qualified for the WTA Finals and reached the semifinals, after compiling a record of two wins and one loss in the group stages. They lost to Kateřina Siniaková and Taylor Townsend in the last four.

== Equipment ==
The Chan sisters use Wilson racquets. They are also sponsored by Taiwan Mobile, EVA Air, and French apparel company Lacoste.

== Performance timelines ==
Key
W	F	SF	QF	#R	RR	Q#	P#	DNQ	A	Z#	PO	G	S	B	NMS	NTI	P	NH

(W) winner; (F) finalist; (SF) semifinalist; (QF) quarterfinalist; (#R) rounds 4, 3, 2, 1; (RR) round-robin stage; (Q#) qualification round; (P#) preliminary round; (DNQ) did not qualify; (A) absent; (Z#) Davis/Fed Cup Zonal Group (with number indication) or (PO) play-off; (G) gold, (S) silver or (B) bronze Olympic/Paralympic medal; (NMS) not a Masters tournament; (NTI) not a Tier I tournament; (P) postponed; (NH) not held; (SR) strike rate (events won / competed); (W–L) win–loss record.
To avoid confusion and double counting, these charts are updated at the conclusion of a tournament or when the player's participation has ended.

Only main-draw results in WTA Tour, Grand Slam tournaments, Fed Cup/Billie Jean King Cup and Olympic Games are included in win–loss records.

=== Doubles ===
Tournament	2012	2013	2014	2015	2016	2017	2018	2019	2020	2021	2022	2023	2024	2025	SR	W–L	Win%
Grand Slam tournaments
Australian Open	A	1R	3R	1R	QF	1R	3R	QF	SF	1R	A	QF	2R	3R	0 / 12	20–12	63%
French Open	3R	2R	2R	3R	QF	3R	SF	2R	A	3R	1R	QF	3R	2R	0 / 14	23–14	62%
Wimbledon	1R	1R	1R	3R	2R	F	2R	3R	NH	QF	QF	2R	3R	3R (Note: Withdrew during the tournament. Not counted as a loss.)	0 / 12	22–12	65%
US Open	1R	1R	2R	QF	2R	QF	2R	2R	A	1R	3R	2R	SF	1R	0 / 13	17–13	57%
Win–loss	2–3	1–4	4–4	7–4	8–4	10–4	8–4	6–4	4–1	5–4	5–3	3–1	9–4	5–3	0 / 55	87–54	62%
Year-end championships
WTA Finals	DNQ			SF	1R	DNQ		RR	NH	DNQ					0 / 3	2–6	25%
National representation
Summer Olympics	A	NH			QF	NH				1R	NH		1R	NH	0 / 3	2–3	40%
WTA 1000
Dubai / Qatar Open (Note: The first Premier 5 event of the year has switched back and forth between the Dubai Tennis Championships and the Qatar Ladies Open since 2009. Dubai was classified as a Premier 5 event from 2009 to 2011 before being succeeded by Doha for the 2012–2014 period. In 2015, Dubai regained its Premier 5 status while Doha was demoted to Premier status. The Premier 5 tournaments were reclassified as WTA 1000 tournaments in 2021.)	2R	A	2R	1R	W	SF	2R	SF	2R	A	1R	F	1R	1R	1 / 12	18–10	64%
Indian Wells Open	A	QF	1R	1R	2R	2R	2R	SF	NH	A	2R	1R	1R	2R	0 / 11	10–11	48%
Miami Open	A	1R	1R	2R	1R	2R	QF	SF	NH	A	1R	QF	1R	1R	0 / 11	9–11	45%
Madrid Open	A	2R	2R	A	QF	1R	2R	1R	NH	1R	2R	1R	2R	1R	0 / 11	5–11	31%
Italian Open	A	1R	1R	1R	A	1R	2R	SF	A	QF	QF	2R	2R	2R	0 / 11	9–11	45%
Canadian Open	QF	2R	SF	QF	2R	A	2R	2R	NH	A	1R	1R	A	QF	0 / 10	12–9	57%
Cincinnati Open	1R	QF	1R	W	SF	A	A	1R	A	1R	1R	SF	A	1R	1 / 10	11–9	55%
Pan Pacific / Wuhan Open (Note: In 2014, the Pan Pacific Open was downgraded to a Premier event and replaced by the Wuhan Open. The Premier 5 tournaments were reclassified as WTA 1000 tournaments in 2021.)	A	F	A	SF	SF	1R	1R	QF	NH				QF	QF	0 / 8	13–8	62%
China Open	A	2R	A	F	SF	2R	1R	2R	NH			F	F	1R	0 / 9	15–9	63%
Career statistics
Year-end ranking	50	26	27	12	12	17	25	15	15	32	40	21	16	40			

=== Mixed doubles ===
Tournament	2013	2014	2015	2016	2017	2018	2019	2020	2021	2022	2023	SR	W–L	Win%
Australian Open	A	1R	2R	1R	1R	2R	2R	2R	1R	A	1R	0 / 9	4–9	31%
French Open	A	1R	1R	QF	2R	1R	QF	NH	1R	2R	QF	0 / 9	8–9	47%
Wimbledon	1R	F	1R	2R	2R	3R	2R	NH	A	1R	1R	0 / 9	5–9	36%
US Open	QF	2R	A	2R	F	1R	F	NH	1R	A	1R	0 / 8	12–8	60%
Win–loss	2–2	5–4	1–3	3–4	5–4	2–4	7–4	1–1	0–3	1–2	2–4	0 / 35	29–35	45%

== Grand Slam tournaments ==
=== Doubles: 1 (runner-up) ===
Result	Year	Championship	Surface	Partner	Opponents	Score
Loss	2017	Wimbledon	Grass	(Romania) Monica Niculescu	(Russia) Ekaterina Makarova (Russia) Elena Vesnina	0–6, 0–6

=== Mixed doubles: 3 (runner-ups) ===
Result	Year	Championship	Surface	Partner	Opponents	Score
Loss	2014	Wimbledon	Grass	(Belarus) Max Mirnyi	(Serbia) Nenad Zimonjić (Australia) Samantha Stosur	4–6, 2–6
Loss	2017	US Open	Hard	(New Zealand) Michael Venus	(United Kingdom) Jamie Murray (Switzerland) Martina Hingis	1–6, 6–4, [8–10]
Loss	2019	US Open	Hard	(New Zealand) Michael Venus	(United Kingdom) Jamie Murray (United States) Bethanie Mattek-Sands	2–6, 3–6

== Other significant finals ==
=== WTA 1000 tournaments ===
==== Doubles: 6 (2 titles, 4 runner-ups) ====
Result	Year	Tournament	Surface	Partner	Opponents	Score
Loss	2013	Pan Pacific Open	Hard	(United States) Liezel Huber	(Zimbabwe) Cara Black (India) Sania Mirza	6–4, 0–6, [9–11]
Win	2015	Cincinnati Open	Hard	(Chinese Taipei) Chan Yung-jan	(Australia) Casey Dellacqua (Kazakhstan) Yaroslava Shvedova	7–5, 6–4
Loss	2015	China Open	Hard	(Chinese Taipei) Chan Yung-jan	(Switzerland) Martina Hingis (India) Sania Mirza	7–6^{(11–9)}, 1–6, [8–10]
Win	2016	Qatar Ladies Open	Hard	(Chinese Taipei) Chan Yung-jan	(Italy) Sara Errani (Spain) Carla Suárez Navarro	6–3, 6–3
Loss	2023	Dubai Championships	Hard	(Chinese Taipei) Latisha Chan	(Russia) Veronika Kudermetova (Russia) Liudmila Samsonova	4–6, 7–6^{(7–4)}, [1–10]
Loss	2023	China Open	Hard	(Mexico) Giuliana Olmos	(Czech Republic) Marie Bouzková (Spain) Sara Sorribes Tormo	6–3, 0–6, [4–10]
Loss	2024	China Open	Hard	(Russia) Veronika Kudermetova	(Italy) Sara Errani (Italy) Jasmine Paolini	4–6, 4–6

== WTA Tour finals ==
=== Doubles: 47 (24 titles, 23 runner-ups) ===
Legend Grand Slam (0–1) WTA 1000 (2–5) WTA 500 (6–11) WTA 250 (16–6)	Finals by surface Hard (19–15) Clay (3–2) Grass (2–6)

Result	W–L	Date	Tournament	Tier	Surface	Partner	Opponents	Score
Loss	0–1	Feb 2012	Pattaya Open, Thailand	International (Note: The WTA International tournaments were reclassified as WTA 250 tournaments in 2021.)	Hard	(Chinese Taipei) Chan Yung-jan	(India) Sania Mirza (Australia) Anastasia Rodionova	6–3, 1–6, [8–10]
Loss	0–2	Mar 2012	Malaysian Open, Malaysia	International	Hard (i)	(Japan) Rika Fujiwara	(Chinese Taipei) Chang Kai-chen (Chinese Taipei) Chuang Chia-jung	5–7, 4–6
Win	1–2	Jan 2013	Shenzhen Open, China	International	Hard	(Chinese Taipei) Chan Yung-jan	(Ukraine) Irina Buryachok (Russia) Valeriya Solovyeva	6–0, 7–5
Win	2–2	May 2013	Estoril Open, Portugal	International	Clay	(France) Kristina Mladenovic	(Croatia) Darija Jurak (Hungary) Katalin Marosi	7–6^{(7–3)}, 6–2
Loss	2–3	Aug 2013	Southern California Open, US	Premier (Note: The WTA Premier tournaments were reclassified as WTA 500 tournaments in 2021.)	Hard	(Slovakia) Janette Husárová	(United States) Raquel Kops-Jones (United States) Abigail Spears	4–6, 1–6
Loss	2–4	Sep 2013	Pan Pacific Open, Japan	Premier 5 (Note: The WTA Premier 5 & Mandatory tournaments were reclassified as WTA 1000 tournaments in 2021.)	Hard	(United States) Liezel Huber	(Zimbabwe) Cara Black (India) Sania Mirza	6–4, 0–6, [9–11]
Loss	2–5	Apr 2014	Charleston Open, US	Premier	Clay (green)	(Chinese Taipei) Chan Yung-jan	(Spain) Anabel Medina Garrigues (Kazakhstan) Yaroslava Shvedova	6–7^{(4–7)}, 2–6
Win	3–5	Apr 2014	Malaysian Open, Malaysia	International	Hard	(Hungary) Tímea Babos	(Chinese Taipei) Chan Yung-jan (China) Zheng Saisai	6–3, 6–4
Win	4–5	June 2014	Eastbourne International, UK	Premier	Grass	(Chinese Taipei) Chan Yung-jan	(Switzerland) Martina Hingis (Italy) Flavia Pennetta	6–3, 5–7, [10–7]
Win	5–5	Feb 2015	Pattaya Open, Thailand	International	Hard	(Chinese Taipei) Chan Yung-jan	(Japan) Shuko Aoyama (Thailand) Tamarine Tanasugarn	2–6, 6–4, [10–3]
Win	6–5	May 2015	Nuremberg Cup, Germany	International	Clay	(Spain) Anabel Medina Garrigues	(Spain) Lara Arruabarrena (Romania) Raluca Olaru	6–4, 7–6^{(7–5)}
Win	7–5	Aug 2015	Cincinnati Open, US	Premier 5	Hard	(Chinese Taipei) Chan Yung-jan	(Australia) Casey Dellacqua (Kazakhstan) Yaroslava Shvedova	7–5, 6–4
Win	8–5	Sep 2015	Japan Women's Open, Japan	International	Hard	(Chinese Taipei) Chan Yung-jan	(Japan) Kurumi Nara (Japan) Misaki Doi	6–1, 6–2
Loss	8–6	Sep 2015	Pan Pacific Open, Japan	Premier	Hard	(Chinese Taipei) Chan Yung-jan	(Spain) Garbiñe Muguruza (Spain) Carla Suárez Navarro	5–7, 1–6
Loss	8–7	Oct 2015	China Open, China	Premier M	Hard	(Chinese Taipei) Chan Yung-jan	(Switzerland) Martina Hingis (India) Sania Mirza	7–6^{(11–9)}, 1–6, [8–10]
Win	9–7	Feb 2016	Taiwan Open, Taiwan	International	Hard	(Chinese Taipei) Chan Yung-jan	(Japan) Eri Hozumi (Japan) Miyu Kato	6–4, 6–3
Win	10–7	Feb 2016	Qatar Ladies Open, Qatar	Premier 5	Hard	(Chinese Taipei) Chan Yung-jan	(Italy) Sara Errani (Spain) Carla Suárez Navarro	6–3, 6–3
Loss	10–8	Jun 2016	Eastbourne International, UK	Premier	Grass	(Chinese Taipei) Chan Yung-jan	(Croatia) Darija Jurak (Australia) Anastasia Rodionova	7–5, 6–7^{(4–7)}, [6–10]
Win	11–8	Oct 2016	Hong Kong Open, China SAR	International	Hard	(Chinese Taipei) Chan Yung-jan	(United Kingdom) Naomi Broady (United Kingdom) Heather Watson	6–3, 6–1
Win	12–8	Feb 2017	Taiwan Open, Taiwan (2)	International	Hard	(Chinese Taipei) Chan Yung-jan	(Czech Republic) Lucie Hradecká (Czech Republic) Kateřina Siniaková	6–4, 6–2
Loss	12–9	May 2017	Internationaux de Strasbourg, France	International	Clay	(Chinese Taipei) Chan Yung-jan	(Australia) Ashleigh Barty (Australia) Casey Dellacqua	4–6, 2–6
Loss	12–10	Jun 2017	Birmingham Classic, UK	Premier	Grass	(China) Zhang Shuai	(Australia) Ashleigh Barty (Australia) Casey Dellacqua	1–6, 6–2, [8–10]
Loss	12–11	Jul 2017	Wimbledon, UK	Grand Slam	Grass	(Romania) Monica Niculescu	(Russia) Ekaterina Makarova (Russia) Elena Vesnina	0–6, 0–6
Win	13–11	Oct 2017	Hong Kong Open, China (2)	International	Hard	(Chinese Taipei) Chan Yung-jan	(China) Lu Jiajing (China) Wang Qiang	6–1, 6–1
Win	14–11	Feb 2018	Dubai Championships, UAE	Premier	Hard	(China) Yang Zhaoxuan	(Chinese Taipei) Hsieh Su-wei (China) Peng Shuai	4–6, 6–2, [10–6]
Loss	14–12	Jan 2019	Brisbane International, Australia	Premier	Hard	(Chinese Taipei) Latisha Chan	(United States) Nicole Melichar (Czech Republic) Květa Peschke	1–6, 1–6
Win	15–12	Jan 2019	Hobart International, Australia	International	Hard	(Chinese Taipei) Latisha Chan	(Belgium) Kirsten Flipkens (Sweden) Johanna Larsson	6–3, 3–6, [10–6]
Win	16–12	Feb 2019	Qatar Ladies Open, Qatar (2)	Premier	Hard	(Chinese Taipei) Latisha Chan	(Germany) Anna-Lena Grönefeld (Netherlands) Demi Schuurs	6–1, 3–6, [10–6]
Win	17–12	Jun 2019	Eastbourne International, UK (2)	Premier	Grass	(Chinese Taipei) Latisha Chan	(Belgium) Kirsten Flipkens (United States) Bethanie Mattek-Sands	2–6, 6–3, [10–6]
Win	18–12	Sep 2019	Pan Pacific Open, Japan	Premier	Hard	(Chinese Taipei) Latisha Chan	(Chinese Taipei) Hsieh Su-wei (Chinese Taipei) Hsieh Yu-chieh	7–5, 7–5
Loss	18–13	Feb 2021	Gippsland Trophy, Australia	WTA 500	Hard	(Chinese Taipei) Latisha Chan	(Czech Republic) Barbora Krejčíková (Czech Republic) Kateřina Siniaková	3–6, 6–7^{(4–7)}
Loss	18–14	Aug 2022	Silicon Valley Classic, US	WTA 500	Hard	(Japan) Shuko Aoyama	(China) Xu Yifan (China) Yang Zhaoxuan	5–7, 0–6
Win	19–14	Feb 2023	Hua Hin Championships, Thailand	WTA 250	Hard	(Chinese Taipei) Wu Fang-hsien	(China) Wang Xinyu (China) Zhu Lin	6–1, 7–6^{(8–6)}
Loss	19–15	Feb 2023	Abu Dhabi Open, UAE	WTA 500	Hard	(Japan) Shuko Aoyama	(Brazil) Luisa Stefani (China) Zhang Shuai	6–3, 2–6, [8–10]
Loss	19–16	Feb 2023	Dubai Championships, UAE	WTA 1000	Hard	(Chinese Taipei) Latisha Chan	(Russia) Veronika Kudermetova; Liudmila Samsonova	4–6, 7–6^{(7–4)}, [1–10]
Loss	19–17	Oct 2023	China Open, China	WTA 1000	Hard	(Mexico) Giuliana Olmos	(Spain) Sara Sorribes Tormo (Czech Republic) Marie Bouzková	6–3, 0–6, [4–10]
Win	20–17	Jan 2024	Hobart International, Australia (2)	WTA 250	Hard	(Mexico) Giuliana Olmos	(China) Guo Hanyu (China) Jiang Xinyu	6–3, 6–3
Win	21–17	Apr 2024	Stuttgart Grand Prix, Germany	WTA 500	Clay (i)	(Russia) Veronika Kudermetova	(Norway) Ulrikke Eikeri (Estonia) Ingrid Neel	4–6, 6–3, [10–2]
Loss	21–18	Jun 2024	Berlin Ladies Open, Germany	WTA 500	Grass	(Russia) Veronika Kudermetova	(China) Wang Xinyu (China) Zheng Saisai	2–6, 5–7
Loss	21–19	Jun 2024	Bad Homburg Open, Germany	WTA 500	Grass	(Russia) Veronika Kudermetova	(United States) Nicole Melichar-Martinez (Australia) Ellen Perez	6–4, 3–6, [8–10]
Loss	21–20	Oct 2024	China Open, China	WTA 1000	Hard	Veronika Kudermetova	(Italy) Sara Errani (Italy) Jasmine Paolini	4–6, 4–6
Loss	21–21	Aug 2025	Tennis in Cleveland, US	WTA 250	Hard	(China) Jiang Xinyu	(Kazakhstan) Anna Danilina (Serbia) Aleksandra Krunić	6–7^{(3–7)}, 4–6
Loss	21–22	Jun 2026	Nottingham Open, UK	WTA 250	Grass	(Japan) Shuko Aoyama	(United Kingdom) Harriet Dart (United Kingdom) Maia Lumsden	3–6, 4–6
Win	22–22	Jul 2026	Athens Open, Greece	WTA 250	Hard	(Japan) Miyu Kato	(United Kingdom) Maia Lumsden (China) Tang Qianhui	7–6^{(7–3)}, 4–6, [10–7]
Loss	22–23	Jul 2026	Memphis Classic, US	WTA 250	Hard	(Australia) Maya Joint	Maria Kozyreva (United Kingdom) Maia Lumsden	6–7^{(6–8)}, 3–6
Win	23–23	Sep 2026	Korea Open, Korea	WTA 250	Hard	(Chinese Taipei) Wu Fang-hsien	(Chinese Taipei) Lee Ya-hsin (China) Ye Qiuyu	6–2, 6–3
Win	24–23	Nov 2026	Hong Kong Open, China (3)	WTA 250	Hard	(Japan) Miyu Kato	(Australia) Talia Gibson (Australia) Maddison Inglis	6–4, 6–4

== WTA 125 finals ==
=== Doubles: 4 (3 titles, 1 runner-up) ===
Result	W–L	Date	Tournament	Surface	Partner	Opponents	Score
Win	1–0	Nov 2012	Taipei Challenger, Taiwan	Carpet (i)	(France) Kristina Mladenovic	(Chinese Taipei) Chang Kai-chen (Belarus) Olga Govortsova	5–7, 6–2, [10–8]
Win	2–0	Nov 2014	Taipei Challenger, Taiwan(2)	Carpet (i)	(Chinese Taipei) Chan Yung-jan	(Chinese Taipei) Chang Kai-chen (Chinese Taipei) Chuang Chia-jung	6–4, 6–3
Win	3–0	Mar 2026	Austin Challenger, United States	Hard	(Japan) Miyu Kato	(Netherlands) Isabelle Haverlag (United States) Sabrina Santamaria	6–2, 6–3
Loss	3–1	May 2026	Open de Saint-Malo, France	Clay	(United States) Ivana Corley	(Netherlands) Isabelle Haverlag (United Kingdom) Maia Lumsden	4–6, 0–6

== ITF Circuit finals ==
=== Doubles: 9 (6 titles, 3 runner-ups) ===
Legend
$50,000 tournaments (4–0)
$25,000 tournaments (2–1)
$10,000 tournaments (0–2)

Result	W–L	Date	Tournament	Tier	Surface	Partner	Opponents	Score
Win	1–0	Nov 2007	ITF Taoyuan, Taiwan	50,000	Hard	(Chinese Taipei) Chan Yung-jan	(Chinese Taipei) Hsieh Shu-ying (Chinese Taipei) Hsieh Su-wei	6–1, 2–6, [14–12]
Loss	1–1	Aug 2010	ITF Balikpapan, Indonesia	25,000	Hard	(Chinese Taipei) Kao Shao-yuan	(Indonesia) Ayu-Fani Damayanti (Indonesia) Lavinia Tananta	6–4, 7–5
Loss	1–2	Oct 2010	ITF Jakarta, Indonesia	10,000	Hard	(China) He Sirui	(Indonesia) Sandy Gumulya (Japan) Moe Kawatoko	7–6^{(3)}, 7–5
Win	2–2	May 2011	Kangaroo Cup, Japan	50,000	Hard	(Chinese Taipei) Chan Yung-jan	(Thailand) Noppawan Lertcheewakarn (Japan) Erika Sema	6–2, 6–3
Win	3–2	May 2011	ITF Changwon, South Korea	25,000	Hard	(China) Zheng Saisai	(Japan) Yurika Sema (Japan) Erika Takao	6–2, 4–6, [11–9]
Win	4–2	Jun 2011	ITF Gimcheon, South Korea	25,000	Hard	(Japan) Remi Tezuka	(South Korea) Kim Ji-young (South Korea) Yoo Mi	7–5, 6–4
Win	5–2	Aug 2011	Beijing Challenger, China	50,000	Hard	(Chinese Taipei) Chan Yung-jan	(Ukraine) Tetiana Luzhanska (China) Zheng Saisai	6–2, 6–3
Loss	5–3	Aug 2011	ITF Taipei, Taiwan	10,000	Hard	(Chinese Taipei) Chen Yi	(Chinese Taipei) Kao Shao-yuan (Thailand) Peangtarn Plipuech	6–3, 6–4
Win	6–3	Jan 2012	Blossom Cup, China	50,000	Hard	(Japan) Rika Fujiwara	(Japan) Kimiko Date-Krumm (China) Zhang Shuai	4–6, 6–4, [10–7]
