= Zhu Lin (tennis) =

Chinese tennis player (born 1994)

Zhu Lin 朱琳
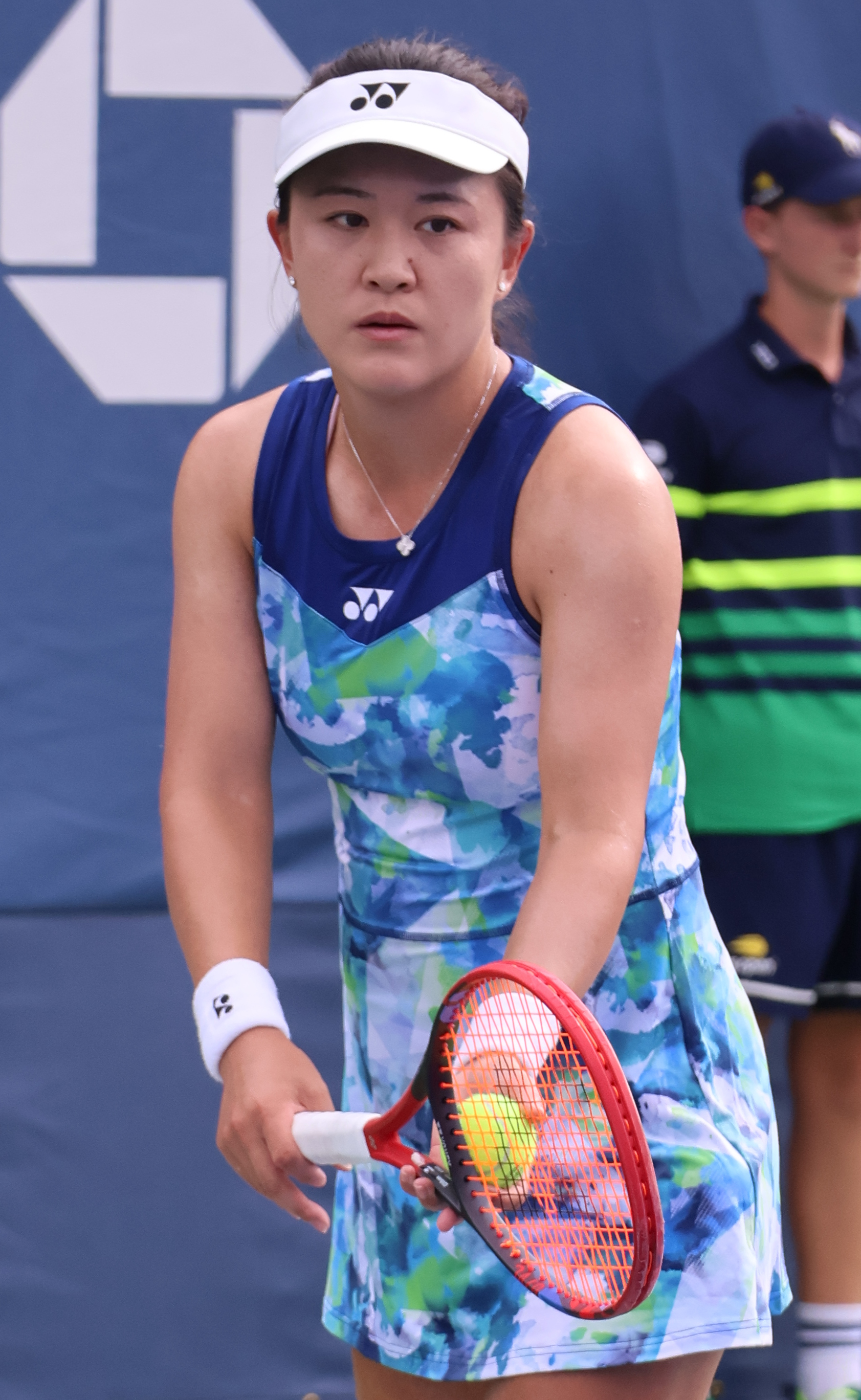
- Zhu at the 2023 US Open
- Country (sports): China
- Residence: Beijing, China
- Born: 28 January 1994 (age 32) Wuxi, China
- Height: 1.73 m (5 ft 8 in)
- Turned pro: 2012
- Plays: Right-handed (two-handed backhand)
- Prize money: $4,273,204

Singles
- Career record: 448–322
- Career titles: 1
- Highest ranking: No. 31 (18 September 2023)
- Current ranking: No. 265 (16 November 2026)

Grand Slam singles results
- Australian Open: 4R (2023)
- French Open: 1R (2019, 2021, 2022, 2023, 2024)
- Wimbledon: 3R (2024)
- US Open: 3R (2023)

Doubles
- Career record: 142–164
- Career titles: 1
- Highest ranking: No. 80 (2 October 2023)

Grand Slam doubles results
- Australian Open: 3R (2024)
- French Open: 2R (2022)
- Wimbledon: 3R (2023)
- US Open: 2R (2023)

Team competitions
- Fed Cup: 11–5
Medal record
Women's tennis
Representing China
Asian Games
Silver medal – second place	2022 Hangzhou	Singles
- Last updated on: 16 November 2026.

Zhu Lin (Chinese: 朱琳; pinyin: Zhū Lín; Mandarin pronunciation: [ʈʂú lǐn]; born 28 January 1994) is a Chinese tennis player. On 18 September 2023, Zhu reached a career-high singles ranking of world No. 31. She attained her best WTA doubles ranking of No. 80 on 2 October 2023. Zhu has won the 2023 Thailand Open in singles and the 2019 Jiangxi Open in doubles. She has also won one singles and one doubles title in WTA 125 tournaments, as well as 15 singles and six doubles titles on the ITF World Tennis Tour.

Playing for China Fed Cup team, Zhu has a win–loss record of 11–5 as of May 2026.

== Early life and background ==
Zhu Lin was born on 28 January 1994 to Zhu Jiangming and Chen Yunqi in Wuxi, China. Her father introduced her to tennis at age four. She has a very aggressive style of play, and her signature shot and also favorite shot is forehand. Her tennis idol growing up was Martina Hingis.

== Juniors ==
Zhu debuted on the ITF Junior Circuit in September 2009 at the age of 15 at the China Junior 1 Open, where she also reached her first singles final. She lost that match against Turkish player Melis Sezer, in straight sets. The following week, she played at China Junior 2 Open, where she also had success, reaching the semifinals in both singles and doubles. She continued having success in her next tournament, where she won the title in singles and reached semifinals in doubles in the 2009 Widjojo Soejono Semen Gresik Junior Championships. The next week, Zhu won her first doubles title and also reached the semifinal in singles at the Solo Open International Junior Championships. Toward the end of the year, she reached one singles final at the PHINMA International Juniors (week 2), where she lost, but won two doubles titles, at that tournament.

In January 2010, Zhu debuted at a junior Grand Slam tournament, playing at the Australian Open, where she was stopped in the third round by Kristýna Plíšková. In April 2010, she reached the quarterfinals at the Dunlop Japan Open Junior Championships, in both singles and doubles. At the end of May 2010, she played at the Asian Closed Junior Tennis Championships in New Delhi, India. There, she reached the semifinal in singles and the final in doubles. In September 2010, she lost in the first round of the junior US Open, in singles. Toward the end of the year, she won China Junior 2 Xiamen in singles.

In January 2011, she played at the Australian Open, where she lost in the second round, in both singles and doubles. It was her last junior doubles tournament. Her last junior singles tournament was at the China Junior 10 Dalian, where she lost in the third round. Her highest junior combined ranking was 39, that she reached on 17 January 2011.

== Professional ==
=== 2009–13: Playing on the ITF Circuit ===
Zhu made her debut on the ITF Circuit in June 2009, at Qianshan, China, where she was stopped in the second round. In October 2010, she played her first final, at Nonthaburi, Thailand, but lost to Nungnadda Wannasuk. Later, on 24 October, she won her first ITF Circuit singles title, at Khon Kaen, Thailand. In November 2010, she won her first doubles title, at Manila, Philippines. In 2011, Zhu won one singles title, at Jakarta, Indonesia. In 2012, she reached only one final in singles, at Pattaya, Thailand which she lost. In 2013, she debuted at the WTA 125 tournaments, when she lost at the Suzhou Ladies Open in the first round in both category.

=== 2014: WTA Tour debut ===
Zhu started the year in Antalya, Turkey, where she reached the final and lost to Lenka Wienerová. In March, she won a $10k event in Ankara defeating Iryna Shymanovich. In June, she won three consecutive tournaments: her first 25k level tournament in Belikpapan, Indonesia, then the 10k events in Tarakan and the following week in Solo, both Indonesia. She also reached her first significant final at the Xi'an Open, but lost to Duan Yingying. In August, she played her first Grand Slam qualifying; after defeating Giulia Gatto-Monticone and Arina Rodionova, she lost in the third round to Zheng Saisai. Zhu made her WTA Tour debut at the Hong Kong Open. Having entered the qualifying tournament, she defeated Wang Yafan, Raluca Olaru, and Elitsa Kostova for a spot in the main draw, where she subsequently recorded her first ever main-draw win on tour level by defeating Kristýna Plíšková in the first round, but was stopped in the second by Jana Čepelová. In September, Zhu played at the Premier-5 level Wuhan Open but failed to qualify. Next week, she played her first Premier Mandatory tournament, in the main draw of the China Open where she defeated Anastasia Pavlyuchenkova in the first round, but lost to Simona Halep in the second.

=== 2015: Major debut ===
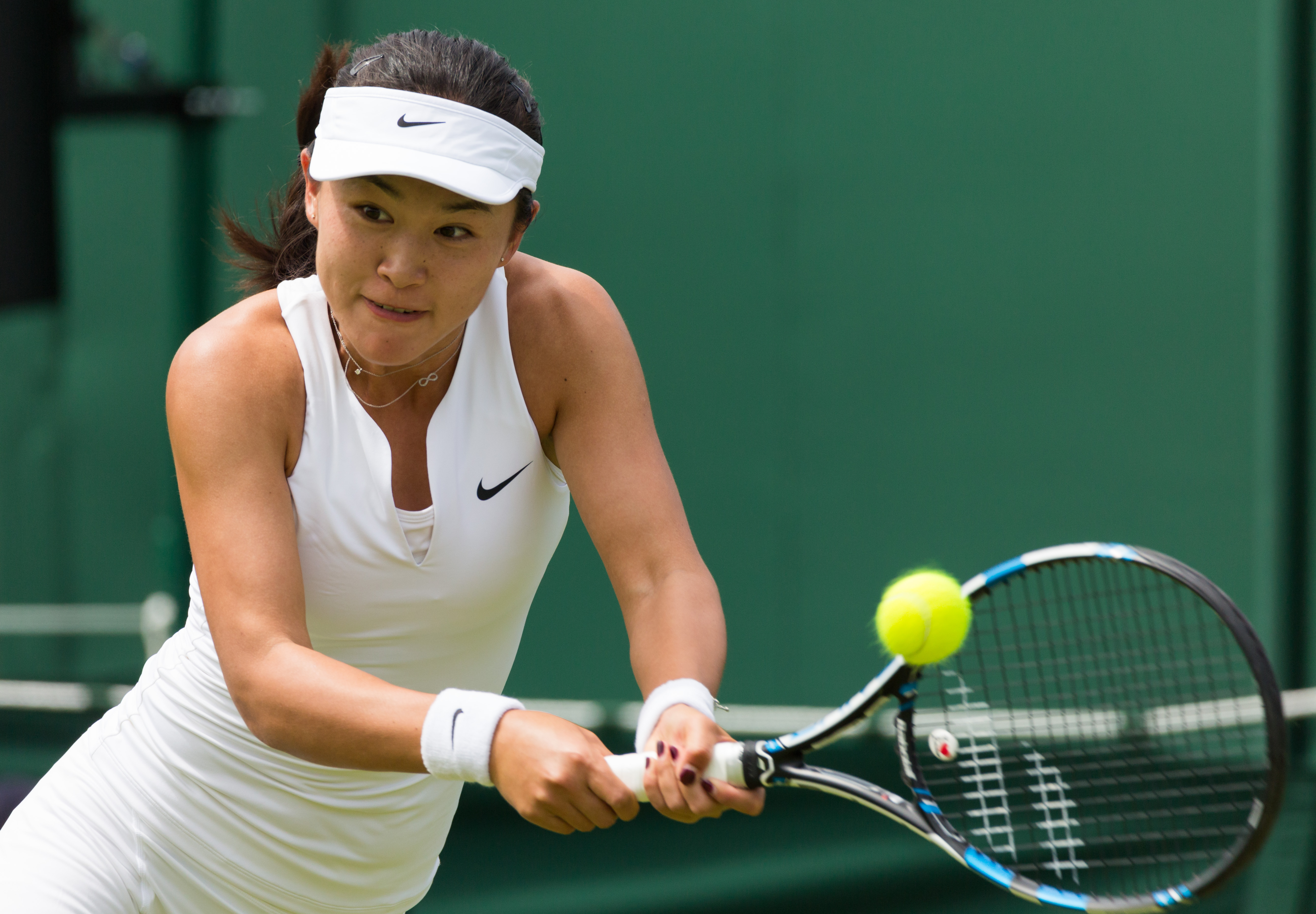
Zhu at the 2015 Wimbledon Championships

In January, Zhu failed to qualify for the Australian Open. At the Indian Wells Open, she reached the second round by defeating Francesca Schiavone after a controversial call from the umpire, but then lost to Sara Errani.

She failed to qualify for the Miami Open, Madrid Open and French Open. Zhu made her major singles debut at Wimbledon, where she lost to Belarusian qualifier Aliaksandra Sasnovich in three sets. At the US Open, she lost in the first round of qualifying.

=== 2016: Success in doubles on the ITF Circuit ===
She won the title at the Launceston International, her first tournament in the year where she played doubles. In April at the 25k event in Kashiwa, Japan, she reached the final in doubles. In late July, she won the Lexington Challenger, partnering with Hiroko Kuwata. At the Wuhan Open, she failed to qualify in singles, but reached the second round in doubles together with Han Xinyun, they lost to Bethanie Mattek-Sands and Lucie Šafářová. At the China Open, she also failed to qualify in singles, and in doubles, she was eliminated in the first round. In November, she reached her first $100k final in doubles at the Shenzhen Open, but lost with Han Xinyun against You Xiaodi and Nina Stojanović.

=== 2019–20: First major win & career doubles title, top 100 debut ===
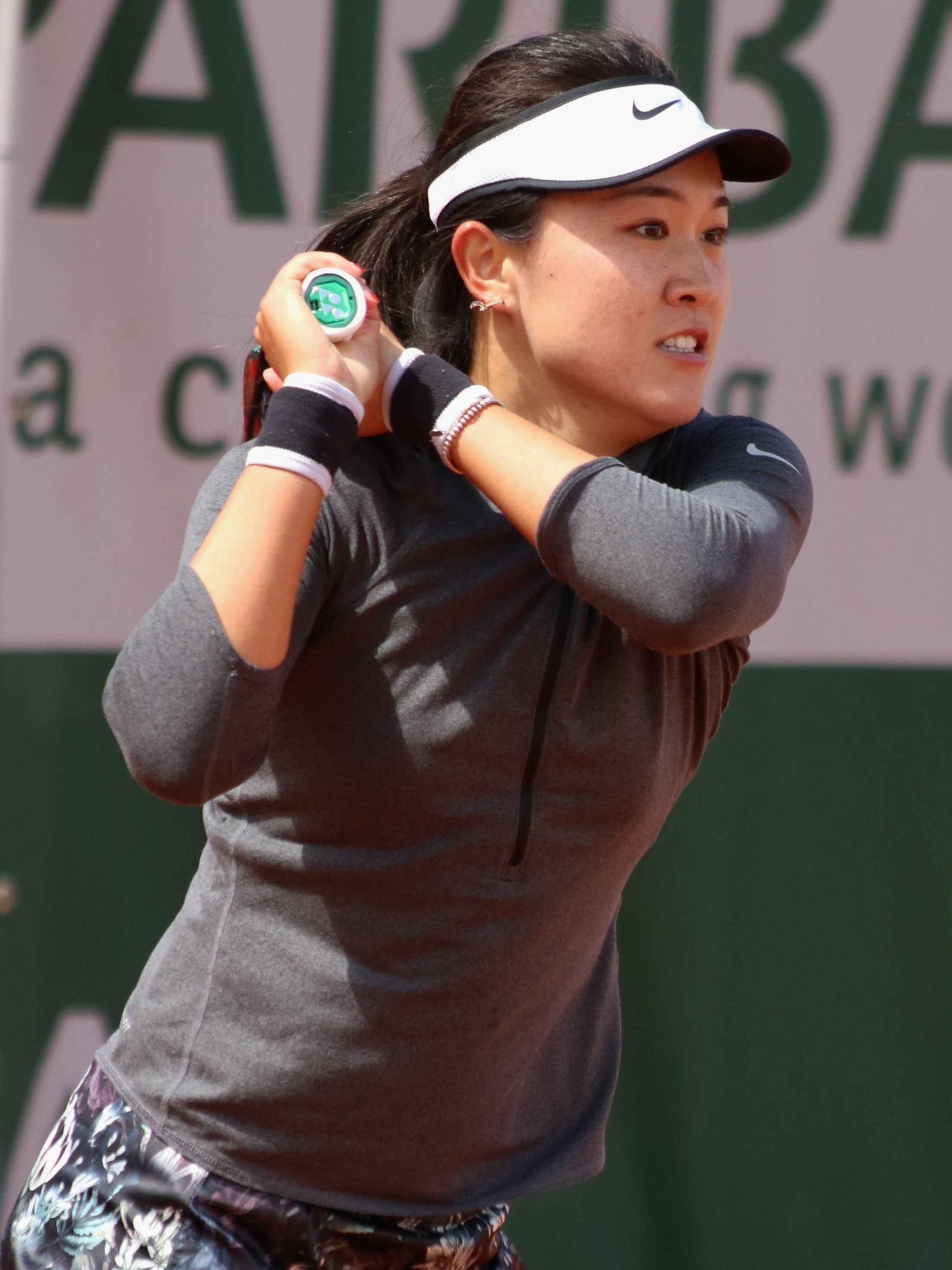
Zhu at the 2019 French Open

At the Dubai Championships, Zhu made one of her biggest wins, defeating reigning Doha champion Elise Mertens, but lost in the second round to Lesia Tsurenko. On 25 February 2019, she entered the top 100 in singles, reaching world No. 93.

After losing six first-round matches, Zhu clinched her first singles victory at a Grand Slam tournament at the US Open, beating compatriot teenager Wang Xinyu in straight sets, before she lost to Madison Keys in the second round.

In September, she played her first WTA Tour final, at the 2019 Jiangxi International Open, where she and Wang Xinyu defeated Peng Shuai and Zhang Shuai in an all-Chinese final.

=== 2021: First WTA Challenger singles title ===
In December, she won her first singles title on the WTA Challenger Tour in Seoul, defeating Kristina Mladenovic in the final.

=== 2022: WTA 1000 and top 60 debuts ===
At the Guadalajara Open, she defeated Alizé Cornet in the first round. She followed up this win with a loss against Daria Kasatkina in the second round. Two weeks later, she reached her then career-high singles ranking of 58.

=== 2023: Major fourth round, first top-10 win & WTA Tour title, singles top 50 & doubles top 100 ===
The start of the season was promising for Zhu. In the opening week, she reached the quarterfinal at the Auckland Open after defeating Venus Williams. Her journey continued at the Australian Open where she reached the fourth round of a Grand Slam championship for the first time in her career, and also defeated two seeds on the way, 32nd seed Jil Teichmann and sixth seed Maria Sakkari, her first top-10 win. She lost a tight three-set match to Victoria Azarenka in the fourth round.

In Hua Hin, Thailand, she defeated seventh seed Wang Xinyu in the semifinals with whom she reached the doubles final at the same tournament. She won her first WTA Tour singles title defeating Ukrainian Lesia Tsurenko in the final. As a result, she reached new career-high rankings of No. 41 in singles and No. 90 in doubles, on 6 February 2023.

In doubles, she reached the third round at the 2023 Wimbledon Championships, partnering with Taiwanese player Wu Fang-hsien.

After reaching for the first time the third round at the US Open and following that finishing as runner-up at the Japan Women's Open in Osaka, she achieved a career-high of No. 31 in singles and No. 82 in doubles, on 18 September 2023.

=== 2024–25: WTA 1000 fourth round ===
She also reached the third round in doubles at the 2024 Australian Open, again partnering Wu Fang-hsien.

Zhu reached the final at the Thailand Open as the defending champion, but lost to Diana Shnaider. En route to the final, she defeated Taylah Preston, Linda Fruhvirtová, Arina Rodionova, and Wang Yafan, all without dropping a set.

Ranked No. 493 at the 2025 Canadian Open, Zhu reached the fourth round of a WTA 1000 event for the first time in her career by defeating Suzan Lamens.

== Performance timelines ==
Key
W	F	SF	QF	#R	RR	Q#	P#	DNQ	A	Z#	PO	G	S	B	NMS	NTI	P	NH

(W) winner; (F) finalist; (SF) semifinalist; (QF) quarterfinalist; (#R) rounds 4, 3, 2, 1; (RR) round-robin stage; (Q#) qualification round; (P#) preliminary round; (DNQ) did not qualify; (A) absent; (Z#) Davis/Fed Cup Zonal Group (with number indication) or (PO) play-off; (G) gold, (S) silver or (B) bronze Olympic/Paralympic medal; (NMS) not a Masters tournament; (NTI) not a Tier I tournament; (P) postponed; (NH) not held; (SR) strike rate (events won / competed); (W–L) win–loss record.
To avoid confusion and double counting, these charts are updated at the conclusion of a tournament or when the player's participation has ended.

Only main-draw results in WTA Tour, Grand Slam tournaments, Billie Jean King Cup, United Cup, Hopman Cup and Olympic Games are included in win–loss records.

=== Singles ===
Current through the 2025 China Open.

Tournament	2014	2015	2016	2017	2018	2019	2020	2021	2022	2023	2024	2025	SR	W–L	Win %
Grand Slam tournaments
Australian Open	A	Q1	Q3	1R	1R	1R	2R	2R	Q1	4R	1R	Q1	0 / 7	5–7	42%
French Open	A	Q1	Q1	A	A	1R	A	1R	1R	1R	1R	A	0 / 5	0–5	0%
Wimbledon	A	1R	Q3	Q3	Q1	1R	NH	2R	1R	1R	3R	1R	0 / 7	3–7	30%
US Open	Q3	Q1	Q1	Q2	Q3	2R	A	A	Q2	3R	A	1R	0 / 3	3–3	50%
Win–Loss	0–0	0–1	0–0	0–1	0–1	1–4	1–1	2–3	0–2	5–4	2–3	0–2	0 / 22	11–22	33%
Year-end championships
WTA Elite Trophy	DNQ						NH			SF			0 / 1	1–2	33%
National representation
Billie Jean King Cup (Note: Formerly known as Fed Cup until 2020.)	A	A	A	Z1	Z1	A	A (Note: Edition is split into the two years due to COVID-19.)		PO		PO		0 / 0	9–4	69%
WTA 1000
Qatar Open (Note: The first Premier 5 event of the year has switched back and forth between the Dubai Tennis Championships and the Qatar Ladies Open since 2009. Dubai was classified as a Premier 5 event from 2009 to 2011 before being succeeded by Doha for the 2012–2014 period. In 2015, Dubai regained its Premier 5 status while Doha was demoted to Premier status. The Premier 5 tournaments were reclassified as WTA 1000 tournaments in 2021.)	A	NMS	A	NMS	A	NMS	A	NMS	A	NMS	2R	A	0 / 1	1–1	50%
Dubai	NMS	A	NMS	1R	NMS	2R	NMS	Q1	NMS	A	1R	A	0 / 3	1–3	25%
Indian Wells Open	A	2R	A	A	A	1R	NH	A	A	1R	1R	A	0 / 4	1–4	20%
Miami Open	A	Q2	A	A	A	Q1	NH	Q1	Q2	2R	2R	A	0 / 2	1–2	33%
Madrid Open	A	Q1	A	A	A	A	NH	A	A	1R	1R	A	0 / 2	0–2	0%
Italian Open	A	A	A	A	A	A	A	A	A	A	1R	A	0 / 1	0–1	0%
Canadian Open	A	A	A	A	A	A	NH	A	A	1R	A	4R	0 / 2	3–2	60%
Cincinnati Open	A	A	A	A	A	A	A	A	A	1R	A	1R	0 / 2	0–2	0%
Guadalajara Open	NH								2R	A	NMS	A	0 / 1	1–1	50%
Wuhan Open	Q1	A	Q1	Q1	A	1R	NH				A	1R	0 / 2	0–2	0%
China Open	2R	A	Q1	1R	Q1	Q1	NH			1R	A	2R	0 / 4	2–4	33%
Win–Loss	1–1	1–1	0–0	0–2	0–0	1–3	0–0	0–0	1–1	0–6	2–6	4–4	0 / 24	10–24	29%
Career statistics
	2014	2015	2016	2017	2018	2019	2020	2021	2022	2023	2024	2025	SR	W–L	Win %
Tournaments	4	6	5	8	6	13	5	7	11	24			Career total: 89		
Titles	0	0	0	0	0	0	0	0	0	1	0		Career total: 1		
Finals	0	0	0	0	0	0	0	0	0	2	1		Career total: 3		
Hard win–loss	3–4	4–5	5–5	9–9	5–8	5–10	4–5	3–5	6–7	24–19			1 / 74	68–77	47%
Clay win–loss	0–0	0–0	0–0	0–0	0–0	0–2	0–0	0–1	2–3	0–2			0 / 7	2–8	20%
Grass win–loss	0–0	0–1	0–0	0–0	0–0	0–1	0–0	1–1	0–2	4–3			0 / 8	5–8	38%
Overall win–loss	3–4	4–6	5–5	9–9	5–8	5–13	4–5	4–7	8–12	28–24			1 / 89	75–93	45%
Year-end ranking (Note: 2010: WTA ranking–642, 2011: WTA ranking–601, 2012: WTA ranking–567, 2013: WTA ranking–580)	139	173	140	104	114	83	91	140	62	36	122	166	$4,273,204		

=== Doubles ===
Current through the 2025 US Open.

Tournament	2014	2015	2016	2017	2018	2019	2020	2021	2022	2023	2024	2025	SR	W–L	Win %
Grand Slam tournaments
Australian Open	A	A	A	A	A	A	2R	2R	A	1R	3R	A	0 / 4	4–4	50%
French Open	A	A	A	A	A	A	A	A	2R	1R	1R	A	0 / 3	1–3	25%
Wimbledon	A	A	A	Q1	A	A	NH	1R	2R	3R	1R	1R	0 / 5	3–5	38%
US Open	A	A	A	A	A	A	A	A	1R	2R	A	1R	0 / 3	1-3	25%
Win–Loss	0–0	0–0	0–0	0–0	0–0	0–0	1–1	1–2	2–3	3–4	2–3	0–2	0 / 15	9–15	38%
Year-end championships
WTA Elite Trophy	DNQ					RR	NH				NH		0 / 1	1–1	50%
National representation
Billie Jean King Cup	A	A	A	Z1	Z1	A	A		PO		PO		0 / 0	2–1	67%
WTA 1000
Canadian Open	A	A	A	A	A	A	NH	A	A	1R	A	A	0 / 1	0–1	0%
Cincinnati Open	A	A	A	A	A	A	A	A	A	1R	A	A	0 / 1	0–1	0%
Wuhan Open	1R	A	2R	A	A	A	NH			A	A	A	0 / 2	1–2	33%
China Open	A	A	1R	A	A	A	NH			A	A	A	0 / 1	0–1	0%
Guadalajara Open	NH								2R	A	A	A	0 / 1	1–1	50%
Win–Loss	0–1	0–0	1–2	0–0	0–0	0–0	0–0	0–0	1–1	0–2			0 / 6	2–6	25%
Career statistics
	2014	2015	2016	2017	2018	2019	2020	2021	2022	2023	2024	2025	SR	W–L	Win %
Tournaments	3	5	7	4	2	4	4	5	7	10			Career total: 50		
Titles	0	0	0	0	0	1	0	0	0	0			Career total: 1		
Finals	0	0	0	0	0	1	0	0	1	1			Career total: 3		
Overall win–loss	0–3	4–5	4–7	1–4	1–2	7–3	1–4	1–5	9–7	8–10			1 / 51	36–50	42%
Year-end ranking (Note: 2010: WTA ranking-889, 2011: WTA ranking-696, 2012: WTA ranking-704, 2013: WTA ranking-955)	302	231	123	174	539	134	118	319	109	122	237	572			

== WTA Tour finals ==
=== Singles: 3 (1 title, 2 runner-ups) ===
Legend WTA 250 (1–2)	Finals by surface Hard (1–2)

Result	W–L	Date	Tournament	Tier	Surface	Opponent	Score
Win	1–0	Feb 2023	Hua Hin Championships, Thailand	WTA 250	Hard	(Ukraine) Lesia Tsurenko	6–4, 6–4
Loss	1–1	Sep 2023	Japan Women's Open, Japan	WTA 250	Hard	(United States) Ashlyn Krueger	3–6, 6–7^{(6–8)}
Loss	1–2	Feb 2024	Hua Hin Championships, Thailand	WTA 250	Hard	Diana Shnaider	3–6, 6–2, 1–6

=== Doubles: 3 (1 title, 2 runner-ups) ===
Legend WTA 250 (1–2)	Finals by surface Hard (1–2)

Result	W–L	Date	Tournament	Tier	Surface	Partner	Opponents	Score
Win	1–0	Sep 2019	Jiangxi International, China	International (Note: The WTA International tournaments were reclassified as WTA 250 tournaments in 2021.)	Hard	(China) Wang Xinyu	(China) Peng Shuai (China) Zhang Shuai	6–2, 7–6^{(7–5)}
Loss	1–1	Feb 2022	Abierto Zapopan, Mexico	WTA 250	Hard	(China) Wang Xinyu	(United States) Kaitlyn Christian (Belarus) Lidziya Marozava	5–7, 3–6
Loss	1–2	Feb 2023	Hua Hin Championships, Thailand	WTA 250	Hard	(China) Wang Xinyu	(Chinese Taipei) Chan Hao-ching (Chinese Taipei) Wu Fang-hsien	1–6, 6–7^{(6–8)}

== WTA 125 finals ==
=== Singles: 1 (title) ===
Result	W–L	Date	Tournament	Surface	Opponent	Score
Win	1–0	Dec 2021	Seoul Open, South Korea	Hard (i)	(France) Kristina Mladenovic	6–0, 6–4

=== Doubles: 2 (1 title, 1 runner-up) ===
Result	W–L	Date	Tournament	Surface	Partner	Opponents	Score
Win	1–0	Apr 2017	Zhengzhou Open, China	Hard	(China) Han Xinyun	(United States) Jacqueline Cako (Israel) Julia Glushko	7–5, 6–1
Loss	1–1	May 2024	Trophée Clarins, France	Clay	(Romania) Monica Niculescu	(United States) Asia Muhammad (Indonesia) Aldila Sutjiadi	6–7^{(3–7)}, 6–4, [9–11]

== ITF Circuit finals ==
=== Singles: 30 (15 titles, 15 runner-ups) ===
Legend $100,000 tournaments (2–1) $80,000 tournaments (0–1) $50/60,000 tournaments (5–5) $25/35,000 tournaments (3–5) $10,000 tournaments (5–3)	Finals by surface Hard (13–13) Clay (2–1)

Result	W–L	Date	Tournament	Tier	Surface	Opponent	Score
Loss	0–1	Oct 2010	ITF Nonthaburi, Thailand	10k	Hard	(Thailand) Nungnadda Wannasuk	4–6, 1–6
Win	1–1	Oct 2010	ITF Khon Kaen, Thailand	10k	Hard	(Thailand) Luksika Kumkhum	6–3, 6–2
Win	2–1	May 2011	ITF Jakarta, Indonesia	10k	Hard	(Mexico) Nadia Abdalá	7–6, 6–3
Loss	2–2	Jun 2012	ITF Pattaya, Thailand	10k	Hard	(Russia) Anna Tyulpa	4–6, 2–6
Loss	2–3	Feb 2014	ITF Antalya, Turkey	10k	Clay	(Slovakia) Lenka Wienerová	7–5, 4–6, 4–6
Win	3–3	Mar 2014	ITF Antalya, Turkey	10k	Clay	(Belarus) Iryna Shymanovich	6–1, 6–4
Loss	3–4	May 2014	ITF Tianjin, China	25k	Hard	(China) Wang Qiang	3–6, 2–6
Win	4–4	May 2014	ITF Balikpapan, Indonesia	25k	Clay	(India) Ankita Raina	7–5, 2–6, 6–3
Win	5–4	Jun 2014	ITF Tarakan, Indonesia	10k	Hard	(China) Wang Yan	4–6, 6–0, 6–2
Win	6–4	Jun 2014	ITF Solo, Indonesia	10k	Hard	(Indonesia) Lavinia Tananta	6–0, 6–0
Loss	6–5	Jun 2014	ITF Xi'an, China	50k	Hard	(China) Duan Yingying	6–4, 6–7, 4–6
Loss	6–6	Dec 2014	ITF Hong Kong, China SAR	50k	Hard	(China) Yang Zhaoxuan	6–4, 6–4
Loss	6–7	Apr 2016	Kōfu International, Japan	25k	Hard	(Sweden) Susanne Celik	6–7^{(3–7)}, 3–6
Loss	6–8	May 2017	Kangaroo Cup Gifu, Japan	80k	Hard	(Slovakia) Magdaléna Rybáriková	2–6, 3–6
Win	7–8	May 2017	Jin'an Open, China	60k	Hard	(India) Ankita Raina	6–3, 3–6, 6–4
Loss	7–9	Jul 2017	ITF Tianjin, China	25k	Hard	(China) Wang Yafan	4–6, 2–6
Win	8–9	May 2018	Jin'an Open, China (2)	60k	Hard	(China) Liu Fangzhou	6–0, 6–2
Win	9–9	Aug 2018	Jinan International, China	60k	Hard	(China) Wang Yafan	6–4, 6–1
Win	10–9	Jan 2019	ITF Singapore, Singapore	W25	Hard	(South Korea) Han Na-lae	6–2, 6–3
Loss	10–10	Aug 2019	Landisville Tennis Challenge, United States	W60	Hard	(United States) Madison Brengle	4–6, 5–7
Loss	10–11	Oct 2019	Suzhou Ladies Open, China	W100	Hard	(China) Peng Shuai	2–6, 6–3, 2–6
Win	11–11	Nov 2019	Liuzhou Open, China	W60	Hard	(Australia) Arina Rodionova	2–6, 6–0, 6–1
Win	12–11	Nov 2019	Shenzhen Longhua Open, China	W100	Hard	(China) Peng Shuai	6–3, 1–3 ret.
Loss	12–12	Jan 2020	ITF Hong Kong, China SAR	W25	Hard	(Kazakhstan) Zarina Diyas	4–6, 5–7
Win	13–12	Mar 2022	Guanajuato Open, Mexico	W60+H	Hard	(Canada) Rebecca Marino	6–4, 6–1
Win	14–12	Apr 2022	ITF Monastir, Tunisia	W25	Hard	(Canada) Victoria Mboko	6–1, 4–6, 6–4
Win	15–12	Aug 2022	Landisville Tennis Challenge, United States	W100	Hard	(United States) Elizabeth Mandlik	6–2, 6–3
Loss	15–13	May 2025	ITF Goyang, South Korea	W35	Hard	(Indonesia) Janice Tjen	4–6, 1–6
Loss	15–14	Sept 2025	ITF Guiyang, China	W50	Hard	(China) Guo Hanyu	3–6, 6–4, 1–6
Loss	15–15	Feb 2026	Queensland International, Australia	W75	Hard	(Australia) Emerson Jones	4–6, 5–7

=== Doubles: 10 (6 titles, 4 runner-ups) ===
Legend $100,000 tournaments (1–1) $75,000 tournaments (1–0) $50/60,000 tournaments (1–1) $25,000 tournaments (0–1) $10,000 tournaments (3–1)	Finals by surface Hard (5–4) Grass (1–0)

Result	W–L	Date	Tournament	Tier	Surface	Partner	Opponents	Score
Loss	0–1	Oct 2010	ITF Pattaya, Thailand	10k	Hard	(Chinese Taipei) Juan Ting-fei	(Chinese Taipei) Chen Yi (Thailand) Varatchaya Wongteanchai	5–7, 2–6
Win	1–1	Nov 2010	ITF Manila, Philippines	10k	Hard	(China) Yang Zhaoxuan	(South Korea) Kim Ji-young (South Korea) Kim Jin-hee	6–4, 6–7^{(5)}, [10–7]
Win	2–1	Feb 2014	ITF Antalya, Turkey	10k	Hard	(China) Li Yihong	(Romania) Gabriela Talabă (Romania) Patricia Maria Țig	6–2, ret.
Win	3–1	Feb 2014	ITF Antalya, Turkey	10k	Hard	(China) Li Yihong	(Romania) Nicoleta-Cătălina Dascălu (Romania) Raluca Șerban	3–6, 6–3, [10–3]
Win	4–1	Feb 2016	Launceston International, Australia	75k	Hard	(China) You Xiaodi	(Ukraine) Nadiia Kichenok (Luxembourg) Mandy Minella	2–6, 7–5, [10–7]
Loss	4–2	Apr 2016	ITF Kashiwa, Japan	25k	Hard	(China) You Xiaodi	(China) Yang Zhaoxuan (China) Zhang Kailin	5–7, 6–2, [9–11]
Win	5–2	Jul 2016	Lexington Challenger, US	50k	Hard	(Japan) Hiroko Kuwata	(United States) Sophie Chang (United States) Alexandra Mueller	6–0, 7–5
Loss	5–3	Nov 2016	Shenzhen Longhua Open, China	100k	Hard	(China) Han Xinyun	(Serbia) Nina Stojanović (China) You Xiaodi	4–6, 6–7^{(6)}
Loss	5–4	Apr 2017	Blossom Cup, China	60k	Hard	(Japan) Hiroko Kuwata	(China) Han Xinyun (China) Ye Qiuyu	3–6, 3–6
Win	6–4	Jun 2019	Manchester Trophy, UK	W100	Grass	(China) Duan Yingying	(United States) Robin Anderson (Romania) Laura Ioana Paar	6–4, 6–3

== Record against top 10 players ==
- Zhu has a 3–11 record against players who were, at the time the match was played, ranked in the top 10.

#	Opponent	Rank	Event	Surface	Round	Score	Rank	Source
2023
1.	(Greece) Maria Sakkari	6	Australian Open	Hard	3R	7–6^{(7–3)}, 1–6, 6–4	87	H2H
2.	(France) Caroline Garcia	7	Tennis in Cleveland, US	Hard	QF	6–4, 6–1	48	H2H
2025
3.	Mirra Andreeva	6	Ningbo Open, China	Hard	2R	4–6, 6–3, 6–2	219	

*As of 15 October 2025
