= Hua Hin Championships =

Women's tennis tournament in Thailand

Defunct tennis tournament
- Event name: Hua Hin Championships
- Founded: 2019
- Abolished: 2024
- Location: Hua Hin; Thailand
- Venue: True Arena Hua Hin
- Category: WTA 250
- Surface: Hard - outdoors
- Draw: 32S / 24Q / 16D
- Prize money: US$267,082 (2024)
- Website: Website

Current champions (2024)
- Singles: (Slovakia) Rebecca Šramková
- Doubles: (Kazakhstan) Anna Danilina / Irina Khromacheva

The Hua Hin Championships, also known as the WTA Thailand Open, was a WTA 250 tennis tournament on the WTA Tour played on outdoor hardcourts in Hua Hin, Thailand from 2019 until 2024.

== History ==
On debut in 2019, the event was sponsored by Toyota and was also known as the Toyota Thailand Open. Initially, the event was classified as a WTA International tournament, but has been a WTA 250 tournament as of the 2023 edition; the first to be played since the rebranding of WTA tournament categories in 2020. The tournament did not take place in 2021 and 2022 due to COVID-19 pandemic. It was replaced by the WTA Singapore Open in 2025.

A low-level men's and women's Challenger Tour event was previously held in the same location in 2015 and 2017 in November.

== Past finals ==
=== Singles ===
Year	Champion	Runner-up	Score
↓ International ↓
2019	(Ukraine) Dayana Yastremska	(Australia) Ajla Tomljanović	6–2, 2–6, 7–6^{(7–3)}
2020	(Poland) Magda Linette	(Switzerland) Leonie Küng	6–3, 6–2
2021–22	Not held		
↓ WTA 250 ↓
2023	(China) Zhu Lin	(Ukraine) Lesia Tsurenko	6–4, 6–4
2024^{(Feb)}	Diana Shnaider	(China) Zhu Lin	6–3, 2–6, 6–1
2024^{(Sep)}	(Slovakia) Rebecca Šramková	(Germany) Laura Siegemund	6–4, 6–4

=== Doubles ===
Year	Champions	Runners-up	Score
↓ International ↓
2019	(Romania) Irina-Camelia Begu (Romania) Monica Niculescu	(Russia) Anna Blinkova (China) Wang Yafan	2–6, 6–1, [12–10]
2020	(Australia) Arina Rodionova (Australia) Storm Sanders	(Austria) Barbara Haas (Australia) Ellen Perez	6–3, 6–3
2021–22	Not held		
↓ WTA 250 ↓
2023	(Chinese Taipei) Chan Hao-ching (Chinese Taipei) Wu Fang-hsien	(China) Wang Xinyu (China) Zhu Lin	6–1, 7–6^{(8–6)}
2024^{(Feb)}	(Japan) Miyu Kato (Indonesia) Aldila Sutjiadi	(China) Guo Hanyu (China) Jiang Xinyu	6–4, 1–6, [10–7]
2024^{(Sep)}	(Kazakhstan) Anna Danilina; Irina Khromacheva	(Hong Kong) Eudice Chong (Japan) Moyuka Uchijima	6–4, 7–5
