= 2023 Hong Kong Tennis Open – Singles =

Singles
- 2023 Hong Kong Tennis Open

Final
- Champion: (Canada) Leylah Fernandez
- Runner-up: (Czech Republic) Kateřina Siniaková
- Score: 3–6, 6–4, 6–4

Details
- Draw: 32
- Seeds: 8

Events
Singles	Doubles
← 2018 ·	Hong Kong Tennis Open	· 2024 →

Leylah Fernandez defeated Kateřina Siniaková in the final, 3–6, 6–4, 6–4 to win the singles tennis title at the 2023 Hong Kong Tennis Open.

Dayana Yastremska was the defending champion from when the tournament was last held in 2018, but lost to Mirra Andreeva in the first round.

== Seeds ==
1. Victoria Azarenka (first round, retired)
2. (Brazil) Beatriz Haddad Maia (second round)
3. (Belgium) Elise Mertens (quarterfinals)
4. (China) Wang Xinyu (second round)
5. Anna Blinkova (semifinals)
6. (Italy) Martina Trevisan (semifinals)
7. (United States) Peyton Stearns (first round)
8. (France) Varvara Gracheva (first round)

== Draw ==
=== Key ===
- Q = Qualifier
- WC = Wild card
- LL = Lucky loser
- Alt = Alternate
- ITF = ITF entry
- PR = Protected ranking
- SR = Special ranking
- SE = Special exempt
- JE = Junior exempt
- JR = Junior Accelerator Programme entrant
- CO = College Accelerator Programme entrant
- NG = Next Gen Accelerator Program entrant
- w/o = Walkover
- r = Retired
- d = Defaulted

=== Finals ===
Semifinals
(Canada) Leylah Fernandez	6	7
5	Anna Blinkova	2	5
6	(Italy) Martina Trevisan	4	2
(Czech Republic) Kateřina Siniaková	6	6

Final
(Canada) Leylah Fernandez	3	6	6
(Czech Republic) Kateřina Siniaková	6	4	4

=== Top half ===
First round
1	V Azarenka	6	3	0^{r}
(Canada) L Fernandez	2	6	0
M Andreeva	6	6
(Ukraine) D Yastremska	4	3
Q	A Korneeva	6	2	6
V Savinykh	4	6	3
(Czech Republic) L Fruhvirtová	3	6	6
7	(United States) P Stearns	6	4	4
4	(China) Xin Wang	6	4
E Avanesyan	2	1^{r}
WC	(Hong Kong) H-c Wu	1	0
(Spain) S Sorribes Tormo	6	6
(Australia) P Hon	7	7
WC	(Hong Kong) E Chong	5	5
(Kazakhstan) Y Putintseva	4	6	1^{r}
5	A Blinkova	6	2	5

Second round
(Canada) L Fernandez	3	6	6
M Andreeva	6	1	3
Q	A Korneeva	3	5
(Czech Republic) L Fruhvirtová	6	7
4	(China) Xin Wang	4	6	1
(Spain) S Sorribes Tormo	6	4	6
(Australia) P Hon	1	3
5	A Blinkova	6	6

Quarterfinals
(Canada) L Fernandez	7^{7}	6
(Czech Republic) L Fruhvirtová	6^{2}	2
(Spain) S Sorribes Tormo	6^{3}	3
5	A Blinkova	7^{7}	6

Semifinals
(Canada) L Fernandez	6	7
5	A Blinkova	2	5

=== Bottom half ===
First round
6	(Italy) M Trevisan	7	6
(Spain) C Bucșa	5	2
Q	(Kazakhstan) A Danilina	2	2
(Poland) M Fręch	6	6
Q	S Lansere	6	6
WC	(Hong Kong) C Wong	4	0
Q	(Australia) D Saville	1	4
3	(Belgium) E Mertens	6	6
8	(France) V Gracheva	3	2
K Rakhimova	6	6
(China) Xiy Wang	3	6^{7}
(Czech Republic) K Siniaková	6	7^{9}
A Pavlyuchenkova	6	6
(Croatia) J Fett	0	0
A Sasnovich	6^{3}	6	6^{3}
2	(Brazil) B Haddad Maia	7^{7}	3	7^{7}

Second round
6	(Italy) M Trevisan	6	6^{4}	6
(Poland) M Fręch	3	7^{7}	3
Q	S Lansere	3	6^{5}
3	(Belgium) E Mertens	6	7^{7}
K Rakhimova	7^{7}	3	1
(Czech Republic) K Siniaková	6^{3}	6	6
A Pavlyuchenkova	7	1	6
2	(Brazil) B Haddad Maia	5	6	1

Quarterfinals
6	(Italy) M Trevisan	6	6
3	(Belgium) E Mertens	4	3
(Czech Republic) K Siniaková	7^{7}	6
A Pavlyuchenkova	6^{1}	4

Semifinals
6	(Italy) M Trevisan	4	2
(Czech Republic) K Siniaková	6	6

== Qualifying ==
=== Seeds ===
1. Alina Korneeva (qualified)
2. (Chinese Taipei) Yang Ya-yi (qualifying competition)
3. (Slovenia) Dalila Jakupović (qualifying competition)
4. (India) Karman Thandi (first round)
5. (Australia) Daria Saville (qualified)
6. Sofya Lansere (qualified)
7. (Switzerland) Conny Perrin (qualifying competition)
8. Daria Lodikova (qualifying competition)

=== Qualifiers ===
1. Alina Korneeva
2. Sofya Lansere
3. (Australia) Daria Saville
4. (Kazakhstan) Anna Danilina

=== Qualifying draw ===
==== First qualifier ====
First round
1	Alina Korneeva	7	6
Amina Anshba	5	0
Ekaterina Yashina	1	0
7	(Switzerland) Conny Perrin	6	6

Qualifying competition
1	Alina Korneeva	6	6
7	(Switzerland) Conny Perrin	3	4

==== Second qualifier ====
First round
2	(Chinese Taipei) Yang Ya-yi	7	6
(United States) Dasha Ivanova	5	3
(Hong Kong) Ng Man-ying	1	2
6	Sofya Lansere	6	6

Qualifying competition
2	(Chinese Taipei) Yang Ya-yi	3	6	4
6	Sofya Lansere	6	4	6

==== Third qualifier ====
First round
3	(Slovenia) Dalila Jakupović	6	6
WC	(Hong Kong) Lai Ching-laam	0	3
(Chinese Taipei) Tsao Chia-yi	2	2
5	(Australia) Daria Saville	6	6

Qualifying competition
3	(Slovenia) Dalila Jakupović	6	5	3
5	(Australia) Daria Saville	4	7	6

==== Fourth qualifier ====
First round
4	(India) Karman Thandi	6^{2}	7^{7}	2
(Kazakhstan) Anna Danilina	7^{7}	6^{4}	6
WC	(Hong Kong) Che Sin-yu	1	2
8	Daria Lodikova	6	6

Qualifying competition
(Kazakhstan) Anna Danilina	6	6
8	Daria Lodikova	4	2
