= 2018 Hong Kong Tennis Open =

- Date: October 8–14
- Edition: 9th
- Category: WTA International
- Draw: 32S / 16D
- Prize money: $750,000
- Surface: Hard
- Location: Hong Kong
- Venue: Victoria Park Tennis Stadium

Champions

Singles
- (Ukraine) Dayana Yastremska

Doubles
- (Australia) Samantha Stosur / (China) Zhang Shuai
← 2017 ·	Hong Kong Tennis Open	· 2023 →

The 2018 Hong Kong Tennis Open (also known as the Prudential Hong Kong Tennis Open for sponsorship reasons) was a professional tennis tournament played on hard courts. It was the ninth edition of the tournament, and part of the 2018 WTA Tour. It took place in Victoria Park, Hong Kong, from October 8 to 14.

== Points and prize money ==
=== Point distribution ===
Event	W	F	SF	QF	Round of 16	Round of 32	Q	Q2	Q1
Singles	280	180	110	60	30	1	18	12	1
Doubles	280	180	110	60	1	—	—	—	—

=== Prize money ===
Event	W	F	SF	QF	Round of 16	Round of 32^{1}	Q2	Q1
Singles	$163,265	$81,251	$43,663	$13,068	$7,195	$4,444	$2,160	$1,270
Doubles *	$26,031	$13,544	$7,271	$3,852	$2,031	—	—	—

_{^{1} Qualifiers prize money is also the Round of 32 prize money}
_{* per team}

== Singles main-draw entrants ==
=== Seeds ===
Country	Player	Rank^{1}	Seed
UKR	Elina Svitolina	5	1
~~JPN~~	~~Naomi Osaka~~	~~8~~	~~2~~
LAT	Jeļena Ostapenko	13	3
ESP	Garbiñe Muguruza	15	4
~~UKR~~	~~Lesia Tsurenko~~	~~27~~	~~5~~
CHN	Wang Qiang	28	6
AUS	Daria Gavrilova	33	7
FRA	Alizé Cornet	39	8

- ^{1} Rankings are as of October 1, 2018

=== Other entrants ===
The following players received wildcards into the singles main draw:

- (Hong Kong) Eudice Chong
- (Australia) Priscilla Hon
- (Hong Kong) Zhang Ling

The following player received entry using a protected ranking into the singles main draw:

- (Slovakia) Kristína Kučová

The following players received entry from the qualifying draw:

- (Japan) Nao Hibino
- (Tunisia) Ons Jabeur
- (Netherlands) Lesley Kerkhove
- (Netherlands) Bibiane Schoofs
- (Uzbekistan) Sabina Sharipova
- (Hungary) Fanny Stollár

The following players received entry as lucky losers:

- (United States) Caroline Dolehide
- (Israel) Julia Glushko
- (Bulgaria) Viktoriya Tomova

=== Withdrawals ===
Before the tournament

- (Russia) Ekaterina Makarova → replaced by (United States) Caroline Dolehide
- (Japan) Naomi Osaka → replaced by (Israel) Julia Glushko
- (United States) Bernarda Pera → replaced by (Thailand) Luksika Kumkhum
- (Ukraine) Lesia Tsurenko → replaced by (Bulgaria) Viktoriya Tomova
- (United States) Sachia Vickery → replaced by (Slovakia) Kristína Kučová

== Doubles main-draw entrants ==
=== Seeds ===
Country	Player	Country	Player	Rank^{1}	Seed
TPE	Chan Hao-ching	CHN	Yang Zhaoxuan	55	1
POL	Alicja Rosolska	USA	Abigail Spears	64	2
JPN	Miyu Kato	JPN	Makoto Ninomiya	67	3
JPN	Shuko Aoyama	BLR	Lidziya Marozava	84	4

^{1} Rankings are as of October 1, 2018

=== Other entrants ===
The following pairs received wildcards into the doubles main draw:

- (Hong Kong) Eudice Chong / (Hong Kong) Zhang Ling
- (Hong Kong) Ng Kwan-yau / (Ukraine) Elina Svitolina

== Champions ==
=== Singles ===
- (Ukraine) Dayana Yastremska def. (China) Wang Qiang, 6–2, 6–1

=== Doubles ===
- (Australia) Samantha Stosur / (China) Zhang Shuai def. (Japan) Shuko Aoyama / (Belarus) Lidziya Marozava 6–4, 6–4
