= 2018 Hong Kong Tennis Open – Doubles =

Doubles
- 2018 Hong Kong Tennis Open

Final
- Champions: (Australia) Samantha Stosur (China) Zhang Shuai
- Runners-up: (Japan) Shuko Aoyama (Belarus) Lidziya Marozava
- Score: 6–4, 6–4

Details
- Draw: 16
- Seeds: 4

Events
Singles	Doubles
← 2017 ·	Hong Kong Tennis Open	· 2023 →

Chan Hao-ching and Latisha Chan were the defending champions, but Latisha could not participate due to a medical condition. Hao-ching played alongside Yang Zhaoxuan, but they lost in the first round to Nadiia Kichenok and Anastasia Rodionova.

Samantha Stosur and Zhang Shuai won the title, defeating Shuko Aoyama and Lidziya Marozava in the final, 6–4, 6–4.

== Seeds ==
1. (Chinese Taipei) Chan Hao-ching / (China) Yang Zhaoxuan (first round)
2. (Poland) Alicja Rosolska / (United States) Abigail Spears (quarterfinals)
3. (Japan) Miyu Kato / (Japan) Makoto Ninomiya (quarterfinals)
4. (Japan) Shuko Aoyama / (Belarus) Lidziya Marozava (final)

== Draw ==
=== Key ===
- Q = Qualifier
- WC = Wild card
- LL = Lucky loser
- Alt = Alternate
- SE = Special exempt
- PR = Protected ranking
- ITF = ITF entry
- JE = Junior exempt
- w/o = Walkover
- r = Retired
- d = Defaulted
- SR = Special ranking

=== Draw ===
First round
1	(Chinese Taipei) H-c Chan (China) Z Yang	4	3
(Ukraine) N Kichenok (Australia) An Rodionova	6	6
(Japan) N Hibino (Georgia (country)) O Kalashnikova	3	6	[7]
(Slovenia) D Jakupović (Czech Republic) R Voráčová	6	2	[10]
4	(Japan) S Aoyama (Belarus) L Marozava	4	6	[10]
(Serbia) A Krunić (Australia) Ar Rodionova	6	2	[8]
WC	(Hong Kong) E Chong (Hong Kong) L Zhang	1	2
(France) A Cornet (China) S Zheng	6	6
(Australia) P Hon (Hungary) F Stollár	4	4
(Australia) S Stosur (China) S Zhang	6	6
WC	(Hong Kong) K-y Ng (Ukraine) E Svitolina	1	3
3	(Japan) M Kato (Japan) M Ninomiya	6	6
(Chile) A Guarachi (Mexico) G Olmos	6	6
(Netherlands) L Kerkhove (Netherlands) B Schoofs	2	4
(United States) J Brady (Romania) M Niculescu	2	3
2	(Poland) A Rosolska (United States) A Spears	6	6

Quarterfinals
(Ukraine) N Kichenok (Australia) An Rodionova	7^{7}	6
(Slovenia) D Jakupović (Czech Republic) R Voráčová	6^{3}	1
4	(Japan) S Aoyama (Belarus) L Marozava	6	3	[10]
(France) A Cornet (China) S Zheng	3	6	[7]
(Australia) S Stosur (China) S Zhang	6	7^{7}
3	(Japan) M Kato (Japan) M Ninomiya	4	6^{5}
(Chile) A Guarachi (Mexico) G Olmos	3	6	[10]
2	(Poland) A Rosolska (United States) A Spears	6	3	[6]

Semifinals
(Ukraine) N Kichenok (Australia) An Rodionova	6	3	[7]
4	(Japan) S Aoyama (Belarus) L Marozava	4	6	[10]
(Australia) S Stosur (China) S Zhang	6	6
(Chile) A Guarachi (Mexico) G Olmos	4	1

Final
4	(Japan) S Aoyama (Belarus) L Marozava	4	4
(Australia) S Stosur (China) S Zhang	6	6
