= 2016 Hong Kong Tennis Open – Doubles =

Doubles
- 2016 Hong Kong Tennis Open

Final
- Champions: (Chinese Taipei) Chan Hao-ching (Chinese Taipei) Chan Yung-jan
- Runners-up: (United Kingdom) Naomi Broady (United Kingdom) Heather Watson
- Score: 6–3, 6–1

Events
Singles	Doubles
← 2015 ·	Hong Kong Tennis Open	· 2017 →

Alizé Cornet and Yaroslava Shvedova were the defending champions, but chose not to participate.

Chan Hao-ching and Chan Yung-jan won the title, defeating Naomi Broady and Heather Watson in the final, 6–3, 6–1.

== Seeds ==
1. (Chinese Taipei) Chan Hao-ching / (Chinese Taipei) Chan Yung-jan (champions)
2. (Slovenia) Andreja Klepač / (Slovenia) Katarina Srebotnik (quarterfinals)
3. (China) Liang Chen / (China) Yang Zhaoxuan (first round)
4. (Japan) Shuko Aoyama / (Japan) Makoto Ninomiya (semifinals)

== Draw ==
=== Key ===
- Q = Qualifier
- WC = Wild card
- LL = Lucky loser
- Alt = Alternate
- SE = Special exempt
- PR = Protected ranking
- ITF = ITF entry
- JE = Junior exempt
- w/o = Walkover
- r = Retired
- d = Defaulted
- SR = Special ranking

First round
1	(Chinese Taipei) H-c Chan (Chinese Taipei) Y-j Chan	6	3	[10]
(Chinese Taipei) C-w Chan (China) L Zhu	2	6	[2]
WC	(Hong Kong) K-y Ng (China) S Zheng	5	5
(New Zealand) M Erakovic (Hong Kong) L Zhang	7	7
4	(Japan) S Aoyama (Japan) M Ninomiya	7	7
(Thailand) N Lertpitaksinchai (Thailand) Pe Plipuech	5	5
(Ukraine) L Kichenok (Ukraine) N Kichenok	4	7	[9]
(Slovenia) D Jakupović (United Kingdom) T Moore	6	5	[11]
(United Kingdom) N Broady (United Kingdom) H Watson	4	6	[10]
(Chinese Taipei) Y-h Lee (Japan) K Takahata	6	3	[8]
(China) C Liu (China) J Lu	7	3	[10]
3	(China) C Liang (China) Z Yang	5	6	[7]
WC	(Hong Kong) E Chong (Hong Kong) K Ip	3	3
(Japan) N Hibino (Bulgaria) A Naydenova	6	6
(Turkey) B Eraydın (Russia) P Leykina	3	4
2	(Slovenia) A Klepač (Slovenia) K Srebotnik	6	6

Quarterfinals
1	(Chinese Taipei) H-c Chan (Chinese Taipei) Y-j Chan	6	6
(New Zealand) M Erakovic (Hong Kong) L Zhang	4	3
4	(Japan) S Aoyama (Japan) M Ninomiya	6	6
(Slovenia) D Jakupović (United Kingdom) T Moore	2	2
(United Kingdom) N Broady (United Kingdom) H Watson	6	7
(China) C Liu (China) J Lu	2	5
(Japan) N Hibino (Bulgaria) A Naydenova	6	6
2	(Slovenia) A Klepač (Slovenia) K Srebotnik	3	2

Semifinals
1	(Chinese Taipei) H-c Chan (Chinese Taipei) Y-j Chan	6	7^{9}
4	(Japan) S Aoyama (Japan) M Ninomiya	2	6^{7}
(United Kingdom) N Broady (United Kingdom) H Watson	6	6
(Japan) N Hibino (Bulgaria) A Naydenova	2	1

Final
1	(Chinese Taipei) H-c Chan (Chinese Taipei) Y-j Chan	6	6
(United Kingdom) N Broady (United Kingdom) H Watson	3	1
