= 2017 Hong Kong Tennis Open =

- Date: October 9–15
- Edition: 8th
- Category: WTA International
- Draw: 32S / 16D
- Prize money: $250,000
- Surface: Hard
- Location: Hong Kong
- Venue: Victoria Park Tennis Stadium

Champions

Singles
- (Russia) Anastasia Pavlyuchenkova

Doubles
- (Chinese Taipei) Chan Hao-ching / (Chinese Taipei) Chan Yung-jan
← 2016 ·	Hong Kong Tennis Open	· 2018 →

The 2017 Hong Kong Tennis Open (also known as the Prudential Hong Kong Tennis Open for sponsorship reasons) was a professional tennis tournament played on hard courts. It was the eighth edition of the tournament, and part of the 2017 WTA Tour. It took place in Victoria Park, Hong Kong, from October 9 to 15.

== Points and prize money ==
=== Point distribution ===
Event	W	F	SF	QF	Round of 16	Round of 32	Q	Q2	Q1
Singles	280	180	110	60	30	1	18	12	1
Doubles	280	180	110	60	1	—	—	—	—

=== Prize money ===
Event	W	F	SF	QF	Round of 16	Round of 32^{1}	Q2	Q1
Singles	$43,000	$21,400	$11,500	$6,175	$3,400	$2,100	$1,020	$600
Doubles *	$12,300	$6,400	$3,435	$1,820	$960	—	—	—

_{^{1} Qualifiers prize money is also the Round of 32 prize money}
_{* per team}

== Singles main-draw entrants ==
=== Seeds ===
Country	Player	Rank^{1}	Seed
UKR	Elina Svitolina	3	1
USA	Venus Williams	5	2
DEN	Caroline Wozniacki	6	3
POL	Agnieszka Radwańska	11	4
RUS	Elena Vesnina	20	5
RUS	Anastasia Pavlyuchenkova	21	6
AUS	Daria Gavrilova	22	7
CHN	Zhang Shuai	26	8

- ^{1} Rankings are as of October 2, 2017

=== Other entrants ===
The following players received wildcards into the singles main draw:

- (Chinese Taipei) Lee Ya-hsuan
- (Ukraine) Elina Svitolina
- (Russia) Elena Vesnina
- (Hong Kong) Zhang Ling

The following players received entry using a protected ranking into the main draw:

- (Japan) Misa Eguchi

The following players received entry from the qualifying draw:

- (Japan) Shuko Aoyama
- (United States) Jacqueline Cako
- (Greece) Valentini Grammatikopoulou
- (Chile) Alexa Guarachi
- (Australia) Priscilla Hon
- (Japan) Miyu Kato

=== Withdrawals ===
Before the tournament

- (United States) Catherine Bellis →replaced by (Chinese Taipei) Chang Kai-chen
- (United Kingdom) Johanna Konta →replaced by (Kazakhstan) Zarina Diyas
- (Serbia) Aleksandra Krunić →replaced by (Thailand) Luksika Kumkhum
- (France) Kristina Mladenovic →replaced by (Japan) Risa Ozaki
- (Czech Republic) Kristýna Plíšková →replaced by (United States) Nicole Gibbs
- (United States) Sloane Stephens →replaced by (Japan) Misa Eguchi
- (United Kingdom) Heather Watson →replaced by (Australia) Lizette Cabrera
- (China) Zheng Saisai →replaced by (Japan) Kurumi Nara

During the tournament

- (Ukraine) Elina Svitolina
- (Denmark) Caroline Wozniacki

== Doubles main-draw entrants ==
=== Seeds ===
Country	Player	Country	Player	Rank^{1}	Seed
TPE	Chan Hao-ching	TPE	Chan Yung-jan	16	1
JPN	Shuko Aoyama	CHN	Yang Zhaoxuan	61	2
JPN	Makoto Ninomiya	CZE	Renata Voráčová	73	3
JPN	Eri Hozumi	JPN	Miyu Kato	82	4

^{1} Rankings are as of October 2, 2017

=== Other entrants ===
The following pairs received wildcards into the doubles main draw:

- (Hong Kong) Katherine Ip / (Hong Kong) Zhang Ling
- (Hong Kong) Ng Kwan-yau / (Hong Kong) Wu Ho-ching

== Champions ==
=== Singles ===
- (Russia) Anastasia Pavlyuchenkova def. (Australia) Daria Gavrilova, 5–7, 6–3, 7–6^{(7–3)}

=== Doubles ===
- (Chinese Taipei) Chan Hao-ching / (Chinese Taipei) Chan Yung-jan def. (China) Lu Jiajing / (China) Wang Qiang, 6–1, 6–1
