= 2023 Hong Kong Tennis Open =

- Date: 9–15 October
- Edition: 10th
- Category: WTA 250 tournaments
- Draw: 32S / 16D
- Prize money: $259,303
- Surface: Hard
- Location: Hong Kong
- Venue: Victoria Park Tennis Stadium

Champions

Singles
- (Canada) Leylah Fernandez

Doubles
- (China) Tang Qianhui / (Chinese Taipei) Tsao Chia-yi
- Hong Kong Tennis Open

The 2023 Hong Kong Tennis Open (also known as the Prudential Hong Kong Tennis Open for sponsorship reasons) was a professional tennis tournament played on outdoor hard courts. It was the tenth edition of the tournament, and part of the WTA 250 tournaments on the 2023 WTA Tour. It took place in Victoria Park, Hong Kong from 9–15 October 2023. This was the first edition of the tournament held since 2018, as the intervening editions were canceled due to the 2019–2020 Hong Kong protests, the COVID-19 pandemic in Hong Kong, and the WTA's response to the disappearance of Peng Shuai.

== Point distribution ==
Event	W	F	SF	QF	Round of 16	Round of 32	Q	Q2	Q1
Singles	280	180	110	60	30	1	18	12	1
Doubles	280	180	110	60	1	—N/a	—N/a	—N/a	—N/a

== Champions ==
=== Singles ===
- (Canada) Leylah Fernandez def. (Czech Republic) Kateřina Siniaková, 3–6, 6–4, 6–4

=== Doubles ===
- (China) Tang Qianhui / (Chinese Taipei) Tsao Chia-yi def. (Georgia (country)) Oksana Kalashnikova / Aliaksandra Sasnovich 7–5, 1–6, [11–9]

== Singles main-draw entrants ==
=== Seeds ===
Country	Player	Rank^{1}	Seed
	Victoria Azarenka	18	1
BRA	Beatriz Haddad Maia	19	2
BEL	Elise Mertens	29	3
CHN	Wang Xinyu	37	4
	Anna Blinkova	39	5
ITA	Martina Trevisan	40	6
USA	Peyton Stearns	46	7
FRA	Varvara Gracheva	47	8

- ^{1} Rankings are as of 2 October 2023.

=== Other entrants ===
The following players received wildcards into the singles main draw:

- (Hong Kong) Eudice Chong
- (Hong Kong) Cody Wong
- (Hong Kong) Wu Ho-ching

The following players received entry from the qualifying draw:

- (Kazakhstan) Anna Danilina
- Alina Korneeva
- Sofya Lansere
- (Australia) Daria Saville

=== Withdrawals ===
- (Ukraine) Marta Kostyuk → replaced by (Australia) Priscilla Hon
- (Czech Republic) Linda Nosková → replaced by Aliaksandra Sasnovich
- Anastasia Potapova → replaced by (Ukraine) Dayana Yastremska
- (Egypt) Mayar Sherif → replaced by (Kazakhstan) Yulia Putintseva
- (United States) Sloane Stephens → replaced by (China) Wang Xiyu

== Doubles main-draw entrants ==
=== Seeds ===
Country	Player	Country	Player	Rank^{1}	Seed
KAZ	Anna Danilina		Alexandra Panova	92	1
	Lidziya Marozava	POL	Katarzyna Piter	132	2
GEO	Oksana Kalashnikova		Aliaksandra Sasnovich	145	3
ESP	Cristina Bucșa	NED	Bibiane Schoofs	152	4

- ^{1} Rankings as of 2 October 2023.

=== Other entrants ===
The following pairs received wildcards into the main draw:

- (Hong Kong) Lai Ching-laam / (Hong Kong) Sher Chun-wing
- (Hong Kong) Ng Man-ying / (Hong Kong) Wu Ho-ching

The following pair received entry as alternates:

- (United States) Dasha Ivanova / Daria Lodikova

=== Withdrawals ===
- Elina Avanesyan / (Spain) Sara Sorribes Tormo → replaced by (United States) Dasha Ivanova / Daria Lodikova
