= 2018 Hong Kong Tennis Open – Singles =

Singles
- 2018 Hong Kong Tennis Open

Final
- Champion: (Ukraine) Dayana Yastremska
- Runner-up: (China) Wang Qiang
- Score: 6–2, 6–1

Details
- Draw: 32
- Seeds: 8

Events
Singles	Doubles
- Hong Kong Tennis Open

Anastasia Pavlyuchenkova was the defending champion, but chose to compete in Linz instead.

Dayana Yastremska won her first WTA Tour title, defeating Wang Qiang in the final, 6–2, 6–1.

== Seeds ==
1. (Ukraine) Elina Svitolina (quarterfinals)
2. (Japan) Naomi Osaka (withdrew)
3. (Latvia) Jeļena Ostapenko (first round)
4. (Spain) Garbiñe Muguruza (semifinals)
5. (Ukraine) Lesia Tsurenko (withdrew)
6. (China) Wang Qiang (final)
7. (Australia) Daria Gavrilova (quarterfinals)
8. (France) Alizé Cornet (second round)

== Draw ==
Key

- Q = Qualifier
- WC = Wild card
- LL = Lucky loser
- Alt = Alternate
- ITF = ITF entry
- PR = Protected ranking
- SR = Special ranking
- SE = Special exempt
- JE = Junior exempt
- JR = Junior Accelerator Programme entrant
- CO = College Accelerator Programme entrant
- NG = Next Gen Accelerator Program entrant
- w/o = Walkover
- r = Retired
- d = Defaulted

=== Finals ===
Semifinals
6	(China) Wang Qiang	6^{5}	6	7
4	(Spain) Garbiñe Muguruza	7^{7}	4	5
(Ukraine) Dayana Yastremska	7	6
(China) Zhang Shuai	5	4

Final
6	(China) Wang Qiang	2	1
(Ukraine) Dayana Yastremska	6	6

=== Top half ===
First round
1	(Ukraine) E Svitolina	6	6
WC	(Australia) P Hon	2	3
(Australia) S Stosur	3	3
Q	(Japan) N Hibino	6	6
(United States) C McHale	6^{2}	6	6
WC	(Hong Kong) E Chong	7^{7}	2	1
WC	(Hong Kong) L Zhang	0	2
6	(China) Q Wang	6	6
4	(Spain) G Muguruza	6	6
(Spain) S Sorribes Tormo	3	1
LL	(United States) C Dolehide	7^{7}	3	5
(Romania) A Bogdan	6^{2}	6	7
(United States) J Brady	1	6^{5}
(Thailand) L Kumkhum	6	7^{7}
LL	(Israel) J Glushko	1	2
8	(France) A Cornet	6	6

Second round
1	(Ukraine) E Svitolina	6	6
Q	(Japan) N Hibino	0	3
(United States) C McHale	5	1
6	(China) Q Wang	7	6
4	(Spain) G Muguruza	6	6
(Romania) A Bogdan	2	1
(Thailand) L Kumkhum	6	4	7^{7}
8	(France) A Cornet	4	6	6^{5}

Quarterfinals
1	(Ukraine) E Svitolina	2	4
6	(China) Q Wang	6	6
4	(Spain) G Muguruza	6	7
(Thailand) L Kumkhum	2	5

Semifinals
6	(China) Q Wang	6^{5}	6	7
4	(Spain) G Muguruza	7^{7}	4	5

=== Bottom half ===
First round
(Serbia) A Krunić	1	3
(China) S Zheng	6	6
(Ukraine) D Yastremska	6	6
Q	(Hungary) F Stollár	4	4
LL	(Bulgaria) V Tomova	6	2	7^{7}
(Slovenia) D Jakupović	3	6	6^{3}
PR	(Slovakia) K Kučová	5	6	6
3	(Latvia) J Ostapenko	7	3	2
7	(Australia) D Gavrilova	3	7	6
(Kazakhstan) Z Diyas	6	5	1
(Romania) M Niculescu	4	7^{7}	6
Q	(Tunisia) O Jabeur	6	6^{0}	4
Q	(Netherlands) B Schoofs	4	0
Q	(Netherlands) L Kerkhove	6	6
Q	(Uzbekistan) S Sharipova	3	6^{3}
(China) S Zhang	6	7^{7}

Second round
(China) S Zheng	3	3
(Ukraine) D Yastremska	6	6
LL	(Bulgaria) V Tomova	1	0
PR	(Slovakia) K Kučová	6	6
7	(Australia) D Gavrilova	6	4	7^{7}
(Romania) M Niculescu	3	6	6^{3}
Q	(Netherlands) L Kerkhove	1	7^{7}	1
(China) S Zhang	6	6^{4}	6

Quarterfinals
(Ukraine) D Yastremska	7^{8}	6
PR	(Slovakia) K Kučová	6^{6}	2
7	(Australia) D Gavrilova	1	3
(China) S Zhang	6	6

Semifinals
(Ukraine) D Yastremska	7	6
(China) S Zhang	5	4

== Qualifying ==
=== Seeds ===
1. (United Kingdom) Heather Watson (first round)
2. (Tunisia) Ons Jabeur (qualified)
3. (Israel) Julia Glushko (qualifying competition, lucky loser)
4. (Japan) Nao Hibino (qualified)
5. (Hungary) Fanny Stollár (qualified)
6. (United States) Caroline Dolehide (qualifying competition, lucky loser)
7. (Uzbekistan) Sabina Sharipova (qualified)
8. (United States) Claire Liu (first round)
9. (Germany) Laura Siegemund (qualifying competition)
10. (Bulgaria) Viktoriya Tomova (qualifying competition, lucky loser)
11. (Croatia) Tereza Mrdeža (first round)
12. (Netherlands) Bibiane Schoofs (qualified)

=== Qualifiers ===
1. (Uzbekistan) Sabina Sharipova
2. (Tunisia) Ons Jabeur
3. (Netherlands) Bibiane Schoofs
4. (Japan) Nao Hibino
5. (Hungary) Fanny Stollár
6. (Netherlands) Lesley Kerkhove

=== Lucky losers ===
1. (Bulgaria) Viktoriya Tomova
2. (Israel) Julia Glushko
3. (United States) Caroline Dolehide

=== Draw ===
==== First qualifier ====
First round
1	(United Kingdom) Heather Watson	3	6	3
(China) Lu Jiajing	6	3	6
(Russia) Marina Melnikova	3	4
7	(Uzbekistan) Sabina Sharipova	6	6

Qualifying competition
(China) Lu Jiajing	3	1
7	(Uzbekistan) Sabina Sharipova	6	6

==== Second qualifier ====
First round
2	(Tunisia) Ons Jabeur	6	6
(Australia) Lizette Cabrera	4	4
(Japan) Mayo Hibi	2	4
10	(Bulgaria) Viktoriya Tomova	6	6

Qualifying competition
2	(Tunisia) Ons Jabeur	6	6
10	(Bulgaria) Viktoriya Tomova	2	1

==== Third qualifier ====
First round
3	(Israel) Julia Glushko	6	6
WC	(Hong Kong) Cody Wong	3	1
WC	(Hong Kong) Maggie Ng	1	2
12	(Netherlands) Bibiane Schoofs	6	6

Qualifying competition
3	(Israel) Julia Glushko	4	4
12	(Netherlands) Bibiane Schoofs	6	6

==== Fourth qualifier ====
First round
4	(Japan) Nao Hibino	6	6
(Japan) Ayano Shimizu	4	1
(Canada) Carol Zhao	6	2	6
11	(Croatia) Tereza Mrdeža	2	6	1

Qualifying competition
4	(Japan) Nao Hibino	6	6
(Canada) Carol Zhao	0	0

==== Fifth qualifier ====
First round
5	(Hungary) Fanny Stollár	6	6
WC	(Hong Kong) Ng Kwan-yau	0	2
(Thailand) Peangtarn Plipuech	4	4
9	(Germany) Laura Siegemund	6	6

Qualifying competition
5	(Hungary) Fanny Stollár	6	6
9	(Germany) Laura Siegemund	0	3

==== Sixth qualifier ====
First round
6	(United States) Caroline Dolehide	6	6
WC	(Hong Kong) Wu Ho-ching	2	4
(Netherlands) Lesley Kerkhove	6	6^{3}	7
8	(United States) Claire Liu	0	7^{7}	5

Qualifying competition
6	(United States) Caroline Dolehide	6^{0}	6	3
(Netherlands) Lesley Kerkhove	7^{7}	4	6
