= 2017 Hong Kong Tennis Open – Singles =

Singles
- 2017 Hong Kong Tennis Open

Final
- Champion: (Russia) Anastasia Pavlyuchenkova
- Runner-up: (Australia) Daria Gavrilova
- Score: 5–7, 6–3, 7–6^{(7–3)}

Details
- Draw: 32
- Seeds: 8

Events
Singles	Doubles
- Hong Kong Tennis Open

Caroline Wozniacki was the defending champion, but withdrew before her second round match.

Anastasia Pavlyuchenkova won the title, defeating Daria Gavrilova in the final, 5–7, 6–3, 7–6^{(7–3)}.

== Seeds ==
1. (Ukraine) Elina Svitolina (second round, withdrew)
2. (United States) Venus Williams (second round)
3. (Denmark) Caroline Wozniacki (second round, withdrew)
4. (Poland) Agnieszka Radwańska (second round)
5. (Russia) Elena Vesnina (first round)
6. (Russia) Anastasia Pavlyuchenkova (champion)
7. (Australia) Daria Gavrilova (final)
8. (China) Zhang Shuai (second round)

== Draw ==
Key

- Q = Qualifier
- WC = Wild card
- LL = Lucky loser
- Alt = Alternate
- ITF = ITF entry
- PR = Protected ranking
- SR = Special ranking
- SE = Special exempt
- JE = Junior exempt
- JR = Junior Accelerator Programme entrant
- CO = College Accelerator Programme entrant
- NG = Next Gen Accelerator Program entrant
- w/o = Walkover
- r = Retired
- d = Defaulted

=== Finals ===
Semifinals
(United States) Jennifer Brady	0	5
7	(Australia) Daria Gavrilova	6	7
(China) Wang Qiang	3	4
6	(Russia) Anastasia Pavlyuchenkova	6	6

Final
7	(Australia) Daria Gavrilova	7	3	6^{3}
6	(Russia) Anastasia Pavlyuchenkova	5	6	7^{7}

=== Top half ===
First round
1/WC	(Ukraine) E Svitolina	6	7^{7}
(Kazakhstan) Z Diyas	4	6^{2}
Q	(Greece) V Grammatikopoulou	6	2	5
(United States) N Gibbs	4	6	7
(United States) J Brady	6	6
PR	(Japan) M Eguchi	3	0
(Japan) K Nara	0	0
8	(China) S Zhang	6	6
3	(Denmark) C Wozniacki	6	6
(Canada) E Bouchard	1	1
Q	(Japan) S Aoyama	5	3
(Australia) L Cabrera	7	6
(South Korea) S-j Jang	4	4
(United States) S Rogers	6	6
Q	(Japan) M Kato	1	6^{4}
7	(Australia) D Gavrilova	6	7^{7}

Second round
1/WC	(Ukraine) E Svitolina
(United States) N Gibbs	w/o
(United States) J Brady	6	6
8	(China) S Zhang	3	4
3	(Denmark) C Wozniacki
(Australia) L Cabrera	w/o
(United States) S Rogers	1	6	2
7	(Australia) D Gavrilova	6	2	6

Quarterfinals
(United States) N Gibbs	5	4
(United States) J Brady	7	6
(Australia) L Cabrera	1	6	4
7	(Australia) D Gavrilova	6	3	6

Semifinals
(United States) J Brady	0	5
7	(Australia) D Gavrilova	6	7

=== Bottom half ===
First round
5/WC	(Russia) E Vesnina	3	4
(Thailand) L Kumkhum	6	6
(Chinese Taipei) K-c Chang	3	0
(China) Q Wang	6	6
(Australia) S Stosur	6	4	6
WC	(Chinese Taipei) Y-h Lee	3	6	1
WC	(Hong Kong) L Zhang	1	2
4	(Poland) A Radwańska	6	6
6	(Russia) A Pavlyuchenkova	6	6
(Hungary) T Babos	4	4
Q	(United States) J Cako	6	4	7^{7}
Q	(Australia) P Hon	3	6	6^{5}
(Japan) N Osaka	7	6
Q	(Chile) A Guarachi	5	4
(Japan) R Ozaki	2	2
2	(United States) V Williams	6	6

Second round
(Thailand) L Kumkhum	4	4
(China) Q Wang	6	6
(Australia) S Stosur	3	6	6
4	(Poland) A Radwańska	6	4	0
6	(Russia) A Pavlyuchenkova	7^{7}	6
Q	(United States) J Cako	6^{3}	1
(Japan) N Osaka	7	6
2	(United States) V Williams	5	2

Quarterfinals
(China) Q Wang	7	6
(Australia) S Stosur	5	2
6	(Russia) A Pavlyuchenkova	6	6
(Japan) N Osaka	3	3

Semifinals
(China) Q Wang	3	4
6	(Russia) A Pavlyuchenkova	6	6

== Qualifying ==
=== Seeds ===
1. (Japan) Miyu Kato (qualified)
2. (Switzerland) Jil Teichmann (qualifying competition)
3. (Greece) Valentini Grammatikopoulou (qualified)
4. (United States) Jacqueline Cako (qualified)
5. (Japan) Miharu Imanishi (qualifying competition)
6. (United States) Danielle Lao (qualifying competition)
7. (Japan) Riko Sawayanagi (first round)
8. (Japan) Junri Namigata (qualifying competition)
9. (Australia) Priscilla Hon (qualified)
10. (Thailand) Peangtarn Plipuech (qualifying competition)
11. (Ukraine) Katarina Zavatska (first round)
12. (China) Lu Jiajing (qualifying competition)

=== Qualifiers ===
1. (Japan) Miyu Kato
2. (Chile) Alexa Guarachi
3. (Greece) Valentini Grammatikopoulou
4. (United States) Jacqueline Cako
5. (Japan) Shuko Aoyama
6. (Australia) Priscilla Hon

=== Draw ===
==== First qualifier ====
First round
1	(Japan) Miyu Kato	6	6
(Japan) Makoto Ninomiya	4	3
(United States) Jennifer Elie	6	6^{7}	3
12	(China) Lu Jiajing	2	7^{9}	6

Qualifying competition
1	(Japan) Miyu Kato	6	6
12	(China) Lu Jiajing	4	3

==== Second qualifier ====
First round
2	(Switzerland) Jil Teichmann	7^{8}	6
(Russia) Valeria Savinykh	6^{6}	3
(Chile) Alexa Guarachi	6	6
7	(Japan) Riko Sawayanagi	4	3

Qualifying competition
2	(Switzerland) Jil Teichmann	4	6	2
(Chile) Alexa Guarachi	6	1	6

==== Third qualifier ====
First round
3	(Greece) Valentini Grammatikopoulou	6	6
WC	(Hong Kong) Cody Wong	4	4
(Thailand) Nicha Lertpitaksinchai	2	0
8	(Japan) Junri Namigata	6	6

Qualifying competition
3	(Greece) Valentini Grammatikopoulou	4	6	6
8	(Japan) Junri Namigata	6	4	1

==== Fourth qualifier ====
First round
4	(United States) Jacqueline Cako	6	6
WC	(Hong Kong) Katherine Ip	0	1
WC	(Hong Kong) Wu Ho-ching	1	4
10	(Thailand) Peangtarn Plipuech	6	6

Qualifying competition
4	(United States) Jacqueline Cako	7	6
10	(Thailand) Peangtarn Plipuech	5	3

==== Fifth qualifier ====
First round
5	(Japan) Miharu Imanishi	6	6
(China) Yang Zhaoxuan	2	3
(Japan) Shuko Aoyama	4	6	6
11	(Ukraine) Katarina Zavatska	6	0	4

Qualifying competition
5	(Japan) Miharu Imanishi	5	7^{7}	0
(Japan) Shuko Aoyama	7	6^{4}	6

==== Sixth qualifier ====
First round
6	(United States) Danielle Lao	6	6
WC	(Hong Kong) Ng Kwan-yau	0	4
(Israel) Julia Glushko	2	4
9	(Australia) Priscilla Hon	6	6

Qualifying competition
6	(United States) Danielle Lao	5	2
9	(Australia) Priscilla Hon	7	6
