= 2016 Hong Kong Tennis Open =

- Date: October 10–16
- Edition: 7th
- Category: WTA International
- Draw: 32S / 16D
- Prize money: $250,000
- Surface: Hard
- Location: Hong Kong
- Venue: Victoria Park Tennis Stadium

Champions

Singles
- (Denmark) Caroline Wozniacki

Doubles
- (Chinese Taipei) Chan Hao-ching / (Chinese Taipei) Chan Yung-jan
← 2015 ·	Hong Kong Tennis Open	· 2017 →

The 2016 Hong Kong Tennis Open (also known as the Prudential Hong Kong Tennis Open for sponsorship reasons) was a professional tennis tournament played on hard courts. It was the seventh edition of the tournament, and part of the 2016 WTA Tour. It took place in Victoria Park, Hong Kong, from October 10 to 16.

== Points and prize money ==
=== Point distribution ===
Event	W	F	SF	QF	Round of 16	Round of 32	Q	Q2	Q1
Singles	280	180	110	60	30	1	18	12	1
Doubles	280	180	110	60	1	—	—	—	—

=== Prize money ===
Event	W	F	SF	QF	Round of 16	Round of 32^{1}	Q2	Q1
Singles	$43,000	$21,400	$11,500	$6,175	$3,400	$2,100	$1,020	$600
Doubles *	$12,300	$6,400	$3,435	$1,820	$960	—	—	—

_{^{1} Qualifiers prize money is also the Round of 32 prize money}
_{* per team}

== Singles main-draw entrants ==
=== Seeds ===
Country	Player	Rank^{1}	Seed
GER	Angelique Kerber	1	1
USA	Venus Williams	13	2
GBR	Johanna Konta	14	3
AUS	Samantha Stosur	18	4
DEN	Caroline Wozniacki	22	5
FRA	Caroline Garcia	25	6
SRB	Jelena Janković	37	7
AUS	Daria Gavrilova	49	8

- ^{1} Rankings are as of October 3, 2016

=== Other entrants ===
The following players received wildcards into the singles main draw:

- (Turkey) Başak Eraydın
- (Chinese Taipei) Lee Ya-hsuan
- (Hong Kong) Zhang Ling

The following players received entry from the qualifying draw:

- (New Zealand) Marina Erakovic
- (Slovenia) Dalila Jakupović
- (Serbia) Aleksandra Krunić
- (Thailand) Luksika Kumkhum
- (Czech Republic) Tereza Martincová
- (China) Zhu Lin

=== Withdrawals ===
Before the tournament

- (Colombia) Mariana Duque Mariño → replaced by (Japan) Risa Ozaki
- (Slovakia) Kristína Kučová → replaced by (United States) Bethanie Mattek-Sands
- (Belgium) Yanina Wickmayer → replaced by (Greece) Maria Sakkari

During the tournament

- (United Kingdom) Johanna Konta

== Doubles main-draw entrants ==
=== Seeds ===
Country	Player	Country	Player	Rank^{1}	Seed
TPE	Chan Hao-Ching	TPE	Chan Yung-jan	18	1
SLO	Andreja Klepač	SLO	Katarina Srebotnik	54	2
CHN	Liang Chen	CHN	Yang Zhaoxuan	98	3
JPN	Shuko Aoyama	JPN	Makoto Ninomiya	114	4

^{1} Rankings are as of October 3, 2016

=== Other entrants ===
The following pairs received wildcards into the doubles main draw:

- (Hong Kong) Ng Kwan-yau / (China) Zheng Saisai
- (Hong Kong) Eudice Chong / (Hong Kong) Katherine Ip

== Champions ==
=== Singles ===
- (Denmark) Caroline Wozniacki def. (France) Kristina Mladenovic, 6−1, 6–7^{(4–7)}, 6−2

=== Doubles ===
- (Chinese Taipei) Chan Hao-ching / (Chinese Taipei) Chan Yung-jan def. (United Kingdom) Naomi Broady / (United Kingdom) Heather Watson, 6−3, 6–1
