= 2016 Hong Kong Tennis Open – Singles =

Singles
- 2016 Hong Kong Tennis Open

Final
- Champion: (Denmark) Caroline Wozniacki
- Runner-up: (France) Kristina Mladenovic
- Score: 6–1, 6–7^{(4–7)}, 6–2

Details
- Draw: 32
- Seeds: 8

Events
Singles	Doubles
- Hong Kong Tennis Open

Jelena Janković was the defending champion, but lost in the semifinals to Caroline Wozniacki.

Wozniacki went on to win the title, defeating Kristina Mladenovic in the final 6–1, 6–7^{(4–7)}, 6–2.

== Seeds ==
1. (Germany) Angelique Kerber (quarterfinals)
2. (United States) Venus Williams (second round)
3. (United Kingdom) Johanna Konta (second round, withdrew)
4. (Australia) Samantha Stosur (first round)
5. (Denmark) Caroline Wozniacki (champion)
6. (France) Caroline Garcia (second round)
7. (Serbia) Jelena Janković (semifinals)
8. (Australia) Daria Gavrilova (semifinals)

== Draw ==
Key

- Q = Qualifier
- WC = Wild card
- LL = Lucky loser
- Alt = Alternate
- ITF = ITF entry
- PR = Protected ranking
- SR = Special ranking
- SE = Special exempt
- JE = Junior exempt
- JR = Junior Accelerator Programme entrant
- CO = College Accelerator Programme entrant
- NG = Next Gen Accelerator Program entrant
- w/o = Walkover
- r = Retired
- d = Defaulted

=== Finals ===
Semifinals
8	(Australia) Daria Gavrilova	5	3
(France) Kristina Mladenovic	7	6
5	(Denmark) Caroline Wozniacki	6	6
7	(Serbia) Jelena Janković	3	4

Final
(France) Kristina Mladenovic	1	7^{7}	2
5	(Denmark) Caroline Wozniacki	6	6^{4}	6

=== Top half ===
First round
1	(Germany) A Kerber	6	6
(Greece) M Sakkari	4	4
(United States) L Chirico	6	6
WC	(Chinese Taipei) Y-h Lee	2	1
(Czech Republic) K Siniaková	6	4	6
(United States) N Gibbs	3	6	2
Q	(China) L Zhu	0	2
8	(Australia) D Gavrilova	6	6
4	(Australia) S Stosur	3	4
(Japan) N Hibino	6	6
(France) K Mladenovic	7^{8}	6
Q	(Slovenia) D Jakupović	6^{6}	1
(United States) B Mattek-Sands	6	6
WC	(Turkey) B Eraydın	1	2
Q	(Czech Republic) T Martincová	3	0
6	(France) C Garcia	6	6

Second round
1	(Germany) A Kerber	6	3	6
(United States) L Chirico	2	6	2
(Czech Republic) K Siniaková	2	5
8	(Australia) D Gavrilova	6	7
(Japan) N Hibino	6^{5}	2
(France) K Mladenovic	7^{7}	6
(United States) B Mattek-Sands	4	6	6
6	(France) C Garcia	6	2	4

Quarterfinals
1	(Germany) A Kerber	3	1
8	(Australia) D Gavrilova	6	6
(France) K Mladenovic	3	6	7^{7}
(United States) B Mattek-Sands	6	3	6^{3}

Semifinals
8	(Australia) D Gavrilova	5	3
(France) K Mladenovic	7	6

=== Bottom half ===
First round
5	(Denmark) C Wozniacki	6	6
(China) S Zheng	1	4
(United Kingdom) H Watson	7	7^{11}
Q	(New Zealand) M Erakovic	5	6^{9}
(China) Q Wang	6	6
WC	(Hong Kong) L Zhang	2	2
(United Kingdom) N Broady	2	2
3	(United Kingdom) J Konta	6	6
7	(Serbia) J Janković	6	6
(United States) S Crawford	3	1
Q	(Thailand) L Kumkhum	1	0
Q	(Serbia) A Krunić	6	6
(France) A Cornet	6	6
(United States) V Lepchenko	3	2
(Japan) R Ozaki	4	1
2	(United States) V Williams	6	6

Second round
5	(Denmark) C Wozniacki	6	6
(United Kingdom) H Watson	3	3
(China) Q Wang	w/o
3	(United Kingdom) J Konta
7	(Serbia) J Janković	6	6
Q	(Serbia) A Krunić	4	3
(France) A Cornet	6	3	6
2	(United States) V Williams	2	6	2

Quarterfinals
5	(Denmark) C Wozniacki	6	7
(China) Q Wang	3	5
7	(Serbia) J Janković	3	6	6
(France) A Cornet	6	4	2

Semifinals
5	(Denmark) C Wozniacki	6	6
7	(Serbia) J Janković	3	4

== Qualifying ==
=== Seeds ===
1. (New Zealand) Marina Erakovic (qualified)
2. (Serbia) Aleksandra Krunić (qualified)
3. (China) Zhu Lin (qualified)
4. (Thailand) Luksika Kumkhum (qualified)
5. (Czech Republic) Tereza Martincová (qualified)
6. (Slovenia) Dalila Jakupović (qualified)
7. (United Kingdom) Tara Moore (qualifying competition)
8. (Russia) Anastasia Pivovarova (qualifying competition)
9. (Argentina) Nadia Podoroska (qualifying competition)
10. (Japan) Shuko Aoyama (first round)
11. (China) Liu Chang (first round)
12. (Russia) Polina Leykina (qualifying competition)

=== Qualifiers ===
1. (New Zealand) Marina Erakovic
2. (Serbia) Aleksandra Krunić
3. (China) Zhu Lin
4. (Thailand) Luksika Kumkhum
5. (Czech Republic) Tereza Martincová
6. (Slovenia) Dalila Jakupović

=== Draw ===
==== First qualifier ====
First round
1	(New Zealand) Marina Erakovic	7^{8}	6
(Thailand) Peangtarn Plipuech	6^{6}	1
(India) Ankita Raina	6^{5}	6	6
11	(China) Liu Chang	7^{7}	4	3

Qualifying competition
1	(New Zealand) Marina Erakovic	6	6
(India) Ankita Raina	0	1

==== Second qualifier ====
First round
2	(Serbia) Aleksandra Krunić	6	3
(Ukraine) Lyudmyla Kichenok	1	1^{r}
(China) Lu Jiajing	3	6	6^{5}
7	(United Kingdom) Tara Moore	6	3	7^{7}

Qualifying competition
2	(Serbia) Aleksandra Krunić	6	6
7	(United Kingdom) Tara Moore	2	1

==== Third qualifier ====
First round
3	(China) Zhu Lin	6	6
WC	(Hong Kong) Hei-ching Claudia Ng	0	3
WC	(Hong Kong) Cody Wong	3	2
12	(Russia) Polina Leykina	6	6

Qualifying competition
3	(China) Zhu Lin	6	6
12	(Russia) Polina Leykina	2	3

==== Fourth qualifier ====
First round
4	(Thailand) Luksika Kumkhum	6	6
(China) Zhang Yuxuan	3	3
(Thailand) Nicha Lertpitaksinchai	1	1
8	(Russia) Anastasia Pivovarova	6	6

Qualifying competition
4	(Thailand) Luksika Kumkhum	6	6
8	(Russia) Anastasia Pivovarova	0	3

==== Fifth qualifier ====
First round
5	(Czech Republic) Tereza Martincová	6	6
(Bulgaria) Aleksandrina Naydenova	2	0
WC	(Hong Kong) Eudice Chong	4	6	6
10	(Japan) Shuko Aoyama	6	4	1

Qualifying competition
5	(Czech Republic) Tereza Martincová	6	6
WC	(Hong Kong) Eudice Chong	0	3

==== Sixth qualifier ====
First round
6	(Slovenia) Dalila Jakupović	6	6
WC	(Hong Kong) Katherine Ip	3	1
(China) Yang Zhaoxuan	3	6^{3}
9	(Argentina) Nadia Podoroska	6	7^{7}

Qualifying competition
6	(Slovenia) Dalila Jakupović	6	6
9	(Argentina) Nadia Podoroska	1	2
