= 2017 Connecticut Open – Singles =

Singles
- 2017 Connecticut Open

Final
- Champion: (Australia) Daria Gavrilova
- Runner-up: (Slovakia) Dominika Cibulková
- Score: 4–6, 6–3, 6–4

Details
- Draw: 30
- Seeds: 8

Events
Singles	Doubles
- Connecticut Open

Agnieszka Radwańska was the defending champion, but lost in the semifinals to Daria Gavrilova.

Gavrilova went on to win her first WTA Tour title, defeating Dominika Cibulková in the final, 4–6, 6–3, 6–4.

== Seeds ==
The top two seeds received a bye into the second round.

1. (Poland) Agnieszka Radwańska (semifinals)
2. (Slovakia) Dominika Cibulková (final)
3. (Czech Republic) Petra Kvitová (first round)
4. (France) Kristina Mladenovic (first round)
5. (Russia) Elena Vesnina (first round)
6. (Russia) Anastasia Pavlyuchenkova (quarterfinals)
7. (Czech Republic) Barbora Strýcová (first round)
8. (China) Peng Shuai (quarterfinals)

== Draw ==
Key

- Q = Qualifier
- WC = Wild card
- LL = Lucky loser
- Alt = Alternate
- ITF = ITF entry
- PR = Protected ranking
- SR = Special ranking
- SE = Special exempt
- JE = Junior exempt
- JR = Junior Accelerator Programme entrant
- CO = College Accelerator Programme entrant
- NG = Next Gen Accelerator Program entrant
- w/o = Walkover
- r = Retired
- d = Defaulted

=== Finals ===
Semifinals
1	(Poland) Agnieszka Radwańska	4	4
(Australia) Daria Gavrilova	6	6
Q	(Belgium) Elise Mertens	1	3
2	(Slovakia) Dominika Cibulková	6	6

Final
(Australia) Daria Gavrilova	4	6	6
2	(Slovakia) Dominika Cibulková	6	3	4

=== Top half ===
First round
(United States) L Davis	1	3
WC	(Canada) E Bouchard	6	6
(Croatia) M Lučić-Baroni	6	6^{3}	6
(Estonia) A Kontaveit	4	7^{7}	3
(Czech Republic) K Siniaková	6	3	6^{3}
8	(China) S Peng	1	6	7^{7}
4	(France) K Mladenovic	5	5
(Hungary) T Babos	7	7
(Australia) D Gavrilova	7	4	7
Q	(Czech Republic) Kr Plíšková	5	6	5
(Ukraine) L Tsurenko	2	3
Q	(Belgium) K Flipkens	6	6
Q	(Romania) A Bogdan	7	7
5	(Russia) E Vesnina	5	5

Second round
1	(Poland) A Radwańska	6	7
WC	(Canada) E Bouchard	3	5
(Croatia) M Lučić-Baroni	2	3
8	(China) S Peng	6	6
(Hungary) T Babos	5	6^{6}
(Australia) D Gavrilova	7	7^{8}
Q	(Belgium) K Flipkens	6	7^{7}
Q	(Romania) A Bogdan	1	6^{1}

Quarterfinals
1	(Poland) A Radwańska	7	6
8	(China) S Peng	5	3
(Australia) D Gavrilova	6	6
Q	(Belgium) K Flipkens	2	4

Semifinals
1	(Poland) A Radwańska	4	4
(Australia) D Gavrilova	6	6

=== Bottom half ===
First round
7	(Czech Republic) B Strýcová	5	3
(Russia) D Kasatkina	7	6
(Netherlands) K Bertens	6	4	2
Q	(Belgium) E Mertens	4	6	6
Q	(Poland) M Linette	6	6
(Italy) R Vinci	3	1
(China) S Zhang	6	6
3	(Czech Republic) P Kvitová	2	1
6	(Russia) A Pavlyuchenkova	3	6	6
LL	(United States) C McHale	6	2	4
(Spain) C Suárez Navarro	6	4
Q	(Slovakia) J Čepelová	4	0^{r}
(Kazakhstan) Y Putintseva	0	0
(France) A Cornet	6	6

Second round
(Russia) D Kasatkina	2	5
Q	(Belgium) E Mertens	6	7
Q	(Poland) M Linette	3	7^{7}	3
(China) S Zhang	6	6^{4}	6
6	(Russia) A Pavlyuchenkova	7^{7}	6
(Spain) C Suárez Navarro	6^{3}	0
(France) A Cornet	6	2	4
2	(Slovakia) D Cibulková	2	6	6

Quarterfinals
Q	(Belgium) E Mertens	w/o
(China) S Zhang
6	(Russia) A Pavlyuchenkova	5	4
2	(Slovakia) D Cibulková	7	6

Semifinals
Q	(Belgium) E Mertens	1	3
2	(Slovakia) D Cibulková	6	6

== Qualifying ==
=== Seeds ===
1. (Slovakia) Magdaléna Rybáriková (qualifying competition)
2. (Czech Republic) Kristýna Plíšková (qualified)
3. (Belgium) Elise Mertens (qualified)
4. (Germany) Mona Barthel (first round)
5. (Sweden) Johanna Larsson (second round)
6. (Romania) Irina-Camelia Begu (second round)
7. (United States) Shelby Rogers (first round)
8. (United States) Christina McHale (qualifying competition, lucky loser)
9. (Spain) Lara Arruabarrena (second round)
10. (Germany) Tatjana Maria (second round)
11. (Russia) Natalia Vikhlyantseva (qualifying competition)
12. (United States) Varvara Lepchenko (second round)

=== Qualifiers ===
1. (Belgium) Kirsten Flipkens
2. (Czech Republic) Kristýna Plíšková
3. (Belgium) Elise Mertens
4. (Poland) Magda Linette
5. (Romania) Ana Bogdan
6. (Slovakia) Jana Čepelová

=== Lucky losers ===
1. (United States) Christina McHale

=== Draw ===
==== First qualifier ====
First round
1	(Slovakia) Magdaléna Rybáriková	6	6
WC	(United States) Brienne Minor	1	1
WC	(Russia) Vera Zvonareva	2	6	6
(Australia) Anastasia Rodionova	6	3	1
(Belgium) Kirsten Flipkens	6	6
(Czech Republic) Barbora Krejčíková	3	1
(Russia) Evgeniya Rodina	4	1
10	(Germany) Tatjana Maria	6	6

Second round
1	(Slovakia) Magdaléna Rybáriková	7	0
WC	(Russia) Vera Zvonareva	5	0^{r}
(Belgium) Kirsten Flipkens	6^{4}	6	7
10	(Germany) Tatjana Maria	7^{7}	4	5

Qualifying competition
1	(Slovakia) Magdaléna Rybáriková	3	4
(Belgium) Kirsten Flipkens	6	6

==== Second qualifier ====
First round
2	(Czech Republic) Kristýna Plíšková	6	6^{6}	6
(Australia) Arina Rodionova	2	7^{8}	2
WC	(United States) Maria Mateas	6^{5}	3
(Bulgaria) Viktoriya Tomova	7^{7}	6
(Germany) Carina Witthöft	6	6
Alt	(United States) Abigail Spears	1	2
(Japan) Risa Ozaki	3	3
12	(United States) Varvara Lepchenko	6	6

Second round
2	(Czech Republic) Kristýna Plíšková	6	4	6
(Bulgaria) Viktoriya Tomova	1	6	3
(Germany) Carina Witthöft	6	6
12	(United States) Varvara Lepchenko	2	3

Qualifying competition
2	(Czech Republic) Kristýna Plíšková	6	4	6
(Germany) Carina Witthöft	2	6	3

==== Third qualifier ====
First round
3	(Belgium) Elise Mertens	7	6
(Puerto Rico) Monica Puig	5	4
(Serbia) Aleksandra Krunić	6	6
(Russia) Alla Kudryavtseva	3	2
(Russia) Ekaterina Alexandrova	7^{7}	4	4
(Japan) Shuko Aoyama	6^{4}	6	6
(United States) Kayla Day	3	2
11	(Russia) Natalia Vikhlyantseva	6	6

Second round
3	(Belgium) Elise Mertens	6	6
(Serbia) Aleksandra Krunić	4	2
(Japan) Shuko Aoyama	5	4
11	(Russia) Natalia Vikhlyantseva	7	6

Qualifying competition
3	(Belgium) Elise Mertens	6	6
11	(Russia) Natalia Vikhlyantseva	4	4

==== Fourth qualifier ====
First round
4	(Germany) Mona Barthel	2	3
(France) Pauline Parmentier	6	6
(Poland) Magda Linette	6	6
WC	(United States) Samantha Martinelli	2	1
WC	(United States) Julia Elbaba	2	2
(Japan) Kurumi Nara	6	6
(Belarus) Aliaksandra Sasnovich	6	6
7	(United States) Shelby Rogers	3	1

Second round
(France) Pauline Parmentier	1	7^{7}	4
(Poland) Magda Linette	6	6^{4}	6
(Japan) Kurumi Nara	7^{8}	6
(Belarus) Aliaksandra Sasnovich	6^{6}	4

Qualifying competition
(Poland) Magda Linette	6	6
(Japan) Kurumi Nara	2	2

==== Fifth qualifier ====
First round
5	(Sweden) Johanna Larsson	6	6
(Spain) María José Martínez Sánchez	3	3
(Romania) Ana Bogdan	6	6
(Canada) Gabriela Dabrowski	4	4
(Ukraine) Kateryna Bondarenko	6	6
(Greece) Maria Sakkari	2	4
(Czech Republic) Lucie Hradecká	3	6^{4}
9	(Spain) Lara Arruabarrena	6	7^{7}

Second round
5	(Sweden) Johanna Larsson	3	7^{7}	4
(Romania) Ana Bogdan	6	6^{3}	6
(Ukraine) Kateryna Bondarenko	6	6
9	(Spain) Lara Arruabarrena	3	1

Qualifying competition
(Romania) Ana Bogdan	6	6
(Ukraine) Kateryna Bondarenko	2	2

==== Sixth qualifier ====
First round
6	(Romania) Irina-Camelia Begu	6	6
(Switzerland) Viktorija Golubic	1	4
(Slovakia) Jana Čepelová	6	7
(Spain) Sara Sorribes Tormo	1	5
(Japan) Misaki Doi	6	6^{4}	6
WC	(United States) Sofia Kenin	3	7^{7}	0
(Brazil) Beatriz Haddad Maia	2	2
8	(United States) Christina McHale	6	6

Second round
6	(Romania) Irina-Camelia Begu	2	6^{3}
(Slovakia) Jana Čepelová	6	7^{7}
(Japan) Misaki Doi	4	6^{2}
8	(United States) Christina McHale	6	7^{7}

Qualifying competition
(Slovakia) Jana Čepelová	6	6
8	(United States) Christina McHale	3	4
