= 2023 Hong Kong Tennis Open – Doubles =

Doubles
- 2023 Hong Kong Tennis Open

Final
- Champions: (China) Tang Qianhui (Chinese Taipei) Tsao Chia-yi
- Runners-up: (Georgia (country)) Oksana Kalashnikova; Aliaksandra Sasnovich
- Score: 7–5, 1–6, [11–9]

Details
- Draw: 16
- Seeds: 4

Events
Singles	Doubles
- Hong Kong Tennis Open

Tang Qianhui and Tsao Chia-yi defeated Oksana Kalashnikova and Aliaksandra Sasnovich in the final, 7–5, 1–6, [11–9] to win the doubles tennis title at the 2023 Hong Kong Tennis Open. They saved three championship points en route to the title.

Samantha Stosur and Zhang Shuai were the defending champions from when the event was last held in 2018, but Stosur had since retired from professional tennis, and Zhang chose not to participate this year.

== Seeds ==
1. (Kazakhstan) Anna Danilina / Alexandra Panova (semifinals)
2. Lidziya Marozava / (Poland) Katarzyna Piter (semifinals)
3. (Georgia (country)) Oksana Kalashnikova / Aliaksandra Sasnovich (final)
4. (Spain) Cristina Bucșa / (Netherlands) Bibiane Schoofs (first round)

== Draw ==
Key

- Q = Qualifier
- WC = Wild card
- LL = Lucky loser
- Alt = Alternate
- ITF = ITF entry
- PR = Protected ranking
- SR = Special ranking
- SE = Special exempt
- JE = Junior exempt
- JR = Junior Accelerator Programme entrant
- CO = College Accelerator Programme entrant
- NG = Next Gen Accelerator Program entrant
- w/o = Walkover
- r = Retired
- d = Defaulted

=== Draw ===
First round
1	(Kazakhstan) A Danilina; A Panova	3	6	[10]
(Hong Kong) E Chong (Hong Kong) C Wong	6	0	[7]
(Slovenia) D Jakupović (France) E Lechemia	3	2
S Lansere; K Rakhimova	6	6
3	(Georgia (country)) O Kalashnikova; A Sasnovich	6	6
WC	(Hong Kong) M-y Ng (Hong Kong) H-c Wu	0	1
(Germany) J Lohoff (Switzerland) C Perrin	6	6
Alt	(United States) D Ivanova; D Lodikova	4	3
(Chinese Taipei) Y-c Hsieh; E Yashina	7^{19}	6
(Australia) P Hon (Chinese Taipei) Y-y Yang	6^{17}	4
(China) Q Tang (Chinese Taipei) C-y Tsao	6	6
4	(Spain) C Bucșa (Netherlands) B Schoofs	1	3
A Anshba (Czech Republic) A Dețiuc	1	2
M Andreeva (United States) P Stearns	6	6
WC	(Hong Kong) C-l Lai (Hong Kong) C-w Sher	4	1
2	L Marozava (Poland) K Piter	6	6

Quarterfinals
1	(Kazakhstan) A Danilina; A Panova	6	7^{7}
S Lansere; K Rakhimova	3	6^{4}
3	(Georgia (country)) O Kalashnikova; A Sasnovich	7	6
(Germany) J Lohoff (Switzerland) C Perrin	5	2
(Chinese Taipei) Y-c Hsieh; E Yashina	3	3
(China) Q Tang (Chinese Taipei) C-y Tsao	6	6
M Andreeva (United States) P Stearns	5	6^{6}
2	L Marozava (Poland) K Piter	7	7^{8}

Semifinals
1	(Kazakhstan) A Danilina; A Panova	4	3
3	(Georgia (country)) O Kalashnikova; A Sasnovich	6	6
(China) Q Tang (Chinese Taipei) C-y Tsao	6^{2}	6	[10]
2	L Marozava (Poland) K Piter	7^{7}	3	[6]

Final
3	(Georgia (country)) O Kalashnikova; A Sasnovich	5	6	[9]
(China) Q Tang (Chinese Taipei) C-y Tsao	7	1	[11]
