= 2017 Hong Kong Tennis Open – Doubles =

Doubles
- 2017 Hong Kong Tennis Open

Final
- Champions: (Chinese Taipei) Chan Hao-ching (Chinese Taipei) Chan Yung-jan
- Runners-up: (China) Lu Jiajing (China) Wang Qiang
- Score: 6–1, 6–1

Details
- Draw: 16
- Seeds: 4

Events
Singles	Doubles
- Hong Kong Tennis Open

Defending champions Chan Hao-ching and Chan Yung-jan successfully retained their title, defeating Lu Jiajing and Wang Qiang in the final, 6–1, 6–1.

== Seeds ==
1. (Chinese Taipei) Chan Hao-ching / (Chinese Taipei) Chan Yung-jan (champions)
2. (Japan) Shuko Aoyama / (China) Yang Zhaoxuan (first round)
3. (Japan) Makoto Ninomiya / (Czech Republic) Renata Voráčová (first round)
4. (Japan) Eri Hozumi / (Japan) Miyu Kato (semifinals)

== Draw ==
Key

- Q = Qualifier
- WC = Wild card
- LL = Lucky loser
- Alt = Alternate
- ITF = ITF entry
- PR = Protected ranking
- SR = Special ranking
- SE = Special exempt
- JE = Junior exempt
- JR = Junior Accelerator Programme entrant
- CO = College Accelerator Programme entrant
- NG = Next Gen Accelerator Program entrant
- w/o = Walkover
- r = Retired
- d = Defaulted

=== Draw ===
First round
1	(Chinese Taipei) H-c Chan (Chinese Taipei) Y-j Chan	6	6
(Kazakhstan) Z Diyas (Japan) M Eguchi	2	2
(Canada) E Bouchard (United States) S Rogers	7^{7}	6
(Israel) J Glushko (Australia) P Hon	6^{5}	4
4	(Japan) E Hozumi (Japan) M Kato	6	4	[10]
(United States) K Christian (Chile) A Guarachi	1	6	[6]
WC	(Hong Kong) K-y Ng (Hong Kong) H-c Wu	4	5
WC	(Hong Kong) K Ip (Hong Kong) L Zhang	6	7
(Thailand) L Kumkhum (Thailand) Pe Plipuech	6	6
(Japan) J Namigata (Japan) R Sawayanagi	4	4
(China) Jia Lu (China) Q Wang	6	6
3	(Japan) M Ninomiya (Czech Republic) R Voráčová	2	2
(United States) J Cako (Russia) V Savinykh	2	4
(Australia) M Adamczak (Chinese Taipei) K-c Chang	6	6
(United States) D Krawczyk (Mexico) G Olmos	3	6	[10]
2	(Japan) S Aoyama (China) Z Yang	6	4	[8]

Quarterfinals
1	(Chinese Taipei) H-c Chan (Chinese Taipei) Y-j Chan	6	6
(Canada) E Bouchard (United States) S Rogers	2	2
4	(Japan) E Hozumi (Japan) M Kato	6	6
WC	(Hong Kong) K Ip (Hong Kong) L Zhang	0	4
(Thailand) L Kumkhum (Thailand) Pe Plipuech	6	6^{4}	[7]
(China) Jia Lu (China) Q Wang	4	7^{7}	[10]
(Australia) M Adamczak (Chinese Taipei) K-c Chang	6	4	[10]
(United States) D Krawczyk (Mexico) G Olmos	4	6	[3]

Semifinals
1	(Chinese Taipei) H-c Chan (Chinese Taipei) Y-j Chan	6	6^{5}	[10]
4	(Japan) E Hozumi (Japan) M Kato	1	7^{7}	[2]
(China) Jia Lu (China) Q Wang	6	6
(Australia) M Adamczak (Chinese Taipei) K-c Chang	0	1

Final
1	(Chinese Taipei) H-c Chan (Chinese Taipei) Y-j Chan	6	6
(China) Jia Lu (China) Q Wang	1	1
