= Dasha Ivanova =

American tennis player (born 1996)

- Country (sports): United States
- Residence: Beaverton, United States
- Born: October 11, 1996 (age 29) Moscow, Russia
- Plays: Right (two-handed backhand)
- Prize money: $115,835

Singles
- Career record: 323–243
- Career titles: 6 ITF
- Highest ranking: No. 450 (24 February 2020)
- Current ranking: No. 650 (20 October 2025)

Doubles
- Career record: 213–138
- Career titles: 20 ITF
- Highest ranking: No. 364 (28 August 2017)
- Current ranking: No. 652 (20 October 2025)
- Last updated on: 22 September 2025.

Dasha Ivanova (Russian: Даша Иванова; born 11 October 1996) is a Russian-born American tennis player.

On 24 February 2020, she achieved her career-high singles ranking of world No. 450. On 28 August 2017, she peaked at No. 364 in the doubles rankings. Ivanova has won six singles and 20 doubles titles on the ITF Circuit.

== Personal life ==
Dasha Ivanova, who lives in Beaverton, Oregon, started playing tennis as an amateur at L'Academie in Boynton Beach, Florida, and picked up a tennis racket for the first time when she was five years old.

She was in a relationship with Chilean tennis player Alejandro Tabilo from 2022 to 2023.

== Career ==
In 2017, she became the champion in doubles at a tournament held in Antalya, Turkey. In June, she played in the doubles final of a tournament held in Manzanillo, Mexico

In 2018, she won the tournament in Montemor-O-Novo, Portugal and achieved the first championship of her career.

In 2019, he won the tournament in Bogotá, Colombia. In the final, her Hungarian opponent Vanda Lukács was injured in the second set and could not finish the match, and she became the champion. In May, she became the champion in doubles with her Turkish partner Cemre Anıl at the tournament in Antalya, Turkey.

In 2020, she played the final in Cancún, Mexico

Ivanova made her WTA Tour main-draw debut at the 2023 Hong Kong Tennis Open, partnering with Russian Daria Lodikova in doubles.

== ITF Circuit finals ==
=== Singles: 16 (6 titles, 10 runner-ups) ===
Legend
W25 tournaments
W10/15 tournaments

Result	W–L	Date	Tournament	Tier	Surface	Opponent	Score
Loss	0–1	Oct 2016	ITF Roehampton, United Kingdom	W10	Hard	(France) Victoria Larrière	2–6, 3–6
Loss	0–2	May 2017	ITF Antalya, Turkey	W15	Clay	(Cyprus) Raluca Șerban	5–7, 2–6
Loss	0–3	Apr 2018	ITF Sharm El Sheikh, Egypt	W15	Hard	(Belarus) Iryna Shymanovich	2–6, 1–6
Win	1–3	Sep 2018	ITF Montemor-O-Novo, Portugal	W15	Hard	(Switzerland) Nina Stadler	7–5, 6–3
Loss	1–4	Feb 2019	ITF Sharm El Sheikh, Egypt	W15	Hard	(Belgium) Magali Kempen	3–6, 4–6
Win	2–4	Oct 2019	ITF Sharm El Sheikh, Egypt	W15	Hard	(Malaysia) Jawairiah Noordin	6–7, 6–3, 6–4
Win	3–4	Oct 2019	ITF Sharm El Sheikh, Egypt	W15	Hard	(Belarus) Viktoryia Kanapatskaya	6–4, 3–6, 6–4
Win	4–4	Nov 2019	ITF Bogota, Colombia	W15	Clay	(Hungary) Vanda Lukács	6–3, 2–1 ret.
Loss	4–5	Feb 2020	ITF Cancun, Mexico	W15	Hard	(Argentina) María Carlé	4–6, 0–6
Loss	4–6	Dec 2021	ITF Santo Domingo, Dominican Republic	W15	Hard	(United States) Chanelle Van Nguyen	1–6, 1–6
Win	5–6	May 2022	ITF Cancun, Mexico	W15	Hard	(Hong Kong) Wu Ho-ching	0–6, 6–3, 6–4
Loss	5–7	Jun 2023	ITF Nakhon Si Thammarat, Thailand	W25	Hard	(Japan) Haruna Arakawa	4–6, 4–6
Win	6–7	Jun 2023	ITF Nakhon Si Thammarat, Thailand	W15	Hard	(Thailand) Patcharin Cheapchandej	7–6, 1–6, 6–3
Loss	6–8	Sep 2023	ITF Yeongwol, South Korea	W15	Hard	(South Korea) Back Da-yeon	3–6, 0–6
Loss	6–9	Mar 2025	ITF Sharm El Sheikh, Egypt	W15	Hard	(United States) Carolyn Ansari	4–6, 6–2, 3–6
Loss	6–10	Mar 2026	ITF Trois-Rivières, Canada	W15	Hard (i)	(Canada) Ariana Arseneault	0–6, 7–5, 6–7^{(3)}
