= Daria Saville =

Russian-born Australian tennis player (born 1994)

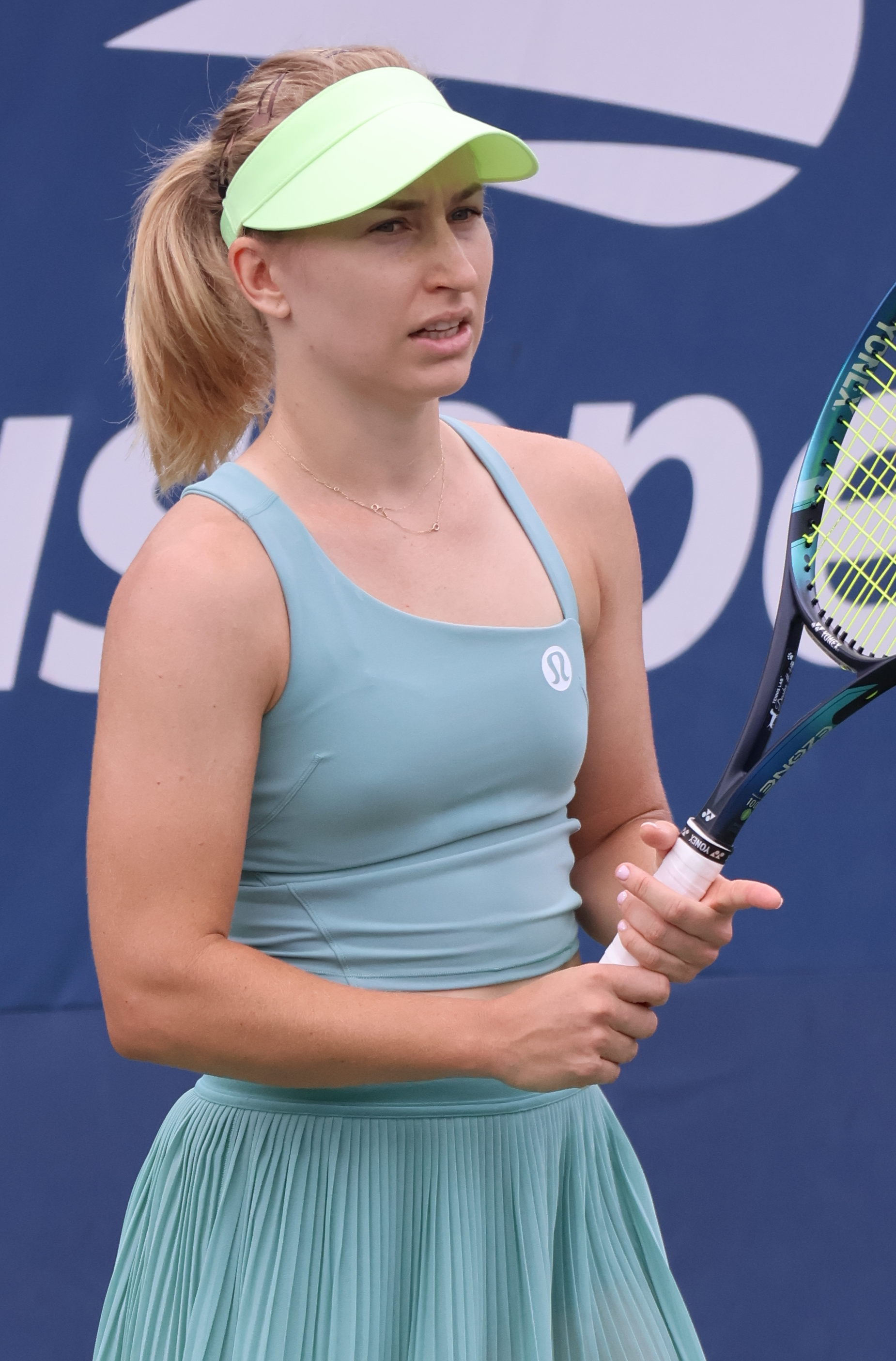
- Saville at the 2023 US Open
- Country (sports): Russia (2009–2015); Australia (2015–)
- Residence: Melbourne, Australia
- Born: 5 March 1994 (age 32) Moscow, Russia
- Height: 1.66 m (5 ft 5 in)
- Plays: Right (two-handed backhand)
- Coach: Michael Logarzo
- Prize money: US$ 6,213,083

Singles
- Career record: 343–277
- Career titles: 1
- Highest ranking: No. 20 (28 August 2017)
- Current ranking: No. 138 (16 June 2025)

Grand Slam singles results
- Australian Open: 4R (2016, 2017)
- French Open: 3R (2018, 2022)
- Wimbledon: 3R (2018)
- US Open: 2R (2017, 2018, 2023)

Other tournaments
- Olympic Games: 1R (2016)

Doubles
- Career record: 78–79
- Career titles: 3
- Highest ranking: No. 45 (25 September 2017)
- Current ranking: No. 1210 (16 June 2025)

Grand Slam doubles results
- Australian Open: 2R (2019, 2024)
- French Open: 3R (2017)
- Wimbledon: 3R (2016)
- US Open: 3R (2017)

Other doubles tournaments
- Olympic Games: 1R (2016, 2024)

Grand Slam mixed doubles results
- Australian Open: 2R (2015)
- French Open: 1R (2016)
- Wimbledon: 1R (2017, 2018)
- US Open: 2R (2015)

Team competitions
- Fed Cup: 7–8
- Hopman Cup: Australia; W (2016)
- Last updated on: 16 June 2025.

Daria Saville
Medal record

Representing Russia

Women's tennis

Youth Olympic Games
Gold medal – first place	2010 Singapore	Singles

Daria Saville OLY (née Gavrilova; born 5 March 1994) is a Russian-born Australian professional tennis player. She competed under her maiden name until her marriage to Luke Saville in 2021. On 28 August 2017, she reached her best singles ranking of world No. 20. On 25 September 2017, she peaked at No. 45 in the doubles rankings.

Saville has won one singles title and three doubles titles on the WTA Tour, and has additionally won four singles and two doubles titles on the ITF Circuit.

Saville was an accomplished junior player, having won the 2010 Youth Olympic Games and 2010 US Open, also reaching a combined career-high junior ranking of world No. 1 in August 2010.

In her career, Saville has achieved victories against former Grand Slam champions Maria Sharapova, Ana Ivanovic, Angelique Kerber (her first victory over a reigning world No. 1), and Petra Kvitová (three times), with all of these players being ranked in the top 10 at the time.

== Personal life ==
Her relationship with Australian tennis player Luke Saville influenced her decision to become an Australian citizen. They became engaged on 6 December 2018 and married on 4 December 2021, and she took his surname. In September 2025, she announced she was pregnant with the couple's first child.

Her first coach was Marina Marenko, the mother of Andrey Rublev.

== Career ==
=== 2010: No. 1 Junior ===
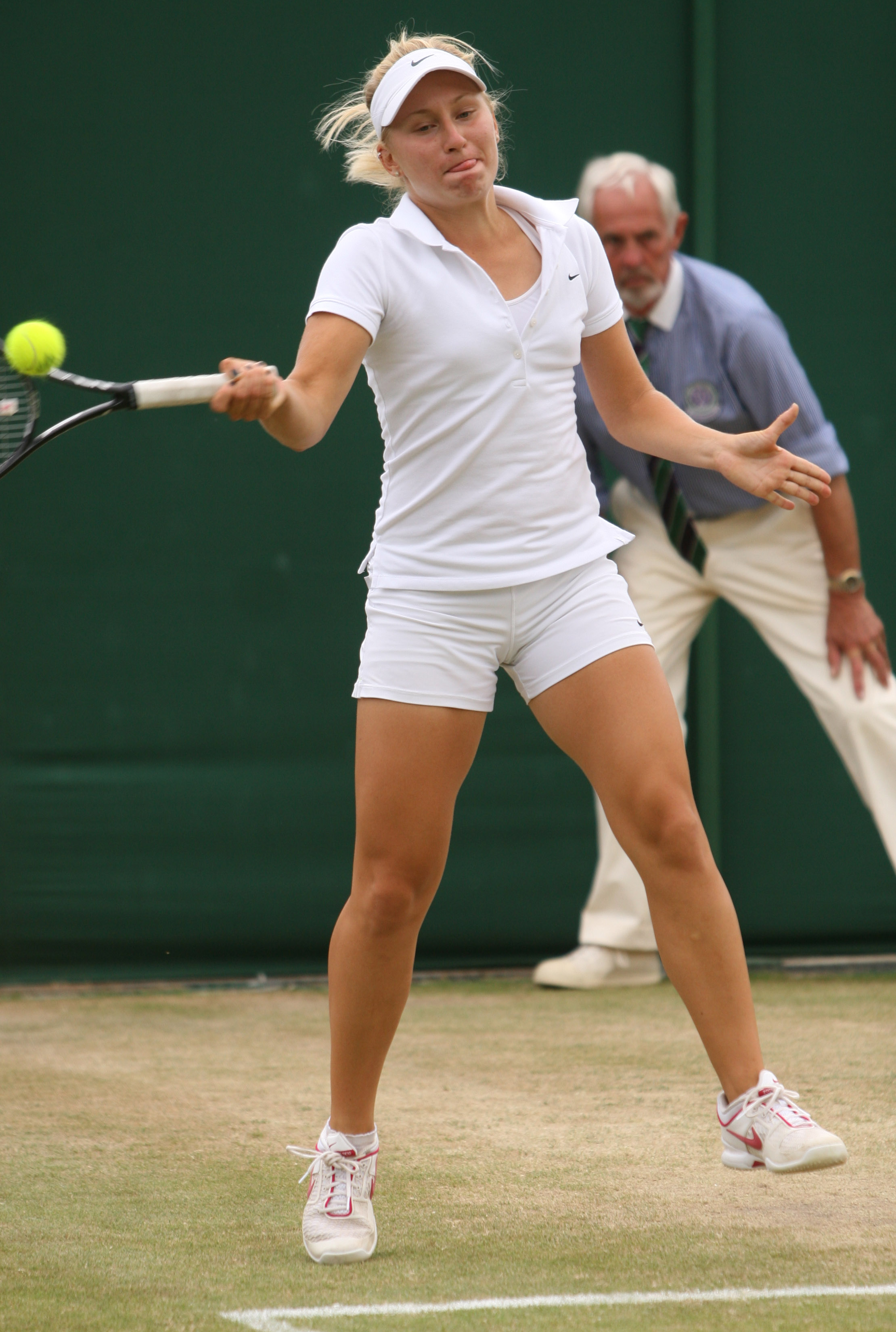
Saville in 2010

Saville was chosen to represent Russia at the inaugural Youth Olympic Games held in Singapore. Despite entering the draw unseeded, Saville progressed to the gold medal match, beating Stefanie Tan, top seed Elina Svitolina, Tang Haochen and seventh seed Jana Čepelová. In the final, Saville went a set down against Zheng Saisai of China, but rallied to win the gold medal. Following her win, Saville became the top ranked junior player by the ITF.

In September, she competed in the junior event at the US Open as the top seed. She progressed through the draw with wins over Lauren Davis, Caroline Price, Tang Haochen, Robin Anderson and Sloane Stephens to set up an all-Russian final with Yulia Putintseva, emerging with a two-sets victory. In addition, Saville competed in the doubles event with fellow Russian Irina Khromacheva, progressing to the semifinal, before losing to eventual champions Tímea Babos and Sloane Stephens.

Following her success in junior tennis, Saville was awarded a wildcard into the main draw of the WTA Tour event in her hometown of Moscow. She faced Ukraine's Alona Bondarenko and lost her WTA debut in straight sets. She ended the year as the No. 1 junior player, and at No. 515 in the WTA rankings.

=== 2011 ===
Saville suffered disappointment in her attempts to become the first junior player since Anastasia Pavlyuchenkova to win two Grand Slam titles, with first-round defeats at the Australian Open and Wimbledon events, a quarterfinal defeat to eventual champion Ons Jabeur at the French Open and a second-round defeat to American Victoria Duval in her defence of her US Open title. As the reigning junior champion, Saville was awarded a wildcard into the qualifying draw for the main event, but lost her first match against Kurumi Nara.

Beginning to compete on the ITF Women's Circuit, Saville lost her first final in the 25k event in Moscow to Lyudmyla Kichenok, but later in the year, claimed her first professional title at the 10k event in Antalya, beating fellow Russian Ksenia Lykina in the final. Saville ended the year ranked world No. 383.

=== 2012: WTA Tour debut ===
In April, Saville won her first professional doubles title, claiming the title at a 25k event in Chiasso, Switzerland, along with partner Irina Khromacheva. The pair continued their partnership at the junior event of the French Open and claimed the title with a win over Montserrat González and Beatriz Haddad Maia.

In June, Saville qualified for the main draw at a WTA Tour event for the first time, at the Rosmalen Grass Court Championships, beating higher ranked players Anastasia Rodionova and Yuliya Beygelzimer to progress there to the first round. Saville then earned her career-best win, thrashing world No. 35, Yanina Wickmayer, in straight sets but lost in the next round to Kirsten Flipkens.

=== 2013: Major debut at the Australian Open ===
Saville began her season by playing in the qualifying draw in Brisbane. She upset Mariana Duque Mariño in the first round, before losing to Vania King. At the Australian Open, Saville earned a place in the qualifying draw based on her ranking for the first time. In the first round, she beat Stephanie Vogt before upsetting 24th seed Eugenie Bouchard. In the final round of qualifying, she beat Zhou Yimiao in three sets, to earn a spot in the main draw of a Grand Slam tournament for the first time in her career. In the first round, she faced Lauren Davis and won in three sets. Saville's maiden major run came to an end in the second round against fellow qualifier Lesia Tsurenko.

In February, she competed at the Qatar Ladies Open, a Premier-5 level event. In the qualifying draw, she defeated Kristina Barrois, before losing to Tadeja Majerič. However, following the withdrawal of Maria Kirilenko, Saville returned to the draw as a lucky loser, and beat Anabel Medina Garrigues in the first round. In the second round, she played her first match against a top-ten player in world No. 2, Serena Williams, and lost in straight sets. Saville underwent a knee reconstruction in October and finished 2013 ranked No. 144.

=== 2014 ===
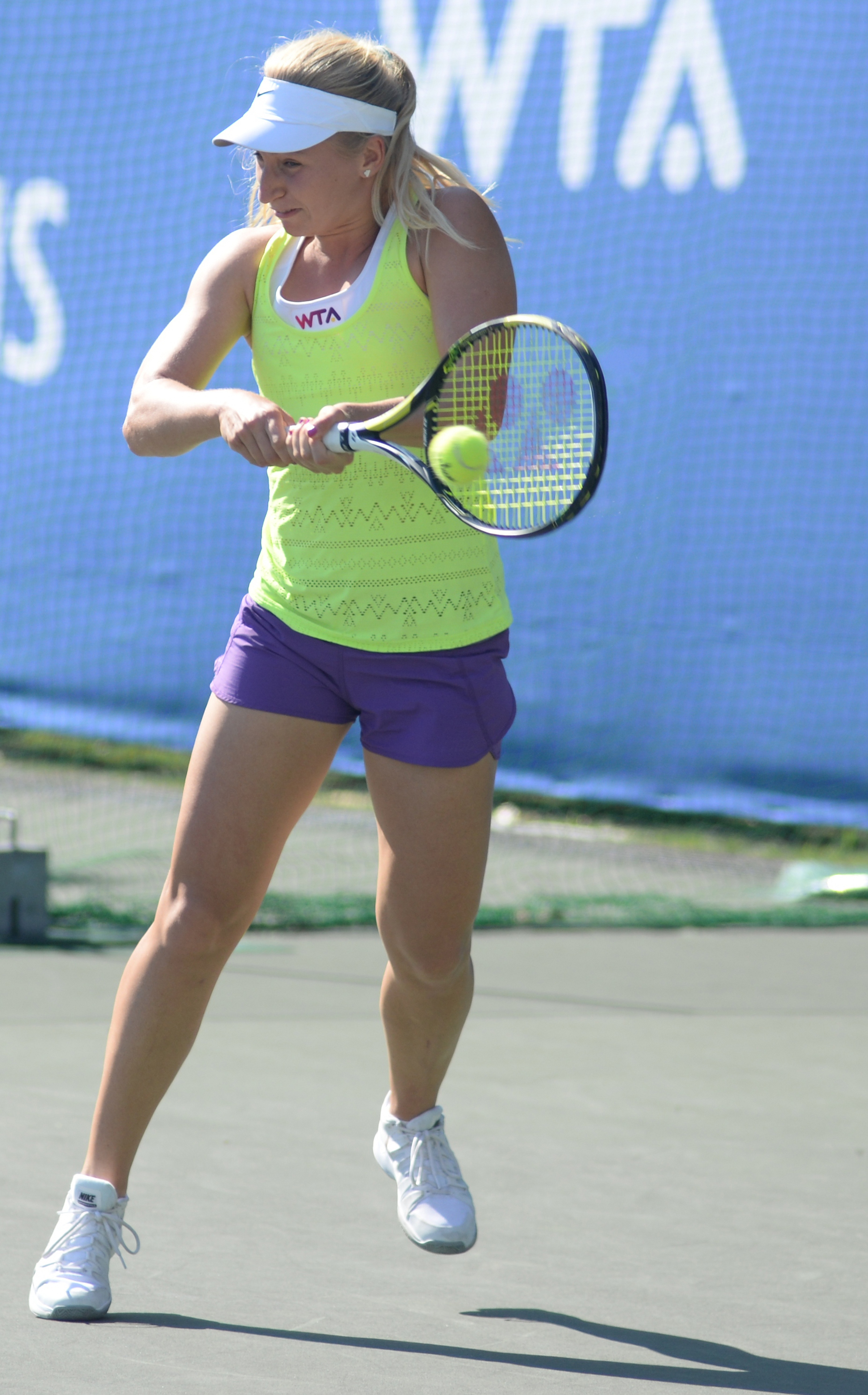
Saville at the 2014 Pan Pacific Open

She resumed to play in July on the ITF Circuit ranked No. 368. At the 50k event in Sacramento, California, her first event of the year, she claimed the doubles title alongside Storm Sanders, her highest level win to date. In August, it was announced that Saville would play at the US Open representing Australia. She made the second round of qualifying rounds, beating Tadeja Majerič but falling to Chan Yung-jan.

In September, she qualified for the Pan Pacific Open. She reached the second round, where she was beaten by Carla Suárez Navarro. In early October, Saville claimed the second singles title of her career, defeating Sabina Sharipova in straight sets to win the 25k event at Bangkok. She also reached the final of the doubles competition at the event with her partner Irina Khromacheva, but they lost in straight sets.

In December, Saville competed at the internal wildcard playoff for the 2015 Australian Open. She advanced to the final by beating top seed Olivia Rogowska in the semifinal, before beating Arina Rodionova in straight sets to guarantee herself a place in the main draw of the first major of 2015.

=== 2015: First top-10 win and WTA Tour semifinal ===
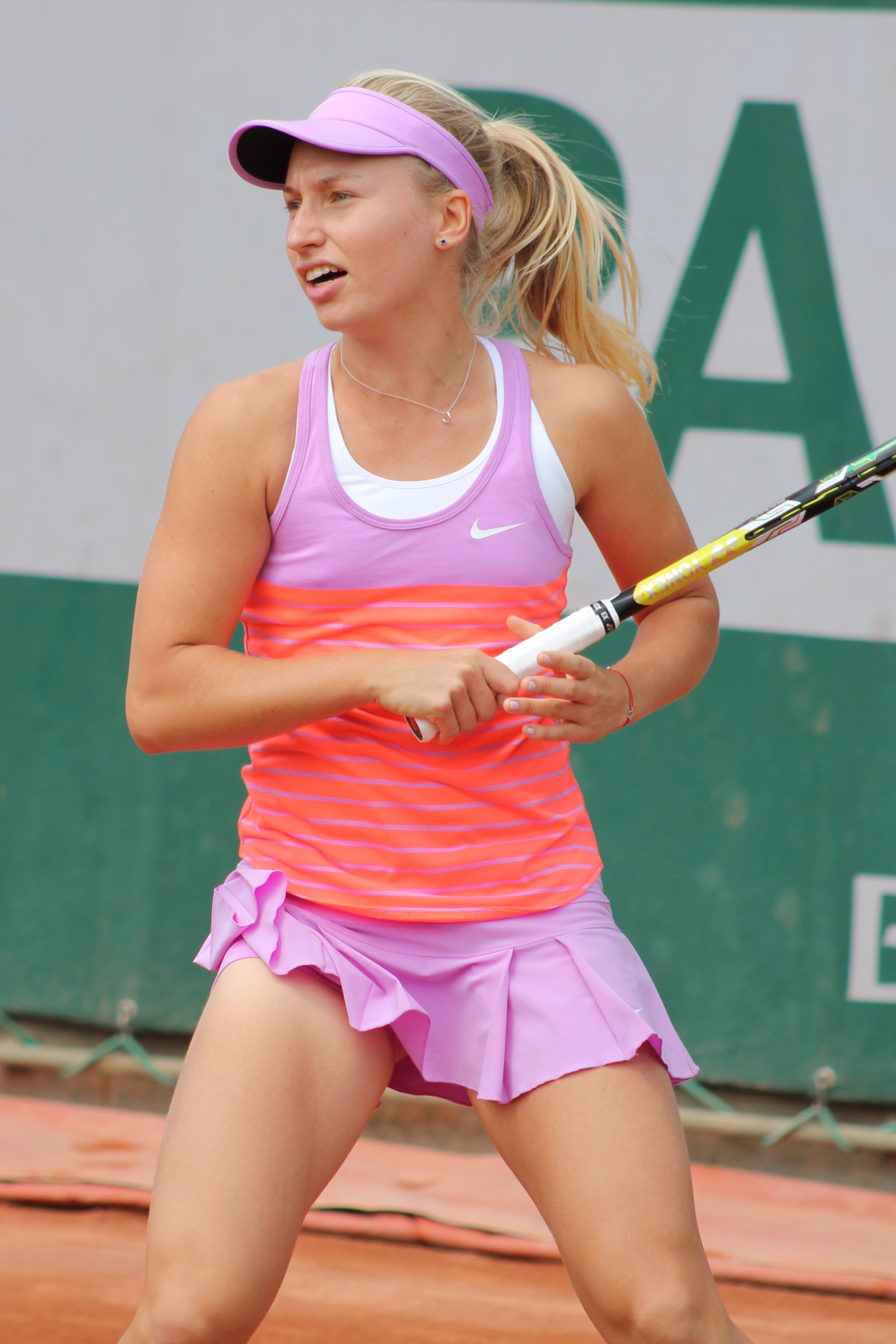
Saville at the 2015 French Open

Saville commenced the season by competing at the Brisbane International. Coming through qualifying, she lost in the second round to third seed Angelique Kerber.

In February, Saville won the 50k Burnie International in Australia, defeating top seed Irina Falconi in the final. It was her biggest title win to date. The following week, she competed at the $50k Launceston International, and advanced to the semifinals, in straight sets. There, she beat Falconi in three sets. Later that evening, she played the final against Tereza Mrdeža and won the title with a two-set victory, her second 50k title in two weeks.

In the Miami Open, Saville beat second seed Maria Sharapova in the second round, claiming her first victory over a top-ten player. She subsequently defeated Kurumi Nara in her next match, before losing to Karolína Plíšková in the fourth round. Saville then played at the 100k Open de Cagnes-sur-Mer as the third seed. She lost in the quarterfinals to Pauline Parmentier. Her next tournament was the Premier-5 Italian Open where she qualified by defeating higher ranked players Kurumi Nara and Sílvia Soler Espinosa. She then defeated world No. 33, Belinda Bencic, in three sets in the first round, and world No. 7, Ana Ivanovic. After splitting the first two sets, Saville defeated Ivanovic in the tiebreak on her eighth match point. This was her second top-ten win in a matter of months. She would then progress to the semifinals, losing there in straight sets to Maria Sharapova. It was Saville's first semifinal on the WTA Tour.

=== 2016: Hopman Cup champion and first WTA Premier final ===
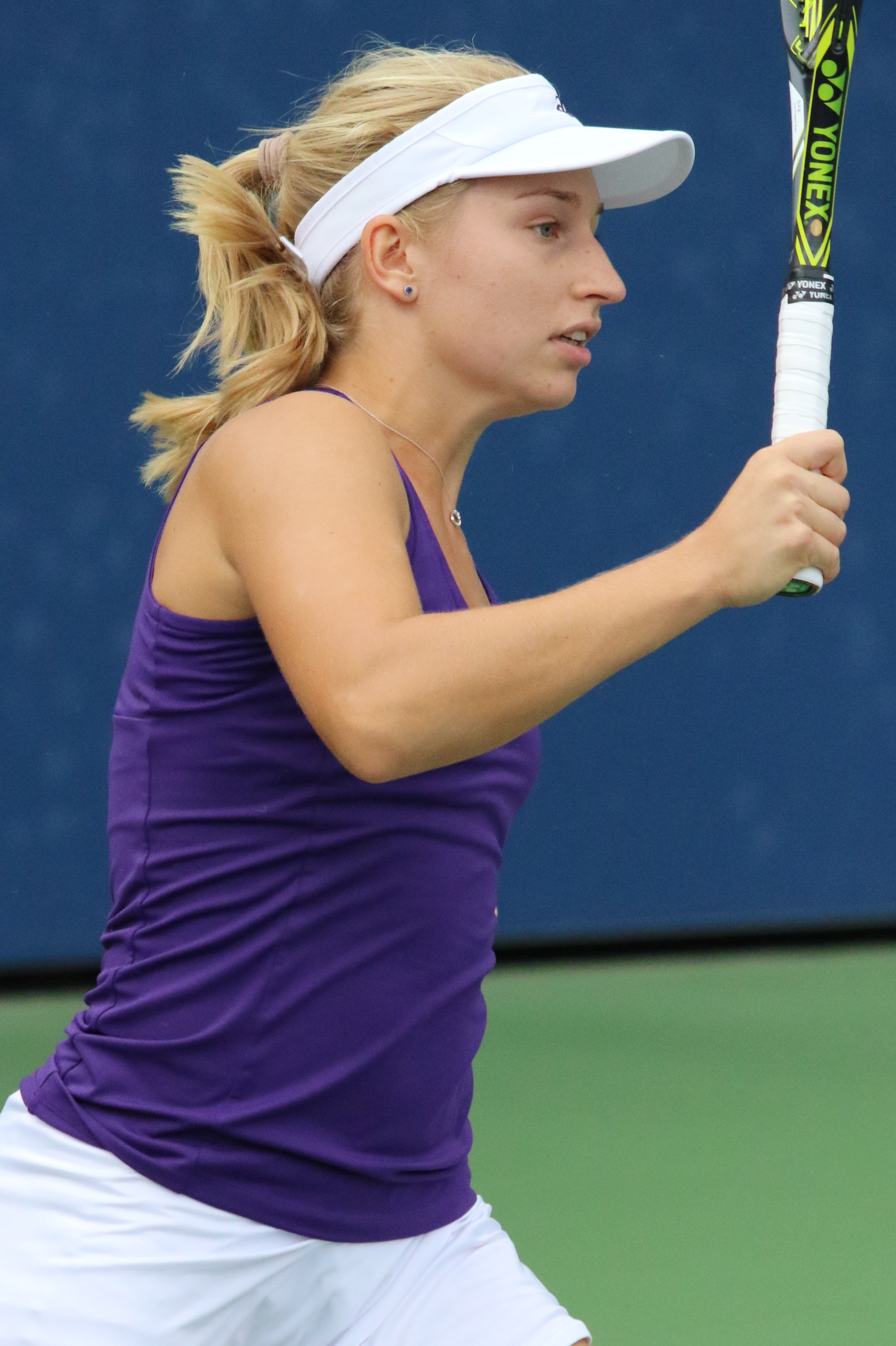
Saville at the 2016 US Open

She began her season playing at the 2016 Hopman Cup in the Australia Green team, alongside Nick Kyrgios. In the round-robin stage of the tournament, her only singles win was over Sabine Lisicki, however she and Kyrgios were undefeated in the mixed-doubles stage of each tie. In their tie against France, Saville saved a match point in the mixed doubles event when Australia was down 8–9 in the match tiebreak. They went on to win the match in three sets, securing their place in the final. Saville and Kyrgios were the eventual champions of the tournament, defeating the Ukrainian team of Elina Svitolina and Alexandr Dolgopolov in both singles matches. This was only the second time that the Australian team has won the Hopman Cup, the first time being in 1999.

In the Australian Open, she had wins against Lucie Hradecká, Petra Kvitová, and Kristina Mladenovic, but then lost in the fourth round to tenth seed Carla Suárez Navarro. In April, Saville made the quarterfinal of Madrid and the third round of Rome. At the French Open, she lost to Mariana Duque Mariño in round one and made the second round of Wimbledon. At the Olympic Games in Rio de Janeiro, Saville drew world No. 1, Serena Williams, and lost in round one. At the US Open, she lost to Lucie Šafářová, again in round one.

In October, Saville reached the quarterfinal at China Open, semifinal in Hong Kong and a week later, her first WTA Premier final in Moscow, in both doubles and singles.

=== 2017: First Premier title ===
Starting the year out in the Hopman cup partnering with Nick Kyrgios. They made it to the semifinals before losing to Team USA. Saville played in Sydney but fell in the round of 16 to eventual champion Johnna Konta. For the second year in a row, Saville made it to the fourth round at the Australian Open beating Naomi Broady, Ana Konjuh and Timea Bacsinszky. She lost to Karolína Plíšková in straight sets. In Indian Wells, Saville fell in the third round while in Miami, she fell in the second round to Lucie Šafářová. She began her clay-court season at the Charleston Open with a win over Alison Riske but losing in the round of 16 to the eventual champion and good friend, Daria Kasatkina. Her best result on clay was at the Italian Open where she had to play the qualifying and reached the quarterfinals, before losing to Kiki Bertens.

In August, Saville won her first WTA Tour title at the Connecticut Open, defeating Dominika Cibulková in the final in three sets.

=== 2019: Poor results ===
Saville kicked off her 2019 season at the Brisbane International. She lost in the first round to eighth seed Anastasija Sevastova. In Sydney, she was defeated in the first round by qualifier Yulia Putintseva. At the Australian Open, she lost in the first round to Tamara Zidanšek.

At the St. Petersburg Ladies' Trophy, Saville was defeated in the first round by Maria Sharapova. During the Fed Cup tie versus the U.S. team, she played one rubber and lost to Danielle Collins. Despite her loss, Australia ended up winning the tie 3–2. At the Mexican Open, she was defeated in the first round by fourth seed Mihaela Buzărnescu. In March, she competed at the Indian Wells Open where she reached the third round, before losing to sixth seed Elina Svitolina. At the Miami Open, she was defeated in the first round by Viktória Kužmová.

Beginning her clay-court season at the Morocco Open, she lost in the first round to second seed Hsieh Su-wei. At the Madrid Open, she was defeated in the first round by ninth seed Ash Barty. In Rome, she lost in the first round of qualifying to Irina-Camelia Begu. Playing her final tournament before the French Open, she advanced to the quarterfinals of the Internationaux de Strasbourg being defeated by Chloé Paquet. At the French Open, she retired from her first-round match against Aleksandra Krunić due to a thigh injury.

In Eastbourne, Saville lost in the final round of qualifying to Fiona Ferro. Despite the loss, she entered the main draw as a lucky loser where she reached the second round and was defeated by Zhang Shuai. At the Wimbledon Championships, she lost in the first round to eighth seed and eventual semifinalist, Elina Svitolina.

Seeded seventh at the Ladies Open Lausanne, Saville was defeated in the second round by Natalia Vikhlyantseva. At the Palermo Ladies Open, Saville lost in the first round to eighth seed and eventual champion, Jil Teichmann. Seeded fifth at the first edition of the Karlsruhe Open, Saville was defeated in the first round by Tereza Martincová.

At the US Open, Saville lost in the first round to Fiona Ferro. She didn't play any more tournaments for the rest of the season due to injuries. She ended the season ranked No. 237.

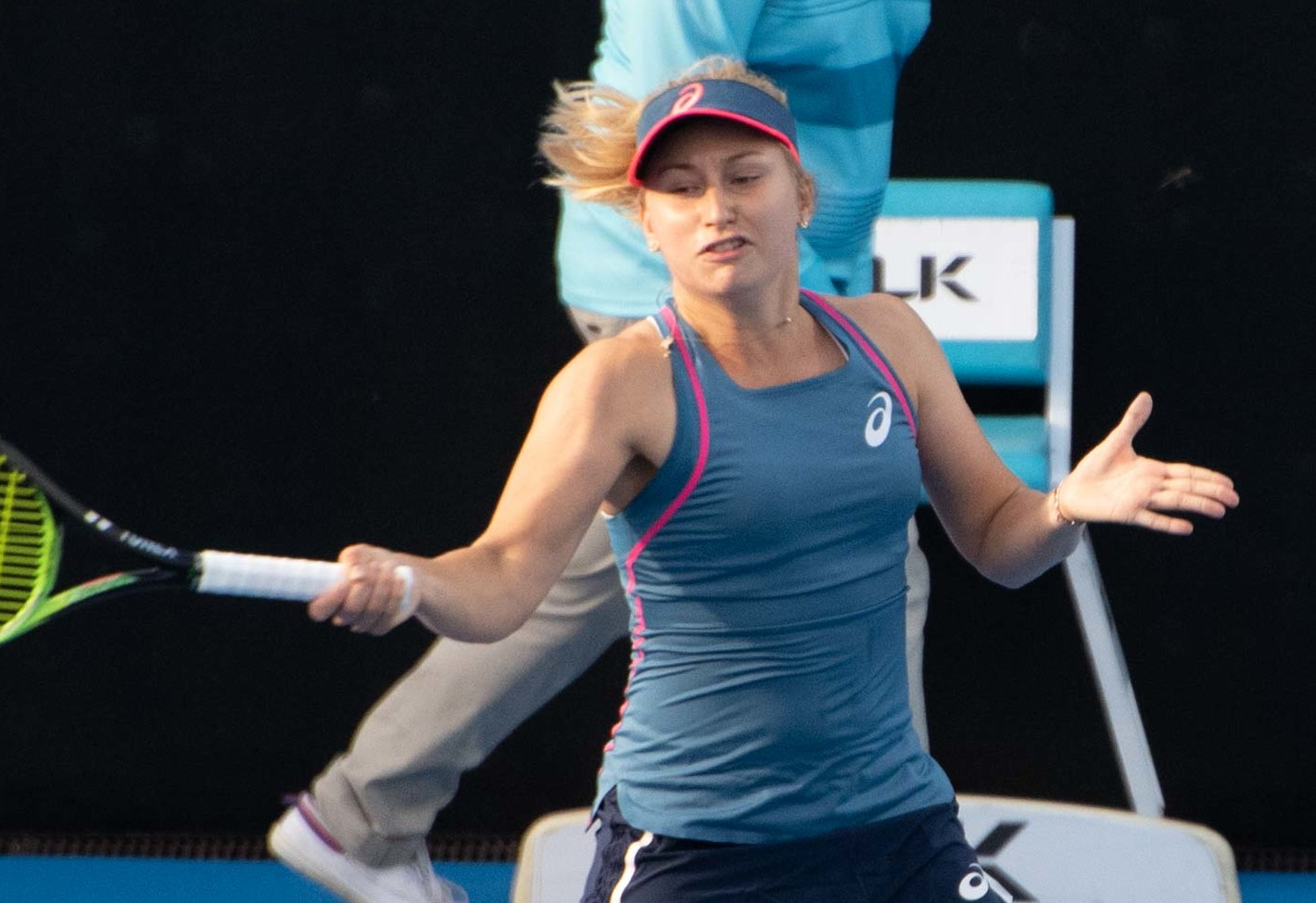
Saville at the 2019 Sydney International

=== 2020–2021: Injuries ===
Saville missed the Australian Open due to recovering from an achilles tendon injury and plantar fasciitis.

She returned to action in September at the Open de Cagnes-sur-Mer. Getting past qualifying, she made it to the quarterfinals where she lost to Viktoriya Tomova. At the French Open, she got her first victory since July 2019 by upsetting 24th seed Dayana Yastremska in the first round. She was defeated in the second round by Eugenie Bouchard.

Saville ended the year ranked 446.

She started 2021 season at the first edition of the Yarra Valley Classic where she lost in the second round to fifth seed Serena Williams. At the Australian Open, she was defeated in the second round by top seed Ashleigh Barty.

After the championship, Saville announced that she was going to get surgery on her achilles tendon.

In November, Saville represented Australia at the Billie Jean King Cup Finals defeating world No. 70, Greet Minnen, in her first professional match since February. Australia lost in the semifinals against Switzerland.

Saville ended the season ranked 419.

=== 2022: Lowest ranked quarterfinalist in Miami Open history, return to top 50, second ACL injury ===
Saville began her season at the Adelaide International 1, defeating Caty McNally and Katie Boulter in qualifying, before losing to Iga Świątek in the first round. She received a wildcard into the Adelaide International 2, but again lost in the first round to Ana Konjuh. Receiving another wildcard into the main draw of the Australian Open, she lost in the first round to Rebecca Peterson. Using a protected ranking, Saville entered the Abierto Zapopan ranked No. 627 in the world. She defeated reigning US Open champion and top seed, Emma Raducanu, in the first round and Caroline Dolehide in the second, before losing to eventual champion Sloane Stephens in the quarterfinals. This run saw her ranking rise to No. 410.

In March, Saville made it through qualifying at Indian Wells, defeating Kamilla Rakhimova and Magdalena Fręch. She beat Zhang Shuai in the first round before defeating ninth seed Ons Jabeur in the second; this was Saville's first top-10 win since 2018. She then defeated 20th seed Elise Mertens, before retiring in the fourth round against eventual finalist and sixth seed Maria Sakkari. The following week, she received a main-draw wildcard to compete at the Miami Open. She reached the quarterfinals, defeating Greet Minnen, lucky loser Harmony Tan, Kateřina Siniaková, and lucky loser Lucia Bronzetti. She became the lowest ranked Miami quarterfinalist in history, ranked No. 249 at the time. She lost to 22nd seed Belinda Bencic in the quarterfinals.

At the German Open in Berlin, she reached the second round as a qualifier. As a result, she returned to the top 100 in the singles rankings.

At the Washington Open, Saville reached the semifinals, beating the top seed and world No. 7, Jessica Pegula, en route. Next, she lost to sixth seed Kaia Kanepi. As a result, she reached her highest ranking since her return from injury.. At the Pan Pacific Open in Tokyo, Saville tore her ACL while playing against home favourite Naomi Osaka in her opening-round match. She has since undergone surgery and has now returned to playing at the WTA event in Birmingham.

=== 2023: Return to WTA Tour ===
Saville returned to tour after a long absence due to ACL injury at Wimbledon. She lost to Katie Boulter in the first round. Saville was leading 4–2 in the first set tie-break when a protester invaded the court and threw puzzle pieces and confetti which disrupted play. After both Saville and Boulter helped clean up the mess, play continued with Boulter winning the next five points to win the first set, ahead of a straight-sets victory. Saville later said she was upset by the distraction, stating: "Oh my God, why on my court out of all of them? I'm the worst with being able to refocus.".

Saville then played the Hungarian Open losing to Maria Timofeeva in a tight three sets. Saville then played the German Open in Hamburg where she reached semifinals, after beating the likes of Jasmine Paolini, Tamara Korpatsch and Jule Niemeier as well as other players in the qualifying rounds. Saville fell short to Arantxa Rus in that semifinal.

During the American hardcourt swing, Saville lost in qualifying to Kimberly Birrell at the Canadian Open. She then beat Clervie Ngounoue in round one of the US Open, before losing to top seed Iga Świątek.

Using protected ranking, Saville played in China at the Guangzhou and the China Open reaching the second round, and at the Ningbo Open. She also qualified for the Hong Kong Open.

=== 2024: Semifinalist in Hobart, out of top 100 ===
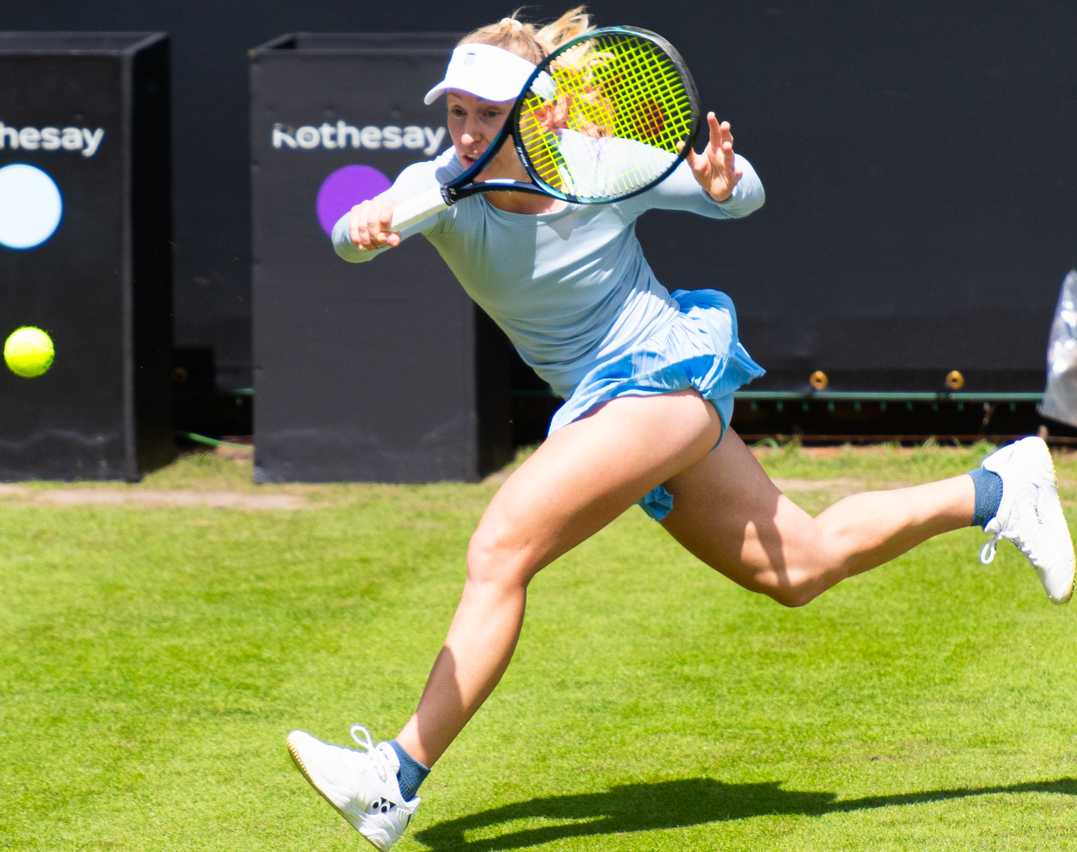
Saville at the 2024 Birmingham Classic

She fell out of the top 100 on 9 September 2024.

== Performance timelines ==
Key
W	F	SF	QF	#R	RR	Q#	P#	DNQ	A	Z#	PO	G	S	B	NMS	NTI	P	NH

(W) winner; (F) finalist; (SF) semifinalist; (QF) quarterfinalist; (#R) rounds 4, 3, 2, 1; (RR) round-robin stage; (Q#) qualification round; (P#) preliminary round; (DNQ) did not qualify; (A) absent; (Z#) Davis/Fed Cup Zonal Group (with number indication) or (PO) play-off; (G) gold, (S) silver or (B) bronze Olympic/Paralympic medal; (NMS) not a Masters tournament; (NTI) not a Tier I tournament; (P) postponed; (NH) not held; (SR) strike rate (events won / competed); (W–L) win–loss record.
To avoid confusion and double counting, these charts are updated at the conclusion of a tournament or when the player's participation has ended.

Only main-draw results in WTA Tour, Grand Slam tournaments, Billie Jean King Cup, United Cup, Hopman Cup and Olympic Games are included in win–loss records.

Note: Saville played under Russian flag until 2015.

=== Singles ===
Current through the 2025 Australian Open.

Tournament	2010	2011	2012	2013	2014	2015	2016	2017	2018	2019	2020	2021	2022	2023	2024	2025	SR	W–L	Win%
Grand Slam tournaments
Australian Open	A	A	A	2R	A	1R	4R	4R	2R	1R	A	2R	1R	A	1R	1R	0 / 10	9–10	47%
French Open	A	A	A	Q3	A	2R	1R	1R	3R	1R	2R	A	3R	A	1R	1R	0 / 9	6–9	40%
Wimbledon	A	A	A	Q1	A	1R	2R	1R	3R	1R	NH	A	1R	1R	2R	Q1	0 / 8	4–8	33%
US Open	A	Q1	A	Q2	Q2	1R	1R	2R	2R	1R	A	A	1R	2R	1R	Q1	0 / 8	3–8	27%
Win–loss	0–0	0–0	0–0	1–1	0–0	1–4	4–4	4–4	6–4	0–4	1–1	1–1	2–4	1–2	1–4	0–2	0 / 35	22–35	39%
National representation
Summer Olympics	NH		A	NH			1R	NH				A	NH		A	NH	0 / 1	0–1	0%
Billie Jean King Cup (Note: Formerly known as Fed Cup until 2020.)	A	A	A	A	A	A	PO	WG2	PO	F	SF (Note: Edition is split into the two years due to COVID-19.)		A	RR	A		0 / 3	4–7	36%
WTA 1000
Dubai / Qatar Open (Note: The first Premier 5 event of the year has switched back and forth between the Dubai Tennis Championships and the Qatar Ladies Open since 2009. Dubai was classified as a Premier 5 event from 2009 to 2011 before being succeeded by Doha for the 2012–2014 period. In 2015, Dubai regained its Premier 5 status while Doha was demoted to Premier status. The Premier 5 tournaments were reclassified as WTA 1000 tournaments in 2021.)	A	A	A	2R	A	A	2R	A	A	A	A	A	A	A	A	Q2	0 / 2	2–2	50%
Indian Wells Open	A	A	A	A	A	2R	2R	3R	3R	3R	NH	A	4R	A	1R	Q2	0 / 7	8–7	53%
Miami Open	A	A	A	A	A	4R	2R	2R	3R	1R	NH	A	QF	A	2R	Q1	0 / 7	9–7	56%
Madrid Open	A	A	A	A	A	A	QF	1R	1R	1R	NH	A	Q1	A	2R	A	0 / 5	4–5	44%
Italian Open	A	A	A	A	A	SF	3R	QF	3R	Q1	A	A	A	A	1R	Q1	0 / 5	11–5	69%
Canadian Open	A	A	A	A	A	3R	2R	2R	1R	A	NH	A	A	Q1	A		0 / 4	4–4	50%
Cincinnati Open	A	A	A	A	A	2R	3R	2R	1R	A	A	A	A	A	A		0 / 4	4–4	50%
Guadalajara Open	NH												A	A	NMS		0 / 0	0–0	–
Pan Pacific / Wuhan Open (Note: In 2014, the Pan Pacific Open was downgraded to a Premier event and replaced by the Wuhan Open. The Premier 5 tournaments were reclassified as WTA 1000 tournaments in 2021.)	A	A	A	1R	A	2R	1R	1R	3R	A	NH			A	A		0 / 5	3–5	38%
China Open	A	A	A	A	A	1R	QF	3R	2R	A	NH			2R	A		0 / 5	7–5	60%
Win–loss	0–0	0–0	0–0	1–2	0–0	12–7	12–9	8–8	7–8	2–3	0–0	0–0	7–2	1–1	2–4	0–0	0 / 44	52–44	54%
Career statistics
	2010	2011	2012	2013	2014	2015	2016	2017	2018	2019	2020	2021	2022	2023	2024	2025	SR	W–L	Win%
Tournaments	1	0	1	6	1	21	20	23	23	16	1	2	15	8	19	4	Career total: 159		
Titles	0	0	0	0	0	0	0	1	0	0	0	0	0	0	0	0	Career total: 1		
Finals	0	0	0	0	0	0	1	3	0	0	0	0	1	0	0	0	Career total: 5		
Overall win–loss	0–1	0–0	1–1	2–6	1–1	20–20	29–23	36–26	28–27	6–17	1–1	3–2	18–15	6–8	14–19	3–4	1 / 159	159–158	50%
Year-end ranking	515	383	215	144	233	36	25	25	38	237	446	419	53	206	120		$5,212,483		

=== Doubles ===
Tournament	2015	2016	2017	2018	2019	...	2022	2023	2024	2025	SR	W–L	Win%
Australian Open	1R	1R	1R	1R	2R		1R	A	2R	1R	0 / 8	2–8	20%
French Open	A	1R	3R	1R	A		A	A	1R	A	0 / 4	2–4	33%
Wimbledon	1R	3R	A	1R	A		1R	2R	1R		0 / 6	3–6	33%
US Open	1R	2R	3R	1R	A		2R	2R	A		0 / 6	5–6	45%
Win–loss	0–3	3–4	4–3	0–4	1–1		1–3	2–2	1–3	0–1	0 / 24	12–24	33%

== WTA Tour finals ==
=== Singles: 5 (1 title, 4 runner-ups) ===
Legend Grand Slam (0–0) WTA 1000 (0–0) WTA 500 (1–1) WTA 250 (0–3)	Finals by surface Hard (1–3) Grass (0–0) Clay (0–1)

Result	W–L	Date	Tournament	Tier	Surface	Opponent	Score
Loss	0–1	Oct 2016	Kremlin Cup, Russia	Premier (Note: The WTA Premier tournaments were reclassified as WTA 500 tournaments in 2021.)	Hard (i)	(Russia) Svetlana Kuznetsova	2–6, 1–6
Loss	0–2	May 2017	Internationaux de Strasbourg, France	International (Note: The WTA International tournaments were reclassified as WTA 250 tournaments in 2021.)	Clay	(Australia) Samantha Stosur	7–5, 4–6, 3–6
Win	1–2	Aug 2017	Connecticut Open, United States	Premier	Hard	(Slovakia) Dominika Cibulková	4–6, 6–3, 6–4
Loss	1–3	Oct 2017	Hong Kong Open, China SAR	International	Hard	(Russia) Anastasia Pavlyuchenkova	7–5, 3–6, 6–7^{(3–7)}
Loss	1–4	Aug 2022	Championnats de Granby, Canada	WTA 250	Hard	Daria Kasatkina	4–6, 4–6

=== Doubles: 5 (3 titles, 2 runner-ups) ===
Legend
WTA 1000 (0–0)
WTA 500 (0–2)
WTA 250 (3–0)

Result	W–L	Date	Tournament	Tier	Surface	Partner	Opponents	Score
Win	1–0	Jul 2015	İstanbul Cup, Turkey	International	Hard	(Ukraine) Elina Svitolina	(Turkey) Çağla Büyükakçay (Serbia) Jelena Janković	5–7, 6–1, [10–4]
Loss	1–1	Oct 2016	Kremlin Cup, Russia	Premier	Hard (i)	(Russia) Daria Kasatkina	(Czech Republic) Andrea Hlaváčková (Czech Republic) Lucie Hradecká	6–4, 0–6, [7–10]
Loss	1–2	Sep 2017	Pan Pacific Open, Japan	Premier	Hard	(Russia) Daria Kasatkina	(Slovenia) Andreja Klepač (Spain) María José Martínez Sánchez	3–6, 2–6
Win	2–2	May 2019	Internationaux de Strasbourg, France	International	Clay	(Australia) Ellen Perez	(China) Duan Yingying (China) Han Xinyun	6–4, 6–3
Win	3–2	May 2022	Internationaux de Strasbourg, France (2)	WTA 250	Clay	(United States) Nicole Melichar-Martinez	(Czech Republic) Lucie Hradecká (India) Sania Mirza	5–7, 7–5, [10–6]

== ITF Circuit finals ==
=== Singles: 7 (5 titles, 2 runner-ups) ===
Legend
$50,000 tournaments (3–0)
$25,000 tournaments (1–2)
$10,000 tournaments (1–0)

Result	W–L	Date	Tournament	Tier	Surface	Opponent	Score
Loss	0–1	Mar 2011	ITF Moscow, Russia	25,000	Hard	(Ukraine) Lyudmyla Kichenok	2–6, 0–6
Win	1–1	Apr 2011	ITF Antalya, Turkey	10,000	Hard	(Russia) Ksenia Lykina	6–4, 4–6, 6–2
Loss	1–2	May 2012	ITF Moscow, Russia	25,000	Clay	(Russia) Margarita Gasparyan	6–4, 4–6, 6–7
Win	2–2	Oct 2014	ITF Bangkok, Thailand	25,000	Hard	(Uzbekistan) Sabina Sharipova	7–6, 6–3
Win	3–2	Feb 2015	Burnie International, Australia	50,000	Hard	(United States) Irina Falconi	7–5, 7–5
Win	4–2	Feb 2015	Launceston International, Australia	50,000	Hard	(Croatia) Tereza Mrdeža	6–1, 6–2
Win	5–2	Nov 2024	Gold Coast International, Australia	50,000	Hard	(Australia) Lizette Cabrera	7–5, 7–6^{(3)}

=== Doubles: 3 (2 titles, 1 runner-up) ===
Legend
$50,000 tournaments (1–0)
$25,000 tournaments (1–1)

Result	W–L	Date	Tournament	Tier	Surface	Partner	Opponents	Score
Win	1–0	Apr 2012	Chiasso Open, Switzerland	25,000	Clay	(Russia) Irina Khromacheva	(Switzerland) Conny Perrin (Slovenia) Maša Zec-Peškirič	6–0, 7–6
Win	2–0	Jul 2014	Sacramento Challenger, United States	50,000	Hard	(Australia) Storm Sanders	(United States) Maria Sanchez (United States) Zoë Gwen Scandalis	6–2, 6–1
Loss	2–1	Oct 2014	ITF Bangkok, Thailand	25,000	Hard	(Russia) Irina Khromacheva	(China) Liu Chang (China) Lu Jiajing	4–6, 3–6

== Team competition ==
Result	Date	Tournament	Surface	Partner	Opponents	Score
Win	Jan 2016	Hopman Cup, Australia	Hard (i)	(Australia) Nick Kyrgios	(Ukraine) Elina Svitolina (Ukraine) Alexandr Dolgopolov	2–0

== Junior Grand Slam tournament finals ==
=== Girls' singles: 2 (1 title, 1 runner-up) ===
Result	Year	Tournament	Surface	Opponent	Score
Loss	2009	French Open	Clay	(France) Kristina Mladenovic	3–6, 2–6
Win	2010	US Open	Hard	(Russia) Yulia Putintseva	6–3, 6–2

=== Girls' doubles: 1 (title) ===
Result	Year	Tournament	Surface	Partner	Opponents	Score
Win	2012	French Open	Clay	(Russia) Irina Khromacheva	(Paraguay) Montserrat González (Brazil) Beatriz Haddad Maia	4–6, 6–4, [10–8]

== Summer Youth Olympic Games ==
=== Singles: 1 (gold medal) ===
Result	Year	Host city	Surface	Opponent	Score
Win	2010	Singapore	Hard	(China) Zheng Saisai	2–6, 6–2, 6–0

== Top 10 wins ==
Season	2015	2016	2017	2018	...	2022	Total
Wins	3	4	2	2		2	13

#	Player	Rank	Event	Surface	Rd	Score	DSR
2015
1.	(Russia) Maria Sharapova	No. 2	Miami Open, US	Hard	2R	7–6^{(7–4)}, 6–3	97
2.	(Serbia) Ana Ivanovic	No. 7	Italian Open, Rome	Clay	2R	5–7, 7–6^{(7–2)}, 7–6^{(9–7)}	78
3.	(Czech Republic) Lucie Šafářová	No. 8	Canadian Open, Toronto	Hard	2R	4–6, 7–5, 7–5	40
2016
4.	(Czech Republic) Petra Kvitová	No. 7	Australian Open	Hard	2R	6–4, 6–4	39
5.	(Czech Republic) Petra Kvitová	No. 6	Madrid Open, Spain	Clay	3R	6–3, 6–4	39
6.	(Romania) Simona Halep	No. 5	Rome, Italy	Clay	2R	6–3, 4–6, 6–3	32
7.	(Germany) Angelique Kerber	No. 1	Hong Kong Open, China SAR	Hard	QF	6–3, 6–1	49
2017
8.	(Russia) Svetlana Kuznetsova	No. 8	Rome, Italy	Clay	3R	2–6, 7–5, 6–4	33
9.	(Poland) Agnieszka Radwańska	No. 10	Connecticut Open, US	Hard	SF	6–4, 6–4	26
2018
10.	(Spain) Garbiñe Muguruza	No. 3	Rome, Italy	Clay	2R	5–7, 6–2, 7–6^{(8–6)}	24
11.	(Czech Republic) Petra Kvitová	No. 5	China Open, Beijing	Hard	1R	6–2, 6–1	33
2022
12.	(Tunisia) Ons Jabeur	No. 10	Indian Wells Open, US	Hard	2R	7–5, 6–7^{(0–7)}, 6–4	409
13.	(United States) Jessica Pegula	No. 7	Washington Open, US	Hard	2R	7–5, 6–4	88

== Notes ==
Awards
Preceded by (France) Kristina Mladenovic	ITF Junior World Champion; 2010	Succeeded by (Russia) Irina Khromacheva
Preceded by (Switzerland) Belinda Bencic	WTA Newcomer of the Year; 2015	Succeeded by (Japan) Naomi Osaka
