= 2015 US Open – Girls' doubles =

Girls' doubles
- 2015 US Open

Final
- Champions: (Slovakia) Viktória Kužmová (Russia) Aleksandra Pospelova
- Runners-up: (Russia) Anna Kalinskaya (Russia) Anastasia Potapova
- Score: 7–5, 6–2

Events
| Singles | men | women | | boys | girls |
| Doubles | men | women | mixed | boys | girls |
| WC Singles | men | women | quad |
| WC Doubles | men | women | quad |
| Legends | men | women | mixed |
- US Open

İpek Soylu and Jil Teichmann were the defending champions, but they chose not to participate.
Viktória Kužmová and Aleksandra Pospelova won the title, defeating Anna Kalinskaya and Anastasia Potapova in the final, 7–5, 6–2.

== Seeds ==
1. (Canada) Charlotte Robillard-Millette / (United Kingdom) Katie Swan (first round, withdrew)
2. (Hungary) Dalma Gálfi / (Hungary) Fanny Stollár (first round)
3. (Belarus) Vera Lapko / (Slovakia) Tereza Mihalíková (second round)
4. (Russia) Anna Blinkova / (Russia) Olesya Pervushina (quarterfinals)
5. (United States) Francesca Di Lorenzo / (Brazil) Luisa Stefani (semifinals)
6. (United States) Michaela Gordon / (United States) Claire Liu (first round, withdrew)
7. (Japan) Chihiro Muramatsu / (China) Zheng Wushuang (first round)
8. (United States) Usue Maitane Arconada / (United Kingdom) Maia Lumsden (quarterfinals)

== Draw ==
Key

- Q = Qualifier
- WC = Wild card
- LL = Lucky loser
- Alt = Alternate
- ITF = ITF entry
- PR = Protected ranking
- SR = Special ranking
- SE = Special exempt
- JE = Junior exempt
- JR = Junior Accelerator Programme entrant
- CO = College Accelerator Programme entrant
- NG = Next Gen Accelerator Program entrant
- w/o = Walkover
- r = Retired
- d = Defaulted

=== Finals ===
Semifinals
(Slovakia) Viktória Kužmová (Russia) Aleksandra Pospelova | 6 | 6^{5} | [10]
5 | (United States) Francesca Di Lorenzo (Brazil) Luisa Stefani | 4 | 7^{7} | [5]
(Russia) Anna Kalinskaya (Russia) Anastasia Potapova | 6 | 6
(Australia) Kimberly Birrell (Australia) Maddison Inglis | 2 | 1

Final
(Slovakia) Viktória Kužmová (Russia) Aleksandra Pospelova | 7 | 6
(Russia) Anna Kalinskaya (Russia) Anastasia Potapova | 5 | 2

=== Top half ===
First round
1 | (Canada) Charlotte Robillard-Millette (United Kingdom) Katie Swan
(United States) Carson Branstine (United States) Kelly Chen | w/o
(Germany) Katharina Hobgarski (Belarus) Iryna Shymanovich | w/o
(Canada) Bianca Andreescu (Canada) Katherine Sebov
(Russia) Elena Rybakina (Russia) Valeriya Zeleva | 6 | 4 | [1]
(Australia) Destanee Aiava (Australia) Olivia Tjandramulia | 3 | 6 | [10]
(Slovakia) Viktória Kužmová (Russia) Aleksandra Pospelova | w/o
6 | (United States) Michaela Gordon (United States) Claire Liu
4 | (Russia) Anna Blinkova (Russia) Olesya Pervushina | 6 | 6
WC | (United States) Kylie McKenzie (United States) Alexandra Sanford | 4 | 4
(Indonesia) Deria Nur Haliza (Romania) Ioana Diana Pietroiu | 0 | 5
(France) Tessah Andrianjafitrimo (Australia) Naiktha Bains | 6 | 7
(Poland) Magdalena Fręch (Greece) Valentini Grammatikopoulou | 2 | 6 | [8]
(Russia) Evgeniya Levashova (Switzerland) Rebeka Masarova | 6 | 3 | [10]
WC | (United States) Hurricane Tyra Black (United States) Caty McNally | 2 | 6 | [3]
5 | (United States) Francesca Di Lorenzo (Brazil) Luisa Stefani | 6 | 4 | [10]

Second round
(United States) C Branstine (United States) K Chen | 3 | 0
(Germany) K Hobgarski (Belarus) I Shymanovich | 6 | 6
(Australia) D Aiava (Australia) O Tjandramulia | 4 | 2
(Slovakia) V Kužmová (Russia) A Pospelova | 6 | 6
4 | (Russia) A Blinkova (Russia) O Pervushina | 6 | 1 | [10]
(France) T Andrianjafitrimo (Australia) N Bains | 3 | 6 | [6]
(Russia) E Levashova (Switzerland) R Masarova | 4 | 4
5 | (United States) F Di Lorenzo (Brazil) L Stefani | 6 | 6

Quarterfinals
(Germany) K Hobgarski (Belarus) I Shymanovich | 2 | 2
(Slovakia) V Kužmová (Russia) A Pospelova | 6 | 6
4 | (Russia) A Blinkova (Russia) O Pervushina | 6^{6} | 7^{7} | [7]
5 | (United States) F Di Lorenzo (Brazil) L Stefani | 7^{8} | 6^{5} | [10]

Semifinals
(Slovakia) V Kužmová (Russia) A Pospelova | 6 | 6^{5} | [10]
5 | (United States) F Di Lorenzo (Brazil) L Stefani | 4 | 7^{7} | [5]

=== Bottom half ===
First round
7 | (Japan) Chihiro Muramatsu (China) Zheng Wushuang | 3 | 3
(United Kingdom) Emily Arbuthnott (Denmark) Emilie Francati | 6 | 6
(Mexico) Jessica Hinojosa Gómez (India) Pranjala Yadlapalli | 1 | 0
(United States) Tornado Alicia Black (United States) Ingrid Neel | 6 | 6
WC | (United States) Amanda Anisimova (United States) Abigail Desiatnikov | 1 | 1
(Russia) Anna Kalinskaya (Russia) Anastasia Potapova | 6 | 6
(Algeria) Inès Ibbou (Ukraine) Katarina Zavatska | 4 | 1
3 | (Belarus) Vera Lapko (Slovakia) Tereza Mihalíková | 6 | 6
8 | (United States) Usue Maitane Arconada (United Kingdom) Maia Lumsden | 6 | 6
(Paraguay) Ana Paula Neffa de los Ríos (Italy) Beatrice Torelli | 3 | 0
WC | (United States) Ann Li (United States) Natasha Subhash | 4 | 6 | [8]
Alt | (Colombia) María Fernanda Herazo (Colombia) Yuliana Monroy | 6 | 1 | [10]
(Australia) Kimberly Birrell (Australia) Maddison Inglis | 6 | 7
(Greece) Eleni Christofi (India) Karman Thandi | 3 | 5
(United States) Kayla Day (United States) Sofia Kenin | 6 | 6
2 | (Hungary) Dalma Gálfi (Hungary) Fanny Stollár | 2 | 3

Second round
(United Kingdom) E Arbuthnott (Denmark) E Francati | 7 | 6
(United States) TA Black (United States) I Neel | 5 | 3
(Russia) A Kalinskaya (Russia) A Potapova | 3 | 7 | [10]
3 | (Belarus) V Lapko (Slovakia) T Mihalíková | 6 | 5 | [7]
8 | (United States) UM Arconada (United Kingdom) M Lumsden | 6 | 7^{7}
Alt | (Colombia) MF Herazo (Colombia) Y Monroy | 1 | 6^{1}
(Australia) K Birrell (Australia) M Inglis | 6 | 7
(United States) K Day (United States) S Kenin | 2 | 5

Quarterfinals
(United Kingdom) E Arbuthnott (Denmark) E Francati | 1 | 7^{7} | [7]
(Russia) A Kalinskaya (Russia) A Potapova | 6 | 6^{2} | [10]
8 | (United States) UM Arconada (United Kingdom) M Lumsden | 7^{3} | 7^{7} | [6]
(Australia) K Birrell (Australia) M Inglis | 7^{7} | 6^{1} | [10]

Semifinals
(Russia) A Kalinskaya (Russia) A Potapova | 6 | 6
(Australia) K Birrell (Australia) M Inglis | 2 | 1
