= 2017 US Open – Girls' doubles =

Girls' doubles
- 2017 US Open

Final
- Champions: (Serbia) Olga Danilović (Ukraine) Marta Kostyuk
- Runners-up: (Croatia) Lea Bošković (China) Wang Xiyu
- Score: 6–1, 7–5

Events
| Singles | men | women | | boys | girls |
| Doubles | men | women | mixed | boys | girls |
| WC Singles | men | women | quad |
| WC Doubles | men | women | quad |
| Legends | men | women | mixed |
- US Open

Jada Hart and Ena Shibahara were the defending champions, but both players were ineligible to participate.

Olga Danilović and Marta Kostyuk won the title, defeating Lea Bošković and Wang Xiyu in the final, 6–1, 7–5.

== Seeds ==
1. (Serbia) Olga Danilović / (Ukraine) Marta Kostyuk (champions)
2. (Canada) Carson Branstine / (United States) Sofia Sewing (second round)
3. (United States) Caty McNally / (United States) Whitney Osuigwe (first round)
4. (Chinese Taipei) Liang En-shuo / (China) Wang Xinyu (semifinals)
5. (Russia) Anastasia Kharitonova / (Russia) Elena Rybakina (first round)
6. (United Kingdom) Emily Appleton / (Colombia) Emiliana Arango (quarterfinals)
7. (Russia) Sofya Lansere / (Russia) Kamilla Rakhimova (semifinals)
8. (United States) Elysia Bolton / (United States) Ann Li (quarterfinals)

== Draw ==
Key

- Q = Qualifier
- WC = Wild card
- LL = Lucky loser
- Alt = Alternate
- ITF = ITF entry
- PR = Protected ranking
- SR = Special ranking
- SE = Special exempt
- JE = Junior exempt
- JR = Junior Accelerator Programme entrant
- CO = College Accelerator Programme entrant
- NG = Next Gen Accelerator Program entrant
- w/o = Walkover
- r = Retired
- d = Defaulted

=== Finals ===
Semifinals
1 | (Serbia) Olga Danilović (Ukraine) Marta Kostyuk | 6 | 7^{7}
7 | (Russia) Sofya Lansere (Russia) Kamilla Rakhimova | 4 | 6^{3}
4 | (Chinese Taipei) Liang En-shuo (China) Wang Xinyu | 6^{3} | 2
(Croatia) Lea Bošković (China) Wang Xiyu | 7^{7} | 6

Final
1 | (Serbia) Olga Danilović (Ukraine) Marta Kostyuk | 6 | 7
(Croatia) Lea Bošković (China) Wang Xiyu | 1 | 5

=== Top half ===
First round
1 | (Serbia) Olga Danilović (Ukraine) Marta Kostyuk | 6^{4} | 6 | [10]
(United States) Taylor Johnson (Mexico) María José Portillo Ramírez | 7^{7} | 3 | [8]
WC | (United States) Elizabeth Mandlik (United States) Natasha Subhash | 2 | 5
(Chinese Taipei) Chen Pei-hsuan (Japan) Naho Sato | 6 | 7
WC | (United States) Charlotte Owensby (United States) Gabriella Price | 5 | 3
(Ukraine) Viktoriia Dema (Romania) Mihaela Lorena Mărculescu | 7 | 6
(Italy) Monica Cappelletti (Italy) Elisabetta Cocciaretto | 5 | 4
6 | (United Kingdom) Emily Appleton (Colombia) Emiliana Arango | 7 | 6
3 | (United States) Caty McNally (United States) Whitney Osuigwe | 4 | 1
(Poland) Maja Chwalińska (Poland) Ania Hertel | 6 | 6
(Colombia) Sofía Múnera Sánchez (Burundi) Sada Nahimana | 6 | 6
(India) Mahak Jain (India) Mihika Yadav | 3 | 2
(Switzerland) Lulu Sun (Switzerland) Simona Waltert | 4 | 1
(United Kingdom) Ali Collins (Germany) Jule Niemeier | 6 | 6
WC | (United States) Abigail Forbes (United States) Coco Gauff | 6^{5} | 7^{7} | [7]
7 | (Russia) Sofya Lansere (Russia) Kamilla Rakhimova | 7^{7} | 6^{4} | [10]

Second round
1 | (Serbia) O Danilović (Ukraine) M Kostyuk | 6 | 6
(Chinese Taipei) P-h Chen (Japan) N Sato | 4 | 1
(Ukraine) V Dema (Romania) ML Mărculescu | 2 | 0
6 | (United Kingdom) E Appleton (Colombia) E Arango | 6 | 6
(Poland) M Chwalińska (Poland) A Hertel | 6 | 6
(Colombia) S Múnera Sánchez (Burundi) S Nahimana | 4 | 2
(United Kingdom) A Collins (Germany) J Niemeier | 1 | 4
7 | (Russia) S Lansere (Russia) K Rakhimova | 6 | 6

Quarterfinals
1 | (Serbia) O Danilović (Ukraine) M Kostyuk | 6 | 6
6 | (United Kingdom) E Appleton (Colombia) E Arango | 3 | 3
(Poland) M Chwalińska (Poland) A Hertel | 3 | 5
7 | (Russia) S Lansere (Russia) K Rakhimova | 6 | 7

Semifinals
1 | (Serbia) O Danilović (Ukraine) M Kostyuk | 6 | 7^{7}
7 | (Russia) S Lansere (Russia) K Rakhimova | 4 | 6^{3}

=== Bottom half ===
First round
8 | (United States) Elysia Bolton (United States) Ann Li | 6 | 7
(Colombia) Camila Osorio (Brazil) Thaisa Grana Pedretti | 4 | 5
(Japan) Mai Hontama (Japan) Anri Nagata | 3 | 6 | [13]
(United States) Hurricane Tyra Black (Ukraine) Anna Laguza | 6 | 3 | [11]
(Russia) Alina Charaeva (Russia) Daria Frayman | 6^{5} | 5
(Russia) Anzhelika Isaeva (Serbia) Draginja Vuković | 7^{7} | 7
(Spain) Paula Arias Manjón (Spain) Eva Guerrero Álvarez | 5 | 2
4 | (Chinese Taipei) Liang En-shuo (China) Wang Xinyu | 7 | 6
5 | (Russia) Anastasia Kharitonova (Russia) Elena Rybakina | 7 | 4 | [9]
(Japan) Yuki Naito (Latvia) Daniela Vismane | 5 | 6 | [11]
(Argentina) María Lourdes Carlé (Canada) Layne Sleeth | 2 | 6 | [10]
WC | (United States) Angelica Blake (United States) Nikki Redelijk | 6 | 4 | [8]
(Croatia) Lea Bošković (China) Wang Xiyu | 6 | 3 | [14]
(United States) Hailey Baptiste (United States) Nicole Mossmer | 2 | 6 | [12]
(Ukraine) Margaryta Bilokin (Slovakia) Viktória Morvayová | 6 | 3 | [6]
2 | (Canada) Carson Branstine (United States) Sofia Sewing | 4 | 6 | [10]

Second round
8 | (United States) E Bolton (United States) A Li | 6 | 6
(Japan) M Hontama (Japan) A Nagata | 2 | 3
(Russia) A Isaeva (Serbia) D Vuković
4 | (Chinese Taipei) E-s Liang (China) Xin Wang | w/o
(Japan) Y Naito (Latvia) D Vismane | 6 | 7
(Argentina) ML Carlé (Canada) L Sleeth | 1 | 5
(Croatia) L Bošković (China) Xiy Wang | 6 | 6
2 | (Canada) C Branstine (United States) S Sewing | 3 | 2

Quarterfinals
8 | (United States) E Bolton (United States) A Li | 7^{7} | 4 | [8]
4 | (Chinese Taipei) E-s Liang (China) Xin Wang | 6^{5} | 6 | [10]
(Japan) Y Naito (Latvia) D Vismane | 2 | 4
(Croatia) L Bošković (China) Xiy Wang | 6 | 6

Semifinals
4 | (Chinese Taipei) E-s Liang (China) Xin Wang | 6^{3} | 2
(Croatia) L Bošković (China) Xiy Wang | 7^{7} | 6
