= 2016 US Open – Girls' singles =

Girls' singles
- 2016 US Open

Final
- Champion: (United States) Kayla Day
- Runner-up: (Slovakia) Viktória Kužmová
- Score: 6–3, 6–2

Events
Singles	men	women		boys	girls
Doubles	men	women	mixed	boys	girls
WC Singles	men	women	quad
WC Doubles	men	women	quad
Legends	men	women	mixed
- US Open

Dalma Gálfi was the defending champion, but was no longer eligible to compete.

Kayla Day won the title, defeating Viktória Kužmová in the final, 6–3, 6–2.

== Seeds ==
1. (Russia) Anastasia Potapova (quarterfinals)
2. (Russia) Olesya Pervushina (second round)
3. (Switzerland) Rebeka Masarova (withdrew)
4. (United States) Amanda Anisimova (third round)
5. (United States) Kayla Day (champion)
6. (Russia) Amina Anshba (first round)
7. (Canada) Bianca Andreescu (semifinals)
8. (United States) Sofia Kenin (semifinals)
9. (United States) Usue Maitane Arconada (third round)
10. (United States) Claire Liu (second round)
11. (Serbia) Olga Danilović (first round, retired)
12. (Ukraine) Katarina Zavatska (first round)
13. (Slovakia) Viktória Kužmová (final)
14. (Slovenia) Kaja Juvan (first round)
15. (Japan) Yuki Naito (third round)
16. (United States) Alexandra Sanford (third round)

== Main draw ==
Key

- Q = Qualifier
- WC = Wild card
- LL = Lucky loser
- Alt = Alternate
- ITF = ITF entry
- PR = Protected ranking
- SR = Special ranking
- SE = Special exempt
- JE = Junior exempt
- JR = Junior Accelerator Programme entrant
- CO = College Accelerator Programme entrant
- NG = Next Gen Accelerator Program entrant
- w/o = Walkover
- r = Retired
- d = Defaulted

=== Finals ===
Quarterfinals
1	(Russia) Anastasia Potapova	3	6^{0}
8	(United States) Sofia Kenin	6	7^{7}
13	(Slovakia) Viktória Kužmová	7	6
(France) Tessah Andrianjafitrimo	5	4
7	(Canada) Bianca Andreescu	6	6
LL	(United States) Vanessa Ong	4	2
5	(United States) Kayla Day	6	6
WC	(United States) Carson Branstine	2	3

Semifinals
8	(United States) Sofia Kenin	7^{7}	5	6^{3}
13	(Slovakia) Viktória Kužmová	6^{2}	7	7^{7}
7	(Canada) Bianca Andreescu	7	1	2
5	(United States) Kayla Day	5	6	6

Final
13	(Slovakia) Viktória Kužmová	3	2
5	(United States) Kayla Day	6	6

=== Top half ===
==== Section 1 ====
First round
1	(Russia) Anastasia Potapova	7^{7}	5	6
(United States) Maria Mateas	6^{4}	7	1
WC	(United States) Nicole Mossmer	6	6
(Paraguay) Lara Escauriza	1	3
WC	(United States) Caroline Dolehide	5	7	5
(United Kingdom) Katie Swan	7	5	7
SE	(China) Wang Xiyu	6	6
14	(Slovenia) Kaja Juvan	4	1
12	(Ukraine) Katarina Zavatska	6	4	3
WC	(United States) Natasha Subhash	2	6	6
(Czech Republic) Lucie Kaňková	3	2
Q	(United States) Ashley Lahey	6	6
(Argentina) María Lourdes Carlé	1	3
(Austria) Mira Antonitsch	6	6
(Japan) Mai Hontama	5	2
8	(United States) Sofia Kenin	7	6

Second round
1	(Russia) A Potapova	6	6
WC	(United States) N Mossmer	3	3
(United Kingdom) K Swan	6	7
SE	(China) X Wang	2	5
WC	(United States) N Subhash	2	3
Q	(United States) A Lahey	6	6
(Austria) M Antonitsch	4	1
8	(United States) S Kenin	6	6

Third round
1	(Russia) A Potapova	6	6
(United Kingdom) K Swan	4	1
Q	(United States) A Lahey	6	6^{1}	3
8	(United States) S Kenin	4	7^{7}	6

Quarterfinals
1	(Russia) A Potapova	3	6^{0}
8	(United States) S Kenin	6	7^{7}

==== Section 2 ====
First round
4	(United States) Amanda Anisimova	6	6
(Spain) Eva Guerrero Álvarez	1	4
(Japan) Chihiro Muramatsu	6	6
(Italy) Federica Bilardo	3	0
WC	(United States) Whitney Osuigwe	4	4
(Poland) Iga Świątek	6	6
(Russia) Varvara Gracheva	0	3
13	(Slovakia) Viktória Kužmová	6	6
10	(United States) Claire Liu	6	6
(Switzerland) Ylena In-Albon	1	3
(France) Tessah Andrianjafitrimo	3	6	7
(Romania) Ioana Mincă	6	4	5
Q	(Germany) Irina Cantos Siemers	6	6
(United States) Morgan Coppoc	2	4
(United States) Taylor Johnson	2	7	6
6	(Russia) Amina Anshba	6	5	4

Second round
4	(United States) A Anisimova	6	6
(Japan) C Muramatsu	3	2
(Poland) I Świątek	2	2
13	(Slovakia) V Kužmová	6	6
10	(United States) C Liu	6	4	1
(France) T Andrianjafitrimo	2	6	6
Q	(Germany) I Cantos Siemers	4	4
(United States) T Johnson	6	6

Third round
4	(United States) A Anisimova	2	6	4
13	(Slovakia) V Kužmová	6	4	6
(France) T Andrianjafitrimo	6	6
(United States) T Johnson	2	2

Quarterfinals
13	(Slovakia) V Kužmová	7	6
(France) T Andrianjafitrimo	5	4

=== Bottom half ===
==== Section 3 ====
First round
7	(Canada) Bianca Andreescu	6	0
(United States) Caty McNally	3	1^{r}
Q	(United States) Hailey Baptiste	7^{7}	2	6
(Czech Republic) Johana Marková	6^{5}	6	2
(Japan) Ayumi Miyamoto	6	6
(United Kingdom) Emily Appleton	4	3
Q	(Russia) Marta Paigina	2	5
9	(United States) Usue Maitane Arconada	6	7
16	(United States) Alexandra Sanford	6^{5}	6	6
(Sweden) Mirjam Björklund	7^{7}	3	3
Q	(India) Pranjala Yadlapalli	2	6	6
(Poland) Wiktoria Kulik	6	3	2
(Norway) Malene Helgø	6	3
(Russia) Elena Rybakina	2	0^{r}
WC	(United States) Nicole Frenkel	3	7	4
LL	(United States) Vanessa Ong	6	5	6

Second round
7	(Canada) B Andreescu	6	6
Q	(United States) H Baptiste	2	3
(Japan) A Miyamoto	6^{2}	6^{3}
9	(United States) UM Arconada	7^{7}	7^{7}
16	(United States) A Sanford	5	7	6
Q	(India) P Yadlapalli	7	5	2
(Norway) M Helgø	4	4
LL	(United States) V Ong	6	6

Third round
7	(Canada) B Andreescu	5	7	6
9	(United States) UM Arconada	7	5	3
16	(United States) A Sanford	3	2
LL	(United States) V Ong	6	6

Quarterfinals
7	(Canada) B Andreescu	6	6
LL	(United States) V Ong	4	2

==== Section 4 ====
First round
5	(United States) Kayla Day	6	7
(China) Zheng Wushuang	1	5
Q	(Israel) Shelly Krolitzky	6	6
WC	(United States) Abigail Desiatnikov	2	1
Q	(United States) Kylie McKenzie	6	6
(Ukraine) Anastasia Zarytska	3	1
(Spain) Paula Arias Manjón	3	7^{7}	0
11	(Serbia) Olga Danilović	6	6^{3}	0^{r}
15	(Japan) Yuki Naito	6	6
(Italy) Tatiana Pieri	4	3
WC	(United States) Ann Li	6	1	4
Q	(Poland) Daria Kuczer	4	6	6
WC	(United States) Carson Branstine	6	6
(Peru) Dominique Schaefer	1	4
(Hungary) Panna Udvardy	6	3	4
2	(Russia) Olesya Pervushina	4	6	6

Second round
5	(United States) K Day	6	6
Q	(Israel) S Krolitzky	4	3
Q	(United States) K McKenzie	6	6
(Spain) P Arias Manjón	2	2
15	(Japan) Y Naito	6	6
Q	(Poland) D Kuczer	4	4
WC	(United States) C Branstine	2	7^{9}	6
2	(Russia) O Pervushina	6	6^{7}	4

Third round
5	(United States) K Day	6	6
Q	(United States) K McKenzie	3	2
15	(Japan) Y Naito	4	1
WC	(United States) C Branstine	6	6

Quarterfinals
5	(United States) K Day	6	6
WC	(United States) C Branstine	2	3

== Qualifying ==
=== Seeds ===
1. (Russia) Marta Paigina (qualified)
2. (China) Du Zhima (qualifying competition)
3. (Chinese Taipei) Cho I-hsuan (qualifying competition)
4. (Italy) Federica Bilardo (withdrew)
5. (China) Cao Siqi (first round)
6. (United States) Ellie Douglas (first round)
7. (Sweden) Ida Jarlskog (first round)
8. (Italy) Ludmilla Samsonova (first round)
9. (United States) Kylie McKenzie (qualified)
10. (United States) Ashley Lahey (qualified)
11. (Japan) Mayuka Aikawa (first round)
12. (India) Pranjala Yadlapalli (qualified)
13. (Israel) Shelly Krolitzky (qualified)
14. (Germany) Irina Cantos Siemers (qualified)
15. (Italy) Lucrezia Stefanini (qualifying competition)
16. (United States) Hurricane Tyra Black (first round)

=== Qualifiers ===
1. (Russia) Marta Paigina
2. (United States) Ashley Lahey
3. (United States) Kylie McKenzie
4. (India) Pranjala Yadlapalli
5. (Israel) Shelly Krolitzky
6. (Germany) Irina Cantos Siemers
7. (United States) Hailey Baptiste
8. (Poland) Daria Kuczer

=== Lucky loser ===
1. (United States) Vanessa Ong

=== Draw ===
==== First qualifier ====
First round
1	(Russia) Marta Paigina	6	6
(Mexico) María José Portillo Ramírez	2	1
WC	(United States) Katie Volynets	1	2
15	(Italy) Lucrezia Stefanini	6	6

Qualifying competition
1	(Russia) Marta Paigina	6	6
15	(Italy) Lucrezia Stefanini	2	3

==== Second qualifier ====
First round
2	(China) Du Zhima	6^{5}	6	7
WC	(United States) Alexa Noel	7^{7}	4	5
(Czech Republic) Michaela Bayerlová	3	2
10	(United States) Ashley Lahey	6	6

Qualifying competition
2	(China) Du Zhima	6	2	0
10	(United States) Ashley Lahey	3	6	6

==== Third qualifier ====
First round
3	(Chinese Taipei) Cho I-hsuan	6	3	6
(Ecuador) Camila Romero	1	6	2
(China) Ren Jiaqi	4	4
9	(United States) Kylie McKenzie	6	6

Qualifying competition
3	(Chinese Taipei) Cho I-hsuan	0	2
9	(United States) Kylie McKenzie	6	6

==== Fourth qualifier ====
First round
Alt	(United States) Kariann Pierre-Louis	7	3	6
WC	(Japan) Eri Shimizu	5	6	3
(United States) Victoria Emma	3	2
12	(India) Pranjala Yadlapalli	6	6

Qualifying competition
Alt	(United States) Kariann Pierre-Louis	4	4
12	(India) Pranjala Yadlapalli	6	6

==== Fifth qualifier ====
First round
5	(China) Cao Siqi	1	2
WC	(United States) Vanessa Ong	6	6
(Ecuador) Rafaella Baquerizo	4	0
13	(Israel) Shelly Krolitzky	6	6

Qualifying competition
WC	(United States) Vanessa Ong	4	5
13	(Israel) Shelly Krolitzky	6	7

==== Sixth qualifier ====
First round
6	(United States) Ellie Douglas	5	2
(Tunisia) Chiraz Bechri	7	6
(Italy) Maria Vittoria Viviani	1	6^{5}
14	(Germany) Irina Cantos Siemers	6	7^{7}

Qualifying competition
(Tunisia) Chiraz Bechri	6	4	1
14	(Germany) Irina Cantos Siemers	4	6	6

==== Seventh qualifier ====
First round
7	(Sweden) Ida Jarlskog	4	3
WC	(United States) Dalayna Hewitt	6	6
WC	(United States) Hailey Baptiste	6	6
11	(Japan) Mayuka Aikawa	3	2

Qualifying competition
WC	(United States) Dalayna Hewitt	7^{7}	2	3
WC	(United States) Hailey Baptiste	6^{4}	6	6

==== Eighth qualifier ====
First round
8	(Italy) Ludmilla Samsonova	2	6	4
(Poland) Daria Kuczer	6	4	6
(Russia) Vlada Koval	4	6	6
16	(United States) Hurricane Tyra Black	6	2	1

Qualifying competition
(Poland) Daria Kuczer	6	6
(Russia) Vlada Koval	2	1
