= 2017 US Open – Girls' singles =

Girls' singles
- 2017 US Open

Final
- Champion: (United States) Amanda Anisimova
- Runner-up: (United States) Coco Gauff
- Score: 6–0, 6–2

Events
| Singles | men | women | | boys | girls |
| Doubles | men | women | mixed | boys | girls |
| WC Singles | men | women | quad |
| WC Doubles | men | women | quad |
| Legends | men | women | mixed |
- US Open

Amanda Anisimova won the title, defeating Coco Gauff in the final, 6–0, 6–2.

Kayla Day was the defending champion, but chose to compete in the women's singles competition after receiving a main-draw wildcard. She lost to Shelby Rogers in the first round.

== Seeds ==
1. (United States) Whitney Osuigwe (second round)
2. (Ukraine) Marta Kostyuk (second round)
3. (Russia) Elena Rybakina (quarterfinals)
4. (United States) Amanda Anisimova (champion)
5. (Canada) Carson Branstine (second round)
6. (China) Wang Xinyu (second round)
7. (United States) Taylor Johnson (first round)
8. (Serbia) Olga Danilović (quarterfinals)
9. (United States) Sofia Sewing (first round)
10. (Switzerland) Simona Waltert (third round)
11. (United States) Ann Li (first round)
12. (Colombia) Camila Osorio (second round)
13. (United Kingdom) Emily Appleton (first round)
14. (Japan) Mai Hontama (first round)
15. (Russia) Sofya Lansere (third round)
16. (Chinese Taipei) Liang En-shuo (second round)

== Main draw ==
Key

- Q = Qualifier
- WC = Wild card
- LL = Lucky loser
- Alt = Alternate
- ITF = ITF entry
- PR = Protected ranking
- SR = Special ranking
- SE = Special exempt
- JE = Junior exempt
- JR = Junior Accelerator Programme entrant
- CO = College Accelerator Programme entrant
- NG = Next Gen Accelerator Program entrant
- w/o = Walkover
- r = Retired
- d = Defaulted

=== Finals ===
Quarterfinals
WC | (United States) Katie Volynets | 3 | 2
WC | (United States) Coco Gauff | 6 | 6
3 | (Russia) Elena Rybakina | 4 | 6 | 4
(Argentina) María Lourdes Carlé | 6 | 4 | 6
8 | (Serbia) Olga Danilović | 5 | 1
4 | (United States) Amanda Anisimova | 7 | 6
(Colombia) Emiliana Arango | 7^{7} | 6
(United States) Elysia Bolton | 6^{1} | 2

Semifinals
WC | (United States) Coco Gauff | 7 | 6
(Argentina) María Lourdes Carlé | 5 | 0
4 | (United States) Amanda Anisimova | 6 | 6
(Colombia) Emiliana Arango | 4 | 1

Final
WC | (United States) Coco Gauff | 0 | 2
4 | (United States) Amanda Anisimova | 6 | 6

=== Top half ===
==== Section 1 ====
First round
1 | (United States) Whitney Osuigwe | 6 | 6
Q | (Ukraine) Margaryta Bilokin | 1 | 4
(Russia) Anastasia Kharitonova | 6 | 6
(Chinese Taipei) Chen Pei-hsuan | 4 | 3
WC | (United States) Natasha Subhash | 3 | 6 | 6
(Brazil) Thaisa Grana Pedretti | 6 | 4 | 3
WC | (United States) Katie Volynets | 6 | 6
13 | (United Kingdom) Emily Appleton | 4 | 4
12 | (Colombia) Camila Osorio | 6 | 6^{5} | 6
(India) Zeel Desai | 4 | 7^{7} | 3
WC | (United States) Dalayna Hewitt | 4 | 6 | 6
Q | (Russia) Daria Frayman | 6 | 1 | 2
(Serbia) Draginja Vuković | 2 | 6^{4}
WC | (United States) Coco Gauff | 6 | 7^{7}
Q | (Poland) Maja Chwalińska | 6 | 3 | 4
5 | (Canada) Carson Branstine | 4 | 6 | 6

Second round
1 | (United States) W Osuigwe | 4 | 6 | 2
(Russia) A Kharitonova | 6 | 2 | 6
WC | (United States) N Subhash | 4 | 7^{7} | 1
WC | (United States) K Volynets | 6 | 6^{5} | 6
12 | (Colombia) C Osorio | 4 | 3
WC | (United States) D Hewitt | 6 | 6
WC | (United States) C Gauff | 6 | 6
5 | (Canada) C Branstine | 4 | 4

Third round
(Russia) A Kharitonova | 3 | 6^{4}
WC | (United States) K Volynets | 6 | 7^{7}
WC | (United States) D Hewitt | 4 | 3
WC | (United States) C Gauff | 6 | 6

Quarterfinals
WC | (United States) K Volynets | 3 | 2
WC | (United States) C Gauff | 6 | 6

==== Section 2 ====
First round
3 | (Russia) Elena Rybakina | 6 | 6^{6} | 6
(United States) Ellie Douglas | 3 | 7^{8} | 0
WC | (United States) Salma Ewing | 2 | 1
(China) Wang Xiyu | 6 | 6
(India) Mihika Yadav | 4 | 6 | 1
Q | (United States) Nikki Redelijk | 6 | 4 | 6
(Italy) Elisabetta Cocciaretto | 4 | 7^{7} | 7^{7}
14 | (Japan) Mai Hontama | 6 | 6^{4} | 6^{3}
10 | (Switzerland) Simona Waltert | 6 | 6
(Spain) Eva Guerrero Álvarez | 4 | 4
Q | (Ukraine) Viktoriia Dema | 3 | 1
(United States) Caty McNally | 6 | 6
(Slovakia) Viktória Morvayová | 6 | 2 | 6
(Germany) Jule Niemeier | 4 | 6 | 2
(Argentina) María Lourdes Carlé | 6 | 7
7 | (United States) Taylor Johnson | 3 | 5

Second round
3 | (Russia) E Rybakina | 7 | 6
(China) Xiy Wang | 5 | 1
Q | (United States) N Redelijk | 3 | 4
(Italy) E Cocciaretto | 6 | 6
10 | (Switzerland) S Waltert | 7^{7} | 6
(United States) C McNally | 6^{5} | 2
(Slovakia) V Morvayová | 2 | 2
(Argentina) ML Carlé | 6 | 6

Third round
3 | (Russia) E Rybakina | 6 | 6
(Italy) E Cocciaretto | 4 | 0
10 | (Switzerland) S Waltert | 2 | 2
(Argentina) ML Carlé | 6 | 6

Quarterfinals
3 | (Russia) E Rybakina | 4 | 6 | 4
(Argentina) ML Carlé | 6 | 4 | 6

=== Bottom half ===
==== Section 3 ====
First round
8 | (Serbia) Olga Danilović | 6 | 6
(Russia) Anzhelika Isaeva | 3 | 2
(United States) Hailey Baptiste | 6 | 5 | 4
(Croatia) Lea Bošković | 3 | 7 | 6
(Ukraine) Anna Laguza | 5 | 6^{1}
(Japan) Naho Sato | 7 | 7^{7}
(Switzerland) Lulu Sun | 3 | 7 | 6
11 | (United States) Ann Li | 6 | 5 | 4
16 | (Chinese Taipei) Liang En-shuo | 6 | 3 | 6
(Latvia) Daniela Vismane | 4 | 6 | 3
(United States) Victoria Flores | 4 | 6 | 4
Q | (Spain) Paula Arias Manjón | 6 | 4 | 6
WC | (United States) Abigail Forbes | 4 | 6^{4}
(Russia) Kamilla Rakhimova | 6 | 7^{7}
(Mexico) María José Portillo Ramírez | 3 | 3
4 | (United States) Amanda Anisimova | 6 | 6

Second round
8 | (Serbia) O Danilović | 7^{7} | 6
(Croatia) L Bošković | 6^{3} | 4
(Japan) N Sato | 6 | 6
(Switzerland) L Sun | 2 | 2
16 | (Chinese Taipei) E-s Liang | 6 | 6^{2} | 4
Q | (Spain) P Arias Manjón | 2 | 7^{7} | 6
(Russia) K Rakhimova | 2 | 2
4 | (United States) A Anisimova | 6 | 6

Third round
8 | (Serbia) O Danilović | 6 | 7
(Japan) N Sato | 0 | 5
Q | (Spain) P Arias Manjón | 3 | 2
4 | (United States) A Anisimova | 6 | 6

Quarterfinals
8 | (Serbia) O Danilović | 5 | 1
4 | (United States) A Anisimova | 7 | 6

==== Section 4 ====
First round
6 | (China) Wang Xinyu | 6 | 6^{5} | 6
(India) Mahak Jain | 3 | 7^{7} | 1
WC | (United States) Kelly Chen | 6 | 7^{7}
Q | (Italy) Monica Cappelletti | 2 | 6^{4}
(Colombia) Emiliana Arango | 3 | 7 | 6
SE | (Canada) Layne Sleeth | 6 | 5 | 1
(Russia) Alina Charaeva | 5 | 7^{7} | 7
9 | (United States) Sofia Sewing | 7 | 6^{3} | 5
15 | (Russia) Sofya Lansere | 6 | 7
(United States) Hurricane Tyra Black | 3 | 5
WC | (United States) Angelica Blake | 4 | 3
(Romania) Mihaela Lorena Mărculescu | 6 | 6
(Japan) Yuki Naito | 6^{4} | 3
(United States) Elysia Bolton | 7^{7} | 6
Q | (Burundi) Sada Nahimana | 6 | 0 | 0
2 | (Ukraine) Marta Kostyuk | 4 | 6 | 6

Second round
6 | (China) Xin Wang | 6 | 5 | 4
WC | (United States) K Chen | 3 | 7 | 6
(Colombia) E Arango | 6 | 6
(Russia) A Charaeva | 2 | 4
15 | (Russia) S Lansere | 6 | 6
(Romania) ML Mărculescu | 4 | 2
(United States) E Bolton | 7^{7} | 6
2 | (Ukraine) M Kostyuk | 6^{4} | 2

Third round
WC | (United States) K Chen | 6 | 1 | 2
(Colombia) E Arango | 4 | 6 | 6
15 | (Russia) S Lansere | 3 | 7 | 4
(United States) E Bolton | 6 | 5 | 6

Quarterfinals
(Colombia) E Arango | 7^{7} | 6
(United States) E Bolton | 6^{1} | 2

== Qualifying ==
=== Seeds ===
1. (Poland) Ania Hertel (qualifying competition)
2. (France) Yasmine Mansouri (first round)
3. (Colombia) Sofía Múnera Sánchez (first round)
4. (Spain) Paula Arias Manjón (qualified)
5. (United States) Nicole Mossmer (qualifying competition)
6. (Chinese Taipei) Cho I-hsuan (first round)
7. (United Kingdom) Ali Collins (qualifying competition)
8. (Denmark) Clara Tauson (first round)
9. (Ukraine) Viktoriia Dema (qualified)
10. (Papua New Guinea) Violet Apisah (qualifying competition)
11. (Poland) Maja Chwalińska (qualified)
12. (Japan) Anri Nagata (first round)
13. (Italy) Monica Cappelletti (qualified)
14. (Burundi) Sada Nahimana (qualified)
15. (Peru) Anastasia Iamachkine (first round)
16. (Russia) Daria Frayman (qualified)

=== Qualifiers ===
1. (Italy) Monica Cappelletti
2. (United States) Nikki Redelijk
3. (Ukraine) Margaryta Bilokin
4. (Spain) Paula Arias Manjón
5. (Russia) Daria Frayman
6. (Burundi) Sada Nahimana
7. (Ukraine) Viktoriia Dema
8. (Poland) Maja Chwalińska

=== Draw ===
==== First qualifier ====
First round
1 | (Poland) Ania Hertel | 7 | 6
WC | (United States) Gabriella Price | 5 | 3
WC | (Japan) Marina Kurosu | 1 | 4
13 | (Italy) Monica Cappelletti | 6 | 6

Qualifying competition
1 | (Poland) Ania Hertel | 7 | 2 | 0
13 | (Italy) Monica Cappelletti | 5 | 6 | 6

==== Second qualifier ====
First round
2 | (France) Yasmine Mansouri | 6 | 6^{4} | 1
(Switzerland) Sina Züger | 3 | 7^{7} | 6
WC | (United States) Nikki Redelijk | 6 | 6
15 | (Peru) Anastasia Iamachkine | 3 | 4

Qualifying competition
(Switzerland) Sina Züger | 5 | 6 | 4
WC | (United States) Nikki Redelijk | 7 | 4 | 6

==== Third qualifier ====
First round
3 | (Colombia) Sofía Múnera Sánchez | 3 | 4
(United States) Elizabeth Mandlik | 6 | 6
(Ukraine) Margaryta Bilokin | 6 | 6
12 | (Japan) Anri Nagata | 3 | 4

Qualifying competition
(United States) Elizabeth Mandlik | 2 | 1
(Ukraine) Margaryta Bilokin | 6 | 6

==== Fourth qualifier ====
First round
4 | (Spain) Paula Arias Manjón | 3 | 6 | 6
(United States) Lea Ma | 6 | 2 | 4
WC | (United States) Elvina Kalieva | 0 | 3
10 | (Papua New Guinea) Violet Apisah | 6 | 6

Qualifying competition
4 | (Spain) Paula Arias Manjón | 6^{2} | 6 | 6
10 | (Papua New Guinea) Violet Apisah | 7^{7} | 4 | 4

==== Fifth qualifier ====
First round
5 | (United States) Nicole Mossmer | 6 | 6
(Brazil) Vitória Okuyama | 0 | 0
(Netherlands) Lexie Stevens | 2 | 4
16 | (Russia) Daria Frayman | 6 | 6

Qualifying competition
5 | (United States) Nicole Mossmer | 7 | 3 | 3
16 | (Russia) Daria Frayman | 5 | 6 | 6

==== Sixth qualifier ====
First round
6 | (Chinese Taipei) Cho I-hsuan | 3 | 4
(Peru) Kianah Motosono | 6 | 6
(United States) Imani Graham | 1 | 2
14 | (Burundi) Sada Nahimana | 6 | 6

Qualifying competition
(Peru) Kianah Motosono | 2 | 3
14 | (Burundi) Sada Nahimana | 6 | 6

==== Seventh qualifier ====
First round
7 | (United Kingdom) Ali Collins | 4 | 6 | 6
WC | (United States) Alexandra Yepifanova | 6 | 4 | 4
(Japan) Sakura Hosogi | 4 | 6^{3}
9 | (Ukraine) Viktoriia Dema | 6 | 7^{7}

Qualifying competition
7 | (United Kingdom) Ali Collins | 1 | 3
9 | (Ukraine) Viktoriia Dema | 6 | 6

==== Eighth qualifier ====
First round
8 | (Denmark) Clara Tauson | 4 | 4
(Italy) Lisa Piccinetti | 6 | 6
WC | (United States) Charlotte Owensby | 1 | 0
11 | (Poland) Maja Chwalińska | 6 | 6

Qualifying competition
(Italy) Lisa Piccinetti | 4 | 1
11 | (Poland) Maja Chwalińska | 6 | 6
