= 2015 US Open – Girls' singles =

Girls' singles
- 2015 US Open

Final
- Champion: (Hungary) Dalma Gálfi
- Runner-up: (United States) Sofia Kenin
- Score: 7–5, 6–4

Events
Singles	men	women		boys	girls
Doubles	men	women	mixed	boys	girls
WC Singles	men	women	quad
WC Doubles	men	women	quad
Legends	men	women	mixed
- US Open

Marie Bouzková was the defending champion, but she chose not to participate. Dalma Gálfi won the title, defeating Sofia Kenin in the final, 7–5, 6–4.

== Seeds ==
1. (Czech Republic) Markéta Vondroušová (second round, retired)
2. (Hungary) Dalma Gálfi (champion)
3. (Russia) Anna Blinkova (second round)
4. (Slovakia) Tereza Mihalíková (third round)
5. (United Kingdom) Katie Swan (first round, retired)
6. (Russia) Anna Kalinskaya (first round)
7. (Canada) Charlotte Robillard-Millette (second round, retired)
8. (United States) Usue Maitane Arconada (third round)
9. (United States) Sofia Kenin (final)
10. (Russia) Sofya Zhuk (quarterfinals)
11. (Hungary) Fanny Stollár (semifinals)
12. (Brazil) Luisa Stefani (first round)
13. (Belarus) Vera Lapko (quarterfinals)
14. (China) Zheng Wushuang (second round)
15. (India) Pranjala Yadlapalli (first round)
16. (Germany) Katharina Hobgarski (first round)

== Main draw ==
Key

- Q = Qualifier
- WC = Wild card
- LL = Lucky loser
- Alt = Alternate
- ITF = ITF entry
- PR = Protected ranking
- SR = Special ranking
- SE = Special exempt
- JE = Junior exempt
- JR = Junior Accelerator Programme entrant
- CO = College Accelerator Programme entrant
- NG = Next Gen Accelerator Program entrant
- w/o = Walkover
- r = Retired
- d = Defaulted

=== Finals ===
Quarterfinals
13	(Belarus) Vera Lapko	6	0	0
9	(United States) Sofia Kenin	4	6	6
WC	(United States) Kylie McKenzie	2	6	3
11	(Hungary) Fanny Stollár	6	3	6
(Belarus) Iryna Shymanovich	7	5	2
(United States) Francesca Di Lorenzo	5	7	6
10	(Russia) Sofya Zhuk	6^{3}	1
2	(Hungary) Dalma Gálfi	7^{7}	6

Semifinals
9	(United States) Sofia Kenin	6	7
11	(Hungary) Fanny Stollár	4	5
(United States) Francesca Di Lorenzo	5	6^{1}
2	(Hungary) Dalma Gálfi	7	7^{7}

Final
9	(United States) Sofia Kenin	5	4
2	(Hungary) Dalma Gálfi	7	6

=== Top half ===
==== Section 1 ====
First round
1	(Czech Republic) Markéta Vondroušová	6	7
(Russia) Anastasia Potapova	4	5
WC	(United States) Abigail Desiatnikov	2	3
(Slovakia) Viktória Kužmová	6	6
WC	(United States) Alexa Graham	7	4	6
Q	(Ukraine) Katarina Zavatska	5	6	3
WC	(United States) Tornado Alicia Black	5	5^{r}
13	(Belarus) Vera Lapko	7	5
9	(United States) Sofia Kenin	6	6
Q	(Paraguay) Ana Paula Neffa de los Ríos	3	0
(Russia) Aleksandra Pospelova	6	6
(Canada) Katherine Sebov	4	1
WC	(United States) Kelly Chen	6	6
(Australia) Naiktha Bains	3	4
(France) Tessah Andrianjafitrimo	7^{7}	3
5	(United Kingdom) Katie Swan	6^{5}	0^{r}

Second round
1	(Czech Republic) M Vondroušová	1^{r}
(Slovakia) V Kužmová	4
WC	(United States) A Graham	2	1
13	(Belarus) V Lapko	6	6
9	(United States) S Kenin	6	7^{7}
(Russia) A Pospelova	4	6^{3}
WC	(United States) K Chen	1	1
(France) T Andrianjafitrimo	6	6

Third round
(Slovakia) V Kužmová	1	3
13	(Belarus) V Lapko	6	6
9	(United States) S Kenin	7	6
(France) T Andrianjafitrimo	5	4

Quarterfinals
13	(Belarus) V Lapko	6	0	0
9	(United States) S Kenin	4	6	6

==== Section 2 ====
First round
3	(Russia) Anna Blinkova	6	6
(Australia) Maddison Inglis	3	4
(Denmark) Emilie Francati	3	2
WC	(United States) Kylie McKenzie	6	6
(Poland) Magdalena Fręch	7	7^{7}
Q	(United States) Amanda Anisimova	5	6^{3}
Q	(Greece) Valentini Grammatikopoulou	7^{7}	6
15	(India) Pranjala Yadlapalli	6^{1}	3
11	(Hungary) Fanny Stollár	6	6
(Algeria) Inès Ibbou	3	2
(Italy) Beatrice Torelli	3	6	1
Q	(United States) Natasha Subhash	6	1	6
(Russia) Elena Rybakina	7^{7}	6
(United States) Claire Liu	6^{4}	2
(Australia) Olivia Tjandramulia	6^{7}	6	3
7	(Canada) Charlotte Robillard-Millette	7^{9}	3	6

Second round
3	(Russia) A Blinkova	1	4
WC	(United States) K McKenzie	6	6
(Poland) M Fręch	5	0
Q	(Greece) V Grammatikopoulou	7	6
11	(Hungary) F Stollár	6	6
Q	(United States) N Subhash	0	3
(Russia) E Rybakina	6	1
7	(Canada) C Robillard-Millette	2	0^{r}

Third round
WC	(United States) K McKenzie	7	6
Q	(Greece) V Grammatikopoulou	5	4
11	(Hungary) F Stollár	7^{7}	6
(Russia) E Rybakina	6^{4}	4

Quarterfinals
WC	(United States) K McKenzie	2	6	3
11	(Hungary) F Stollár	6	3	6

=== Bottom half ===
==== Section 3 ====
First round
6	(Russia) Anna Kalinskaya	6	4	1
(United Kingdom) Maia Lumsden	4	6	6
WC	(United States) Hurricane Tyra Black	3	3
Q	(Moldova) Anastasia Dețiuc	6	6
(United States) Raveena Kingsley	6	6
(Canada) Bianca Andreescu	1	1
(Belarus) Iryna Shymanovich	7	1	6
12	(Brazil) Luisa Stefani	5	6	1
14	(China) Zheng Wushuang	6	7^{7}
(Australia) Destanee Aiava	1	6^{5}
(United States) Francesca Di Lorenzo	6^{5}	7^{7}	6
(Russia) Olesya Pervushina	7^{7}	6^{1}	3
(United States) Michaela Gordon	7	6
(Switzerland) Rebeka Masarova	5	4
(United States) Kayla Day	5	6^{3}
4	(Slovakia) Tereza Mihalíková	7	7^{7}

Second round
(United Kingdom) M Lumsden	4	7^{7}	0
Q	(Moldova) A Dețiuc	6	6^{5}	6
(United States) R Kingsley	6	4	3
(Belarus) I Shymanovich	3	6	6
14	(China) W Zheng	2	3
(United States) F Di Lorenzo	6	6
(United States) M Gordon	3	3
4	(Slovakia) T Mihalíková	6	6

Third round
Q	(Moldova) A Dețiuc	4	5
(Belarus) I Shymanovich	6	7
(United States) F Di Lorenzo	7^{7}	6
4	(Slovakia) T Mihalíková	6^{4}	3

Quarterfinals
(Belarus) I Shymanovich	7	5	2
(United States) F Di Lorenzo	5	7	6

==== Section 4 ====
First round
8	(United States) Usue Maitane Arconada	6	6
(Russia) Valeriya Zeleva	2	0
(Japan) Chihiro Muramatsu	2	6	6
(Mexico) Jessica Hinojosa Gómez	6	2	2
WC	(United States) Caty McNally	2	5
(Australia) Kimberly Birrell	6	7
(Indonesia) Deria Nur Haliza	0	2
10	(Russia) Sofya Zhuk	6	6
16	(Germany) Katharina Hobgarski	3	6^{3}
SE	(India) Karman Thandi	6	7^{7}
(Russia) Evgeniya Levashova	6	6
Q	(United States) Carson Branstine	2	4
(United Kingdom) Emily Arbuthnott	7^{7}	3	6
(United States) Ingrid Neel	6^{2}	6	2
WC	(United States) Alexandra Sanford	7^{8}	3	5
2	(Hungary) Dalma Gálfi	6^{6}	6	7

Second round
8	(United States) UM Arconada	6	7
(Japan) C Muramatsu	2	5
(Australia) K Birrell	3	7	3
10	(Russia) S Zhuk	6	5	6
SE	(India) K Thandi	6	4	6
(Russia) E Levashova	2	6	3
(United Kingdom) E Arbuthnott	4	1
2	(Hungary) D Gálfi	6	6

Third round
8	(United States) UM Arconada	6	3	3
10	(Russia) S Zhuk	0	6	6
SE	(India) K Thandi	4	6^{3}
2	(Hungary) D Gálfi	6	7^{7}

Quarterfinals
10	(Russia) S Zhuk	6^{3}	1
2	(Hungary) D Gálfi	7^{7}	6

== Qualifying ==
=== Seeds ===
1. (Romania) Georgia Crăciun (first round)
2. (Colombia) María Fernanda Herazo (first round)
3. (Romania) Ioana Diana Pietroiu (qualifying competition)
4. (Moldova) Anastasia Dețiuc (qualified)
5. (Brazil) Thaisa Grana Pedretti (first round)
6. (Romania) Oana Gavrilă (first round)
7. (Australia) Maddison Inglis (qualified)
8. (China) Yuan Yue (qualifying competition)
9. (India) Mihika Yadav (first round)
10. (Japan) Mayuka Aikawa (first round)
11. (New Zealand) Jade Lewis (qualifying competition)
12. (Greece) Eleni Christofi (qualifying competition)
13. (Ukraine) Katarina Zavatska (qualified)
14. (Colombia) Yuliana Monroy (first round)
15. (United States) Maria Mateas (qualifying competition)
16. (Canada) Vanessa Wong (qualifying competition)

=== Qualifiers ===
1. (Greece) Valentini Grammatikopoulou
2. (United States) Amanda Anisimova
3. (United States) Carson Branstine
4. (Moldova) Anastasia Dețiuc
5. (Paraguay) Ana Paula Neffa de los Ríos
6. (United States) Natasha Subhash
7. (Australia) Maddison Inglis
8. (Ukraine) Katarina Zavatska

=== Draw ===
==== First qualifier ====
First round
1	(Romania) Georgia Crăciun	4	1
(Greece) Valentini Grammatikopoulou	6	6
(United States) Gabriella Pollner	6^{4}	1
16	(Canada) Vanessa Wong	7^{7}	6

Qualifying competition
(Greece) Valentini Grammatikopoulou	7^{7}	6
16	(Canada) Vanessa Wong	6^{2}	1

==== Second qualifier ====
First round
2	(Colombia) María Fernanda Herazo	1	2
WC	(United States) Amanda Anisimova	6	6
(China) Liu Yanni	1	2
15	(United States) Maria Mateas	6	6

Qualifying competition
WC	(United States) Amanda Anisimova	6	6
15	(United States) Maria Mateas	4	2

==== Third qualifier ====
First round
3	(Romania) Ioana Diana Pietroiu	6	6
(Colombia) Emiliana Arango	2	4
WC	(United States) Carson Branstine	7^{11}	5	6
10	(Japan) Mayuka Aikawa	6^{9}	7	2

Qualifying competition
3	(Romania) Ioana Diana Pietroiu	3	5
WC	(United States) Carson Branstine	6	7

==== Fourth qualifier ====
First round
4	(Moldova) Anastasia Dețiuc	6	4
(Brazil) Sophia Chow	2	2^{r}
WC	(United States) Whitney Osuigwe	5	2
11	(New Zealand) Jade Lewis	7	6

Qualifying competition
4	(Moldova) Anastasia Dețiuc	6	6
11	(New Zealand) Jade Lewis	3	1

==== Fifth qualifier ====
First round
5	(Brazil) Thaisa Grana Pedretti	3	2
(United States) Sofia Sewing	6	6
(Paraguay) Ana Paula Neffa de los Ríos	6	6
14	(Colombia) Yuliana Monroy	2	1

Qualifying competition
(United States) Sofia Sewing	4	6^{9}
(Paraguay) Ana Paula Neffa de los Ríos	6	7^{11}

==== Sixth qualifier ====
First round
6	(Romania) Oana Gavrilă	4	3
(United States) Olivia Hauger	6	6
WC	(United States) Natasha Subhash	6	6
9	(India) Mihika Yadav	4	2

Qualifying competition
(United States) Olivia Hauger	6	5	4
WC	(United States) Natasha Subhash	3	7	6

==== Seventh qualifier ====
First round
7	(Australia) Maddison Inglis	2	7^{7}	6
(United States) Mia Horvit	6	6^{5}	4
(Mexico) María José Portillo Ramírez	6	2	5
12	(Greece) Eleni Christofi	4	6	7

Qualifying competition
7	(Australia) Maddison Inglis	6	6
12	(Greece) Eleni Christofi	4	2

==== Eighth qualifier ====
First round
8	(China) Yuan Yue	6	6
WC	(Japan) Eri Shimizu	0	4
WC	(United States) Victoria Emma	1	4
13	(Ukraine) Katarina Zavatska	6	6

Qualifying competition
8	(China) Yuan Yue	4	7^{7}	3
13	(Ukraine) Katarina Zavatska	6	6^{5}	6
