= 2015 US Open – Wheelchair men's singles =

Wheelchair men's singles
- 2015 US Open

Final
- Champion: (Japan) Shingo Kunieda
- Runner-up: (France) Stéphane Houdet
- Score: 6–7^{(4–7)}, 6–3, 6–2

Events
Singles	men	women		boys	girls
Doubles	men	women	mixed	boys	girls
WC Singles	men	women	quad
WC Doubles	men	women	quad
Legends	men	women	mixed
← 2014 ·	US Open	· 2017 →

Defending champion Shingo Kunieda defeated Stéphane Houdet in the final, 6–7^{(4–7)}, 6–3, 6–2 to win the men's singles wheelchair tennis title at the 2015 US Open. It was his sixth US Open singles title and 20th major singles title overall.

== Seeds ==
1. (Japan) Shingo Kunieda (champion)
2. (France) Nicolas Peifer (semifinals)

== Draw ==
=== Key ===
- Q = Qualifier
- WC = Wild card
- LL = Lucky loser
- Alt = Alternate
- ITF = ITF entry
- PR = Protected ranking
- SR = Special ranking
- SE = Special exempt
- JE = Junior exempt
- JR = Junior Accelerator Programme entrant
- CO = College Accelerator Programme entrant
- NG = Next Gen Accelerator Program entrant
- w/o = Walkover
- r = Retired
- d = Defaulted

=== Bracket ===
Quarterfinals
1	(Japan) Shingo Kunieda	6	6
(United Kingdom) Gordon Reid	1	3
(Netherlands) Maikel Scheffers	0	0
(Belgium) Joachim Gérard	6	6
(France) Stéphane Houdet	6	6^{4}	6
(Argentina) Gustavo Fernández	1	7^{7}	2
(France) Michaël Jeremiasz	3	7^{9}	4
2	(France) Nicolas Peifer	6	6^{7}	6

Semifinals
1	(Japan) Shingo Kunieda	6	6
(Belgium) Joachim Gérard	4	1
(France) Stéphane Houdet	7^{7}	6
2	(France) Nicolas Peifer	6^{5}	2

Final
1	(Japan) Shingo Kunieda	6^{4}	6	6
(France) Stéphane Houdet	7^{7}	3	2
