= 2017 US Open – Men's champions invitational =

Men's champions invitational
- 2017 US Open

Final
- Champions: (United States) John McEnroe (United States) Patrick McEnroe
- Runners-up: (Australia) Pat Cash (France) Henri Leconte
- Score: 6–2, 6–4

Events
Singles	men	women		boys	girls
Doubles	men	women	mixed	boys	girls
WC Singles	men	women	quad
WC Doubles	men	women	quad
Legends	men	women	mixed
← 2016 ·	US Open	· 2018 →

Pat Cash and Mark Philippoussis were the two-time defending champions, but Philippoussis did not participate this year. Cash played alongside Henri Leconte, but lost to John and Patrick McEnroe in the final, 2–6, 4–6.

== Draw ==
=== Key ===
- Q = Qualifier
- WC = Wild card
- LL = Lucky loser
- Alt = Alternate
- ITF = ITF entry
- PR = Protected ranking
- SR = Special ranking
- SE = Special exempt
- JE = Junior exempt
- JR = Junior Accelerator Programme entrant
- CO = College Accelerator Programme entrant
- NG = Next Gen Accelerator Program entrant
- w/o = Walkover
- r = Retired
- d = Defaulted

=== Finals ===
Semifinals
(United States) John McEnroe (United States) Patrick McEnroe	6	6
(United States) Luke Jensen (United States) Murphy Jensen	1	2
(Australia) Pat Cash (France) Henri Leconte	3	7	[10]
(United States) Michael Chang (United States) Jan-Michael Gambill	6	5	[7]

Final
(United States) John McEnroe (United States) Patrick McEnroe	6	6
(Australia) Pat Cash (France) Henri Leconte	2	4
