= 2017 US Open – Wheelchair men's doubles =

Wheelchair men's doubles
- 2017 US Open

Final
- Champions: (United Kingdom) Alfie Hewett (United Kingdom) Gordon Reid
- Runners-up: (France) Stéphane Houdet (France) Nicolas Peifer
- Score: 7–5, 6–4

Events
Singles	men	women		boys	girls
Doubles	men	women	mixed	boys	girls
WC Singles	men	women	quad
WC Doubles	men	women	quad
Legends	men	women	mixed
← 2015 ·	US Open	· 2018 →

Defending champion Gordon Reid and his partner Alfie Hewett defeated the other two-time defending champion Stéphane Houdet and his partner Nicolas Peifer in the final, 7–5, 6–4 to win the men's doubles wheelchair tennis title at the 2017 US Open.

There was no edition of the event in 2016 due to a scheduling conflict with the 2016 Summer Paralympics.

== Seeds ==
1. (France) Stéphane Houdet / (France) Nicolas Peifer (final)
2. (United Kingdom) Alfie Hewett / (United Kingdom) Gordon Reid (champions)

== Draw ==
=== Key ===
- Q = Qualifier
- WC = Wild card
- LL = Lucky loser
- Alt = Alternate
- ITF = ITF entry
- PR = Protected ranking
- SR = Special ranking
- SE = Special exempt
- JE = Junior exempt
- JR = Junior Accelerator Programme entrant
- CO = College Accelerator Programme entrant
- NG = Next Gen Accelerator Program entrant
- w/o = Walkover
- r = Retired
- d = Defaulted

=== Bracket ===
Semifinals
1	(France) Stéphane Houdet (France) Nicolas Peifer	6	5	[10]
(Belgium) Joachim Gérard (Sweden) Stefan Olsson	3	7	[8]
(Argentina) Gustavo Fernández (Japan) Shingo Kunieda	3	2
2	(United Kingdom) Alfie Hewett (United Kingdom) Gordon Reid	6	6

Final
1	(France) Stéphane Houdet (France) Nicolas Peifer	5	4
2	(United Kingdom) Alfie Hewett (United Kingdom) Gordon Reid	7	6
