= 2017 US Open – Wheelchair quad doubles =

Wheelchair quad doubles
- 2017 US Open

Final
- Champions: (United Kingdom) Andrew Lapthorne (United States) David Wagner
- Runners-up: (Australia) Dylan Alcott (United States) Bryan Barten
- Score: 7–5, 6–2

Events
Singles	men	women		boys	girls
Doubles	men	women	mixed	boys	girls
WC Singles	men	women	quad
WC Doubles	men	women	quad
Legends	men	women	mixed
← 2015 ·	US Open	· 2018 →

Seven-time defending champion David Wagner and his partner Andrew Lapthorne defeated Dylan Alcott and Bryan Barten in the final, 7–5, 6–2 to win the quad doubles wheelchair tennis title at the 2017 US Open.

Nick Taylor and Wagner were the seven-time reigning champions, but Taylor did not participate this year.

The event was not held in 2016 due to a scheduling conflict with the 2016 Summer Paralympics.

== Draw ==
=== Key ===
- Q = Qualifier
- WC = Wild card
- LL = Lucky loser
- Alt = Alternate
- SE = Special exempt
- PR = Protected ranking
- ITF = ITF entry
- JE = Junior exempt
- w/o = Walkover
- r = Retired
- d = Defaulted
- SR = Special ranking

=== Final ===
Final
(United Kingdom) Andrew Lapthorne (United States) David Wagner	7	6
(Australia) Dylan Alcott (United States) Bryan Barten	5	2
