= 2015 US Open – Men's champions invitational =

Men's champions invitational
- 2015 US Open

Final
- Champions: (Australia) Pat Cash (Australia) Mark Philippoussis
- Runners-up: (United States) Michael Chang (United States) Todd Martin
- Score: 6–2, 6–1

Events
Singles	men	women		boys	girls
Doubles	men	women	mixed	boys	girls
WC Singles	men	women	quad
WC Doubles	men	women	quad
Legends	men	women	mixed
← 2014 ·	US Open	· 2016 →

Pat Cash and Mark Philippoussis won the title, defeating Michael Chang and Todd Martin in the final, 6–2, 6–1.

== Draw ==
=== Key ===
- Q = Qualifier
- WC = Wild card
- LL = Lucky loser
- Alt = Alternate
- ITF = ITF entry
- PR = Protected ranking
- SR = Special ranking
- SE = Special exempt
- JE = Junior exempt
- JR = Junior Accelerator Programme entrant
- CO = College Accelerator Programme entrant
- NG = Next Gen Accelerator Program entrant
- w/o = Walkover
- r = Retired
- d = Defaulted

=== Bracket ===
Semifinals
(France) Henri Leconte (France) Cédric Pioline	3	7^{7}	[4]
(United States) Michael Chang (United States) Todd Martin	6	6^{4}	[10]
(Australia) Pat Cash (Australia) Mark Philippoussis	7^{7}	6
(United States) John McEnroe (United States) Patrick McEnroe	6^{4}	4

Final
(United States) Michael Chang (United States) Todd Martin	2	1
(Australia) Pat Cash (Australia) Mark Philippoussis	6	6
