= 2017 US Open – Women's champions invitational =

Women's champions invitational
- 2017 US Open

Final
- Champions: (Belgium) Kim Clijsters (United States) Martina Navratilova
- Runners-up: (United States) Lindsay Davenport (United States) Mary Joe Fernández
- Score: 4–6, 6–2, [10–4]

Events
Singles	men	women		boys	girls
Doubles	men	women	mixed	boys	girls
WC Singles	men	women	quad
WC Doubles	men	women	quad
Legends	men	women	mixed
← 2016 ·	US Open	· 2018 →

Lindsay Davenport and Mary Joe Fernández were the defending champions, but lost in the final to Kim Clijsters and Martina Navratilova, 6–4, 2–6, [4–10].

== Draw ==
=== Key ===
- Q = Qualifier
- WC = Wild card
- LL = Lucky loser
- Alt = Alternate
- ITF = ITF entry
- PR = Protected ranking
- SR = Special ranking
- SE = Special exempt
- JE = Junior exempt
- JR = Junior Accelerator Programme entrant
- CO = College Accelerator Programme entrant
- NG = Next Gen Accelerator Program entrant
- w/o = Walkover
- r = Retired
- d = Defaulted

=== Finals ===
Semifinals
(France) Marion Bartoli (Australia) Hana Mandliková	4	2
(United States) Lindsay Davenport (United States) Mary Joe Fernández	6	6
(United States) Tracy Austin (United States) Gigi Fernández	3	4
(Belgium) Kim Clijsters (United States) Martina Navratilova	6	6

Final
(United States) Lindsay Davenport (United States) Mary Joe Fernández	6	2	[4]
(Belgium) Kim Clijsters (United States) Martina Navratilova	4	6	[10]
