= 2015 US Open – Women's champions invitational =

Women's champions invitational
- 2015 US Open

Events
Singles	men	women		boys	girls
Doubles	men	women	mixed	boys	girls
WC Singles	men	women	quad
WC Doubles	men	women	quad
Legends	men	women	mixed
← 2014 ·	US Open	· 2016 →

Lindsay Davenport and Mary Joe Fernández were scheduled to play Tracy Austin and Gigi Fernández in the final. However, the match was canceled on 12 September due to rain and was not rescheduled.

== Draw ==
=== Key ===
- Q = Qualifier
- WC = Wild card
- LL = Lucky loser
- Alt = Alternate
- ITF = ITF entry
- PR = Protected ranking
- SR = Special ranking
- SE = Special exempt
- JE = Junior exempt
- JR = Junior Accelerator Programme entrant
- CO = College Accelerator Programme entrant
- NG = Next Gen Accelerator Program entrant
- w/o = Walkover
- r = Retired
- d = Defaulted

=== Bracket ===
Semifinals
(Croatia) Iva Majoli (United States) Chanda Rubin	4	4
(United States) Lindsay Davenport (United States) Mary Joe Fernández	6	6
(United States) Tracy Austin (United States) Gigi Fernández	7^{7}	4	[10]
(United States) Martina Navratilova (Spain) Arantxa Sánchez Vicario	6^{3}	6	[5]

Final
(United States) Lindsay Davenport (United States) Mary Joe Fernández
(United States) Tracy Austin (United States) Gigi Fernández
