= 2017 US Open – Wheelchair women's singles =

Wheelchair women's singles
- 2017 US Open

Final
- Champion: (Japan) Yui Kamiji
- Runner-up: (Netherlands) Diede de Groot
- Score: 7–5, 6–2

Events
Singles	men	women		boys	girls
Doubles	men	women	mixed	boys	girls
WC Singles	men	women	quad
WC Doubles	men	women	quad
Legends	men	women	mixed
← 2015 ·	US Open	· 2018 →

Yui Kamiji defeated Diede de Groot in the final, 7–5, 6–2 to win the women's singles wheelchair tennis title at the 2017 US Open. It was the first of seven consecutive years where Kamiji and de Groot would meet in the final, and as of 2023 the final remains de Groot's only singles defeat at the US Open.

Jordanne Whiley was the reigning champion from when the event was last held in 2015, but did not participate this year due to pregnancy. The event was not held in 2016 due to a schedule conflict with the 2016 Summer Paralympics.

== Seeds ==
1. (Japan) Yui Kamiji (champion)
2. (Netherlands) Diede de Groot (final)

== Draw ==
=== Key ===
- Q = Qualifier
- WC = Wild card
- LL = Lucky loser
- Alt = Alternate
- ITF = ITF entry
- PR = Protected ranking
- SR = Special ranking
- SE = Special exempt
- JE = Junior exempt
- JR = Junior Accelerator Programme entrant
- CO = College Accelerator Programme entrant
- NG = Next Gen Accelerator Program entrant
- w/o = Walkover
- r = Retired
- d = Defaulted

=== Draw ===
Quarterfinals
1	(Japan) Yui Kamiji	6	6
(United Kingdom) Lucy Shuker	1	0
(Netherlands) Aniek van Koot	6	6
(South Africa) Kgothatso Montjane	4	2
(Netherlands) Marjolein Buis	6	6
WC	(United States) Dana Mathewson	2	3
(Germany) Sabine Ellerbrock	2	4
2	(Netherlands) Diede de Groot	6	6

Semifinals
1	(Japan) Yui Kamiji	6	2	6
(Netherlands) Aniek van Koot	4	6	2
(Netherlands) Marjolein Buis	4	4
2	(Netherlands) Diede de Groot	6	6

Final
1	(Japan) Yui Kamiji	7	6
2	(Netherlands) Diede de Groot	5	2
