= 2016 US Open – Girls' doubles =

Girls' doubles
- 2016 US Open

Final
- Champions: (United States) Jada Hart (United States) Ena Shibahara
- Runners-up: (United States) Kayla Day (United States) Caroline Dolehide
- Score: 4–6, 6–2, [13–11]

Events
Singles	men	women		boys	girls
Doubles	men	women	mixed	boys	girls
WC Singles	men	women	quad
WC Doubles	men	women	quad
Legends	men	women	mixed
- US Open

Jada Hart and Ena Shibahara won the title, defeating Kayla Day and Caroline Dolehide in the final, 4–6, 6–2, [13–11]. They saved two championship points in the match tiebreaker.

Viktória Kužmová and Aleksandra Pospelova were the defending champions, however Pospelova chose not to participate. Kužmová played alongside Federica Bilardo and lost in the first round to Nicole Frenkel and Sofia Kenin.

== Seeds ==
1. (Russia) Olesya Pervushina / (Russia) Anastasia Potapova (first round)
2. (Russia) Amina Anshba / (Ukraine) Katarina Zavatska (first round)
3. (United States) Usue Maitane Arconada / (United States) Claire Liu (quarterfinals)
4. (United States) Amanda Anisimova / (United States) Alexandra Sanford (first round, withdrew)
5. (Slovenia) Kaja Juvan / (Poland) Iga Świątek (semifinals)
6. (United Kingdom) Emily Appleton / (Japan) Ayumi Miyamoto (first round)
7. (Canada) Bianca Andreescu / (United Kingdom) Katie Swan (quarterfinals, withdrew)
8. (United States) Maria Mateas / (Romania) Ioana Mincă (second round)

== Draw ==
Key

- Q = Qualifier
- WC = Wild card
- LL = Lucky loser
- Alt = Alternate
- ITF = ITF entry
- PR = Protected ranking
- SR = Special ranking
- SE = Special exempt
- JE = Junior exempt
- JR = Junior Accelerator Programme entrant
- CO = College Accelerator Programme entrant
- NG = Next Gen Accelerator Program entrant
- w/o = Walkover
- r = Retired
- d = Defaulted

=== Finals ===
Semifinals
WC	(United States) Jada Hart (United States) Ena Shibahara	6	4	[10]
5	(Slovenia) Kaja Juvan (Poland) Iga Świątek	3	6	[4]
(United States) Kayla Day (United States) Caroline Dolehide	6	6
(Japan) Mai Hontama (Ukraine) Anastasia Zarytska	4	1

Final
WC	(United States) Jada Hart (United States) Ena Shibahara	4	6	[13]
(United States) Kayla Day (United States) Caroline Dolehide	6	2	[11]

=== Top half ===
First round
1	(Russia) Olesya Pervushina (Russia) Anastasia Potapova	4	2
WC	(United States) Jada Hart (United States) Ena Shibahara	6	6
(China) Du Zhima (India) Pranjala Yadlapalli	4	6	[5]
(Chinese Taipei) Cho I-hsuan (Japan) Yuki Naito	6	3	[10]
(United States) Morgan Coppoc (United States) Taylor Johnson	6	1	[10]
(Japan) Mayuka Aikawa (Switzerland) Ylena In-Albon	3	6	[7]
(United States) Abigail Desiatnikov (Peru) Dominique Schaefer	3	1
8	(United States) Maria Mateas (Romania) Ioana Mincă	6	6
4	(United States) Amanda Anisimova (United States) Alexandra Sanford
(China) Wang Xiyu (China) Zheng Wushuang	w/o
(Austria) Mira Antonitsch (Hungary) Panna Udvardy	4	5
(Spain) Paula Arias Manjón (Spain) Eva Guerrero Álvarez	6	7
(United States) Nicole Frenkel (United States) Sofia Kenin	6^{1}	6	[10]
(Italy) Federica Bilardo (Slovakia) Viktória Kužmová	7^{7}	3	[8]
(Tunisia) Chiraz Bechri (Poland) Wiktoria Kulik	3	1
5	(Slovenia) Kaja Juvan (Poland) Iga Świątek	6	6

Second round
WC	(United States) J Hart (United States) E Shibahara	6	7^{7}
(Chinese Taipei) I-h Cho (Japan) Y Naito	3	6^{5}
(United States) M Coppoc (United States) T Johnson	7^{7}	6
8	(United States) M Mateas (Romania) I Mincă	6^{1}	1
(China) X Wang (China) W Zheng	3	7	[13]
(Spain) P Arias Manjón (Spain) E Guerrero Álvarez	6	6^{0}	[11]
(United States) N Frenkel (United States) S Kenin	6	3	[4]
5	(Slovenia) K Juvan (Poland) I Świątek	3	6	[10]

Quarterfinals
WC	(United States) J Hart (United States) E Shibahara	6	6
(United States) M Coppoc (United States) T Johnson	2	3
(China) X Wang (China) W Zheng	4	3
5	(Slovenia) K Juvan (Poland) I Świątek	6	6

Semifinals
WC	(United States) J Hart (United States) E Shibahara	6	4	[10]
5	(Slovenia) K Juvan (Poland) I Świątek	3	6	[4]

=== Bottom half ===
First round
6	(United Kingdom) Emily Appleton (Japan) Ayumi Miyamoto	1	2
(United States) Kayla Day (United States) Caroline Dolehide	6	6
(Israel) Shelly Krolitzky (Mexico) María José Portillo Ramírez	w/o
(Russia) Varvara Gracheva (Russia) Elena Rybakina
(Norway) Malene Helgø (Japan) Chihiro Muramatsu	1	7^{8}	[10]
(Italy) Tatiana Pieri (Italy) Lucrezia Stefanini	6	6^{6}	[6]
(Czech Republic) Lucie Kaňková (Czech Republic) Johana Marková	1	2
3	(United States) Usue Maitane Arconada (United States) Claire Liu	6	6
7	(Canada) Bianca Andreescu (United Kingdom) Katie Swan	6	6
(Argentina) María Lourdes Carlé (Paraguay) Lara Escauriza	1	3
(Germany) Irina Cantos Siemers (Poland) Daria Kuczer	6	6
WC	(United States) Carson Branstine (United States) Kylie McKenzie	3	2
(Sweden) Mirjam Björklund (Russia) Marta Paigina	4	4
(Japan) Mai Hontama (Ukraine) Anastasia Zarytska	6	6
Alt	(United States) Hailey Baptiste (United States) Ann Li	6	3	[10]
2	(Russia) Amina Anshba (Ukraine) Katarina Zavatska	2	6	[7]

Second round
(United States) K Day (United States) C Dolehide	6	6
(Israel) S Krolitzky (Mexico) MJ Portillo Ramírez	4	3
(Norway) M Helgø (Japan) C Muramatsu	6^{7}	3
3	(United States) UM Arconada (United States) C Liu	7^{9}	6
7	(Canada) B Andreescu (United Kingdom) K Swan	7^{7}	6
(Germany) I Cantos Siemers (Poland) D Kuczer	6^{4}	0
(Japan) M Hontama (Ukraine) A Zarytska	6	6
Alt	(United States) H Baptiste (United States) A Li	3	1

Quarterfinals
(United States) K Day (United States) C Dolehide	6	4	[10]
3	(United States) UM Arconada (United States) C Liu	3	6	[3]
7	(Canada) B Andreescu (United Kingdom) K Swan
(Japan) M Hontama (Ukraine) A Zarytska	w/o

Semifinals
(United States) K Day (United States) C Dolehide	6	6
(Japan) M Hontama (Ukraine) A Zarytska	4	1
