= 2016 US Open – Boys' singles =

Boys' singles
- 2016 US Open

Final
- Champion: (Canada) Félix Auger-Aliassime
- Runner-up: (Serbia) Miomir Kecmanović
- Score: 6–3, 6–0

Events
Singles	men	women		boys	girls
Doubles	men	women	mixed	boys	girls
WC Singles	men	women	quad
WC Doubles	men	women	quad
Legends	men	women	mixed
- US Open

Taylor Harry Fritz was the defending champion, but is no longer eligible to compete.

Félix Auger-Aliassime won the title, defeating Miomir Kecmanović in the final, 6–3, 6–0.

== Seeds ==
1. (Greece) Stefanos Tsitsipas (semifinals)
2. (Australia) Alex De Minaur (second round)
3. (United States) Ulises Blanch (second round)
4. (France) Geoffrey Blancaneaux (second round)
5. (Serbia) Miomir Kecmanović (final)
6. (Canada) Félix Auger-Aliassime (champion)
7. (Japan) Yosuke Watanuki (semifinals)
8. (Argentina) Genaro Alberto Olivieri (second round)
9. (Canada) Benjamin Sigouin (first round)
10. (United States) John McNally (first round)
11. (Estonia) Kenneth Raisma (quarterfinals)
12. (Egypt) Youssef Hossam (third round)
13. (Spain) Nicola Kuhn (quarterfinals)
14. (Germany) Marvin Möller (third round)
15. (China) Wu Yibing (first round)
16. (Germany) Louis Wessels (second round)

== Main draw ==
Key

- Q = Qualifier
- WC = Wild card
- LL = Lucky loser
- Alt = Alternate
- ITF = ITF entry
- PR = Protected ranking
- SR = Special ranking
- SE = Special exempt
- JE = Junior exempt
- JR = Junior Accelerator Programme entrant
- CO = College Accelerator Programme entrant
- NG = Next Gen Accelerator Program entrant
- w/o = Walkover
- r = Retired
- d = Defaulted

=== Finals ===
Quarterfinals
1	(Greece) Stefanos Tsitsipas	6	7^{7}
11	(Estonia) Kenneth Raisma	1	6^{4}
Q	(United States) Patrick Kypson	1	2
6	(Canada) Félix Auger-Aliassime	6	6
7	(Japan) Yosuke Watanuki	6	6
(Uzbekistan) Khumoyun Sultanov	4	1
5	(Serbia) Miomir Kecmanović	6	5	6
13	(Spain) Nicola Kuhn	2	7	4

Semifinals
1	(Greece) Stefanos Tsitsipas	4	5
6	(Canada) Félix Auger-Aliassime	6	7
7	(Japan) Yosuke Watanuki	1	4
5	(Serbia) Miomir Kecmanović	6	6

Final
6	(Canada) Félix Auger-Aliassime	6	6
5	(Serbia) Miomir Kecmanović	3	0

=== Top half ===
==== Section 1 ====
First round
1	(Greece) Stefanos Tsitsipas	6	6
WC	(United States) Oliver Crawford	2	3
(Australia) Blake Ellis	6	4	6
(Brazil) Felipe Meligeni Alves	2	6	2
(Spain) Eduard Güell Bartrina	4	3
WC	(United States) Alexandre Rotsaert	6	6
(Poland) Kacper Żuk	4	3
14	(Germany) Marvin Möller	6	6
11	(Estonia) Kenneth Raisma	6	6
(United Kingdom) Alastair Gray	4	3
(United States) Vasil Kirkov	3	2
(Japan) Yuta Shimizu	6	6
Q	(Italy) Riccardo Balzerani	5	6	6
Q	(France) Constantin Bittoun Kouzmine	7	4	1
(United States) Gianni Ross	6	5	2
8	(Argentina) Genaro Alberto Olivieri	2	7	6

Second round
1	(Greece) S Tsitsipas	6	7
(Australia) B Ellis	2	5
WC	(United States) A Rotsaert	2	3
14	(Germany) M Möller	6	6
11	(Estonia) K Raisma	6	5	7
(Japan) Y Shimizu	1	7	5
Q	(Italy) R Balzerani	4	6	6
8	(Argentina) GA Olivieri	6	3	4

Third round
1	(Greece) S Tsitsipas	6	7
14	(Germany) M Möller	2	5
11	(Estonia) K Raisma	4	6	6
Q	(Italy) R Balzerani	6	3	4

Quarterfinals
1	(Greece) S Tsitsipas	6	7^{7}
11	(Estonia) K Raisma	1	6^{4}

==== Section 2 ====
First round
4	(France) Geoffrey Blancaneaux	3	7	7^{7}
(Brazil) Gabriel Décamps	6	5	6^{5}
(United States) J. J. Wolf	6	6
Q	(Italy) Andrea Guerrieri	4	1
Q	(United States) Patrick Kypson	7^{7}	7
Q	(Japan) Yuta Kikuchi	6^{3}	5
(Romania) Vlad Andrei Dancu	4	6	6
15	(China) Wu Yibing	6	3	4
10	(United States) John McNally	6	3	3
(Spain) Alejandro Davidovich Fokina	3	6	6
(Chinese Taipei) Lo Chien-hsun	6	5	6
(Germany) Rudolf Molleker	3	7	2
(Russia) Lev Kazakov	3	4
(Australia) Alexei Popyrin	6	6
WC	(United States) Nathan Ponwith	2	4
6	(Canada) Félix Auger-Aliassime	6	6

Second round
4	(France) G Blancaneaux	1	3
(United States) J. J. Wolf	6	6
Q	(United States) P Kypson	6	6
(Romania) VA Dancu	4	1
(Spain) A Davidovich Fokina	6	6
(Chinese Taipei) C-h Lo	4	2
(Australia) A Popyrin	6	3	4
6	(Canada) F Auger-Aliassime	4	6	6

Third round
(United States) J. J. Wolf	6	3	0
Q	(United States) P Kypson	2	6	6
(Spain) A Davidovich Fokina	4	6^{6}
6	(Canada) F Auger-Aliassime	6	7^{8}

Quarterfinals
Q	(United States) P Kypson	1	2
6	(Canada) F Auger-Aliassime	6	6

=== Bottom half ===
==== Section 3 ====
First round
7	(Japan) Yosuke Watanuki	6	6
WC	(United States) Trent Bryde	2	3
(Italy) Liam Caruana	6	6
(Portugal) Duarte Vale	2	4
(United Kingdom) Ryan James Storrie	4	4
WC	(United States) Sebastian Korda	6	6
(France) Louis Tessa	1	7^{7}	6
9	(Canada) Benjamin Sigouin	6	6^{2}	3
16	(Germany) Louis Wessels	4	6	7
(Philippines) Alberto Lim	6	4	5
WC	(France) Corentin Moutet	6	2
WC	(United States) Ezekiel Clark	1	0^{r}
Q	(Sweden) Jonas Eriksson Ziverts	3	2
(Uzbekistan) Khumoyun Sultanov	6	6
(Brazil) Orlando Luz	4	4
3	(United States) Ulises Blanch	6	6

Second round
7	(Japan) Y Watanuki	6	6
(Italy) L Caruana	2	4
WC	(United States) S Korda	5	6	6
(France) L Tessa	7	3	2
16	(Germany) L Wessels	3	7	6^{4}
WC	(France) C Moutet	6	5	7^{7}
(Uzbekistan) K Sultanov	7	6^{6}	3
3	(United States) U Blanch	5	7^{8}	1^{r}

Third round
7	(Japan) Y Watanuki	6^{3}	6	6
WC	(United States) S Korda	7^{7}	2	2
WC	(France) C Moutet	7^{7}	5	4
(Uzbekistan) K Sultanov	6^{3}	7	6

Quarterfinals
7	(Japan) Y Watanuki	6	6
(Uzbekistan) K Sultanov	4	1

==== Section 4 ====
First round
5	(Serbia) Miomir Kecmanović	6^{4}	6	6
(Japan) Toru Horie	7^{7}	3	4
(United States) Brandon Holt	6	6
(Turkey) Ergi Kırkın	4	2
(Chinese Taipei) Wu Tung-lin	6^{3}	2
Q	(United States) Olukayode Ayeni	7^{7}	6
Q	(Italy) Enrico Dalla Valle	7^{7}	3	6^{3}
12	(Egypt) Youssef Hossam	6^{5}	6	7^{7}
13	(Spain) Nicola Kuhn	6	7^{8}
(France) Elliot Benchetrit	2	6^{6}
(United States) Sam Riffice	6^{4}	6	6
(Poland) Piotr Matuszewski	7^{7}	2	0
(Bolivia) Juan Carlos Aguilar	6	1	2
(Israel) Yshai Oliel	4	6	6
WC	(United States) Lukas Greif	4	0
2	(Australia) Alex De Minaur	6	6

Second round
5	(Serbia) M Kecmanović	7	6
(United States) B Holt	5	2
Q	(United States) O Ayeni	3	2
12	(Egypt) Y Hossam	6	6
13	(Spain) N Kuhn	6	4	6
(United States) S Riffice	2	6	1
(Israel) Y Oliel	4	6	7^{7}
2	(Australia) A De Minaur	6	2	6^{2}

Third round
5	(Serbia) M Kecmanović	6	6
12	(Egypt) Y Hossam	2	2
13	(Spain) N Kuhn	6	6
(Israel) Y Oliel	3	2

Quarterfinals
5	(Serbia) M Kecmanović	6	5	6
13	(Spain) N Kuhn	2	7	4

== Qualifying ==
=== Seeds ===
1. (China) Zhao Lingxi (first round)
2. (Japan) Naoki Tajima (first round)
3. (Belgium) Zizou Bergs (first round)
4. (Sweden) Jonas Eriksson Ziverts (qualified)
5. (Hong Kong) Anthony Jackie Tang (first round)
6. (Russia) Mikhail Sokolovskiy (first round)
7. (Brazil) Lucas Koelle (qualifying competition)
8. (Ukraine) Nikita Mashtakov (qualifying competition)
9. (France) Constantin Bittoun Kouzmine (qualified)
10. (Belgium) Seppe Cuypers (first round)
11. (France) Constant de la Bassetière (first round)
12. (Italy) Riccardo Balzerani (qualified)
13. (Canada) Jack Mingjie Lin (qualifying competition)
14. (Italy) Andrea Guerrieri (qualified)
15. (Estonia) Mattias Siimar (qualifying competition)
16. (Bulgaria) Alexander Donski (qualifying competition)

=== Qualifiers ===
1. (France) Constantin Bittoun Kouzmine
2. (Italy) Enrico Dalla Valle
3. (Italy) Andrea Guerrieri
4. (Sweden) Jonas Eriksson Ziverts
5. (United States) Patrick Kypson
6. (United States) Olukayode Ayeni
7. (Japan) Yuta Kikuchi
8. (Italy) Riccardo Balzerani

=== Draw ===
==== First qualifier ====
First round
1	(China) Zhao Lingxi	6^{5}	4
WC	(United States) Adam Neff	7^{7}	6
(Argentina) Santiago Rodríguez Taverna	6	5	6^{3}
9	(France) Constantin Bittoun Kouzmine	2	7	7^{7}

Qualifying competition
WC	(United States) Adam Neff	6	2	0
9	(France) Constantin Bittoun Kouzmine	2	6	6

==== Second qualifier ====
First round
2	(Japan) Naoki Tajima	6	4	1
(Italy) Enrico Dalla Valle	3	6	6
WC	(United States) Sangeet Sridhar	3	1
15	(Estonia) Mattias Siimar	6	6

Qualifying competition
(Italy) Enrico Dalla Valle	6	6
15	(Estonia) Mattias Siimar	2	4

==== Third qualifier ====
First round
3	(Belgium) Zizou Bergs	6^{4}	1
(Russia) Alen Avidzba	7^{7}	6
WC	(United States) Keenan Mayo	4	0
14	(Italy) Andrea Guerrieri	6	6

Qualifying competition
(Russia) Alen Avidzba	1	1
14	(Italy) Andrea Guerrieri	6	6

==== Fourth qualifier ====
First round
4	(Sweden) Jonas Eriksson Ziverts	6	6
(Japan) Shinji Hazawa	3	3
(Brazil) Thiago Seyboth Wild	3	6	4
13	(Canada) Jack Mingjie Lin	6	1	6

Qualifying competition
4	(Sweden) Jonas Eriksson Ziverts	6	7^{7}
13	(Canada) Jack Mingjie Lin	2	6^{5}

==== Fifth qualifier ====
First round
5	(Hong Kong) Anthony Jackie Tang	1	2
WC	(United States) Patrick Kypson	6	6
(Italy) Jacopo Berrettini	4	6	3
16	(Bulgaria) Alexander Donski	6	3	6

Qualifying competition
WC	(United States) Patrick Kypson	6	3	6
16	(Bulgaria) Alexander Donski	3	6	3

==== Sixth qualifier ====
First round
6	(Russia) Mikhail Sokolovskiy	6^{4}	6	6^{4}
(United States) Olukayode Ayeni	7^{7}	4	7^{7}
(United Kingdom) Ewan Moore	3	7	6
11	(France) Constant de la Bassetière	6	5	4

Qualifying competition
(United States) Olukayode Ayeni	6	3	6
(United Kingdom) Ewan Moore	3	6	3

==== Seventh qualifier ====
First round
7	(Brazil) Lucas Koelle	6	3	6
(Puerto Rico) Sebastián Arcila	4	6	3
WC	(Japan) Yuta Kikuchi	6	6
10	(Belgium) Seppe Cuypers	3	1

Qualifying competition
7	(Brazil) Lucas Koelle	0	1
WC	(Japan) Yuta Kikuchi	6	6

==== Eighth qualifier ====
First round
8	(Ukraine) Nikita Mashtakov	6	2	7^{7}
(China) Lyu Chengze	3	6	6^{1}
WC	(United States) Zane Khan	3	1
12	(Italy) Riccardo Balzerani	6	6

Qualifying competition
8	(Ukraine) Nikita Mashtakov	4	5
12	(Italy) Riccardo Balzerani	6	7
