= 2017 US Open – Wheelchair men's singles =

Wheelchair men's singles
- 2017 US Open

Final
- Champion: (France) Stéphane Houdet
- Runner-up: (United Kingdom) Alfie Hewett
- Score: 6–2, 4–6, 6–3

Events
| Singles | men | women | | boys | girls |
| Doubles | men | women | mixed | boys | girls |
| WC Singles | men | women | quad |
| WC Doubles | men | women | quad |
| Legends | men | women | mixed |
| ← 2015 · | US Open | · 2018 → |

Stéphane Houdet defeated Alfie Hewett in the final, 6–2, 4–6, 6–3 to win the men's singles wheelchair tennis title at the 2017 US Open.

Shingo Kunieda was the two-time defending champion from when the event was last held in 2015, but was defeated by Hewett in the quarterfinals.

There was no edition of the event in 2016 due to a scheduling conflict with the 2016 Summer Paralympics.

== Seeds ==
1. (Argentina) Gustavo Fernández (semifinals)
2. (United Kingdom) Gordon Reid (semifinals)

== Draw ==
=== Key ===
- Q = Qualifier
- WC = Wild card
- LL = Lucky loser
- Alt = Alternate
- ITF = ITF entry
- PR = Protected ranking
- SR = Special ranking
- SE = Special exempt
- JE = Junior exempt
- JR = Junior Accelerator Programme entrant
- CO = College Accelerator Programme entrant
- NG = Next Gen Accelerator Program entrant
- w/o = Walkover
- r = Retired
- d = Defaulted

=== Bracket ===
Quarterfinals
1 | (Argentina) Gustavo Fernández | 1 | 6 | 7
(France) Nicolas Peifer | 6 | 1 | 5
(Sweden) Stefan Olsson | 3 | 3
(France) Stéphane Houdet | 6 | 6
(United Kingdom) Alfie Hewett | 4 | 6 | 6
WC | (Japan) Shingo Kunieda | 6 | 4 | 3
(Belgium) Joachim Gérard | 7^{7} | 4 | 1
2 | (United Kingdom) Gordon Reid | 6^{5} | 6 | 6

Semifinals
1 | (Argentina) Gustavo Fernández | 7^{7} | 3 | 4
(France) Stéphane Houdet | 6^{4} | 6 | 6
(United Kingdom) Alfie Hewett | 7 | 5 | 7^{10}
2 | (United Kingdom) Gordon Reid | 5 | 7 | 6^{8}

Final
(France) Stéphane Houdet | 6 | 4 | 6
(United Kingdom) Alfie Hewett | 2 | 6 | 3
