= 2016 US Open – Men's champions invitational =

Men's champions invitational
- 2016 US Open

Final
- Champions: (Australia) Pat Cash (Australia) Mark Philippoussis
- Runners-up: (United States) John McEnroe (United States) Patrick McEnroe
- Score: 6–4, 6–3

Events
| Singles | men | women | | boys | girls |
| Doubles | men | women | mixed | boys | girls |
| WC Singles | men | women | quad |
| WC Doubles | men | women | quad |
| Legends | men | women | mixed |
| ← 2015 · | US Open | · 2017 → |

Pat Cash and Mark Philippoussis were the defending champions, and successfully defended their title, defeating John and Patrick McEnroe in the final 6–4, 6–3.

== Draw ==
=== Key ===
- Q = Qualifier
- WC = Wild card
- LL = Lucky loser
- Alt = Alternate
- ITF = ITF entry
- PR = Protected ranking
- SR = Special ranking
- SE = Special exempt
- JE = Junior exempt
- JR = Junior Accelerator Programme entrant
- CO = College Accelerator Programme entrant
- NG = Next Gen Accelerator Program entrant
- w/o = Walkover
- r = Retired
- d = Defaulted

=== Finals ===
Semifinals
(Australia) Pat Cash (Australia) Mark Philippoussis | 7 | 7
(United States) Michael Chang (United States) Rick Leach | 5 | 5
(United States) Jimmy Arias (France) Henri Leconte | 4 | 1
(United States) John McEnroe (United States) Patrick McEnroe | 6 | 6

Final
(Australia) Pat Cash (Australia) Mark Philippoussis | 6 | 6
(United States) John McEnroe (United States) Patrick McEnroe | 4 | 3
