= 2015 US Open – Wheelchair quad doubles =

Wheelchair quad doubles
- 2015 US Open

Final
- Champions: (United States) Nick Taylor (United States) David Wagner
- Runners-up: (Australia) Dylan Alcott (United Kingdom) Andrew Lapthorne
- Score: 4–6, 6–2, [10–7]

Events
Singles	men	women		boys	girls
Doubles	men	women	mixed	boys	girls
WC Singles	men	women	quad
WC Doubles	men	women	quad
Legends	men	women	mixed
← 2014 ·	US Open	· 2017 →

Wheelchair quad doubles, a variation of wheelchair tennis, was an event in the 2015 US Open.

Six-time defending champions Nick Taylor and David Wagner defeated Dylan Alcott and Andrew Lapthorne in the final, 4–6, 6–2, [10–7] to win the quad doubles wheelchair tennis title at the 2015 US Open.

== Draw ==
Key

- Q = Qualifier
- WC = Wild card
- LL = Lucky loser
- Alt = Alternate
- ITF = ITF entry
- PR = Protected ranking
- SR = Special ranking
- SE = Special exempt
- JE = Junior exempt
- JR = Junior Accelerator Programme entrant
- CO = College Accelerator Programme entrant
- NG = Next Gen Accelerator Program entrant
- w/o = Walkover
- r = Retired
- d = Defaulted

=== Final ===
Final
(United States) Nick Taylor (United States) David Wagner	4	6	[10]
(Australia) Dylan Alcott (United Kingdom) Andrew Lapthorne	6	2	[7]
