= 2015 US Open – Wheelchair women's doubles =

Wheelchair women's doubles
- 2015 US Open

Final
- Champions: (Netherlands) Jiske Griffioen (Netherlands) Aniek van Koot
- Runners-up: (Netherlands) Marjolein Buis (Germany) Sabine Ellerbrock
- Score: 7–6^{(7–3)}, 6–1

Events
Singles	men	women		boys	girls
Doubles	men	women	mixed	boys	girls
WC Singles	men	women	quad
WC Doubles	men	women	quad
Legends	men	women	mixed
← 2014 ·	US Open	· 2017 →

Jiske Griffioen and Aniek van Koot defeated Marjolein Buis and Sabine Ellerbrock in the final, 7–6^{(7–3)}, 6–1 to win the women's doubles wheelchair tennis title at the 2015 US Open. With the win, van Koot completed the double career Grand Slam.

Yui Kamiji and Jordanne Whiley were the defending champions, but were defeated in the semifinals by Buis and Ellerbrock.

== Seeds ==
1. (Japan) Yui Kamiji / (United Kingdom) Jordanne Whiley (semifinals)
2. (Netherlands) Jiske Griffioen / (Netherlands) Aniek van Koot (champions)

== Draw ==
=== Key ===
- Q = Qualifier
- WC = Wild card
- LL = Lucky loser
- Alt = Alternate
- ITF = ITF entry
- PR = Protected ranking
- SR = Special ranking
- SE = Special exempt
- JE = Junior exempt
- JR = Junior Accelerator Programme entrant
- CO = College Accelerator Programme entrant
- NG = Next Gen Accelerator Program entrant
- w/o = Walkover
- r = Retired
- d = Defaulted

=== Bracket ===
Semifinals
1	(Japan) Yui Kamiji (United Kingdom) Jordanne Whiley	7^{7}	1	[6]
(Netherlands) Marjolein Buis (Germany) Sabine Ellerbrock	6^{5}	6	[10]
(United Kingdom) Lucy Shuker (United States) Kaitlyn Verfuerth	3	0
2	(Netherlands) Jiske Griffioen (Netherlands) Aniek van Koot	6	6

Final
(Netherlands) Marjolein Buis (Germany) Sabine Ellerbrock	6^{3}	1
2	(Netherlands) Jiske Griffioen (Netherlands) Aniek van Koot	7^{7}	6
