= 2017 US Open – Wheelchair quad singles =

Wheelchair quad singles
- 2017 US Open

Final
- Champion: (United States) David Wagner
- Runner-up: (United Kingdom) Andrew Lapthorne
- Score: 7–5, 3–6, 6–4

Events
Singles	men	women		boys	girls
Doubles	men	women	mixed	boys	girls
WC Singles	men	women	quad
WC Doubles	men	women	quad
Legends	men	women	mixed
← 2015 ·	US Open	· 2018 →

David Wagner defeated Andrew Lapthorne in the final, 7–5, 3–6, 6–4 to win the quad singles wheelchair tennis title at the 2017 US Open.

Dylan Alcott was the defending champion from when the event was last held in 2015, but was eliminated in the round-robin stage.

The event was not held in 2016 due to a scheduling conflict with the 2016 Summer Paralympics.

== Draw ==
=== Key ===
- Q = Qualifier
- WC = Wild card
- LL = Lucky loser
- Alt = Alternate
- ITF = ITF entry
- PR = Protected ranking
- SR = Special ranking
- SE = Special exempt
- JE = Junior exempt
- JR = Junior Accelerator Programme entrant
- CO = College Accelerator Programme entrant
- NG = Next Gen Accelerator Program entrant
- w/o = Walkover
- r = Retired
- d = Defaulted

=== Final ===
Final
(United States) David Wagner	7	3	6
(United Kingdom) Andrew Lapthorne	5	6	4

=== Round robin ===
		(United States) D Wagner	(Australia) D Alcott	(United Kingdom) A Lapthorne	(United States) B Barten	RR W–L	Set W–L	Game W–L	Standings
	(United States) David Wagner		7–6^{(7–4)}, 5–7, 2–6	6–2, 6–4	6–2, 6–1	2–1	5–2	38–28	1
	(Australia) Dylan Alcott	6–7^{(4–7)}, 7–5, 6–2		4–6, 1–6	6–2, 7–5	2–1	4–3	37–33	3
	(United Kingdom) Andrew Lapthorne	2–6, 4–6	6–4, 6–1		7–5, 6–2	2–1	4–2	31–24	2
WC	(United States) Bryan Barten	2–6, 1–6	2–6, 5–7	5–7, 2–6		0–3	0–6	17–38	4

Standings are determined by: 1. number of wins; 2. number of matches; 3. in two-players-ties, head-to-head records; 4. in three-players-ties, percentage of sets won, or of games won; 5. steering-committee decision.
