= 2015 US Open – Wheelchair men's doubles =

Wheelchair men's doubles
- 2015 US Open

Final
- Champions: (France) Stéphane Houdet (United Kingdom) Gordon Reid
- Runners-up: (France) Michaël Jeremiasz (France) Nicolas Peifer
- Score: 6–3, 6–1

Events
Singles	men	women		boys	girls
Doubles	men	women	mixed	boys	girls
WC Singles	men	women	quad
WC Doubles	men	women	quad
Legends	men	women	mixed
← 2014 ·	US Open	· 2017 →

Defending champion Stéphane Houdet and his partner Gordon Reid defeated Michaël Jérémiasz and Nicolas Peifer in the final, 6–3, 6–1 to win the men's doubles wheelchair tennis title at the 2015 US Open.

Houdet and Shingo Kunieda were the defending champions, but did not participate together. Kunieda partnered Joachim Gérard, but was defeated by Jérémiasz and Peifer in the semifinals.

== Seeds ==
1. (France) Stéphane Houdet / (United Kingdom) Gordon Reid (champions)
2. (Belgium) Joachim Gérard / (Japan) Shingo Kunieda (semifinals)

== Draw ==
=== Key ===
- Q = Qualifier
- WC = Wild card
- LL = Lucky loser
- Alt = Alternate
- ITF = ITF entry
- PR = Protected ranking
- SR = Special ranking
- SE = Special exempt
- JE = Junior exempt
- JR = Junior Accelerator Programme entrant
- CO = College Accelerator Programme entrant
- NG = Next Gen Accelerator Program entrant
- w/o = Walkover
- r = Retired
- d = Defaulted

=== Bracket ===
Semifinals
1	(France) Stéphane Houdet (United Kingdom) Gordon Reid	6	7^{7}
(Argentina) Gustavo Fernández (Netherlands) Maikel Scheffers	1	6^{3}
(France) Michaël Jeremiasz (France) Nicolas Peifer	6	5	[11]
2	(Belgium) Joachim Gérard (Japan) Shingo Kunieda	1	7	[9]

Final
1	(France) Stéphane Houdet (United Kingdom) Gordon Reid	6	6
(France) Michaël Jeremiasz (France) Nicolas Peifer	3	1
