= 2015 US Open – Boys' doubles =

Boys' doubles
- 2015 US Open

Final
- Champions: (Canada) Félix Auger-Aliassime (Canada) Denis Shapovalov
- Runners-up: (United States) Brandon Holt (United States) Riley Smith
- Score: 7–5, 7–6^{(7–3)}

Events
Singles	men	women		boys	girls
Doubles	men	women	mixed	boys	girls
WC Singles	men	women	quad
WC Doubles	men	women	quad
Legends	men	women	mixed
- US Open

Omar Jasika and Naoki Nakagawa are the defending champions, but they chose not to participate.
Félix Auger-Aliassime and Denis Shapovalov won the title, defeating Brandon Holt and Riley Smith in the final, 7–5, 7–6^{(7–3)}.

== Seeds ==
1. (United States) Taylor Harry Fritz / (United States) Michael Mmoh (second round)
2. (United States) William Blumberg / (United States) Tommy Paul (first round)
3. (South Korea) Chung Yun-seong / (South Korea) Hong Seong-chan (second round)
4. (Vietnam) Lý Hoàng Nam / (Japan) Akira Santillan (first round)
5. (Finland) Patrik Niklas-Salminen / (Sweden) Mikael Ymer (second round)
6. (France) Corentin Denolly / (Uzbekistan) Jurabek Karimov (second round)
7. (Chile) Marcelo Tomás Barrios Vera / (Italy) Andrea Pellegrino (first round)
8. (Serbia) Miomir Kecmanović / (Norway) Casper Ruud (first round)

== Draw ==
Key

- Q = Qualifier
- WC = Wild card
- LL = Lucky loser
- Alt = Alternate
- ITF = ITF entry
- PR = Protected ranking
- SR = Special ranking
- SE = Special exempt
- JE = Junior exempt
- JR = Junior Accelerator Programme entrant
- CO = College Accelerator Programme entrant
- NG = Next Gen Accelerator Program entrant
- w/o = Walkover
- r = Retired
- d = Defaulted

=== Finals ===
Semifinals
(South Africa) Lloyd Harris (Japan) Yosuke Watanuki	6	4	[8]
WC	(United States) Brandon Holt (United States) Riley Smith	4	6	[10]
(Greece) Stefanos Tsitsipas (Germany) Louis Wessels	4	4
(Canada) Félix Auger-Aliassime (Canada) Denis Shapovalov	6	6

Final
WC	(United States) Brandon Holt (United States) Riley Smith	5	6^{3}
(Canada) Félix Auger-Aliassime (Canada) Denis Shapovalov	7	7^{7}

=== Top half ===
First round
1	(United States) Taylor Harry Fritz (United States) Michael Mmoh	6^{3}	7^{7}	[10]
(Australia) Jake Delaney (Brazil) Orlando Luz	7^{7}	6^{3}	[6]
(Switzerland) Johan Nikles (Switzerland) Marko Osmakcic	3	4
(South Africa) Lloyd Harris (Japan) Yosuke Watanuki	6	6
(France) Geoffrey Blancaneaux (France) Ugo Humbert	6	6
(Portugal) Nuno Borges (Spain) Bernabé Zapata Miralles	3	2
(Australia) Alex De Minaur (Denmark) Benjamin Hannestad	6	6
8	(Serbia) Miomir Kecmanović (Norway) Casper Ruud	2	4
3	(South Korea) Chung Yun-seong (South Korea) Hong Seong-chan	7	6
(Argentina) Juan Pablo Ficovich (Argentina) Manuel Peña López	5	3
WC	(United States) Alexandre Rotsaert (United States) J. J. Wolf	6^{5}	3
(Slovakia) Lukáš Klein (Czech Republic) Patrik Rikl	7^{7}	6
WC	(United States) Brandon Holt (United States) Riley Smith	6	6
(Russia) Alexey Aleshchev (Russia) Denys Klok	4	0
(Italy) Federico Bonacia (Japan) Sora Fukuda	5	5
6	(France) Corentin Denolly (Uzbekistan) Jurabek Karimov	7	7

Second round
1	(United States) TH Fritz (United States) M Mmoh	6	6^{2}	[8]
(South Africa) L Harris (Japan) Y Watanuki	3	7^{7}	[10]
(France) G Blancaneaux (France) U Humbert	1	1
(Australia) A De Minaur (Denmark) B Hannestad	6	6
3	(South Korea) Y Chung (South Korea) S-c Hong	5	5
(Slovakia) L Klein (Czech Republic) P Rikl	7	7
WC	(United States) B Holt (United States) R Smith	6	6^{5}	[10]
6	(France) C Denolly (Uzbekistan) J Karimov	4	7^{7}	[6]

Quarterfinals
(South Africa) L Harris (Japan) Y Watanuki	7^{7}	7^{7}
(Australia) A De Minaur (Denmark) B Hannestad	6^{2}	6^{5}
(Slovakia) L Klein (Czech Republic) P Rikl	6	3	[4]
WC	(United States) B Holt (United States) R Smith	2	6	[10]

Semifinals
(South Africa) L Harris (Japan) Y Watanuki	6	4	[8]
WC	(United States) B Holt (United States) R Smith	4	6	[10]

=== Bottom half ===
First round
7	(Chile) Marcelo Tomás Barrios Vera (Italy) Andrea Pellegrino	6	4	[6]
(Greece) Stefanos Tsitsipas (Germany) Louis Wessels	3	6	[10]
(United States) Ulises Blanch (United States) Nathan Ponwith	6	2	[10]
(Philippines) Alberto Lim (Estonia) Mattias Siimar	3	6	[12]
WC	(United States) Vasil Kirkov (United States) Sam Riffice	6	3	[10]
(Japan) Yusuke Takahashi (Chinese Taipei) Wu Tung-lin	4	6	[6]
(Germany) Tim Sandkaulen (Hungary) Máté Valkusz	6	4	[12]
4	(Vietnam) Lý Hoàng Nam (Japan) Akira Santillan	1	6	[10]
5	(Finland) Patrik Niklas-Salminen (Sweden) Mikael Ymer	7^{7}	7
(South Korea) Oh Chan-yeong (China) Wu Yibing	6^{1}	5
(Egypt) Youssef Hossam (Japan) Jumpei Yamasaki	6	6
WC	(United States) Patrick Kypson (United States) Gianni Ross	1	4
(Argentina) Franco Capalbo (Argentina) Gerónimo Espín Busleiman	3	7^{7}	[7]
(Canada) Félix Auger-Aliassime (Canada) Denis Shapovalov	6	6^{5}	[10]
(Portugal) Felipe Cunha e Silva (Canada) Alejandro Tabilo	6^{5}	6	[10]
2	(United States) William Blumberg (United States) Tommy Paul	7^{7}	1	[6]

Second round
(Greece) S Tsitsipas (Germany) L Wessels	6	7^{7}
(Philippines) A Lim (Estonia) M Siimar	2	6^{3}
WC	(United States) V Kirkov (United States) S Riffice	7^{7}	6
(Germany) T Sandkaulen (Hungary) M Valkusz	6^{4}	4
5	(Finland) P Niklas-Salminen (Sweden) M Ymer	2	2
(Egypt) Y Hossam (Japan) J Yamasaki	6	6
(Canada) F Auger-Aliassime (Canada) D Shapovalov	6	3	[10]
(Portugal) F Cunha e Silva (Canada) A Tabilo	2	6	[4]

Quarterfinals
(Greece) S Tsitsipas (Germany) L Wessels	6	6
WC	(United States) V Kirkov (United States) S Riffice	3	2
(Egypt) Y Hossam (Japan) J Yamasaki	1	3
(Canada) F Auger-Aliassime (Canada) D Shapovalov	6	6

Semifinals
(Greece) S Tsitsipas (Germany) L Wessels	4	4
(Canada) F Auger-Aliassime (Canada) D Shapovalov	6	6
