= 2015 US Open – Wheelchair women's singles =

Wheelchair women's singles
- 2015 US Open

Final
- Champion: (United Kingdom) Jordanne Whiley
- Runner-up: (Japan) Yui Kamiji
- Score: 6–4, 0–6, 6–1

Events
Singles	men	women		boys	girls
Doubles	men	women	mixed	boys	girls
WC Singles	men	women	quad
WC Doubles	men	women	quad
Legends	men	women	mixed
← 2014 ·	US Open	· 2017 →

Jordanne Whiley defeated the defending champion Yui Kamiji in the final, 6–4, 0–6, 6–1 to win the women's singles wheelchair tennis title at the 2015 US Open.

== Seeds ==
1. (Netherlands) Jiske Griffioen (semifinals)
2. (Netherlands) Aniek van Koot (semifinals)

== Draw ==
=== Key ===
- Q = Qualifier
- WC = Wild card
- LL = Lucky loser
- Alt = Alternate
- ITF = ITF entry
- PR = Protected ranking
- SR = Special ranking
- SE = Special exempt
- JE = Junior exempt
- JR = Junior Accelerator Programme entrant
- CO = College Accelerator Programme entrant
- NG = Next Gen Accelerator Program entrant
- w/o = Walkover
- r = Retired
- d = Defaulted

=== Draw ===
Quarterfinals
1	(Netherlands) Jiske Griffioen	6	6
(Germany) Sabine Ellerbrock	1	3
(Netherlands) Marjolein Buis	1	6	3
(Japan) Yui Kamiji	6	4	6
(United States) Kaitlyn Verfuerth	3	1
(United Kingdom) Jordanne Whiley	6	6
(United Kingdom) Lucy Shuker	3	3
2	(Netherlands) Aniek van Koot	6	6

Semifinals
1	(Netherlands) Jiske Griffioen	5	6	4
(Japan) Yui Kamiji	7	3	6
(United Kingdom) Jordanne Whiley	6^{1}	6	6
2	(Netherlands) Aniek van Koot	7^{7}	4	3

Final
(Japan) Yui Kamiji	4	6	1
(United Kingdom) Jordanne Whiley	6	0	6
