= 2016 US Open – Boys' doubles =

Boys' doubles
- 2016 US Open

Final
- Champions: (Bolivia) Juan Carlos Aguilar (Brazil) Felipe Meligeni Alves
- Runners-up: (Canada) Félix Auger-Aliassime (Canada) Benjamin Sigouin
- Score: 6–3, 7–6^{(7–4)}

Events
Singles	men	women		boys	girls
Doubles	men	women	mixed	boys	girls
WC Singles	men	women	quad
WC Doubles	men	women	quad
Legends	men	women	mixed
- US Open

Félix Auger-Aliassime and Denis Shapovalov were the defending champions, however Shapovalov withdrew due to injury. Auger-Aliassime played alongside Benjamin Sigouin, but lost in the final to Juan Carlos Aguilar and Felipe Meligeni Alves, 3–6, 6–7^{(4–7)}.

== Seeds ==
1. (United States) Ulises Blanch / (Japan) Yosuke Watanuki (first round)
2. (Estonia) Kenneth Raisma / (Greece) Stefanos Tsitsipas (second round)
3. (Canada) Félix Auger-Aliassime / (Canada) Benjamin Sigouin (final)
4. (Serbia) Miomir Kecmanović / (Australia) Alexei Popyrin (quarterfinals)
5. (United States) John McNally / (United States) J. J. Wolf (first round)
6. (Germany) Marvin Möller / (Germany) Louis Wessels (second round)
7. (France) Elliot Benchetrit / (France) Geoffrey Blancaneaux (quarterfinals)
8. (Spain) Eduard Güell Bartrina / (Argentina) Genaro Alberto Olivieri (first round)

== Draw ==
Key

- Q = Qualifier
- WC = Wild card
- LL = Lucky loser
- Alt = Alternate
- ITF = ITF entry
- PR = Protected ranking
- SR = Special ranking
- SE = Special exempt
- JE = Junior exempt
- JR = Junior Accelerator Programme entrant
- CO = College Accelerator Programme entrant
- NG = Next Gen Accelerator Program entrant
- w/o = Walkover
- r = Retired
- d = Defaulted

=== Finals ===
Semifinals
(Japan) Toru Horie (Japan) Yuta Shimizu	6	4	[9]
3	(Canada) Félix Auger-Aliassime (Canada) Benjamin Sigouin	3	6	[11]
(Bolivia) Juan Carlos Aguilar (Brazil) Felipe Meligeni Alves	4	7^{7}	[10]
(Belgium) Zizou Bergs (Israel) Yshai Oliel	6	6^{1}	[2]

Final
3	(Canada) Félix Auger-Aliassime (Canada) Benjamin Sigouin	3	6^{4}
(Bolivia) Juan Carlos Aguilar (Brazil) Felipe Meligeni Alves	6	7^{7}

=== Top half ===
First round
1	(United States) Ulises Blanch (Japan) Yosuke Watanuki	4	6	[8]
WC	(United States) Sean Sculley (United States) Nick Stachiowak	6	2	[10]
(Egypt) Youssef Hossam (Turkey) Ergi Kırkın	1	6	[10]
(Italy) Liam Caruana (United States) Sam Riffice	6	1	[8]
(Chinese Taipei) Wu Tung-lin (China) Wu Yibing	3	4
(Germany) Rudolf Molleker (Uzbekistan) Khumoyun Sultonov	6	6
(Japan) Toru Horie (Japan) Yuta Shimizu	6	6^{6}	[10]
5	(United States) John McNally (United States) J. J. Wolf	1	7^{8}	[7]
3	(Canada) Félix Auger-Aliassime (Canada) Benjamin Sigouin	6	7^{7}
WC	(United States) Adam Neff (United States) Sangeet Sridhar	3	6^{5}
(Poland) Piotr Matuszewski (Poland) Kacper Żuk	6	1	[9]
(Brazil) Gabriel Décamps (Brazil) Orlando Luz	2	6	[11]
(France) Constantin Bittoun Kouzmine (Spain) Alejandro Davidovich Fokina	6	6^{1}	[12]
(United States) Olukayode Ayeni (Romania) Vlad Andrei Dancu	4	7^{7}	[14]
(United States) Brandon Holt (United States) Vasil Kirkov	1	5
7	(France) Elliot Benchetrit (France) Geoffrey Blancaneaux	6	7

Second round
WC	(United States) S Sculley (United States) N Stachiowak	3	6	[12]
(Egypt) Y Hossam (Turkey) E Kırkın	6	4	[10]
(Germany) R Molleker (Uzbekistan) K Sultonov	4	3
(Japan) T Horie (Japan) Y Shimizu	6	6
3	(Canada) F Auger-Aliassime (Canada) B Sigouin	6	7^{7}
(Brazil) G Décamps (Brazil) O Luz	2	6^{1}
(United States) O Ayeni (Romania) VA Dancu	6^{4}	7^{10}	[11]
7	(France) E Benchetrit (France) G Blancaneaux	7^{7}	6^{8}	[13]

Quarterfinals
WC	(United States) S Sculley (United States) N Stachiowak	3	6	[2]
(Japan) T Horie (Japan) Y Shimizu	6	2	[10]
3	(Canada) F Auger-Aliassime (Canada) B Sigouin	6	6
7	(France) E Benchetrit (France) G Blancaneaux	4	2

Semifinals
(Japan) T Horie (Japan) Y Shimizu	6	4	[9]
3	(Canada) F Auger-Aliassime (Canada) B Sigouin	3	6	[11]

=== Bottom half ===
First round
6	(Germany) Marvin Möller (Germany) Louis Wessels	6	6
(United States) Trent Bryde (United States) Gianni Ross	3	2
(Bolivia) Juan Carlos Aguilar (Brazil) Felipe Meligeni Alves	6	6
(Italy) Riccardo Balzerani (Italy) Enrico Dalla Valle	3	3
WC	(United States) Lukas Greif (United States) Keenan Mayo	4	6	[10]
(United Kingdom) Alastair Gray (Portugal) Duarte Vale	6	3	[8]
(Sweden) Jonas Eriksson Ziverts (Italy) Andrea Guerrieri	1	4
4	(Serbia) Miomir Kecmanović (Australia) Alexei Popyrin	6	6
8	(Spain) Eduard Güell Bartrina (Argentina) Genaro Alberto Olivieri	2	2
(Belgium) Zizou Bergs (Israel) Yshai Oliel	6	6
(United States) Oliver Crawford (United States) Patrick Kypson	7^{7}	7^{7}
(Philippines) Alberto Lim (Estonia) Mattias Siimar	6^{5}	6^{5}
(Australia) Alex De Minaur (Australia) Blake Ellis	3	6	[6]
(Chinese Taipei) Lo Chien-hsun (Hong Kong) Anthony Jackie Tang	6	3	[10]
(United Kingdom) Ryan James Storrie (France) Louis Tessa	0	1
2	(Estonia) Kenneth Raisma (Greece) Stefanos Tsitsipas	6	6

Second round
6	(Germany) M Möller (Germany) L Wessels	3	3
(Bolivia) JC Aguilar (Brazil) F Meligeni Alves	6	6
WC	(United States) L Greif (United States) K Mayo	4	4
4	(Serbia) M Kecmanović (Australia) A Popyrin	6	6
(Belgium) Z Bergs (Israel) Y Oliel	6	6^{6}	[12]
(United States) O Crawford (United States) P Kypson	4	7^{8}	[10]
(Chinese Taipei) C-h Lo (Hong Kong) AJ Tang	6	2	[10]
2	(Estonia) K Raisma (Greece) S Tsitsipas	3	6	[7]

Quarterfinals
(Bolivia) JC Aguilar (Brazil) F Meligeni Alves	6	6
4	(Serbia) M Kecmanović (Australia) A Popyrin	2	4
(Belgium) Z Bergs (Israel) Y Oliel	6^{0}	6	[10]
(Chinese Taipei) C-h Lo (Hong Kong) AJ Tang	7^{7}	4	[5]

Semifinals
(Bolivia) JC Aguilar (Brazil) F Meligeni Alves	4	7^{7}	[10]
(Belgium) Z Bergs (Israel) Y Oliel	6	6^{1}	[2]
