= 2017 US Open – Boys' doubles =

Boys' doubles
- 2017 US Open

Final
- Champions: (Chinese Taipei) Hsu Yu-hsiou (China) Wu Yibing
- Runners-up: (Japan) Toru Horie (Japan) Yuta Shimizu
- Score: 6–4, 5–7, [11–9]

Events
Singles	men	women		boys	girls
Doubles	men	women	mixed	boys	girls
WC Singles	men	women	quad
WC Doubles	men	women	quad
Legends	men	women	mixed
- US Open

Juan Carlos Aguilar and Felipe Meligeni Alves were the defending champions, but both players were ineligible to participate.

Hsu Yu-hsiou and Wu Yibing won the title, defeating Toru Horie and Yuta Shimizu in the final, 6–4, 5–7, [11–9].

== Seeds ==
1. (Chinese Taipei) Hsu Yu-hsiou / (China) Wu Yibing (champions)
2. (Austria) Jurij Rodionov / (Czech Republic) Michael Vrbenský (second round)
3. (United States) Trent Bryde / (Portugal) Duarte Vale (semifinals)
4. (United States) Oliver Crawford / (United States) Patrick Kypson (second round)
5. (Argentina) Sebastián Báez / (Brazil) Thiago Seyboth Wild (semifinals)
6. (Argentina) Axel Geller / (United States) Alexandre Rotsaert (quarterfinals)
7. (Israel) Yshai Oliel / (Russia) Alexey Zakharov (second round)
8. (United States) Sebastian Korda / (Colombia) Nicolás Mejía (first round)

== Draw ==
Key

- Q = Qualifier
- WC = Wild card
- LL = Lucky loser
- Alt = Alternate
- ITF = ITF entry
- PR = Protected ranking
- SR = Special ranking
- SE = Special exempt
- JE = Junior exempt
- JR = Junior Accelerator Programme entrant
- CO = College Accelerator Programme entrant
- NG = Next Gen Accelerator Program entrant
- w/o = Walkover
- r = Retired
- d = Defaulted

=== Finals ===
Semifinals
1	(Chinese Taipei) Hsu Yu-hsiou (China) Wu Yibing	6	6
5	(Argentina) Sebastián Báez (Brazil) Thiago Seyboth Wild	4	1
3	(United States) Trent Bryde (Portugal) Duarte Vale	2	6^{5}
(Japan) Toru Horie (Japan) Yuta Shimizu	6	7^{7}

Final
1	(Chinese Taipei) Hsu Yu-hsiou (China) Wu Yibing	6	5	[11]
(Japan) Toru Horie (Japan) Yuta Shimizu	4	7	[9]

=== Top half ===
First round
1	(Chinese Taipei) Hsu Yu-hsiou (China) Wu Yibing	6	7
(South Korea) Park Ui-sung (Japan) Naoki Tajima	3	5
WC	(United States) Ryan Goetz (United States) Axel Nefve	6	6
(Brazil) Gabriel Décamps (Mexico) Alan Fernando Rubio Fierros	3	4
(Italy) Francesco Forti (United Kingdom) Aidan McHugh	6	6
(Argentina) Juan Pablo Grassi Mazzuchi (Argentina) Thiago Agustín Tirante	3	3
(United Kingdom) Jack Draper (United Kingdom) George Loffhagen	5	1
6	(Argentina) Axel Geller (United States) Alexandre Rotsaert	7	6
4	(United States) Oliver Crawford (United States) Patrick Kypson	4	7	[10]
(Dominican Republic) Nick Hardt (Colombia) Sergio Luis Hernández Ramírez	6	5	[8]
(France) Dan Added (Belgium) Zizou Bergs	6	1	[10]
(United States) Vasil Kirkov (Czech Republic) Ondřej Štyler	2	6	[7]
(France) Cosntantin Bittoun Kouzmine (United States) Gianni Ross	3	3
(Czech Republic) Tomáš Macháč (Russia) Timofey Skatov	6	6
(United States) Sam Riffice (United States) Danny Thomas	6	6^{6}	[9]
5	(Argentina) Sebastián Báez (Brazil) Thiago Seyboth Wild	1	7^{8}	[11]

Second round
1	(Chinese Taipei) Y-h Hsu (China) Y Wu	6	7
WC	(United States) R Goetz (United States) A Nefve	2	5
(Italy) F Forti (United Kingdom) A McHugh	2	6	[8]
6	(Argentina) A Geller (United States) A Rotsaert	6	3	[10]
4	(United States) O Crawford (United States) P Kypson	3	3
(France) D Added (Belgium) Z Bergs	6	6
(Czech Republic) T Macháč (Russia) T Skatov	4	6	[10]
5	(Argentina) S Báez (Brazil) T Seyboth Wild	6	4	[12]

Quarterfinals
1	(Chinese Taipei) Y-h Hsu (China) Y Wu	4	6	[10]
6	(Argentina) A Geller (United States) A Rotsaert	6	3	[6]
(France) D Added (Belgium) Z Bergs	6	6^{6}	[8]
5	(Argentina) S Báez (Brazil) T Seyboth Wild	3	7^{8}	[10]

Semifinals
1	(Chinese Taipei) Y-h Hsu (China) Y Wu	6	6
5	(Argentina) S Báez (Brazil) T Seyboth Wild	4	1

=== Bottom half ===
First round
8	(United States) Sebastian Korda (Colombia) Nicolás Mejía	4	5
(Netherlands) Jesper de Jong (Netherlands) Ryan Nijboer	6	7
(India) Siddhant Banthia (Japan) Shinji Hazawa	3	6	[11]
WC	(United States) Lukas Greif (United States) Govind Nanda	6	3	[9]
(United States) Brian Cernoch (United States) Andrew Fenty	4	6	[9]
(Republic of Ireland) Simon Carr (Finland) Emil Ruusuvuori	6	4	[11]
(Tunisia) Mohamed Ali Bellalouna (France) Hugo Gaston	1	4
3	(United States) Trent Bryde (Portugal) Duarte Vale	6	6
7	(Israel) Yshai Oliel (Russia) Alexey Zakharov	6	7
(Brazil) Igor Gimenez (Brazil) Matheus Pucinelli de Almeida	4	5
WC	(United States) Brian Shi (United States) Sangeet Sridhar	1	4
(United States) Alafia Ayeni (Switzerland) Jakub Paul	6	6
(Cyprus) Menelaos Efstathiou (Serbia) Marko Miladinović	4	3
(Japan) Toru Horie (Japan) Yuta Shimizu	6	6
WC	(United States) William Grant (United States) Tyler Zink	4	6^{3}
2	(Austria) Jurij Rodionov (Czech Republic) Michael Vrbenský	6	7^{7}

Second round
(Netherlands) J de Jong (Netherlands) R Nijboer	7^{7}	2	[12]
(India) S Banthia (Japan) S Hazawa	6^{2}	6	[10]
(Republic of Ireland) S Carr (Finland) E Ruusuvuori	2	1
3	(United States) T Bryde (Portugal) D Vale	6	6
7	(Israel) Y Oliel (Russia) A Zakharov	2	4
(United States) A Ayeni (Switzerland) J Paul	6	6
(Japan) T Horie (Japan) Y Shimizu	6	7
2	(Austria) J Rodionov (Czech Republic) M Vrbenský	1	5

Quarterfinals
(Netherlands) J de Jong (Netherlands) R Nijboer	2	4
3	(United States) T Bryde (Portugal) D Vale	6	6
(United States) A Ayeni (Switzerland) J Paul	2	6^{7}
(Japan) T Horie (Japan) Y Shimizu	6	7^{9}

Semifinals
3	(United States) T Bryde (Portugal) D Vale	2	6^{5}
(Japan) T Horie (Japan) Y Shimizu	6	7^{7}
