= 2017 US Open – Wheelchair women's doubles =

Wheelchair women's doubles
- 2017 US Open

Final
- Champions: (Netherlands) Marjolein Buis (Netherlands) Diede de Groot
- Runners-up: (United States) Dana Mathewson (Netherlands) Aniek van Koot
- Score: 6–4, 6–3

Events
Singles	men	women		boys	girls
Doubles	men	women	mixed	boys	girls
WC Singles	men	women	quad
WC Doubles	men	women	quad
Legends	men	women	mixed
← 2015 ·	US Open	· 2018 →

Marjolein Buis and Diede de Groot defeated the defending champion Aniek Van Koot and her partner Dana Mathewson in the final, 6–4, 6–3 to win the women's doubles wheelchair tennis title at the 2017 US Open.

Jiske Griffioen and van Koot were the reigning champions from when the event was last held in 2015, due to a scheduling conflict with the 2016 Summer Paralympics. However, Griffioen did not participate this year.

== Seeds ==
1. (Netherlands) Marjolein Buis / (Netherlands) Diede de Groot (champions)
2. (Japan) Yui Kamiji / (United Kingdom) Lucy Shuker (semifinals)

== Draw ==
=== Key ===
- Q = Qualifier
- WC = Wild card
- LL = Lucky loser
- Alt = Alternate
- ITF = ITF entry
- PR = Protected ranking
- SR = Special ranking
- SE = Special exempt
- JE = Junior exempt
- JR = Junior Accelerator Programme entrant
- CO = College Accelerator Programme entrant
- NG = Next Gen Accelerator Program entrant
- w/o = Walkover
- r = Retired
- d = Defaulted

=== Bracket ===
Semifinals
1	(Netherlands) Marjolein Buis (Netherlands) Diede de Groot	6	6
(Germany) Sabine Ellerbrock (South Africa) Kgothatso Montjane	3	2
(United States) Dana Mathewson (Netherlands) Aniek van Koot	0	6	[10]
2	(Japan) Yui Kamiji (United Kingdom) Lucy Shuker	6	4	[5]

Final
1	(Netherlands) Marjolein Buis (Netherlands) Diede de Groot	6	6
(United States) Dana Mathewson (Netherlands) Aniek van Koot	4	3
