= 2017 US Open – Boys' singles =

Boys' singles
- 2017 US Open

Final
- Champion: (China) Wu Yibing
- Runner-up: (Argentina) Axel Geller
- Score: 6–4, 6–4

Events
Singles	men	women		boys	girls
Doubles	men	women	mixed	boys	girls
WC Singles	men	women	quad
WC Doubles	men	women	quad
Legends	men	women	mixed
- US Open

Félix Auger-Aliassime was the defending champion, but chose not to participate.

Wu Yibing won the title, defeating Axel Geller in the final, 6–4, 6–4.

== Seeds ==
1. (Argentina) Axel Geller (final)
2. (China) Wu Yibing (champion)
3. (Austria) Jurij Rodionov (second round)
4. (Japan) Yuta Shimizu (first round)
5. (Serbia) Marko Miladinović (second round)
6. (Israel) Yshai Oliel (second round)
7. (United States) Trent Bryde (second round)
8. (Chinese Taipei) Hsu Yu-hsiou (second round)
9. (Czech Republic) Michael Vrbenský (first round)
10. (Argentina) Sebastián Báez (quarterfinals)
11. (United States) Oliver Crawford (quarterfinals)
12. (United States) Patrick Kypson (first round)
13. (United States) Sebastian Korda (second round)
14. (Brazil) Thiago Seyboth Wild (first round)
15. (Portugal) Duarte Vale (third round)
16. (Argentina) Juan Pablo Grassi Mazzuchi (first round)

== Main draw ==
Key

- Q = Qualifier
- WC = Wild card
- LL = Lucky loser
- Alt = Alternate
- ITF = ITF entry
- PR = Protected ranking
- SR = Special ranking
- SE = Special exempt
- JE = Junior exempt
- JR = Junior Accelerator Programme entrant
- CO = College Accelerator Programme entrant
- NG = Next Gen Accelerator Program entrant
- w/o = Walkover
- r = Retired
- d = Defaulted

=== Finals ===
Quarterfinals
1	(Argentina) Axel Geller	6	6^{8}	6
(Japan) Naoki Tajima	3	7^{10}	4
(Russia) Timofey Skatov	6	6
(United States) Danny Thomas	3	1
10	(Argentina) Sebastián Báez	6^{5}	4
(Finland) Emil Ruusuvuori	7^{7}	6
11	(United States) Oliver Crawford	6	3	3
2	(China) Wu Yibing	4	6	6

Semifinals
1	(Argentina) Axel Geller	6	7^{9}
(Russia) Timofey Skatov	1	6^{7}
(Finland) Emil Ruusuvuori	6	3	6^{4}
2	(China) Wu Yibing	4	6	7^{7}

Final
1	(Argentina) Axel Geller	4	4
2	(China) Wu Yibing	6	6

=== Top half ===
==== Section 1 ====
First round
1	(Argentina) Axel Geller	6	6
(United States) Andrew Fenty	3	4
WC	(United States) Brandon Nakashima	6	6
SE	(Brazil) Matheus Pucinelli de Almeida	1	4
(United States) Alexandre Rotsaert	6	6
(Tunisia) Mohamed Ali Bellalouna	2	3
(Colombia) Nicolás Mejía	4	4
15	(Portugal) Duarte Vale	6	6
9	(Czech Republic) Michael Vrbenský	7	4	2
(Japan) Naoki Tajima	5	6	6
(France) Hugo Gaston	3	6	6
WC	(United States) Lukas Greif	6	2	1
(Italy) Francesco Forti	6	2	6^{5}
(Cyprus) Menelaos Efstathiou	2	6	7^{7}
Q	(Dominican Republic) Nick Hardt	3	4
7	(United States) Trent Bryde	6	6

Second round
1	(Argentina) A Geller	7	6
WC	(United States) B Nakashima	5	4
(United States) A Rotsaert	4	1
15	(Portugal) D Vale	6	6
(Japan) N Tajima	6	2	7^{7}
(France) H Gaston	1	6	6^{4}
(Cyprus) M Efstathiou	6	6
7	(United States) T Bryde	4	2

Third round
1	(Argentina) A Geller	7^{7}	6
15	(Portugal) D Vale	6^{2}	2
(Japan) N Tajima	6	6^{1}	6
(Cyprus) M Efstathiou	0	7^{7}	3

Quarterfinals
1	(Argentina) A Geller	6	6^{8}	6
(Japan) N Tajima	3	7^{10}	4

==== Section 2 ====
First round
3	(Austria) Jurij Rodionov	7^{8}	3	6
(United States) Brian Cernoch	6^{6}	6	4
(Russia) Timofey Skatov	7^{7}	6
(Japan) Shinji Hazawa	6^{4}	1
(Republic of Ireland) Simon Carr	7^{7}	6
WC	(United States) Sangeet Sridhar	6^{0}	4
WC	(France) Jaimee Floyd Angele	4	6	6
16	(Argentina) Juan Pablo Grassi Mazzuchi	6	2	2
12	(United States) Patrick Kypson	1	3
Q	(United Kingdom) George Loffhagen	6	6
(Netherlands) Ryan Nijboer	6	6
(Czech Republic) Ondřej Štyler	4	4
(India) Siddhant Bhantia	1	2
(United States) Danny Thomas	6	6
WC	(United States) Brian Shi	4	4
8	(Chinese Taipei) Hsu Yu-hsiou	6	6

Second round
3	(Austria) J Rodionov	3	2
(Russia) T Skatov	6	6
(Republic of Ireland) S Carr	6	6
WC	(France) JF Angele	4	4
Q	(United Kingdom) G Loffhagen	6	6
(Netherlands) R Nijboer	0	3
(United States) D Thomas	6	6
8	(Chinese Taipei) Y-h Hsu	2	4

Third round
(Russia) T Skatov	7	2	6
(Republic of Ireland) S Carr	5	6	1
Q	(United Kingdom) G Loffhagen	1	6^{5}
(United States) D Thomas	6	7^{7}

Quarterfinals
(Russia) T Skatov	6	6
(United States) D Thomas	3	1

=== Bottom half ===
==== Section 3 ====
First round
5	(Serbia) Marko Miladinović	6	6
Q	(Colombia) Sergio Luis Hernández Ramírez	3	2
WC	(United States) Trey Hilderbrand	4	6	7
(Russia) Alexey Zakharov	6	4	5
(France) Constantin Bittoun Kouzmine	6	3	4
(United States) Alafia Ayeni	3	6	6
(Brazil) Gabriel Décamps	6	3	4
10	(Argentina) Sebastián Báez	4	6	6
13	(United States) Sebastian Korda	6	6
Q	(United Kingdom) Jack Draper	2	2
(Finland) Emil Ruusuvuori	6	6
Q	(United States) Govind Nanda	2	3
(Belgium) Zizou Bergs	6^{3}	7^{7}	3
(Czech Republic) Tomáš Macháč	7^{7}	6^{4}	6
(United States) Sam Riffice	6	6
4	(Japan) Yuta Shimizu	3	2

Second round
5	(Serbia) M Miladinović	6	1	2
WC	(United States) T Hilderbrand	1	6	6
(United States) A Ayeni	4	4
10	(Argentina) S Báez	6	6
13	(United States) S Korda	3	3
(Finland) E Ruusuvuori	6	6
(Czech Republic) T Macháč	3	0
(United States) S Riffice	6	6

Third round
WC	(United States) T Hilderbrand	6	2	5
10	(Argentina) S Báez	4	6	7
(Finland) E Ruusuvuori	4	6	6
(United States) S Riffice	6	4	2

Quarterfinals
10	(Argentina) S Báez	6^{5}	4
(Finland) E Ruusuvuori	7^{7}	6

==== Section 4 ====
First round
6	(Israel) Yshai Oliel	6	6
WC	(United States) Ryan Goetz	4	4
(United States) Gianni Ross	6	4	2
(South Korea) Park Ui-sung	3	6	6
Q	(France) Clément Tabur	3	3
(Mexico) Alan Fernando Rubio Fierros	6	6
(United Kingdom) Aidan McHugh	4	6	4
11	(United States) Oliver Crawford	6	3	6
14	(Brazil) Thiago Seyboth Wild	5	6	4
Q	(Switzerland) Jakub Paul	7	3	6
(United States) Vasil Kirkov	3	6	6
(Japan) Toru Horie	6	4	1
WC	(United States) Axel Nefve	6	5	0
Q	(Netherlands) Jesper de Jong	1	7	6
(France) Dan Added	3	4
2	(China) Wu Yibing	6	6

Second round
6	(Israel) Y Oliel	7	4	0
(South Korea) U-s Park	5	6	6
(Mexico) AF Rubio Fierros	2	6	4
11	(United States) O Crawford	6	4	6
Q	(Switzerland) J Paul	6	6
(United States) V Kirkov	3	4
Q	(Netherlands) J de Jong	1	1
2	(China) Y Wu	6	6

Third round
(South Korea) U-s Park	2	2
11	(United States) O Crawford	6	6
Q	(Switzerland) J Paul	3	5
2	(China) Y Wu	6	7

Quarterfinals
11	(United States) O Crawford	6	3	3
2	(China) Y Wu	4	6	6

== Qualifying ==
=== Seeds ===
1. (United Kingdom) Barnaby Smith (first round)
2. (Turkey) Ergi Kırkın (qualifying competition)
3. (Romania) Ștefan Paloși (qualifying competition)
4. (Argentina) Thiago Agustín Tirante (first round)
5. (France) Clément Tabur (qualified)
6. (United Kingdom) George Loffhagen (qualified)
7. (Brazil) Igor Gimenez (qualifying competition)
8. (Turkey) Kaya Göre (first round)
9. (Colombia) Sergio Luis Hernández Ramírez (qualified)
10. (Switzerland) Jakub Paul (qualified)
11. (Italy) Lorenzo Musetti (qualifying competition)
12. (Italy) Mattia Frinzi (first round)
13. (Japan) Taisei Ichikawa (first round)
14. (India) Nitin Kumar Sinha (first round)
15. (United Kingdom) Jack Draper (qualified)
16. (Mexico) Alex Hernández (qualifying competition)

=== Qualifiers ===
1. (Netherlands) Jesper de Jong
2. (Switzerland) Jakub Paul
3. (Colombia) Sergio Luis Hernández Ramírez
4. (United States) Govind Nanda
5. (France) Clément Tabur
6. (United Kingdom) George Loffhagen
7. (United Kingdom) Jack Draper
8. (Dominican Republic) Nick Hardt

=== Draw ===
==== First qualifier ====
First round
1	(United Kingdom) Barnaby Smith	2	6	5
(Netherlands) Jesper de Jong	6	4	7
(Australia) Thomas Bosancic	6	7^{7}
13	(Japan) Taisei Ichikawa	3	6^{4}

Qualifying competition
(Netherlands) Jesper de Jong	6	6
(Australia) Thomas Bosancic	2	4

==== Second qualifier ====
First round
2	(Turkey) Ergi Kırkın	4	6	6
WC	(United States) Garrett Johns	6	3	2
(Brazil) João Lucas Reis da Silva	1	2
10	(Switzerland) Jakub Paul	6	6

Qualifying competition
2	(Turkey) Ergi Kırkın	5	6	4
10	(Switzerland) Jakub Paul	7	2	6

==== Third qualifier ====
First round
3	(Romania) Ștefan Paloși	6	6
WC	(United States) Tyler Zink	3	3
(Japan) Ryuki Matsuda	6	3	4
9	(Colombia) Sergio Luis Hernández Ramírez	4	6	6

Qualifying competition
3	(Romania) Ștefan Paloși	6	3	4
9	(Colombia) Sergio Luis Hernández Ramírez	3	6	6

==== Fourth qualifier ====
First round
4	(Argentina) Thiago Agustín Tirante	6	1	0
WC	(United States) Govind Nanda	0	6	6
(New Zealand) Ajeet Rai	4	5
11	(Italy) Lorenzo Musetti	6	7

Qualifying competition
WC	(United States) Govind Nanda	6	6^{5}	6
11	(Italy) Lorenzo Musetti	3	7^{7}	1

==== Fifth qualifier ====
First round
5	(France) Clément Tabur	6	6
(Japan) James Kent Trotter	4	4
WC	(United States) William Grant	6	7^{7}
12	(Italy) Mattia Frinzi	2	6^{4}

Qualifying competition
5	(France) Clément Tabur	6^{7}	6	6
WC	(United States) William Grant	7^{9}	2	3

==== Sixth qualifier ====
First round
6	(United Kingdom) George Loffhagen	6	3	6
(Brazil) Gilbert Soares Klier Júnior	3	6	4
(Netherlands) Len Schouten	0	2
16	(Mexico) Alex Hernández	6	6

Qualifying competition
6	(United Kingdom) George Loffhagen	6	1	6
16	(Mexico) Alex Hernández	2	6	1

==== Seventh qualifier ====
First round
7	(Brazil) Igor Gimenez	7^{9}	7
(Philippines) John Bryan Decasa Otico	6^{7}	5
WC	(Japan) Yuta Kikuchi	6	4	2
15	(United Kingdom) Jack Draper	1	6	6

Qualifying competition
7	(Brazil) Igor Gimenez	4	2
15	(United Kingdom) Jack Draper	6	6

==== Eighth qualifier ====
First round
8	(Turkey) Kaya Göre	2	3
WC	(United States) Tristan Boyer	6	6
(Dominican Republic) Nick Hardt	6	6
14	(India) Nitin Kumar Sinha	4	3

Qualifying competition
WC	(United States) Tristan Boyer	7	6^{4}	3
(Dominican Republic) Nick Hardt	5	7^{7}	6
