= Hurricane Tyra Black =

American tennis player

- Country (sports): United States
- Born: March 2, 2001 (age 25)
- Plays: Right-handed
- Prize money: US$ 35,280

Singles
- Career record: 87–44
- Career titles: 5 ITF
- Highest ranking: No. 331 (November 7, 2022)

Doubles
- Career record: 27–27
- Career titles: 2 ITF
- Highest ranking: No. 640 (November 21, 2022)

Hurricane Tyra Black (born March 2, 2001) is an American pickleball player and inactive tennis player. She is the sister of Tornado Alicia Black.

== Early life ==
Tyra Hurricane and Alicia "Tornado" Black are the children of Sylvester Black, who played for the Jamaican Davis Cup team, and Gayal Black. At the age of three, Black was nicknamed "Hurricane" because her parents attempted to make them more marketable as professional tennis players.

== Career ==
She was coached in tennis by Rick Macci.

Despite this, her only title on the ITF Women's World Tennis Tour came on clay in Antalya, Turkey. She won the doubles tournament alongside Swiss tennis player Svenja Ochsner in December 2020. The deciding tiebreaker of the quarterfinal against the Turkish/Croatian duo of Cemre Anil and Ena Kajevica saw Black and Ochsner winning 11–9. In the final, the pair defeated Gergana Topalova and Daniela Vismane in straight sets. This was Black's first ITF title, winning $478 in prize money.

In 2022, Black won two 15k professional singles titles within a span of three weeks, both in Antalya.

== ITF Circuit finals ==
Legend
$25,000 tournaments
$15,000 tournaments

=== Singles: 7 (5 titles, 2 runner-ups) ===
Result	W–L	Date	Tournament	Tier	Surface	Opponent	Score
Loss	0–1	Nov 2019	ITF Hua Hin, Thailand	25,000	Hard	(Netherlands) Lesley Pattinama Kerkhove	3–6, 4–6
Win	1–1	Jun 2021	ITF Antalya, Turkey	15,000	Clay	(Italy) Federica Bilardo	2–6, 6–4, 6–4
Loss	1–2	Nov 2021	ITF Cundinamarca, Colombia	15,000	Clay	(Colombia) María Herazo González	6–7^{(5)}, 6–3, 6–7^{(3)}
Win	2–2	Nov 2021	ITF Guatemala City	15,000	Clay	(United States) Olivia Lincer	7–5, 6–3
Win	3–2	Jan 2022	ITF Antalya, Turkey	15,000	Clay	(Czech Republic) Barbora Palicová	6–0, 6–4
Win	4–2	Feb 2022	ITF Antalya, Turkey	15,000	Clay	(Turkey) Ilay Yörük	6–2, 4–6, 6–4
Win	5–2	Jun 2022	ITF Santo Domingo, Dominican Republic	25,000	Hard	(Belarus) Jana Kolodynska	6–3, 6–3

=== Doubles: 5 (2 titles, 3 runner-ups) ===
Result	W–L	Date	Tournament	Tier	Surface	Partner	Opponents	Score
Win	1–0	Dec 2020	ITF Antalya, Turkey	15,000	Clay	(Switzerland) Svenja Ochsner	(Bulgaria) Gergana Topalova (Latvia) Daniela Vismane	7–6^{(2)}, 7–5
Win	2–0	Nov 2021	ITF Cundinamarca, Colombia	15,000	Clay	(United States) Rushri Wijesundera	(Chile) Fernanda Astete (Colombia) Jessica Plazas	7–6^{(11)}, 5–7, [10–4]
Loss	2–1	Nov 2021	ITF Guatemala City	15,000	Clay	(Chile) Fernanda Astete	(United States) Paris Corley (United States) Lexington Reed	6–4, 6–7^{(1)}, [5–10]
Loss	2–2	Jan 2023	ITF Antalya, Turkey	15,000	Clay	(United States) Qavia Lopez	(Russia) Daria Lodikova (Russia) Ekaterina Ovcharenko	2–6, 3–6
Loss	2–3	Jan 2023	ITF Antalya, Turkey	15,000	Clay	(Turkey) Doga Turkmen	(Russia) Polina Leykina (Russia) Ekaterina Ovcharenko	2–6, 6–3, [4–10]
