= 2014 Tashkent Open =

- Date: September 8–13
- Edition: 16th
- Category: WTA International
- Draw: 32S / 16D
- Prize money: $250,000
- Surface: Hard
- Location: Tashkent, Uzbekistan

Champions

Singles
- (Italy) Karin Knapp

Doubles
- (Serbia) Aleksandra Krunić / (Czech Republic) Kateřina Siniaková
← 2013 ·	Tashkent Open	· 2015 →

The 2014 Tashkent Open was a WTA International women's tennis tournament played on outdoor hard courts. It was the 16th edition of the Tashkent Open, on the 2014 WTA Tour. It took place at the Tashkent Tennis Center in Tashkent, Uzbekistan, between September 8–13, 2014. Third-seeded Karin Knapp won the singles title.

== Finals ==
=== Singles ===
(Italy) Karin Knapp defeated (Serbia) Bojana Jovanovski, 6–2, 7–6^{(7–4)}

- It was Knapp's only singles title of the year and the 1st of her career.

=== Doubles ===
(Serbia) Aleksandra Krunić / (Czech Republic) Kateřina Siniaková defeated (Russia) Margarita Gasparyan / (Russia) Alexandra Panova, 6–2, 6–1

== Points and prize money ==
=== Point distribution ===
Event	W	F	SF	QF	Round of 16	Round of 32	Q	Q2	Q1
Singles	280	180	110	60	30	1	18	12	1
Doubles	280	180	110	60	1	—	—	—	—

=== Prize money ===
Event	W	F	SF	QF	Round of 16	Round of 32^{1}	Q2	Q1
Singles	$43,000	$21,400	$11,500	$6,200	$3,420	$2,220	$1,285	$750
Doubles	$12,300	$6,400	$3,435	$1,820	$960	—	—	—
Doubles prize money per team

_{^{1} Qualifiers prize money is also the Round of 32 prize money}

== Singles main-draw entrants ==
Country	Player	Rank^{1}	Seed
SRB	Bojana Jovanovski	36	1
ROU	Irina-Camelia Begu	61	2
ITA	Karin Knapp	71	3
ESP	Lara Arruabarrena	75	4
CRO	Donna Vekić	79	5
JPN	Misaki Doi	90	6
GER	Anna-Lena Friedsam	100	7
MNE	Danka Kovinić	106	8

- ^{1} Rankings as of August 25, 2014

=== Other entrants ===
The following players received wildcards into the singles main draw:

- (Uzbekistan) Nigina Abduraimova
- (Uzbekistan) Akgul Amanmuradova
- (Latvia) Jeļena Ostapenko

The following players received entry from the qualifying draw:

- (Russia) Margarita Gasparyan
- (Ukraine) Lyudmyla Kichenok
- (Ukraine) Lesia Tsurenko
- (Ukraine) Maryna Zanevska

The following player received entry by a protected ranking:

- (Ukraine) Kateryna Bondarenko

=== Withdrawals ===
Before the tournament

- (Switzerland) Stefanie Vögele → replaced by (Ukraine) Kateryna Kozlova

== Doubles main-draw entrants ==
=== Seeds ===
Country	Player	Country	Player	Rank^{1}	Seed
CRO	Darija Jurak	USA	Megan Moulton-Levy	115	1
JPN	Misaki Doi	GEO	Oksana Kalashnikova	168	2
UKR	Lyudmyla Kichenok	UKR	Nadiia Kichenok	182	3
BLR	Olga Govortsova	POL	Klaudia Jans-Ignacik	184	4

- ^{1} Rankings as of August 25, 2014

=== Other entrants ===
The following pairs received wildcards into the doubles main draw:

- (Uzbekistan) Vlada Ekshibarova / (Uzbekistan) Arina Folts
- (Serbia) Jovana Jakšić / (Uzbekistan) Sabina Sharipova
