= 2014 Tashkent Open – Doubles =

Doubles
- 2014 Tashkent Open

Final
- Champions: (Serbia) Aleksandra Krunić (Czech Republic) Kateřina Siniaková
- Runners-up: (Russia) Margarita Gasparyan (Russia) Alexandra Panova
- Score: 6–2, 6–1

Details
- Draw: 16
- Seeds: 4

Events
Singles	Doubles
← 2013 ·	Tashkent Open	· 2015 →

Tímea Babos and Yaroslava Shvedova were the defending champions; however, both players chose not to participate.

Aleksandra Krunić and Kateřina Siniaková won their first main circuit title by defeating Margarita Gasparyan and Alexandra Panova in the final, 6–2, 6–1.

== Seeds ==
1. (Croatia) Darija Jurak / (United States) Megan Moulton-Levy (quarterfinals)
2. (Japan) Misaki Doi / (Georgia (country)) Oksana Kalashnikova (first round)
3. (Ukraine) Lyudmyla Kichenok / (Ukraine) Nadiia Kichenok (first round)
4. (Belarus) Olga Govortsova / (Poland) Klaudia Jans-Ignacik (first round)

== Draw ==
=== Key ===
- Q = Qualifier
- WC = Wild card
- LL = Lucky loser
- Alt = Alternate
- SE = Special exempt
- PR = Protected ranking
- ITF = ITF entry
- JE = Junior exempt
- w/o = Walkover
- r = Retired
- d = Defaulted
- SR = Special ranking

=== Draw ===
First round
1	(Croatia) D Jurak (United States) M Moulton-Levy	6	6
(Japan) E Hozumi (Japan) H Kuwata	1	4
(Russia) M Gasparyan (Russia) A Panova	6	6
(Turkey) Ç Büyükakçay (Ukraine) K Kozlova	1	0
4	(Belarus) O Govortsova (Poland) K Jans-Ignacik	3	4
(Romania) I-C Begu (Italy) K Knapp	6	6
(Serbia) B Jovanovski (Montenegro) D Kovinić	6	6
(Romania) E Bogdan (Australia) O Rogowska	4	2
WC	(Uzbekistan) V Ekshibarova (Uzbekistan) A Folts	3	2
(Belarus) E Dzehalevich (Belarus) A Sasnovich	6	6
(Uzbekistan) A Amanmuradova (Ukraine) K Bondarenko	7	7^{7}
3	(Ukraine) L Kichenok (Ukraine) N Kichenok	5	6^{5}
(Spain) L Arruabarrena (Luxembourg) M Minella	6	4	[10]
WC	(Serbia) J Jakšić (Uzbekistan) S Sharipova	2	6	[4]
(Serbia) A Krunić (Czech Republic) K Siniaková	6	3	[13]
2	(Japan) M Doi (Georgia (country)) O Kalashnikova	2	6	[11]

Quarterfinals
1	(Croatia) D Jurak (United States) M Moulton-Levy	3	3
(Russia) M Gasparyan (Russia) A Panova	6	6
(Romania) I-C Begu (Italy) K Knapp	7	4	[10]
(Serbia) B Jovanovski (Montenegro) D Kovinić	5	6	[7]
(Belarus) E Dzehalevich (Belarus) A Sasnovich	1	2
(Uzbekistan) A Amanmuradova (Ukraine) K Bondarenko	6	6
(Spain) L Arruabarrena (Luxembourg) M Minella	6^{5}	6	[2]
(Serbia) A Krunić (Czech Republic) K Siniaková	7^{7}	3	[10]

Semifinals
(Russia) M Gasparyan (Russia) A Panova	7^{7}	6
(Romania) I-C Begu (Italy) K Knapp	6^{4}	2
(Uzbekistan) A Amanmuradova (Ukraine) K Bondarenko	6	4	[8]
(Serbia) A Krunić (Czech Republic) K Siniaková	4	6	[10]

Final
(Russia) M Gasparyan (Russia) A Panova	2	1
(Serbia) A Krunić (Czech Republic) K Siniaková	6	6
