= 2014 Tashkent Open – Singles =

Singles
- 2014 Tashkent Open

Final
- Champion: (Italy) Karin Knapp
- Runner-up: (Serbia) Bojana Jovanovski
- Score: 6–2, 7–6^{(7–4)}

Details
- Draw: 32
- Seeds: 8

Events
| Singles | Doubles |
- Tashkent Open

Bojana Jovanovski was the defending champion, but she lost in the final to Karin Knapp who won her first WTA title without losing a set.

== Seeds ==
1. (Serbia) Bojana Jovanovski (final)
2. (Romania) Irina-Camelia Begu (second round)
3. (Italy) Karin Knapp (champion)
4. (Spain) Lara Arruabarrena (first round)
5. (Croatia) Donna Vekić (second round)
6. (Japan) Misaki Doi (second round)
7. (Germany) Anna-Lena Friedsam (first round)
8. (Montenegro) Danka Kovinić (first round)

== Draw ==
Key

- Q = Qualifier
- WC = Wild card
- LL = Lucky loser
- Alt = Alternate
- ITF = ITF entry
- PR = Protected ranking
- SR = Special ranking
- SE = Special exempt
- JE = Junior exempt
- JR = Junior Accelerator Programme entrant
- CO = College Accelerator Programme entrant
- NG = Next Gen Accelerator Program entrant
- w/o = Walkover
- r = Retired
- d = Defaulted

=== Finals ===
Semifinals
1 | (Serbia) Bojana Jovanovski | 6 | 7
WC | (Uzbekistan) Nigina Abduraimova | 4 | 5
3 | (Italy) Karin Knapp | 6 | 6
Q | (Ukraine) Lesia Tsurenko | 3 | 3

Final
1 | (Serbia) Bojana Jovanovski | 2 | 6^{4}
3 | (Italy) Karin Knapp | 6 | 7^{7}

=== Top half ===
First round
1 | (Serbia) B Jovanovski | 1 | 6 | 6
PR | (Ukraine) K Bondarenko | 6 | 4 | 1
Q | (Ukraine) M Zanevska | 4 | 6 | 3
(Russia) A Kudryavtseva | 6 | 2 | 6
(Serbia) V Dolonc | 2 | 2
(Poland) U Radwańska | 6 | 6
(Luxembourg) M Minella | 5 | 0
5 | (Croatia) D Vekić | 7 | 6
4 | (Spain) L Arruabarrena | 5 | 4
WC | (Uzbekistan) N Abduraimova | 7 | 6
(Slovakia) K Kučová | 1 | 6^{4}
(Russia) A Panova | 6 | 7^{7}
(Serbia) J Jakšić | 4 | 6 | 2
WC | (Uzbekistan) A Amanmuradova | 6 | 2 | 6
Q | (Ukraine) L Kichenok | 7^{7} | 7^{7}
8 | (Montenegro) D Kovinić | 6^{5} | 6^{2}

Second round
1 | (Serbia) B Jovanovski | 7^{8} | 3 | 6
(Russia) A Kudryavtseva | 6^{6} | 6 | 3
(Poland) U Radwańska | 6 | 6
5 | (Croatia) D Vekić | 3 | 3
WC | (Uzbekistan) N Abduraimova | 2 | 6 | 6
(Russia) A Panova | 6 | 3 | 4
WC | (Uzbekistan) A Amanmuradova | 6 | 6
Q | (Ukraine) L Kichenok | 1 | 2

Quarterfinals
1 | (Serbia) B Jovanovski | 4 | 6 | 6
(Poland) U Radwańska | 6 | 4 | 3
WC | (Uzbekistan) N Abduraimova | 6 | 6
WC | (Uzbekistan) A Amanmuradova | 3 | 3

Semifinals
1 | (Serbia) B Jovanovski | 6 | 7
WC | (Uzbekistan) N Abduraimova | 4 | 5

=== Bottom half ===
First round
6 | (Japan) M Doi | 6 | 6
(Czech Republic) K Siniaková | 4 | 3
(Belarus) O Govortsova | 6 | 6
Q | (Russia) M Gasparyan | 3 | 4
(Australia) O Rogowska | 6 | 4 | 4
(Belarus) A Sasnovich | 3 | 6 | 6
(Turkey) Ç Büyükakçay | 2 | 6^{3}
3 | (Italy) K Knapp | 6 | 7^{7}
7 | (Germany) A-L Friedsam | 6^{4} | 0
(Russia) K Pervak | 7^{7} | 6
(Israel) S Pe'er | 3 | 5
WC | (Latvia) J Ostapenko | 6 | 7
(Serbia) A Krunić | 2 | 6 | 2
Q | (Ukraine) L Tsurenko | 6 | 3 | 6
(Ukraine) K Kozlova | 3 | 1
2 | (Romania) I-C Begu | 6 | 6

Second round
6 | (Japan) M Doi | 6 | 3 | 3
(Belarus) O Govortsova | 4 | 6 | 6
(Belarus) A Sasnovich | 2 | 3
3 | (Italy) K Knapp | 6 | 6
(Russia) K Pervak | 6 | 7^{7}
WC | (Latvia) J Ostapenko | 2 | 6^{3}
Q | (Ukraine) L Tsurenko | 3 | 6 | 7^{7}
2 | (Romania) I-C Begu | 6 | 1 | 6^{3}

Quarterfinals
(Belarus) O Govortsova | 5 | 2
3 | (Italy) K Knapp | 7 | 6
(Russia) K Pervak | 6 | 4 | 5
Q | (Ukraine) L Tsurenko | 4 | 6 | 7

Semifinals
3 | (Italy) K Knapp | 6 | 6
Q | (Ukraine) L Tsurenko | 3 | 3

== Qualifying ==
=== Seeds ===
1. (Ukraine) Lesia Tsurenko (qualified)
2. (Kazakhstan) Yulia Putintseva (first round)
3. (Ukraine) Maryna Zanevska (qualified)
4. (Russia) Marta Sirotkina (first round)
5. (Ukraine) Nadiia Kichenok (qualifying competition)
6. (Japan) Hiroko Kuwata (qualifying competition)
7. (Ukraine) Lyudmyla Kichenok (qualified)
8. (Japan) Risa Ozaki (qualifying competition)

=== Qualifiers ===
1. (Ukraine) Lesia Tsurenko
2. (Ukraine) Lyudmyla Kichenok
3. (Ukraine) Maryna Zanevska
4. (Russia) Margarita Gasparyan

=== Qualifying draw ===
==== First qualifier ====
First round
1 | (Ukraine) Lesia Tsurenko | 6 | 6
(Russia) Ksenia Lykina | 3 | 2
WC | (Bulgaria) Ani Vangelova | 1 | 0
6 | (Japan) Hiroko Kuwata | 6 | 6

Qualifying competition
1 | (Ukraine) Lesia Tsurenko | 6 | 6
6 | (Japan) Hiroko Kuwata | 0 | 4

==== Second qualifier ====
First round
2 | (Kazakhstan) Yulia Putintseva | 6 | 4 | 0
(Georgia (country)) Oksana Kalashnikova | 4 | 6 | 6
WC | (Uzbekistan) Arina Folts | 4 | 5
7 | (Ukraine) Lyudmyla Kichenok | 6 | 7

Qualifying competition
(Georgia (country)) Oksana Kalashnikova | 1 | 4
7 | (Ukraine) Lyudmyla Kichenok | 6 | 6

==== Third qualifier ====
First round
3 | (Ukraine) Maryna Zanevska | 6 | 6
(Uzbekistan) Vlada Ekshibarova | 2 | 1
(Uzbekistan) Sabina Sharipova | 4 | 3
5 | (Ukraine) Nadiia Kichenok | 6 | 6

Qualifying competition
3 | (Ukraine) Maryna Zanevska | 6^{10} | 6 | 6
5 | (Ukraine) Nadiia Kichenok | 7^{12} | 1 | 4

==== Fourth qualifier ====
First round
4 | (Russia) Marta Sirotkina | 6^{1} | 4
(Russia) Margarita Gasparyan | 7^{7} | 6
(India) Ankita Raina | 2 | 6 | 1
8 | (Japan) Risa Ozaki | 6 | 4 | 6

Qualifying competition
(Russia) Margarita Gasparyan | 6 | 5 | 6
8 | (Japan) Risa Ozaki | 0 | 7 | 2
