= 2013 Tashkent Open – Singles =

Singles
- 2013 Tashkent Open

Final
- Champion: (Serbia) Bojana Jovanovski
- Runner-up: (Belarus) Olga Govortsova
- Score: 4–6, 7–5, 7–6^{(7–3)}

Details
- Draw: 32
- Seeds: 8

Events
| Singles | Doubles |
- Tashkent Open

Irina-Camelia Begu was the defending champion, but lost in the second round to María Teresa Torró Flor.
Bojana Jovanovski won the title, defeating Olga Govortsova in the final, 4–6, 7–5, 7–6^{(7–3)}.

== Seeds ==
1. (Serbia) Bojana Jovanovski (champion)
2. (Ukraine) Lesia Tsurenko (first round)
3. (Austria) Yvonne Meusburger (quarterfinals)
4. (Croatia) Donna Vekić (second round)
5. (Romania) Alexandra Cadanțu (quarterfinals)
6. (Romania) Irina-Camelia Begu (second round)
7. (Kazakhstan) Galina Voskoboeva (quarterfinals)
8. (Kazakhstan) Yaroslava Shvedova (first round)

== Draw ==
Key

- Q = Qualifier
- WC = Wild card
- LL = Lucky loser
- Alt = Alternate
- ITF = ITF entry
- PR = Protected ranking
- SR = Special ranking
- SE = Special exempt
- JE = Junior exempt
- JR = Junior Accelerator Programme entrant
- CO = College Accelerator Programme entrant
- NG = Next Gen Accelerator Program entrant
- w/o = Walkover
- r = Retired
- d = Defaulted

=== Finals ===
Semifinals
1/Q | (Serbia) Bojana Jovanovski | 6 | 6
(Spain) María Teresa Torró Flor | 2 | 2
(Belarus) Olga Govortsova | 6 | 7
(Luxembourg) Mandy Minella | 2 | 5

Final
1/Q | (Serbia) Bojana Jovanovski | 4 | 7 | 7^{7}
(Belarus) Olga Govortsova | 6 | 5 | 6^{3}

=== Top half ===
First round
1/Q | (Serbia) B Jovanovski | 6 | 6
(Japan) K Nara | 4 | 3
(Japan) M Doi | 6 | 6
PR | (Russia) E Rodina | 4 | 2
(Israel) J Glushko | 6 | 7
Q | (Ukraine) T Arefyeva | 3 | 5
(Ukraine) M Zanevska | 3 | 4
7 | (Kazakhstan) G Voskoboeva | 6 | 6
3 | (Austria) Y Meusburger | 2 | 6 | 6
(Hungary) T Babos | 6 | 2 | 1
WC | (Uzbekistan) N Abduraimova | 2 | 6^{2}
PR | (Czech Republic) P Cetkovská | 6 | 7^{7}
WC | (Uzbekistan) A Folts | 0 | 3
(Spain) MT Torró Flor | 6 | 6
Q | (Russia) A Panova | 6^{8} | 1
6 | (Romania) I-C Begu | 7^{10} | 6

Second round
1/Q | (Serbia) B Jovanovski | 6 | 7
(Japan) M Doi | 2 | 5
(Israel) J Glushko | 3 | 1
7 | (Kazakhstan) G Voskoboeva | 6 | 6
3 | (Austria) Y Meusburger | 7 | 6
PR | (Czech Republic) P Cetkovská | 5 | 4
(Spain) MT Torró Flor | 6 | 7
6 | (Romania) I-C Begu | 1 | 5

Quarterfinals
1/Q | (Serbia) B Jovanovski | 1 | 6 | 7^{7}
7 | (Kazakhstan) G Voskoboeva | 6 | 4 | 6^{5}
3 | (Austria) Y Meusburger | 3 | 0
(Spain) MT Torró Flor | 6 | 6

Semifinals
1/Q | (Serbia) B Jovanovski | 6 | 6
(Spain) MT Torró Flor | 2 | 2

=== Bottom half ===
First round
5 | (Romania) A Cadanțu | 6 | 6
WC | (Uzbekistan) S Sharipova | 2 | 0
(Czech Republic) E Birnerová | 5 | 2
(Ukraine) N Kichenok | 7 | 6
(Belarus) O Govortsova | 7 | 2 | 6
PR | (Netherlands) M Krajicek | 5 | 6 | 1
Q | (Ukraine) L Kichenok | 3 | 2
4 | (Croatia) D Vekić | 6 | 6
8 | (Kazakhstan) Y Shvedova | 6^{6} | 5
(Serbia) V Dolonc | 7^{8} | 7
(Luxembourg) M Minella | 6 | 6
(Russia) O Puchkova | 2 | 3
Q | (Ukraine) K Kozlova | 5 | 2
Q | (Japan) R Ozaki | 7 | 6
(Italy) N Burnett | 7^{7} | 6
2 | (Ukraine) L Tsurenko | 6^{4} | 4

Second round
5 | (Romania) A Cadanțu | 6 | 6
(Ukraine) N Kichenok | 1 | 3
(Belarus) O Govortsova | 7^{7} | 6
4 | (Croatia) D Vekić | 6^{4} | 3
(Serbia) V Dolonc | 6 | 4 | 3
(Luxembourg) M Minella | 4 | 6 | 6
Q | (Japan) R Ozaki | 4 | 6 | 6^{4}
(Italy) N Burnett | 6 | 3 | 7^{7}

Quarterfinals
5 | (Romania) A Cadanțu | 3 | 2
(Belarus) O Govortsova | 6 | 6
(Luxembourg) M Minella | 7^{7} | 7
(Italy) N Burnett | 6^{4} | 5

Semifinals
(Belarus) O Govortsova | 6 | 7
(Luxembourg) M Minella | 2 | 5

== Qualifying ==
=== Seeds ===
1. (Serbia) Bojana Jovanovski (qualified)
2. (Russia) Daria Gavrilova (first round)
3. (Russia) Alexandra Panova (qualified)
4. (Russia) Valeria Savinykh (first round)
5. (Tunisia) Ons Jabeur (qualifying competition)
6. (Russia) Marta Sirotkina (qualifying competition)
7. (Japan) Risa Ozaki (qualified)
8. (Ukraine) Lyudmyla Kichenok (qualified)
9. (Russia) Arina Rodionova (qualifying competition)
10. (Belarus) Ilona Kremen (qualifying competition)
11. (Ukraine) Kateryna Kozlova (qualified)
12. (Ukraine) Valentyna Ivakhnenko (first round)

=== Qualifiers ===
1. (Serbia) Bojana Jovanovski
2. (Ukraine) Tetyana Arefyeva
3. (Russia) Alexandra Panova
4. (Japan) Risa Ozaki
5. (Ukraine) Lyudmyla Kichenok
6. (Ukraine) Kateryna Kozlova

=== Draw ===
==== First qualifier ====
First round
1 | (Serbia) Bojana Jovanovski | 6 | 6
(Slovakia) Michaela Hončová | 1 | 4
(Czech Republic) Tereza Martincová | 1 | 2
9 | (Russia) Arina Rodionova | 6 | 6

Qualifying competition
1 | (Serbia) Bojana Jovanovski | 6 | 6
9 | (Russia) Arina Rodionova | 4 | 4

==== Second qualifier ====
First round
2 | (Russia) Daria Gavrilova | 6 | 0 | 2
(Ukraine) Tetyana Arefyeva | 1 | 6 | 6
(Belarus) Aliaksandra Sasnovich | 6 | 6
12 | (Ukraine) Valentyna Ivakhnenko | 2 | 1

Qualifying competition
(Ukraine) Tetyana Arefyeva | 1 | 6 | 6
(Belarus) Aliaksandra Sasnovich | 6 | 1 | 3

==== Third qualifier ====
First round
3 | (Russia) Alexandra Panova | 6 | 6
WC | (Uzbekistan) Amina Mukhametshina | 2 | 1
WC | (Uzbekistan) Guzal Yusupova | 1 | 4
10 | (Belarus) Ilona Kremen | 6 | 6

Qualifying competition
3 | (Russia) Alexandra Panova | 6 | 6
10 | (Belarus) Ilona Kremen | 4 | 4

==== Fourth qualifier ====
First round
4 | (Russia) Valeria Savinykh | 2 | 3
(Kyrgyzstan) Ksenia Palkina | 6 | 6
(Ukraine) Veronika Kapshay | 1 | 3
7 | (Japan) Risa Ozaki | 6 | 6

Qualifying competition
(Kyrgyzstan) Ksenia Palkina | 1 | 5
7 | (Japan) Risa Ozaki | 6 | 7

==== Fifth qualifier ====
First round
5 | (Tunisia) Ons Jabeur | 6 | 6
WC | (Uzbekistan) Polina Merenkova | 2 | 1
(Romania) Raluca Olaru | 1 | 4
8 | (Ukraine) Lyudmyla Kichenok | 6 | 6

Qualifying competition
5 | (Tunisia) Ons Jabeur | 1 | 5
8 | (Ukraine) Lyudmyla Kichenok | 6 | 7

==== Sixth qualifier ====
First round
6 | (Russia) Marta Sirotkina | 6 | 7
(Serbia) Teodora Mirčić | 4 | 5
WC | (Uzbekistan) Alina Abdurakhimova | 1 | 2
11 | (Ukraine) Kateryna Kozlova | 6 | 6

Qualifying competition
6 | (Russia) Marta Sirotkina | 6 | 1 | 2
11 | (Ukraine) Kateryna Kozlova | 2 | 6 | 6
