= 2013 Tashkent Open – Doubles =

Doubles
- 2013 Tashkent Open

Final
- Champions: (Hungary) Tímea Babos (Kazakhstan) Yaroslava Shvedova
- Runners-up: (Belarus) Olga Govortsova (Luxembourg) Mandy Minella
- Score: 6–3, 6–3

Details
- Draw: 16
- Seeds: 4

Events
Singles	Doubles
← 2012 ·	Tashkent Open	· 2014 →

Paula Kania and Polina Pekhova were the defending champions, but Kania chose not to participate. Pekhova played alongside Ksenia Palkina, but lost in the first round to Tímea Babos and Yaroslava Shvedova.
Babos and Shvedova went on to win the title, defeating Olga Govortsova and Mandy Minella in the final, 6–3, 6–3.

== Seeds ==
1. (Hungary) Tímea Babos / (Kazakhstan) Yaroslava Shvedova (champions)
2. (Belarus) Olga Govortsova / (Luxembourg) Mandy Minella (final)
3. (Czech Republic) Eva Birnerová / (Ukraine) Irina Buryachok (first round)
4. (Serbia) Vesna Dolonc / (Romania) Raluca Olaru (first round)

== Draw ==
=== Key ===
- Q = Qualifier
- WC = Wild card
- LL = Lucky loser
- Alt = Alternate
- SE = Special exempt
- PR = Protected ranking
- ITF = ITF entry
- JE = Junior exempt
- w/o = Walkover
- r = Retired
- d = Defaulted
- SR = Special ranking

=== Draw ===
First round
1	(Hungary) T Babos (Kazakhstan) Y Shvedova	6	6
(Kyrgyzstan) K Palkina (Belarus) P Pekhova	3	1
(Ukraine) V Ivakhnenko (Ukraine) K Kozlova	5	3
(Netherlands) M Krajicek (Russia) A Panova	7	6
3	(Czech Republic) E Birnerová (Ukraine) I Buryachok	4	6^{7}
(Romania) I-C Begu (Romania) A Cadanțu	6	7^{9}
(Uzbekistan) N Abduraimova (Russia) D Gavrilova	2	6	[3]
(Russia) V Savinykh (Spain) MT Torró Flor	6	4	[10]
WC	(Uzbekistan) A Folts (Uzbekistan) G Yusupova	0	2
(Ukraine) V Kapshay (Serbia) T Mirčić	6	6
(Ukraine) L Kichenok (Ukraine) N Kichenok	6	6
4	(Serbia) V Dolonc (Romania) R Olaru	3	2
(Belarus) I Kremen (Belarus) A Sasnovich	4	2
(Russia) A Rodionova (Ukraine) M Zanevska	6	6
WC	(Slovakia) M Hončová (Uzbekistan) S Sharipova	2	2
2	(Belarus) O Govortsova (Luxembourg) M Minella	6	6

Quarterfinals
1	(Hungary) T Babos (Kazakhstan) Y Shvedova	6	6
(Netherlands) M Krajicek (Russia) A Panova	1	2
(Romania) I-C Begu (Romania) A Cadanțu	6	3	[11]
(Russia) V Savinykh (Spain) MT Torró Flor	2	6	[13]
(Ukraine) V Kapshay (Serbia) T Mirčić	2	2
(Ukraine) L Kichenok (Ukraine) N Kichenok	6	6
(Russia) A Rodionova (Ukraine) M Zanevska	7^{7}	2	[9]
2	(Belarus) O Govortsova (Luxembourg) M Minella	6^{3}	6	[11]

Semifinals
1	(Hungary) T Babos (Kazakhstan) Y Shvedova	6	6
(Russia) V Savinykh (Spain) MT Torró Flor	2	2
(Ukraine) L Kichenok (Ukraine) N Kichenok	1	3
2	(Belarus) O Govortsova (Luxembourg) M Minella	6	6

Final
1	(Hungary) T Babos (Kazakhstan) Y Shvedova	6	6
2	(Belarus) O Govortsova (Luxembourg) M Minella	3	3
