= 2013 Tashkent Open =

- Date: September 7–14
- Edition: 15th
- Category: WTA International
- Draw: 32S / 16D
- Prize money: $235,000
- Surface: Hard
- Location: Tashkent, Uzbekistan

Champions

Singles
- (Serbia) Bojana Jovanovski

Doubles
- (Hungary) Tímea Babos / (Kazakhstan) Yaroslava Shvedova
← 2012 ·	Tashkent Open	· 2014 →

The 2013 Tashkent Open was a WTA International tennis tournament played on outdoor hard courts. It was the 15th edition of the Tashkent Open, on the 2013 WTA Tour. It took place at the Tashkent Tennis Center in Tashkent, Uzbekistan, from September 7 through September 14, 2013. First-seeded Bojana Jovanovski won the singles title.

== Finals ==
=== Singles ===
(Serbia) Bojana Jovanovski defeated (Belarus) Olga Govortsova, 4–6, 7–5, 7–6^{(7–3)}

- It was Jovanovski's only singles title of the year and the 2nd of her career.

=== Doubles ===
(Hungary) Tímea Babos / (Kazakhstan) Yaroslava Shvedova defeated (Belarus) Olga Govortsova / (Luxembourg) Mandy Minella, 6–3, 6–3

== Singles main-draw entrants ==
Country	Player	Rank^{1}	Seed
SRB	Bojana Jovanovski^{2}	58	1
UKR	Lesia Tsurenko	61	2
AUT	Yvonne Meusburger	64	3
CRO	Donna Vekić	65	4
ROU	Alexandra Cadanțu	73	5
ROU	Irina-Camelia Begu	74	6
KAZ	Galina Voskoboeva	77	7
KAZ	Yaroslava Shvedova	78	8

- ^{1} Rankings as of August 26, 2013
- ^{2} Jovanovski was a late entrant and only granted top seeding upon qualification

=== Other entrants ===
The following players received wildcards into the singles main draw:

- (Uzbekistan) Nigina Abduraimova
- (Uzbekistan) Arina Folts
- (Uzbekistan) Sabina Sharipova

The following players received entry from the qualifying draw:

- (Ukraine) Tetyana Arefyeva
- (Serbia) Bojana Jovanovski
- (Ukraine) Lyudmyla Kichenok
- (Ukraine) Kateryna Kozlova
- (Japan) Risa Ozaki
- (Russia) Alexandra Panova

=== Withdrawals ===
Before the tournament

- (Chinese Taipei) Hsieh Su-wei
- (Italy) Karin Knapp
- (Poland) Urszula Radwańska

== Doubles main-draw entrants ==
=== Seeds ===
Country	Player	Country	Player	Rank^{1}	Seed
HUN	Tímea Babos	KAZ	Yaroslava Shvedova	121	1
LUX	Mandy Minella	BLR	Olga Govortsova	138	2
CZE	Eva Birnerová	GEO	Irina Buryachok	157	3
SRB	Vesna Dolonc	ROU	Raluca Olaru	178	4

- ^{1} Rankings as of August 26, 2013

=== Other entrants ===
The following pairs received wildcards into the doubles main draw:

- (Uzbekistan) Arina Folts / (Uzbekistan) Guzal Yusupova
- (Slovakia) Michaela Hončová / (Uzbekistan) Sabina Sharipova
