= 2015 US Open – Women's doubles =

Women's doubles
- 2015 US Open

Final
- Champions: (Switzerland) Martina Hingis (India) Sania Mirza
- Runners-up: (Australia) Casey Dellacqua (Kazakhstan) Yaroslava Shvedova
- Score: 6–3, 6–3

Details
- Draw: 64 (7 WC )
- Seeds: 16

Events
Singles	men	women		boys	girls
Doubles	men	women	mixed	boys	girls
WC Singles	men	women	quad
WC Doubles	men	women	quad
Legends	men	women	mixed
← 2014 ·	US Open	· 2016 →

Ekaterina Makarova and Elena Vesnina were the defending champions, but Makarova decided not to participate. Vesnina played alongside Eugenie Bouchard, but they withdrew from their second round match because of a concussion sustained by Bouchard.

Martina Hingis and Sania Mirza won their second Grand Slam doubles title together, defeating Casey Dellacqua and Yaroslava Shvedova in the final, 6–3, 6–3.

== Seeds ==
1. (Switzerland) Martina Hingis / (India) Sania Mirza (champions)
2. (United States) Bethanie Mattek-Sands / (Czech Republic) Lucie Šafářová (withdrew due to Šafářová's abdominal injury)
3. (Hungary) Tímea Babos / (France) Kristina Mladenovic (third round)
4. (Australia) Casey Dellacqua / (Kazakhstan) Yaroslava Shvedova (final)
5. (France) Caroline Garcia / (Slovenia) Katarina Srebotnik (quarterfinals)
6. (United States) Raquel Kops-Jones / (United States) Abigail Spears (third round)
7. (Czech Republic) Andrea Hlaváčková / (Czech Republic) Lucie Hradecká (third round)
8. (Spain) Garbiñe Muguruza / (Spain) Carla Suárez Navarro (second round)
9. (Chinese Taipei) Chan Hao-ching / (Chinese Taipei) Chan Yung-jan (quarterfinals)
10. (Chinese Taipei) Hsieh Su-wei / (Australia) Anastasia Rodionova (second round)
11. (Italy) Sara Errani / (Italy) Flavia Pennetta (semifinals)
12. (Russia) Alla Kudryavtseva / (Russia) Anastasia Pavlyuchenkova (quarterfinals)
13. (Netherlands) Michaëlla Krajicek / (Czech Republic) Barbora Strýcová (third round)
14. (Spain) Anabel Medina Garrigues / (Spain) Arantxa Parra Santonja (second round)
15. (Spain) Lara Arruabarrena / (Slovenia) Andreja Klepač (quarterfinals)
16. (Germany) Julia Görges / (Poland) Klaudia Jans-Ignacik (first round)
17. (Italy) Karin Knapp / (Italy) Roberta Vinci (third round)

== Draw ==
=== Key ===
- Q = Qualifier
- WC = Wild card
- LL = Lucky loser
- Alt = Alternate
- ITF = ITF entry
- PR = Protected ranking
- SR = Special ranking
- SE = Special exempt
- JE = Junior exempt
- JR = Junior Accelerator Programme entrant
- CO = College Accelerator Programme entrant
- NG = Next Gen Accelerator Program entrant
- w/o = Walkover
- r = Retired
- d = Defaulted

=== Finals ===
Quarterfinals
1	(Switzerland) Martina Hingis (India) Sania Mirza	7^{7}	6
9	(Chinese Taipei) Chan Hao-ching (Chinese Taipei) Chan Yung-jan	6^{5}	1
15	(Spain) Lara Arruabarrena (Slovenia) Andreja Klepač	0	7	2
11	(Italy) Sara Errani (Italy) Flavia Pennetta	6	5	6
12	(Russia) Alla Kudryavtseva (Russia) Anastasia Pavlyuchenkova	2	6	3
4	(Australia) Casey Dellacqua (Kazakhstan) Yaroslava Shvedova	6	2	6
(Germany) Anna-Lena Grönefeld (United States) CoCo Vandeweghe	7^{7}	7
5	(France) Caroline Garcia (Slovenia) Katarina Srebotnik	6^{5}	5

Semifinals
1	(Switzerland) Martina Hingis (India) Sania Mirza	6	6
11	(Italy) Sara Errani (Italy) Flavia Pennetta	4	1
4	(Australia) Casey Dellacqua (Kazakhstan) Yaroslava Shvedova	6^{3}	7	7
(Germany) Anna-Lena Grönefeld (United States) CoCo Vandeweghe	7^{7}	5	5

Final
1	(Switzerland) Martina Hingis (India) Sania Mirza	6	6
4	(Australia) Casey Dellacqua (Kazakhstan) Yaroslava Shvedova	3	3

=== Top half ===
==== Section 1 ====
First round
1	(Switzerland) M Hingis (India) S Mirza	6	6
WC	(United States) K Christian (United States) S Santamaria	1	2
(Switzerland) T Bacsinszky (Chinese Taipei) C-j Chuang	6	7^{7}
WC	(United States) M Oudin (United States) J Pegula	4	6^{5}
(Kazakhstan) Z Diyas (China) Y Xu	6	5	6^{7}
PR	(United States) V King (China) S Zheng	2	7	7^{9}
Alt	(United Kingdom) J Rae (United Kingdom) A Smith	4	4
13	(Netherlands) M Krajicek (Czech Republic) B Strýcová	6	6
9	(Chinese Taipei) H-c Chan (Chinese Taipei) Y-j Chan	6	6
(Romania) A Dulgheru (United States) C McHale	2	4
(Germany) S Lisicki (Czech Republic) Ka Plíšková	2	6	2
(Germany) M Barthel (Germany) L Siegemund	6	3	6
PR	(Georgia (country)) O Kalashnikova (Hungary) K Marosi	6	3	2
(Romania) I-C Begu (Romania) R Olaru	2	6	6
(Japan) K Date-Krumm (Luxembourg) M Minella	1	5
8	(Spain) G Muguruza (Spain) C Suárez Navarro	6	7

Second round
1	(Switzerland) M Hingis (India) S Mirza	6	6
(Switzerland) T Bacsinszky (Chinese Taipei) C-j Chuang	1	1
PR	(United States) V King (China) S Zheng	3	4
13	(Netherlands) M Krajicek (Czech Republic) B Strýcová	6	6
9	(Chinese Taipei) H-c Chan (Chinese Taipei) Y-j Chan	6	6
(Germany) M Barthel (Germany) L Siegemund	2	4
(Romania) I-C Begu (Romania) R Olaru	7	6
8	(Spain) G Muguruza (Spain) C Suárez Navarro	5	4

Third round
1	(Switzerland) M Hingis (India) S Mirza	6	6
13	(Netherlands) M Krajicek (Czech Republic) B Strýcová	3	0
9	(Chinese Taipei) H-c Chan (Chinese Taipei) Y-j Chan	5	6	7^{7}
(Romania) I-C Begu (Romania) R Olaru	7	1	6^{4}

Quarterfinals
1	(Switzerland) M Hingis (India) S Mirza	7^{7}	6
9	(Chinese Taipei) H-c Chan (Chinese Taipei) Y-j Chan	6^{5}	1

==== Section 2 ====
First round
3	(Hungary) T Babos (France) K Mladenovic	6	7^{7}
(Romania) A Mitu (Brazil) T Pereira	1	6^{2}
(Czech Republic) K Koukalová (China) C Liang	1	5
(Slovakia) D Cibulková (Slovakia) M Rybáriková	6	7
(Spain) S Soler Espinosa (Spain) MT Torró Flor	5	2
WC	(United States) N Gibbs (United States) T Townsend	7	6
(France) A Cornet (Poland) M Linette	6	0	6^{5}
15	(Spain) L Arruabarrena (Slovenia) A Klepač	4	6	7^{7}
11	(Italy) S Errani (Italy) F Pennetta	3	6	6
WC	(United States) I Falconi (United States) A Tatishvili	6	0	2
(Australia) J Gajdošová (Australia) A Tomljanović	6^{5}	6	2
WC	(United States) A Muhammad (United States) M Sanchez	7^{7}	3	6
(United States) M Brengle (Germany) T Maria	5	2
(Canada) E Bouchard (Russia) E Vesnina	7	6
WC	(United States) M Jansen (Canada) E Routliffe	2	1
6	(United States) R Kops-Jones (United States) A Spears	6	6

Second round
3	(Hungary) T Babos (France) K Mladenovic	6	6
(Slovakia) D Cibulková (Slovakia) M Rybáriková	4	4
WC	(United States) N Gibbs (United States) T Townsend	6	3	5
15	(Spain) L Arruabarrena (Slovenia) A Klepač	3	6	7
11	(Italy) S Errani (Italy) F Pennetta	7^{7}	6
WC	(United States) A Muhammad (United States) M Sanchez	6^{5}	1
(Canada) E Bouchard (Russia) E Vesnina
6	(United States) R Kops-Jones (United States) A Spears	w/o

Third round
3	(Hungary) T Babos (France) K Mladenovic	4	6	4
15	(Spain) L Arruabarrena (Slovenia) A Klepač	6	4	6
11	(Italy) S Errani (Italy) F Pennetta	5	6	6
6	(United States) R Kops-Jones (United States) A Spears	7	2	2

Quarterfinals
15	(Spain) L Arruabarrena (Slovenia) A Klepač	0	7	2
11	(Italy) S Errani (Italy) F Pennetta	6	5	6

=== Bottom half ===
==== Section 3 ====
First round
17	(Italy) K Knapp (Italy) R Vinci	6	6
Alt	(Czech Republic) D Allertová (Croatia) A Konjuh	1	0
(Switzerland) B Bencic (Czech Republic) K Siniaková	4	4
(Russia) M Gasparyan (Russia) A Panova	6	6
(Romania) M Niculescu (Ukraine) O Savchuk	6	6
(Japan) S Aoyama (Czech Republic) R Voráčová	2	1
(Slovenia) P Hercog (Croatia) M Lučić-Baroni	4	2
12	(Russia) A Kudryavtseva (Russia) A Pavlyuchenkova	6	6
14	(Spain) A Medina Garrigues (Spain) A Parra Santonja	7	6
(Slovakia) J Husárová (Slovakia) AK Schmiedlová	5	3
(Germany) A Beck (Netherlands) D Schuurs	5	1
(Serbia) J Janković (Serbia) A Krunić	7	6
(Belarus) O Govortsova (Ukraine) L Tsurenko	6^{4}	6	7
(Ukraine) K Bondarenko (Australia) Ar Rodionova	7^{7}	3	5
(Australia) D Gavrilova (Belgium) A Van Uytvanck	6	4	0
4	(Australia) C Dellacqua (Kazakhstan) Y Shvedova	2	6	6

Second round
17	(Italy) K Knapp (Italy) R Vinci	7	5	6
(Russia) M Gasparyan (Russia) A Panova	5	7	3
(Romania) M Niculescu (Ukraine) O Savchuk	6^{7}	3
12	(Russia) A Kudryavtseva (Russia) A Pavlyuchenkova	7^{9}	6
14	(Spain) A Medina Garrigues (Spain) A Parra Santonja	2	2
(Serbia) J Janković (Serbia) A Krunić	6	6
(Belarus) O Govortsova (Ukraine) L Tsurenko	4	0
4	(Australia) C Dellacqua (Kazakhstan) Y Shvedova	6	6

Third round
17	(Italy) K Knapp (Italy) R Vinci	6^{2}	6	2
12	(Russia) A Kudryavtseva (Russia) A Pavlyuchenkova	7^{7}	2	6
(Serbia) J Janković (Serbia) A Krunić	6	5	5
4	(Australia) C Dellacqua (Kazakhstan) Y Shvedova	2	7	7

Quarterfinals
12	(Russia) A Kudryavtseva (Russia) A Pavlyuchenkova	2	6	3
4	(Australia) C Dellacqua (Kazakhstan) Y Shvedova	6	2	6

==== Section 4 ====
First round
7	(Czech Republic) A Hlaváčková (Czech Republic) L Hradecká	6	6
(United States) V Lepchenko (United States) A Riske	2	2
WC	(United States) TA Black (United States) I Neel	3	6	6
Alt	(Montenegro) D Kovinić (Kazakhstan) Y Putintseva	6	2	2
(Germany) A-L Grönefeld (United States) C Vandeweghe	6	6
(Russia) S Kuznetsova (Australia) S Stosur	3	4
Alt	(Czech Republic) E Hrdinová (Serbia) B Jovanovski	2	3
10	(Chinese Taipei) S-w Hsieh (Australia) An Rodionova	6	6
16	(Germany) J Görges (Poland) K Jans-Ignacik	7^{7}	6^{2}	5
(Netherlands) K Bertens (Sweden) J Larsson	6^{5}	7^{7}	7
(Ukraine) L Kichenok (Ukraine) N Kichenok	2	6	6
(Canada) G Dabrowski (Poland) A Rosolska	6	4	3
(United States) M Keys (United States) L Raymond	2	4
PR	(Belgium) K Flipkens (United Kingdom) L Robson	6	6
(Chinese Taipei) C-w Chan (Croatia) D Jurak	3	2
5	(France) C Garcia (Slovenia) K Srebotnik	6	6

Second round
7	(Czech Republic) A Hlaváčková (Czech Republic) L Hradecká	6	4	6
WC	(United States) TA Black (United States) I Neel	3	6	1
(Germany) A-L Grönefeld (United States) C Vandeweghe	7	6
10	(Chinese Taipei) S-w Hsieh (Australia) An Rodionova	5	4
(Netherlands) K Bertens (Sweden) J Larsson	7^{7}	6
(Ukraine) L Kichenok (Ukraine) N Kichenok	6^{4}	4
PR	(Belgium) K Flipkens (United Kingdom) L Robson	2	3
5	(France) C Garcia (Slovenia) K Srebotnik	6	6

Third round
7	(Czech Republic) A Hlaváčková (Czech Republic) L Hradecká	2	4
(Germany) A-L Grönefeld (United States) C Vandeweghe	6	6
(Netherlands) K Bertens (Sweden) J Larsson	7^{7}	6^{4}	6^{2}
5	(France) C Garcia (Slovenia) K Srebotnik	6^{4}	7^{7}	7^{7}

Quarterfinals
(Germany) A-L Grönefeld (United States) C Vandeweghe	7^{7}	7
5	(France) C Garcia (Slovenia) K Srebotnik	6^{5}	5
