= 2013 Fed Cup Asia/Oceania Zone Group I – Pool B =

Group B of the 2013 Fed Cup Asia/Oceania Zone Group I was one of four pools in the Asia/Oceania zone of the 2013 Fed Cup. Three teams competed in a round robin competition, with the top team and the bottom team proceeding to their respective sections of the play-offs: the top team played for advancement to the World Group II Play-offs, while the bottom team faced potential relegation to Group II.

== Standings ==
		(China) CHN	(Chinese Taipei) TPE	(South Korea) KOR	(Uzbekistan) UZB	RR; W–L	Match; W–L	Set; W–L	Game; W–L	Standings
27	China		3–0'	2–1	1–2	2–1	6–3	13–7	106–86	2
33	Chinese Taipei	0–3		3–0	1–2	1–2	4–5	11–13	88–109	3
37	South Korea	1–2	0–3		1–2	0–3	2–7	7–15	85–116	4
41	Uzbekistan	2–1	2–1	2–1		3–0	6–3	13–9	107–95	1

== Round robin ==
=== China vs. South Korea ===
China
2
National Tennis Centre, Astana, Kazakhstan
February 6, 2013
RuKortHard Tournament F Hard (indoors)

South Korea
1

			1	2	3
1	(China) (South Korea)	Wang Qiang; Lee Ye-ra	6; 3	6; 3
2	(China) (South Korea)	Zhou Yimiao; Han Sung-hee	6; 3	6; 2
3	(China) (South Korea)	Tang Haochen / Wang Qiang; Kang Seo-kyung / Yoo Mi	5; 7	6; 4	5; 7

=== Chinese Taipei vs. Uzbekistan ===
Chinese Taipei
1
National Tennis Centre, Astana, Kazakhstan
February 6, 2013
RuKortHard Tournament F Hard (indoors)

Uzbekistan
2

			1	2	3
1	(Chinese Taipei) (Uzbekistan)	Chan Chin-wei; Nigina Abduraimova	2; 6	6; 2	4; 6
2	(Chinese Taipei) (Uzbekistan)	Chang Kai-chen; Akgul Amanmuradova	2; 6	6; 4	4; 6
3	(Chinese Taipei) (Uzbekistan)	Chan Chin-wei / Lee Hua-chen; Nigina Abduraimova / Sabina Sharipova	7; 5	3; 6	6; 1

=== China vs. Uzbekistan ===
China
1
National Tennis Centre, Astana, Kazakhstan
February 7, 2013
RuKortHard Tournament F Hard (indoors)

Uzbekistan
2

			1	2	3
1	(China) (Uzbekistan)	Wang Qiang; Nigina Abduraimova	3; 6	2; 6
2	(China) (Uzbekistan)	Tang Haochen; Akgul Amanmuradova	1; 6	5; 7
3	(China) (Uzbekistan)	Tang Haochen / Wang Qiang; Arina Folts / Sabina Sharipova	6; 1	6; 3

=== Chinese Taipei vs. South Korea ===
Chinese Taipei
3
National Tennis Centre, Astana, Kazakhstan
February 7, 2013
RuKortHard Tournament F Hard (indoors)

South Korea
0

			1	2	3
1	(Chinese Taipei) (South Korea)	Chan Chin-wei; Lee Ye-ra	4; 6	6; 1	6; 2
2	(Chinese Taipei) (South Korea)	Chang Kai-chen; Han Sung-hee	6; 0	4; 6	6; 3
3	(Chinese Taipei) (South Korea)	Chan Chin-wei / Lee Hua-chen; Kang Seo-kyung / Yoo Mi	6; 2	6; 4

=== China vs. Chinese Taipei ===
China
3
National Tennis Centre, Astana, Kazakhstan
February 8, 2013
RuKortHard Tournament F Hard (indoors)

Chinese Taipei
0

			1	2	3
1	(China) (Chinese Taipei)	Tang Haochen; Chan Chin-wei	6^{5} 7^{7}	6; 4	6; 1
2	(China) (Chinese Taipei)	Wang Qiang; Chang Kai-chen	7^{7} 6^{4}	6; 3
3	(China) (Chinese Taipei)	Tang Haochen / Zhou Yimiao; Chan Chin-wei / Chang Kai-chen	6; 3	6; 4

=== Uzbekistan vs. South Korea ===
Uzbekistan
2
National Tennis Centre, Astana, Kazakhstan
February 8, 2013
RuKortHard Tournament F Hard (indoors)

South Korea
1

			1	2	3
1	(Uzbekistan) (South Korea)	Arina Folts; Lee Ye-ra	3; 6	6^{2} 7^{7}
2	(Uzbekistan) (South Korea)	Sabina Sharipova; Han Sung-hee	7^{7} 6^{5}	6; 3
3	(Uzbekistan) (South Korea)	Nigina Abduraimova / Akgul Amanmuradova; Kang Seo-kyung / Yoo Mi	2; 6	6; 1	6; 3
