= Bojana Jovanovski Petrović =

Serbian tennis player (born 1991)

Bojana Jovanovski Petrović Бојана Јовановски Петровић
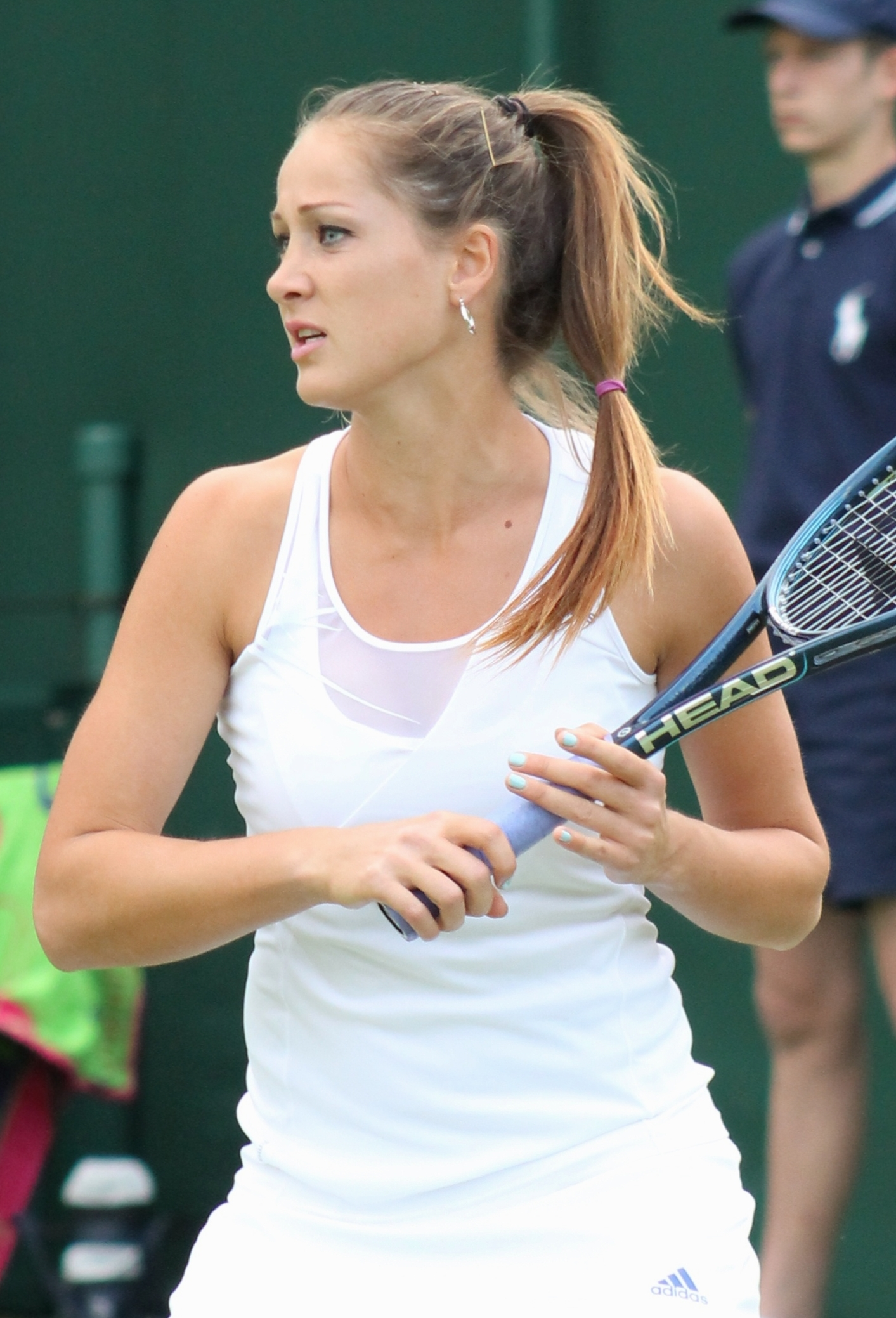
- Jovanovski at the 2013 Wimbledon Championships
- Country (sports): Serbia
- Residence: Belgrade, Serbia
- Born: 31 December 1991 (age 34) Belgrade, SFR Yugoslavia
- Height: 1.75 m (5 ft 9 in)
- Turned pro: 2007
- Retired: 2021 (last match in 2018)
- Plays: Right–handed (two–handed backhand)
- Prize money: US$ 2,195,549

Singles
- Career record: 268–211
- Career titles: 2 WTA, 1 WTA 125
- Highest ranking: No. 32 (4 August 2014)

Grand Slam singles results
- Australian Open: 4R (2013)
- French Open: 3R (2013)
- Wimbledon: 3R (2014)
- US Open: 2R (2012, 2013, 2015)

Doubles
- Career record: 18–53
- Career titles: 4 ITF
- Highest ranking: No. 203 (3 November 2014)

Grand Slam doubles results
- Australian Open: 2R (2013)
- French Open: 1R (2011, 2013, 2014, 2015)
- Wimbledon: 2R (2014)
- US Open: 1R (2010, 2011, 2012, 2013, 2014, 2015)

Grand Slam mixed doubles results
- Wimbledon: 2R (2014)

Team competitions
- Fed Cup: F (2012), record 6–11

Bojana Jovanovski Petrović (née Jovanovski; Serbian Cyrillic: Бојана Јовановски Петровић, pronounced [bǒjana joʋanǒʋskiː pětroʋitɕ]; born 31 December 1991) is a Serbian former tennis player.

In her career, Jovanovski won two singles titles on the WTA Tour and one WTA 125 singles title. On 4 August 2014, she reached her best singles ranking of world No. 32. On 3 November 2014, she peaked at No. 203 in the WTA doubles rankings.

Playing for Serbia Fed Cup team, she has a win–loss record of 6–11.

== Early life and junior years ==
Jovanovski began playing tennis aged seven at the Red Star Tennis Club. Aged 12, she won the Serbian national U–14 championships and was the finalist of the U–16. She turned professional in 2006 and played her first junior event at the tournament in Pančevo, Serbia, losing in straight sets to Ana Veselinović. That year, she also lost to Simona Halep in the finals of the Heiveld Indoor Junior Championships. In 2007, Jovanovski won junior events in Città di Santa Croce, defeating Michelle Larcher de Brito, and reached the finals in Prato and Milano, losing to Romana Tabaková and Anastasia Pivovarova, respectively.

Jovanovski would play at numerous junior Grand Slam tournaments. Her best result came at Wimbledon, where she was defeated by Madison Brengle in the quarterfinals. In 2008, Jovanovski decided to pursue her professional career on the ITF Circuit, but would also play at the junior major events. She would reach the quarterfinals at the Australian Open and Wimbledon, losing to Arantxa Rus and Laura Robson, respectively. Both Rus and Robson later won the tournaments. Jovanovski's highest junior ranking was world No. 5, which she achieved on 7 April 2008.

== Career ==
=== 2006–2009: Professional debut ===
Jovanovski made her professional debut on the ITF Circuit in 2006 in Prokuplje, Serbia where she lost to Karolina Jovanović in the second round. Two years later, she won her first ITF title at that same tournament, beating Karin Morgošová in the final. In 2008 Jovanovski reached an additional three finals, winning two of them.

She continued playing on the ITF Circuit, reaching the semifinals of three events – Belek, Sarajevo and Toruń – being defeated by Tetyana Arefyeva, Ana Jovanović, and Oksana Kalashnikova, respectively. Jovanovski played qualifications for the 2009 US Open but lost, however, to American Carly Gullickson. On 20 November 2009, Jovanovski reached the final of an ITF event in Pune, India but lost to Fujiwara. On 29 November 2009, she reached the final of an ITF event in Toyota, Aichi but lost to the former world No. 4 Kimiko Date-Krumm.

=== 2010: WTA Tour debut ===
At her first ITF tournament in 2010, in Quanzhou, Jovanovski reached the semifinals, losing in three sets to fellow Serb Aleksandra Krunić. She then played in the qualification tournament for the Australian Open, but lost to Kathrin Wörle, despite having a match point in the third set. Jovanovski was, once again, part of the Serbian Fed Cup team along with Jelena Janković, Ana Ivanovic and Ana Jovanović in the 2–3 loss against Russia in the World Group. She was then awarded with a wildcard for the main draw of Malaysian Open. On her WTA Tour debut, she beat Vitalia Diatchenko in straight sets. However, Jovanovski then lost to the first seed Elena Dementieva in round two.

On 24 April, Jovanovski made her debut for the Serbia Fed Cup team, in the World Group Playoffs against Slovakia. She lost her first singles match to Daniela Hantuchová, but then won her second rubber against Magdaléna Rybáriková. Jovanovski and Janković lost their doubles match to Hantuchová and Rybáriková for the final 3–2 scoreline for Slovakia. At the Rabat Grand Prix, her second career WTA Tour event, she defeated Barbora Záhlavová-Strýcová in the first round, but then lost to the fifth seed Angelique Kerber in the second. Jovanovski qualified for her third WTA Tour tournament at the Internazionali d'Italia, beating Nuria Llagostera Vives and former world No. 8, Alicia Molik, but then lost to Yaroslava Shvedova in the first round. In May, Jovanovski took part in the Warsaw Open, beating former world No. 5, Anna Chakvetadze, to reach the main draw where she subsequently lost to Sara Errani.

Her next tournament was the French Open, where she defeated María Irigoyen in the first round of the qualifying stage, but then fell to Anastasia Pivovarova in the second. She then suffered losses in the semifinal of the ITF event in Maribor and the Eastbourne International qualifications, but managed to enter into the main draw at Wimbledon. Jovanovski defeated Casey Dellacqua in the first round, but lost to eighth seed Victoria Azarenka in the second. Her result at Wimbledon helped her ranking rise to world No. 93. Jovanovski then played at the Slovenia Open but lost to compatriot and world No. 2, Jelena Janković, in the opening round. At the İstanbul Cup, she won three matches in straight sets to qualify for the main draw, but lost to Elena Vesnina in the first round. In August, Jovanovski qualified for the main draw of the first Premier 5 of the US Open Series, the Cincinnati Open. She upset the 14th seed Aravane Rezaï in the first round, but lost to Akgul Amanmuradova in the following round in straight sets. Jovanovski then attempted to qualify for the Rogers Cup and the Connecticut Open, but fell to Sorana Cîrstea and Elena Vesnina, respectively. Jovanovski played her second major event at the US Open, but was defeated by Anastasia Rodionova in the first round. She also competed in women's doubles partnering with Janković, but they were defeated by Kimiko Date-Krumm and Ayumi Morita.

Jovanovski then played at the Guangzhou International Open, but lost to Alla Kudryavtseva in the first round. She also lost in the first round of the Korea Open to Kirsten Flipkens, after easily winning three qualification matches. Jovanovski was then defeated in the first round of the Pan Pacific Open qualifying by Pauline Parmentier. However, she managed to turn around the early losses by qualifying for the main draw of China Open, her first ever Premier Mandatory tournament. In the opening round, she defeated a fellow qualifier, the 2009 US Open quarterfinalist Kateryna Bondarenko. She then upset good friend Janković in the second round, marking her first victory over a former world No. 1 and a top-ten player. However, she was beaten by Shahar Pe'er in the third round. Jovanovski then participated at the ITF events in Torhout, Poitiers and Taipei, defeating players such as Sania Mirza, Rika Fujiwara and Noppawan Lertcheewakarn, but without much further success. She finished the year as the youngest player in the top-100 of the WTA rankings.

In December, Jovanovski played at the ITF tournament in Dubai. She defeated Julia Babilon in the first round, Petra Martić in the second, and world No. 45, Anastasija Sevastova, in the quarterfinals, then-former world No. 16, Anabel Medina Garrigues, in her semifinal, before losing to Sania Mirza in the final. A week later, in Pune, Jovanovski won her fourth ITF title, and her first since 2008, defeating Nina Bratchikova.

=== 2011: Breakthrough year ===
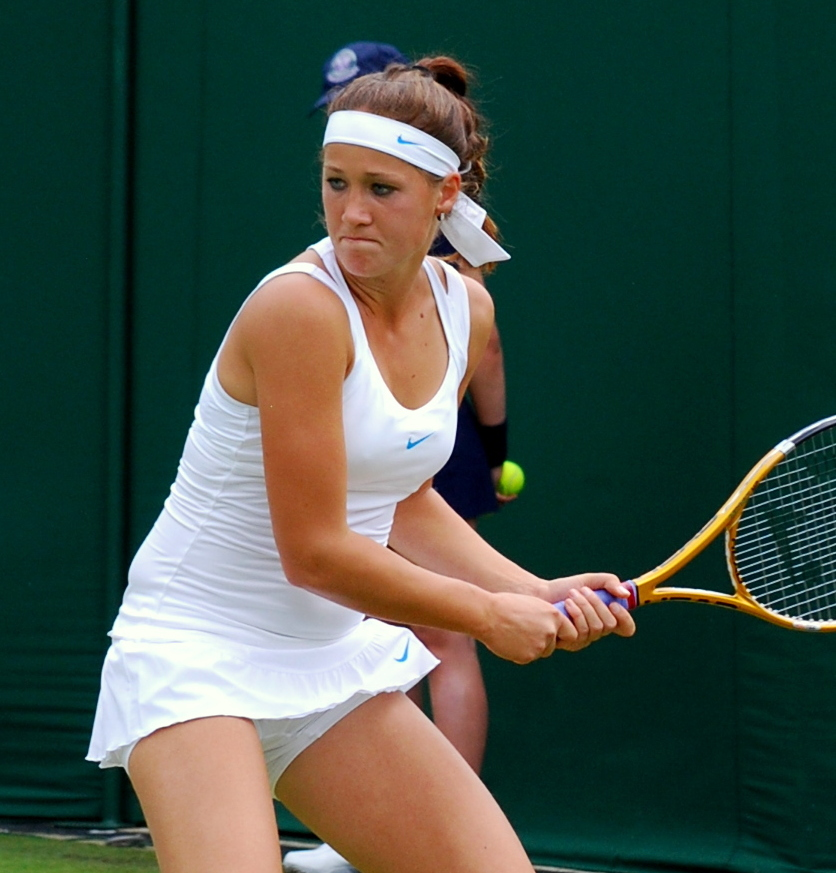
Jovanovski at the 2011 Wimbledon Championships

Jovanovski opened the season in Brisbane, defeating Anastasia Rodionova in the first round. She then lost to Anastasia Pavlyuchenkova in the second. The week after, Jovanovski qualified for the Sydney International. She defeated Kaia Kanepi, Aravane Rezaï and Flavia Pennetta, but lost her first tour semifinal to eventual champion Li Na. At the Australian Open, Jovanovski defeated Chang Kai-chen in the first round but lost to the second seed Vera Zvonareva in round two. She also played doubles partnering with Varvara Lepchenko; they lost to Kimiko Date-Krumm and Zhang Shuai. Jovanovski was the highest ranked player in the Serbia Fed Cup team for the World Group II rubber against Canada. She played alongside Ana Jovanović, Aleksandra Krunić and Tamara Čurović against Rebecca Marino, Aleksandra Wozniak, Marie-Ève Pelletier and Sharon Fichman in Novi Sad. She won both of her singles matches against Wozniak and Marino. In the doubles match, Jovanovski and Krunić defeated Fichman and Pelletier to guarantee Serbia a spot in the World Group Playoffs.

Jovanovski lost the first round of the Dubai Championships to world No. 26, Yanina Wickmayer. She qualified for the Qatar Ladies Open, but lost to Sania Mirza in the first round. Jovanovski was the eighth seed at the Malaysian Open where she defeated Tamarine Tanasugarn and Urszula Radwańska, before losing to former world No. 4 and eventual champion, Jelena Dokic, in the quarterfinals. She then suffered two consecutive first–round losses, at the Indian Wells Open to Urszula Radwańska, and at the Miami Open to Monica Niculescu. On 25 March 2011, Jovanovski was awarded with the Heart Award, given by the Fed Cup for her performances in her national colours. She then played for Serbia in a World Group Play–off rubber against Slovakia. Though she lost her singles match to Dominika Cibulková in three sets, Serbia managed to qualify for the 2012 World Group.

At the Madrid Open, Jovanovski defeated Gréta Arn in the first round, but then lost to world No. 1, Caroline Wozniacki, in the second. She then lost to the tenth seed Shahar Pe'er in the first round of the Italian Open. Jovanovski defeated Alla Kudryavtseva in the first round of the Internationaux de Strasbourg but was defeated by Medina Garrigues in round two. Jovanovski lost to 15th seed Andrea Petkovic in the first round of the French Open. Partnering with Varvara Lepchenko, she lost to Lourdes Domínguez Lino and Laura Pous Tió in the first round of the women's doubles.

Jovanovski played her first grass-court event of the year at the Birmingham Classic. Seeded tenth, she was defeated by qualifier Sarah Gronert in the first round. Jovanovski then qualified for the Eastbourne International, and defeated Anastasia Pavlyuchenkova in the first round. She lost to the seventh seed Samantha Stosur in the second. At Wimbledon, Jovanovski was eliminated by Simona Halep in the first round. Partnering with Jelena Dokic, she lost to Liezel Huber and Lisa Raymond in the first round of the doubles draw.

Jovanovski was seeded fifth at the Washington Open and defeated qualifier Petra Rampre in the first round and Jill Craybas in the second, before losing to former world No. 3 and eventual champion, Nadia Petrova, in the quarterfinals. At the Southern California Open, she was defeated by the ninth seed Roberta Vinci in the first round. Jovanovski would then beat Melanie Oudin and Arantxa Parra Santonja to qualify for the Rogers Cup. She was leading 2–0 when Dokic retired from their match in the first round. Jovanovski was then beaten by former world No. 1, Maria Sharapova, in the second round. After defeating Anna Tatishvili and Akgul Amanmuradova to qualify for the event, Jovanovski was beaten by the 17th seed Yanina Wickmayer in the first round of the Western & Southern Open. She then lost to Gisela Dulko in the first round of the Texas Tennis Open. At the US Open, Jovanovski lost in the first round to the 28th seed and former world No. 1, Serena Williams. She and Varvara Lepchenko were beaten by eighth seeds Andrea Hlaváčková and Lucie Hradecká in the first round of women's doubles.

Jovanovski then lost her first-round matches in four consecutive tournaments, the Tashkent Open, the Guangzhou International, the Pan Pacific Open and the China Open. Jovanovski won her first match after the streak of seven first–round losses at the Kremlin Cup, beating Alona Bondarenko. She would then lose in the second round to Vera Zvonareva.

=== 2012: First WTA Tour title ===
Jovanovski began her 2012 season at the Brisbane International where she defeated Casey Dellacqua, a wildcard entrant, but then lost to the fourth seed Serena Williams. She then played the qualification tournament for the Sydney International defeating Tamira Paszek and Virginie Razzano, before losing to Stefanie Vögele. At the Australian Open, Jovanovski lost in the first round to Casey Dellacqua. In doubles, she and Michaëlla Krajicek were defeated by Alla Kudryavtseva and Ekaterina Makarova in the first round. Jovanovski then played for the Serbia Fed Cup team in the World Group first round against Belgium, scoring one loss in singles, but a win in both singles and doubles to help Serbia advance to the semifinals.

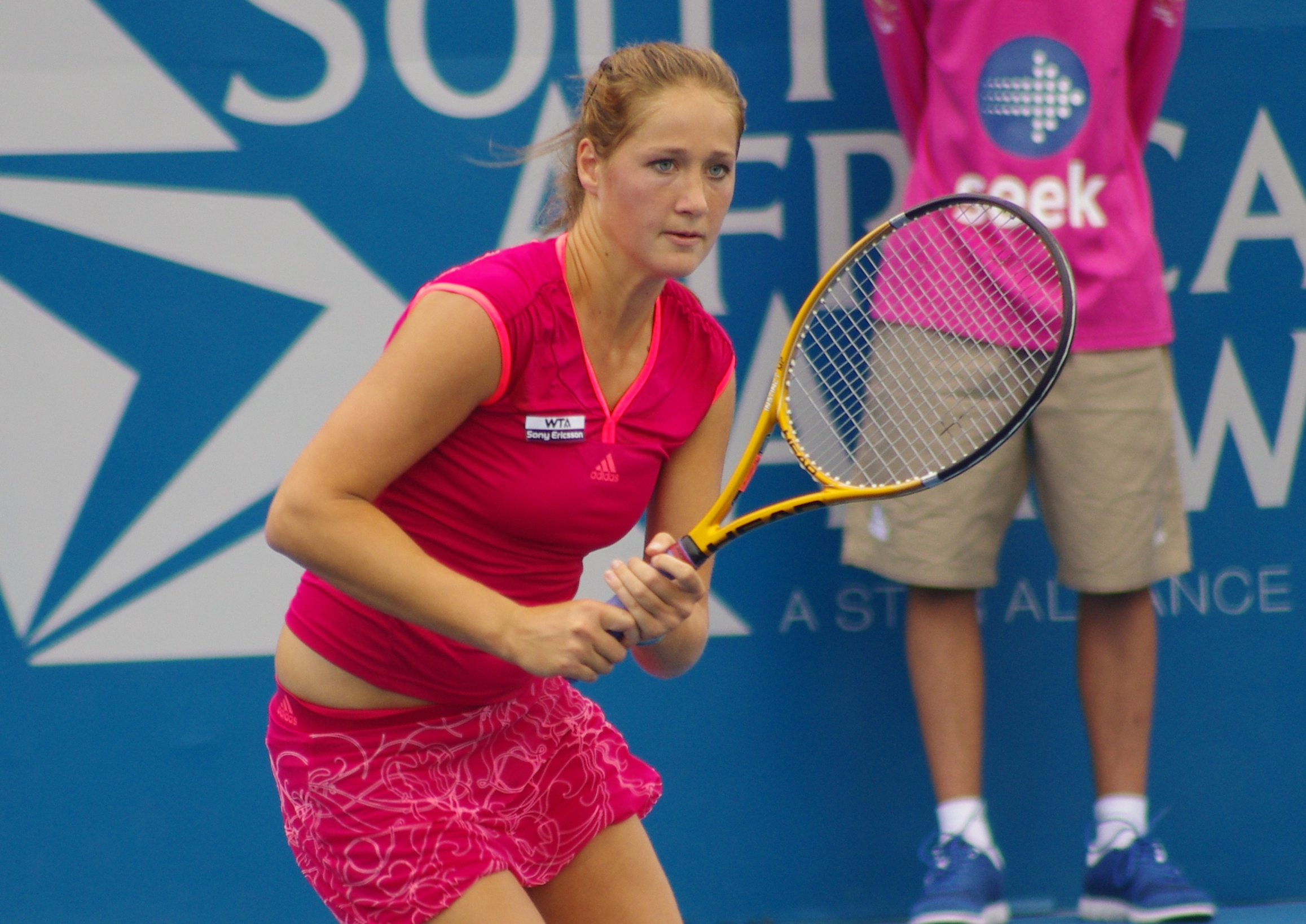
Jovanovski won her first WTA title at 2012 Baku Cup

At the Qatar Ladies Open, Jovanovski defeated Raquel Kops-Jones in the first round of qualifying, eventually losing to Aleksandra Wozniak in the second. She then lost in the second qualifying round at the Dubai Championships to Mona Barthel, having previously beaten Kurumi Nara in straight sets. Jovanovski went on to suffer two consecutive first–round losses at the Malaysian Open and the Indian Wells Open. She then played at the ITF event in the Bahamas, where she lost in the semifinals to Aleksandra Wozniak. Jovanovski received a wildcard for the Miami Open, and was defeated by Lourdes Domínguez Lino in the first round.

Jovanovski then played at the Copenhagen Open where she defeated Stefanie Vögele and upset the fourth seed Monica Niculescu, before losing in the quarterfinals to Petra Martić. Jovanovski then played in the Fed Cup semifinals against Russia. Although she and Aleksandra Krunić lost their doubles match to Maria Kirilenko and Elena Vesnina, Serbia progressed through to the final with a 3–2 win. After that, Jovanovski tried to qualify for the Budapest Grand Prix and the Madrid Open, but suffered first–round losses to Romana Tabaková and Marta Domachowska, respectively. She then qualified for the Brussels Open, where she lost in the second round to the eighth seed Kaia Kanepi. At the French Open, Jovanovski lost to world No. 3, Agnieszka Radwańska.

Jovanovski played her first grass–court tournament of the year at the Birmingham Classic where she suffered a first–round loss to Michelle Larcher de Brito, a qualifier. She then tried to qualify for the Eastbourne International, but lost to Laura Robson in the final qualification round. At Wimbledon, Jovanovski led in her first–round match against Eleni Daniilidou, when the Greek retired. She then lost to 15th seed Sabine Lisicki in three sets. Jovanovski entered the Baku Cup seeded fifth and defeated Lesia Tsurenko in the first round, Valeria Solovyeva in the second, fellow Serb Aleksandra Krunić in the quarterfinals, and the second seed Alexandra Panova in the semifinals to advance in her first career final. She defeated another first–time finalist, Julia Cohen, to win her first WTA Tour title.

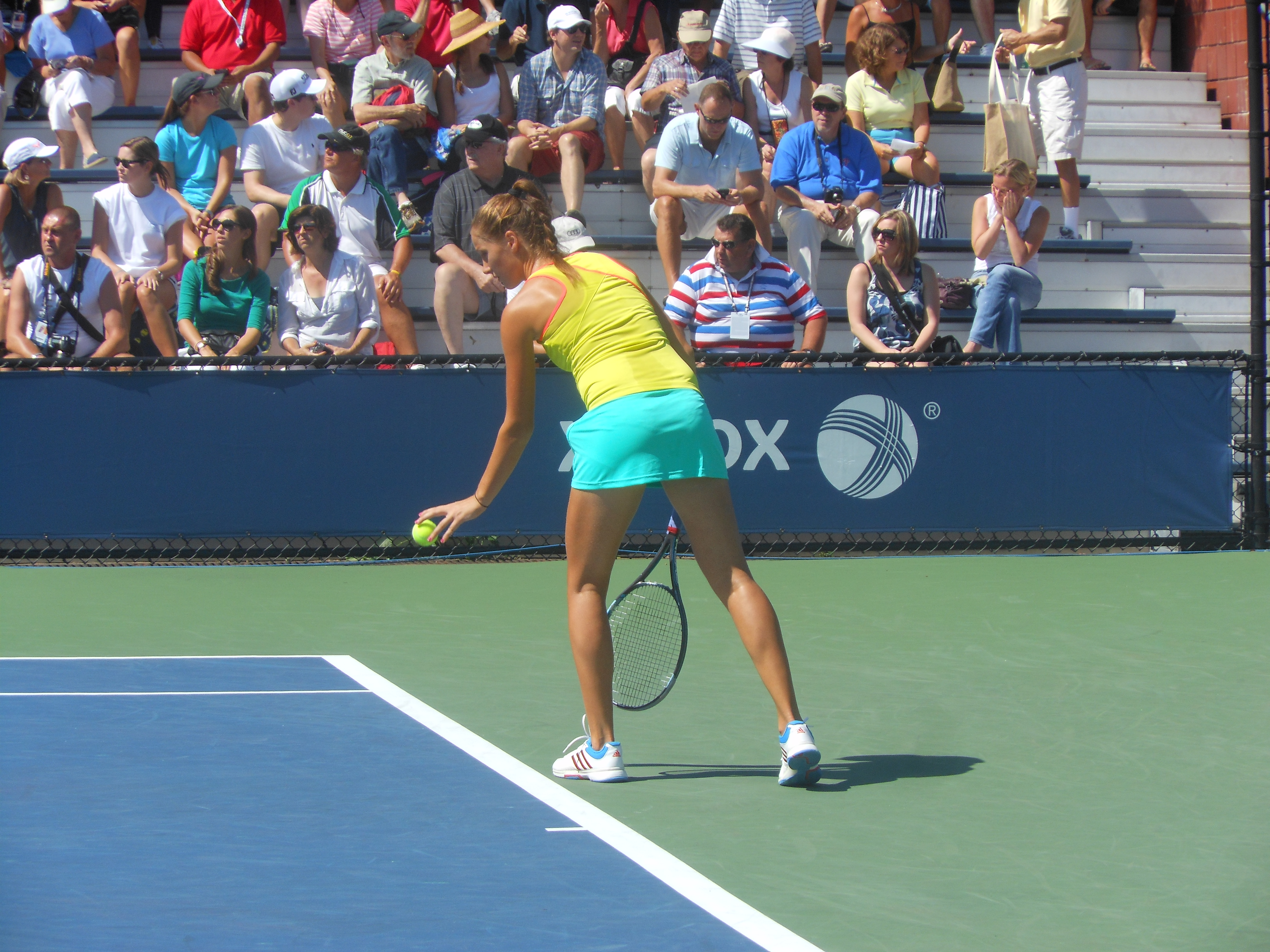
Jovanovski at the 2012 US Open

Following the capture of her first title, Jovanovski went on to lose in the first rounds of the following three tournaments – the Washington Open, the Rogers Cup and the Western & Southern Open. At the Texas Open, she defeated Alexandra Panova, and Mirjana Lučić, and led against Peng Shuai, when Peng retired, to reach the semifinal where she lost to the eventual champion, Roberta Vinci. At the US Open, she beat Mona Barthel in the first round, but went on to lose to Dominika Cibulková in the second round. Jovanovski then reached the quarterfinals of the Tashkent Open by defeating Dinah Pfizenmaier and Eleni Daniilidou, before falling to Donna Vekić. At her last four WTA tournaments of the season, Jovanovski reached the second round of the Guangzhou International Open, being defeated by Chanelle Scheepers; the third round of the Pan Pacific Open, losing to Caroline Wozniacki; the third round of the China Open, losing to Marion Bartoli; and the first round of the Kremlin Cup, being defeated by Sofia Arvidsson.

Jovanovski was a member of the Serbia Fed Cup team during the 2012 World Group Final, but did not play any matches. She and Aleksandra Krunić were scheduled to play doubles against Hlaváčková and Hradecká, but the dead rubber was cancelled as the Czech Republic had already won 3–1. As a result of their success in the 2012 Fed Cup, the team was honoured with the Award of Olympic Committee of Serbia as Women's Team of the Year.

=== 2013: Australian Open fourth round ===
Jovanovski played her first event of the season at the Shenzhen Open, where she was seeded eighth. She defeated Alexandra Cadanțu in the first round and Duan Yingying in the second, but lost in the quarterfinals to Li Na, who went on to win the tournament. Jovanovski then played in Hobart where she defeated María Teresa Torró Flor, before losing to Kirsten Flipkens in the second round. At the Australian Open, Jovanovski again defeated Torró Flor, the 17th seed Lucie Šafářová, and Kimiko Date-Krumm, before losing to eventual semifinalist Sloane Stephens in the fourth round. This had been her best career Grand Slam performance. In doubles, Jovanovski partnered with Melinda Czink to triumph over Simona Halep and Arantxa Rus in the first round, but then fell to Natalie Grandin and Vladimíra Uhlířová.

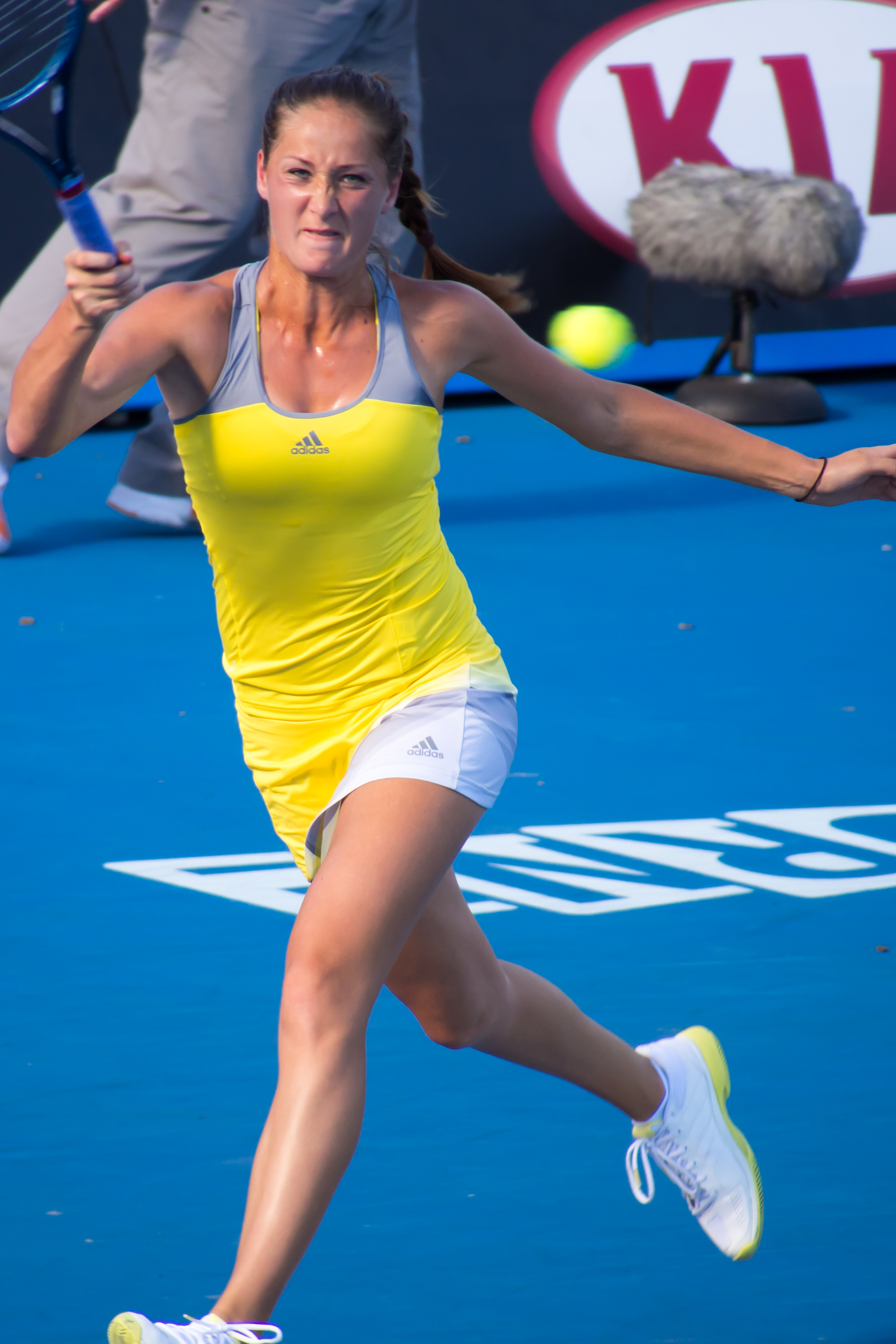
Jovanovski reached 4th round of the 2013 Australian Open, her best Grand Slam result

She then lost seven matches in a row. Four of them were at Fed Cup. First, Serbia played in World Group against Slovakia and lost 2–3. Jovanovski lost her two singles matches, first to Daniela Hantuchová and then to Jana Čepelová in a tight match. Serbia then played play-offs to stay in the World Group, but lost to Germany 2–3. Ana Ivanovic won two singles matches, but Jovanovski lost her two, to Angelique Kerber in two sets, and then to Mona Barthel in three.

Her first win after the Australian Open was at Rome where she defeated former world No. 1, Caroline Wozniacki. In the second round, she lost to Jelena Janković. At the French Open, she reached round three losing in two tight sets to Svetlana Kuznetsova; in the second, she had defeated Wozniacki again. At Wimbledon, she reached the second round. Later in the summer, she played in Baku and New Haven. There, she won just one match. At the US Open, she beat Andrea Petkovic in the first round but lost to Petra Kvitová in round two.

At the Tashkent Open Jovanovski won her second WTA Tour title, coming through seven matches in eight days. She defeated Olga Govortsova in the final in three sets. In Guangzhou, Jovanovski defeated Sorana Cîrstea in round one. But she lost in the second round to Vania King, despite winning nine games in a row after the first set loss. She also won the title at the WTA 125 event in Ningbo, beating Zhang Shuai in the final, again in three sets.

In Beijing, Jovanovski once again defeated Cîrstea. But in the second round she was declassed by home favourite, Li Na, with Jovanovski winning just one game. She finished the season in a better way, reaching the quarterfinals of Luxembourg where she defeated 2011 Roland Garros champion, Francesca Schiavone, in round one, and Hsieh Su-wei. In the quarterfinals, she lost to the top seed and eventual champion Wozniacki, in three sets.

=== 2014 ===
Jovanovski started season playing in Shenzhen, suffering a first round loss to German qualifier Anna-Lena Friedsam. She then beat Annika Beck and Olivia Rogowska in Hobart, before losing to top seed Samantha Stosur in the quarterfinals. At the Australian Open, Jovanovski wasn't seeded at first. But after the withdrawal of Jamie Hampton who was seeded, Bojana became the 33rd seed and she was moved to the other side of draw. She started well with a three-set win over Jana Čepelová, but lost in the second round to Yvonne Meusburger.

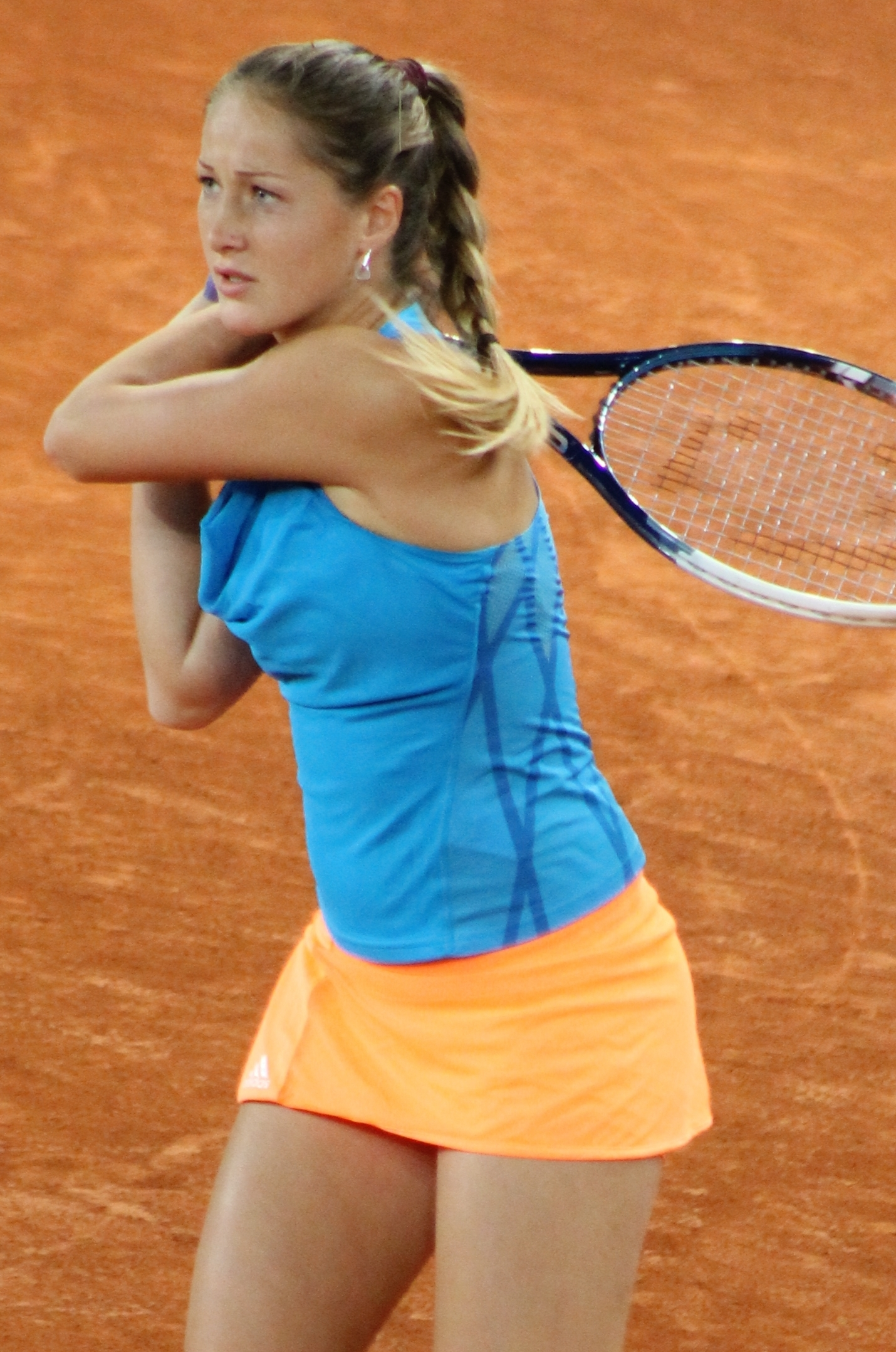
Jovanovski at the 2014 French Open

After Melbourne, Jovanovski moved seven places down on rankings. But, worse still, suffered a wrist injury, and faced a spell on the sidelines. She tried to play at the Indoors in Paris, but lost to Andrea Petkovic. As a result, she was forced to withdraw from the tournaments in Doha, Dubai and also the Fed Cup.

Consequences of injuries continued for the results. Jovanovski lost convincingly at next four events in Acapulco, Indian Wells, Miami, and also first clay tournament of season in Marrakech, winning a total of just two matches.

In Oeiras, Jovanovski defeated Monica Puig in round one to face Elena Vesnina in round two, serving for the match and holding a match point for her first quarterfinal since Hobart, but lost in three sets. In the first round of Madrid, she outclassed Karin Knapp but lost in the second round to countrywoman Ana Ivanovic. With that loss in Madrid, Jovanovski lost then six times in a row, including Roland Garros.

Jovanovski travelled to Wimbledon with a 7–15 win–loss season record, but scored her first win since Madrid with victory over Johanna Larsson. After that she came up with her best performance of the year, stunning eighth seed Victoria Azarenka in three sets to reach the third round. It was her fourth top-10 win. She, however, missed a big chance to reach next round, falling to Czech qualifier and world No. 176, Tereza Smitková. Jovanovski had a match point in the second set, then served two times for the match in final set (incl. another match point), but couldn't cross the finishing line. She also played in doubles, partnering with Eva Hrdinová, and mixed doubles too, with Mate Pavić, losing in the second round in both competitions.

Jovanovski then played in Istanbul, losing in the second round. Jovanovski then played in Baku, and reached second final at that tournament after beating Stefanie Vögele. She lost in two sets to Elina Svitolina in final. This was the first final which she lost, after winning her previous two. She went on to North America where the first tournament she played was at Washington. Although being tired, she reached the quarterfinals, losing to Marina Erakovic for the second time in a year. She arrived in Montreal but soon found a downturn in form. All of her next series of matches in North America were lost in two sets: in Montreal, Cincinnati, New Haven and the US Open. Moving to Asia, Jovanovski reached the Tashkent final, losing to Karin Knapp. She played three tournaments in China, winning not a single match.

=== 2015 ===
Jovanovski played two Australian Open warm-up events, and reached the second round of both. At the Australian Open itself, she lost in the first round to Roberta Vinci. Bad form continued, with losses in the first round of Doha and Kuala Lumpur. She, however, managed to win one match in both Indian Wells and Miami, with a notable scalp coming against Mona Barthel in Miami.

The clay court season began for Jovanovski in Marrakesh where she lost to third seed Flavia Pennetta. In Madrid, she played qualifying but lost there in the second round to Mariana Duque. However, at the next tournament in Rome, Jovanovski finally won back-to-back matches. After winning two in qualifying, she then beat top players to reach third round, Caroline Garcia and top-20 player Madison Keys. She was finally stopped in round three by Maria Sharapova.

=== 2016–2017: Surgery and rehabilitation ===
With the condition of her wrist and right shoulder that has been bothering her for the past three seasons worsening, Jovanovski played in only five matches in 2016, each time losing in the first round in straight sets. Following the French Open first-round loss to Agnieszka Radwańska, Jovanovski said that she was going to miss all tournaments on grass court, including Wimbledon, to prepare for the second half of the season. However, after unsuccessfully trying to rehabilitate with various non-surgery methods she notified the public in early July 2016 that on the advice of Spanish doctors, she has decided to undergo surgery in an attempt to continue with her tennis career. With expected recovery period of four to five months, Jovanovski said she expects to be back in time for the Australian series in January 2017. In an interview in September 2016, Jovanovski said she hopes to return to practice in November and that, although she could use protected ranking to play in the Australian Open, she doesn't want to use it for a tournament she isn't ready for, only wanting to return once she is fit, and deemed it unlikely to play in tournaments before February 2017.

In July 2017, after having her first training after more than a year, it was speculated Jovanovski might return to court in autumn. Later in July, she said she doesn't want to squander wildcards for tournaments at the end of the season when it is unrealistic for her to be completely ready and said she will most likely be ready for the beginning of 2018. In September, Jovanovski confirmed that she will return to court in early 2018.

=== 2018: Return from injury, comeback ===
After almost a two-year layoff due to injury, Jovanovski played her first tournament at St. Petersburg in late January. She lost in the first round of qualifying to Océane Dodin, in straight sets. She then resumed playing ITF tournaments in mid-April.

On 28 November, she announced her retirement from pro tour.

=== 2021: Failed second comeback ===
Jovanovski became eligible to play professional tournaments again from 28 November 2020 by submitting to be available for out-of-competition doping tests. However, it was later announced that she would retire on 20 November 2021 without having played a single comeback match.

== Playing style and equipment ==
Jovanovski is an aggressive baseline player. She cites forehand as her favourite shot and hard as her favourite court surface, and stated she would like to improve her court movement and become mentally stronger. Since the 2011 US Open she wears Adidas instead of Nike sports gear and uses Head rackets.

== Personal life ==
Jovanovski was born to father Zoran, a former football player, and mother Snežana, and also has a sister Viktorija. Her father and coach Zoran Jovanovski introduced her to tennis when she was aged 7. Jovanovski cites Maria Sharapova as her idol for being "an aggressive player and a strong personality". She is good friends with Serbian tennis player Jelena Janković. Jovanovski is fluent in Serbian and English. Besides Head, Jovanovski is also sponsored by Knjaz Miloš. In November 2016 she married her boyfriend Miloš Petrović.

=== National identity ===
During an ITF tournament in Dubai in December 2010, it was rumoured Jovanovski would play for Macedonia, reportedly for "being in the shadow of Jelena and Ana". Her father and coach Zoran Jovanovski denied the rumours at once, saying that "Bojana had never even been in Macedonia" and that the rumour was "made up because of her surname".

== Performance timelines ==
Key
| W | F | SF | QF | #R | RR | Q# | P# | DNQ | A | Z# | PO | G | S | B | NMS | NTI | P | NH |

(W) winner; (F) finalist; (SF) semifinalist; (QF) quarterfinalist; (#R) rounds 4, 3, 2, 1; (RR) round-robin stage; (Q#) qualification round; (P#) preliminary round; (DNQ) did not qualify; (A) absent; (Z#) Davis/Fed Cup Zonal Group (with number indication) or (PO) play-off; (G) gold, (S) silver or (B) bronze Olympic/Paralympic medal; (NMS) not a Masters tournament; (NTI) not a Tier I tournament; (P) postponed; (NH) not held; (SR) strike rate (events won / competed); (W–L) win–loss record.
To avoid confusion and double counting, these charts are updated at the conclusion of a tournament or when the player's participation has ended.

Only main-draw results in WTA Tour, Grand Slam tournaments, Fed Cup and Olympic Games are included in win–loss records.

=== Singles ===
| Tournament | 2009 | 2010 | 2011 | 2012 | 2013 | 2014 | 2015 | 2016 | 2017 | 2018 | SR | W–L | Win % |
|---|---|---|---|---|---|---|---|---|---|---|---|---|---|
Grand Slam tournaments
| Australian Open | A | Q3 | 2R | 1R | 4R | 2R | 1R | 1R | A | A | 0 / 6 | 5–6 | 45% |
| French Open | A | Q2 | 1R | 1R | 3R | 1R | 2R | 1R | A | A | 0 / 6 | 3–6 | 33% |
| Wimbledon | A | 2R | 1R | 2R | 2R | 3R | 1R | A | A | Q1 | 0 / 6 | 5–6 | 45% |
| US Open | Q3 | 1R | 1R | 2R | 2R | 1R | 2R | A | A | Q2 | 0 / 6 | 3–6 | 33% |
| Win–loss | 0–0 | 1–2 | 1–4 | 2–4 | 7–4 | 3–4 | 2–4 | 0–2 | 0–0 | 0–0 | 0 / 24 | 16–24 | 40% |
National representation
| Fed Cup | WG2 | PO | PO | F | QF | PO | A | WG2 | A | A | 0 / 7 | 4–9 | 31% |
Premier Mandatory & 5
| Dubai / Qatar Open (Note: The first Premier 5 event of the year has switched back and forth between the Dubai Tennis Championships and the Qatar Ladies Open since 2009. Dubai was classified as a Premier 5 event from 2009 to 2011 before being succeeded by Doha for the 2012–2014 period. In 2015, Dubai regained its Premier 5 status while Doha was demoted to Premier status. The Premier 5 tournaments were reclassified as WTA 1000 tournaments in 2021.) | A | A | 1R | Q2 | A | A | A | A | A | A | 0 / 1 | 0–1 | 0% |
| Indian Wells Open | A | A | 1R | Q1 | 1R | 2R | 2R | A | A | A | 0 / 4 | 2–4 | 33% |
| Miami Open | A | A | 1R | 1R | 1R | 1R | 2R | A | A | A | 0 / 5 | 1–5 | 17% |
| Madrid Open | A | A | 2R | Q1 | 1R | 2R | Q2 | A | A | A | 0 / 3 | 2–3 | 40% |
| Italian Open | A | 1R | 1R | A | 2R | 1R | 3R | A | A | A | 0 / 5 | 3–5 | 38% |
| Canadian Open | A | Q2 | 2R | Q1 | A | 1R | A | A | A | A | 0 / 2 | 1–2 | 33% |
| Cincinnati Open | A | 2R | 1R | Q1 | A | Q1 | A | A | A | A | 0 / 2 | 1–2 | 33% |
| Pan Pacific / Wuhan Open (Note: In 2014, the Pan Pacific Open was downgraded to a Premier event and replaced by the Wuhan Open. The Premier 5 tournaments were reclassified as WTA 1000 tournaments in 2021.) | A | Q1 | 1R | 1R | A | 1R | A | A | A | A | 0 / 3 | 0–3 | 0% |
| China Open | A | 3R | 1R | 1R | 2R | 1R | 1R | A | A | A | 0 / 6 | 3–6 | 33% |
Career statistics
| Tournaments | 0 | 12 | 26 | 18 | 19 | 26 | 21 | 4 | – | 1 | 127 | | |
| Titles | 0 | 0 | 0 | 1 | 1 | 0 | 0 | 0 | – | 0 | 2 | | |
| Finals | 0 | 0 | 0 | 1 | 1 | 2 | 0 | 0 | – | 0 | 4 | | |
| Hard win–loss | 0–0 | 4–8 | 13–19 | 16–14 | 17–15 | 16–17 | 13–14 | 0–3 | – | 0–1 | 2 / 88 | 79–91 | 46% |
| Clay win–loss | 0–0 | 2–4 | 2–5 | 1–2 | 2–4 | 2–8 | 3–4 | 0–1 | – | 0–0 | 0 / 24 | 12–28 | 30% |
| Grass win–loss | 0–0 | 1–1 | 1–3 | 1–2 | 3–3 | 2–3 | 1–3 | 0–0 | – | 0–0 | 0 / 15 | 9–15 | 38% |
| Overall win–loss | 0–0 | 7–13 | 16–27 | 18–18 | 22–22 | 20–28 | 17–21 | 0–4 | – | 0–1 | 2 / 127 | 100–134 | |
| Win % | – | 35% | 37% | 50% | 50% | 42% | 45% | 0% | – | 0% | 43% | | |
| Year-end ranking | 189 | 71 | 65 | 56 | 36 | 58 | 76 | 604 | — | 550 | $2,195,549 | | |

=== Doubles ===
| Tournament | 2010 | 2011 | 2012 | 2013 | 2014 | 2015 | W–L |
|---|---|---|---|---|---|---|---|
| Australian Open | A | 1R | 1R | 2R | 1R | 1R | 1–5 |
| French Open | A | 1R | A | 1R | 1R | 1R | 0–4 |
| Wimbledon | A | 1R | A | 1R | 2R | 1R | 1–4 |
| US Open | 1R | 1R | 1R | 1R | 1R | 1R | 0–6 |
| Win–loss | 0–1 | 0–4 | 0–2 | 1–4 | 1–4 | 0–4 | 2–19 |

== WTA Tour finals ==
=== Singles: 4 (2 titles, 2 runner-ups) ===
| Legend International (2–2) | Finals by surface Hard (2–2) |

| Result | W–L | Date | Tournament | Tier | Surface | Opponent | Score |
|---|---|---|---|---|---|---|---|
| Win | 1–0 | Jul 2012 | Baku Cup, Azerbaijan | International | Hard | (United States) Julia Cohen | 6–3, 6–1 |
| Win | 2–0 | Sep 2013 | Tashkent Open, Uzbekistan | International | Hard | (Belarus) Olga Govortsova | 4–6, 7–5, 7–6^{(7–3)} |
| Loss | 2–1 | Jul 2014 | Baku Cup, Azerbaijan | International | Hard | (Ukraine) Elina Svitolina | 1–6, 6–7^{(2–7)} |
| Loss | 2–2 | Sep 2014 | Tashkent Open, Uzbekistan | International | Hard | (Italy) Karin Knapp | 2–6, 6–7^{(4–7)} |

== WTA 125 finals ==
=== Singles: 1 (title) ===
| Result | W–L | Date | Tournament | Surface | Opponent | Score |
|---|---|---|---|---|---|---|
| Win | 1–0 | Sep 2013 | Ningbo International Open, China | Hard | (China) Zhang Shuai | 6–7^{(7–9)}, 6–4, 6–1 |

== ITF Circuit finals ==
=== Singles (4 titles, 4 runner-ups) ===
| Legend $75,000 tournaments $50,000 tournaments $25,000 tournaments $10,000 tournaments | Finals by surface Hard (1–2) Clay (3–1) Carpet (0–1) |

| Result | W–L | Date | Tournament | Tier | Surface | Opponent | Score |
|---|---|---|---|---|---|---|---|
| Win | 1–0 | Jul 2008 | ITF Prokuplje, Serbia | 10,000 | Clay | (Slovakia) Karin Morgošová | 6–0, 6–1 |
| Win | 2–0 | Aug 2008 | ITF Vinkovci, Croatia | 10,000 | Clay | (Serbia) Zorica Petrov | 6–1, 6–3 |
| Win | 3–0 | Sep 2008 | ITF Brčko, Bosnia and Herzegovina | 10,000 | Clay | (France) Gracia Radovanović | 6–4, 3–6, 6–2 |
| Loss | 3–1 | Dec 2008 | Delhi Open, India | 50,000 | Hard | (Czech Republic) Sandra Záhlavová | 4–6, 3–6 |
| Loss | 3–2 | Nov 2009 | Pune Championships, India | 50,000 | Hard | (Japan) Rika Fujiwara | 7–5, 4–6, 3–6 |
| Loss | 3–3 | Nov 2009 | Toyota World Challenge, Japan | 75,000 | Carpet (i) | (Japan) Kimiko Date-Krumm | 5–7, 2–6 |
| Loss | 3–4 | Dec 2010 | Dubai Tennis Challenge, UAE | 75,000 | Clay | (India) Sania Mirza | 6–4, 3–6, 0–6 |
| Win | 4–4 | Dec 2010 | Pune Championships, India | 25,000 | Hard | (Russia) Nina Bratchikova | 6–4, 6–4 |

=== Doubles: 1 (runner-up) ===
| Result | Date | Tournament | Tier | Surface | Partner | Opponents | Score |
|---|---|---|---|---|---|---|---|
| Loss | Nov 2008 | Pune Championships, India | 25,000 | Hard | (Romania) Elora Dabija | (Chinese Taipei) Chang Kai-chen (Chinese Taipei) Hwang I-hsuan | 7–5, 2–6, [7–10] |

== Team competition ==
=== Fed Cup ===
| Result | Date | Team competition | Surface | Partner/Team | Opponents | Score |
|---|---|---|---|---|---|---|
| Loss | Nov 2012 | Fed Cup, Czech Republic | Hard (i) | (Serbia) Ana Ivanovic (Serbia) Jelena Janković (Serbia) Aleksandra Krunić | (Czech Republic) Petra Kvitová (Czech Republic) Lucie Šafářová (Czech Republic) Lucie Hradecká (Czech Republic) Andrea Hlaváčková | 1–3 |

==== Singles (4–9) ====
| Outcome | Edition | Round | Opponent team | Surface | Opponent | Score |
|---|---|---|---|---|---|---|
| Loss | 2010 | World Group Play-offs | Slovakia | Clay (i) | Daniela Hantuchová | 2–6, 2–6 |
| Win | 2010 | World Group Play-offs | Slovakia | Clay (i) | Magdaléna Rybáriková | 6–1, 7–6^{(7–4)} |
| Win | 2011 | World Group II | Canada | Hard (i) | Aleksandra Wozniak | 6–4, 7–5 |
| Win | 2011 | World Group II | Canada | Hard (i) | Rebecca Marino | 7–6^{(7–3)}, 6–3 |
| Loss | 2011 | World Group Play-offs | Slovakia | Clay (i) | Dominika Cibulková | 6–4, 3–6, 1–6 |
| Loss | 2012 | World Group | Belgium | Hard (i) | Yanina Wickmayer | 4–6, 4–6 |
| Win | 2012 | World Group | Belgium | Hard (i) | Kirsten Flipkens | 6–2, 6–4 |
| Lose | 2013 | World Group | Slovakia | Hard (i) | Daniela Hantuchová | 5–7, 2–6 |
| Loss | 2013 | World Group | Slovakia | Hard (i) | Jana Čepelová | 7–5, 5–7, 9–11 |
| Loss | 2013 | World Group Play-offs | Germany | Hard (i) | Angelique Kerber | 5–7, 2–6 |
| Loss | 2013 | World Group Play-offs | Germany | Hard (i) | Mona Barthel | 1–6, 6–3, 3–6 |
| Loss | 2014 | World Group II Play-offs | Romania | Clay | Simona Halep | 2–6, 4–6 |
| Loss | 2014 | World Group II Play-offs | Romania | Clay | Sorana Cîrstea | 3–6, 7–6^{(9–7)}, 3–6 |

==== Doubles (2–2) ====
| Outcome | Edition | Round | Opponent team | Surface | Partner | Opponents | Score |
|---|---|---|---|---|---|---|---|
| Loss | 2010 | World Group Play-offs | Slovakia | Clay (i) | Jelena Janković | Hantuchová; Rybáriková | 4–6, 3–6 |
| Win | 2011 | World Group II | Canada | Hard (i) | Aleksandra Krunić | Fichman; Pelletier | 7–6^{(7–5)}, 6–4 |
| Win | 2012 | World Group | Belgium | Hard (i) | Aleksandra Krunić | Van Uytvanck; Wickmayer | 7–6^{(7–2)}, 4–6, 6–1 |
| Loss | 2012 | World Group Semifinals | Russia | Clay (i) | Aleksandra Krunić | Kirilenko; Vesnina | 4–6, 0–6 |

== Head-to-head records ==
=== Wins over top-10 players ===
| Season | 2010 | ... | 2013 | 2014 | Total |
|---|---|---|---|---|---|
| Wins | 1 | | 2 | 1 | 4 |

| # | Player | Rank | Event | Surface | Round | Score |
|---|---|---|---|---|---|---|
2010
| 1. | (Serbia) Jelena Janković | No. 6 | China Open | Hard | 2R | 4–6, 6–2, 6–2 |
2013
| 2. | (Denmark) Caroline Wozniacki | No. 10 | Italian Open | Clay | 1R | 2–6, 6–4, 7–6^{(7–5)} |
| 3. | (Denmark) Caroline Wozniacki | No. 10 | French Open | Clay | 2R | 7–6^{(7–2)}, 6–3 |
2014
| 4. | (Belarus) Victoria Azarenka | No. 9 | Wimbledon | Grass | 2R | 6–3, 3–6, 7–5 |

== Awards ==
- 2011 – Fed Cup Heart Award (World Group / World Group II first round)
- 2012 – Award of Olympic Committee of Serbia for Women's Team of the Year (as part of Serbia Fed Cup team)
