= Olga Govortsova =

Belarusian tennis player (born 1988)

Olga Govortsova Вольга Гаварцова
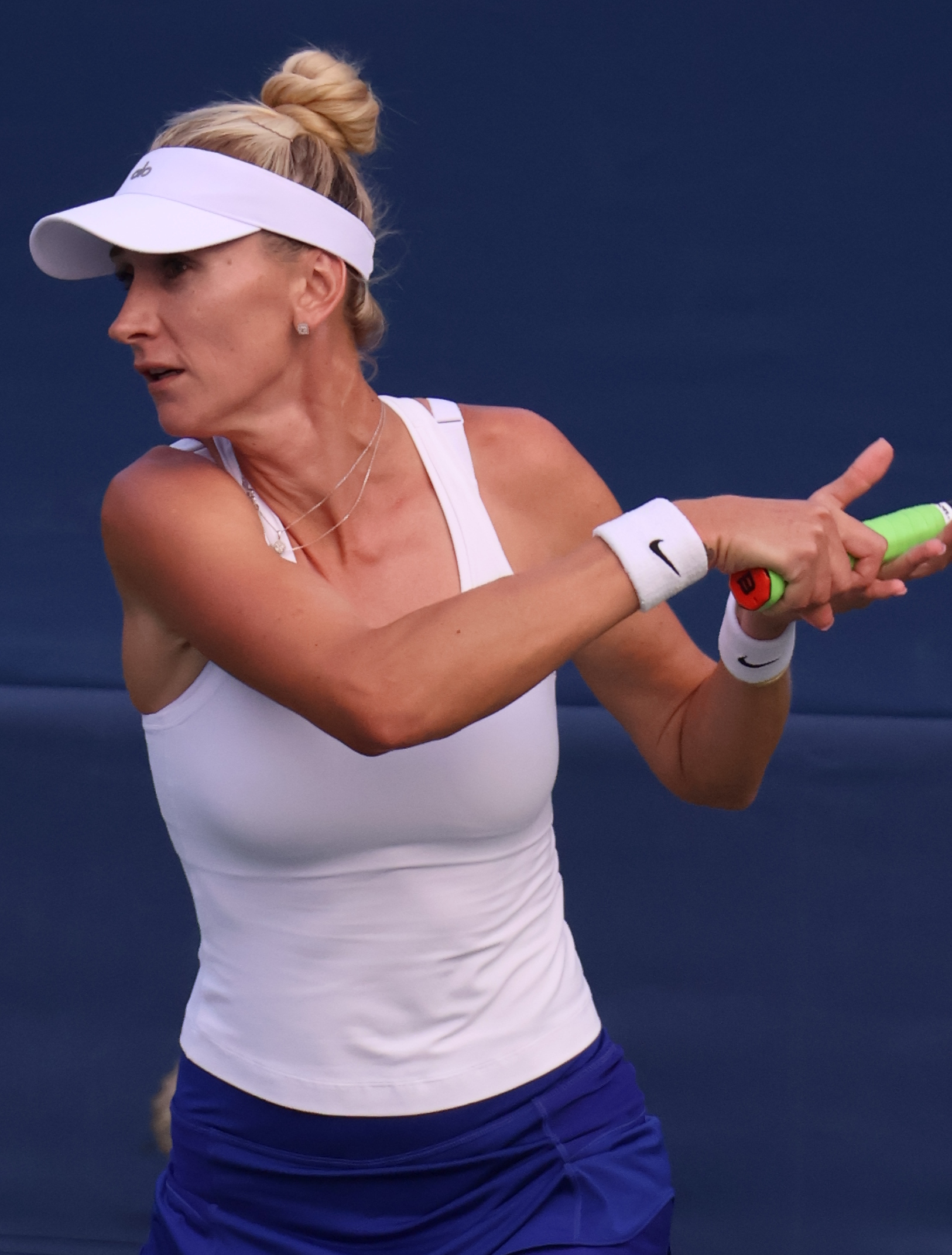
- Govortsova at the 2023 US Open
- Country (sports): Belarus
- Residence: Minsk, Belarus
- Born: 23 August 1988 (age 37) Pinsk, Byelorussian Soviet Socialist Republic, Soviet Union
- Height: 1.82 m (6 ft 0 in)
- Turned pro: 2002
- Plays: Right (two-handed backhand)
- Prize money: US$3,659,621

Singles
- Career record: 440–354
- Career titles: 9 ITF
- Highest ranking: No. 35 (23 June 2008)
- Current ranking: No. 1276 (24 April 2023)

Grand Slam singles results
- Australian Open: 2R (2012, 2013, 2014)
- French Open: 3R (2008, 2009)
- Wimbledon: 4R (2015)
- US Open: 3R (2012)

Doubles
- Career record: 189–184
- Career titles: 8 WTA, 1 WTA Challenger
- Highest ranking: No. 24 (29 August 2011)
- Current ranking: No. 1516 (8 June 2026)

Grand Slam doubles results
- Australian Open: 3R (2011)
- French Open: 3R (2010)
- Wimbledon: 3R (2012)
- US Open: 3R (2009)

Team competitions
- Fed Cup: 26–13
- Last updated on: 8 June 2026.

Olga Alekseyevna Govortsova (Belarusian: Вольга Аляксееўна Гаварцова (Volha Alyakseyeuna Havartsova); Ольга Алексеевна Говорцова; born 23 August 1988) is a Belarusian professional tennis player. On 23 June 2008, she achieved a career-high singles ranking of world No. 35. On 29 August 2011, she peaked at No. 24 in the doubles rankings.

== Tennis career ==
=== 2008 ===
She reached her first WTA Tour final at the 2008 Memphis Championships but lost in straight sets to Lindsay Davenport.

Govortsova has been sponsored by Wilson and Chinese clothing company Peak. She is represented by French-based sports agency Lagardère Unlimited.

=== 2009 ===
She began her 2009 season at the Brisbane International, where she defeated eighth seed Francesca Schiavone en route to the quarterfinals. However, she fell against world No. 41, Sara Errani. At the Australian Open, she received main-draw entry but lost in straight sets against 20th seed Amélie Mauresmo in the first round.

She then played in Indian Wells, a Premier-Mandatory event where she defeated British Anne Keothavong in the first round before falling to Peng Shuai. In Miami, at the second Premier-Mandatory event, she lost in the first round to Belarusian qualifier Anastasiya Yakimova.

In October, she reached the final of the Kremlin Cup, losing to Francesca Schiavone.

=== 2010 ===
Govortsova started the new year at the Brisbane International where she lost in the first round to Barbora Záhlavová-Strýcová. At the Sydney International she lost in the first qualifying round to Chanelle Scheepers.

At the Australian Open, she lost in the first round to Angelique Kerber.

At Amelia Island, she beat second seed Alona Bondarenko in the first round, and in the second round Anna Tatishvili, and in the quarterfinals Varvara Lepchenko, and in the semifinals third seed Dominika Cibulková, before losing her third WTA Tour singles final to Caroline Wozniacki.

=== 2013 ===
Govortsova reached her fourth WTA Tour singles final at the Tashkent Open, losing to top seed Bojana Jovanovski.

=== 2015 ===
At the Internationaux de Strasbourg, Govortsova retired in the first round when she played against Mirjana Lučić-Baroni. She failed to qualify for the French Open, losing in three sets to Alexa Glatch.

At Wimbledon, Govortsova advanced to the fourth round of a Grand Slam tournament for the first time, by defeating opponents such as Alizé Cornet (who had beaten Serena Williams the previous year) and Magdaléna Rybáriková in the early rounds. She eventually lost to Madison Keys.

At the Rogers Cup, Govortsova qualified for the main draw and defeated Irina-Camelia Begu in her opening match, before losing to fifth seed Ana Ivanovic in straight sets.

== Performance timelines ==
Key
W	F	SF	QF	#R	RR	Q#	P#	DNQ	A	Z#	PO	G	S	B	NMS	NTI	P	NH

(W) winner; (F) finalist; (SF) semifinalist; (QF) quarterfinalist; (#R) rounds 4, 3, 2, 1; (RR) round-robin stage; (Q#) qualification round; (P#) preliminary round; (DNQ) did not qualify; (A) absent; (Z#) Davis/Fed Cup Zonal Group (with number indication) or (PO) play-off; (G) gold, (S) silver or (B) bronze Olympic/Paralympic medal; (NMS) not a Masters tournament; (NTI) not a Tier I tournament; (P) postponed; (NH) not held; (SR) strike rate (events won / competed); (W–L) win–loss record.
To avoid confusion and double counting, these charts are updated at the conclusion of a tournament or when the player's participation has ended.

Only main-draw results of WTA Tour, Grand Slam tournaments and Olympic Games are included in win–loss records.

=== Singles ===
Current through the 2022 Australian Open.

Tournament	2006	2007	2008	2009	2010	2011	2012	2013	2014	2015	2016	2017	2018	2019	2020	2021	2022	2023	SR	W–L	Win %
Grand Slam tournaments
Australian Open	A	A	1R	1R	1R	1R	2R	2R	2R	Q3	1R	Q1	A	Q3	Q2	Q1	Q3	A	0 / 8	3–8	27%
French Open	A	A	3R	3R	2R	2R	2R	1R	1R	Q1	1R	Q1	A	A	A	1R	Q1	Q1	0 / 9	7–9	44%
Wimbledon	A	2R	1R	2R	1R	1R	2R	1R	1R	4R	1R	Q1	A	A	NH	1R	A	A	0 / 11	6–11	35%
US Open	A	2R	2R	1R	1R	1R	3R	1R	1R	2R	Q1	A	Q3	Q2	2R	Q1	A	Q1	0 / 10	6–10	38%
Win–loss	0–0	2–2	3–4	3–4	1–4	1–4	5–4	1–4	1–4	4–2	0–3	0–0	0–0	0–0	1–1	0–2	0–0	0–0	0 / 38	22–38	37%
National representation
Summer Olympics	NH		1R	NH			A	NH			A	NH				A			0 / 1	0–1	0%
WTA 1000
Dubai / Qatar Open (Note: The first Premier 5 event of the year has switched back and forth between the Dubai Tennis Championships and the Qatar Ladies Open since 2009. Dubai was classified as a Premier 5 event from 2009 to 2011 before being succeeded by Doha for the 2012–2014 period. In 2015, Dubai regained its Premier 5 status while Doha was demoted to Premier status. The Premier 5 tournaments were reclassified as WTA 1000 tournaments in 2021.)	NMS		2R	1R	3R	A	A	1R	A	A	A	A	A	A	A	A	A		0 / 4	3–4	43%
Indian Wells Open	A	A	2R	2R	2R	1R	1R	2R	Q1	A	1R	A	A	A	NH	Q2	Q1		0 / 7	3–7	30%
Miami Open	A	A	1R	1R	1R	1R	Q1	2R	2R	A	1R	A	A	A	NH	Q2	Q1		0 / 7	2–7	22%
Madrid Open	NH			Q1	2R	1R	A	Q1	Q1	1R	A	A	A	A	NH	A			0 / 3	1–3	25%
Italian Open	A	A	2R	A	1R	Q1	1R	Q1	A	A	A	A	A	A	A	A			0 / 3	1–3	25%
Canadian Open	A	A	1R	A	1R	Q1	A	Q1	A	2R	Q2	A	A	A	NH	A			0 / 3	1–3	25%
Cincinnati Open	NMS			2R	1R	Q2	Q2	Q2	A	Q2	A	A	A	A	A	A			0 / 2	1–2	33%
Pan Pacific / Wuhan Open (Note: In 2014, the Pan Pacific Open was downgraded to a Premier event and replaced by the Wuhan Open. The Premier 5 tournaments were reclassified as WTA 1000 tournaments in 2021.)	A	A	A	A	2R	A	A	A	A	Q1	A	A	A	A	NH				0 / 1	1–1	50%
China Open	NMS			1R	2R	Q1	1R	A	Q1	A	A	A	A	A	NH				0 / 3	1–3	25%
Career statistics
	2006	2007	2008	2009	2010	2011	2012	2013	2014	2015	2016	2017	2018	2019	2020	2021	2022		Career		
Tournaments	1	12	26	24	27	19	19	14	12	11	11	0	1	1	3	5	0		Career total: 186		
Titles	0	0	0	0	0	0	0	0	0	0	0	0	0	0	0	0	0		Career total: 0		
Finals	0	0	1	1	1	0	0	1	0	0	0	0	0	0	0	0	0		Career total: 4		
Hard Win–loss	0–1	12–9	12–17	17–15	7–17	4–11	8–10	10–9	5–8	2–5	2–8	0–0	1–1	0–1	3–3	0–1	0–0		0 / 113	83–115	42%
Clay Win–loss	0–0	0–1	8–6	5–6	6–7	1–6	3–8	2–3	0–2	1–4	0–4	0–0	0–0	0–0	0–0	0–3	0–0		0 / 50	26–50	34%
Grass Win–loss	0–0	2–2	1–3	4–3	0–3	1–2	1–2	0–2	0–2	4–2	0–1	0–0	0–0	0–0	0–0	0–1	0–0		0 / 23	13–23	36%
Overall win–loss	0–1	14–12	21–26	26–24	13–27	6–19	12–20	12–14	5–12	7–11	2–13	0–0	1–1	0–1	3–3	0–5	0–0		0 / 186	122–189	39%
Win %	0%	54%	45%	52%	33%	24%	38%	46%	29%	39%	13%	–	50%	0%	50%	0%			Career total: 39%		
Year-end ranking	334	49	49	52	74	114	57	95	145	69	199	271	427	194	133	134	607		$3,544,459		

=== Doubles ===
Current after the season of 2021.

Tournament	2006	2007	2008	2009	2010	2011	2012	2013	2014	2015	2016	2017	2018	2019	2020	2021	2022	SR	W–L	Win %
Grand Slam tournaments
Australian Open	A	A	2R	1R	1R	3R	1R	2R	1R	A	1R	A	A	A	A	A	A	0 / 8	4–8	33%
French Open	A	A	1R	1R	3R	1R	2R	2R	1R	A	A	A	A	A	A	A	A	0 / 7	4–7	36%
Wimbledon	A	A	1R	A	2R	2R	3R	1R	A	A	A	A	A	A	NH	A	A	0 / 5	4–5	44%
US Open	A	1R	1R	3R	2R	1R	1R	1R	A	2R	A	A	A	A	A	A	A	0 / 8	4–8	33%
Win–loss	0–0	0–1	1–4	2–3	4–4	3–4	3–4	2–4	0–2	1–1	0–1	0–0	0–0	0–0	0–0	0–0	0–0	0 / 28	16–28	36%
National representation
Summer Olympics	NH		2R	NH			A	NH			A	NH				A	NH	0 / 1	1–1	50%
WTA 1000
Dubai / Qatar Open	NMS		A	A	A	A	A	1R	A	A	A	A	A	A	A	A	A	0 / 1	0–1	0%
Indian Wells Masters	A	A	A	A	1R	1R	1R	1R	A	A	A	A	A	A	NH	A	A	0 / 4	0–4	0%
Miami Open	A	A	A	A	2R	1R	1R	1R	A	A	A	A	A	A	NH	A		0 / 4	1–4	20%
Madrid Open	NH			A	1R	1R	A	2R	A	A	A	A	A	A	NH	A		0 / 3	1–3	25%
Italian Open	A	A	A	A	2R	1R	1R	2R	A	A	A	A	A	A	A	A		0 / 4	2–3	40%
Canadian Open	A	A	A	A	1R	2R	A	2R	A	A	A	A	A	A	NH	A		0 / 3	2–3	40%
Cincinnati Masters	NMS			A	1R	1R	1R	A	A	A	A	A	A	A	A	A		0 / 3	0–3	0%
China Open	NMS			1R	W	1R	1R	1R	2R	A	A	A	A	A	NH			1 / 5	6–5	55%
Career statistics
	2006	2007	2008	2009	2010	2011	2012	2013	2014	2015	2016	2017	2018	2019	2020	2021	2022	Career		
Tournaments	1	3	18	15	26	21	18	19	9	2	2	0	0	1	0	2	0	Career total: 137		
Titles	0	0	1	2	1	3	1	0	0	0	0	0	0	0	0	0	0	Career total: 8		
Finals	0	0	2	2	1	4	2	1	1	0	1	0	0	0	0	0	0	Career total: 14		
Overall win–loss	0–1	1–3	15–17	13–13	26–25	20–17	16–16	13–19	6–9	1–2	4–3	1–1	0–0	1–1	0–0	1–2	0–0	8 / 137	118–129	48%
Win %	0%	25%	47%	50%	51%	54%	50%	41%	40%	33%	57%	50%	–	50%	–	33%		Career total: 48%		
Year-end ranking	467	404	58	72	29	44	61	60	137	364	247	493	753	199	251	507				

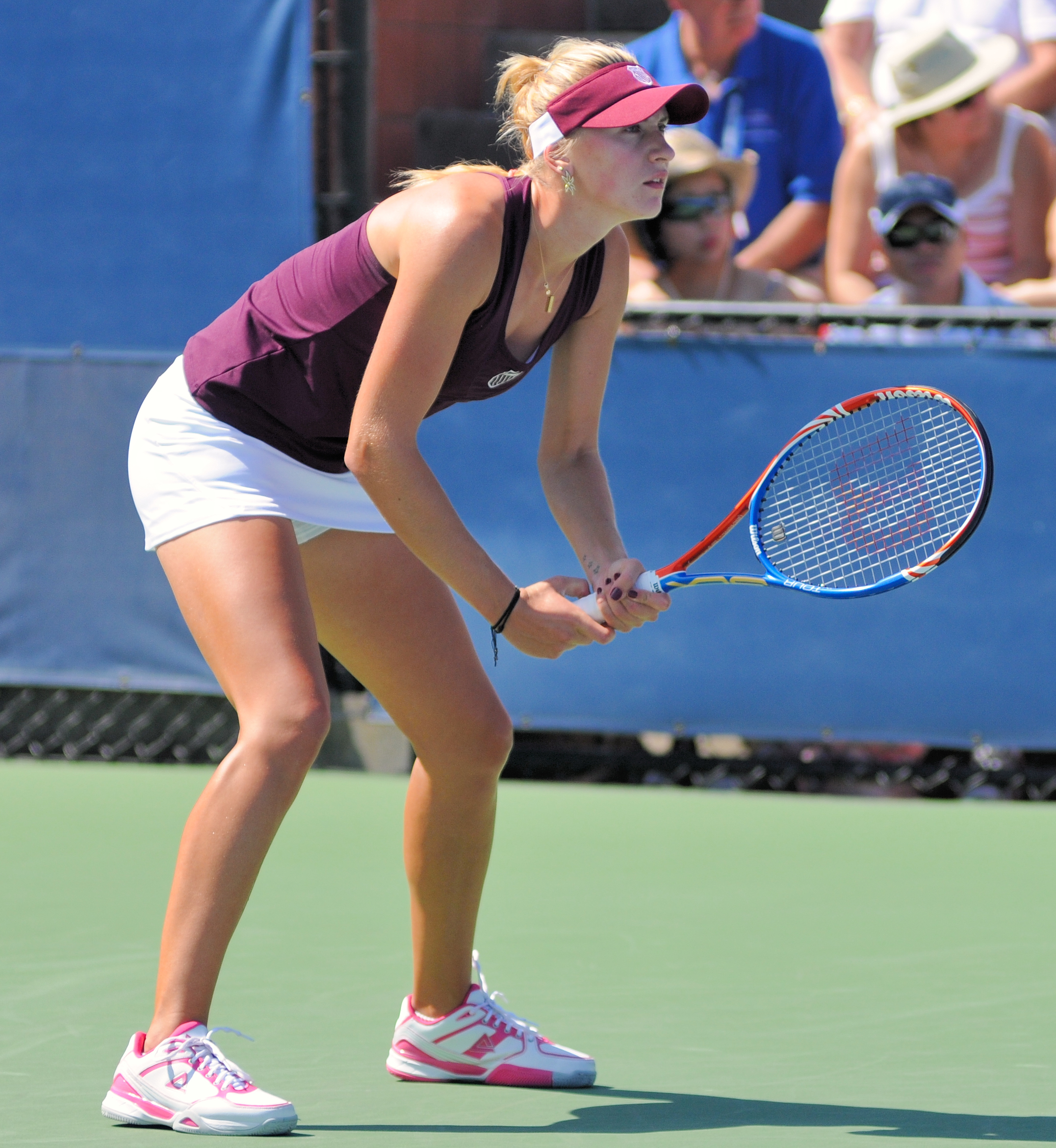
Govortsova at the 2010 US Open

== Significant finals ==
=== Premier Mandatory/Premier 5 tournaments ===
==== Doubles: 2 (1 title, 1 runner-up) ====
Result	Year	Tournament	Surface	Partner	Opponents	Score
Loss	2008	Charleston Open	Hard	(Romania) Edina Gallovits	(Slovenia) Katarina Srebotnik (Japan) Ai Sugiyama	2–6, 2–6
Win	2010	China Open	Hard	(Chinese Taipei) Chuang Chia-jung	(Argentina) Gisela Dulko (Italy) Flavia Pennetta	7–6^{(7–2)}, 1–6, [10–7]

== WTA Tour career finals ==
=== Singles: 4 (4 runner-ups) ===
Legend (pre/post 2009)
Grand Slam
WTA 1000
Premier / WTA 500 (0–1)
Tier III / International / WTA 250 (0–3)

Result	W–L	Date	Tournament	Tier	Surface	Opponent	Score
Loss	0–1	Mar 2008	National Indoor Championships, U.S.	Tier III	Hard (i)	(United States) Lindsay Davenport	2–6, 1–6
Loss	0–2	Oct 2009	Kremlin Cup, Russia	Premier	Hard (i)	(Italy) Francesca Schiavone	3–6, 0–6
Loss	0–3	Apr 2010	Amelia Island Championships, U.S.	International	Clay	(Denmark) Caroline Wozniacki	2–6, 5–7
Loss	0–4	Sep 2013	Tashkent Open, Uzbekistan	International	Hard	(Serbia) Bojana Jovanovski	6–4, 5–7, 6–7^{(3–7)}

=== Doubles: 14 (8 titles, 6 runner-ups) ===
Legend (pre/post 2009)
Grand Slam tournaments
Tier I / Premier 5 & M / WTA 1000 (1–1)
Premier / WTA 500 (1–0)
Tier III / International / WTA 250 (6–5)

Result	W–L	Date	Tournament	Tier	Surface	Partner	Opponents	Score
Loss	0–1	Apr 2008	Charleston Open, U.S.	Tier I	Clay	(Romania) Edina Gallovits	(Slovenia) Katarina Srebotnik (Japan) Ai Sugiyama	2–6, 2–6
Win	1–1	May 2008	İstanbul Cup, Turkey	Tier III	Clay	(United States) Jill Craybas	(New Zealand) Marina Erakovic (Slovenia) Polona Hercog	6–1, 6–2
Win	2–1	Sep 2009	Guangzhou Open, China	International	Hard	(Belarus) Tatiana Poutchek	(Japan) Kimiko Date-Krumm (China) Sun Tiantian	3–6, 6–2, [10–8]
Win	3–1	Sep 2009	Tashkent Open, Uzbekistan	International	Hard	(Belarus) Tatiana Poutchek	(Russia) Vitalia Diatchenko (Belarus) Ekaterina Dzehalevich	6–2, 6–7^{(1–7)}, [10–8]
Win	4–1	Oct 2010	China Open	Premier M	Hard	(Chinese Taipei) Chuang Chia-jung	(Argentina) Gisela Dulko (Italy) Flavia Pennetta	7–6^{(7–2)}, 1–6, [10–7]
Win	5–1	Feb 2011	National Indoor Championships, U.S.	International	Hard (i)	(Russia) Alla Kudryavtseva	(Czech Republic) Andrea Hlaváčková (Czech Republic) Lucie Hradecká	6–3, 4–6, [10–8]
Win	6–1	Jun 2011	Birmingham Classic, UK	International	Grass	(Russia) Alla Kudryavtseva	(Italy) Sara Errani (Italy) Roberta Vinci	1–6, 6–1, [10–5]
Loss	6–2	Jul 2011	Washington Open, U.S.	International	Hard	(Russia) Alla Kudryavtseva	(India) Sania Mirza (Kazakhstan) Yaroslava Shvedova	3–6, 3–6
Win	7–2	Aug 2011	New Haven Open, U.S.	Premier	Hard	(Chinese Taipei) Chuang Chia-jung	(Italy) Sara Errani (Italy) Roberta Vinci	7–5, 6–2
Loss	7–3	Feb 2012	National Indoor Championships, U.S.	International	Hard (i)	(Russia) Vera Dushevina	(Czech Republic) Andrea Hlaváčková (Czech Republic) Lucie Hradecká	3–6, 4–6
Win	8–3	May 2012	Internationaux de Strasbourg, France	International	Clay	(Poland) Klaudia Jans-Ignacik	(South Africa) Natalie Grandin (Czech Republic) Vladimíra Uhlířová	6–7^{(4–7)}, 6–3, [10–3]
Loss	8–4	Sep 2013	Tashkent Open, Uzbekistan	International	Hard	(Luxembourg) Mandy Minella	(Hungary) Tímea Babos (Kazakhstan) Yaroslava Shvedova	3–6, 3–6
Loss	8–5	Apr 2014	Monterrey Open, Mexico	International	Hard	(Hungary) Tímea Babos	(Croatia) Darija Jurak (United States) Megan Moulton-Levy	6–7^{(5–7)}, 6–3, [9–11]
Loss	8–6	Sep 2016	Guangzhou Open, China	International	Hard	(Belarus) Vera Lapko	(United States) Asia Muhammad (China) Peng Shuai	2–6, 6–7^{(3–7)}

== WTA 125 finals ==
=== Singles: 1 (runner-up) ===
Result	W–L	Date	Tournament	Surface	Opponent	Score
Loss	0–1	Jul 2021	Swedish Open, Sweden	Clay	(Spain) Nuria Párrizas Díaz	2–6, 2–6

=== Doubles: 2 (1 title, 1 runner-up) ===
Result	W–L	Date	Tournament	Surface	Partner	Opponents	Score
Loss	0–1	Nov 2012	Taipei Challenger, Taiwan	Carpet (i)	(Chinese Taipei) Chang Kai-chen	(Chinese Taipei) Chan Hao-ching (France) Kristina Mladenovic	7–5, 2–6, [8–10]
Win	1–1	Jul 2021	Serbia Challenger Open, Serbia	Clay	(Belarus) Lidziya Marozava	(Russia) Alena Fomina-Klotz (Russia) Ekaterina Yashina	6–2, 6–2

== ITF Circuit finals ==
=== Singles: 16 (9 titles, 7 runner–ups) ===
Legend
$100,000 tournaments
$75/80,000 tournaments
$50/60,000 tournaments
$25,000 tournaments
$10,000 tournaments

Result	W–L	Date	Tournament	Tier	Surface	Opponent	Score
Loss	0–1	Nov 2003	ITF Ramat HaSharon, Israel	10,000	Hard	(Israel) Shahar Pe'er	1–6, 0–6
Loss	0–2	Nov 2003	ITF Haifa, Israel	10,000	Hard	(Israel) Shahar Pe'er	1–6, 7–6^{(4)}, 3–6
Loss	0–3	Feb 2007	ITF St. Paul, United States	50,000	Hard (i)	(Sweden) Sofia Arvidsson	6–2, 1–6, 4–6
Win	1–3	Mar 2007	ITF Minsk, Belarus	25,000	Carpet (i)	(Czech Republic) Eva Hrdinová	6–7^{(5)}, 6–2, 6–3
Win	2–3	Apr 2007	ITF Jackson, United States	25,000	Clay	(Mexico) Melissa Torres Sandoval	6–1, 6–1
Loss	2–4	May 2007	ITF Indian Harbour Beach, United States	50,000	Clay	(United States) Bethanie Mattek-Sands	5–7, 6–1, 1–6
Loss	2–5	May 2011	Nottingham Trophy, United Kingdom	75,000	Grass	(Greece) Eleni Daniilidou	6–1, 4–6, 2–6
Win	3–5	Feb 2012	Midland Tennis Classic, United States	100,000	Hard (i)	(Slovakia) Magdaléna Rybáriková	6–3, 6–7^{(6)}, 7–6^{(5)}
Win	4–5	Feb 2015	ITF Kreuzlingen, Switzerland	50,000	Carpet (i)	(Slovakia) Rebecca Šramková	6–2, 6–1
Win	5–5	Mar 2015	ITF Seville, Spain	25,000	Clay	(Belgium) Maryna Zanevska	7–5, 6–2
Loss	5–6	Aug 2016	Challenger de Granby, Canada	50,000	Hard	(United States) Jennifer Brady	5–7, 2–6
Win	6–6	Sep 2016	Zhuhai Open, China	50,000	Hard	(Turkey) İpek Soylu	6–1, 6–2
Win	7–6	Apr 2017	ITF Indian Harbour Beach, United States	80,000	Clay	(United States) Amanda Anisimova	6–3, 4–6, 6–3
Win	8–6	Jun 2019	ITF Darmstadt, Germany	25,000	Clay	(Denmark) Clara Tauson	6–1, 7–6^{(3)}
Loss	8–7	Jul 2019	ITF Stuttgart, Germany	25,000	Clay	(Romania) Georgia Crăciun	2–6, 3–6
Win	9–7	Feb 2020	Kentucky Open, United States	100,000	Hard (i)	(United States) Claire Liu	6–4, 6–4

=== Doubles: 9 (3 titles, 6 runner–ups) ===
Legend
$100,000 tournaments
$80,000 tournaments
$50/60,000 tournaments
$25,000 tournaments
$10,000 tournaments

Result	W–L	Date	Tournament	Tier	Surface	Partner	Opponents	Score
Win	1–0	Nov 2003	ITF Ramat HaSharon, Israel	10,000	Hard	(Belarus) Victoria Azarenka	(United Kingdom) Natalie Neri (Israel) Danielle Steinberg	6–0, 6–3
Loss	1–1	Apr 2004	ITF Bol, Croatia	10,000	Clay	(Belarus) Victoria Azarenka	(Russia) Anna Bastrikova (Russia) Alla Kudryavtseva	4–6, 1–6
Loss	1–2	Apr 2005	ITF Minsk, Belarus	10,000	Carpet (i)	(Ukraine) Kateryna Polunina	(Russia) Alexandra Panova (Russia) Olga Panova	5–7, 3–6
Loss	1–3	Aug 2016	Challenger de Granby, Canada	50,000	Hard	(Israel) Julia Glushko	(United States) Jamie Loeb (Belgium) An-Sophie Mestach	4–6, 4–6
Loss	1–4	Jan 2019	ITF Plantation, United States	25,000	Clay	(United States) Jada Robinson	(Chinese Taipei) Hsieh Yu-chieh (Chinese Taipei) Lee Pei-chi	1–6, 4–6
Win	2–4	Feb 2019	Midland Tennis Classic, United States	100,000	Hard (i)	(Russia) Valeria Savinykh	(United States) Coco Gauff (United States) Ann Li	6–4, 6–0
Win	3–4	Nov 2019	Las Vegas Open, United States	60,000	Hard	(Luxembourg) Mandy Minella	(United States) Sophie Chang (United States) Alexandra Mueller	6–3, 6–4
Loss	3–5	Jan 2021	Georgia's Rome Open, United States	60,000	Hard	(Serbia) Jovana Jović	(United States) Emina Bektas (United Kingdom) Tara Moore	7–5, 2–6, [8–10]
Loss	3–6	May 2022	ITF Bonita Springs, United States	100,000	Clay	(Poland) Katarzyna Kawa	(Hungary) Tímea Babos (Japan) Nao Hibino	4–6, 6–3, [7–10]

== Head-to-head record ==
Govortsova's match record against players who have been ranked world No. 10 or better is as follows:

- (United States) Lindsay Davenport 0–1
- (United States) Venus Williams 0–2
- (United States) Serena Williams 0–1
- (France) Amélie Mauresmo 0–1
- (Russia) Maria Sharapova 0–1
- (Serbia) Ana Ivanovic 0–3
- (Serbia) Jelena Janković 0–1
- (Denmark) Caroline Wozniacki 0–1
- (Belarus) Victoria Azarenka 1–1
- (Russia) Svetlana Kuznetsova 0–1
- (Czech Republic) Petra Kvitová 0–2
- (Poland) Agnieszka Radwańska 1–3
- (China) Li Na 0–4
- (Romania) Simona Halep 0–3
- (Ukraine) Elina Svitolina 0–1
- (Russia) Nadia Petrova 0–2
- (Russia) Elena Dementieva 0–3
- (Australia) Jelena Dokic 0–1
- (Italy) Francesca Schiavone 4–2
- (Australia) Samantha Stosur 1–0
- (Slovakia) Daniela Hantuchová 1–4
- (Russia) Anna Chakvetadze 0–1
- (Germany) Angelique Kerber 1–5
- (Italy) Sara Errani 0–2
- (Canada) Eugenie Bouchard 0–2
- (Czech Republic) Lucie Šafářová 0–2
- (Switzerland) Patty Schnyder 0–1
- (Russia) Nicole Vaidišová 1–0
- (France) Marion Bartoli 1–3
- (Czech Republic) Karolína Plíšková 1–0
- (Japan) Ai Sugiyama 1–1
- (Russia) Ekaterina Makarova 2–0
- (Spain) Carla Suárez Navarro 2–2
- (Germany) Andrea Petkovic 1–2
- (Italy) Flavia Pennetta 0–3
- (Russia) Maria Kirilenko 0–1
- (Slovakia) Dominika Cibulková 1–0

== World TeamTennis ==
Govortsova has played three seasons with World TeamTennis, making her debut in 2013 with the Sacramento Capitals. She has since played for the Springfield Lasers in 2014 and 2019 was announced to be joining the Lasers again during the 2020 WTT season set to begin 12 July.
