= Arina Folts =

Uzbekistani tennis player (born 1997)

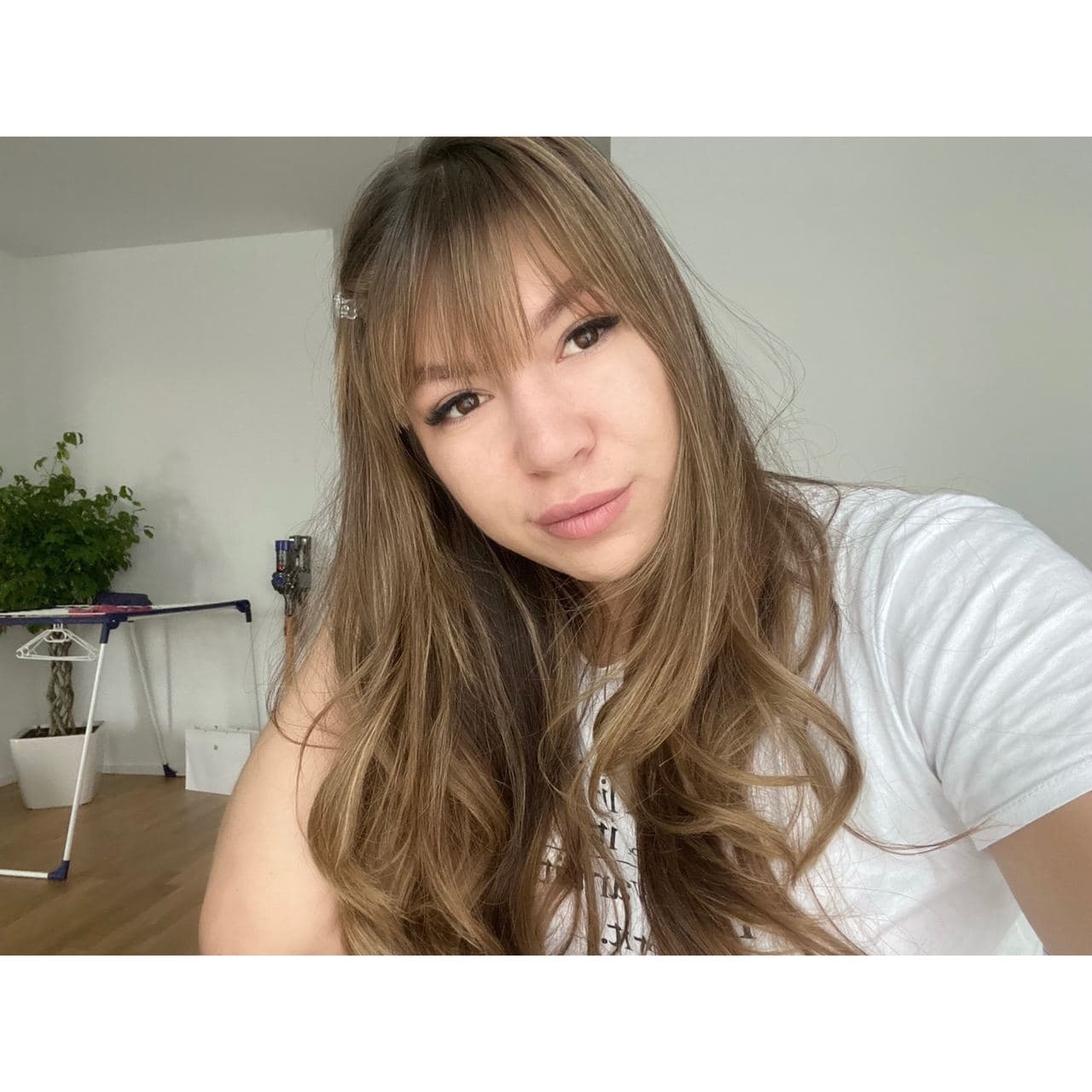
- Native name: Арина Фолц
- Country (sports): Uzbekistan
- Born: 1 January 1997 (age 28) Tashkent, Uzbekistan
- Plays: Right-handed (two-handed backhand)
- Prize money: $32,047

Singles
- Career record: 56–102
- Career titles: 0
- Highest ranking: No. 613 (2 March 2015)

Doubles
- Career record: 65–84
- Career titles: 2 ITF
- Highest ranking: No. 525 (24 July 2017)

Arina Folts (Russian: Арина Фолц; born 1 January 1997) is an Uzbekistani former tennis player.

Folts was awarded a wildcard to make her WTA Tour debut at the 2013 Tashkent Open, losing in the first round to María Teresa Torró Flor of Spain. She partnered with Guzal Yusupova to compete in the doubles event, but they lost to Veronika Kapshay and Teodora Mirčić in the first round.

Playing for Uzbekistan Fed Cup team, Folts has a win–loss record of 2–7.

== ITF finals ==
=== Doubles (2–5) ===
Legend $25,000 tournaments $10,000 tournaments	Finals by surface Hard (0–4) Clay (2–1)

Outcome	Date	Tournament	Surface	Partner	Opponents	Score
Runner-up	5 July 2014	Astana, Kazakhstan	Hard	(Russia) Ksenia Dmitrieva	(Belarus) Viktoryia Mun (Russia) Mariia Tcakanian	3–6, 4–6
Winner	16 November 2014	Antalya, Turkey	Clay	(Italy) Valeria Prosperi	(Romania) Irina Bara (Turkey) Melis Sezer	3–6, 7–6^{(4)} [10–5]
Runner-up	21 August 2015	İzmir, Turkey	Hard	(Turkey) Ayla Aksu	(Germany) Nora Niedmers (Germany) Julia Wachaczyk	6–7^{(4)}, 4–6
Runner-up	21 February 2016	Antalya, Turkey	Hard	(Greece) Eleni Daniilidou	(Romania) Elena Gabriela Ruse (Bulgaria) Petia Arshinkova	6–7^{(4)}, 0–6
Runner-up	30 October 2016	Antalya, Turkey	Hard	(Ukraine) Kateryna Sliusar	(Germany) Tayisiya Morderger (Germany) Yana Morderger	6–3, 6–7^{(5)}, [5–10]
Winner	19 March 2017	Hammamet, Tunisia	Clay	(Slovenia) Nina Potočnik	(France) Valentine Bacher (France) Emma Léné	6–4, 6–3
Runner-up	20 May 2017	Antalya, Turkey	Clay	(Croatia) Mariana Dražić	(Denmark) Emilie Francati (United States) Dasha Ivanova	2–6, 4–6

== Fed Cup participation ==
=== Singles ===
Edition	Stage	Date	Location	Against	Surface	Opponent	W/L	Score
2013 Fed Cup; Asia/Oceania Zone Group I	R/R	8 February 2013	Astana, Kazakhstan	(South Korea) South Korea	Hard (i)	(South Korea) Lee So-ra	L	3–6, 6–7^{(2–7)}

=== Doubles ===
Edition	Stage	Date	Location	Against	Surface	Partner	Opponents	W/L	Score
2013 Fed Cup; Asia/Oceania Zone Group I	R/R	7 February 2013	Astana, Kazakhstan	China	Hard (i)	(Uzbekistan) Sabina Sharipova	(China) Tang Haochen (China) Wang Qiang	L	1–6, 3–6
2014 Fed Cup; Asia/Oceania Zone Group I	R/R	6 February 2014	Astana, Kazakhstan	Chinese Taipei	Hard (i)	(Uzbekistan) Nigina Abduraimova	(Chinese Taipei) Chan Chin-wei (Chinese Taipei) Juan Ting-fei	W	6–0, 4–6, 6–4
2014 Fed Cup; Asia/Oceania Zone Group I	R/R	7 February 2014	Astana, Kazakhstan	South Korea	Hard (i)	(Uzbekistan) Alina Abdurakhimova	(South Korea) Han Na-lae (South Korea) Yoo Mi	W	2–6, 0–6
