= Mattias Siimar =

Estonian tennis player

- Country (sports): Estonia
- Residence: Tallinn, Estonia
- Born: 3 February 1998 (age 27) Tallinn, Estonia
- Plays: Left-handed (two handed-backhand)
- Prize money: $8,305

Singles
- Career record: 0–3 (at ATP Tour level and Grand Slam level)
- Career titles: 0
- Highest ranking: No. 1,036 (25 October 2021)

Grand Slam singles results
- Australian Open Junior: 2R (2016)
- Wimbledon Junior: 1R (2016)
- US Open Junior: 1R (2015)

Doubles
- Career record: 2–3 (at ATP Tour level and Grand Slam level)
- Highest ranking: No. 826 (8 November 2021)

Grand Slam doubles results
- Australian Open Junior: QF (2016)
- US Open Junior: 2R (2015)

Team competitions
- Davis Cup: 5–6
- Last updated on: 11 July 2022.

Mattias Siimar (born 3 February 1998) is an Estonian tennis player.

Siimar has a career high ATP singles ranking of 1036, achieved on 25 October 2021.

Playing for Estonia in Davis Cup, Siimar has a win–loss record of 5–6. His twin brother Kristofer Siimar is also a tennis player.

== ITF World Tennis Tour and Challenger finals ==
=== Singles: 1 (0–1) ===
Legend (singles) ATP Challenger Tour (0–0) ITF World Tennis Tour (0–1)	Titles by surface Hard (0–0) Clay (0–1) Grass (0–0) Carpet (0–0)

Result	W–L	Date	Tournament	Tier	Surface	Opponent	Score
Loss	0–1	Aug 2021	M15 Pärnu, Estonia	World Tennis Tour	Clay	(Turkey) Ergi Kırkın	7–5, 3–6, 3–6

== Davis Cup ==
=== Participations: (5–6) ===
Group membership World Group (0–0) WG play-off (0–0) Group I (0–0) Group II (2–6) Group III (3–0) Group IV (0–0)	Matches by surface Hard (4–6) Clay (1–0) Grass (0–0) Carpet (0–0)	Matches by type Singles (0–3) Doubles (5–3)

- ▲ ▼ indicates the outcome of the Davis Cup match followed by the score, date, place of event, the zonal classification and its phase, and the court surface.

Rubber outcome	No.	Rubber	Match type (partner if any)	Opponent nation	Opponent player(s)	Score
▲3–0; 17 July 2015; City of San Marino, San Marino; Europe Zone Group III round robin; clay surface
Victory	1	III	Doubles (with Kenneth Raisma) (dead rubber)	Montenegro	Rrezart Cungu / Ivan Saveljić	6–1, 6–2
▲3–0; 3 March 2016; Tere Tennis Centre, Tallinn, Europe Zone Group III round robin; hard (indoor) surface
Victory	2	III	Doubles (with Jürgen Zopp) (dead rubber)	Kosovo	Granit Bajraliu / Gurash Hasani	6–1, 6–1
▲3–0; 4 March 2016; Tere Tennis Centre, Tallinn, Estonia; Europe Zone Group III round robin; hard (indoor) surface
Victory	3	III	Doubles (with Jürgen Zopp) (dead rubber)	Greece	Christos Antonopoulos / Vasileios Iliopoulos	6–0, 6–1
▼1–4; 3-5 February 2017; Irene Country Club, Centurion, South Africa; Europe/Africa Zone Group II first round; hard surface
Defeat	4	III	Doubles (with Kenneth Raisma)	South Africa	Raven Klaasen / Ruan Roelofse	7–6^{(7–4)}, 3–6, 4–6, 5–7
Defeat	5	IV	Singles (dead rubber)	South Africa	Lloyd Harris	5–7, 3–6
▲3–2; 7-9 April 2017; Tere Tennis Centre, Tallinn, Estonia; Europe/Africa Zone Group II relegation play-off; hard (indoor) surface
Victory	6	III	Doubles (with Kenneth Raisma)	Monaco	Romain Arneodo / Benjamin Balleret	4–6, 6–1, 6–2, 7–6^{(9–7)}
Defeat	7	IV	Singles (dead rubber)	Monaco	Lucas Catarina	4–6, 6–4, 6–7^{(3–7)}
▼1–3; 3-4 February 2018; Šiauliai Tennis School, Šiauliai, Lithuania; Europe/Africa Zone Group II first round; hard (indoor) surface
Defeat	8	III	Doubles (with Kenneth Raisma)	Lithuania	Ričardas Berankis / Laurynas Grigelis	6–2, 4–6, 6–7^{(4–7)}
▲2–1; 6-7 March 2020; Alex Metreveli Tennis Club, Tbilisi, Georgia; World Group II playoff first round; hard surface
Victory	9	III	Doubles (with Vladimir Ivanov)	(Georgia (country)) Georgia	Aleksandre Metreveli / George Tsivadze	3–6, 6–3, 6–3
▼0–2; 17-18 September 2021; Jan Group Arena, Biel, Switzerland; World Group II first round; hard (indoor) surface
Defeat	10	II	Singles	Switzerland	Henri Laaksonen	4–6, 0–6
Defeat	11	III	Doubles (with Vladimir Ivanov)	Switzerland	Marc-Andrea Hüsler / Dominic Stricker	4–6, 6–7^{(4–7)}
