= 2016 Davis Cup Europe Zone Group III =

International tennis competition

The Europe Zone was one of the four zones within Group 3 of the regional Davis Cup competition in 2016. The zone's competition was held in round robin format in Tallinn, Estonia, in March 2016. Estonia and Cyprus won promotion to Group II, Europe/Africa Zone, for 2017.

== Participating nations ==
- Albania
- Andorra
- Armenia
- Cyprus
- Estonia
- Greece
- Iceland
- Ireland
- Kosovo
- Liechtenstein
- Macedonia
- Malta
- Moldova
- Montenegro
- San Marino

=== Inactive nations ===
- Azerbaijan

== Draw ==
Date: 2–5 March 2016

Location: Tere Tennis Centre, Tallinn, Estonia (indoor hard)

Format: Round-robin basis. Four pools of four teams (Pools A, B, C and D). The winners of each pool play-off against each other to determine which two nations are promoted to Europe/Africa Zone Group II in 2017.

Seeding: The seeding was based on the Davis Cup Rankings of 30 November 2015 (shown in parentheses below).

Pot A	Pot B	Pot C	Pot D
1. Moldova (52); 2. Ireland (64); 3. Cyprus (69); 4. Estonia (72)	5. Macedonia (84); 6. Montenegro (91); 7. Malta (95); 8. Greece (100)	9. Liechtenstein (107); 10. San Marino (109); 11. Armenia (117); 12. Iceland (118)	13. Albania (124); 14. Andorra (126); 15. Kosovo (–)

Groups:

Group A

	Moldova	Malta	San Marino	RR W–L	Matches W–L	Sets W–L	Games W–L	Standings
Moldova		3–0	3–0	2–0	6–0	12–0	72–18	1
Malta	0–3		2–1	1–1	2–4	4–8	47–55	2
San Marino	0–3	1–2		0–2	1–5	2–10	26–72	3

Group B

	Ireland	Macedonia	Armenia	Albania	RR W–L	Matches W–L	Sets W–L	Games W–L	Standings
Ireland		2–1	3–0	3–0	3–0	8–1	17–2	108–39	1
Macedonia	1–2		3–0	3–0	2–1	7–2	14–5	100–61	2
Armenia	0–3	0–3		2–1	1–2	2–7	5–14	58–94	3
Albania	0–3	0–3	1–2		0–3	1–8	2–17	36–108	4

Group C

	Cyprus	Montenegro	Andorra	Iceland	RR W–L	Matches W–L	Sets W–L	Games W–L	Standings
Cyprus		3–0	3–0	2–1	3–0	8–1	17–3	115–52	1
Montenegro	0–3		2–1	2–1	2–1	4–5	8–12	89–100	2
Andorra	0–3	1–2		2–1	1–2	3–6	9–12	86–106	3
Iceland	1–2	1–2	1–2		0–3	3–6	6–13	67–99	4

Group D

	Estonia	Greece	Liechtenstein	Kosovo	RR W–L	Matches W–L	Sets W–L	Games W–L	Standings
Estonia		3–0	3–0	3–0	3–0	9–0	18–0	109–18	1
Greece	0–3		3–0	3–0	2–1	6–3	12–6	75–63	2
Liechtenstein	0–3	0–3		3–0	1–2	3–6	6–12	62–85	3
Kosovo	0–3	0–3	0–3		0–3	0–9	0–18	28–108	4

== First round ==
=== Group A ===
==== Moldova vs. San Marino ====
Moldova
3
Tere Tennis Centre, Tallinn, Estonia
2 March 2016
Hard (i)

San Marino
0

			1	2	3
1	(Moldova) (San Marino)	Alexander Cozbinov; Pietro Grassi	6; 0	6; 0
2	(Moldova) (San Marino)	Radu Albot; Marco De Rossi	6; 0	6; 2
3	(Moldova) (San Marino)	Radu Albot / Andrei Ciumac; Marco De Rossi / Pietro Grassi	6; 4	6; 1

==== Malta vs. San Marino ====
Malta
2
Tere Tennis Centre, Tallinn, Estonia
3 March 2016
Hard (i)

San Marino
1

			1	2	3
1	(Malta) (San Marino)	Matthew Asciak; Pietro Grassi	6; 1	6; 1
2	(Malta) (San Marino)	Bernard Cassar Torregiani; Marco De Rossi	6^{2} 7^{7}	6^{3} 7^{7}
3	(Malta) (San Marino)	Matthew Asciak / Bernard Cassar Torregiani; Marco De Rossi / Pietro Grassi	6; 2	6; 1

==== Moldova vs. Malta ====
Moldova
3
Tere Tennis Centre, Tallinn, Estonia
4 March 2016
Hard (i)

Malta
0

			1	2	3
1	(Moldova) (Malta)	Andrei Șoltoianu; Bradley Callus	6; 2	6; 3
2	(Moldova) (Malta)	Radu Albot; Bernard Cassar Torregiani	6; 0	6; 1
3	(Moldova) (Malta)	Radu Albot / Andrei Ciumac; Bradley Callus / Matthew Cassar Torregiani	6; 3	6; 2

=== Group B ===
==== Ireland vs. Albania ====
Ireland
3
Tere Tennis Centre, Tallinn, Estonia
2 March 2016
Hard (i)

Albania
0

			1	2	3
1	(Republic of Ireland) (Albania)	Peter Bothwell; Arber Sulstarova	6; 0	6; 0
2	(Republic of Ireland) (Albania)	Sam Barry; Flavio Deçe	6; 1	6; 3
3	(Republic of Ireland) (Albania)	Sam Barry / David O'Hare; Flavio Deçe / Genajd Shypheja	6; 0	6; 0

==== Macedonia vs. Armenia ====
North Macedonia
3
Tere Tennis Centre, Tallinn, Estonia
2 March 2016
Hard (i)

Armenia
0

			1	2	3
1	(North Macedonia) (Armenia)	Dimitar Grabul; Mikayel Khachatryan	6; 4	6; 0
2	(North Macedonia) (Armenia)	Tomislav Jotovski; Mikayel Avetisyan	6; 4	6; 2
3	(North Macedonia) (Armenia)	Dimitar Grabul / Tomislav Jotovski; Mikayel Avetisyan / Henrik Nikoghosyan	6; 1	6; 4

==== Ireland vs. Armenia ====
Ireland
3
Tere Tennis Centre, Tallinn, Estonia
3 March 2016
Hard (i)

Armenia
0

			1	2	3
1	(Republic of Ireland) (Armenia)	Bjorn Thomson; Sedrak Khachatryan	6; 2	6; 2
2	(Republic of Ireland) (Armenia)	Sam Barry; Mikayel Avetisyan	6; 1	6; 0
3	(Republic of Ireland) (Armenia)	Sam Barry / David O'Hare; Mikayel Avetisyan / Mikayel Khachatryan	6; 1	6; 2

==== Macedonia vs. Albania ====
North Macedonia
3
Tere Tennis Centre, Tallinn, Estonia
3 March 2016
Hard (i)

Albania
0

			1	2	3
1	(North Macedonia) (Albania)	Dimitar Grabul; Flavio Deçe	7^{7} 6^{3}	6; 1
2	(North Macedonia) (Albania)	Tomislav Jotovski; Genajd Shypheja	6; 0	6; 0
3	(North Macedonia) (Albania)	Tomislav Jotovski / Gorazd Srbljak; Genajd Shypheja / Arber Sulstarova	6; 0	6; 3

==== Ireland vs. Macedonia ====
Ireland
2
Tere Tennis Centre, Tallinn, Estonia
4 March 2016
Hard (i)

North Macedonia
1

			1	2	3
1	(Republic of Ireland) (North Macedonia)	Bjorn Thomson; Dimitar Grabul	6; 3	3; 6	3; 6
2	(Republic of Ireland) (North Macedonia)	Sam Barry; Tomislav Jotovski	6; 3	6; 4
3	(Republic of Ireland) (North Macedonia)	Sam Barry / David O'Hare; Dimitar Grabul / Tomislav Jotovski	6; 3	6; 2

==== Armenia vs. Albania ====
Armenia
2
Tere Tennis Centre, Tallinn, Estonia
4 March 2016
Hard (i)

Albania
1

			1	2	3
1	(Armenia) (Albania)	Mikayel Khachatryan; Arber Sulstarova	6; 3	6; 0
2	(Armenia) (Albania)	Mikayel Avetisyan; Flavio Deçe	6; 3	3; 6	2; 6
3	(Armenia) (Albania)	Mikayel Avetisyan / Mikayel Khachatryan; Flavio Deçe / Genajd Shypheja	6; 2	6; 2

=== Group C ===
==== Cyprus vs. Iceland ====
Cyprus
2
Tere Tennis Centre, Tallinn, Estonia
2 March 2016
Hard (i)

Iceland
1

			1	2	3
1	(Cyprus) (Iceland)	Petros Chrysochos; Rafn Kumar Bonifacius	6; 0	6; 2
2	(Cyprus) (Iceland)	Marcos Baghdatis; Birkir Gunnarsson	6; 4	6; 0
3	(Cyprus) (Iceland)	Constandinos Christoforou / Soteris Hadjistyllis; Rafn Kumar Bonifacius / Birkir Gunnarsson	3; 6	6; 4	4; 6

==== Montenegro vs. Andorra ====
Montenegro
2
Tere Tennis Centre, Tallinn, Estonia
2 March 2016
Hard (i)

Andorra
1

			1	2	3
1	(Montenegro) (Andorra)	Rrezart Cungu; Jean-Baptiste Poux-Gautier	3; 6	5; 7
2	(Montenegro) (Andorra)	Ljubomir Čelebić; Laurent Recouderc	6; 4	5; 7	6; 4
3	(Montenegro) (Andorra)	Ljubomir Čelebić / Pavle Rogan; Jean-Baptiste Poux-Gautier / Laurent Recouderc	6; 2	5; 7	6; 4

==== Montenegro vs. Iceland ====
Montenegro
2
Tere Tennis Centre, Tallinn, Estonia
3 March 2016
Hard (i)

Iceland
1

			1	2	3
1	(Montenegro) (Iceland)	Rrezart Cungu; Rafn Kumar Bonifacius	4; 6	4; 6
2	(Montenegro) (Iceland)	Ljubomir Čelebić; Birkir Gunnarsson	6; 2	6; 2
3	(Montenegro) (Iceland)	Ljubomir Čelebić / Pavle Rogan; Rafn Kumar Bonifacius / Birkir Gunnarsson	6; 3	6; 3

==== Cyprus vs. Andorra ====
Cyprus
3
Tere Tennis Centre, Tallinn, Estonia
3 March 2016
Hard (i)

Andorra
0

			1	2	3
1	(Cyprus) (Andorra)	Petros Chrysochos; Eric Cervos Noguer	6; 0	6; 0
2	(Cyprus) (Andorra)	Marcos Baghdatis; Jean-Baptiste Poux-Gautier	6; 2	6; 0
3	(Cyprus) (Andorra)	Constandinos Christoforou / Soteris Hadjistyllis; Jean-Baptiste Poux-Gautier / Laurent Recouderc	4; 6	7^{7} 6^{1}	6; 1

==== Andorra vs. Iceland ====
Andorra
2
Tere Tennis Centre, Tallinn, Estonia
4 March 2016
Hard (i)

Iceland
1

			1	2	3
1	(Andorra) (Iceland)	Eric Cervos Noguer; Rafn Kumar Bonifacius	2; 6	4; 6
2	(Andorra) (Iceland)	Laurent Recouderc; Birkir Gunnarsson	6; 3	6; 1
3	(Andorra) (Iceland)	Jean-Baptiste Poux-Gautier / Laurent Recouderc; Rafn Kumar Bonifacius / Birkir Gunnarsson	6; 3	6; 4

==== Cyprus vs. Montenegro ====
Cyprus
3
Tere Tennis Centre, Tallinn, Estonia
4 March 2016
Hard (i)

Montenegro
0

			1	2	3
1	(Cyprus) (Montenegro)	Petros Chrysochos; Pavle Rogan	6; 0	6; 0
2	(Cyprus) (Montenegro)	Marcos Baghdatis; Ljubomir Čelebić	6; 4	7^{7} 6^{4}
3	(Cyprus) (Montenegro)	Constandinos Christoforou / Soteris Hadjistyllis; Matija Bulatovic / Rrezart Cungu	6; 2	6; 3

=== Group D ===
==== Greece vs. Kosovo ====
Greece
3
Tere Tennis Centre, Tallinn, Estonia
2 March 2016
Hard (i)

Kosovo
0

			1	2	3
1	(Greece) (Kosovo)	Christos Antonopoulos; Granit Bajraliu	6; 2	6; 2
2	(Greece) (Kosovo)	Ioannis Stergiou; Hyda Banjska	6; 4	6; 0
3	(Greece) (Kosovo)	Christos Antonopoulos / Vasileios Iliopoulos; Gurash Hasani / Meldin Mustafi	6; 2	6; 1

==== Estonia vs. Liechtenstein ====
Estonia
3
Tere Tennis Centre, Tallinn, Estonia
2 March 2016
Hard (i)

Liechtenstein
0

			1	2	3
1	(Estonia) (Liechtenstein)	Kenneth Raisma; Gian-Carlo Besimo	6; 1	6; 3
2	(Estonia) (Liechtenstein)	Jürgen Zopp; Vital Flurin Leuch	6; 0	6; 0
3	(Estonia) (Liechtenstein)	Kenneth Raisma / Jürgen Zopp; Robin Forster / Timo Kranz	6; 0	7^{7} 6^{2}

==== Greece vs. Liechtenstein ====
Greece
3
Tere Tennis Centre, Tallinn, Estonia
3 March 2016
Hard (i)

Liechtenstein
0

			1	2	3
1	(Greece) (Liechtenstein)	Christos Antonopoulos; Robin Forster	6; 3	6; 4
2	(Greece) (Liechtenstein)	Ioannis Stergiou; Timo Kranz	6; 1	6; 2
3	(Greece) (Liechtenstein)	Christos Antonopoulos / Vasileios Iliopoulos; Gian-Carlo Besimo / Vital Flurin Leuch	6; 3	6; 3

==== Estonia vs. Kosovo ====
Estonia
3
Tere Tennis Centre, Tallinn, Estonia
3 March 2016
Hard (i)

Kosovo
0

			1	2	3
1	(Estonia) (Kosovo)	Vladimir Ivanov; Granit Bajraliu	6; 0	6; 2
2	(Estonia) (Kosovo)	Jürgen Zopp; Hyda Banjska	6; 0	6; 1
3	(Estonia) (Kosovo)	Mattias Siimar / Jürgen Zopp; Granit Bajraliu / Gurash Hasani	6; 1	6; 1

==== Estonia vs. Greece ====
Estonia
3
Tere Tennis Centre, Tallinn, Estonia
4 March 2016
Hard (i)

Greece
0

			1	2	3
1	(Estonia) (Greece)	Kenneth Raisma; Christos Antonopoulos	6; 1	6; 0
2	(Estonia) (Greece)	Jürgen Zopp; Ioannis Stergiou	6; 0	6; 1
3	(Estonia) (Greece)	Mattias Siimar / Jürgen Zopp; Christos Antonopoulos / Vasileios Iliopoulos	6; 0	6; 1

==== Kosovo vs. Liechtenstein ====
Kosovo
0
Tere Tennis Centre, Tallinn, Estonia
4 March 2016
Hard (i)

Liechtenstein
3

			1	2	3
1	(Kosovo) (Liechtenstein)	Granit Bajraliu; Robin Forster	3; 6	4; 6
2	(Kosovo) (Liechtenstein)	Hyda Banjska; Vital Flurin Leuch	1; 6	0; 6
3	(Kosovo) (Liechtenstein)	Gurash Hasani / Meldin Mustafi; Timo Kranz / Vital Flurin Leuch	3; 6	1; 6

== Play-offs ==
Placing	A Team	Score	D Team
Promotional	Moldova	0–2	Estonia
5th–8th	Malta	1–2	Greece
9th–12th	San Marino	1–2	Liechtenstein
13th–15th	N/A	—	Kosovo

Placing	B Team	Score	C Team
Promotional	Ireland	0–2	Cyprus
5th–8th	Macedonia	2–0	Montenegro
9th–12th	Armenia	1–2	Andorra
13th–15th	Albania	0–3	Iceland

=== Promotional ===
==== Moldova vs. Estonia ====
Moldova
0
Tere Tennis Centre, Tallinn, Estonia
5 March 2016
Hard (i)

Estonia
2

			1	2	3
1	(Moldova) (Estonia)	Alexander Cozbinov; Kenneth Raisma	2; 6	4; 6
2	(Moldova) (Estonia)	Radu Albot; Jürgen Zopp	2; 6	2; 6
3	(Moldova) (Estonia)	Radu Albot / Andrei Ciumac; Mattias Siimar / Jürgen Zopp				not played

==== Ireland vs. Cyprus ====
Ireland
0
Tere Tennis Centre, Tallinn, Estonia
5 March 2016
Hard (i)

Cyprus
2

			1	2	3
1	(Republic of Ireland) (Cyprus)	Peter Bothwell; Petros Chrysochos	1; 6	6; 2	0; 6
2	(Republic of Ireland) (Cyprus)	Sam Barry; Marcos Baghdatis	4; 6	6^{4} 7^{7}
3	(Republic of Ireland) (Cyprus)	Sam Barry / David O'Hare; Marcos Baghdatis / Petros Chrysochos				not played

=== 5th–8th ===
==== Malta vs. Greece ====
Malta
1
Tere Tennis Centre, Tallinn, Estonia
5 March 2016
Hard (i)

Greece
2

			1	2	3
1	(Malta) (Greece)	Matthew Asciak; Vasileios Iliopoulos	6; 2	6; 1
2	(Malta) (Greece)	Bernard Cassar Torregiani; Ioannis Stergiou	2; 6	6; 3	0; 6
3	(Malta) (Greece)	Matthew Asciak / Bernard Cassar Torregiani; Christos Antonopoulos / Vasileios Iliopoulos	5; 7	4; 6

==== Macedonia vs. Montenegro ====
North Macedonia
2
Tere Tennis Centre, Tallinn, Estonia
5 March 2016
Hard (i)

Montenegro
0

			1	2	3
1	(North Macedonia) (Montenegro)	Gorazd Srbljak; Matija Bulatovic	6; 1	6; 2
2	(North Macedonia) (Montenegro)	Dimitar Grabul; Rrezart Cungu	6; 2	6; 0
3	(North Macedonia) (Montenegro)	Dimitar Grabul / Tomislav Jotovski; Rrezart Cungu / Pavle Rogan				not played

=== 9th–12th ===
==== San Marino vs. Liechtenstein ====
San Marino
1
Tere Tennis Centre, Tallinn, Estonia
5 March 2016
Hard (i)

Liechtenstein
2

			1	2	3
1	(San Marino) (Liechtenstein)	Pietro Grassi; Timo Kranz	1; 6	6; 3	3; 6
2	(San Marino) (Liechtenstein)	Marco De Rossi; Vital Flurin Leuch	6; 2	7; 5
3	(San Marino) (Liechtenstein)	Marco De Rossi / Pietro Grassi; Robin Forster / Timo Kranz	2; 6	3; 6

==== Armenia vs. Andorra ====
Armenia
1
Tere Tennis Centre, Tallinn, Estonia
5 March 2016
Hard (i)

Andorra
2

			1	2	3
1	(Armenia) (Andorra)	Mikayel Khachatryan; Jean-Baptiste Poux-Gautier	3; 6	3; 6
2	(Armenia) (Andorra)	Sedrak Khachatryan; Laurent Recouderc	2; 6	3; 6
3	(Armenia) (Andorra)	Sedrak Khachatryan / Henrik Nikoghosyan; Eric Cervos Noguer / Genajd Shypheja	2; 6	6; 3	6; 4

=== 13th–15th ===
==== Albania vs. Iceland ====
Albania
0
Tere Tennis Centre, Tallinn, Estonia
5 March 2016
Hard (i)

Iceland
3

			1	2	3
1	(Albania) (Iceland)	Mario Zili; Rafn Kumar Bonifacius	1; 6	0; 6
2	(Albania) (Iceland)	Flavio Deçe; Birkir Gunnarsson	2; 6	3; 6
3	(Albania) (Iceland)	Genajd Shypheja / Arber Sulstarova; Birkir Gunnarsson / Vladimir Ristic	1; 6	4; 6
