= 2015 US Open – Boys' singles =

Boys' singles
- 2015 US Open

Final
- Champion: (United States) Taylor Harry Fritz
- Runner-up: (United States) Tommy Paul
- Score: 6–2, 6–7^{(4–7)}, 6–2

Events
| Singles | men | women | | boys | girls |
| Doubles | men | women | mixed | boys | girls |
| WC Singles | men | women | quad |
| WC Doubles | men | women | quad |
| Legends | men | women | mixed |
- US Open

Omar Jasika was the defending champion, but he chose not to participate. Taylor Harry Fritz won the title, defeating Tommy Paul in the final, 6–2, 6–7^{(4–7)}, 6–2.

== Seeds ==
1. (United States) Taylor Harry Fritz (champion)
2. (United States) Michael Mmoh (quarterfinals)
3. (Sweden) Mikael Ymer (quarterfinals)
4. (South Korea) Hong Seong-chan (quarterfinals)
5. (United States) Tommy Paul (final)
6. (United States) Reilly Opelka (third round)
7. (Brazil) Orlando Luz (second round)
8. (Chile) Marcelo Tomás Barrios Vera (first round)
9. (United States) William Blumberg (third round)
10. (France) Corentin Denolly (third round)
11. (South Korea) Chung Yun-seong (semifinals)
12. (Vietnam) Lý Hoàng Nam (first round)
13. (South Africa) Lloyd Harris (third round)
14. (Japan) Akira Santillan (third round)
15. (Norway) Casper Ruud (third round)
16. (Greece) Stefanos Tsitsipas (third round)

== Main draw ==
Key

- Q = Qualifier
- WC = Wild card
- LL = Lucky loser
- Alt = Alternate
- ITF = ITF entry
- PR = Protected ranking
- SR = Special ranking
- SE = Special exempt
- JE = Junior exempt
- JR = Junior Accelerator Programme entrant
- CO = College Accelerator Programme entrant
- NG = Next Gen Accelerator Program entrant
- w/o = Walkover
- r = Retired
- d = Defaulted

=== Finals ===
Quarterfinals
1 | (United States) Taylor Harry Fritz | 6 | 6
WC | (United States) Alex Rybakov | 3 | 0
3 | (Sweden) Mikael Ymer | 6 | 6^{2} | 3
11 | (South Korea) Chung Yun-seong | 2 | 7^{7} | 6
5 | (United States) Tommy Paul | 2 | 7 | 6
4 | (South Korea) Hong Seong-chan | 6 | 5 | 1
Q | (Australia) Alex De Minaur | 1 | 6 | 6
2 | (United States) Michael Mmoh | 6 | 3 | 4

Semifinals
1 | (United States) Taylor Harry Fritz | 6 | 6
11 | (South Korea) Chung Yun-seong | 2 | 3
5 | (United States) Tommy Paul | 6 | 6
Q | (Australia) Alex De Minaur | 0 | 0

Final
1 | (United States) Taylor Harry Fritz | 6 | 6^{4} | 6
5 | (United States) Tommy Paul | 2 | 7^{7} | 2

=== Top half ===
==== Section 1 ====
First round
1 | (United States) Taylor Harry Fritz | 6 | 6
(France) Ugo Humbert | 4 | 2
(Japan) Yusuke Takahashi | 6 | 6
(Argentina) Gerónimo Espín Busleiman | 4 | 1
(Spain) Bernabé Zapata Miralles | 7^{7} | 6
(Russia) Denis Klok | 6^{2} | 3
(Italy) Federico Bonacia | 1 | 4
16 | (Greece) Stefanos Tsitsipas | 6 | 6
12 | (Vietnam) Lý Hoàng Nam | 3 | 4
Q | (Canada) Denis Shapovalov | 6 | 6
Q | (Denmark) Benjamin Hannestad | 3 | 5
(United States) Ulises Blanch | 6 | 7
WC | (United States) Alex Rybakov | 6 | 6
(Portugal) Felipe Cunha e Silva | 4 | 4
(Germany) Tim Sandkaulen | 1 | 1
7 | (Brazil) Orlando Luz | 6 | 6

Second round
1 | (United States) TH Fritz | 6 | 6
(Japan) Y Takahashi | 3 | 4
(Spain) B Zapata Miralles | 2 | 4
16 | (Greece) S Tsitsipas | 6 | 6
Q | (Canada) D Shapovalov | 6 | 6
(United States) U Blanch | 2 | 2
WC | (United States) A Rybakov | 6 | 6
7 | (Brazil) O Luz | 3 | 0

Third round
1 | (United States) TH Fritz | 7 | 6
16 | (Greece) S Tsitsipas | 5 | 1
Q | (Canada) D Shapovalov | 0 | 6^{6}
WC | (United States) A Rybakov | 6 | 7^{8}

Quarterfinals
1 | (United States) TH Fritz | 6 | 6
WC | (United States) A Rybakov | 3 | 0

==== Section 2 ====
First round
3 | (Sweden) Mikael Ymer | 6 | 4 | 6
WC | (United States) Vasil Kirkov | 3 | 6 | 3
(Switzerland) Marko Osmakcic | 4 | 6^{4}
(Serbia) Miomir Kecmanović | 6 | 7^{7}
(France) Geoffrey Blancaneaux | 5 | 4
WC | (United States) Patrick Kypson | 7 | 6
Q | (Germany) Nicola Kuhn | 4 | 3
15 | (Norway) Casper Ruud | 6 | 6
11 | (South Korea) Chung Yun-seong | 6 | 6
WC | (United States) Gianni Ross | 4 | 4
(Czech Republic) Patrik Rikl | 7^{8} | 6
(Australia) Jake Delaney | 6^{6} | 4
(Japan) Yosuke Watanuki | 6 | 6
(Argentina) Manuel Peña López | 3 | 3
(Canada) Alejandro Tabilo | 1 | 4
6 | (United States) Reilly Opelka | 6 | 6

Second round
3 | (Sweden) M Ymer | 6 | 6
(Serbia) M Kecmanović | 4 | 3
WC | (United States) P Kypson | 0 | 0^{r}
15 | (Norway) C Ruud | 6 | 3
11 | (South Korea) Y-s Chung | 7 | 6
(Czech Republic) P Rikl | 5 | 4
(Japan) Y Watanuki | 4 | 1
6 | (United States) R Opelka | 6 | 6

Third round
3 | (Sweden) M Ymer | 6^{4} | 6 | 6
15 | (Norway) C Ruud | 7^{7} | 1 | 2
11 | (South Korea) Y-s Chung | 6 | 7^{7}
6 | (United States) R Opelka | 4 | 6^{2}

Quarterfinals
3 | (Sweden) M Ymer | 6 | 6^{2} | 3
11 | (South Korea) Y Chung | 2 | 7^{7} | 6

=== Bottom half ===
==== Section 3 ====
First round
5 | (United States) Tommy Paul | 6 | 6
Q | (Estonia) Mattias Siimar | 4 | 3
(Canada) Félix Auger-Aliassime | 6 | 6
Q | (Chinese Taipei) Wu Tung-lin | 2 | 4
(United States) Nathan Ponwith | 4 | 6 | 3
(Portugal) Nuno Borges | 6 | 3 | 6
(Finland) Patrik Niklas-Salminen | 6 | 5 | 4
10 | (France) Corentin Denolly | 3 | 7 | 6
13 | (South Africa) Lloyd Harris | 6 | 6^{2} | 6
WC | (United States) Sam Riffice | 3 | 7^{7} | 4
(Switzerland) Johan Nikles | 1 | 4
(Japan) Sora Fukuda | 6 | 6
(Italy) Andrea Pellegrino | 6 | 4 | 6
WC | (United States) Eduardo Nava | 3 | 6 | 4
(Argentina) Juan Pablo Ficovich | 1 | 3
4 | (South Korea) Hong Seong-chan | 6 | 6

Second round
5 | (United States) T Paul | 4 | 6 | 7
(Canada) F Auger-Aliassime | 6 | 4 | 5
(Portugal) N Borges | 4 | 4
10 | (France) C Denolly | 6 | 6
13 | (South Africa) L Harris | 6 | 6
(Japan) S Fukuda | 4 | 4
(Italy) A Pellegrino | 3 | 1
4 | (South Korea) S-c Hong | 6 | 6

Third round
5 | (United States) T Paul | 6 | 6
10 | (France) C Denolly | 3 | 1
13 | (South Africa) L Harris | 3 | 4
4 | (South Korea) S-c Hong | 6 | 6

Quarterfinals
5 | (United States) T Paul | 2 | 7 | 6
4 | (South Korea) S-c Hong | 6 | 5 | 1

==== Section 4 ====
First round
8 | (Chile) Marcelo Tomás Barrios Vera | 6 | 4 | 3
(Japan) Jumpei Yamasaki | 2 | 6 | 6
Q | (Australia) Alex De Minaur | 6 | 6
WC | (United States) Alexandre Rotsaert | 4 | 4
(Hungary) Máté Valkusz | 6^{5} | 1^{r}
Q | (United States) J. J. Wolf | 7^{7} | 3
(Slovakia) Lukáš Klein | 6^{2} | 1
9 | (United States) William Blumberg | 7^{7} | 6
14 | (Japan) Akira Santillan | 6 | 7^{7}
(Uzbekistan) Jurabek Karimov | 1 | 6^{4}
(Argentina) Franco Capalbo | 6^{2} | 0
(South Korea) Oh Chan-yeong | 7^{7} | 6
Q | (Egypt) Youssef Hossam | 4 | 7^{11} | 1
(Germany) Louis Wessels | 6 | 6^{9} | 6
WC | (France) Evan Furness | 2 | 4
2 | (United States) Michael Mmoh | 6 | 6

Second round
(Japan) J Yamasaki | 1 | 6^{4}
Q | (Australia) A De Minaur | 6 | 7^{7}
Q | (United States) J. J. Wolf | 6 | 4 | 1
9 | (United States) W Blumberg | 3 | 6 | 6
14 | (Japan) A Santillan | 6 | 6
(South Korea) C-y Oh | 3 | 1
(Germany) L Wessels | 3 | 1
2 | (United States) M Mmoh | 6 | 6

Third round
Q | (Australia) A De Minaur | 7 | 3 | 6
9 | (United States) W Blumberg | 5 | 6 | 3
14 | (Japan) A Santillan | 4 | 2
2 | (United States) M Mmoh | 6 | 6

Quarterfinals
Q | (Australia) A De Minaur | 1 | 6 | 6
2 | (United States) M Mmoh | 6 | 3 | 4

== Qualifying ==
=== Seeds ===
1. (Philippines) Alberto Lim (first round)
2. (China) Wu Yibing (qualifying competition)
3. (Canada) Denis Shapovalov (qualified)
4. (Estonia) Mattias Siimar (qualified)
5. (Denmark) Benjamin Hannestad (qualified)
6. (Australia) Alex de Minaur (qualified)
7. (Chinese Taipei) Wu Tung-lin (qualified)
8. (Brazil) Igor Marcondes (first round)
9. (Bulgaria) Alexandar Lazarov (first round)
10. (Japan) Renta Tokuda (qualifying competition)
11. (Russia) Artem Dubrivnyy (qualifying competition)
12. (Egypt) Youssef Hossam (qualified)
13. (Italy) Corrado Summaria (first round)
14. (United States) Emil Reinberg (qualifying competition)
15. (Russia) Naoto Kazakov (first round)
16. (Russia) Alexey Aleshchev (qualifying competition)

=== Qualifiers ===
1. (Egypt) Youssef Hossam
2. (United States) J. J. Wolf
3. (Canada) Denis Shapovalov
4. (Estonia) Mattias Siimar
5. (Denmark) Benjamin Hannestad
6. (Australia) Alex de Minaur
7. (Chinese Taipei) Wu Tung-lin
8. (Germany) Nicola Kuhn

=== Draw ===
==== First qualifier ====
First round
1 | (Philippines) Alberto Lim | 6 | 3 | 4
(Republic of Ireland) Bjorn Thomson | 0 | 6 | 6
WC | (United States) Jake van Emburgh | 2 | 6 | 4
12 | (Egypt) Youssef Hossam | 6 | 3 | 6

Qualifying competition
(Republic of Ireland) Bjorn Thomson | 1 | 1
12 | (Egypt) Youssef Hossam | 6 | 6

==== Second qualifier ====
First round
2 | (China) Wu Yibing | 6 | 6
(Japan) Yuya Ito | 4 | 4
WC | (United States) J. J. Wolf | 6 | 4
13 | (Italy) Corrado Summaria | 1 | 0^{r}

Qualifying competition
2 | (China) Wu Yibing | 4 | 3
WC | (United States) J. J. Wolf | 6 | 6

==== Third qualifier ====
First round
3 | (Canada) Denis Shapovalov | 7^{7} | 6
(United States) Hady Habib | 6^{2} | 2
(Brazil) Gabriel Roveri Sidney | 4 | 3
11 | (Russia) Artem Dubrivnyy | 6 | 6

Qualifying competition
3 | (Canada) Denis Shapovalov | 6 | 6
11 | (Russia) Artem Dubrivnyy | 2 | 3

==== Fourth qualifier ====
First round
4 | (Estonia) Mattias Siimar | 6 | 6
(United States) Sameer Kumar | 4 | 3
(United States) Liam Caruana | 4 | 5
10 | (Japan) Renta Tokuda | 6 | 7

Qualifying competition
4 | (Estonia) Mattias Siimar | 6 | 6
10 | (Japan) Renta Tokuda | 3 | 2

==== Fifth qualifier ====
First round
5 | (Denmark) Benjamin Hannestad | 6 | 2 | 6
WC | (United States) Trent Bryde | 4 | 6 | 0
(United States) Catalin Mateas | 1^{r}
16 | (Russia) Alexey Aleshchev | 4

Qualifying competition
5 | (Denmark) Benjamin Hannestad | 7 | 5 | 6
16 | (Russia) Alexey Aleshchev | 5 | 7 | 2

==== Sixth qualifier ====
First round
6 | (Australia) Alex de Minaur | 6 | 6
WC | (Japan) Yuki Mochizuki | 1 | 4
(Canada) Benjamin Sigouin | 3 | 6 | 4
14 | (United States) Emil Reinberg | 6 | 2 | 6

Qualifying competition
6 | (Australia) Alex de Minaur | 6 | 6
14 | (United States) Emil Reinberg | 4 | 2

==== Seventh qualifier ====
First round
7 | (Chinese Taipei) Wu Tung-lin | 6 | 6
WC | (United States) John McNally | 3 | 3
(Japan) Naoto Kai | 6 | 4 | 6
15 | (Russia) Naoto Kazakov | 4 | 6 | 2

Qualifying competition
7 | (Chinese Taipei) Wu Tung-lin | 6 | 6
(Japan) Naoto Kai | 4 | 3

==== Eighth qualifier ====
First round
8 | (Brazil) Igor Marcondes | 3 | 7^{9} | 1
(Germany) Nicola Kuhn | 6 | 6^{7} | 6
WC | (United States) Ezekiel Clark | 2 | 6 | 4
9 | (Bulgaria) Alexandar Lazarov | 6 | 4 | 1^{r}

Qualifying competition
(Germany) Nicola Kuhn | 6 | 6
WC | (United States) Ezekiel Clark | 4 | 1
