= 2015 US Open – Mixed doubles =

Mixed doubles
- 2015 US Open

Final
- Champions: (Switzerland) Martina Hingis (India) Leander Paes
- Runners-up: (United States) Bethanie Mattek-Sands (United States) Sam Querrey
- Score: 6–4, 3–6, [10–7]

Details
- Draw: 32
- Seeds: 8

Events
Singles	men	women		boys	girls
Doubles	men	women	mixed	boys	girls
WC Singles	men	women	quad
WC Doubles	men	women	quad
Legends	men	women	mixed
- US Open

Sania Mirza and Bruno Soares were the defending champions but lost in the first round to Andrea Hlaváčková and Łukasz Kubot.

Martina Hingis and Leander Paes won the title, defeating Bethanie Mattek-Sands and Sam Querrey in the final, 6–4, 3–6, [10–7]. Hingis and Paes became the first team in more than 40 years to win three of the four mixed doubles titles in one year.

== Seeds ==
1. (India) Sania Mirza / (Brazil) Bruno Soares (first round)
2. (Chinese Taipei) Chan Yung-jan / (India) Rohan Bopanna (semifinals)
3. (Czech Republic) Lucie Hradecká / (Poland) Marcin Matkowski (first round)
4. (Switzerland) Martina Hingis / (India) Leander Paes (champions)
5. (Netherlands) Michaëlla Krajicek / (Netherlands) Jean-Julien Rojer (withdrew)
6. (Kazakhstan) Yaroslava Shvedova / (Colombia) Juan Sebastián Cabal (quarterfinals)
7. (United States) Raquel Kops-Jones / (South Africa) Raven Klaasen (second round)
8. (Germany) Julia Görges / (Serbia) Nenad Zimonjić (second round)

== Draw ==
Key

- Q = Qualifier
- WC = Wild card
- LL = Lucky loser
- Alt = Alternate
- ITF = ITF entry
- PR = Protected ranking
- SR = Special ranking
- SE = Special exempt
- JE = Junior exempt
- JR = Junior Accelerator Programme entrant
- CO = College Accelerator Programme entrant
- NG = Next Gen Accelerator Program entrant
- w/o = Walkover
- r = Retired
- d = Defaulted

=== Finals ===
Semifinals
(Czech Republic) Andrea Hlaváčková (Poland) Łukasz Kubot	4	3
(United States) Bethanie Mattek-Sands (United States) Sam Querrey	6	6
4	(Switzerland) Martina Hingis (India) Leander Paes	6	7
2	(Chinese Taipei) Chan Yung-jan (India) Rohan Bopanna	2	5

Final
(United States) Bethanie Mattek-Sands (United States) Sam Querrey	4	6	[7]
4	(Switzerland) Martina Hingis (India) Leander Paes	6	3	[10]

=== Top half ===
First round
1	(India) S Mirza (Brazil) B Soares	3	3
(Czech Republic) A Hlaváčková (Poland) Ł Kubot	6	6
WC	(United States) J Brady (United States) M Krueger	2	1
WC	(United States) T Townsend (United States) D Young	6	6
WC	(Romania) A Perianu (Romania) A Dăescu	2	4
(Australia) An Rodionova (Belarus) M Mirnyi	6	6
(Slovenia) K Srebotnik (United Kingdom) D Inglot	6^{3}	6	[5]
7	(United States) R Kops-Jones (South Africa) R Klaasen	7^{7}	3	[10]
3	(Czech Republic) L Hradecká (Poland) M Matkowski	4	6	[7]
(United States) B Mattek-Sands (United States) S Querrey	6	3	[10]
(Australia) D Gavrilova (Australia) J Peers	6	6
(Romania) A Dulgheru (Romania) F Mergea	2	2
(United States) A Spears (United States) S Lipsky	7	2	[8]
Alt	(United States) L Raymond (United Kingdom) J Murray	5	6	[10]
(Slovenia) A Klepač (Colombia) R Farah	2	2
6	(Kazakhstan) Y Shvedova (Colombia) JS Cabal	6	6

Second round
(Czech Republic) A Hlaváčková (Poland) Ł Kubot	6^{3}	6	[10]
WC	(United States) T Townsend (United States) D Young	7^{7}	1	[5]
(Australia) An Rodionova (Belarus) M Mirnyi	6	6
7	(United States) R Kops-Jones (South Africa) R Klaasen	4	3
(United States) B Mattek-Sands (United States) S Querrey	6	7
(Australia) D Gavrilova (Australia) J Peers	1	5
Alt	(United States) L Raymond (United Kingdom) J Murray	5	6	[8]
6	(Kazakhstan) Y Shvedova (Colombia) JS Cabal	7	2	[10]

Quarterfinals
(Czech Republic) A Hlaváčková (Poland) Ł Kubot	6	6
(Australia) An Rodionova (Belarus) M Mirnyi	4	4
(United States) B Mattek-Sands (United States) S Querrey	3	6	[10]
6	(Kazakhstan) Y Shvedova (Colombia) JS Cabal	6	4	[6]

Semifinals
(Czech Republic) A Hlaváčková (Poland) Ł Kubot	4	3
(United States) B Mattek-Sands (United States) S Querrey	6	6

=== Bottom half ===
First round
8	(Germany) J Görges (Serbia) N Zimonjić	6	6
WC	(United States) V Duval (United States) C Harrison	1	1
(Romania) S Halep (Romania) H Tecău	6	6
(Spain) A Parra Santonja (Spain) D Marrero	1	2
(Canada) E Bouchard (Australia) N Kyrgios	5	6	[10]
(Ukraine) E Svitolina (New Zealand) A Sitak	7	3	[3]
WC	(United States) C Liu (United States) TH Fritz	2	2
4	(Switzerland) M Hingis (India) L Paes	6	6
Alt	(Spain) A Medina Garrigues (Sweden) R Lindstedt	7	3	[8]
WC	(United States) S Vickery (United States) F Tiafoe	5	6	[10]
WC	(United States) L Davis (United States) E Butorac	4	7^{7}	[5]
(Chinese Taipei) S-w Hsieh (Finland) H Kontinen	6	6^{2}	[10]
(Russia) A Kudryavtseva (Austria) A Peya	7^{7}	6
WC	(United States) C McHale (United States) S Kozlov	6^{5}	2
(Switzerland) B Bencic (Spain) F Verdasco	4	4
2	(Chinese Taipei) Y-j Chan (India) R Bopanna	6	6

Second round
8	(Germany) J Görges (Serbia) N Zimonjić	2	5
(Romania) S Halep (Romania) H Tecău	6	7
(Canada) E Bouchard (Australia) N Kyrgios
4	(Switzerland) M Hingis (India) L Paes	w/o
WC	(United States) S Vickery (United States) F Tiafoe	5	5
(Chinese Taipei) S-w Hsieh (Finland) H Kontinen	7	7
(Russia) A Kudryavtseva (Austria) A Peya	6	3	[8]
2	(Chinese Taipei) Y-j Chan (India) R Bopanna	3	6	[10]

Quarterfinals
(Romania) S Halep (Romania) H Tecău
4	(Switzerland) M Hingis (India) L Paes	w/o
(Chinese Taipei) S-w Hsieh (Finland) H Kontinen	6^{7}	7	[11]
2	(Chinese Taipei) Y-j Chan (India) R Bopanna	7^{9}	5	[13]

Semifinals
4	(Switzerland) M Hingis (India) L Paes	6	7
2	(Chinese Taipei) Y-j Chan (India) R Bopanna	2	5
