= 2015 US Open – Women's singles =

Women's singles
- 2015 US Open

Final
- Champion: (Italy) Flavia Pennetta
- Runner-up: (Italy) Roberta Vinci
- Score: 7–6^{(7–4)}, 6–2

Details
- Draw: 128 (16 Q / 8 WC )
- Seeds: 32

Events
Singles	men	women		boys	girls
Doubles	men	women	mixed	boys	girls
WC Singles	men	women	quad
WC Doubles	men	women	quad
Legends	men	women	mixed
← 2014 ·	US Open	· 2016 →

Flavia Pennetta defeated Roberta Vinci in the final, 7–6^{(7–4)}, 6–2 to win the women's singles tennis title at the 2015 US Open. It was her first and only major singles title, becoming the first woman to win her first major title after turning 30 years old. Pennetta was competing in her 49th major main draw, setting a record for the most appearances in major main draws before reaching a final. This also marked Pennetta's last major appearance, as she retired from the sport at the end of the year. Vinci was the first unseeded woman to reach a major final since Justine Henin at the 2010 Australian Open. The final made Italy the fifth country in the Open Era to have two countrywomen contest a major final (after Australia, the United States, Belgium, and Russia). This also marked the first final with two first-time major finalists since the 2010 French Open.

Serena Williams was the three-time defending champion, but lost in the semifinals to Vinci. Williams was attempting to become the fourth woman (after Maureen Connolly, Margaret Court and Steffi Graf) to complete the Grand Slam. Williams' defeat to Vinci is widely regarded as one of the biggest upsets in tennis history.

This marked the major main draw debut of future Australian Open champion Sofia Kenin, who lost to Mariana Duque Mariño in the first round.

Petra Kvitová became the first player born in the 1990s to reach the quarterfinals at all four singles majors.

== Seeds ==
1. (United States) Serena Williams (semifinals)
2. (Romania) Simona Halep (semifinals)
3. (Russia) Maria Sharapova (withdrew because of a right leg injury)
4. (Denmark) Caroline Wozniacki (second round)
5. (Czech Republic) Petra Kvitová (quarterfinals)
6. (Czech Republic) Lucie Šafářová (first round)
7. (Serbia) Ana Ivanovic (first round)
8. (Czech Republic) Karolína Plíšková (first round)
9. (Spain) Garbiñe Muguruza (second round)
10. (Spain) Carla Suárez Navarro (first round)
11. (Germany) Angelique Kerber (third round)
12. (Switzerland) Belinda Bencic (third round)
13. (Russia) Ekaterina Makarova (fourth round)
14. (Switzerland) Timea Bacsinszky (first round)
15. (Poland) Agnieszka Radwańska (third round)
16. (Italy) Sara Errani (third round)

17. (Ukraine) Elina Svitolina (third round)
18. (Germany) Andrea Petkovic (third round)
19. (United States) Madison Keys (fourth round)
20. (Belarus) Victoria Azarenka (quarterfinals)
21. (Serbia) Jelena Janković (first round)
22. (Australia) Samantha Stosur (fourth round)
23. (United States) Venus Williams (quarterfinals)
24. (Germany) Sabine Lisicki (fourth round)
25. (Canada) Eugenie Bouchard (fourth round, withdrew because of a concussion)
26. (Italy) Flavia Pennetta (champion)
27. (France) Alizé Cornet (first round)
28. (Romania) Irina-Camelia Begu (first round)
29. (United States) Sloane Stephens (first round)
30. (Russia) Svetlana Kuznetsova (first round)
31. (Russia) Anastasia Pavlyuchenkova (second round)
32. (Slovakia) Anna Karolína Schmiedlová (third round)

Click on the seed number of a player to go to their draw section.

== Draw ==
=== Key ===
- Q = Qualifier
- WC = Wild card
- LL = Lucky loser
- Alt = Alternate
- ITF = ITF entry
- PR = Protected ranking
- SR = Special ranking
- SE = Special exempt
- JE = Junior exempt
- JR = Junior Accelerator Programme entrant
- CO = College Accelerator Programme entrant
- NG = Next Gen Accelerator Program entrant
- w/o = Walkover
- r = Retired
- d = Defaulted

=== Finals ===
Quarterfinals
1	(United States) Serena Williams	6	1	6
23	(United States) Venus Williams	2	6	3
(France) Kristina Mladenovic	3	7	4
(Italy) Roberta Vinci	6	5	6
5	(Czech Republic) Petra Kvitová	6	4	2
26	(Italy) Flavia Pennetta	4	6	6
20	(Belarus) Victoria Azarenka	3	6	4
2	(Romania) Simona Halep	6	4	6

Semifinals
1	(United States) Serena Williams	6	4	4
(Italy) Roberta Vinci	2	6	6
26	(Italy) Flavia Pennetta	6	6
2	(Romania) Simona Halep	1	3

Final
(Italy) Roberta Vinci	6^{4}	2
26	(Italy) Flavia Pennetta	7^{7}	6

=== Top half ===
==== Section 1 ====
First round
1	(United States) S Williams	6	2
(Russia) V Diatchenko	0	0^{r}
Q	(Netherlands) K Bertens	3	6	6
(Croatia) M Lučić-Baroni	6	4	2
Q	(Ukraine) K Kozlova	4	3
WC	(United States) B Mattek-Sands	6	6
(United States) C Vandeweghe	6	6
29	(United States) S Stephens	4	3
19	(United States) M Keys	6	6
(Czech Republic) K Koukalová	2	4
(Czech Republic) T Smitková	7^{7}	6
(Romania) A Mitu	6^{4}	2
(Poland) M Linette	7^{7}	6
(Poland) U Radwańska	6^{3}	1
(Czech Republic) K Siniaková	2	3
15	(Poland) A Radwańska	6	6

Second round
1	(United States) S Williams	7^{7}	6
Q	(Netherlands) K Bertens	6^{5}	3
WC	(United States) B Mattek-Sands	6	6
(United States) C Vandeweghe	2	1
19	(United States) M Keys	6	6
(Czech Republic) T Smitková	1	2
(Poland) M Linette	3	2
15	(Poland) A Radwańska	6	6

Third round
1	(United States) S Williams	3	7	6
WC	(United States) B Mattek-Sands	6	5	0
19	(United States) M Keys	6	6
15	(Poland) A Radwańska	3	2

Fourth round
1	(United States) S Williams	6	6
19	(United States) M Keys	3	3

==== Section 2 ====
First round
12	(Switzerland) B Bencic	6	6
(Bulgaria) S Karatantcheva	1	2
(Slovakia) D Hantuchová	3	3
(Japan) M Doi	6	6
(United States) I Falconi	6	6
WC	(United States) S Crawford	4	2
(Puerto Rico) M Puig	4	7^{9}	3
23	(United States) V Williams	6	6^{7}	6
31	(Russia) A Pavlyuchenkova	6	7
(Slovakia) M Rybáriková	4	5
Q	(Estonia) A Kontaveit	7	6
(Australia) C Dellacqua	5	2
(China) S Zheng	2	7	5
(United States) M Brengle	6	5	7
Q	(United States) A Tatishvili	6	6
8	(Czech Republic) Ka Plíšková	2	1

Second round
12	(Switzerland) B Bencic	5	7^{7}	6
(Japan) M Doi	7	6^{3}	3
(United States) I Falconi	3	7^{7}	2
23	(United States) V Williams	6	6^{2}	6
31	(Russia) A Pavlyuchenkova	5	4
Q	(Estonia) A Kontaveit	7	6
(United States) M Brengle	6	6
Q	(United States) A Tatishvili	3	2

Third round
12	(Switzerland) B Bencic	3	4
23	(United States) V Williams	6	6
Q	(Estonia) A Kontaveit	6	3	6
(United States) M Brengle	2	6	0

Fourth round
23	(United States) V Williams	6	6
Q	(Estonia) A Kontaveit	2	1

==== Section 3 ====
First round
LL	(Russia) D Kasatkina	6	4	7
(Australia) D Gavrilova	2	6	5
(Croatia) A Konjuh	6	6
(Germany) T Maria	4	4
(Spain) L Arruabarrena	2	2
(Serbia) B Jovanovski	6	6
(France) K Mladenovic	6	7
30	(Russia) S Kuznetsova	3	5
17	(Ukraine) E Svitolina	6	6
Q	(Russia) E Kulichkova	1	4
(Germany) A-L Friedsam	1	1
(Estonia) K Kanepi	6	6
(United States) L Davis	7^{7}	7^{7}
(United Kingdom) H Watson	6^{3}	6^{0}
(Brazil) T Pereira	3	3
13	(Russia) E Makarova	6	6

Second round
LL	(Russia) D Kasatkina	6	6
(Croatia) A Konjuh	4	4
(Serbia) B Jovanovski	5	1
(France) K Mladenovic	7	6
17	(Ukraine) E Svitolina	6	6
(Estonia) K Kanepi	3	4
(United States) L Davis	1	2
13	(Russia) E Makarova	6	6

Third round
LL	(Russia) D Kasatkina	2	3
(France) K Mladenovic	6	6
17	(Ukraine) E Svitolina	3	5
13	(Russia) E Makarova	6	7

Fourth round
(France) K Mladenovic	7^{7}	4	6
13	(Russia) E Makarova	6^{2}	6	1

==== Section 4 ====
First round
10	(Spain) C Suárez Navarro	1	6^{5}
(Czech Republic) D Allertová	6	7^{7}
PR	(United States) V King	4	4
(Italy) R Vinci	6	6
WC	(United States) S Kenin	3	1
(Colombia) M Duque Mariño	6	6
WC	(France) O Dodin	2	7	6
21	(Serbia) J Janković	6	5	3
25	(Canada) E Bouchard	6	6
(United States) A Riske	4	3
(Slovenia) P Hercog	6	7
(Kazakhstan) Z Diyas	2	5
Q	(United States) J Pegula	7	6
(Belgium) A Van Uytvanck	5	3
(Slovakia) D Cibulková	6	3	6
7	(Serbia) A Ivanovic	3	6	3

Second round
(Czech Republic) D Allertová	6	3	1
(Italy) R Vinci	2	6	6
(Colombia) M Duque Mariño	6	5	6
WC	(France) O Dodin	1	7	2
25	(Canada) E Bouchard	6	6^{2}	6
(Slovenia) P Hercog	3	7^{7}	3
Q	(United States) J Pegula	7	5	3
(Slovakia) D Cibulková	5	7	6

Third round
(Italy) R Vinci	6	5	6
(Colombia) M Duque Mariño	1	7	2
25	(Canada) E Bouchard	7^{11}	4	6
(Slovakia) D Cibulková	6^{9}	6	3

Fourth round
(Italy) R Vinci	w/o
25	(Canada) E Bouchard

=== Bottom half ===
==== Section 5 ====
First round
5	(Czech Republic) P Kvitová	6	6
Q	(Germany) L Siegemund	1	1
(Spain) L Domínguez Lino	3	6	4
WC	(United States) N Gibbs	6	3	6
(Serbia) A Krunić	6	5	1
(Montenegro) D Kovinić	4	7	6
(Germany) J Görges	3	4
32	(Slovakia) AK Schmiedlová	6	6
18	(Germany) A Petkovic	3	6	7
(France) C Garcia	6	4	5
PR	(United Kingdom) L Robson	6	3	5
(Russia) E Vesnina	3	6	7
WC	(United States) L Chirico	3	0
Q	(United Kingdom) J Konta	6	6
(Germany) C Witthöft	2	4
9	(Spain) G Muguruza	6	6

Second round
5	(Czech Republic) P Kvitová	6	6
WC	(United States) N Gibbs	3	4
(Montenegro) D Kovinić	4	7	4
32	(Slovakia) AK Schmiedlová	6	5	6
18	(Germany) A Petkovic	6	7^{7}
(Russia) E Vesnina	3	6^{4}
Q	(United Kingdom) J Konta	7^{7}	6^{4}	6
9	(Spain) G Muguruza	6^{4}	7^{7}	2

Third round
5	(Czech Republic) P Kvitová	6	6
32	(Slovakia) AK Schmiedlová	2	1
18	(Germany) A Petkovic	6^{2}	3
Q	(United Kingdom) J Konta	7^{7}	6

Fourth round
5	(Czech Republic) P Kvitová	7	6
Q	(United Kingdom) J Konta	5	3

==== Section 6 ====
First round
16	(Italy) S Errani	6	6
Q	(Japan) M Hibi	0	1
Q	(Latvia) J Ostapenko	6	1	6
(Germany) A Beck	4	6	4
(Russia) E Rodina	6	6
Q	(Croatia) T Mrdeža	2	2
(Hungary) T Babos	3	4
22	(Australia) S Stosur	6	6
26	(Italy) F Pennetta	6	3	6
(Australia) J Gajdošová	1	6	1
Q	(Russia) A Panova	6^{3}	7	3
(Romania) M Niculescu	7^{7}	5	6
(United States) C McHale	6	4	3
PR	(Czech Republic) P Cetkovská	4	6	6
WC	(United States) J Loeb	2	0
4	(Denmark) C Wozniacki	6	6

Second round
16	(Italy) S Errani	0	6	6
Q	(Latvia) J Ostapenko	6	4	3
(Russia) E Rodina	1	1
22	(Australia) S Stosur	6	6
26	(Italy) F Pennetta	6	6
(Romania) M Niculescu	1	4
PR	(Czech Republic) P Cetkovská	6	5	7^{7}
4	(Denmark) C Wozniacki	4	7	6^{1}

Third round
16	(Italy) S Errani	5	6	1
22	(Australia) S Stosur	7	2	6
26	(Italy) F Pennetta	1	6	6
PR	(Czech Republic) P Cetkovská	6	1	4

Fourth round
22	(Australia) S Stosur	4	4
26	(Italy) F Pennetta	6	6

==== Section 7 ====
First round
6	(Czech Republic) L Šafářová	4	1
(Ukraine) L Tsurenko	6	6
(United States) V Lepchenko	6	6
(Belgium) K Flipkens	1	1
(Bulgaria) T Pironkova	7	6^{4}	1
(Germany) M Barthel	5	7^{7}	6
(Belarus) O Govortsova	6	0	7^{7}
28	(Romania) I-C Begu	1	6	6^{3}
20	(Belarus) V Azarenka	6	6
(Czech Republic) L Hradecká	1	2
(Italy) F Schiavone	3	1
(Belgium) Y Wickmayer	6	6
(Australia) A Tomljanović	7^{7}	2	4
(Italy) K Knapp	6^{1}	6	6
(Romania) A Dulgheru	3	1
11	(Germany) A Kerber	6	6

Second round
(Ukraine) L Tsurenko	6^{7}	2
(United States) V Lepchenko	7^{9}	6
(Germany) M Barthel	2	6	6
(Belarus) O Govortsova	6	2	4
20	(Belarus) V Azarenka	7	6
(Belgium) Y Wickmayer	5	4
(Italy) K Knapp	5	2
11	(Germany) A Kerber	7	6

Third round
(United States) V Lepchenko	1	6	6
(Germany) M Barthel	6	3	4
20	(Belarus) V Azarenka	7	2	6
11	(Germany) A Kerber	5	6	4

Fourth round
(United States) V Lepchenko	3	4
20	(Belarus) V Azarenka	6	6

==== Section 8 ====
First round
14	(Switzerland) T Bacsinszky	5	0
(Czech Republic) B Strýcová	7	6
Q	(Greece) M Sakkari	5	2
(China) Q Wang	7	6
(Italy) C Giorgi	6	6
(Sweden) J Larsson	3	3
Q	(Belarus) A Sasnovich	1	4
24	(Germany) S Lisicki	6	6
27	(France) A Cornet	6	4	4
(Japan) K Nara	2	6	6
Q	(United States) S Rogers	6	6
WC	(United States) S Vickery	2	2
(Kazakhstan) Y Putintseva	0	3
Q	(Ukraine) K Bondarenko	6	6
(New Zealand) M Erakovic	2	0^{r}
2	(Romania) S Halep	6	3

Second round
(Czech Republic) B Strýcová	6	4	7
(China) Q Wang	2	6	5
(Italy) C Giorgi	4	0
24	(Germany) S Lisicki	6	6
(Japan) K Nara	4	4
Q	(United States) S Rogers	6	6
Q	(Ukraine) K Bondarenko	3	4
2	(Romania) S Halep	6	6

Third round
(Czech Republic) B Strýcová	4	6	5
24	(Germany) S Lisicki	6	4	7
Q	(United States) S Rogers	2	3
2	(Romania) S Halep	6	6

Fourth round
24	(Germany) S Lisicki	7^{8}	5	2
2	(Romania) S Halep	6^{6}	7	6

== Championship match statistics ==
Category	(Italy) Pennetta	(Italy) Vinci
1st serve %	48/75 (64%)	47/73 (64%)
1st serve points won	33 of 48 = 69%	26 of 47 = 55%
2nd serve points won	14 of 27 = 52%	13 of 26 = 50%
Total service points won	47 of 75 = 62.67%	39 of 73 = 53.42%
Aces	4	0
Double faults	1	1
Winners	21	20
Unforced errors	25	36
Net points won	14 of 18 = 78%	11 of 24 = 46%
Break points converted	4 of 11 = 36%	2 of 4 = 50%
Return points won	34 of 73 = 47%	28 of 75 = 37%
Total points won	81	67

Preceded by 2015 Wimbledon Championships – Women's singles	Grand Slam women's singles	Succeeded by 2016 Australian Open – Women's singles
