= 2015 US Open – Men's singles =

Men's singles
- 2015 US Open

Final
- Champion: (Serbia) Novak Djokovic
- Runner-up: (Switzerland) Roger Federer
- Score: 6–4, 5–7, 6–4, 6–4

Details
- Draw: 128
- Seeds: 32

Events
Singles	men	women		boys	girls
Doubles	men	women	mixed	boys	girls
WC Singles	men	women	quad
WC Doubles	men	women	quad
Legends	men	women	mixed
- US Open

Novak Djokovic defeated Roger Federer in the final, 6–4, 5–7, 6–4, 6–4 to win the men's singles tennis title at the 2015 US Open. It was his second US Open title and tenth major title overall. By reaching the final, Djokovic became the third man to reach all four major finals in the same year in the Open Era, after Rod Laver and Federer. The final was also a rematch of the Cincinnati final three weeks earlier, and a rematch of the 2007 US Open final eight years prior, both won by Federer.

Marin Čilić was the defending champion, but lost to Djokovic in the semifinals.

This marked the first time since the 2010 US Open that Andy Murray lost before the quarterfinals of a major, losing to Kevin Anderson in the fourth round: a streak of 18 consecutive major quarterfinals (not counting the 2013 French Open, which he missed due to injury). This also marked the first time Rafael Nadal failed to win a major and reach any major semifinal since 2004, having lost in the third round to Fabio Fognini. The loss also ended Nadal's record 10-year streak of winning at least one major, and leaving him one year short of the record 11-year streak of reaching at least one major final (a record shared by Ivan Lendl and Pete Sampras).

This tournament marked the last US Open appearance of 2001 champion and former world No. 1 Lleyton Hewitt; he lost to Bernard Tomic in the second round. It also marked the first US Open main-draw appearance of future champion and world No. 1 Alexander Zverev; he lost to Philipp Kohlschreiber in the first round.

== Seeds ==
1. (Serbia) Novak Djokovic (champion)
2. (Switzerland) Roger Federer (final)
3. (United Kingdom) Andy Murray (fourth round)
4. (Japan) Kei Nishikori (first round)
5. (Switzerland) Stan Wawrinka (semifinals)
6. (Czech Republic) Tomáš Berdych (fourth round)
7. (Spain) David Ferrer (third round)
8. (Spain) Rafael Nadal (third round)
9. (Croatia) Marin Čilić (semifinals)
10. (Canada) Milos Raonic (third round)
11. (France) Gilles Simon (first round)
12. (France) Richard Gasquet (quarterfinals)
13. (United States) John Isner (fourth round)
14. (Belgium) David Goffin (third round, retired)
15. (South Africa) Kevin Anderson (quarterfinals)
16. (France) Gaël Monfils (first round, retired with an elbow injury)

17. (Bulgaria) Grigor Dimitrov (second round)
18. (Spain) Feliciano López (quarterfinals)
19. (France) Jo-Wilfried Tsonga (quarterfinals)
20. (Austria) Dominic Thiem (third round)
21. (Croatia) Ivo Karlović (second round)
22. (Serbia) Viktor Troicki (third round)
23. (Spain) Roberto Bautista Agut (fourth round)
24. (Australia) Bernard Tomic (third round)
25. (Italy) Andreas Seppi (third round)
26. (Spain) Tommy Robredo (third round)
27. (France) Jérémy Chardy (fourth round)
28. (United States) Jack Sock (second round, retired with heat illness)
29. (Germany) Philipp Kohlschreiber (third round)
30. (Brazil) Thomaz Bellucci (third round)
31. (Spain) Guillermo García-López (third round)
32. (Italy) Fabio Fognini (fourth round)

Click on the seed number of a player to go to their draw section.

== Draw ==
Key

- Q = Qualifier
- WC = Wild card
- LL = Lucky loser
- Alt = Alternate
- ITF = ITF entry
- PR = Protected ranking
- SR = Special ranking
- SE = Special exempt
- JE = Junior exempt
- JR = Junior Accelerator Programme entrant
- CO = College Accelerator Programme entrant
- NG = Next Gen Accelerator Program entrant
- w/o = Walkover
- r = Retired
- d = Defaulted

=== Finals ===
Quarterfinals
1	(Serbia) Novak Djokovic	6	3	6	7^{7}
18	(Spain) Feliciano López	1	6	3	6^{2}
19	(France) Jo-Wilfried Tsonga	4	4	6	7^{7}	4
9	(Croatia) Marin Čilić	6	6	3	6^{3}	6
5	(Switzerland) Stan Wawrinka	6	6	6
15	(South Africa) Kevin Anderson	4	4	0
12	(France) Richard Gasquet	3	3	1
2	(Switzerland) Roger Federer	6	6	6

Semifinals
1	(Serbia) Novak Djokovic	6	6	6
9	(Croatia) Marin Čilić	0	1	2
5	(Switzerland) Stan Wawrinka	4	3	1
2	(Switzerland) Roger Federer	6	6	6

Final
1	(Serbia) Novak Djokovic	6	5	6	6
2	(Switzerland) Roger Federer	4	7	4	4

=== Top half ===
==== Section 1 ====
First round
1	(Serbia) N Djokovic	6	6	6
(Brazil) J Souza	1	1	1
(Canada) V Pospisil	4	6	7^{7}	0	1
(Austria) A Haider-Maurer	6	3	6^{0}	6	6
(Russia) T Gabashvili	7^{8}	0	4	6	0
(Spain) P Andújar	6^{6}	6	6	4	0^{r}
Q	(United States) T Paul	4	0	5
25	(Italy) A Seppi	6	6	7
23	(Spain) R Bautista Agut	6	6	7^{9}
WC	(France) P-H Herbert	3	2	6^{7}
(Poland) J Janowicz	3	6	2	4
(Spain) P Carreño Busta	6	4	6	6
(Portugal) J Sousa	2	2	6	6	6^{4}
(Lithuania) R Berankis	6	6	4	2	7^{7}
(Italy) S Bolelli	4	1	2
14	(Belgium) D Goffin	6	6	6

Second round
1	(Serbia) N Djokovic	6	6	6
(Austria) A Haider-Maurer	4	1	2
(Russia) T Gabashvili	6	3	6^{3}	1
25	(Italy) A Seppi	3	6	7^{7}	6
23	(Spain) R Bautista Agut	4	6	6	2	6
(Spain) P Carreño Busta	6	4	0	6	4
(Lithuania) R Berankis	7	4	6	2	1
14	(Belgium) D Goffin	5	6	3	6	6

Third round
1	(Serbia) N Djokovic	6	7	7
25	(Italy) A Seppi	3	5	5
23	(Spain) R Bautista Agut	2	5	6	3
14	(Belgium) D Goffin	6	7	3	1^{r}

Fourth round
1	(Serbia) N Djokovic	6	4	6	6
23	(Spain) R Bautista Agut	3	6	4	3

==== Section 2 ====
First round
10	(Canada) M Raonic	6	7^{10}	6
(United States) T Smyczek	4	6^{8}	1
(Spain) F Verdasco	3	6	6^{3}	6	6
PR	(Germany) T Haas	6	1	7^{7}	3	1
(Italy) M Cecchinato	7^{7}	3	1	3
PR	(United States) M Fish	6^{5}	6	6	6
Q	(Georgia (country)) N Basilashvili	6^{5}	1	3
18	(Spain) F López	7^{7}	6	6
32	(Italy) F Fognini	2	6	6	7^{7}
(United States) S Johnson	6	3	4	6^{2}
(Uruguay) P Cuevas	6	3	6	6
(Israel) D Sela	2	6	4	1
Q	(Sweden) E Ymer	3	2	2
(Argentina) D Schwartzman	6	6	6
(Croatia) B Ćorić	3	2	6	4
8	(Spain) R Nadal	6	6	4	6

Second round
10	(Canada) M Raonic	6	6	6^{5}	7^{7}
(Spain) F Verdasco	2	4	7^{7}	6^{1}
PR	(United States) M Fish	6	3	6	5	3
18	(Spain) F López	2	6	1	7	6
32	(Italy) F Fognini	6	6	6
(Uruguay) P Cuevas	3	4	4
(Argentina) D Schwartzman	6^{5}	3	5
8	(Spain) R Nadal	7^{7}	6	7

Third round
10	(Canada) M Raonic	2	6^{4}	3
18	(Spain) F López	6	7^{7}	6
32	(Italy) F Fognini	3	4	6	6	6
8	(Spain) R Nadal	6	6	4	3	4

Fourth round
18	(Spain) F López	6	7^{7}	6
32	(Italy) F Fognini	3	6^{5}	1

==== Section 3 ====
First round
4	(Japan) K Nishikori	4	6	6	6^{6}	4
(France) B Paire	6	3	4	7^{8}	6
(Turkey) M İlhan	6	2	6	3
PR	(Czech Republic) R Štěpánek	0	6	4	2^{r}
(Australia) S Groth	4	6	7	0
(Ukraine) A Dolgopolov	6	1	5	0^{r}
Q	(Germany) M Berrer	2	2	4
26	(Spain) T Robredo	6	6	6
19	(France) J-W Tsonga	6	6	6
(Finland) J Nieminen	3	1	1
(Slovakia) L Lacko	2	3	1
(Spain) M Granollers	6	6	6
(Ukraine) S Stakhovsky	6	3	7^{7}	6
(Australia) J Millman	1	6	6^{3}	4
Q	(Ukraine) I Marchenko	2	6	5
16	(France) G Monfils	6	4	0^{r}

Second round
(France) B Paire	6	3	6	6
(Turkey) M İlhan	3	6	4	3
(Australia) S Groth	4	6^{3}	4
26	(Spain) T Robredo	6	7^{7}	6
19	(France) J-W Tsonga	6	6	6
(Spain) M Granollers	3	4	3
(Ukraine) S Stakhovsky	6	7^{7}	4	6
Q	(Ukraine) I Marchenko	4	6^{2}	6	4

Third round
(France) B Paire	7^{7}	6	6
26	(Spain) T Robredo	6^{3}	1	1
19	(France) J-W Tsonga	6	7	6
(Ukraine) S Stakhovsky	3	5	2

Fourth round
(France) B Paire	4	3	4
19	(France) J-W Tsonga	6	6	6

==== Section 4 ====
First round
9	(Croatia) M Čilić	6	7^{7}	7^{7}
Q	(Argentina) G Pella	3	6^{3}	6^{3}
(France) L Pouille	2	7^{7}	2	4
Q	(Russia) E Donskoy	6	6^{3}	6	6
(Chinese Taipei) Y-h Lu	3	3	0^{r}
(Kazakhstan) M Kukushkin	6	6	3
Q	(Australia) M Ebden	4	2	4
17	(Bulgaria) G Dimitrov	6	6	6
27	(France) J Chardy	6	6	6^{6}	6
WC	(United States) R Shane	2	1	7^{8}	2
PR	(Germany) F Mayer	7^{7}	3	3	0^{r}
(Slovakia) M Kližan	6^{5}	6	6	3
(Serbia) F Krajinović	6	6	6
Q	(Colombia) A González	4	0	4
(Moldova) R Albot	6	5	1	0
7	(Spain) D Ferrer	4	7	6	6

Second round
9	(Croatia) M Čilić	6	6	7
Q	(Russia) E Donskoy	2	3	5
(Kazakhstan) M Kukushkin	6	7^{7}	2	4	6
17	(Bulgaria) G Dimitrov	3	6^{2}	6	6	4
27	(France) J Chardy	7	6	7^{7}
(Slovakia) M Kližan	5	4	6^{1}
(Serbia) F Krajinović	5	5	6^{4}
7	(Spain) D Ferrer	7	7	7^{7}

Third round
9	(Croatia) M Čilić	6^{5}	7^{7}	6	6^{3}	6
(Kazakhstan) M Kukushkin	7^{7}	6^{1}	3	7^{7}	1
27	(France) J Chardy	7^{8}	4	6	6
7	(Spain) D Ferrer	6^{6}	6	3	1

Fourth round
9	(Croatia) M Čilić	6	2	7^{7}	6
27	(France) J Chardy	3	6	6^{2}	1

=== Bottom half ===
==== Section 5 ====
First round
5	(Switzerland) S Wawrinka	7	6	7^{8}
(Spain) A Ramos-Viñolas	5	4	6^{6}
(South Korea) H Chung	6	6	6
(Australia) J Duckworth	3	1	2
(Luxembourg) G Müller	4	6	4	4
(Belgium) R Bemelmans	6	1	6	6
(Dominican Republic) V Estrella Burgos	2	3	2
28	(United States) J Sock	6	6	6
22	(Serbia) V Troicki	7	6	6
WC	(United States) F Tiafoe	5	4	3
(United States) R Ram	7^{7}	6	6
WC	(United States) R Harrison	6^{3}	4	1
(Latvia) E Gulbis	6	4	0^{r}
(United Kingdom) A Bedene	3	6	3
(United States) D Young	2	4	6	6	6
11	(France) G Simon	6	6	4	4	4

Second round
5	(Switzerland) S Wawrinka	7^{7}	7^{7}	7^{8}
(South Korea) H Chung	6^{2}	6^{4}	6^{6}
(Belgium) R Bemelmans	4	4	6	2
28	(United States) J Sock	6	6	3	1^{r}
22	(Serbia) V Troicki	7^{12}	6	3	6
(United States) R Ram	6^{10}	4	6	3
(United Kingdom) A Bedene	6	4	4	2
(United States) D Young	3	6	6	6

Third round
5	(Switzerland) S Wawrinka	6	7^{7}	6
(Belgium) R Bemelmans	3	6^{5}	4
22	(Serbia) V Troicki	6	6	6^{3}	2	4
(United States) D Young	4	0	7^{7}	6	6

Fourth round
5	(Switzerland) S Wawrinka	6	1	6	6
(United States) D Young	4	6	3	4

==== Section 6 ====
First round
15	(South Africa) K Anderson	7^{7}	6^{5}	7	6
Q	(Russia) A Rublev	6^{1}	7^{7}	5	3
WC	(United States) A Krajicek	3	7^{8}	7^{8}	7^{7}
(Colombia) S Giraldo	6	6^{6}	6^{6}	6^{1}
(Germany) B Becker	7^{11}	4	4	1
(Uzbekistan) D Istomin	6^{9}	6	6	6
(Spain) D Gimeno-Traver	5	3	5
20	(Austria) D Thiem	7	6	7
30	(Brazil) T Bellucci	6	7	6
(United Kingdom) J Ward	1	5	3
Q	(France) P-H Mathieu	4	6	7^{9}	1	2
Q	(Japan) Y Nishioka	6	2	6^{7}	6	6
Q	(Russia) K Kravchuk	6^{6}	4	1
(France) A Mannarino	7^{8}	6	6
(Australia) N Kyrgios	5	3	6	1
3	(United Kingdom) A Murray	7	6	4	6

Second round
15	(South Africa) K Anderson	6	6	6
WC	(United States) A Krajicek	3	4	2
(Uzbekistan) D Istomin	4	4	0^{r}
20	(Austria) D Thiem	6	6	1
30	(Brazil) T Bellucci	6	6	6
Q	(Japan) Y Nishioka	0	3	4
(France) A Mannarino	7	6	1	3	1
3	(United Kingdom) A Murray	5	4	6	6	6

Third round
15	(South Africa) K Anderson	6	7^{7}	7^{7}
20	(Austria) D Thiem	3	6^{3}	6^{3}
30	(Brazil) T Bellucci	3	2	5
3	(United Kingdom) A Murray	6	6	7

Fourth round
15	(South Africa) K Anderson	7^{7}	6	6^{2}	7^{7}
3	(United Kingdom) A Murray	6^{5}	3	7^{7}	6^{0}

==== Section 7 ====
First round
6	(Czech Republic) T Berdych	6	6	6
WC	(United States) B Fratangelo	3	2	4
(United States) D Kudla	3	5	1
Q	(Austria) J Melzer	6	7	6
(United States) S Querrey	5	6^{6}	5
(France) N Mahut	7	7^{8}	7
PR	(Serbia) J Tipsarević	6^{4}	6	6	3	1
31	(Spain) G García-López	7^{7}	4	4	6	6
24	(Australia) B Tomic	5	7^{7}	6	6
(Bosnia and Herzegovina) D Džumhur	7	6^{4}	4	3
(Kazakhstan) A Nedovyesov	0	6^{2}	0^{r}
WC	(Australia) L Hewitt	6	7^{7}	1
(Netherlands) R Haase	4	4	6	7	6
(Germany) D Brown	6	6	3	5	4
(Australia) T Kokkinakis	6	1	6	3	0^{r}
12	(France) R Gasquet	4	6	4	6	2

Second round
6	(Czech Republic) T Berdych	7^{7}	6	6
Q	(Austria) J Melzer	6^{2}	1	3
(France) N Mahut	4	2	7^{7}	1
31	(Spain) G García-López	6	6	6^{4}	6
24	(Australia) B Tomic	6	6	3	5	7
WC	(Australia) L Hewitt	3	2	6	7	5
(Netherlands) R Haase	6	3	6^{4}	4
12	(France) R Gasquet	4	6	7^{7}	6

Third round
6	(Czech Republic) T Berdych	6^{2}	7^{9}	6	6
31	(Spain) G García-López	7^{7}	6^{7}	3	3
24	(Australia) B Tomic	4	3	1
12	(France) R Gasquet	6	6	6

Fourth round
6	(Czech Republic) T Berdych	6	3	4	1
12	(France) R Gasquet	2	6	6	6

==== Section 8 ====
First round
13	(United States) J Isner	6	6	6
(Tunisia) M Jaziri	2	3	4
Q	(Australia) J-P Smith	1	6	5	6^{4}
(Russia) M Youzhny	6	3	7	7^{7}
(Czech Republic) J Veselý	6	6	6
(Italy) P Lorenzi	4	4	4
(Argentina) F Delbonis	3	5	5
21	(Croatia) I Karlović	6	7	7
29	(Germany) P Kohlschreiber	6^{0}	6	6	2	6
Q	(Germany) A Zverev	7^{7}	2	0	6	4
WC	(United States) J Donaldson	6^{7}	0	6^{4}
(Czech Republic) L Rosol	7^{9}	6	7^{7}
(Cyprus) M Baghdatis	7^{7}	3	2	1^{r}
(Belgium) S Darcis	6^{2}	6	6	3
(Argentina) L Mayer	1	2	2
2	(Switzerland) R Federer	6	6	6

Second round
13	(United States) J Isner	6	6	6
(Russia) M Youzhny	3	4	4
(Czech Republic) J Veselý	7^{7}	3	3	6	7^{7}
21	(Croatia) I Karlović	6^{3}	6	6	2	6^{4}
29	(Germany) P Kohlschreiber	7^{7}	6	6
(Czech Republic) L Rosol	6^{4}	2	2
(Belgium) S Darcis	1	2	1
2	(Switzerland) R Federer	6	6	6

Third round
13	(United States) J Isner	6	6	0
(Czech Republic) J Veselý	3	4	0^{r}
29	(Germany) P Kohlschreiber	3	4	4
2	(Switzerland) R Federer	6	6	6

Fourth round
13	(United States) J Isner	6^{0}	6^{6}	5
2	(Switzerland) R Federer	7^{7}	7^{8}	7

Preceded by 2015 Wimbledon Championships – Men's singles	Grand Slam men's singles	Succeeded by 2016 Australian Open – Men's singles
