= 2015 US Open – Men's doubles =

Men's doubles
- 2015 US Open

Final
- Champions: (France) Pierre-Hugues Herbert (France) Nicolas Mahut
- Runners-up: (United Kingdom) Jamie Murray (Australia) John Peers
- Score: 6–4, 6–4

Details
- Draw: 64
- Seeds: 16

Events
Singles	men	women		boys	girls
Doubles	men	women	mixed	boys	girls
WC Singles	men	women	quad
WC Doubles	men	women	quad
Legends	men	women	mixed
← 2014 ·	US Open	· 2016 →

Bob and Mike Bryan were the defending champions, but lost to Steve Johnson and Sam Querrey in the first round, making their earliest exit in Grand Slam since 2000 Wimbledon Championships, ending their record streak of winning at least one Grand Slam title every year for the previous 10 years.

Pierre-Hugues Herbert and Nicolas Mahut won the title, defeating Jamie Murray and John Peers in the final, 6–4, 6–4.

== Seeds ==
1. (United States) Bob Bryan / (United States) Mike Bryan (first round)
2. (Croatia) Ivan Dodig / (Brazil) Marcelo Melo (first round)
3. (Netherlands) Jean-Julien Rojer / (Romania) Horia Tecău (quarterfinals)
4. (Poland) Marcin Matkowski / (Serbia) Nenad Zimonjić (quarterfinals)
5. (Italy) Simone Bolelli / (Italy) Fabio Fognini (first round)
6. (India) Rohan Bopanna / (Romania) Florin Mergea (quarterfinals)
7. (Spain) Marcel Granollers / (Spain) Marc López (third round)
8. (United Kingdom) Jamie Murray / (Australia) John Peers (final)

9. (Canada) Daniel Nestor / (France) Édouard Roger-Vasselin (third round)
10. (Austria) Alexander Peya / (Brazil) Bruno Soares (first round)
11. (Canada) Vasek Pospisil / (United States) Jack Sock (first round)
12. (France) Pierre-Hugues Herbert / (France) Nicolas Mahut (champions)
13. (Uruguay) Pablo Cuevas / (Spain) David Marrero (first round)
14. (Colombia) Juan Sebastián Cabal / (Colombia) Robert Farah (second round)
15. (South Africa) Raven Klaasen / (United States) Rajeev Ram (third round)
16. (Spain) Feliciano López / (Belarus) Max Mirnyi (first round)

== Draw ==
=== Key ===
- Q = Qualifier
- WC = Wild card
- LL = Lucky loser
- Alt = Alternate
- ITF = ITF entry
- PR = Protected ranking
- SR = Special ranking
- SE = Special exempt
- JE = Junior exempt
- JR = Junior Accelerator Programme entrant
- CO = College Accelerator Programme entrant
- NG = Next Gen Accelerator Program entrant
- w/o = Walkover
- r = Retired
- d = Defaulted

=== Finals ===
Quarterfinals
(United States) Steve Johnson (United States) Sam Querrey	6	6
(Argentina) Leonardo Mayer (Portugal) João Sousa	3	4
4	(Poland) Marcin Matkowski (Serbia) Nenad Zimonjić	6	3	6^{4}
8	(United Kingdom) Jamie Murray (Australia) John Peers	3	6	7^{7}
12	(France) Pierre-Hugues Herbert (France) Nicolas Mahut	7^{7}	6
3	(Netherlands) Jean-Julien Rojer (Romania) Horia Tecău	6^{5}	4
6	(India) Rohan Bopanna (Romania) Florin Mergea	6^{2}	3
(United Kingdom) Dominic Inglot (Sweden) Robert Lindstedt	7^{7}	6

Semifinals
(United States) Steve Johnson (United States) Sam Querrey	4	7^{7}	6^{7}
8	(United Kingdom) Jamie Murray (Australia) John Peers	6	6^{2}	7^{9}
12	(France) Pierre-Hugues Herbert (France) Nicolas Mahut	7	6
(United Kingdom) Dominic Inglot (Sweden) Robert Lindstedt	5	2

Final
8	(United Kingdom) Jamie Murray (Australia) John Peers	4	4
12	(France) Pierre-Hugues Herbert (France) Nicolas Mahut	6	6

=== Top half ===
==== Section 1 ====
First round
1	(United States) B Bryan (United States) M Bryan	6^{4}	7	3
(United States) S Johnson (United States) S Querrey	7^{7}	5	6
PR	(Germany) F Mayer (Germany) F Moser	2	3
(India) L Paes (Spain) F Verdasco	6	6
WC	(United States) M Russell (United States) D Young	6	3	6
(Belgium) D Goffin (Austria) D Thiem	3	6	3
WC	(United States) D Kudla (United States) T Smyczek	5	2
14	(Colombia) JS Cabal (Colombia) R Farah	7	6
11	(Canada) V Pospisil (United States) J Sock	6	6^{8}	5
(Argentina) L Mayer (Portugal) J Sousa	4	7^{10}	7
Alt	(Argentina) F Delbonis (Argentina) D Schwartzman	6	5	7
(Slovakia) M Kližan (Czech Republic) L Rosol	4	7	5
WC	(Australia) S Groth (Australia) L Hewitt	6	4	6
(Finland) H Kontinen (Argentina) H Zeballos	4	6	3
(United Kingdom) C Fleming (Philippines) T Huey	6	6^{3}	7^{8}
5	(Italy) S Bolelli (Italy) F Fognini	1	7^{7}	6^{6}

Second round
(United States) S Johnson (United States) S Querrey	7	4	6
(India) L Paes (Spain) F Verdasco	5	6	3
WC	(United States) M Russell (United States) D Young	6	7^{7}
14	(Colombia) JS Cabal (Colombia) R Farah	3	6^{3}
(Argentina) L Mayer (Portugal) J Sousa	6	6
Alt	(Argentina) F Delbonis (Argentina) D Schwartzman	4	4
WC	(Australia) S Groth (Australia) L Hewitt	3	4
(United Kingdom) C Fleming (Philippines) T Huey	6	6

Third round
(United States) S Johnson (United States) S Querrey	6	6
WC	(United States) M Russell (United States) D Young	2	4
(Argentina) L Mayer (Portugal) J Sousa	6	3	6
(United Kingdom) C Fleming (Philippines) T Huey	4	6	3

Quarterfinals
(United States) S Johnson (United States) S Querrey	6	6
(Argentina) L Mayer (Portugal) J Sousa	3	4

==== Section 2 ====
First round
4	(Poland) M Matkowski (Serbia) N Zimonjić	6	6
(Spain) P Carreño Busta (Spain) G García-López	3	4
(Israel) J Erlich (New Zealand) A Sitak	7^{7}	3	6^{4}
(Italy) M Cecchinato (Italy) A Seppi	6^{3}	6	7^{7}
(Belgium) S Darcis (France) B Paire	1	5
(France) A Mannarino (France) F Martin	6	7
(Lithuania) R Berankis (Russia) T Gabashvili	6	6^{1}	3
15	(South Africa) R Klaasen (United States) R Ram	4	7^{7}	6
10	(Austria) A Peya (Brazil) B Soares	3	3
(Austria) P Oswald (Canada) A Shamasdin	6	6
WC	(United States) TH Fritz (United States) R Opelka	3	6	3
(New Zealand) M Daniell (United Kingdom) J Marray	6	4	6
(Colombia) S Giraldo (Australia) R Junaid	4	6	6
WC	(Chile) J Peralta (United States) M Seeberger	6	4	4
WC	(United States) B Fratangelo (United States) D Novikov	3	2
8	(United Kingdom) J Murray (Australia) J Peers	6	6

Second round
4	(Poland) M Matkowski (Serbia) N Zimonjić	7^{7}	7
(Italy) M Cecchinato (Italy) A Seppi	6^{5}	5
(France) A Mannarino (France) F Martin	6	6^{4}	1
15	(South Africa) R Klaasen (United States) R Ram	4	7^{7}	6
(Austria) P Oswald (Canada) A Shamasdin	4	6	7^{7}
(New Zealand) M Daniell (United Kingdom) J Marray	6	4	6^{3}
(Colombia) S Giraldo (Australia) R Junaid	1	5
8	(United Kingdom) J Murray (Australia) J Peers	6	7

Third round
4	(Poland) M Matkowski (Serbia) N Zimonjić	6	7^{7}
15	(South Africa) R Klaasen (United States) R Ram	3	6^{4}
(Austria) P Oswald (Canada) A Shamasdin	4	4
8	(United Kingdom) J Murray (Australia) J Peers	6	6

Quarterfinals
4	(Poland) M Matkowski (Serbia) N Zimonjić	6	3	6^{4}
8	(United Kingdom) J Murray (Australia) J Peers	3	6	7^{7}

=== Bottom half ===
==== Section 3 ====
First round
7	(Spain) M Granollers (Spain) M López	6	6
(Netherlands) R Haase (Austria) J Knowle	3	2
(France) L Pouille (Ukraine) S Stakhovsky	7^{7}	6
(Belarus) S Betov (Spain) A Ramos-Viñolas	6^{2}	4
(United Kingdom) A Bedene (Spain) D Gimeno-Traver	3	6^{5}
(Croatia) M Pavić (New Zealand) M Venus	6	7^{7}
(Argentina) G Durán (Dominican Republic) V Estrella Burgos	3	4
12	(France) P-H Herbert (France) N Mahut	6	6
16	(Spain) F López (Belarus) M Mirnyi	6^{4}	5
(United States) E Butorac (United States) S Lipsky	7^{7}	7
(Luxembourg) G Müller (Pakistan) A-u-H Qureshi	6	6
(Serbia) D Lajović (Serbia) V Troicki	2	3
(Czech Republic) F Čermák (Czech Republic) J Veselý	6	7
(South Korea) H Chung (Kazakhstan) M Kukushkin	3	5
(Germany) A Begemann (Austria) O Marach	2	1
3	(Netherlands) J-J Rojer (Romania) H Tecău	6	6

Second round
7	(Spain) M Granollers (Spain) M López	6	4	6
(France) L Pouille (Ukraine) S Stakhovsky	4	6	2
(Croatia) M Pavić (New Zealand) M Venus	3	7^{11}	6^{7}
12	(France) P-H Herbert (France) N Mahut	6	6^{9}	7^{9}
(United States) E Butorac (United States) S Lipsky	6	6
(Luxembourg) G Müller (Pakistan) A-u-H Qureshi	4	4
(Czech Republic) F Čermák (Czech Republic) J Veselý
3	(Netherlands) J-J Rojer (Romania) H Tecău	w/o

Third round
7	(Spain) M Granollers (Spain) M López	2	3
12	(France) P-H Herbert (France) N Mahut	6	6
(United States) E Butorac (United States) S Lipsky	6^{3}	5
3	(Netherlands) J-J Rojer (Romania) H Tecău	7^{7}	7

Quarterfinals
12	(France) P-H Herbert (France) N Mahut	7^{7}	6
3	(Netherlands) J-J Rojer (Romania) H Tecău	6^{5}	4

==== Section 4 ====
First round
6	(India) R Bopanna (Romania) F Mergea	6	6
(United States) A Krajicek (United States) N Monroe	3	4
(Poland) M Fyrstenberg (Mexico) S González	6^{5}	7^{7}	6
PR	(Poland) T Bednarek (Poland) J Janowicz	7^{7}	6^{3}	4
(Austria) J Melzer (Germany) P Petzschner	5	3
(France) J Chardy (Poland) Ł Kubot	7	6
(Australia) C Guccione (Brazil) A Sá	4	4
9	(Canada) D Nestor (France) É Roger-Vasselin	6	6
13	(Uruguay) P Cuevas (Spain) D Marrero	2	6	3
PR	(Germany) T Haas (Czech Republic) R Štěpánek	6	3	6
(Brazil) T Bellucci (Brazil) M Demoliner	7^{7}	7^{7}
WC	(United States) D Baughman (United States) T Paul	6^{1}	6^{5}
(Belarus) A Bury (Uzbekistan) D Istomin	6	3	6
PR	(Moldova) R Albot (Serbia) J Tipsarević	3	6	3
(United Kingdom) D Inglot (Sweden) R Lindstedt	7^{7}	5	6
2	(Croatia) I Dodig (Brazil) M Melo	6^{3}	7	4

Second round
6	(India) R Bopanna (Romania) F Mergea	6	7^{7}
(Poland) M Fyrstenberg (Mexico) S González	3	6^{4}
(France) J Chardy (Poland) Ł Kubot	2	5
9	(Canada) D Nestor (France) É Roger-Vasselin	6	7
PR	(Germany) T Haas (Czech Republic) R Štěpánek	6	3	7^{7}
(Brazil) T Bellucci (Brazil) M Demoliner	3	6	6^{3}
(Belarus) A Bury (Uzbekistan) D Istomin	6^{5}	6^{3}
(United Kingdom) D Inglot (Sweden) R Lindstedt	7^{7}	7^{7}

Third round
6	(India) R Bopanna (Romania) F Mergea	6^{4}	6	6
9	(Canada) D Nestor (France) É Roger-Vasselin	7^{7}	4	3
PR	(Germany) T Haas (Czech Republic) R Štěpánek	4	3
(United Kingdom) D Inglot (Sweden) R Lindstedt	6	6

Quarterfinals
6	(India) R Bopanna (Romania) F Mergea	6^{2}	3
(United Kingdom) D Inglot (Sweden) R Lindstedt	7^{7}	6
