= 2015 US Open (tennis) =

- Date: August 31 – September 13
- Edition: 135th
- Category: Grand Slam (ITF)
- Draw: 128S/64D/32X
- Prize money: $42,253,400
- Surface: Hard
- Location: New York City, U.S.
- Venue: USTA Billie Jean King National Tennis Center
- Attendance: 691,280

Champions

Men's singles
- (Serbia) Novak Djokovic

Women's singles
- (Italy) Flavia Pennetta

Men's doubles
- (France) Pierre-Hugues Herbert / (France) Nicolas Mahut

Women's doubles
- (Switzerland) Martina Hingis / (India) Sania Mirza

Mixed doubles
- (Switzerland) Martina Hingis / (India) Leander Paes

Wheelchair men's singles
- (Japan) Shingo Kunieda

Wheelchair women's singles
- (United Kingdom) Jordanne Whiley

Wheelchair quad singles
- (Australia) Dylan Alcott

Wheelchair men's doubles
- (France) Stéphane Houdet / (United Kingdom) Gordon Reid

Wheelchair women's doubles
- (Netherlands) Jiske Griffioen / (Netherlands) Aniek van Koot

Wheelchair quad doubles
- (United States) Nick Taylor / (United States) David Wagner

Boys' singles
- (United States) Taylor Harry Fritz

Girls' singles
- (Hungary) Dalma Gálfi

Boys' doubles
- (Canada) Félix Auger-Aliassime / (Canada) Denis Shapovalov

Girls' doubles
- (Slovakia) Viktória Kužmová / (Russia) Aleksandra Pospelova

Men's champions invitational
- (Australia) Pat Cash / (Australia) Mark Philippoussis

Women's champions invitational
- Final Not Played
- US Open

The 2015 US Open was a tennis tournament played on outdoor hard courts. It was the 135th edition of the US Open, the fourth and final Grand Slam event of the year. It took place at the USTA Billie Jean King National Tennis Center.

Marin Čilić was the defending champion in the men's singles event, but lost to eventual champion Novak Djokovic in the semifinals. Serena Williams was the three-time defending champion in the women's singles event and was also trying to complete the first calendar Grand Slam since Steffi Graf in 1988, having won the Australian Open, French Open and Wimbledon, but lost to Roberta Vinci in the semifinals. Flavia Pennetta won the women's singles title and became the first Italian to win the US Open. The finalists Vinci and Flavia Pennetta were childhood friends from Southern Italy and grew up together.

== Tournament ==
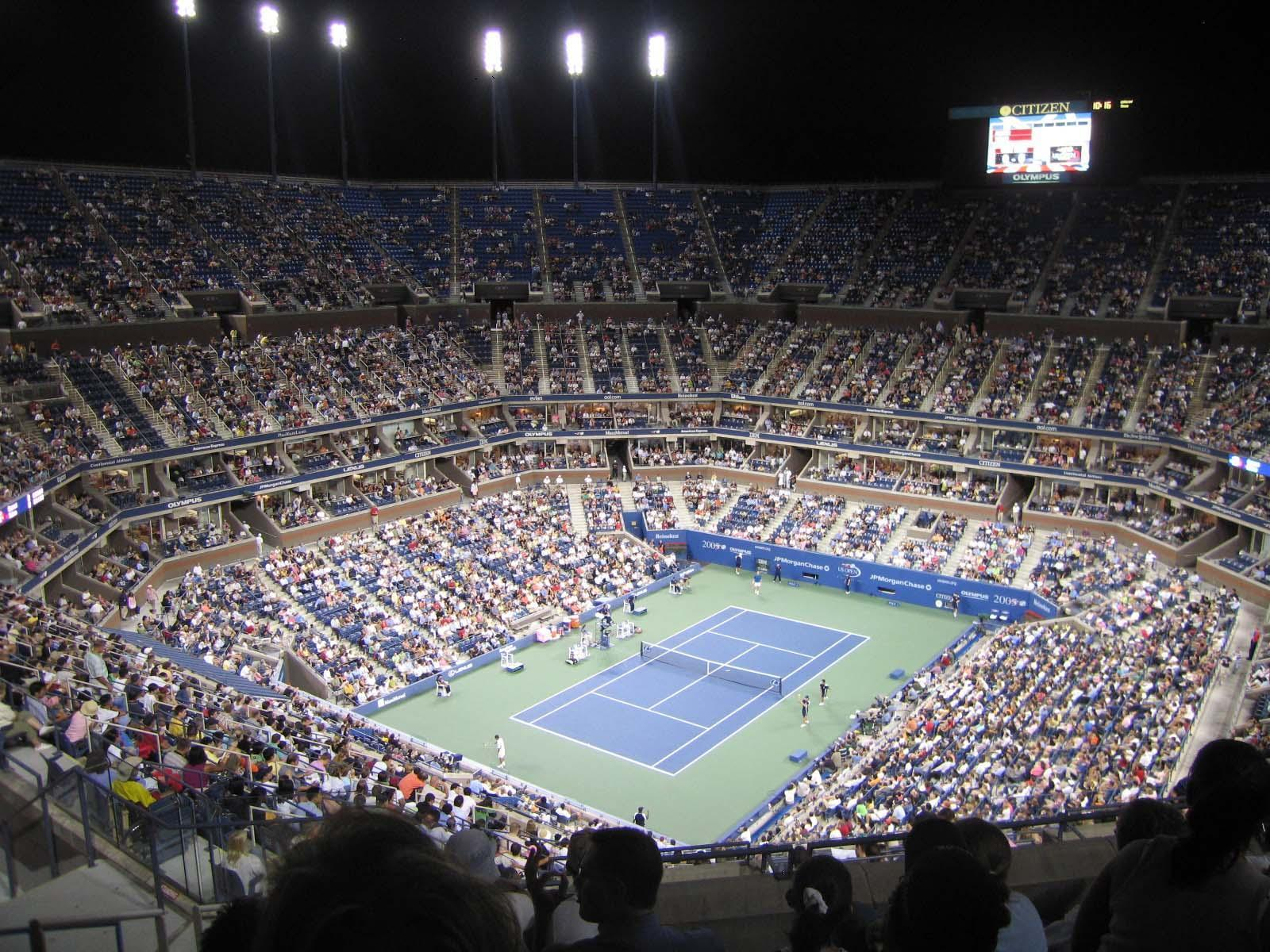
Arthur Ashe Stadium, where the Finals of US Open took place

The 2015 US Open was the 135th edition of the tournament and it was held at the USTA Billie Jean King National Tennis Center in Flushing Meadows–Corona Park of Queens in New York City, New York, United States.

The tournament was an event run by the International Tennis Federation (ITF) and is part of the 2015 ATP World Tour and the 2015 WTA Tour calendars under the Grand Slam category. The tournament consists of both men's and women's singles and doubles draws as well as a mixed doubles event. There are singles and doubles events for both boys and girls (players under 18), which is part of the Grade A category of tournaments, and singles, doubles and quad events for men's and women's wheelchair tennis players as part of the NEC tour under the Grand Slam category.

In addition, the annual men's and women's Champions Invitational doubles events were held, with eight male and eight female former Grand Slam champions taking part. For the second year running, the American Collegiate Invitational competitions is organized, where top sixteen American collegiate players compete in men's and women's singles events. Exhibition matches also take place.

The tournament is played on hard courts and takes place over a series of 17 courts with DecoTurf surface, including the three main showcourts – Arthur Ashe Stadium (with permanent steel erected and new video boards, LED court lighting and sound system in place, as part of a refurbishment project), Louis Armstrong Stadium and Grandstand. It is the last ever US Open played on courts without the operational roof on center court and with the old Grandstand in place. Starting from the 2016 edition, the Arthur Ashe Stadium will have completed retractable roof and matches will be played on newly built Grandstand.

After two years of tournament being scheduled across 15 days, the US Open returns to a traditional 14-day schedule in 2015, which has impact on all senior events. Women's singles semifinals have been scheduled for September 10 evening session, while men's singles semifinal matches will be played on Friday September 11 after mixed doubles final. Men's doubles final will be played before women's singles final on Saturday September 12, and men's singles final will follow women's doubles final.

Because Serena Williams could become the first woman to win all four major tennis titles in a calendar year since Steffi Graf accomplished the feat in 1988 and because she could tie Graf's major title count of 22, the women's final sold out before the men's final for the first time.

== Broadcast ==
In the United States, the 2015 US Open was the first under a new, 11-year, $825 million contract with ESPN, in which the broadcaster holds exclusive rights to the entire tournament and the US Open Series, thus ending CBS Sports' 46-year association with the tournament, and availability of coverage on broadcast television. This also made ESPN the exclusive U.S. broadcaster for three of the four tennis majors (the French Open is split between Tennis Channel for cable coverage and NBC for over-the-air coverage, with portions previously sub-licensed to ESPN until 2016).

== Point and prize money distribution ==
=== Point distribution ===
Below is a series of tables for each of the competitions showing the ranking points on offer for each event.

==== Senior ====
Event	W	F	SF	QF	Round of 16	Round of 32	Round of 64	Round of 128	Q	Q3	Q2	Q1
Men's singles	2000	1200	720	360	180	90	45	10	25	16	8	0
Men's doubles	2000	1200	720	360	180	90	0	—	—	—	—	—
Women's singles	2000	1300	780	430	240	130	70	10	40	30	20	2
Women's doubles	2000	1300	780	430	240	130	10	—	—	—	—	—

==== Wheelchair ====
Event	W	F	SF/3rd	QF/4th
Singles	800	500	375	100
Doubles	800	500	100	—
Quad singles	800	500	375	100
Quad doubles	800	100	—	—

==== Junior ====
Event	W	F	SF	QF	Round of 16	Round of 32	Q	Q3
Boys' singles	375	270	180	120	75	30	25	20
Girls' singles	375	270	180	120	75	30	25	20
Boys' doubles	270	180	120	75	45	—	—	—
Girls' doubles	270	180	120	75	45	—	—	—

=== Prize money ===
The US Open total prize money for 2015 was increased by 10.5 percent to a record $42,253,400, which potentially could reach almost 45 million dollars, as the top three finishers in the Emirates Airline US Open Series may earn up an additional $2.625 million in bonus money at the US Open.

Of the total prize money, $33,017,800 (plus $1,760,000 in qualifying competitions) is distributed for singles players, $4,927,600 for teams competing in doubles events and $500,000 for mixed doubles teams. Competitors in Legends Exhibition, Wheelchair and Champions Invitational events earn $570,000 while players' per diem is estimated at $1,478,000.

Event	W	F	SF	QF	Round of 16	Round of 32	Round of 64	Round of 128	Q3	Q2	Q1
Singles	$3,300,000	$1,600,000	$805,000	$410,975	$213,575	$120,200	$68,600	$39,500	$15,000	$10,000	$5,000
Doubles (Note: Prize money listed per team)	$570,000	$275,000	$133,150	$67,675	$35,025	$21,700	$14,200	—	—	—	—
Mixed doubles	$150,000	$70,000	$30,000	$15,000	$10,000	$5,000	—	—	—	—	—

Bonus prize money

Top three players in the 2015 US Open Series receive bonus prize money, depending on where they finished in the 2015 US Open, according to money schedule below.

2015 Emirates Airline US Open Series Finish	2015 US Open Finish								Awardees	
2015 Emirates Airline US Open Series Finish	W	F	SF	QF	Round of 16	Round of 32	Round of 64	Round of 128	Awardees	
1st place	$1,000,000	$500,000	$250,000	$125,000	$70,000	$40,000	$25,000	$15,000	(United Kingdom) Andy Murray	$70,000
1st place	$1,000,000	$500,000	$250,000	$125,000	$70,000	$40,000	$25,000	$15,000	(Czech Republic) Karolína Plíšková	$15,000
2nd place	$500,000	$250,000	$125,000	$62,500	$35,000	$20,000	$12,500	$7,500	(Serbia) Novak Djokovic	$500,000
2nd place	$500,000	$250,000	$125,000	$62,500	$35,000	$20,000	$12,500	$7,500	(United States) Serena Williams	$125,000
3rd place	$250,000	$125,000	$62,500	$31,250	$17,500	$10,000	$6,250	$3,750	(United States) John Isner	$17,500
3rd place	$250,000	$125,000	$62,500	$31,250	$17,500	$10,000	$6,250	$3,750	(Romania) Simona Halep	$62,500

== Singles players ==
2015 US Open – Men's singles

Champion		Runner-up	
(Serbia) Novak Djokovic [1]		(Switzerland) Roger Federer [2]	
Semifinals out
(Switzerland) Stan Wawrinka [5]		(Croatia) Marin Cilic [9]	
Quarterfinals out
(Spain) Feliciano López [18]	(France) Jo-Wilfried Tsonga [19]	(South Africa) Kevin Anderson [15]	(France) Richard Gasquet [12]
4th round out
(Spain) Roberto Bautista Agut [23]	(Italy) Fabio Fognini [32]	(France) Benoît Paire	(France) Jérémy Chardy [27]
(United States) Donald Young	(United Kingdom) Andy Murray [3]	(Czech Republic) Tomáš Berdych [6]	(United States) John Isner [13]
3rd round out
(Italy) Andreas Seppi [25]	(Belgium) David Goffin [14]	(Canada) Milos Raonic [10]	(Spain) Rafael Nadal [8]
(Spain) Tommy Robredo [26]	(Ukraine) Sergiy Stakhovsky	(Kazakhstan) Mikhail Kukushkin	(Spain) David Ferrer [7]
(Belgium) Ruben Bemelmans	(Serbia) Viktor Troicki [22]	(Austria) Dominic Thiem [20]	(Brazil) Thomaz Bellucci [30]
(Spain) Guillermo García-López [31]	(Australia) Bernard Tomic [24]	(Czech Republic) Jiří Veselý	(Germany) Philipp Kohlschreiber [29]
2nd round out
(Austria) Andreas Haider-Maurer	(Russia) Teymuraz Gabashvili	(Spain) Pablo Carreño Busta	(Lithuania) Ričardas Berankis
(Spain) Fernando Verdasco	(United States) Mardy Fish (PR)	(Uruguay) Pablo Cuevas	(Argentina) Diego Schwartzman
(Turkey) Marsel İlhan	(Australia) Sam Groth	(Spain) Marcel Granollers	(Ukraine) Illya Marchenko (Q)
(Russia) Evgeny Donskoy (Q)	(Bulgaria) Grigor Dimitrov [17]	(Slovakia) Martin Kližan	(Serbia) Filip Krajinović
(South Korea) Chung Hyeon	(United States) Jack Sock [28]	(United States) Rajeev Ram	(United Kingdom) Aljaž Bedene
(United States) Austin Krajicek (WC)	(Uzbekistan) Denis Istomin	(Japan) Yoshihito Nishioka (Q)	(France) Adrian Mannarino
(Austria) Jürgen Melzer (Q)	(France) Nicolas Mahut	(Australia) Lleyton Hewitt (WC)	(Netherlands) Robin Haase
(Russia) Mikhail Youzhny	(Croatia) Ivo Karlović [21]	(Czech Republic) Lukáš Rosol	(Belgium) Steve Darcis
1st round out
(Brazil) João Souza	(Canada) Vasek Pospisil	(Spain) Pablo Andújar	(United States) Tommy Paul (Q)
(France) Pierre-Hugues Herbert (WC)	(Poland) Jerzy Janowicz	(Portugal) João Sousa	(Italy) Simone Bolelli
(United States) Tim Smyczek	(Germany) Tommy Haas (PR)	(Italy) Marco Cecchinato	(Georgia (country)) Nikoloz Basilashvili (Q)
(United States) Steve Johnson	(Israel) Dudi Sela	(Sweden) Elias Ymer (Q)	(Croatia) Borna Ćorić
(Japan) Kei Nishikori [4]	(Czech Republic) Radek Štěpánek (PR)	(Ukraine) Alexandr Dolgopolov	(Germany) Michael Berrer (Q)
(Finland) Jarkko Nieminen	(Slovakia) Lukáš Lacko	(Australia) John Millman	(France) Gaël Monfils [16]
(Argentina) Guido Pella (Q)	(France) Lucas Pouille	(Chinese Taipei) Lu Yen-hsun	(Australia) Matthew Ebden (Q)
(United States) Ryan Shane (WC)	(Germany) Florian Mayer (PR)	(Colombia) Alejandro González (Q)	(Moldova) Radu Albot
(Spain) Albert Ramos	(Australia) James Duckworth	(Luxembourg) Gilles Müller	(Dominican Republic) Víctor Estrella Burgos
(United States) Frances Tiafoe (WC)	(United States) Ryan Harrison (WC)	(Latvia) Ernests Gulbis	(France) Gilles Simon [11]
(Russia) Andrey Rublev (Q)	(Colombia) Santiago Giraldo	(Germany) Benjamin Becker	(Spain) Daniel Gimeno-Traver
(United Kingdom) James Ward	(France) Paul-Henri Mathieu (Q)	(Russia) Konstantin Kravchuk (Q)	(Australia) Nick Kyrgios
(United States) Bjorn Fratangelo (WC)	(United States) Denis Kudla	(United States) Sam Querrey	(Serbia) Janko Tipsarević (PR)
(Bosnia and Herzegovina) Damir Džumhur	(Kazakhstan) Aleksandr Nedovyesov	(Germany) Dustin Brown	(Australia) Thanasi Kokkinakis
(Tunisia) Malek Jaziri	(Australia) John-Patrick Smith (Q)	(Italy) Paolo Lorenzi	(Argentina) Federico Delbonis
(Germany) Alexander Zverev (Q)	(United States) Jared Donaldson (WC)	(Cyprus) Marcos Baghdatis	(Argentina) Leonardo Mayer

2015 US Open – Women's singles

Champion		Runner-up	
(Italy) Flavia Pennetta [26]		(Italy) Roberta Vinci	
Semifinals out
(United States) Serena Williams [1]		(Romania) Simona Halep [2]	
Quarterfinals out
(United States) Venus Williams [23]	(France) Kristina Mladenovic	(Czech Republic) Petra Kvitová [5]	(Belarus) Victoria Azarenka [20]
4th round out
(United States) Madison Keys [19]	(Estonia) Anett Kontaveit (Q)	(Russia) Ekaterina Makarova [13]	(Canada) Eugenie Bouchard [25]
(United Kingdom) Johanna Konta (Q)	(Australia) Samantha Stosur [22]	(United States) Varvara Lepchenko	(Germany) Sabine Lisicki [24]
3rd round out
(United States) Bethanie Mattek-Sands (WC)	(Poland) Agnieszka Radwańska [15]	(Switzerland) Belinda Bencic [12]	(United States) Madison Brengle
(Russia) Daria Kasatkina (LL)	(Ukraine) Elina Svitolina [17]	(Colombia) Mariana Duque Mariño	(Slovakia) Dominika Cibulková
(Slovakia) Anna Karolína Schmiedlová [32]	(Germany) Andrea Petkovic [18]	(Italy) Sara Errani [16]	(Czech Republic) Petra Cetkovská (PR)
(Germany) Mona Barthel	(Germany) Angelique Kerber [11]	(Czech Republic) Barbora Strýcová	(United States) Shelby Rogers (Q)
2nd round out
(Netherlands) Kiki Bertens (Q)	(United States) Coco Vandeweghe	(Czech Republic) Tereza Smitková	(Poland) Magda Linette
(Japan) Misaki Doi	(United States) Irina Falconi	(Russia) Anastasia Pavlyuchenkova [31]	(United States) Anna Tatishvili (Q)
(Croatia) Ana Konjuh	(Serbia) Bojana Jovanovski	(Estonia) Kaia Kanepi	(United States) Lauren Davis
(Czech Republic) Denisa Allertová	(France) Océane Dodin (WC)	(Slovenia) Polona Hercog	(United States) Jessica Pegula (Q)
(United States) Nicole Gibbs (WC)	(Montenegro) Danka Kovinić	(Russia) Elena Vesnina	(Spain) Garbiñe Muguruza [9]
(Latvia) Jeļena Ostapenko (Q)	(Russia) Evgeniya Rodina	(Romania) Monica Niculescu	(Denmark) Caroline Wozniacki [4]
(Ukraine) Lesia Tsurenko	(Belarus) Olga Govortsova	(Belgium) Yanina Wickmayer	(Italy) Karin Knapp
(China) Wang Qiang	(Italy) Camila Giorgi	(Japan) Kurumi Nara	(Ukraine) Kateryna Bondarenko (Q)
1st round out
(Russia) Vitalia Diatchenko	(Croatia) Mirjana Lučić-Baroni	(Ukraine) Kateryna Kozlova (Q)	(United States) Sloane Stephens [29]
(Czech Republic) Klára Koukalová	(Romania) Andreea Mitu	(Poland) Urszula Radwańska	(Czech Republic) Kateřina Siniaková
(Bulgaria) Sesil Karatantcheva	(Slovakia) Daniela Hantuchová	(United States) Samantha Crawford (WC)	(Puerto Rico) Monica Puig
(Slovakia) Magdaléna Rybáriková	(Australia) Casey Dellacqua	(China) Zheng Saisai	(Czech Republic) Karolína Plíšková [8]
(Australia) Daria Gavrilova	(Germany) Tatjana Maria	(Spain) Lara Arruabarrena	(Russia) Svetlana Kuznetsova [30]
(Russia) Elizaveta Kulichkova (Q)	(Germany) Anna-Lena Friedsam	(United Kingdom) Heather Watson	(Brazil) Teliana Pereira
(Spain) Carla Suárez Navarro [10]	(United States) Vania King (PR)	(United States) Sofia Kenin (WC)	(Serbia) Jelena Janković [21]
(United States) Alison Riske	(Kazakhstan) Zarina Diyas	(Belgium) Alison Van Uytvanck	(Serbia) Ana Ivanovic [7]
(Germany) Laura Siegemund (Q)	(Spain) Lourdes Domínguez Lino	(Serbia) Aleksandra Krunić	(Germany) Julia Görges
(France) Caroline Garcia	(United Kingdom) Laura Robson (PR)	(United States) Louisa Chirico (WC)	(Germany) Carina Witthöft
(Japan) Mayo Hibi (Q)	(Germany) Annika Beck	(Croatia) Tereza Mrdeža (Q)	(Hungary) Tímea Babos
(Australia) Jarmila Gajdošová	(Russia) Alexandra Panova (Q)	(United States) Christina McHale	(United States) Jamie Loeb (WC)
(Czech Republic) Lucie Šafářová [6]	(Belgium) Kirsten Flipkens	(Bulgaria) Tsvetana Pironkova	(Romania) Irina-Camelia Begu [28]
(Czech Republic) Lucie Hradecká	(Italy) Francesca Schiavone	(Australia) Ajla Tomljanović	(Romania) Alexandra Dulgheru
(Switzerland) Timea Bacsinszky [14]	(Greece) Maria Sakkari (Q)	(Sweden) Johanna Larsson	(Belarus) Aliaksandra Sasnovich (Q)
(France) Alizé Cornet [27]	(United States) Sachia Vickery (WC)	(Kazakhstan) Yulia Putintseva	(New Zealand) Marina Erakovic

== Day-by-day summaries ==
=== Before the tournament ===
- Maria Sharapova, the 2006 champion, ranked third in the world (formerly first), withdrew from the tournament due to a leg injury the day before tournament began. Making her withdrawal that was for the second time in three years.

=== Day 4 ===
- British qualifier Johanna Konta upset the 9th seeded Garbiñe Muguruza won in three sets at 7–6^{(7–4)}, 6–7^{(4–7)}, 6–2 on an epic longest match at three hours and twenty-three minutes, surpassing Nadia Petrova–Samantha Stosur match in the 2011 US Open.

=== Day 6 ===
- Eugenie Bouchard announced that she is withdrawing from the tournament citing a concussion days before her scheduled fourth round match with 43rd-ranked Roberta Vinci. She also withdrew from Women's Doubles and Mixed Doubles. Due to a withdrawal issue, Vinci advanced to her US Open quarterfinal in four years.

=== Day 8 ===
- Kevin Anderson, the 15th seed, upset the 3rd seeded Andy Murray in the fourth round on a four setter win. This was the first time since 2010 US Open that Murray failed to reach his Slam quarterfinal. Anderson became the first South African to reach a Slam quarterfinal since Wayne Ferreira at the 2003 Australian Open.

=== Day 9 and 10 ===
- In the women's quarterfinals, Kristina Mladenovic, Petra Kvitová and Simona Halep reached in their first US Open quarterfinal. For Mladenovic, it was her first Grand Slam singles quarterfinal overall six years after her first Slam debut.

=== Day 11 ===
- The women's semifinals was scheduled to be on September 10 but was canceled due to a rain.

=== Day 12 ===
- Roberta Vinci defeated Women's No. 1 and 3-time defending champion Serena Williams in three sets. This loss ended Williams' bid to win a calendar-year Grand Slam.

=== Day 13 ===
- In the women's final, the two players were Italian: Vinci and Flavia Pennetta. This was the first time this happened in the Open Era.

== Events ==
=== Men's singles ===
- (Serbia) Novak Djokovic def. (Switzerland) Roger Federer, 6–4, 5–7, 6–4, 6–4

=== Women's singles ===
- (Italy) Flavia Pennetta def. (Italy) Roberta Vinci, 7–6^{(7–4)}, 6–2

=== Men's doubles ===
- (France) Pierre-Hugues Herbert / (France) Nicolas Mahut def. (United Kingdom) Jamie Murray / (Australia) John Peers, 6–4, 6–4

=== Women's doubles ===
- (Switzerland) Martina Hingis / (India) Sania Mirza def. (Australia) Casey Dellacqua / (Kazakhstan) Yaroslava Shvedova, 6–3, 6–3

=== Mixed doubles ===
- (Switzerland) Martina Hingis / (India) Leander Paes def. (United States) Bethanie Mattek-Sands / (United States) Sam Querrey, 6–4, 3–6, [10–7]

=== Junior boys' singles ===
- (United States) Taylor Harry Fritz def. (United States) Tommy Paul, 6–2, 6–7^{(4–7)}, 6–2

=== Junior girls' singles ===
- (Hungary) Dalma Gálfi def. (United States) Sofia Kenin, 7–5, 6–4

=== Junior boys' doubles ===
- (Canada) Félix Auger-Aliassime / (Canada) Denis Shapovalov def. (United States) Brandon Holt / (United States) Riley Smith, 7–5, 7–6^{(7–3)}

=== Junior girls' doubles ===
- (Slovakia) Viktória Kužmová / (Russia) Aleksandra Pospelova def. (Russia) Anna Kalinskaya / (Russia) Anastasia Potapova, 7–5, 6–2

=== Men's champions doubles ===
- (Australia) Pat Cash / (Australia) Mark Philippoussis def. (United States) Michael Chang / (United States) Todd Martin, 6–2, 6–1

=== Women's champions doubles ===
- (United States) Lindsay Davenport / (United States) Mary Joe Fernández vs (United States) Tracy Austin / (United States) Gigi Fernández, not played

=== Wheelchair men's singles ===
- (Japan) Shingo Kunieda def. (France) Stéphane Houdet, 6–7^{(4–7)}, 6–3, 6–2

=== Wheelchair women's singles ===
- (United Kingdom) Jordanne Whiley def. (Japan) Yui Kamiji, 6–4, 0–6, 6–1

=== Wheelchair quad singles ===
- (Australia) Dylan Alcott def. (United States) David Wagner, 6–1, 4–6, 7–5

=== Wheelchair men's doubles ===
- (France) Stéphane Houdet / (United Kingdom) Gordon Reid def. (France) Michaël Jeremiasz / (France) Nicolas Peifer, 6–3, 6–1

=== Wheelchair women's doubles ===
- (Netherlands) Jiske Griffioen / (Netherlands) Aniek van Koot def. (Netherlands) Marjolein Buis / (Germany) Sabine Ellerbrock, 7–6^{(7–3)}, 6–1

=== Wheelchair quad doubles ===
- (United States) Nick Taylor / (United States) David Wagner def. (Australia) Dylan Alcott / (United Kingdom) Andrew Lapthorne, 4–6, 6–2, [10–7]

== Singles seeds ==
Seedings are based on rankings as of August 24, 2015. Rankings and points before are as of August 31, 2015.

Because the tournament takes place one week later than in 2014, points defending includes results from both the 2014 US Open and tournaments from the week of September 8, 2014 (Davis Cup for the men; Hong Kong, Québec, and Tashkent for the women).

=== Men's singles ===
Seed	Rank	Player	Points before	Points defending	Points won	Points after	Status
1	1	(Serbia) Novak Djokovic	14,865	720	2,000	16,145	Champion, defeated (Switzerland) Roger Federer [2]
2	2	(Switzerland) Roger Federer	9,065	720+140	1,200	9,405	Runner-up, lost to (Serbia) Novak Djokovic [1]
3	3	(United Kingdom) Andy Murray	8,840	360	180	8,660	Fourth round lost to (South Africa) Kevin Anderson [15]
4	4	(Japan) Kei Nishikori	6,205	1,200	10	5,015	First round lost to (France) Benoît Paire
5	5	(Switzerland) Stan Wawrinka	5,710	360+70	720	6,000	Semifinals lost to (Switzerland) Roger Federer [2]
6	6	(Czech Republic) Tomáš Berdych	5,230	360	180	5,050	Fourth round lost to (France) Richard Gasquet [12]
7	7	(Spain) David Ferrer	3,695	90	90	3,695	Third round lost to (France) Jérémy Chardy [27]
8	8	(Spain) Rafael Nadal	3,680	0	90	3,770	Third round lost to (Italy) Fabio Fognini [32]
9	9	(Croatia) Marin Čilić	3,550	2,000	720	2,270	Semifinals lost to (Serbia) Novak Djokovic [1]
10	10	(Canada) Milos Raonic	2,880	180	90	2,790	Third round lost to (Spain) Feliciano López [18]
11	11	(France) Gilles Simon	2,730	180	10	2,560	First round lost to (United States) Donald Young
12	12	(France) Richard Gasquet	2,240	90+65	360+45	2,490	Quarterfinals lost to (Switzerland) Roger Federer [2]
13	13	(United States) John Isner	2,235	90	180	2,325	Fourth round lost to (Switzerland) Roger Federer [2]
14	15	(Belgium) David Goffin	2,130	90+15	90	2,115	Third round retired against (Spain) Roberto Bautista Agut [23]
15	14	(South Africa) Kevin Anderson	2,160	90	360	2,430	Quarterfinals lost to (Switzerland) Stan Wawrinka [5]
16	16	(France) Gaël Monfils	1,850	360	10	1,500	First round retired against (Ukraine) Illya Marchenko [Q]
17	17	(Bulgaria) Grigor Dimitrov	1,735	180	45	1,600	Second round lost to (Kazakhstan) Mikhail Kukushkin
18	19	(Spain) Feliciano López	1,665	90	360	1,935	Quarterfinals lost to (Serbia) Novak Djokovic [1]
19	18	(France) Jo-Wilfried Tsonga	1,675	180+70	360	1,785	Quarterfinals lost to (Croatia) Marin Čilić [9]
20	20	(Austria) Dominic Thiem	1,645	180	90	1,555	Third round lost to (South Africa) Kevin Anderson [15]
21	21	(Croatia) Ivo Karlović	1,620	45	45	1,620	Second round lost to (Czech Republic) Jiří Veselý
22	22	(Serbia) Viktor Troicki	1,559	(83)+100	90+45	1,511	Third round lost to (United States) Donald Young
23	23	(Spain) Roberto Bautista Agut	1,510	180	180	1,510	Fourth round lost to (Serbia) Novak Djokovic [1]
24	24	(Australia) Bernard Tomic	1,465	45	90	1,510	Third round lost to (France) Richard Gasquet [12]
25	25	(Italy) Andreas Seppi	1,430	45	90	1,475	Third round lost to (Serbia) Novak Djokovic [1]
26	26	(Spain) Tommy Robredo	1,405	180	90	1,315	Third round lost to (France) Benoît Paire
27	27	(France) Jérémy Chardy	1,300	45	180	1,435	Fourth round lost to (Croatia) Marin Čilić [9]
28	28	(United States) Jack Sock	1,250	10	45	1,285	Second round retired against (Belgium) Ruben Bemelmans
29	29	(Germany) Philipp Kohlschreiber	1,230	180	90	1,140	Third round lost to (Switzerland) Roger Federer [2]
30	30	(Brazil) Thomaz Bellucci	1,190	45	90	1,235	Third round lost to (United Kingdom) Andy Murray [3]
31	31	(Spain) Guillermo García-López	1,190	45	90	1,235	Third round lost to (Czech Republic) Tomáš Berdych [6]
32	32	(Italy) Fabio Fognini	1,165	45	180	1,300	Fourth round lost to (Spain) Feliciano López [18]

=== Women's singles ===
Seed	Rank	Player	Points before	Points defending	Points won	Points after	Status
1	1	(United States) Serena Williams	12,721	2,000	780	11,501	Semifinals lost to (Italy) Roberta Vinci
2	2	(Romania) Simona Halep	6,130	130	780	6,780	Semifinals lost to (Italy) Flavia Pennetta [26]
~~3~~	~~3~~	~~(Russia) Maria Sharapova~~	6,035	240	0	5,795	Withdrew due to right leg injury
4	5	(Denmark) Caroline Wozniacki	4,740	1,300	70	3,510	Second round lost to (Czech Republic) Petra Cetkovská [PR]
5	4	(Czech Republic) Petra Kvitová	4,995	130	430	5,295	Quarterfinals lost to (Italy) Flavia Pennetta [26]
6	6	(Czech Republic) Lucie Šafářová	3,800	240	10	3,570	First round lost to (Ukraine) Lesia Tsurenko
7	7	(Serbia) Ana Ivanovic	3,500	70	10	3,440	First round lost to (Slovakia) Dominika Cibulková
8	8	(Czech Republic) Karolína Plíšková	3,335	130	10	3,215	First round lost to (United States) Anna Tatishvili [Q]
9	9	(Spain) Garbiñe Muguruza	3,245	10	70	3,305	Second round lost to (United Kingdom) Johanna Konta [Q]
10	10	(Spain) Carla Suárez Navarro	3,190	130	10	3,070	First round lost to (Czech Republic) Denisa Allertová
11	11	(Germany) Angelique Kerber	3,150	130	130	3,150	Third round lost to (Belarus) Victoria Azarenka [20]
12	12	(Switzerland) Belinda Bencic	3,035	430	130	2,735	Third round lost to (United States) Venus Williams [23]
13	13	(Russia) Ekaterina Makarova	2,920	780	240	2,380	Fourth round lost to (France) Kristina Mladenovic
14	14	(Switzerland) Timea Bacsinszky	2,896	70	10	2,836	First round lost to (Czech Republic) Barbora Strýcová
15	15	(Poland) Agnieszka Radwańska	2,760	70	130	2,820	Third round lost to (United States) Madison Keys [19]
16	16	(Italy) Sara Errani	2,610	430	130	2,310	Third round lost to (Australia) Samantha Stosur [22]
17	17	(Ukraine) Elina Svitolina	2,530	10	130	2,650	Third round lost to (Russia) Ekaterina Makarova [13]
18	18	(Germany) Andrea Petkovic	2,450	130	130	2,450	Third round lost to (United Kingdom) Johanna Konta [Q]
19	19	(United States) Madison Keys	2,275	70	240	2,445	Fourth round lost to (United States) Serena Williams [1]
20	20	(Belarus) Victoria Azarenka	2,271	430	430	2,271	Quarterfinals lost to (Romania) Simona Halep [2]
21	21	(Serbia) Jelena Janković	2,135	240	10	1,905	First round lost to (France) Océane Dodin [WC]
22	22	(Australia) Samantha Stosur	2,135	70	240	2,305	Fourth round lost to (Italy) Flavia Pennetta [26]
23	23	(United States) Venus Williams	2,072	130+180	430+1	2,193	Quarterfinals lost to (United States) Serena Williams [1]
24	24	(Germany) Sabine Lisicki	1,945	130+280	240+1	1,776	Fourth round lost to (Romania) Simona Halep [2]
25	25	(Canada) Eugenie Bouchard	1,887	240	240	1,887	Fourth round withdrew due to a concussion
26	26	(Italy) Flavia Pennetta	1,747	430	2,000	3,317	Champion, defeated (Italy) Roberta Vinci
27	27	(France) Alizé Cornet	1,745	130	10	1,625	First round lost to (Japan) Kurumi Nara
28	28	(Romania) Irina-Camelia Begu	1,676	70+30	10+1	1,587	First round lost to (Belarus) Olga Govortsova
29	29	(United States) Sloane Stephens	1,621	70	10	1,561	First round lost to (United States) Coco Vandeweghe
30	30	(Russia) Svetlana Kuznetsova	1,572	10	10	1,572	First round lost to (France) Kristina Mladenovic
31	31	(Russia) Anastasia Pavlyuchenkova	1,550	70	70	1,550	Second round lost to (Estonia) Anett Kontaveit (Q)
32	32	(Slovakia) Anna Karolína Schmiedlová	1,451	10	130	1,571	Third round lost to (Czech Republic) Petra Kvitová [5]

== Doubles seeds ==
=== Men's doubles ===
Team		Rank^{1}	Seed
(United States) Bob Bryan	(United States) Mike Bryan	2	1
(Croatia) Ivan Dodig	(Brazil) Marcelo Melo	7	2
(Netherlands) Jean-Julien Rojer	(Romania) Horia Tecău	11	3
(Poland) Marcin Matkowski	(Serbia) Nenad Zimonjić	16	4
(Italy) Simone Bolelli	(Italy) Fabio Fognini	19	5
(India) Rohan Bopanna	(Romania) Florin Mergea	22	6
(Spain) Marcel Granollers	(Spain) Marc López	29	7
(United Kingdom) Jamie Murray	(Australia) John Peers	29	8
(Canada) Daniel Nestor	(France) Édouard Roger-Vasselin	35	9
(Austria) Alexander Peya	(Brazil) Bruno Soares	42	10
(Canada) Vasek Pospisil	(United States) Jack Sock	43	11
(France) Pierre-Hugues Herbert	(France) Nicolas Mahut	44	12
(Uruguay) Pablo Cuevas	(Spain) David Marrero	55	13
(Colombia) Juan Sebastián Cabal	(Colombia) Robert Farah	55	14
(South Africa) Raven Klaasen	(United States) Rajeev Ram	58	15
(Spain) Feliciano López	(Belarus) Max Mirnyi	73	16

- ^{1} Rankings are as of August 24, 2015.

=== Women's doubles ===
Team		Rank^{1}	Seed
(Switzerland) Martina Hingis	(India) Sania Mirza	3	1
~~(United States) Bethanie Mattek-Sands~~	~~(Czech Republic) Lucie Šafářová~~	~~9~~	~~2~~
(Hungary) Tímea Babos	(France) Kristina Mladenovic	20	3
(Australia) Casey Dellacqua	(Kazakhstan) Yaroslava Shvedova	25	4
(France) Caroline Garcia	(Slovenia) Katarina Srebotnik	25	5
(United States) Raquel Kops-Jones	(United States) Abigail Spears	35	6
(Czech Republic) Andrea Hlaváčková	(Czech Republic) Lucie Hradecká	35	7
(Spain) Garbiñe Muguruza	(Spain) Carla Suárez Navarro	40	8
(Chinese Taipei) Chan Hao-ching	(Chinese Taipei) Chan Yung-jan	42	9
(Chinese Taipei) Hsieh Su-wei	(Australia) Anastasia Rodionova	44	10
(Italy) Sara Errani	(Italy) Flavia Pennetta	45	11
(Russia) Alla Kudryavtseva	(Russia) Anastasia Pavlyuchenkova	52	12
(Netherlands) Michaëlla Krajicek	(Czech Republic) Barbora Strýcová	53	13
(Spain) Anabel Medina Garrigues	(Spain) Arantxa Parra Santonja	63	14
(Spain) Lara Arruabarrena	(Slovenia) Andreja Klepač	74	15
(Germany) Julia Görges	(Poland) Klaudia Jans-Ignacik	78	16
(Italy) Karin Knapp	(Italy) Roberta Vinci	86	17

- ^{1} Rankings are as of August 24, 2015.

=== Mixed doubles ===
Team		Rank^{1}	Seed
(India) Sania Mirza	(Brazil) Bruno Soares	21	1
(Chinese Taipei) Chan Yung-jan	(India) Rohan Bopanna	26	2
(Czech Republic) Lucie Hradecká	(Poland) Marcin Matkowski	30	3
(Switzerland) Martina Hingis	(India) Leander Paes	31	4
~~(Netherlands) Michaëlla Krajicek~~	~~(Netherlands) Jean-Julien Rojer~~	~~35~~	~~5~~
(Kazakhstan) Yaroslava Shvedova	(Colombia) Juan Sebastián Cabal	42	6
(United States) Raquel Kops-Jones	(South Africa) Raven Klaasen	43	7
(Germany) Julia Görges	(Serbia) Nenad Zimonjić	44	8

- ^{1} Rankings are as of August 24, 2015.

== Wild card entries ==
The following players received wild cards into the main draw senior events.

=== Men's singles ===
- (United States) Jared Donaldson
- (United States) Bjorn Fratangelo (Note: Winner of the Men's USTA Pro Circuit's US Open Wild Card Challenge held in Binghamton, N.Y., Lexington, Ky. and Aptos, Calif.)
- (United States) Ryan Harrison
- (France) Pierre-Hugues Herbert
- (Australia) Lleyton Hewitt
- (United States) Austin Krajicek
- (United States) Ryan Shane (Note: Winner of the men's singles tournament in the 2015 NCAA Division I Tennis Championships)
- (United States) Frances Tiafoe (Note: Winner of the Kalamazoo Wild Card tournament)

=== Women's singles ===
- (United States) Louisa Chirico
- (United States) Samantha Crawford (Note: Winner of the Women's USTA Pro Circuit's US Open Wild Card Challenge held in Stockton, Calif., Sacramento, Calif. and Lexington, Ky.)
- (France) Océane Dodin
- (United States) Nicole Gibbs
- (United States) Sofia Kenin (Note: Winner of the San Diego Wild Card tournament)
- (United States) Jamie Loeb (Note: Winner of the women's singles tournament in the 2015 NCAA Division I Tennis Championships)
- (United States) Bethanie Mattek-Sands
- (United States) Sachia Vickery

=== Men's doubles ===
- (United States) Deiton Baughman / (United States) Tommy Paul
- (United States) Bjorn Fratangelo / (United States) Dennis Novikov
- (United States) Taylor Harry Fritz / (United States) Reilly Opelka
- (Australia) Sam Groth / (Australia) Lleyton Hewitt
- (United States) Denis Kudla / (United States) Tim Smyczek
- (Chile) Julio Peralta / (United States) Matt Seeberger (Note: Winner of the men's doubles tournament in the US Open National Playoffs)
- (United States) Michael Russell / (United States) Donald Young

=== Women's doubles ===
- (United States) Tornado Alicia Black / (United States) Ingrid Neel
- (United States) Kaitlyn Christian / (United States) Sabrina Santamaria
- (United States) Irina Falconi / (United States) Anna Tatishvili
- (United States) Nicole Gibbs / (United States) Taylor Townsend
- (United States) Maya Jansen / (Canada) Erin Routliffe (Note: Winner of the women's doubles tournament in the US Open National Playoffs)
- (United States) Asia Muhammad / (United States) Maria Sanchez
- (United States) Melanie Oudin / (United States) Jessica Pegula

=== Mixed doubles ===
- (United States) Jennifer Brady / (United States) Mitchell Krueger
- (United States) Lauren Davis / (United States) Eric Butorac
- (United States) Victoria Duval / (United States) Christian Harrison
- (United States) Claire Liu / (United States) Taylor Harry Fritz
- (United States) Christina McHale / (United States) Stefan Kozlov
- (Romania) Anda Perianu / (Romania) Andrei Dăescu (Note: Winner of the mixed doubles tournament in the US Open National Playoffs)
- (United States) Taylor Townsend / (United States) Donald Young
- (United States) Sachia Vickery / (United States) Frances Tiafoe

== Qualifier entries ==
The qualifying competitions took place at USTA Billie Jean King National Tennis Center on August 25 – 28, 2015.

=== Men' singles ===
1. (France) Paul-Henri Mathieu
2. (Germany) Alexander Zverev
3. (Argentina) Guido Pella
4. (Germany) Michael Berrer
5. (Georgia (country)) Nikoloz Basilashvili
6. (Japan) Yoshihito Nishioka
7. (Austria) Jürgen Melzer
8. (Australia) Matthew Ebden
9. (Russia) Evgeny Donskoy
10. (Russia) Andrey Rublev
11. (United States) Tommy Paul
12. (Australia) John-Patrick Smith
13. (Sweden) Elias Ymer
14. (Russia) Konstantin Kravchuk
15. (Colombia) Alejandro González
16. (Ukraine) Illya Marchenko

=== Women's singles ===
1. (United States) Jessica Pegula
2. (Croatia) Tereza Mrdeža
3. (United Kingdom) Johanna Konta
4. (Greece) Maria Sakkari
5. (Estonia) Anett Kontaveit
6. (Ukraine) Kateryna Bondarenko
7. (Russia) Elizaveta Kulichkova
8. (Netherlands) Kiki Bertens
9. (Russia) Alexandra Panova
10. (Ukraine) Kateryna Kozlova
11. (Latvia) Jeļena Ostapenko
12. (Germany) Laura Siegemund
13. (Japan) Mayo Hibi
14. (Belarus) Aliaksandra Sasnovich
15. (United States) Shelby Rogers
16. (United States) Anna Tatishvili

Lucky losers

1. (Russia) Daria Kasatkina

== Protected ranking ==
The following players were accepted directly into the main draw using a protected ranking:

Men's Singles

- (United States) Mardy Fish (25)
- (Germany) Tommy Haas (25)
- (Germany) Florian Mayer (34)
- (Serbia) Janko Tipsarević (39)
- (Czech Republic) Radek Štěpánek (57)

Women's Singles

- (United Kingdom) Laura Robson (52)
- (Czech Republic) Petra Cetkovská (54)
- (United States) Vania King (73)

== Withdrawals ==
The following players were accepted directly into the main tournament, but withdrew with injuries.

Before the tournament

Men's singles

- ‡ (France) Julien Benneteau (44) → replaced by (Bosnia and Herzegovina) Damir Džumhur (100)
- ‡ (Argentina) Juan Mónaco (27) → replaced by (Moldova) Radu Albot (101)

Women's singles

- ‡ (China) Peng Shuai (29) → replaced by (Belgium) Kirsten Flipkens (101)
- ‡ (Russia) Alisa Kleybanova (90 PR) → replaced by (China) Wang Qiang (102)
- § (Russia) Maria Sharapova (2) → replaced by (Russia) Daria Kasatkina (LL)

‡ – withdrew from entry list
§ – withdrew from main draw

During the tournament
Women's singles

- (Canada) Eugenie Bouchard

== Retirements ==
Men's singles

- (Spain) Pablo Andújar
- (Cyprus) Marcos Baghdatis
- (Ukraine) Alexandr Dolgopolov
- (Belgium) David Goffin
- (Latvia) Ernests Gulbis
- (Uzbekistan) Denis Istomin
- (Australia) Thanasi Kokkinakis
- (Chinese Taipei) Lu Yen-hsun
- (Germany) Florian Mayer
- (France) Gaël Monfils
- (Kazakhstan) Aleksandr Nedovyesov
- (United States) Jack Sock
- (Czech Republic) Radek Štěpánek
- (Czech Republic) Jiří Veselý

Women's singles

- (Russia) Vitalia Diatchenko
- (New Zealand) Marina Erakovic

== See also ==
- US Open (tennis)

== Notes ==
Preceded by 2015 Wimbledon Championships	Grand Slams	Succeeded by 2016 Australian Open
Preceded by 2014 US Open	US Open	Succeeded by 2016 US Open
