= Vasileios Iliopoulos =

Greek tennis player (born 1998)

Vasileios Iliopoulos (born 30 June 1998) is a Greek tennis player.

Iliopoulos has competed in the ATP and ITF singles and doubles circuit and has a career high ITF singles ranking of 270, achieved on 4 January 2016. Iliopoulos has won one ITF juniors singles and 4 doubles titles.

Playing for Greece in the Davis Cup, Iliopoulos has a win-loss record of 3–2.
