= 2014 QNet Open =

- Date: 17–23 November
- Edition: 1st
- Category: ITF Women's Circuit
- Prize money: $50,000
- Surface: Hard
- Location: New Delhi, India
- Venue: DLTA Complex

Champions

Singles
- (Serbia) Ivana Jorović

Doubles
- (China) Liu Chang / (China) Lu Jiajing
QNet Open

The 2014 QNet Open was a professional tennis tournament played on outdoor hard courts. It was the first and last edition of the QNet Open and was part of the 2014 ITF Women's Circuit, offering a total of $50,000 in prize money. It took place in New Delhi, India, on 17–23 November 2014.

== Singles entrants ==
=== Seeds ===
Country	Player	Rank^{1}	Seed
AUT	Patricia Mayr-Achleitner	107	1
UKR	Anastasiya Vasylyeva	174	2
RUS	Marina Melnikova	209	3
SLO	Tadeja Majerič	216	4
SWE	~~Susanne Celik~~	~~255~~	~~5~~
UZB	Sabina Sharipova	260	6
BEL	Elise Mertens	265	7
UKR	Sofiya Kovalets	280	8

- ^{1} Rankings as of 10 November 2014

=== Other entrants ===
The following players received wildcards into the singles main draw:

- (India) Prerna Bhambri
- (India) Bhuvana Kalva
- (India) Natasha Palha
- (India) Sharon Sanchana Paul

The following players received entry from the qualifying draw:

- (Thailand) Kamonwan Buayam
- (India) Shweta Rana
- (India) Rishika Sunkara
- (China) Wang Xiyao

The following player received entry into the singles main draw as a lucky loser:

- (India) Vaniya Dangwal

== Champions ==
=== Singles ===
- (Serbia) Ivana Jorović def. (Austria) Barbara Haas 6–2, 6–2

=== Doubles ===
- (China) Liu Chang / (China) Lu Jiajing def. (Russia) Marina Melnikova / (Belgium) Elise Mertens 6–3, 6–0
