= 2014 QNet Open – Singles =

Singles
- 2014 QNet Open

Final
- Champion: (Serbia) Ivana Jorović
- Runner-up: (Austria) Barbara Haas
- Score: 6–2, 6–2

Events
Singles	Doubles
QNet Open

The tournament in New Delhi was a new addition to the ITF Women's Circuit.

Ivana Jorović won the title, defeating Barbara Haas in the final, 6–2, 6–2.

== Seeds ==
1. (Austria) Patricia Mayr-Achleitner (quarterfinals)
2. (Ukraine) Anastasiya Vasylyeva (semifinals)
3. (Russia) Marina Melnikova (quarterfinals)
4. (Slovenia) Tadeja Majerič (first round)
5. (Sweden) ~~Susanne Celik~~ (withdrew)
6. (Uzbekistan) Sabina Sharipova (quarterfinals)
7. (Belgium) Elise Mertens (semifinals)
8. (Ukraine) Sofiya Kovalets (first round)

== Main draw ==
=== Key ===
- Q = Qualifier
- WC = Wild card
- LL = Lucky loser
- Alt = Alternate
- SE = Special exempt
- PR = Protected ranking
- ITF = ITF entry
- JE = Junior exempt
- w/o = Walkover
- r = Retired
- d = Defaulted
- SR = Special ranking

=== Finals ===
Semifinals
(Austria) Barbara Haas	6	4	6
7	(Belgium) Elise Mertens	4	6	1
(Serbia) Ivana Jorović	4	6	6
2	(Ukraine) Anastasiya Vasylyeva	6	3	2

Final
(Austria) Barbara Haas	2	2
(Serbia) Ivana Jorović	6	6

=== Top half ===
First round
1	(Austria) P Mayr-Achleitner	6	6
(United Kingdom) E Webley-Smith	2	3
(Romania) D Negreanu	5	3
(Russia) M Lazareva	7	6
(Thailand) P Plipuech	4	0
(France) H Tan	6	6
(Austria) B Haas	0	7^{8}	7
8	(Ukraine) S Kovalets	6	6^{6}	5
3	(Russia) M Melnikova	4	6	6
Q	(China) X Wang	6	3	3
(India) A Raina	6	6
(Oman) F Al-Nabhani	2	2
WC	(India) N Palha	1	3
(Greece) M Sakkari	6	6
Q	(Thailand) K Buayam	0	1
7	(Belgium) E Mertens	6	6

Second round
1	(Austria) P Mayr-Achleitner	6	6
(Russia) M Lazareva	4	3
(France) H Tan	6	4	0^{r}
(Austria) B Haas	3	6	2
3	(Russia) M Melnikova	6	6
(India) A Raina	4	4
(Greece) M Sakkari	3	1
7	(Belgium) E Mertens	6	6

Quarterfinals
1	(Austria) P Mayr-Achleitner	3	6^{3}
(Austria) B Haas	6	7^{7}
3	(Russia) M Melnikova	6	5	2
7	(Belgium) E Mertens	3	7	6

Semifinals
(Austria) B Haas	6	4	6
7	(Belgium) E Mertens	4	6	1

=== Bottom half ===
First round
LL	(India) V Dangwal	2	1
(Thailand) N Lertpitaksinchai	6	6
Q	(India) R Sunkara	6	6
Q	(India) S Rana	2	0
(United Kingdom) T Moore	6	6
(Chinese Taipei) C-w Hsu	3	3
(Serbia) I Jorović	7	6
4	(Slovenia) T Majerič	5	0
6	(Uzbekistan) S Sharipova	6	6
(India) P Thombare	2	1
(China) C Liu	6^{3}	1
(China) J Lu	7^{7}	6
WC	(India) P Bhambri	6	6
WC	(India) SS Paul	4	2
WC	(India) B Kalva	3	6^{5}
2	(Ukraine) A Vasylyeva	6	7^{7}

Second round
(Thailand) N Lertpitaksinchai	4	6	6
Q	(India) R Sunkara	6	0	1
(United Kingdom) T Moore	5	2
(Serbia) I Jorović	7	6
6	(Uzbekistan) S Sharipova	3	6	7^{7}
(China) J Lu	6	4	6^{2}
WC	(India) P Bhambri	2	4
2	(Ukraine) A Vasylyeva	6	6

Quarterfinals
(Thailand) N Lertpitaksinchai	6^{3}	0
(Serbia) I Jorović	7^{7}	6
6	(Uzbekistan) S Sharipova	3	4
2	(Ukraine) A Vasylyeva	6	6

Semifinals
(Serbia) I Jorović	4	6	6
2	(Ukraine) A Vasylyeva	6	3	2
