= 2014 QNet Open – Doubles =

Doubles
- 2014 QNet Open

Final
- Champions: (China) Liu Chang (China) Lu Jiajing
- Runners-up: (Russia) Marina Melnikova (Belgium) Elise Mertens
- Score: 6–3, 6–0

Events
Singles	Doubles
QNet Open

The tournament in New Delhi was a new addition to the ITF Women's Circuit.

Liu Chang and Lu Jiajing won the title, defeating Marina Melnikova and Elise Mertens in the final, 6–3, 6–0.

== Seeds ==
1. (Thailand) Nicha Lertpitaksinchai / (Thailand) Peangtarn Plipuech (semifinals)
2. (Russia) Marina Melnikova / (Belgium) Elise Mertens (final)
3. (Russia) Margarita Lazareva / (Ukraine) Anastasiya Vasylyeva (semifinals)
4. (China) Liu Chang / (China) Lu Jiajing (champions)

== Draw ==
=== Key ===
- Q = Qualifier
- WC = Wild card
- LL = Lucky loser
- Alt = Alternate
- SE = Special exempt
- PR = Protected ranking
- ITF = ITF entry
- JE = Junior exempt
- w/o = Walkover
- r = Retired
- d = Defaulted
- SR = Special ranking

First round
1	(Thailand) N Lertpitaksinchai (Thailand) Pe Plipuech	6	6
WC	(India) V Dangwal (Pakistan) U Suhail	0	0
(India) P Thombare (United Kingdom) E Webley-Smith	6	6
WC	(India) H Mor (India) V Sawhney	2	0
4	(China) C Liu (China) J Lu	7^{7}	2	[10]
(India) B Kalva (India) N Palha	6^{5}	6	[8]
(Serbia) I Jorović (Ukraine) S Kovalets	3	6	[5]
(Thailand) K Buayam (Uzbekistan) S Sharipova	6	1	[10]
(India) P Bhambri (Romania) D Negreanu	1	6^{6}
(Chinese Taipei) C-w Hsu (China) X Wang	6	7^{8}
WC	(India) R Bhatia (India) SS Paul	2	0
3	(Russia) M Lazareva (Ukraine) A Vasylyeva	6	6
(India) SS Chamarthi (Hong Kong) H-c Wu	6^{4}	3
(India) A Andrady (India) R Sunkara	7^{7}	6
(Oman) F Al-Nabhani (India) A Raina	2	7^{7}	[3]
2	(Russia) M Melnikova (Belgium) E Mertens	6	6^{5}	[10]

Quarterfinals
1	(Thailand) N Lertpitaksinchai (Thailand) Pe Plipuech	7	7^{7}
(India) P Thombare (United Kingdom) E Webley-Smith	5	6^{4}
4	(China) C Liu (China) J Lu	7^{7}	6
(Thailand) K Buayam (Uzbekistan) S Sharipova	6^{3}	1
(Chinese Taipei) C-w Hsu (China) X Wang	4	2
3	(Russia) M Lazareva (Ukraine) A Vasylyeva	6	6
(India) A Andrady (India) R Sunkara	1	1
2	(Russia) M Melnikova (Belgium) E Mertens	6	6

Semifinals
1	(Thailand) N Lertpitaksinchai (Thailand) Pe Plipuech	6	4	[6]
4	(China) C Liu (China) J Lu	1	6	[10]
3	(Russia) M Lazareva (Ukraine) A Vasylyeva	4	3
2	(Russia) M Melnikova (Belgium) E Mertens	6	6

Final
4	(China) C Liu (China) J Lu	6	6
2	(Russia) M Melnikova (Belgium) E Mertens	3	0
