= 2014 ITF Women's Circuit – Xi'an =

- Date: 23–29 June
- Edition: 1st
- Category: ITF Women's Circuit
- Prize money: $50,000
- Surface: Hard
- Location: Xi'an, China

Champions

Singles
- (China) Duan Yingying

Doubles
- (China) Lu Jiajing / (China) Wang Yafan
ITF Women's Circuit – Xi'an	· 2015 →

The 2014 ITF Women's Circuit – Xi'an was a professional tennis tournament played on outdoor hard courts. It was the first edition of the tournament which was part of the 2014 ITF Women's Circuit, offering a total of $50,000 in prize money. It took place in Xi'an, China, on 23–29 June 2014.

== Singles main draw entrants ==
=== Seeds ===
Country	Player	Rank^{1}	Seed
JPN	Eri Hozumi	168	1
CHN	Wang Qiang	193	2
JPN	Miharu Imanishi	204	3
CHN	Duan Yingying	206	4
THA	Noppawan Lertcheewakarn	215	5
JPN	Hiroko Kuwata	249	6
JPN	Nao Hibino	251	7
SRB	Doroteja Erić	252	8

- ^{1} Rankings as of 16 June 2014

=== Other entrants ===
The following players received wildcards into the singles main draw:

- (China) Liu Mingyang
- (China) You Xiaodi
- (Hong Kong) Zhang Ling
- (China) Zhu Lin

The following players received entry from the qualifying draw:

- (China) Tian Ran
- (China) Xun Fangying
- (China) Yang Zhaoxuan
- (China) Zhang Kailin

== Champions ==
=== Singles ===
- (China) Duan Yingying def. (China) Zhu Lin 4–6, 7–6^{(11–9)}, 6–4

=== Doubles ===
- (China) Lu Jiajing / (China) Wang Yafan def. (China) Liang Chen / (China) Yang Zhaoxuan 6–3, 7–6^{(7–2)}
