= 2014 ITF Women's Circuit – Xi'an – Singles =

Xi'an – Singles
- 2014 ITF Women's Circuit – Xi'an

Final
- Champion: (China) Duan Yingying
- Runner-up: (China) Zhu Lin
- Score: 4–6, 7–6^{(11–9)}, 6–4

Events
Singles	Doubles
← 2013 ·	ITF Women's Circuit – Xi'an	· 2015 →

The tournament in Xi'an is a new addition to the ITF Women's Circuit.

Fourth seed Duan Yingying won the title, defeating wildcard Zhu Lin in the final, 4–6, 7–6^{(11–9)}, 6–4.

== Seeds ==
1. (Japan) Eri Hozumi (second round)
2. (China) Wang Qiang (second round)
3. (Japan) Miharu Imanishi (first round)
4. (China) Duan Yingying (champion)
5. (Thailand) Noppawan Lertcheewakarn (first round)
6. (Japan) Hiroko Kuwata (semifinals)
7. (Japan) Nao Hibino (second round)
8. (Serbia) Doroteja Erić (first round)

== Main draw ==
=== Key ===
- Q = Qualifier
- WC = Wild card
- LL = Lucky loser
- Alt = Alternate
- SE = Special exempt
- PR = Protected ranking
- ITF = ITF entry
- JE = Junior exempt
- w/o = Walkover
- r = Retired
- d = Defaulted
- SR = Special ranking

=== Finals ===
Semifinals
WC	(China) Zhu Lin	6	6
(Japan) Junri Namigata	3	1
4	(China) Duan Yingying	6	6
6	(Japan) Hiroko Kuwata	3	2

Final
WC	(China) Zhu Lin	6	6^{9}	4
4	(China) Duan Yingying	4	7^{11}	6

=== Top half ===
First round
1	(Japan) E Hozumi	6	6
(China) F Liu	4	3
(South Korea) M Yoo	2	5
WC	(China) L Zhu	6	7
Q	(China) K Zhang	6	6
Q	(China) Z Yang	1	4
(Japan) R Sawayanagi	6	6
5	(Thailand) N Lertcheewakarn	3	1
3	(Japan) M Imanishi	2	6	3
(China) H Tang	6	3	6
(Japan) J Namigata	6	6
(Serbia) B Bonić	4	0
(Chinese Taipei) C-w Chan	6	6^{11}	2
WC	(China) X You	4	7^{13}	6
(China) Y Xu	6	6
8	(Serbia) D Erić	2	4

Second round
1	(Japan) E Hozumi	6	3	5
WC	(China) L Zhu	3	6	7
Q	(China) K Zhang	2	2
(Japan) R Sawayanagi	6	6
(China) H Tang	6^{4}	1
(Japan) J Namigata	7^{7}	6
WC	(China) X You	6	2	2
(China) Y Xu	1	6	6

Quarterfinals
WC	(China) L Zhu	6	6
(Japan) R Sawayanagi	1	0
(Japan) J Namigata	6	6
(China) Y Xu	3	2

Semifinals
WC	(China) L Zhu	6	6
(Japan) J Namigata	3	1

=== Bottom half ===
First round
7	(Japan) N Hibino	6	6
Q	(China) R Tian	1	2
(South Korea) N-l Han	6	7^{7}
(China) J Lu	1	6^{2}
(China) Y Zhang	2	6	6
(Japan) M Inoue	6	1	4
(China) Y Wang	4	6^{5}
4	(China) Y Duan	6	7^{7}
6	(Japan) H Kuwata	6	6
(China) X Han	2	2
WC	(China) M Liu	3	2
(India) A Raina	6	6
WC	(Hong Kong) L Zhang	6	7^{7}
Q	(China) F Xun	1	6^{3}
(Japan) M Tanaka	2	4
2	(China) Q Wang	6	6

Second round
7	(Japan) N Hibino	2	3
(South Korea) N-l Han	6	6
(China) Y Zhang	6	2	1
4	(China) Y Duan	4	6	6
6	(Japan) H Kuwata	6	6
(India) A Raina	1	0
WC	(Hong Kong) L Zhang	7	4	7
2	(China) Q Wang	5	6	5

Quarterfinals
(South Korea) N-l Han	4	1
4	(China) Y Duan	6	6
6	(Japan) H Kuwata	7^{7}	7
WC	(Hong Kong) L Zhang	6^{3}	5

Semifinals
4	(China) Y Duan	6	6
6	(Japan) H Kuwata	3	2
