= 2017 US Open – Women's singles qualifying =

Women's singles qualifying
- 2017 US Open

Events
| Singles | men | women | | boys | girls |
| Doubles | men | women | mixed | boys | girls |
| WC Singles | men | women | quad |
| WC Doubles | men | women | quad |
| Legends | men | women | mixed |

Qualification
| Singles | men | women |
- US Open

== Seeds ==
1. (Chinese Taipei) Hsieh Su-wei (qualifying competition)
2. (Belgium) Maryna Zanevska (first round)
3. (Montenegro) Danka Kovinić (second round)
4. (Colombia) Mariana Duque Mariño (qualifying competition)
5. (Kazakhstan) Zarina Diyas (first round)
6. (Ukraine) Kateryna Bondarenko (second round)
7. (Belarus) Aryna Sabalenka (first round)
8. (China) Zhu Lin (second round)
9. (United States) Kristie Ahn (second round)
10. (Ukraine) Kateryna Kozlova (qualified)
11. (Russia) Anna Blinkova (qualified)
12. (Canada) Françoise Abanda (qualifying competition)
13. (China) Wang Yafan (second round)
14. (United States) Nicole Gibbs (qualified)
15. (Czech Republic) Tereza Martincová (qualified)
16. (Czech Republic) Barbora Krejčíková (first round)
17. (China) Han Xinyun (first round)
18. (United Kingdom) Naomi Broady (qualifying competition)
19. (Romania) Patricia Maria Țig (first round)
20. (Croatia) Jana Fett (qualifying competition)
21. (Italy) Jasmine Paolini (second round)
22. (Romania) Mihaela Buzărnescu (qualified)
23. (Slovakia) Viktória Kužmová (qualified)
24. (United States) Asia Muhammad (first round)
25. (Germany) Tamara Korpatsch (first round)
26. (Netherlands) Arantxa Rus (first round)
27. (South Korea) Jang Su-jeong (qualifying competition)
28. (Hungary) Dalma Gálfi (first round)
29. (Italy) Martina Trevisan (second round)
30. (United States) Louisa Chirico (second round)
31. (United States) Bernarda Pera (qualifying competition)
32. (Russia) Sofya Zhuk (qualified)

== Qualifiers ==
1. (Estonia) Kaia Kanepi
2. (Germany) Anna Zaja
3. (Turkey) İpek Soylu
4. (Romania) Mihaela Buzărnescu
5. (Sweden) Rebecca Peterson
6. (United States) Sachia Vickery
7. (United States) Danielle Lao
8. (United States) Claire Liu
9. (Russia) Sofya Zhuk
10. (Ukraine) Kateryna Kozlova
11. (Russia) Anna Blinkova
12. (Slovakia) Viktória Kužmová
13. (United States) Allie Kiick
14. (United States) Nicole Gibbs
15. (Czech Republic) Tereza Martincová
16. (Netherlands) Lesley Kerkhove

== Qualifying draw ==
=== First qualifier ===
First round
1 | (Chinese Taipei) Hsieh Su-wei | 3 | 6 | 7^{7}
WC | (United States) Kelly Chen | 6 | 2 | 6^{3}
(Germany) Katharina Hobgarski | 5 | 1
(Czech Republic) Lucie Hradecká | 7 | 6
(Serbia) Nina Stojanović | 2 | 2
PR | (Estonia) Kaia Kanepi | 6 | 6
(United States) Samantha Crawford | 3 | 7 | 2
30 | (United States) Louisa Chirico | 6 | 5 | 6

Second round
1 | (Chinese Taipei) Hsieh Su-wei | 6 | 6
(Czech Republic) Lucie Hradecká | 1 | 2
PR | (Estonia) Kaia Kanepi | 5 | 7 | 6
30 | (United States) Louisa Chirico | 7 | 5 | 2

Qualifying competition
1 | (Chinese Taipei) Hsieh Su-wei | 2 | 4
PR | (Estonia) Kaia Kanepi | 6 | 6

=== Second qualifier ===
First round
2 | (Belgium) Maryna Zanevska | 6 | 5 | 4
(United States) Jacqueline Cako | 2 | 7 | 6
(Germany) Anna Zaja | 6 | 6
(Netherlands) Quirine Lemoine | 4 | 1
(Russia) Alla Kudryavtseva | 6 | 6
(United Kingdom) Laura Robson | 2 | 4
(Uzbekistan) Sabina Sharipova | 6 | 4 | 0
27 | (South Korea) Jang Su-jeong | 4 | 6 | 6

Second round
(United States) Jacqueline Cako | 6^{1} | 1
(Germany) Anna Zaja | 7^{7} | 6
(Russia) Alla Kudryavtseva | 5 | 2
27 | (South Korea) Jang Su-jeong | 7 | 6

Qualifying competition
(Germany) Anna Zaja | 6 | 5 | 6
27 | (South Korea) Jang Su-jeong | 4 | 7 | 4

=== Third qualifier ===
First round
3 | (Montenegro) Danka Kovinić | 6 | 3 | 7
(Switzerland) Conny Perrin | 1 | 6 | 5
(United Kingdom) Katie Boulter | 6 | 6
(United States) Danielle Collins | 4 | 0
(Turkey) İpek Soylu | 6 | 0 | 6
(United States) Amanda Anisimova | 2 | 6 | 0
(Australia) Lizette Cabrera | 6 | 6
25 | (Germany) Tamara Korpatsch | 2 | 1

Second round
3 | (Montenegro) Danka Kovinić | 4 | 6 | 4
(United Kingdom) Katie Boulter | 6 | 2 | 6
(Turkey) İpek Soylu | 6 | 6
(Australia) Lizette Cabrera | 3 | 0

Qualifying competition
(United Kingdom) Katie Boulter | 7^{7} | 2 | 2
(Turkey) İpek Soylu | 6^{5} | 6 | 6

=== Fourth qualifier ===
First round
4 | (Colombia) Mariana Duque Mariño | 7^{9} | 4 | 6
(Liechtenstein) Kathinka von Deichmann | 6^{7} | 6 | 4
PR | (United States) Alexa Glatch | 6 | 7
(Russia) Elizaveta Kulichkova | 3 | 5
(Poland) Katarzyna Piter | 1 | 6 | 3
(United States) Grace Min | 6 | 3 | 6
(Czech Republic) Marie Bouzková | 6 | 2 | 2
22 | (Romania) Mihaela Buzărnescu | 4 | 6 | 6

Second round
4 | (Colombia) Mariana Duque Mariño | 6 | 6
PR | (United States) Alexa Glatch | 4 | 3
(United States) Grace Min | 3 | 3
22 | (Romania) Mihaela Buzărnescu | 6 | 6

Qualifying competition
4 | (Colombia) Mariana Duque Mariño | 7^{7} | 2 | 4
22 | (Romania) Mihaela Buzărnescu | 6^{4} | 6 | 6

=== Fifth qualifier ===
First round
5 | (Kazakhstan) Zarina Diyas | 6^{2} | 5
(Sweden) Rebecca Peterson | 7^{7} | 7
(North Macedonia) Lina Gjorcheska | 6 | 4 | 3
(Australia) Destanee Aiava | 4 | 6 | 6
(China) Lu Jiajing | 6 | 3 | 3
(Japan) Miyu Kato | 3 | 6 | 6
(Romania) Alexandra Cadanțu | 3 | 3
21 | (Italy) Jasmine Paolini | 6 | 6

Second round
(Sweden) Rebecca Peterson | 6 | 6
(Australia) Destanee Aiava | 3 | 3
(Japan) Miyu Kato | 6 | 6
21 | (Italy) Jasmine Paolini | 4 | 0

Qualifying competition
(Sweden) Rebecca Peterson | 6^{4} | 6 | 6
(Japan) Miyu Kato | 7^{7} | 3 | 4

=== Sixth qualifier ===
First round
6 | (Ukraine) Kateryna Bondarenko | 6 | 6
(Spain) Sílvia Soler Espinosa | 2 | 2
(Russia) Veronika Kudermetova | 2 | 1
(United States) Sachia Vickery | 6 | 6
(United States) Jamie Loeb | 6 | 6
(South Korea) Han Na-lae | 4 | 2
PR | (Russia) Vera Zvonareva | 7^{7} | 6
17 | (China) Han Xinyun | 6^{4} | 1

Second round
6 | (Ukraine) Kateryna Bondarenko | 1 | 4
(United States) Sachia Vickery | 6 | 6
(United States) Jamie Loeb | 7^{7} | 5 | 6
PR | (Russia) Vera Zvonareva | 6^{4} | 7 | 4

Qualifying competition
(United States) Sachia Vickery | 6 | 6
(United States) Jamie Loeb | 3 | 4

=== Seventh qualifier ===
First round
7 | (Belarus) Aryna Sabalenka | 7 | 4 | 3
(Italy) Camilla Rosatello | 5 | 6 | 6
PR | (China) Xu Shilin | 3 | 6 | 0
(United States) Danielle Lao | 6 | 2 | 6
(Czech Republic) Tereza Smitková | 0 | 5
(Austria) Barbara Haas | 6 | 7
(Paraguay) Montserrat González | 3 | 7 | 2
20 | (Croatia) Jana Fett | 6 | 5 | 6

Second round
(Italy) Camilla Rosatello | 3 | 1
(United States) Danielle Lao | 6 | 6
(Austria) Barbara Haas | 4 | 6 | 1
20 | (Croatia) Jana Fett | 6 | 2 | 6

Qualifying competition
(United States) Danielle Lao | 1 | 6 | 6
20 | (Croatia) Jana Fett | 6 | 1 | 2

=== Eighth qualifier ===
First round
8 | (China) Zhu Lin | 6 | 6
(Japan) Eri Hozumi | 4 | 4
(Russia) Viktoria Kamenskaya | 6 | 7
WC | (United States) Ann Li | 4 | 5
(United States) Caroline Dolehide | 1 | 2
WC | (United States) Claire Liu | 6 | 6
(Bulgaria) Sesil Karatantcheva | 6 | 6
26 | (Netherlands) Arantxa Rus | 2 | 2

Second round
8 | (China) Zhu Lin | 4 | 2
(Russia) Viktoria Kamenskaya | 6 | 6
WC | (United States) Claire Liu | 4 | 6 | 7^{7}
(Bulgaria) Sesil Karatantcheva | 6 | 4 | 6^{3}

Qualifying competition
(Russia) Viktoria Kamenskaya | 3 | 1
WC | (United States) Claire Liu | 6 | 6

=== Ninth qualifier ===
First round
9 | (United States) Kristie Ahn | 6 | 7
WC | (United States) Katerina Stewart | 4 | 5
(Canada) Bianca Andreescu | 2 | 6 | 6^{4}
(China) Liu Fangzhou | 6 | 2 | 7^{7}
(Russia) Anna Kalinskaya | 5 | 1
(Japan) Junri Namigata | 7 | 6
WC | (United States) Ashley Lahey | 0 | 5
32 | (Russia) Sofya Zhuk | 6 | 7

Second round
9 | (United States) Kristie Ahn | 3 | 5
(China) Liu Fangzhou | 6 | 7
(Japan) Junri Namigata | 1 | 6^{4}
32 | (Russia) Sofya Zhuk | 6 | 7^{7}

Qualifying competition
(China) Liu Fangzhou | 3 | 2
32 | (Russia) Sofya Zhuk | 6 | 6

=== Tenth qualifier ===
First round
10 | (Ukraine) Kateryna Kozlova | 6 | 6
(France) Chloé Paquet | 0 | 1
(New Zealand) Marina Erakovic | 4 | 2
(Hungary) Fanny Stollár | 6 | 6
(Russia) Polina Monova | 3 | 6 | 4
WC | (United States) Caty McNally | 6 | 2 | 6
(Slovakia) Anna Karolína Schmiedlová | 2 | 6 | 6
28 | (Hungary) Dalma Gálfi | 6 | 2 | 4

Second round
10 | (Ukraine) Kateryna Kozlova | 6 | 6
(Hungary) Fanny Stollár | 2 | 3
WC | (United States) Caty McNally | 0 | 2
(Slovakia) Anna Karolína Schmiedlová | 6 | 6

Qualifying competition
10 | (Ukraine) Kateryna Kozlova | 6^{1} | 6 | 6
(Slovakia) Anna Karolína Schmiedlová | 7^{7} | 4 | 1

=== Eleventh qualifier ===
First round
11 | (Russia) Anna Blinkova | 6 | 6
WC | (United States) Whitney Osuigwe | 4 | 3
(Russia) Ksenia Lykina | 2 | 6 | 3
(Ukraine) Anhelina Kalinina | 6 | 1 | 6
(France) Myrtille Georges | 5 | 6 | 0^{r}
(Romania) Irina Bara | 7 | 2 | 3
(China) Lu Jingjing | 4 | 7 | 4
31 | (United States) Bernarda Pera | 6 | 5 | 6

Second round
11 | (Russia) Anna Blinkova | 6 | 1 | 6
(Ukraine) Anhelina Kalinina | 3 | 6 | 0
(Romania) Irina Bara | 3 | 4
31 | (United States) Bernarda Pera | 6 | 6

Qualifying competition
11 | (Russia) Anna Blinkova | 6 | 7^{7}
31 | (United States) Bernarda Pera | 1 | 6^{4}

=== Twelfth qualifier ===
First round
12 | (Canada) Françoise Abanda | 6 | 3 | 7^{7}
PR | (Russia) Alexandra Panova | 3 | 6 | 6^{4}
(Japan) Mayo Hibi | 2 | 4
(Germany) Antonia Lottner | 6 | 6
(Turkey) Başak Eraydın | 6^{4} | 6 | 6
PR | (Germany) Dinah Pfizenmaier | 7^{7} | 4 | 3
(United States) Usue Maitane Arconada | 1 | 1
23 | (Slovakia) Viktória Kužmová | 6 | 6

Second round
12 | (Canada) Françoise Abanda | 6 | 6
(Germany) Antonia Lottner | 4 | 2
(Turkey) Başak Eraydın | 3 | 1
23 | (Slovakia) Viktória Kužmová | 6 | 6

Qualifying competition
12 | (Canada) Françoise Abanda | 3 | 4
23 | (Slovakia) Viktória Kužmová | 6 | 6

=== Thirteenth qualifier ===
First round
13 | (China) Wang Yafan | 5 | 6 | 6
(China) Gao Xinyu | 7 | 0 | 2
(Slovenia) Dalila Jakupović | 2 | 4
WC | (United States) Victoria Duval | 6 | 6
PR | (United States) Allie Kiick | 6 | 2 | 6
(Ukraine) Olga Ianchuk | 1 | 6 | 4
(Japan) Riko Sawayanagi | 2 | 7^{9} | 6
24 | (United States) Asia Muhammad | 6 | 6^{7} | 3

Second round
13 | (China) Wang Yafan | 6 | 4 | 4
WC | (United States) Victoria Duval | 2 | 6 | 6
PR | (United States) Allie Kiick | 6 | 6
(Japan) Riko Sawayanagi | 4 | 3

Qualifying competition
WC | (United States) Victoria Duval | 3 | 0^{r}
PR | (United States) Allie Kiick | 6 | 1

=== Fourteenth qualifier ===
First round
14 | (United States) Nicole Gibbs | 7^{7} | 7
WC | (United States) Francesca Di Lorenzo | 6^{0} | 5
PR | (Belgium) Ysaline Bonaventure | 3 | 6 | 1
(Switzerland) Patty Schnyder | 6 | 3 | 6
(Serbia) Ivana Jorović | 2 | 5
(Turkey) Çağla Büyükakçay | 6 | 7
(Switzerland) Jil Teichmann | 2 | 6 | 1
18 | (United Kingdom) Naomi Broady | 6 | 4 | 6

Second round
14 | (United States) Nicole Gibbs | 6 | 1 | 6
(Switzerland) Patty Schnyder | 3 | 6 | 4
(Turkey) Çağla Büyükakçay | 5 | 7^{7} | 4
18 | (United Kingdom) Naomi Broady | 7 | 6^{3} | 6

Qualifying competition
14 | (United States) Nicole Gibbs | 6 | 4 | 6
18 | (United Kingdom) Naomi Broady | 4 | 6 | 2

=== Fifteenth qualifier ===
First round
15 | (Czech Republic) Tereza Martincová | 4 | 7^{7} | 6
(Greece) Valentini Grammatikopoulou | 6 | 6^{3} | 4
(Chile) Daniela Seguel | 3 | 6 | 3
(Belarus) Vera Lapko | 6 | 3 | 6
(Switzerland) Stefanie Vögele | 6 | 7^{7}
PR | (United States) Jessica Pegula | 3 | 6^{2}
(Italy) Georgia Brescia | 7^{13} | 1 | 6
19 | (Romania) Patricia Maria Țig | 6^{11} | 6 | 2

Second round
15 | (Czech Republic) Tereza Martincová | 6 | 6
(Belarus) Vera Lapko | 3 | 4
(Switzerland) Stefanie Vögele | 4 | 2^{r}
(Italy) Georgia Brescia | 6 | 4

Qualifying competition
15 | (Czech Republic) Tereza Martincová | 7 | 6
(Italy) Georgia Brescia | 5 | 4

=== Sixteenth qualifier ===
First round
16 | (Czech Republic) Barbora Krejčíková | 6 | 5 | 3
(Slovenia) Polona Hercog | 2 | 7 | 6
(United States) Irina Falconi | 1 | 7^{7} | 2
(Bulgaria) Viktoriya Tomova | 6 | 6^{2} | 6
(Netherlands) Lesley Kerkhove | 2 | 6 | 6
(Slovakia) Chantal Škamlová | 6 | 4 | 1
(Czech Republic) Petra Krejsová | 6 | 2 | 2
29 | (Italy) Martina Trevisan | 3 | 6 | 6

Second round
(Slovenia) Polona Hercog | 2 | 4
(Bulgaria) Viktoriya Tomova | 6 | 6
(Netherlands) Lesley Kerkhove | 6 | 6
29 | (Italy) Martina Trevisan | 0 | 4

Qualifying competition
(Bulgaria) Viktoriya Tomova | 3 | 6 | 3
(Netherlands) Lesley Kerkhove | 6 | 4 | 6
