= 2014 ITF Women's Circuit – Xi'an – Doubles =

Xi'an – Doubles
- 2014 ITF Women's Circuit – Xi'an

Final
- Champions: (China) Lu Jiajing (China) Wang Yafan
- Runners-up: (China) Liang Chen (China) Yang Zhaoxuan
- Score: 6–3, 7–6^{(7–2)}

Events
Singles	Doubles
← 2013 ·	ITF Women's Circuit – Xi'an	· 2015 →

The tournament in Xi'an was a new addition to the ITF Women's Circuit.

Lu Jiajing and Wang Yafan won the inaugural tournament, defeating Liang Chen and Yang Zhaoxuan in the final, 6–3, 7–6^{(7–2)}.

== Seeds ==
1. (Chinese Taipei) Chan Chin-wei / (China) Xu Yifan (quarterfinals)
2. (Chinese Taipei) Chuang Chia-jung / (Japan) Junri Namigata (semifinals)
3. (China) Han Xinyun / (China) Zhang Kailin (first round)
4. (Japan) Miyabi Inoue / (Thailand) Noppawan Lertcheewakarn (first round)

== Draw ==
=== Key ===
- Q = Qualifier
- WC = Wild card
- LL = Lucky loser
- Alt = Alternate
- SE = Special exempt
- PR = Protected ranking
- ITF = ITF entry
- JE = Junior exempt
- w/o = Walkover
- r = Retired
- d = Defaulted
- SR = Special ranking

First round
1	(Chinese Taipei) C-w Chan (China) Y Xu	6	6
(South Korea) N-l Han (South Korea) M Yoo	4	4
(China) C Liu (China) R Tian	3	4
(Japan) N Hibino (Japan) R Sawayanagi	6	6
3	(China) X Han (China) K Zhang	6	4	[8]
(Japan) H Kuwata (Japan) M Tanaka	3	6	[10]
(China) C Liang (China) Z Yang	6	6
(China) Y Li (China) L Zhu	3	4
WC	(China) X Gao (China) X You	7^{9}	1	[8]
(Serbia) B Bonić (India) A Raina	6^{7}	6	[10]
(China) J Lu (China) Y Wang	6	4	[14]
4	(Japan) M Inoue (Thailand) N Lertcheewakarn	1	6	[12]
WC	(China) J Chen (China) A Zhu	6	3	[8]
(Chinese Taipei) S-y Hsieh (China) F Xun	3	6	[10]
WC	(China) H Tang (China) Y Wang	2	1
2	(Chinese Taipei) C-j Chuang (Japan) J Namigata	6	6

Quarterfinals
1	(Chinese Taipei) C-w Chan (China) Y Xu	6^{1}	6	[4]
(Japan) N Hibino (Japan) R Sawayanagi	7^{7}	3	[10]
(Japan) H Kuwata (Japan) M Tanaka	6^{5}	2
(China) C Liang (China) Z Yang	7^{7}	6
(Serbia) B Bonić (India) A Raina	6	4	[6]
(China) J Lu (China) Y Wang	3	6	[10]
(Chinese Taipei) S-y Hsieh (China) F Xun	3	4
2	(Chinese Taipei) C-j Chuang (Japan) J Namigata	6	6

Semifinals
(Japan) N Hibino (Japan) R Sawayanagi	0	5
(China) C Liang (China) Z Yang	6	7
(China) J Lu (China) Y Wang	3	7^{8}	[10]
2	(Chinese Taipei) C-j Chuang (Japan) J Namigata	6	6^{6}	[6]

Final
(China) C Liang (China) Z Yang	3	6^{2}
(China) J Lu (China) Y Wang	6	7^{7}
