= QNet Open =

- 2014 QNet Open

ITF Women's Tour
- Event name: QNet Open
- Location: Delhi, India
- Venue: DLTA Complex
- Category: ITF Women's Circuit
- Surface: Hard
- Draw: 32S/32Q/16D
- Prize money: $50,000

The QNet Open was a tournament for professional female tennis players played on outdoor hardcourts in 2014. The event was classified as a $50,000 ITF Circuit tournament and held in New Delhi, India at the DLTA Complex. The tournament was sponsored by Qnet, a Hong Kong–based multi-level marketing company.

In November 2014, the Mumbai Police's economic offences wing asked the All India Tennis Association for clarification of the tournament's sponsorship, as hundreds of the firm's accounts have been frozen.

== Editions ==
=== Singles ===
Year	Champion	Runner-up	Score
2014	(Serbia) Ivana Jorović	(Austria) Barbara Haas	6–2, 6–2

=== Doubles ===
Year	Champions	Runners-up	Score
2014	(China) Liu Chang (China) Lu Jiajing	(Russia) Marina Melnikova (Belgium) Elise Mertens	6–3, 6–0
