= Marina Melnikova =

Russian tennis player

Marina Melnikova Марина Мельникова
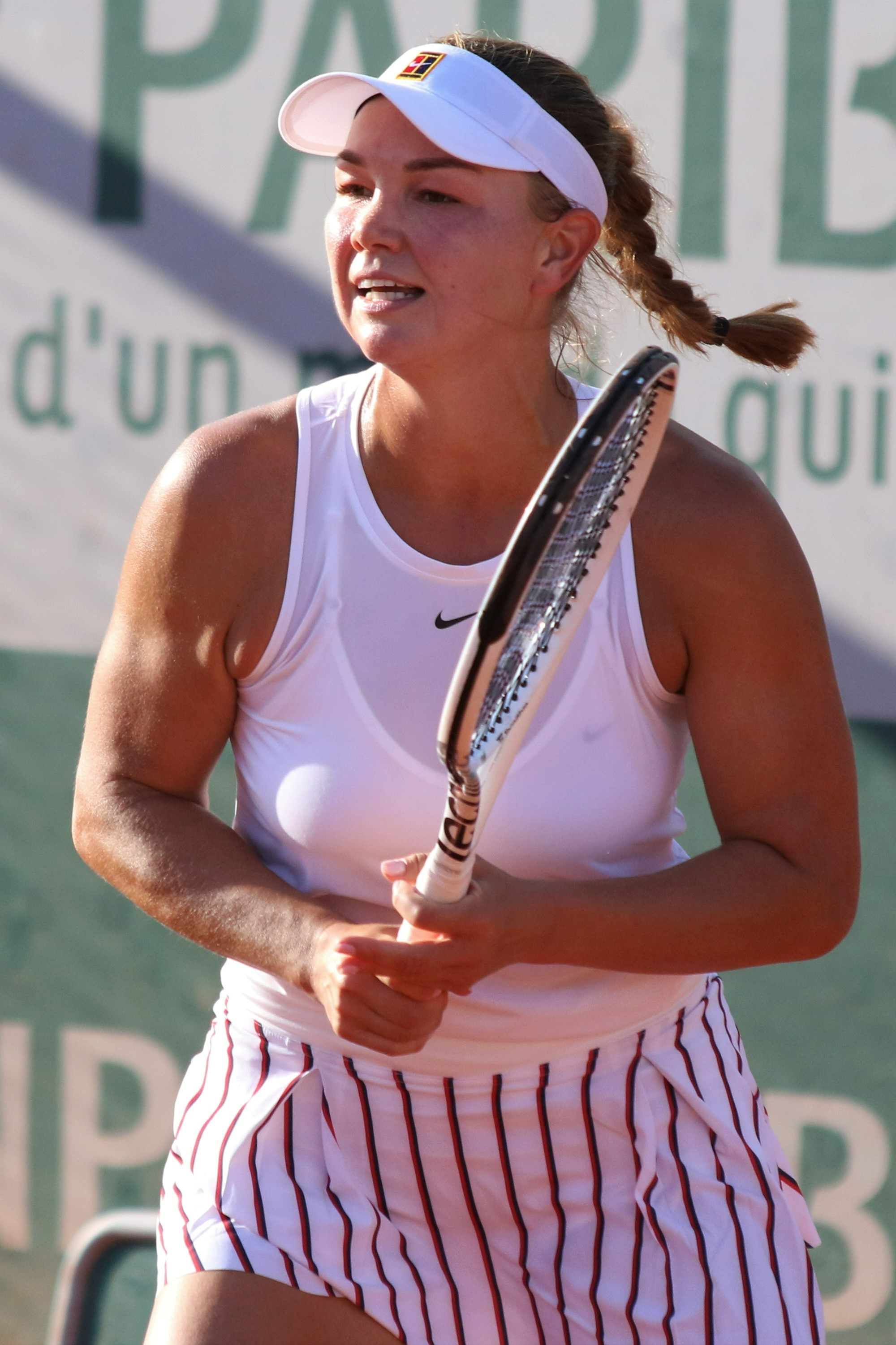
- Melnikova at the 2022 French Open
- Full name: Marina Anatolyevna Melnikova
- Country (sports): Russia
- Residence: Perm, Russia
- Born: 5 February 1989 (age 37) Perm, Soviet Union
- Height: 1.73 m (5 ft 8 in)
- Turned pro: 2005
- Coach: Oleg Mannapov
- Prize money: $702,277

Singles
- Career record: 446–410
- Career titles: 7 ITF
- Highest ranking: No. 170 (4 May 2015)

Grand Slam singles results
- Australian Open: Q1 (2015, 2020, 2021, 2022)
- French Open: Q2 (2022)
- Wimbledon: 1R (2016)
- US Open: Q2 (2021, 2023)

Doubles
- Career record: 241–197
- Career titles: 16 ITF
- Highest ranking: No. 80 (20 June 2016)

Grand Slam doubles results
- Wimbledon: Q1 (2016)

Marina Anatolyevna Melnikova (Russian: Марина Анатольевна Мельникова; born 5 February 1989) is an inactive Russian tennis player. She reached her best doubles ranking of world No. 80 on 20 June 2016. On 4 May 2015, she peaked at No. 170 in the singles rankings.

She has won seven singles and 16 doubles titles on the ITF Circuit.

== Personal life and background ==
Melnikova is currently coached by Oleg Mannapov. Her father is Anatoliy, mother is Elena, and brother is Sergey. She started playing at age seven when introduced to the sport by her dad. Her favorite surfaces are hardcourt and clay. After finishing school in 2008, she moved from Russia to Germany, and she speaks fluently English and German.

== Career ==
Melnikova made her WTA Tour debut 2008 at Barcelona and also featured 2009 in the Rosmalen Open, both times in the doubles draw.

She was a finalist at the 2014 Delhi Open in doubles, alongside Elise Mertens.

At the age of 35 and ranked No. 440 she qualified the 2024 San Diego Open but lost to fellow qualifier Canadian Marina Stakusic who was playing only her second main draw at a WTA Tour event.

== Grand Slam performance timeline ==
Key
W	F	SF	QF	#R	RR	Q#	DNQ	A	NH

(W) winner; (F) finalist; (SF) semifinalist; (QF) quarterfinalist; (#R) rounds 4, 3, 2, 1; (RR) round-robin stage; (Q#) qualification round; (DNQ) did not qualify; (A) absent; (NH) not held; (SR) strike rate (events won / competed); (W–L) win–loss record.
To avoid confusion and double counting, these charts are updated at the conclusion of a tournament or when the player's participation has ended.

== WTA Tour finals ==
=== Doubles: 1 (runner-up) ===
Legend WTA 500 WTA 250 (0–1)	Finals by surface Hard (0–1) Clay (0–0)

Result	Date	Tournament	Tier	Surface	Partner	Opponents	Score
Loss	Apr 2016	Katowice Open, Poland	International (Note: The WTA International tournaments were reclassified as WTA 250 tournaments in 2021.)	Hard (i)	(Russia) Valentyna Ivakhnenko	(Japan) Eri Hozumi (Japan) Miyu Kato	6–3, 5–7, [8–10]

== WTA 125 finals ==
=== Doubles: 1 (runner-up) ===
Result	Date	Tournament	Surface	Partner	Opponents	Score
Loss	Nov 2015	Taipei Open, Taiwan	Carpet (i)	(Belgium) Elise Mertens	(Japan) Kanae Hisami (Japan) Kotomi Takahata	1–6, 2–6

== ITF Circuit finals ==
=== Singles: 18 (7 titles, 11 runner-ups) ===
Legend $50,000 tournaments (1–1) W25/35 tournaments (5–9) W10/15 tournaments (1–1)	Finals by surface Hard (3–3) Clay (3–8) Grass (1–0)

Result	W–L	Date	Tournament	Tier	Surface	Opponent	Score
Win	1–0	Sep 2008	Open de Limoges, France	10,000	Hard (i)	(Russia) Valeria Savinykh	1–0 ret.
Loss	1–1	Sep 2011	Saransk Cup, Russia	50,000	Clay	(Russia) Alexandra Panova	0–6, 2–6
Loss	1–2	Feb 2014	ITF São Paulo, Brazil	25,000	Clay	(Liechtenstein) Stephanie Vogt	1–6, 4–6
Loss	1–3	Jun 2014	ITF Kristinehamn, Sweden	25,000	Clay	(Belgium) Ysaline Bonaventure	3–6, 3–6
Win	2–3	Nov 2014	ITF Mumbai, India	25,000	Hard	(Slovenia) Tadeja Majerič	6–2, 7–6^{(4)}
Win	3–3	Jun 2016	Surbiton Trophy, UK	50,000	Grass	(France) Stéphanie Foretz	6–3, 7–6^{(6)}
Loss	3–4	Sep 2017	ITF Schoonhoven, Netherlands	15,000	Clay	(Mexico) Ana Sofía Sánchez	3–6, 4–6
Win	4–4	Sep 2017	Royal Cup, Montenegro	25,000	Clay	(Czech Republic) Jesika Malečková	6–2, 6–0
Win	5–4	Dec 2018	ITF Solapur, India	25,000	Hard	(China) Lu Jiajing	6–1, 6–2
Loss	5–5	Sep 2019	Royal Cup, Montenegro	W25	Clay	(Croatia) Tena Lukas	4–6, 5–7
Win	6–5	Oct 2019	ITF Hilton Head, United States	W25	Clay	(United States) Elizabeth Halbauer	6–3, 6–4
Loss	6–6	Nov 2019	ITF Minsk, Belarus	W25	Hard (i)	(Russia) Anastasia Zakharova	3–6, 4–6
Loss	6–7	Mar 2020	ITF Potchefstroom, South Africa	W25	Hard	(United Kingdom) Samantha Murray Sharan	6–2, 2–6, 4–6
Loss	6–8	Apr 2021	ITF Oeiras, Portugal	W25	Clay	(Spain) María Gutiérrez Carrasco	3–6, 2–6
Loss	6–9	Sep 2021	ITF Marbella, Spain	W25	Clay	(South Korea) Park So-hyun	1–6, 6–7^{(6)}
Loss	6–10	Feb 2022	ITF Sharm El Sheikh, Egypt	W25	Hard	(Romania) Alexandra Cadanțu-Ignatik	6–0, 3–6, 3–6
Win	7–10	Mar 2022	ITF Anapoima, Colombia	W25	Clay	(Argentina) Paula Ormaechea	6–2, 6–1
Loss	7–11	Aug 2024	ITF Braunschweig, Germany	W35	Clay	(Austria) Sinja Kraus	3–6, 6–3, 1–6

=== Doubles: 37 (16 titles, 21 runner-ups) ===
Legend $50/60,000 tournaments (3–5) W50 tournaments (1–0) $25,000 tournaments (5–9) $10,000 tournaments (7–7)	Finals by surface Hard (6–7) Clay (8–11) Carpet (2–3)

Result	W–L	Date	Tournament	Tier	Surface	Partner	Opponents	Score
Loss	0–1	Aug 2007	ITF Savitaipale, Finland	10,000	Clay	(Netherlands) Marcella Koek	(Italy) Nicole Clerico (Belgium) Davinia Lobbinger	6–7^{(4)}, 5–7
Win	1–1	Nov 2007	ITF Mallorca, Spain	10,000	Clay	(Poland) Sylwia Zagórska	(Israel) Julia Glushko (France) Charlène Vanneste	6–4, 6–4
Win	2–1	Feb 2008	ITF Albufeira, Portugal	10,000	Hard	(Israel) Julia Glushko	(Slovakia) Martina Babáková (Russia) Elena Chalova	6–3, 0–6, [11–9]
Loss	2–2	Apr 2008	ITF Namangan, Uzbekistan	25,000	Hard	(Netherlands) Chayenne Ewijk	(Russia) Vasilisa Davydova (Russia) Maria Zharkova	6–3, 5–7, [6–10]
Loss	2–3	Oct 2008	ITF Porto, Portugal	10,000	Clay	(Netherlands) Michelle Gerards	(Czech Republic) Jana Jandová (Czech Republic) Kateřina Vaňková	3–6, 6–4, [6–10]
Loss	2–4	Nov 2008	ITF Mallorca, Spain	10,000	Clay	(Netherlands) Michelle Gerards	(Italy) Benedetta Davato (Italy) Giulia Gasparri	2–6, 4–6
Win	3–4	Nov 2008	ITF Astana, Kazakhstan	25,000	Hard (i)	(Russia) Anastasia Poltoratskaya	(Russia) Marina Shamayko (Georgia (country)) Sofia Shapatava	6–1, 6–1
Win	4–4	Jan 2009	ITF Kaarst, Germany	10,000	Carpet (i)	(Russia) Elena Chalova	(Germany) Julia Babilon (Germany) Franziska Etzel	6–3, 6–2
Win	5–4	Nov 2009	ITF Le Havre, France	10,000	Clay (i)	(Romania) Mihaela Buzărnescu	(France) Amandine Hesse (France) Alizé Lim	6–2, 7–6^{(4)}
Loss	5–5	Jul 2010	ITF Bree, Belgium	10,000	Clay	(Netherlands) Marcella Koek	(Belgium) Sofie Oyen (Netherlands) Demi Schuurs	0–6, 1–6
Win	6–5	Dec 2010	ITF Ain Sukhna, Egypt	10,000	Clay	(Russia) Galina Fokina	(Italy) Indra Bigi (Italy) Nicole Clerico	6–3, 2–6, [13–11]
Loss	6–6	Dec 2010	ITF Ain Sukhna, Egypt	10,000	Clay	(Russia) Galina Fokina	(Ukraine) Sofiya Kovalets (South Africa) Chanel Simmonds	1–6, 2–6
Win	7–6	Jan 2011	ITF Stuttgart, Germany	10,000	Hard (i)	(Netherlands) Daniëlle Harmsen	(Slovakia) Jana Čepelová (Slovakia) Michaela Pochabová	3–6, 6–4, [14–12]
Loss	7–7	Jan 2011	ITF Kaarst, Germany	10,000	Carpet (i)	(Poland) Paula Kania	(Czech Republic) Nikola Fraňková (Czech Republic) Tereza Hladíková	6–3, 6–7^{(1)}, [8–10]
Loss	7–8	Jul 2011	Open de Pozoblanco, Spain	50,000	Hard	(Georgia (country)) Sofia Shapatava	(Russia) Nina Bratchikova (France) Irena Pavlovic	2–6, 4–6
Win	8–8	Sep 2011	Save Cup, Italy	50,000	Clay	(Ukraine) Valentyna Ivakhnenko	(Hungary) Tímea Babos (Poland) Magda Linette	6–4, 7–5
Loss	8–9	Jan 2012	ITF Kaarst, Germany	10,000	Carpet (i)	(Russia) Alexandra Artamonova	(Russia) Margarita Gasparyan (Russia) Anna Smolina	7–6^{(2)}, 2–6, [8–10]
Loss	8–10	Jul 2012	ITF Imola, Italy	25,000	Carpet	(Slovenia) Tadeja Majerič	(Italy) Alice Balducci (Italy) Federica di Sarra	w/o
Loss	8–11	Aug 2012	ITF Rebecq, Belgium	25,000	Clay	(Netherlands) Lesley Kerkhove	(Romania) Diana Buzean (Netherlands) Daniëlle Harmsen	4–6, 2–6
Loss	8–12	Sep 2012	ITF Sofia, Bulgaria	25,000	Clay	(Romania) Raluca Olaru	(Poland) Katarzyna Piter (Poland) Barbara Sobaszkiewicz	5–7, 1–6
Win	9–12	Apr 2013	ITF Heraklion, Greece	10,000	Carpet	(Serbia) Teodora Mirčić	(Greece) Despina Papamichail (Italy) Giulia Sussarello	6–1, 6–4
Loss	9–13	Dec 2013	ITF Mérida, Mexico	25,000	Hard	(Romania) Laura Ioana Andrei	(Argentina) Vanesa Furlanetto (Argentina) Florencia Molinero	6–2, 6–7^{(8)}, [7–10]
Loss	9–14	May 2014	Nana Trophy, Tunisia	25,000	Clay	(Spain) Beatriz García Vidagany	(Venezuela) Andrea Gámiz (Russia) Valeria Savinykh	4–6, 1–6
Loss	9–15	Aug 2014	ITF Westende, Belgium	25,000	Hard	(Russia) Evgeniya Rodina	(Belgium) Ysaline Bonaventure (Belgium) Elise Mertens	2–6, 2–6
Loss	9–16	Aug 2014	ITF Fleurus, Belgium	25,000	Clay	(Sweden) Hilda Melander	(Netherlands) Arantxa Rus (Netherlands) Demi Schuurs	4–6, 1–6
Loss	9–17	Nov 2014	Delhi Open, India	50,000	Hard	(Belgium) Elise Mertens	(China) Liu Chang (China) Lu Jiajing	3–6, 0–6
Win	10–17	Jul 2015	Bursa Cup, Turkey	50,000	Clay	(Spain) Laura Pous Tió	(Georgia (country)) Sofia Shapatava (Ukraine) Anastasiya Vasylyeva	6–4, 6–4
Loss	10–18	Sep 2015	Internacional de Monterrey, Mexico	50,000	Hard	(Luxembourg) Mandy Minella	(Belgium) Ysaline Bonaventure (Belgium) Elise Mertens	4–6, 6–3, [9–11]
Loss	10–19	Oct 2015	Abierto Tampico, Mexico	50,000	Hard	(Paraguay) Verónica Cepede Royg	(Argentina) María Irigoyen (Czech Republic) Barbora Krejčíková	5–7, 2–6
Win	11–19	Dec 2015	Ankara Cup, Turkey	50,000	Hard (i)	(Spain) María José Martínez Sánchez	(Poland) Paula Kania (Netherlands) Lesley Kerkhove	6–4, 5–7, [10–8]
Win	12–19	Jun 2019	Open de Montpellier, France	W25	Clay	(Netherlands) Eva Wacanno	(Uzbekistan) Albina Khabibulina (Germany) Julia Wachaczyk	4–6, 6–4, [10–3]
Loss	12–20	Aug 2019	ITF Bad Saulgau, Germany	W25	Clay	(Russia) Ksenia Laskutova	(Spain) Georgina García Pérez (Spain) Sara Sorribes Tormo	3–6, 1–6
Win	13–20	Sep 2019	ITF Prague Open, Czech Republic	W25	Clay	(Netherlands) Suzan Lamens	(Poland) Katarzyna Piter (Ukraine) Anastasiya Shoshyna	6–2, 5–7, [10–8]
Win	14–20	Nov 2019	ITF Saint-Étienne, France	W25	Hard (i)	(Romania) Laura Ioana Paar	(Spain) Cristina Bucșa (Germany) Julia Wachaczyk	6–3, 6–7^{(7)}, [11–9]
Loss	14–21	Apr 2021	Oeiras Ladies Open, Portugal	W60	Clay	(Switzerland) Conny Perrin	(Belarus) Lidziya Marozava (Romania) Andreea Mitu	6–3, 4–6, [3–10]
Win	15–21	Apr 2021	ITF Oeiras, Portugal	W25	Clay	(Netherlands) Suzan Lamens	(Russia) Natela Dzalamidze (Russia) Sofya Lansere	6–3, 6–1
Win	16–21	Feb 2024	ITF Morelia, Mexico	W50	Hard	(Netherlands) Lesley Pattinama Kerkhove	(Spain) Irene Burillo (United States) Rasheeda McAdoo	6–4, 4–6, [11–9]
