= ITF Women's Circuit – Xi'an =

ITF Women's Tour
- Event name: Xi'an
- Location: Xi'an, China
- Venue: Shaanxi Tennis Center
- Category: ITF $50,000
- Surface: Hard
- Draw: 32S/32Q/16D
- Prize money: $50,000

The ITF Women's Circuit – Xi'an was a tournament for professional female tennis players played on outdoor hard courts. The event was classified as a $50,000 ITF Women's Circuit tournament and only held once in 2014.

== Past finals ==
=== Singles ===
Year	Champion	Runner-up	Score
2014	(China) Duan Yingying	(China) Zhu Lin	4–6, 7–6^{(11–9)}, 6–4

=== Doubles ===
Year	Champions	Runners-up	Score
2014	(China) Lu Jiajing (China) Wang Yafan	(China) Liang Chen (China) Yang Zhaoxuan	6–3, 7–6^{(7–2)}
