= Barbara Haas =

Austrian tennis player

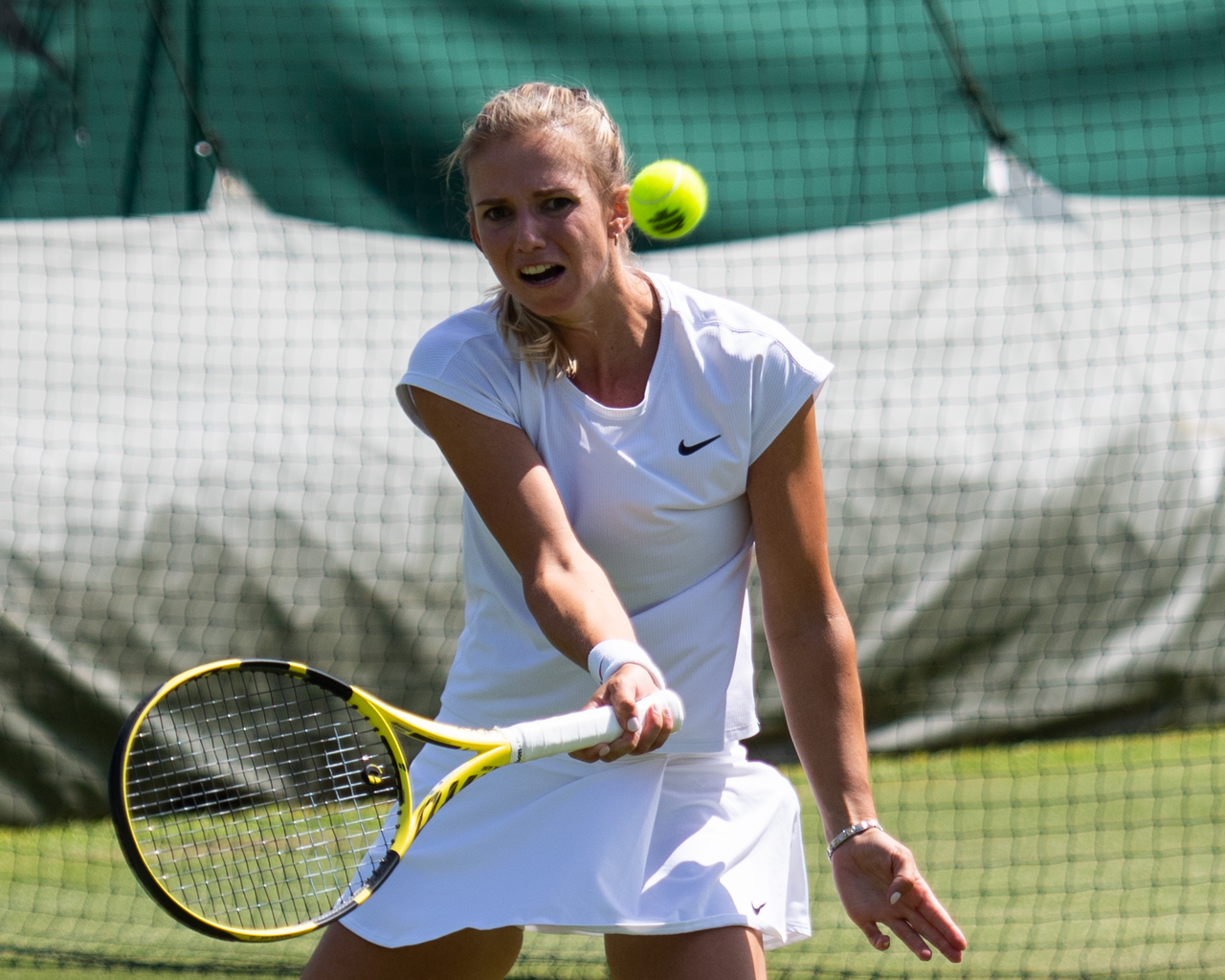
- Haas at Wimbledon 2022
- Country (sports): Austria
- Born: 19 March 1996 (age 29); Steyr, Austria
- Height: 1.65 m (5 ft 5 in)
- Plays: Right-handed
- Prize money: US$ 727,316

Singles
- Career record: 338–202
- Career titles: 16 ITF
- Highest ranking: No. 133 (24 February 2020)

Grand Slam singles results
- Australian Open: Q3 (2020)
- French Open: 1R (2020)
- Wimbledon: Q3 (2016, 2018)
- US Open: 1R (2016, 2020)

Doubles
- Career record: 43–42
- Career titles: 3 ITF
- Highest ranking: No. 164 (27 September 2021)

Team competitions
- Fed Cup: 16–8

Barbara Haas (German pronunciation: [ˈbaʁbaʁa ˈhaːs]; born 19 March 1996) is an inactive Austrian tennis player. She has won 16 singles titles and three doubles titles on the ITF Circuit. On 24 February 2020, she reached her best singles ranking by the WTA of 133. On 27 September 2021, she peaked at No. 164 in the doubles rankings.

Playing for the Austria Fed Cup team, Haas has a win–loss record of 16–8.

== Career ==
Haas made her WTA Tour debut at the 2012 Gastein Ladies and also played at the 2012 Linz Open.

== Grand Slam singles performance timelines ==
Key
W	F	SF	QF	#R	RR	Q#	P#	DNQ	A	Z#	PO	G	S	B	NMS	NTI	P	NH

(W) winner; (F) finalist; (SF) semifinalist; (QF) quarterfinalist; (#R) rounds 4, 3, 2, 1; (RR) round-robin stage; (Q#) qualification round; (P#) preliminary round; (DNQ) did not qualify; (A) absent; (Z#) Davis/Fed Cup Zonal Group (with number indication) or (PO) play-off; (G) gold, (S) silver or (B) bronze Olympic/Paralympic medal; (NMS) not a Masters tournament; (NTI) not a Tier I tournament; (P) postponed; (NH) not held; (SR) strike rate (events won / competed); (W–L) win–loss record.
To avoid confusion and double counting, these charts are updated at the conclusion of a tournament or when the player's participation has ended.

Tournament	2016	2017	2018	2019	2020	2021	2022	2023	W–L
Australian Open	A	Q1	Q1	Q1	Q3	Q1	A	Q1	0–0
French Open	Q3	Q2	Q1	A	1R	Q1	A	A	0–1
Wimbledon	Q3	Q2	Q3	Q1	NH	Q2	Q1	A	0–0
US Open	1R	Q2	A	Q1	1R	Q1	Q1	A	0–2
Win–loss	0–1	0–0	0–0	0–0	0–2	0–0	0–0	0–0	0–3

== WTA Tour finals ==
=== Doubles: 2 (runner-ups) ===
Legend Grand Slam WTA 1000 WTA 500 WTA 250 (0–2)	Finals by surface Hard (0–2) Clay (0–0) Grass (0–0) Carpet (0–0)

Result	Date	Tournament	Tier	Surface	Partner	Opponents	Score
Loss	Oct 2019	Linz Open, Austria	International (Note: The WTA International tournaments were reclassified as WTA 250 tournaments in 2021.)	Hard (i)	(Switzerland) Xenia Knoll	(Czech Republic) Barbora Krejčíková (Czech Republic) Kateřina Siniaková	4–6, 3–6
Loss	Feb 2020	Hua Hin Championships, Thailand	International	Hard	(Australia) Ellen Perez	(Australia) Arina Rodionova (Australia) Storm Sanders	3–6, 3–6

== ITF Circuit finals ==
=== Singles: 28 (16 titles, 12 runner–ups) ===
Legend $50/60,000 tournaments $25,000 tournaments $10,000 tournaments	Finals by surface Hard (6–8) Clay (10–4)

Result	W–L	Date	Tournament	Tier	Surface	Opponent	Score
Loss	0–1	Feb 2012	ITF Sharm El Sheikh, Egypt	10,000	Hard	(Russia) Natela Dzalamidze	3–6, 7–6^{(3)}, 0–6
Win	1–1	Jul 2012	ITF Vienna, Austria	10,000	Clay	(France) Amandine Hesse	6–1, 6–4
Loss	1–2	Sep 2012	ITF Sharm El Sheikh, Egypt	10,000	Hard	(Switzerland) Belinda Bencic	4–6, 0–6
Loss	1–3	Feb 2013	ITF Sharm El Sheikh, Egypt	10,000	Hard	(Russia) Marina Shamayko	6–4, 3–6, 3–6
Win	2–3	Dec 2013	ITF Djibouti	10,000	Hard	(Chinese Taipei) Lee Hua-chen	6–4, 6–3
Win	3–3	Dec 2013	ITF Djibouti	10,000	Hard	(Chinese Taipei) Lee Hua-chen	6–3, 6–3
Loss	3–4	Feb 2014	ITF Sharm El Sheikh, Egypt	10,000	Hard	(Montenegro) Ana Veselinović	5–7, 7–5, 3–6
Loss	3–5	May 2014	ITF Velenje, Slovenia	10,000	Clay	(Slovenia) Tamara Zidanšek	6–4, 2–6, 3–6
Win	4–5	Jul 2014	ITF Bad Waltersdorf, Austria	10,000	Clay	(Croatia) Iva Mekovec	7–6^{(6)}, 6–3
Loss	4–6	Aug 2014	ITF Pörtschach, Austria	10,000	Clay	(Austria) Pia König	3–6, 6–4, 5–7
Win	5–6	Sep 2014	ITF Sankt Pölten, Austria	10,000	Clay	(Italy) Anna Remondina	7–6^{(1)}, 0–6, 6–1
Loss	5–7	Oct 2014	ITF Heraklion, Greece	10,000	Hard	(Slovakia) Viktória Kužmová	4–6, 3–6
Loss	5–8	Oct 2014	ITF Heraklion, Greece	10,000	Hard	(Hungary) Réka Luca Jani	6–4, 3–6, 6–7^{(6)}
Loss	5–9	Nov 2014	New Delhi Open, India	50,000	Hard	(Serbia) Ivana Jorović	2–6, 2–6
Loss	5–10	Mar 2015	ITF Antalya, Turkey	10,000	Hard	(Ukraine) Alyona Sotnikova	3–6, 3–6
Win	6–10	Aug 2015	ITF Graz, Austria	10,000	Clay	(Austria) Julia Grabher	1–6, 6–1, 6–2
Win	7–10	Sep 2015	Royal Cup, Montenegro	25,000	Clay	(Serbia) Doroteja Erić	6–3, 6–1
Win	8–10	Dec 2015	ITF Navi Mumbai, India	25,000	Hard	(Belarus) Aryna Sabalenka	7–6^{(2)}, 7–6^{(6)}
Win	9–10	Feb 2016	ITF Port Pirie, Australia	25,000	Hard	(Australia) Arina Rodionova	6–4, 5–7, 6–4
Win	10–10	Mar 2016	ITF Naples, United States	25,000	Clay	(Ukraine) Elizaveta Ianchuk	3–6, 6–2, 6–2
Win	11–10	Apr 2017	ITF Jackson, United States	25,000	Clay	(United States) Sophie Chang	6–4, 6–7^{(3)}, 6–4
Loss	11–11	Jul 2017	Reinert Open, Germany	60,000	Clay	(Romania) Mihaela Buzărnescu	0–6, 2–6
Win	12–11	Sep 2018	ITF Sofia, Bulgaria	25,000	Clay	(Germany) Katharina Hobgarski	6–3, 6–2
Win	13–11	Dec 2018	ITF Navi Mumbai, India	25,000	Hard	(Latvia) Diāna Marcinkeviča	0–6, 6–3, 7–5
Loss	13–12	Jun 2019	Internazionale di Roma, Italy	60,000	Clay	(Italy) Sara Errani	1–6, 4–6
Win	14–12	Aug 2019	Ladies Open Hechingen, Germany	60,000	Clay	(Serbia) Olga Danilovic	6–2, 6–1
Win	15–12	Sep 2019	ITF Prague Open, Czech Republic	25,000	Clay	(Germany) Julyette Steur	7–5, 4–6, 6–0
Win	16–12	Dec 2019	ITF Navi Mumbai, India (2)	25,000	Hard	(South Korea) Jeong Su-nam	4–6, 6–2, 7–6^{(2)}

=== Doubles: 6 (3 titles, 3 runner–ups) ===
Legend $60,000 tournaments $10/15,000 tournaments	Finals by surface Hard (1–2) Clay (2–1)

Result	W–L	Date	Tournament	Tier	Surface	Partner	Opponents	Score
Loss	0–1	Apr 2012	ITF Muscat, Oman	10,000	Hard	(France) Laëtitia Sarrazin	(India) Kyra Shroff (Russia) Yana Sizikova	2–6, 4–6
Win	1–1	Feb 2013	ITF Sharm El Sheikh, Egypt	10,000	Hard	(Serbia) Doroteja Erić	(Czech Republic) Martina Kubičíková (Slovakia) Chantal Škamlová	6–2, 7–5
Loss	1–2	Jun 2014	ITF Amarante, Portugal	10,000	Hard	(Poland) Natalia Siedliska	(Russia) Anastasiya Komardina (Ukraine) Valeriya Strakhova	6–3, 5–7, [6–10]
Win	2–2	Apr 2015	ITF Cairo, Egypt	15,000	Clay	(Egypt) Sandra Samir	(France) Amandine Hesse (France) Marine Partaud	0–6, 6–4, [10–7]
Loss	2–3	Jun 2015	ITF Breda, Netherlands	15,000	Clay	(Austria) Pia König	(Belarus) Sviatlana Pirazhenka (Ukraine) Alyona Sotnikova	3–6, 1–6
Win	3–3	Apr 2021	Zagreb Ladies Open, Croatia	60,000	Clay	(Poland) Katarzyna Kawa	(Romania) Andreea Prisăcariu (Slovenia) Nika Radišić	7–6^{(1)}, 5–7, [10–6]
