= Ivana Jorović =

Serbian tennis player (born 1997)

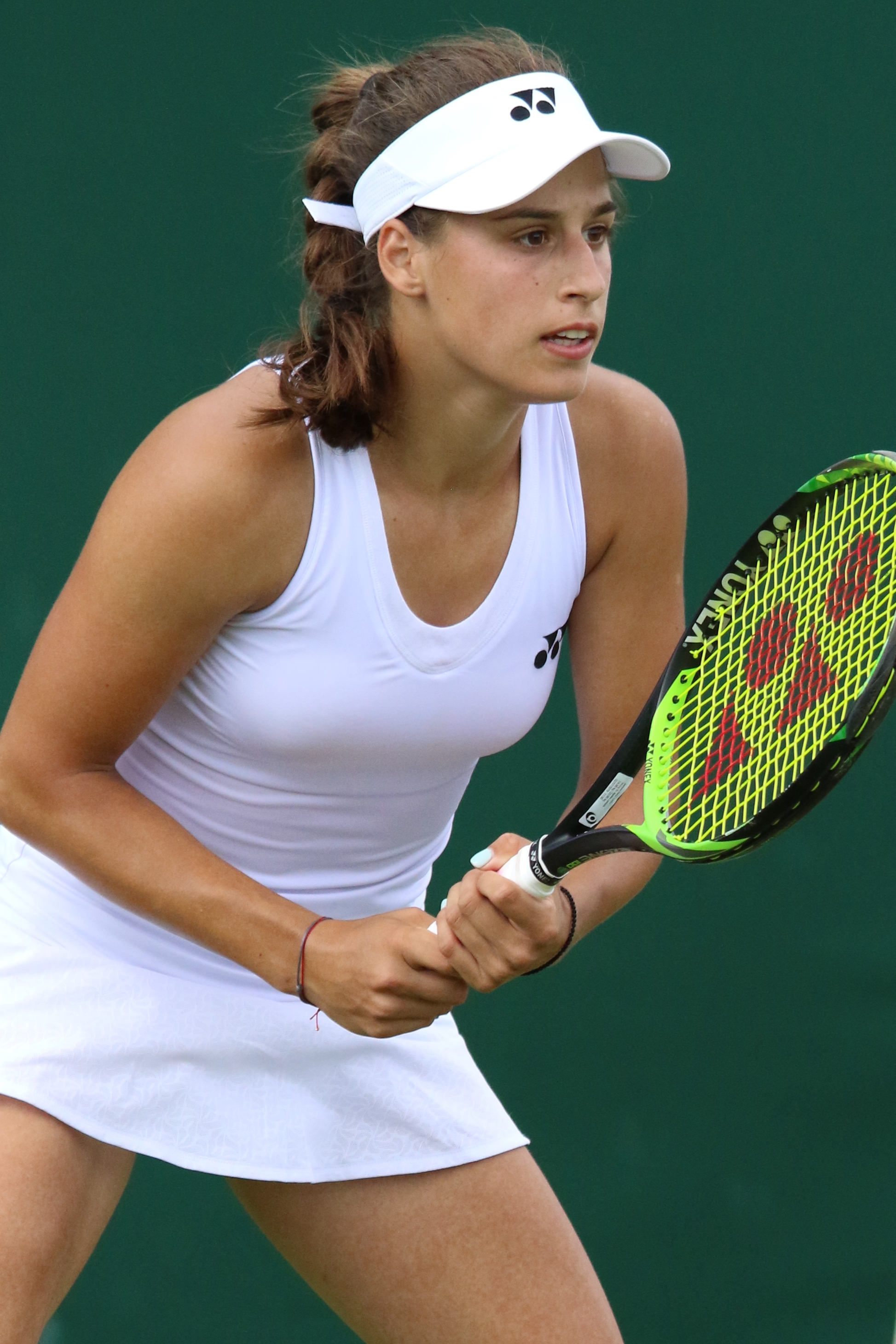
- Jorović at the 2019 Wimbledon
- Country (sports): Serbia
- Born: 3 May 1997 (age 29) Čačak, Serbia, Yugoslavia
- Height: 1.74 m (5 ft 9 in)
- Retired: Feb 2025 (last match played)
- Plays: Right-handed (two-handed backhand)
- Coach: Nemanja Plavšić (2018–present); Nemanja Lalić (2018–)
- Prize money: $808,067

Singles
- Career record: 238–138
- Career titles: 13 ITF
- Highest ranking: No. 86 (15 July 2019)

Grand Slam singles results
- Australian Open: 1R (2018)
- French Open: 1R (2019, 2021)
- Wimbledon: 2R (2019)
- US Open: 1R (2019, 2021)

Other tournaments
- Olympic Games: 1R (2021)

Doubles
- Career record: 36–32
- Career titles: 3 ITF
- Highest ranking: No. 299 (17 July 2017)

Grand Slam doubles results
- US Open: 1R (2021)

Team competitions
- Fed Cup: 13–10

Ivana Jorović (Serbian Cyrillic: Ивана Јоровић; born 3 May 1997) is an inactive tennis player from Serbia.

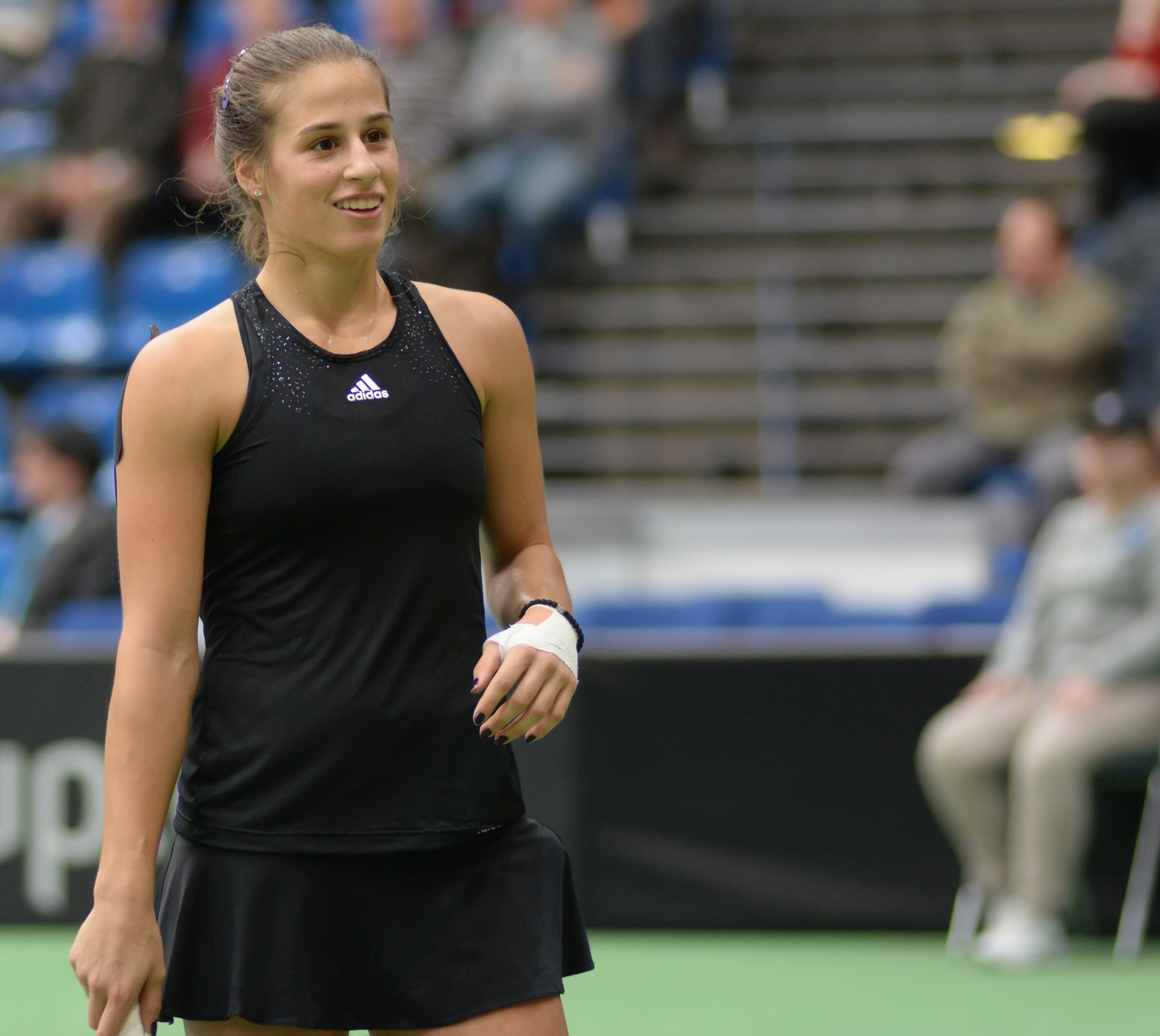
Jorović during 2015 Fed Cup

In her career, she won thirteen singles and three doubles titles on the ITF Women's Circuit. On 15 July 2019, she reached her best singles ranking of world No. 86. On 17 July 2017, she peaked at No. 299 in the doubles rankings.

Playing for Serbia Billie Jean King Cup team, Jorović has a win–loss record of 13–10. She was nominated for the Fed Cup Heart Award in 2015 and 2017.

== National representation ==
=== 2015: Fed Cup debut ===
On 4 February, Jorović played her first Fed Cup match, in Europe/Africa Zone Group I, where Serbia played against Austria. She defeated Barbara Haas in straight sets. After that, she made her debut in doubles in Fed Cup, partnering Aleksandra Krunić; they won against Austrian combination Julia Grabher / Sandra Klemenschits, in straight sets.

A day later, Serbia played against Hungary, and Ivana was chosen for the first match against Dalma Gálfi. She won that match, letting her opponent win only one game. Later, together with Aleksandra Krunić, she lost to Hungarian pair Tímea Babos/Réka Luca Jani, in three sets.

In the Group I Play-offs, Serbia played against Croatia. Again, Jorović was chosen for the opening match and she defeated Ana Konjuh in three sets. She also should have competed in doubles, but Serbia already had won 2–0, so the match was cancelled.

In April, Serbia played against Paraguay for a place in the World Group II in the Play–offs. Jorović lost her match against Verónica Cepede Royg, in three sets, but with Krunić she won in doubles against Cepede Royg and Montserrat González, in straight sets.

== Career ==
=== Junior years ===
Čačak-born Jorović was ranked the No. 1 junior tennis player in the world in June 2014, and was a finalist in girls' doubles at the Australian Open and girls' singles at the French Open in 2014.

=== 2014–2017: WTA Tour debut ===
Jorović won the Delhi Open in India in 2014.

She made her WTA Tour main-draw debut at 2016 Jiangxi International Open in Nanchang, losing in the first round to fifth seed Zhang Kailin, in three sets.

In June 2017, she reached the quarterfinals of the WTA 125 Bol Open, where she lost to eventual champion Aleksandra Krunić.

=== 2018: Major debut & biggest title ===
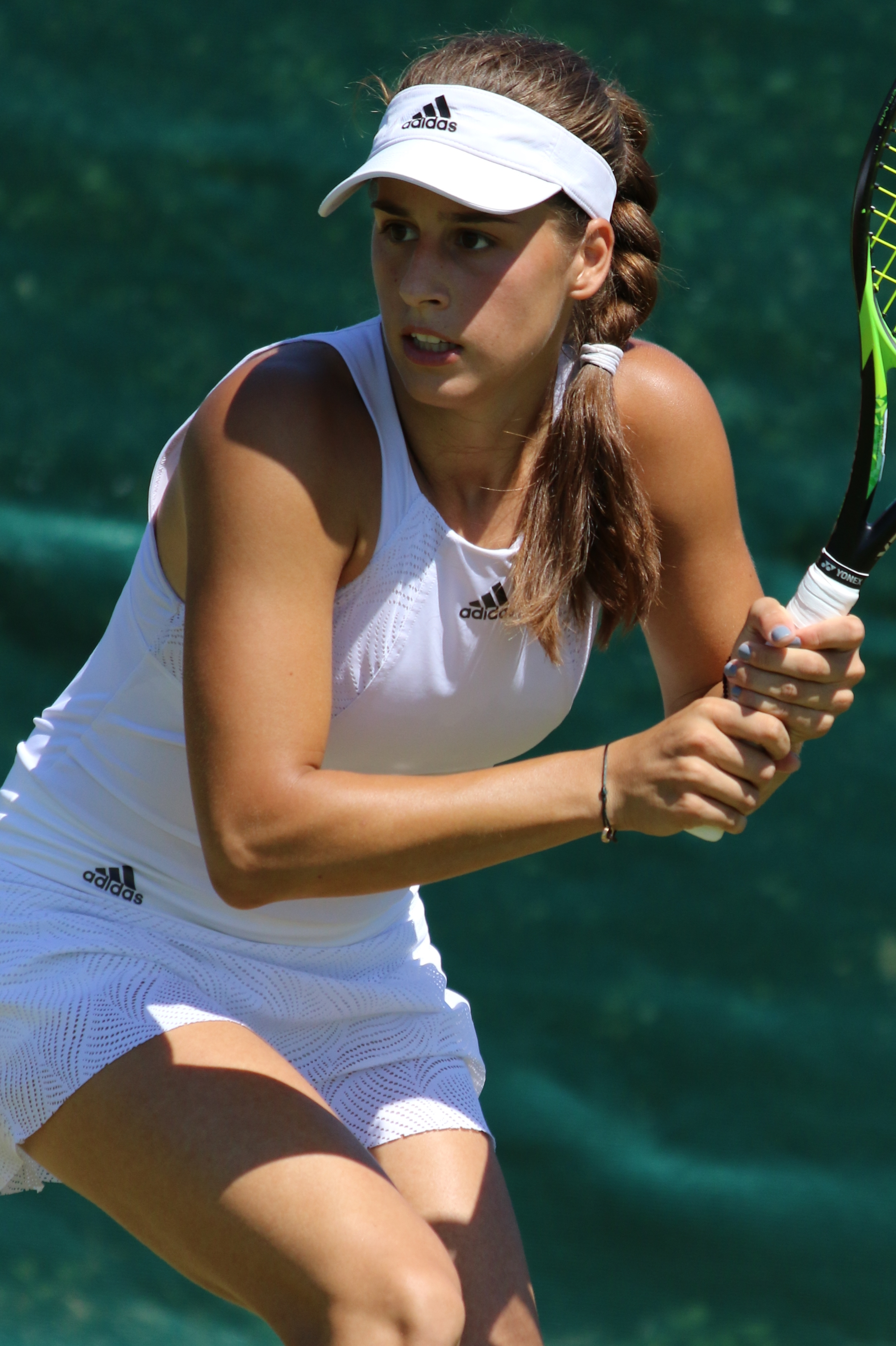
Jorović at the 2018 Wimbledon

Jorović started her year in the Australian Open qualifying, where she made her major main-draw debut, beating Arantxa Rus, Ysaline Bonaventure and Bibiane Schoofs, to advance to the main draw, where she was beaten by fourth seed Elina Svitolina. Then, she entered the 25k in Altenkirchen, where she lost to Chloé Paquet in the second round. At the 60k Zhuhai Open, she lost in the final round of qualifying to Xun Fangying, while at the 60k Pingshan Open, she made it through the qualifying but lost to Marta Kostyuk in the first round of the main draw. She played at another 60k in Croissy-Beaubourg, where she lost in the second round of qualifying to Jesika Malečková.

In April, Jorović entered two 25k events in Óbidos, winning the first one by beating Miriam Kolodziejová in the final, while in another she lost to Katie Swan in the quarterfinal. In the 100k Khimki Ladies Cup, she reached the quarterfinals, after beating Anastasia Gasanova and Dejana Radanović, but bowed out to Monica Niculescu. In May, she played in two 60k events in Japan, reaching the quarterfinals in Fukuoka where she lost to Momoko Kobori, and the second round of the Kurume Cup, retiring after only two games against Haruka Kaji.

In August, Jorović reached her second final of the season at the 25k Woking event, losing to Tereza Smitková. In her next tournament, the 25k event in Chiswick, she reached the semifinals losing to Vitalia Diatchenko. In late August, she made it to the quarterfinals of a 60k event in Budapest, where she lost to Barbara Haas.

In the Asian swing, Jorović reached the main draw of two WTA Tour events through qualifying in Guangzhou and Tashkent, respectively. She lost in the first round in Guangzhou, but beat Ekaterina Alexandrova in Tashkent for her first WTA Tour main-draw match win, before losing to Vera Lapko in the second round. She lost in the final qualifying round in Moscow to Vera Zvonareva and lost in the first round of main draw of the WTA 125 Mumbai Open, but won the 100k Shenzhen Longhua Open beating Zheng Saisai in the final for her biggest career title. Her final tournament of the season was the WTA 125 Taipei Open where she beat Sabina Sharipova in the first round, before losing to Tereza Martincová in the second.

== Performance timelines ==
Key
W	F	SF	QF	#R	RR	Q#	P#	DNQ	A	Z#	PO	G	S	B	NMS	NTI	P	NH

(W) winner; (F) finalist; (SF) semifinalist; (QF) quarterfinalist; (#R) rounds 4, 3, 2, 1; (RR) round-robin stage; (Q#) qualification round; (P#) preliminary round; (DNQ) did not qualify; (A) absent; (Z#) Davis/Fed Cup Zonal Group (with number indication) or (PO) play-off; (G) gold, (S) silver or (B) bronze Olympic/Paralympic medal; (NMS) not a Masters tournament; (NTI) not a Tier I tournament; (P) postponed; (NH) not held; (SR) strike rate (events won / competed); (W–L) win–loss record.
To avoid confusion and double counting, these charts are updated at the conclusion of a tournament or when the player's participation has ended.

Only main-draw results in WTA Tour, Grand Slam tournaments, Fed Cup/Billie Jean King Cup and Olympic Games are included in win–loss records.

=== Singles ===
Tournament	2015	2016	2017	2018	2019	2020	2021	SR	W–L
Grand Slam tournaments
Australian Open	A	Q3	Q1	1R	Q3	A	A	0 / 1	0–1
French Open	A	Q3	Q1	A	1R	Q3	1R	0 / 2	0–2
Wimbledon	A	Q1	Q1	Q1	2R	NH	A	0 / 1	1–1
US Open	A	Q2	Q1	A	1R	A	1R	0 / 2	0–2
Win–loss	0–0	0–0	0–0	0–1	1–3	0–0	0–2	0 / 6	1–6
National representation
Billie Jean King Cup (Note: Formerly known as Fed Cup until 2020.)	PO	PO	PO	A	PO	PO (Note: Edition is split over two years due to COVID-19.)		0 / 0	9–5
WTA 1000
Dubai / Qatar Open (Note: The first Premier 5 event of the year has switched back and forth between the Dubai Tennis Championships and the Qatar Ladies Open since 2009. Dubai was classified as a Premier 5 event from 2009 to 2011 before being succeeded by Doha for the 2012–2014 period. In 2015, Dubai regained its Premier 5 status while Doha was demoted to Premier status. The Premier 5 tournaments were reclassified as WTA 1000 tournaments in 2021.)	A	A	A	A	2R	A	A	0 / 1	1–1
Madrid Open	A	A	A	A	Q1	NH	A	0 / 0	0–0
Career statistics
Tournaments	0	1	1	3	9	0	6	Career total: 20	
Titles	0	0	0	0	0	0	0	Career total: 0	
Finals	0	0	0	0	0	0	0	Career total: 0	
Overall win–loss	0–0	0–2	0–1	1–3	6–10	0–0	1–6	0 / 20	8–22
Year-end ranking (Note: 2012: WTA ranking–761, 2013: WTA ranking–850, 2014: WTA ranking–452.)	219	146	183	185	106	193	486		

== ITF Circuit finals ==
=== Singles: 16 (13 titles, 3 runner-ups) ===
Legend $100,000 tournaments (1–0) $50/60,000 tournaments (4–1) $25,000 tournaments (4–2) $10,000 tournaments (4–0)	Finals by surface Hard (10–2) Clay (1–1) Carpet (2–0)

Result	W–L	Date	Tournament	Tier	Surface	Opponent	Score
Win	1–0	Oct 2012	ITF Sharm El Sheikh, Egypt	10,000	Hard	(Germany) Jasmin Steinherr	6–4, 6–2
Win	2–0	Jun 2013	ITF Niš, Serbia	10,000	Clay	(Serbia) Doroteja Erić	6–4, 4–6, 6–3
Win	3–0	Nov 2013	ITF Sharm El Sheikh, Egypt	10,000	Hard	(Austria) Janina Toljan	6–0, 6–2
Win	4–0	Nov 2013	ITF Sharm El Sheikh, Egypt	10,000	Hard	(Spain) Arabela Fernández Rabener	6–2, 6–4
Win	5–0	Nov 2014	Delhi Open, India	50,000	Hard	(Austria) Barbara Haas	6–2, 6–2
Win	6–0	Oct 2015	ITF Istanbul, Turkey	25,000	Hard (i)	(Croatia) Jana Fett	6–3, 7–5
Win	7–0	Nov 2015	ITF Zawada, Poland	25,000	Carpet (i)	(Romania) Mihaela Buzărnescu	6–2, 6–2
Win	8–0	Dec 2015	Ankara Cup, Turkey	50,000	Hard (i)	(Turkey) Çağla Büyükakçay	7–6^{(3)}, 3–6, 6–2
Win	9–0	Apr 2016	Open de Seine-et-Marne, France	50,000	Hard (i)	(France) Pauline Parmentier	6–1, 4–6, 6–4
Win	10–0	Dec 2016	Ankara Cup, Turkey (2)	50,000	Hard (i)	(Russia) Vitalia Diatchenko	6–4, 7–5
Loss	10–1	Jan 2017	Open Andrézieux-Bouthéon, France	60,000	Hard (i)	(Estonia) Anett Kontaveit	4–6, 6–7^{(5)}
Win	11–1	Apr 2018	ITF Óbidos, Portugal	25,000	Carpet	(Czech Republic) Miriam Kolodziejová	6–1, 6–2
Loss	11–2	Aug 2018	GB Pro-Series Foxhills, UK	25,000	Hard	(Czech Republic) Tereza Smitková	7–6^{(5)}, 5–7, 4–6
Win	12–2	Nov 2018	Shenzhen Longhua Open, China	100,000	Hard	(China) Zheng Saisai	6–3, 2–6, 6–4
Win	13–2	Mar 2019	ITF Osaka, Japan	25,000	Hard	(China) Lu Jiajing	6–3, 5–7, 6–2
Loss	13–3	Jun 2022	ITF Pörtschach, Austria	25,000	Clay	(Austria) Sinja Kraus	1–6, 6–1, 2–6

=== Doubles: 4 (3 titles, 1 runner-up) ===
Legend $50/60,000 tournaments (2–0) $25,000 tournaments (1–1)	Finals by surface Hard (2–0) Clay (1–1)

Result	W–L	Date	Tournament	Tier	Surface	Partner	Opponents	Score
Win	1–0	Aug 2015	ITF Landisville, United States	25,000	Hard	(Australia) Jessica Moore	(United States) Brynn Boren (United States) Nadja Gilchrist	6–1, 6–3
Loss	1–1	Sep 2016	Royal Cup, Montenegro	25,000	Clay	(Switzerland) Xenia Knoll	(Bosnia and Herzegovina) Anita Husarić (Netherlands) Quirine Lemoine	6–3, 4–6, [4–10]
Win	2–1	Oct 2016	Open de Touraine, France	50,000	Hard (i)	(Netherlands) Lesley Kerkhove	(Romania) Alexandra Cadanțu (Russia) Ekaterina Yashina	6–3, 7–5
Win	3–1	Jul 2022	Liepāja Open, Latvia	60,000	Clay	(Slovenia) Dalila Jakupović	(United Kingdom) Emily Appleton (India) Prarthana Thombare	6–4, 6–3

== Junior Grand Slam tournament finals ==
=== Girls' singles: 1 (runner-up) ===
Result	Year	Tournament	Surface	Opponent	Score
Loss	2014	French Open	Clay	(Russia) Daria Kasatkina	7–6^{(7–5)}, 2–6, 3–6

=== Girls' doubles: 1 (runner-up) ===
Result	Year	Tournament	Surface	Partner	Opponents	Score
Loss	2014	Australian Open	Hard	(United Kingdom) Katie Boulter	(Ukraine) Anhelina Kalinina (Russia) Elizaveta Kulichkova	4–6, 2–6

== Notes ==
Preceded by Aleksandra Krunić	Serbian Tennis number one 17 June 2019 – 29 September 2019	Succeeded by Nina Stojanović
