= Lu Jiajing =

Chinese tennis player (born 1989)

Lu Jiajing 逯佳境
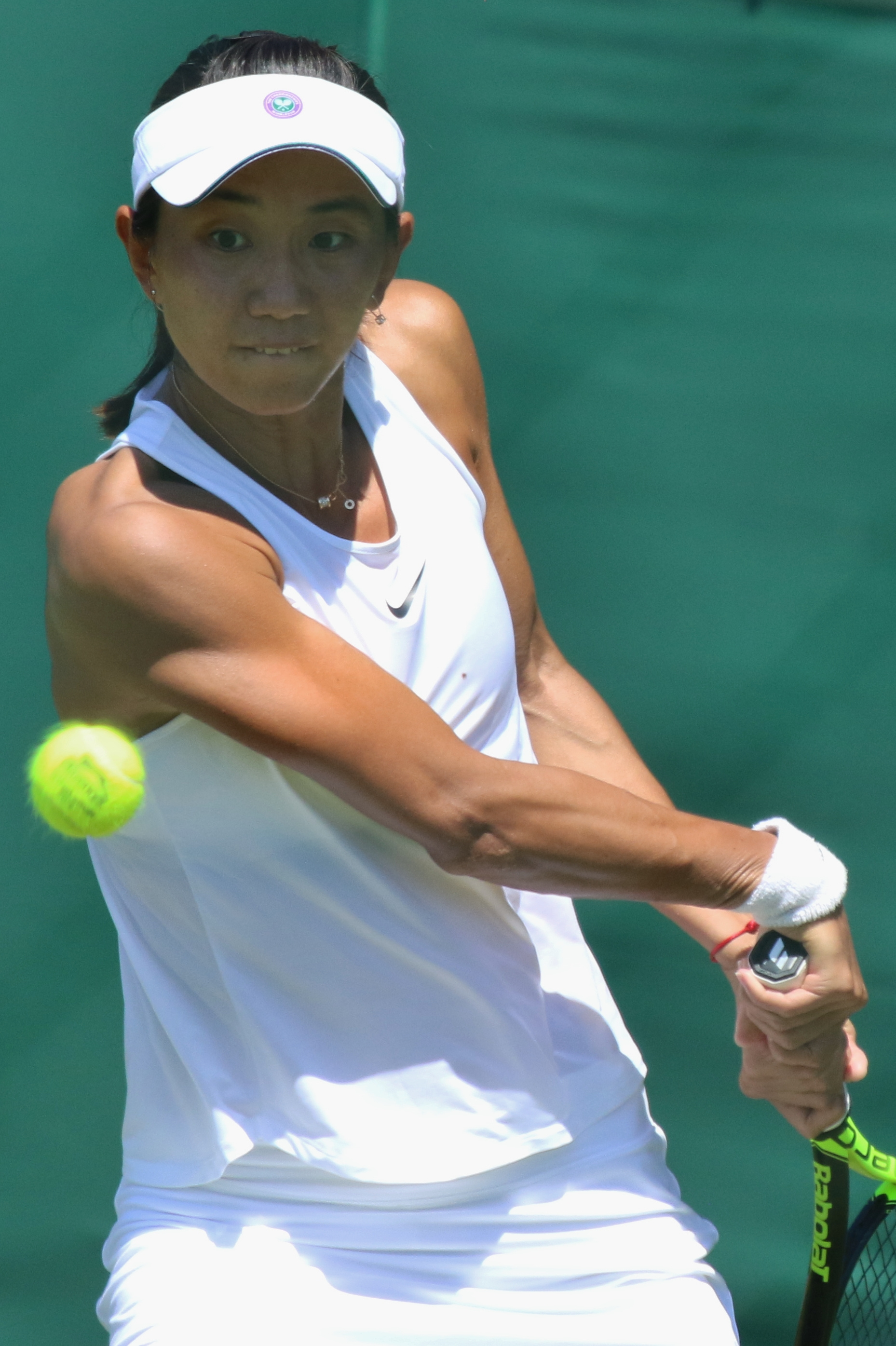
- Lu during the 2018 Wimbledon qualifying
- Country (sports): China
- Born: 18 November 1989 (age 36) Shenyang, China
- Height: 1.73 m (5 ft 8 in)
- Plays: Right-handed
- Prize money: $583,216

Singles
- Career record: 559–420
- Career titles: 19 ITF
- Highest ranking: No. 162 (18 March 2019)
- Current ranking: No. 377 (2 November 2026)

Grand Slam singles results
- Australian Open: Q3 (2021)
- French Open: Q2 (2016)
- Wimbledon: Q1 (2016, 2018, 2021)
- US Open: Q1 (2018, 2019)

Doubles
- Career record: 295–202
- Career titles: 28 ITF
- Highest ranking: No. 139 (29 June 2015)
- Last updated on: 24 August 2026.

Lu Jiajing (Chinese: 逯佳境; pinyin: Lù Jiājìng; Mandarin pronunciation: [lû tɕjá tɕîŋ]; born 18 November 1989) is a Chinese tennis player. On 18 March 2019, she reached her career-high singles ranking of world No. 162. On 29 June 2015, she peaked at No. 139 in the doubles rankings.

Lu has won 19 titles in singles and 28 in doubles on the ITF Circuit.

== Career ==
Partnering Wang Yafan, Lu won her first $50k tournament at Xi'an, defeating Liang Chen and Yang Zhaoxuan in the 2014 final. She also won the doubles title at the Delhi Open in 2014.

Teaming up with Wang Qiang, she reached her first WTA Tour doubles final at the 2017 Hong Kong Tennis Open, losing to top seeds and defending champions Chan Hao-ching and Chan Yung-jan in straight sets.

Lu qualified for the main draw at the newly upgraded WTA 500 2024 Korea Open, losing to Heather Watson in the first round. Having been defeated in qualifying, she entered the main draw at the 2024 Hong Kong Open as a lucky loser, but was eliminated in the first round by Nao Hibino, in three sets.

== WTA Tour finals ==
=== Doubles: 1 (runner-up) ===
Legend WTA 1000 WTA 500 WTA 250 (0–1)	Finals by surface Hard (0–1)

Result	Date	Tournament	Tier	Surface	Partner	Opponents	Score
Loss	Oct 2017	Hong Kong Open, China	International (Note: The WTA International tournaments were reclassified as WTA 250 tournaments in 2021.)	Hard	(China) Wang Qiang	(Chinese Taipei) Chan Hao-ching (Chinese Taipei) Chan Yung-jan	1–6, 1–6

== ITF Circuit finals ==
=== Singles: 31 (19 titles, 12 runner-ups) ===
Legend W50 tournaments $25,000 tournaments $10/15,000 tournaments	Finals by surface Hard (19–12)

Result	W–L	Date	Tournament	Tier	Surface	Opponent	Score
Win	1–0	Aug 2008	ITF Khon Kaen, Thailand	W10	Hard	(Hong Kong) Venise Chan	6–3, 6–4
Win	2–0	Aug 2008	ITF Nonthaburi, Thailand	W10	Hard	(China) Yang Yi	6–3, 6–4
Loss	2–1	Apr 2011	ITF Bangkok, Thailand	W10	Hard	(Japan) Misa Eguchi	1–6, 1–6
Win	3–1	Aug 2011	ITF Westende, Belgium	W10	Hard	(Croatia) Donna Vekić	6–4, 7–6^{(4)}
Win	4–1	Dec 2011	ITF Pune, India	W10	Hard	(Thailand) Nicha Lertpitaksinchai	6–3, 6–2
Win	5–1	May 2012	ITF Tarakan, Indonesia	W25	Hard (i)	(Thailand) Nudnida Luangnam	6–2, 0–6, 6–2
Win	6–1	Dec 2012	ITF Jakarta, Indonesia	W10	Hard	(Indonesia) Ayu Fani Damayanti	1–6, 6–4, 7–5
Win	7–1	Jul 2013	ITF Bangkok, Thailand	W10	Hard	(Hong Kong) Zhang Ling	7–6^{(6)}, 7–5
Win	8–1	Jul 2013	ITF Bangkok, Thailand	W10	Hard	(Thailand) Katherine Westbury	5–7, 6–3, 6–3
Loss	8–2	Nov 2013	ITF Phuket, Thailand	W15	Hard (i)	(Hong Kong) Zhang Ling	6–0, 6–7^{(2)}, 3–6
Loss	8–3	Dec 2013	ITF Hong Kong	W10	Hard	(China) Zhao Di	0–6, 6–4, 6–7^{(8)}
Win	9–3	Sep 2014	ITF Roller Open, Luxembourg	W10	Hard (i)	(Slovakia) Michaela Hončová	6–1, ret.
Win	10–3	Apr 2015	ITF Antalya, Turkey	W10	Hard	(Russia) Anna Kalinskaya	6–2, 6–0
Loss	10–4	Apr 2015	ITF Antalya, Turkey	W10	Hard	(Croatia) Silvia Njirić	1–6, 6–2, 5–7
Win	11–4	May 2015	ITF Balikpapan, Indonesia	W25	Hard	(Japan) Miyu Kato	6–4, 6–4
Win	12–4	Oct 2015	ITF Bangkok, Thailand	W15	Hard	(Thailand) Kamonwan Buayam	7–6^{(3)}, 5–7, 6–3
Win	13–4	Dec 2016	ITF Navi Mumbai, India	W25	Hard	(Slovenia) Tamara Zidanšek	6–3, 6–1
Win	14–4	Jul 2017	ITF Amarante, Portugal	W15	Hard	(Montenegro) Ana Veselinović	6–4, 6–4
Win	15–4	Oct 2017	ITF Hamamatsu, Japan	W25	Hard	(Japan) Miyabi Inoue	6–3, 6–3
Win	16–4	May 2018	Wuhan World Tennis Tour, China	W25	Hard	(China) Yuan Yue	2–6, 6–4, 6–3
Loss	16–5	Jun 2018	ITF Hong Kong	W25	Hard	(India) Karman Thandi	1–6, 2–6
Loss	16–6	Dec 2018	ITF Solapur, India	W25	Hard	(Russia) Marina Melnikova	1–6, 2–6
Loss	16–7	Dec 2018	Pune Open, India	W25	Hard	(Russia) Valeria Savinykh	6–3, 2–6, 6–7^{(7)}
Loss	16–8	Mar 2019	ITF Osaka, Japan	W25	Hard	(Serbia) Ivana Jorović	3–6, 7–5, 2–6
Loss	16–9	Jun 2019	ITF Hong Kong	W25	Hard	(Japan) Erina Hayashi	3–6, 0–3 ret.
Win	17–9	Jul 2019	ITF Ulanqab, China	W25	Hard	(China) Yuan Yue	6–7^{(9)}, 6–3, 6–3
Win	18–9	Nov 2019	ITF Gwalior, India	W25	Hard	(Georgia (country)) Sofia Shapatava	7–5, 6–2
Loss	18–10	Jul 2023	ITF Irvine, United States	W15	Hard	(United States) Haley Giavara	1–6, 3–6
Loss	18–11	Jun 2024	ITF Taizhou, China	W50	Hard	(China) Shi Han	6–2, 5–7, 2–6
Win	19–11	Jun 2025	ITF Hong Kong	W15	Hard	(Thailand) Anchisa Chanta	6–1, 6–1
Loss	19–12	Sep 2026	ITF Kyoto, Japan	W35	Hard (i)	(Japan) Hiromi Abe	6–3, 3–6, 6–7^{(5)}

=== Doubles: 54 (28 titles, 26 runner-ups) ===
Legend $100,000 tournaments $50/60,000 tournaments $25,000 tournaments $10/15,000 tournaments	Finals by surface Hard (22–23) Clay (4–3) Grass (1–0) Carpet (1–0)

Result	W–L	Date	Tournament	Tier	Surface	Partner	Opponents	Score
Win	1–0	Jul 2009	ITF Shenzhen, China	10,000	Hard	(China) Ou Xuanshuo	(China) Hu Yueyue (China) Yuan Yue	6–1, 6–1
Win	2–0	Sep 2010	ITF Makinohara, Japan	25,000	Carpet	(China) Lu Jiaxiang	(Chinese Taipei) Kao Shao-yuan (China) Wang Qiang	7–5, 1–6, [11–9]
Win	3–0	Aug 2011	ITF Charleroi, Belgium	10,000	Clay	(China) Lu Jiaxiang	(Poland) Magdalena Kiszczyńska (Australia) Karolina Wlodarczak	6–3, 6–0
Loss	3–1	Sep 2011	ITF Apeldoorn, Netherlands	10,000	Clay	(China) Lu Jiaxiang	(Netherlands) Kim Kilsdonk (Netherlands) Nicolette van Uitert	4–6, 0–6
Loss	3–2	Nov 2011	ITF Kuching, Malaysia	10,000	Hard	(China) Lu Jiaxiang	(Thailand) Nungnadda Wannasuk (Thailand) Luksika Kumkhum	4–6, 3–6
Win	4–2	Dec 2011	ITF Solapur, India	10,000	Hard	(China) Lu Jiaxiang	(India) Isha Lakhani (India) Sri Peddi Reddy	6–0, 7–5
Win	5–2	Dec 2011	Pune Championships, India	10,000	Hard	(China) Lu Jiaxiang	(Serbia) Tamara Čurović (Ukraine) Anna Shkudun	6–7^{(6)}, 6–1, [10–5]
Win	6–2	Dec 2011	Pune Championships, India (2)	25,000	Hard	(China) Lu Jiaxiang	(Thailand) Varatchaya Wongteanchai (Thailand) Varunya Wongteanchai	6–1, 6–3
Win	7–2	Apr 2012	ITF Antalya, Turkey	10,000	Hard	(China) Lu Jiaxiang	(United Kingdom) Lucy Brown (United Kingdom) Tara Moore	6–1, 6–0
Loss	7–3	Apr 2012	ITF Antalya, Turkey	10,000	Hard	(China) Lu Jiaxiang	(Turkey) Hülya Esen (Turkey) Lütfiye Esen	6–1, 4–6, [8–10]
Win	8–3	May 2012	ITF Jakarta, Indonesia	10,000	Hard	(China) Lu Jiaxiang	(United Kingdom) Anna Fitzpatrick (United Kingdom) Jade Windley	6–4, 6–4
Loss	8–4	Oct 2012	ITF Sharm El Sheikh, Egypt	10,000	Hard	(China) Lu Jiaxiang	(Netherlands) Kim Kilsdonk (Netherlands) Nicolette van Uitert	6–4, 4–6, [3–10]
Loss	8–5	Oct 2012	Lagos Open, Nigeria	25,000	Hard	(China) Lu Jiaxiang	(Switzerland) Conny Perrin (South Africa) Chanel Simmonds	2–6, 6–3, [7–10]
Loss	8–6	Dec 2012	ITF Jakarta, Indonesia	10,000	Hard	(China) Lu Jiaxiang	(Indonesia) Ayu Fani Damayanti (Indonesia) Lavinia Tananta	3–6, 7–6^{(9)}, [6–10]
Loss	8–7	Dec 2012	Pune Championships, India	25,000	Hard	(China) Lu Jiaxiang	(Slovenia) Tadeja Majerič (Switzerland) Conny Perrin	6–3, 5–7, [6–10]
Loss	8–8	Mar 2013	ITF Netanya, Israel	10,000	Hard	(China) Lu Jiaxiang	(Russia) Polina Monova (Belarus) Aliaksandra Sasnovich	1–6, 2–6
Win	9–8	Jul 2013	ITF Bangkok, Thailand	10,000	Hard	(China) Lu Jiaxiang	(Thailand) Napaporn Tongsalee (Thailand) Suchanun Viratprasert	6–4, 6–4
Win	10–8	Jul 2013	ITF Bangkok, Thailand	10,000	Hard	(China) Lu Jiaxiang	(Chinese Taipei) Lee Pei-chi (Thailand) Varunya Wongteanchai	6–4, 6–4
Win	11–8	Nov 2013	ITF Phuket, Thailand	15,000	Hard (i)	(China) Lu Jiaxiang	(Thailand) Peangtarn Plipuech (Thailand) Varunya Wongteanchai	6–4, 7–5
Loss	11–9	Nov 2013	ITF Phuket, Thailand	15,000	Hard (i)	(China) Lu Jiaxiang	(Thailand) Nicha Lertpitaksinchai (Thailand) Peangtarn Plipuech	6–3, 2–6, [8–10]
Win	12–9	Feb 2014	ITF Tinajo, Spain (Lanzarote)	10,000	Hard	(Canada) Petra Januskova	(Belgium) Elise Mertens (Netherlands) Bernice van de Velde	7–5, 5–7, [10–6]
Win	13–9	Jun 2014	ITF Xi'an, China	50,000	Hard	(China) Wang Yafan	(China) Liang Chen (China) Yang Zhaoxuan	6–3, 7–6^{(2)}
Win	14–9	Aug 2014	ITF Oldenzaal, Netherlands	10,000	Clay	(Australia) Alison Bai	(Belgium) Elyne Boeykens (Netherlands) Jainy Scheepens	3–6, 6–4, [10–6]
Win	15–9	Oct 2014	ITF Bangkok, Thailand	25,000	Hard	(China) Liu Chang	(Russia) Daria Gavrilova (Russia) Irina Khromacheva	6–4, 6–3
Win	16–9	Nov 2014	ITF Mumbai, India	25,000	Hard	(India) Ankita Raina	(Thailand) Nicha Lertpitaksinchai (Thailand) Peangtarn Plipuech	6–4, 1–6, [11–9]
Win	17–9	Nov 2014	Delhi Open, India	50,000	Hard	(China) Liu Chang	(Russia) Marina Melnikova (Belgium) Elise Mertens	6–3, 6–0
Win	18–9	Apr 2015	ITF Antalya, Turkey	10,000	Hard	(Ukraine) Alyona Sotnikova	(Italy) Martina Caciotti (Italy) Maria Masini	6–2, 6–0
Win	19–9	Apr 2015	ITF Shenzhen, China	25,000	Hard	(Thailand) Noppawan Lertcheewakarn	(South Korea) Han Na-lae (South Korea) Jang Su-jeong	6–4, 7–5
Win	20–9	May 2015	ITF Nanning, China	25,000	Hard	(China) Liu Chang	(China) Yang Zhaoxuan (China) Ye Qiuyu	1–6, 6–1, [10–8]
Loss	20–10	May 2015	ITF Wuhan, China	50,000	Hard	(China) Liu Chang	(Chinese Taipei) Chang Kai-chen (China) Han Xinyun	0–6, 3–6
Loss	20–11	Jun 2015	ITF Goyang, South Korea	25,000	Hard	(China) Liu Chang	(South Korea) Han Na-lae (South Korea) Yoo Mi	1–6, 5–7
Loss	20–12	Dec 2015	ITF Navi Mumbai, India	25,000	Hard	(Russia) Polina Leykina	(Russia) Anna Morgina (Serbia) Nina Stojanović	3–6, 5–7
Loss	20–13	Apr 2016	ITF Changwon, South Korea	25,000	Hard	(Belgium) Elise Mertens	(South Korea) Han Na-lae (South Korea) Yoo Mi	6–4, 3–6, [7–10]
Loss	20–14	Jul 2016	ITF Aschaffenburg, Germany	25,000	Clay	(Slovenia) Dalila Jakupović	(Germany) Nicola Geuer (Germany) Anna Zaja	4–6, 4–6
Win	21–14	Aug 2016	ITF Tsukuba, Japan	25,000	Hard	(Japan) Akiko Omae	(Japan) Shiho Akita (Japan) Miki Miyamura	6–3, 4–6, [10–6]
Win	22–14	Mar 2017	ITF Mildura, Australia	25,000	Grass	(Thailand) Noppawan Lertcheewakarn	(France) Tessah Andrianjafitrimo (France) Shérazad Reix	6–4, 1–6, [10–8]
Win	23–14	Jun 2017	ITF Wuhan, China	25,000	Hard	(Australia) Alison Bai	(China) Jiang Xinyu (China) Tang Qianhui	6–2, 7–6^{(3)}
Loss	23–15	Jul 2017	ITF Tianjin, China	25,000	Hard	(China) Liu Chang	(China) Jiang Xinyu (China) Tang Qianhui	4–6, 1–6
Loss	23–16	Oct 2017	ITF Hamamatsu, Japan	25,000	Hard	(Japan) Ayaka Okuno	(Japan) Rika Fujiwara (Japan) Kyoka Okamura	2–6, 4–6
Loss	23–17	Feb 2018	ITF Perth, Australia	25,000	Hard	(Australia) Alison Bai	(Australia) Jessica Moore (Australia) Olivia Tjandramulia	5–7, 7–6^{(8)}, [9–11]
Win	24–17	Dec 2018	ITF Solapur, India	25,000	Hard	(Japan) Miyabi Inoue	(United Kingdom) Sarah Beth Grey (Russia) Ekaterina Yashina	6–3, 6–3
Win	25–17	Jan 2021	Open Andrézieux-Bouthéon, France	W60	Hard (i)	(China) You Xiaodi	(Poland) Paula Kania-Choduń (Ukraine) Katarina Zavatska	6–3, 6–4
Loss	25–18	Oct 2021	Berkeley Challenge, United States	W60	Hard	(Chinese Taipei) Liang En-shuo	(United States) Sophie Chang (United States) Angela Kulikov	4–6, 3–6
Loss	25–19	Oct 2021	ITF Redding, United States	W25	Hard	(Slovenia) Dalila Jakupović	(Sweden) Mirjam Björklund (United Kingdom) Katie Swan	3–6, 6–1, [3–10]
Win	26–19	May 2022	ITF Tbilisi, Georgia	W25	Hard	(Bosnia and Herzegovina) Nefisa Berberovic	(Switzerland) Arlinda Rushiti (Switzerland) Tess Sugnaux	6–2, 4–6, [10–7]
Loss	26–20	Jun 2022	Open Madrid Osuna, Spain	W60	Hard	(China) You Xiaodi	(Kazakhstan) Anna Danilina (Russia) Anastasia Tikhonova	4–6, 2–6
Loss	26–21	Jul 2022	ITF Porto, Portugal	W25	Hard	(Australia) Alana Parnaby	(Chinese Taipei) Lee Ya-hsuan (Chinese Taipei) Wu Fang-hsien	7–5, 4–6, [1–10]
Win	27–21	Sep 2022	ITF Trieste, Italy	W25	Clay	(Slovenia) Nika Radišić	(Croatia) Lucija Ćirić Bagarić (Latvia) Diāna Marcinkēviča	7–5, 3–6, [15–13]
Win	28–21	Sep 2022	ITF Saint-Palais-sur-Mer, France	W25	Clay	(Belgium) Magali Kempen	(France) Marine Partaud (Ukraine) Valeriya Strakhova	6–4, 6–4
Loss	28–22	Sep 2022	ITF Pula, Italy	W25	Clay	(Bosnia and Herzegovina) Anita Wagner	(Kazakhstan) Zhibek Kulambayeva (Latvia) Darja Semenistaja	2–6, 2–6
Loss	28–23	Oct 2022	ITF Sozopol, Bulgaria	W25	Hard	(Romania) Cristina Dinu	(China) Ma Yexin (Chinese Taipei) Yang Ya-yi	3–6, 1–6
Loss	28–24	Oct 2022	Trnava Indoor, Slovakia	W25	Hard (i)	(Romania) Oana Georgeta Simion	(Croatia) Lea Bošković (Poland) Weronika Falkowska	6–7^{(7)}, 6–2, [6–10]
Loss	28–25	Nov 2022	ITF Sharm El Sheikh, Egypt	W25	Hard	(Belgium) Magali Kempen	(Netherlands) Arantxa Rus (Serbia) Nina Stojanović	6–7^{(1)}, 2–6
Loss	28–26	May 2023	ITF Nottingham, UK	W25	Hard	(Estonia) Elena Malygina	(United Kingdom) Naiktha Bains (United Kingdom) Maia Lumsden	6–4, 4–6, [6–10]
