= 2015 NCAA Division I tennis championships =

2015 NCAA Division I Tennis Championships
- Date: May 14–25, 2015
- Edition: 70th (Men), 34th (Women)
- Location: Waco, Texas, United States
- Venue: (United States) Hurd Tennis Center (Baylor University)

Champions

Men's singles
- (United States) Ryan Shane, Virginia

Women's singles
- (United States) Jamie Loeb, North Carolina

Men's doubles
- (United Kingdom) Lloyd Glasspool & (Denmark) Søren Hess-Olesen, Texas

Women's doubles
- (Canada) Erin Routliffe & (United States) Maya Jansen, Alabama
- NCAA Division I Tennis Championships

The 2015 NCAA Division I Tennis Championships were the men's and women's tennis tournaments played concurrently from May 14 to May 25, 2015, in Waco, Texas on the campus of Baylor University. It was the 70th edition of the NCAA Division I Men's Tennis Championship* and the 34th edition of the NCAA Division I Women's Tennis Championship*, and the tenth time that the men's and women's tournaments were held at the same venue. It consisted of a men's and women's team, singles, and doubles championships.

The No. 3 seeded Virginia Cavaliers defeated the home-team No. 2 Baylor Bears, 4–2, and then the No. 1 seeded Oklahoma Sooners, 4–1, to take the men's title. This led the Cavaliers to win the Capital One Cup for overall men's sports after Virginia also won the 2014 College Cup in soccer and 2015 College World Series in baseball during the same academic year.

== Men's team championship ==
- Note: Matches from the first round and second round were held at the home courts of the national seeds with the winning team advancing to the championship rounds in Waco, Texas. **Bold** indicates that a team is still active.

=== National seeds ===
1. Oklahoma (Championship Round)
2. Baylor (semifinals)
3. Virginia (National champions)
4. Illinois (third round)
5. TCU (semifinals)
6. Texas A&M (quarterfinals)
7. USC (quarterfinals)
8. Georgia (quarterfinals)
9. Texas (third round)
10. Duke (third round)
11. Ohio State (third round)
12. Wake Forest (third round)
13. North Carolina (quarterfinals)
14. Ole Miss (second round)
15. Virginia Tech (second round)
16. UCLA (third round)

=== Finals bracket ===
**Third round** May 14
1	**Oklahoma**	**4**
16	UCLA	3
8	**Georgia**	**4**
9	Texas	1
5	**TCU**	**4**
12	Wake Forest	0
4	Illinois	2
13	**North Carolina**	**4**
3	**Virginia**	**4**
Columbia	0
6	**Texas A&M**	**4**
11	Ohio State	3
7	**USC**	**4**
10	Duke	0
2	**Baylor**	**4**
South Florida	1

**Quarterfinals**; May 16
1	**Oklahoma**	4
8	Georgia	2
5	**TCU**	4
13	North Carolina	1
3	**Virginia**	4
6	Texas A&M	0
7	USC	2
2	**Baylor**	4

**Semifinals**; May 18
1	**Oklahoma**	**4**
5	TCU	3
3	**Virginia**	**4**
2	Baylor	2

**Finals**; May 19
1	Oklahoma	1
3	**Virginia**	**4**

- Virginia player Mitchell Frank was named the most valuable player

== Women's team championship ==
- Note: Matches from the first round and second round were held at the home courts of the national seeds with the winning team advancing to the championship rounds in Waco, Texas. **Bold** indicates that a team is still active.

=== National seeds ===
1. USC (semifinals)
2. North Carolina (quarterfinals)
3. California (third round)
4. **Vanderbilt** (**National champions**)

5. Florida (quarterfinals)
6. Georgia (semifinals)
7. UCLA (Runner-up)
8. Baylor (quarterfinals)

9. Virginia (third round)
10. Texas A&M (third round)
11. Michigan (third round)
12. Oklahoma State (third round)

13. Alabama (second round)
14. Stanford (quarterfinals)
15. Miami (FL) (third round)
16. Texas Tech (third round)

=== Finals bracket ===
**Round of 16**; May 16
1	**USC**	**4**
16	Texas Tech	0
8	**Baylor**	4
9	Virginia	3
5	**Florida**	**4**
12	Oklahoma State	0
4	**Vanderbilt**	**4**
Clemson	0
3	California	3
14	**Stanford**	**4**
6	**Georgia**	**4**
11	Michigan	2
7	**UCLA**	**4**
10	Texas A&M	1
2	**North Carolina**	**4**
15	Miami (FL)	1

**Quarterfinals**; May 17
1	**USC**	**4**
8	Baylor	1
5	Florida	3
4	**Vanderbilt**	**4**
14	Stanford	2
6	**Georgia**	**4**
7	**UCLA**	**4**
2	North Carolina	1

**Semifinals**; May 18
1	USC	0
4	**Vanderbilt**	**4**
6	Georgia	1
7	**UCLA**	**4**

**Finals**; May 19
4	**Vanderbilt**	**4**
7	UCLA	2

=== All-tournament team ===
- No. 1 Doubles: Lauren Herring/Ellen Perez (Georgia)
- No. 2 Doubles: Catherine Harrison/Kyle McPhillips (UCLA)
- No. 3 Doubles: Marie Casares/Frances Altick (Vanderbilt)
- No. 1 Singles: Robin Anderson (UCLA)
- No. 2 Singles: Astra Sharma (Vanderbilt)
- No. 3 Singles: Jennifer Brady (UCLA)
- No. 4 Singles: Courtney Colton (Vanderbilt)
- No. 5 Singles: Hannah King (Georgia)
- No. 6 Singles: Ashleigh Antal (Vanderbilt)
- Most Outstanding Player: Astra Sharma (Vanderbilt)

== Men's singles championship ==
- Note: Matches from all six rounds were played in Waco, Texas from May 20–25, 2015.

=== National seeds ===
1. (Spain) Axel Alvarez Llamas, Oklahoma (Round of 32)
2. (Germany) Julian Lenz, Baylor (Round of 32)
3. (United States) Mackenzie McDonald, UCLA (Round of 64)
4. (Chile) Guillermo Nuñez, TCU (Round of 32)
5. (Austria) Sebastian Stiefelmeyer, Louisville (Round of 16)
6. (Denmark) Søren Hess-Olesen, Texas (Round of 32)
7. (United States) Noah Rubin, Wake Forest (Championship)
8. (United States) Ryan Shane, Virginia (National Champion)

Players ranked 9th–16th, listed by last name

- (Peru) Nicolas Alvarez, Duke (Round of 32)
- (United States) Gonzales Austin, Vanderbilt (Round of 64)
- (Belgium) Romain Bogaerts, Wake Forest (Round of 32)
- (Germany) Yannick Hanfmann, USC (Round of 16)
- (Germany) Dominik Köpfer, Tulane (Round of 32)
- (Latvia) Miķelis Lībietis, Tennessee (Round of 16)
- (United States) Quentin Monaghan, Notre Dame (semifinals)
- (Canada) Brayden Schnur, North Carolina (Round of 64)

=== Finals bracket ===
- For full bracket:

Round of 16; May 22
(Croatia) T Lupieri (BAY)	1	1
(United States) T Kwiatkowski (UVA)	6	6
5	(Austria) S Stiefelmeyer (UL)	5	4
(United States) W Lin (COL)	7	6
(United States) J Hiltzik (ILL)	7^{7}	2	6
(United Kingdom) L Glasspool (TEX)	6^{3}	6	3
7	(United States) N Rubin (WAKE)	6	6
9-16	(Germany) Y Hanfmann (USC)	2	4
9-16	(Latvia) M Lībietis (TENN)	6	4	4
(New Zealand) C Norrie (TCU)	4	6	6
9-16	(United States) Q Monaghan (ND)	6	6
(Germany) J Sude (OKST)	2	4
8	(United States) R Shane (UVA)	6	6
(United States) J Efferding (TAMU)	4	4
(Brazil) F Soares (TEX)	6	3	6
(United States) J Wang (USC)	3	6	2

Quarterfinals; May 23
(United States) T Kwiatkowski (UVA)	6	5	7
(United States) W Lin (COL)	4	7	5
(United States) J Hiltzik (ILL)	7^{9}	2	2
7	(United States) N Rubin (WAKE)	6^{7}	6	6
(New Zealand) C Norrie (TCU)	6	1	3
9-16	(United States) Q Monaghan (ND)	4	6	6
8	(United States) R Shane (UVA)	7^{7}	4	6
(Brazil) F Soares (TEX)	6^{4}	6	3

Semifinals; May 24
(United States) T Kwiatkowski (UVA)	4	4
7	(United States) N Rubin (WAKE)	6	6
9-16	(United States) Q Monaghan (ND)	6	6^{4}	1
8	(United States) R Shane (UVA)	3	7^{7}	6

Finals; May 25
7	(United States) N Rubin (WAKE)	6	6^{4}	1
8	(United States) R Shane (UVA)	1	7^{7}	6

== Women's singles championship ==
- Note: Matches from all six rounds were played in Waco, Texas from May 20–25, 2015.

=== National seeds ===
1. (United States) Robin Anderson, UCLA (quarterfinals)
2. (Canada) Carol Zhao, Stanford (Championship)
3. (United States) Brooke Austin, Florida (Round of 64)
4. (United States) Maegan Manasse, California (Round of 16)
5. (United States) Lauren Herring, Georgia (Round of 64)
6. (United States) Julie Elbaba, Virginia (Round of 32)
7. (United States) Jamie Loeb, North Carolina (National Champion)
8. (United States) Sydney Campbell, Vanderbilt (Round of 32)

Players ranked 9th–16th, listed by last name

- (United States) Hayley Carter, North Carolina (Round of 64)
- (United States) Danielle Collins, Virginia (quarterfinals)
- (Lithuania) Joana Eidukonyte, Clemson (Round of 16)
- (United States) Lorraine Guillermo, Pepperdine (Round of 64)
- (United States) Julia Jones, Ole Miss (Round of 32)
- (United States) Josie Kuhlman, Florida (semifinals)
- (Mexico) Giuliana Olmos, USC (Round of 32)
- (Germany) Stephanie Wagner, Miami (FL) (semifinals)

=== Finals bracket ===
- For full bracket:

Round of 16; May 22
1	(United States) R Anderson (UCLA)	6	6
(United States) S Santamaria (USC)	1	2
(Serbia) S Gavrilovska (TAM)	1	6	4
9-16	(Germany) S Wagner (MIA)	6	4	6
(United States) J Brady (UCLA)	1	5
9-16	(United States) D Collins (UVA)	6	7
7	(United States) J Loeb (UNC)	6	6
9-16	(Lithuania) J Eidukonyte (CLEM)	3	1
(United Kingdom) N Beazant (RICE)	5	1
(Republic of Ireland) S Lohan (MIA)	7	6
9-16	(United States) J Kuhlman (UF)	6	6
4	(United States) M Manasse (CAL)	4	1
(Bosnia and Herzegovina) E Burgic (BAY)	4	1
(United States) C Van Nguyen (UCLA)	6	6
(Hungary) Z Susanyi (CAL)	2	0
2	(Canada) C Zhao (STAN)	6	6

Quarterfinals; May 23
1	(United States) R Anderson (UCLA)	6	4	2
9-16	(Germany) S Wagner (MIA)	3	6	6
9-16	(United States) D Collins (UVA)	3	6	4
7	(United States) J Loeb (UNC)	6	1	6
(Republic of Ireland) S Lohan (MIA)	3	4
9-16	(United States) J Kuhlman (UF)	6	6
(United States) C Van Nguyen (UCLA)	4	5
2	(Canada) C Zhao (STAN)	6	7

Semifinals; May 24
9-16	(Germany) S Wagner (MIA)	6	4	2
7	(United States) J Loeb (UNC)	4	6	6
9-16	(United States) J Kuhlman (UF)	6	4	0
2	(Canada) C Zhao (STAN)	2	6	6

Finals; May 25
7	(United States) J Loeb (UNC)	6	4	6
2	(Canada) C Zhao (STAN)	2	6	1

== Men's doubles championship ==
- Note: All matches, including those from the first round and the round of 16, were played in Waco, Texas from May 20–25, 2015.

=== National seeds ===
1. (Australia) Ben Wagland / (United States) Austin Smith, Georgia (quarterfinals)
2. (Ecuador) Roberto Quiroz / (Germany) Yannick Hanfmann, USC (Round of 32)
3. (United States) Luca Corinteli / (United States) Ryan Shane, Virginia (Round of 32)
4. (Latvia) Miķelis Lībietis / (United States) Hunter Reese, Tennessee (quarterfinals)

Players ranked 5th–8th in no particular order

- (Germany) Julian Lenz / (Paraguay) Diego Galeano, Baylor (semifinals)
- (United Kingdom) Julian Cash / (France) Florian Lakat, Mississippi State (Round of 32)
- (United States) Kevin Metka / (Germany) Ralf Steinbach, Ohio State (Round of 32)
- (United States) Gonzales Austin / (Australia) Rhys Johnson, Vanderbilt (Round of 32)

=== Finals bracket ===
- For full bracket:

Quarterfinals; May 23
1	(Australia) B Wagland (UGA) (United States) A Smith (UGA)	2	3
(Brazil) H Dojas (TEX) (Brazil) F Soares (TEX)	6	6
(United States) H Jadun (MSU) (United States) JP Mullane (MSU)	6	6
(Bolivia) B Arias (LSU) (United States) J Daigle (LSU)	3	4
5-8	(Germany) J Lenz (BAY) (Paraguay) D Galeano (BAY)	6	6	6
4	(Latvia) M Lībietis (TENN) (United States) H Reese (TENN)	7^{5}	3	4
(India) A Kadhe (OKST) (Germany) J Sude (OKST)	4	2
(United Kingdom) L Glasspool (TEX) (Denmark) S Hess-Olsen (TEX)	6	6

Semifinals; May 24
(Brazil) H Dojas (TEX) (Brazil) F Soares (TEX)	6	6
(United States) H Jadun (MSU) (United States) JP Mullane (MSU)	3	2
5-8	(Germany) J Lenz (BAY) (Paraguay) D Galeano (BAY)	6	3	6
(United Kingdom) L Glasspool (TEX) (Denmark) S Hess-Olsen (TEX)	2	6	7^{3}

Championship; May 25
(Brazil) H Dojas (TEX) (Brazil) F Soares (TEX)	1	6	3
(United Kingdom) L Glasspool (TEX) (Denmark) S Hess-Olsen (TEX)	6	3	6

== Women's doubles championship ==
- Note: All matches, including those from the first round and the round of 16, were played in Waco, Texas from May 20–25, 2015.

=== National seeds ===
1. (Canada) Erin Routliffe / (United States) Maya Jansen, Alabama (National champions)
2. (Canada) Carol Zhao / (United States) Taylor Davidson, Stanford (quarterfinals)
3. (United States) Catherine Harrison / (United States) Kyle McPhillips, UCLA (Round of 32)
4. (Indonesia) Beatrice Gumulya / (Indonesia) Jessy Rompies, Clemson (quarterfinals)

Players ranked 5th–8th in no particular order

- (United States) Emily Flickinger / (Netherlands) Pleun Burgmans, Auburn (Round of 32)
- (United States) Maegan Manasse / (United States) Denise Starr, California (Round of 16)
- (Hungary) Zsofi Susanyi / (Czech Republic) Klara Fabikova, California (Championship)
- (United States) Brooke Austin / (United States) Kourtney Keegan, Florida (semifinals)

=== Finals bracket ===
- For full bracket:

Quarterfinals
1	(Canada) E Routliffe (ALA) (United States) M Jansen (ALA)	4	7	6
(Bosnia and Herzegovina) E Burgic (BAY) (United States) B Shankle (BAY)	6	5	1
4	(Indonesia) B Gumulya (CLEM) (Indonesia) J Rompies (CLEM)	6	4	4
(United States) C Doyle (STAN) (United States) E Tsay (STAN)	4	6	6
5-8	(Hungary) Z Susanyi (CAL) (Czech Republic) K Fabikova (CAL)	6	6
(United States) A Antal (VAN) (Australia) A Sharma (VAN)	2	2
5-8	(United States) B Austin (UF) (United States) K Keegan (UF)	6	1	6
2	(Canada) C Zhao (STAN) (United States) T Davidson (STAN)	0	6	4

Semifinals
1	(Canada) E Routliffe (ALA) (United States) M Jansen (ALA)	5	6	6
(United States) C Doyle (STAN) (United States) E Tsay (STAN)	7	3	0
5-8	(Hungary) Z Susanyi (CAL) (Czech Republic) K Fabikova (CAL)	3	6	6
5-8	(United States) B Austin (UF) (United States) K Keegan (UF)	6	4	4

Championship
1	(Canada) E Routliffe (ALA) (United States) M Jansen (ALA)	6	6	6
5-8	(Hungary) Z Susanyi (CAL) (Czech Republic) K Fabikova (CAL)	2	7^{5}	3
