= 2016 NCAA Division I tennis championships =

2016 NCAA Division I Tennis Championships
- Date: May 19–30, 2016
- Edition: 71st (Men), 35th (Women)
- Location: Tulsa, Oklahoma, United States
- Venue: (United States) Michael D. Case Tennis Center (University of Tulsa)
- NCAA Division I Tennis Championships

The 2016 NCAA Division I Tennis Championships, consisting of men's and women's singles and doubles tournaments, were played concurrently from May 19 to May 30, 2016 in Tulsa, Oklahoma on the campus of the University of Tulsa. The event was the 71st edition of the NCAA Division I Men's Tennis Championship and the 35th edition of the NCAA Division I Women's Tennis Championship. 2016 marked the 11th instance that the men's and women's tournaments were held at the same venue.

Stanford defeated Oklahoma State in the women's team final, 4-3, extending their record number of national titles to 18 and winning their first since 2016. Danielle Collins won her second singles championship for Virginia after previously holding the trophy in 2014. Florida's Brooke Austin and Kourtney Keegan claimed the doubles title with a 6-2, 6-0 victory in the final over California.

On the men's side, Virginia won its third team championship in four years. The Cavaliers reprised the result of the 2015 final by defeating Oklahoma, 4-1 – the Sooners' third consecutive loss in the final round. UCLA's Mackenzie McDonald swept the individual honors, dropping one set each en route to the singles title (over finalist Ohio State's Mikael Torpegaard) and doubles title with Martin Redlicki.

== Men's team championship ==
Note: Matches from the First Round and Second Round are held at the home courts of the national seeds with the winning team advancing to the championship rounds in Tulsa, Oklahoma. Bold indicates that a team is still active.

=== National seeds ===
1. Virginia (National Champions)
2. North Carolina (quarterfinals)
3. UCLA (quarterfinals)
4. TCU (round of16)
5. Ohio State (quarterfinals)
6. Wake Forest (round of 16)
7. Georgia (semifinals)
8. Texas Tech (second round)
9. Florida (quarterfinals)
10. USC (round of 16)
11. Oklahoma (Runner-up)
12. Texas A&M (second round)
13. California (semifinals)
14. Northwestern (second round)
15. Illinois (second round)
16. Oklahoma State (round of 16)

=== Bracket ===
**First Round**; May 13–14; National Seed Home Courts
1	**Virginia***	**4**
49*	Monmouth	1
17*	Columbia	3
33*	**Penn State**	**4**
17*	**Arkansas**	**4**
33*	Wichita State	2
49*	Bryant	0
16	**Oklahoma State***	**4**
9	**Florida***	**4**
49*	North Florida	0
17*	**South Florida**	**4**
33*	St. John's (NY)	0
17*	**SMU**	**5**
33*	Washington	0
49*	New Mexico State	0
8	**Texas Tech***	**4**
5	**Ohio State***	**5**
49*	Tennessee Tech	0
17*	Kentucky	3
33*	**Virginia Tech**	**4**
17*	**Texas**	**4**
33*	Lamar	0
49*	George Washington	0
12	**Texas A&M***	**4**
13	**California***	**4**
49*	Army	0
17*	**Ole Miss**	**4**
33*	Denver	3
17*	Rice
33*	LSU
49*	Jackson State	3
4	**TCU***	**4**
3	**UCLA***	**4**
49*	Weber State	0
17*	**San Diego**	**4**
33*	Vanderbilt	0
17*	**Stanford**	**4**
33*	Notre Dame	1
49*	Valparaiso	1
14	**Northwestern***	**4**
11	**Oklahoma***	**4**
49*	Texas–Arlington	0
23	Tulsa	1
33*	**Oregon**	**4**
17*	**Michigan**	**4**
33*	East Tennessee State	3
49*	Coastal Carolina	0
6	**Wake Forest***	**4**
7	**Georgia***	**4**
49*	South Carolina State	0
17*	Florida State	3
33*	**Baylor**	**4**
17*	**Georgia Tech**	**4**
33*	UC Santa Barbara	1
49*	UNLV	0
10	**USC***	**4**
15	**Illinois***	**4**
49*	Western Michigan	1
17*	**Mississippi State**	**4**
33*	Memphis	1
17*	**Tulane**	**4**
33*	Dartmouth	0
49*	College of Charleston	0
2	**North Carolina***	**4**

**Second Round**; May 14–15; National Seed Home Courts
1	**Virginia***	**4**
33*	**Penn State**	1
17*	Arkansas	0
16	**Oklahoma State***	**4**
9	**Florida***	**4**
17*	South Florida	0
17*	**SMU**	**4**
8	Texas Tech*	2
5	**Ohio State**	**4**
33*	Virginia Tech	3
17*	**Texas**	**4**
12	Texas A&M*	3
13	**California***	**4**
17*	Ole Miss	0
33*	LSU	0
4	**TCU***	**4**
3	**UCLA***	**4**
17*	San Diego	0
17*	**Stanford**	**4**
14	Northwestern*	3
11	**Oklahoma***	**4**
33*	Oregon	2
17*	Michigan	2
6	**Wake Forest***	**4**
7	**Georgia***	**4**
33*	Baylor	1
17*	Georgia Tech	2
10	**USC***	**4**
15	Illinois*	0
17*	**Mississippi State**	**4**
17*	Tulane	0
2	**North Carolina***	**4**

**Round of 16**; May 20; Tulsa, OK
1	**Virginia***	**4**
16	Oklahoma State*	2
9	**Florida***	**4**
17*	SMU	0
5	**Ohio State***	**4**
17*	Texas	3
13	**California***	**4**
4	TCU*	3
3	**UCLA***	**4**
17*	Stanford	2
11	**Oklahoma***	**4**
6	Wake Forest*	0
7	**Georgia***	**4**
10	USC*	3
17*	Mississippi State	0
2	**North Carolina***	**4**

**Quarterfinals**; May 22; Tulsa, OK
1	**Virginia***	**4**
9	Florida*	0
5	Ohio State*	2
13	**California***	**4**
3	UCLA*	3
11	**Oklahoma***	**4**
7	**Georgia***	**4**
2	North Carolina*	0

**Semifinals**; May 23; Tulsa, OK
1	**Virginia***	**4**
13	California*	0
11	**Oklahoma***	**4**
7	Georgia*	3

**Finals**; May 24; Tulsa, OK
1	Virginia*	**4**
11	Oklahoma*	1

== Women's team championship ==
- Note: Matches from the First Round and Second Round are held at the home courts of the national seeds with the winning team advancing to the championship rounds in Tulsa, Oklahoma. **Bold** indicates that a team is still active.

=== National seeds ===
1. California (semifinals)
2. Florida (round of 16)
3. North Carolina (round of 16)
4. Ohio State (quarterfinals)

5. Georgia (round of 16)
6. Vanderbilt (semifinals)
7. Miami (FL) (round of 16)
8. Pepperdine (quarterfinals)

9. Duke (second round)
10. Michigan (quarterfinals)
11. Auburn (round of 16)
12. Oklahoma State (Runner-up)

13. South Carolina (second round)
14. Virginia (quarterfinals)
15. **Stanford** **(National Champions)**
16. Texas Tech (round of 16)

=== Bracket ===
**First Round**; May 13, 2016; National Seed Home Court
1	**California***	**4**
49*	UTRGV	0
17*	Kansas	3
33*	**UC Santa Barbara**	**4**
17*	**Mississippi State**	**4**
33*	Virginia Tech	0
49*	Boston U.	0
16	**Texas Tech***	**4**
9	**Duke***	**4**
49*	VCU	0
17*	**Texas**	**4**
33*	William & Mary	2
17*	**USC**	**4**
33*	UNLV	0
49*	Idaho	0
8	**Pepperdine***	**4**
5	**Georgia***	**4**
49*	North Florida	0
17*	Wake Forest	2
33*	**Baylor**	**4**
17*	**Tulsa**	**4**
33*	Arkansas	1
49*	Albany (NY)	0
12	**Oklahoma State***	**4**
13	**South Carolina***	**4**
49*	Winthrop	2
17*	**Georgia Tech**	**4**
33*	Princeton	1
17*	**UCLA**	**4**
33*	Notre Dame	1
49*	Youngstown State	0
4	**Ohio State***	**4**
3	**North Carolina***	**4**
49*	East Tennessee State	0
17*	**Northwestern**	**4**
33*	Ole Miss	0
17*	**LSU**	**4**
33*	Columbia	0
49*	Fairleigh Dickinson	0
14	**Virginia***	**4**
11	**Auburn***	**4**
49*	Alcorn State	0
17*	**Arizona State**	**4**
33*	NC State	1
17*	Clemson	1
33*	**Rice**	**4**
49*	SIU Edwardsville	0
6	**Vanderbilt***	**4**
7	**Miami (FL)***	**5**
49*	Quinnipiac	0
17*	Wichita State	3
33*	**TCU**	**4**
17*	**Kentucky**	**4**
33*	Xavier	1
49*	Ball State	0
10	**Michigan***	**4**
15	**Stanford***	**4**
49*	Texas A&M–CC	0
17*	**Texas A&M**	**4**
33*	Denver	0
17*	**Syracuse**	**4**
33*	Georgia State	3
49*	South Carolina State	0
2	**Florida***	**4**

**Second Round**; May 14, 2016; National Seed Home Court
1	**California***	**4**
33*	UC Santa Barbara	0
17*	Mississippi State	2
16	**Texas Tech***	**4**
9	Duke*	2
17*	**Texas**	**4**
17*	USC	2
8	**Pepperdine***	**4**
5	**Georgia***	**4**
33*	Baylor	0
17*	Tulsa	0
12	**Oklahoma State***	**4**
13	South Carolina*	0
17*	**Georgia Tech**	**4**
17*	UCLA	1
4	**Ohio State***	**4**
3	**North Carolina***	**4**
17*	Northwestern	2
17*	LSU	2
14	**Virginia***	**4**
11	**Auburn***	**4**
17*	Arizona State	2
33*	Rice	0
6	**Vanderbilt***	**4**
7	**Miami (FL)***	**4**
33*	TCU	0
17*	Kentucky	1
10	**Michigan***	**4**
15	**Stanford***	**4**
17*	Texas A&M	3
17*	Syracuse	0
2	**Florida***	**4**

**Round of 16**; May 19, 2016; Tulsa, OK
1	**California***	**4**
16	Texas Tech*	0
17*	Texas	0
8	**Pepperdine***	**4**
5	Georgia*	0
12	**Oklahoma State***	**4**
17*	Georgia Tech	2
4	**Ohio State***	**4**
3	North Carolina*	2
14	**Virginia***	**4**
11	Auburn*	0
6	**Vanderbilt***	**4**
7	Miami (FL)*	3
10	**Michigan***	**4**
15	**Stanford***	**4**
2	Florida*	3

**Quarterfinals**; May 21, 2016; Tulsa, OK
1	**California***	**4**
8	Pepperdine*	2
12	**Oklahoma State***	**4**
4	Ohio State*	2
14	Virginia*	2
6	**Vanderbilt***	**4**
10	Michigan*	3
15	**Stanford***	**4**

**Semifinals**; May 23, 2016; Tulsa, OK
1	California*	3
12	**Oklahoma State***	**4**
6	Vanderbilt*	3
15	**Stanford***	**4**

**Finals**; May 24, 2016; Tulsa, OK
12	Oklahoma State*	3
15	**Stanford***	**4**

== Men's singles championship ==
=== National seeds ===
1. (Denmark) Mikael Torpegaard, Ohio State (final)
2. (Dominican Republic) Roberto Cid, South Florida (quarterfinals)
3. (Germany) Dominik Köpfer, Tulane (third round)
4. (Australia) Aleksandar Vukic, Illinois (quarterfinals)
5. (United Kingdom) Cameron Norrie, TCU (semifinals)
6. (United States) Mackenzie McDonald, UCLA (National Champion)
7. (United States) Christopher Eubanks, Georgia Tech (first round)
8. (United States) Ryan Shane, Virginia (third round)

Players seeded 9th–16th, listed by last name

- (United States) Tom Fawcett, Stanford (second round)
- (Ecuador) Diego Hidalgo, Florida (first round)
- (United States) Thai-Son Kwiatkowski, Virginia (quarterfinals)
- (Germany) Julian Lenz, Baylor (first round)
- (Zimbabwe) Benjamin Lock, Florida State (second round)
- (Tunisia) Skander Mansouri, Wake Forest (third round)
- (Portugal) Joao Monteiro, Virginia Tech (semifinals)
- (United States) Austin Smith, Georgia (first round)

=== Finals ===
Quarterfinals
1	Mikael Torpegaard (Ohio State)	6	6
Petros Chrysochos (Wake Forest)	3	0
9-16	Thai-Son Kwiatkowski (Virginia)	6	2	1
5	Cameron Norrie (TCU)	4	6	6
9-16	Joao Monteiro (Virginia Tech)	6	5	7^{7}
4	Aleksandar Vukic (Illinois)	3	7	6^{3}
6	Mackenzie McDonald (UCLA)	6	6
2	Roberto Cid (South Florida)	3	2

Semifinals
1	Mikael Torpegaard	6	6
5	Cameron Norrie	3	4
9-16	Joao Monteiro	2	6	3
6	Mackenzie McDonald	6	3	6

Finals
1	Mikael Torpegaard	3	3
6	Mackenzie McDonald	6	6

=== Top half ===
First Round
1	Mikael Torpegaard (Ohio State)	6	6^{3}	7
David Biosca (ETSU)	3	7^{7}	5
Collin Altamirano (Virginia)	4	4
William Bushamuka (Kentucky)	6	6
9-16	Tom Fawcett (Stanford)	6	6
Nicolas Alvarez (Duke)	2	3
Brayden Schnur (North Carolina)	2	2
Gustav Hansson (Ole Miss)	6	6
7	Christopher Eubanks (Georgia Tech)	4	6	4
Shane Vinsant (Texas A&M)	6	4	6
Jared Hiltzik (Illinois)	4	7^{7}	6
Piotr Lomacki (Miami (FL))	6	6^{2}	0
9-16	Julian Lenz (Baylor)	6^{9}	6^{4}
Petros Chrysochos (Wake Forest)	7^{11}	7^{7}
Shawn Hadavi (Columbia)	3	6	0
Alfredo Perez (Florida)	6	3	6

Second Round
1	M Torpegaard	7^{9}	6
W Bushamuka	6^{7}	3
9-16	T Fawcett	3	6	4
G Hansson	6	2	6
S Vinsant	4	2
J Hiltzik	6	6
P Chrysochos	7	3	7^{7}
A Perez	5	6	6^{3}

Third Round
1	M Torpegaard	6	6
G Hansson	4	4
J Hiltzik	6	4	3
P Chrysochos	4	6	6

Quarterfinals
1	M Torpegaard	6	6
P Chrysochos	3	0

First Round
3	Dominik Köpfer (Tulane)	6	6
Max de Vroome (USC)	4	4
Gergely Madarasz (Purdue)	2	6^{3}
Martin Redlicki (UCLA)	6	7^{7}
9-16	Thai-Son Kwiatkowski (Virginia)	6	6
Stefan Lindmark (Ole Miss)	2	2
Wayne Montgomery (Georgia)	6	6
Sam Matheson (Liberty)	1	3
5	Cameron Norrie (TCU)	6	6
Michael Redlicki (Arkansas)	2	2
Alec Adamson (UC Davis)	6^{5}	6	5
Sam Shropshire (Northwestern)	7^{7}	4	7
9-16	Diego Hidalgo (Florida)	2	4
Dominic Cotrone (Florida Southern)	6	6
Florian Lakat (California)	6	1	6^{4}
Gabriel Friedrich (South Carolina)	2	6	7^{7}

Second Round
3	D Koepfer	1	6	6
M Redlicki	6	3	4
9-16	T Kwiatkowski	6	6
W Montgomery	2	0
5	C Norrie	6	1	6
S Shropshire	1	6	1
D Cotrone	7	6
G Friedrich	5	3

Third Round
3	D Koepfer	2	1
9-16	T Kwiatkowski	6	6
5	C Norrie	6	2	6
D Cotrone	4	6	2

Quarterfinals
9-16	T Kwiatkowski	6	2	1
5	C Norrie	4	6	6

=== Bottom half ===
First Round
Konrad Zieba (Northwestern)	2	4
Or Ram-Harel (Tulsa)	6	6
Nick Crystal (USC)	4	3
9-16	Joao Monteiro (Virginia Tech)	6	6
Simon Norenius (NC State)	5	2
Elliott Orkin (Florida)	7	6
Andre Goransson (California)	2	6^{0}
8	Ryan Shane (Virginia)	6	7^{7}
Santtu Leskinnen (UNC Wilmington)	2	6	3
Ronnie Schneider (North Carolina)	6	4	6
Daniel Valent (Vanderbilt)	1	2
9-16	Benjamin Lock (Florida State)	6	6
Rishab Agarwal (Mississippi State)	3	6	7^{7}
Jack Findel-Hawkins (North Florida)	6	4	6^{1}
Julian Cash (Oklahoma State)	2	4
4	Aleks Vukic (Illinois)	6	6

Second Round
O Ram-Harel	2	7	2
9-16	J Monteiro	6	5	6
E Orkin	6	4	1
8	R Shane	3	6	6
R Schneider	3	7^{7}	6
9-16	B Lock	6	6^{5}	2
R Agarwal	6^{8}	6	6^{6}
4	A Vukic	7^{10}	4	7^{8}

Third Round
9-16	J Monteiro	1	7	6
8	R Shane	6	5	2
R Schneider	4	1
4	A Vukic	6	6

Quarterfinals
9-16	J Monteiro	6	5	7^{7}
4	A Vukic	3	7	6^{3}

First Round
Alex Rybakov (TCU)	6	6
Hugo Di Feo (Ohio State)	3	2
Arthur Rinderknech (Texas A&M)	6	4	0
9-16	Skander Mansouri (Wake Forest)	1	6	3
Quentin Monaghan (Notre Dame)	6	6
Strong Kirchheimer (Northwestern)	4	0
Ryotaro Matsamura (Kentucky)	0	2
6	Mackenzie McDonald (UCLA)	6	6
Jordan Daigle (LSU)	7^{7}	4	3
Uros Petronijevic (San Diego)	6^{2}	6	6
Axel Alvarez Llamas (Oklahoma)	7	3	6
9-16	Austin Smith (Georgia)	5	6	2
Brett Clark (North Carolina)	2	2
Mazen Osama (Alabama)	6	6
Felipe Soares (Texas Tech)	6	0	5
2	Roberto Cid (South Florida)	4	6	7

Second Round
A Rybakov	6^{4}	4
9-16	S Mansouri	7^{7}	6
Q Monaghan	4	1
6	M McDonald	6	6
U Petronijevic	4	6	7
A Alvarez Llamas	6	4	5
M Osama	0	3
2	R Cid	6	6

Third Round
9-16	S Mansouri	1	2
6	M McDonald	6	6
U Petronijevic	4	3
2	R Cid	6	6

Quarterfinals
6	M McDonald	6	6
2	R Cid	3	2

== Women's singles championship ==
=== Finals ===
Quarterfinals
1	Hayley Carter (North Carolina)	4	6	6
Katarina Adamovic (Oklahoma State)	6	1	0
9-16	Breaunna Addison (Texas)	2	4
8	Sinead Lohan (Miami (FL))	6	6
7	Luisa Stefani (Pepperdine)	6	6
Kennedy Shaffer (Georgia)	1	4
6	Jasmine Lee (Mississippi State)	5	3
2	Danielle Collins (Virginia)	7	6

Semifinals
1	Hayley Carter	1	7	6
8	Sinead Lohan	6	5	2
7	Luisa Stefani	6^{7}	4
2	Danielle Collins	7^{9}	6

Championship
1	Hayley Carter	3	2
2	Danielle Collins	6	6

=== Bracket ===
First Round
1	Hayley Carter (North Carolina)	6	7
Lauren Chypyha (Wisconsin)	2	5
Caroline Dailey (South Carolina)	0	3
Catherine Harrison (UCLA)	6	6
9-16	Julia Elbaba (Virginia)	6	6
Aldila Sutjiadi (Kentucky)	2	4
Georgiana Patrasc (Mississippi State)	6	6
Daneika Borthwick (Florida State)	4	0
5	Ellen Perez (Georgia)	6	6
Kanika Vaidya (Columbia)	0	4
Katarina Adamovic (Oklahoma State)	2	6	6
Sydney Campbell (Vanderbilt)	6	2	4
9-16	Belinda Woolcock (Florida)	7^{8}	7^{9}
Maddie Lipp (Northwestern)	6^{6}	6^{7}
Erin Routliffe (Alabama)	6	2	6
Lauren Marker (Arizona)	3	6	2

Second Round
1	H Carter	6	7
C Harrison	1	5
9-16	J Elbaba	6	6
G Patrasc	2	3
5	E Perez	3	6^{5}
K Adamovic	6	7^{7}
9-16	B Woolcock	6	5	6
E Routliffe	0	7	1

Third Round
1	H Carter	6	6
9-16	J Elbaba	2	2
K Adamovic	6	4	6
9-16	B Woolcock	3	6	2

Quarterfinals
1	H Carter	4	6	6
K Adamovic	6	1	0

First Round
3	Francesca Di Lorenzo (Ohio State)	6	7
Kourtney Keegan (Florida)	0	5
Johnnise Renaud (Georgia Tech)	6^{1}	6	6
Alizee Michaud (Auburn)	7^{7}	1	2
9-16	Breaunna Addison (Texas)	6	6
Giuliana Olmos (USC)	4	0
Joana Eidukonyte (Clemson)	6	7
Alexandria Stiteler (South Alabama)	2	5
8	Sinead Lohan (Miami (FL))	6	6
Brienne Minor (Michigan)	3	4
Jessica Golovin (LSU)	6	7^{7}
Mayar Sherif Ahmed (Fresno State)	4	6^{4}
9-16	Klara Fabikova (California)	6	2	6
Beatriz Machado Santos (Missouri)	3	6	3
Desirae Krawczyk (Arizona State)	6	5	6
Quinn Gleason (Notre Dame)	0	7	4

Second Round
1	F Di Lorenzo	6	6
J Renaud	1	3
9-16	B Addison	6	6
J Eidukonyte	3	2
8	S Lohan	6	6
J Golovin	2	4
9-16	K Fabikova	3	6^{5}
D Krawczyk	6	7^{7}

Third Round
1	F Di Lorenzo	6	6^{2}	0
9-16	B Addison	2	7^{7}	6
8	S Lohan	6	6
D Krawczyk	4	4

Quarterfinals
9-16	B Addison	2	4
8	S Lohan	6	6

First Round
Elizaveta Nemchinov (William & Mary)	6	7^{7}
Andie Daniell (Alabama)	4	6^{2}
Yulia Shupenia (DePaul)	3	4
9-16	Frances Altick (Vanderbilt)	6	6
Sadie Hammond (Tennessee)	6	5	7
Ayan Broomfield (Clemson)	2	7	5
Gabriela Porubin (Wichita State)	5	3
7	Luisa Stefani (Pepperdine)	7	6
Whitney Kay (North Carolina)	1	4
Kennedy Shaffer (Georgia)	6	6
Joana Vale Costa (LSU)	6	4	3
9-16	Ronit Yurovsky (Michigan)	1	6	6
Andie Dikosavljevic (Auburn)	2	0
Paige Hourigan (Georgia Tech)	6	6
Katherine Ip (Rice)	6	5	6
4	Brooke Austin (Florida)	4	7	4

Second Round
E Nemchinov	0	2
9-16	F Altick	6	6
S Hammond	0	2
7	L Stefani	6	6
K Shaffer	6	3	7^{7}
9-16	R Yurovsky	3	6	6^{4}
P Hourigan	6	4	5
K Ip	2	6	7

Third Round
9-16	F Altick	6	2	3
7	L Stefani	4	6	6
K Shaffer	6	3	6
K Ip	4	6	2

Quarterfinals
7	L Stefani	6	6
K Shaffer	1	4

First Round
Kimmy Guerin (Wake Forest)	6^{5}	7^{7}	6^{7}
Kaitlyn McCarthy (Duke)	7^{7}	6^{5}	7^{9}
Maeva Razakasoa (Long Beach State)	2	3
9-16	Jasmine Lee (Mississippi State)	6	6
Saana Saarteinen (Tulsa)	3	2
Yuliya Lysa (Arkansas)	6	6
Caroline Brinson (Georgia)	3	2
6	Maegan Manasse (California)	6	6
Arianne Hartono (Ole Miss)	6	6
Martina Frantova (NC State)	1	4
Saska Gavrilovska (Texas A&M)	7^{10}	6
9-16	Stephanie Wagner (Miami (FL))	6^{8}	4
Astra Sharma (Vanderbilt)	3	1
Jessie Aney (North Carolina)	6	6
Anna Shkudun (Syracuse)	2	0
2	Danielle Collins (Virginia)	6	6

Second Round
K McCarthy	6^{3}	3
9-16	J Lee	7^{7}	6
Y Lysa	6^{6}	1
6	M Manasse	7^{8}	6
A Hartono	3	7^{7}	6
S Gavrilovska	6	6^{5}	1
J Aney	3	2
2	D Collins	6	6

Third Round
9-16	J Lee	6	7^{7}
6	M Manasse	4	6^{0}
A Hartono	4	0
2	D Collins	6	6

Quarterfinals
9-16	J Lee	5	3
2	D Collins	7	6

== Men's doubles championship ==
=== Finals ===
Semifinals
-	EAST TENNESSEE STATE; David Biosca; Rogerio Ribeiro	2	7	[7]
-	TEXAS A&M; Arthur Rinderknech; Jackson Withrow	6	5	[10]
NOTRE DAME; Alex Lawson; Quentin Monaghan	5	7^{7}	[8]
2	UCLA; Mackenzie McDonald; Martin Redlicki	7	6^{5}	[10]

Championship
A Rinderknech; J Withrow	4	1
2	M McDonald; M Redlicki	6	6

=== Bracket ===
==== Top half ====
First Round
1	FLORIDA; Diego Hidalgo; Gordon Watson	6	3	10
STANFORD; Tom Fawcett; Maciek Romanowicz	3	6	7
EAST TENNESSEE STATE; David Biosca; Rogerio Ribeiro	6	6
NEW MEXICO; Hayden Sabatka; Bart Van Leijsen	4	4
5-8	VANDERBILT; Rhys Johnson; Cameron Klinger	3	6	9
OHIO STATE; Herkko Pollanen; Mikael Torpegaard	6	4	11
OLE MISS; Zvonimir Babic; Filip Kraljevic	1	3
NORTH CAROLINA; Jack Murray; Brayden Schnur	6	6
3	VIRGINIA; Luca Corinteli; Ryan Shane	2	4
TEXAS A&M; Arthur Rinderknech; Jackson Withrow	6	6
NORTH FLORIDA; Jack Findel-Hawkins; Yannick Zuern	7^{7}	3	7
TEXAS TECH; Hugo Dojas; Felipe Soares	6^{5}	6	10
5-8	LSU; Boris Arias; Jordan Daigle	6	6
COLUMBIA; Shawn Hadavi; Richard Pham	3	2
ARKANSAS; Giammarco Micolani; Michael Redlicki	6^{4}	3
WAKE FOREST; Skander Mansouri; Christian Seraphim	7^{7}	6

Second Round
1	D Hidalgo; G Watson	4	5
D Biosca; R Ribeiro	6	7
H Pollanen; M Torpegaard	4	2
J Murray; B Schnur	6	6
A Rinderknech; J Withrow	5	6	[13]
H Dojas; F Soares	7	3	[11]
5-8	B Arias; J Daigle	4	4
S Mansouri; C Seraphim	6	6

Quarterfinals
D Biosca; R Ribeiro	6	7^{9}
J Murray; B Schnur	2	6^{7}
A Rinderknech; J Withrow	3	6	[10]
S Mansouri; C Seraphim	6	3	[6]

Semifinals
D Biosca; R Ribeiro	2	7	[7]
A Rinderknech; J Withrow	6	5	[10]

==== Bottom half ====
First Round
SOUTH FLORIDA; Sasha Gozun; Vadym Kalyuzhnyy	6	1	[8]
DENVER; Henry Craig; Alex Gasson	1	6	[10]
EASTERN KENTUCKY; Alex Alvaro; Ramon van Flymen	4	4
5-8	CALIFORNIA; Filip Bergevi; Florian Lakat	6	6
GEORGIA; Austin Smith; Ben Wagland	6^{5}	6	[11]
TULANE; Chi-Shan Jao; Dominik Koepfer	7^{7}	2	[13]
NOTRE DAME; Alex Lawson; Quentin Monaghan	6	6
4	ALABAMA; Korey Lovett; Mazen Osama	4	3
SAN DIEGO; Jordan Angus; Filip Vittek	5	7^{7}	[10]
VIRGINIA TECH; Andreas Bjerrehus; Joao Monteiro	7	6^{4}	[6]
FLORIDA STATE; Benjamin Lock; Marco Nunez	1	6	6
5-8	OKLAHOMA STATE; Julian Cash; Arjun Kadhe	6	2	[10]
RICE; Tommy Bennett; David Warren	6	3	7
TENNESSEE; Jack Schipanski; Luis Valero	3	6	[10]
VIRGINIA; Thai-Son Kwiatkowski; Mac Styslinger	2	6^{3}
2	UCLA; Mackenzie McDonald; Martin Redlicki	6	7^{7}

Second Round
H Craig; A Gasson	4	6	[11]
5-8	F Bergevi; F Lakat	6	2	[13]
C Jao; D Koepfer	7^{7}	6^{6}	[8]
A Lawson; Q Monaghan	6^{5}	7^{8}	[10]
J Angus; F Vittek	5	3
5-8	J Cash; A Kadhe	7	6
J Schipanski; L Valero	3	3
2	M McDonald; M Redlicki	6	6

Quarterfinals
5-8	F Bergevi; F Lakat	3	5
A Lawson; Q Monaghan	6	7
5-8	J Cash; A Kadhe	6^{4}	5
2	M McDonald; M Redlicki	7^{7}	7

Semifinals
A Lawson; Q Monaghan	5	7^{7}	[8]
2	M McDonald; M Redlicki	7	6^{5}	[10]

== Women's doubles championship ==
=== Finals ===
Semifinals
1	NORTH CAROLINA; Hayley Carter; Whitney Kay	4	6	[7]
4	CALIFORNIA; Maegan Manasse; Denise Starr	6	4	[10]
3	FLORIDA; Brooke Austin; Kourtney Keegan	4	6	[10]
5-8	UCLA; Catherine Harrison; Kyle McPhillips	6	3	[5]

Championship
4	M Manasse; D Starr	2	0
3	B Austin; K Keegan	6	6

=== Bracket ===
==== Top half ====
First Round
1	NORTH CAROLINA; Hayley Carter; Whitney Kay	6	6
WASHINGTON; Nour Abbes; Miki Kobayashi	3	2
UC SANTA BARBARA; Palina Dubavets; Stefani Stojic	6	6
DEPAUL; Rebeca Mitrea; Yulia Shupenia	1	2
5-8	AUBURN; Pleun Burgmans; Alizee Michaud	5	6	[10]
MICHIGAN; Brienne Minor; Mira Ruder-Hook	7	2	[4]
OHIO STATE; Miho Kowase; Anna Sanford	4	6	[5]
SOUTH CAROLINA; Hadley Berg; Paige Cline	6	1	[10]
4	CALIFORNIA; Maegan Manasse; Denise Starr	2	6	[10]
OLE MISS; Mai El Kamash; Arianne Hartono	6	1	[8]
PEPPERDINE; Apichaya Runglerdkriangkrai; Luisa Stefani	6	2	[10]
GEORGIA TECH; Paige Hourigan; Kendal Woodard	2	6	[5]
5-8	STANFORD; Taylor Davidson; Caroline Doyle	2	6^{0}
FRESNO STATE; Mayar Sherif Ahmed; Rana Sherif Ahmed	6	7^{7}
ARIZONA; Shayne Austin; Lauren Marker	3	5
VIRGINIA; Danielle Collins; Meghan Kelley	6	7

Second Round
1	H Carter; W Kay	4	6	[10]
P Dubavets; S Stojic	6	4	[7]
5-8	P Burgmans; A Michaud	5	6	[4]
H Berg; P Cline	7	2	[10]
4	M Manasse; D Starr	2	6	[10]
A Runglerdkriangkrai; L Stefani	6	4	[6]
M Sherif Ahmed; R Sherif Ahmed	6	6
D Collins; M Kelley	4	2

Quarterfinals
1	H Carter; W Kay	6	6
H Berg; P Cline	1	2
4	M Manasse; D Starr	6	7
M Sherif Ahmed; R Sherif Ahmed	1	5

Semifinals
1	H Carter; W Kay	4	6	[7]
4	M Manasse; D Starr	6	4	[10]

==== Bottom half ====
First Round
ARIZONA STATE; Alexandra Osborne; Ebony Panoho	6	6
DARTMOUTH; Kristina Mathis; Taylor Ng	3	4
TEXAS; Breaunna Addison; Danielle Wagland	6	6
5-8	USC; Giuliana Olmos; Gabby Smith	4	1
VANDERBILT; Sydney Campbell; Courtney Colton	6^{4}	5
PEPPERDINE; Matea Cutura; Christine Maddox	7^{7}	7
SYRACUSE; Gabriela Knutson; Valeria Salazar Garza	4	3
3	FLORIDA; Brooke Austin; Kourtney Keegan	6	6
BAYLOR; Kiah Generette; Blair Shankle	6	6
GEORGIA; Mariana Gould; Ellen Perez	4	4
RICE; Katherine Ip; Emily Smith	5	7	[4]
5-8	UCLA; Catherine Harrison; Kyle McPhillips	7	5	[10]
MISSISSIPPI STATE; Madison Harrison; Kristina Vozniak	7	5	[10]
NORTHWESTERN; Alex Chatt; Maddie Lipp	6	0	[8]
STANFORD; Melissa Lord; Carol Zhao	6	2	[9]
2	KENTUCKY; Mami Adachi; Aldila Sutjiadi	2	6	[11]

Second Round
A Osborne; E Panoho	1	6	[10]
B Addison; D Wagland	6	4	[6]
M Cutura; C Maddox	3	6^{4}
3	B Austin; K Keegan	6	7^{7}
K Generette; B Shankle	1	6^{2}
5-8	C Harrison; K McPhillips	6	7^{7}
M Harrison; K Vozniak	6	1	[6]
2	M Adachi; A Sutjiadi	4	6	[10]

Quarterfinals
A Osborne; E Panoho	4	1
3	B Austin; K Keegan	6	6
5-8	C Harrison; K McPhillips	6	6
2	M Adachi; A Sutjiadi	0	2

Semifinals
3	B Austin; K Keegan	4	6	[10]
5-8	C Harrison; K McPhillips	6	3	[5]
