= 2016 US Open – Women's doubles =

Women's doubles
- 2016 US Open

Final
- Champions: (United States) Bethanie Mattek-Sands (Czech Republic) Lucie Šafářová
- Runners-up: (France) Caroline Garcia (France) Kristina Mladenovic
- Score: 2–6, 7–6^{(7–5)}, 6–4

Details
- Draw: 64 (7 WC )
- Seeds: 16

Events
Singles	men	women		boys	girls
Doubles	men	women	mixed	boys	girls
WC Singles	men	women	quad
WC Doubles	men	women	quad
Legends	men	women	mixed
← 2015 ·	US Open	· 2017 →

Martina Hingis and Sania Mirza were the defending champions, but chose not to participate together. Mirza teamed up with Barbora Strýcová, but lost in the quarterfinals to Caroline Garcia and Kristina Mladenovic. Hingis played alongside CoCo Vandeweghe, but lost in the semifinals to Garcia and Mladenovic.

Bethanie Mattek-Sands and Lucie Šafářová won the title, defeating Garcia and Mladenovic in the final, 2–6, 7–6^{(7–5)}, 6–4. It was their third Grand Slam title together.

== Seeds ==
1. (France) Caroline Garcia / (France) Kristina Mladenovic (final)
2. (Chinese Taipei) Chan Hao-ching / (Chinese Taipei) Chan Yung-jan (second round)
3. (Hungary) Tímea Babos / (Kazakhstan) Yaroslava Shvedova (third round)
4. (Czech Republic) Andrea Hlaváčková / (Czech Republic) Lucie Hradecká (third round)
5. (Russia) Ekaterina Makarova / (Russia) Elena Vesnina (semifinals)
6. (Switzerland) Martina Hingis / (United States) CoCo Vandeweghe (semifinals)
7. (India) Sania Mirza / (Czech Republic) Barbora Strýcová (quarterfinals)
8. (Germany) Julia Görges / (Czech Republic) Karolína Plíšková (third round)

9. (United States) Raquel Atawo / (United States) Abigail Spears (first round)
10. (United States) Vania King / (Romania) Monica Niculescu (third round)
11. (China) Xu Yifan / (China) Zheng Saisai (third round)
12. (United States) Bethanie Mattek-Sands / (Czech Republic) Lucie Šafářová (champions)
13. (Slovenia) Andreja Klepač / (Slovenia) Katarina Srebotnik (quarterfinals)
14. (Croatia) Darija Jurak / (Australia) Anastasia Rodionova (second round)
15. (Netherlands) Kiki Bertens / (Sweden) Johanna Larsson (second round)
16. (Czech Republic) Barbora Krejčíková / (Czech Republic) Kateřina Siniaková (quarterfinals)

== Draw ==
=== Key ===
- Q = Qualifier
- WC = Wild card
- LL = Lucky loser
- Alt = Alternate
- SE = Special exempt
- PR = Protected ranking
- ITF = ITF entry
- JE = Junior exempt
- w/o = Walkover
- r = Retired
- d = Defaulted
- SR = Special ranking

=== Finals ===
Quarterfinals
1	(France) Caroline Garcia (France) Kristina Mladenovic	7^{7}	6
7	(India) Sania Mirza (Czech Republic) Barbora Strýcová	6^{3}	1
16	(Czech Republic) Barbora Krejčíková (Czech Republic) Kateřina Siniaková	1	2
6	(Switzerland) Martina Hingis (United States) CoCo Vandeweghe	6	6
12	(United States) Bethanie Mattek-Sands (Czech Republic) Lucie Šafářová	6	6
WC	(United States) Asia Muhammad (United States) Taylor Townsend	1	2
5	(Russia) Ekaterina Makarova (Russia) Elena Vesnina	6	6
13	(Slovenia) Andreja Klepač (Slovenia) Katarina Srebotnik	4	2

Semifinals
1	(France) Caroline Garcia (France) Kristina Mladenovic	6	6
6	(Switzerland) Martina Hingis (United States) CoCo Vandeweghe	3	4
12	(United States) Bethanie Mattek-Sands (Czech Republic) Lucie Šafářová	6	7^{7}
5	(Russia) Ekaterina Makarova (Russia) Elena Vesnina	2	6^{4}

Final
1	(France) Caroline Garcia (France) Kristina Mladenovic	6	6^{5}	4
12	(United States) Bethanie Mattek-Sands (Czech Republic) Lucie Šafářová	2	7^{7}	6

=== Top half ===
==== Section 1 ====
First round
1	(France) C Garcia (France) K Mladenovic	6	6
Alt	(Japan) K Nara (Japan) N Osaka	3	3
(United Kingdom) N Broady (United States) S Rogers	6	6^{6}	6
(Ukraine) K Bondarenko (Chinese Taipei) C-j Chuang	0	7^{8}	3
(Japan) E Hozumi (Japan) M Kato	6	6
(Poland) M Linette (China) Q Wang	4	2
(France) A Cornet (France) P Parmentier	4	7^{7}	5
14	(Croatia) D Jurak (Australia) An Rodionova	6	6^{5}	7
9	(United States) R Atawo (United States) A Spears	2	5
PR	(Netherlands) M Krajicek (United Kingdom) H Watson	6	7
(Colombia) M Duque Mariño (Puerto Rico) M Puig	3	7	4
(United States) N Gibbs (Japan) N Hibino	6	5	6
(Switzerland) V Golubic (United States) N Melichar	6	6
(United States) M Brengle (Germany) T Maria	2	2
WC	(United States) J Hart (United States) E Shibahara	3	2
7	(India) S Mirza (Czech Republic) B Strýcová	6	6

Second round
1	(France) C Garcia (France) K Mladenovic	6	6
(United Kingdom) N Broady (United States) S Rogers	3	1
(Japan) E Hozumi (Japan) M Kato	6	6
14	(Croatia) D Jurak (Australia) An Rodionova	4	3
PR	(Netherlands) M Krajicek (United Kingdom) H Watson	6	3	5
(United States) N Gibbs (Japan) N Hibino	2	6	7
(Switzerland) V Golubic (United States) N Melichar	2	6^{5}
7	(India) S Mirza (Czech Republic) B Strýcová	6	7^{7}

Third round
1	(France) C Garcia (France) K Mladenovic	6	6
(Japan) E Hozumi (Japan) M Kato	2	3
(United States) N Gibbs (Japan) N Hibino	4	5
7	(India) S Mirza (Czech Republic) B Strýcová	6	7

Quarterfinals
1	(France) C Garcia (France) K Mladenovic	7^{7}	6
7	(India) S Mirza (Czech Republic) B Strýcová	6^{3}	1

==== Section 2 ====
First round
4	(Czech Republic) A Hlaváčková (Czech Republic) L Hradecká	6	6
(Czech Republic) D Allertová (Germany) A-L Friedsam	3	1
(Croatia) M Lučić-Baroni (United States) M Sanchez	6	6
(Switzerland) B Bencic (Belgium) K Flipkens	4	4
(Montenegro) D Kovinić (Poland) A Rosolska	2	6	7
(Turkey) Ç Büyükakçay (Latvia) A Sevastova	6	4	5
(Australia) Ar Rodionova (Ukraine) E Svitolina	3	4
16	(Czech Republic) B Krejčíková (Czech Republic) K Siniaková	6	6
11	(China) Y Xu (China) S Zheng	7	6
(Georgia (country)) O Kalashnikova (Russia) A Panova	5	2
(Serbia) A Krunić (Romania) A Mitu	6	2	0
(New Zealand) M Erakovic (Spain) A Parra Santonja	2	6	6
(Argentina) M Irigoyen (Poland) P Kania	6	6
(Kazakhstan) Y Putintseva (Germany) C Witthöft	1	3
(Germany) A-L Grönefeld (Czech Republic) K Peschke	6	1	2
6	(Switzerland) M Hingis (United States) C Vandeweghe	4	6	6

Second round
4	(Czech Republic) A Hlaváčková (Czech Republic) L Hradecká	6	4	7
(Croatia) M Lučić-Baroni (United States) M Sanchez	4	6	5
(Montenegro) D Kovinić (Poland) A Rosolska	6^{3}	2
16	(Czech Republic) B Krejčíková (Czech Republic) K Siniaková	7^{7}	6
11	(China) Y Xu (China) S Zheng	6	7^{7}
(New Zealand) M Erakovic (Spain) A Parra Santonja	3	6^{5}
(Argentina) M Irigoyen (Poland) P Kania	5	3
6	(Switzerland) M Hingis (United States) C Vandeweghe	7	6

Third round
4	(Czech Republic) A Hlaváčková (Czech Republic) L Hradecká	5	5
16	(Czech Republic) B Krejčíková (Czech Republic) K Siniaková	7	7
11	(China) Y Xu (China) S Zheng	4	6	2
6	(Switzerland) M Hingis (United States) C Vandeweghe	6	4	6

Quarterfinals
16	(Czech Republic) B Krejčíková (Czech Republic) K Siniaková	1	2
6	(Switzerland) M Hingis (United States) C Vandeweghe	6	6

=== Bottom half ===
==== Section 3 ====
First round
8	(Germany) J Görges (Czech Republic) Ka Plíšková	6	6
(China) C Liang (China) Y Wang	2	4
WC	(United States) J Cako (United States) D Lao	5	6	3
(United States) L Chirico (United States) A Riske	7	4	6
(Spain) L Arruabarrena (Ukraine) O Savchuk	6	0
(Germany) A Beck (Belgium) Y Wickmayer	2	0^{r}
(Japan) S Aoyama (Japan) M Ninomiya	4	2
12	(United States) B Mattek-Sands (Czech Republic) L Šafářová	6	6
15	(Netherlands) K Bertens (Sweden) J Larsson	6	6
(Japan) M Doi (United States) V Lepchenko	4	2
WC	(United States) A Muhammad (United States) T Townsend	6	6
WC	(United States) B Austin (United States) K Keegan	2	2
(Romania) I-C Begu (Romania) R Olaru	7^{7}	4	3
(Latvia) J Ostapenko (Germany) A Petkovic	6^{5}	6	6
WC	(United States) C Bellis (United States) J Boserup	3	0
3	(Hungary) T Babos (Kazakhstan) Y Shvedova	6	6

Second round
8	(Germany) J Görges (Czech Republic) Ka Plíšková	6	6
(United States) L Chirico (United States) A Riske	1	3
(Spain) L Arruabarrena (Ukraine) O Savchuk	4	1
12	(United States) B Mattek-Sands (Czech Republic) L Šafářová	6	6
15	(Netherlands) K Bertens (Sweden) J Larsson	4	4
WC	(United States) A Muhammad (United States) T Townsend	6	6
(Latvia) J Ostapenko (Germany) A Petkovic	2	4
3	(Hungary) T Babos (Kazakhstan) Y Shvedova	6	6

Third round
8	(Germany) J Görges (Czech Republic) Ka Plíšková	6	5	3
12	(United States) B Mattek-Sands (Czech Republic) L Šafářová	2	7	6
WC	(United States) A Muhammad (United States) T Townsend	0	6	6
3	(Hungary) T Babos (Kazakhstan) Y Shvedova	6	4	3

Quarterfinals
12	(United States) B Mattek-Sands (Czech Republic) L Šafářová	6	6
WC	(United States) A Muhammad (United States) T Townsend	1	2

==== Section 4 ====
First round
5	(Russia) E Makarova (Russia) E Vesnina	6	4
(Germany) M Barthel (Germany) L Siegemund	3	2^{r}
(Australia) S Stosur (China) S Zhang	6	2	6
(Serbia) J Janković (Switzerland) X Knoll	4	6	4
(Ukraine) L Kichenok (Ukraine) N Kichenok	6	6
WC	(United States) S Crawford (United States) J Pegula	3	2
WC	(United States) A Weinhold (United States) C Whoriskey	2	7	5
10	(United States) V King (Romania) M Niculescu	6	5	7
13	(Slovenia) A Klepač (Slovenia) K Srebotnik	6	6
(Slovakia) AK Schmiedlová (Czech Republic) R Voráčová	2	2
(Australia) D Gavrilova (Russia) D Kasatkina	6	6
(Canada) G Dabrowski (Spain) MJ Martínez Sánchez	1	4
(Russia) A Kudryavtseva (Germany) S Lisicki	1	6	6
Alt	(Thailand) V Wongteanchai (China) Z Yang	6	3	3
Alt	(China) X Han (China) K Zhang	2	2
2	(Chinese Taipei) H-c Chan (Chinese Taipei) Y-j Chan	6	6

Second round
5	(Russia) E Makarova (Russia) E Vesnina	3	7^{8}	6
(Australia) S Stosur (China) S Zhang	6	6^{6}	4
(Ukraine) L Kichenok (Ukraine) N Kichenok	3	1
10	(United States) V King (Romania) M Niculescu	6	6
13	(Slovenia) A Klepač (Slovenia) K Srebotnik	6	2	7
(Australia) D Gavrilova (Russia) D Kasatkina	1	6	5
(Russia) A Kudryavtseva (Germany) S Lisicki	6	0	6
2	(Chinese Taipei) H-c Chan (Chinese Taipei) Y-j Chan	2	6	3

Third round
5	(Russia) E Makarova (Russia) E Vesnina	2	6	6
10	(United States) V King (Romania) M Niculescu	6	1	2
13	(Slovenia) A Klepač (Slovenia) K Srebotnik	7^{7}	6
(Russia) A Kudryavtseva (Germany) S Lisicki	6^{3}	0

Quarterfinals
5	(Russia) E Makarova (Russia) E Vesnina	6	6
13	(Slovenia) A Klepač (Slovenia) K Srebotnik	4	2

== Other entry information ==
=== Wild cards ===
- (United States) Brooke Austin / (United States) Kourtney Keegan (Note: Winner of the women's doubles tournament in the 2016 NCAA Division I Tennis Championships)
- (United States) Catherine Bellis / (United States) Julia Boserup
- (United States) Jacqueline Cako / (United States) Danielle Lao
- (United States) Samantha Crawford / (United States) Jessica Pegula
- (United States) Jada Hart / (United States) Ena Shibahara
- (United States) Asia Muhammad / (United States) Taylor Townsend
- (United States) Ashley Weinhold / (United States) Caitlin Whoriskey

=== Protected ranking ===
- (Netherlands) Michaëlla Krajicek / (United Kingdom) Heather Watson

=== Alternates ===
- (China) Han Xinyun / (China) Zhang Kailin
- (Japan) Kurumi Nara / (Japan) Naomi Osaka
- (Thailand) Varatchaya Wongteanchai / (China) Yang Zhaoxuan
