= 2016 US Open – Men's singles =

Men's singles
- 2016 US Open

Final
- Champion: (Switzerland) Stan Wawrinka
- Runner-up: (Serbia) Novak Djokovic
- Score: 6–7^{(1–7)}, 6–4, 7–5, 6–3

Details
- Draw: 128 (16 Q / 8 WC )
- Seeds: 32

Events
Singles	men	women		boys	girls
Doubles	men	women	mixed	boys	girls
← 2015 ·	US Open	· 2017 →

Stan Wawrinka defeated defending champion Novak Djokovic in the final, 6–7^{(1–7)}, 6–4, 7–5, 6–3 to win the men's singles tennis title at the 2016 US Open. It was his third major title; on all three occasions, he defeated the world No. 1 player in the final. Wawrinka saved a match point en route to the title, against Dan Evans in the third round. Djokovic was the third man in the Open Era (after Ivan Lendl and Andy Murray) to lose five finals at the same major.

This was the first US Open since 1999 not to feature five-time champion Roger Federer. This was the first major that Tomáš Berdych missed since his debut at the 2003 US Open, ending his streak of 52 consecutive major appearances (sixth-highest of all-time).

No American man was seeded inside the top 16 for the first time since the introduction of the seeding system in 1930. Steve Johnson was the top-seeded American man at No. 19.

== Seeds ==
1. (Serbia) Novak Djokovic (final)
2. (United Kingdom) Andy Murray (quarterfinals)
3. (Switzerland) Stan Wawrinka (champion)
4. (Spain) Rafael Nadal (fourth round)
5. (Canada) Milos Raonic (second round)
6. (Japan) Kei Nishikori (semifinals)
7. (Croatia) Marin Čilić (third round)
8. (Austria) Dominic Thiem (fourth round, retired)
9. (France) Jo-Wilfried Tsonga (quarterfinals, retired)
10. (France) Gaël Monfils (semifinals)
11. (Spain) David Ferrer (third round)
12. (Belgium) David Goffin (first round)
13. (France) Richard Gasquet (first round)
14. (Australia) Nick Kyrgios (third round, retired)
15. (Spain) Roberto Bautista Agut (third round)
16. (Spain) Feliciano López (second round)

17. (Australia) Bernard Tomic (first round)
18. (Uruguay) Pablo Cuevas (second round)
19. (United States) Steve Johnson (second round)
20. (United States) John Isner (third round)
21. (Croatia) Ivo Karlović (fourth round)
22. (Bulgaria) Grigor Dimitrov (fourth round)
23. (South Africa) Kevin Anderson (third round)
24. (France) Lucas Pouille (quarterfinals)
25. (Germany) Philipp Kohlschreiber (first round, retired)
26. (United States) Jack Sock (fourth round)
27. (Germany) Alexander Zverev (second round)
28. (Slovakia) Martin Kližan (first round)
29. (United States) Sam Querrey (first round)
30. (France) Gilles Simon (second round)
31. (Spain) Albert Ramos Viñolas (second round)
32. (France) Benoît Paire (second round)

Click on the seed number of a player to go to their draw section.

== Draw ==
=== Key ===
- Q = Qualifier
- WC = Wild card
- LL = Lucky loser
- Alt = Alternate
- ITF = ITF entry
- PR = Protected ranking
- SR = Special ranking
- SE = Special exempt
- JE = Junior exempt
- JR = Junior Accelerator Programme entrant
- CO = College Accelerator Programme entrant
- NG = Next Gen Accelerator Program entrant
- w/o = Walkover
- r = Retired
- d = Defaulted

=== Finals ===
Quarterfinals
1	(Serbia) Novak Djokovic	6	6	0
9	(France) Jo-Wilfried Tsonga	3	2	0^{r}
24	(France) Lucas Pouille	4	3	3
10	(France) Gaël Monfils	6	6	6
WC	(Argentina) Juan Martín del Potro	6^{5}	6	3	2
3	(Switzerland) Stan Wawrinka	7^{7}	4	6	6
6	(Japan) Kei Nishikori	1	6	4	6	7
2	(United Kingdom) Andy Murray	6	4	6	1	5

Semifinals
1	(Serbia) Novak Djokovic	6	6	3	6
10	(France) Gaël Monfils	3	2	6	2
3	(Switzerland) Stan Wawrinka	4	7	6	6
6	(Japan) Kei Nishikori	6	5	4	2

Final
1	(Serbia) Novak Djokovic	7^{7}	4	5	3
3	(Switzerland) Stan Wawrinka	6^{1}	6	7	6

=== Top half ===
==== Section 1 ====
First round
1	(Serbia) N Djokovic	6	5	6	6
PR	(Poland) J Janowicz	3	7	2	1
(Czech Republic) J Veselý	7^{7}	4	2	6	7
Q	(India) S Myneni	6^{5}	6	6	2	5
WC	(United States) B Fratangelo	3	4	4
(Argentina) G Pella	6	6	6
(Russia) M Youzhny	6	6	6
28	(Slovakia) M Kližan	2	1	1
20	(United States) J Isner	3	4	7^{7}	6	7^{7}
WC	(United States) F Tiafoe	6	6	6^{5}	2	6^{3}
(Australia) J Thompson	7	6	6^{5}	4	5
Q	(Belgium) S Darcis	5	3	7^{7}	6	7
(Slovakia) L Lacko	4	6	6	3	0^{r}
WC	(United States) E Escobedo	6	4	4	6	0
(United Kingdom) K Edmund	6	6	6
13	(France) R Gasquet	2	2	3

Second round
1	(Serbia) N Djokovic	w/o
(Czech Republic) J Veselý
(Argentina) G Pella	2	1	6^{3}
(Russia) M Youzhny	6	6	7^{7}
20	(United States) J Isner	6	6	6^{10}	6
Q	(Belgium) S Darcis	3	4	7^{12}	3
WC	(United States) E Escobedo	5	4	4
(United Kingdom) K Edmund	7	6	6

Third round
1	(Serbia) N Djokovic	4
(Russia) M Youzhny	2^{r}
20	(United States) J Isner	4	6	2	6^{5}
(United Kingdom) K Edmund	6	3	6	7^{7}

Fourth round
1	(Serbia) N Djokovic	6	6	6
(United Kingdom) K Edmund	2	1	4

==== Section 2 ====
First round
9	(France) J-W Tsonga	6	6	6
Q	(Argentina) G Andreozzi	3	4	4
WC	(Australia) J Duckworth	4	7	6	4	6
(Netherlands) R Haase	6	5	3	6	3
(Canada) V Pospisil	6	6	6
LL	(Slovakia) J Kovalík	1	3	3
(Japan) Y Nishioka	3	5	4
23	(South Africa) K Anderson	6	7	6
26	(United States) J Sock	7^{7}	7	3	1	6
(United States) T Fritz	6^{3}	5	6	6	4
Q	(Germany) M Zverev	6	7^{8}	4	6
(France) P-H Herbert	4	6^{6}	6	0
(Ukraine) S Stakhovsky	6	3	2	6	7^{7}
(Portugal) G Elias	1	6	6	3	6^{4}
(Brazil) R Dutra Silva	4	5	1
7	(Croatia) M Čilić	6	7	6

Second round
9	(France) J-W Tsonga	6	3	6	6
WC	(Australia) J Duckworth	4	6	3	4
(Canada) V Pospisil	6^{3}	4	4
23	(South Africa) K Anderson	7^{7}	6	6
26	(United States) J Sock	6	6	6
Q	(Germany) M Zverev	1	1	2
(Ukraine) S Stakhovsky	1	2	3
7	(Croatia) M Čilić	6	6	6

Third round
9	(France) J-W Tsonga	6	6	7^{7}
23	(South Africa) K Anderson	3	4	6^{4}
26	(United States) J Sock	6	6	6
7	(Croatia) M Čilić	4	3	3

Fourth round
9	(France) J-W Tsonga	6	6	6^{7}	6
26	(United States) J Sock	3	3	7^{9}	2

==== Section 3 ====
First round
4	(Spain) R Nadal	6	6	6
(Uzbekistan) D Istomin	1	4	2
(France) S Robert	2	6	4	3
(Italy) A Seppi	6	3	6	6
(Brazil) T Bellucci	4	6	1	6^{6}
(Russia) A Kuznetsov	6	3	6	7^{8}
PR	(France) J Benneteau	6	3	3	6	1
31	(Spain) A Ramos Viñolas	3	6	6	2	6
24	(France) L Pouille	3	6	6	6
(Kazakhstan) M Kukushkin	6	2	4	2
Q	(Brazil) G Clezar	6	6^{6}	2	4
Q	(Switzerland) M Chiudinelli	2	7^{8}	6	6
PR	(United States) B Baker	6	7^{8}	4	2	2
(Argentina) F Delbonis	3	6^{6}	6	6	6
(Spain) G García López	5	1	7^{7}	6^{3}
15	(Spain) R Bautista Agut	7	6	6^{5}	7^{7}

Second round
4	(Spain) R Nadal	6	7	6
(Italy) A Seppi	0	5	1
(Russia) A Kuznetsov	7	6	7^{7}
31	(Spain) A Ramos Viñolas	5	4	6^{5}
24	(France) L Pouille	4	3	7^{8}	6	6
Q	(Switzerland) M Chiudinelli	6	6	6^{6}	2	0
(Argentina) F Delbonis	7	2	3	2
15	(Spain) R Bautista Agut	5	6	6	6

Third round
4	(Spain) R Nadal	6	6	6
(Russia) A Kuznetsov	1	4	2
24	(France) L Pouille	3	7	2	7	6
15	(Spain) R Bautista Agut	6	5	6	5	1

Fourth round
4	(Spain) R Nadal	1	6	4	6	6^{6}
24	(France) L Pouille	6	2	6	3	7^{8}

==== Section 4 ====
First round
10	(France) G Monfils	6	6	7^{7}
(Luxembourg) G Müller	4	2	6^{5}
Q	(Czech Republic) J Šátral	4	3	6	6	6
WC	(United States) M McDonald	6	6	3	2	2
Q	(Hungary) M Fucsovics	1	4	6^{7}
(Spain) N Almagro	6	6	7^{9}
(Israel) D Sela	3	2	6	7	3
18	(Uruguay) P Cuevas	6	6	0	5	6
32	(France) B Paire	6	2	3	7	6
(Serbia) D Lajović	2	6	6	5	1
(Cyprus) M Baghdatis	6	6	1
(Argentina) F Bagnis	4	2	1^{r}
(France) A Mannarino	4	6^{5}	3
Q	(United States) R Harrison	6	7^{7}	6
(Germany) D Brown	5	3	4
5	(Canada) M Raonic	7	6	6

Second round
10	(France) G Monfils	7	6	6
Q	(Czech Republic) J Šátral	5	4	3
(Spain) N Almagro	7^{7}	6	7^{11}
18	(Uruguay) P Cuevas	6^{5}	4	6^{9}
32	(France) B Paire	2	4	6	4
(Cyprus) M Baghdatis	6	6	3	6
Q	(United States) R Harrison	6^{4}	7	7	6
5	(Canada) M Raonic	7^{7}	5	5	1

Third round
10	(France) G Monfils	6	6	6
(Spain) N Almagro	4	2	4
(Cyprus) M Baghdatis	6	7^{7}	1	6
Q	(United States) R Harrison	3	6^{4}	6	1

Fourth round
10	(France) G Monfils	6	6	6
(Cyprus) M Baghdatis	3	2	3

=== Bottom half ===
==== Section 5 ====
First round
8	(Austria) D Thiem	6	2	5	6	6
(Australia) J Millman	3	6	7	4	3
(Lithuania) R Berankis	3	7^{7}	6	6
(Tunisia) M Jaziri	6	6^{3}	4	2
(Spain) P Carreño Busta	6	7	6
Q	(Belarus) I Ivashka	0	5	2
PR	(Serbia) J Tipsarević	7^{7}	6^{0}	6	6
29	(United States) S Querrey	6^{4}	7^{7}	3	3
19	(United States) S Johnson	4	1	7^{7}	6	6
(Russia) E Donskoy	6	6	6^{2}	3	3
WC	(Argentina) JM del Potro	6	6	7^{7}
(Argentina) D Schwartzman	4	4	6^{3}
(Russia) T Gabashvili	7^{11}	6	6^{5}	5	4
(Italy) F Fognini	6^{9}	3	7^{7}	7	6
(Ukraine) A Dolgopolov	5^{r}
11	(Spain) D Ferrer	6

Second round
8	(Austria) D Thiem	6	6	6
(Lithuania) R Berankis	4	3	2
(Spain) P Carreño Busta	3	4	6	6	6
PR	(Serbia) J Tipsarević	6	6	1	4	4
19	(United States) S Johnson	6^{5}	3	2
WC	(Argentina) JM del Potro	7^{7}	6	6
(Italy) F Fognini	0	6	7	1	4
11	(Spain) D Ferrer	6	4	5	6	6

Third round
8	(Austria) D Thiem	1	6	6	7
(Spain) P Carreño Busta	6	4	4	5
WC	(Argentina) JM del Potro	7^{7}	6	6
11	(Spain) D Ferrer	6^{3}	2	3

Fourth round
8	(Austria) D Thiem	3	2^{r}
WC	(Argentina) JM del Potro	6	3

==== Section 6 ====
First round
14	(Australia) N Kyrgios	6	6	6
(United Kingdom) A Bedene	4	4	4
(Argentina) H Zeballos	6	6	7^{9}
(Germany) F Mayer	3	4	6^{7}
(Croatia) I Dodig	3	4	7^{7}	5
(Ukraine) I Marchenko	6	6	6^{4}	7
(Bosnia and Herzegovina) D Džumhur	6	6	4	7^{7}
17	(Australia) B Tomic	4	3	6	6^{0}
27	(Germany) A Zverev	3	6	6	7^{7}
LL	(Germany) D Brands	6	1	4	6^{4}
(United Kingdom) D Evans	6	4	7	6
WC	(United States) R Ram	2	6	5	1
(United States) D Kudla	6	4	1	6	0
Q	(Italy) A Giannessi	0	6	6	1	6
(Spain) F Verdasco	6^{4}	4	4
3	(Switzerland) S Wawrinka	7^{7}	6	6

Second round
14	(Australia) N Kyrgios	7	6	6
(Argentina) H Zeballos	5	4	4
(Ukraine) I Marchenko	6	6	6
(Bosnia and Herzegovina) D Džumhur	2	4	3
27	(Germany) A Zverev	4	4	7	2
(United Kingdom) D Evans	6	6	5	6
Q	(Italy) A Giannessi	1	6^{4}	5
3	(Switzerland) S Wawrinka	6	7^{7}	7

Third round
14	(Australia) N Kyrgios	6	4	1	0^{r}
(Ukraine) I Marchenko	4	6	6	0
(United Kingdom) D Evans	6	3	7^{8}	6^{8}	2
3	(Switzerland) S Wawrinka	4	6	6^{6}	7^{10}	6

Fourth round
(Ukraine) I Marchenko	4	1	7^{7}	3
3	(Switzerland) S Wawrinka	6	6	6^{5}	6

==== Section 7 ====
First round
6	(Japan) K Nishikori	6	6	3	6
(Germany) B Becker	1	1	6	3
Q	(Russia) K Khachanov	6	6	4	6
Q	(Italy) T Fabbiano	3	3	6	3
Q	(United States) C Harrison	0	2	1
(France) P-H Mathieu	6	6	6
(France) N Mahut	6	7	1
25	(Germany) P Kohlschreiber	3	5	0^{r}
21	(Croatia) I Karlović	4	7^{7}	6^{4}	7^{7}	7
(Chinese Taipei) Y-h Lu	6	6^{4}	7^{7}	6^{5}	5
(United States) D Young	6	7	4	7
(Germany) J-L Struff	3	5	6	5
(Serbia) V Troicki	5	3	6	6	7^{7}
(Moldova) R Albot	7	6	4	4	6^{5}
Q	(United States) J Donaldson	4	7	6	6
12	(Belgium) D Goffin	6	5	4	0

Second round
6	(Japan) K Nishikori	6	4	6	6
Q	(Russia) K Khachanov	4	6	4	3
(France) P-H Mathieu	4	4	2
(France) N Mahut	6	6	6
21	(Croatia) I Karlović	6	7^{7}	6
(United States) D Young	4	6^{4}	4
(Serbia) V Troicki	5	3	3
Q	(United States) J Donaldson	7	6	6

Third round
6	(Japan) K Nishikori	4	6	6	6
(France) N Mahut	6	1	2	2
21	(Croatia) I Karlović	6	7^{7}	6
Q	(United States) J Donaldson	4	6^{3}	3

Fourth round
6	(Japan) K Nishikori	6	6	7^{7}
21	(Croatia) I Karlović	3	4	6^{4}

==== Section 8 ====
First round
16	(Spain) F López	3
(Croatia) B Ćorić	4^{r}
(Dominican Republic) V Estrella Burgos	0	1	1
(Portugal) J Sousa	6	6	6
WC	(United States) M Mmoh	4	4	1
(France) J Chardy	6	6	6
(Spain) Í Cervantes	2	4	6^{7}
22	(Bulgaria) G Dimitrov	6	6	7^{9}
30	(France) G Simon	6	6	6
Q	(Czech Republic) R Štěpánek	3	1	4
(Argentina) C Berlocq	4	2	1
(Italy) P Lorenzi	6	6	6
(Spain) M Granollers	7^{7}	7^{7}	6
(Argentina) J Mónaco	6^{5}	6^{2}	4
(Czech Republic) L Rosol	3	2	2
2	(United Kingdom) A Murray	6	6	6

Second round
16	(Spain) F López	2	4	6	5
(Portugal) J Sousa	6	6	1	7
(France) J Chardy	6	4	6	4	2
22	(Bulgaria) G Dimitrov	4	6	3	6	6
30	(France) G Simon	6	2	2	7^{7}	6^{3}
(Italy) P Lorenzi	3	6	6	6^{1}	7^{7}
(Spain) M Granollers	4	1	4
2	(United Kingdom) A Murray	6	6	6

Third round
(Portugal) J Sousa	4	1	6	2
22	(Bulgaria) G Dimitrov	6	6	3	6
(Italy) P Lorenzi	6^{4}	7	2	3
2	(United Kingdom) A Murray	7^{7}	5	6	6

Fourth round
22	(Bulgaria) G Dimitrov	1	2	2
2	(United Kingdom) A Murray	6	6	6

== Seeded players ==
Seeds are based on the ATP and WTA rankings as of August 22, 2016. Rank and points before are as of August 29, 2016.

Seed	Rank	Player	Points before	Points defending	Points won	Points after	Status
1	1	(Serbia) Novak Djokovic	14,840	2,000	1,200	14,040	Runner-up, lost to (Switzerland) Stan Wawrinka [3]
2	2	(United Kingdom) Andy Murray	9,305	180	360	9,485	Quarterfinals lost to (Japan) Kei Nishikori [6]
3	3	(Switzerland) Stan Wawrinka	4,980	720	2,000	6,260	Champion, defeated (Serbia) Novak Djokovic [1]
4	5	(Spain) Rafael Nadal	4,850	90	180	4,940	Fourth round lost to (France) Lucas Pouille [24]
5	6	(Canada) Milos Raonic	4,805	90	45	4,760	Second round lost to (United States) Ryan Harrison [Q]
6	7	(Japan) Kei Nishikori	4,165	10	720	4,875	Semifinals lost to (Switzerland) Stan Wawrinka [3]
7	9	(Croatia) Marin Čilić	3,515	720	90	2,885	Third round lost to (United States) Jack Sock [26]
8	10	(Austria) Dominic Thiem	3,205	90	180	3,295	Fourth round retired vs. (Argentina) Juan Martín del Potro [WC]
9	11	(France) Jo-Wilfried Tsonga	2,875	360	360	2,875	Quarterfinals retired vs. (Serbia) Novak Djokovic [1]
10	12	(France) Gaël Monfils	2,835	10	720	3,545	Semifinals lost to (Serbia) Novak Djokovic [1]
11	13	(Spain) David Ferrer	2,660	90	90	2,660	Third round lost to (Argentina) Juan Martín del Potro [WC]
12	14	(Belgium) David Goffin	2,565	90	10	2,485	First round lost to (United States) Jared Donaldson [Q]
13	15	(France) Richard Gasquet	2,230	360	10	1,880	First round lost to (United Kingdom) Kyle Edmund
14	16	(Australia) Nick Kyrgios	2,060	10	90	2,140	Third round retired vs. (Ukraine) Illya Marchenko
15	17	(Spain) Roberto Bautista Agut	2,040	180	90	1,950	Third round lost to (France) Lucas Pouille [24]
16	18	(Spain) Feliciano López	1,840	360	45	1,525	Second round lost to (Portugal) João Sousa
17	19	(Australia) Bernard Tomic	1,780	90	10	1,700	First round lost to (Bosnia and Herzegovina) Damir Džumhur
18	20	(Uruguay) Pablo Cuevas	1,745	45	45	1,745	Second round lost to (Spain) Nicolás Almagro
19	22	(United States) Steve Johnson	1,635	10	45	1,670	Second round lost to (Argentina) Juan Martín del Potro [WC]
20	21	(United States) John Isner	1,645	180	90	1,555	Third round lost to (United Kingdom) Kyle Edmund
21	23	(Croatia) Ivo Karlović	1,570	45	180	1,705	Fourth round lost to (Japan) Kei Nishikori [6]
22	24	(Bulgaria) Grigor Dimitrov	1,555	45	180	1,690	Fourth round lost to (United Kingdom) Andy Murray [2]
23	35	(South Africa) Kevin Anderson	1,275	360	90	1,005	Third round lost to (France) Jo-Wilfried Tsonga [9]
24	25	(France) Lucas Pouille	1,481	10	360	1,831	Quarterfinals lost to (France) Gaël Monfils [10]
25	26	(Germany) Philipp Kohlschreiber	1,475	90	10	1,395	First round retired vs. (France) Nicolas Mahut
26	27	(United States) Jack Sock	1,450	45	180	1,585	Fourth round lost to (France) Jo-Wilfried Tsonga [9]
27	28	(Germany) Alexander Zverev	1,415	35	45	1,425	Second round lost to (United Kingdom) Daniel Evans
28	29	(Slovakia) Martin Kližan	1,405	45	10	1,370	First round lost to (Russia) Mikhail Youzhny
29	30	(United States) Sam Querrey	1,400	10	10	1,400	First round lost to (Serbia) Janko Tipsarević [PR]
30	31	(France) Gilles Simon	1,385	10	45	1,420	Second round lost to (Italy) Paolo Lorenzi
31	33	(Spain) Albert Ramos Viñolas	1,330	10+45	45+20	1,340	Second round lost to (Russia) Andrey Kuznetsov
32	34	(France) Benoît Paire	1,305	180	45	1,170	Second round lost to (Cyprus) Marcos Baghdatis

=== Withdrawn players ===
The following players would have been seeded, but they withdrew from the event.

Rank	Player	Points before	Points defending	Points after	Withdrawal reason
4	(Switzerland) Roger Federer	4,945	1,200	3,745	Knee injury
8	(Czech Republic) Tomáš Berdych	3,570	180	3,390	Appendicitis

== Other entry information ==
=== Wild cards ===
- (Argentina) Juan Martín del Potro
- (Australia) James Duckworth
- (United States) Ernesto Escobedo (Note: Winner of the Men's USTA Wild Card Challenge held in Binghamton, New York, Lexington, Kentucky and Aptos, California)
- (United States) Bjorn Fratangelo
- (United States) Mackenzie McDonald (Note: Winner of the men's singles tournament in the 2016 NCAA Division I Tennis Championships)
- (United States) Michael Mmoh (Note: Winner of the Kalamazoo Wild Card tournament)
- (United States) Rajeev Ram
- (United States) Frances Tiafoe

=== Protected ranking ===
- (France) Julien Benneteau (39)
- (Serbia) Janko Tipsarević (39)
- (United States) Brian Baker (56)
- ~~(Russia) Dmitry Tursunov (89)~~
- (Poland) Jerzy Janowicz (94)

=== Qualifiers ===
- (Argentina) Guido Andreozzi
- (Switzerland) Marco Chiudinelli
- (Brazil) Guilherme Clezar
- (Belgium) Steve Darcis
- (United States) Jared Donaldson
- (Italy) Thomas Fabbiano
- (Hungary) Márton Fucsovics
- (Italy) Alessandro Giannessi
- (United States) Christian Harrison
- (United States) Ryan Harrison
- (Belarus) Ilya Ivashka
- (Russia) Karen Khachanov
- (India) Saketh Myneni
- (Czech Republic) Jan Šátral
- (Czech Republic) Radek Štěpánek
- (Germany) Mischa Zverev

=== Lucky losers ===
- (Germany) Daniel Brands
- (Slovakia) Jozef Kovalík

=== Withdrawals ===
Before the tournament

- ‡ (Switzerland) Roger Federer (3) → replaced by (Germany) Dustin Brown (99)
- ‡ (Spain) Tommy Robredo (92) → replaced by (Russia) Teymuraz Gabashvili (100)
- ‡ (Latvia) Ernests Gulbis (64) → replaced by (United States) Denis Kudla (101)
- ‡ (Czech Republic) Tomáš Berdych (8) → replaced by (Slovakia) Lukáš Lacko (102) (Note: Last direct acceptance)
- @ (Australia) Thanasi Kokkinakis (81 PR) → replaced by (Slovakia) Jozef Kovalík (LL)
- § (Russia) Dmitry Tursunov (89 PR) → replaced by (Germany) Daniel Brands (LL)

‡ – withdrew from entry list before qualifying began
@ – withdrew from entry list after qualifying began
§ – withdrew from main draw

During the tournament

- (Czech Republic) Jiří Veselý (left forearm inflammation)

Retirements

- (Argentina) Facundo Bagnis
- (Croatia) Borna Ćorić
- (Ukraine) Alexandr Dolgopolov
- (Germany) Philipp Kohlschreiber
- (Australia) Nick Kyrgios
- (Slovakia) Lukáš Lacko
- (Austria) Dominic Thiem
- (France) Jo-Wilfried Tsonga
- (Russia) Mikhail Youzhny

== Notes ==
Preceded by 2016 Wimbledon Championships – Men's singles	Grand Slam men's singles	Succeeded by 2017 Australian Open – Men's singles
