= Søren Hess-Olesen =

Danish tennis player

- Country (sports): Denmark
- Residence: Aarhus, Denmark
- Born: January 9, 1991 (age 35) Aarhus, Denmark
- Height: 188 cm (6 ft 2 in)
- Plays: Right-handed
- Prize money: US$ 5,415

Singles
- Career record: 2–3
- Career titles: 0
- Highest ranking: No. 937 (December 18, 2017)

Doubles
- Career record: 1–0
- Career titles: 0
- Highest ranking: No. 1519 (July 11, 2016)
- Last updated on: June 6, 2022.

Søren Hess-Olesen (born 9 January 1991) is a Danish tennis player.

Hess-Olesen has a career high ATP singles ranking of 937 achieved on 18 December 2017.

Hess-Olesen represents Denmark at the Davis Cup, where he has a W/L record of 3–3.

== Career finals ==
=== Singles ===
Legend
ATP Challenger Tour (0–0)
ITF Futures (0–1)

| Result | No. | Date | Category | Tournament | Surface | Opponent | Score |
|---|---|---|---|---|---|---|---|
| Loss | 1. | July 19, 2015 | Futures | Portugal F9, Castelo Branco | Clay | (Spain) Georgi Rumenov Payakov | 3–6, 6–3, 3–6 |

== See also ==
- List of Denmark Davis Cup team representatives

Sporting positions
| Preceded by (Romania) Costin Pavăl | Big 12 Tennis Player of the Year; 2014 | Succeeded by (Spain) Axel Álvarez Llamas |
