= Maya Jansen =

American tennis player

- Country (sports): United States
- Residence: Valleyford, Washington
- Born: May 27, 1994 (age 31)
- Height: 1.75 m (5 ft 9 in)
- Plays: Right-handed
- Prize money: $7,539

Singles
- Career record: 2-3

Doubles
- Career record: 4-3
- Highest ranking: No. 889 (29 August 2016)

Grand Slam doubles results
- US Open: 1R (2015)

Maya Jansen (27 May 1994) is an American tennis player. Together with Canadian player, Erin Routliffe, she won the 2014 and 2015 NCAA women's doubles championship as members of the tennis team of the University of Alabama. She also won the 2015 US Open National playoffs women's doubles championship, earning her a wild card entry to the US Open women's doubles tournament.

== ITF finals (0–1) ==
=== Doubles (0–1) ===
Legend
$100,000 tournaments
$75,000/$80,000 tournaments
$50,000/$60,000 tournaments
$25,000 tournaments
$10,000/$15,000 tournaments

Outcome	No.	Date	Tournament	Surface	Partner	Opponents	Score
Runner-up	1.	10 December 2017	Solapur, India	Hard	(New Zealand) Erin Routliffe	(Chinese Taipei) Hsu Ching-wen (India) Pranjala Yadlapalli	5–7, 6–1, [6–10]
