= Austin Smith (tennis) =

American tennis player

- Country (sports): United States
- Residence: Cumming, Georgia, United States
- Born: 25 November 1993 (age 31)
- Height: 1.85 m (6 ft 1 in)
- College: University of Georgia
- Prize money: $14,590

Singles
- Career record: 0–1 (at ATP Tour level, Grand Slam level, and in Davis Cup)
- Career titles: 0; 0 Challenger. 1 Futures
- Highest ranking: No. 771 (26 June 2017)

Doubles
- Career record: 0–0 (at ATP Tour level, Grand Slam level, and in Davis Cup)
- Career titles: 0; 0 Challenger. 0 Futures
- Highest ranking: No. 705 (3 April 2017)
- Last updated on: 9 May 2021.

Austin Smith (born 25 November 1993) is an American tennis player.

Smith has a career high ATP singles ranking of World No. 771 achieved on 26 June 2017. He also has a career high ATP doubles ranking of World No. 705 achieved on 3 April 2017.

Smith made his ATP debut at the 2016 BB&T Atlanta Open when he was granted a wild card entry into the singles main draw. He was defeated by compatriot Taylor Fritz in straight sets 2–6, 2–6.

Smith has reached one career singles final, winning the title at the Israel F13 ITF Futures tournament in September 2016 against Daniel Cukierman 6–1, 6–2. Additionally, he has reach three career doubles finals but has yet to win a doubles title at any level.

Smith played college tennis at the University of Georgia.

== ATP Challenger and ITF Futures finals ==
=== Singles: 1 (1–0) ===
Legend ATP Challenger (0–0) ITF Futures (1–0)	Finals by surface Hard (1–0) Clay (0–0) Grass (0–0) Carpet (0–0)

Result	W–L	Date	Tournament	Tier	Surface	Opponent	Score
Win	1–0	Sep 2016	Israel F13, Kiryat Gat	Futures	Hard	(Israel) Daniel Cukierman	6–1, 6–2

=== Doubles: 3 (0–3) ===
Legend ATP Challenger (0–0) ITF Futures (0–3)	Finals by surface Hard (0–2) Clay (0–1) Grass (0–0) Carpet (0–0)

Result	W–L	Date	Tournament	Tier	Surface	Partner	Opponents	Score
Loss	0–1	Jun 2016	USA F18, Winston-Salem	Futures	Hard	(United States) Dennis Uspensky	(United States) Jared Hiltzik (United States) Thai-Son Kwiatkowski	4–6, 2–6
Loss	0–2	Oct 2016	Israel F14, Meitar	Futures	Hard	(United States) Brandon Anandan	(United Kingdom) Scott Clayton (Israel) Dekel Bar	6–3, 3–6, [8–10]
Loss	0–3	Nov 2016	USA F35, Birmingham	Futures	Clay	(United States) Alex Lawson	(United States) Hunter Johnson (United States) Yates Johnson	2–6, 4–6
