= Oklahoma State Cowboys tennis =

American college tennis team

- University: Oklahoma State University
- Head coach: Dustin Taylor (4th season)
- Conference: Big 12
- Location: Stillwater, Oklahoma, US
- Home Court: Greenwood Tennis Center
- Nickname: Cowboys
- Colors: Orange and black

NCAA Tournament Round of 16
- 1978, 1981, 1985, 1986, 1989, 1990, 2003, 2007, 2008, 2016

NCAA Tournament Round of 32
- 1978, 1981, 1985, 1986, 1989, 1990, 1997, 1998, 2001, 2003, 2005, 2006, 2007, 2008, 2014, 2015, 2016, 2017, 2019, 2021, 2023, 2024

NCAA Tournament appearances
- 1978, 1981, 1985, 1986, 1989, 1990, 1991, 1997, 1998, 2001, 2003, 2004, 2005, 2006, 2007, 2008, 2009, 2014, 2015, 2016, 2017, 2018, 2019, 2021, 2023, 2024

Conference Tournament championships
- Big Eight; 1958, 1959, 1960, 1961, 1962, 1963, 1977, 1978, 1979, 1980, 1981, 1983, 1984, 1985, 1986, 1989, 1990, 1991

Conference regular season champions
- Missouri Valley; 1948, 1949, 1953 Big Eight; 1959, 1960, 1989

The Oklahoma State Cowboys tennis team represents the Oklahoma State University in NCAA Division I college tennis as a member of the Big 12 Conference and plays its home matches at the Greenwood Tennis Center. The Cowboys are currently led by 4th year head coach, Dustin Taylor.

The Cowboys have made 26 appearances in the NCAA Championship, reaching the Round of Sixteen 10 times. Oklahoma State has also won 24 conference titles, with 21 of them coming during their time in the Big Eight Conference.

== History ==
Oklahoma State's first season came in 1947, when the team played in the Missouri Valley Conference. The team would win their first conference title a year later in 1948, and would win two more in 1949 and 1953 before leaving for the Big Eight Conference. The Cowboys would continue to have success in the new conference, dominating the early 1960's before Oklahoma State would finally make their first NCAA Championship in 1978.

From 1977–91, the Cowboys would win 12 Big Eight tournament titles in 15 years, going to seven NCAA Championships during that time and cementing themselves as one of the most consistent teams in the country. Despite not winning a conference title since 1991, Oklahoma State has continued to appear in the NCAA Championship, most recently making the 2nd round of the 2024 NCAA Championship.

== Honors ==
=== All-Americans ===
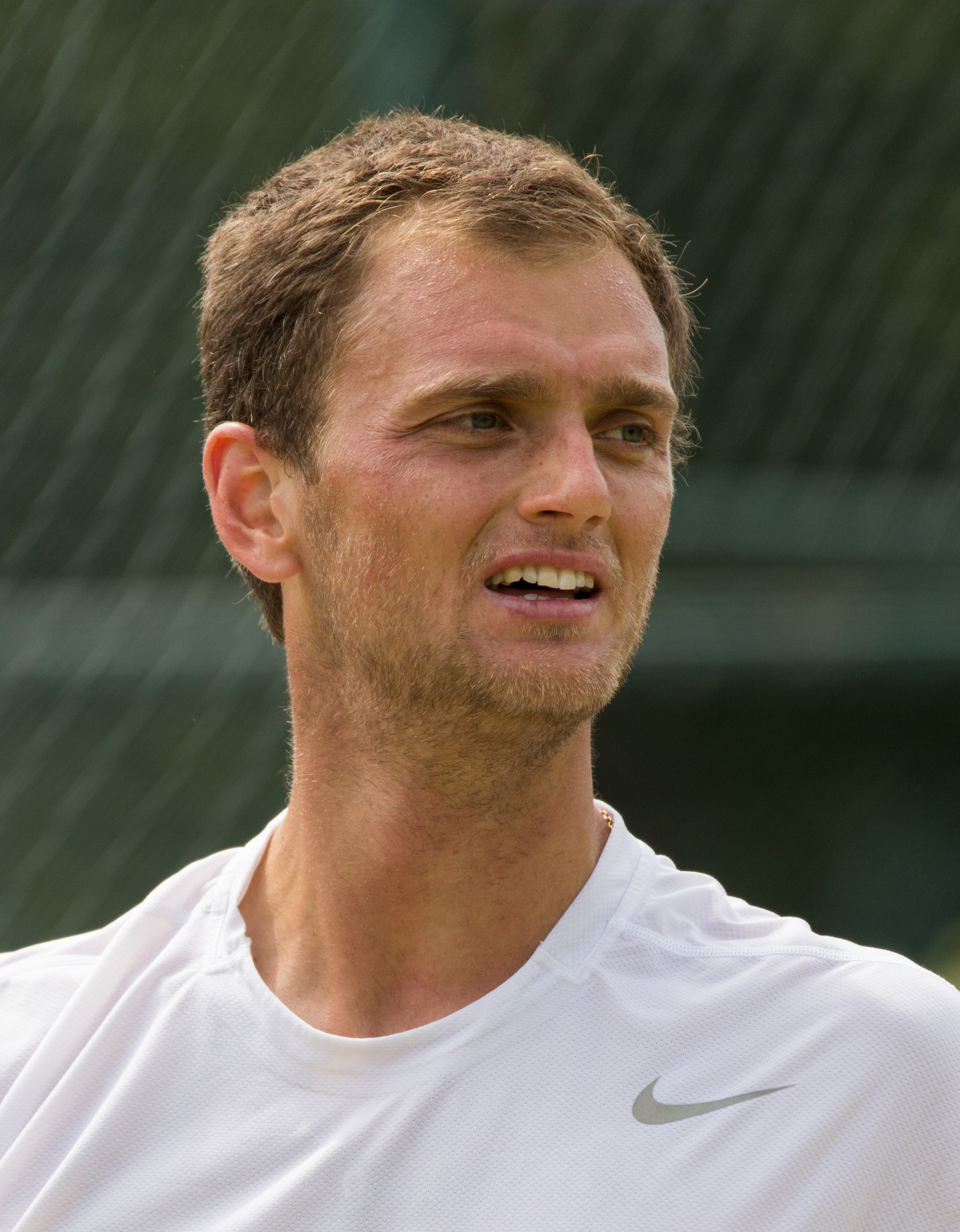
3x All–American Aleksandr Nedovyesov

Oklahoma State has produced 22 All–Americans, including Aleksandr Nedovyesov, the program's first three–time singles All–American and Arjun Kadhe, the program's first four–time doubles All–American. Most recently, Dominik Kellovský and Matěj Vocel earned doubles All–American honors in 2020.

=== Big 12 Player of the Year ===
- Pavel Kudrnac (1997, 1998)
- Aleksandr Nedovyesov (2008, 2009)

=== Big 12 Coach of the Year ===
- James Wadley (2007)

== Greenwood Tennis Center ==
Located just north of Boone Pickens Stadium, the 50,000 square foot tennis center an indoor facility that houses six tennis courts, along with coaches’ offices, locker rooms, and a sports medicine hub complete with a hydrotherapy center. The outdoor capacity seats around 1,000 spectators, while the indoor facilities are able to seat at least 350. Being one of the top tennis facilities in the country, the Greenwood Tennis Center has hosted the 2016 and 2024 Big 12 Championships, 2021 ITA Indoor National Championships, and 2024 NCAA Championships.
