= Frances Altick =

American tennis player

- Country (sports): United States
- Born: February 22, 1994 (age 31) Shreveport, Louisiana, U.S.
- Height: 5 ft 2 in (1.57 m)
- Prize money: $8,634

Singles
- Career record: 51–27
- Career titles: 0
- Highest ranking: No. 840 (July 18, 2016)

Doubles
- Career record: 17–11
- Career titles: 2 ITF
- Highest ranking: No. 677 (July 3, 2017)

Frances Altick (born February 22, 1994) is an American former tennis player.

In her career, she won two doubles titles on the ITF Women's Circuit. On July 18, 2016, she reached her best singles ranking of world No. 840. On July 3, 2017, she peaked at No. 677 in the doubles rankings.

In 2016, Altick was handed a wildcard for the main draw at the Charleston Open where she made her debut on the WTA Tour. She lost in straight sets to Alison Riske. Her last match on the circuit was in August 2017.

In 2016, Altick graduated from Vanderbilt University with a BS in psychology. She had spent four years playing tennis for the Commodores, helping them to an NCAA championship in 2015.

== ITF Circuit finals ==
=== Singles (0–1) ===
Legend $25,000 tournaments $10,000 tournaments	Finals by surface Hard (0–1) Clay (0–0)

Result	Date	Tier	Tournament	Surface	Opponent	Score
Runner-up	August 3, 2015	10,000	ITF Fort Worth, United States	Hard	(Norway) Ulrikke Eikeri	3–6, 1–6

=== Doubles (2–1) ===
Legend $15,000 tournaments $10,000 tournaments	Finals by surface Hard (0–1) Clay (2–0)

Result	Date	Tier	Tournament	Surface	Partner	Opponents	Score
Winner	July 4, 2016	10,000	ITF Amstelveen, Netherlands	Clay	(Australia) Astra Sharma	(Netherlands) Erika Vogelsang (Netherlands) Mandy Wagemaker	6–4, 6–2
Winner	July 11, 2016	10,000	ITF Knokke, Belgium	Clay	(Australia) Astra Sharma	(Belgium) Déborah Kerfs (Netherlands) Kelly Versteeg	6–4, 6–4
Runner-up	June 23, 2017	15,000	ITF Victoria, Canada	Hard (i)	(United States) Alexa Graham	(Mexico) Andrea Renée Villarreal (Mexico) Marcela Zacarías	5–7, 4–6
