= 2016 US Open (tennis) =

- Date: August 29 – September 11
- Edition: 136th
- Category: Grand Slam (ITF)
- Draw: 128S/64D/32X
- Prize money: $46,300,000
- Surface: Hard
- Location: New York City, New York, United States
- Venue: USTA Billie Jean King National Tennis Center

Champions

Men's singles
- (Switzerland) Stan Wawrinka

Women's singles
- (Germany) Angelique Kerber

Men's doubles
- (Brazil) Bruno Soares / (United Kingdom) Jamie Murray

Women's doubles
- (United States) Bethanie Mattek-Sands / (Czech Republic) Lucie Šafářová

Mixed doubles
- (Germany) Laura Siegemund / (Croatia) Mate Pavić

Boys' singles
- (Canada) Félix Auger-Aliassime

Girls' singles
- (United States) Kayla Day

Boys' doubles
- (Bolivia) Juan Carlos Aguilar / (Brazil) Felipe Meligeni Alves

Girls' doubles
- (United States) Jada Hart / (United States) Ena Shibahara

Men's champions invitational
- (Australia) Pat Cash / (Australia) Mark Philippoussis

Women's champions invitational
- (United States) Lindsay Davenport / (United States) Mary Joe Fernández
- US Open

The 2016 US Open was the 136th edition of tennis' US Open, the fourth and final Grand Slam event of the year. It took place on outdoor hard courts at the USTA Billie Jean King National Tennis Center in New York City.

In the men's singles competition, Stan Wawrinka defeated defending champion Novak Djokovic in the final.

Angelique Kerber defeated Karolína Plíšková in the women's singles to become the first German player to win the tournament since Steffi Graf in 1996. 2015 women's singles champion Flavia Pennetta did not defend her title as she had retired at the end of the 2015 season.

This tournament turned out to be the last one in the career of former No.1 player in the world and 2008 French Open women's singles champion Ana Ivanovic, who announced her retirement from professional tennis at the end of the year.

== Tournament ==
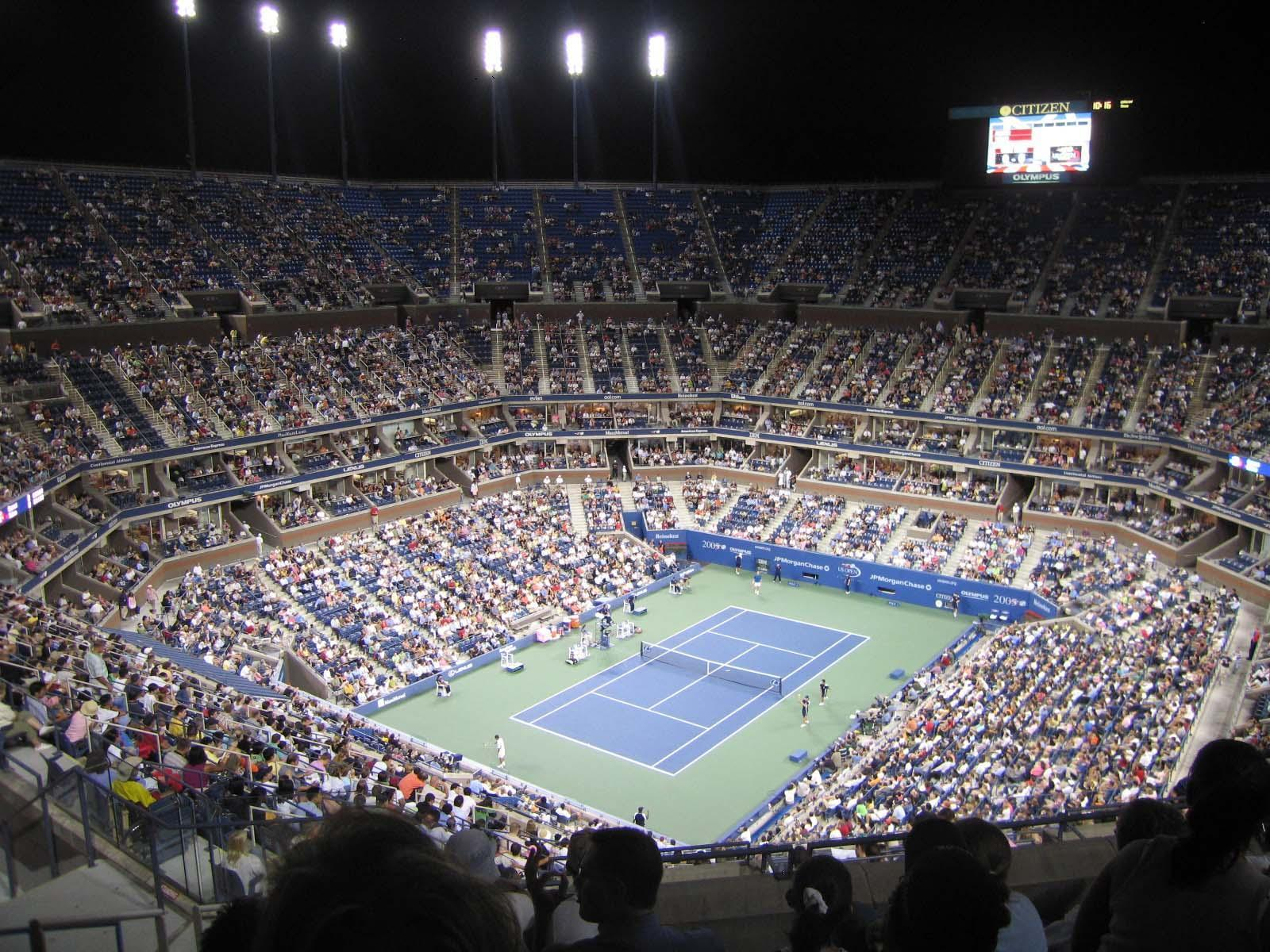
Arthur Ashe Stadium before the retractable roof was installed and where the finals of the US Open took place

The 2016 US Open was the 136th edition of the tournament and it was held at the USTA Billie Jean King National Tennis Center in Flushing Meadows–Corona Park of Queens in New York City, New York, United States.

The tournament was an event run by the International Tennis Federation (ITF) and was part of the 2016 ATP World Tour and the 2016 WTA Tour calendars under the Grand Slam category. The tournament consists of both men's and women's singles and doubles draws as well as a mixed doubles event. There are also singles and doubles events for both boys and girls (players under 18), which is part of the Grade A category of tournaments.

In addition, the annual men's and women's Champions Invitational doubles events were held, with eight male and eight female former Grand Slam champions taking part. For the third year running, the American Collegiate Invitational competitions were organized, where top sixteen American collegiate players compete in men's and women's singles events. Exhibition matches also took place.

Due to the 2016 Summer Paralympics, no usual singles, doubles and quad events for men's and women's wheelchair tennis players as part of the UNIQLO tour under the Grand Slam category were played.

The tournament was played on hard courts and took place on a series of 17 courts with DecoTurf surface, including the three main showcourts – Arthur Ashe Stadium, Louis Armstrong Stadium, and the new Grandstand. It was the first US Open played on courts with operational roofs: on centre court and on the newly built Grandstand stadium. The Ashe roof was expected to be used only for rain, unlike the Australian Open, which also closes its roof in cases of extreme heat. It was also the last tournament before the demolition of Louis Armstrong Stadium and the old Grandstand. Arthur Ashe Stadium and the new Grandstand would be the existing main stadiums for the 2017 edition.

For the second year running, the US Open was scheduled across 14 days, rather than the 15-day schedule of 2013 and 2014, which impacted all senior events. Women's singles semifinals have been scheduled for September 8 evening session, while men's singles semifinal matches was played on Friday September 9. The men's doubles final was played before the women's singles final on Saturday, September 10, and the men's singles final followed the women's doubles final on Sunday, September 11.

== Broadcast ==
In the United States, the 2016 US Open was the second under a new, 11-year, $825 million contract with ESPN, in which the broadcaster holds exclusive rights to the entire tournament and the US Open Series. This means that the tournament was not available on broadcast television. This also makes ESPN the exclusive U.S. broadcaster for three of the four tennis majors.

Live action from a total of twelve courts was available this year (Arthur Ashe Stadium, Louis Armstrong Stadium, Grandstand, Court 4, Court 5, Court 6, Court 9, Court 11, Court 12, Court 13, Court 17 and Court P6/Old Grandstand), an increase from eleven in 2015.

== Point and prize money distribution ==
=== Point distribution ===
Below is a series of tables for each of the competitions showing the ranking points on offer for each event.

==== Senior ====
Event	W	F	SF	QF	Round of 16	Round of 32	Round of 64	Round of 128	Q	Q3	Q2	Q1
Men's singles	2000	1200	720	360	180	90	45	10	25	16	8	0
Men's doubles	2000	1200	720	360	180	90	0	—N/a	—N/a	—N/a	—N/a	—N/a
Women's singles	2000	1300	780	430	240	130	70	10	40	30	20	2
Women's doubles	2000	1300	780	430	240	130	10	—N/a	—N/a	—N/a	—N/a	—N/a

==== Junior ====
Event	W	F	SF	QF	Round of 16	Round of 32	Q	Q3
Boys' singles	375	270	180	120	75	30	25	20
Girls' singles	375	270	180	120	75	30	25	20
Boys' doubles	270	180	120	75	45	—N/a	—N/a	—N/a
Girls' doubles	270	180	120	75	45	—N/a	—N/a	—N/a

=== Prize money ===
The total prize-money compensation for the 2016 US Open is $46.3 million, a 10% increase on the same total last year. Of that total, a record $3.5 million goes to both the men's and women's singles champions. This made the US Open the most lucrative and highest paying tennis grand slam in the world, leapfrogging Wimbledon in total prize money fund. Prize money for the US Open qualifying tournament is also up 10 percent, to $1.9 million.

Event	W	F	SF	QF	Round of 16	Round of 32	Round of 64	Round of 128	Q3	Q2	Q1
Singles	$3,500,000	$1,750,000	$875,000	$450,000	$235,000	$140,000	$77,188	$43,313	$16,350	$10,900	$5,606
Doubles (Note: Prize money listed per team)	$625,000	$310,000	$150,000	$75,000	$40,000	$24,500	$15,141	—N/a	—N/a	—N/a	—N/a
Mixed doubles	$150,000	$70,000	$30,000	$15,000	$10,000	$5,000	—N/a	—N/a	—N/a	—N/a	—N/a

On top of listed above, $600,000 will contribute Champions Invitational events prize money, while $1,478,000 is estimated as players' per diem. A total of men's and women's singles prize money ($36,324,000) will account for more than 78% of total player compensation, while doubles ($5,463,000) and mixed doubles ($500,000) – for 12% and 1%, respectively.

==== Bonus prize money ====
The top three men's and top three women's finishers in the 2016 US Open Series also earn bonus prize money at the US Open, with the champions of the Series Bonus Challenge having the opportunity to win $1 million in addition to their tournament prize money.

2016 Emirates Airline US Open Series Finish	2016 US Open Finish								Awardees	
2016 Emirates Airline US Open Series Finish	W	F	SF	QF	Round of 16	Round of 32	Round of 64	Round of 128	Awardees	
1st place	$1,000,000	$500,000	$250,000	$125,000	$70,000	$40,000	$25,000	$15,000	(Japan) Kei Nishikori	$250,000
1st place	$1,000,000	$500,000	$250,000	$125,000	$70,000	$40,000	$25,000	$15,000	(Poland) Agnieszka Radwańska	$70,000
2nd place	$500,000	$250,000	$125,000	$62,500	$35,000	$20,000	$12,500	$7,500	(Bulgaria) Grigor Dimitrov	$35,000
2nd place	$500,000	$250,000	$125,000	$62,500	$35,000	$20,000	$12,500	$7,500	(United Kingdom) Johanna Konta	$35,000
3rd place	$250,000	$125,000	$62,500	$31,250	$17,500	$10,000	$6,250	$3,750	(Canada) Milos Raonic	$6,250
3rd place	$250,000	$125,000	$62,500	$31,250	$17,500	$10,000	$6,250	$3,750	(Romania) Simona Halep	$31,250

== Singles players ==
2016 US Open – Men's singles

Champion		Runner-up	
(Switzerland) Stan Wawrinka [3]		(Serbia) Novak Djokovic [1]	
Semifinals out
(France) Gaël Monfils [10]		(Japan) Kei Nishikori [6]	
Quarterfinals out
(France) Jo-Wilfried Tsonga [9]	(France) Lucas Pouille [24]	(Argentina) Juan Martín del Potro (WC)	(United Kingdom) Andy Murray [2]
4th round out
(United Kingdom) Kyle Edmund	(United States) Jack Sock [26]	(Spain) Rafael Nadal [4]	(Cyprus) Marcos Baghdatis
(Austria) Dominic Thiem [8]	(Ukraine) Illya Marchenko	(Croatia) Ivo Karlović [21]	(Bulgaria) Grigor Dimitrov [22]
3rd round out
(Russia) Mikhail Youzhny	(United States) John Isner [20]	(South Africa) Kevin Anderson [23]	(Croatia) Marin Čilić [7]
(Russia) Andrey Kuznetsov	(Spain) Roberto Bautista Agut [15]	(Spain) Nicolás Almagro	(United States) Ryan Harrison (Q)
(Spain) Pablo Carreño Busta	(Spain) David Ferrer [11]	(Australia) Nick Kyrgios [14]	(United Kingdom) Dan Evans
(France) Nicolas Mahut	(United States) Jared Donaldson (Q)	(Portugal) João Sousa	(Italy) Paolo Lorenzi
2nd round out
(Czech Republic) Jiří Veselý	(Argentina) Guido Pella	(Belgium) Steve Darcis (Q)	(United States) Ernesto Escobedo (WC)
(Australia) James Duckworth (WC)	(Canada) Vasek Pospisil	(Germany) Mischa Zverev (Q)	(Ukraine) Sergiy Stakhovsky
(Italy) Andreas Seppi	(Spain) Albert Ramos-Viñolas [31]	(Switzerland) Marco Chiudinelli (Q)	(Argentina) Federico Delbonis
(Czech Republic) Jan Šátral (Q)	(Uruguay) Pablo Cuevas [18]	(France) Benoît Paire [32]	(Canada) Milos Raonic [5]
(Lithuania) Ričardas Berankis	(Serbia) Janko Tipsarević (PR)	(United States) Steve Johnson [19]	(Italy) Fabio Fognini
(Argentina) Horacio Zeballos	(Bosnia and Herzegovina) Damir Džumhur	(Germany) Alexander Zverev [27]	(Italy) Alessandro Giannessi (Q)
(Russia) Karen Khachanov (Q)	(France) Paul-Henri Mathieu	(United States) Donald Young	(Serbia) Viktor Troicki
(Spain) Feliciano López [16]	(France) Jérémy Chardy	(France) Gilles Simon [30]	(Spain) Marcel Granollers
1st round out
(Poland) Jerzy Janowicz (PR)	(India) Saketh Myneni (Q)	(United States) Bjorn Fratangelo (WC)	(Slovakia) Martin Kližan [28]
(United States) Frances Tiafoe (WC)	(Australia) Jordan Thompson	(Slovakia) Lukáš Lacko	(France) Richard Gasquet [13]
(Argentina) Guido Andreozzi (Q)	(Netherlands) Robin Haase	(Slovakia) Jozef Kovalík (LL)	(Japan) Yoshihito Nishioka
(United States) Taylor Fritz	(France) Pierre-Hugues Herbert	(Portugal) Gastão Elias	(Brazil) Rogério Dutra Silva
(Uzbekistan) Denis Istomin	(France) Stéphane Robert	(Brazil) Thomaz Bellucci	(France) Julien Benneteau (PR)
(Kazakhstan) Mikhail Kukushkin	(Brazil) Guilherme Clezar (Q)	(United States) Brian Baker (PR)	(Spain) Guillermo García-López
(Luxembourg) Gilles Müller	(United States) Mackenzie McDonald (WC)	(Hungary) Márton Fucsovics (Q)	(Israel) Dudi Sela
(Serbia) Dušan Lajović	(Argentina) Facundo Bagnis	(France) Adrian Mannarino	(Germany) Dustin Brown
(Australia) John Millman	(Tunisia) Malek Jaziri	(Belarus) Ilya Ivashka (Q)	(United States) Sam Querrey [29]
(Russia) Evgeny Donskoy	(Argentina) Diego Schwartzman	(Russia) Teymuraz Gabashvili	(Ukraine) Alexandr Dolgopolov
(United Kingdom) Aljaž Bedene	(Germany) Florian Mayer	(Croatia) Ivan Dodig	(Australia) Bernard Tomic [17]
(Germany) Daniel Brands (LL)	(United States) Rajeev Ram (WC)	(United States) Denis Kudla	(Spain) Fernando Verdasco
(Germany) Benjamin Becker	(Italy) Thomas Fabbiano (Q)	(United States) Christian Harrison (Q)	(Germany) Philipp Kohlschreiber [25]
(Chinese Taipei) Lu Yen-hsun	(Germany) Jan-Lennard Struff	(Moldova) Radu Albot	(Belgium) David Goffin [12]
(Croatia) Borna Ćorić	(Dominican Republic) Víctor Estrella Burgos	(United States) Michael Mmoh (Q)	(Spain) Íñigo Cervantes
(Czech Republic) Radek Štěpánek (Q)	(Argentina) Carlos Berlocq	(Argentina) Juan Mónaco	(Czech Republic) Lukáš Rosol

2016 US Open – Women's singles

Champion		Runner-up	
(Germany) Angelique Kerber [2]		(Czech Republic) Karolína Plíšková [10]	
Semifinals out
(United States) Serena Williams [1]		(Denmark) Caroline Wozniacki	
Quarterfinals out
(Romania) Simona Halep [5]	(Croatia) Ana Konjuh	(Latvia) Anastasija Sevastova	(Italy) Roberta Vinci [7]
4th round out
(Kazakhstan) Yaroslava Shvedova	(Spain) Carla Suárez Navarro [11]	(Poland) Agnieszka Radwańska [4]	(United States) Venus Williams [6]
(United States) Madison Keys [8]	(United Kingdom) Johanna Konta [13]	(Ukraine) Lesia Tsurenko	(Czech Republic) Petra Kvitová [14]
3rd round out
(Sweden) Johanna Larsson	(China) Zhang Shuai	(Russia) Elena Vesnina [19]	(Hungary) Tímea Babos [31]
(France) Caroline Garcia [25]	(United States) Varvara Lepchenko	(Russia) Anastasia Pavlyuchenkova [17]	(Germany) Laura Siegemund [26]
(Japan) Naomi Osaka	(Romania) Monica Niculescu	(Switzerland) Belinda Bencic [24]	(Ukraine) Kateryna Bondarenko
(Germany) Carina Witthöft	(Slovakia) Dominika Cibulková [12]	(Ukraine) Elina Svitolina [22]	(United States) Catherine Bellis (Q)
2nd round out
(United States) Vania King (WC)	(Czech Republic) Denisa Allertová	(China) Wang Qiang	(Australia) Samantha Stosur [16]
(Serbia) Jelena Janković	(Germany) Annika Beck	(Netherlands) Richèl Hogenkamp (Q)	(Czech Republic) Lucie Šafářová
(United Kingdom) Naomi Broady	(Czech Republic) Kateřina Siniaková	(Japan) Kurumi Nara	(Switzerland) Timea Bacsinszky [15]
(Paraguay) Montserrat González (Q)	(France) Kristina Mladenovic	(United States) Nicole Gibbs	(Germany) Julia Görges
(United States) Kayla Day (WC)	(China) Duan Yingying (Q)	(Romania) Ana Bogdan (Q)	(Russia) Svetlana Kuznetsova [9]
(Bulgaria) Tsvetana Pironkova	(Germany) Andrea Petkovic	(China) Zheng Saisai	(Spain) Garbiñe Muguruza [3]
(United States) Christina McHale	(Kazakhstan) Yulia Putintseva	(China) Wang Yafan (Q)	(Russia) Evgeniya Rodina
(Turkey) Çağla Büyükakçay	(United States) Lauren Davis (WC)	(United States) Shelby Rogers	(Croatia) Mirjana Lučić-Baroni
1st round out
(Russia) Ekaterina Makarova	(Germany) Antonia Lottner (Q)	(Italy) Karin Knapp	(Serbia) Ana Ivanovic [29]
(Russia) Daria Kasatkina [23]	(Spain) Lara Arruabarrena	(Australia) Ellen Perez (WC)	(Italy) Camila Giorgi
(Brazil) Teliana Pereira	(Colombia) Mariana Duque Mariño	(Argentina) Nadia Podoroska (Q)	(Estonia) Anett Kontaveit
(Austria) Barbara Haas (Q)	(United Kingdom) Heather Watson	(Australia) Daria Gavrilova	(Belgium) Kirsten Flipkens
(United States) Jessica Pegula (Q)	(United Kingdom) Laura Robson (Q)	(Canada) Eugenie Bouchard	(France) Pauline Parmentier
(Netherlands) Kiki Bertens [20]	(Switzerland) Stefanie Vögele	(China) Peng Shuai (PR)	(Russia) Vitalia Diatchenko (PR)
(United States) Sofia Kenin (WC)	(Montenegro) Danka Kovinić	(Japan) Nao Hibino	(United States) Louisa Chirico
(Romania) Patricia Maria Țig	(Serbia) Aleksandra Krunić (Q)	(Belgium) Yanina Wickmayer	(Ukraine) Kateryna Kozlova
(United States) Alison Riske	(United States) Madison Brengle	(Greece) Maria Sakkari	(United States) Coco Vandeweghe [28]
(Czech Republic) Barbora Strýcová [18]	(Romania) Sorana Cîrstea (Q)	(United States) Taylor Townsend (Q)	(Italy) Francesca Schiavone
(United States) Bethanie Mattek-Sands (WC)	(France) Virginie Razzano (WC)	(Slovakia) Kristína Kučová (Q)	(United States) Samantha Crawford
(Puerto Rico) Monica Puig [32]	(Chinese Taipei) Hsieh Su-wei	(Slovakia) Anna Karolína Schmiedlová	(Belgium) Elise Mertens (Q)
(Germany) Anna-Lena Friedsam	(Germany) Mona Barthel	(Germany) Sabine Lisicki	(Japan) Misaki Doi [30]
(Romania) Irina-Camelia Begu [21]	(Belgium) Alison Van Uytvanck (LL)	(United States) Danielle Collins (WC)	(Poland) Magda Linette
(Latvia) Jeļena Ostapenko	(United States) Irina Falconi	(Belarus) Aliaksandra Sasnovich	(Luxembourg) Mandy Minella (Q)
(Italy) Sara Errani [27]	(Switzerland) Viktorija Golubic	(France) Alizé Cornet	(Slovenia) Polona Hercog

== Day-by-day summaries ==
=== Before the tournament ===
- 5-time champion Roger Federer withdrew from the tournament due to a knee injury.
- 2009 champion Juan Martín del Potro returned to the tournament for the first time in three years after an intensive injury, receiving a Wild Card entry.
- 2012 semifinalist Tomáš Berdych withdrew from the tournament due to an appendicitis sustained at the Western & Southern Open.

=== Day 1 ===
- Çağla Büyükakçay became the first Turkish woman to reach the second round in the US Open after defeating Irina Falconi in straight sets.
- 61st-ranked Zheng Saisai defeated reigning Olympic gold medalist Monica Puig in straight sets. This was the first time that a defending female Olympic gold medalist has lost in the opening round of the US Open.

=== Day 3 ===
- 48th-ranked Anastasija Sevastova defeated the 2016 French Open champion and No. 3 seed Garbiñe Muguruza in two sets in the second round. This was the first time since 2011 that the reigning French Open champion lost early in the same tournament.
- Kateryna Bondarenko's second round match against World No. 61 Zheng Saisai saw a fan try to jump out and attempt to engage Bondarenko after the match ended. The fan was reported to be a man named Sam Hu, a tennis academy owner originally from Shanghai, China currently living in Long Island, New York, but was arrested.

=== Day 7 ===
- Lucas Pouille defeated 14-time Slam champion Rafael Nadal in five sets, marking the first time since 2004 that Nadal failed to reach the Grand Slam quarterfinal at least in a single season. Pouille advanced to his first US Open quarterfinal.
- Sevastova became the first Latvian woman to reach the US Open quarterfinal after she defeated Johanna Konta in the fourth round. She is the first Latvian female quarterfinalist since Larisa Neiland in 1994 Wimbledon Championships.
- French veterans Jo-Wilfried Tsonga and Gaël Monfils advanced to the quarterfinals as well, joined compatriot Pouille at the top half of the men's singles draw, making them the first time three French quarterfinalists at the US Open.

=== Day 8 ===
- Serena Williams won her 308th Grand Slam match record after defeating Yaroslava Shvedova in two sets, surpassing Roger Federer's all-time record in the Open Era.
- Ana Konjuh defeated Agnieszka Radwańska in two sets and the first Croatian woman to reach the US Open quarterfinal, this made her best result in Grand Slam.

=== Day 9 ===
- In the men's draw, Novak Djokovic is the only player from the Big Four advanced to the semifinal after Jo-Wilfried Tsonga retired due to his left knee. This meant the first time since 2004 French Open neither Federer, Nadal and Andy Murray moved to the semifinal.

=== Day 11 ===
- Karolína Plíšková defeated six-time champion Serena Williams in two sets to make through on her first Grand Slam final. This was the first time since 2009 which Kim Clijsters defeated both the Williams sisters in the same tournament in which Plíšková defeated Venus Williams in the fourth round.
- Angelique Kerber defeated two-time finalist Caroline Wozniacki in two sets to make through on her third Grand Slam final. Kerber claimed the number 1 title following her victory, overtaking Serena Williams' 186-week streak at number 1.

== Champions ==
=== Seniors ===
==== Men's singles ====
- (Switzerland) Stan Wawrinka def. (Serbia) Novak Djokovic, 6–7^{(1–7)}, 6–4, 7–5, 6–3

The two players had met 23 times prior, with Djokovic winning on 19 occasions. This was Wawrinka's first appearance in the final of the tournament. Defending champion Djokovic started well, taking Wawrinka's first service game. Djokovic lost an opportunity to serve out the first set, and the set went into a tie-break. There Wawrinka won the third point but lost another seven, and Djokovic took the first set. In the second set, Wawrinka broke first to lead 3–1. Djokovic broke back and held serve to draw at 4–4, but lost his subsequent serve to allow Wawrinka to take the second set 6–4. Djokovic soon trailed 3–0 at the beginning of the third set but leveled it at 5–5. Wawrinka again broke serve in the final game to take the third set 7–5. Wawrinka started the fourth set like the last two, breaking Djokovic's first service game to lead 3–0. Djokovic received two medical timeouts midway through but was unable to prevent Wawrinka from winning the set 6–3 and his first US Open title.

==== Women's singles ====
- (Germany) Angelique Kerber def. (Czech Republic) Karolína Plíšková, 6–3, 4–6, 6–4

Kerber started the match as favorite to win, having assured the No. 1 women's ranking on September 12. Plíšková reached her first grand slam final, having never previously made it past the third round, by beating home favorite Serena Williams in the semi-finals. Kerber started strongly, breaking Plíšková's first service game and won the first set 6–3 with another break in serve. Plíšková fought back, breaking midway into the second set to take it into a deciding set. In the third set, Plíšková broke Kerber's second service game to lead, before Kerber leveled the set at 3–3. With the match at 5–4, Plíšková served to stay in the match but Kerber won it in a love game to secure her first US Open title.

==== Men's doubles ====
- (United Kingdom) Jamie Murray / (Brazil) Bruno Soares def. (Spain) Pablo Carreño Busta / (Spain) Guillermo García-López, 6–2, 6–3

==== Women's doubles ====
- (United States) Bethanie Mattek-Sands / (Czech Republic) Lucie Šafářová def. (France) Caroline Garcia / (France) Kristina Mladenovic, 2–6, 7–6^{(7–5)}, 6–4

==== Mixed doubles ====
- (Germany) Laura Siegemund / (Croatia) Mate Pavić def. (United States) Coco Vandeweghe / (United States) Rajeev Ram, 6–4, 6–4

=== Juniors ===
==== Boys' singles ====
- (Canada) Félix Auger-Aliassime def. (Serbia) Miomir Kecmanović, 6–3, 6–0

==== Girls' singles ====
- (United States) Kayla Day def. (Slovakia) Viktória Kužmová, 6–3, 6–2

==== Boys' doubles ====
- (Bolivia) Juan Carlos Aguilar / (Brazil) Felipe Meligeni Alves def. (Canada) Félix Auger-Aliassime / (Canada) Benjamin Sigouin, 6–3, 7–6^{(7–4)}

==== Girls' doubles ====
- (United States) Jada Hart / (United States) Ena Shibahara def. (United States) Kayla Day / (United States) Caroline Dolehide, 4–6, 6–2, [13–11]

=== Invitation ===
==== Men's champions doubles ====
- (Australia) Pat Cash / (Australia) Mark Philippoussis def. (United States) John McEnroe / (United States) Patrick McEnroe, 6–3, 6–4

==== Women's champions doubles ====
- (United States) Lindsay Davenport / (United States) Mary Joe Fernández def. (United States) Martina Navratilova / (Spain) Arantxa Sánchez Vicario, 6–4, 6–2

== See also ==
- US Open (tennis)

== Notes ==
Preceded by 2016 Wimbledon Championships	Grand Slams	Succeeded by 2017 Australian Open
Preceded by 2015 US Open	US Open	Succeeded by 2017 US Open
