= Kourtney Keegan =

American tennis player

Kourtney Kuhlman
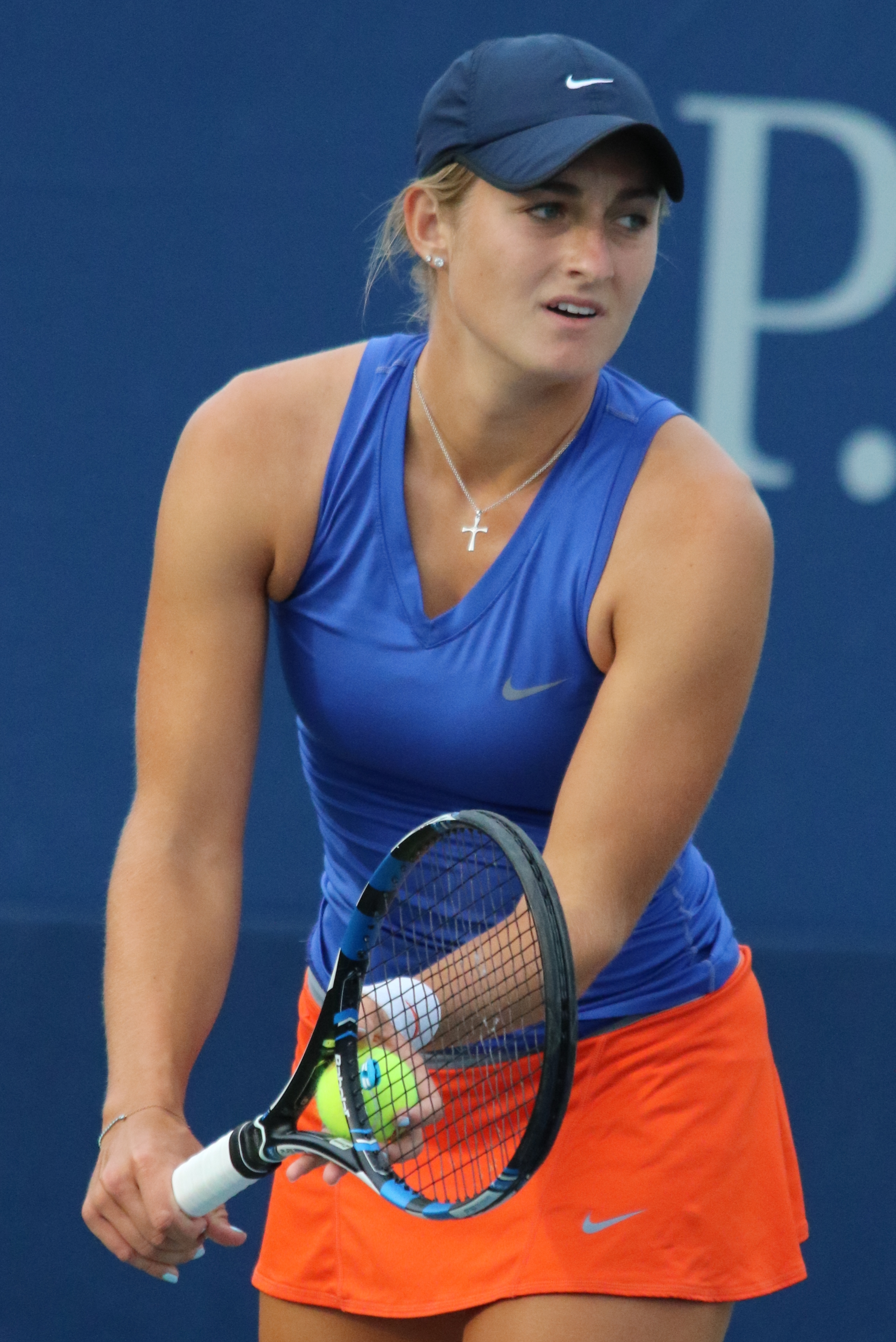
- Keegan at the 2016 US Open
- Full name: Kourtney Jean Keegan
- Country (sports): United States
- Residence: Roswell, Georgia, United States
- Born: 7 September 1994 (age 31) Chicago, United States
- Height: 1.80 m (5 ft 11 in)
- Plays: Right-handed (two handed-backhand)
- College: University of Florida (2013–current)
- Prize money: $1,012

Singles
- Career record: 9–5
- Career titles: 0

Doubles
- Career record: 0–1
- Career titles: 0

Grand Slam doubles results
- US Open: 1R (2016)
- Last updated on: 1 September 2016.

Kourtney Jean Keegan (born 7 September 1994) is an American former tennis player. Kourtney was born in Chicago, Illinois. She spent some of her youth in Jacksonville, FL before moving back to Chicago, before finally settling down in Roswell, GA throughout high school before going to the University of Florida to play tennis where she won a National Championship.

Keegan made her Grand Slam main draw debut at the 2016 US Open in the doubles event, partnering Brooke Austin.

She graduated from the University of Florida with a major in Sports Management in 2017, and currently resides in Jacksonville, serving as the tournament services coordinator for The Players Championship.
