= Brooke Austin =

American tennis player (born 1996)

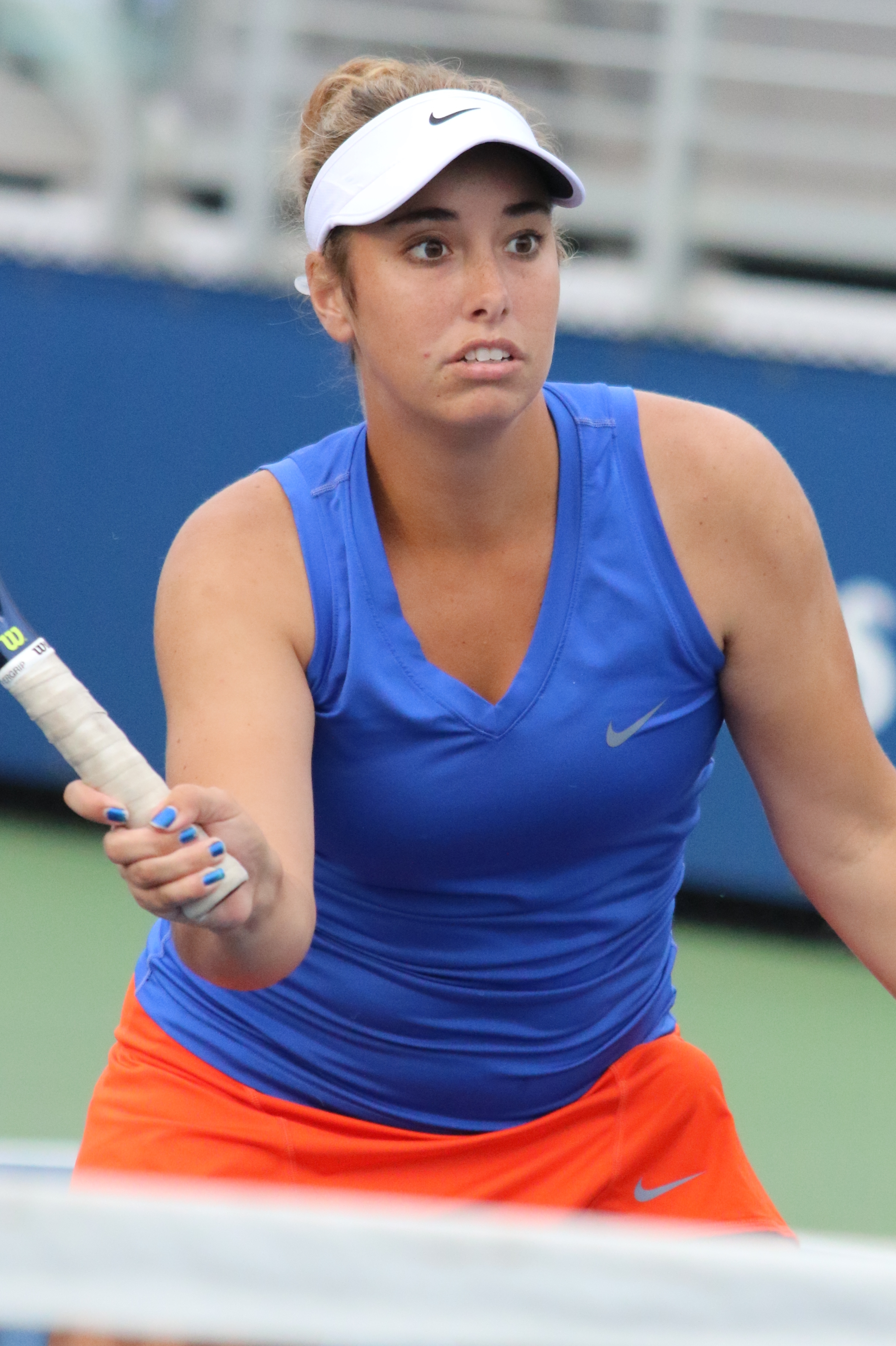
- Austin at the 2016 US Open
- Full name: Brooke Irene Austin
- Country (sports): United States
- Residence: Indianapolis, United States
- Born: 12 February 1996 (age 29) Indianapolis
- Height: 1.66 m (5 ft 5 in)
- Plays: Right-handed (two handed-backhand)
- College: University of Florida (2014–)
- Prize money: $39,472

Singles
- Career record: 69–52
- Career titles: 1 ITF
- Highest ranking: No. 424 (26 August 2013)

Grand Slam singles results
- US Open: Q2 (2012)

Doubles
- Career record: 20–16
- Career titles: 2 ITF
- Highest ranking: No. 638 (27 May 2013)

Grand Slam doubles results
- US Open: 1R (2016)

Brooke Irene Austin (born 12 February 1996) is an American former tennis player.

Austin has a career-high singles ranking by the WTA of 424, achieved on 26 August 2013. She also has a career-high WTA doubles ranking of 638, achieved on 27 May 2013. Austin has won one singles title and two doubles titles on the ITF Circuit.

She made her Grand Slam main-draw debut at the 2016 US Open in the doubles event, partnering Kourtney Keegan.

Austin graduated from the University of Florida where she won the NCAA Division I Women's Tennis Championship in 2019 with a degree in Sociology, and has since started working for the United States Tennis Association.

== ITF Circuit finals ==
=== Singles (1–3) ===
Legend $25,000 tournaments $10,000 tournaments	Finals by surface Hard (1–3) Clay (0–0)

Result	Date	Tier	Tournament	Surface	Opponent	Score
Loss	May 2013	10,000	ITF Sumter, United States	Hard	(United States) Jamie Loeb	4–6, 3–6
Loss	Jul 2013	10,000	ITF Evansville, United States	Hard	(United States) Emina Bektas	6–4, 4–6, 3–6
Win	May 2014	10,000	ITF Sumter, United States	Hard	(United States) Nadja Gilchrist	7–6^{(5)}, 2–6, 6–1
Loss	Jun 2015	25,000	ITF Baton Rouge, United States	Hard	(United States) Danielle Lao	5–7, 3–6

=== Doubles (2–2) ===
Legend $25,000 tournaments $10,000 tournaments	Finals by surface Hard (1–2) Clay (1–0)

Result	No.	Date	Tier	Tournament	Surface	Partner	Opponents	Score
Win	1.	Jun 2011	10,000	ITF Cleveland, United States	Clay	(Australia) Brooke Bolender	(New Zealand) Dianne Hollands (India) Shikha Uberoi	7–6^{(2)}, 6–3
Loss	2.	Oct 2012	25,000	ITF Florence, United States	Hard	(United States) Hayley Carter	(Norway) Ulrikke Eikeri (Japan) Akiko Omae	1–6, 1–6
Loss	3.	May 2013	10,000	ITF Landisville, United States	Hard	(Australia) Brooke Rischbiet	(Bolivia) María Fernanda Álvarez Terán (United States) Keri Wong	6–2, 4–6, [5–10]
Win	4.	Jul 2014	10,000	ITF Evansville, United States	Hard	(United States) Natalie Pluskota	(United States) Catherine Harrison (United States) Mary Weatherholt	6–4, 3–6, [11–9]
