= Andy Brandi =

Puerto Rican tennis player (1950/1951 – 2024)

Biographical details
- Born: 1952; San Juan, Puerto Rico
- Died: February 8, 2024 (aged 72)

Playing career
- 1972–1975: Trinity (TX)

Coaching career (HC unless noted)
- 1985–2001: Florida
- 2017–2022: LSU

Accomplishments and honors

Championships
- NCAA (1992, 1996, 1998); Southeastern Conference (1985, 1986, 1987, 1988, 1990, 1991, 1992, 1993, 1995, 1996, 1997, 1998, 1999, 2001); Southeastern Conference Tournament (1990, 1991, 1992, 1993, 1995, 1996, 1997, 1998, 2000)

Awards
- SEC Coach of the Year (1987, 1988, 1993, 1996, 1998); USPTA National Coach of the Year (1988); USPTR National Coach of the Year (1996, 1998); ITA National Coach of the Year (1989, 1996); University of Florida Athletic Hall of Fame

Andres V. Brandi (1952 – February 8, 2024) was an American college and professional tennis coach. He led Florida Gators women's tennis team to win multiple National Collegiate Athletic Association (NCAA) national tournament championships in the 1990s.

== Early life and education ==
Brandi was born in San Juan, Puerto Rico. He attended Trinity University in San Antonio, Texas, where he played for the Trinity Tigers men's tennis team in NCAA Division I competition. Brandi graduated from Trinity University with a bachelor's degree in business administration in 1975.

In his early 20s, Brandi trained with Australian tennis player - Harry Hopman.

== Coaching career ==
Brandi was a touring professional for several years after graduating from college, but quickly discovered his true calling was refining the technique and improving the play of other up-and-coming professional tennis players. Notably, he coached Kathy Rinaldi and Carling Bassett. Brandi was also the executive director of IMG Bollettieri Tennis Academy in Bradenton, Florida.

Brandi became the head coach of the Florida Gators women's tennis team at the University of Florida in Gainesville, Florida in August 1984. From the 1985 season through 2001, he built the Lady Gators tennis program from a strong regional team into a national powerhouse, second only to the national rival Stanford Cardinal women's tennis team. His teams won three NCAA national tournament championships (1992, 1996, 1998) and were the runners-up in five other NCAA tournaments (1988, 1990, 1995, 1997, 1999). Brandi's Lady Gators also won six National Indoor Tennis Championships and fourteen Southeastern Conference (SEC) championships, and never finished lower than second in the SEC regular season standings.

In 1988 two Lady Gators players: Shaun Stafford and Halle Cioffi, played against each other in the individual NCAA singles championship final. Lisa Raymond (1992, 1993) and Jill Craybas (1996) also won individual NCAA singles championships during Brandi's tenure. In NCAA doubles championship play, three Brandi-coached doubles teams won four NCAA doubles championships: Jillian Alexander and Nicole Arendt in 1991; Dawn Buth and Stephanie Nickitas in 1996 and 1997; along with Whitney Laiho and Jessica Lehnhoff in 2001.

At the time of his resignation from the Gators coaching staff, he had the highest winning percentage (.915) of any coach in NCAA tennis history, and had the fifth highest number of career victories (460) among all NCAA coaches who have coached for at least 5 years. He was inducted into the University of Florida Athletic Hall of Fame as an "honorary letter winner" in 2006.

After leaving the University of Florida, Brandi has worked for IMG Academy, the Chris Everett Tennis Academy, and the Harold Solomon Tennis Institute. Later, he was a member of the player development staff and a national coach at the United States Tennis Association.

On June 13, 2017, Andy Brandi and Chris Brandi were named co-head coaches for the LSU Tigers tennis team.

== Coaching record ==
| School | Year | Overall | Conference Record | Postseason |
|---|---|---|---|---|
| Florida | 1985 | 21-6 | 8-0 | NCAA Quarterfinals |
| Florida | 1986 | 17-7 | 9-0 | DNP |
| Florida | 1987 | 29-1 | 9-0 | NCAA Semifinals |
| Florida | 1988 | 29-2 | 9-0 | NCAA Runner-Up |
| Florida | 1989 | 26-3 | 9-0 | NCAA Semifinals |
| Florida | 1990 | 32-3 | 11-1 | NCAA Runner-Up |
| Florida | 1991 | 31-1 | 11-1 | NCAA Semifinals |
| Florida | 1992 | 30-0 | 14-0 | NCAA Champions |
| Florida | 1993 | 26-2 | 14-0 | NCAA Semifinals |
| Florida | 1994 | 23-6 | 12-2 | NCAA Quarterfinals |
| Florida | 1995 | 27-3 | 14-0 | NCAA Runner-Up |
| Florida | 1996 | 31-0 | 14-0 | NCAA Champions |
| Florida | 1997 | 31-1 | 14-0 | NCAA Runner-Up |
| Florida | 1998 | 27-0 | 14-0 | NCAA Champions |
| Florida | 1999 | 31-2 | 13-1 | NCAA Runner-Up |
| Florida | 2000 | 25-3 | 10-1 | NCAA Semifinals |
| Florida | 2001 | 24-3 | 11-0 | NCAA Semifinals |
| LSU | 2017 | | | |
| LSU | 2018 | | | |
| LSU | 2019 | | | |
| LSU | 2020 | | | |
| LSU | 2021 | | | |
| LSU | 2022 | | | |
| | Total: | 460-43 | 196-6 | |

== Personal life ==
Brandi and his wife Nancy had one son, Chris, who played for coach Andy Jackson's Florida Gators men's tennis team from 2003 to 2006. Chris Brandi was previously an assistant coach for the Wake Forest Demon Deacons men's tennis team before becoming co-head coach for the men's tennis team at LSU with his father. Andy Brandi's niece, Kristina Brandi, is a former touring professional who was ranked as high as twenty-seventh in the world.

Andy Brandi died on February 8, 2024, at the age of 72.

== See also ==
- Florida Gators
- List of Florida Gators tennis players
- List of University of Florida Athletic Hall of Fame members
- List of Puerto Ricans
- LSU Tigers
