= Florida Gators tennis =

Florida Gators tennis may refer to:

- Florida Gators men's tennis, the University of Florida men's tennis team
- Florida Gators women's tennis, the school's women's tennis team
