= 1988 Eckerd Open – Singles =

Singles
- 1988 Eckerd Open
- 1987 Champion: (United States) Chris Evert-Lloyd

Final
- Champion: (United States) Chris Evert
- Runner-up: (Spain) Arantxa Sánchez
- Score: 7–6, 6–4

Events
Singles	Doubles
← 1987 ·	Eckerd Open	· 1989 →

Chris Evert was the defending champion and won in the final 7–6, 6–4 against Arantxa Sánchez.

== Seeds ==
A champion seed is indicated in bold text while text in italics indicates the round in which that seed was eliminated.

1. (United States) **Chris Evert (champion)**
2. (Bulgaria) Manuela Maleeva (quarterfinals)
3. (West Germany) Claudia Kohde-Kilsch (first round)
4. (United States) Zina Garrison (first round)
5. (Bulgaria) Katerina Maleeva (quarterfinals)
6. (West Germany) Sylvia Hanika (quarterfinals)
7. (West Germany) Isabel Cueto (second round)
8. (Austria) Judith Wiesner (first round)

== Draw ==
=== Key ===
- Q = Qualifier
- WC = Wild card
- LL = Lucky loser
- Alt = Alternate
- SE = Special exempt
- PR = Protected ranking
- ITF = ITF entry
- JE = Junior exempt
- w/o = Walkover
- r = Retired
- d = Defaulted
- SR = Special ranking

First round
1	(United States) **C Evert**	**6**	**6**
(United States) M Torres	2	0
Q	(Argentina) A Villagrán	**6**	2	2
Q	(Italy) **F Bonsignori**	0	**6**	**6**
(United States) H Na	5	3
(South Africa) **R Fairbank**	**7**	**6**
(United States) L Bonder	1	0
6	(West Germany) **S Hanika**	**6**	**6**
4	(United States) Z Garrison	1	3
(United States) **H Cioffi**	**6**	**6**
(South Africa) **E Reinach**	**6**	**6**
(United States) M L Daniels	4	1
(Socialist Federal Republic of Yugoslavia) **S Goleš**	**6**	**7**
(United States) D Faber	2	5
(West Germany) **W Probst**	**6**	**6**
8	(Austria) J Wiesner	1	4
5	(Bulgaria) **K Maleeva**	**6**	**6**
Q	(United States) K Adams	0	0
(Austria) **P Huber**	**6**	**6**
(Poland) I Kuczyńska	4	4
(Spain) **A Sánchez**	**6**	**6**
Q	(Czechoslovakia) A Holíková	3	2
(Argentina) **B Fulco**	**6**	**6**
3	(West Germany) C Kohde-Kilsch	2	1
7	(West Germany) **I Cueto**	**6**	**6**
(United States) T Phelps	1	2
(Argentina) **P Tarabini**	**6**	**7**
(United States) B Bowes	1	6
(United States) C Benjamin	3	6
(United States) **K Horvath**	**6**	**7**
(Argentina) M Paz	3	0
2	(Bulgaria) **K Maleeva**	**6**	**6**

Second round
1	(United States) **C Evert**	**6**	**6**
Q	(Italy) F Bonsignori	2	4
(South Africa) R Fairbank	**6**	4	3
6	(West Germany) **S Hanika**	3	**6**	**6**
(United States) **H Cioffi**	**6**	**6**
(South Africa) E Reinach	2	2
(Socialist Federal Republic of Yugoslavia) S Goleš	5	**7**	6
(West Germany) **W Probst**	**7**	6	**7**
5	(Bulgaria) **K Maleeva**	6	**6**	**6**
(Austria) P Huber	**7**	3	1
(Spain) **A Sánchez**	**6**	**6**
(Argentina) B Fulco	1	3
7	(West Germany) I Cueto	1	1
(Argentina) **P Tarabini**	**6**	**6**
(United States) K Horvath	2	5
2	(Bulgaria) **M Maleeva**	**6**	**7**

Quarterfinals
1	(United States) **C Evert**	**6**	**6**
6	(West Germany) S Hanika	1	0
(United States) **H Cioffi**	**7**	**6**
(West Germany) W Probst	5	2
5	(Bulgaria) K Maleeva	2	2
(Spain) **A Sánchez**	**6**	**6**
(Argentina) **P Tarabini**	**7**	2	**7**
2	(Bulgaria) M Maleeva	6	**6**	6

Semifinals
1	(United States) **C Evert**	**6**	**6**
(United States) H Cioffi	2	2
(Spain) **A Sánchez**	**6**	**6**
(Argentina) P Tarabini	2	2

Final
1	(United States) **Chris Evert**	**7**	**6**
(Spain) Arantxa Sánchez	6	4
