= Linder Stadium at Ring Tennis Complex =

Tennis facility in Gainesville, Florida

Linder Stadium at Alfred A. Ring Tennis Complex
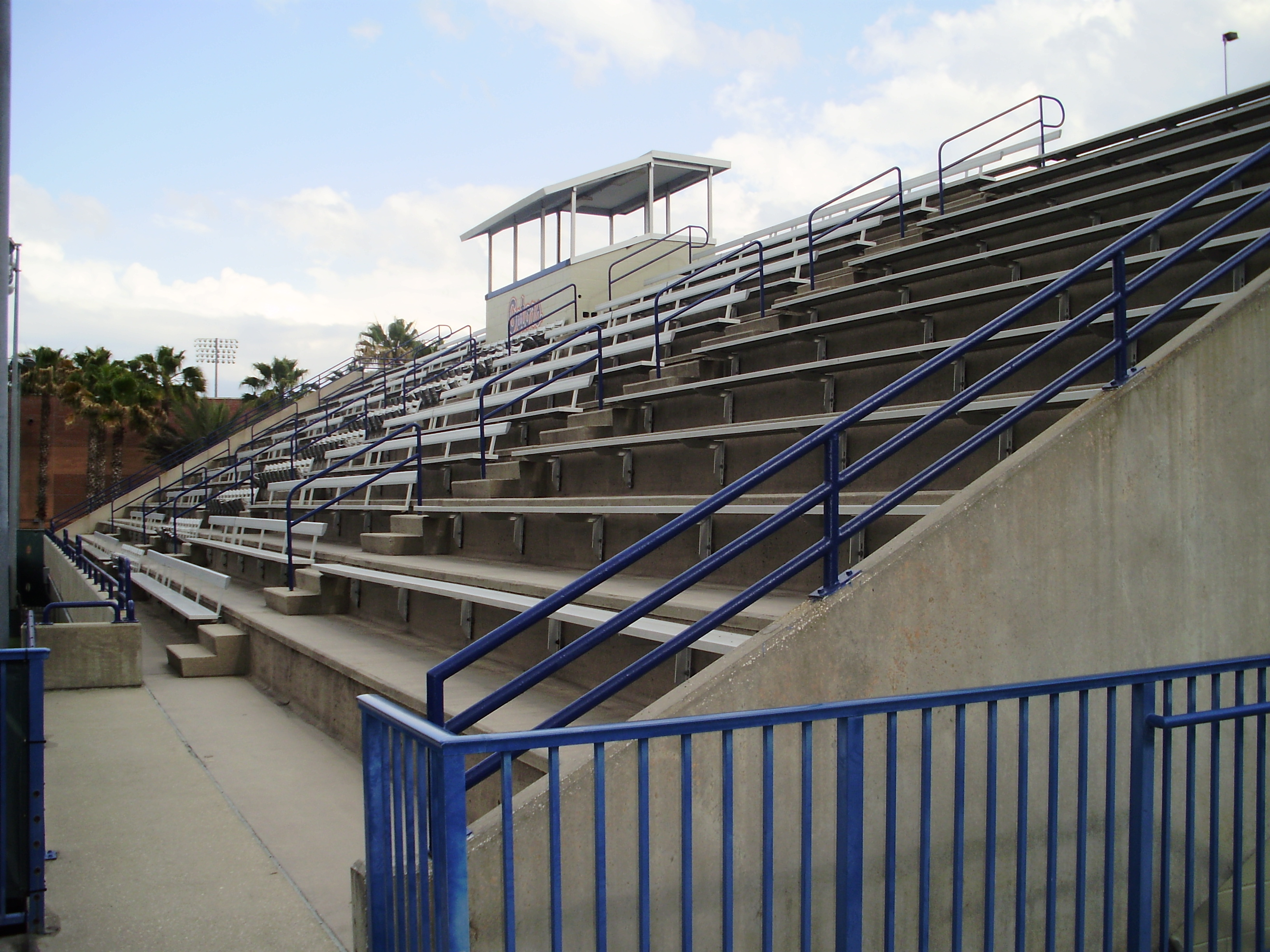
- Interactive map of Linder Stadium at Alfred A. Ring Tennis Complex
- Location: Gainesville, Florida
- Coordinates: 29°39′0″N 82°21′24″W
- Owner: University of Florida
- Capacity: 1,000
- Surface: Hard court surface
- Field size: 7,163 sq ft (665.5 m^{2})

Construction
- Opened: 1987
- Renovated: 1999

Tenants
- Florida Gators men's tennis Florida Gators women's tennis

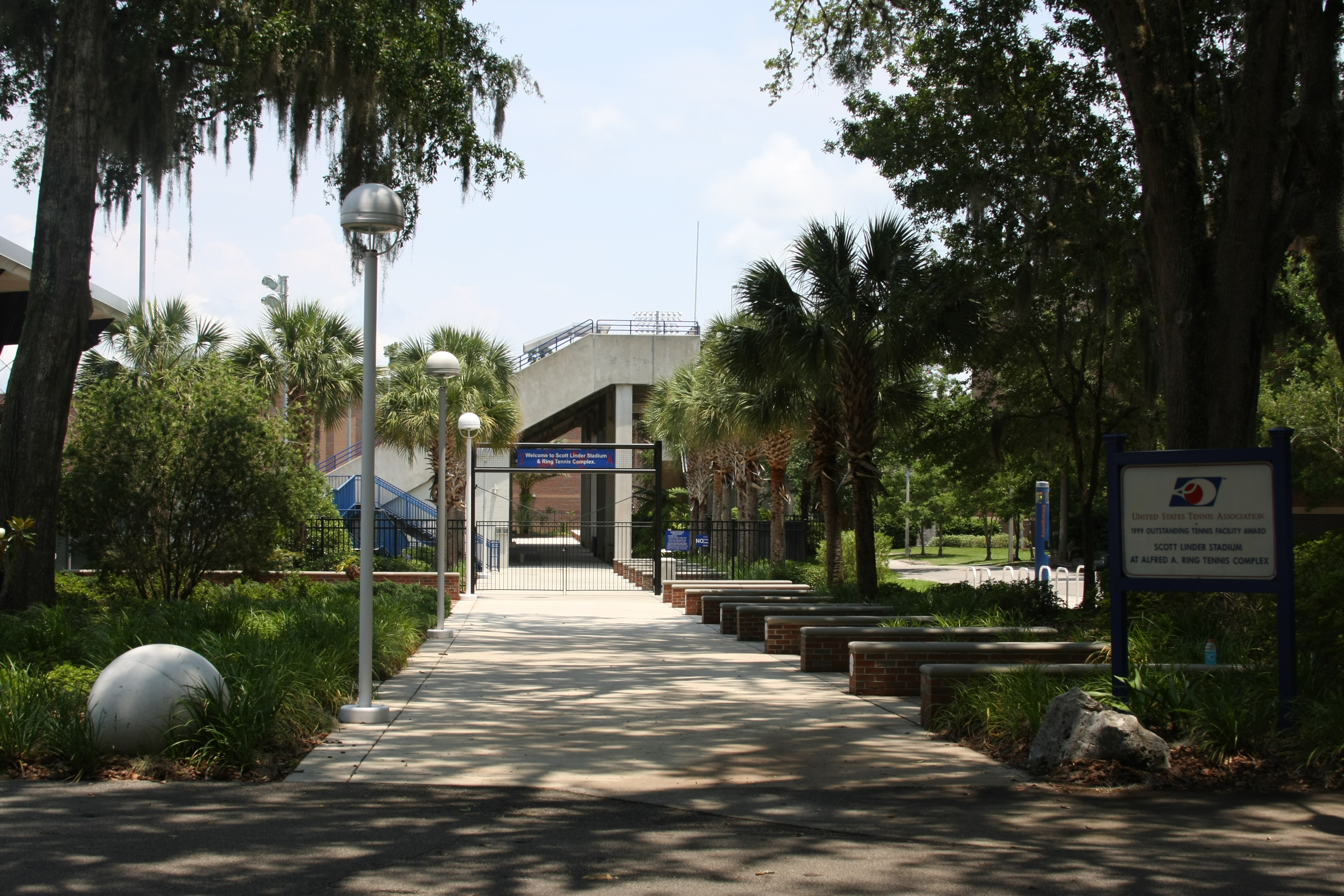
Outside Linder Stadium

Linder Stadium at the Ring Tennis Complex is the intercollegiate tennis facility at the University of Florida in Gainesville, Florida. It is home stadium and training facility for the Florida Gators women's tennis and the Florida Gators men's tennis teams.

== Stadium ==
Linder Stadium is a 1,000-seat tennis stadium within the Ring Tennis Complex located on S.W. Second Avenue on the northern edge of the University of Florida's Gainesville, Florida campus. The stadium, named for donor R. Scott Linder, was built in 1987 and includes six lighted courts and a spectator grandstand.

== Renovation ==
In 1999, the Linder Stadium was renovated as part of a $1.7 million project that created the Alfred Ring Tennis Complex, named in honor of Dr. Alfred A. Ring, a university benefactor. A pressbox was constructed atop the grandstand, and scoreboards were added for each of the original six courts. New restrooms and concession stands are located under the grandstand.

A second row of nine courts was built, with three of the courts covered by the new Ring Pavilion. This building is the primary training facility for the men's and women's teams, and includes training rooms, locker rooms and coaches' offices. Overall, the building covers 7,160 square feet (665 m^{2}). A 3,000-square-foot (280 m^{2}) courtyard was also constructed.

== Facility awards ==
Following its renovation, the Ring Tennis Complex received a Silver Award for beautification from the city of Gainesville. Also in 1999, the United States Tennis Association named the Ring Tennis Complex as an Outstanding Tennis Facility. The complex also was honored with the Facility of Merit Award from Athletic Business magazine in 2001.

== See also ==
- Bryan Shelton
- Buildings at the University of Florida
- Florida Gators
- History of the University of Florida
- Roland Thornqvist
- University Athletic Association
