= Thörnqvist =

Thörnqvist or Thornqvist is a Swedish surname that may refer to:

- Jan Thörnqvist (born 1959), Swedish Navy vice admiral
- Owe Thörnqvist (born 1929), Swedish singer-songwriter and revue artist
- Roland Thornqvist (born 1970), American college tennis coach and college tennis player
