= 1988 Eckerd Open – Doubles =

Doubles
- 1988 Eckerd Open
- 1987 Champions: (United States) Chris Evert-Lloyd (Australia) Wendy Turnbull

Final
- Champions: (United States) Terry Phelps (Italy) Raffaella Reggi
- Runners-up: (United States) Cammy MacGregor (United States) Cynthia MacGregor
- Score: 6–2, 6–4

Events
| Singles | Doubles |
| ← 1987 · | Eckerd Open | · 1989 → |

Chris Evert and Wendy Turnbull were the defending champions but did not compete that year.

Terry Phelps and Raffaella Reggi won in the final 6–2, 6–4 against Cammy MacGregor and Cynthia MacGregor.

== Seeds ==
Champion seeds are indicated in bold text while text in italics indicates the round in which those seeds were eliminated.

1. (South Africa) Rosalyn Fairbank / (West Germany) Eva Pfaff (semifinals)
2. (United States) Mary Lou Daniels / (United States) Kathleen Horvath (quarterfinals)
3. (United States) Katrina Adams / (United States) Penny Barg (semifinals)
4. (United States) Cammy MacGregor / (United States) Cynthia MacGregor (final)

== Draw ==
=== Key ===
- Q = Qualifier
- WC = Wild card
- LL = Lucky loser
- Alt = Alternate
- SE = Special exempt
- PR = Protected ranking
- ITF = ITF entry
- JE = Junior exempt
- w/o = Walkover
- r = Retired
- d = Defaulted
- SR = Special ranking

First round
1 | (South Africa) **R Fairbank** (West Germany) **E Pfaff** | **6** | **7**
(Socialist Federal Republic of Yugoslavia) S Goleš (Argentina) P Tarabini | 3 | 6
(Bulgaria) **K Maleeva** (South Africa) **D van Rensburg** | **6** | **6**
(Argentina) B Fulco (United States) E Raponi-Longo | 4 | 1
4 | (United States) **Ca MacGregor** (United States) **Cy MacGregor** | **6** | **6**
(United States) M Brown (United States) D Faber | 1 | 3
(Argentina) **M Paz** (West Germany) **W Probst** | **6** | **6**
(Canada) H Kelesi (South Africa) E Reinach | 1 | 4
(West Germany) A Betzner (Austria) J Wiesner | 5 | 5
(West Germany) **I Cueto** (Spain) **A Sánchez** | **7** | **7**
(United States) B Bowes (United States) H Na | **7** | 6 | 0
3 | (United States) **K Adams** (United States) **P Barg** | 6 | **7** | **6**
(United States) C Benjamin (United States) J Kaplan | 6 | 1
(United States) **T Phelps** (Italy) **R Reggi** | **7** | **6**
(United States) K Sands (United States) N Sodupe | 6 | 3
2 | (United States) **M L Daniels** (United States) **K Horvath** | **7** | **6**

Quarterfinals
1 | (South Africa) **R Fairbank** (West Germany) **E Pfaff** | **6** | **6**
(Bulgaria) K Maleeva (South Africa) D van Rensburg | 2 | 1
4 | (United States) **Ca MacGregor** (United States) **Cy MacGregor** | **6** | **7**
(Argentina) M Paz (West Germany) W Probst | 3 | 6
(West Germany) I Cueto (Spain) A Sánchez | 3 | **7** | 1
3 | (United States) **K Adams** (United States) **P Barg** | **6** | 6 | **6**
(United States) **T Phelps** (Italy) **R Reggi** | **7** | **6**
2 | (United States) M L Daniels (United States) K Horvath | 5 | 4

Semifinals
1 | (South Africa) R Fairbank (West Germany) E Pfaff | 6 | 3
4 | (United States) **Ca MacGregor** (United States) **Cy MacGregor** | **7** | **6**
3 | (United States) K Adams (United States) P Barg | 2 | **6** | 3
(United States) **T Phelps** (Italy) **R Reggi** | **6** | 1 | **6**

Final
4 | (United States) Cammy MacGregor (United States) Cynthia MacGregor | 2 | 4
(United States) **Terry Phelps** (Italy) **Raffaella Reggi** | **6** | **6**
