= 1989 Eckerd Open – Doubles =

Doubles
- 1989 Eckerd Open
- 1988 Champions: (United States) Terry Phelps (Italy) Raffaella Reggi

Final
- Champions: (Netherlands) Brenda Schultz (Hungary) Andrea Temesvári
- Runners-up: (United States) Elise Burgin (South Africa) Rosalyn Fairbank
- Score: 7–6, 6–4

Events
Singles	Doubles
← 1988 ·	Eckerd Open	· 1990 →

Terry Phelps and Raffaella Reggi were the defending champions but did not compete that year.

Brenda Schultz and Andrea Temesvári won in the final 7–6, 6–4 against Elise Burgin and Rosalyn Fairbank.

== Seeds ==
Champion seeds are indicated in bold text while text in italics indicates the round in which those seeds were eliminated.

1. (Soviet Union) Leila Meskhi / (Soviet Union) Larisa Savchenko (quarterfinals)
2. (United States) Elise Burgin / (South Africa) Rosalyn Fairbank (final)
3. (United States) Penny Barg / (United States) Ronni Reis (semifinals)
4. (United States) Mary Lou Daniels / (United States) Wendy White (quarterfinals)

== Draw ==
=== Key ===
- Q = Qualifier
- WC = Wild card
- LL = Lucky loser
- Alt = Alternate
- SE = Special exempt
- PR = Protected ranking
- ITF = ITF entry
- JE = Junior exempt
- w/o = Walkover
- r = Retired
- d = Defaulted
- SR = Special ranking

First round
1	(Soviet Union) **L Meskhi** (Soviet Union) **L Savchenko**	**6**	**6**
(United States) H Cioffi (United States) S Stafford	4	2
(Czechoslovakia) P Langrová (Czechoslovakia) J Pospíšilová	**6**	4	2
(Czechoslovakia) **I Budařová** (Bulgaria) **K Maleeva**	2	**6**	**6**
4	(United States) **M L Daniels** (United States) **W White**	**6**	**6**
(Argentina) B Fulco (Peru) P Vásquez	1	2
(Netherlands) **B Schultz** (Hungary) **A Temesvári**	**6**	**6**
(United States) K Foxworth (United States) J Thomas	3	4
(Italy) **S Cecchini** (Peru) **L Gildemeister**	**6**	**7**
(United States) A Grossman (Spain) A Sánchez	4	5
(West Germany) I Cueto (United States) H Na	0	2
3	(United States) **P Barg** (United States) **R Reis**	**6**	**6**
(Italy) **L Ferrando** (Argentina) **P Tarabini**	**6**	**7**
(United States) K Horvath (United States) A Leand	1	6
(United States) D Faber (United States) J Goodling	2	2
2	(United States) **E Burgin** (South Africa) **R Fairbank**	**6**	**6**

Quarterfinals
1	(Soviet Union) L Meskhi (Soviet Union) L Savchenko	1	**6**	6
(Czechoslovakia) **I Budařová** (Bulgaria) **K Maleeva**	**6**	1	**7**
4	(United States) M L Daniels (United States) W White	5	5
(Netherlands) **B Schultz** (Hungary) **A Temesvári**	**7**	**7**
(Italy) S Cecchini (Peru) L Gildemeister	5	4
3	(United States) **P Barg** (United States) **R Reis**	**7**	**6**
(Italy) L Ferrando (Argentina) P Tarabini	2	**7**	2
2	(United States) **E Burgin** (South Africa) **R Fairbank**	**6**	6	**6**

Semifinals
(Czechoslovakia) I Budařová (Bulgaria) K Maleeva	4	**6**	6
(Netherlands) **B Schultz** (Hungary) **A Temesvári**	**6**	3	**7**
3	(United States) P Barg (United States) R Reis	4	1
2	(United States) **E Burgin** (South Africa) **R Fairbank**	**6**	**6**

Final
(Netherlands) **Brenda Schultz** (Hungary) **Andrea Temesvári**	**7**	**6**
2	(United States) Elise Burgin (South Africa) Rosalyn Fairbank	6	4
