= Roland Thornqvist =

Swedish-American tennis player and coach (born 1970)

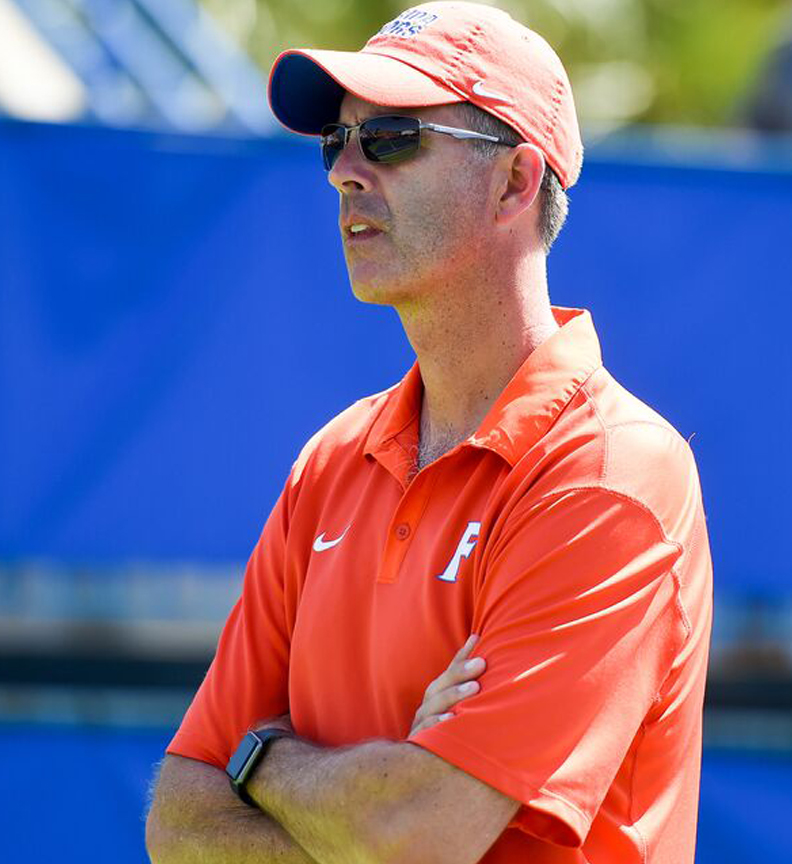

Current position
- Title: Head coach
- Team: Wesleyan University
- Conference: New England Small College Athletic Conference
- Record: 470–89 (.845)

Biographical details
- Born: March 3, 1970 (age 56); Stockholm, Sweden

Playing career
- 1993–1996: University of North Carolina

Coaching career (HC unless noted)
- 1997–1998: University of Kansas
- 1999–2001: University of North Carolina
- 2002–2024: University of Florida
- 2025–current: Wesleyan University

Head coaching record
- Overall: 545–139 (.797)

Accomplishments and honors

Championships
- NCAA (2003, 2011, 2012, 2017); Southeastern Conference (2003, 2004, 2006, 2007, 2008, 2010, 2011, 2012, 2013, 2015, 2016); Southeastern Conference Tournament (2002, 2003, 2004, 2005, 2006, 2010, 2011, 2012, 2013, 2016)

Awards
- SEC Coach of the Year (2004, 2006, 2010, 2013, 2016); ITA National Coach of the Year (2011)

Tennis career
- Prize money: $ 2,775

Singles
- Highest ranking: No. 303 (22 Nov 1993)

Grand Slam singles results
- US Open: Q1 (1994)

Doubles
- Highest ranking: No. 422 (11 Jul 1994)

Roland Thornqvist (born March 3, 1970) is a Swedish-born American college tennis coach and former college tennis player, who currently the head coach of the men's tennis team for Wesleyan University. He is best known for leading the Florida Gators women's tennis team of the University of Florida to National Collegiate Athletic Association (NCAA) Division I national championships in 2003, 2011, 2012, and 2017.

== Early years ==
Thornqvist was born in Stockholm, Sweden, in 1970.

== College career ==
Thornqvist attended the University of North Carolina in Chapel Hill, North Carolina, where he played for the North Carolina Tar Heels men's tennis team from 1990 to 1993. He was recognized as a three-time first-team All-Atlantic Coast Conference (ACC) selection in 1991, 1992 and 1993, and a first-team All-American in 1993. Thornqvist graduated from North Carolina with a bachelor's degree in economics in 1996.

== Coaching career ==
Thornqvist was the head coach of the Kansas Jayhawks women's tennis team at the University of Kansas in Lawrence, Kansas in 1997 and 1998. From 1999 to 2001, he was the head coach of the North Carolina Tar Heels women's tennis team at his alma mater, the University of North Carolina.

In 2002, Thornqvist became the head coach of the Florida Gators women's tennis program at the University of Florida in Gainesville, Florida. Since then, Thornqvist has been one of the top college tennis coaches in the country. His teams have qualified for the NCAA Tournament every year since he has been the head coach of the Gators. In 2003, 2011, 2012 and 2017, the Gators women's tennis team won the NCAA Division I National Championship. Thornqvist's Gators have also finished second in the NCAA tournament in 2002 and 2010.

The Intercollegiate Tennis Association (ITA) named Thornqvist as its national Coach of the Year in 2011.

Thornqvist retired from coaching Florida in 2024. In August 2025, he was named the head coach of the Wesleyan University men's tennis team.

== Coaching record ==
Record table
Season	Team	Overall	Conference	Standing	Postseason
Kansas Jayhawks (Big 12) (1997–1998)
1997	Kansas	15–14	10–3	2nd	NCAA Second Round
1998	Kansas	18–6	9–2	2nd	NCAA Round of 16
Kansas:		33–20	19–5		
UNC (Atlantic Coast Conference) (1999–2001)
1999	UNC	16–9	3–5	4th	NCAA Second Round
2000	UNC	10–14	2–6		NCAA First Round
2001	UNC	16–7	6–2		NCAA Second Round
UNC:		42–30	11–13		
Florida Gators (Southeastern Conference) (2002–2024)
2002	Florida	24–2	10–1	2nd	NCAA Runner-Up
2003	Florida	31–2	10–1	1st	NCAA Champions
2004	Florida	23–1	11–0	1st	NCAA Second Round
2005	Florida	22–3	9–2	T-2nd	NCAA Semifinals
2006	Florida	25–2	11–0	1st	NCAA Semifinals
2007	Florida	24–3	10–1	1st	NCAA Quarterfinals
2008	Florida	24–3	11–0	1st	NCAA Semifinals
2009	Florida	16–10	7–4	4th	NCAA Round of 16
2010	Florida	29–3	11–0	1st	NCAA Runner-Up
2011	Florida	31–1	11–0	1st	NCAA Champions
2012	Florida	27–1	11–0	1st	NCAA Champions
2013	Florida	26–3	12–1	T-1st	NCAA Semifinals
2014	Florida	23–6	11–2	T-2nd	NCAA Semifinals
2015	Florida	24–4	12–1	1st	NCAA Quarterfinals
2016	Florida	23–3	13–0	1st	NCAA Round of 16
2017	Florida	29–3	11–2	T-2nd	NCAA Champions
2018	Florida	19–9	11–2	T-2nd	NCAA Second Round
2019	Florida	13–12	7–6	T-6th	NCAA Second Round
2020	Florida	5–4	2–2	T-4th	Cancelled due to COVID-19
2021	Florida	13–8	10–3	2nd	NCAA Second Round
2022	Florida	21–7	10–3	T-3rd	NCAA Round of 16
2023	Florida	18–8	9–4	3rd	NCAA Round of 16
2024	Florida	17–9	11–2	4th	NCAA Second Round
Florida:		507–107	231–37		
Wesleyan Cardinals (NESCAC) (2025–present)
2025	Wesleyan	7–10	5–5	6th	
Wesleyan:		7–10	5–5		
Total:		589–167			
National champion Postseason invitational champion Conference regular season champion Conference regular season and conference tournament champion Division regular season champion Division regular season and conference tournament champion Conference tournament champion

== See also ==
- Bryan Shelton
- Florida Gators
- History of the University of Florida
- List of Florida Gators tennis players
- List of University of North Carolina alumni
- University Athletic Association
