= Dawn Buth =

American tennis player and coach

Current position
- Title: Director - Government Relations
- Team: NCAA

Biographical details
- Born: May 29, 1976 (age 50); Wichita, Kansas, U.S.
- Education: University of Florida

Playing career
- 1995–1998: Florida
- Positions: Singles, doubles

Coaching career (HC unless noted)
- 2003–2004: Penn (Assistant)
- 2004–2013: George Washington

Accomplishments and honors

Awards
- Atlantic 10 Coach of the Year (2010)

Dawn Alexis Buth (born May 29, 1976) is an American former college and professional tennis player. As a collegiate player, she played for the University of Florida and won two national doubles championships. As a professional, she played on the ITF Women's Circuit (ITF) and WTA Tour (WTA) from 1998 to 2001. She served as head coach of the women's tennis team at George Washington University (GWU) from 2004 to 2013. She is currently the Director for Government Relations at the National Collegiate Athletic Association (NCAA).

== Early years ==
Buth was born in Wichita, Kansas. She graduated from Wichita Southeast High School, where she played No. 1 singles and doubles for the Southeast Golden Buffaloes women's tennis team as a freshman, leading her team to state championship in 1991. She also ran the 4 × 100 meters relay, the 800 meters and the mile run for Southeast track team, and finished fifth in the mile at the high school state track and field championships.

In competition tennis, she won six national junior titles. She swept the 18-and-under singles and doubles crowns at the 1991 National Indoor Championships, and was ranked No. 8 nationally in the 18-and-under age group in 1993.

== College career ==
Buth accepted an athletic scholarship to attend the University of Florida in Gainesville, Florida, where she played for coach Andy Brandi's Florida Gators women's tennis team in National Collegiate Athletic Association (NCAA) competition from 1995 to 1998. She was ranked as the top college freshman in the country in 1995, and was a key member of the Gators' 1996 and 1998 NCAA national championship teams. With partner Stephanie Nickitas, Buth won consecutive NCAA doubles titles in 1996 and 1997, and she and Nickitas played for a third doubles title before losing in the final of the 1998 NCAA tournament. Buth and Nickitas were the first duo to win back-to-back NCAA doubles championships, and remain one of only two pairs to ever accomplish the feat. During her four-year college career, she was recognized as the NCAA Rookie of the Year, a four-time first-team All-Southeastern Conference (SEC) selection and a seven-time All-American.

She graduated from the university with a bachelor's degree in fine arts in 2002, and was inducted into the University of Florida Athletic Hall of Fame as a "Gator Great" in 2011.

== Professional career ==
Buth played professionally on the ITF Women's Circuit and Women's Tennis Association tour from 1998 to 2001. Her highest world rankings were No. 96 in singles, and No. 108 in doubles play. She earned twelve ITF doubles titles and two singles championships, and played in the main draw of all four Grand Slam tournaments. Her best Grand Slam performance was the second round of the women's singles tournament at the 2000 US Open.

== Coaching career ==
Buth started her coaching career as an assistant tennis professional at the Gainesville Country Club in Gainesville, Florida, from 2002 to 2003. From to 2003 to 2004, she worked as an assistant coach for the Penn Quakers women's tennis team at the University of Pennsylvania. She helped guide the Quakers to a 5–2 conference record in Ivy League competition, an overall record of 15–5, and a No. 28 national ranking—the best in Quakers' history.

In 2004–05, she became the head coach of the George Washington Colonials women's tennis team at George Washington University in Washington, D.C. During the 2009–10 season, Buth guided the GWU Colonials to a second-place finish in the Atlantic 10 Conference, their best performance in thirteen years. After the 2010 conference championships, she was named the Atlantic 10 Women's Tennis Coach of the Year. Her GWU Colonials were also awarded the NCAA Public Recognition Award for academic excellence at the start of the 2010–11 season.

In August 2013, Buth resigned as the head coach of the GWU Colonials women's tennis team to accept an administrative position with the NCAA, as the associate director for leadership development.

== See also ==
- Florida Gators
- List of Florida Gators tennis players
- List of University of Florida alumni
- List of University of Florida Athletic Hall of Fame members
