= 1988 Eckerd Open =

- Date: March 28 – April 3
- Edition: 16th
- Category: Category 3
- Draw: 32S / 16D
- Prize money: $200,000
- Surface: Clay
- Location: Tampa, Florida, U.S.

Champions

Singles
- (United States) Chris Evert

Doubles
- (United States) Terry Phelps / (Italy) Raffaella Reggi
← 1987 ·	Eckerd Open	· 1989 →

The 1988 Eckerd Open was a women's tennis tournament played on outdoor clay courts in Tampa, Florida in the United States and was part of the Category 3 tier of the 1988 WTA Tour. The tournament ran from March 28 through April 3, 1988. First-seeded Chris Evert won the singles title.

== Finals ==
=== Singles ===
(United States) Chris Evert defeated (Spain) Arantxa Sánchez 7–6^{(7–3)}, 6–4

- It was Evert's 1st singles title of the year and the 154th of her career.

=== Doubles ===
(United States) Terry Phelps / (Italy) Raffaella Reggi defeated (United States) Cammy MacGregor / (United States) Cynthia MacGregor 6–2, 6–4

- It was Phelps' only title of the year and the 1st of her career. It was Reggi's only title of the year and the 6th of her career.
