= Florida Gators women's tennis =

- University: University of Florida
- Head coach: Roland Thornqvist (10th season)
- Conference: SEC
- Location: Gainesville, Florida, US
- Home Court: Linder Stadium (Capacity: 1,000)
- Nickname: Florida Gators
- Colors: Orange and blue

NCAA Tournament championships
- 1992, 1996, 1998, 2003, 2011, 2012, 2017

NCAA Tournament runner-up
- 1988, 1990, 1995, 1997, 1999, 2002, 2010

NCAA Tournament appearances
- 1982, 1983, 1984, 1985, 1987, 1988, 1989, 1990, 1991, 1992, 1993, 1994, 1995, 1996, 1997, 1998, 1999, 2000, 2001, 2002, 2003, 2004, 2005, 2006, 2007, 2008, 2009, 2010, 2011, 2012, 2013, 2014, 2015, 2016, 2017

Conference Tournament championships
- 1982, 1990, 1991, 1992, 1993, 1995, 1996, 1997, 1998, 2000, 2002, 2003, 2004, 2005, 2006, 2010, 2011, 2012, 2013, 2016

Conference regular season champions
- 1980, 1981, 1982, 1984, 1985, 1986, 1987, 1988, 1990, 1991, 1992, 1993, 1995, 1996, 1997, 1998, 1999, 2001, 2003, 2004, 2006, 2007, 2008, 2010, 2011, 2012, 2013, 2015, 2016

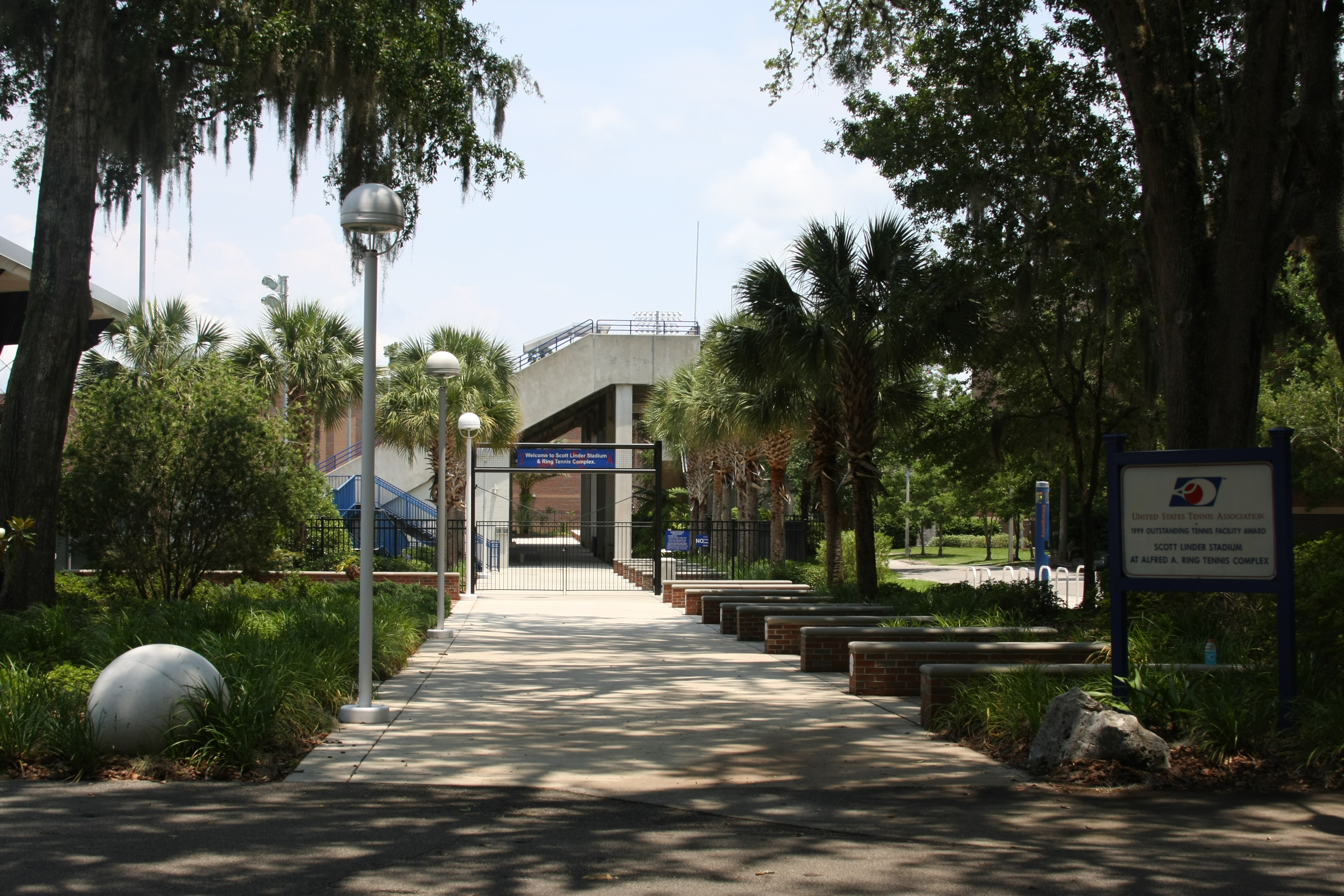
Linder Stadium at Ring Tennis Complex, location of the home courts of the Florida Gators women's tennis team.

The Florida Gators women's tennis team represents the University of Florida in the sport of tennis. The Gators compete in Division I of the National Collegiate Athletic Association (NCAA) and the Southeastern Conference (SEC). They play their home matches in Linder Stadium on the university's Gainesville, Florida, campus, and are currently led by head coach Roland Thornqvist. In the thirty-nine-year history of the Gators women's tennis program, the team has won twenty-five SEC championships and seven NCAA national tournament championships.

== History ==
The origins of the Florida Gators women's tennis team date to 1960, when Florida undergraduate Alice Tym organized and led a successful intercollegiate women's tennis club team. As Title IX expanded opportunities for women in college sports, the University of Florida sponsored its first intercollegiate varsity women's tennis team in 1972–1973. In the early years of the program, the Lady Gators were a perennial top-ten team in the national championship tournaments sponsored by the Association for Intercollegiate Athletics for Women (AIAW), including a second-place finish in the 1980 AIAW tournament.

Since the NCAA began sponsoring national championships in women's sports in 1981–1982, the Lady Gators have won five NCAA team championships, four NCAA singles championships, and four NCAA doubles championships. In addition to their five NCAA team championships, the Lady Gators have also finished second in the NCAA national championships tournament seven times, including 1988, 1990, 1995, 1997, 1999, 2002 and 2010. As a team, the Gators have failed to qualify for the AIAW and NCAA national championship tournaments only three times (1973, 1986 and 2009).

The Gators have also dominated the Southeastern Conference, winning twenty-five conference championships and seventeen SEC tournament titles since the SEC sanctioned women's tennis as a conference sport in 1980. In addition to the NCAA titles the Florida Gators have also won seven ITA National Championships (1988, 1991, 1992, 1996, 1997, 1999 and 2017).

=== Brandi era: 1985–2001 ===
Led by their fourth-year coach, Andy Brandi, the Florida Gators women's tennis team made its first appearance in the NCAA championship tournament finals in Los Angeles, California in 1988. The Lady Gators entered the tournament the top-seeded team, but were decisively upset by the Stanford Cardinal women's tennis team, five matches to two, in the final of the team championship. The Gators' No. 1 singles player, Shaun Stafford, was upset in the team championships, but recovered to win the individual NCAA singles championship by defeating her teammate Halle Cioffi in the championship final.

The Lady Gators hosted the NCAA national championship tournament on their home courts at Linder Stadium in Gainesville for the first time in 1990. Led by their top singles players, freshman Andrea Farley and junior Nicole Arendt, the second-seeded Gators battled to the championship finals before falling to the top-seeded Stanford Cardinal women, five matches to one.

The Gators won their first NCAA national team championship in Palo Alto, California, in 1992. Led by star freshman Lisa Raymond, the Gators beat the Texas Longhorns women's tennis team five matches to three. Raymond also won the individual 1992 NCAA championship in singles.

In 1995, for the fourth time in eight seasons, the Lady Gators reached the championship finals of the NCAA tournament, held in Malibu, California. After blazing through the first three rounds of the tournament without losing a single match, the Texas Longhorns edged the Gators in the finals, five matches to four, in one of the most evenly matched championship finals ever held.

In 1996, Brandi's top-ranked and undefeated Gators earned their second NCAA team championship in Tallahassee, Florida. Lady Gators Jill Craybas, Dawn Buth, Lisa Pugliese and Stephanie Nickitas won their singles matches, and Craybas and Lori Ann Freedman won the doubles match, as the team decisively defeated the Stanford Cardinal women five matches to two. The Lady Gators' previous record against the Cardinal in NCAA tournament play was 0–3. Craybas also claimed the individual 1996 NCAA singles championship, and Buth and Nickitas won the 1996 NCAA doubles title—only the second time in NCAA history that a women's team won the national team, singles and doubles titles in the same season. The Gators finished the season 31–0 in team matches, and defeated twenty college teams ranked among the top twenty-five in the country.

The top-seeded Gators reached the championship finals of the NCAA tournament for the third straight year in 1997, before falling to the Stanford Cardinal, five matches to one, in Palo Alto.

Brandi's undefeated Lady Gators claimed their third NCAA team championship in 1998 by crushing the Duke Blue Devils women's tennis team, five matches to one, in South Bend, Indiana. Led by seniors Bonnie Bleecker and Stephanie Nickitas, the second-seeded Gators won the doubles match and four of the five singles matches in the tournament final.

At the 1999 NCAA tournament held in Gaiensville, the top-seeded Gators women's tennis team returned to the championship finals for the fifth consecutive season, but lost to its national rival, the Stanford Cardinal, five matches to two, for the fourth time since 1988.

During Brandi's seventeen-year tenure, three individual Gators won four NCAA singles championships: Shaun Stafford in 1988; Lisa Raymond in 1992 and 1993; and Jill Craybas in 1996. In NCAA doubles championship play, three Gators doubles teams have won four NCAA doubles championships: Jillian Alexander and Nicole Arendt in 1991; Dawn Buth and Stephanie Nickitas in 1996 and 1997; and Whitney Laiho and Jessica Lehnhoff in 2001.

=== Thornqvist era: 2002 to present ===
In his first season the Lady Gators' new head coach, Roland Thornqvist returned the Gators to the finals of the 2002 NCAA championship tournament in Palo Alto, California. The top-seeded Gators faced the Stanford Cardinal women's tennis team for the second consecutive year in the NCAA tournament, and suffered the same fate: a 4–1 loss to the Cardinal.

The Gators won their fourth NCAA team championship in 2003, and their first under new head coach Roland Thornqvist, by defeating the top-ranked and defending NCAA champion Stanford Cardinal women's tennis team four matches to three in Gainesville. Gators Jennifer Magley and Zerene Reyes won the doubles match, with Julia Scaringe, Julie Rotondi and Alexis Gordon winning singles matches to clinch the 2003 team title. The Cardinal women had previously beaten the Gators to win the NCAA team championships in the two preceding seasons.

After failing to qualify for the NCAA tournament in 2009, and after a six-season absence from the NCAA tournament finals, the Gators returned to the championship match in Athens, Georgia 2010, once again facing their old nemesis, the Stanford Cardinal women. In a closely contested championship final, the Cardinal edged the Lady Gators, four matches to three. It was the Gators' seventh second-place performance in the NCAA championships (six of those championship losses at the hands of Stanford).

Thornqvist's Lady Gators claimed the program's fifth NCAA team championship in 2011 by defeating the No. 1 ranked Stanford Cardinal women's tennis team on Stanford's home courts in Palo Alto. Led by sophomore Lauren Embree in a dramatic come-from-behind third-set victory, the Gators defeated the Cardinal four matches to three, by taking the doubles match and singles matches by freshmen Alex Cercone and Olivia Janowicz. It was the third time the Gators defeated Stanford in the NCAA championship finals.

== Year-by-year results ==
Through the conclusion of the 2010–2011 season, the Lady Gators have compiled an overall win–loss record in dual matches of 875–128 (.872).

Season	Overall	SEC	National	SEC Season	SEC Tournament
1972-73	5-3	-	-	-	-
1973-74	8-2	-	14th AIAW	-	-
1974-75	6-3	-	7th AIAW	-	-
1975-76	5-5	-	11th AIAW	-	-
1976-77	16-2	-	5th AIAW	-	-
1977-78	12-3	-	4th AIAW	-	-
1978-79	9-4	-	6th AIAW	-	-
1979-80	15-3	2-0	2nd AIAW	1st	-
1980-81	11-17	2-0	4th AIAW	1st	-
1981-82	22-7	6-0	T-10th NCAA	1st	1st
1982-83	23-9	10-2	T-12th NCAA	2nd	2nd
1983-84	26-5	9-0	T-7th NCAA	1st	-
1984-85	21-6	9-0	T-7th NCAA	1st	-
1985-86	17-7	9-0	-	1st	-
1986-87	29-1	9-0	T-3rd NCAA	1st	-
1987-88	29-2	9-0	2nd NCAA	1st	-
1988-89	26-3	9-0	T-3rd NCAA	1st	-
1989-90	32-3	11-1	2nd NCAA	1st	1st
1990-91	31-1	12-0	T-3rd NCAA	1st	1st
1991-92	30-0	14-0	NCAA Champions	1st	1st
1992-93	26-2	14-0	T-3rd NCAA	1st	1st
1993-94	23-6	12-2	T-5th NCAA	2nd	2nd
1994-95	27-3	14-0	2nd NCAA	1st	1st
1995-96	31-0	14-0	NCAA Champions	1st	1st
1996-97	31-1	14-0	2nd NCAA	1st	1st
1997-98	27-0	14-0	NCAA Champions	1st	1st
1998-99	31-2	13-1	2nd NCAA	1st	2nd
1999–2000	25-3	10-1	T-3rd NCAA	2nd	1st
2000-01	24-3	11-0	T-3rd NCAA	1st	t-3rd
2001-02	24-2	10-1	2nd NCAA	2nd	1st
2002-03	31-2	10-1	NCAA Champions	1st	1st
2003-04	23-1	11-0	T-32nd NCAA	1st	1st
2004-05	22-3	9-2	T-3rd NCAA	t-2nd	1st
2005-06	25-2	11-0	T-3rd NCAA	1st	1st
2006-07	24-3	10-1	T-5th NCAA	1st	2nd
2007-08	24-3	11-0	T-3rd NCAA	1st	2nd
2008-09	16-10	7-4	-	4th	-
2009-10	29-3	11-0	2nd NCAA	1st	1st
2010-11	31-1	11-0	NCAA Champions	1st	1st
2011-12	27-1	11-0	NCAA Champions	1st	1st

== All-Americans ==
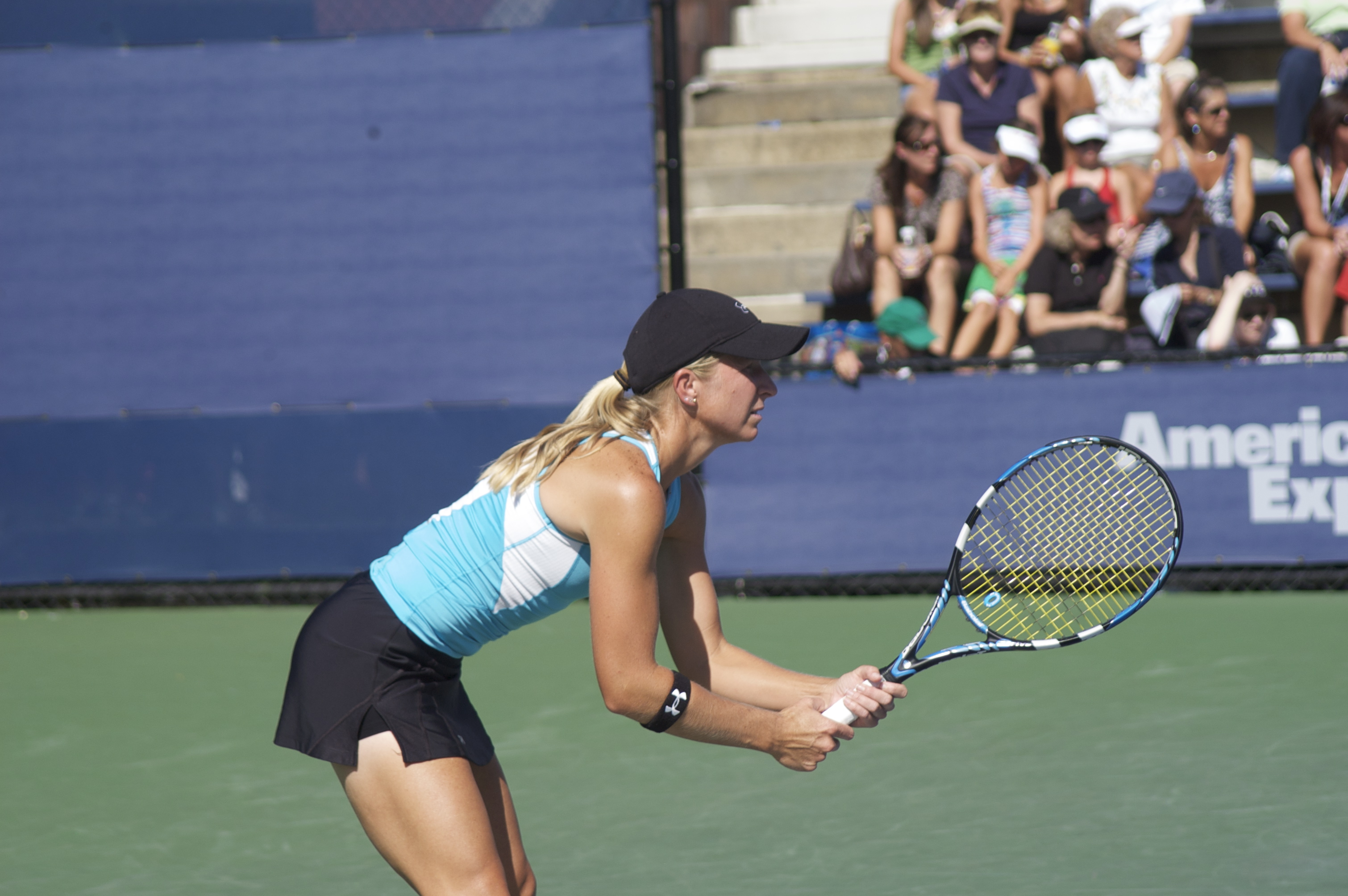
Jill Craybas

Fifty-eight members of the Florida Gators women's tennis team have earned 140 All-American honors.

- Judy Acker – Singles (1976)
- Sherry Acker – Singles (1977, 1978)
- Jillian Alexander – Singles (1990, 1991), Doubles (1991)
- Megan Alexander – Singles (2007)
- Nicole Arendt – Singles (1998, 1989, 1990, 1991) Doubles (1988, 1989, 1990, 1991)
- Brooke Austin – Singles (2015, 2016), Doubles (2015, 2016, 2017)
- Amanda Basica – Singles (1997)
- Whitney Benik – Doubles (2005)
- Marrit Boonstra - Singles (2009), Doubles (2008, 2010)
- Csilla Borsanyi – Singles (2007)
- Jill Brenner – Singles (1993)
- Dawn Buth – Singles (1995, 1996, 1997, 1998), Doubles (1996, 1997, 1998)
- Alexandra Cercone – Doubles (2010)
- Halle Cioffi – Singles (1988)
- Kim Clingan – Singles (1984)
- Jill Craybas – 1995 Singles (1995, 1996)
- Holly Danforth – Singles (1988, 1990)
- Anna Danilina - Singles (2018), Doubles (2017, 2018)
- Lindsay Dawaf – Singles (2002), Doubles (2002)
- Cissie Donigan – Singles (1981)
- Ingelise Driehuis – Singles (1989)

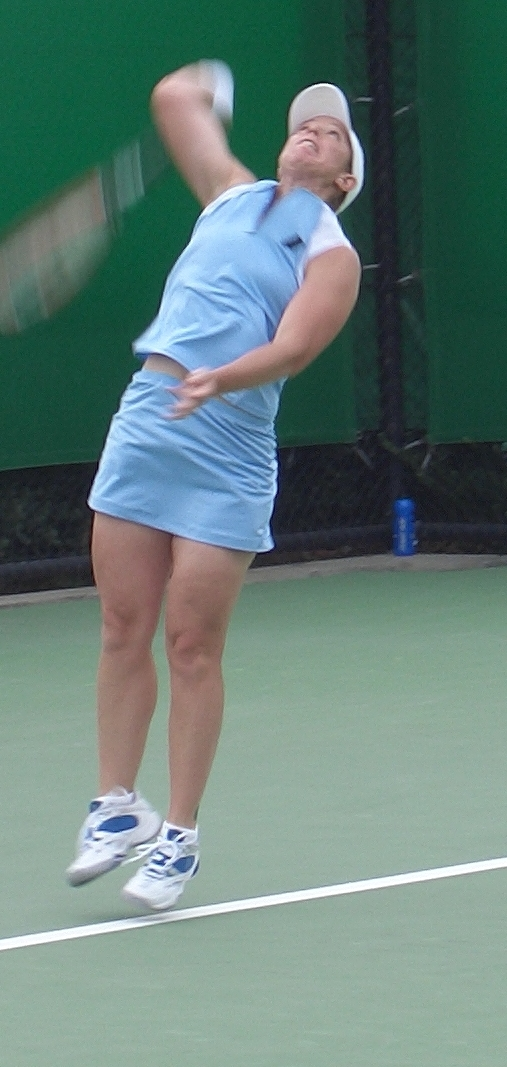
Lisa Raymond

- Lauren Embree – Singles (2010, 2011, 2012, 2013), Doubles (2012)
- Andrea Farley – Singles (1990, 1991, 1993)
- Lolita Frangulyan – Doubles (2005)
- Cathy Goodrich – Singles (1987, 1988, 1989, 1990)
- Alexis Gordon – Singles (2003, 2004, 2006), Doubles (2004)
- Stephanie Hazlett – Singles (1999, 2000)
- Jill Hetherington – Singles (1984, 1985, 1986, 1987)
- Kathy Holton – Singles (1983)
- Ida Jarlksog - Singles (2019)
- Olivia Janowicz – Singles (2014)
- Josie Kuhlman - Singles (2015)
- McCartney Kessler - Singles (2021), Doubles (2021)
- Kourtney Keegan – Singles (2015), Doubles (2016, 2017)
- Whitney Laiho – Singles (1999, 2000, 2001) Singles, Doubles (2000, 2001)
- Jessica Lehnhoff – Doubles (1999, 2000, 2001, 2002), Singles (2000, 2001, 2002)
- Holly Lloyd – Singles (1992)
- Jennifer Magley – Doubles (2003, 2005), Singles (2004, 2005)
- Jan Martin – Singles (1985, 1986)
- Joanna Mather – Doubles (2012)
- Divya Merchant – Singles (1996, 1997)
- Brianna Morgan – Singles (2014)
- Ingrid Neel - Doubles (2017)
- Siobhán Nicholson – Singles (1988, 1989)
- Stephanie Nickitas – Doubles (1996, 1997, 1998, 1999), Singles (1998, 1999)
- Sofie Oyen – Singles (2013), Doubles (2012)
- Joyce Portman – Singles (1979, 1980)
- Julie Pressly – Singles (1978, 1980)
- Lisa Raymond – Singles (1992, 1993)
- Zerene Reyes – Doubles (2003, 2005), Singles (2005)
- Julie Rotondi – Doubles (2004)
- Diana Srebrovic – Singles (2006, 2007)
- Shaun Stafford – Singles (1987, 1988)
- M.C. White – Singles (1997)
- Tammy Whittington – Singles (1985, 1987)
- Allie Will – Singles (2010, 2011, 2012), Doubles (2010, 2011, 2012)
- Belinda Woolcock – Singles (2016, 2017)
- Marlee Zein – Doubles (2021)

== See also ==
- Florida Gators
- Florida Gators men's tennis
- List of Florida Gators tennis players
- List of University of Florida Athletic Hall of Fame members
- List of University of Florida Olympians
- University Athletic Association
