= Jill Craybas =

American tennis player (born 1974)

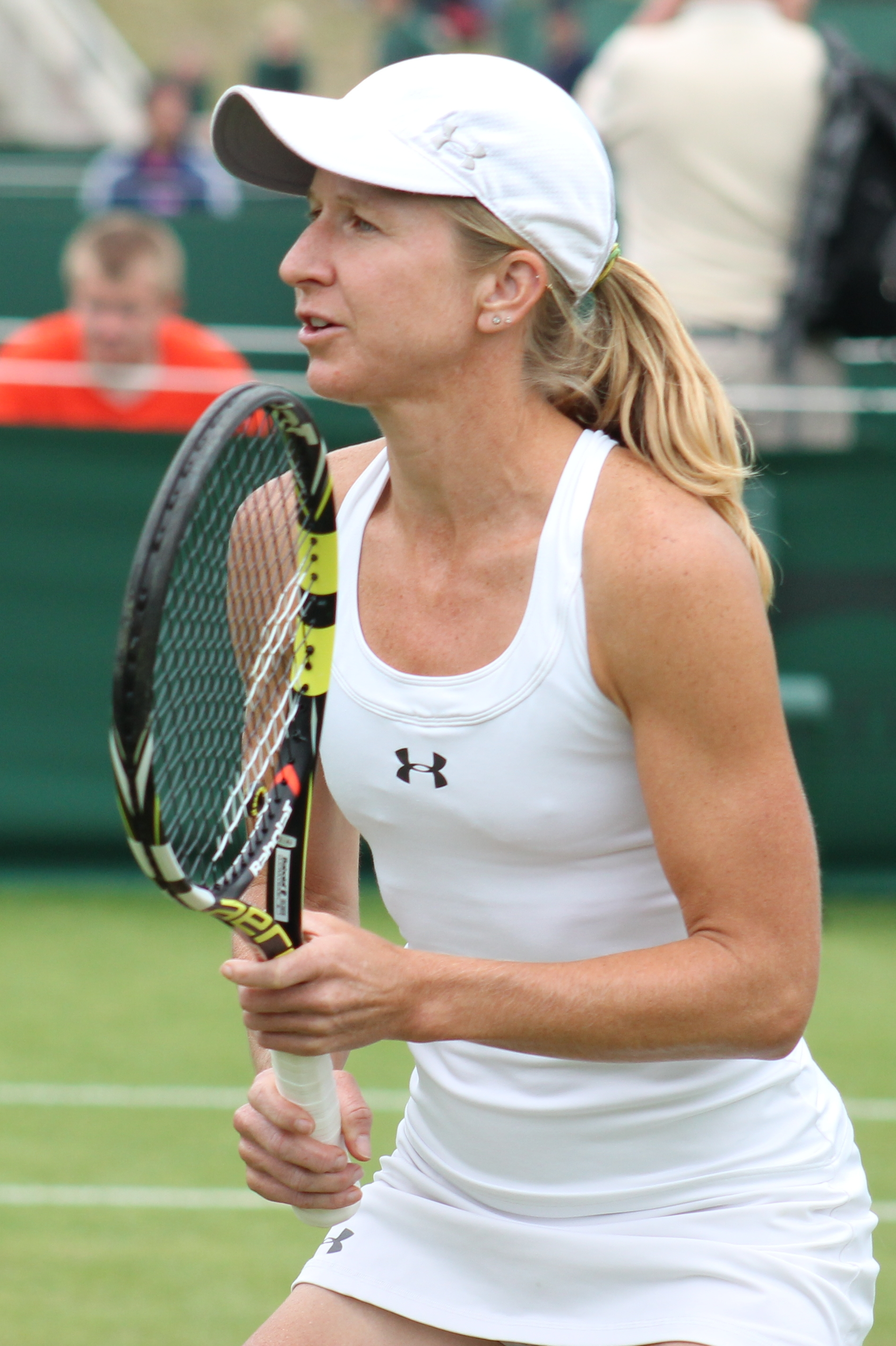
- Craybas at Wimbledon, 2013
- Country (sports): United States
- Residence: Huntington Beach, California
- Born: July 4, 1974 (age 51) Providence, Rhode Island
- Height: 1.60 m (5 ft 3 in)
- Turned pro: 1996
- Retired: 2013
- Plays: Right-handed (two-handed backhand)
- College: University of Florida
- Prize money: US$ 2,552,154

Singles
- Career record: 434–452
- Career titles: 1 WTA, 4 ITF
- Highest ranking: No. 39 (April 17, 2006)

Grand Slam singles results
- Australian Open: 3R (2004)
- French Open: 2R (2001, 2007, 2009, 2010, 2011)
- Wimbledon: 4R (2005)
- US Open: 2R (2004, 2005, 2006, 2009)

Other tournaments
- Olympic Games: 1R (2008)

Doubles
- Career record: 163–244
- Career titles: 5 WTA, 1 ITF
- Highest ranking: No. 41 (June 23, 2008)

Grand Slam doubles results
- Australian Open: 2R (2006, 2007, 2011)
- French Open: QF (2004)
- Wimbledon: 3R (2007)
- US Open: 2R (2004, 2005, 2006, 2012)

Mixed doubles
- Career record: 9–10
- Career titles: 0

Grand Slam mixed doubles results
- Wimbledon: 2R (2006, 2008)
- US Open: SF (2008)

Team competitions
- Fed Cup: 3–5

Jill N. Craybas (born July 4, 1974) is an American former professional tennis player.

From the 2000 US Open to the 2011 US Open, Craybas competed in 45 consecutive Grand Slam tournament main draws; her best result coming in the 2005 Wimbledon Championships where she reached the fourth round, which included wins over Marion Bartoli and Serena Williams. By the time she retired in 2013, she was one of the oldest players on the WTA Tour at 39 years of age, as well as the longest serving, having turned pro in 1996.

== Early years ==
Craybas was born in Providence, Rhode Island. During commenting the 2024 Mutua Madrid Open women's singles final, she said she is of Polish descent. She received an athletic scholarship to attend the University of Florida in Gainesville, Florida, where she played for coach Andy Brandi's Florida Gators women's tennis team in National Collegiate Athletic Association (NCAA) and Southeastern Conference (SEC) competition from 1993 to 1996. As a senior, she won the 1996 NCAA women's singles tennis championship. She was the 1995–96 recipient of the Honda Sports Award for Tennis, recognizing her as the outstanding collegiate female tennis player of the year.

Craybas graduated from the University of Florida with a bachelor's degree in telecommunications in 1996, and has said in interviews that she hopes to enter film or television production when her playing career ends. She was inducted into the University of Florida Athletic Hall of Fame as a "Gator Great" in 2008.

Craybas credits her achievements to her long-time coach, Raja Chaudhuri who has worked with her from the start of her tennis career.

== Professional career ==
Craybas turned professional in 1996. She won one title on the WTA Tour, at the Japan Open. She beat Silvija Talaja in the final, after trailing 4–0 in the third set. In the 2006 season, Craybas reached one quarterfinal at Hobart as the eighth seed, losing to unseeded Italian Mara Santangelo in three sets. She also reached the semifinals of a Tier-III event in Memphis, a fourth-round showing at the Tier-I event in Key Biscayne, Florida and a further quarterfinal appearance at Stanford in late July.

Craybas is best known for her 2005 defeat of Serena Williams in the third round of Wimbledon. She beat Williams 6–3, 7–6, then lost to Serena's older sister, and eventual champion, Venus Williams 0–6, 2–6.

On March 25, 2006, Craybas once again served up an early round defeat of a top-seeded player. This time it was second-seeded Kim Clijsters in the second round of the Key Biscayne WTA Tour tournament. After having led in both the first and third sets, Clijsters eventually lost by a score of 5–7, 6–3, 5–7. It was Clijsters earliest ever exit in Key Biscayne, and she was the defending champion.

By that time Craybas, then a veteran on the tour, was thought to be playing the best tennis of her life. However, after having a successful start to 2006, she fell short of what was expected of her from her dramatically impressive start, losing to lower-ranked opponents in first rounds or having difficult first round draws against the top players in the world.

She began 2007 by reaching the semifinals of a Tier-IV event in New Zealand, the Auckland Open. She beat all of her opponents in straight sets before bowing out to Vera Zvonareva, 3–6, 5–7. She next took part in the Tier-II event in Sydney, where she lost in the last round of qualifying to Vera Dushevina, 1–6, 6–3, 1–6. At the first Grand Slam tournament of the year at the Australian Open, she suffered a first-round loss to the tenth-seeded Nicole Vaidišová. Craybas bounced back into winning form at her next tournament in the U.S., at an ITF tournament in Midland, Michigan. As the top-seeded, she beat all of her opponents in straight sets until a hard-fought 2–6, 6–3, 6–3 victory over second-seeded and fellow American Laura Granville. Because of her lower ranking, she suffered in tough draws, not going further than the second round of any tournament since.

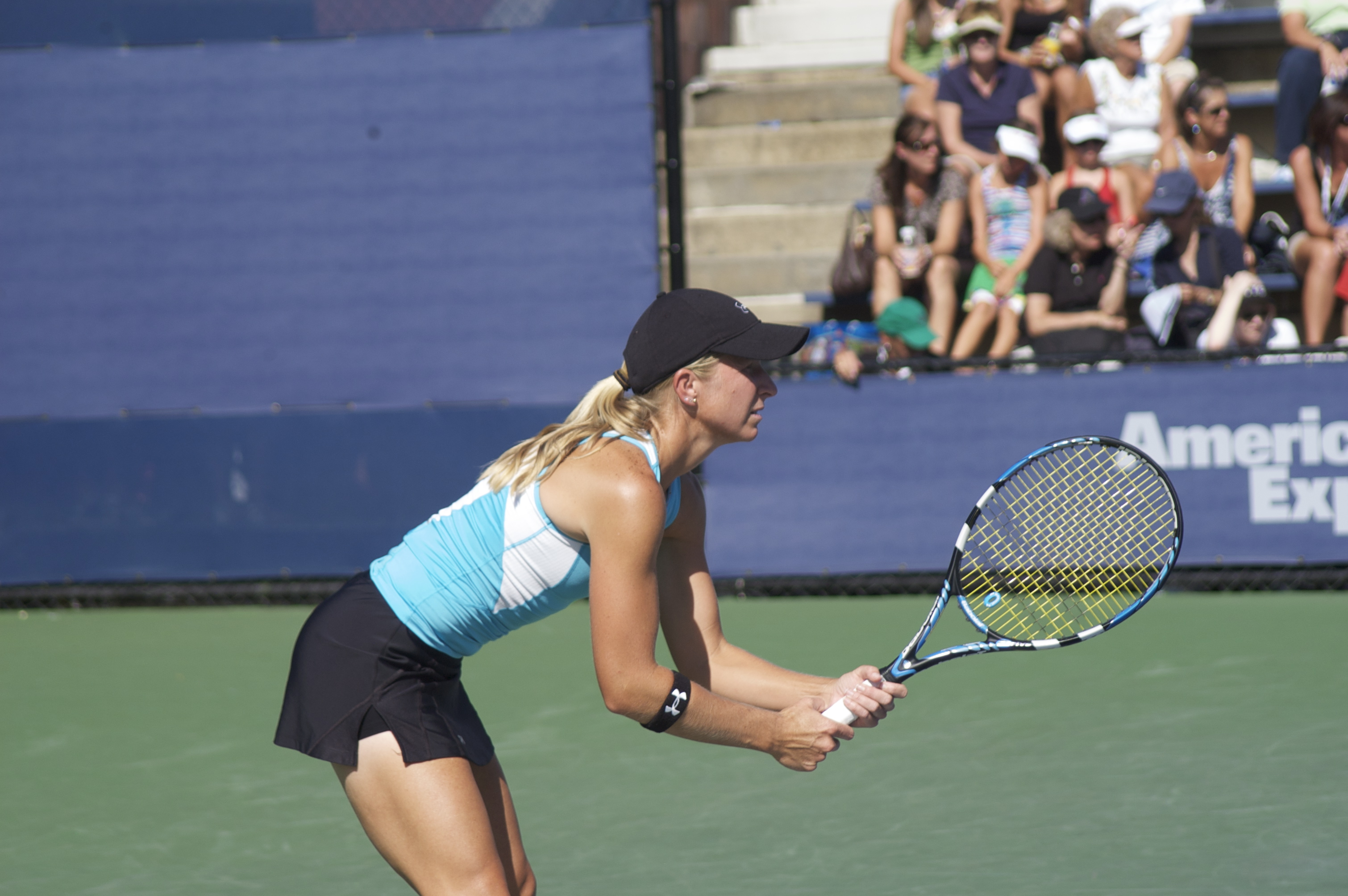
Jill Craybas at the 2008 US Open

At the start of 2008, Craybas entered the Pattaya Open, where, as the seventh seed, she played some of the best tennis of her career and beat Olga Savchuk 6–1, 6–1 in the first round, Renata Voráčová 2–6, 6–1, 6–3 in the second, and Andreja Klepač 6–4, 6–4 in the quarterfinals. In the semifinals, she beat Akgul Amanmuradova 6–4, 6–0, and lost to the top seed Agnieszka Radwańska in a tie-break in the third set. As a result, Craybas's ranking improved from world No. 77 to No. 60.

Craybas won the 2008 Istanbul Cup in doubles.

She represented the United States at the 2008 Summer Olympics in the women's singles tournament. She became the last qualifier for the event, replacing Tamira Paszek of Austria. The opening came available when fellow American Ashley Harkleroad elected to skip the games after she became pregnant. At the US Open 2013, Craybas announced her retirement from tennis.

== WTA Tour finals ==
=== Singles: 2 (1 title, 1 runner-up) ===
Legend
Grand Slam tournaments
Tier I
Tier II
Tier III, IV & V (1–1)

| Result | W–L | Date | Tournament | Surface | Opponent | Score |
|---|---|---|---|---|---|---|
| Win | 1–0 | Oct 2002 | Japan Open | Hard | (Croatia) Silvija Talaja | 2–6, 6–4, 6–4 |
| Loss | 1–1 | Feb 2008 | Pattaya Open, Thailand | Hard | (Poland) Agnieszka Radwańska | 2–6, 6–1, 6–7^{(4–7)} |

=== Doubles: 14 (5 titles, 9 runner-ups) ===
Legend
Grand Slam tournaments
Tier I / Premier M & Premier 5
Tier II / Premier
Tier III, IV & V / International (5–9)

| Result | W–L | Date | Tournament | Surface | Partner | Opponents | Score |
|---|---|---|---|---|---|---|---|
| Win | 1–0 | May 2003 | Madrid Open, Spain | Clay | (South Africa) Liezel Huber | (Italy) Rita Grande (Indonesia) Angelique Widjaja | 6–4, 7–6^{(8–6)} |
| Win | 2–0 | Aug 2004 | Cincinnati Open, United States | Hard | (Germany) Marlene Weingärtner | (Switzerland) Emmanuelle Gagliardi (Germany) Anna-Lena Grönefeld | 7–5, 7–6^{(7–2)} |
| Loss | 2–1 | Oct 2004 | Luxembourg Open | Hard | (Germany) Marlene Weingärtner | (Spain) Virginia Ruano Pascual (Argentina) Paola Suárez | 1–6, 7–6^{(7–1)}, 3–6 |
| Loss | 2–2 | Sep 2005 | Korea Open | Hard | (South Africa) Natalie Grandin | (Chinese Taipei) Chan Yung-jan (Chinese Taipei) Chuang Chia-jung | 2–6, 4–6 |
| Loss | 2–3 | Jan 2006 | Hobart International, Australia | Hard | (Croatia) Jelena Kostanić | (France) Émilie Loit (Australia) Nicole Pratt | 2–6, 1–6 |
| Loss | 2–4 | Jun 2006 | Birmingham Classic, UK | Grass | (South Africa) Liezel Huber | (Serbia) Jelena Janković (China) Li Na | 2–6, 4–6 |
| Loss | 2–5 | Oct 2006 | Tournoi de Québec, Canada | Hard | (Russia) Alina Jidkova | (United States) Carly Gullickson (United States) Laura Granville | 3–6, 4–6 |
| Loss | 2–6 | Sep 2007 | Bali Classic, Indonesia | Hard | (South Africa) Natalie Grandin | (China) Ji Chunmei (China) Sun Shengnan | 3–6, 2–6 |
| Loss | 2–7 | Apr 2008 | Prague Open, Czech Republic | Clay | (Netherlands) Michaëlla Krajicek | (Czech Republic) Andrea Hlaváčková (Czech Republic) Lucie Hradecká | 6–1, 3–6, [6–10] |
| Win | 3–7 | May 2008 | Istanbul Cup, Turkey | Clay | (Belarus) Olga Govortsova | (New Zealand) Marina Erakovic (Slovenia) Polona Hercog | 6–1, 6–2 |
| Win | 4–7 | Oct 2008 | Japan Open | Hard | (New Zealand) Marina Erakovic | (Japan) Ayumi Morita (Japan) Aiko Nakamura | 4–6, 7–5, [10–6] |
| Loss | 4–8 | Nov 2008 | Tournoi de Québec, Canada | Hard | (Thailand) Tamarine Tanasugarn | (Germany) Anna-Lena Grönefeld (United States) Vania King | 6–7^{(3–7)}, 4–6 |
| Loss | 4–9 | Jul 2010 | Palermo Ladies Open, Italy | Clay | (Germany) Julia Görges | (Italy) Alberta Brianti (Italy) Sara Errani | 4–6, 1–6 |
| Win | 5–9 | Jun 2012 | Gastein Ladies, Austria | Clay | (Germany) Julia Görges | (Germany) Anna-Lena Grönefeld (Croatia) Petra Martić | 6–7^{(4–7)}, 6–4, [11–9] |

=== Mixed doubles: 1 (runner-up) ===
| Result | Date | Tournament | Tier | Surface | Partner | Opponents | Score |
|---|---|---|---|---|---|---|---|
| Loss | Sep 2004 | China Open | Tier II | Hard | (United States) Justin Gimelstob | (Switzerland) Emmanuelle Gagliardi (United States) Tripp Phillips | 1–6, 2–6 |

== Grand Slam performance timelines ==
Key
| W | F | SF | QF | #R | RR | Q# | DNQ | A | NH |

(W) winner; (F) finalist; (SF) semifinalist; (QF) quarterfinalist; (#R) rounds 4, 3, 2, 1; (RR) round-robin stage; (Q#) qualification round; (DNQ) did not qualify; (A) absent; (NH) not held; (SR) strike rate (events won / competed); (W–L) win–loss record.

=== Singles ===
| Tournament | 1996 | 1997 | 1998 | 1999 | 2000 | 2001 | 2002 | 2003 | 2004 | 2005 | 2006 | 2007 | 2008 | 2009 | 2010 | 2011 | 2012 | 2013 | W–L |
|---|---|---|---|---|---|---|---|---|---|---|---|---|---|---|---|---|---|---|---|
| Australian Open | A | A | A | 1R | Q1 | 1R | 2R | 1R | 3R | 1R | 1R | 1R | 2R | 1R | 1R | 2R | Q2 | Q1 | 5–12 |
| French Open | A | A | A | Q1 | A | 2R | 1R | 1R | 1R | 1R | 1R | 2R | 1R | 2R | 2R | 2R | Q2 | A | 5–11 |
| Wimbledon | A | A | A | Q1 | Q1 | 1R | 2R | 1R | 2R | 4R | 1R | 1R | 1R | 2R | 1R | 1R | Q1 | A | 6–11 |
| US Open | 1R | A | 1R | 1R | 1R | 1R | 1R | 1R | 2R | 2R | 2R | 1R | 1R | 2R | 1R | 1R | Q1 | A | 4–15 |
| Win–loss | 0–1 | 0–0 | 0–1 | 0–2 | 0–1 | 1–4 | 2–4 | 0–4 | 4–4 | 4–4 | 1–4 | 1–4 | 1–4 | 3–4 | 1–4 | 2–4 | 0–0 | 0–0 | 20–49 |

=== Doubles ===
| Tournament | 1998 | 2003 | 2004 | 2005 | 2006 | 2007 | 2008 | 2009 | 2010 | 2011 | 2012 | 2013 | W–L |
|---|---|---|---|---|---|---|---|---|---|---|---|---|---|
| Australian Open | A | A | 1R | 1R | 2R | 2R | 1R | 1R | 1R | 2R | 2R | 2R | 5–10 |
| French Open | A | A | QF | 1R | 1R | 1R | 1R | 2R | 1R | 1R | A | 1R | 4–9 |
| Wimbledon | A | 2R | 1R | 1R | 1R | 3R | 1R | 1R | 1R | 1R | 1R | A | 3–10 |
| US Open | 1R | 1R | 2R | 2R | 2R | 1R | 1R | 1R | 1R | A | 2R | 2R | 5–11 |
| Win–loss | 0–1 | 1–2 | 4–4 | 1–4 | 2–4 | 3–4 | 0–4 | 1–4 | 0–4 | 1–3 | 2–3 | 2–3 | 17–40 |

== See also ==
- Florida Gators
- List of Florida Gators tennis players
- List of University of Florida alumni
- List of University of Florida Olympians
- List of University of Florida Athletic Hall of Fame members
