= 1989 Eckerd Open – Singles =

Singles
- 1989 Eckerd Open
- 1988 Champion: (United States) Chris Evert

Final
- Champion: (Spain) Conchita Martínez
- Runner-up: (Argentina) Gabriela Sabatini
- Score: 6–3, 6–2

Details
- Draw: 32
- Seeds: 8

Events
Singles	Doubles
- Eckerd Open

Chris Evert was the defending champion but did not compete that year.

Conchita Martínez beat Gabriela Sabatini in the final by a score of 6–3, 6–2. It was Martinez' second title of the season and the third of her career. The match was Sabatini's third final of the year, and it marked the first time she had been beaten by Martinez.

== Seeds ==
A champion seed is indicated in bold text, and text in italics indicates the round in which this seed was eliminated.

1. (Argentina) Gabriela Sabatini (final)
2. (Soviet Union) Natasha Zvereva (second round)
3. (Bulgaria) Katerina Maleeva (first round)
4. (Spain) Arantxa Sánchez (semifinals)
5. (Soviet Union) Larisa Savchenko (first round)
6. (Italy) Sandra Cecchini (quarterfinals)
7. (United States) Susan Sloane (second round)
8. (Spain) **Conchita Martínez (champion)**

== Draw ==
Key

- Q = Qualifier
- WC = Wild card
- LL = Lucky loser
- Alt = Alternate
- ITF = ITF entry
- PR = Protected ranking
- SR = Special ranking
- SE = Special exempt
- JE = Junior exempt
- JR = Junior Accelerator Programme entrant
- CO = College Accelerator Programme entrant
- NG = Next Gen Accelerator Program entrant
- w/o = Walkover
- r = Retired
- d = Defaulted

First round
1	(Argentina) **Gabriela Sabatini**	**7**	**6**
(Argentina) Bettina Fulco	5	2
(Netherlands) Brenda Schultz-McCarthy	**6**	3	4
(West Germany) **Isabel Cueto**	4	**6**	**6**
(Czechoslovakia) Jana Pospíšilová	2	1
(Italy) **Linda Ferrando**	**6**	**6**
(United States) Ann Grossman	5	1
7	(United States) **Susan Sloane**	**7**	**6**
4	(Spain) **Arantxa Sánchez Vicario**	**6**	**6**
(United States) Mary Lou Piatek	1	2
Q	(Argentina) Adriana Villagrán	2	1
Q	(United States) **Ronni Reis**	**6**	**6**
Q	(United States) **Shaun Stafford**	**6**	**7**
LL	(Czechoslovakia) Andrea Holíková	3	5
(South Africa) **Rosalyn Fairbank**	**7**	**6**
5	(Soviet Union) Larisa Neiland	6	3
8	(Spain) **Conchita Martínez**	**6**	**6**
(Greece) Angeliki Kanellopoulou	2	2
(Peru) **Laura Arraya**	**6**	**6**
(Soviet Union) Leila Meskhi	4	4
(United States) **Halle Cioffi**	**6**	**6**
(United States) Tracy Austin	4	3
(United States) **Donna Faber**	**6**	1	**6**
3	(Bulgaria) Katerina Maleeva	3	**6**	3
6	(Italy) **Sandra Cecchini**	5	**7**	**6**
(Argentina) Patricia Tarabini	**7**	5	1
LL	(Brazil) **Andrea Vieira**	6	**7**	**6**
(United States) Wendy White	**7**	5	1
Q	(Czechoslovakia) **Petra Langrová**	**6**	**6**
(United States) Kathleen Horvath	2	3
(United States) Kate Gompert	3	2
2	(Soviet Union) **Natasha Zvereva**	**6**	**6**

Second round
1	(Argentina) **Gabriela Sabatini**	**6**	**6**
(West Germany) Isabel Cueto	1	1
(Italy) **Linda Ferrando**	**6**	4	**7**
7	(United States) Susan Sloane	2	**6**	5
4	(Spain) **Arantxa Sánchez Vicario**	**6**	**6**
Q	(United States) Ronni Reis	3	1
Q	(United States) Shaun Stafford	1	**7**	2
(South Africa) **Rosalyn Fairbank**	**6**	5	**6**
8	(Spain) **Conchita Martínez**	**6**	**6**
(Peru) Laura Arraya	3	0
(United States) **Halle Cioffi**	1	**6**	**6**
(United States) Donna Faber	**6**	4	2
6	(Italy) **Sandra Cecchini**	**6**	**6**
LL	(Brazil) Andrea Vieira	2	4
Q	(Czechoslovakia) **Petra Langrová**	**6**	**6**
2	(Soviet Union) Natasha Zvereva	4	1

Quarterfinals
1	(Argentina) **Gabriela Sabatini**	**6**	**6**
(Italy) Linda Ferrando	2	3
4	(Spain) **Arantxa Sánchez Vicario**	**6**	**6**
(South Africa) Rosalyn Fairbank	1	0
8	(Spain) **Conchita Martínez**	**6**	**6**
(United States) Halle Cioffi	1	2
6	(Italy) **Sandra Cecchini**	**6**	**6**
Q	(Czechoslovakia) Petra Langrová	2	2

Semifinals
1	(Argentina) **Gabriela Sabatini**	**6**	**6**
4	(Spain) Arantxa Sánchez Vicario	4	4
8	(Spain) **Conchita Martínez**	**6**	**6**
6	(Italy) Sandra Cecchini	0	0

Final
1	(Argentina) Gabriela Sabatini	3	2
8	(Spain) **Conchita Martínez**	**6**	**6**
