= 1989 Eckerd Open =

- Date: April 17–23
- Edition: 17th
- Category: Category 3
- Draw: 32S / 16D
- Prize money: $200,000
- Surface: Clay / outdoor
- Location: Tampa, Florida, U.S.

Champions

Singles
- (Spain) Conchita Martínez

Doubles
- (Netherlands) Brenda Schultz / (Hungary) Andrea Temesvári
← 1988 ·	Eckerd Open	· 1990 →

The 1989 Eckerd Open was a women's tennis tournament played on outdoor clay courts in Tampa, Florida in the United States that was part of the Category 3 tier of the 1989 WTA Tour. It was the 17th edition of the tournament and was held from April 17 through April 23, 1989. Eighth-seeded Conchita Martínez won the singles title and earned $40,000 first-prize money.

== Finals ==
=== Singles ===
(Spain) Conchita Martínez defeated (Argentina) Gabriela Sabatini 6–3, 6–2

- It was Martínez's 2nd title of the year and the 3rd of her career.

=== Doubles ===
(Netherlands) Brenda Schultz / (Hungary) Andrea Temesvári defeated (United States) Elise Burgin / (South Africa) Rosalyn Fairbank 7–6^{(8–6)}, 6–4

- It was Schultz's only title of the year and the 1st of her career. It was Temesvári's only title of the year and the 9th of her career.
