= Florida Gators men's tennis =

Men's tennis team of the University of Florida

- University: University of Florida
- Athletic director: Scott Stricklin
- Conference: SEC
- Location: Gainesville, FL
- Home Court: Linder Stadium (Capacity: 1,000)
- Nickname: Florida Gators
- Colors: Orange and blue

NCAA Tournament championships
- 2021

NCAA Tournament appearances
- 1991, 1992, 1993, 1994, 1995, 1997, 1998, 1999, 2000, 2001, 2002, 2003, 2004, 2005, 2006, 2007, 2008, 2009, 2010, 2011, 2012, 2013, 2014, 2015, 2016, 2017, 2018, 2019, 2021, 2022

Conference Tournament championships
- 1994, 2000, 2005, 2011, 2016, 2022

Conference regular season champions
- 1950, 1961, 1968, 1969, 1975, 1994, 2000, 2003, 2005, 2019, 2021, 2022

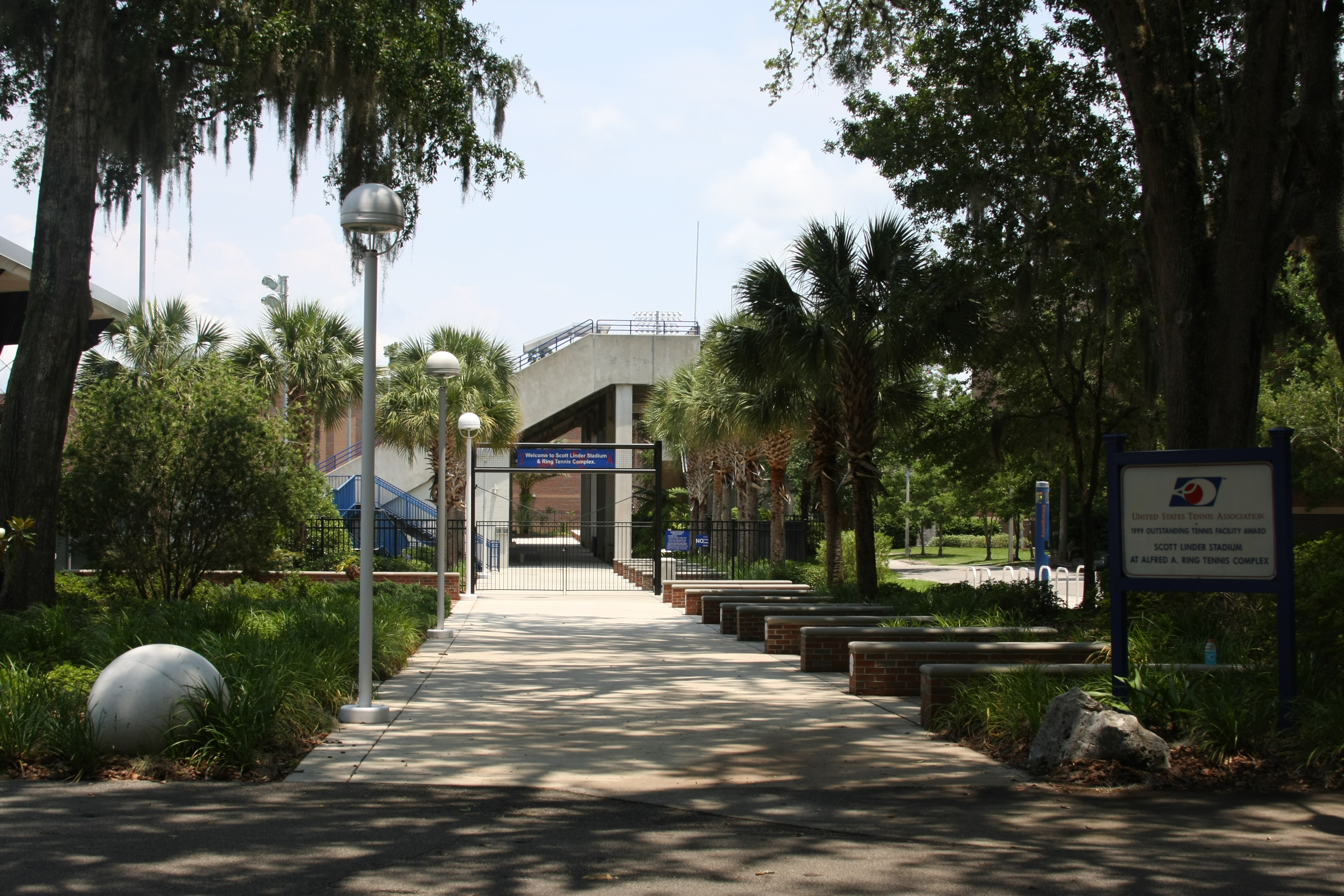
Linder Stadium at Ring Tennis Complex, location of the home courts of the Florida Gators men's tennis team.

The Florida Gators men's tennis team represents the University of Florida in the sport of tennis. The Gators compete in Division I of the National Collegiate Athletic Association (NCAA) and the Southeastern Conference (SEC). The team hosts its home matches in Linder Stadium on the university's Gainesville, Florida campus.

Florida's men tennis program has consistently been one of the most successful in college tennis for the past several decades. Since the university's men's tennis program was established in 1932, Florida has won three NCAA singles championships, one NCAA doubles championship, eighteen SEC regular season and tournament titles, and one national team championship.

== Team history ==
The Florida Gators men's tennis team was established in 1932 under head coach Dennis K. "Dutch" Stanley. In eight years leading the Gators' tennis program, Stanley compiled a team win–loss record of 54–12 (.818), still the best coaching record in the history of the program as measured by winning percentage. Stanley, who also served as the head coach of Florida's football and track teams, left the university in 1940, but later returned as the first dean of its College of Health and Human Performance.

Florida's men's tennis program became the second at the school to win a Southeastern Conference championship (after men's swimming) upon winning the SEC tournament title in 1950. Overall, the program has earned twelve SEC team tournament championships (1950, 1961, 1968, 1969, 1975, 1994, 2000, 2003, 2005, 2019, 2021, 2022) along with twelve regular season conference crowns. Since there was no tournament held in 2020 due to the COVID-19 pandemic, the Gators enter the 2022–2023 season as the three-time defending SEC champions after compiling a 40–1 regular season conference record over that timeframe.

Florida's men tennis program has been one of the nation's top college programs for several decades and have been invited to the NCAA men's tennis championship tournament every year save one (1996) since 1991 and are consistently ranked in the top-10. The Gators advanced to the NCAA tournament quarterfinals on numerous occasions and have an all-time record of 64–29 in NCAA tournament dual matches. They won their first team national championship in 2021.

In individual match play, Gators Mark Merklein and David Blair claimed the NCAA doubles championships in 1993. Merklein won the NCAA singles championship in 1994, losing just one set while defeating six tournament opponents. Gator Jeff Morrison claimed the NCAA singles championship in 1999, also losing only a single set on the way to the title. Sam Riffice won the NCAA singles championship in 2021, defeating the number one and two seeds in consecutive days. The following year, Ben Shelton kept the NCAA singles championship in the program by winning the title in 2022.

== Year-by-year results ==
The Florida Gators overall record is 1,326–528–6 through the 2019–2020 season.

Season	Overall record	SEC record	National	SEC Season	SEC Tournament
1931–32	4–0	–	–	–	–
1932–33	4–0	–	–	–	–
1933–34	5–2	–	–	–	–
1934–35	4–5	–	–	–	–
1935–36	8–1	–	–	–	–
1936–37	6–0	–	–	–	–
1937–38	6–0	–	–	–	–
1938–39	6–0	–	–	–	–
1939–40	11–4	–	–	–	–
1940–41	10–2–1	–	–	–	–
1946–47	3–5–1	–	–	3rd	–
1947–48	9–6	–	–	–	–
1948–49	14–5–1	–	–	4th	–
1949–50	21–1	–	–	1st	–
1950–51	16–7	–	–	4th	–
1951–52	13–4	–	–	–	–
1952–53	15–3	–	–	T2nd	–
1953–54	14–3–1	–	–	4th	–
1954–55	16–1	–	–	2nd	–
1955–56	15–3	–	–	3rd	–
1956–57	18–3	–	–	3rd	–
1957–58	12–7	–	–	6th	–
1958–59	9–9	–	–	5th	–
1959–60	18–2	–	–	3rd	–
1960–61	20–1	–	–	1st	–
1961–62	15–5	–	–	T3rd	–
1962–63	11–4	–	18th	5th	–
1963–64	11–4	–	–	6th	–
1964–65	9–9	–	–	5th	–
1965–66	18–14	–	–	5th	–
1966–67	19–1–1	–	5th	3rd	–
1967–68	23–1	–	6th	1st	–
1968–69	19–1–1	–	6th	1st	–
1969–70	14–8	–	–	4th	–
1970–71	11–12	–	–	4th	–
1971–72	13–11	–	18th	5th	–
1972–73	20–6	–	22nd	3rd	–
1973–74	20–3	–	T13th	5th	–
1974–75	25–2	–	T8th	T1st	–
1975–76	18–2	–	16th	3rd	–
1976–77	21–3	–	–	4th	–
1977–78	22–4	–	–	5th	–
1978–79	17–9	–	–	T5th	–
1979–80	15–9–1	–	–	6th	–
1980–81	23–6	–	–	5th	–
1981–82	20–7	–	–	T3rd	–
1982–83	14–10	–	–	T8th	–
1983–84	17–10	–	–	T6th	–
1984–85	16–11	–	–	5th	–
1985–86	19–10	–	–	T7th	–
1986–87	16–8	–	–	4th	–
1987–88	3–20	–	–	T6th	–
1988–89	14–11	–	–	9th	–
1989–90	17–9	–	-	7th	–
1990–91	19–8	–	T5th	T3rd	–
1991–92	15–11	–	T9th	5th	–
1992–93	16–12	–	T9th	5th	–
1993–94	19–7	–	T9th	1st	1st
1994–95	18–11	–	T9th	5th	–
1995–96	16–9	–	T17th	5th	–
1996–97	31–1	–	T9th	5th	–
1997–98	27–0	–	T25th	T6th	–
1998–99	31–2	–	T5th	T3rd	–
1999–2000	25–3	10–1	T3rd	1st	1st
2000–01	9–17	3–8	T10th	3rd	–
2001–02	18–7	7–4	T9th	T3rd	2nd
2002–03	25–5	11–0	T5th	1st	–
2003–04	18–7	8–3	T9th	2nd	–
2004–05	24–6	10–1	T3rd	T1st	1st
2005–06	17–8	8–3	T9th	T2nd	–
2006–07	15–8	7–4	T9th	T3rd	–
2007–08	17–8	8–3	T9th	4th	2nd
2008–09	18–9	7–4	T17th	T4th	–
2009–10	21–5	9–1	T9th	2nd	2nd
2010–11	20–9	7–4	T9th	5th	1st
2011–12	16–10	7–4	T9th	4th	–
2012–13	15–11	7–5	T33rd	T3rd	–
2013–14	17–10	8–4	15th	4th	2nd
2014–15	14–9	8–4	T33rd	T4th	T5th
2015–16	21–7	10–2	T5th	2nd	1st
2016–17	19-10	9–3	T9th	3rd	T3rd
2017–18	19-10	9-3	T8th	3rd	T3rd
2018–19	25-4	12-0	T4th	1st	T3rd
2019–20	15-3	3-1	N/A	N/A (COVID)	–
2020–21	25-2	12-0	1st	1st	2nd
2021–22	26-3	12-0	1st	2nd	1st

== All-Americans ==
As of the end of the 2021–2022 season, thirty-one members of the Florida Gators men's tennis teams have earned sixty-one All-American honors.

- Ben Shelton - Singles (2021, 2022), 2022 NCAA Champion (singles)
- Sam Riffice - Doubles (2020), Singles (2019, 2020, 2021), 2021 NCAA Champion (singles)
- Oliver Crawford - Doubles (2020), Singles (2019, 2020)
- Duarte Vale - Doubles (2018), Singles (2020, 2021)
- McClain Kessler - Doubles (2018)
- Johannes Ingildsen - Doubles (2017, 2018)
- Alfredo Perez - Singles (2017, 2018), Doubles (2017, 2018)
- Diego Hidalgo – Singles (2016), Doubles (2016)
- Gordon Watson – Doubles (2016)
- Florent Diep – Singles (2014)
- Bob Van Overbeek – Doubles (2013)
- Stephane Piro – Doubles (2013)
- Sekou Bangoura – Doubles (2011)
- Alexndre Lacroix – Singles (2010, 2011), Doubles (2010, 2011)
- Antoine Benneteau – Doubles (2010)
- Gregory Ouellette – Singles (2005, 2007, 2008), Doubles (2005, 2007)
- Jesse Levine – Singles (2007), Doubles (2007)
- Hamid Mirzadeh – Singles (2003, 2004, 2005), Doubles (2004, 2005)
- Chris Brandi – Doubles (2004)
- Janne Holmia – Singles (2003)
- Justin O'Neal – Singles (1997, 1999, 2000)
- Jeff Morrison – Singles (1999, 2000), Doubles (1999, 2000), 1999 NCAA Champion (singles)
- Nathan Overholser – Singles (1999, 2000), Doubles (2000)
- Damon Henkel – Singles (1994, 1995, 1996)
- Dyllan Fitzgerald – Doubles (1994)
- Mark Merklein – Singles (1993, 1994), Doubles (1993, 1994), 1993 NCAA Champion (doubles), 1994 NCAA Champion (singles)
- David Blair – Doubles (1993), 1993 NCAA Champion (doubles)
- Armistead Neely – Singles (1969), Doubles (1968)
- Jamie Pressly – Singles (1969)
- Bill Tym – Singles (1963)
- Jim Shaffer – Singles (1961)

== See also ==
- Florida Gators
- Florida Gators women's tennis
- History of the University of Florida
- List of Florida Gators tennis players
- List of University of Florida Athletic Hall of Fame members
- University Athletic Association
