= Scott Stricklin (athletic director) =

American college athletics administrator (born 1970)

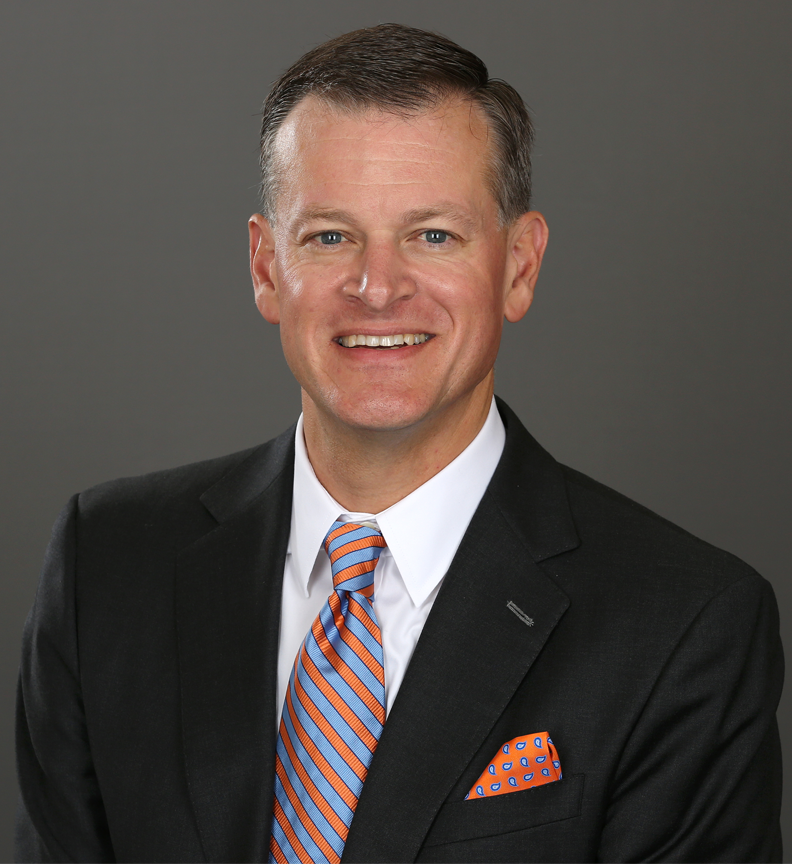

Current position
- Title: Athletic director
- Team: Florida
- Conference: SEC
- Annual salary: US$1.076 million

Biographical details
- Born: May 8, 1970 (age 56); Jackson, Mississippi, U.S.
- Education: Mississippi State University (1992)

Administrative career (AD unless noted)
- 1990–1992: Mississippi State (student asst. media relations)
- 1993–1998: Mississippi State (asst. media relations)
- 1993–1998: Auburn (assoc. media relations)
- 1998: Tulane (assist. AD)
- 1999–2003: Baylor (assist. AD)
- 2003–2008: Kentucky (assoc. AD)
- 2008–2010: Mississippi State (senior assoc. AD)
- 2010–2016: Mississippi State
- 2016–present: Florida

Scott Stricklin (born May 8, 1970) is an American college athletics administrator. He is currently the athletic director for the University of Florida, a position he has held since 2016. Before being hired by Florida, Stricklin served in various capacities in intercollegiate athletics at several different schools, most notably as athletic director at his alma mater, Mississippi State University, from 2010 to 2016.

== Early life, education and career ==
Stricklin is from Jackson, Mississippi. He attended Jackson Preparatory School in Flowood, Mississippi and earned a Bachelor’s of Science in Marketing from Mississippi State University in 1992. After working as a student assistant in the media relations office of Mississippi State, where he served three years as the baseball media contact, Stricklin was named assistant media relations director following his graduation. Following a year at Mississippi State, Stricklin was named associate media relations director at Auburn, where he served as the baseball contact from 1993 to 1998. In 1998, he took over the top media relations post at Tulane and coordinated media for the 12–0 Green Wave football team that season. A four-year stint at Baylor (1999–2003) as assistant AD for communications and marketing followed, before Stricklin returned to the Southeastern Conference as the associate AD for media relations at Kentucky. Stricklin returned to Mississippi State in 2008 as the senior associate athletics director for external affairs, overseeing fundraising efforts among many responsibilities.

== Athletic director career ==
=== Mississippi State ===
Stricklin was named director of athletics of Mississippi State University in 2010. Under Stricklin's tenure, MSU Athletics achieved its highest-ever Learfield Director’s Cup finish (44th in 2015–16). Stricklin, who was named Under Armour’s Athletics Director of the Year in April 2016, oversaw record fundraising for Mississippi State, which has produced new facilities such as the $11.7 million Mize Pavilion at Humphrey Coliseum, the $25 million Leo W. Seal Jr. Football Complex, as well as $75 million in expansion and upgrades to Davis Wade Stadium that were completed prior to the start of the 2014 campaign.

=== Florida ===
On November 1, 2016, Stricklin was hired as the University of Florida's director of athletics doubling his MSU salary of $500,000 to $1 million (and bonuses that could increase the salary to $1.4 million). During his first year as director of athletics, Stricklin and head football coach Jim McElwain mutually agreed to have McElwain resign as Florida's head coach.

One of Stricklin's responsibilities as the University of Florida's athletic director is to act as chief financial officer (CFO) for the University Athletic Association.

On November 26, 2017, Stricklin hired Dan Mullen as head coach of the University of Florida football team. Mullen was head football coach at Mississippi State during Stricklin's tenure as athletic director at Mississippi State.

Bill Hancock, executive director of the College Football Playoff (CFP), announced Scott Stricklin was appointed to the selection committee by the CFP Management Committee. Stricklin will serve a three-year term beginning in the spring of 2018.

== Personal life ==
Stricklin is married to the former Anne Howell, the youngest daughter of Basketball Hall of Fame member Bailey Howell. The couple has two daughters.

Scott was lovingly known as the “Ninja” while in his post as Athletic Director at Mississippi State University.
