= List of Florida Gators tennis players =

This list of University of Florida tennis players includes former athletes of the men's and women's tennis teams of the University of Florida who have competed on the professional tennis circuit. The list includes such athletes as Lisa Raymond, Nicole Arendt, Jill Craybas, and Jesse Levine.

== Players ==
Name	Notability
Jillian Alexander	Former pro tennis player
Nicole Arendt	Former pro tennis player
Brooke Austin	Former pro tennis player
Andrea Berger	Former pro tennis player
Marrit Boonstra	Former pro tennis player
Dawn Buth	Former pro tennis player
Julia Cohen	Former pro tennis player
Jill Craybas	Former pro tennis player
Anna Danilina	Active pro tennis player
Ingelise Driehuis	Former pro tennis player
Lauren Embree	Former pro tennis player
Jill Hetherington	Former pro tennis player
Kourtney Keegan	Former pro tennis player
Whitney Laiho	Former pro tennis player
Jessica Lehnhoff	Former pro tennis player
Jesse Levine	Former pro tennis player
Mark Merklein	Former pro tennis player
Jeff Morrison	Former pro tennis player
Ingrid Neel	Active pro tennis player
Stephanie Nickitas	Former pro tennis player
Siobhán Nicholson	Former pro tennis player
Gregory Ouellette	Former pro tennis player
Sofie Oyen	Former pro tennis player
Lisa Raymond	Former pro tennis player
Shaun Stafford	Former pro tennis player
Ryan Sweeting	Former pro tennis player
Allie Will	Former pro tennis player
Belinda Woolcock	Active pro tennis player

== Gallery ==
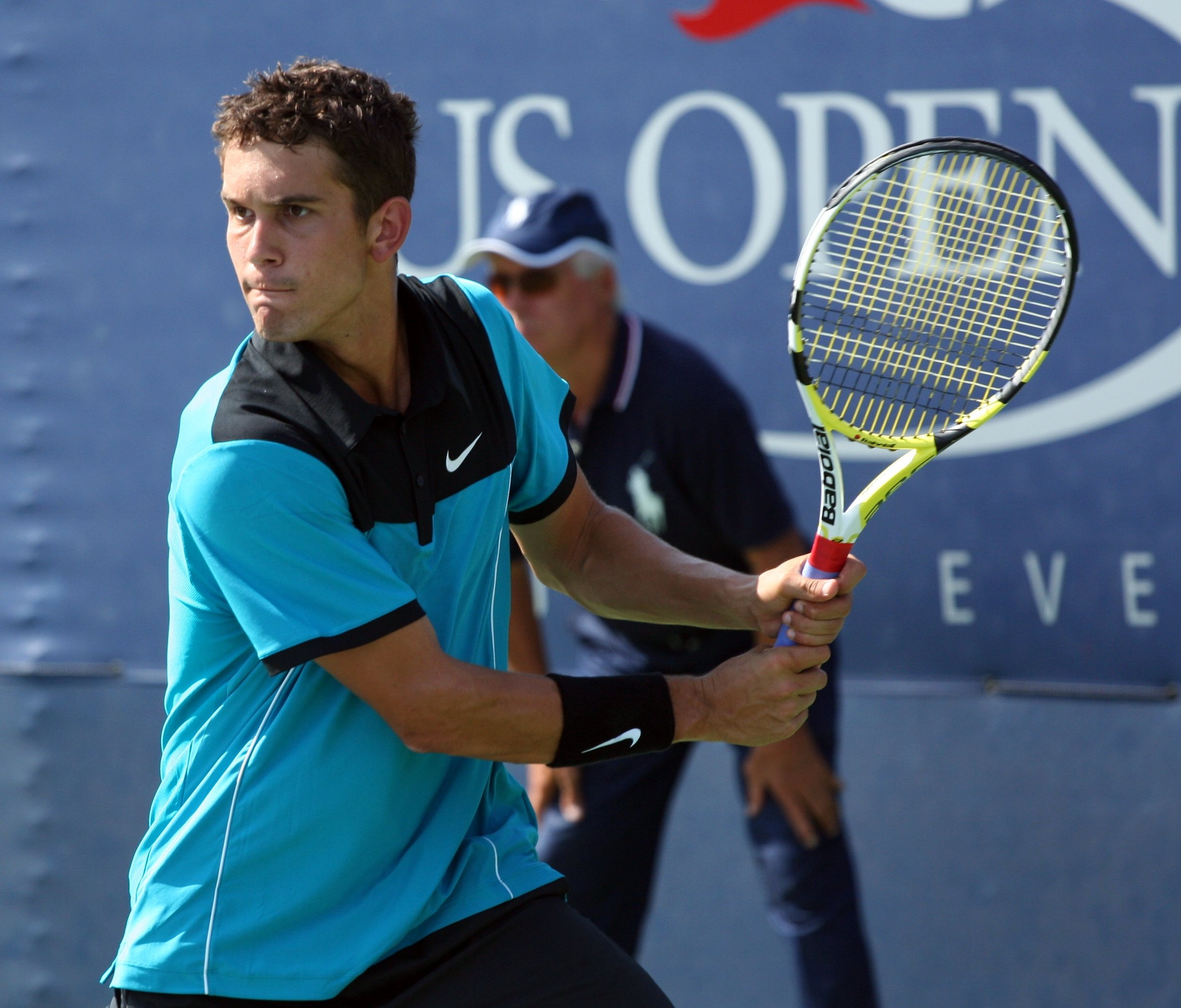
Ryan Sweeting

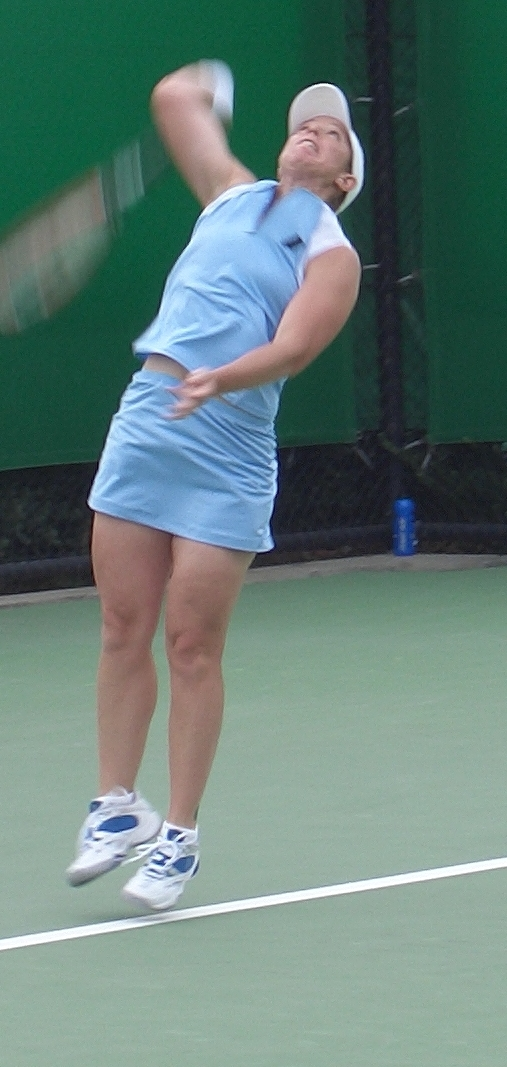
Lisa Raymond

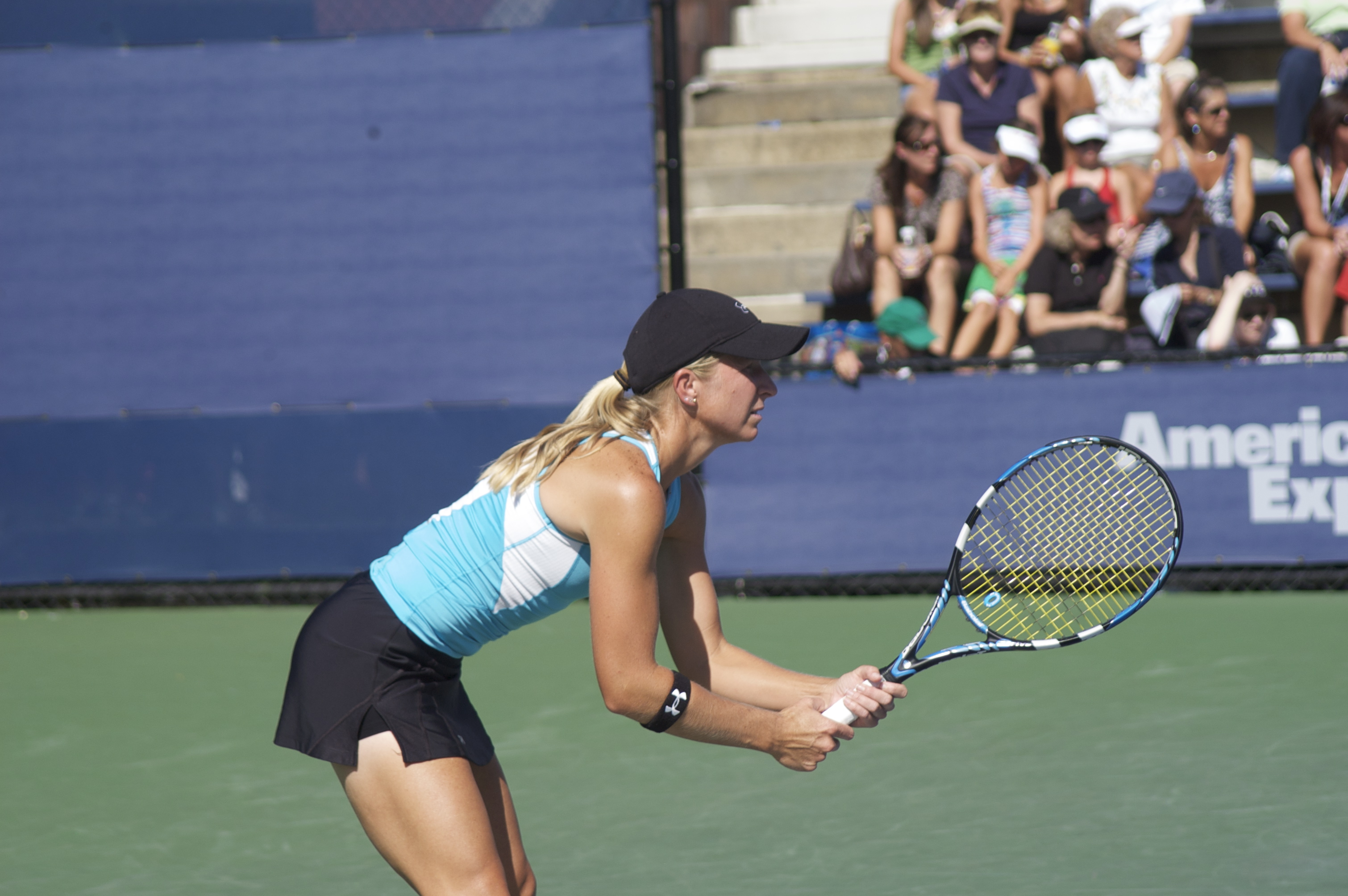
Jill Craybas

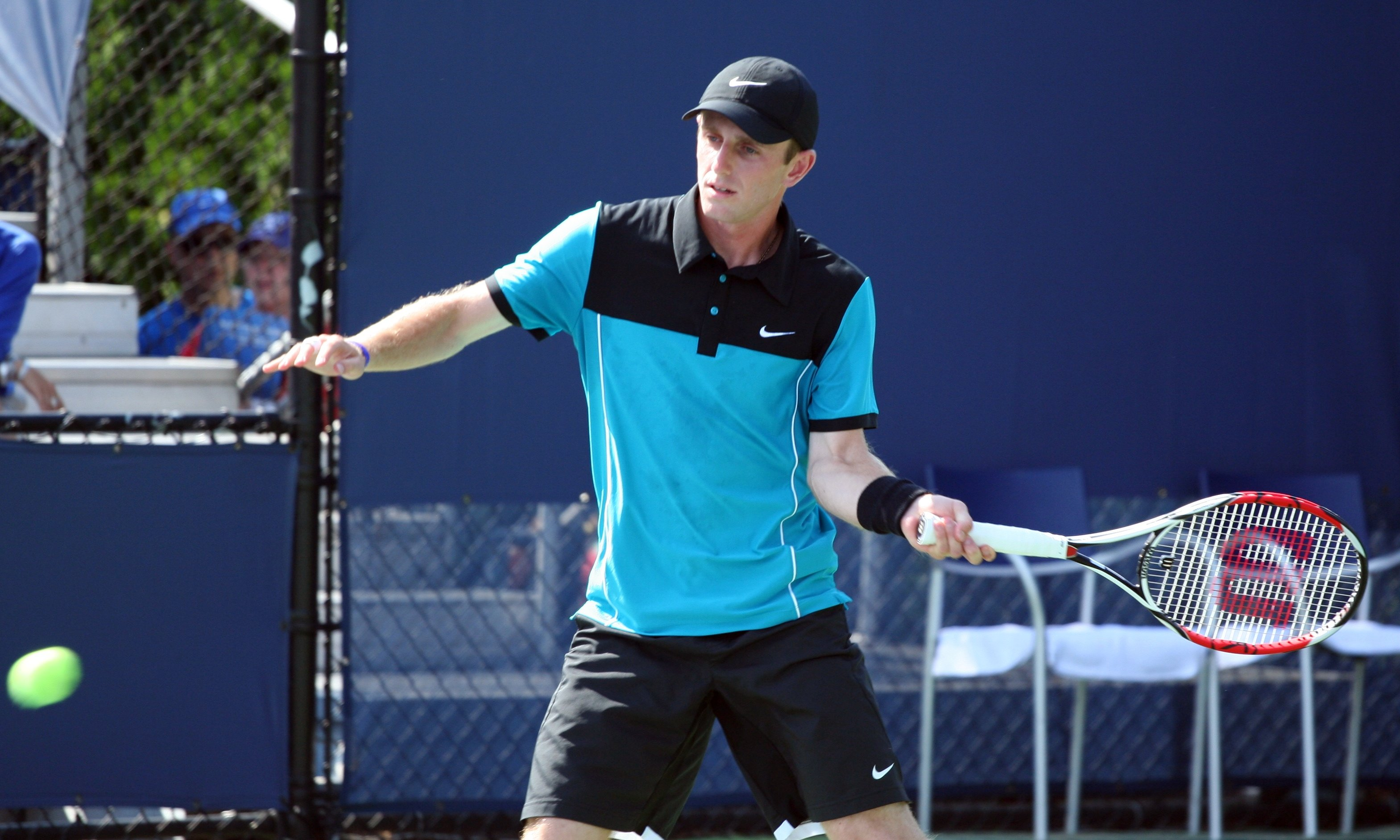
Jesse Levine

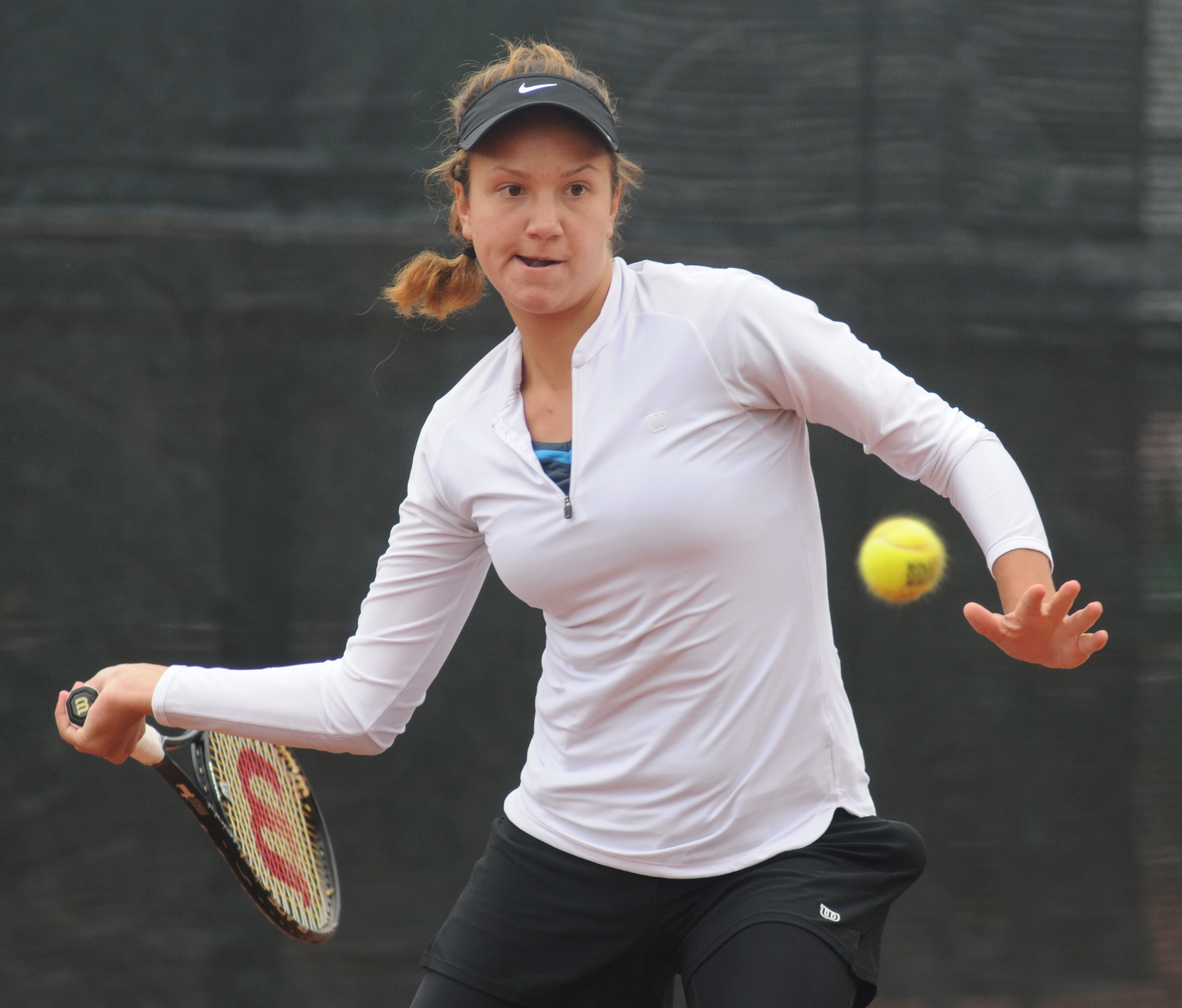
Anna Danilina

== See also ==
- Florida Gators
- List of University of Florida alumni
- List of University of Florida Athletic Hall of Fame members
- List of University of Florida Olympians
