= 1987 Eckerd Open =

- Date: April 27 – May 3
- Edition: 15th
- Category: Category 3
- Draw: 32S / 16D
- Prize money: $150,000
- Surface: Clay / outdoor
- Location: Tampa, Florida, U.S.
- Venue: Bardmoor Country Club

Champions

Singles
- (United States) Chris Evert

Doubles
- (United States) Chris Evert / (Australia) Wendy Turnbull
← 1986 ·	Eckerd Open	· 1988 →

The 1987 Eckerd Open was a women's tennis tournament played on outdoor clay courts at the Bardmoor Country Club in Tampa, Florida in the United States and was part of the Category 3 tier of the 1987 Virginia Slims World Championship Series. It was the 15th edition of the tournament and was held from April 27 through May 3, 1987. First-seeded Chris Evert won the singles title and earned $30,500 first-prize money.

== Finals ==
=== Singles ===
(United States) Chris Evert defeated (United States) Kate Gompert 6–3, 6–2

- It was Evert's 3rd singles title of the year and the 151st of her career.

=== Doubles ===
(United States) Chris Evert / (Australia) Wendy Turnbull defeated (United States) Elise Burgin / (South Africa) Rosalyn Fairbank 6–4, 6–3
