= Shaun Stafford =

American tennis player (born 1968)

- Country (sports): United States
- Residence: Williamston, South Carolina, U.S.
- Born: December 13, 1968 (age 56) Ocala, Florida, U.S.
- Height: 5 ft 11.5 in (1.816 m)
- Turned pro: 1989
- Retired: 1996
- Plays: Right-handed (two-handed backhand)
- College: University of Florida
- Prize money: $786,504

Singles
- Career record: 192–152
- Career titles: 1 WTA
- Highest ranking: No. 48 (January 22, 1990)

Grand Slam singles results
- Australian Open: 3R (1991)
- French Open: 4R (1994)
- Wimbledon: 3R (1989, 1993, 1995)
- US Open: 3R (1989, 1990, 1994)

Doubles
- Career record: 119–138
- Career titles: 1 WTA
- Highest ranking: No. 33 (May 16, 1994)

Grand Slam doubles results
- Australian Open: QF (1994)
- French Open: 3R (1993)
- Wimbledon: 3R (1991)
- US Open: 2R (1991, 1993)

Mixed doubles
- Career titles: 0

Grand Slam mixed doubles results
- Australian Open: 1R (1990, 1992, 1995)
- French Open: 2R (1989, 1990, 1991, 1994, 1995)
- Wimbledon: 2R (1990)
- US Open: 2R (1994)
- Last updated on: March 13, 2012.

Shaun Stafford Beckish (born December 13, 1968), née Shaun Stafford, is an American former college and professional tennis player who played on the Women's Tennis Association (WTA) tour from 1989 to 1996. As a collegiate tennis player, Stafford won the 1988 NCAA national singles championship while playing for the University of Florida. She won two WTA tournaments in her professional career, one in singles and the other in doubles.

== Early years ==
Stafford was born in Ocala, Florida, but moved to Gainesville, Florida with her family when she was 11 years old. She graduated from Buchholz High School in Gainesville, where she played for the Buchholz Bobcats high school tennis team. As a junior in 1985, she was the high school state singles champion. As a senior in 1986, Stafford won the Florida Class 4A state singles championship again, and she and partner Kim Dunn reached the finals of the state doubles championship, too. Her older sister, Nicole, played college tennis for the Clemson Tigers women's tennis team.

== College career ==
Stafford accepted an athletic scholarship to attend the University of Florida in Gainesville, where she played for coach Andy Brandi's Florida Gators women's tennis team in National Collegiate Athletic Association (NCAA) competition in 1987 and 1988. As a s freshman, she was an individual singles finalist in the 1987 NCAA tournament, losing to Patty Fendick of the Stanford Cardinal women's tennis team. As a sophomore, Stafford was the No. 1 singles player for the Lady Gators' NCAA national runner-up team in 1988. She won the individual NCAA singles championship by defeating her Gator teammate Halle Cioffi, 7–6, 6–4, by relying on her strong serve and forehand in the tournament final in 1988. She previously defeated top-seeded Ronni Reis of the Miami Hurricanes women's team, 6–1, 7–6, in the 1988 NCAA semifinal. She was a two-time All-American and a two-time first-team All-Southeastern Conference (SEC) selection, and was also the recipient of the 1987–88 Broderick Award (now the Honda Sports Award) as the outstanding college women's tennis player in the country.

She was inducted into the University of Florida Athletic Hall of Fame as a "Gator Great" in 1999.

== Professional career ==
Stafford turned professional in 1989. She won two WTA tournaments: the 1992 Taiwan Open singles title, and the 1993 Internationaux de Strasbourg doubles title with partner Andrea Temesvári. She and partner Cammy MacGregor were also the runners-up in the 1993 Melbourne Open doubles tournament, losing in the final to Jill Hetherington and Kathy Rinaldi.

Her highest world singles ranking was No. 48 on January 22, 1990; her highest world doubles ranking was No. 33 on May 16, 1994. Her best Grand Slam singles tournament was the fourth round (round of sixteen) of the 1994 French Open; her best Grand Slam doubles performance was reaching the quarterfinals (round of eight) of the 1994 Australian Open. Her career earnings totaled $786,504.

Stafford and partner Jack Waite participated in the mixed doubles competition at the 1995 Pan American Games in Mar del Plata, Argentina, and won the gold medal.

She is remembered for being an emotional and verbally expressive player on the WTA tour.

== Life after playing career ==
After retiring from WTA Tour, she was an assistant coach for the Duke Blue Devils women's tennis team from 1997 to 1998. Duke reached the finals of the 1998 NCAA national championship tournament.

Stafford married physician Michael Beckish in July 1996. They live in Williamston, South Carolina, a suburb of Greenville.

== Popular culture ==
In the movie King Richard, about Venus and Serena Williams's father, her character was played by Kaitlyn Christian.

== See also ==
- Florida Gators
- List of Florida Gators tennis players
- List of University of Florida Athletic Hall of Fame members
