= University of Florida Athletic Association =

Non-profit corporation

University Athletic Association
- Established: 1929
- Director: Scott Stricklin
- Location: Gainesville, Florida, U.S.
- Website: www.uaa.ufl.edu

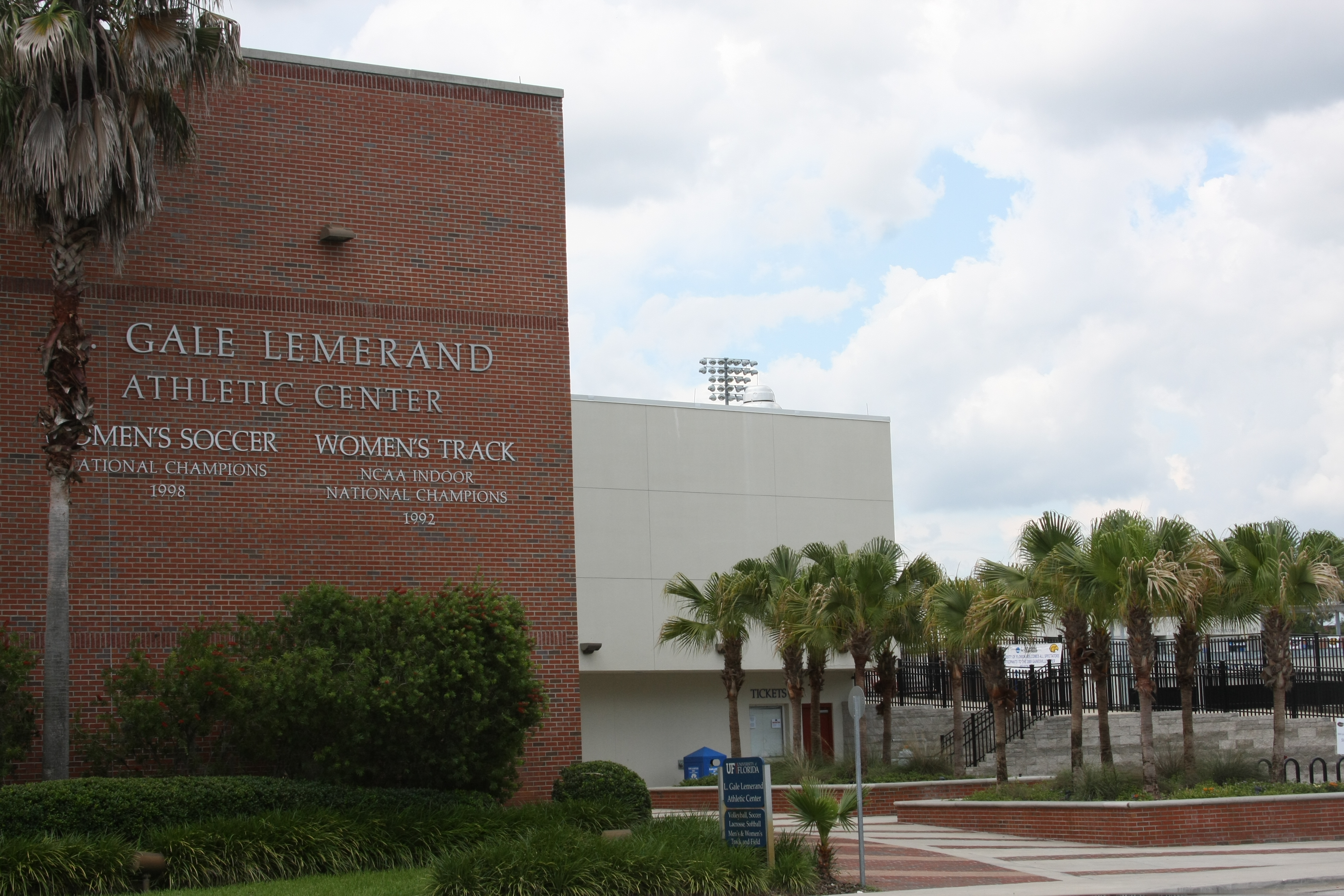
The Lemerand Center, home of the UAA.

The University Athletic Association, Inc. (UAA) is a non-profit corporation that is responsible for maintaining the Florida Gators intercollegiate sports program of the University of Florida in Gainesville, Florida. The UAA is run by a board of directors led by the University of Florida's athletic director. The athletic director also acts as the UAA's chief financial officer and reports directly to the president of the university.

The modern University of Florida began participation in intercollegiate sports immediately upon opening at its Gainesville campus in 1906. Records indicate the existence of a UF "Athletic Association" as early as 1909, with the organization led by student representatives and predominantly involved with distributing the limited athletic funds allocated by the university.

The modern University Athletic Association was incorporated in 1929 with impetus from university president John J. Tigert to oversee the construction of Florida Field. Since then, its mission has grown to include operating and improving all of the school's athletic programs and facilities. As of the 2017–18 academic year, the UAA had an annual operating budget of $128 million which is funded entirely through its own revenues with additional support from Gator Boosters, the fundraising arm of the athletic department. The UAA does not depend on the University of Florida's state funding for financial support, and has contributed over $80 million to the school's academic programs since 1990.

== Current varsity sports ==
The University of Florida fields teams in nine men's sports and twelve women's sports, all administered by the UAA:

Men's sports

- Baseball
- Basketball
- Cross Country
- Football
- Golf
- Swimming & Diving
- Tennis
- Track & Field

Women's sports

- Basketball
- Cross Country
- Golf
- Gymnastics
- Lacrosse
- Soccer
- Softball
- Swimming & Diving
- Tennis
- Track & Field
- Volleyball

The Florida men's and women's track and field teams are counted twice in the total number of sports teams because Florida's track and field athletes compete in the separate indoor and outdoor track and field seasons sanctioned by the NCAA.

== Athletic directors ==
Fifteen men have served as the athletic director of the University of Florida's intercollegiate sports program since the position was created in 1917. Beginning with Edgar C. Jones in 1930, the athletic director has also led the UAA.

- Alfred L. Buser (1917–20)*
- William G. Kline (1920–23)*
- James L. White (1923–25)
- Everett M. Yon (1925–28)
- Charlie Bachman (1928–30)*
- Edgar C. Jones (1930–36)
- Josh Cody (1936–39)*
- Tom Lieb (1940–45)*
- Raymond Wolf (1946–49)*
- Bob Woodruff (1950–59)*
- Ray Graves (1960–79)*
- Bill Carr (1979–86)
- Bill Arnsparger (1986–92)
- Jeremy Foley (1992–2016)
- Scott Stricklin (2016– )

* indicates also served as Florida's head football coach

Nine of the University of Florida's fifteen athletic directors also served as the head coach of the Florida Gators football team. This was once a common arrangement at American universities, especially in the first half of the 20th century, when athletic departments were loosely organized and operated on much smaller budgets than today's major college programs. Some of Florida's athletic directors also coached other sports while serving as the school's AD – James White coached basketball and baseball, while Edgar Jones coached golf. Some of UF's athletic directors were alumni who had been scholarship athletes at the school, including Everett Yon, Edgar Jones and Bill Carr. While Bill Arnsparger was not a Florida graduate and never coached at the school, he was serving as the head coach of the LSU Tigers football team when he accepted an offer to become Florida's AD in 1986, and he left the administrative position to resume his coaching career as an assistant in the National Football League.

The last person to serve as Florida's AD while simultaneously coaching was Ray Graves, who resigned as Florida's head football coach in 1970 but remained on as the school's athletic director, a post he had already held for ten years. Jeremy Foley, who spent his entire working career with UF's Athletic Association, became the first UF AD to have never been a college coach or scholarship athlete when he was promoted to the position in 1992. Scott Stricklin, who has served as Florida's AD since Foley's retirement, arrived with extensive management experience in university athletic departments but had similarly never been a college coach or player.

== See also ==
- History of the University of Florida
- List of University of Florida Athletic Hall of Fame members
