= Jillian Alexander =

Canadian tennis player

Jill Alexander
- Full name: Jillian Alexander-Brower
- Country (sports): Canada
- Born: 2 April 1968; Kingston, Jamaica
- Died: 25 October 2004 (aged 36); Gainesville, Florida, U.S.
- Prize money: $15,493

Singles
- Highest ranking: No. 303 (13 April 1987)

Doubles
- Career titles: 3 ITF
- Highest ranking: No. 243 (12 October 1992)

Grand Slam doubles results
- US Open: 1R (1991)

Jillian Alexander-Brower (2 April 1968 - 25 October 2004) was a Canadian professional tennis player.

Alexander was Jamaican by birth, but raised in Oakville, Ontario from the age of nine. She played college tennis for the University of Florida and won the 1991 NCAA Division I doubles championship with Nicole Arendt.

On the professional tour she reached a career best singles ranking of 303 in the world and had a best doubles ranking of 243. She made several appearance at her home WTA Tour tournament, the Canadian Open, then in 1991 partnered college teammate Nicole Arendt in the main draw of the US Open.

Following her tennis career she remained in Florida and died of ovarian cancer in 2004 at the age of 36.

== ITF finals ==
=== Singles: 2 (0–2) ===
Outcome	No.	Date	Tournament	Surface	Opponent	Score
Runner-up	1.	3 July 1989	Knoxville, United States	Hard	(United States) Patti O'Reilly	2–6, 1–6
Runner-up	2.	3 November 1991	Kingston, Jamaica	Hard	(United States) Jeri Ingram	7–6^{(8)}, 6–7^{(4)}, 3–6

=== Doubles: 6 (3–3) ===
Outcome	No.	Date	Tournament	Surface	Partner	Opponents	Score
Winner	1.	2 June 1991	Naples, United States	Hard	(United States) Nicole Arendt	(United States) Karen Gallego (United States) Susan Gilchrist	4–6, 6–4, 6–3
Runner-up	1.	9 June 1991	Key Biscayne, United States	Hard	(United States) Nicole Arendt	(United States) Lisa Albano (United States) Cara Abe	Unknown
Winner	2.	3 November 1991	Kingston, Jamaica	Hard	(Netherlands) Claire Wegink	(Philippines) Jean Lozano (Puerto Rico) Emilie Viqueira	6–3, 6–1
Runner-up	2.	19 January 1992	Mission, United States	Hard	(Netherlands) Claire Wegink	(United States) Susan Gilchrist (United States) Vickie Paynter	4–6, 2–6
Winner	3.	1 June 1992	Key Biscayne, United States	Hard	(United States) Niurka Sodupe	(Netherlands) Hellas ter Riet (Peru) Gianfranca Devercelli	6–2, 6–4
Runner-up	3.	14 June 1992	Largo, United States	Clay	(United States) Stacey Schefflin	(United States) Susan Gilchrist (United States) Vickie Paynter	6–1, 6–7^{(4)}, 2–6
