= Mark Bostick Golf Course =

University of Florida golf course

Mark Bostick Golf Course at the University of Florida
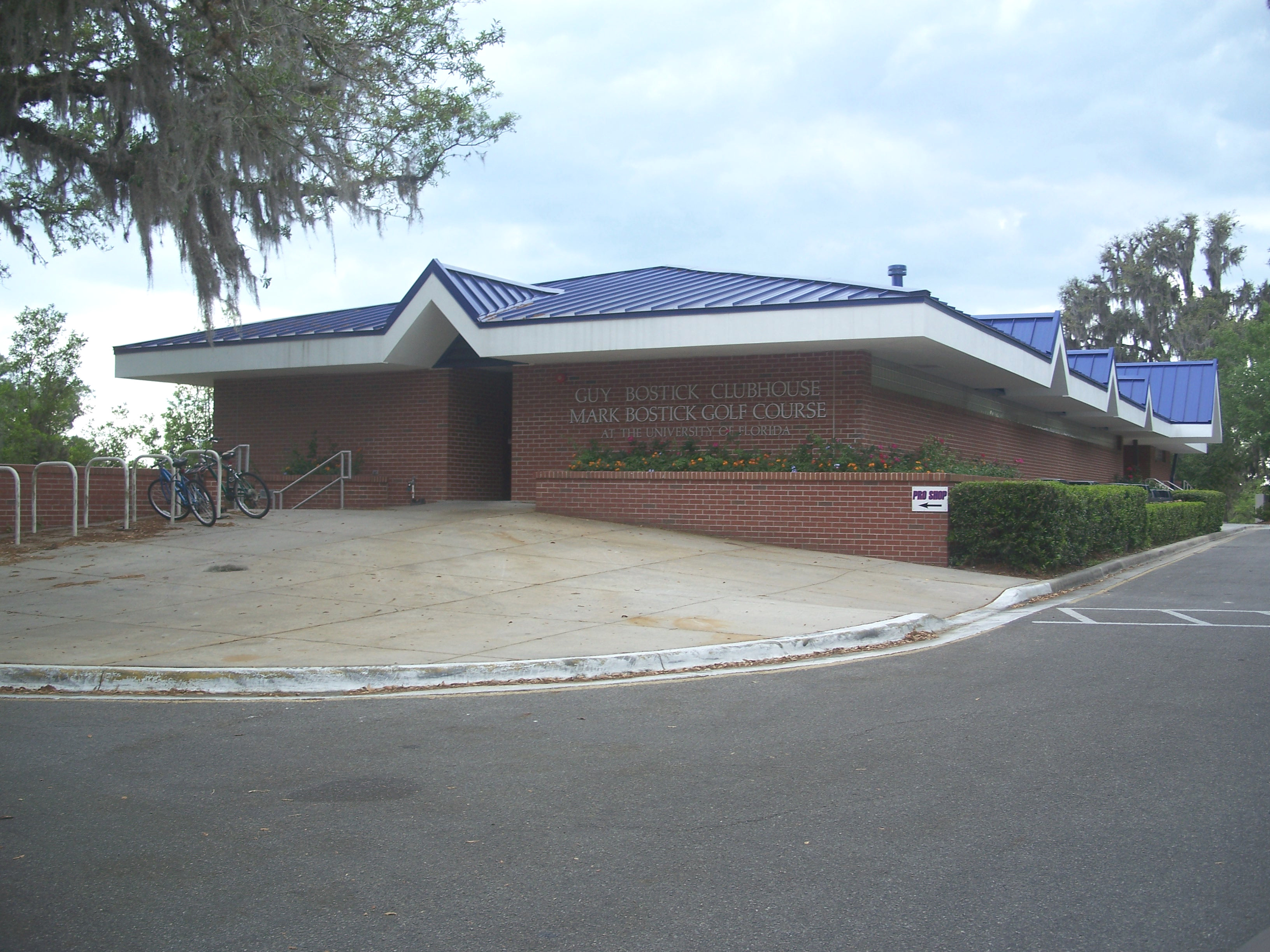

Club information
- Location: Gainesville, Florida, U.S.
- Established: 1921
- Type: Public / University
- Owner: University of Florida
- Operator: University Athletic Association
- Tota holes: 18
- Tournaments: Gator Invitational; Lady Gator Invitational; Gator Golf Day Pro-Am
- Website: Official website
- Designed by: Donald Ross, 1921; Bobby Weed, 2001
- Par: 70
- Length: 6,701 yards
- Course record: 60

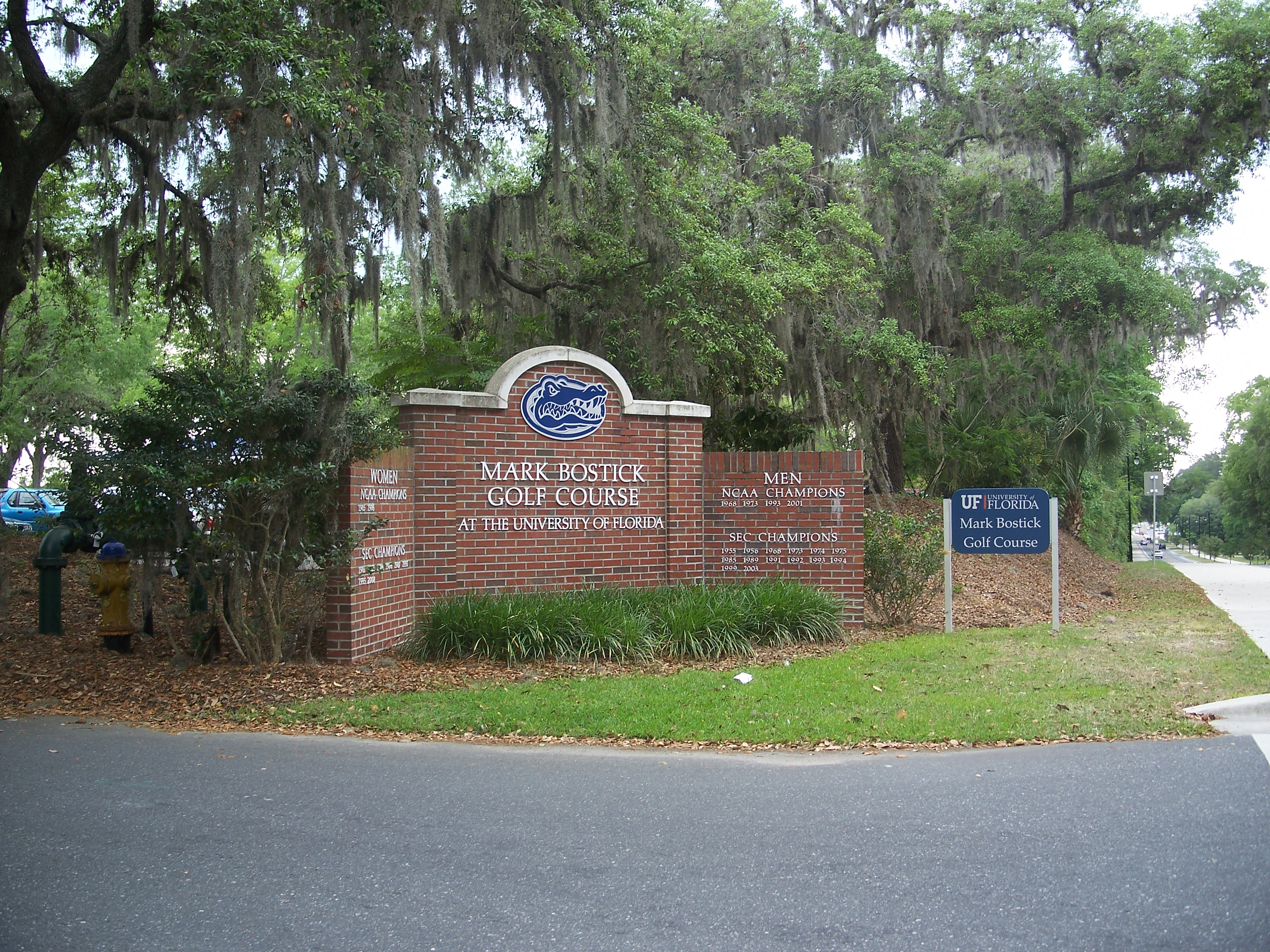
Mark Bostick Golf Course entrance monument on the Gainesville, Florida campus of the University of Florida.

The Mark Bostick Golf Course at the University of Florida, located in, is the home course of the Florida Gators men's golf and Florida Gators women's golf teams. The course is owned by the university and operated by the University Athletic Association (UAA).

The Bostick Golf Course is located on 118 acres (0.48 km^{2}) of softly rolling terrain on the northwest corner of the university campus, adjoining S.W. 34th Street and S.W. 2nd Avenue. It is less than a mile from the central undergraduate campus. It is heavily lined with trees, and includes over 140 bunkers. The facilities include the Guy Bostick Club House and a dedicated practice area for the Gators men's and women's golf teams. The course is named for Mark Bostick – President of Comcar Industries and a generous donor to the Florida Gators athletics program.

The course was formerly the home of the Gainesville Country Club, and was acquired by the university in 1963. Noted Scottish golfer and golf course architect Donald Ross designed the course in 1921, when it was originally owned and operated by the country club. In 2001, golf course architect Bobby Weed renovated the facility, with $4 million in private donations. As part of the renovation, the course length was stretched by 500 yards, to a total length just over 6,700 yards, and re-rated as a par 70. MacCurrach Golf Construction, Inc. was the primary construction contractor. When completed in November 2001, the University Athletic Association celebrated the occasion with "Gator Golf Day," an alumni golf event that included former Gator golf greats.

The Mark Bostick Golf Course hosts the annual Gator Invitational and Lady Gator Invitational tournaments, as well as the annual Gator Golf Day alumni event. The course has also served as the site for the NCAA Regional tournament on several occasions, including 2009. The club house has served a faculty club meeting place, and a venue for student organization events.

University of Florida students, faculty, staff and alumni may play the course. Tee times may be scheduled in advance, Friday through Sunday.

== Scorecard ==
The par and yardage shown are from the orange tees, which may be played only with permission from the course management. Players can play from the shorter blue, white or red (ladies) tees without course permission.

#	1	2	3	4	5	6	7	8	9	Out
Par	4	3	5	4	4	3	5	3	4	35
Yds	376	176	578	437	453	207	565	191	379	3,362

#	10	11	12	13	14	15	16	17	18	In
Par	4	3	5	4	4	3	4	4	4	35
Yds	418	145	525	467	371	198	441	336	438	3,339

== Cross country ==
The Mark Bostick Golf Course is the home course for the Florida Gators men's and women's cross country teams.

== Images ==
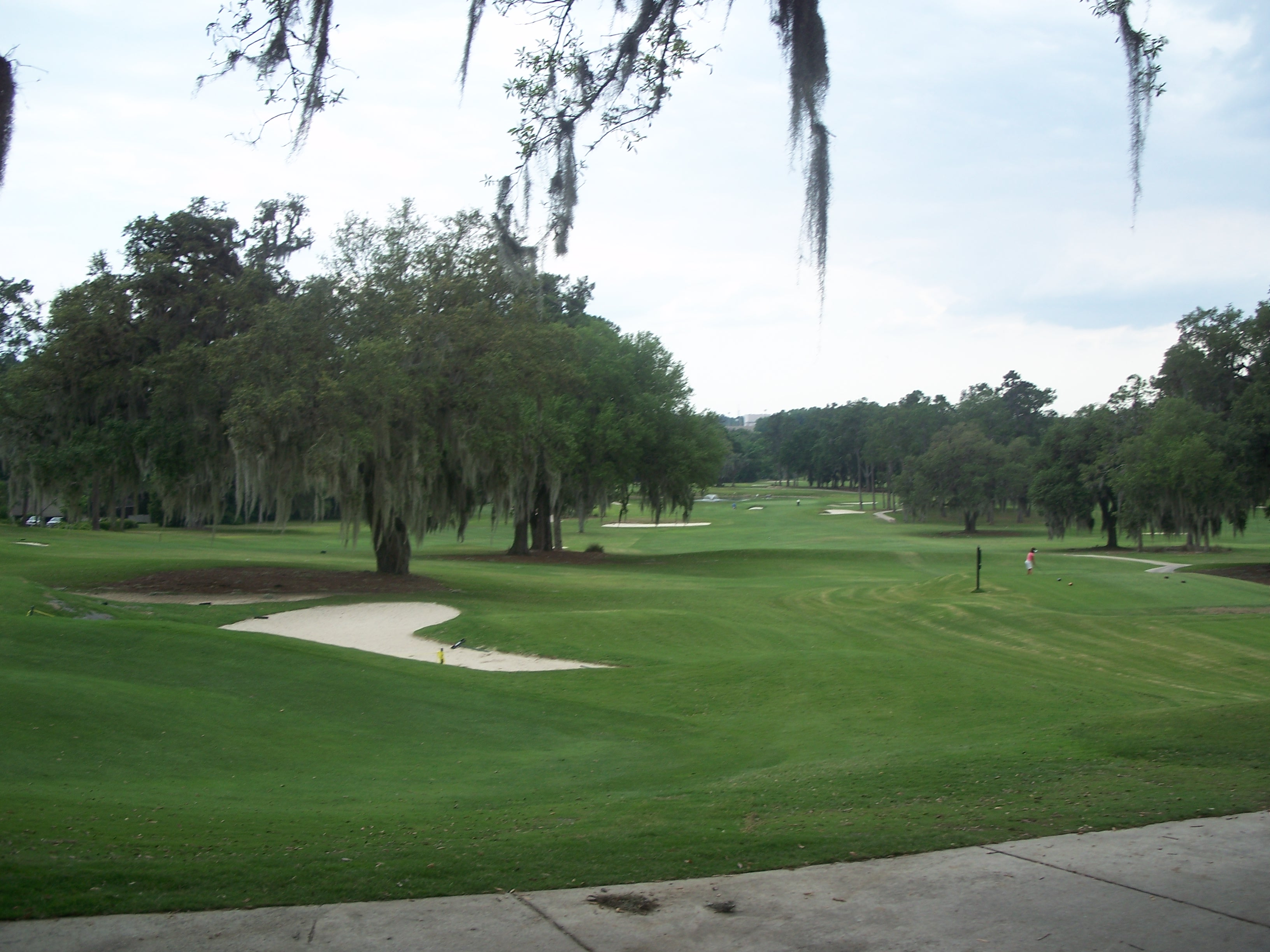

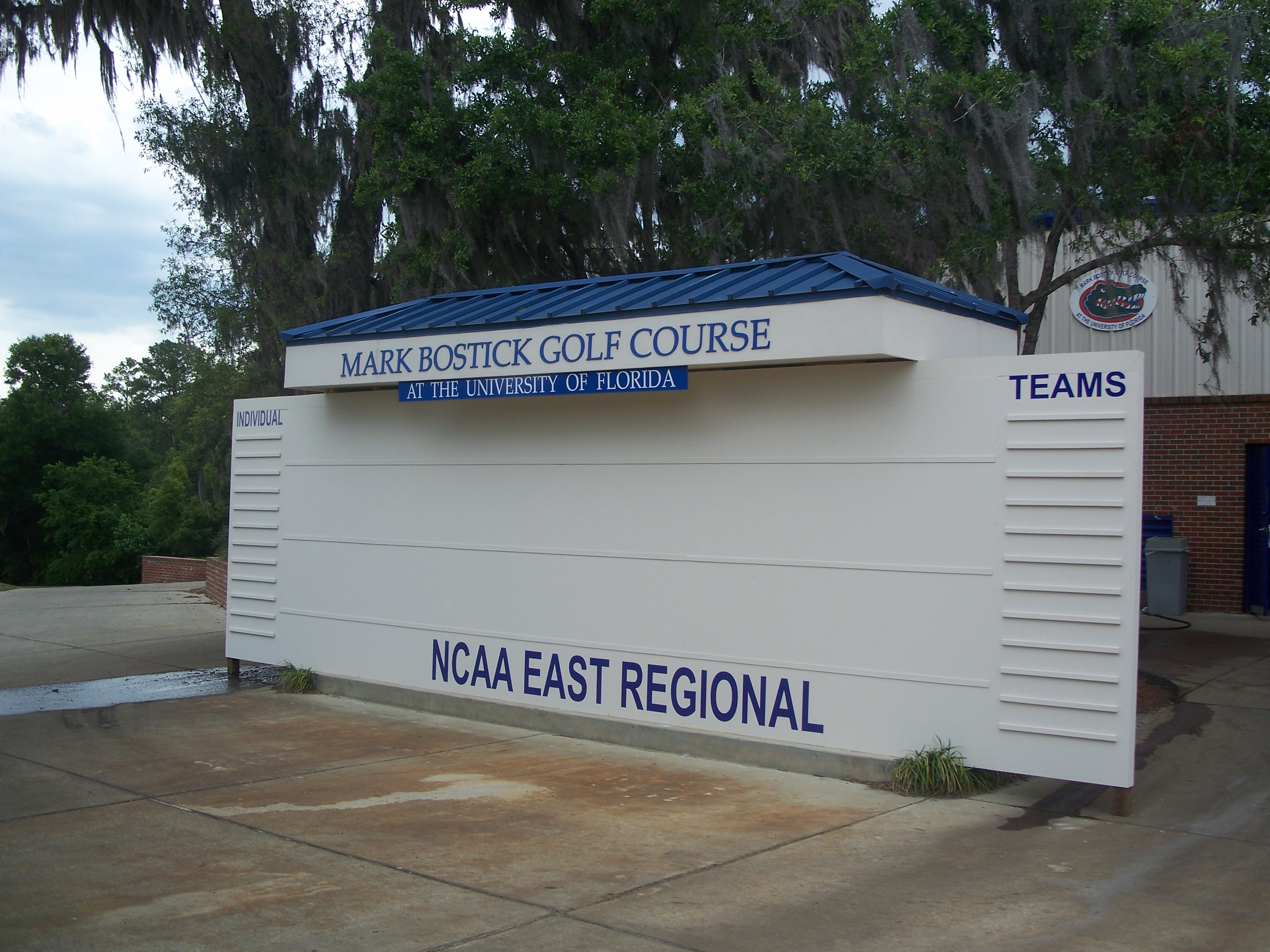

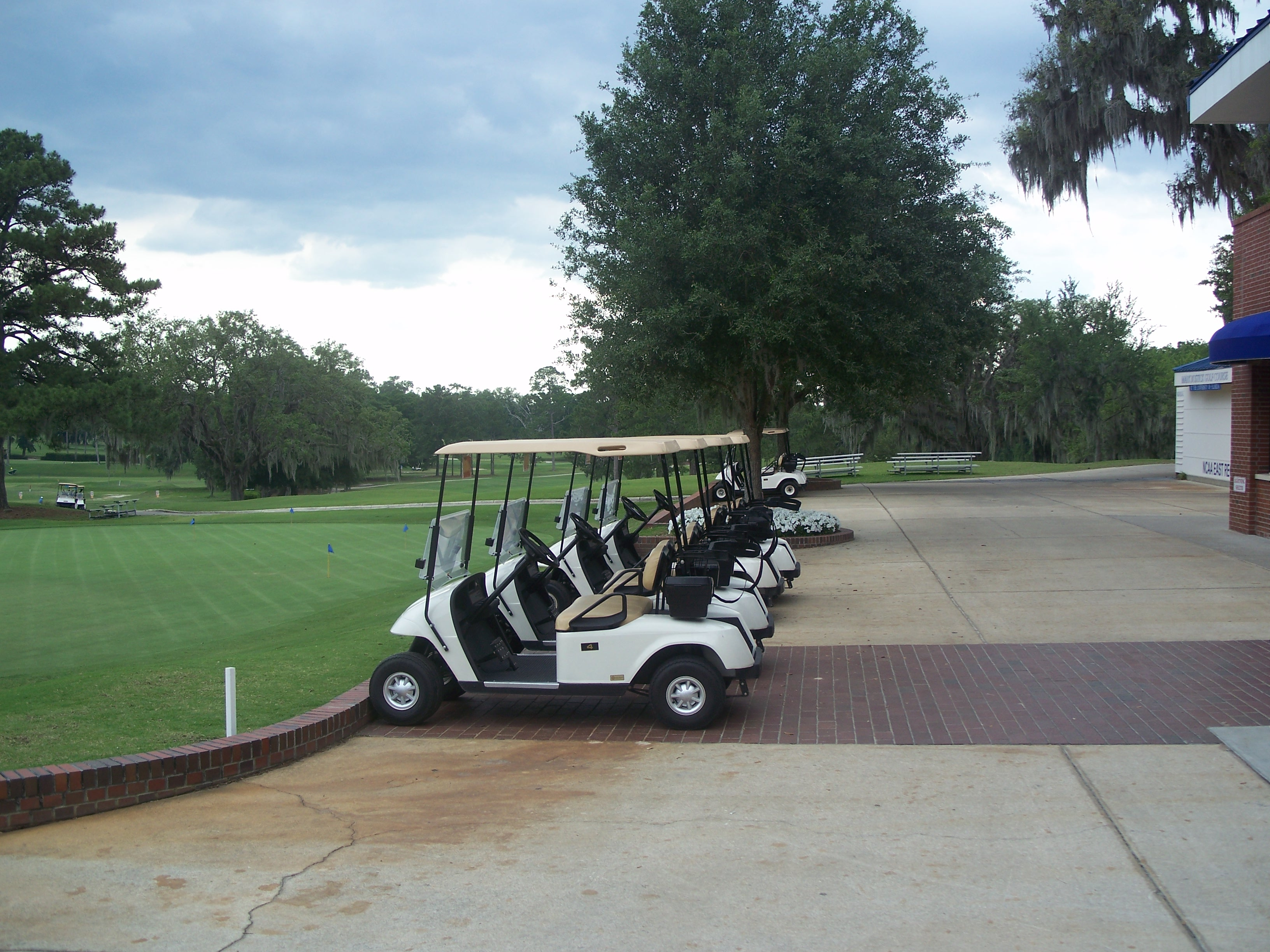

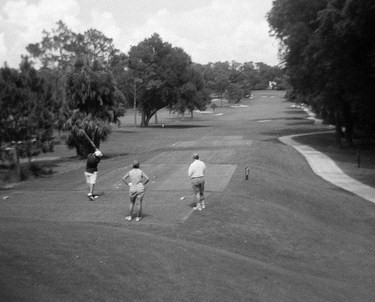

== See also ==
- Emily Glaser
- Florida Gators
- Golf
- Golf course
- List of University of Florida buildings
- University Athletic Association
