= Florida Gators =

University of Florida sports teams

- University: University of Florida
- Nickname: Gators
- NCAA: Division I (FBS)
- Conference: SEC (primary); Big 12 (women's lacrosse)
- Athletic director: Scott Stricklin
- Location: Gainesville, Florida
- Varsity teams: 19 (8 men's, 11 women's)
- Football stadium: Ben Hill Griffin Stadium
- Basketball arena: Exactech Arena at Stephen C. O'Connell Center
- Baseball stadium: Condron Family Ballpark
- Softball stadium: Katie Seashole Pressly Stadium
- Soccer stadium: Donald R. Dizney Stadium
- Lacrosse stadium: Donald R. Dizney Stadium
- Tennis venue: Alfred A. Ring Tennis Complex
- Volleyball arena: Exactech Arena at Stephen C. O'Connell Center
- Other venues: James G. Pressly Stadium; Stephen C. O'Connell Center Natatorium; Mark Bostick Golf Course
- Colors: Orange and blue
- Mascot: Albert and Alberta Gator
- Fight song: "The Orange and Blue"
- Website: floridagators.com

Team NCAA championships
- 49

Individual and relay NCAA champions
- 367

SEC logo in Florida’s colors

The Florida Gators are the intercollegiate athletic teams that represent the University of Florida, located in Gainesville. The University of Florida, its athletic program, its alumni and its sports fans are often collectively referred to as the "Gator Nation". The Gators compete in the National Collegiate Athletic Association (NCAA) and the Southeastern Conference (SEC) (Note: For all sports except women's lacrosse. Women's lacrosse competes in the Big 12 Conference.) and are consistently ranked among the top college sports programs in the United States. The University of Florida currently fields teams in nine men's sports and twelve women's sports.

All Florida Gators sports teams compete in NCAA Division I, and 20 of the 21 Gators teams compete in the SEC. The sole University of Florida sports team that does not play in the SEC is the women's lacrosse team, which plays a sport the SEC has never sponsored. That team joined the Big 12 Conference in 2024 in advance of that conference's first women's lacrosse season in spring 2025. The Gators joined the Big 12 after having been a single-sport member of the American Athletic Conference since the 2019 lacrosse season. The University of Florida was one of the thirteen charter members who joined to form the new Southeastern Conference in 1932. Previously, the university was a member of the Southern Intercollegiate Athletic Association from 1912 to 1921 and the Southern Conference from 1922 until the SEC began play in the fall of 1933.

All Florida Gators sports teams have on-campus facilities, and most are located on or near Stadium Road on the north side of campus, including Steve Spurrier-Florida Field at Ben Hill Griffin Stadium for football; the Exactech Arena at the Stephen C. O'Connell Center for basketball, gymnastics, swimming and diving, indoor track and field, and volleyball; and James G. Pressly Stadium for outdoor track and field. The Katie Seashole Pressly Softball Stadium, the Condron Ballpark, and the Donald R. Dizney Stadium for soccer and lacrosse are located on Hull Road on the southwestern side of the campus. The Mark Bostick Golf Course and Scott Linder Stadium for tennis are located on S.W. Second Avenue on the northwestern side of the campus.

The Florida Gators athletic program is administered by the University Athletic Association, Inc. (UAA), a private non-profit corporation that reports to the president of the university and its board of trustees. For the 2014–15 school year, the UAA had an operating budget of $103,310,001, projected revenues of $104,064,487, and made a $3.5 million contribution to the university's general fund. Scott Stricklin has been Florida's athletic director since 2016.

== Awards and records ==
Men's sports	Women's sports
Baseball	Basketball
Basketball	Cross country
Cross country	Golf
Football	Gymnastics
Golf	Lacrosse
Swimming & diving	Soccer
Tennis	Softball
Track and field^{†}	Swimming & diving
	Tennis
	Track and field^{†}
	Volleyball
† – Track and field includes both indoor and outdoor.

Beginning in the early 1990s, the Florida Gators have been recognized as one of the premier athletic programs in the Southeastern Conference (SEC) and one of the best in the nation. The SEC has awarded an All-Sports Trophy to the best overall sports program in the conference since 1984, and Florida has won the award 28 times as of 2023. Florida is the only school in the SEC and one of four schools nationally to have won a national championship in football, men's basketball, and baseball. Every year since 1993, the National Association of Collegiate Directors of Athletics (NACDA) has recognized the Gators athletic program as one of the ten best overall Division I athletic programs in the country in its annual NACDA Directors' Cup standings, including as runners-up on four occasions. The men's athletic program was also the winner of the 2010–11 and 2011–12 Capital One Cup; the women's athletic program won the Capital One Cup in 2013–14, and both programs have placed in the top five in the standings on several other occasions.

Stylized script "Gators" logo, used on Gators football helmets

Among the Gators' recent national championships, the Florida Gators men's basketball team won the 2025 NCAA Division I men's basketball tournament for the third time with a 65–63 win over the Houston Cougars. This championship makes the University of Florida the first and only Division I school in history to win the Division I Championship three times each in both football and basketball. Also, the men's basketball team won the 2006 and 2007 NCAA Division I men's basketball tournaments, and the Florida Gators football team won 2007 BCS National Championship Game in football, all in 366 days. Florida is the only school in NCAA Division I history to hold the outright men's basketball and football championships during the same school year.

In January 2009, the Gators football team won the 2009 BCS National Championship Game with a 24–14 victory over the Oklahoma Sooners. The Florida Gators baseball team took home its first championship at the 2017 NCAA championship, defeating rival SEC foe the LSU Tigers in two games. The Gators won the NCAA men's indoor track and field championship in three consecutive seasons in 2010, 2011 and 2012, the NCAA women's swimming and diving team national championship in 2010, the NCAA women's tennis championship in 2011, 2012 and 2017, the NCAA men's outdoor track and field championship in 2012, 2013 and 2016, the NCAA women's gymnastics championship in 2013, 2014 and 2015, and the NCAA softball championships in 2014 and 2015. Individual Gator athletes have won 279 individual NCAA championships in boxing, golf, gymnastics, swimming and diving, tennis, and track and field. In 2017, Florida won the baseball national championship for the first time. The Gators swept LSU in the best of three national title series. This earned the university a total of 40 national team championships. Additionally, this put the University of Florida in exclusive company. With the 2017 baseball national championship, Florida became only the fourth school in history to win national championships in football, men's basketball, and baseball. Florida, along with Michigan, Ohio State, and UCLA are the only schools to ever achieve triple crown status. This also put Florida in a category by itself. Florida is the only Southeastern Conference school to accomplish this feat, as well, Florida is the only school in history to have achieved triple crown status in such a short span of time. Florida's first national championships in each of the big three sports (football, men's basketball, and baseball) were won in the span of just 21 years.

=== NCAA all-sports rankings ===
The University of Florida has been ranked among the nation's top ten NCAA Division I athletic programs every year since 1983–84, an overall ranking that includes both men's and women's sports – the only college sports program ranked in the top ten in the United States for the last 39 consecutive years. The National Association of Collegiate Directors of Athletics (NACDA) has recognized the University of Florida as ranking among the top seven Division I programs in its NACDA Directors' Cup standings every year since the NACDA and USA Today began awarding the cup in 1993–94. The 2022–23 academic year marked the Gators' 39th consecutive year ranked among the nation's top ten best overall collegiate athletic programs, and the twenty-second consecutive year ranked among the top seven Division I programs in the NACDA Directors' Cup standings. Only one other Division I athletic program has matched that feat, and Florida has achieved this record while fielding fewer sports teams than many of the other perennially top-ranked collegiate athletic programs. In the 29 years of the NACDA Directors' Cup, the Gators have finished fifth or better in 22 years, and have never finished lower than seventh; the only other program ranked among the top ten Division I programs every year since 1993–94 is the Stanford Cardinal sports program of Stanford University.

NCAA Division I all-sports rankings

Year	Rank
1983–84	5th
1984–85	4th
1985–86	8th
1986–87	4th
1987–88	5th
1988–89	9th
1989–90	5th
1990–91	5th

Year	Rank
1991–92	5th
1992–93	4th
1993–94	4th
1994–95	5th
1995–96	3rd
1996–97	5th
1997–98	2nd (tie)
1998–99	4th

Year	Rank
1999–00	7th
2000–01	7th
2001–02	3rd
2002–03	7th
2003–04	6th
2004–05	6th
2005–06	5th
2006–07	6th

Year	Rank
2007–08	6th
2008–09	3rd
2009–10	2nd
2010–11	4th
2011–12	2nd
2012–13	2nd
2013–14	2nd
2014–15	4th

Year	Rank
2015–16	5th
2016–17	3rd
2017–18	3rd
2018–19	3rd
2019–20	(Note: No rankings due to Covid-19)
2020–21	5th
2021–22	5th
2022–23	5th

Year	Rank
2023–24	4th

=== SEC All-Sports Trophy ===
Through the end of the 2022–23 school year, the Florida Gators have won 261 Southeastern Conference (SEC) team championships, the most in conference history.

The SEC All-Sports Trophy began in 1973 as the Bernie Moore Trophy and tabulated the league's best men's sports program. In 1983, the SEC also began recognizing the best women's sports program in the conference, as well as the best overall SEC sports program. In 1994, the New York Times Regional Newspaper Group assumed responsibility for awarding the trophies. In the 50-year history of the awards, Florida has won 24 women's trophies, 22 men's trophies, and 28 overall SEC All-Sports trophies.

SEC rival Georgia won the overall 2005–06 All-Sports Trophy to snap Florida's record streak at fourteen straight (1990–91 through 2004–05). Florida reclaimed the SEC All-Sports Trophy for the 2006–07 school year, and the Gators have held on to the overall all-sports trophies in every year until Texas A&M ended their streak in 2018–19. The Gators are the first of two SEC sports programs to earn the overall, men's, and women's all-sports trophies in a single year (the other being Tennessee in the 2022–23 season), and have swept all three trophies sixteen times.

=== Championships ===
==== NCAA team championships ====
In their history of intercollegiate competition, the University of Florida's varsity athletic teams have won 49 national championships (including 44 sponsored by the National Collegiate Athletic Association (NCAA), two by the Association for Intercollegiate Athletics for Women (AIAW), two by the Bowl Championship Series (BCS), and one by the Bowl Alliance). Florida is the only Division I school to hold both major men's championships (football and men's basketball) at the same time (as the 2006 BCS football champions and the 2006 and 2007 NCAA men's basketball champions), and was the first to do so. (Note: Oklahoma State (then-Oklahoma A&M) was retroactively awarded the 1945 football title by the American Football Coaches Association in 2016 and won the 1945 and 1946 NCAA men's basketball championships.)

Men's national championships (27)

- Baseball (1): 2017
- Basketball (3): 2006 • 2007 • 2025
- Football (3): 1996 • 2006 • 2008
- Golf (5): 1968 • 1973 • 1993 • 2001 • 2023
- Indoor track and field (5): 2010 • 2011 • 2012 • 2018 • 2019
- Outdoor track and field (7): 2012 • 2013 • 2016 • 2017 • 2022 • 2023 • 2024
- Swimming and diving (2): 1983 • 1984
- Tennis (1): 2021

Women's national championships (22)

- Golf (2): 1985 • 1986
- Gymnastics (4): 1982 • 2013 • 2014 • 2015
- Indoor track and field (2): 1992 • 2022
- Outdoor track and field (1): 2022
- Soccer (1): 1998
- Softball (2): 2014 • 2015
- Swimming and diving (3): 1979 • 1982 • 2010
- Tennis (7): 1992 • 1996 • 1998 • 2003 • 2011 • 2012 • 2017

All of the national championships listed above were sponsored by the NCAA other than football in 1996 (Bowl Alliance), football in 2006 and 2008 (BCS), women's gymnastics in 1982 (AIAW), and women's swimming and diving in 1979 (AIAW).

==== NCAA individual and relay championships ====
Athletes at UF have won 372 individual and relay NCAA national championships.

Men's individual and relay championships (157)

- Boxing: 1
- Golf: 3
- Swimming and diving: 74
- Tennis: 5
- Track and field: 84

Women's individual and relay championships (196)

- Cross Country: 1
- Golf: 1
- Gymnastics: 28
- Swimming and diving: 107
- Tennis: 9
- Track and field: 59

==== Conference championships ====
The University of Florida is a founding member of the Southeastern Conference (SEC), one of the nation's premier intercollegiate sports conferences, and 20 of the 21 Gators sports teams compete in the SEC. Since the SEC began play in 1933, Florida's varsity athletic teams have won 269 SEC team championships, more than any other conference member. The women's lacrosse team played its first four seasons in the now-defunct American Lacrosse Conference (ALC), followed by four seasons in the Big East Conference and six in the American Athletic Conference (AAC) before joining the Big 12 Conference for the 2025 season (2024–25 school year) and beyond. All of Florida's conference championships are from the SEC unless otherwise stated.

Men's conference championships

- Baseball (16): 1952 • 1956 • 1962 • 1981 • 1982 • 1984 • 1988 • 1996 • 1998 • 2005 • 2010 • 2011 • 2014 • 2017 • 2018 • 2023 • Tournament (7): 1981 • 1982 • 1984 • 1988 • 1991 • 2011 • 2015
- Basketball (8): 1989 • 2000 • 2001 • 2007 • 2011 • 2013 • 2014 • 2026 Tournament (5): 2005 • 2006 • 2007 • 2014 • 2025
- Cross country (3) 1955 • 1986 • 1987
- Football (8): 1991 • 1993 • 1994 • 1995 • 1996 • 2000 • 2006 • 2008
- Golf (17): 1955 • 1956 • 1968 • 1973 • 1974 • 1975 • 1985 • 1989 • 1991 • 1992 • 1993 • 1994 • 1999 • 2003 • 2011 • 2023 • 2025
- Swimming and diving (44): 1937 • 1938 • 1939 • 1940 • 1941 • 1953 • 1954 • 1956 • 1957 • 1958 • 1959 • 1960 • 1961 • 1962 • 1963 • 1964 • 1965 • 1966 • 1967 • 1968 • 1970 • 1971 • 1979 • 1980 • 1981 • 1983 • 1984 • 1985 • 1986 • 1990 • 1991 • 1992 • 1993 • 2013 • 2014 • 2015 • 2016 • 2017 • 2018 • 2019 • 2020 • 2021 • 2022 • 2023 • 2024
- Tennis (12): 1950 • 1961 • 1968 • 1969 • 1975 • 1994 • 2000 • 2003 • 2005 • 2019 • 2021 • 2022 • Tournament (6): 1994 • 2000 • 2005 • 2011 • 2016 • 2022
- Indoor track and field (8): 1975 • 1976 • 1987 • 1988 • 2004 • 2011 • 2015 • 2019
- Outdoor track and field (6): 1953 • 1956 • 1987 • 2010 • 2015 • 2018
- Wrestling† (1): 1975

Women's conference championships

- Cross country (8) 1984 • 1996 • 1997 • 2009 • 2010 • 2012 • 2023 • 2025 • 2026
- Golf (9): 1981 • 1982 • 1984 • 1986 • 1987 • 1991 • 1995 • 2008 • 2017
- Gymnastics (16): 1982 • 1983 • 1984 • 1985 • 1989 • 2007 • 2010 • 2012 • 2013 • 2016 • 2019 • 2020 • 2021 • 2022 • 2023 • 2026
- Lacrosse (13): 2011 (ALC) • 2012 (ALC) • 2013 (ALC) • 2014 (ALC) • 2015 (Big East) • 2016 (Big East) • 2017 (Big East) • 2018 (Big East) • 2019 (AAC) • 2021 (AAC)• 2022 (AAC) • 2024 (AAC) • 2025 (Big 12) • Tournament (11): 2012 (ALC) • 2014 (ALC) • 2015 (Big East) • 2016 (Big East) • 2017 (Big East) • 2018 (Big East) • 2019 (AAC) • 2021 (AAC) • 2022 (AAC) • 2023 (AAC) • 2024 (AAC) • 2025 (Big 12)
- Soccer (14): 1996 • 1997 • 1998 • 1999 • 2000 • 2001 • 2006 • 2007 • 2008 • 2009 • 2010 • 2012 • 2013 • 2015 • Tournament (12): 1996 • 1997 • 1998 • 1999 • 2000 • 2001 • 2004 • 2007 • 2010 • 2012 • 2015 • 2016
- Softball (9): 1998 • 2008 • 2009 • 2013 • 2015 • 2016 • 2017 • 2018 • 2021 • Tournament (5): 2008 • 2009 • 2013 • 2018 • 2019 • 2024
- Swimming and diving (19): 1981 • 1982 • 1983 • 1984 • 1986 • 1987 • 1988 • 1989 • 1990 • 1991 • 1992 • 1993 • 1994 • 1995 • 1996 • 2002 • 2009 • 2023 • 2024
- Tennis (29): 1980 • 1981 • 1982 • 1984 • 1985 • 1986 • 1987 • 1988 • 1990 • 1991 • 1992 • 1993 • 1995 • 1996 • 1997 • 1998 • 1999 • 2001 • 2003 • 2004 • 2006 • 2007 • 2008 • 2010 • 2011 • 2012 • 2013 • 2015 • 2016 • Tournament (20): 1982 • 1990 • 1991 • 1992 • 1993 • 1995 • 1996 • 1997 • 1998 • 2000 • 2002 • 2003 • 2004 • 2005 • 2006 • 2010 • 2011 • 2012 • 2013 • 2016
- Indoor track and field (9): 1990 • 1992 • 1997 • 2002 • 2004 • 2010 • 2012 • 2014 • 2026
- Outdoor track and field (7): 1992 • 1997 • 1998 • 2003 • 2009 • 2018 • 2022 • 2026
- Volleyball (25): 1991 • 1992 • 1993 • 1994 • 1995 • 1996 • 1997 • 1998 • 1999 • 2000 • 2001 • 2002 • 2003 • 2004 • 2005 • 2006 • 2007 • 2008 • 2010 • 2012 • 2014 • 2016 • 2017 • 2019 • 2022 • Tournament (12): 1992 • 1993 • 1994 • 1995 • 1996 • 1998 • 1999 • 2000 • 2001 • 2002 • 2003 • 2005

† Wrestling is no longer offered at the varsity level at UF since 1979.

For purposes of counting "official" SEC team championships in baseball, men's and women's basketball, soccer, softball, men's and women's tennis, and volleyball, the SEC currently only includes regular season team championships, not tournament championships. The Gators have won an additional 67 SEC tournament titles in these sports which are not included in Florida's total of 268 SEC team championships.

== Baseball ==
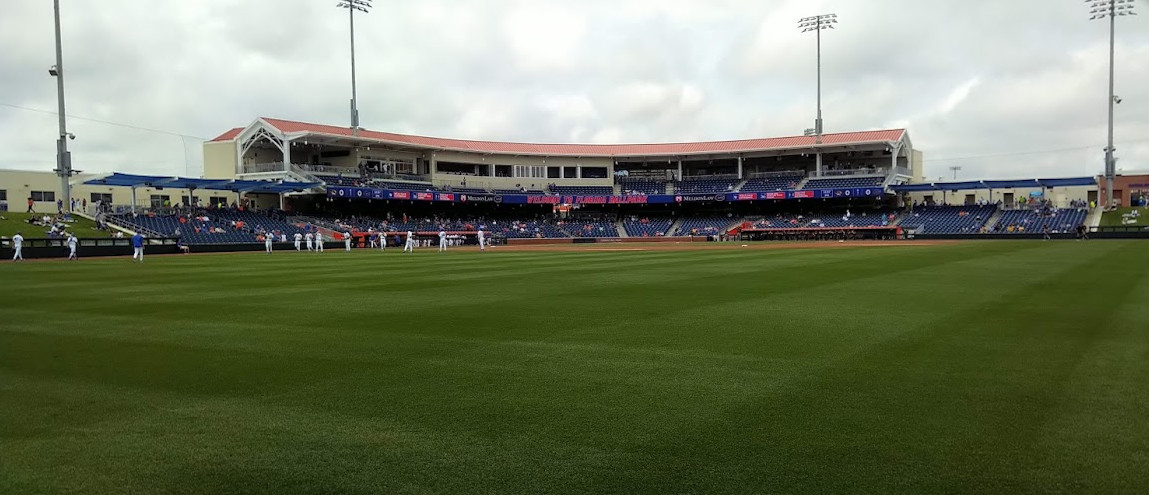
Condron Ballpark at McKethan Field

Coach Andy Lopez took over the Gators baseball program in 1994, one season after leading the Pepperdine Waves to their first College World Series championship. In 1996, he coached the Gators to a fifty-win season and a College World Series bid. By 2000, the program had seemingly hit a plateau and Lopez was replaced.

Pat McMahon became the Gators' head coach in 2001 after coaching the Mississippi State Bulldogs. The Gators' 2005 baseball season was the most successful to date, with the team winning the SEC title, and earning a place in the College World Series for the fifth time in school history. The team advanced to the championship round against the Texas Longhorns, ultimately losing two games to none.

Following their 2005 College World Series run, the Gators opened the 2006 season ranked number one in the polls, but struggled to finish 28–28 record (10–20 SEC), and failed to qualify for the NCAA Regionals. After missing the NCAA Regionals again in 2007, McMahon was dismissed.

Former Clemson Tigers associate head coach Kevin O'Sullivan became the Gators' new head baseball coach on June 13, 2007. O'Sullivan's Gator teams showed immediate improvement and the Gators finished the 2008 regular season with a 30–24 record (17–13 SEC), and received an invitation to the NCAA Regional in Tallahassee. The 2009 squad finished the regular season with a 38–18 record (19–11 SEC), won the NCAA Regional in Gainesville, and advanced to the Super Regional before losing to the Southern Mississippi Golden Eagles.

O'Sullivan's 2010 and 2011 Gators finished their SEC regular season play with identical 22–8 records, won the program's eleventh and twelfth SEC championships, earned a berth in the College World Series in both years, and advanced to the College World Series final in 2011 before getting swept by SEC foe South Carolina in two games.

The Gators returned to the College World Series in 2012, 2015, 2016, 2017, 2018, 2023, and 2024. In June 2017, Florida won their first College World Series championship, sweeping fellow SEC rival LSU in two games in the best-of-three finals. In the CWS championship rematch six years later, the Gators, though they set a new program record with 54 wins, lose to the Tigers in three games.

Since 2021, the Gators baseball team plays its home games at Condron Ballpark at Alfred A. McKethan Field.

== Men's basketball ==
Florida enjoyed limited success in men's basketball before the mid-1980s. Coach Norm Sloan's Gators were invited to the National Invitation tournament (NIT)—only the second time the team had been invited to a post-season tournament. They returned to the NIT in 1985 and 1986, and made their first appearance in the NCAA basketball tournament in 1987, when guard Vernon Maxwell led the team to the NCAA Sweet Sixteen. The Gators received invitations to the NCAA tournament in 1988 and 1989, but Sloan was forced to resign at the outset of the 1989–90 season as a result of NCAA infractions.

Coach Lon Kruger brought renewed success, and his Gators reached the NIT final four in 1991–92. During the 1993–94 season, Andrew DeClercq and Dametri Hill led the Gators to their first NCAA tournament Final Four following a dramatic overtime victory over the Connecticut Huskies in the NCAA regional semifinal, and a 74–66 win over Boston College in the NCAA Regional Final.

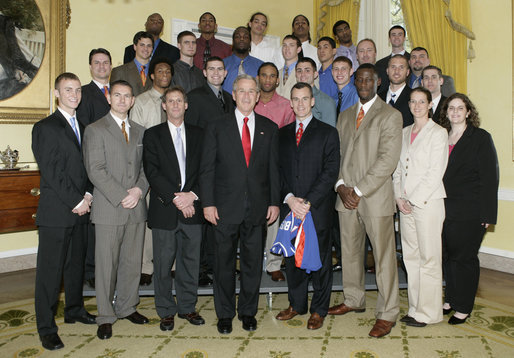
The 2005–06 national champion Gators met with President George W. Bush at the White House.

Athletic Director Jeremy Foley hired Billy Donovan as Kruger's replacement in 1996. Donovan's recruiting prowess was evident early, as he landed recruiting classes with future NBA players Mike Miller, Udonis Haslem and Matt Bonner. Donovan's Gators advanced to the NCAA tournament final before losing to the Michigan State Spartans in 2000, and demonstrated a consistency previously unknown to the program as they received invitations to the NCAA tournament every year from 1999 through 2007, a team-record eight-year streak.

Under Donovan, Florida won its first SEC men's basketball tournament in 2005, when they beat the Kentucky Wildcats in the SEC title game.

The 2005–06 team's 17–0 start was the best in team history, surprising many with a young, selfless squad led by four sophomores. The team began the season unranked, but won its second consecutive SEC Tournament championship. On April 3, 2006, the Gators defeated the UCLA Bruins 73–57 in the NCAA tournament championship game to win Florida's first men's national basketball championship. Within days, all five starters announced they would return for another season to try to win back-to-back championships.

At the outset of the 2006–07 season, the Gators were ranked No. 1 in both major polls for the first time. The Gators won their second consecutive NCAA national men's basketball championship on April 2, 2007, defeating the Ohio State Buckeyes 84–75. They became the first team since Duke in 1991–92 to win back-to-back tournaments and the first in NCAA history to do so with the same starting line-up. Afterward, Florida's four-star juniors—Joakim Noah, Al Horford, Taurean Green, and Corey Brewer—announced their decision to enter the NBA draft.

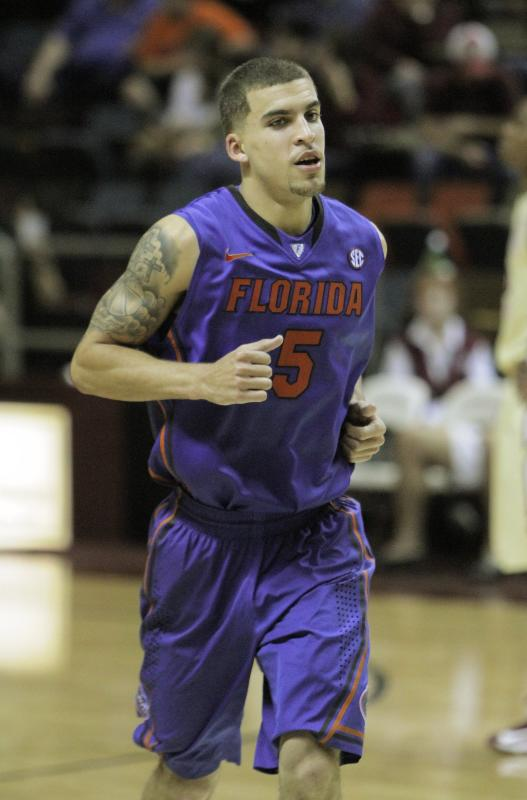
Scottie Wilbekin played for the men's basketball team from 2010 to 2014.

Donovan's Gators returned to championship form in 2010–11, winning the program's fifth regular season SEC championship and fighting their way to the NCAA regional semifinals (the "Elite Eight") before losing 74–71 to the Butler Bulldogs in overtime. In 2011–12, the Gators received a No. 7 seed in the NCAA tournament, exceeded expectations, and advanced to the Elite Eight, headlined by the play of star freshman Bradley Beal and point guard Erving Walker, before falling to Louisville. During the 2013–14 season, the Gators were ranked No. 1 in the nation, won the SEC championship with 36 straight wins during the regular season and tournament games, went on a school-record 30 game winning streak, and advanced to the NCAA Final Four, headlined by the play of four senior veterans: Patric Young, Scottie Wilbekin, Will Yeguete and Casey Prather.

Donovan left at the end of the 2014-2015 to take the head coaching job for the Oklahoma City Thunder. That season, the Gators went 16-17, earning their first losing record in 17 seasons. Louisiana Tech head coach Mike White was then hired on, and during his eight-year tenure, the Gators appeared in the NCAA tournament four times, including an Elite Eight appearance in 2017. However, at the end of the 2021-2022 season, White left to become the head coach at Georgia.

On March 18th, 2022, San Francisco head coach Todd Golden was hired to lead the team. Although the Gators missed the NCAA tournament in 2023, falling in the first round of the NIT, Golden led the Gators to the championship game of the 2024 SEC tournament, where the Gators lost to Auburn, before losing in the first round of the 2024 NCAA tournament to Colorado, 102-100.

The 2024-2025 season started with the Gators being ranked No. 21 in preseason polls. The Gators went undefeated in non-conference play, winning 13 straight games as well as the ESPN Events Invitational, and started conference play being ranked No. 6 in the country. The Gators ended up suffering all four of their season losses in conference play, falling to Kentucky, Missouri, Tennessee, and Georgia respectively. Entering the 2025 SEC tournament as the two-seed, they beat Missouri, Alabama, and Tennessee to win their first tournament title since 2014. The Gators were seeded as a number one seed (fourth overall) in the West region of the NCAA tournament. They beat Norfolk State in the First Round and the defending back-to-back champions UConn in the Second Round, giving the Huskies their first NCAA tournament loss in three years. They bested Maryland in the Sweet Sixteen and came back from a nine-point deficit with three minutes left to defeat Texas Tech in the Elite Eight, earning their first Final Four bid since 2014. Another come-from-behind win against No. 1 overall seed Auburn granted Florida their first title berth since 2007, where they defeated Houston 65–63 for their third title.

== Women's basketball ==
Women's basketball was approved as a new women's varsity sport by Florida in March 1972, but began play in 1973 as a club team. In 1975, the Lady Gators debuted as a varsity program under head coach Dr. Paula Welch. The Gators made local headlines in 1976 by winning the "state championship", beating the other three women's college teams located in the state at that time.

While traditionally being overshadowed by conference and national basketball powers Tennessee and Georgia, the Lady Gators have made several NCAA tournament appearances and sent players to the WNBA, including DeLisha Milton-Jones. Carol Ross compiled more wins than any other women's basketball coach in Florida's history, and guided the team for twelve seasons from 1991 to 2003, but left to accept the head coaching job at her alma mater, Ole Miss.

From 2002 through 2006, the women's basketball team was coached by Carolyn Peck, a former WNBA coach who won a national title with Purdue. Peck was fired midway through the 2006 season (though allowed to finish the season) after enduring the worst losing streak of any Gator sport.

Former Gator player and previous Charlotte coach Amanda Butler was named the new women's basketball coach on April 13, 2007. During the 2008–09 season, the Lady Gators received an NCAA tournament bid and won a first-round game before being defeated by eventual tournament champion Connecticut in the second round. Butler resigned after the 2016–17 season.

The Gators women's basketball team is currently coached by Kelly Rae Finley and plays its home games in the O'Connell Center.

== Cross country ==
The Florida Gators men's cross country team has won three Southeastern Conference championships (SEC), and has competed in ten National Collegiate Athletic Association (NCAA) tournaments. The highest they've placed is 6th in 1990. The women's cross country team has won eight SEC Championships and competed in fifteen NCAA tournaments. The highest they've placed is 5th in 2023.

Four men have won individual cross country SEC championships: Don Gagon (1955), Frank Lagotic (1967), Keith Brantly (1983), and Kelvin Cheruiyot (2025). Six women have won individual cross country SEC championships: Tricia Clifford (1984), Shelly Steely (1986), Becki Wells (1995, 1996), Rebecca Lowe (2009), Jessica Pasco (2019), and Parker Valby (2022, 2023).

In 2023, Parker Valby was the first Florida Gator to win both the SEC and NCAA individual cross country championship

Coach Mike Holloway is the head coach of the men's and women's cross country teams.

== Football ==
The University of Florida fielded an official varsity football team for the first time in 1906, defeating the Gainesville Athletic Club 6–0 in its first game. Since then, the Gators have played in thirty-seven bowl games, won three national championships (1996, 2006, 2008) and eight Southeastern Conference championships, and produced 138 All-Americans, forty-two National Football League (NFL) first-round draft choices and three Heisman Trophy winners.

The Gators' most prominent current football rivals are SEC Eastern Division foes Georgia and Tennessee, annual SEC Western Division opponent LSU, and in-state rival Florida State from the Atlantic Coast Conference (ACC). Florida has historically shared rivalries with Auburn and Miami, too, but those games are no longer played annually and have lessened in intensity.

Since 1990, when Heisman Trophy-winning quarterback Steve Spurrier returned to his alma mater as head coach, the Gator football team has won more games than any other program in the NCAA's Football Bowl Subdivision (FBS). The 1996 team, coached by Spurrier and led by another Gator Heisman-winner, Danny Wuerffel, finished with a 12–1 record and won the national championship in the Sugar Bowl, beating rival Florida State 52–20. This win was not without controversy from FSU fans who thought they should not have had to play Florida again. FSU won in the regular season match up 24–21.

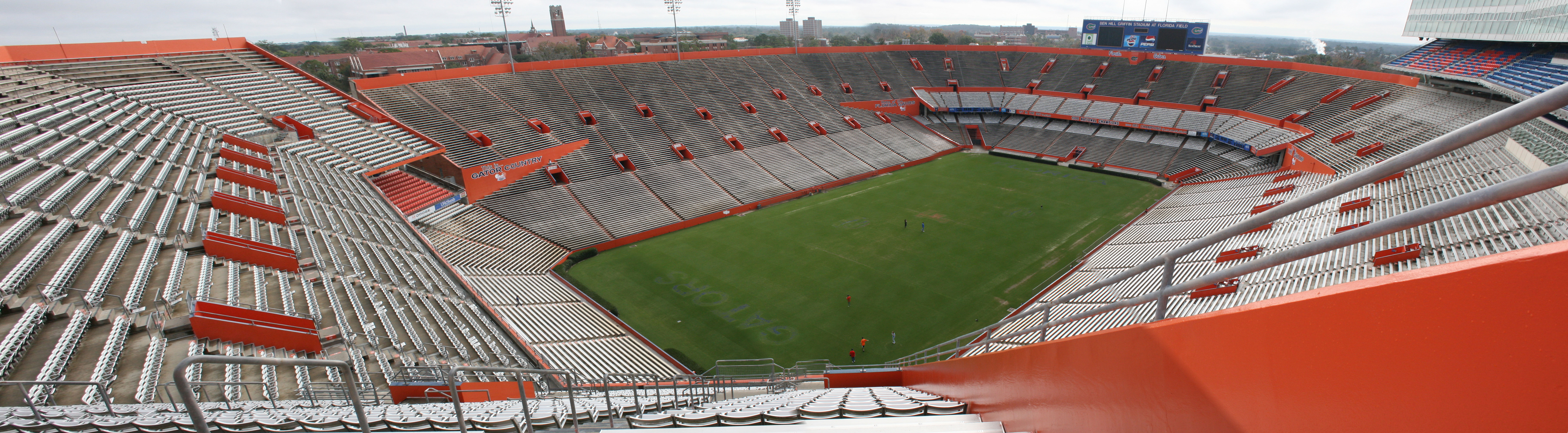
Steve Spurrier-Florida Field at Ben Hill Griffin Stadium, home field of the Gators

Urban Meyer became Florida's head football coach in December 2004, and his six teams had great success from 2005 to 2010. The 2006 team won the school's second national championship on January 8, 2007, defeating the number one-ranked Ohio State Buckeyes 41–14. Quarterback Tim Tebow won the Heisman Trophy in 2007, and Florida's Tebow-led 2008 team won the 2009 BCS National Championship Game on January 8, 2009, beating the top-ranked Oklahoma Sooners 24–14, for the Gators' third national championship.

The Gators have won the SEC Championship Game seven times in eleven appearances since the SEC instituted the championship game in 1992. The Gators won their first official conference title in 1991, the year before the first SEC conference championship game was played, for a total of eight SEC championships in the last twenty-four seasons.

The Gators football team plays its home games in Steve Spurrier-Florida Field at Ben Hill Griffin Stadium, more popularly known as The Swamp, the team's home field since 1930. Billy Gonzales is the current interim head coach of the Florida Gators football team.

== Men's golf ==
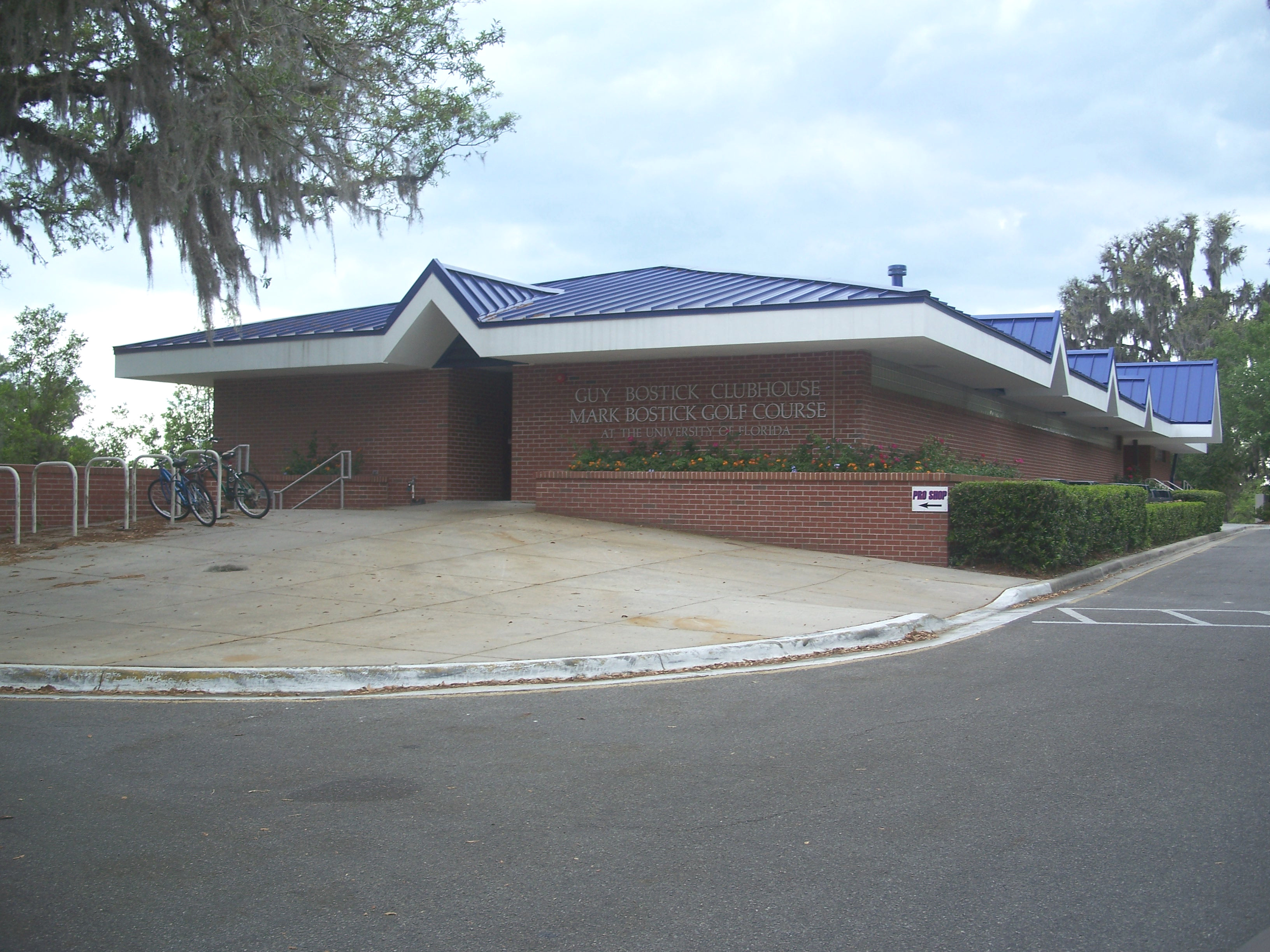
Guy Bostick Clubhouse

The men's golf team has won five NCAA Championships (1968, 1973, 1993, 2001, 2023), and has produced three individual NCAA champions, Bob Murphy in 1966, Nick Gilliam in 2001, and Fred Biondi in 2023. The men's golf team has also won sixteen Southeastern Conference (SEC) championships: 1955–56, 1968, 1973–75, 1985, 1989, 1991–94, 1999, 2003, 2011, 2023.

Numerous former Gator golfers have represented the University of Florida on the PGA Tour, and the program has produced over thirty male athletes who have competed professionally.

Buddy Alexander, the long-time head coach for the men's golf team, retired after the 2013–14 season. J. C. Deacon was hired in June 2014, and the 2022–23 season was his ninth. The Gators men's golf team plays its home matches at the Mark Bostick Golf Course (formerly known as the "University Golf Course").

== Women's golf ==
The women's golf team has won two NCAA team championships (1985, 1986), and has produced one individual NCAA champion, Page Dunlap. The women's golf team has also won eight Southeastern Conference (SEC) championships.

Former Lady Gator golfers have regularly represented the University of Florida on the LPGA Tour, and the program has produced over twenty female athletes who have competed in the professional ranks.

Emily Glaser is the head coach for the women's team. The Gators women's golf team plays its home matches at the Mark Bostick Golf Course (formerly known as the "University Golf Course").

== Women's gymnastics ==
Gymnastics was one of the first women's sports added at the University of Florida and achieved early success by winning the 1982 AIAW national championship. Since the NCAA assumed sponsorship of the national gymnastics championships in 1982, Florida has typically earned invitations to the NCAA national championships (top twelve teams nationally), and advanced to the NCAA "Super Six" eighteen times. Florida won the 2013, 2014 and 2015 NCAA national championships, finished in second-place in 1998 and 2012, and the team has only failed to qualify for the NCAA championships once in the past thirty-three seasons.

The Gators have won a total of nine SEC gymnastics championships since 1982. The team's biggest SEC rivals are Alabama and Georgia, both of which are also perennial national contenders. Coach Rhonda Faehn's Gator gymnasts were the SEC champions in both 2012 and 2013, and won the NCAA national team championships in 2013, 2014 and 2015 (the 2014 was as co-champions with Oklahoma).

Faehn coached the Gators gymnastics team from 2003 to 2015. Under Faehn, the Gator gymnasts had finished in the top seven every year and have won three NCAA national championships.

The Gators gymnastics team is now coached by Jenny Rowland. The Gators hold their home meets at the O'Connell Center.

== Women's lacrosse ==
In June 2006, the University Athletic Association announced the creation of the new Gators women's lacrosse program, citing the growth of high school lacrosse across the country and the increased availability of Division I competition. Florida became the second Southeastern Conference member university to offer lacrosse as a varsity sport, following Vanderbilt University, and played its inaugural 2010 season in the American Lacrosse Conference (ALC) together with the Commodores. The Gators and Commodores continued to play in the ALC until conference realignment led to the demise of the ALC following the 2014 season, after which both programs became single-sport members of the Big East Conference. The Gators and Commodores played in the Big East through the 2018 season, after which they became charter members of the new women's lacrosse league of the American Athletic Conference (The American). After the 2024 season, the Gators left The American to become inaugural members of Big 12 Conference women's lacrosse. The lacrosse team is the only Gators team that does not compete in the SEC.

The Gators lacrosse team has had success from its establishment, including four ALC regular-season championships (2011–2014); two ALC tournament titles (2012, 2014); both regular-season and tournament titles in all of its four Big East seasons (2015–2018); the regular-season and tournament championships in four of its five completed seasons (Note: The 2020 lacrosse season was started but not completed due to COVID-19.) as a member of The American (2019, 2021, 2022, 2024); the regular-season and tournament championships in 2025 as a member of the Big 12; eight appearances in the NCAA tournament national quarterfinals ("Elite Eight"); and three appearances in the NCAA tournament national semifinals ("Final Four") in 2012, 2024, and 2025.

Amanda O'Leary is the Gators' head coach. Before she was named to jump-start Florida's new program, O'Leary was the head coach at Yale University for 14 seasons, and was honored as a two-time All-American midfielder at Temple University, where she led her team to an NCAA championship in 1988.

In only the second season of the Gators lacrosse program, the mostly-sophomores team defeated the defending ALC champion Northwestern Wildcats to win their first regular season conference championship. The Gators completed a perfect 5–0 season three days later by defeating the Vanderbilt Commodores in Nashville.

The Gators women's lacrosse team plays its home games in the 1,500-seat Donald R. Dizney Stadium.

== Women's soccer ==
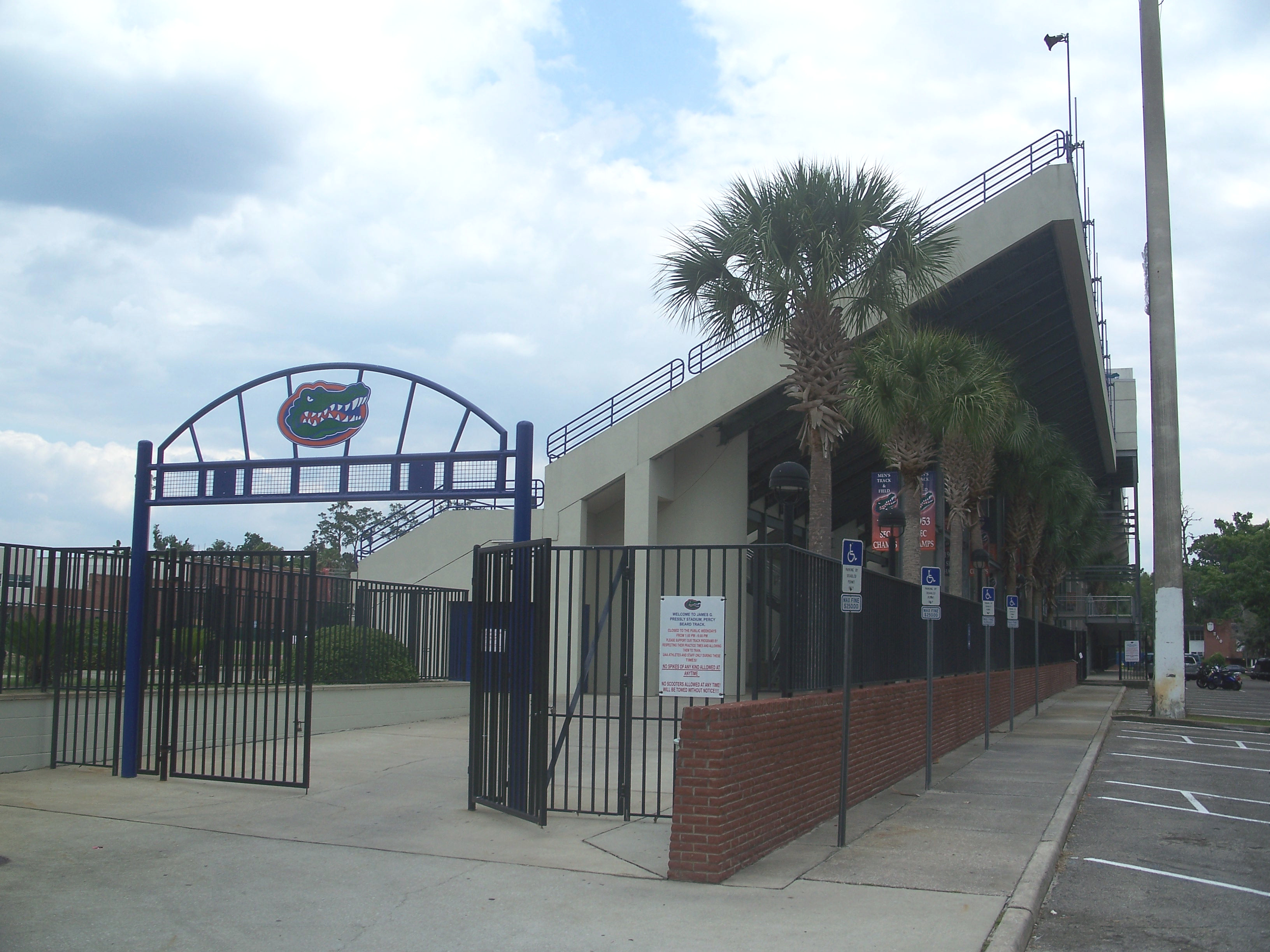
James G. Pressly Stadium

Becky Burleigh was hired to be the first head coach since the women's soccer team began play a varsity sport in 1995. Under Burleigh's leadership, the team quickly became a national contender. In 1998, in the program's fourth season, the Gators won their only NCAA national championship by defeating the defending national champion North Carolina Tar Heels 1–0 in the national finals of the NCAA tournament. The women's soccer team has also won thirteen Southeastern Conference regular season championships and ten SEC tournament titles in its eighteen seasons of play. In 2021, Burleigh retired as women's soccer coach.

Notable former Gator soccer players include Abby Wambach, who was a member of the U.S. women's national team and scored the game-winning goal in the final game of the 2004 Olympic Games in Athens, Greece; Heather Mitts, who played for the gold medal U.S. national team in the 2008 Olympics in Beijing, China; Melanie Booth, who currently plays for the Canadian women's national soccer team; and Danielle Fotopoulos, who played professionally with the Carolina Courage. Savannah Jordan plays for the Portland Thorns and ranks second in Gators history behind Wambach for goals scored.

The Gators women's soccer team is coached by Samantha Bohon and rotates most of its home games between James G. Pressly Stadium and Donald R. Dizney Stadium.

== Softball ==
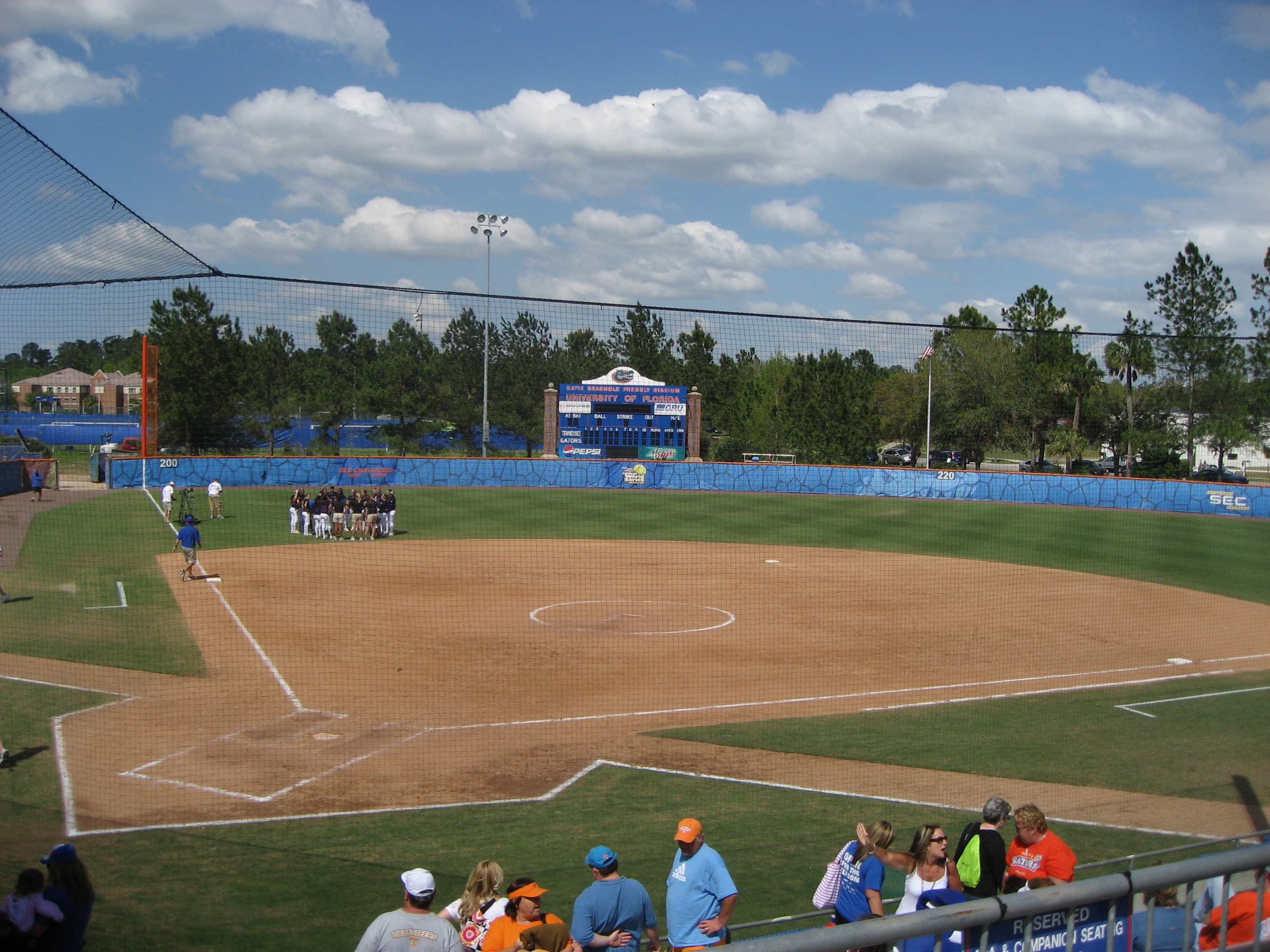
Pressly Softball Stadium, home field of the Gators softball team

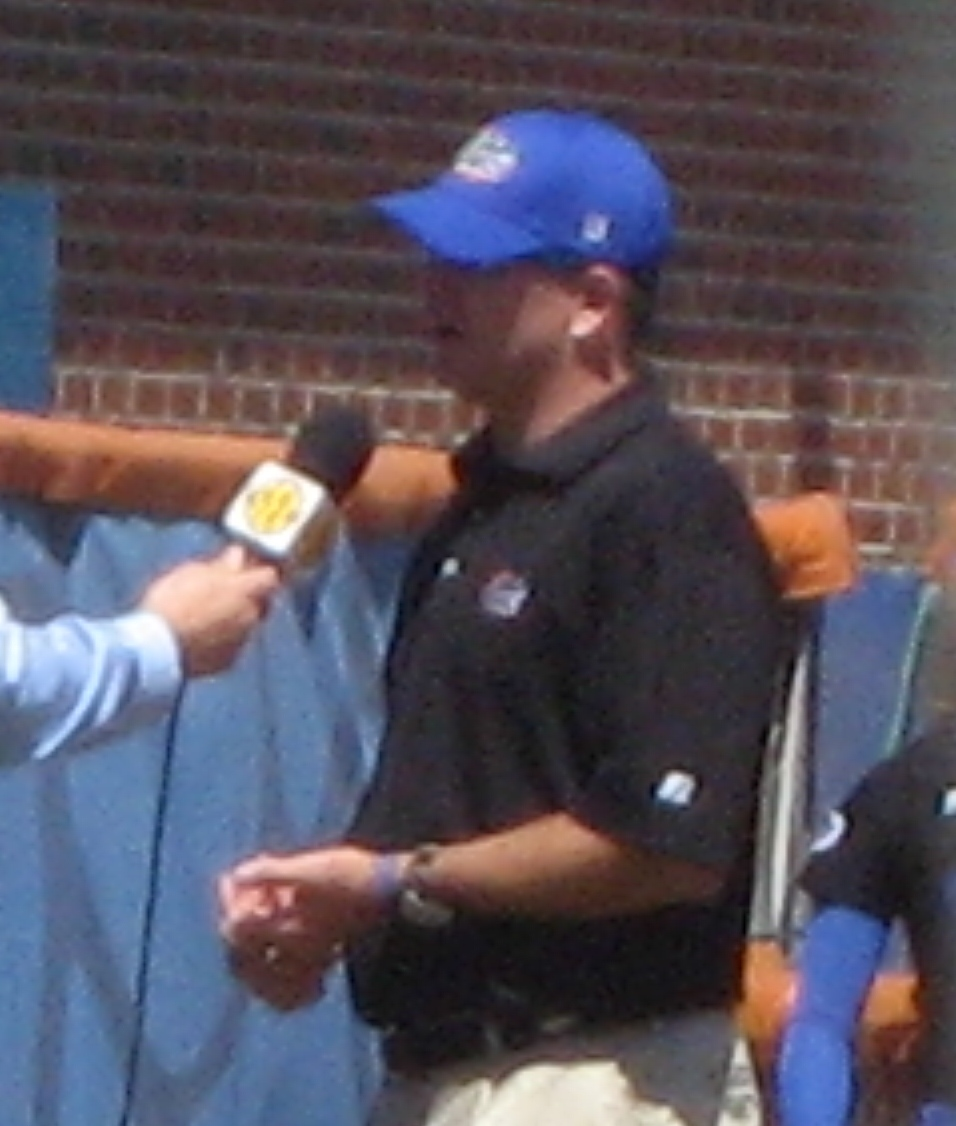
Tim Walton

The University Athletic Association decided to create the women's varsity softball program in 1995, and the Florida Gators softball team officially started competing in the Southeastern Conference in 1997 under former head coach Larry Ray. Since the beginning of the program, the Florida Gators have had several notable successes, including four SEC championships, 12 appearances in the Women's College World Series (2008, 2009, 2010, 2011, 2013, 2014, 2015, 2017, 2018, 2019, 2022, and 2024), and back-to-back WCWS national championships (2014 & 2015).

The Gators won nine SEC regular season championships (1998, 2008, 2009, 2013, 2016, 2017, 2018, and 2021), as well as six SEC tournament titles (2008, 2009, 2013, 2018, 2019, and 2024). In 2009, they played for the NCAA softball championship in the Women's College World Series, losing to the Washington Huskies in the final round. The Gators again advanced to the finals of the 2011 Women's College World Series before falling to the Arizona State Sun Devils. In 2014, the Gators defeated the Alabama Crimson Tide in the first two games of the three-game Women's College World Series to win their first NCAA national championship. In 2015, the Gators repeated as national champions by defeating the Michigan Wolverines in the full three games. The Gators would return to the WCWS finals in 2017 before losing to the Oklahoma Sooners in two games.

The current head coach is Tim Walton; the 2023–2024 season was his 18th as the Gators' coach. He was previously the head coach at Wichita State University and he played baseball for the University of Oklahoma and a minor league team affiliated with the Philadelphia Phillies. Through the end of the 2023 season, Walton has acquired a 926–223 (.806) record, while at Florida. Following the conclusion of the 2018 season, Walton was given a 10-year contract extension.

The Gators softball team plays its home games at the Katie Seashole Pressly Softball Stadium.

== Swimming and diving ==
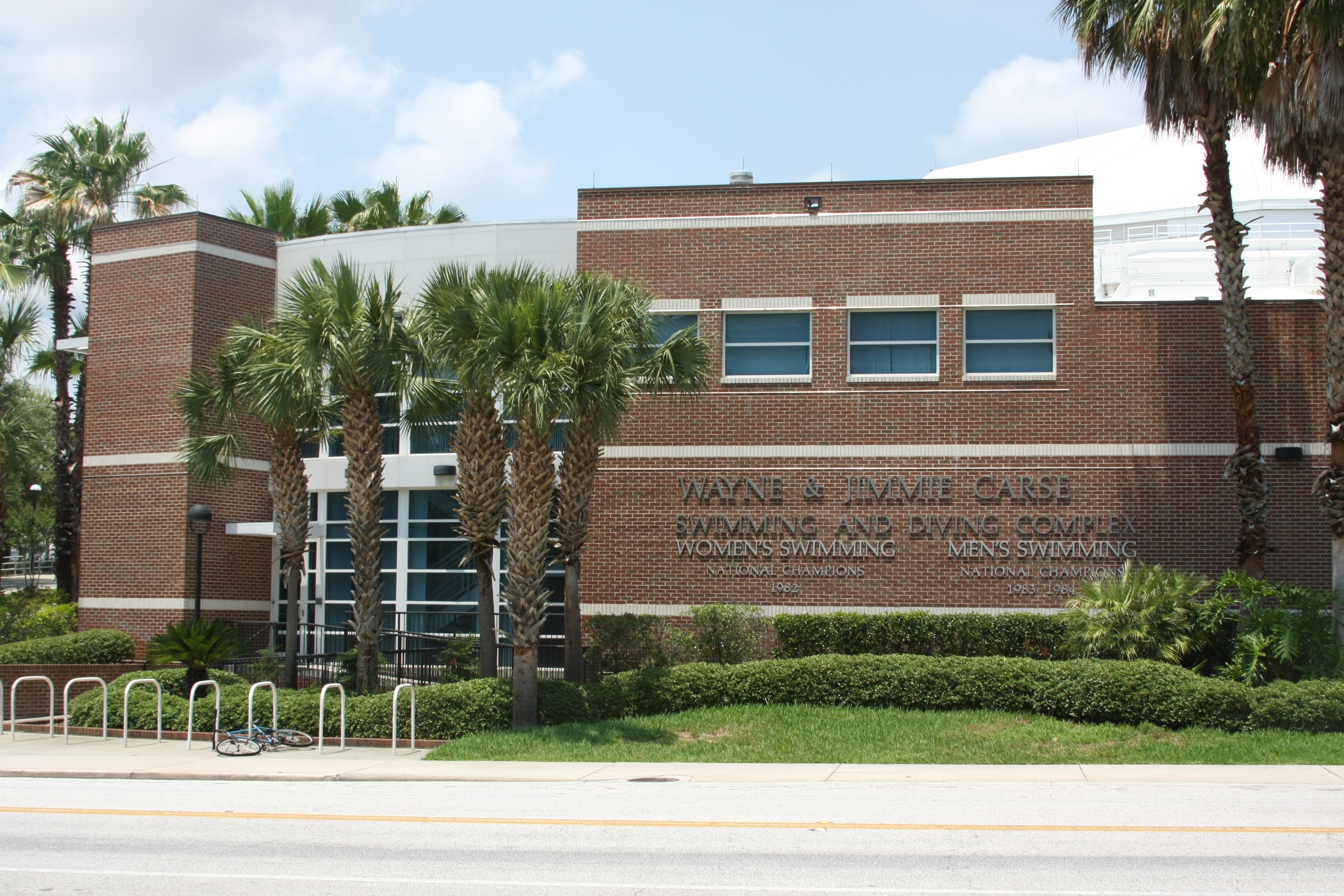
Carse Swimming Complex

The Florida Gators men's swimming and diving teams have won NCAA national championships in 1983 and 1984, and has also won 41 Southeastern Conference team championships – including a stretch of 13 straight from 1956 to 1968. The women's swimming and diving team has won AIAW and NCAA national championships in 1979, 1982 and 2010, and has also won seventeen SEC team championships.

The Florida Gators' notable female swimmers include three-time Olympic gold medalist Tracy Caulkins, three-time Olympic gold medalist Nicole Haislett, and four-time Olympic gold medalist Dara Torres, who is also the first American swimmer to compete in five Olympic Games. The Gators' notable male swimmers include Olympic gold medalists Matt Cetlinski, Mike Heath, David Larson, Ryan Lochte, Caeleb Dressel, Anthony Nesty and Martin Zubero.

The Gators have had an international flavor since the 1980s, when the Olympic success of Gator swimmers began to attract Canadian, European and Latin American swimmers to train under coach Randy Reese. That tradition continued under Gregg Troy, the head coach of the Gators men's and women's swimming teams. Troy served as the head coach of the U.S. Olympic men's swim team in 2012. Dale Schultz is the new head coach of the men's and women's diving teams, succeeding long-time coach Donnie Craine in 2014.

The Gators swimming and diving teams hold their home meets at the O'Connell Center Natatorium and train in the Carse Swimming Complex.

== Tennis ==
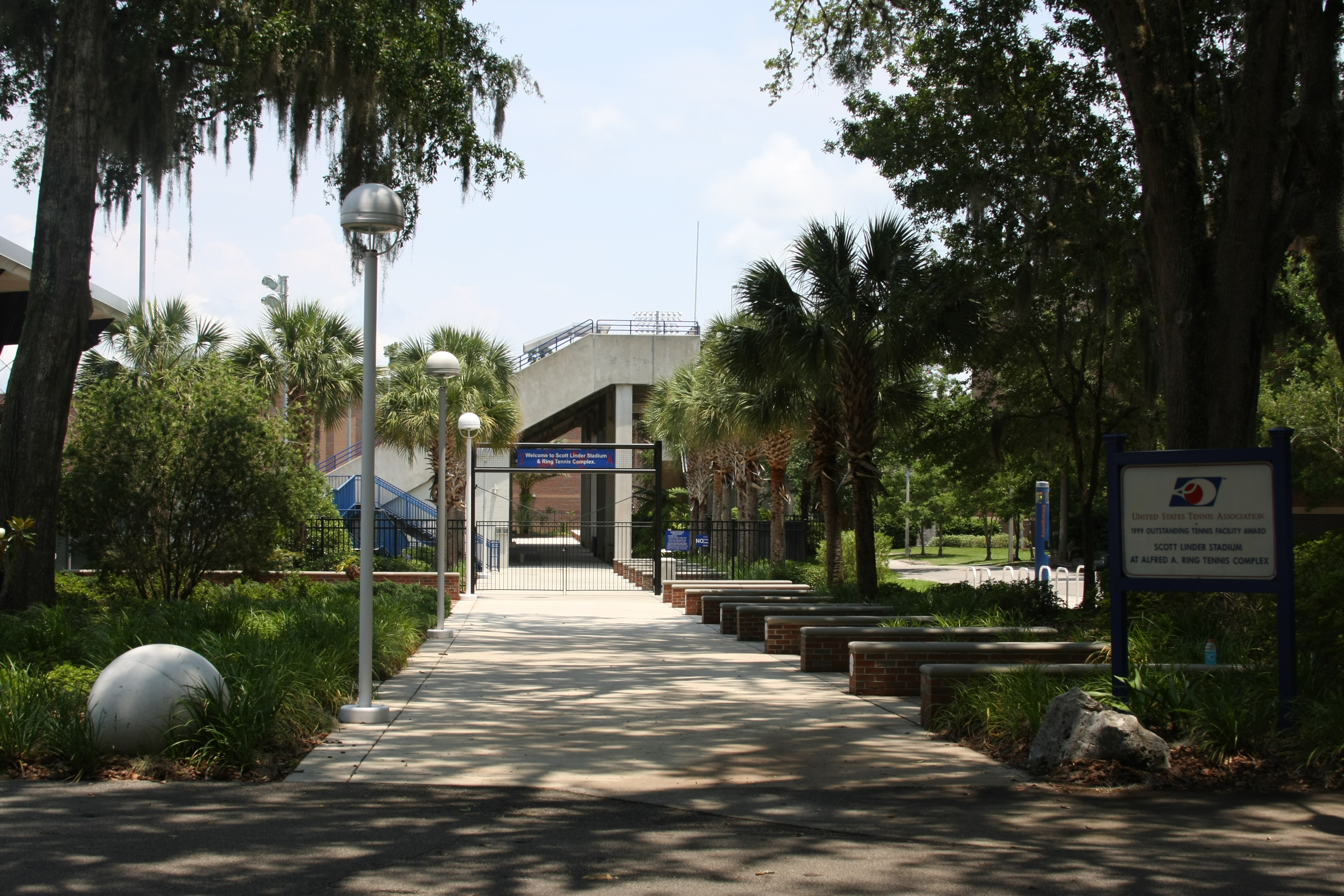
Ring Tennis Complex

The Florida Gators have one of the strongest and most storied women's tennis programs in NCAA history, and the women's tennis team has won seven NCAA team championships (1992, 1996, 1998, 2003, 2011, 2012, 2017). The team has also produced three individual Gators who have won four NCAA singles championships: Shaun Stafford (1988), Lisa Raymond (1992, 1993), and Jill Craybas (1996). In NCAA championship doubles play, four Gators doubles pairs have won five NCAA doubles championships: Jillian Alexander and Nicole Arendt (1991); Dawn Buth and Stephanie Nickitas (1996, 1997); Whitney Laiho and Jessica Lehnhoff (2001); and Brooke Austin and Kourtney Keegan (2016). The Gator women have also won seven Intercollegiate Tennis Association (ITA) national indoor championships (1988, 1991, 1992, 1996, 1997, 1999, 2017), and twenty-nine SEC team championships. The Gators have also claimed six SEC Tournament titles (1994, 2000, 2005, 2011, 2016, and 2022) in Men's Tennis and 20 in Women's Tennis (1982, 1990, 1991, 1992, 1993, 1995, 1996, 1997, 1998, 2000, 2002, 2003, 2004, 2005, 2006, 2010, 2011, 2012, 2013, and 2016).

The Gators men's tennis team has a winning tradition and has won 12 Southeastern Conference team championships as of 2022. In 2021, the men's tennis program won its first-ever NCAA team championship. The Gator men have also produced four NCAA singles champions: Mark Merklein (1993), Jeff Morrison (1999), Sam Riffice (2021), and Ben Shelton (2022). Merklein and partner David Blair combined to win an NCAA doubles championship (1994).

Adam Steinberg is the head coach of the men's tennis team, and coach Roland Thornqvist leads the women's tennis team. The Florida Gators tennis teams play their home matches at Linder Stadium at the Ring Tennis Complex on the university's campus.

== Track and field ==
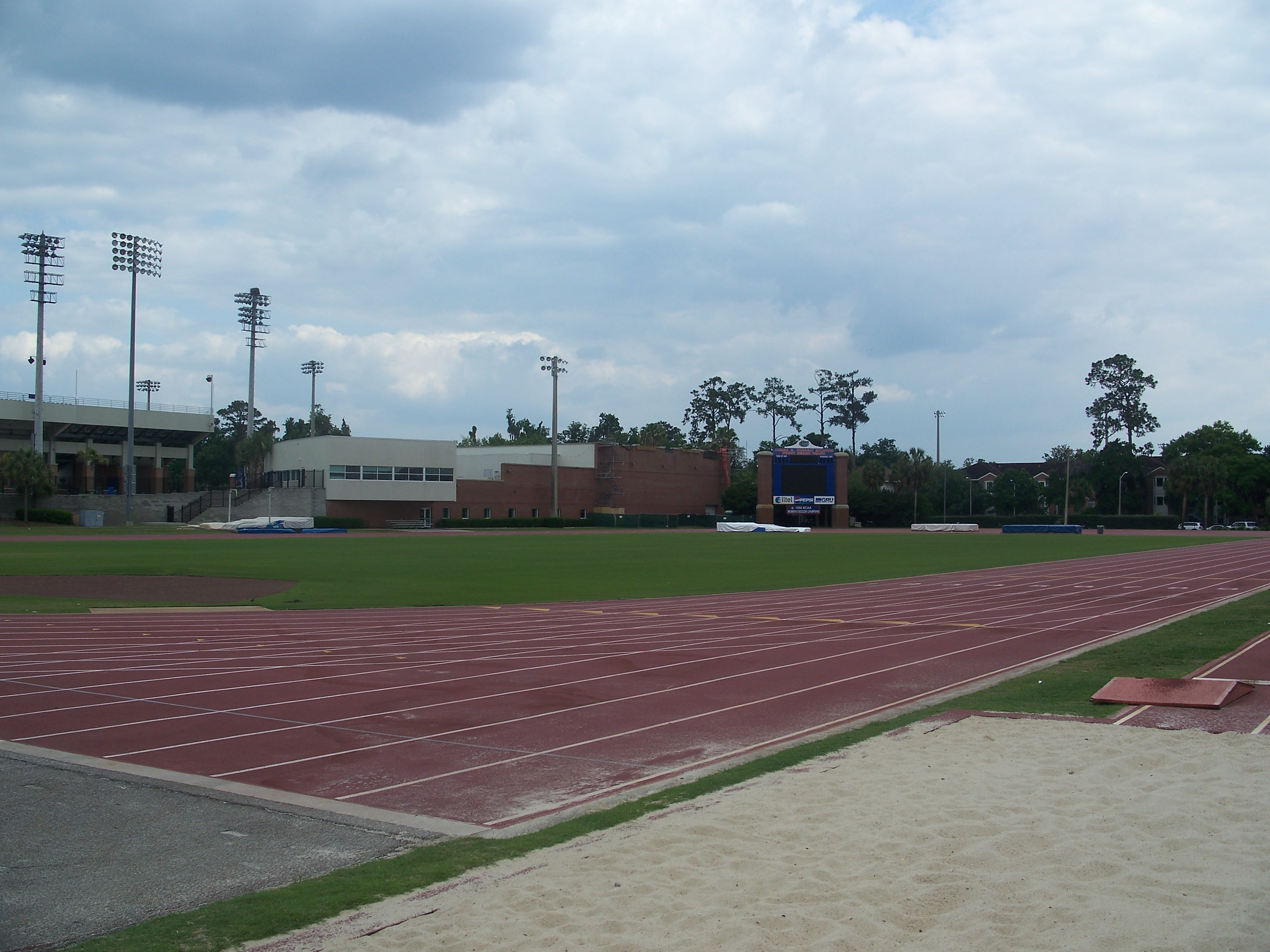
Percy Beard Track

The Florida Gators men's track and field team has won six Southeastern Conference indoor championships, and four SEC outdoor championships. After finishing as the runner-up in both the NCAA indoor and outdoor meets in 2009, the men's team went on to win three consecutive NCAA indoor titles (2010-2012) and its first NCAA outdoor title (2012) over the next three years. The men's team then went on their own "three-peat" of NCAA outdoor titles in 2022, 2023, and 2024.

The women's track and field team won the NCAA indoor championships in 1992 and 2022. The women's team won its first NCAA outdoor title in 2022. In addition, the women's team has won six SEC indoor championships, and four SEC outdoor championships.

The head coach for the track and field program is Mike Holloway, and he is responsible for both the men's and women's teams. The assistant coaches are Will Palmer, Eric Werskey, Nic Petersen, and Mellanee Welty.

The Gators men's and women's track and field teams hold their outdoor home meets at Percy Beard Track, which is part of James G. Pressly Stadium.

== Volleyball ==
The Gators began competing in women's volleyball in 1984 under coach Marilyn McReavy but did not become nationally competitive until coach Mary Wise assumed control of Florida's program in 1991. During her 30 seasons as Florida's head coach, Wise has compiled a 979–168 win–loss record (.854), and her Gators teams have won nineteen SEC regular season titles and twelve SEC Tournament titles in her twenty seasons. The Gators have made nineteen trips to the NCAA tournament, including eight NCAA Final Four appearances (1992, 1993, 1996, 1997, 1998, 2002, 2003, 2017). In 2003 and 2017, they advanced to the NCAA national championship final, where they lost to the USC Trojans and Nebraska Cornhuskers, respectively.

Florida landed the nation's top 2008 recruiting class, as ranked by Prepvolleyball.com and Volleyball Magazine, and signed the nation's top recruit and Gatorade National Player of the Year, Kelly Murphy, as well as four other recruits ranked among the top fifty. Murphy garnered First-Team All SEC and a spot on the SEC All-Freshman Team with fellow Gators Colleen Ward and Kristy Jaeckel. Murphy would also gain the SEC Freshman of the Year, AVCA All-South Region Freshman of the Year, the AVCA National Freshman of the Year, and Volleyball Magazine's Freshman of the Year. She was also honored as an AVCA Third-Team All-American and a Volleyball Magazine Second-Team All-American.

The Gators volleyball team plays its home matches in the O'Connell Center.

== Former varsity sports ==
In the past, the Florida Gators fielded varsity teams in men's boxing and men's wrestling. Gator boxer John Joca, a "Gator Great" member of the University of Florida Athletic Hall of Fame, won the NCAA national boxing championship in the 135-pound weight class in 1940. The Gators boxing team, however, was discontinued in 1943 during World War II, and was never revived after the war. The Gators men's wrestling team was an SEC-sponsored sport from 1970 to 1979; the team won the 1975 SEC championship tournament and placed second during four other seasons. The wrestling team was eliminated as a result of cost-cutting and Title IX compliance issues in 1979. The University Athletic Association, under athletic director Ray Graves and associate director Ruth Alexander, desired to take a proactive role in Title IX compliance by balancing the number of available men's and women's athletic scholarships, and the resulting tight athletic budgets ultimately resulted in the elimination of men's wrestling program.

== Athletic facilities ==
The University of Florida has invested significant capital and effort in the construction, expansion and betterment of its major sports facilities, including the following outdoor stadiums, indoor arenas, and training and practice facilities:

=== Condron Ballpark at Alfred A. McKethan Field ===
- Completed in 2020, Condron Ballpark plays host to the Gators baseball team's home games. Seating 7,000 spectators (with an expandable capacity of 10,000), Condron Ballpark replaced McKethan Stadium at Perry Field.

=== Steve Spurrier-Florida Field at Ben Hill Griffin Stadium ===
- The Gators football team plays its home games in Steve Spurrier-Florida Field at Ben Hill Griffin Stadium. The stadium was originally constructed in 1930, and was known simply as "Florida Field". In 1989, it was renamed in honor of Ben Hill Griffin, Jr., an alumnus and generous donor to the university and its athletic programs. Since the arrival of coach Steve Spurrier in 1990, the stadium has become nationally known as "The Swamp". The Swamp has been renovated and expanded several times, and has included a natural grass surface since 1990. With the latest expansions, the stadium has an official capacity of 88,548 people, but routinely accommodates more than 90,000 fans for the Gators' home football games. The Swamp is the 12th largest college football stadium in America as measured by official seating capacity.

=== Carse Swimming Complex ===
- Built in 1998 at a cost of $2 million, Carse Swimming Complex is a two-story, 7,000-square-foot (650 m^{2}) facility that includes locker rooms, offices, and direct access to the UAA training pool. The swimming complex is located adjacent to the O'Connell Center.

=== Florida Basketball Practice Complex ===
- Completed in 2001, the Basketball Practice Complex is a two-story, 47,505-square-foot (4,413.4 m^{2}) structure that includes multiple practice gyms, a training room, and a 1,900-square-foot (180 m^{2}) weight room.

=== Donald R. Dizney Stadium ===
- Completed during the summer of 2009, the Florida Lacrosse Facility began hosting the women's lacrosse team with its first season in 2010. The 1,500-seat stadium runs the length of the game field, and the facility includes a second practice field. The facility also includes concessions, ticket offices, locker rooms and a training room.

=== James G. Pressly Stadium and Percy Beard Track ===
- Pressly Stadium is a combined soccer and track and field facility that includes Percy Beard Track. The facility was renovated in 1995, when 2,500 bench seats were added to the existing 2,000-seat concrete grandstand, increasing the total seating capacity to more than 4,500 spectators. The stadium is located on campus, between the Heavener Complex and Linder Stadium, and was renamed in honor of James G. Pressly, Jr., a University of Florida alumnus and benefactor. The women's soccer team plays its home games in Pressly Stadium.
- Percy Beard Track was renovated in 1995 at a cost of $750,000, and the pole vault and long jump pits were moved from the infield to an area outside the track to accommodate the new soccer field. The men's and women's track and field teams host their home meets and the annual Florida Relays on Percy Beard Track during the outdoor track season.

=== Katie Seashole Pressly Softball Stadium ===
- Constructed in 1996 at a cost of $2.6 million, Pressly Softball Stadium is the home field of the Gators women's softball team. The facility is located on campus, seats approximately 1,200 fans, includes a clay infield and a grass outfield, and complies with NCAA and Olympic specifications. The stadium is named for benefactor Katie Pressly. The Gators played their first game in the stadium against Stetson University on February 8, 1997.

=== Lemerand Center ===
- Built in 1995 and named in honor of donor Gale Lemerand, the Lemerand Center is a 43,000-square-foot (4,000 m^{2}) all-sports facility that includes locker rooms, storage, and training equipment, and is used by all varsity athletes at the University of Florida.

=== Mark Bostick Golf Course and Guy Bostick Clubhouse ===
- Designed by golf course architect Donald Ross and originally developed in 1963, the eighteen-hole Mark Bostick Golf Course is the official golf course of the University of Florida. The men's and women's golf teams play their home matches on the course, and the course also hosts the Gator and Lady Gator Golf Day Pro-Am. The course is 6,701 yards (6,127 m) in length, and is rated as a par 70. In 2001, Bobby Weed renovated the course with a $4 million donation from benefactor Mark Bostick.
- The Guy Bostick Clubhouse is equipped with numerous amenities and includes over 8,000 square feet (740 m^{2}) of interior space.

=== Steinbrenner Band Hall ===
- Finished in 2008, Steinbrenner Band Hall is The Pride of the Sunshine's rehearsal hall, and also houses offices, instrument storage, the band library and an instrument issue room. Construction of the band hall was made possible by a generous gift from George Steinbrenner and his wife Joan in 2002.

=== Scott Linder Stadium at Ring Tennis Complex ===
- Originally constructed in 1987, Linder Stadium serves as the home court of the men's and women's tennis teams. The facility was renovated at a cost of $1.7 million in 1999, when the building interior space was expanded to 7,163 square feet (665.5 m^{2}), and includes coaches' offices, a training room, locker rooms, and a 3,000-square-foot (280 m^{2}) exterior courtyard. The stadium includes a 1,000-seat grandstand overlooking the six lighted main courts, and also includes a second row of nine practice courts. The complex is located on campus, adjacent to the College of Law and James G. Pressly Stadium.

=== Stephen C. O'Connell Center ===
- Constructed from 1977 to 1980, the O'Connell Center is a multi-purpose arena that is home to the men's and women's basketball, women's gymnastics, men's and women's indoor track and field, and women's volleyball teams. It is commonly known as the "O'Dome". In its major interior space, the O'Connell Center can accommodate over 12,000 sports fans, and the university also uses the facility for graduation ceremonies and a variety of concerts, lectures and shows. The O'Dome also includes the Natatorium, where the Gators swimming and diving teams compete. The O'Dome underwent a major renovation 2016 with upgraded luxury suites, concession stands, locker rooms, and a new main entrance facing Ben Hill Griffin Stadium, but the seating capacity was reduced to over 10,000 fans.
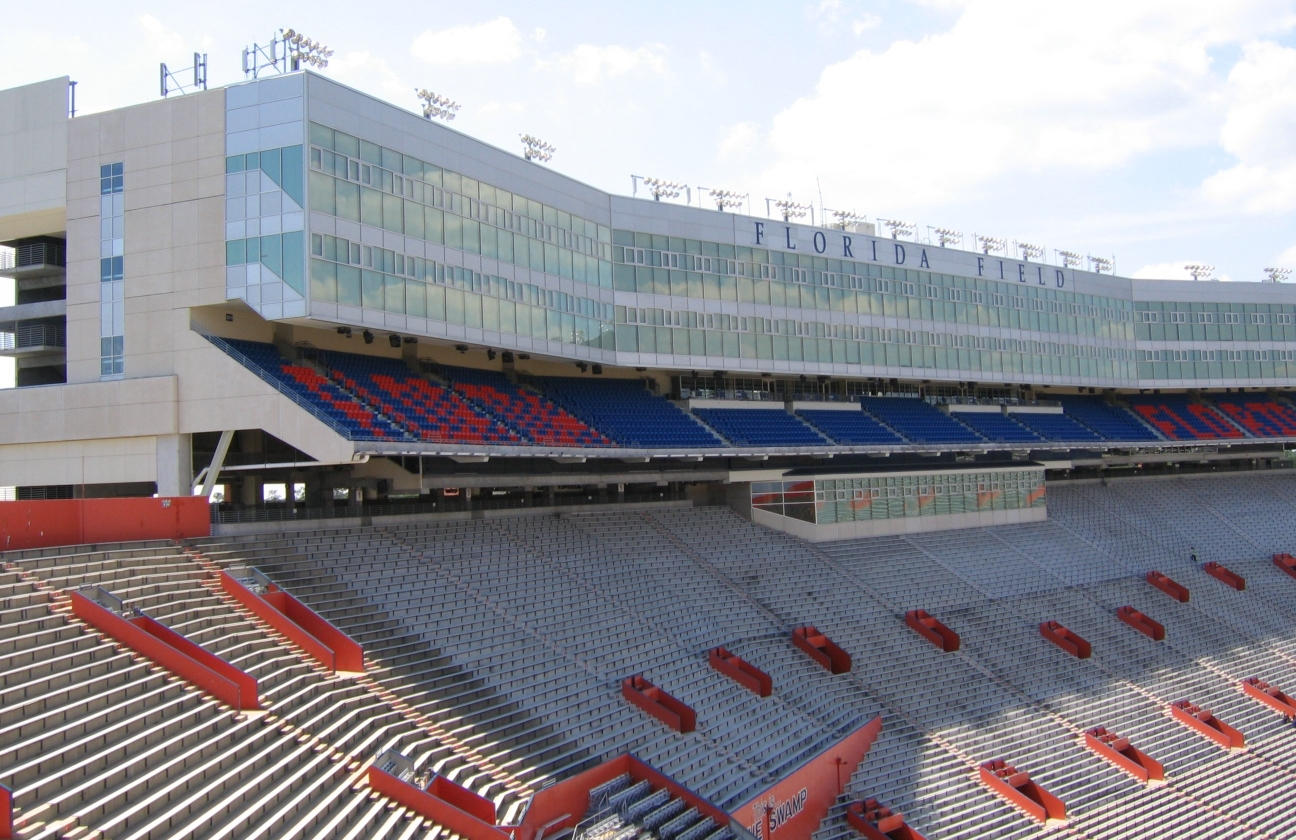
Steve Spurrier-Florida Field at Ben Hill Griffin Stadium

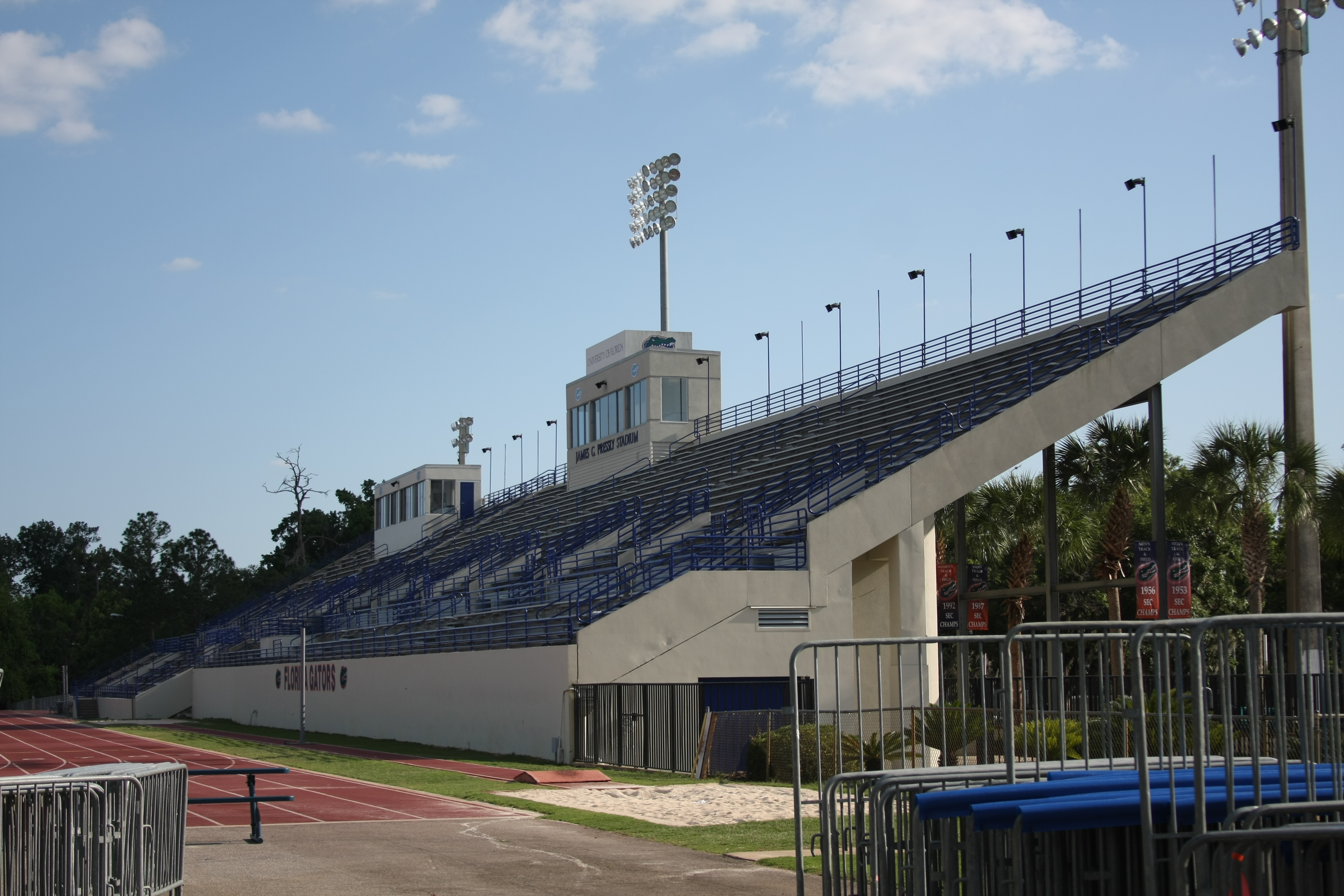
James G. Pressly Stadium

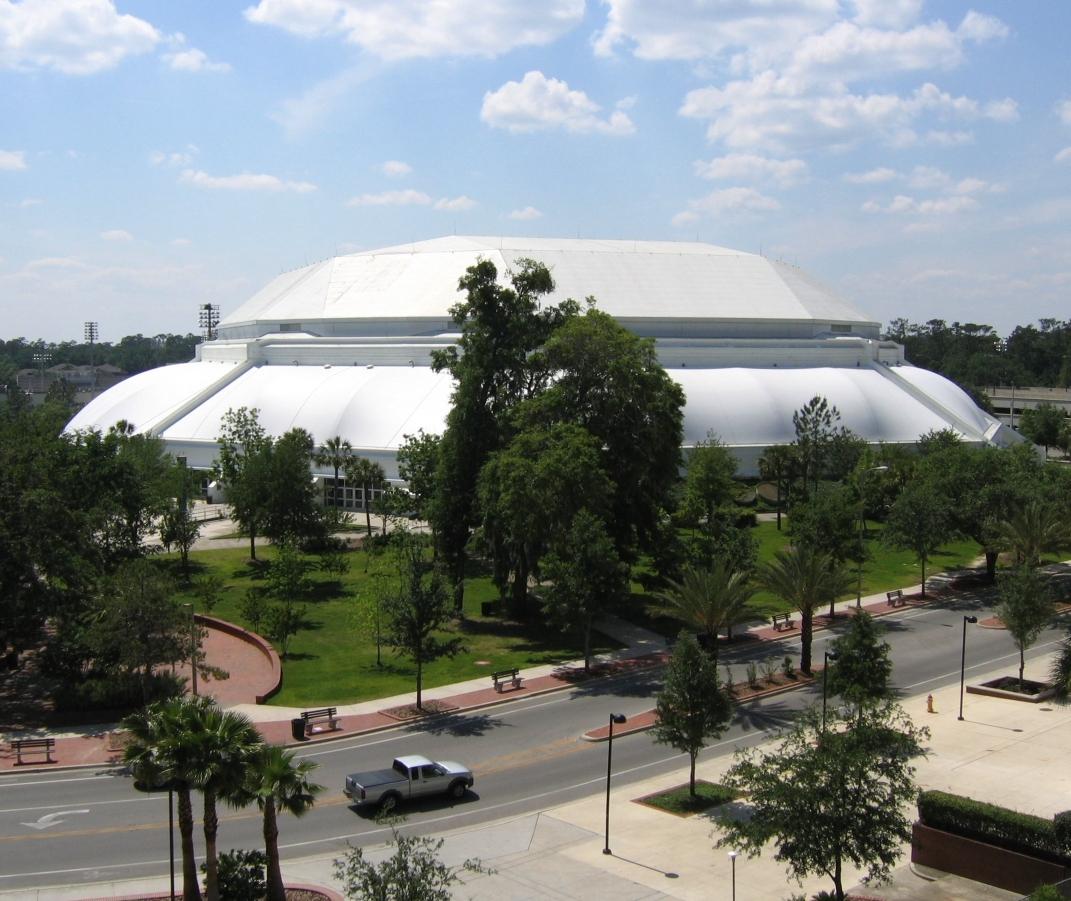
O'Connell Center

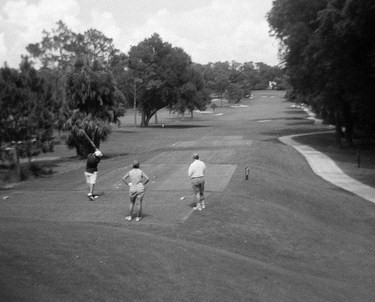
Mark Bostick Golf Course
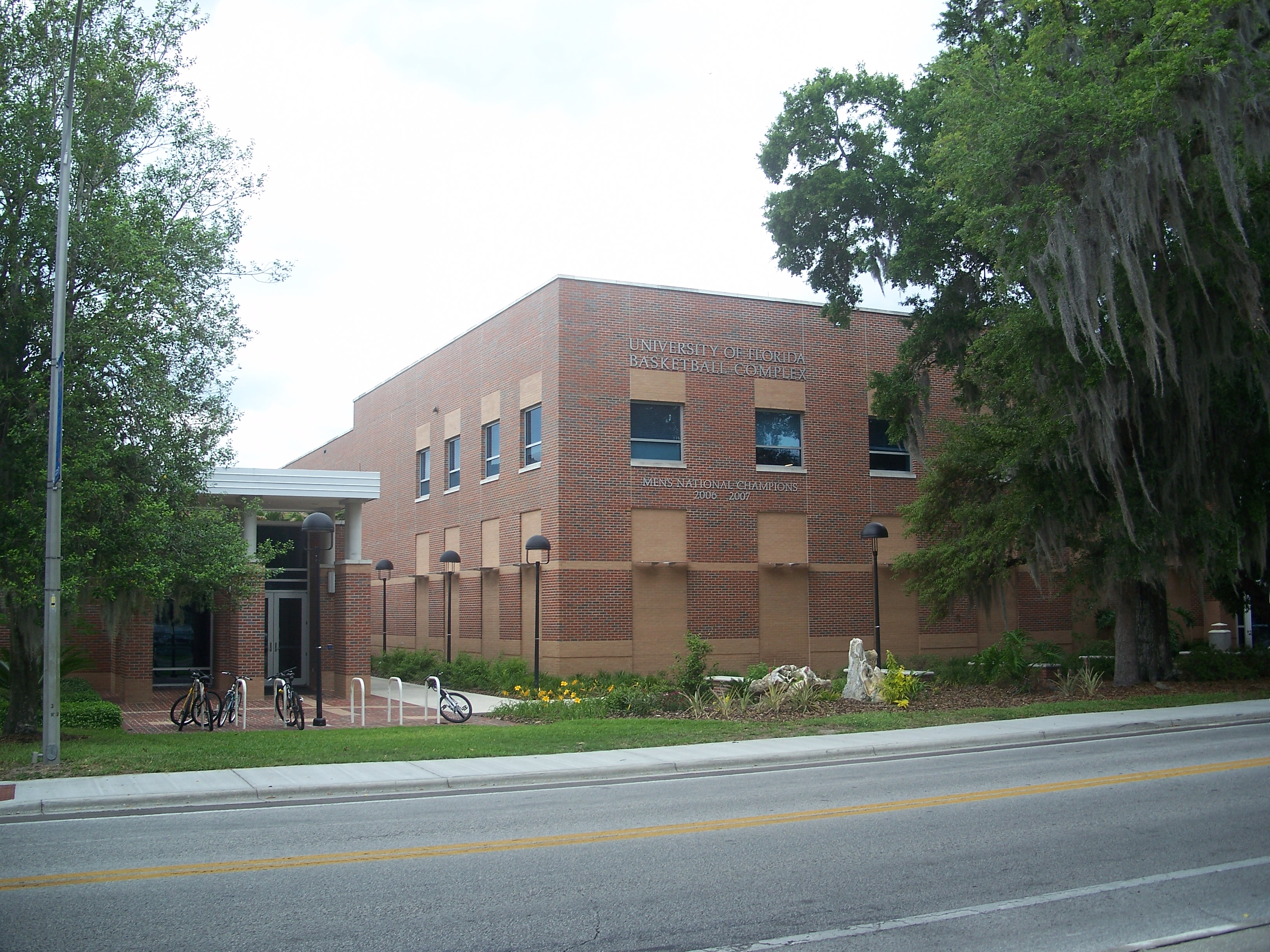
Basketball Complex

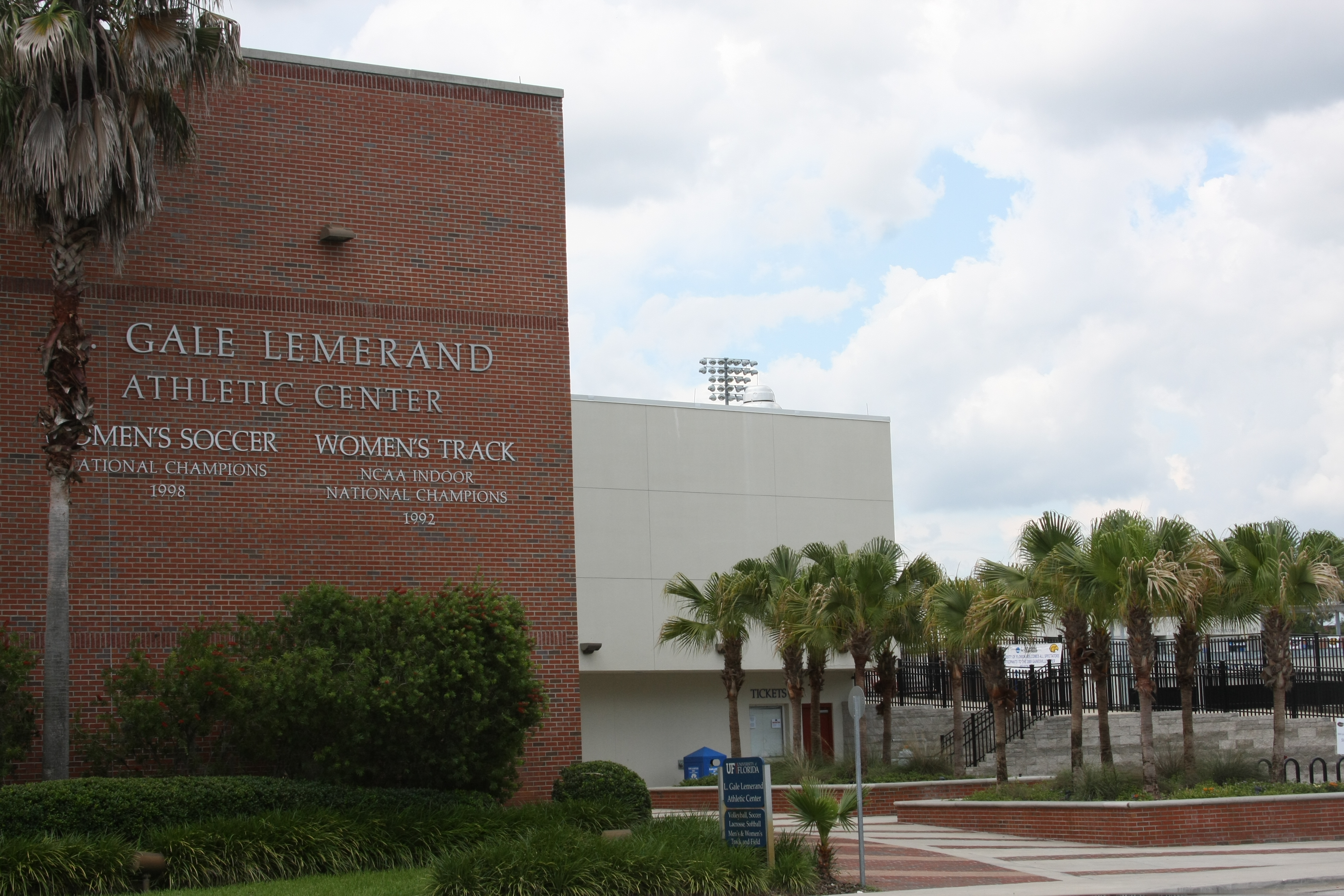
Lemerand Center

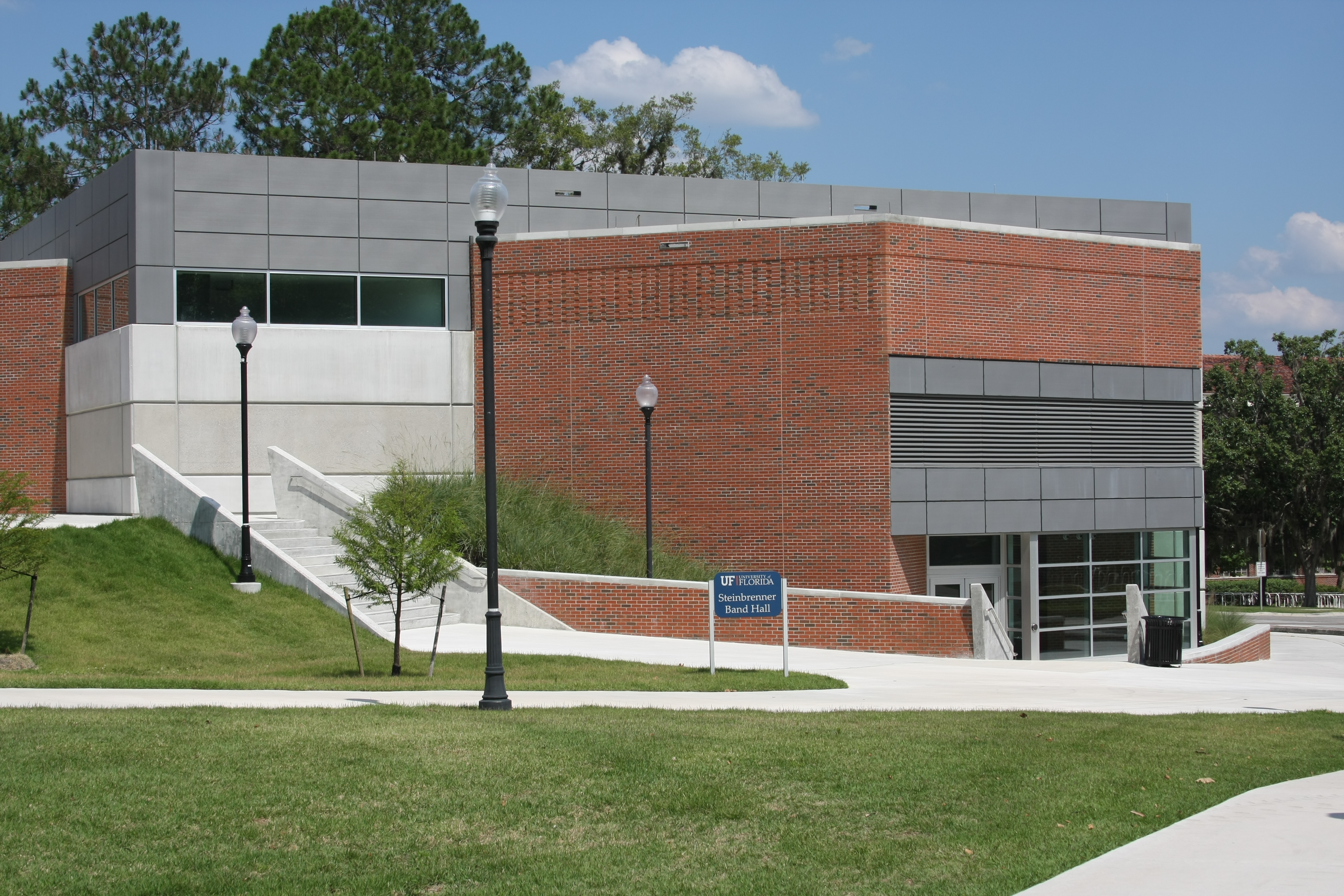
Steinbrenner Band Hall

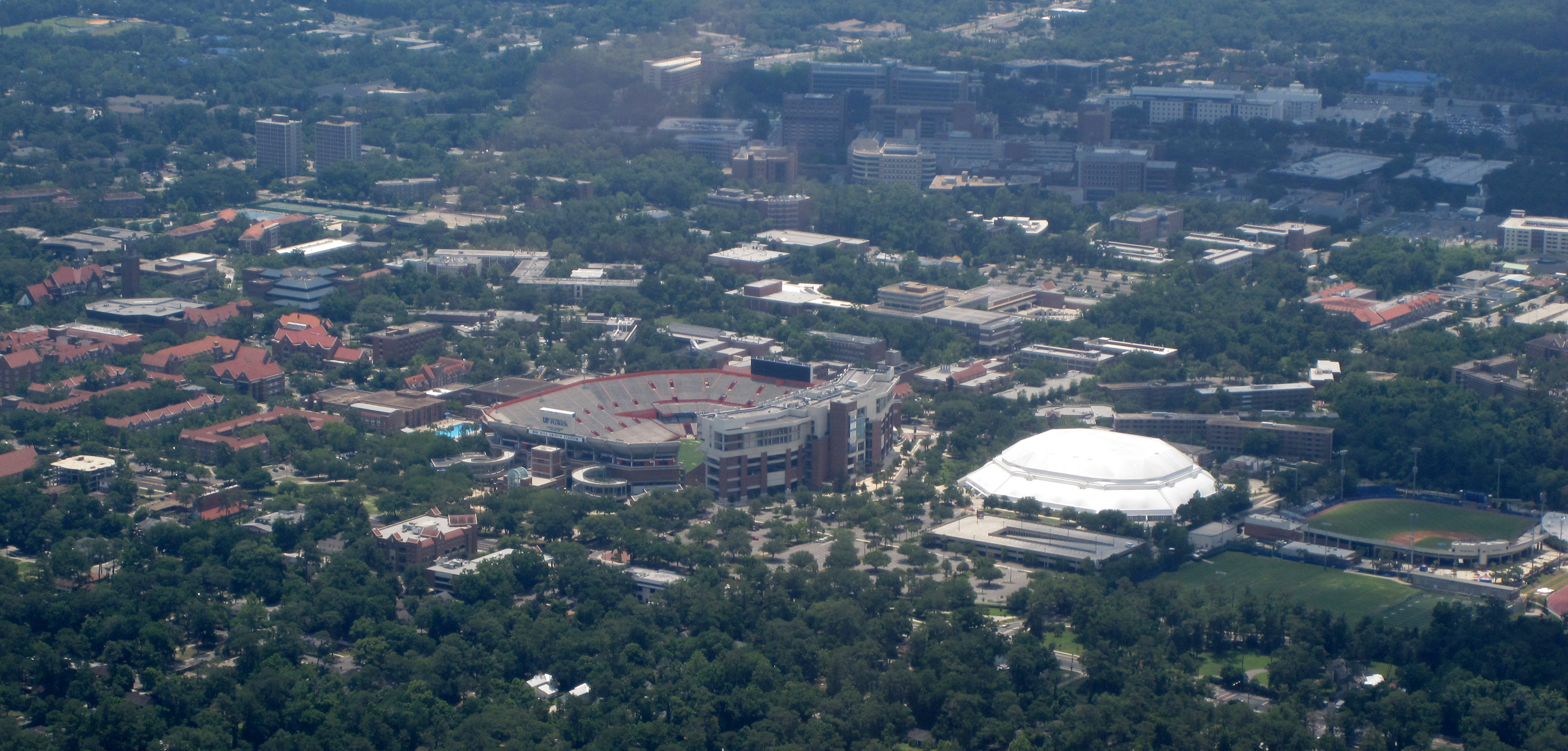
Aerial shot of The Swamp, O'Dome, and Perry Field

== Athletic program culture and traditions ==
=== Colors and mascot ===
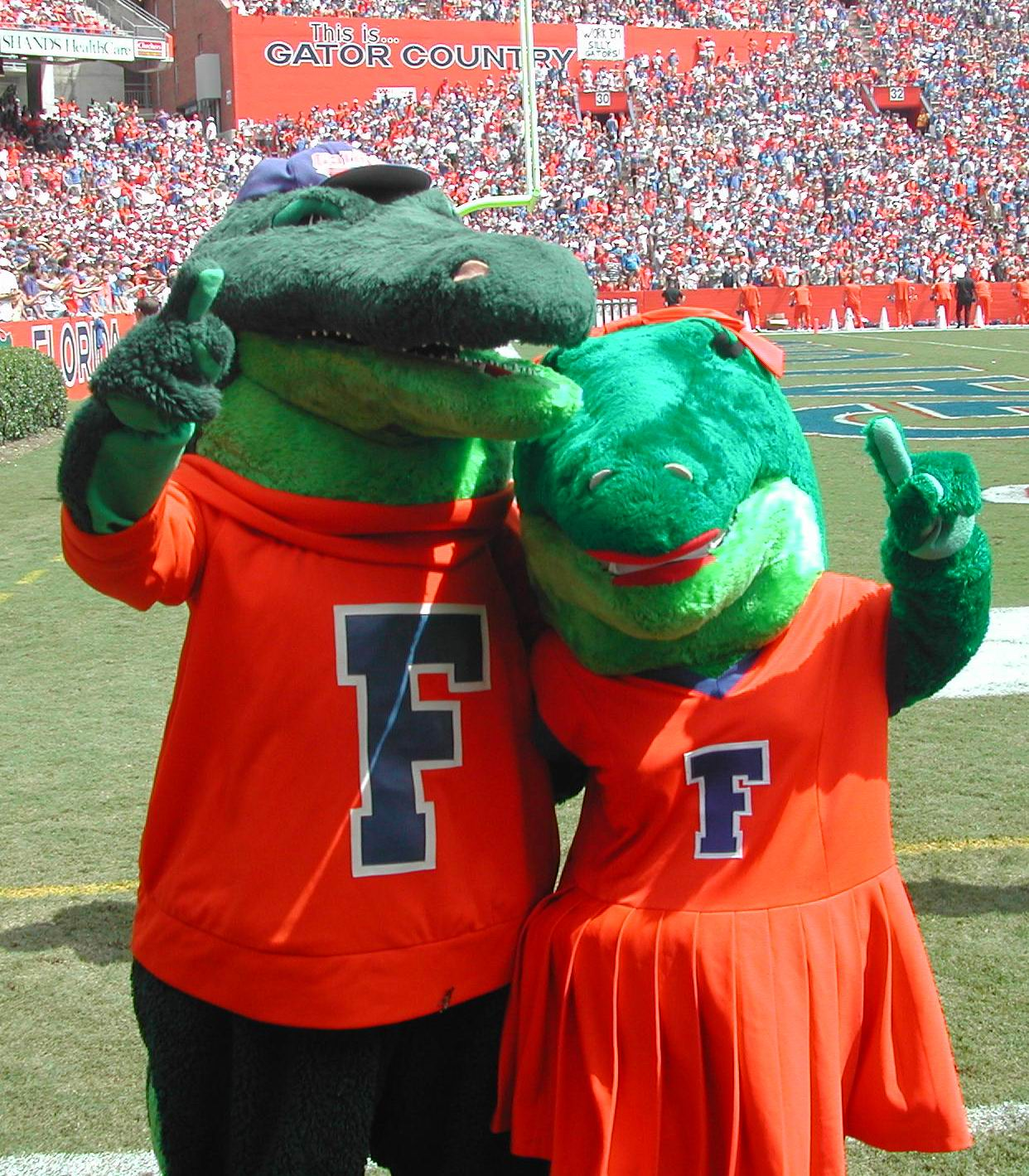
The University of Florida's costumed mascots, Albert and Alberta Gator

The University of Florida began its sports program soon after it was established in Gainesville in 1906, and its teams adopted orange and blue as their official colors soon thereafter. These colors are probably a combination of the colors of the two primary institutions that merged to form the university, as the East Florida Seminary used orange and black and the Florida Agricultural College used blue and white.

As with the school colors, the exact origin of the alligator (almost always shortened to "gator") as the school mascot is not well documented. It likely originated in 1908, when Gainesville merchant Phillip Miller chose the animal to adorn pennants he designed for sale to students. The school did not yet have a mascot, and Miller chose the alligator because it is native to Florida and was not claimed by any other school. The football team subsequently adopted the "Gators" nickname in 1911. There are two theories as how the name become synonymous with the university's athletic programs. One theory is that the 1911 football squad began calling themselves the Gators in honor of team captain Neal "Bo Gator" Storter. Storter himself refuted this explanation, saying that it originated when a sportswriter in South Carolina described Florida's 1911 road upset of Clemson as an "invasion of alligators from Florida" and the players adopted the name. Whatever its origins, the nickname "Gators" (and for a time, "Lady Gators" for women's sports) has been used by the University of Florida's athletic program for over a century.

==== Albert and Alberta ====
Albert and Alberta are the official costumed mascots of the Florida Gators. Many variations of Albert have been present at sporting events over the decades, and a live alligator was used for many years. The current version of Albert was introduced in the early 1980s, and Alberta joined him in 1984. They are unique among the SEC's mascots as the only male-and-female pair, and are featured together in a life-sized statue outside of UF's Alumni Affairs Building.

=== Other traditions ===
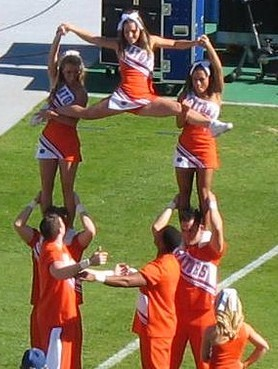
Cheerleaders performing at a home football game

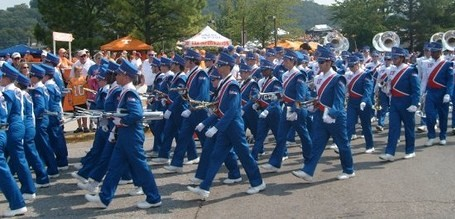
The Pride of the Sunshine

The University of Florida's marching band is known as "The Pride of the Sunshine", and plays at every home football game, and also performs at various events such as Gator Growl and parades. Florida's fight song is The Orange and Blue. The Gatorettes are the baton-twirlers, or majorettes, for the marching band. The University of Florida dance team that performs at home basketball games and other sports events is known as the Dazzlers.

The "Gator Chomp" is a gesture made by Florida Gators fans and players to show their support of the Florida Gators sports teams. The UF band originated the gesture in 1981 and it is performed by fully extending one's arms, right over left, in front of the body with the palms facing each other, and then moved apart and together to symbolize an alligator's mouth. When performed by fans at home football or basketball games, the chomp is often accompanied by Florida's marching band or pep band playing the two-note shark motif from the film Jaws. Another football fan tradition, both for home and road games, is playing and singing of "We Are the Boys from Old Florida" at the end of every third quarter. Following the death of Gainesville native Tom Petty in October 2017, his song "I Won't Back Down" is also played right after "We Are the Boys" while the entire stadium sings along.

"Orange and blue" is a fan cheer that is popular at home sports events, with alternate stadium sections yelling "Orange!", and answering back with their loudest "Blue!" This can go back and forth for several minutes, with both sections competing to be the louder.

The football team had a long-time tradition of having George Edmondson Jr., better known as "Mr. Two Bits", wandering through the stands with a sign and a whistle to pump up the crowd to the "Two Bits" cheer. Edmondson officially retired in 2008 and was made an honorary alumnus in 2005. His final appearance as Mr. Two Bits was at the last home game of the 2008 season against The Citadel.

In June 2020, then university president Kent Fuchs announced that the University Athletic Association and the Gator Band would cease the use of the "Gator Bait" cheer at UF sporting events. While the university found no direct link between its usage of the phrase at sporting events and historical depictions of black children being used as alligator bait, it decided to end the chant due to "horrific racist imagery" associated with the phrase. The decision was reached amid a growing demand for social justice in the United States following the murder of George Floyd by Minneapolis police and the ensuing protests.

== Notable Gator athletes and benefactors ==
=== University of Florida Athletic Hall of Fame ===
Over 250 notable former Gators athletes and coaches have been inducted into the University of Florida Athletic Hall of Fame. Hall of Fame inductees fall into three categories: "Gator Greats"; "Distinguished Letterwinners"; and "Honorary Letterwinners". Gator Greats are those former athletes who distinguished themselves during their undergraduate sports careers, and include former All-Americans, all-conference selections, winners of major national awards, individual national champions, and those who significantly contributed to national team championships. Distinguished Letterwinners are those former Gators athletes who achieved distinction after graduation, as athletic coaches or administrators, professional athletes, or in public service or other career activities. Honorary Letterwinners are those persons who are not University of Florida alumni and former undergraduate athletes but have distinguished themselves by their significant contributions to the success of Florida Gators sports teams, including former championship Gators coaches.

Gator Greats include Heisman Trophy winners Steve Spurrier, Danny Wuerffel, and Tim Tebow; Pro Football Hall of Fame members Jack Youngblood and Emmitt Smith; Olympic gold medal swimmers Tracy Caulkins, Nicole Haislett and Dara Torres; individual NCAA golf champions Page Dunlap, Nick Gilliam and Bob Murphy; Olympic gold medal soccer players Heather Mitts and Abby Wambach; and individual NCAA tennis champions Jill Craybas, Jeff Morrison and Lisa Raymond.

Distinguished Letterwinners include head coaches Doug Dickey, Lindy Infante and Dutch Stanley, as well as U.S. Senator George Smathers.

Honorary Letterwinners include former Gators national championship coaches Buster Bishop, Andy Brandi, Randy Reese and Mimi Ryan, former football coach and four-star general James Van Fleet, as well as medical professor Robert Cade, who invented the sports drink Gatorade at UF in the mid-1960s as a rehydration aid to assist Gators athletes.

=== Gators in the Olympic Games ===
The University of Florida has a reputation and long history of producing athletes who compete in the Olympic Games. Over 160 university alumni, including Florida Gators athletes from over 35 countries, have competed in the Games, winning fifty Olympic gold medals, twenty-nine silver medals and thirty bronze medals (through the end of the 2012 Summer Olympics).

The list of notable Gator Olympians and gold medalists includes sprinters Kerron Clement, Dennis Mitchell, and Bernard Williams; marathon runner Frank Shorter; baseball outfielder Brad Wilkerson; basketball forward DeLisha Milton-Jones; soccer forward Abby Wambach; and swimmers Tracy Caulkins, Nicole Haislett and Ryan Lochte.

Former Gator Dara Torres is the only American swimmer to compete in five Olympic Games (1984, 1988, 1992, 2000, 2008). At the age of 41, Torres became the oldest swimmer to win an Olympic medal when she won a silver medal in her inclusion in three events in 2008, finishing her career with a total of twelve Olympic medals (including four gold).
