= Ron Jourdan =

American college and Olympic athlete

Personal information
- Full name: Ronald Lee Jordan
- National team: United States
- Born: February 28, 1947 Pensacola, Florida
- Died: January 1, 2014 (aged 66) Baldwyn, Mississippi
- Height: 6 ft 1 in (1.85 m)
- Weight: 150 lb (68 kg)

Sport
- Sport: Track and field
- Event: High jump
- College team: University of Florida
- Club: Florida Track Club

Ronald Lee Jourdan (February 28, 1947 – January 1, 2014) was an American college and Olympic track and field athlete. Jourdan was a National Collegiate Athletic Association (NCAA) champion in the high jump from Florida and member of the 1972 U.S. Olympic team. Jourdan, along with Reynaldo Brown of California, were the last great American high jumpers to use the straight-leg straddle, the style which dominated the sport in the 1950s and 1960s. Jourdan's personal best was 7 feet 3 inches (2.21 meters).

== Early years ==
Jourdan was born and raised in Pensacola, Florida. He attended the University of Florida in Gainesville, Florida, where he was a member of coach Jimmy Carnes' Florida Gators track and field team from 1966 to 1970. In his junior year, Jourdan won the 1969 NCAA Division 1 Indoor championship at Detroit's Cobo Hall, establishing a new meet record of 7 ft 0 3/4 in (2.153 m), breaking the record of 7'0" set in 1966 by Otis Burrell of Nevada: it was the only record broken at those championships. That same year he also won both the indoor and outdoor Southeastern Conference (SEC) championships, setting new meet records of 7'0" both times. Jourdan finished fourth at the Amateur Athletic Union (AAU) outdoor championships in 1969 and finished the season with the fourth-best jump in the world for that year (2.185). He was on the cover of the April 1969 issue of Track and Field News. He repeated as SEC champion in the high jump in 1970, both indoors and outdoors, jumping 6-10 both times. He later equaled his personal best (2.185), the tenth best jump in the world in 1970. Jourdan was later inducted into the University of Florida Athletic Hall of Fame as a "Gator Great."

== 1972 Olympics ==
After graduating from the University of Florida with a bachelor's degree in 1973, Jourdan remained at Gainesville and competed for the Florida Track Club (FTC). Jourdan stood six-feet, one-inch (1.86 meters) tall, and was rail-thin at 150 pounds (68 kilograms). At the 1972 Olympic Trials, held in Eugene, Oregon, between June 29 and July 9, Jourdan was one of four members of the FTC to qualify for the Munich Olympics, along with distance runners Frank Shorter, Jack Bacheler and Jeff Galloway. The men's high jump final was held on the last day, and Jourdan began competition at 2.10 (6'-9") and set a personal best of 2.21 (7'-3"), finishing second to Dwight Stones. The top three all jumped 7'-3" on their second attempts, securing their berths to Munich, then failed at 7'-4 1/2" (2.25), with Stones winning by virtue of fewer misses at lower heights. Both Stones (UCLA) and Chris Dunn (Colgate) were younger and taller collegiate jumpers (6'-6" and 6'-5", respectively) and utilized the - then relatively new - Fosbury Flop style, while Jourdan and Reynaldo Brown (who finished fourth) used the classic straight-leg straddle.

While training in Italy immediately prior to the Olympics, Jourdan sustained a leg injury. At the Olympics in September, he did not advance out of the Qualifying Round. He began competition at the low height of 1.90 (6'-3") because of his injury and progressed through 2.00, 2.06, 2.09 and 2.12 all on his first attempts, before missing all three tries at 2.15 (7'-0 3/4"). Jourdan holds the distinction of being the first athlete from the University of Florida to qualify for the Olympics in the sport of track and field (athletics). Track & Field News magazine ("The Bible of the Sport") ranked Jourdan the #2 U.S. high jumper in 1972 (behind Dwight Stones, who won the Bronze medal at Munich with a leap of 7'-3" in the finals).

In 1973, Jourdan gave up his amateur status and continued to compete in the high jump as a professional on tour with the newly created International Track Association (ITA). Despite initial success, the ITA folded within a few years.

He died January 1, 2014, in Baldwyn, Mississippi, shortly after retiring from a 30-year career with Warrior & Gulf Navigation Company, a barge company in Mobile, Alabama.

=== Photographs ===
- Jourdan was featured on the cover of the April (II) 1969 edition of Track & Field News, Past Covers 1969; in a unique photograph taken from underneath the high jump bar as Jourdan, with his right leg still straight, rotates over the bar.

== See also ==
- Florida Gators
- List of University of Florida alumni
- List of University of Florida Athletic Hall of Fame members
- List of University of Florida Olympians
