= General Griffin =

General Griffin may refer to:

- Benjamin S. Griffin (born 1946), U.S. Army four-star general
- Charles Griffin (1825–1867), Union Army major general
- John Griffin, 4th Baron Howard de Walden (1719–1797), British Army general
- Simon Goodell Griffin (1824–1902), Union Army brigadier general

== See also ==
- Attorney General Griffin (disambiguation)
