= List of Mercer University people =

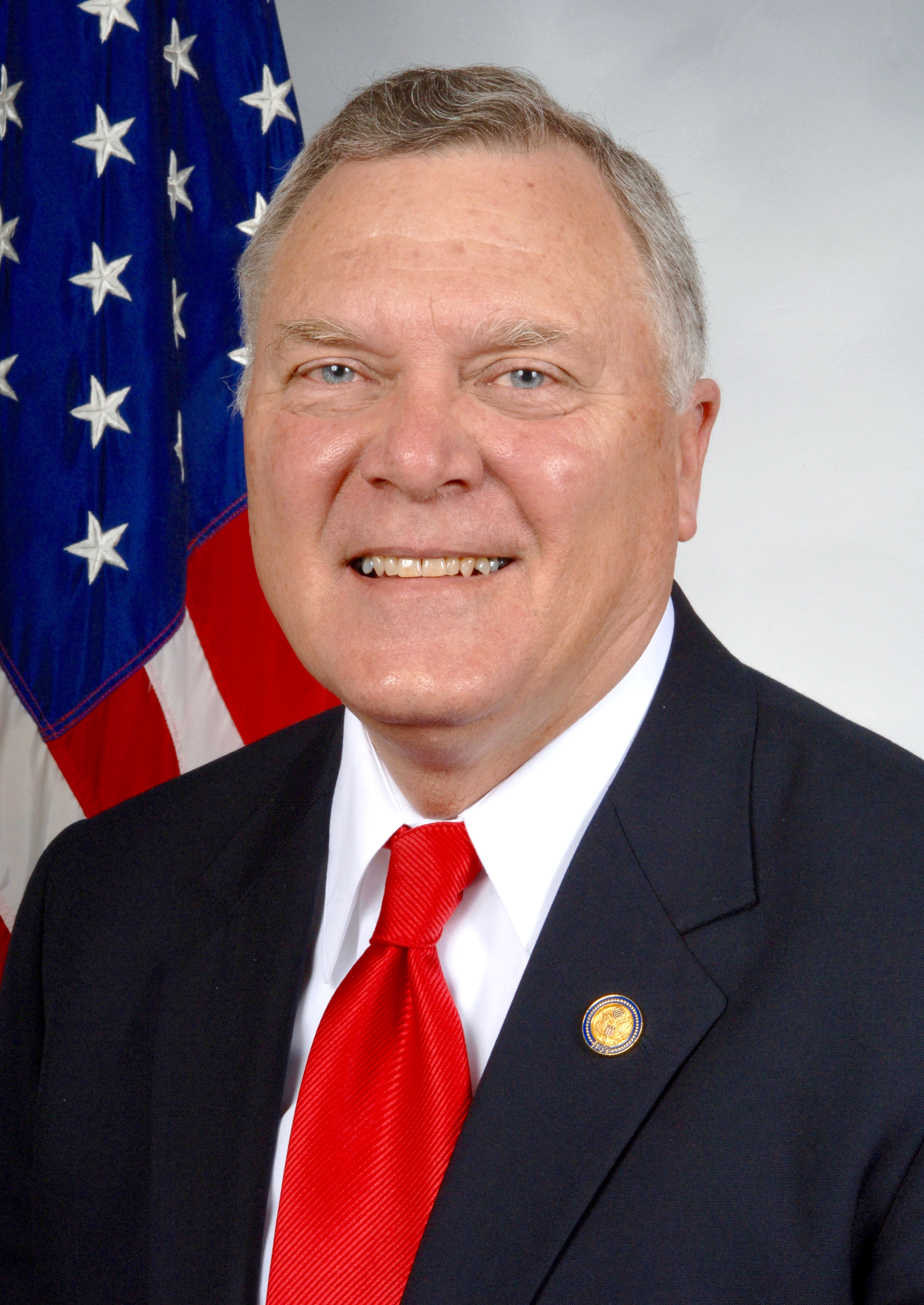
Nathan Deal served as governor of Georgia from 2011 to 2019. He earned his undergraduate degree from Mercer in 1964 and graduated from Mercer's Walter F. George School of Law in 1966.

Mercer University is a private, coeducational university in Macon, Georgia, founded in 1833.

Mercer is the only university of its size in the United States that offers programs in eleven diverse fields of study: liberal arts, business, education, music, engineering, medicine, nursing, pharmacy, law, theology, and continuing and professional studies. Mercer enrolls approximately 8,300 students in its eleven colleges and schools.

== Alumni ==
This is a list of notable Mercer alumni and employees.

=== Arts, education, media, and industry ===
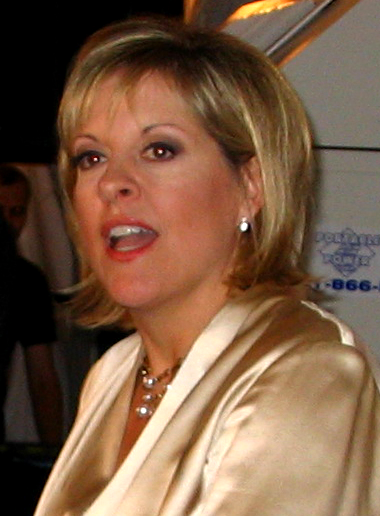
Nancy Grace was the host of Nancy Grace on HLN. She earned her undergraduate degree from Mercer in 1981, and graduated from Mercer's Walter F. George School of Law in 1984.

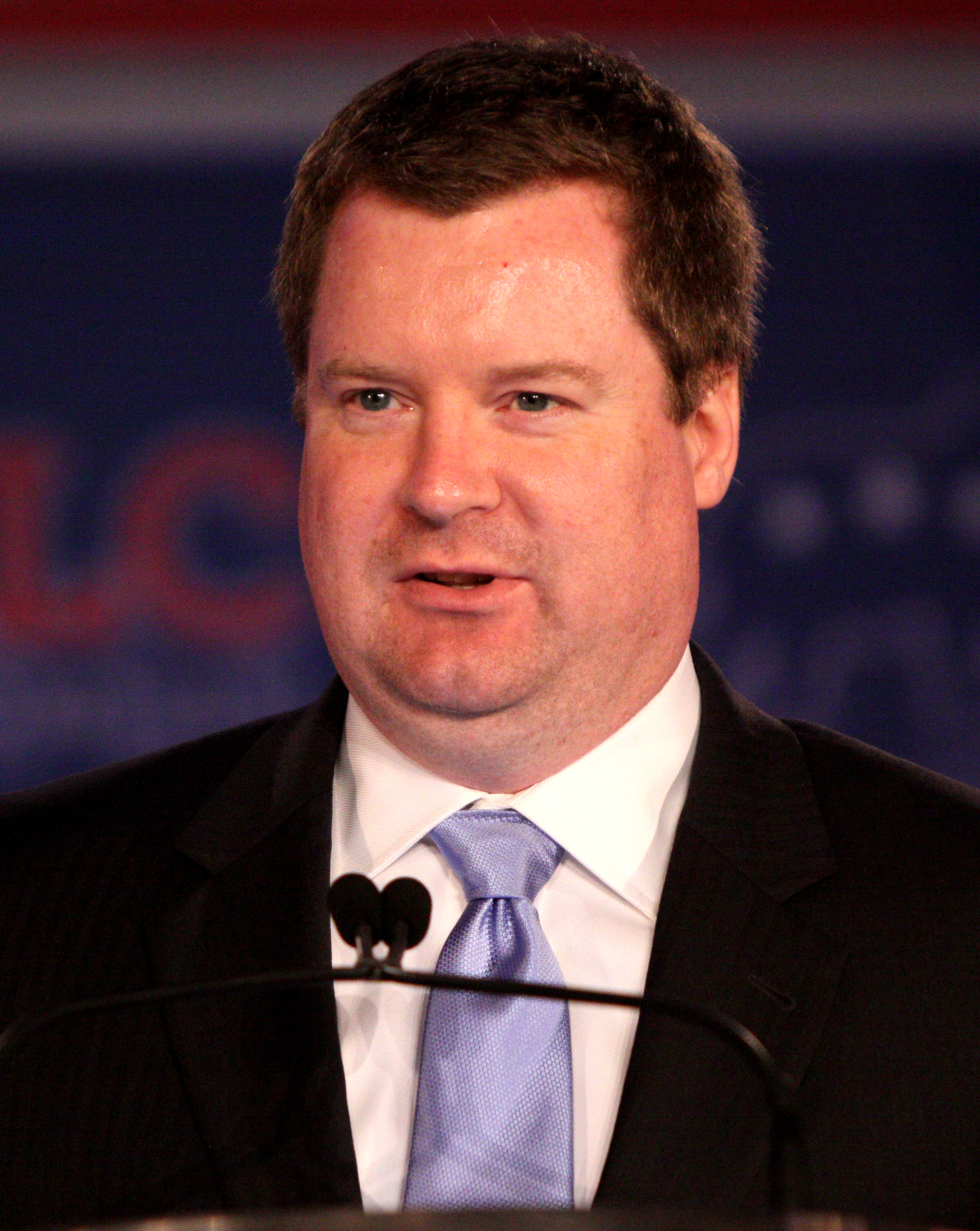
Erick Erickson is a political contributor for John King, USA on CNN. He earned his undergraduate degree from Mercer in 1997, and graduated from Mercer's Walter F. George School of Law in 2000.

- Tom Abbott – broadcaster with Golf Channel and NBC Sports
- Gregg Allman – musician, received an honorary degree in 2016
- Steve Berry – author of six novels, including several New York Times bestsellers
- David Bottoms – Georgia Poet Laureate, 2000–2012
- James C. Coomer – political scientist and author
- Luis Eduardo Díaz Granados – businessman
- Harry Stillwell Edwards – former editor, Macon Telegraph; author of 19 books, including the Southern classic Eneas Africanus
- Erick Erickson – political contributor for John King, USA on CNN
- Nancy Grace – legal commentator and guest host for Larry King Live; hosted her own show, Nancy Grace on CNN
- Keitaro Harada – opera and orchestra conductor
- Rufus Carrollton Harris – president, Tulane University, 1939–1960; president, Mercer University, 1960–1979, co-author of the GI Bill
- Malcolm Johnson – Pulitzer Prize-winning author (1949); his reports were the basis for On the Waterfront
- Anne B. Kerr – president, Florida Southern College
- William Heard Kilpatrick – career educator; first president of the Bennington College board of trustees, 1931–1938
- Bernice Brown McCullar – university professor and columnist
- Bruce D. McDonald III – university professor and editor, Old Dominion University
- Reg Murphy – former president and vice chairman, National Geographic Society; publisher, Baltimore Sun; editor and publisher, San Francisco Examiner; editor, Atlanta Journal-Constitution; author of Uncommon Sense: The Achievement of Griffin Bell
- William F. Ogburn – sociologist; former president of the American Sociological Society
- George P. Oslin – former Western Union executive; invented the singing telegram in 1933
- Lyman Ray Patterson – law professor and copyright scholar; former dean, Emory University School of Law
- James Rachels – moral philosopher, university professor, and author; best known for his writing on euthanasia
- Adam Ragusea – popular food YouTuber and former journalism professor at Mercer University
- Ed Roberts – designed the first commercially successful personal computer in 1975; known as "the father of the personal computer"
- Ferrol Sams – widely read Southern author, known for Run with the Horsemen and Whisper of the River
- Corbett H. Thigpen – psychiatrist; co-author of The Three Faces of Eve
- Ellis Paul Torrance – educator known for pioneering research in creativity; namesake of the Torrance Center for Creativity and Talent Development
- Phil Walden – music pioneer and founder of Capricorn Records; represented Otis Redding and The Allman Brothers

=== Law ===
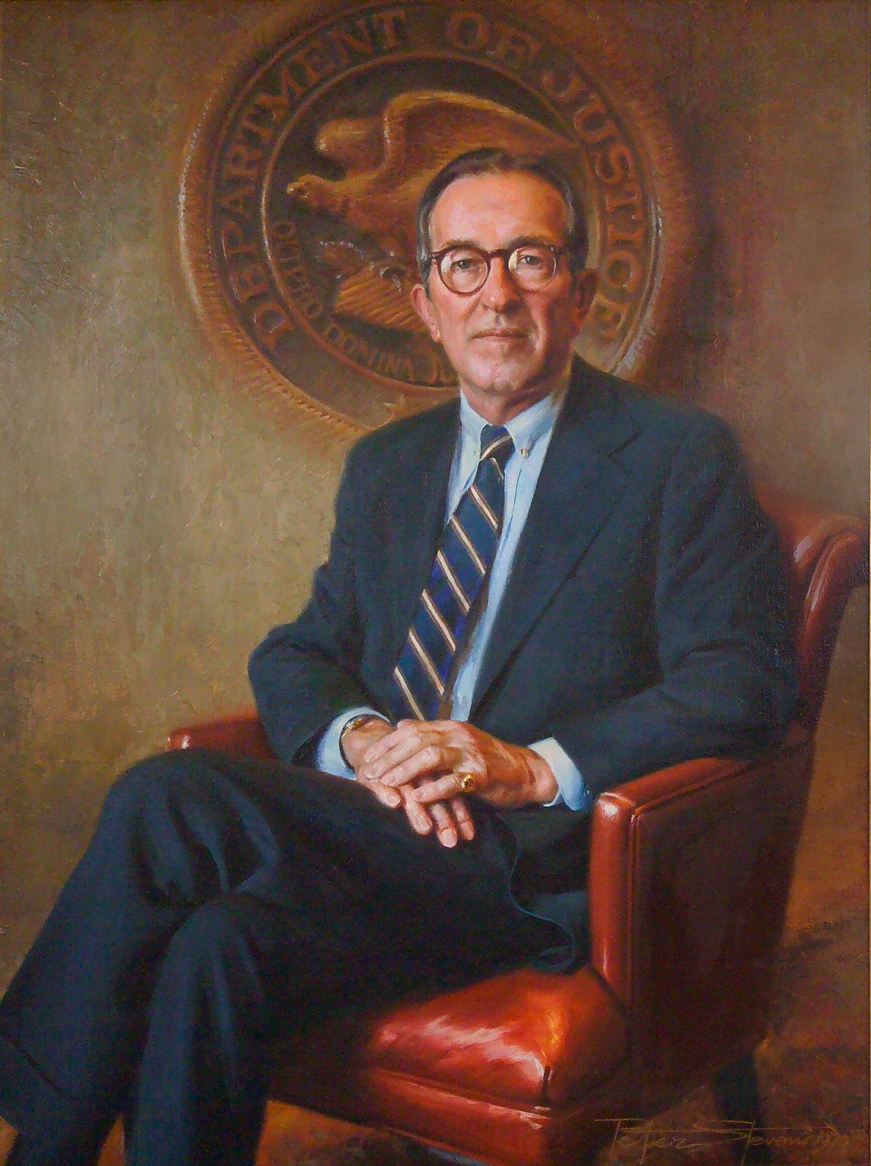
Griffin Bell served as the attorney general of the United States from 1977 to 1979. He graduated from Mercer's Walter F. George School of Law in 1948.

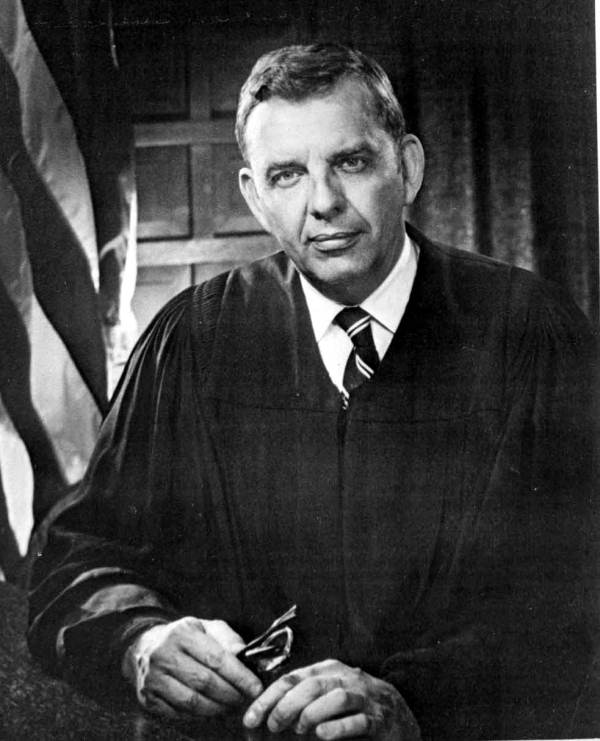
G. Harrold Carswell served as a judge of the United States Court of Appeals for the Fifth Circuit from 1969 to 1970. He was an unsuccessful nominee to the United States Supreme Court in 1970. He graduated from Mercer's Walter F. George School of Law in 1948.

For further alumni, see also: Walter F. George School of Law.

- Griffin Bell – judge, United States Court of Appeals, 1962–1976; 72nd Attorney General of the United States, 1977–1979
- William Augustus Bootle – judge, Federal District Court for the Middle District of Georgia, 1954–2005; ordered the first admission of an African-American to the University of Georgia in 1961
- G. Harrold Carswell – judge, Federal District Court for the Northern District of Florida, 1958–1969; judge, United States Court of Appeals for the Fifth Circuit, 1969–1970; unsuccessful nominee to the United States Supreme Court, 1970
- Barry Cohen – criminal defense attorney, 1966–2018
- Linton McGee Collins – judge, United States Court of Claims, 1964–1972
- Brainerd Currie – law professor; noted conflict of laws scholar who developed the characterisation concept of governmental interest analysis
- Thomas Hoyt Davis – judge, Federal District Court for the Middle District of Georgia, 1945–1969
- Beverly Daniel Evans, Jr. – Georgia Supreme Court justice, 1904–1917; federal district judge for the Southern District of Georgia, 1917–1922
- Albert John Henderson – judge, United States Court of Appeals, 1979–1999; judge, Federal District Court for the Northern District of Georgia, 1968–1979
- Archibald Battle Lovett – judge, Federal District Court for the Southern District of Georgia, 1941–1945
- Scott D. Makar – Florida Solicitor General
- Carlton Mobley – chief justice, Georgia Supreme Court, 1972–1974; associate justice, 1954–1972; United States representative, Georgia's 6th Congressional district, 1932–1933
- Willie Louis Sands – judge, Federal District Court for the Middle District of Georgia; the first African-American to serve on the court
- Jay Sekulow – chief counsel, American Center for Law and Justice
- Marc T. Treadwell – judge, Federal District Court for the Middle District of Georgia
- L. Lin Wood – attorney and conspiracy theorist on President Donald Trump's legal team tasked with overturning the results of the 2020 U.S. presidential election

=== Politics ===
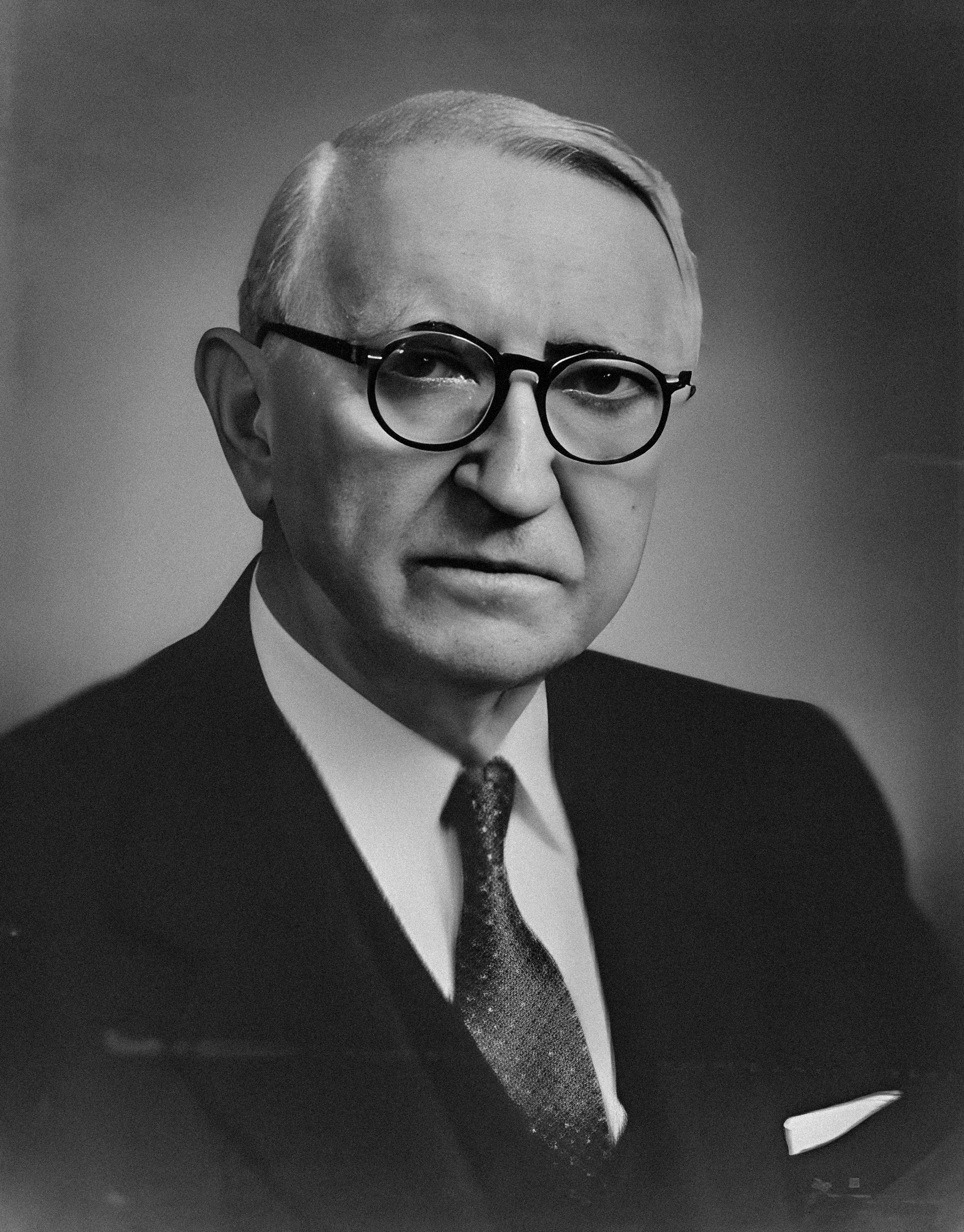
Walter F. George served as a United States senator from Georgia from 1922 to 1957, and as president pro tempore from 1955 to 1957. He earned his law degree from Mercer in 1901, and is the namesake of Mercer's Walter F. George School of Law.

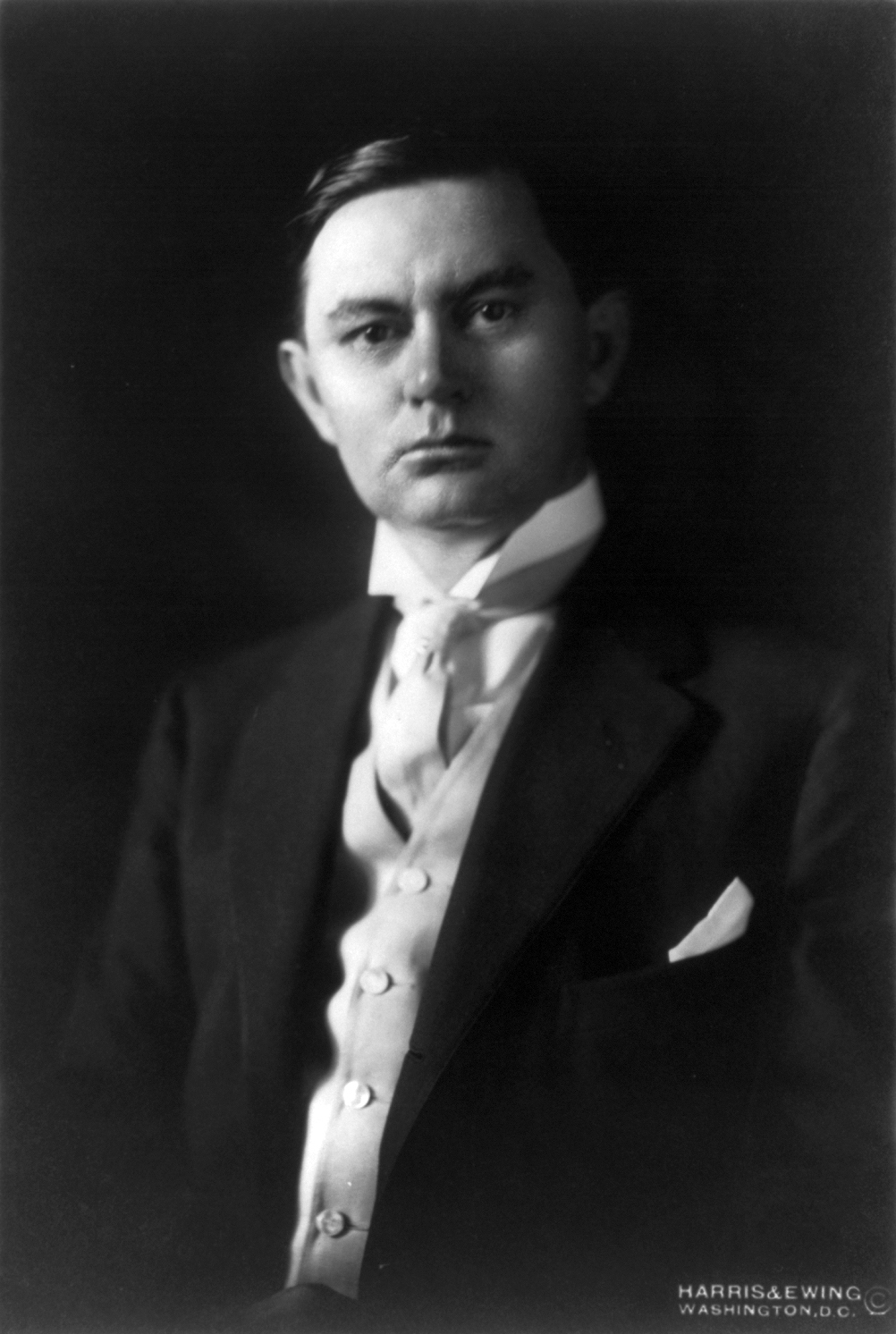
Thomas W. Hardwick served as a United States representative from Georgia from 1903 to 1914, a United States senator from 1914 to 1919, and the governor of Georgia from 1921 to 1923. He earned his undergraduate degree from Mercer in 1892.

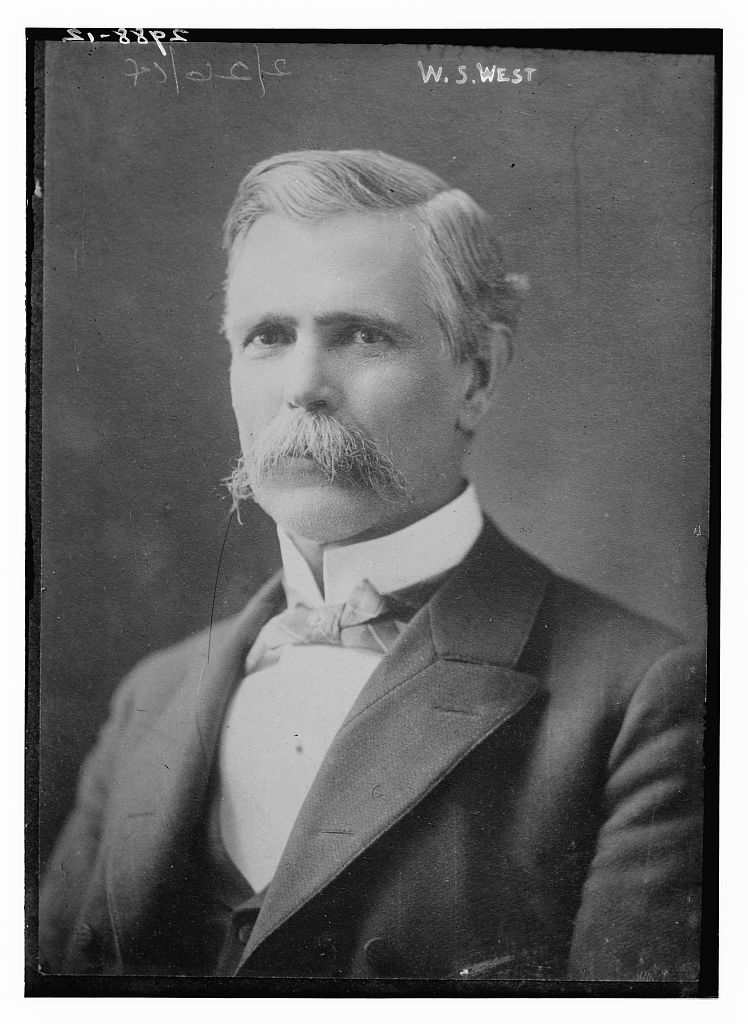
William S. West served as a United States senator from Georgia in 1914. He earned his undergraduate degree from Mercer in 1876.

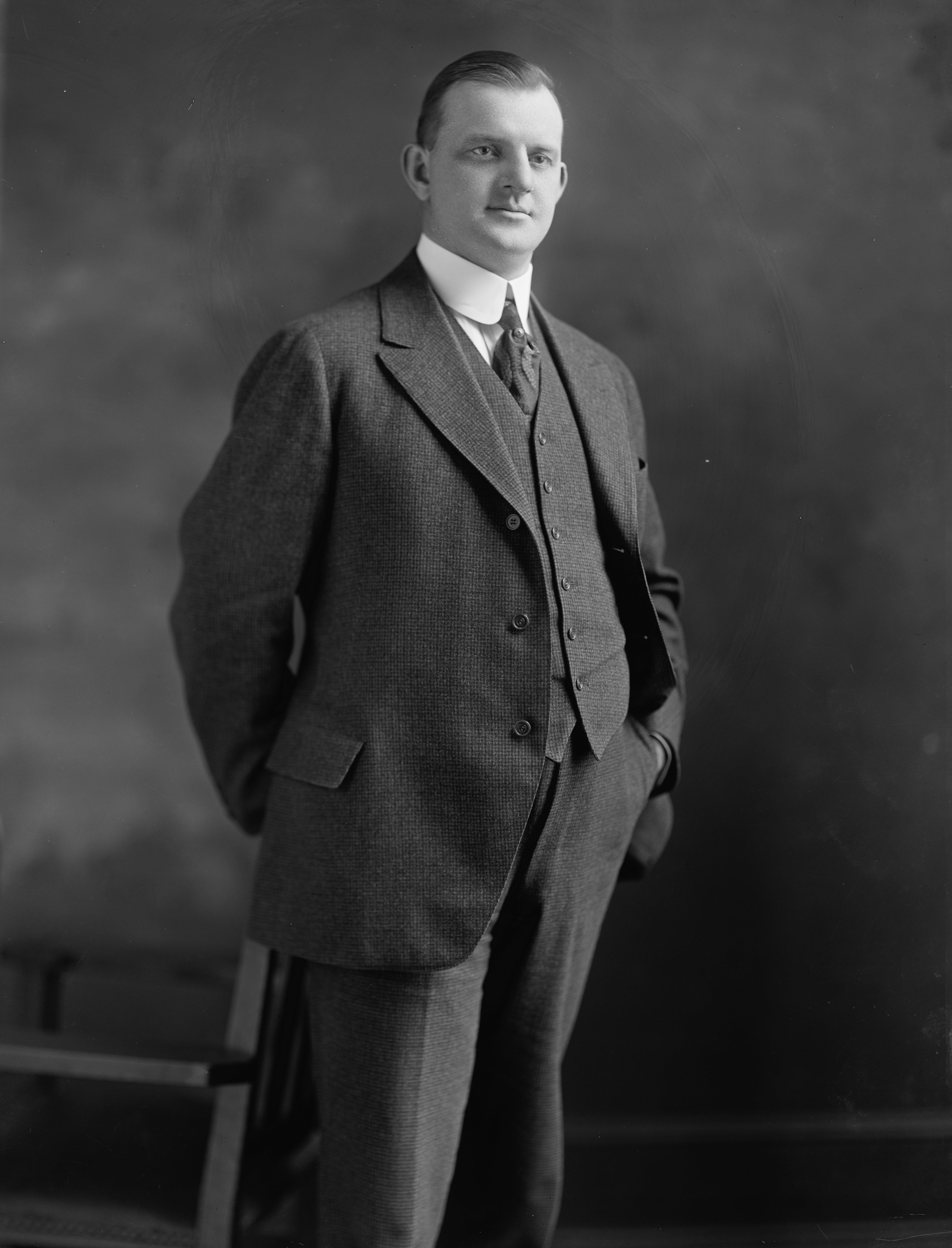
Carl Vinson served as a United States representative from Georgia from 1914 to 1965, the first person to serve for more than 50 years in the House of Representatives. He earned his law degree from Mercer in 1902, and is the namesake of the USS Carl Vinson, a nuclear-powered aircraft carrier.

==== U.S. senators ====
- Four Mercerians have served as United States senators, all from Georgia.
- Walter F. George – United States senator from Georgia, 1922–1957, served as president pro tempore, 1955–1957; namesake of Mercer's Law School
- Thomas W. Hardwick – United States senator from Georgia, 1915–1919; governor of Georgia, 1921–1923; as governor, appointed Rebecca L. Felton as the first female United States senator
- Thomas E. Watson – United States representative, Georgia's 10th Congressional district, 1891–1893; United States senator from Georgia, 1921–1922
- William S. West – United States senator from Georgia, 1914–1914

==== Governors ====
- Eleven Mercerians have served as governors: six of Georgia, two of Alabama, and one each of New Hampshire, Puerto Rico, and Texas.
- Ellis Arnall – governor of Georgia, 1943–1947
- Allen D. Candler – governor of Georgia, 1898–1902; United States representative, Georgia's 9th Congressional district, 1883–1891; namesake of Candler County, Georgia
- Nathan Deal – United States representative, Georgia's 9th Congressional district, 1993–2010; served as governor of Georgia 2011–2019
- Thomas W. Hardwick – United States senator from Georgia, 1915–1919; governor of Georgia, 1921–1923; as Governor, appointed Rebecca L. Felton as the first female United States senator
- Richard B. Hubbard – governor of Texas, 1876–1879; US ambassador to Japan, 1885–1889
- William D. Jelks – governor of Alabama, 1901–1907
- Henry Dickerson McDaniel – governor of Georgia, 1883–1886
- William J. Northen – governor of Georgia, 1890–1894; president, Southern Baptist Convention, 1899–1901; served as a Mercer trustee for 44 years, 1869–1913
- Chauncey Sparks – governor of Alabama, 1943–1947
- Meldrim Thomson, Jr. – governor of New Hampshire, 1973–1979
- Blanton Winship – governor of Puerto Rico (1934–1939)

==== U.S. representatives ====
- Twenty-one Mercerians have served as United States representatives; the most recent (as of 2021) was Scott Rigell of Virginia. Seventeen were from Georgia, three from Florida, and one from Virginia.
- Doug Barnard – United States representative, Georgia's 10th Congressional district, 1977–1993
- Allen D. Candler – governor of Georgia, 1898–1902; United States representative, Georgia's 9th Congressional district, 1883–1891; namesake of Candler County, Georgia
- Edward E. Cox – United States representative, Georgia's 2nd Congressional district, 1925–1952
- Martin J. Crawford – United States representative, Georgia's 2nd Congressional district, 1855–1861; representative to the Confederate Provisional Congress, 1861–1862; justice, Supreme Court of Georgia, 1880–1883
- Nathan Deal – United States representative, Georgia's 9th Congressional district, 1993–2010; served as governor of Georgia 2011–2019
- Robert W. Everett – United States representative, Georgia's 7th Congressional district, 1891–1893
- Phillip M. Landrum – United States representative, Georgia's 9th Congressional district, 1953–1977
- Thomas G. Lawson – United States representative, Georgia's 8th Congressional district, 1891–1897
- Rufus E. Lester – United States representative, Georgia's 1st Congressional district, 1889–1906
- Charles L. Moses – United States representative, Georgia's 4th Congressional district, 1891–1897
- James W. Overstreet – United States representative, Georgia's 1st Congressional district, 1906–1907 and 1917–1923
- Homer C. Parker – United States representative, Georgia's 1st Congressional district, 1931–1935
- Scott Rigell – United States representative, Virginia's 2nd Congressional district, 2011–2017
- Seaborn Roddenbery – United States representative, Georgia's 2nd Congressional district, 1910–1913
- Dwight L. Rogers – United States representative, Florida's 6th Congressional district, 1945–1954
- William J. Sears – United States representative, Florida's 4th Congressional district, 1915–1929; United States representative, an at-large Florida district, 1933–1937
- Malcolm C. Tarver – United States representative, Georgia's 7th Congressional district, 1927–1947
- Carl Vinson – United States representative for over 50 years, 1914–1965; long-time chairman, House Armed Services Committee; has been called the "patriarch of the armed services" and the "father of the two-ocean navy"; namesake of the USS Carl Vinson
- Thomas E. Watson – United States representative, Georgia's 10th Congressional district, 1891–1893; United States senator from Georgia, 1921–1922
- J. Mark Wilcox – United States representative, Florida's 4th Congressional district, 1933–1939
- John S. Wood – United States representative, Georgia's 9th Congressional district, 1931–1935 and 1945–1953; chairman, House Un-American Activities Committee, 1949–1953

==== Other ====
- Brad Bryant – superintendent of the Georgia public schools, one of Georgia's eight statewide executive officials, 2010–2011
- Cathy Cox – Georgia secretary of state, 1999–2007; first woman elected to this position
- Luis Eduardo Díaz Granados – Colombian representative
- Walter C. Dowling – United States ambassador to South Korea, 1956–1959; United States ambassador to Germany, 1959–1963
- Winfred Dukes – Georgia state representative
- Bobby Harshbarger – Tennessee state senator (2025-present)
- John Oxendine – Georgia insurance commissioner, 1995–2011
- John Peyton – mayor, Jacksonville, Florida, the most populous city in Florida and the thirteenth most populous in the United States, 2003–2011
- William Usery Jr. – United States Secretary of Labor, 1976–1977
- Julian Webb – member of the Georgia State Senate 1963–1974 and the Georgia Court of Appeals 1974–1979
- Samuel J. Welsch – member of the Georgia House of Representatives, the Georgia State Senate, and mayor of Marietta, Georgia.

=== Military ===
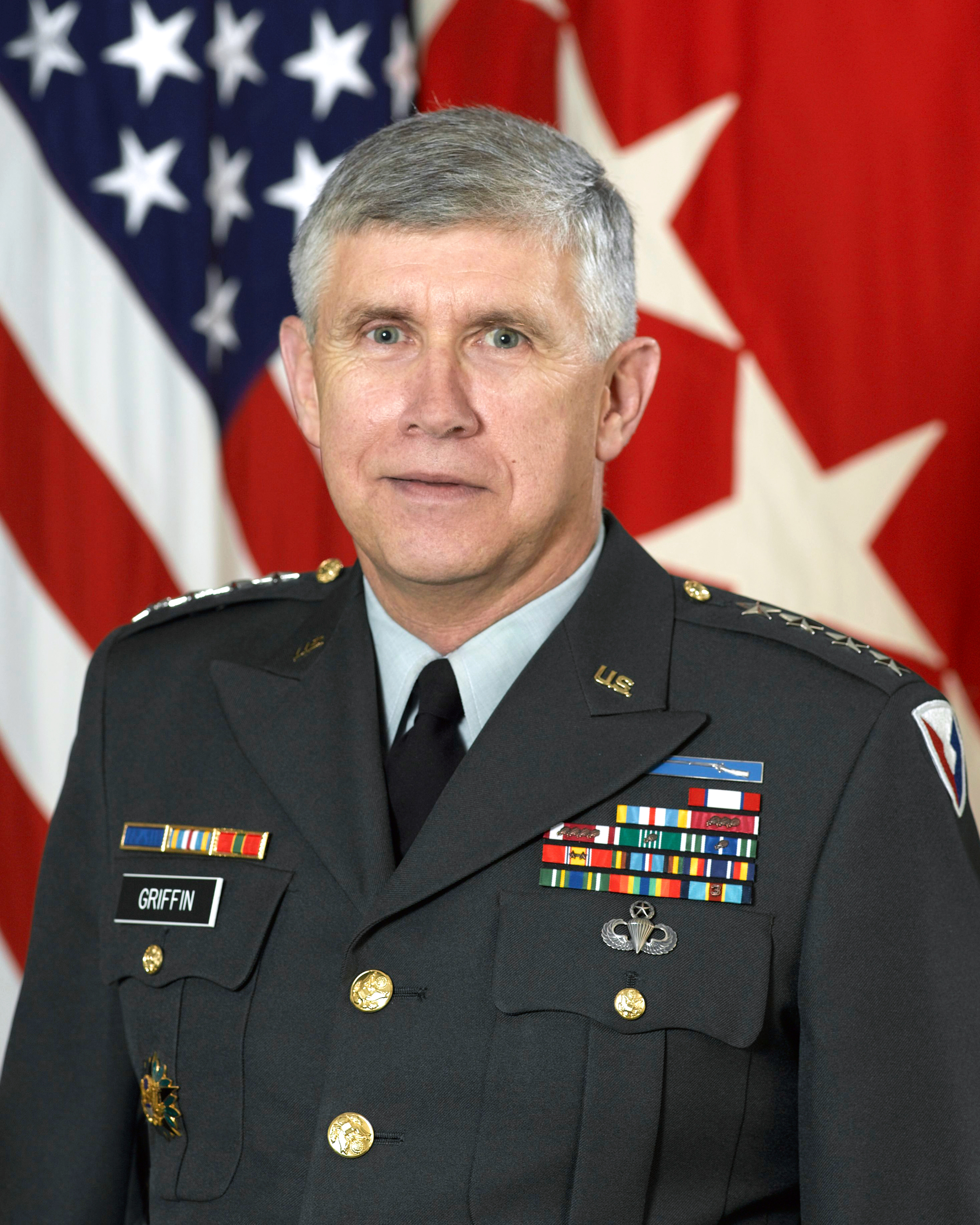
Benjamin S. Griffin served as a United States Army four-star general, and was the commanding general of United States Army Materiel Command from 2004 to 2008. He earned his Master of Business Administration degree from Mercer in 1981.

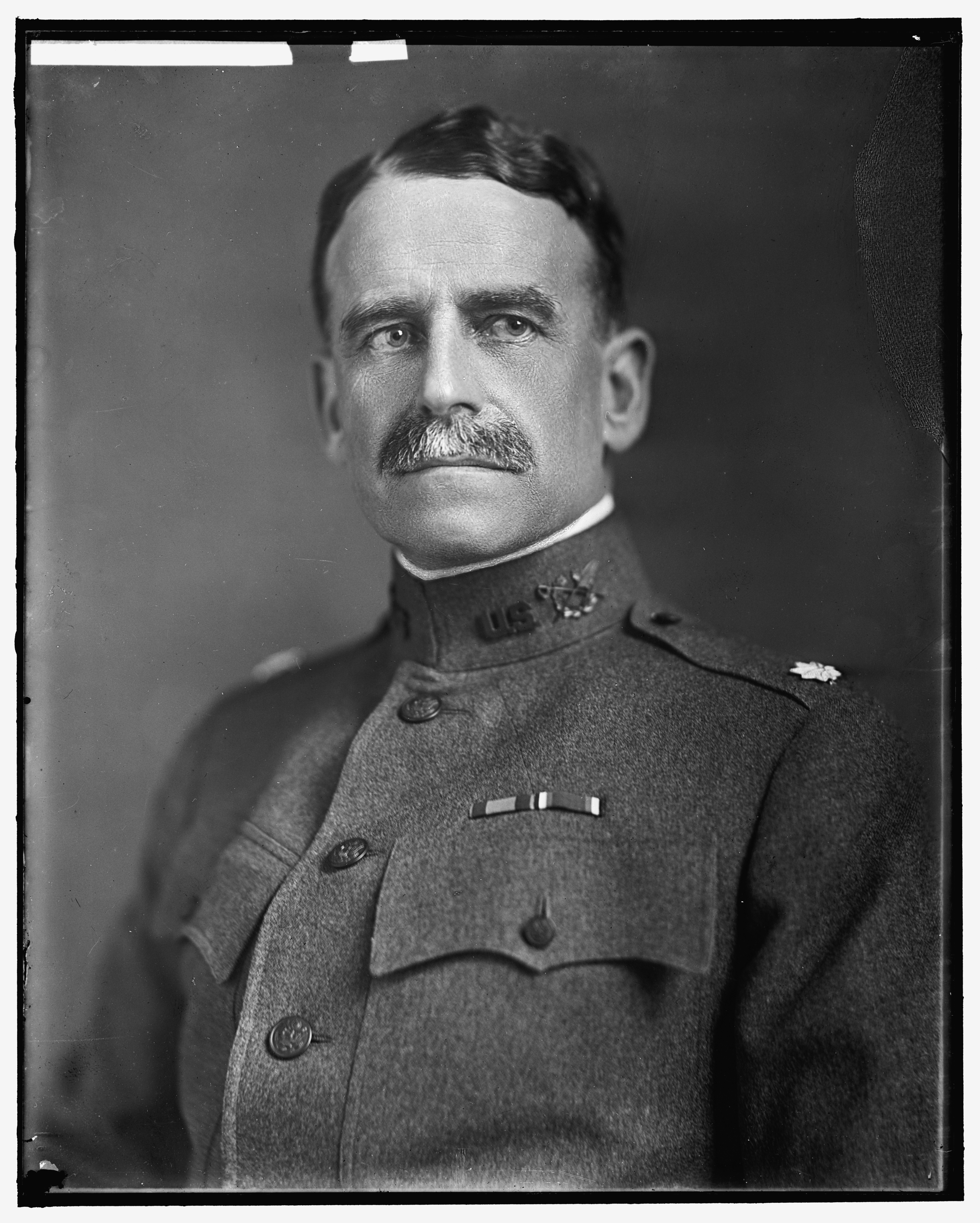
Blanton Winship served as the Judge Advocate General of the United States Army from 1931 to 1933 and as the governor of Puerto Rico from 1934 to 1939. He earned his undergraduate degree from Mercer in 1889.

- John Birch – missionary, U.S. Army intelligence officer, and OSS agent in China during World War II; namesake of the John Birch Society
- Benjamin S. Griffin, general, U.S. Army – commanding general, U.S. Army Materiel Command, 2004–08
- Richard E. Hawes, rear admiral, U.S. Navy – commanded several vessels during World War II; recipient of the Navy Cross; namesake of the USS Hawes
- Alexander T. Hawthorn, brigadier general, C.S. Army – commander, 4th Arkansas Infantry Brigade, 1863–65
- Claude M. Kicklighter, lieutenant general, U.S. Army – commanding general, United States Army, Pacific, 1989–91; after military retirement, served in senior civilian positions in the Department of Defense and Department of Veterans Affairs; assistant secretary, Department of Veterans Affairs, 2001–05; inspector general, Department of Defense, 2007–08
- George J. Walker, brigadier general, U.S. Army – assistant chief of staff for Intelligence, U.S. Army Forces Command, 1987–89; member, Military Intelligence Hall of Fame
- Perry L. Wiggins, lieutenant general, U.S. Army – commanding general, Fifth United States Army, 2013–present; commander, 1st Infantry Division and Fort Riley, 2008–09
- Blanton Winship, major general, U.S. Army – Judge Advocate General (TJAG), 1931–33; governor of Puerto Rico, 1934–39

=== Science ===
- Kevin Greenaugh – nuclear engineer, first African-American to earn a PhD in nuclear engineering from the University of Maryland College Park
- Godwin Maduka – MD and founder of Las Vegas Pain Institute and Medical Center

=== Other public service ===
- Ed Bacon – rector emeritus of All Saints Episcopal Church in Pasadena, California
- Betty Cantrell – Miss America 2016
- Louie D. Newton – influential Baptist minister; president, Southern Baptist Convention, 1947–1948; president, Georgia Baptist Convention, 1950–1951; pastor of Druid Hills Baptist Church in Atlanta for more than 40 years; namesake of Mercer's Newton Hall, a large chapel on the Macon campus
- Steadman V. Sanford – former chancellor, University System of Georgia; namesake of Sanford Stadium at the University of Georgia

=== Athletics ===
- Aldo Balsano – former goalkeeper for Mercer University's men's soccer team; member of U.S. Beach Soccer National Team (2013–2016); nominated to the National Soccer Hall of Fame in 2025
- Rob Belloir – former Major League Baseball infielder for the Atlanta Braves
- William Brennan – former Major League Baseball pitcher
- Cindy Brogdon – former basketball player who competed in the 1976 Summer Olympics
- Billy Burns – Major League Baseball outfielder in the New York Yankees organization
- Wally Butts – head football coach, University of Georgia (1939–1960), athletic director (1939–1963); member of the Georgia Sports Hall of Fame and the College Football Hall of Fame
- Jimmy Carnes – head track & field coach, Furman University (1962–1964), University of Florida (1965–1976), U.S. Olympic team (1980); founding president of USA Track & Field (1980–1984)
- Andrea Congreaves – women's basketball player in the WNBA and in Europe
- Wesley Duke – former tight end for the Denver Broncos, 2005 AFC West Champions
- Cory Gearrin – Major League Baseball pitcher for the New York Yankees
- Hilda M. Hankerson – high school basketball coach
- Big James Henderson – powerlifter who competed in the International Powerlifting Federation and won five world bench press titles (1994–1998)
- Kyle Lewis – Major League Baseball outfielder for the Seattle Mariners
- Mike Mimbs – former Major League Baseball pitcher for the Philadelphia Phillies
- Sam Mitchell – head coach, Toronto Raptors of the National Basketball Association (2004–2008); 2007 NBA Coach of the Year
- Joe Pettini – former Major League Baseball infielder and coach
- Bill Yoast – high school football coach made famous in the film Remember the Titans
