= James G. Pressly Stadium =

Stadium in Gainesville, Florida

James G. Pressly Stadium at Percy Beard Track
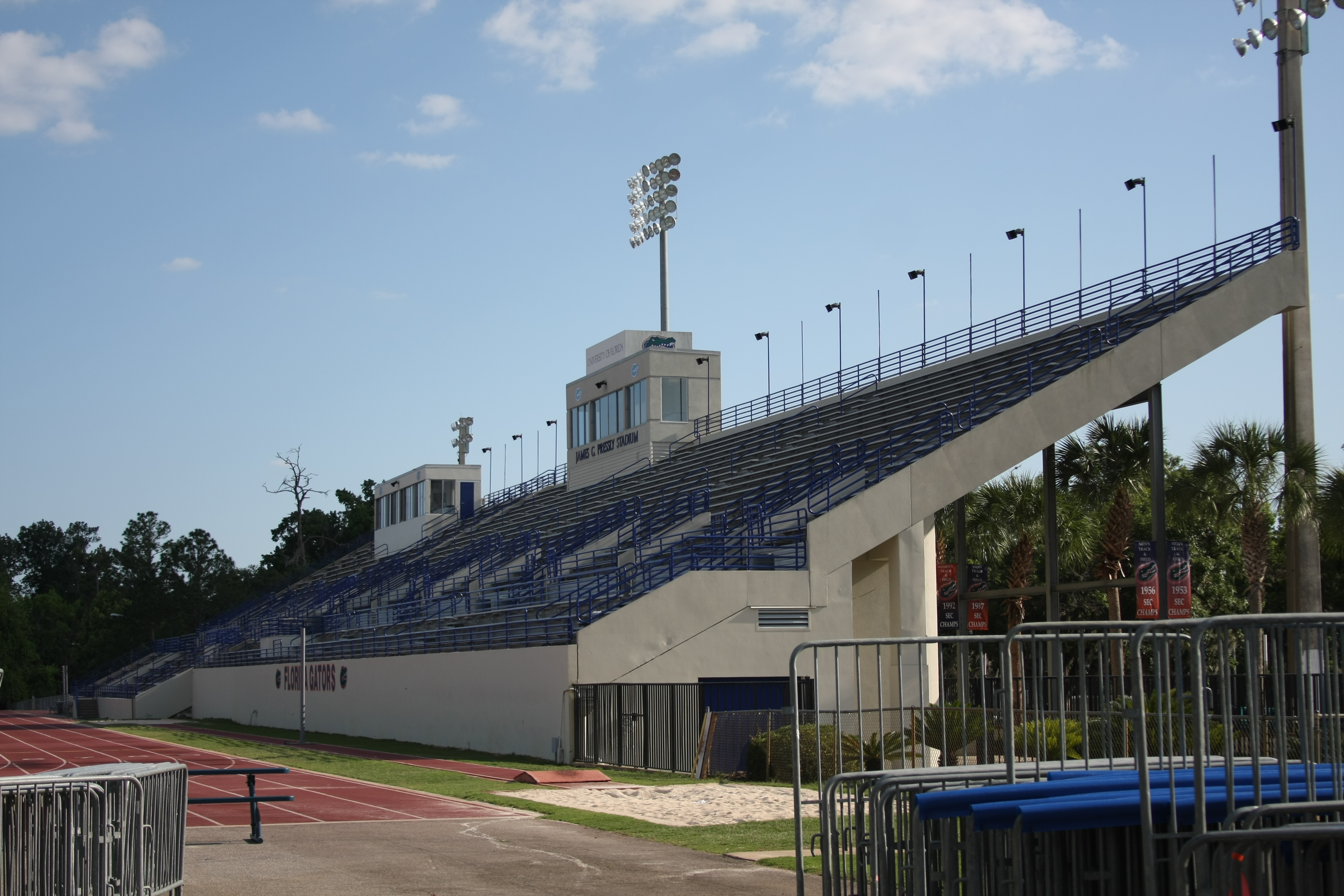
- Interactive map of James G. Pressly Stadium at Percy Beard Track
- Location: Gainesville, Florida
- Coordinates: 29.6493°N 82.355107°W
- Owner: University of Florida
- Operator: University Athletic Association
- Capacity: 4,500
- Surface: Natural Grass

Construction
- Renovated: 1995
- Expanded: 2007

Tenants
- Florida Gators women's soccer Florida Gators track and field

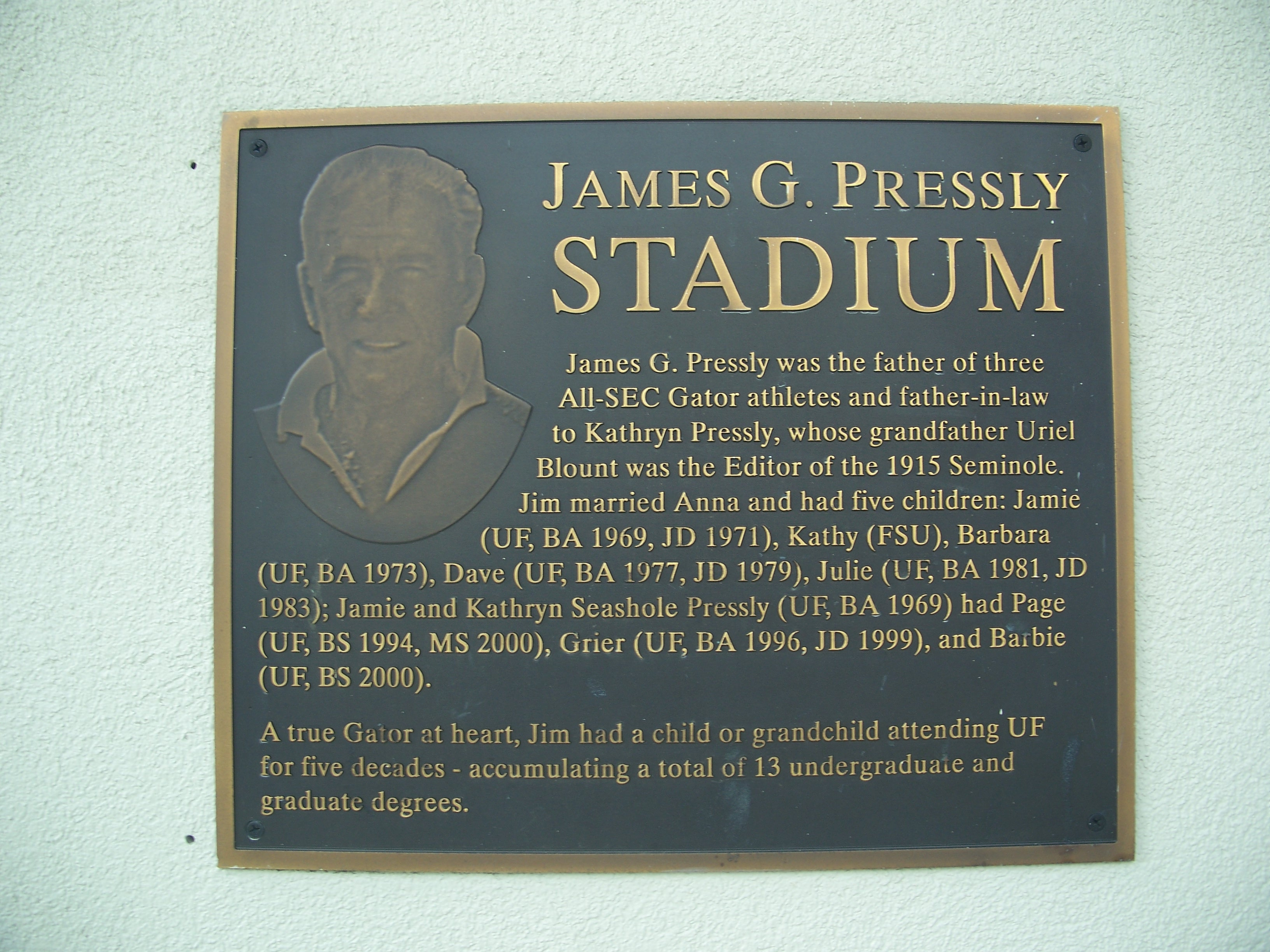
About James Pressly

The James G. Pressly Stadium at Percy Beard Track is a 4,500-seat dual-purpose stadium located on the University of Florida campus in Gainesville, Florida. The stadium is home to the Florida Gators women's soccer team and the men's and women's Florida Gators track and field teams. The facility was renamed in honor of university alumnus James G. Pressly, Jr. The track was named in honor of Percy Beard, a 1932 Olympic silver medalist and the former Gators track and field head coach for twenty-seven years.

In anticipation of the new Florida Gators soccer team, James G. Pressly Stadium was completed renovated in 1995. The stadium seating facilities and field received a $750,000 facelift and the pole vault and long jump pits were moved from the infield to outside of the Pearcy Beard Track. This move made the soccer field of the right proportions, and had an area of approximately 115 yards by seventy yards. Over 2,500 bench seats were added to the existing 2,000-seat concrete grandstand, bringing the total capacity to 4,500.

The Florida Gators soccer team ranked eighth overall in the nation for its 2007 total attendance of 16,889, or an average of 1,299 spectators per game.

== Images ==
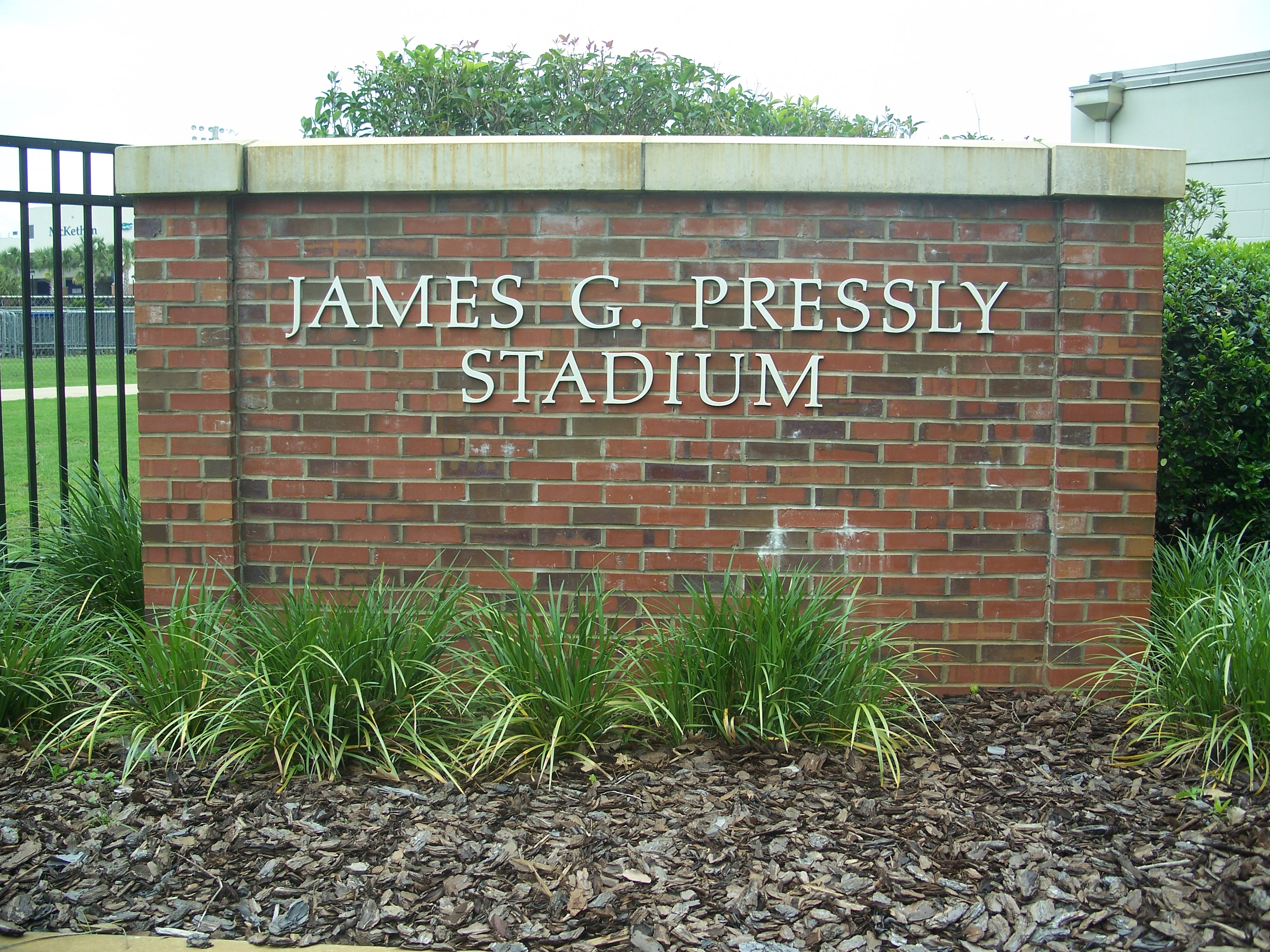
Front gate

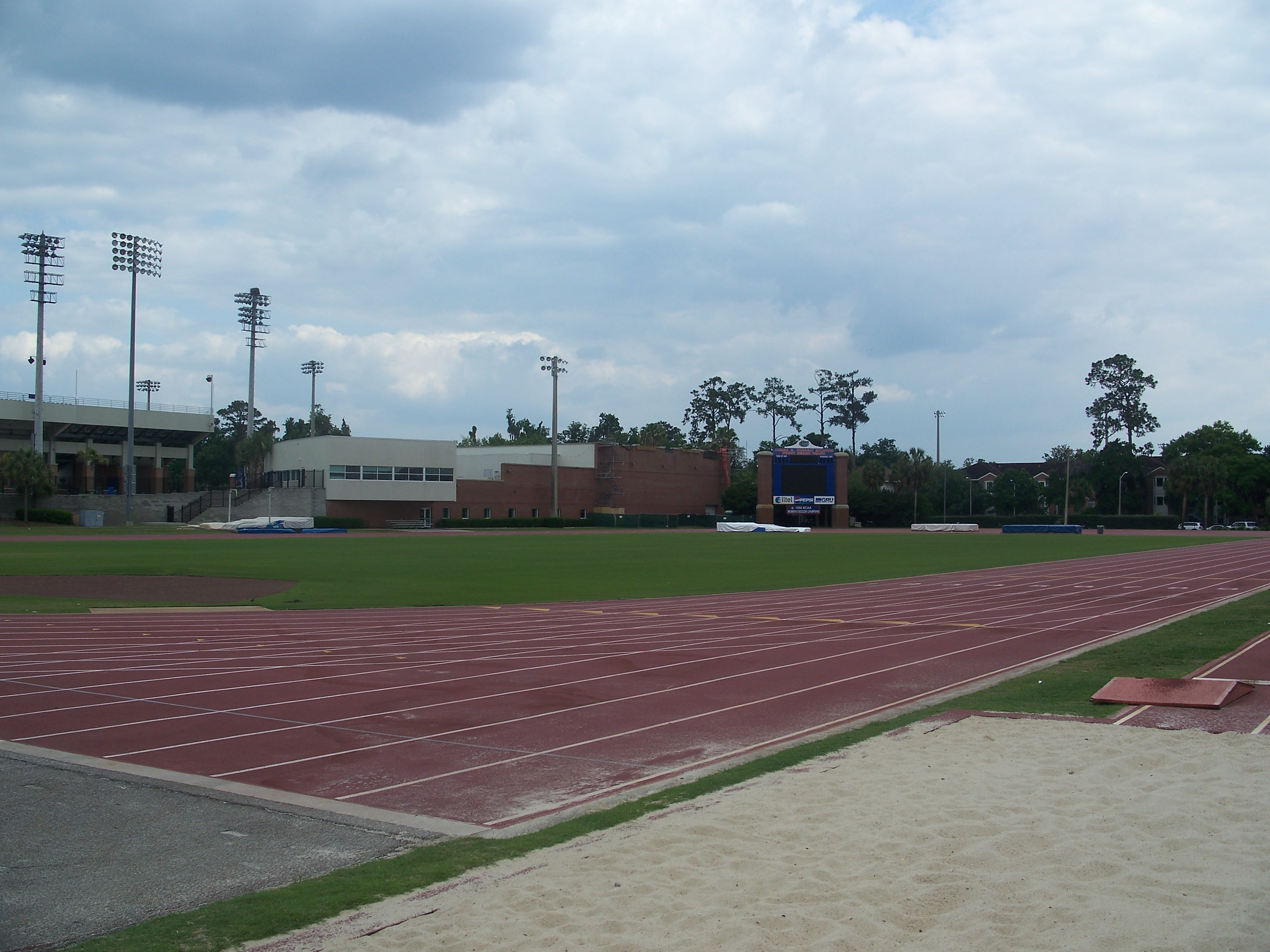
Percy Beard Track

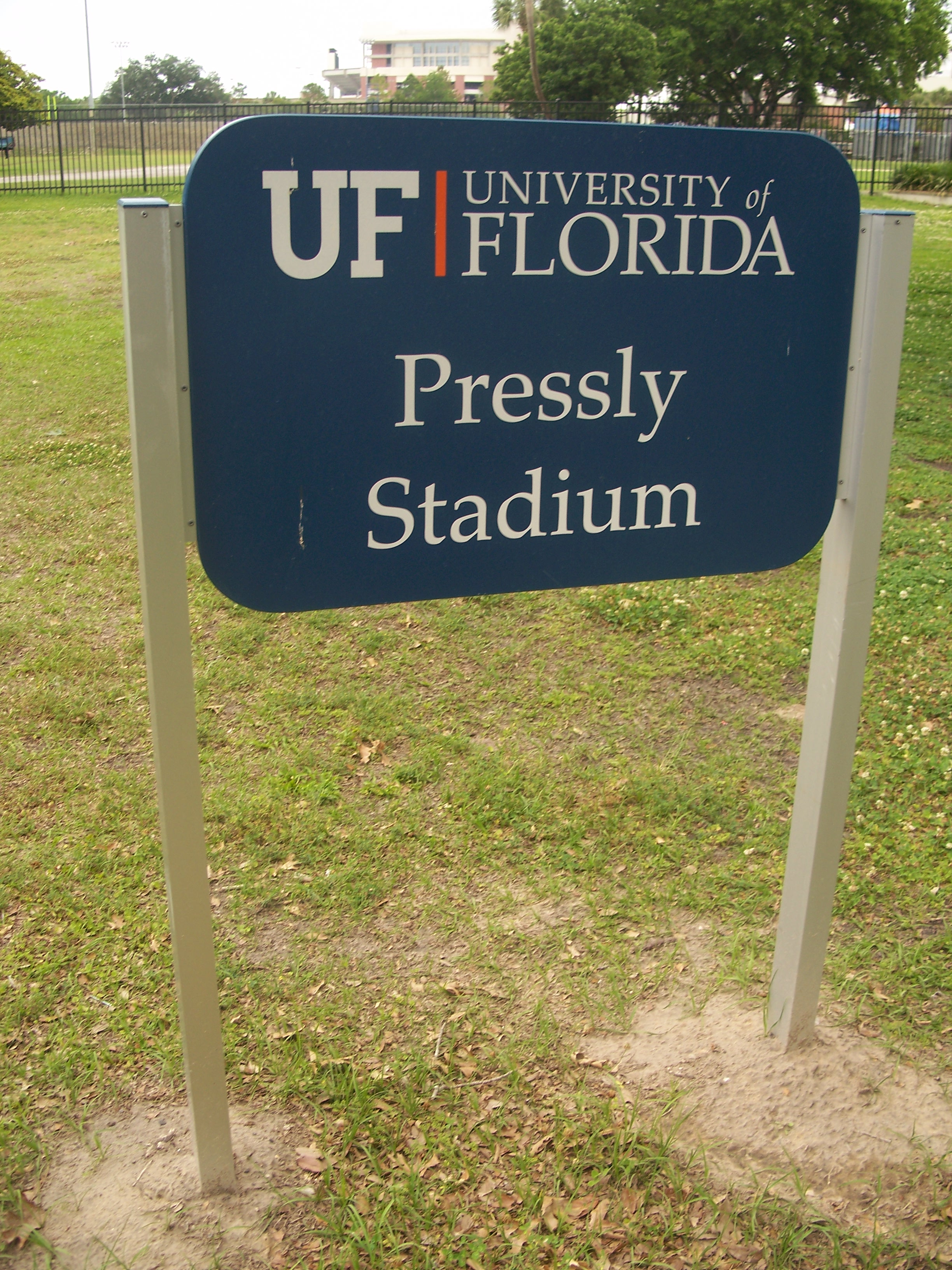
Stadium sign

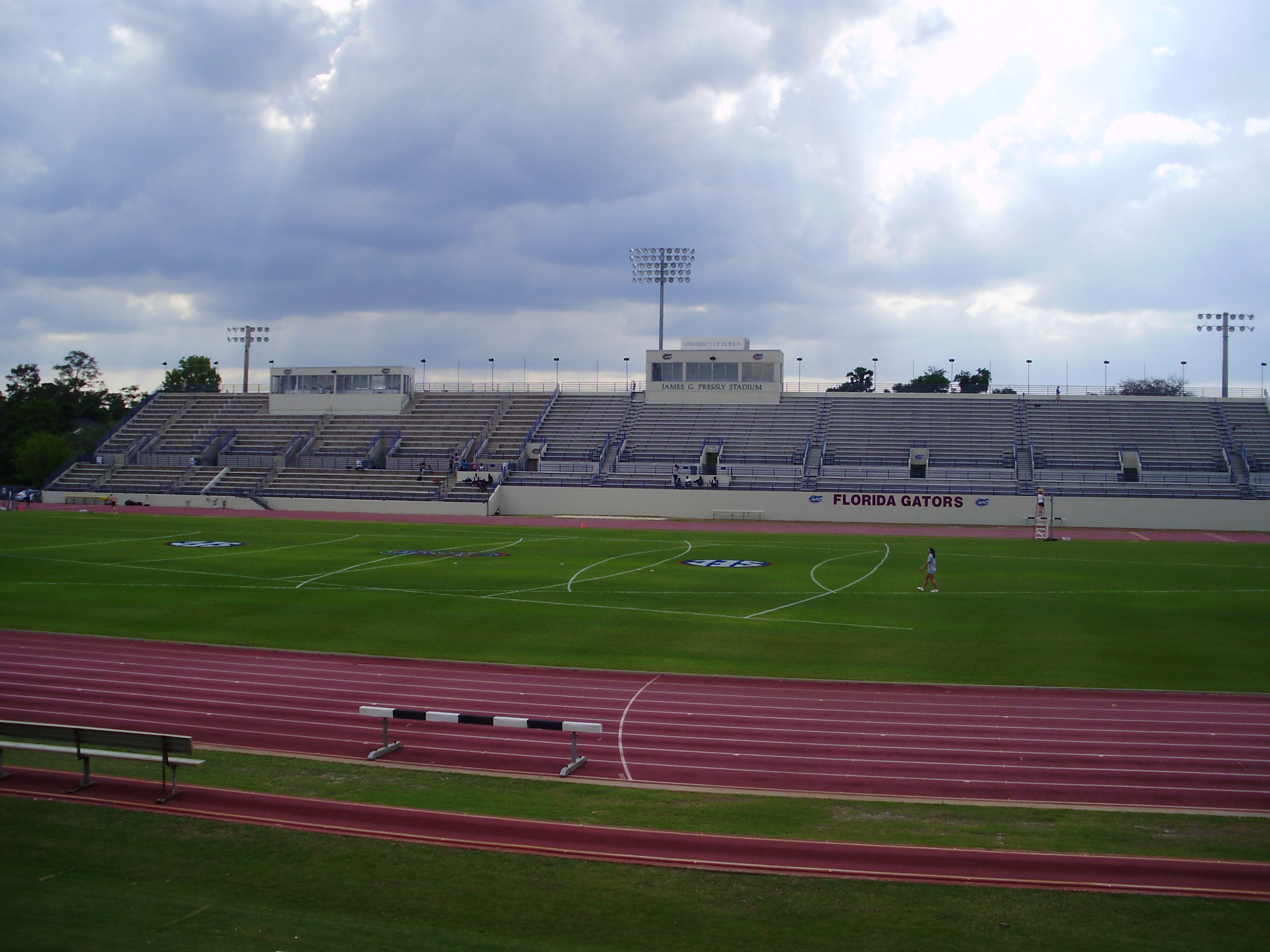
View from behind McKethan Stadium

== See also ==
- Becky Burleigh
- Florida Gators
- List of University of Florida buildings
- Mike Holloway
- University Athletic Association
