= Frank Shorter =

American long-distance runner (born 1947)

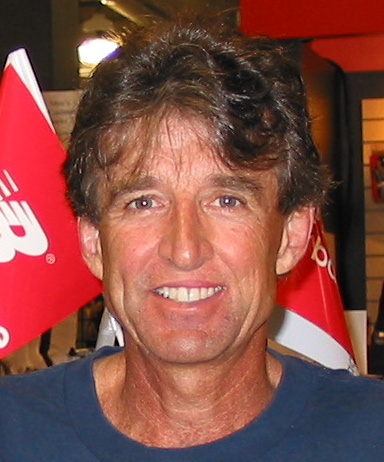
- Shorter in 2002

Personal information
- Full name: Frank Charles Shorter
- Nationality: United States
- Born: October 31, 1947 (age 79) Munich, Allied-occupied Germany
- Height: 5 ft 10 in (178 cm)
- Weight: 134 lb (61 kg)

Sport
- Sport: Long-distance running
- Events: Marathon, 10,000 meters
- College team: Yale
- Club: Florida Track Club

Achievements and titles
- Personal bests: 3000 meters: 7:51.4; 5000 meters: 13:26.62; 10,000 meters: 27:45.91; Marathon: 2:10:30
Medal record
Men's athletics
Representing United States
Olympic Games
Gold medal – first place	1972 Munich	Marathon
Silver medal – second place	1976 Montréal	Marathon
Pan American Games
Gold medal – first place	1971 Cali	Marathon
Gold medal – first place	1971 Cali	10,000 m
Bronze medal – third place	1979 San Juan	10,000 m

Frank Charles Shorter (born October 31, 1947) is an American former long-distance runner who won the gold medal in the marathon at the 1972 Summer Olympics and the silver medal at the 1976 Summer Olympics. His Olympic success, along with the achievements of other American runners, is credited with igniting the running boom in the United States during the 1970s.

== Early life and education ==
Frank Shorter was born in Munich, Germany, where his father, physician Samuel S. Shorter, served in the U.S. Army. He grew up in Middletown, New York, where a street was named in his honor (Frank Shorter Way). Frank Shorter Way was formerly part of the Orange Classic 10K course route, which Shorter won in its inaugural race in 1981. After earning his high school diploma from the Mount Hermon School in Gill, Massachusetts, in 1965, Shorter graduated from Yale University in New Haven, Connecticut, with a Bachelor of Arts degree (B.A.) in 1969, and the University of Florida College of Law in Gainesville, Florida, with a Juris Doctor degree (J.D.) in 1974.

In the October 2011 issue of Runner's World, an article by John Brant detailed the traumatic household life Frank and his siblings suffered at the hands of his extremely abusive father and the buckle end of his belt. With the publication of the Runner's World article, Shorter began to elaborate on stopping similar cycles of violence in more detail and in public.

== Running career ==
Shorter first achieved distinction by winning the 1969 National Collegiate Athletic Association (NCAA) six mile run title during his senior year at Yale. He won his first U.S. national titles in 1970 in the three mile and six mile events. He also was the U.S. national six mile/10,000 meter champion in 1971, 1974, 1975 and 1977.

After graduating from Yale, Shorter chose to pursue a Doctor of Medicine degree at the University of New Mexico. However, he dropped out after six weeks after classes began to impact his training regime. Soon, he moved to Florida to study for a Juris Doctor degree at the University of Florida in Gainesville because of the excellence of the environment and the opportunity to train with Jack Bacheler as members of the Florida Track Club (FTC), founded by Jimmy Carnes, then the head coach of the Florida Gators track and field team. Bacheler was regarded as America's best distance runner, having qualified for the finals of the 5,000-meter race at the 1968 Mexico City Olympics. The FTC's core nucleus of Shorter, Bacheler and Jeff Galloway qualified for the 1972 Olympics and their success made Gainesville the Mecca of distance running on the East Coast in the early 1970s.

Shorter won the U.S. national cross-country championships four times (1970–1973). He was the U.S. Olympic Trials champion in both the 10,000-meter run and the marathon in both 1972 and 1976. He also won both the 10,000-meter run and the marathon at the 1971 Pan American Games. Shorter was a four-time winner of the Fukuoka Marathon (1971–1974), generally recognized as the most prestigious marathon in the world at that time and held on a very fast course. His career best of 2:10:30 was set at that race on December 3, 1972. Several months later, on March 18, 1973, Shorter won the elite Lake Biwa Marathon in 2:12:03. He won the prestigious 7-mile Falmouth Road Race on Cape Cod in 1975 and 1976, the Virginia 10 Miler in 1975 (finishing in a tie with Bill Rodgers), and Atlanta's 10-kilometer Peachtree Road Race in 1977.

Shorter achieved his greatest recognition in the marathon, and he is the only American athlete to win two medals in the Olympic marathon. At the Munich Games—which coincidentally is Shorter's place of birth— he finished fifth in the 10,000-meter final, breaking the American record for the event that he had established in his qualifying heat. A few days later, he won the gold medal in the marathon. This ultimate achievement was marred by an imposter, West German student Norbert Sudhaus, who ran into Olympic Stadium ahead of Shorter. Shorter was not bothered by the silence from the crowd who had been duped into thinking that he was running for the silver medal. Shorter was confident that he was going to win the gold medal because he knew that no competing runner had passed him. He received the James E. Sullivan Award afterwards as the top amateur athlete in the United States. At the 1976 Summer Olympics in Montreal, Shorter dropped out of the 10,000 meters in order to concentrate exclusively on the marathon, winning the silver medal in the marathon and finishing behind previously unheralded Waldemar Cierpinski of East Germany. Cierpinski was later implicated as a part of the state-sponsored doping program by East German track and field research files uncovered by Werner Franke at the Stasi headquarters in Leipzig in the late 1990s. There were suspicions about other East German athletes during the Montreal Olympics, including the East German women's swimming team led by Kornelia Ender; the East German women won eleven of the thirteen events.

From 2000 to 2003, Shorter was the chairman of the United States Anti-Doping Agency, a body that he helped to establish.

Shorter was featured as a prominent character, played by Jeremy Sisto, in the 1998 film Without Limits. The film follows the life of Shorter's contemporary, training partner, Olympic teammate and sometime rival, Steve Prefontaine. Shorter was the next to last person to see Prefontaine alive before he died in an automobile accident.

Shorter was inducted into the United States Olympic Hall of Fame in 1984, the USA National Track and Field Hall of Fame in 1989, and the National Distance Running Hall of Fame in 1998.

Previously a long-time resident of Boulder, Colorado, Shorter co-founded the Bolder Boulder in 1979. The annual 10k race is a popular Memorial Day event, which culminates with a tribute to U.S. Armed Forces at Folsom Field at the University of Colorado. A life-size bronze statue of Shorter stands outside the stadium.

In 2021, Shorter and his wife, Michelle Cox, moved to Falmouth, Massachusetts.

== Track & field news rankings ==
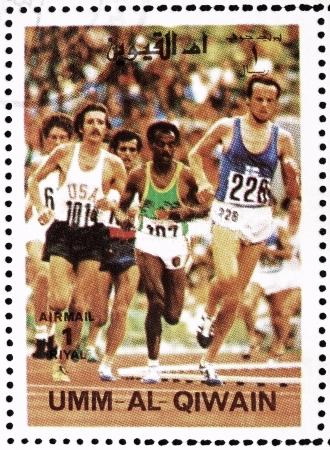
Shorter (left) running 10,000 m at the 1972 Olympics, stamp of Umm al-Quwain

=== World rankings ===
Marathon

- 1971 – 1st
- 1972 – 1st
- 1973 – 1st
- 1974 – 2nd
- 1976 – 2nd

10,000 m

- 1970 – 2nd
- 1972 – 5th
- 1974 – 5th
- 1975 – 2nd

5000 m

- 1975 – 10th

=== U.S. rankings ===
Marathon

- 1971 – 1st
- 1972 – 1st
- 1973 – 1st
- 1974 – 1st
- 1976 – 1st

10,000 m

- 1969 – 3rd
- 1970 – 1st
- 1971 – 1st
- 1972 – 1st
- 1973 – 5th
- 1974 – 1st
- 1975 – 1st
- 1976 – 2nd
- 1977 – 1st
- 1979 – 3rd

5000 m

- 1969 – 6th
- 1970 – 2nd
- 1971 – 4th
- 1972 – 10th
- 1973 – 7th
- 1974 – 4th
- 1975 – 3rd
- 1976 – 5th
- 1977 – 7th

== Personal records ==
- 2 miles - 8:26.2 (1971)
- 3 miles – 12:52.0 (1974)
- 5000 meters – 13:26.60 (1977)
- 10,000 meters – 27:45.91 (1975)
- Marathon (42.195 km) – 2:10:30 (1972)

== See also ==
- List of Levin College of Law graduates
- List of University of Florida alumni
- List of University of Florida Olympians
- List of Yale University people
