= Florida Gators cross country =

- Founded: 1935 (men); 1980 (women)
- University: University of Florida
- Athletic director: Scott Stricklin
- Head coach: Mike Holloway (4th season)
- Conference: SEC
- Location: Gainesville, Florida, US
- Course: Mark Bostick Golf Course
- Nickname: Gators
- Colors: Orange and blue

Men's NCAA appearances
- 1979, 1986, 1990, 1993, 1997, 2004, 2005, 2006, 2011, 2013

Women's NCAA appearances
- 1981, 1994, 1995, 1997, 1998, 1999, 2006, 2007, 2009, 2010, 2012, 2018, 2023, 2024, 2025

Men's conference champions
- 1955, 1986, 1987

Women's conference champions
- 1984, 1996, 1997, 2009, 2010, 2012, 2023, 2025

The Florida Gators cross country program represents the University of Florida in the sport of cross country running. The program includes separate men's and women's cross country teams, both of which compete in National Collegiate Athletic Association (NCAA) Division I and the Southeastern Conference (SEC). The men's cross country team officially started in 1935; the women's team began in 1980.

== Notable athletes ==
Men's All-Americans
Year	Name
1976	Robert Blount
1983	Keith Brantly
1986	Mike Bilyeu
1986	Mike Blaney
1990	Dan Middleman
1991	Nike Mykytok
2008	Jeremy Criscione
2025	Kelvin Cheruiyot

Women's All-Americans
Year	Name
1982	Beth Farmer
1982	Shelly Steely
1983	Beth Farmer
1984	Shelly Steely
1990	Wendy Frazier
1991	Coralena Velsen
1995	Becki Wells
2009	Rebecca Lowe
2009	Charlotte Browning
2013	Agata Strausa
2018	Jessica Pascoe
2021	Parker Valby
2022	Parker Valby
2023	Parker Valby
2023	Flomena Asekol
2024	Hilda Olemomoi
2025	Hilda Olemomoi
2025	Judy Chepkoech
2025	Tia Wilson

=== Women's individual national championships ===
Women's individual national champions
Year	Name
2023	Parker Valby

=== Women's individual conference champions ===
Women's individual conference champions
Year	Name	Conference
1984	Shelly Steely	
1986	Tricia Clifford	SEC
1995	Becki Wells	SEC
1996	Becki Wells	SEC
2009	Rebecca Lowe	SEC
2018	Jessica Pascoe	SEC
2022	Parker Valby	SEC
2023	Parker Valby	SEC

=== Men's individual conference champions ===
Men's individual conference champions
Year	Name	Conference
1967	Frank Lagotic	SEC
1983	Keith Brantly	SEC
1995	Don Gagon	SEC
2025	Kelvin Cheruiyot	SEC
2026	Kelvin Cheruiyot	SEC

Olympians
Athlete	Olympics	Event	Place
Keith Brantley (United States)	1996	Marathon	28th
Dan Middleman (United States)	1996	10,000m	38th
Parker Valby (United States)	2024	10,000m	11th

== Year by year results ==
	Men's			Women's		
Year	Conference finish	NCAA finish	Points	Conference finish	NCAA finish	Points
SEC Conference
1975	T3rd					
1976	5th					
1977	5th					
1978	4th					
1979	3rd	24th				
1980	3rd					
1981	4th				7th	
1982	2nd					
1983	2nd			2nd		
1984	2nd			1st		
1985	3rd			6th		
1986	1st	8th		3rd		
1987	1st			3rd		
1988	5th			3rd		
1989	6th			4th		
1990	3rd	6th		5th		
1991	4th			6th		
1992	4th			4th		
1993	4th	21st		4th		
1994	5th			4th	20th	
1995	4th			3rd	12th	
1996	7th			1st		
1997	3rd	22nd		1st	16th	
1998	3rd			2nd	22nd	
1999	4th			2nd	31st	
2000	3rd			4th		
2001	4th			3rd		
2002	3rd			6th		
2003	3rd			8th		
2004	2nd	27th		4th		
2005	3rd	23rd		5th		
2006	2nd	22nd		4th	26th	
2007	2nd			4th	11th	
2008	4th			2nd	17th	454
2009	4th			1st	7th	260
2010	3rd			1st	29th	635
2011	2nd	30th	780	3rd		
2012	5th			1st	23rd	518
2013	4th	29th	654	2nd		
2014	10th			7th		
2015	7th			7th		
2016	8th			8th		
2017	10th			13th		
2018	8th			2nd	16th	455
2019	6th			11th		
2020	7th			9th		
2021	7th			6th		
2022	10th			5th		
2023	7th			1st	5th	268
2024	12th			3rd	12th	357
2025	11th			1st	5th	225
2026	4th			2nd		

== See also ==
- Florida Gators
- Florida Gators track and field
- History of the University of Florida
- List of University of Florida Athletic Hall of Fame members
- List of University of Florida Olympians
- University Athletic Association
