= Mike Holloway =

American college track and field coach (born 1959)

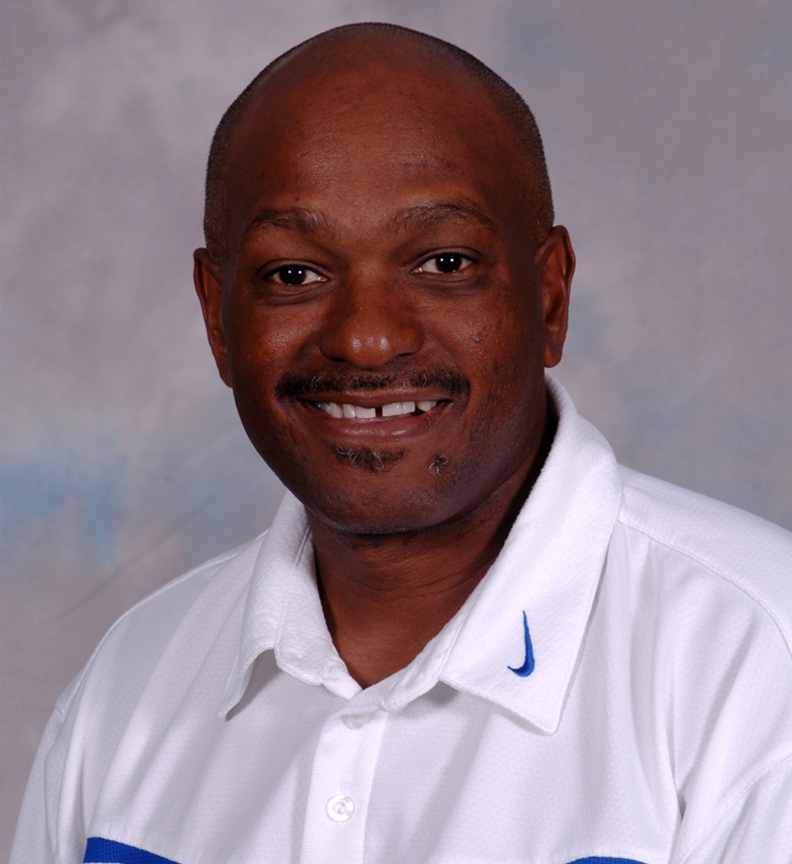

Current position
- Title: Head coach
- Team: Florida
- Conference: SEC

Biographical details
- Born: c. 1959 (age 66–67)

Coaching career (HC unless noted)
- 2003–present: Gators track and field
- 2003–present: Gators cross country
- 2012: U.S. Olympic Team (Asst.)

Accomplishments and honors

Championships
- NCAA Men's Indoor Track and Field Championship (2010, 2011, 2012, 2018, 2019); NCAA Men's Outdoor Track and Field Championship (2012, 2013, 2016, 2017, 2022, 2023, 2024); SEC Men's Indoor Track and Field Championship (2004, 2011, 2015, 2019); SEC Men's Outdoor Track and Field Championship (2010, 2015, 2018); NCAA Women's Indoor Track and Field Championship (2022); SEC Women's Indoor Track and Field Championship (2010, 2012, 2014); NCAA Women's Outdoor Track and Field Championship (2022); SEC Women's Outdoor Track and Field Championship (2009, 2018, 2022)

Awards
- USTFCCCA Indoor Coach of the Year (2010, 2011, 2012); USTFCCCA Outdoor Coach of the Year (2012, 2013, 2016); SEC Men's Indoor Coach of the Year (2004, 2011, 2015); SEC Men's Outdoor Coach of the Year (2010, 2015); SEC Women's Indoor Coach of the Year (2010, 2012); SEC Women's Outdoor Coach of the Year (2009)

Michael Dwayne Holloway (born c. 1959) is an American college track and field coach. Holloway is the current head coach of the Florida Gators track and field and Gators cross country programs of the University of Florida. He is best known for leading the Florida Gators men's indoor track and field team to five National Collegiate Athletic Association (NCAA) Division I national championships in 2010, 2011, 2012, 2018, and 2019. Additionally, the Florida Gators men's outdoor track and field teams won the NCAA Division I national championship in 2012, 2013, 2016, 2017, 2022, 2023, and 2024 under Holloway's leadership. In 2022, he led the women's indoor track and field team to its second national title and first in 30 years. Also in 2022, Holloway's Gators won a double NCAA title team slam, winning the 2022 men's outdoor track and field NCAA championship as well as the 2022 women's outdoor track and field NCAA championship, the first in program history.

After taking over the Florida program in 2002, he has been recognized as one of the top track and field coaches in the country. As the track head coach, he has produced twelve individual national champions; twenty-three All-Americans; and eighty-nine All-America Honors. As the cross country head coach, he produced twelve individual national champions; forty-seven All-Americans; and 141 All-America Honors. Following the Gators' 2010 and 2011 NCAA Men's Indoor Track and Field Championship, Holloway was named the U.S. Track & Field and Cross Country Coaches Association (USTFCCCA) national indoor track and field coach of the year.

Before becoming the head coach of the men's track and field team at Florida after the 2002 outdoor season, he was the assistant coach from 1995 to 2002, and the head coach of the track team at Buchholz High School in Gainesville. Since 2007, he has been the head coach of both the Gators men's and women's track and field teams, the first coach to lead both teams. Holloway graduated from the University of Florida with a bachelor's degree in history in 2000. His hometown is Columbus, Ohio.

In February 2011, Holloway was named as an assistant coach for the U.S. track and field team for the 2012 Olympics; he will work with the U.S. sprinters and hurdlers. Was USA track and field Men's Head Coach for the 2013 IAAF World Track and Field championship held in Moscow, Russia.

== See also ==
- Florida Gators
- History of the University of Florida
- List of University of Florida Olympians
- University Athletic Association
