= Luis Eduardo Díaz Granados =

Colombian businessman and politician

Senator of Colombia
- Incumbent
- Assumed office 20 July 2018

Member of the Colombian Chamber of Representatives from Atlántico
- In office 20 July 2010 – 19 July 2018

Personal details
- Born: 15 July 1970 (age 56) Barranquilla, Colombia
- Party: Radical Change
- Spouse: María Margarita Amarís
- Education: Mercer University

Luis Eduardo Díaz Granados Torres (born 15 July 1970) is a Colombian businessman and politician, currently serving in the Senate of Colombia. He was previously elected to two terms in the Chamber of Representatives.
