= Attorney General Griffin =

Attorney General Griffin may refer to:

- John Bowes Griffin (1903–1992), Attorney General of Hong Kong
- Trevor Griffin (politician) (1940–2015), Attorney General of South Australia
