= Jack Bacheler =

American long-distance runner

Personal information
- Full name: Jack Strangl Bacheler
- National team: United States
- Born: December 30, 1943 (age 82) Washington, D.C.
- Height: 6 ft 7 in (2.01 m)
- Weight: 170 lb (77 kg)

Sport
- Sport: Track and field
- Events: 5000 metres, marathon
- College team: Miami University
- Club: Florida Track Club

Jack Strangl Bacheler (born December 30, 1943) is an American former long-distance runner and two-time U.S. Olympian (5,000 meters in 1968 Mexico City Olympics, and Marathon in 1972 Munich Olympics). Born in Washington, District of Columbia, Bacheler was a founding member of the Florida Track Club at Gainesville, Florida in the late 1960s, and personally designed the club's distinctive "orange" logo. Standing 6 feet 7 inches, yet weighing only 165 pounds, he towered over most of his competitors. Now living in Clayton, North Carolina, he is married to Patricia Bacheler. Bacheler has two children, daughter Teresa (Teri), and son Matthew (Matt).

== Early running career ==
Bacheler grew up in Birmingham, Michigan and grew quickly: he was 6 foot 5 inches in the 10th grade at Birmingham's Seaholm High. Because of his height he played basketball at Seaholm High School, but found in his senior year that he excelled more in cross country and track. At the start of his senior year he tried out for the Cross Country team, much to the surprise of the school's legendary track coach Kermit Ambrose (Seaholm's coach 1952–1967). His basketball coach thought Bacheler was only running to get in shape for the winter basketball season, but, as Bacheler later confided to Sports Illustrated magazine, he discovered he enjoyed running. After his second X-country meet, he was Seaholm's number one runner. He competed in track for the first time in the spring of his senior year and qualified for the Michigan state championships where he finished third in the mile with a time of 4:28. That was sufficient to earn him an athletic grant-in-aid to attend Miami University.

At Miami University in Ohio, Bacheler competed in the Mid-American Conference (the MAC). Following the end of his sophomore year he competed in the U.S. Olympic trials in the summer of 1964, where he finished in eleventh place (out of 13 runners) in the 3,000 meter Steeplechase. As a member of the [then] Redskins team, he earned All-America honors at Miami by finishing seventh in the NCAA Cross Country Championship in fall 1964, and again in spring 1966 by placing second in the steeplechase in the NCAA outdoor Track and Field Championships. He also captured the three-mile run in the Mid-American Conference Track and Field Championships in both 1965 and 1966 and helped lead the Redskins to the All-Ohio and MAC Cross Country Championships in 1965. He broke the school record in the 3-mile run, which had been held by Bob Schul, who won the 5,000 meters at the 1964 Summer Olympics in Tokyo. The metric 5,000 is only slightly longer than 3 miles. He graduated in 1966 and, in 1981, he was inducted into the Miami Hall of Fame: at that time he was the only Miamian to have participated in two Olympics as an athlete.

Bacheler then left Ohio and moved to Gainesville, Florida where he obtained a research assistantship that allowed him to pursue post-graduate studies in entomology at the University of Florida, eventually earning a master's degree (with his thesis, The Biology of a Anthocorid Flower Bug) and, later, a doctorate. The track coach at the University of Florida, Jimmy Carnes, had recently created an administrative entity he called the Florida Track Club, as a means of allowing runners to continue competing even though they were not on the college team. The use of a "track club" was common practice by college coaches, however there was no formal club organization until 1968, when Coach Carnes asked some of the running community in Gainesville to raise some cash to fund travel for club members. Once a true club was created, Bacheler was inspired to design the club's famous Florida "orange" logo, to give Florida Track Club members their own identity. That same year, Bacheler trained for a spot on the U.S. track team going to the 1968 Summer Olympics in Mexico City, where the high altitude and thinner air would present a challenge to distance runners.

== 1968 Mexico City Olympics ==
In the lead-up to the 1968 Olympics, Bacheler ran twice a day, seven days per week, averaging 12-to-14 miles per day, largely training on his own in the heat and humidity of central Florida. Prior to the U.S. Trials, he competed in only six outdoor track meets, running a personal best of 4:04.2 in the mile in April. Because the 1968 Summer Olympics were being held at relatively high altitude, and late in the year (late September), the United States adopted an unusual two-part qualifying program for its Track & Field team. Athletes would compete in Los Angeles in late June, and the top finishers would then advance to a high altitude competition to be held at South Lake Tahoe, California in July. Bacheler qualified for the altitude-training squad with a time of 14:00.4 in the 5,000 meters at Los Angeles. At South Lake Tahoe he appeared to be less impacted by the altitude than most; Bacheler said he was accustomed to the difficulty of running in Gainesville in the summer, when it is extremely humid. In the Trials final he surprised by finishing in a virtual tie with Bob Day for first place.

At Mexico City, he finished fourth in his qualifying heat and was the only American to qualify for the final. One year later he said he felt so good in the qualifying race that he thought he could place in the top 5 in the finals. As it turned out, five of the first six finishers (all but Ron Clarke of Australia) were from high-altitude countries.

Unfortunately, he came down with dysentery on the day of the 5,000 final and was unable to compete.

== 1972 Munich Olympics ==
Three months prior to the 1972 U.S. Olympic Trials, Bacheler, along with Florida Track Club teammates Frank Shorter and Jeff Galloway, moved to Vail, Colorado to train at altitude. Each of the trio planned to compete in both the 10,000 meters and the Marathon at the Trials, which were to be held at the University of Oregon in Eugene. In the finals of the 10,000, the three FTC runners were running first, second and third, but Bacheler faltered on the final lap and (to the delight of the crowd) he was passed by a Eugene native, Jon Anderson. On the final day of the Trials, the FTC trio again dominated in the marathon. Frank Shorter and Kenny Moore crossed the finish line together in a time of 2:15:57.8. Behind them, Jeff Galloway, having already secured a spot on the team in the 10K, helped to pace Bacheler and magnanimously eased up near the finish line so that it would be clear to the officials that Bacheler had finished third(2:20:29.2), earning an automatic spot on the marathon team with Frank Shorter and Kenny Moore.

Although the Munich marathon course was essentially flat, temperatures were just over 80 °F (27 °C). The race was run on Sunday, September 10 and started at 3 pm. Shorter won in near Olympic record time of 2:12:19.8, Moore finished fourth (2:15:39.8), and Bacheler who had faded from fifth place in the final miles, crossed the line in ninth place (2:17:38.2).

Between Olympic performances Bacheler captured National AAU Championships in cross country and the 10,000 meters in 1969 and the six-mile run in 1970 while running for the Florida Track Club. Of note, Jack ran a 5,000-meter race on the University of Florida track in 1970, winning in a time of 13:41.4, which remains the track record in Gainesville (as of April 2015). He received his Ph.D. in entomology in 1972, and worked as a postdoc in the Entomology Department at North Carolina State University until 1976, when he became an assistant professor. In 1972, he became an associate professor. Bacheler continued his association with running by working with the distance runners. In 1979 and 1980 he coached the NCSU women's cross country team to the AIAW National Championships.
