= Jimmy Carnes =

American athlete (1934–2011)

Biographical details
- Born: November 29, 1934; Eatonton, Georgia, U.S.
- Died: March 5, 2011 (aged 76); Gainesville, Florida, U.S.

Playing career
- 1952–1956: Mercer University
- Positions: Basketball; Track and field

Coaching career (HC unless noted)
- 1956–1962: Druid Hills High School
- 1962–1964: Furman University
- 1965–1976: University of Florida
- 1976: U.S. Olympic Team (Asst.)
- 1980: U.S. Olympic Team

Administrative career (AD unless noted)
- 1980–1984: U.S. Track & Field Fed'n (Pres.)

Head coaching record
- Overall: 161–11 (.936)

Accomplishments and honors

Championships
- 2 SoCon Indoor (1962, 1963); 2 SoCon Outdoor (1962, 1963); 2 SEC Indoor (1975, 1976)

Awards
- 6× Georgia Coach of the Year (1957–1962); Florida Sports Hall of Fame (1980); Georgia Sports Hall of Fame (1984); USTFCCCA Hall of Fame (1998); USA Track & Field Hall of Fame (2008); University of Florida Athletic Hall of Fame

James Jerome Carnes (November 29, 1934 – March 5, 2011) was an American track and field athlete, coach and administrator. A successful coach at the high school, college and international levels, Carnes compiled a 161–11 career dual meet record, highlighted by four college conference championships and six state high school championships. He was the head coach of the U.S. Olympic track & field team and the Florida Gators track and field team, the founder of the Florida Track Club, and a member of the U.S. Track & Field Hall of Fame.

== Early years ==
Jimmy Carnes was born in Eatonton, Georgia. He attended Mercer University in Macon, Georgia from 1952 to 1956, where he played for the Mercer Bears basketball team and was a javelin thrower and high jumper for the Bears track and field team. Carnes dated his future wife, Nanette, a Mercer education major whom he knew from Eatonton, while they were undergraduates.

== Coaching career ==
=== High school ===
Carnes graduated from Mercer in 1956, and accepted his first job as a physical education teacher and assistant coach for the football, basketball and track teams at Druid Hills High School in DeKalb County, Georgia. In his second year at Druid Hills, he was named head coach of the track team. From 1957 to 1962, Carnes' Druid Hills track teams were a perfect 52–0 in dual meets and captured six Georgia high school state championships, and he was recognized as the Georgia coach of the year six times.

=== College ===
In 1962, Carnes became the head cross country and track and field coach at Furman University in Greenville, South Carolina. His Furman track and field teams were 16–3 in dual meets, and won both the Southern Conference indoor and outdoor track and field championships in his two seasons there. After the 1964 track season, Carnes accepted the head coaching position at the University of Florida in Gainesville, Florida. From 1965 to 1976, Carnes' Florida Gators track and field teams finished in the top three in the Southeastern Conference (SEC) fifteen times, won two SEC indoor track championships, and compiled a 93–3 overall record in dual meets. Among his many Gators track and field athletes were sixty-five SEC individual champions, four NCAA individual champions and twenty-four All-Americans.

In 1965, Carnes founded the Florida Track Club in Gainesville, an amateur track and field organization that helped to train high school athletes, college-level transfer students, future Olympians and other post-graduate competitors. Over the following decade, the Florida Track club became a magnet for serious track and field athletes training for international competitions, including Jack Bacheler, Jeff Galloway, Marty Liquori and Frank Shorter. Carnes recruited fifty-five graduate student-athletes for the Florida Track Club by offering several of them assistant coaching positions and helping many of them obtain graduate assistantships within the university to help them continue their graduate studies.

=== Olympics ===
Carnes served as the assistant coach of the U.S. men's track and field team for the 1976 Summer Olympics in Montreal. He was named the head coach of the U.S. men's track and field team that was forced to boycott the 1980 Summer Olympics in Moscow as a result of the Soviet Union's 1979 invasion of Afghanistan.

== Business ventures ==
In 1973, Carnes and Liquori co-founded Athletic Attic, one of the nation's first sports equipment chain stores, with an emphasis on running shoes for training and competition. At the peak of the running craze, Athletic Attic had over 165 stores in the United States, Canada, Japan and New Zealand with over $40 million in annual revenue. Carnes resigned as the Gators track coach in September 1976 to focus on his Athletic Attic business interests and his Olympic coaching.

== Sports administration ==
As chairman of the Governor's Council on Sports and Physical Fitness, Carnes was the founder of the Sunshine State Games, Florida's annual Olympic-style multi-sport festival. The first games were held in 1980, and have been held every year since then.

Carnes became the chairman of the track division of the Amateur Athletic Union (AAU) in 1977, and helped heal a decades-long institutional rift between the AAU and the NCAA. From 1980 to 1984, he served as the first president of The Athletics Congress/USA (now known as USA Track & Field), after it was spun off from the AAU. He was also involved in the formation of TACTRUST, the first step toward open track competition, and worked to guide the sport from amateur to open competition rules.

Carnes served a total of twenty-one years as a member of the board of directors of the International Special Olympics.

== Honors ==
Carnes was inducted as a member of the Florida Sports Hall of Fame in 1980, the Georgia Sports Hall of Fame in 1984, the U.S. Track & Field and Cross Country Coaches Association Hall of Fame in 1998, and the USA Track & Field Hall of Fame in 2008. He was also inducted into the University of Florida Athletic Hall of Fame as an "honorary letter winner" in 1983. The Gainesville Sports Commission has sponsored an annual championship called the Jimmy Carnes Indoor Track and Field Meet since 2008.

== Personal life ==
Carnes was married to Nanette Carnes, and they were the parents of three sons and a daughter. He died in Gainesville in 2011, after a three-and-a-half-year battle with cancer; he was 76 years old. Carnes was survived by his wife and their children.

== See also ==
- Florida Gators
- History of the University of Florida
- List of alumni of Mercer University
- List of University of Florida Olympians
- List of University of Florida Athletic Hall of Fame members
- University Athletic Association

== Bibliography ==
- Caraccioli, Jerry, & Tom Caraccioli, Boycott: Stolen Dreams of the 1980 Moscow Olympic Games, New Chapter Press, Washington, D.C. (2009). ISBN 978-0-942257-54-0.
- Carnes, Jimmy, Teaching High School and College Track and Field Athletics, Paladin House, Geneva, Illinois (1976). ISBN 978-0-88252-045-2.
