= Florida Gators track and field =

Track and field program of the University of Florida

- University: University of Florida
- Head coach: Mike Holloway (22nd season)
- Conference: SEC
- Location: Gainesville, Florida, US
- Indoor track: Stephen C. O'Connell Center
- Outdoor track: Percy Beard Track
- Nickname: Florida Gators
- Colors: Orange and blue

NCAA Indoor National Championships
- Men's: 2010, 2011, 2012, 2018, 2019; Women's: 1992, 2022

NCAA Outdoor National Championships
- Men's: 2012, 2013, 2016, 2017, 2022, 2023, 2024; Women's: 2022

Conference Indoor Championships
- Men's: 1975, 1976, 1987, 1988, 2004, 2011, 2015, 2019; Women's: 1990, 1992, 1997, 2002, 2004, 2010, 2012, 2014, 2026

Conference Outdoor Championships
- Men's: 1953, 1956, 1987, 2010, 2015, 2018; Women's: 1992, 1997, 1998, 2003, 2009, 2018, 2022, 2026

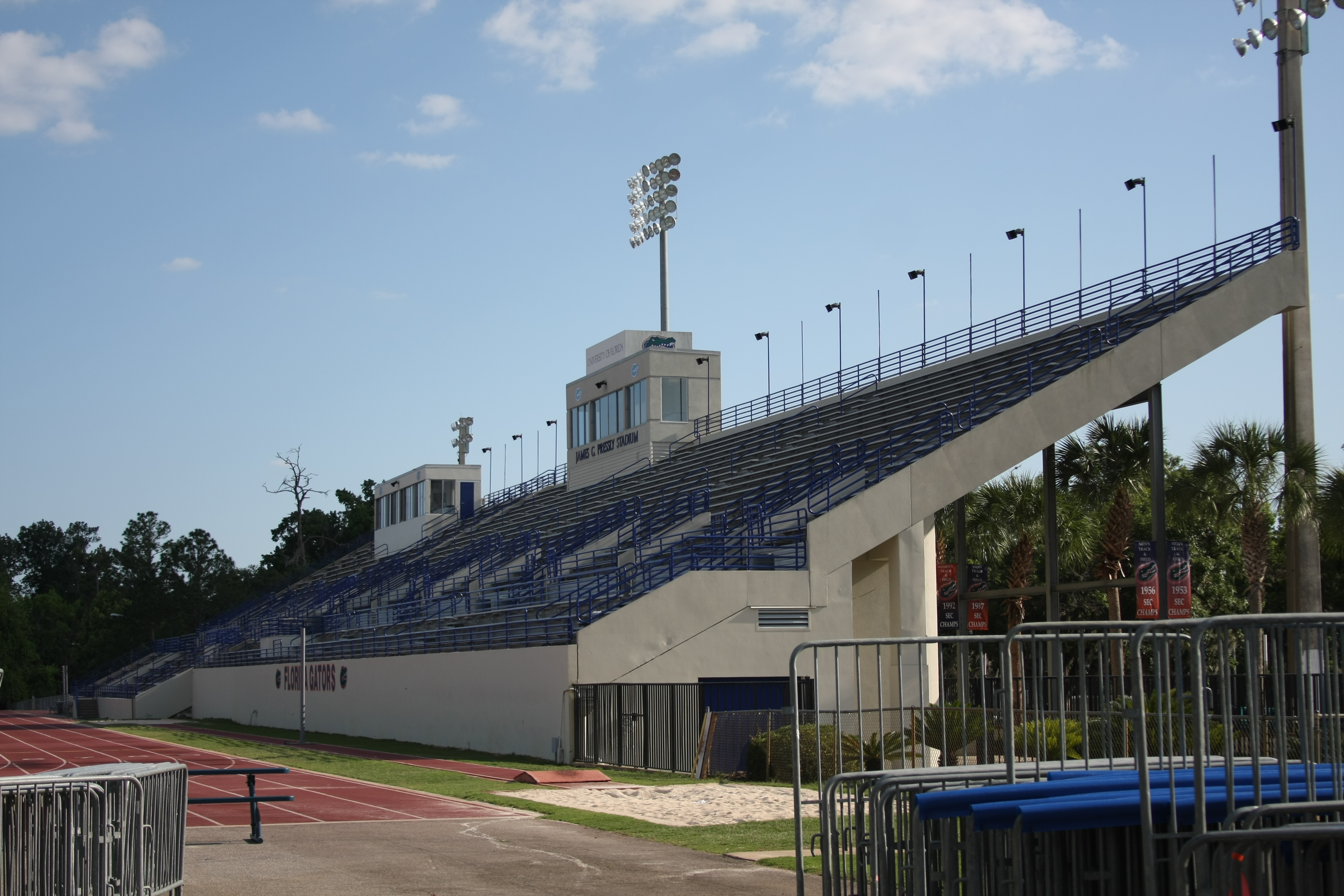
Percy Beard Track at Pressly Stadium is the home of the Florida Gators track and field teams.

The Florida Gators track and field program represents the University of Florida in the sport of track and field. The program includes separate men's and women's teams, both of which compete in Division I of the National Collegiate Athletic Association (NCAA) and the Southeastern Conference (SEC). The Gators host their home indoor meets in the Stephen C. O'Connell Center and their home outdoor meets at Percy Beard Track, both located on the university's Gainesville, Florida campus. The Gators track teams are currently led by head coach Mike Holloway.

== History ==
The Florida Gators men's track and field team was organized in 1923; the Gators women's team was formed in 1973. The University of Florida joined the Southeastern Conference (SEC) in December 1932, and the Gators track team began to compete in the SEC in the spring of 1933.

Historically, the Gators have been a force in the SEC, and have won a total of 21 conference team championships. The Gators men have won four SEC outdoor championships (1953, 1956, 1987, 2010), and six indoor championships (1975, 1976, 1987, 2010). The Gators women have won five SEC outdoor championships (1992, 1997, 1998, 2003, 2009), and six indoor championships (1990, 1992, 1997, 2002, 2004, 2012). Head coach Percy Beard, a former elite hurdler and silver medalist at the 1932 Summer Olympics, led the Gators to their first national prominence in the 1940s, 1950s and early 1960s, including their first two SEC outdoor championships. Beard's successor, Jimmy Carnes, coached the Gators from the early 1960s until 1976, and accounted for the Gators' first two SEC indoor team championships. Carnes was chosen to be the head coach of the U.S. Olympic track and field team in 1980, and later served as the head of the U.S. Track & Field Association.

In 2009, the women's team won the SEC outdoor championship.

In 2010, the men's teams won both the NCAA Men's Indoor Track and Field Championship and the SEC men's outdoor championship. The 2010 women's team placed second in the SEC outdoor meet.

The Gators men's team won their second consecutive NCAA Men's Indoor Track and Field Championship in 2011, following their sixth SEC indoor championship. At the 2011 SEC outdoor track tournament, the Gators men and women's teams both placed second of twelve SEC teams in the 2011 conference track meet held in Athens, Georgia. In the remarkably close final standings at the 2011 NCAA outdoor track and field championships in Des Moines, Iowa, the Texas A&M Aggies men finished first with fifty-five points, the Florida State Seminoles men were second with fifty-four points, and the Gators men were third with fifty-three points.

The Gators men's team won their third straight NCAA Men's Indoor Track and Field Championship in March 2012, and following a string of four NCAA outdoor second-place finishes since 2004, won their first NCAA Men's Outdoor Track and Field Championship in June 2012. They proceeded to win their second, third, and fourth outdoor championships in 2013, 2016, and 2017.

In 2015, Marquis Dendy was named winner of The Bowerman, the first in Gator history to win the award.

== Coaching staff ==
The Gators' current head coach for both the men's and women's track and field teams is Mike Holloway. Following the Gators' 2010 NCAA indoor track and field championship, Holloway was named the 2010 indoor track and field coach of the year.

The associate head coach for cross country and assistant track and field coach is Will Palmer, who joined the program in 2023 after coaching at Alabama, Georgetown, Western Kentucky, and Iowa State. The throws coach is Eric Werskey, a former Iowa assistant and three-time All-American at Auburn, who joined Florida in 2021. The assistant coach for horizontal jumps and pole vault is Nic Petersen. The assistant coach for high jump, sprints, recruiting is Mellanee Welty.

== Olympic track and field medalists ==
The following Florida Gators athletes have earned medals in one or more track and field events at the Summer Olympics:

- Will Claye, American silver and bronze medalist at 2012 London Olympics, and silver medalist at 2016 Rio de Janeiro Olympics
- Kerron Clement, American gold and silver medalist at 2008 Beijing, and gold medalist at 2016 Rio de Janeiro Olympics
- Jeff Demps, American silver medalist at 2012 London Olympics
- Grant Holloway, American silver medalist at 2020 Tokyo Olympics
- Michelle Freeman, Jamaican bronze medalist at 1996 Atlanta Olympics
- Tony McQuay, American silver medalist at 2012 London Olympics, and gold medalist at 2016 Rio de Janeiro Olympics
- Dennis Mitchell, American gold medalist and bronze medalist at 1992 Barcelona Olympics, silver medalist at 1996 Atlanta Olympics
- Christian Taylor, American gold medalist at 2012 London Olympics, and gold medalist at 2016 Rio de Janeiro Olympics
- Bernard Williams, American gold medalist at 2000 Sydney Olympics, and silver medalist at 2004 Athens Olympics
- Novlene Williams, Jamaican bronze medalist at 2004 Athens Olympics, silver medalist at the 2008 Beijing Olympics, silver medalist at the 2012 London Olympics, and silver medalist at the 2016 Rio de Janeiro Olympics

== See also ==
- Florida Gators
- Florida Gators cross country
- History of the University of Florida
- List of University of Florida Athletic Hall of Fame members
- List of University of Florida Olympians
- University Athletic Association
