= Benjamin S. Griffin =

American General

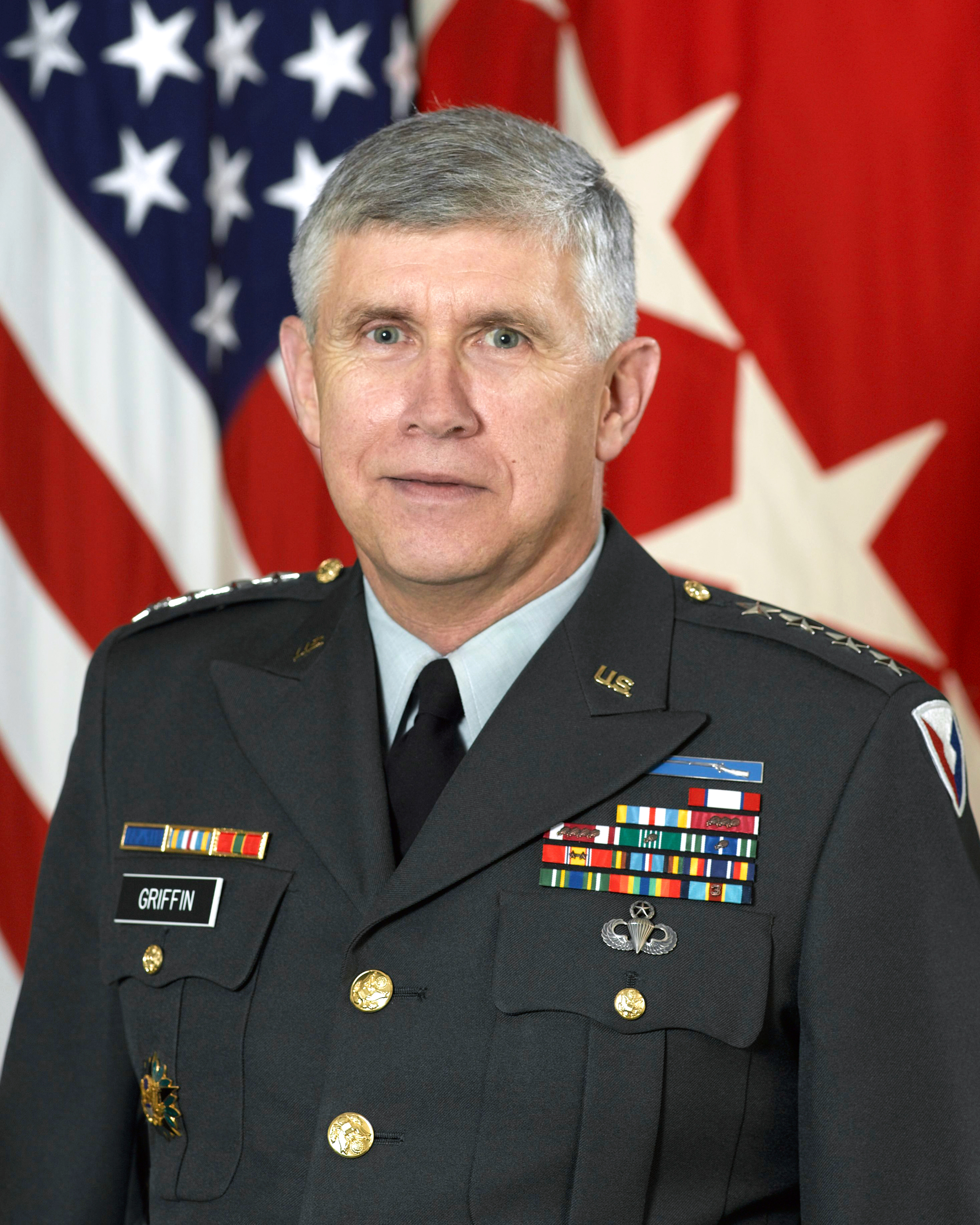
- General Benjamin S. Griffin
- Born: 11 August 1946 (age 80); Emporia, Virginia, U.S.
- Military career
- Allegiance: United States of America
- Branch: United States Army
- Service years: 1970–2008
- Rank: General
- Commands: U.S. Army Materiel Command; 4th Infantry Division; Joint Task Force 6
- Awards: Army Distinguished Service Medal; Legion of Merit (4); Master Parachutist Badge; Expert Infantryman Badge

Benjamin Saunders Griffin (born 11 August 1946), was a four-star general in the United States Army. He served as the Commanding General, United States Army Materiel Command from 5 November 2004 to 13 November 2008. Prior to this assignment, he served as the Department of the Army Deputy Chief of Staff, G-8. He retired from the Army after over 38 years of service.

== Early life and education ==
Griffin is a 1964 graduate of Greensville County High School in his hometown of Emporia, Virginia. He attended Louisburg College in North Carolina before enrolling at Old Dominion University and receiving a bachelor's degree in Business Management in 1969. Griffin later earned a master's degree in Business Administration from Mercer University in 1981.

His military education includes the Infantry Officer Advanced Course, Command and General Staff College, and the Industrial College of the Armed Forces at the National Defense University.

== Career ==
Griffin began his career when he was commissioned as an Infantry officer in July 1970 following graduation from Officer Candidate School, Fort Benning, Georgia. He served two tours at Fort Bragg, North Carolina in the 82nd Airborne Division: in the 1st Battalion, 508th Infantry Regiment as a rifle platoon leader and company executive officer, and in the 3rd Battalion (Airborne), 325th Infantry Regiment as a commander of Company C and a S-3 Air (Operations) officer. General Griffin also worked as a G3 operations officer, Headquarters, 82nd Airborne Division.

Griffin's overseas assignments included a tour in South Korea as a Company Commander and Brigade S-2 in the 2nd Infantry Division. He served two tours in Germany in the 8th Infantry Division as Secretary of the General Staff and Mechanized Infantry Battalion Executive Officer in the 2nd Battalion (Mechanized), 87th Infantry. He was also Commander of the 3rd Battalion, 8th Infantry Regiment.

His later assignments included: Special Assistant to the Chief of Staff of the Army in Washington, D.C., and Commander of the 2nd Brigade, 6th Infantry Division (Light) in Alaska. In August 1994, he served as Executive Officer to the Commanding General, United States Army Forces Command, Fort McPherson, Georgia.

Following his assignment in Georgia, General Griffin took command of Joint Task Force 6, Fort Bliss, Texas. He then served as the Assistant Division Commander (Support), 1st Cavalry Division in Fort Hood, Texas.

In July 1997, he became the Director of Force Programs, Office of the Deputy Chief of Staff for Operations and Plans in Washington, D.C. General Griffin returned to Fort Hood from June 1999 to October 2001 to command the 4th Infantry Division.

== Personal life ==
As of 2011, General Griffin was an Executive Fellow with the Institute for Defense and Business and a fellow of the Institute for Strategic and Innovative Technologies.

== Awards and decorations ==
General Griffin's awards and decorations include:

Distinguished Service Medal
Defense Superior Service Medal
Legion of Merit (with three oak leaf clusters)
Meritorious Service Medal (with four oak leaf clusters)
Army Commendation Medal (with one oak leaf cluster)
Army Achievement Medal (with one oak leaf cluster)
Joint Meritorious Unit Award

Parachutist Badge
Expert Infantryman Badge
Army General Staff Badge
