= 2019 Fed Cup Asia/Oceania Zone =

Subsection of tennis competition

The Asia/Oceania Zone is one of three zones of regional competition in the 2019 Fed Cup.

== Group I ==
- Venue: Daulet National Tennis Centre, Astana, Kazakhstan (indoor hard)
- Date: 6–9 February

The seven teams were divided into one pool of 3 teams (Pool A) and one pool of 4 teams (Pool B). The two pool winners took part in a play-off to determine the nation advancing to the World Group II play-offs. The teams that finished third in each pool took part in a play-off to determine which nation will be relegated to Asia/Oceania Zone Group II in 2020. The nation finishing fourth in Pool B was automatically relegated.

=== Seeding ===
Pot	Nation	Rank^{1}	Seed
1	Kazakhstan	22	1
1	China	24	2
2	South Korea	30	3
2	India	32	4
3	Thailand	34	5
3	Indonesia	41	6
3	Pacific Oceania	45	7

- ^{1}Fed Cup Rankings as of 12 November 2018

=== Pools ===
	Pool A	KAZ	IND	THA
1	Kazakhstan (2–0)		3–0	3–0
2	India (1–1)	0–3		2–1
3	Thailand (0–2)	0–3	1–2	

	Pool B	CHN	KOR	INA	POC
1	China (3–0)		3–0	3–0	3–0
2	South Korea (2–1)	0–3		3–0	3–0
3	Indonesia (1–2)	0–3	0–3		3–0
4	Pacific Oceania (0–3)	0–3	0–3	0–3	

=== Play-offs ===
Placing	A Team	Score	B Team
Promotional	China	1–2	Kazakhstan
3rd–4th	India	1–2	South Korea
Relegation	Indonesia	2–1	Thailand
Relegation	—N/a		Pacific Oceania

=== Final placements ===
Placing	Teams
Promoted/First	Kazakhstan
Second	China
Third	South Korea
Fourth	India
Fifth	Indonesia
Relegated/Sixth	Thailand
Relegated/Seventh	Pacific Oceania

- Kazakhstan was promoted to the 2019 Fed Cup World Group II Play-offs.
- Thailand and Pacific Oceania were relegated to Asia/Oceania Zone Group II in 2020.

== Group II ==
- Venue 1: Pamir Stadium, Dushanbe, Tajikistan (hard)
- Dates: 12–15 June
- Venue 2: National Tennis Centre, Kuala Lumpur, Malaysia (hard)
- Dates: 19–23 June

13 nations will compete across two different venues. In Dushanbe, six teams will compete across two pools of 3 teams (Pools A & B). The winners of each pool will play-off to determine which nation will advance to Asia/Oceania Zone Group I. In Kuala Lumpur, seven teams will compete across two pools of 3 and 4 teams (Pools A & B). The winners of each pool will play-off to determine which nation will advance to Asia/Oceania Zone Group I. One team will be promoted from each venue.

=== Seeding ===
Pot	Nation	Rank^{1}	Seed
1	Uzbekistan	47	1
1	Chinese Taipei	48	2
1	Hong Kong	50	3
1	Singapore	63	4
2	Malaysia	67	5
2	New Zealand	72	6
2	Sri Lanka	73	7
2	Philippines	75	8
3	Pakistan	80	9
3	Tajikistan	87	10
3	Iran	91	11
3	Turkmenistan	98	12
3	Bangladesh	NR	13

- ^{1}Fed Cup Rankings as of 22 April 2019

=== Pools ===
	Pool A (Dushanbe)	TPE	PHI	TJK
1	Chinese Taipei (2–0)		3–0	3–0
2	Philippines (1–1)	0–3		3–0
3	Tajikistan (0–2)	0–3	0–3	

	Pool B (Dushanbe)	SGP	SRI	IRI
1	Singapore (2–0)		2–1	3–0
2	Sri Lanka (1–1)	1–2		2–1
3	Iran (0–2)	0–3	1–2	

	Pool A (Kuala Lumpur)	UZB	MAS	TKM
1	Uzbekistan (2–0)		3–0	3–0
2	Malaysia (1–1)	0–3		3–0
3	Turkmenistan (0–2)	0–3	0–3	

	Pool B (Kuala Lumpur)	HKG	NZL	PAK	BAN
1	Hong Kong (3–0)		2–1	3–0	3–0
2	New Zealand (2–1)	1–2		3–0	3–0
3	Pakistan (1–2)	0–3	0–3		3–0
4	Bangladesh (0–3)	0–3	0–3	0–3	

=== Play-offs ===
Placing (Dushanbe)	A Team	Score	B Team
Promotional	Chinese Taipei	2–0	Singapore
3rd–4th	Philippines	2–0	Sri Lanka
5th–6th	Tajikistan	1–2	Iran

Placing (Kuala Lumpur)	A Team	Score	B Team
Promotional	Uzbekistan	2–1	Hong Kong
3rd–4th	Malaysia	1–2	New Zealand
5th–6th	Turkmenistan	2–1	Pakistan
7th	—N/a		Bangladesh

=== Final placements ===
Placing	Teams	
Promoted/First	Chinese Taipei	Uzbekistan
Second	Singapore	Hong Kong
Third	Philippines	New Zealand
Fourth	Sri Lanka	Malaysia
Fifth	Iran	Turkmenistan
Sixth	Tajikistan	Pakistan
Seventh	Bangladesh	

- Chinese Taipei and Uzbekistan were promoted to Asia/Oceania Zone Group I in 2020.
