= Paige Hourigan =

New Zealand tennis player (born 1997)

- Full name: Paige Mary Hourigan
- Country (sports): New Zealand
- Born: 3 February 1997 (age 29) Turakina, New Zealand
- Prize money: $66,511

Singles
- Career record: 106–69
- Career titles: 4 ITF
- Highest ranking: No. 393 (24 May 2021)

Doubles
- Career record: 122–57
- Career titles: 16 ITF
- Highest ranking: No. 134 (11 November 2019)

Team competitions
- Fed Cup: 13–8 (singles 7–5, doubles 6–3)
- Last updated on: 17 June 2026.

Paige Mary Hourigan (born 3 February 1997) is an inactive tennis player from New Zealand. She has won four singles and 16 doubles titles on the ITF Circuit. She reached her best rankings in both singles and doubles, after winning ITF titles in Singapore and Surprise, Arizona early in 2019, and those rankings continued to climb as her run of success extended through Mexico and Asia.

== Career ==
=== Junior years ===
Hourigan won five singles and five doubles titles as a junior, the best of which was the doubles at the Grade-2 Biesterbos Open in the Netherlands, partnering Lizette Cabrera. She twice competed in the Australian Open junior singles, her better result being a loss in the first round proper to Beatriz Haddad Maia in 2013. Her best junior ranking was 175, in October 2012.

=== Tour debut ===
She made her WTA Tour debut at the 2013 Auckland Open. Her first main-draw win was in an ITF doubles match in Glen Iris, Australia, in April 2014, and her first ITF final resulted in a doubles win in Antalya, Turkey, in June 2016. She first represented New Zealand in the Fed Cup in Dushanbe, Tajikistan, in 2017, winning two of her three singles matches.

=== 2018 ===
Hourigan won her first singles title as a qualifier at Corroios (a suburb of Lisbon), Portugal, in July, just a few hours after being beaten in a qualifying match for her next tournament in neighbouring Setubal. Returning to North America, she then went all the way to the semifinals as a qualifier in an ITF tournament in Fort Worth, Texas. In December, she was runner-up to Valentina Ivanov in the singles at the New Zealand Tennis Championships, and won the doubles title with Erin Routliffe.

=== 2019 ===
Given a wildcard into the singles qualifying draw at the Auckland Open, Hourigan was again beaten by Valentina Ivanov, this time in the first round. She did much better in the doubles where, with partner Taylor Townsend, she got all the way to her first WTA Tour final, having defeated second seeds Kirsten Flipkens and Johanna Larsson in the semifinal. Against the scratch pair of Eugenie Bouchard and Sofia Kenin, Hourigan and Townsend raced through the first set to lead 6–1, but lost the second set by the same score. The match tie-break was a scrappy affair, with Bouchard and Kenin eventually winning 10–7 to take the title.

Hourigan made no mistakes in her run to the second ITF doubles title in Singapore three weeks later, this time with Indonesia's Aldila Sutjiadi as her partner. Beating the top seeds in their semifinal, they comfortably defeated the Hong Kong pair of Eudice Chong and Zhang Ling in the final, winning nine games in a row from 1–2 down in the first set on the way to a final score of 6–2, 6–3. Hourigan's third ITF doubles title came just three weeks later, in Surprise, Arizona, with star American youngster Coco Gauff on her side of the net. They started by beating the third seeds, Jovana Jakšić and Giuliana Olmos, and defeated the second seeds, Jacqueline Cako and Ingrid Neel, in an amazing semi-final, coming back from two set points down at 2–5, 30–40 to win five games in a row and take the first set. The second set was more straightforward, as they went on to win 7–5, 6–3. Less than an hour later they were back on court for the final, where they won the first set against Usue Maitane Arconada and Emina Bektas, but lost the second. The match tie-break saw the all-American pair work their way to a 9–5 lead, holding four match points. Hourigan and Gauff managed to save all four points to change ends again at 9-9, but then faced another match point, which they saved as well. They dropped their own first point again for match point number six, but recovered to level up at 11–11. They then lost a match point of their own, before finally prevailing 14–12 after an epic 18 minute struggle.

On the Mexican swing of the ITF Circuit in March, she won the doubles title in Irapuato, and followed that with a runner-up finish in doubles and a win in the singles at the second tournament in Cancun, before taking the doubles title at the same venue a week later, after retiring during her singles semifinal earlier that day. That was followed by another title in Asia, as she reunited with Aldila Sutjiadi to make it two titles from two tournaments together by winning in Hong Kong.

Staying together for the next few tournaments, Hourigan and Sutjiadi lost to Rutuja Bhosale and Abigail Tere-Apisah in the semifinals of the first tournament in Singapore, beaten 14–12 in a match tie-break, after holding two match points at 9–7. They made amends by winning the corresponding tournament the following week, beating Emily Appleton and Catherine Harrison in the final after Sutjiadi had thrashed Hourigan in their singles semifinal. Their last tournament together was the following week in Hong Kong, where they were beaten in the semifinals by Tere-Apisah and Junri Namigata, in a match in which several crucial line calls were disputed by one team or the other.

The next stop for Hourigan was the Fed Cup in Malaysia, where she had two double-bagel wins in singles before losing in three sets to Eudice Chong from Hong Kong. She played just one doubles match, teaming up with Erin Routliffe to beat the pair from Bangladesh. Moving on to Europe, Hourigan was injured in her first match in Spain before travelling to Portugal to try to defend her singles crown in Corroios. Well-beaten in the quarterfinals by Pemra Özgen, she and Alison Bai won the doubles title, beating Francisca Jorge and Olga Parres Azcoitia in a tight match tie-break in the final, winning 14–12 on their third match point, having saved two earlier in the tie-break. It was Hourigan's third doubles match of the season, and the second final, to feature the same score in the decider.

A family bereavement cut short Hourigan's European tour, and she didn't play again for nearly two months, resuming at Redding, California, in September. She and Catherine Harrison reached the doubles final, but they were well-beaten by Emina Bektas and Tara Moore. Four tournaments in Australia followed, the best resulting in another doubles final, where she and Bai lost to Destanee Aiava and Naiktha Bains in Brisbane. Two tournaments in Texas ended Hourigan's year, she and Katherine Sebov reaching the doubles semifinals in Dallas, but they had to default through injury.

=== 2020 ===
Hourigan began the new season in Auckland, where she received a wildcard into both singles and doubles, the latter with Sara Errani. She suffered a heavy defeat to Caroline Wozniacki in the first round of singles, and also lost in the first round of doubles. The next stop was an ITF tournament in Burnie, Tasmania, where she again lost in the first round of singles, this time after having to qualify, but made the semifinals of the doubles with Destanee Aiava.

Back in New Zealand, Hourigan won all three singles matches she played in the Fed Cup tournament in Wellington, ensuring New Zealand's place in the Asia/Oceania Zone Group I for 2021. Back in Australia, Hourigan lost in the first round of singles in both tournaments in Perth, Australia. She and Abigail Tere-Apisah lost in the quarterfinals of the first week's doubles event, but got through to the final in the second week, losing to Kanako Morisaki and Erika Sema.

From Perth, Hourigan flew to South Africa for two tournaments in Potchefstroom. In the first tournament she lost again in the first round of singles, but she and Berfu Cengiz were beaten in the doubles final by Samantha Murray Sharan and Fanny Stollár. Hourigan had reached the singles quarterfinal and doubles semifinal in the second week when the ITF Circuit events were suspended because of COVID-19. The only matches allowed to continue were those actually being played when the order to abandon was given.

Hourigan played just one tournament after the resumption of play in August, an ITF event in Sharm El Sheikh where she lost her doubles quarterfinal and had to withdraw from her singles quarterfinal when down 0–2 in the deciding set.

=== 2021 ===
Warming up for the new season with a series of exhibition matches in Auckland, Hourigan flew to Egypt in late March to resume her ITF career in Sharm El Sheikh. She had instant success, winning the singles title at the first tournament she entered, and keeping her unbeaten record in singles finals intact. Two weeks later, she won a doubles title at Monastir in Tunisia, and followed that with a singles title at the same venue.

== WTA Tour finals ==
=== Doubles: 1 (runner-up) ===
Legend Premier (0–0) International (0–1)	Finals by surface Hard (0–1) Clay (0–0)

Result	Date	Tournament	Tier	Surface	Partner	Opponents	Score
Loss	Jan 2019	Auckland Open, New Zealand	International	Hard	(United States) Taylor Townsend	(Canada) Eugenie Bouchard (United States) Sofia Kenin	6–1, 1–6, [7–10]

== ITF Circuit finals ==
=== Singles: 4 (4 titles) ===
Legend W15 tournaments (4–0)	Finals by surface Hard (4–0)

Result	W–L	Date	Tournament	Tier	Surface	Opponent	Score
Win	1–0	Jul 2018	ITF Corroios, Portugal	W15	Hard	(Zimbabwe) Valeria Bhunu	6–4, 6–3
Win	2–0	Mar 2019	ITF Cancún, Mexico	W15	Hard	(Colombia) Camila Osorio	6–4, 6–3
Win	3–0	Apr 2021	ITF Sharm El Sheikh, Egypt	W15	Hard	(Czech Republic) Anna Sisková	3–6, 6–1, 6–2
Win	4–0	Apr 2021	ITF Monastir, Tunisia	W15	Hard	(Czech Republic) Monika Kilnarová	6–3, 6–2

=== Doubles: 23 (16 titles, 7 runner-ups) ===
Legend W75 tournaments (2–0) W50 tournaments (2–0) W25/35 tournaments (9–6) W15/10 tournaments (3–1)	Finals by surface Hard (15–7) Carpet (1–0)

Result	W–L	Date	Tournament	Tier	Surface	Partner	Opponents	Score
Win	1–0	Jun 2016	ITF Antalya, Turkey	W10	Hard	(Netherlands) Arianne Hartono	(Romania) Raluca Șerban (Italy) Miriana Tona	6–3, ret.
Win	2–0	Jan 2019	ITF Singapore	W25	Hard	(Indonesia) Aldila Sutjiadi	(Hong Kong) Eudice Chong (Hong Kong) Zhang Ling	6–2, 6–3
Win	3–0	Feb 2019	ITF Surprise, United States	W25	Hard	(United States) Coco Gauff	(United States) Usue Maitane Arconada (United States) Emina Bektas	6–3, 4–6, [14–12]
Win	4–0	Mar 2019	ITF Irapuato, Mexico	W25	Hard	(Australia) Astra Sharma	(Paraguay) Verónica Cepede Royg (Czech Republic) Renata Voráčová	6–1, 4–6, [12–10]
Loss	4–1	Mar 2019	ITF Cancún, Mexico	W15	Hard	(United States) Rasheeda McAdoo	(France) Lou Brouleau (Switzerland) Tess Sugnaux	4–6, 3–6
Win	5–1	Mar 2019	ITF Cancún, Mexico	W15	Hard	(Montenegro) Vladica Babić	(Czech Republic) Karolína Beránková (Paraguay) Lara Escauriza	6–4, 6–3
Win	6–1	Apr 2019	ITF Hong Kong	W25	Hard (i) *	(Indonesia) Aldila Sutjiadi	(Australia) Maddison Inglis (Australia) Kaylah McPhee	6–3, 6–1
Win	7–1	May 2019	ITF Singapore	W25	Hard	(Indonesia) Aldila Sutjiadi	(United Kingdom) Emily Appleton (United States) Catherine Harrison	6–1, 7–6^{(5)}
Win	8–1	Jul 2019	ITF Corroios, Portugal	W25	Hard	(Australia) Alison Bai	(Portugal) Francisca Jorge (Spain) Olga Parres Azcoitia	3–6, 6–2, [14–12]
Loss	8–2	Sep 2019	ITF Redding, United States	W25	Hard	(United States) Catherine Harrison	(United States) Emina Bektas (United Kingdom) Tara Moore	3–6, 1–6
Loss	8–3	Oct 2019	ITF Brisbane, Australia	W25	Hard	(Australia) Alison Bai	(Australia) Destanee Aiava (United Kingdom) Naiktha Bains	3–6, 3–6
Loss	8–4	Feb 2020	ITF Perth, Australia	W25	Hard	(Papua New Guinea) Abigail Tere-Apisah	(Japan) Kanako Morisaki (Japan) Erika Sema	1–6, 6–4, [7–10]
Loss	8–5	Mar 2020	ITF Potchefstroom, South Africa	W25	Hard	(Turkey) Berfu Cengiz	(United Kingdom) Samantha Murray Sharan (Hungary) Fanny Stollár	1–6, 1–6
Win	9–5	Apr 2021	ITF Monastir, Tunisia	W15	Hard	(Australia) Alexandra Osborne	(Belgium) Magali Kempen (Belgium) Chelsea Vanhoutte	4–1 ret.
Win	10–5	May 2021	ITF Salinas, Ecuador	W25	Hard	(United Kingdom) Jodie Burrage	(Portugal) Francisca Jorge (Sweden) Jacqueline Cabaj Awad	6–2, 2–6, [10–8]
Loss	10–6	Jun 2021	ITF Sumter, United States	W25	Hard	(Indonesia) Aldila Sutjiadi	(United States) Emina Bektas (United States) Catherine Harrison	5–7, 4–6
Loss	10–7	Apr 2022	ITF Monastir, Tunisia	W25	Hard	Valeria Savinykh	(Uzbekistan) Nigina Abduraimova (Japan) Hiroko Kuwata	1–6, 6–3, [10–12]
Win	11–7	Dec 2022	ITF Tauranga, New Zealand	W25	Hard	(New Zealand) Erin Routliffe	(India) Ashmitha Easwaramurthi (Japan) Yuka Hosoki	6–1, 6–0
Win	12–7	Jan 2024	Burnie International, Australia	W75	Hard	(New Zealand) Erin Routliffe	(Japan) Kyoka Okamura (Japan) Ayano Shimizu	7–6^{(5)}, 6–4
Win	13–7	Apr 2024	ITF Wuning, China	W50	Hard	(India) Rutuja Bhosale	(Chinese Taipei) Cho I-hsuan (Chinese Taipei) Cho Yi-tsen	5–7, 7–6(^{(5)}, [12–10]
Win	14–7	May 2024	Fukuoka International, Japan	W75	Carpet	(India) Rutuja Bhosale	(Japan) Haruna Arakawa (Japan) Aoi Ito	3–6, 6–3, [10–6]
Win	15–7	Jun 2024	ITF Changwon, Korea	W35	Hard	(Japan) Erika Sema	(China) Li Zongyu (China) Shi Han	6–4, 4–6, [10–4]
Win	16–7	Apr 2025	ITF Lopota, Georgia	W50	Hard	(India) Rutuja Bhosale	(India) Shrivalli Bhamidipaty; Alexandra Shubladze	6–3, 6–2

- This tournament is an outdoor event, but rain caused the doubles final to be postponed from 13 April and then transferred to an indoor court.

== Fed Cup participation ==
=== Singles (7–5) ===
Edition	Stage	Date	Location	Against	Surface	Opponent	W/L	Score
2017 Fed Cup; Asia/Oceania Zone Group II	R/R	18 July 2017	Dushanbe, Tajikistan	Turkmenistan	Hard	(Turkmenistan) Jahan Bayramova	W	6–0, 6–0
2017 Fed Cup; Asia/Oceania Zone Group II	R/R	19 July 2017	Dushanbe, Tajikistan	Uzbekistan	Hard	(Uzbekistan) Nigina Abduraimova	L	5–7, 6–4, 6–7^{(3)}
2017 Fed Cup; Asia/Oceania Zone Group II	P/O	21 July 2017	Dushanbe, Tajikistan	Sri Lanka	Hard	(Sri Lanka) Roshenka Fernando	W	6–0, 6–1
2019 Fed Cup; Asia/Oceania Zone Group II	R/R	19 June 2019	Kuala Lumpur, Malaysia	Bangladesh	Hard	(Bangladesh) Eshita Afrose	W	6–0, 6–0
2019 Fed Cup; Asia/Oceania Zone Group II	R/R	20 June 2019	Kuala Lumpur, Malaysia	Pakistan	Hard	(Pakistan) Sarah Mahboob Khan	W	6–0, 6–0
2019 Fed Cup; Asia/Oceania Zone Group II	R/R	21 June 2019	Kuala Lumpur, Malaysia	Hong Kong	Hard	(Hong Kong) Eudice Chong	L	6–4, 4–6, 1–6
2020 Fed Cup; Asia/Oceania Zone Group II	R/R	6 February 2020	Wellington, New Zealand	Pakistan	Hard	(Pakistan) Sarah Mahboob Khan	W	6–2, 6–0
2020 Fed Cup; Asia/Oceania Zone Group II	R/R	7 February 2020	Wellington, New Zealand	Singapore	Hard	(Singapore) Hx Izabella Tan	W	6–1, 6–1
2020 Fed Cup; Asia/Oceania Zone Group II	P/O	8 February 2020	Wellington, New Zealand	Philippines	Hard	(Philippines) Marian Capadocia	W	6–2, 6–3
2022 Billie Jean King Cup; Asia/Oceania Zone Group I	R/R	12 April 2022	Antalya, Turkey	China	Clay	(China) Wang Qiang	L	4–6, 0–6
2022 Billie Jean King Cup; Asia/Oceania Zone Group I	R/R	14 April 2022	Antalya, Turkey	Japan	Clay	(Japan) Moyuka Uchijima	L	0–6, 1–6
2022 Billie Jean King Cup; Asia/Oceania Zone Group I	R/R	15 April 2022	Antalya, Turkey	India	Clay	(India) Ankita Raina	L	5–7, 3–6

=== Doubles (6–3) ===
Edition	Stage	Date	Location	Against	Surface	Partner	Opponents	W/L	Score
2019 Fed Cup; Asia/Oceania Zone Group II	R/R	19 June 2019	Kuala Lumpur, Malaysia	Bangladesh	Hard	Erin Routliffe	(Bangladesh) Mashfia Afrin (Bangladesh) Susmita Sen	W	6–0, 6–1
2022 Billie Jean King Cup; Asia/Oceania Zone Group I	R/R	13 April 2022	Antalya, Turkey	(South Korea) Korea	Clay	Erin Routliffe	(South Korea) Kim Dabin (South Korea) Kim Na-ri	L	2–6, 6–2, 6–7^{(6–8)}
2022 Billie Jean King Cup; Asia/Oceania Zone Group I	R/R	14 April 2022	Antalya, Turkey	Japan	Clay	Erin Routliffe	(Japan) Shuko Aoyama (Japan) Ena Shibahara	L	3–6, 6–4, 2–6
2022 Billie Jean King Cup; Asia/Oceania Zone Group I	R/R	15 April 2022	Antalya, Turkey	India	Clay	Erin Routliffe	(India) Sowjanya Bavisetti (India) Riya Bhatia	W	6–2, 6–0
2022 Billie Jean King Cup; Asia/Oceania Zone Group I	R/R	16 April 2022	Antalya, Turkey	Indonesia	Clay	Erin Routliffe	(Indonesia) Jessy Rompies (Indonesia) Aldila Sutjiadi	W	6–3, 4–6, 7–6^{(7–3)}

== Personal life ==
Hourigan, who was born in Turakina, is of part Māori descent and affiliates to the Ngāti Tūwharetoa iwi.
