= 2022 Billie Jean King Cup Asia/Oceania Zone Group I – Pool A =

Subsection of tennis competition

Pool A of the 2022 Billie Jean King Cup Asia/Oceania Zone Group I was the only pool in the Asia/Oceania zone of the 2020–21 Billie Jean King Cup. Six teams competed in a round robin competition, with the top placing teams advancing to the 2022 Billie Jean King Cup Play-offs.

== Standings ==
		JPN	CHN	IND	KOR	NZL	INA	RR; W–L	Set; W–L	Game; W–L	Standings
1	Japan		2–1	3–0	2–1	3–0	3–0	13–2	26–6 (81%)	182–97 (65%)	1
2	China	1–2		3–0	2–1	3–0	3–0	12–3	25–6 (81%)	177–110 (62%)	2
4	India	0–3	0–3		2–1	2–1	2–1	6–9	13–19 (41%)	127–155 (45%)	3
3	South Korea	1–2	1–2	1–2		3–0	3–0	9–6	20–15 (57%)	161–146 (52%)	4
6	New Zealand	0–3	0–3	1–2	0–3		2–1	3–12	8–25 (24%)	110–178 (38%)	5
5	Indonesia	0–3	0–3	1–2	0–3	1–2		2–13	6–27 (18%)	109–180 (38%)	6

Standings are determined by: 1. number of wins; 2. number of matches; 3. in two-team ties, head-to-head records; 4. in three-team ties, (a) percentage of matches won (head-to-head records if two teams remain tied), then (b) percentage of sets won (head-to-head records if two teams remain tied), then (c) percentage of games won (head-to-head records if two teams remain tied), then (d) Billie Jean King Cup rankings.

== Round-robin ==
=== Japan vs. India ===
Japan
3
Megasaray Tennis Academy, Antalya, Turkey
12 April 2022
Clay

India
0

			1	2	3
1	(Japan) (India)	Yuki Naito; Rutuja Bhosale	6; 0	6; 4
2	(Japan) (India)	Mai Hontama; Ankita Raina	6; 4	6; 4
3	(Japan) (India)	Shuko Aoyama / Ena Shibahara; Sowjanya Bavisetti / Riya Bhatia	6; 0	6; 4

=== China vs. New Zealand ===
China
3
Megasaray Tennis Academy, Antalya, Turkey
12 April 2022
Clay

New Zealand
0

			1	2	3
1	(China) (New Zealand)	Yuan Yue; Vivian Yang	7; 5	6; 2
2	(China) (New Zealand)	Wang Qiang; Paige Hourigan	6; 4	6; 0
3	(China) (New Zealand)	Xu Yifan / Yang Zhaoxuan; Valentina Ivanov / Erin Routliffe	6; 3	6; 1

=== South Korea vs. Indonesia ===
South Korea
3
Megasaray Tennis Academy, Antalya, Turkey
12 April 2022
Clay

Indonesia
0

			1	2	3
1	(South Korea) (Indonesia)	Han Na-lae; Beatrice Gumulya	6; 0	6; 3
2	(South Korea) (Indonesia)	Jang Su-jeong; Aldila Sutjiadi	6; 4	6; 1
3	(South Korea) (Indonesia)	Kim Da-bin / Park So-hyun; Beatrice Gumulya / Jessy Rompies	6; 4	1; 6	7^{11} 6^{9}

=== Japan vs. Indonesia ===
Japan
3
Megasaray Tennis Academy, Antalya, Turkey
13 April 2022
Clay

Indonesia
0

			1	2	3
1	(Japan) (Indonesia)	Moyuka Uchijima; Fadona Titalyana Kusumawati	6; 2	6; 0
2	(Japan) (Indonesia)	Mai Hontama; Aldila Sutjiadi	6; 2	6; 1
3	(Japan) (Indonesia)	Shuko Aoyama / Ena Shibahara; Beatrice Gumulya / Jessy Rompies	6; 4	6; 2

=== China vs. India ===
China
3
Megasaray Tennis Academy, Antalya, Turkey
13 April 2022
Clay

India
0

			1	2	3
1	(China) (India)	Zhu Lin; Riya Bhatia	6; 1	6; 3
2	(China) (India)	Wang Qiang; Ankita Raina	6; 4	6; 2
3	(China) (India)	Xu Yifan / Yang Zhaoxuan; Sowjanya Bavisetti / Rutuja Bhosale	7; 5	6; 1

=== South Korea vs. New Zealand ===
South Korea
3
Megasaray Tennis Academy, Antalya, Turkey
13 April 2022
Clay

New Zealand
0

			1	2	3
1	(South Korea) (New Zealand)	Han Na-lae; Vivian Yang	6; 0	6; 2
2	(South Korea) (New Zealand)	Jang Su-jeong; Valentina Ivanov	6; 3	6; 2
3	(South Korea) (New Zealand)	Kim Da-bin / Kim Na-ri; Paige Hourigan / Erin Routliffe	6; 2	2; 6	7^{8} 6^{6}

=== Japan vs. New Zealand ===
Japan
3
Megasaray Tennis Academy, Antalya, Turkey
14 April 2022
Clay

New Zealand
0

			1	2	3
1	(Japan) (New Zealand)	Yuki Naito; Valentina Ivanov	6; 2	6; 1
2	(Japan) (New Zealand)	Moyuka Uchijima; Paige Hourigan	6; 0	6; 1
3	(Japan) (New Zealand)	Shuko Aoyama / Ena Shibahara; Paige Hourigan / Erin Routliffe	6; 3	4; 6	6; 2

=== China vs. South Korea ===
China
2
Megasaray Tennis Academy, Antalya, Turkey
14 April 2022
Clay

South Korea
1

			1	2	3
1	(China) (South Korea)	Zhu Lin; Park So-hyun	7; 5	6; 3
2	(China) (South Korea)	Wang Qiang; Han Na-lae	6; 2	2; 6	5; 7
3	(China) (South Korea)	Xu Yifan / Yang Zhaoxuan; Han Na-lae / Kim Na-ri	6; 3	6; 2

=== India vs. Indonesia ===
India
2
Megasaray Tennis Academy, Antalya, Turkey
14 April 2022
Clay

Indonesia
1

			1	2	3
1	(India) (Indonesia)	Rutuja Bhosale; Beatrice Gumulya	6; 4	6; 1
2	(India) (Indonesia)	Ankita Raina; Aldila Sutjiadi	6; 1	6; 2
3	(India) (Indonesia)	Sowjanya Bavisetti / Riya Bhatia; Jessy Rompies / Aldila Sutjiadi	4; 6	7^{9} 6^{7}	2; 6

=== Japan vs. South Korea ===
Japan
2
Megasaray Tennis Academy, Antalya, Turkey
15 April 2022
Clay

South Korea
1

			1	2	3
1	(Japan) (South Korea)	Moyuka Uchijima; Park So-hyun	6; 1	6; 3
2	(Japan) (South Korea)	Mai Hontama; Jang Su-jeong	3; 6	2; 6
3	(Japan) (South Korea)	Shuko Aoyama / Ena Shibahara; Han Na-lae / Kim Na-ri	4; 6	6; 2	6; 3

=== China vs. Indonesia ===
China
3
Megasaray Tennis Academy, Antalya, Turkey
15 April 2022
Clay

Indonesia
0

			1	2	3
1	(China) (Indonesia)	Yuan Yue; Fadona Titalyana Kusumawati	6; 1	6; 1
2	(China) (Indonesia)	Wang Qiang; Aldila Sutjiadi	7; 5	6; 1
3	(China) (Indonesia)	Yuan Yue / Zhu Lin; Beatrice Gumulya / Jessy Rompies	6; 2	6; 4

=== India vs. New Zealand ===
India
2
Megasaray Tennis Academy, Antalya, Turkey
15 April 2022
Clay

New Zealand
1

			1	2	3
1	(India) (New Zealand)	Rutuja Bhosale; Valentina Ivanov	6; 1	7^{7} 6^{3}
2	(India) (New Zealand)	Ankita Raina; Paige Hourigan	7; 5	6; 3
3	(India) (New Zealand)	Sowjanya Bavisetti / Riya Bhatia; Paige Hourigan / Erin Routliffe	2; 6	0; 6

=== Japan vs. China ===
Japan
2
Megasaray Tennis Academy, Antalya, Turkey
16 April 2022
Clay

China
1

			1	2	3
1	(Japan) (China)	Yuki Naito; Yuan Yue	6^{3} 7^{7}	6^{5} 7^{7}
2	(Japan) (China)	Moyuka Uchijima; Zhu Lin	7^{7} 6^{5}	6; 1
3	(Japan) (China)	Shuko Aoyama / Ena Shibahara; Xu Yifan / Yang Zhaoxuan	6; 4	6; 3

=== South Korea vs. India ===
South Korea
1
Megasaray Tennis Academy, Antalya, Turkey
16 April 2022
Clay

India
2

			1	2	3
1	(South Korea) (India)	Kim Na-ri; Riya Bhatia	3; 6	6; 2	3; 6
2	(South Korea) (India)	Kim Da-bin; Ankita Raina	2; 6	3; 6
3	(South Korea) (India)	Han Na-lae / Kim Na-ri; Sowjanya Bavisetti / Riya Bhatia	6; 1	6; 3

=== Indonesia vs. New Zealand ===
Indonesia
1
Megasaray Tennis Academy, Antalya, Turkey
16 April 2022
Clay

New Zealand
2

			1	2	3
1	(Indonesia) (New Zealand)	Beatrice Gumulya; Vivian Yang	5; 7	2; 6
2	(Indonesia) (New Zealand)	Aldila Sutjiadi; Katherine Westbury	6; 1	6; 1
3	(Indonesia) (New Zealand)	Jessy Rompies / Aldila Sutjiadi; Paige Hourigan / Erin Routliffe	3; 6	6; 4	6^{3} 7^{7}
