= 2019 Fed Cup Asia/Oceania Zone Group II – play-offs =

Subsection of tennis competition

The play-offs of the 2019 Fed Cup Asia/Oceania Zone Group II were the final stages of the Group II Zonal Competition involving teams from Asia and Oceania. Using the positions determined in their pools, the thirteen teams faced off to determine their placing in the 2019 Fed Cup Asia/Oceania Zone Group II. The top team advanced to Asia/Oceania Group I in 2020.

== Pool results ==
Placing	Pool A (Dushanbe)	Pool B (Dushanbe)	Pool A (Kuala Lumpur)	Pool B (Kuala Lumpur)
1	Chinese Taipei	Singapore	Uzbekistan	Hong Kong
2	Philippines	Sri Lanka	Malaysia	New Zealand
3	Tajikistan	Iran	Turkmenistan	Pakistan
4	—			Bangladesh

== Promotional play-offs ==
The first placed teams of the pools were drawn in head-to-head rounds. The winners advanced to the Asia/Oceania Group I in 2020.

=== Chinese Taipei vs. Singapore ===
Chinese Taipei
2
Pamir Stadium, Dushanbe, Tajikistan
15 June
Hard

Singapore
0

			1	2	3
1	(Chinese Taipei) (Singapore)	Hsu Chieh-yu; Lynelle En Tong Lim	6; 1	6; 0
2	(Chinese Taipei) (Singapore)	Liang En-shuo; Charmaine Shi Yi Seah	6; 4	6; 2
3	(Chinese Taipei) (Singapore)	Chan Hao-ching / Latisha Chan; Hx Izabella Tan / Ashley Kei Yim				not played

=== Uzbekistan vs. Hong Kong ===
Uzbekistan
2
National Tennis Centre, Kuala Lumpur, Malaysia
22 June
Hard

Hong Kong
1

			1	2	3
1	(Uzbekistan) (Hong Kong)	Nigina Abduraimova; Wu Ho-ching	6^{4} 7^{7}	4; 6
2	(Uzbekistan) (Hong Kong)	Sabina Sharipova; Eudice Chong	7; 5	6; 0
3	(Uzbekistan) (Hong Kong)	Nigina Abduraimova / Akgul Amanmuradova; Eudice Chong / Cody Wong Hong-yi	6; 2	4; 6	6; 3

== 3rd to 4th play-offs ==
The second placed teams of the pools were drawn in head-to-head rounds to find the equal third to equal fourth placed teams.

=== Philippines vs. Sri Lanka ===
Philippines
2
Pamir Stadium, Dushanbe, Tajikistan
15 June
Hard

Sri Lanka
0

			1	2	3
1	(Philippines) (Sri Lanka)	Khim Iglupas; Rukshika Wijesooriya	1; 6	6; 1	6; 0
2	(Philippines) (Sri Lanka)	Marian Capadocia; Savini Jayasuriya	6; 3	6; 1
3	(Philippines) (Sri Lanka)	Marian Capadocia / Khim Iglupas; Janali Manamperi / Oneli Perera				not played

=== New Zealand vs. Malaysia ===
New Zealand
2
National Tennis Centre, Kuala Lumpur, Malaysia
22 June
Hard

Malaysia
1

			1	2	3
1	(New Zealand) (Malaysia)	Valentina Ivanov; Sara Nayar	5; 7	5; 7
2	(New Zealand) (Malaysia)	Erin Routliffe; Sharifah Elysia Wan Abdul Rahman	6; 0	6; 0
3	(New Zealand) (Malaysia)	Valentina Ivanov / Erin Routliffe; Sara Nayar / Jawairiah Noordin	6; 3	4; 6	6; 3

== 5th to 6th play-offs ==
The third placed teams of the pools were drawn in head-to-head rounds to find the equal fifth to equal sixth placed teams.

=== Iran vs. Tajikistan ===
Iran
2
Pamir Stadium, Dushanbe, Tajikistan
15 June
Hard

Tajikistan
1

			1	2	3
1	(Iran) (Tajikistan)	Dorsa Cheraghi; Diana Ivanikhina	6; 2	6; 1
2	(Iran) (Tajikistan)	Mahta Khanloo; Anastasiya Tursunova	1; 6	1; 6
3	(Iran) (Tajikistan)	Dorsa Cheraghi / Mahta Khanloo; Diana Ivanikhina / Anastasiya Tursunova	7; 5	7; 5

=== Pakistan vs. Turkmenistan ===
Pakistan
1
National Tennis Centre, Kuala Lumpur, Malaysia
22 June
Hard

Turkmenistan
2

			1	2	3
1	(Pakistan) (Turkmenistan)	Sara Mansoor; Arzuv Klycheva	6; 0	6; 3
2	(Pakistan) (Turkmenistan)	Sarah Mahboob Khan; Guljan Muhammetkuliyeva	2; 6	1; 6
3	(Pakistan) (Turkmenistan)	Sarah Mahboob Khan / Sara Mansoor; Anastasiya Azimbayeva / Guljan Muhammetkuliyeva	4; 6	5; 7

== Final placements ==
Placing	Teams	
Promoted/First	Chinese Taipei	Uzbekistan
Second	Singapore	Hong Kong
Third	Philippines	New Zealand
Fourth	Sri Lanka	Malaysia
Fifth	Iran	Turkmenistan
Sixth	Tajikistan	Pakistan
Seventh	Bangladesh	

- Chinese Taipei and Uzbekistan were promoted to Asia/Oceania Zone Group I in 2020.

== See also ==
- Fed Cup structure
