= 2019 Fed Cup Asia/Oceania Zone Group I – play-offs =

Subsection of tennis competition

The play-offs of the 2019 Fed Cup Asia/Oceania Zone Group I were the final stages of the Group I Zonal Competition involving teams from Asia and Oceania. Using the positions determined in their pools, the six teams faced off to determine their placing in the 2019 Fed Cup Asia/Oceania Zone Group I. The winner of the promotional play-off advanced to the World Group II play-offs, while the losers of the relegation play-off was relegated to the Asia/Oceania Zone Group II along with the bottom team of Pool B in 2020.

== Pool results ==
Placing	Pool A	Pool B
1	Kazakhstan	China
2	India	South Korea
3	Thailand	Indonesia
4	—N/a	Pacific Oceania

== Promotion play-off ==
The first placed teams of the two pools will be drawn in head-to-head rounds. The winner will advance to the World Group II play-offs.

=== China vs. Kazakhstan ===
China
1
Daulet National Tennis Centre, Astana, Kazakhstan
9 February
Hard (indoor)

Kazakhstan
2

			1	2	3
1	(China) (Kazakhstan)	Zheng Saisai; Zarina Diyas	3; 6	2; 6
2	(China) (Kazakhstan)	Zhang Shuai; Yulia Putintseva	6; 3	3; 6	6; 4
3	(China) (Kazakhstan)	Yang Zhaoxuan / Zheng Saisai; Anna Danilina / Galina Voskoboeva	5; 7	0; 6

== 3rd place play-off ==
The second placed teams of the two pools will be drawn in head-to-head rounds to determine the third placed team.

=== India vs. South Korea ===
India
1
Daulet National Tennis Centre, Astana, Kazakhstan
9 February
Hard (indoor)

South Korea
2

			1	2	3
1	(India) (South Korea)	Mahak Jain; Kim Na-ri	2; 6	6; 3	1; 6
2	(India) (South Korea)	Ankita Raina; Jeong Su-nam	6; 3	6; 3
3	(India) (South Korea)	Ankita Raina / Prarthana Thombare; Jang Su-jeong / Kim Na-ri	4; 6	4; 6

== Relegation play-off ==
The third placed teams of the two pools will be drawn in head-to-head rounds. The loser will be relegated to Asia/Oceania Zone Group II in 2020.

=== Indonesia vs. Thailand ===
Indonesia
2
Daulet National Tennis Centre, Astana, Kazakhstan
9 February
Hard (indoor)

Thailand
1

			1	2	3
1	(Indonesia) (Thailand)	Aldila Sutjiadi; Nudnida Luangnam	3; 6	6; 0	7^{7} 6^{5}
2	(Indonesia) (Thailand)	Beatrice Gumulya; Peangtarn Plipuech	7; 5	4; 6	4; 6
3	(Indonesia) (Thailand)	Jessy Rompies / Aldila Sutjiadi; Nudnida Luangnam / Peangtarn Plipuech	6; 2	7^{7} 6^{3}

== Final placements ==
Placing	Teams
Promoted/First	Kazakhstan
Second	China
Third	South Korea
Fourth	India
Fifth	Indonesia
Relegated/Sixth	Thailand
Relegated/Seventh	Pacific Oceania

- Kazakhstan was promoted to the 2019 Fed Cup World Group II play-offs.
- Thailand and Pacific Oceania were relegated to Asia/Oceania Zone Group II in 2020.

== See also ==
- Fed Cup structure
