= 2019 Fed Cup Europe/Africa Zone Group III – Pool A (Helsinki) =

Subsection of tennis competition

Pool A (Helsinki) of the 2019 Fed Cup Europe/Africa Group III was one of four pools in the Europe/Africa Group III of the 2019 Fed Cup. Four teams competed in a round robin competition, with the top team and bottom teams proceeding to their respective section of the play-offs: the top team played for advancement to Group II.

== Standings ==
| | | FIN | LTU | MLT | ISL | RR; W–L | Set; W–L | Game; W–L | Standings |
| 8 | Finland | | 2–1 | 3–0 | 3–0 | 3–0 | 16–2 (89%) | 105–32 (77%) | 1 |
| 2 | Lithuania | 1–2 | | 3–0 | 3–0 | 2–1 | 14–4 (78%) | 101–35 (74%) | 2 |
| 9 | Malta | 0–3 | 0–3 | | 2–1 | 1–2 | 4–15 (21%) | 34–101 (25%) | 3 |
| 15 | Iceland | 0–3 | 0–3 | 1–2 | | 0–3 | 3–16 (16%) | 32–104 (24%) | 4 |

Standings are determined by: 1. number of wins; 2. if two teams have the same number of wins, head-to-head record; 3. if three teams have the same number of wins, (a) number of matches won in the group, then (b) percentage of sets won in the group, then (c) percentage of games won in the group, then (d) Fed Cup rankings.

== Round robin ==
=== Finland vs. Iceland ===
Finland
3
Tali Tennis Center, Helsinki, Finland
15 April 2019
Hard (indoor)

Iceland
0

| | | | 1 | 2 | 3 |
|---|---|---|---|---|---|
| 1 | (Finland) (Iceland) | Mia Eklund; Anna Soffía Grönholm | 6; 0 | 6; 1 |
| 2 | (Finland) (Iceland) | Anastasia Kulikova; Iris Staub | 6; 0 | 6; 0 |
| 3 | (Finland) (Iceland) | Anastasia Kulikova / Emma Laine; Anna Soffía Grönholm / Iris Staub | 6; 0 | 6; 0 |

=== Lithuania vs. Iceland ===
Lithuania
3
Tali Tennis Center, Helsinki, Finland
16 April 2019
Hard (indoor)

Iceland
0

| | | | 1 | 2 | 3 |
|---|---|---|---|---|---|
| 1 | (Lithuania) (Iceland) | Iveta Daujotaitė; Anna Soffía Grönholm | 6; 0 | 6; 1 |
| 2 | (Lithuania) (Iceland) | Joana Eidukonytė; Iris Staub | 6; 0 | 6; 0 |
| 3 | (Lithuania) (Iceland) | Iveta Daujotaitė / Joana Eidukonytė; Anna Soffía Grönholm / Iris Staub | 6; 1 | 6; 0 |

=== Finland vs. Malta ===
Finland
3
Tali Tennis Center, Helsinki, Finland
16 April 2019
Hard (indoor)

Malta
0

| | | | 1 | 2 | 3 |
|---|---|---|---|---|---|
| 1 | (Finland) (Malta) | Mia Eklund; Krysta Dimech | 6; 0 | 6; 0 |
| 2 | (Finland) (Malta) | Anastasia Kulikova; Maja Glumac | 6; 1 | 6; 0 |
| 3 | (Finland) (Malta) | Mia Eklund / Emma Laine; Elaine Genovese / Maja Glumac | 6; 0 | 6; 1 |

=== Lithuania vs. Malta ===
Lithuania
3
Tali Tennis Center, Helsinki, Finland
17 April 2019
Hard (indoor)

Malta
0

| | | | 1 | 2 | 3 |
|---|---|---|---|---|---|
| 1 | (Lithuania) (Malta) | Iveta Daujotaitė; Krysta Dimech | 6; 0 | 6; 0 |
| 2 | (Lithuania) (Malta) | Joana Eidukonytė; Maria Giorgia Farrugia Sacco | 6; 0 | 6; 0 |
| 3 | (Lithuania) (Malta) | Iveta Daujotaitė / Joana Eidukonytė; Maria Giorgia Farrugia Sacco / Maja Glumac | 6; 0 | 6; 0 |

=== Malta vs. Iceland ===
Malta
2
Tali Tennis Center, Helsinki, Finland
18 April 2019
Hard (indoor)

Iceland
1

| | | | 1 | 2 | 3 |
|---|---|---|---|---|---|
| 1 | (Malta) (Iceland) | Maria Giorgia Farrugia Sacco; Anna Soffía Grönholm | 3; 6 | 0; 6 |
| 2 | (Malta) (Iceland) | Elaine Genovese; Iris Staub | 6; 2 | 6; 0 |
| 3 | (Malta) (Iceland) | Maria Giorgia Farrugia Sacco / Elaine Genovese; Anna Soffía Grönholm / Iris Staub | 6; 3 | 4; 6 | 7^{9} 6^{7} |

=== Lithuania vs. Finland ===
Lithuania
1
Tali Tennis Center, Helsinki, Finland
19 April 2019
Hard (indoor)

Finland
2

| | | | 1 | 2 | 3 |
|---|---|---|---|---|---|
| 1 | (Lithuania) (Finland) | Iveta Daujotaitė; Mia Eklund | 6; 2 | 7^{8} 6^{6} |
| 2 | (Lithuania) (Finland) | Joana Eidukonytė; Anastasia Kulikova | 2; 6 | 4; 6 |
| 3 | (Lithuania) (Finland) | Iveta Daujotaitė / Joana Eidukonytė; Anastasia Kulikova / Emma Laine | 6^{1} 7^{7} | 4; 6 |

== See also ==
- Fed Cup structure
