= 2019 Fed Cup Asia/Oceania Zone Group II – Pool B (Dushanbe) =

Subsection of tennis competition

Pool B (Dushanbe) of the 2019 Fed Cup Asia/Oceania Zone Group II was one of four pools in the Asia/Oceania zone of the 2019 Fed Cup. Three teams competed in a round robin competition, with the top team and the bottom team proceeding to their respective sections of the play-offs: the top team played for advancement to Group I.

== Standings ==
		SGP	SRI	IRI	RR; W–L	Set; W–L	Game; W–L	Standings
4	Singapore		2–1	3–0	2–0	10–1 (91%)	74–49 (60%)	1
7	Sri Lanka	1–2		2–1	1–1	5–6 (45%)	60–62 (49%)	2
11	Iran	0–3	1–2		0–2	3–11 (21%)	46–69 (40%)	3

Standings are determined by: 1. number of wins; 2. number of matches; 3. in two-team ties, head-to-head records; 4. in three-team ties, (a) percentage of sets won (head-to-head records if two teams remain tied), then (b) percentage of games won (head-to-head records if two teams remain tied), then (c) Fed Cup rankings.

== Round-robin ==
=== Sri Lanka vs. Iran ===
Sri Lanka
2
Pamir Stadium, Dushanbe, Tajikistan
12 June
Hard

Iran
1

			1	2	3
1	(Sri Lanka) (Iran)	Anjalika Kurera; Dorsa Cheraghi	6; 4	6; 2
2	(Sri Lanka) (Iran)	Savini Jayasuriya; Mahta Khanloo	6; 2	0; 6	0; 6
3	(Sri Lanka) (Iran)	Janali Manamperi / Rukshika Wijesooriya; Kimiya Asbaghipour / Mahta Khanloo	6; 3	6; 4

=== Singapore vs. Iran ===
Singapore
3
Pamir Stadium, Dushanbe, Tajikistan
13 June
Hard

Iran
0

			1	2	3
1	(Singapore) (Iran)	Lynelle En Tong Lim; Dorsa Cheraghi	7^{8} 6^{6}	2; 6	6; 2
2	(Singapore) (Iran)	Charmaine Shi Yi Seah; Mahta Khanloo	6; 1	6; 0
3	(Singapore) (Iran)	Hx Izabella Tan / Ashley Kei Yim; Kimiya Asbaghipour / Fatemehsadat Zanjani	6; 1	6; 3

=== Singapore vs. Sri Lanka ===
Singapore
2
Pamir Stadium, Dushanbe, Tajikistan
14 June
Hard

Sri Lanka
1

			1	2	3
1	(Singapore) (Sri Lanka)	Lynelle En Tong Lim; Anjalika Kurera	4; 6	5; 7
2	(Singapore) (Sri Lanka)	Charmaine Shi Yi Seah; Savini Jayasuriya	6; 3	7^{9} 6^{7}
3	(Singapore) (Sri Lanka)	Charmaine Shi Yi Seah / Ashley Kei Yim; Anjalika Kurera / Janali Manamperi	7^{7} 6^{4}	3; 2		retired
