= 2019 Fed Cup Asia/Oceania Zone Group II – Pool B (Kuala Lumpur) =

Subsection of tennis competition

Pool B (Kuala Lumpur) of the 2019 Fed Cup Asia/Oceania Zone Group II was one of four pools in the Asia/Oceania zone of the 2019 Fed Cup. Four teams competed in a round robin competition, with the top team and the bottom team proceeding to their respective sections of the play-offs: the top team played for advancement to Group I.

== Standings ==
		HKG	NZL	PAK	BAN	RR; W–L	Set; W–L	Game; W–L	Standings
3	Hong Kong		2–1	3–0	3–0	3–0	16–3 (84%)	104–33 (76%)	1
6	New Zealand	1–2		3–0	3–0	2–1	15–4 (79%)	100–34 (75%)	2
9	Pakistan	0–3	0–3		3–0	1–2	6–12 (33%)	39–85 (31%)	3
13	Bangladesh	0–3	0–3	0–3		0–3	0–18 (0%)	17–108 (14%)	4

Standings are determined by: 1. number of wins; 2. number of matches; 3. in two-team ties, head-to-head records; 4. in three-team ties, (a) percentage of sets won (head-to-head records if two teams remain tied), then (b) percentage of games won (head-to-head records if two teams remain tied), then (c) Fed Cup rankings.

== Round-robin ==
=== Hong Kong vs. Pakistan ===
Hong Kong
3
National Tennis Centre, Kuala Lumpur, Malaysia
19 June
Hard

Pakistan
0

			1	2	3
1	(Hong Kong) (Pakistan)	Wu Ho-ching; Sara Mansoor	6; 0	6; 0
2	(Hong Kong) (Pakistan)	Eudice Chong; Sarah Mahboob Khan	6; 0	6; 1
3	(Hong Kong) (Pakistan)	Ng Kwan-yau / Cody Wong Hong-yi; Meheq Khokhar / Sarah Mahboob Khan	6; 0	6; 1

=== New Zealand vs. Bangladesh ===
New Zealand
3
National Tennis Centre, Kuala Lumpur, Malaysia
19 June
Hard

Bangladesh
0

			1	2	3
1	(New Zealand) (Bangladesh)	Emily Fanning; Jarin Sultana Jolly	6; 0	6; 0
2	(New Zealand) (Bangladesh)	Paige Hourigan; Eshita Afrose	6; 0	6; 0
3	(New Zealand) (Bangladesh)	Paige Hourigan / Erin Routliffe; Mashfia Afrin / Susmita Sen	6; 0	6; 1

=== Hong Kong vs. Bangladesh ===
Hong Kong
3
National Tennis Centre, Kuala Lumpur, Malaysia
20 June
Hard

Bangladesh
0

			1	2	3
1	(Hong Kong) (Bangladesh)	Wu Ho-ching; Susmita Sen	6; 0	6; 0
2	(Hong Kong) (Bangladesh)	Eudice Chong; Mashfia Afrin	6; 0	6; 0
3	(Hong Kong) (Bangladesh)	Ng Kwan-yau / Cody Wong Hong-yi; Eshita Afrose / Jarin Sultana Jolly	6; 2	6; 1

=== New Zealand vs. Pakistan ===
New Zealand
3
National Tennis Centre, Kuala Lumpur, Malaysia
20 June
Hard

Pakistan
0

			1	2	3
1	(New Zealand) (Pakistan)	Valentina Ivanov; Meheq Khokhar	6; 0	6; 0
2	(New Zealand) (Pakistan)	Paige Hourigan; Sarah Mahboob Khan	6; 0	6; 0
3	(New Zealand) (Pakistan)	Valentina Ivanov / Erin Routliffe; Meheq Khokhar / Noor Malik	6; 0	6; 1

=== Hong Kong vs. New Zealand ===
Hong Kong
2
National Tennis Centre, Kuala Lumpur, Malaysia
21 June
Hard

New Zealand
1

			1	2	3
1	(Hong Kong) (New Zealand)	Cody Wong Hong-yi; Emily Fanning	6; 2	6; 3
2	(Hong Kong) (New Zealand)	Eudice Chong; Paige Hourigan	4; 6	6; 4	6; 1
3	(Hong Kong) (New Zealand)	Ng Kwan-yau / Wu Ho-ching; Valentina Ivanov / Erin Routliffe	2; 6	2; 6

=== Pakistan vs. Bangladesh ===
Pakistan
3
National Tennis Centre, Kuala Lumpur, Malaysia
21 June
Hard

Bangladesh
0

			1	2	3
1	(Pakistan) (Bangladesh)	Sara Mansoor; Jarin Sultana Jolly	6; 0	6; 2
2	(Pakistan) (Bangladesh)	Sarah Mahboob Khan; Eshita Afrose	6; 1	6; 2
3	(Pakistan) (Bangladesh)	Meheq Khokhar / Noor Malik; Mashfia Afrin / Susmita Sen	6; 4	6; 4
