= 2013 Fed Cup Asia/Oceania Zone Group I – play-offs =

The play-offs of the 2013 Fed Cup Asia/Oceania Zone Group I were the final stages of the Group I Zonal Competition involving teams from Asia and Oceania. Using the positions determined in their pools, the seven teams faced off to determine their placing in the 2013 Fed Cup Asia/Oceania Zone Group I. The top team advanced to the World Group II, and the bottom team was relegated down to the Group II for the next year.

== Pool Standings ==
Placing	Pool A	Pool B
1	Kazakhstan	Uzbekistan
2	Thailand	China
3	–	Chinese Taipei
4	India	South Korea

== Promotion play-offs ==
The first placed teams of each pool were drawn in a head-to-head round. The winner of the round advanced to the World Group II play-offs, where they'd get a chance to advanced to World Group II.

=== Kazakhstan vs. Uzbekistan ===
Kazakhstan
2
National Tennis Centre, Astana, Kazakhstan
February 9, 2013
Hard (indoors)

Uzbekistan
1

			1	2	3
1	(Kazakhstan) (Uzbekistan)	Ksenia Pervak; Nigina Abduraimova	6; 0	6; 4
2	(Kazakhstan) (Uzbekistan)	Yaroslava Shvedova; Akgul Amanmuradova	6; 1	5; 7	4; 6
3	(Kazakhstan) (Uzbekistan)	Yaroslava Shvedova / Galina Voskoboeva; Nigina Abduraimova / Akgul Amanmuradova	6; 2	6; 4

== 3rd to 4th play-offs ==
The second placed teams of each pool were drawn in head-to-head rounds to find the third and fourth placed teams.

=== China vs. Thailand ===
China
1
National Tennis Centre, Astana, Kazakhstan
February 9, 2013
Hard (indoors)

Thailand
2

			1	2	3
1	(China) (Thailand)	Tang Haochen; Noppawan Lertcheewakarn	2; 6	7; 5	3; 6
2	(China) (Thailand)	Wang Qiang; Nudnida Luangnam	6; 4	6; 2
3	(China) (Thailand)	Tang Haochen / Zhou Yimiao; Luksika Kumkhum / Varatchaya Wongteanchai	3; 6	6; 4	5; 7

== Relegation play-offs ==
The last placed teams of each pool were drawn in a head-to-head round. The loser of each round was relegated down to Asia/Oceania Zone Group II in 2013.

=== India vs. South Korea ===
India
0
National Tennis Centre, Astana, Kazakhstan
February 9, 2013
Hard (indoors)

South Korea
3

			1	2	3
1	(India) (South Korea)	Rutuja Bhosale; Lee Ye-ra	6^{5} 7^{7}	1; 6
2	(India) (South Korea)	Rishika Sunkara; Han Sung-hee	4; 6	3; 6
3	(India) (South Korea)	Kyra Shroff / Rishika Sunkara; Kang Seo-kyung / Yoo Mi				w/o

== Final Placements ==
Placing	Team
Promoted	Kazakhstan
Second	Uzbekistan
Third	Thailand
Fourth	China
Fifth	Chinese Taipei
Sixth	South Korea
Relegated	India

- Kazakhstan advanced to the World Group II play-offs, and were drawn against France. They lost 1–4, and thus was relegated back to Group I for 2014.
- India was relegated down to 2014 Fed Cup Asia/Oceania Zone Group II.

== See also ==
- Fed Cup structure
