= 2013 Fed Cup Asia/Oceania Zone Group I – Pool A =

Group A of the 2013 Fed Cup Asia/Oceania Zone Group I was one of four pools in the Asia/Oceania zone of the 2013 Fed Cup. Three teams competed in a round robin competition, with the top team and the bottom team proceeding to their respective sections of the play-offs: the top team played for advancement to the World Group II Play-offs, while the bottom team faced potential relegation to Group II.

== Standings ==
		(Kazakhstan) KAZ	(Thailand) THA	(India) IND	RR; W–L	Match; W–L	Set; W–L	Game; W–L	Standings
24	Kazakhstan		2–1	3–0	2–0	5–1	11–3	76–27	1
28	Thailand	1–2		3–0	1–1	4–2	9–6	66–52	2
45	India	0–3	0–3		0–2	0–6	1–12	18–75	3

== Round robin ==
=== Kazakhstan vs. India ===
Kazakhstan
3
National Tennis Centre, Astana, Kazakhstan
February 6, 2013
RuKortHard Tournament F Hard (indoors)

India
0

			1	2	3
1	(Kazakhstan) (India)	Ksenia Pervak; Rishika Sunkara	6; 0	6; 0
2	(Kazakhstan) (India)	Yaroslava Shvedova; Kyra Shroff	6; 1	6; 1
3	(Kazakhstan) (India)	Sesil Karatantcheva / Galina Voskoboeva; Rutuja Bhosale / Ankita Raina	6; 3	6; 1

=== Kazakhstan vs. Thailand ===
Kazakhstan
2
National Tennis Centre, Astana, Kazakhstan
February 7, 2013
RuKortHard Tournament F Hard (indoors)

Thailand
1

			1	2	3
1	(Kazakhstan) (Thailand)	Ksenia Pervak; Nudnida Luangnam	6; 0	6; 1
2	(Kazakhstan) (Thailand)	Yaroslava Shvedova; Luksika Kumkhum	6; 0	4; 6	4; 6
3	(Kazakhstan) (Thailand)	Yaroslava Shvedova / Galina Voskoboeva; Noppawan Lertcheewakarn / Varatchaya Wongteanchai	2; 6	6; 2	6; 0

=== Thailand vs. India ===
Thailand
3
National Tennis Centre, Astana, Kazakhstan
February 8, 2013
RuKortHard Tournament F Hard (indoors)

India
0

			1	2	3
1	(Thailand) (India)	Nudnida Luangnam; Rutuja Bhosale	6; 1	3; 6	6; 1
2	(Thailand) (India)	Luksika Kumkhum; Kyra Shroff	6; 0	6; 0
3	(Thailand) (India)	Noppawan Lertcheewakarn / Varatchaya Wongteanchai; Ankita Raina / Rishika Sunkara	6; 1	6; 3
