= Rutuja Bhosale =

Indian tennis player(born 1996)

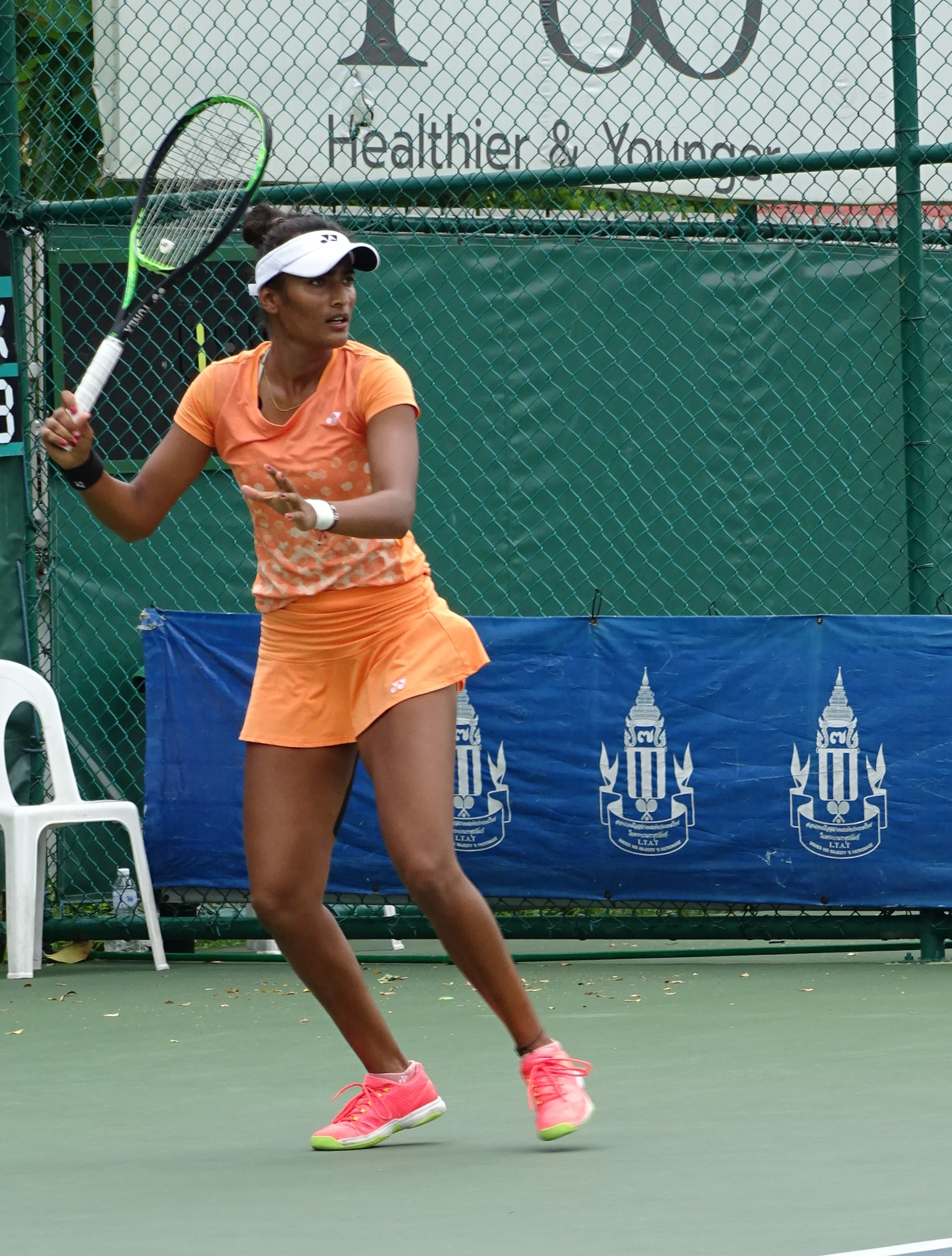
- Bhosale at the ITF Nonthaburi, 2019
- Full name: Rutuja Sampatrao Bhosale
- Country (sports): India
- Born: 27 March 1996 (age 30) Shrirampur, Maharashtra, India
- Plays: Right (two-handed backhand)
- Prize money: $184,700

Singles
- Career record: 196–162
- Career titles: 5 ITF
- Highest ranking: No. 313 (12 June 2023)

Doubles
- Career record: 292–161
- Career titles: 29 ITF
- Highest ranking: No. 114 (12 October 2026)
- Current ranking: No. 114 (12 October 2026)

Team competitions
- Fed Cup: 22–14
Medal record
Women's tennis
Representing India
Asian Games
Gold medal – first place	2022 Hangzhou	Mixed doubles
- Last updated on: 12 October 2026.

Rutuja Sampatrao Bhosale (born 27 March 1996) is an Indian tennis player. She has career-high rankings of world No. 313 in singles, achieved on 12 June 2023, and No. 114 in doubles, achieved on 12 October 2026. Bhosale has won five singles and 29 doubles titles on the ITF circuit. She was also a gold medalist in mixed doubles at the delayed 2022 Asian Games

== Career ==
Bhosale made her debut for India Fed Cup team in 2012, the same year, she achieved her highest junior ranking of world No. 55.

In September 2023, she won the gold medal in the mixed doubles event of the Asian Games, partnering Rohan Bopanna, defeating Chinese Taipei pair Liang En-shuo and Huang Tsung-hao in the final.

In November 2026 at the Chennai Open, Bhosale teamed with Vaishnavi Adkar to become the first all-Indian team to reach a WTA Tour doubles final. They lost to Naïma Karamoko and Simona Waltert.

== Personal life ==
Bhosale attended Texas A&M University in the United States and graduated with a degree in Human Resources and Tourism management in 2017. She married Swapnil Gugale, former captain of Maharashtra Ranji Team, in August 2020.

== WTA Tour finals ==
=== Doubles: 1 (runner-up) ===
Legend WTA 1000 (–) WTA 500 (–) WTA 250 (0–1)	Finals by surface Hard (0–1) Clay (–) Grass (–)

Result	W–L	Date	Tournament	Tier	Surface	Partner	Opponents	Score
Loss	0–1	Nov 2026	Chennai Open, India	WTA 250	Hard	(India) Vaishnavi Adkar	(Switzerland) Naïma Karamoko (Switzerland) Simona Waltert	2–6, 0–6

== WTA 125 finals ==
=== Doubles: 3 (3 runner-ups) ===
Result	W–L	Date	Tournament	Surface	Partner	Opponents	Score
Loss	0–1	Oct 2025	Jinan Open, China	Hard	(China) Zheng Wushuang	Elena Pridankina; Ekaterina Reyngold	1–6, 3–6
Loss	0–2	Sep 2026	Caldas da Rainha Ladies Open, Portugal	Hard	(Australia) Elena Micic	(Australia) Gabriella Da Silva-Fick (Kazakhstan) Zhibek Kulambayeva	6–3, 6–7^{(5–7)}, [7–10]
Loss	0–3	Oct 2026	Samsun Open, Turkey	Hard	(Australia) Elena Micic	Elena Pridankina; Anastasia Tikhonova	6–7^{(5–7)}, 7–6^{(9–7)}, [3–10]

== ITF Circuit finals ==
=== Singles: 5 (5 titles) ===
Legend W25 tournaments W15 tournaments	Finals by surface Hard (4–0) Clay (1–0)

Result	W–L	Date	Location	Tier	Surface	Opponent	Score
Win	1–0	Jun 2017	ITF Aurangabad, India	W15	Clay	(India) Mahak Jain	6–4, 6–4
Win	2–0	Sep 2017	ITF Hua Hin, Thailand	W15	Hard	(Chinese Taipei) Lee Hua-chen	6–4, 2–6, 7–5
Win	3–0	Oct 2020	ITF Sharm El Sheikh, Egypt	W15	Hard	(Czech Republic) Anna Sisková	6–3, 7–5
Win	4–0	Dec 2021	ITF Solapur, India	W15	Hard	(India) Vaidehi Chaudhari	4–6, 7–5, 6–1
Win	5–0	Jun 2023	ITF La Marsa, Tunisia	W25	Hard	Anastasia Gasanova	0–6, 6–3, 6–4

=== Doubles: 49 (29 titles, 20 runner-ups) ===
Legend
W60/75 tournaments
W50 tournaments
W25/35 tournaments
W10/15 tournaments

Result	W–L	Date	Tournament	Tier	Surface	Partner	Opponents	Score
Loss	0–1	Dec 2012	ITF Kolkata, India	W10	Hard	(India) Rishika Sunkara	(India) Arantxa Andrady (India) Kyra Shroff	4–6, 4–6
Win	1–1	Jul 2013	ITF Valladolid, Spain	W10	Hard	(Italy) Camilla Rosatello	(Spain) Lucía Cervera Vázquez (Spain) Carolina Prats Millán	6–4, 6–0
Win	2–1	Jul 2014	ITF New Delhi, India	W10	Hard	(South Korea) Kim Da-bin	(India) Nidhi Chilumula (South Korea) Han Sung-hee	6–2, 7–6^{(2)}
Win	3–1	Aug 2014	ITF New Delhi, India	W10	Hard	(South Korea) Kim Da-bin	(India) Sharmada Balu (China) Wang Xiyao	6–3, 6–4
Loss	3–2	Jun 2017	ITF Aurangabad, India	W15	Clay	(India) Kanika Vaidya	(India) Pranjala Yadlapalli (China) Zhao Xiaoxi	6–2, 3–6, [4–10]
Win	4–2	Jul 2017	ITF Sharm El Sheikh, Egypt	W15	Hard	(India) Kanika Vaidya	(Germany) Linda Prenkovic (Australia) Jelena Stojanovic	6–2, 6–4
Win	5–2	Jul 2017	ITF Sharm El Sheikh	W15	Hard	(Egypt) Mayar Sherif	(Chinese Taipei) Chen Pei-hsuan (Chinese Taipei) Wu Fang-hsien	3–6, 6–3, [10–5]
Loss	5–3	Sep 2017	ITF Hua Hin, Thailand	W15	Hard	(Australia) Alexandra Walters	(India) Zeel Desai (India) Pranjala Yadlapalli	2–6, 5–7
Win	6–3	Oct 2017	ITF Colombo, Sri Lanka	W15	Hard	(India) Pranjala Yadlapalli	(India) Natasha Palha (India) Rishika Sunkara	6–4, 6–1
Loss	6–4	Apr 2018	ITF Sharm El Sheikh, Egypt	W15	Hard	(India) Kanika Vaidya	(Greece) Eleni Kordolaimi (United Kingdom) Tara Moore	4–6, 1–6
Win	7–4	Jul 2018	ITF Nonthaburi, Thailand	W25	Hard	(India) Pranjala Yadlapalli	(Chinese Taipei) Chen Pei-hsuan (Chinese Taipei) Wu Fang-hsien	7–5, 6–2
Win	8–4	Aug 2018	ITF Nonthaburi, Thailand	W25	Hard	(India) Pranjala Yadlapalli	(Australia) Naiktha Bains (Czech Republic) Barbora Štefková	2–6, 6–0, [10–6]
Win	9–4	Sep 2018	Darwin International, Australia	W60	Hard	(Japan) Hiroko Kuwata	(Australia) Kimberly Birrell (United Kingdom) Katy Dunne	6–2, 6–4
Loss	9–5	Oct 2018	ITF Brisbane, Australia	W25	Hard	(China) Xu Shilin	(Australia) Maddison Inglis (Australia) Kaylah McPhee	5–7, 4–6
Loss	9–6	Mar 2019	Yokohama Challenger, Japan	W25	Hard	(Japan) Akiko Omae	(South Korea) Choi Ji-hee (South Korea) Han Na-lae	1–6, 5–7
Win	10–6	May 2019	ITF Namangan, Uzbekistan	W25	Hard	(Hong Kong) Eudice Chong	(Russia) Anastasia Pribylova (Belarus) Shalimar Talbi	6–4, 6–3
Loss	10–7	May 2019	ITF Singapore, Singapore	W25	Hard	(Papua New Guinea) Abigail Tere-Apisah	(Indonesia) Beatrice Gumulya (Indonesia) Jessy Rompies	4–6, 6–0, [6–10]
Loss	10–8	Sep 2019	Changsha Open, China	W60	Clay	(Japan) Erika Sema	(China) Jiang Xinyu (China) Tang Qianhui	3–6, 6–3, [9–11]
Win	11–8	Oct 2019	Lagos Open, Nigeria	W25	Hard	(Brazil) Laura Pigossi	(Egypt) Sandra Samir (India) Prarthana Thombare	4–6, 6–4, [10–7]
Win	12–8	Oct 2019	Lagos Open, Nigeria	W25	Hard	(Brazil) Laura Pigossi	(Egypt) Sandra Samir (India) Prarthana Thombare	6–3, 6–7^{(3)}, [10–6]
Win	13–8	Nov 2019	ITF Bhopal, India	W25	Hard	(United Kingdom) Emily Webley-Smith	(Latvia) Diāna Marcinkēviča (Ukraine) Valeriya Strakhova	6–4, 7–5
Win	14–8	Feb 2020	ITF Jodhpur, India	W25	Hard	(Japan) Miyabi Inoue	(India) Snehal Mane (India) Ankita Raina	4–6, 6–4, [10–8]
Win	15–8	Mar 2021	Pune Open, India	W25	Hard	(United Kingdom) Emily Webley-Smith	(India) Riya Bhatia (Romania) Miriam Bulgaru	6–2, 7–5
Loss	15–9	Aug 2021	ITF Pärnu, Estonia	W25	Clay	(Belgium) Magali Kempen	(Czech Republic) Anna Sisková (Lithuania) Justina Mikulskytė	7–6^{(5)}, 3–6, [5–10]
Win	16–9	Dec 2021	ITF Bengaluru, India	W15	Hard	(India) Sowjanya Bavisetti	(India) Vaidehi Chaudhari (India) Mihika Yadav	6–0, 6–3
Win	17–9	Mar 2022	Bendigo International, Australia	W25	Hard	(India) Ankita Raina	(Australia) Alexandra Bozovic (Poland) Weronika Falkowska	4–6, 6–3, [10–4]
Win	18–9	Jun 2022	ITF Chiang Rai, Thailand	W25	Hard	(Japan) Erika Sema	(Japan) Haruna Arakawa (Japan) Natsuho Arakawa	6–1, 6–3
Win	19–9	Aug 2022	ITF Roehampton, United Kingdom	W25	Hard	(Japan) Erika Sema	(United Kingdom) Naiktha Bains (United Kingdom) Maia Lumsden	4–6, 6–3, [11–9]
Loss	19–10	Apr 2023	ITF Nottingham, United Kingdom	W25	Hard	(India) Ankita Raina	(United Kingdom) Naiktha Bains (United Kingdom) Maia Lumsden	1–6, 4–6
Loss	19–11	Apr 2023	ITF Nottingham, United Kingdom	W25	Hard	(Netherlands) Arianne Hartono	(United Kingdom) Emily Appleton (United Kingdom) Lauryn John-Baptiste	4–6, 3–6
Win	20–11	Jul 2023	ITF Nakhon Si Thammarat, Thailand	W25	Hard	(Japan) Erika Sema	(India) Shrivalli Bhamidipaty (India) Vaidehi Chaudhari	7–6^{(3)}, 6–1
Win	21–11	Jul 2023	ITF Roehampton, United Kingdom	W25	Hard	(United Kingdom) Sarah Beth Grey	(United Kingdom) Madeleine Brooks (United Kingdom) Holly Hutchinson	0–6, 6–4, [10–4]
Win	22–11	Jul 2023	GB Pro-Series Foxhills, United Kingdom	W25	Hard	(Australia) Destanee Aiava	(Australia) Talia Gibson (Australia) Petra Hule	6–2, 6–3
Loss	22–12	Mar 2024	Kōfu International Open, Japan	W50	Hard	(India) Ankita Raina	(Japan) Saki Imamura (Japan) Erina Hayashi	3–6, 5–7
Win	23–12	Apr 2024	ITF Wuning, China	W50	Hard	(New Zealand) Paige Hourigan	(Chinese Taipei) Cho I-hsuan (Chinese Taipei) Cho Yi-tsen	5–7, 7–6^{(5)}, [12–10]
Win	24–12	May 2024	Fukuoka International, Japan	W75	Carpet	(New Zealand) Paige Hourigan	(Japan) Haruna Arakawa (Japan) Aoi Ito	3–6, 6–3, [10–6]
Win	25–12	Jun 2024	ITF Tauste, Spain	W35	Hard	(China) Tian Fangran	(Australia) Alana Parnaby (Mexico) Victoria Rodríguez	6–2, 6–4
Loss	25–13	Jun 2024	ITF Palma del Río, Spain	W50	Hard	(United States) Sophie Chang	(Poland) Martyna Kubka (Belgium) Lara Salden	2–6, 1–6
Loss	25–14	Sep 2024	Berkeley Club Challenge, United States	W35	Hard	(United States) Ema Burgić	(Australia) Elysia Bolton (United States) Maegan Manasse	7–6^{(3)}, 2–6, [6–10]
Loss	25–15	Jan 2025	ITF Nonthaburi, Thailand	W75	Hard	(Hong Kong) Eudice Chong	(South Korea) Jang Su-jeong (China) Zheng Wushuang	6–4, 0–6, [6–10]
Win	26–15	Apr 2025	ITF Lopota, Georgia	W50	Hard	(New Zealand) Paige Hourigan	(India) Shrivalli Bhamidipaty; Alexandra Shubladze	6–3, 6–2
Loss	25–16	Jun 2025	ITF Tauste, Spain	W35	Hard	(India) Ankita Raina	(Japan) Hiromi Abe (Japan) Kanako Morisaki	3–6, 2–6
Loss	26–17	Jul 2025	ITF Olomouc, Czech Republic	W75	Clay	(China) Zheng Wushuang	(Slovenia) Dalila Jakupović (Slovenia) Nika Radisic	4–6, 1–6
Win	27–17	Aug 2025	ITF Roehampton, United Kingdom	W35	Hard	(United Kingdom) Naiktha Bains	(United States) Mary Lewis (United States) Brandy Walker	4–6, 6–1, [12–10]
Win	28–17	Sep 2025	Le Neubourg Open, France	W75	Hard	(United Kingdom) Naiktha Bains	Polina Iatcenko; Sofya Lansere	6–2, 1–6, [10–6]
Loss	28–18	Oct 2025	ITF Kunshan, China	W35	Hard	(India) Ankita Raina	(China) Li Zongyu (China) Zheng Wushuang	2–6, 2–6
Loss	28–19	Apr 2026	ITF Lopota, Georgia	W75	Hard	(India) Ankita Raina	(Poland) Martyna Kubka (Czech Republic) Vendula Valdmannová	2–6, 3–6
Win	29–19	Jun 2026	ITF Palma del Río, Spain	W50	Hard	(China) Tian Fangran	(Australia) Elena Micic (Australia) Belle Thompson	6–3, 6–4
Loss	29–20	Jun 2026	ITF Elvas, Portugal	W50	Hard	(India) Vaishnavi Adkar	(Australia) Elena Micic (China) Shi Han	4–6, 3–6

== Fed Cup participation ==
=== Singles (15–9) ===
Edition	Round	Date	Location	Against	Surface	Opponent	W/L	Score
2012 Fed Cup	Asia/Oceania Zone II – Pool B	30 January 2012	Shenzhen, China	Iran	Hard	(Iran) Madona Najarian	W	6–0, 6–0
2012 Fed Cup	Asia/Oceania Zone II – Pool B	31 January 2012	Shenzhen, China	Oman	Hard	(Oman) Fatma Al-Nabhani	W	1–6, 7–5, 6–4
2012 Fed Cup	Asia/Oceania Zone II – Pool B	1 February 2012	Shenzhen, China	Turkmenistan	Hard	(Turkmenistan) Ummarahmat Hummetova	W	6–2, 6–0
2012 Fed Cup	Asia/Oceania Zone II – Pool B	3 February 2012	Shenzhen, China	Philippines	Hard	(Philippines) Tamitha Nguyen	W	6–2, 6–3
2012 Fed Cup	Asia/Oceania Zone Group II – Play-offs	4 February 2012	Shenzhen, China	Hong Kong	Hard	(Hong Kong) Chan Wing-yau	L	4–6, 1–6
2013 Fed Cup	Asia/Oceania Zone Group I – Pool A	8 February 2013	Astana, Kazakhstan	Thailand	Hard (i)	(Thailand) Nudnida Luangnam	L	1–6, 6–3, 1–6
2013 Fed Cup	Asia/Oceania Zone Group I – Play-offs	9 February 2013	Astana, Kazakhstan	South Korea	Hard (i)	(South Korea) Lee So-ra	L	6–7^{(5–7)}, 1–6
2020–21 BJK Cup	Asia/Oceania Zone Group I – Pool A	3 March 2020	Dubai, United Arab Emirates	China	Hard	(China) Zhang Shuai	L	4–6, 2–6
2020–21 BJK Cup	Asia/Oceania Zone Group I – Pool A	4 March 2020	Dubai, United Arab Emirates	Uzbekistan	Hard	(Uzbekistan) Akgul Amanmuradova	W	2–6, 6–2, 7–5
2020–21 BJK Cup	Asia/Oceania Zone Group I – Pool A	5 March 2020	Dubai, United Arab Emirates	South Korea	Hard	(South Korea) Jang Su-jeong	W	7–5, 6–4
2020–21 BJK Cup	Asia/Oceania Zone Group I – Pool A	6 March 2020	Dubai, United Arab Emirates	Chinese Taipei	Hard	(Chinese Taipei) Yang Ya-yi	W	3–6, 6–3, 7–6^{(8–6)}
2020–21 BJK Cup	Asia/Oceania Zone Group I – Pool A	7 March 2020	Dubai, United Arab Emirates	Indonesia	Hard	(Indonesia) Priska Madelyn Nugroho	L	3–6, 6–0, 3–6

=== Doubles (3–4) ===
Edition	Round	Date	Location	Against	Surface	Partner	Opponents	W/L	Score
2012 Fed Cup	Asia/Oceania Zone II – Pool B	30 January 2012	Shenzhen, China	Oman	Hard	(India) Isha Lakhani	(Oman) Madona Najarian (Oman) Ghazaleh Torkaman	W	6–1, 6–0
2013 Fed Cup	Asia/Oceania Zone Group I – Pool A	6 February 2013	Astana, Kazakhstan	Kazakhstan	Hard (i)	(India) Ankita Raina	(Kazakhstan) Sesil Karatantcheva (Kazakhstan) Galina Voskoboeva	L	3–6, 1–6
