= 2019 Fed Cup Asia/Oceania Zone Group I – Pool A =

Subsection of tennis competition

Pool A of the 2019 Fed Cup Asia/Oceania Zone Group I was one of two pools in the Asia/Oceania zone of the 2019 Fed Cup. Three teams competed in a round robin competition, with the top team and the bottom team proceeding to their respective sections of the play-offs: the top team played for advancement to the World Group II Play-offs, while the bottom team faced potential relegation to Group II.

== Standings ==
		KAZ	IND	THA	RR; W–L	Set; W–L	Game; W–L	Standings
1	Kazakhstan		3–0	3–0	2–0	12–0 (100%)	73–29 (72%)	1
4	India	0–3		2–1	1–1	5–10 (33%)	62–81 (43%)	2
5	Thailand	0–3	1–2		0–2	4–11 (27%)	59–84 (41%)	3

Standings are determined by: 1. number of wins; 2. number of matches; 3. in two-team ties, head-to-head records; 4. in three-team ties, (a) percentage of sets won (head-to-head records if two teams remain tied), then (b) percentage of games won (head-to-head records if two teams remain tied), then (c) Fed Cup rankings.

== Round-robin ==
=== Kazakhstan vs. Thailand ===
Kazakhstan
3
Daulet National Tennis Centre, Astana, Kazakhstan
6 February
Hard (indoor)

Thailand
0

			1	2	3
1	(Kazakhstan) (Thailand)	Zarina Diyas; Mananchaya Sawangkaew	6; 1	6; 3
2	(Kazakhstan) (Thailand)	Yulia Putintseva; Nudnida Luangnam	6; 2	6; 3
3	(Kazakhstan) (Thailand)	Anna Danilina / Galina Voskoboeva; Peangtarn Plipuech / Varunya Wongteanchai	6; 3	6; 3

=== India vs. Thailand ===
India
2
Daulet National Tennis Centre, Astana, Kazakhstan
7 February
Hard (indoor)

Thailand
1

			1	2	3
1	(India) (Thailand)	Karman Thandi; Nudnida Luangnam	2; 6	6; 3	3; 6
2	(India) (Thailand)	Ankita Raina; Peangtarn Plipuech	6^{3} 7^{7}	6; 2	6; 4
3	(India) (Thailand)	Ankita Raina / Karman Thandi; Nudnida Luangnam / Peangtarn Plipuech	6; 4	6^{6} 7^{8}	7; 5

=== Kazakhstan vs. India ===
Kazakhstan
3
Daulet National Tennis Centre, Astana, Kazakhstan
8 February
Hard (indoor)

India
0

			1	2	3
1	(Kazakhstan) (India)	Zarina Diyas; Karman Thandi	6; 3	6; 2
2	(Kazakhstan) (India)	Yulia Putintseva; Ankita Raina	6; 1	7^{7} 6^{4}
3	(Kazakhstan) (India)	Anna Danilina / Galina Voskoboeva; Riya Bhatia / Prarthana Thombare	6; 1	6; 1
