= 2019 Fed Cup Asia/Oceania Zone Group II – Pool A (Kuala Lumpur) =

Subsection of tennis competition

Pool A (Kuala Lumpur) of the 2019 Fed Cup Asia/Oceania Zone Group II was one of four pools in the Asia/Oceania zone of the 2019 Fed Cup. Three teams competed in a round robin competition, with the top team and the bottom team proceeding to their respective sections of the play-offs: the top team played for advancement to Group I.

== Standings ==
		UZB	MAS	TKM	RR; W–L	Set; W–L	Game; W–L	Standings
1	Uzbekistan		3–0	3–0	2–0	12–0 (100%)	72–20 (78%)	1
5	Malaysia	0–3		3–0	1–1	6–6 (50%)	50–44 (53%)	2
12	Turkmenistan	0–3	0–3		0–2	0–12 (0%)	14–72 (16%)	3

Standings are determined by: 1. number of wins; 2. number of matches; 3. in two-team ties, head-to-head records; 4. in three-team ties, (a) percentage of sets won (head-to-head records if two teams remain tied), then (b) percentage of games won (head-to-head records if two teams remain tied), then (c) Fed Cup rankings.

== Round-robin ==
=== Uzbekistan vs. Turkmenistan ===
Uzbekistan
3
National Tennis Centre, Kuala Lumpur, Malaysia
19 June
Hard

Turkmenistan
0

			1	2	3
1	(Uzbekistan) (Turkmenistan)	Milana Maslenkova; Guljan Muhammetkuliyeva	6; 1	6; 3
2	(Uzbekistan) (Turkmenistan)	Sabina Sharipova; Anastasiya Azimbayeva	6; 0	6; 0
3	(Uzbekistan) (Turkmenistan)	Milana Maslenkova / Sevil Yuldasheva; Arzuv Klycheva / Bahar Toymyradova	6; 2	6; 0

=== Malaysia vs. Turkmenistan ===
Malaysia
3
National Tennis Centre, Kuala Lumpur, Malaysia
20 June
Hard

Turkmenistan
0

			1	2	3
1	(Malaysia) (Turkmenistan)	Sara Nayar; Guljan Muhammetkuliyeva	6; 2	6; 1
2	(Malaysia) (Turkmenistan)	Sharifah Elysia Wan Abdul Rahman; Anastasiya Azimbayeva	6; 1	6; 2
3	(Malaysia) (Turkmenistan)	Suhana Sofia Mohd Adam Das / Jawairiah Noordin; Rozhan Karajayeva / Arzuv Klycheva	6; 1	6; 1

=== Uzbekistan vs. Malaysia ===
Uzbekistan
3
National Tennis Centre, Kuala Lumpur, Malaysia
21 June
Hard

Malaysia
0

			1	2	3
1	(Uzbekistan) (Malaysia)	Nigina Abduraimova; Sara Nayar	6; 3	6; 4
2	(Uzbekistan) (Malaysia)	Sabina Sharipova; Suhana Sofia Mohd Adam Das	6; 2	6; 0
3	(Uzbekistan) (Malaysia)	Nigina Abduraimova / Akgul Amanmuradova; Jawairiah Noordin / Sharifah Elsa Wan Abdul Rahman	6; 4	6; 1
