= 2019 Fed Cup Asia/Oceania Zone Group II – Pool A (Dushanbe) =

Subsection of tennis competition

Pool A (Dushanbe) of the 2019 Fed Cup Asia/Oceania Zone Group II was one of four pools in the Asia/Oceania zone of the 2019 Fed Cup. Three teams competed in a round robin competition, with the top team and the bottom team proceeding to their respective sections of the play-offs: the top team played for advancement to Group I.

== Standings ==
		TPE	PHI	TJK	RR; W–L	Set; W–L	Game; W–L	Standings
2	Chinese Taipei		3–0	3–0	2–0	12–0 (100%)	74–21 (78%)	1
8	Philippines	0–3		3–0	1–1	6–6 (50%)	54–47 (53%)	2
10	Tajikistan	0–3	0–3		0–2	0–12 (0%)	13–73 (15%)	3

Standings are determined by: 1. number of wins; 2. number of matches; 3. in two-team ties, head-to-head records; 4. in three-team ties, (a) percentage of sets won (head-to-head records if two teams remain tied), then (b) percentage of games won (head-to-head records if two teams remain tied), then (c) Fed Cup rankings.

== Round-robin ==
=== Philippines vs. Tajikistan ===
Philippines
3
Pamir Stadium, Dushanbe, Tajikistan
12 June
Hard

Tajikistan
0

			1	2	3
1	(Philippines) (Tajikistan)	Katharina Lehnert; Nargizakhon Yakhyaeva	6; 2	6; 0
2	(Philippines) (Tajikistan)	Marian Capadocia; Anastasiya Tursunova	7; 5	6; 2
3	(Philippines) (Tajikistan)	Khim Iglupas / Katharina Lehnert; Ramina Mulloeva / Tamanno Sharipova	6; 0	6; 0

=== Chinese Taipei vs. Tajikistan ===
Chinese Taipei
3
Pamir Stadium, Dushanbe, Tajikistan
13 June
Hard

Tajikistan
0

			1	2	3
1	(Chinese Taipei) (Tajikistan)	Hsu Chieh-yu; Diana Ivanikhina	6; 0	6; 0
2	(Chinese Taipei) (Tajikistan)	Lee Ya-hsuan; Anastasiya Tursunova	6; 0	6; 2
3	(Chinese Taipei) (Tajikistan)	Chan Hao-ching / Latisha Chan; Diana Ivanikhina / Tamanno Sharipova	6; 1	6; 1

=== Chinese Taipei vs. Philippines ===
Chinese Taipei
3
Pamir Stadium, Dushanbe, Tajikistan
14 June
Hard

Philippines
0

			1	2	3
1	(Chinese Taipei) (Philippines)	Hsu Chieh-yu; Katharina Lehnert	6; 1	6; 2
2	(Chinese Taipei) (Philippines)	Liang En-shuo; Marian Capadocia	7^{7} 6^{5}	7; 5
3	(Chinese Taipei) (Philippines)	Chan Hao-ching / Latisha Chan; Khim Iglupas / Katharina Lehnert	6; 3	6; 0
