= Ankita Raina =

Indian tennis player (born 1993)

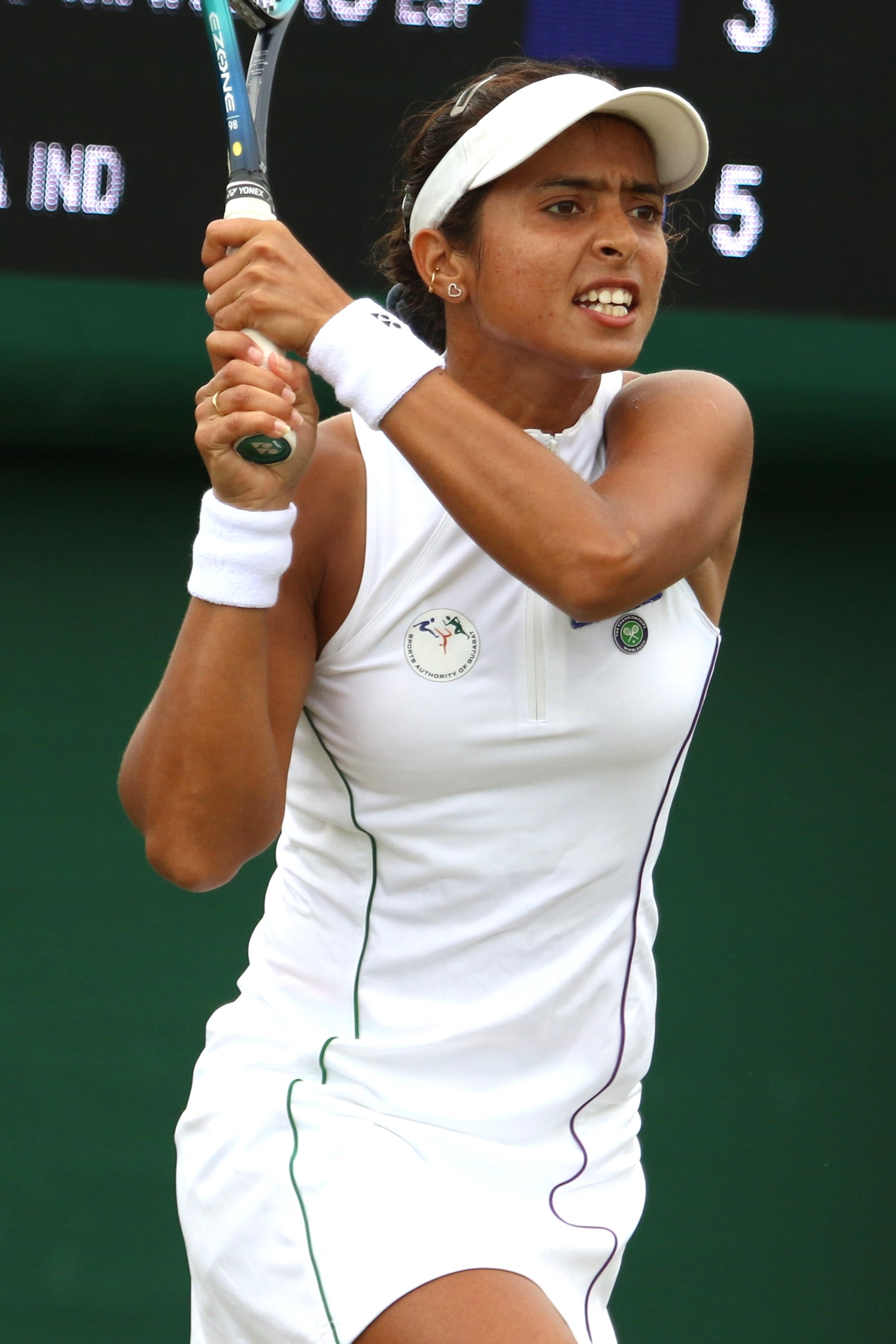
- Raina at the 2023 Wimbledon Championships
- Full name: Ankita Ravinderkrishan Raina
- Country (sports): India
- Born: 11 January 1993 (age 33) Ahmedabad, Gujarat, India
- Height: 1.63 m (5 ft 4 in)
- Turned pro: 2009
- Plays: Right (two-handed backhand)
- Prize money: US$ 864,608

Singles
- Career record: 420–382
- Career titles: 11 ITF
- Highest ranking: No. 160 (2 March 2020)
- Current ranking: No. 596 (19 October 2026)

Grand Slam singles results
- Australian Open: Q3 (2021)
- French Open: Q2 (2020, 2021, 2023)
- Wimbledon: Q2 (2018, 2019)
- US Open: Q3 (2023)

Doubles
- Career record: 374–303
- Career titles: 1 WTA, 1 WTA Challenger
- Highest ranking: No. 93 (17 May 2021)
- Current ranking: No. 160 (19 October 2026)

Grand Slam doubles results
- Australian Open: 1R (2021)
- French Open: 1R (2021)
- Wimbledon: 1R (2021)
- US Open: 1R (2021)

Other doubles tournaments
- Olympic Games: 1R (2020)

Grand Slam mixed doubles results
- Wimbledon: 1R (2021)

Team competitions
- Fed Cup: 38–35
Medal record
Women's tennis
Representing India
Asian Games
Bronze medal – third place	2018 Palembang	Women's singles
Asian Indoor Games
Silver medal – second place	2017 Ashgabat	Women's doubles
South Asian Games
Gold medal – first place	2016 Guwahati	Women's singles
Gold medal – first place	2016 Guwahati	Mixed doubles
- Last updated on: 24 October 2026.

Ankita Raina (born 11 January 1993) is an Indian tennis player. Since 2018, she has regularly been India's number one female player in singles and doubles.

Raina has won one title on the WTA Tour and one WTA 125 title (both in doubles), along with 11 singles and 33 doubles titles on the ITF Circuit. In April 2018, she entered the top 200 in the singles rankings for the first time, becoming only the fifth player representing India to achieve this feat. Raina has also won gold medals in the women's singles and mixed-doubles events at the 2016 South Asian Games, and a bronze medal in singles at the 2018 Asian Games. Raina is one of only two women representing India who have won a WTA Tour-level title.

Playing for India Billie Jean King Cup team, Raina has a win–loss record of 38–35 (as of October 2026). She has notable wins over 2011 US Open champion Samantha Stosur, Wimbledon finalist Sabine Lisicki, former world No. 5 Sara Errani, and multiple doubles Grand Slam champion Barbora Strýcová.

== Personal life ==
Raina was born in the Indian state of Gujarat to Lalita Raina and Ravinder Kishen Raina. She was born and brought up in Ahmedabad before moving to Pune, Maharashtra at the age of 14 as Pune had a better infrastructure and opportunities to develop professional tennis players; the decision was made based on her performance at the Asians 14 and under masters tournament in Melbourne, where she placed second.

At the national events, Raina has represented her home state Gujarat. Her idols growing up were Roger Federer, Rafael Nadal, Serena Williams, and Sania Mirza.

Raina trains at the Hemant Bendrey Tennis Academy at the PYC Hindu Gymkhana in Pune.

== Career ==
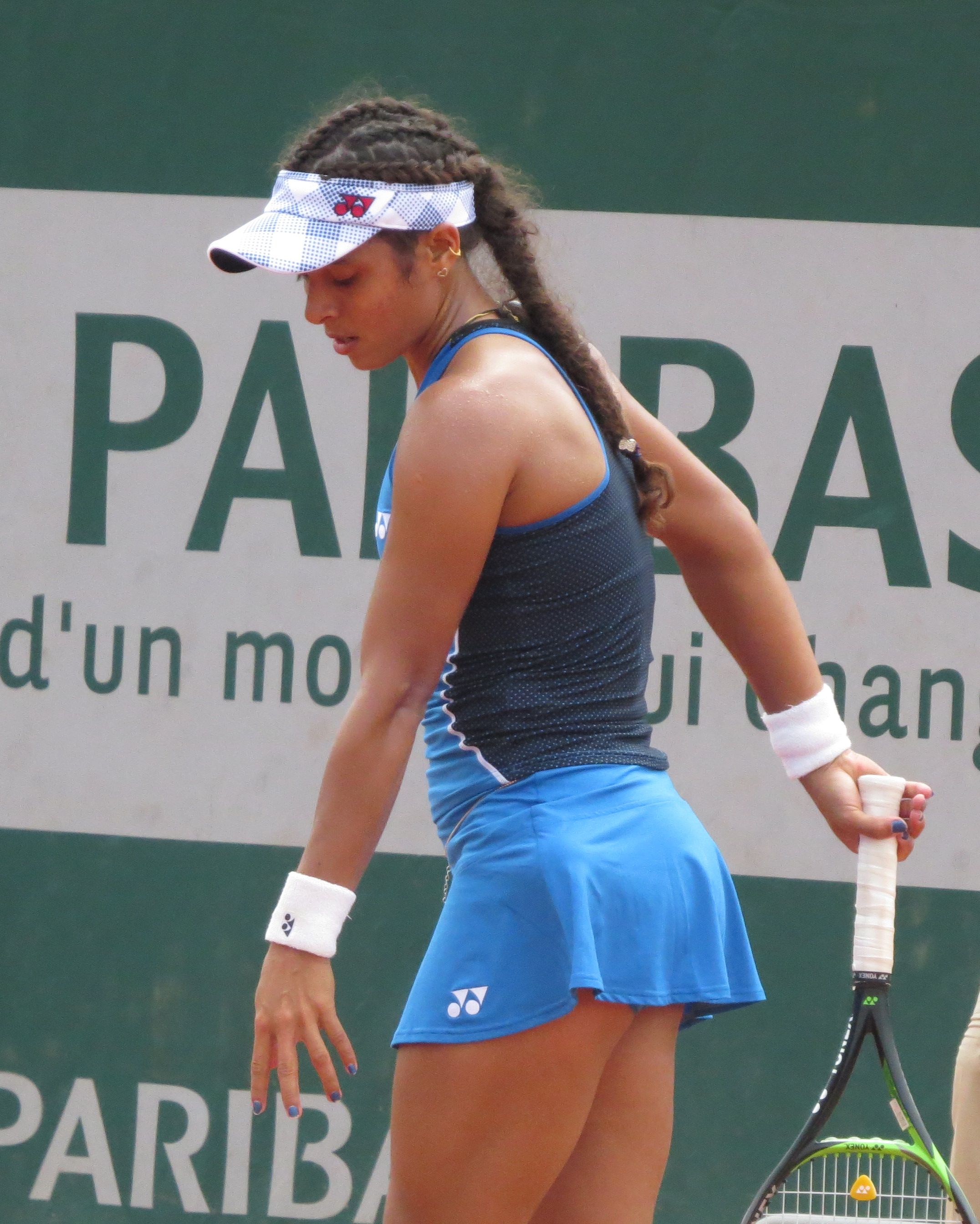
Raina playing in the qualifying at the 2018 French Open – her first Grand Slam tournament

=== 2008–16: Junior years ===
Raina started playing tennis at the age of five. From a young age she has been coached by Hemant Bendrey, who recognized her strong discipline and mentality. Following a promising junior career, Raina made her first professional appearance in 2009, at a small ITF tournament in Mumbai. In 2010, she continued to participate in local ITF events with limited success. Raina's 2011 season saw her advance to three ITF Circuit finals in doubles, winning one with countrywoman Aishwarya Agrawal. In 2012, she won her first professional singles title in New Delhi and won three more in doubles. This was followed by a few years of mediocre results on the ITF Women's Circuit.

=== 2017–19: Breakthrough ===
Raina won two matches at the Mumbai Open, advancing to the quarterfinal. This would turn out to be her breakthrough tournament. In April 2018, she reached a ranking of world No. 181, after winning a $25k title, becoming the fifth Indian national to crack to the top-200 women's singles rankings, following Nirupama Sanjeev, Sania Mirza, Shikha Uberoi, and Sunitha Rao.

In August 2018, Ankita won the bronze medal in the Asian Games at Jakarta, Indonesia in singles event. Raina and Sania Mirza are the only players representing India to have won a singles medal at the Asian Games. Later that year, she won the biggest doubles title of her career at the Taipei Challenger, partnering with compatriot Karman Kaur Thandi.

Following a loss at the Australian Open, Raina won a $25k title in Singapore, with a solid win over Arantxa Rus in the final. At the Kunming Open, she got her first top-100 win, defeating Samantha Stosur, former US Open champion and top-10 player, scoring the biggest win of her career. At the French Open, Raina lost her first qualifying match to well-known American youngster Coco Gauff in two tight sets, despite playing well. She went on to reach the second qualifying rounds of both the Wimbledon Championships and the US Open, losing tight three-setters in both tournaments. In October 2019, Raina entered the top 150 doubles rankings for the first time, after reaching the finals of the Suzhou Ladies Open with partner Rosalie van der Hoek. She is now coached by Arjun Kadhe, who is also her trainer and hitting partner.

=== 2020–21: Major main-draw and Olympics debut ===
Raina had a disappointing result at the Australian Open, albeit she was unwell due to the Australian bushfires. However, Raina found further doubles success by winning two back-to-back ITF titles in Nonthaburi alongside Bibiane Schoofs; followed by reaching her first WTA Tour semifinal at the Thailand Open alongside Rosalie. This gave Raina a new career-high ranking of No. 119 in doubles. She also won two singles titles early on in 2020, one in Nonthaburi, and the other in Jodhpur, India. Raina then helped India advance to the Fed Cup World Group 2 playoffs for the first time in history in April 2020 in Dubai, along with Sania Mirza, Rutuja Bhosale, Riya Bhatia and Sowjanya Bavisetti. In the Fed Cup, Raina had put up a good fight and won the first set 6–1 against China's top player Wang Qiang, but lost the match in three tight sets.

Raina returned to competition at the resumption of the tour in September after a long hiatus due to the ongoing COVID-19 pandemic; she suffered early exits in ITF tournaments she played in after the break. She then competed at the 2020 French Open qualifying where she advanced to the second round for the first time but lost to Kurumi Nara. In December, Raina won the biggest ITF doubles title of her career at Dubai, alongside Ekaterine Gorgodze, and reached a new career-high doubles ranking of 117.

Raina competed in all the Grand Slam championships and the Olympics in 2021 but had first-round exits in all in doubles category. She competed mixed doubles only in Wimbledon but that too was a first-round exit. Raina began 2021 at the Australian Open, where she had her best performance at a major, losing in the third and final qualifying round to Olga Danilović. She then became the fourth player representing India to feature in the main draw of a Grand Slam championship (after Nirupama Mankad, Nirupama Sanjeev, and Sania Mirza), playing doubles alongside Mihaela Buzărnescu, losing in the first round.

Raina won the first WTA Tour singles main-draw match of her career at the Phillip Island Trophy. She came from a break down in the third set to reel off the last six games for a 5–7, 6–1, 6–2 win over Elisabetta Cocciaretto. She then lost to Kimberly Birrell. In doubles, Raina partnered with Kamilla Rakhimova to advance to her first WTA Tour level final, where they defeated the Russian pairing of Anastasia Potapova and Anna Blinkova. With this victory, Ankita became the second Indian female after Sania Mirza to win a WTA title, and also the third Indian woman after Mirza and Shikha Uberoi to break into the top 100 of the WTA rankings, debuting at world No. 94 in doubles.

Her improved ranking allowed her to compete more regularly on the WTA Tour, albeit with limited success. At the Abierto Zapopan, Raina scored a victory over former world No. 5 and French Open finalist, Sara Errani, before losing to Leonie Küng. At the French Open, she lost in the second qualifying round in singles, and the first round of the main draw in doubles. Raina enjoyed a strong grass-court season in doubles, reaching back to back semifinals at the Nottingham Open and Nottingham Trophy. At Wimbledon, she competed in all three events, losing in the first qualifying round of singles to Varvara Lepchenko and the first round of doubles and mixed doubles, partnering Lauren Davis and Ramkumar Ramanathan, respectively.

Sania Mirza's protected ranking of No. 9 meant that Raina and Mirza gained direct entry into the Tokyo Olympics in women's doubles. They lost in three sets in the first round to the Kichenok sisters, in spite of leading 6–0, 5–2.

Raina competed at the 2021 US Open, losing in the first round of singles qualifying to Jamie Loeb and the first round of doubles. This meant she had played in the main draw of doubles at all four major tournaments. She then won only one of her next seven matches in singles, to end the year outside the top 200. She also lost seven out of her eight doubles matches during this stretch.

For her achievements at the Asian Games and South Asian Games, Raina was conferred the Arjuna Award in 2021.

=== 2022–2023 ===
Raina carried her poor form from the end of 2021 into 2022, with her losing in the first qualifying round of the Australian Open, and then, at an ITF tournament in Kazakhstan. As a result, she dropped out of the top 350 and returned to playing on the ITF Circuit. In the second half of the season, she won 18 of her last 27 matches to end the year. Her lone final of the season came in August, at an ITF event at Aldershot, losing to Chinese Taipei player Joanna Garland.

However, she was much more successful in doubles, reaching nine ITF Circuit finals, winning five of them.

Raina reached the semifinals of a $40k tournament in India in January, and the final in Bangalore in March. She reached her second final of the season at the Jakarta $25k tournament, but lost again. These results propelled her close to the top 200, and she returned to a major qualifying at the French Open, where she lost in the second round. She also competed in the first qualifying round at Wimbledon but lost again. Raina qualified for the main draw of the WTA 250 Poland Open, but lost to Jodie Burrage in a tight three-setter. She entered the WTA Prague Open the following week as lucky loser, and scored her first WTA Tour main-draw win of the season over former world No. 16, Barbora Strýcová.

At the 2023 US Open, Raina reached the final round of qualifying, but lost in straight sets to Mirjam Björklund. This was the second time Raina reached the final round of qualifying.

== Playing style ==
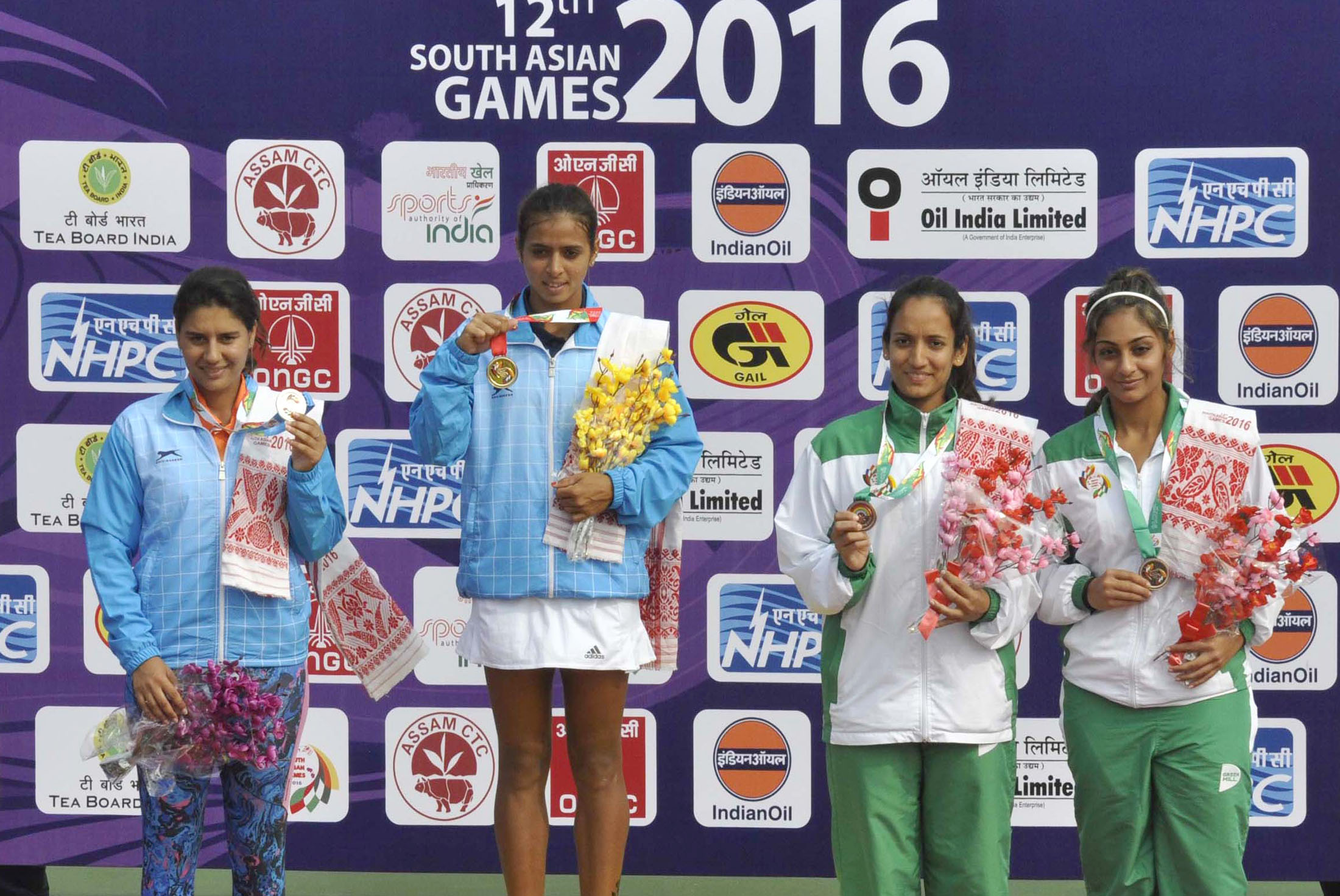
Raina won the gold medal in singles at the 2016 South Asian Games.

Raina is a steady baseliner who primarily relies on her speed and counterpunching abilities to outlast her opponents. Her preferred surfaces are grass and hard court, as they are more suited to her game style.

== Sponsorship and equipment ==
In her junior years, Raina was helped by Dishman Pharmaceuticals and Chemicals to participate in overseas junior tournaments. Since then, she has been supported by Bharat Forge and Lakshya. Most recently, Raina has signed sponsorship deals with the Sports Authority of Gujarat and Yonex, and she is officially employed with ONGC. Hence, Raina uses Yonex racquets and clothing. Adani Group is her current supporter.

In 2013, Raina met Narendra Modi, India's then-future prime minister, and officially was recognised under the Shaktidhoot scheme and hence became a part of India's goal of reaching Olympic podiums.

== Performance timeline ==
Key
W	F	SF	QF	#R	RR	Q#	P#	DNQ	A	Z#	PO	G	S	B	NMS	NTI	P	NH

(W) winner; (F) finalist; (SF) semifinalist; (QF) quarterfinalist; (#R) rounds 4, 3, 2, 1; (RR) round-robin stage; (Q#) qualification round; (P#) preliminary round; (DNQ) did not qualify; (A) absent; (Z#) Davis/Fed Cup Zonal Group (with number indication) or (PO) play-off; (G) gold, (S) silver or (B) bronze Olympic/Paralympic medal; (NMS) not a Masters tournament; (NTI) not a Tier I tournament; (P) postponed; (NH) not held; (SR) strike rate (events won / competed); (W–L) win–loss record.
To avoid confusion and double counting, these charts are updated at the conclusion of a tournament or when the player's participation has ended.

=== Doubles ===
Tournament	2021	2022	2023	W–L
Australian Open	1R	A	A	0–1
French Open	1R	A	A	0–1
Wimbledon	1R	A	A	0–1
US Open	1R	A	A	0–1
Win–Loss	0–4	0–0	0–0	0–4

== WTA Tour finals ==
=== Doubles: 1 (title) ===
Legend WTA 250 (1–0)	Finals by surface Hard (1–0)

Result	Date	Tournament	Tier	Surface	Partner	Opponents	Score
Win	Feb 2021	Phillip Island Trophy, Australia	WTA 250	Hard	(Russia) Kamilla Rakhimova	(Russia) Anna Blinkova (Russia) Anastasia Potapova	2–6, 6–4, [10–7]

== WTA 125 finals ==
=== Doubles: 1 (title) ===
Result	Date	Tournament	Surface	Partner	Opponents	Score
Win	Nov 2018	Taipei Open, Taiwan	Carpet (i)	(India) Karman Thandi	(Russia) Olga Doroshina (Russia) Natela Dzalamidze	6–3, 5–7, [12–12] ret.

== ITF Circuit finals ==
=== Singles: 25 (11 titles, 14 runner-ups) ===
Legend $60,000 tournaments (0–2) $40,000 tournaments (0–1) $25,000 tournaments (7–6) $10,000 tournaments (4–5)	Finals by surface Hard (10–12) Clay (1–1) Grass (0–1)

Result	W–L	Date	Tournament	Tier	Surface	Opponent	Score
Loss	0–1	Apr 2012	ITF Fujairah, U.A.E.	10,000	Hard	(Oman) Fatma Al-Nabhani	3–6, 2–6
Win	1–1	Jun 2012	ITF New Delhi, India	10,000	Hard	(India) Prerna Bhambri	6–4, 6–2
Loss	1–2	Jul 2012	ITF New Delhi, India	10,000	Hard	(Japan) Miyabi Inoue	2–6, 2–6
Loss	1–3	Mar 2013	ITF Hyderabad, India	10,000	Hard	(Portugal) Bárbara Luz	6–4, 6–7^{(5)}, 6–7^{(3)}
Loss	1–4	Mar 2013	ITF Hyderabad, India	10,000	Hard	(Portugal) Bárbara Luz	6–2, 3–6, 1–6
Win	2–4	Apr 2013	ITF Chennai, India	10,000	Clay	(India) Natasha Palha	6–3, 6–1
Loss	2–5	Apr 2013	ITF Lucknow, India	10,000	Grass	(Japan) Emi Mutaguchi	6–3, 6–7^{(2)}, 1–6
Loss	2–6	Jun 2013	ITF Qarshi, Uzbekistan	25,000	Hard	(Uzbekistan) Sabina Sharipova	3–6, 3–6
Win	3–6	Jun 2013	ITF New Delhi, India	10,000	Hard	(India) Eetee Maheta	6–3, 6–2
Win	4–6	Jul 2013	ITF New Delhi, India	10,000	Hard	(India) Kanika Vaidya	6–4, 6–4
Loss	4–7	May 2014	ITF Balikpapan, Indonesia	25,000	Clay	(China) Zhu Lin	5–7, 6–2, 3–6
Win	5–7	Dec 2014	Pune Championships, India	25,000	Hard	(United Kingdom) Katy Dunne	6–2, 6–2
Loss	5–8	Apr 2015	ITF Ahmedabad, India	25,000	Hard	(Latvia) Anastasija Sevastova	4–6, 6–7^{(5)}
Loss	5–9	May 2017	Jin'an Open, China	60,000	Hard	(China) Zhu Lin	3–6, 6–3, 4–6
Win	6–9	Mar 2018	ITF Gwalior, India	25,000	Hard	(France) Amandine Hesse	6–2, 7–5
Win	7–9	Jul 2018	ITF Nonthaburi, Thailand	25,000	Hard	(Japan) Risa Ozaki	6–2, 6–3
Win	8–9	Jan 2019	ITF Singapore	W25	Hard	(Netherlands) Arantxa Rus	6–3, 6–2
Loss	8–10	Apr 2019	Lale Cup Istanbul, Turkey	W60	Hard	(Russia) Vitalia Diatchenko	4–6, 0–6
Win	9–10	Dec 2019	ITF Solapur, India	W25	Hard	(United Kingdom) Naiktha Bains	6–3, 6–3
Win	10–10	Jan 2020	ITF Nonthaburi, Thailand	W25	Hard	(France) Chloé Paquet	6–3, 7–5
Win	11–10	Feb 2020	ITF Jodhpur, India	W25	Hard	(Turkey) Berfu Cengiz	7–5, 6–1
Loss	11–11	Aug 2022	ITF Aldershot, United Kingdom	W25	Hard	(Chinese Taipei) Joanna Garland	2–6, 4–6
Loss	11–12	Mar 2023	ITF Bangalore, India	W40	Hard	(Czech Republic) Brenda Fruhvirtová	6–0, 4–6, 0–6
Loss	11–13	Apr 2023	ITF Jakarta, Indonesia	W25	Hard	(China) Bai Zhuoxuan	6–3, 0–6, 2–6
Loss	11–14	Mar 2026	ITF Kalaburagi, India	W35	Hard	(India) Vaishnavi Adkar	6–7^{(3)}, 4–6

=== Doubles: 64 (33 titles, 31 runner-ups) ===
Legend W100 tournaments (1–5) W60/75 tournaments (6–4) W40/50 tournaments (5–5) W25/35 tournaments (15–13) W10/15 tournaments (6–4)	Finals by surface Hard (28–25) Clay (4–5) Grass (1–1)

Result	W–L	Date	Tournament	Tier	Surface	Partner	Opponents	Score
Loss	0–1	Jan 2011	ITF Kolkata, India	10,000	Clay	(India) Poojashree Venkatesha	(Italy) Nicole Clerico (Slovenia) Dalila Jakupovič	3–6, 1–6
Loss	0–2	Apr 2011	ITF Lucknow, India	10,000	Grass	(India) Aishwarya Agrawal	(Slovenia) Anja Prislan (India) Kyra Shroff	3–6, 3–6
Win	1–2	May 2011	ITF New Delhi, India	10,000	Hard	(India) Aishwarya Agrawal	(Oman) Fatma Al-Nabhani (India) Rushmi Chakravarthi	6–4, 6–3
Win	2–2	May 2012	ITF New Delhi, India	10,000	Hard	(India) Rushmi Chakravarthi	(China) Liu Yuxuan (China) Zhao Qianqian	6–1, 6–4
Win	3–2	May 2012	ITF New Delhi, India	10,000	Hard	(India) Rushmi Chakravarthi	(India) Sri Peddy Reddy (India) Prarthana Thombare	6–3, 6–2
Win	4–2	Jun 2012	ITF New Delhi, India	10,000	Hard	(India) Aishwarya Agrawal	(Israel) Ester Masuri (Hungary) Naomi Totka	6–1, 6–4
Loss	4–3	Apr 2013	ITF Chennai, India	10,000	Clay	(India) Rushmi Chakravarthi	(India) Natasha Palha (India) Prarthana Thombare	7–5, 3–6, [6–10]
Loss	4–4	Jul 2013	ITF New Delhi, India	10,000	Hard	(India) Shweta Rana	(India) Sharmada Balu (India) Sowjanya Bavisetti	2–6, 4–6
Win	5–4	Jan 2014	ITF Aurangabad, India	10,000	Clay	(India) Prarthana Thombare	(India) Shweta Rana (India) Rishika Sunkara	6–3, 6–3
Loss	5–5	May 2014	ITF Tianjin, China	25,000	Hard	(Oman) Fatma Al-Nabhani	(China) Liu Chang (China) Ran Tian	1–6, 5–7
Win	6–5	Nov 2014	ITF Mumbai, India	25,000	Hard	(China) Lu Jiajing	(Thailand) Nicha Lertpitaksinchai (Thailand) Peangtarn Plipuech	6–4, 1–6, [11–9]
Win	7–5	Dec 2014	ITF Lucknow, India	15,000	Grass	(United Kingdom) Emily Webley-Smith	(India) Rushmi Chakravarthi (India) Nidhi Chilumula	6–2, 6–4
Loss	7–6	Aug 2015	ITF Westende, Belgium	25,000	Hard	(Ukraine) Alyona Sotnikova	(Netherlands) Indy de Vroome (Netherlands) Lesley Kerkhove	6–7^{(4)}, 4–6
Loss	7–7	Jun 2016	Fergana Challenger, Uzbekistan	25,000	Hard	(India) Prerna Bhambri	(Russia) Polina Monova (Russia) Yana Sizikova	6–7^{(0)}, 2–6
Win	8–7	Sep 2016	Zhuhai Open, China	50,000	Hard	(United Kingdom) Emily Webley-Smith	(China) Guo Hanyu (China) Jiang Xinyu	6–4, 6–4
Win	9–7	Apr 2017	ITF Pula, Italy	25,000	Clay	(Netherlands) Eva Wacanno	(Spain) Irene Burillo (Spain) Yvonne Cavallé Reimers	6–4, 6–4
Win	10–7	May 2017	ITF Hua Hin, Thailand	25,000	Hard	(United Kingdom) Emily Webley-Smith	(Thailand) Nudnida Luangnam (China) Zhang Yukun	6–2, 6–0
Win	11–7	Aug 2017	ITF Koksijde, Belgium	25,000	Clay	(Netherlands) Bibiane Schoofs	(Belgium) Marie Benoît (Belgium) Magali Kempen	3–6, 6–3, [11–9]
Loss	11–8	Aug 2017	ITF Leipzig, Germany	25,000	Clay	(Croatia) Tereza Mrdeža	(Russia) Valentyna Ivakhnenko (Belarus) Lidziya Marozava	2–6, 1–6
Win	12–8	Aug 2017	Mençuna Cup, Turkey	60,000	Hard	(Brazil) Gabriela Cé	(Bulgaria) Elitsa Kostova (Russia) Yana Sizikova	6–2, 6–3
Win	13–8	May 2018	Jin'an Open, China	60,000	Hard	(United Kingdom) Harriet Dart	(China) Liu Fangzhou (China) Xun Fangying	6–3, 6–3
Win	14–8	Nov 2018	ITF Pune, India	25,000	Hard	(India) Karman Thandi	(Bulgaria) Aleksandrina Naydenova (Slovenia) Tamara Zidanšek	6–2, 6–7^{(5)}, [11–9]
Loss	14–9	Jul 2019	Versmold Open, Germany	W60	Clay	(Netherlands) Bibiane Schoofs	(Russia) Amina Anshba (Czech Republic) Anastasia Dețiuc	6–0, 3–6, [8–10]
Loss	14–10	Aug 2019	GB Pro-Series Foxhills, UK	W25	Hard	(United Kingdom) Naiktha Bains	(United Kingdom) Sarah Beth Grey (United Kingdom) Eden Silva	2–6, 5–7
Loss	14–11	Oct 2019	Suzhou Ladies Open, China	W100	Hard	(Netherlands) Rosalie van der Hoek	(China) Jiang Xinyu (China) Tang Qianhui	6–3, 3–6, [5–10]
Loss	14–12	Nov 2019	Liuzhou Open, China	W60	Hard	(Netherlands) Rosalie van der Hoek	(China) Jiang Xinyu (China) Tang Qianhui	4–6, 4–6
Win	15–12	Dec 2019	ITF Solapur, India	W25	Hard	(Norway) Ulrikke Eikeri	(Turkey) Berfu Cengiz (Greece) Despina Papamichail	5–7, 6–4, [10–3]
Win	16–12	Jan 2020	ITF Nonthaburi, Thailand	W25	Hard	(Netherlands) Bibiane Schoofs	(Thailand) Supapitch Kuearum (Thailand) Mananchaya Sawangkaew	6–4, 6–2
Win	17–12	Jan 2020	ITF Nonthaburi, Thailand	W25	Hard	(Netherlands) Bibiane Schoofs	(Japan) Miyabi Inoue (China) Kang Jiaqi	6–2, 3–6, [10–7]
Loss	17–13	Feb 2020	ITF Jodhpur, India	W25	Hard	(India) Snehal Mane	(India) Rutuja Bhosale (Japan) Miyabi Inoue	6–4, 4–6, [8–10]
Win	18–13	Dec 2020	Dubai Tennis Challenge, UAE	W100	Hard	(Georgia (country)) Ekaterine Gorgodze	(Spain) Aliona Bolsova (Slovenia) Kaja Juvan	6–4, 3–6, [10–6]
Win	19–13	Mar 2022	Bendigo International, Australia	W25	Hard	(India) Rutuja Bhosale	(Australia) Alexandra Bozovic (Poland) Weronika Falkowska	4–6, 6–3, [10–4]
Win	20–13	Apr 2022	Clay Court International, Australia	W60	Clay	(Australia) Arina Rodionova	(Mexico) Fernanda Contreras (Australia) Alana Parnaby	4–6, 6–2, [11–9]
Win	21–13	Jul 2022	ITF Gurugram, India	W25	Hard	(Indonesia) Priska Madelyn Nugroho	(Japan) Momoko Kobori (Japan) Misaki Matsuda	3–6, 6–0, [10–6]
Loss	21–14	Jul 2022	Versmold Open, Germany	W100	Clay	(Netherlands) Rosalie van der Hoek	(Kazakhstan) Anna Danilina (Netherlands) Arianne Hartono	7–6^{(4)}, 4–6, [6–10]
Win	22–14	Jul 2022	ITF Nur-Sultan, Kazakhstan	W25	Hard	(Japan) Momoko Kobori	(South Korea) Choi Ji-hee (South Korea) Han Na-lae	6–2, 3–6, [10–8]
Loss	22–15	Oct 2022	ITF Cherbourg-en-Cotentin, France	W25	Hard (i)	(Netherlands) Rosalie van der Hoek	(Spain) Irene Burillo (Spain) Andrea Lázaro García	3–6, 4–6
Loss	22–16	Nov 2022	ITF Traralgon, Australia	W25	Hard	(Indonesia) Priska Madelyn Nugroho	(Australia) Destanee Aiava (New Zealand) Katherine Westbury	1–6, 6–4, [5–10]
Win	23–16	Dec 2022	ITF Solapur, India	W25	Hard	(India) Prarthana Thombare	(Indonesia) Priska Madelyn Nugroho (Russia) Ekaterina Yashina	6–1, 6–2
Loss	23–17	Dec 2022	ITF Navi Mumbai, India	W25	Hard	(India) Prarthana Thombare	(Indonesia) Priska Madelyn Nugroho (Russia) Ekaterina Yashina	3–6, 1–6
Win	24–17	Jan 2023	ITF Pune, India	W40	Hard	(India) Prarthana Thombare	(Kazakhstan) Gozal Ainitdinova (Kazakhstan) Zhibek Kulambayeva	4–6, 7–5, [10–8]
Loss	24–18	Apr 2023	ITF Nottingham, UK	W25	Hard	(India) Rutuja Bhosale	(United Kingdom) Naiktha Bains (United Kingdom) Maia Lumsden	1–6, 4–6
Loss	24–19	Apr 2023	ITF Calvi, France	W40	Hard	(France) Estelle Cascino	(United Kingdom) Naiktha Bains (United Kingdom) Maia Lumsden	4–6, 6–3, [7–10]
Win	25–19	May 2023	ITF Tbilisi, Georgia	W40	Hard	(Georgia (country)) Ekaterine Gorgodze	(Russia) Anastasia Zakharova (Russia) Anastasia Zolotareva	4–6, 6–2, [10–6]
Win	26–19	Mar 2024	ITF Gurugram, India	W35	Hard	(Kazakhstan) Zhibek Kulambayeva	(Sweden) Jacqueline Cabaj Awad (Lithuania) Justina Mikulskytė	6–4, 6–2
Loss	26–20	Mar 2024	Kōfu International Open, Japan	W50	Hard	(India) Rutuja Bhosale	(Japan) Saki Imamura (Japan) Erina Hayashi	3–6, 5–7
Win	27–20	Apr 2024	ITF Kashiwa, Japan	W50	Hard	(Chinese Taipei) Tsao Chia-yi	(United Kingdom) Madeleine Brooks (Hong Kong) Eudice Chong	6–4, 6–4
Loss	27–21	Sep 2024	Perth International, Australia	W75	Hard	(United Kingdom) Naiktha Bains	(Japan) Sakura Hosogi (Japan) Misaki Matsuda	walkover
Loss	27–22	Oct 2024	ITF Kayseri, Turkiye	W35	Hard	(Slovenia) Dalila Jakupović	(United States) Isabella Barrera Aguirre (United States) Abigail Rencheli	3–6, 6–2, [6–10]
Loss	27–23	Nov 2024	Brisbane QTC International, Australia	W50	Hard	(Japan) Yuki Naito	(Australia) Destanee Aiava (Australia) Maddison Inglis	3–6, 4–6
Loss	27–24	Nov 2024	ITF Caloundra, Australia	W50	Hard	(United Kingdom) Naiktha Bains	(Hong Kong) Eudice Chong (Hong Kong) Cody Wong	3–6, 2–6
Win	28–24	Jan 2025	ITF New Delhi, India	W50+H	Hard	(United Kingdom) Naiktha Bains	(United States) Jessie Aney (United States) Jessica Failla	6–4, 3–6, [10–8]
Loss	28–25	Mar 2025	ITF Ahmedabad, India	W50	Hard	(India) Vaishnavi Adkar	(Japan) Akiko Omae (Japan) Ikumi Yamazaki	2–6, 6–2, [7–10]
Win	29–25	Mar 2025	Jin'an Open, China	W75	Hard	(Indonesia) Priska Madelyn Nugroho	(Belarus) Kristina Dmitruk (Russia) Kira Pavlova	6–0, 6–3
Win	30–25	Jun 2025	Guimarães Ladies Open, Portugal	W50	Hard	(France) Alice Robbe	(Japan) Hiromi Abe (Japan) Kanako Morisaki	1–6, 6–4, [10–8]
Loss	30–26	Jun 2025	ITF Tauste, Spain	W35	Hard	(India) Rutuja Bhosale	(Japan) Hiromi Abe (Japan) Kanako Morisaki	3–6, 2–6
Loss	30–27	Oct 2025	ITF Kunshan, China	W35	Hard	(India) Rutuja Bhosale	(China) Li Zongyu (China) Zheng Wushuang	2–6, 2–6
Win	31–27	Dec 2025	ITF Solapur, India	W35	Hard	(India) Vaishnavi Adkar	(India) Zeel Desai; Elina Nepliy	4–6, 7–5, [10–6]
Win	32–27	Feb 2026	ITF Pune, India	W75	Hard	(India) Shrivalli Bhamidipaty	(Japan) Misaki Matsuda (Japan) Eri Shimizu	7–6^{(3)}, 6–3
Loss	32–28	Feb 2026	ITF Bengaluru, India	W100	Hard	(Indonesia) Priska Madelyn Nugroho	(Japan) Misaki Matsuda (Japan) Eri Shimizu	6–4, 3–6, [10–5]
Win	33–28	Mar 2026	ITF Kalaburagi, India	W35	Hard	(India) Vaishnavi Adkar	(India) Akanksha Dileep Nitture (India) Soha Sadiq	6–2, 6–2
Loss	33–29	Apr 2026	ITF Lopota, Georgia	W75	Hard	(India) Rutuja Bhosale	(Poland) Martyna Kubka (Czech Republic) Vendula Valdmannová	2–6, 3–6
Loss	33–30	Jun 2026	Cary Tennis Classic, United States	W100	Hard	(Japan) Hiroko Kuwata	(United States) Catherine Harrison (United States) Dalayna Hewitt	4–6, 2–6
Loss	33–31	Oct 2026	ITF Wrexham, United Kingdom	W100	Hard (i)	(Japan) Hiroko Kuwata	(United Kingdom) Freya Christie (United Kingdom) Eden Silva	2–6, 3–6

== Fed Cup participation ==
=== Singles ===
Edition	Stage	Date	Location	Against	Surface	Opponent	W/L	Score
2014 Fed Cup	Z2 R/R	5 February 2014	Astana, Kazakhstan	Pakistan	Hard (i)	Sara Mansoor	W	6–1, 6–2
2014 Fed Cup	Z2 R/R	6 February 2014	Astana, Kazakhstan	New Zealand	Hard (i)	Marina Erakovic	L	1–6, 2–6
2014 Fed Cup	Z2 P/O	7 February 2014	Astana, Kazakhstan	Hong Kong	Hard (i)	Zhang Ling	L	3–6, 4–6
2015 Fed Cup	Z2 R/R	15 April 2015	Hyderabad, India	Pakistan	Hard	Ushna Suhail	W	6–0, 6–1
2015 Fed Cup	Z2 R/R	16 April 2015	Hyderabad, India	Malaysia	Hard	Jawairiah Noordin	W	6–1, 3–6, 6–4
2015 Fed Cup	Z2 P/O	17 April 2015	Hyderabad, India	Turkmenistan	Hard	Anastasiya Prenko	W	6–1, 6–2
2016 Fed Cup	Z1 R/R	3 February 2016	Hua Hin, Thailand	Thailand	Hard	Luksika Kumkhum	L	6–7^{(5–7)}, 3–6
2016 Fed Cup	Z1 R/R	4 February 2016	Hua Hin, Thailand	Japan	Hard	Nao Hibino	W	6–3, 6–1
2016 Fed Cup	Z1 R/R	5 February 2016	Hua Hin, Thailand	Uzbekistan	Hard	Nigina Abduraimova	W	6–1, 6–0
2017 Fed Cup	Z1 R/R	8 February 2017	Astana, Kazakhstan	Japan	Hard (i)	Misaki Doi	L	0–6, 3–6
2017 Fed Cup	Z1 R/R	9 February 2017	Astana, Kazakhstan	China	Hard (i)	Zhu Lin	L	3–6, 6–3, 4–6
2017 Fed Cup	Z1 R/R	10 February 2017	Astana, Kazakhstan	Philippines	Hard (i)	Katharina Lehnert	L	3–6, 4–6
2018 Fed Cup	Z1 R/R	7 February 2018	New Delhi, India	China	Hard	Zhu Lin	W	6–3, 6–2
2018 Fed Cup	Z1 R/R	8 February 2018	New Delhi, India	Kazakhstan	Hard	Yulia Putintseva	W	6–3, 1–6, 6–4
2018 Fed Cup	Z1 R/R	9 February 2018	New Delhi, India	Hong Kong	Hard	Zhang Ling	W	6–3, 6–2
2018 Fed Cup	Z1 P/O	10 February 2018	New Delhi, India	Chinese Taipei	Hard	Hsu Chieh-yu	W	6–4, 5–7, 6–1
2019 Fed Cup	Z1 R/R	7 February 2019	Astana, Kazakhstan	Thailand	Hard (i)	Peangtarn Plipuech	W	6–7^{(3–7)}, 6–2, 6–4
2019 Fed Cup	Z1 R/R	8 February 2019	Astana, Kazakhstan	Kazakhstan	Hard (i)	Yulia Putintseva	L	1–6, 6–7^{(4–7)}
2019 Fed Cup	Z1 P/O	9 February 2019	Astana, Kazakhstan	South Korea	Hard (i)	Jeong Su-nam	W	6–3, 6–3
2020 Billie Jean King Cup	P/O	16 April 2021	Jūrmala, Latvia	Latvia	Hard (i)	Jeļena Ostapenko	L	2–6, 7–5, 5–7
2020 Billie Jean King Cup	P/O	17 April 2021	Jūrmala, Latvia	Latvia	Hard (i)	Anastasija Sevastova	L	0–6, 6–7^{(4–7)}

=== Doubles ===
Edition	Stage	Date	Location	Against	Surface	Partner	Opponents	W/L	Score
2013 Fed Cup	Z1 R/R	6 February 2013	Astana, Kazakhstan	Kazakhstan	Hard (i)	Rutuja Bhosale	Sesil Karatantcheva; Galina Voskoboeva	L	3–6, 1–6
2013 Fed Cup	Z1 R/R	8 February 2013	Astana, Kazakhstan	Thailand	Hard (i)	Rishika Sunkara	Noppawan Lertcheewakarn; Varatchaya Wongteanchai	L	1–6, 3–6
2014 Fed Cup	Z2 P/O	7 February 2014	Astana, Kazakhstan	Hong Kong	Hard (i)	Rishika Sunkara	Ng Kwan-yau; Wu Ho-ching	W	6–2, 6–1
2019 Fed Cup	Z1 R/R	7 February 2019	Astana, Kazakhstan	Thailand	Hard (i)	Karman Thandi	Nudnida Luangnam; Peangtarn Plipuech	W	6–4, 6–7^{(6–8)}, 7–5
2019 Fed Cup	Z1 P/O	9 February 2019	Astana, Kazakhstan	South Korea	Hard (i)	Prarthana Thombare	Jang Su-jeong; Kim Na-ri	L	4–6, 4–6

== Asian Games ==
=== Singles (bronze medal) ===
Medal	Date	Tournament	Location	Opponent	Score
Bronze	August 2018	2018 Asian Games	Jakarta, Indonesia	(China) Zhang Shuai	4–6, 6–7^{(6–8)}
