= Fatemehsadat Zanjani =

Iranian tennis player

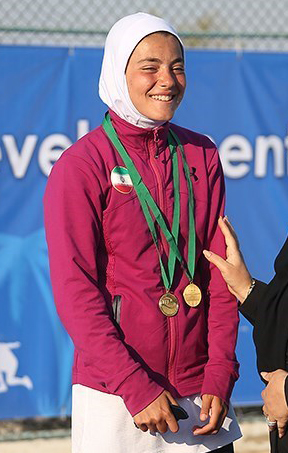
- Full name: Fatemehsadat Zanjani
- Country (sports): Iran
- Born: 29 July 2004 (age 20); Gorgan, Iran
- Plays: Right-handed

Singles
- Career record: 43–36
- Highest ranking: No. 1681 (18 April 2022)
- Last updated on: 18 August 2023.

Fatemehsadat Zanjani (Persian: فاطمه‌سادات زنجانی, born 29 July 2004 in Gorgan), also known as Melina Zanjani, is an Iranian female tennis player who plays for the National women's Tennis team of Iran. She currently holds the no.1 ranking of Iranian female senior tennis players after her championship titles.

Zanjani has a career high WTA Singles Ranking of 1681 achieved on 18 April 2022. She also has a career high ITF Junior Singles Ranking of 511 achieved on 18 July 2022.
