= 2019 Fed Cup =

International women's tennis competition

Details
- Duration: 6 February – 10 November
- Edition: 57th

Achievements (singles)

The 2019 Fed Cup was the 57th edition of the Fed Cup international team women's tennis tournament.

Romania upset title holders and 11-time winners Czech Republic in Ostrava in the quarterfinals, before themselves losing to eventual champions France in the semifinals. France won the final against Australia.

Bangladesh made its first appearance in the tournament.

== World Group ==
Participating teams
| Australia | Belarus | Belgium | Czech Republic |
| France | Germany | Romania | United States |

=== Seeds ===
1. Czech Republic (quarterfinals)
2. United States (quarterfinals)
3. Belarus (semifinals)
4. France (champions)

=== Draw ===
Quarterfinals; 9–10 February
Ostrava, Czech Republic (hard, indoor)
1 | Czech Republic | 2
Romania | 3
Liège, Belgium (hard, indoor)
4 | France | 3
Belgium | 1
Braunschweig, Germany (hard, indoor)
Germany | 0
3 | Belarus | 4
Asheville, United States (hard, indoor)
Australia | 3
2 | United States | 2

Semifinals; 20–21 April
Rouen, France (clay, indoor)
Romania | 2
4 | France | 3
Brisbane, Australia (hard)
3 | Belarus | 2
Australia | 3

Final; 9–10 November
Perth, Australia (hard)
4 | France | 3
Australia | 2

== World Group play-offs ==
The four losing teams in the World Group first round ties and four winners of the World Group II ties competed in the World Group play-offs.

At the time of the ties taking place, it was expected that the winners would secure a place in the World Group for 2020, while the losers would be relegated to World Group II, in accordance with the existing competition structure. However, the restructuring of the Fed Cup for 2020 announced on 27 June 2019 stipulated that all eight nations which participated in the World Group play-offs would enter into the 2020 Fed Cup Qualifiers. Consequently, the results of the 2019 World Group play-off ties had no bearing on promotion or relegation for the following year.

Participating teams
| Belgium | Canada | Czech Republic | Germany |
| Latvia | Spain | Switzerland | United States |

=== Seeds ===
1. Czech Republic
2. United States
3. Germany
4. Belgium

| Venue | Surface | Home team | Score | Visiting team |
|---|---|---|---|---|
| Prostějov, Czech Republic | Clay (i) | Czech Republic | 4–0 | Canada |
| San Antonio, United States | Hard (i) | United States | 3–2 | Switzerland |
| Riga, Latvia | Hard (i) | Latvia | 1–3 | Germany |
| Kortrijk, Belgium | Hard (i) | Belgium | 2–3 | Spain |

== World Group II ==
The four winners of World Group II advanced to the World Group play-offs, whereas the four losers played the World Group II play-offs.

Participating teams
| Canada | Italy | Japan | Latvia |
| Netherlands | Slovakia | Spain | Switzerland |

=== Seeds ===
1. Switzerland
2. Netherlands
3. Slovakia
4. Japan

| Venue | Surface | Home team | Score | Visiting team |
|---|---|---|---|---|
| Biel/Bienne, Switzerland | Hard (i) | Switzerland | 3–1 | Italy |
| Riga, Latvia | Hard (i) | Latvia | 4–0 | Slovakia |
| Kitakyushu, Japan | Hard (i) | Japan | 2–3 | Spain |
| 's-Hertogenbosch, Netherlands | Clay (i) | Netherlands | 0–4 | Canada |

== World Group II play-offs ==
The four losing teams in the World Group II ties and four winners of the zonal Groups I competed in the World Group II play-offs.

At the time of the ties taking place, it was expected that the winners would secure a place in the World Group II for 2020, while the losers would be relegated to their respective zonal Group I, in accordance with the existing competition structure. However, the restructuring of the Fed Cup for 2020 announced on 27 June 2019 stipulated that the four winning nations will instead enter the 2020 Fed Cup Qualifiers. Of the four losing nations, the two with the highest ITF Fed Cup Nations Ranking (as of 22 April 2019) will also enter the 2020 Fed Cup Qualifiers, while only the remaining two losing nations will be relegated to their respective zonal Group I.

Participating Teams
| Brazil | Great Britain | Italy | Japan |
| Kazakhstan | Netherlands | Russia | Slovakia |

=== Seeds ===
1. Russia
2. Netherlands
3. Great Britain
4. Slovakia

| Venue | Surface | Home team | Score | Visiting team |
|---|---|---|---|---|
| Moscow, Russia | Clay (i) | Russia | 4–0 | Italy |
| Osaka, Japan | Hard | Japan | 4–0 | Netherlands |
| London, Great Britain | Hard (i) | Great Britain | 3–1 | Kazakhstan |
| Bratislava, Slovakia | Clay (i) | Slovakia | 3–1 | Brazil |

=== Status of losing teams ===
Russia, Japan, Great Britain and Slovakia entered the 2020 Fed Cup Qualifiers, having won their respective World Group II play-off ties. The fate of the four losing nations depended on their ITF Fed Cup Nations Ranking as of 22 April 2019.

| Nation | ITF Fed Cup Nations Ranking (as of 22 April 2019) | Status |
|---|---|---|
| Kazakhstan | 17 | Entry into 2020 Fed Cup Qualifiers |
| Brazil | 18 | Entry into 2020 Fed Cup Qualifiers |
| Netherlands | 19 | Entry into 2020 Fed Cup Qualifiers |
| Italy | 24 | Entry into 2020 Europe/Africa Zone Group I |

== Americas Zone ==
=== Group I ===
Venue: Club Campestre Sede Llanogrande, Medellín, Colombia (clay)

Dates: 6–9 February

Participating teams

Pool A

- Colombia
- Ecuador
- Mexico
- Paraguay

Pool B

- Argentina
- Brazil
- Chile
- Puerto Rico

==== Play-offs ====
- Brazil was promoted to the 2019 Fed Cup World Group II play-offs.
- Puerto Rico and Ecuador were relegated to Americas Zone Group II in 2020.

=== Group II ===
Venue 1: Tennis Club Las Terrazas Miraflores, Lima, Peru (clay)
Venue 2: Centro Nacional de Tenis, Santo Domingo, Dominican Republic (hard)

Dates: 16–20 April

Participating teams

Pool A (Lima)

- Bolivia
- Panama
- Peru

Pool B (Lima)

- Bahamas
- Barbados
- Trinidad and Tobago

Pool A (Santo Domingo)

- Cuba
- Dominican Republic
- Guatemala
- Uruguay
- Venezuela

Withdrawn

- Bermuda
- Costa Rica
- Honduras

Inactive teams

- Antigua and Barbuda
- El Salvador
- Eastern Caribbean
- Haiti
- Jamaica

==== Play-offs ====
- Peru and Venezuela were promoted to Americas Zone Group I in 2020.

== Asia/Oceania Zone ==
=== Group I ===
Venue: Daulet National Tennis Centre, Astana, Kazakhstan (indoor hard)

Dates: 6–9 February

Participating teams

Pool A

- India
- Kazakhstan
- Thailand

Pool B

- China
- Indonesia
- Pacific Oceania
- South Korea

==== Play-offs ====
- Kazakhstan was promoted to the 2019 Fed Cup World Group II play-offs.
- Thailand and Pacific Oceania were relegated to Asia/Oceania Zone Group II in 2020.

=== Group II ===
Venue 1: Pamir Stadium, Dushanbe, Tajikistan (hard)

Dates: 12–15 June

Venue 2: National Tennis Centre, Kuala Lumpur, Malaysia (hard)

Dates: 19–23 June

Participating teams

Pool A (Dushanbe)

- Chinese Taipei
- Philippines
- Tajikistan

Pool B (Dushanbe)

- Iran
- Singapore
- Sri Lanka

Pool A (Kuala Lumpur)

- Malaysia
- Turkmenistan
- Uzbekistan

Pool B (Kuala Lumpur)

- Bangladesh
- Hong Kong
- New Zealand
- Pakistan

Withdrawn

- Bahrain
- Kyrgyzstan
- Lebanon
- Oman

Inactive teams

- Brunei
- Iraq
- Jordan
- Syria
- Vietnam

==== Play-offs ====
- Chinese Taipei and Uzbekistan were promoted to Asia/Oceania Zone Group I in 2020.

== Europe/Africa Zone ==
=== Group I ===
Venue 1: Hala Widowiskowo-Sportowa, Zielona Góra, Poland (indoor hard)
Venue 2: University of Bath, Bath, United Kingdom (indoor hard)

Dates: 6–9 February

Participating teams

Pool A (Zielona Góra)

- Denmark
- Poland
- Russia

Pool B (Zielona Góra)

- Bulgaria
- Estonia
- Sweden
- Ukraine

Pool A (Bath)

- Great Britain
- Greece
- Hungary
- Slovenia

Pool B (Bath)

- Croatia
- Georgia
- Serbia
- Turkey

==== Play-offs ====
- Russia and Great Britain were promoted to the 2019 Fed Cup World Group II play-offs.
- Denmark and Georgia were relegated to Europe/Africa Zone Group II in 2020.

=== Group II ===
Venue: Centre National de Tennis, Esch-sur-Alzette, Luxembourg (indoor hard)

Dates: 6–9 February

Participating teams

Pool A

- Austria
- Bosnia and Herzegovina
- Tunisia

Pool B

- Israel
- Luxembourg
- Portugal
- South Africa

==== Play-offs ====
- Austria and Luxembourg were promoted to Europe/Africa Zone Group I in 2020.
- Bosnia and Herzegovina and South Africa were relegated to Europe/Africa Zone Group III in 2020.

=== Group III ===
Venue 1: Tali Tennis Center, Helsinki, Finland (indoor hard)
Venue 2: Ulcinj Bellevue, Ulcinj, Montenegro (clay)

Dates: 15–20 April

Participating teams

Pool A (Helsinki)

- Finland
- Iceland
- Lithuania
- Malta

Pool B (Helsinki)

- Algeria
- Congo
- Cyprus
- Kosovo
- North Macedonia

Pool A (Ulcinj)

- Armenia
- Montenegro
- Norway

Pool B (Ulcinj)

- Egypt
- Ireland
- Kenya
- Morocco

Withdrawn

- Madagascar
- Uganda

Inactive teams

- Azerbaijan
- Botswana
- Cameroon
- Ethiopia
- Lesotho
- Liechtenstein
- Mauritius
- Moldova
- Mozambique
- Namibia
- San Marino
- Senegal
- Zimbabwe

==== Play-offs ====
- Finland and Egypt were promoted to Europe/Africa Zone Group II in 2020.
