= Bangladesh Billie Jean King Cup team =

Bangladeshi women's tennis team

Bangladesh
- Captain: Shibu Lal
- ITF ranking: NR (22 April 2019)
- First year: 2019
- Years played: 1
- Ties played (W–L): 1 (0–1)

The Bangladesh Billie Jean King Cup team represents Bangladesh in the Billie Jean King Cup tennis competition and are governed by the Bangladesh Tennis Federation. They took part in the Fed Cup for the first time in 2019, competing in the Asia/Oceania Zone Group II.

== Players ==
Year	Team			
2019	Mashfia Afrin	Eshita Afrose	Jarin Sultana Jolly	Susmita Sen

== See also ==
- Billie Jean King Cup
- Bangladesh Davis Cup team
