= 2017 XIXO Ladies Open Hódmezővásárhely =

- Date: 12–18 June
- Edition: 2nd
- Category: ITF Women's Circuit
- Prize money: $60,000
- Surface: Clay
- Location: Hódmezővásárhely, Hungary

Champions

Singles
- (Romania) Mihaela Buzărnescu

Doubles
- (Japan) Kotomi Takahata / (India) Prarthana Thombare
← 2016 ·	Ladies Open Hódmezővásárhely	· 2018 →

The 2017 XIXO Ladies Open Hódmezővásárhely was a professional tennis tournament played on outdoor clay courts. It was the second edition of the tournament and part of the 2017 ITF Women's Circuit, offering a total of $60,000 in prize money. It took place in Hódmezővásárhely, Hungary, from 12–18 June 2017.

== Point distribution ==
Event	W	F	SF	QF	Round of 16	Round of 32	Q	Q2	Q3
Singles	80	48	29	15	8	1	5	3	1
Doubles	80	48	29	15	1	—	—	—	—

== Singles main draw entrants ==
=== Seeds ===
Country	Player	Rank^{1}	Seed
ROU	Ana Bogdan	106	1
MNE	Danka Kovinić	107	2
BUL	Viktoriya Tomova	136	3
BUL	Elitsa Kostova	150	4
HUN	Dalma Gálfi	154	5
TUR	Çağla Büyükakçay	155	6
SLO	Tamara Zidanšek	158	7
AUT	Barbara Haas	161	8

- ^{1} Rankings as of 29 May 2017

=== Other entrants ===
The following players received wildcards into the singles main draw:

- (Hungary) Bianka Békefi
- (Serbia) Olga Danilović
- (Ukraine) Marta Kostyuk
- (Hungary) Panna Udvardy

The following player received entry into the singles main draw by a protected ranking:

- (Romania) Mihaela Buzărnescu

The following players received entry from the qualifying draw:

- (Norway) Ulrikke Eikeri
- (Slovakia) Vivien Juhászová
- (Slovakia) Tereza Mihalíková
- (Russia) Alexandra Panova

== Champions ==
=== Singles ===
- (Romania) Mihaela Buzărnescu def. (Montenegro) Danka Kovinić, 6–2, 6–1

=== Doubles ===
- (Japan) Kotomi Takahata / (India) Prarthana Thombare def. (Norway) Ulrikke Eikeri / (Croatia) Tereza Mrdeža, 1–0, retired
