= 2018 Hódmezővásárhely Ladies Open =

- Date: 11–17 June
- Edition: 3rd
- Category: ITF Women's Circuit
- Prize money: $60,000
- Surface: Clay
- Location: Hódmezővásárhely, Hungary

Champions

Singles
- (Colombia) Mariana Duque Mariño

Doubles
- (Hungary) Réka Luca Jani / (Argentina) Nadia Podoroska
← 2017 ·	Hódmezővásárhely Ladies Open	· 2019 →

The 2018 Hódmezővásárhely Ladies Open was a professional tennis tournament played on outdoor clay courts. It was the third edition of the tournament and was part of the 2018 ITF Women's Circuit. It took place in Hódmezővásárhely, Hungary, on 11–17 June 2018.

== Singles main draw entrants ==
=== Seeds ===
Country	Player	Rank^{1}	Seed
COL	Mariana Duque Mariño	112	1
MNE	Danka Kovinić	115	2
UKR	Anhelina Kalinina	126	3
BUL	Viktoriya Tomova	135	4
RUS	Irina Khromacheva	148	5
ROU	Alexandra Dulgheru	159	6
RUS	Valentyna Ivakhnenko	173	7
ROU	Irina Bara	175	8

- ^{1} Rankings as of 28 May 2018.

=== Other entrants ===
The following players received a wildcard into the singles main draw:

- (Hungary) Anna Bondár
- (Hungary) Réka Luca Jani
- (Serbia) Nina Stojanović
- (Hungary) Panna Udvardy

The following players received entry from the qualifying draw:

- (Lithuania) Joana Eidukonytė
- (Russia) Sofya Lansere
- (Germany) Tayisiya Morderger
- (Argentina) Nadia Podoroska

The following player received entry as a lucky loser:

- (Serbia) Draginja Vuković

== Champions ==
=== Singles ===
- (Colombia) Mariana Duque Mariño def. (Romania) Irina Bara, 4–6, 7–5, 6–2

=== Doubles ===
- (Hungary) Réka Luca Jani / (Argentina) Nadia Podoroska def. (Montenegro) Danka Kovinić / (Serbia) Nina Stojanović, 6–4, 6–4
