= Yadlapalli =

Yadlapalli is a Telugu surname. Notable people with the surname include:

- Pranjala Yadlapalli (born 1999), Indian tennis player
- Venkateswara Rao Yadlapalli (fl. 2005), Indian agriculturalist
