= 2018 Hódmezővásárhely Ladies Open – Doubles =

Doubles
- 2018 Hódmezővásárhely Ladies Open

Final
- Champions: (Hungary) Réka Luca Jani (Argentina) Nadia Podoroska
- Runners-up: (Montenegro) Danka Kovinić (Serbia) Nina Stojanović
- Score: 6–4, 6–4

Events
Singles	Doubles
← 2017 ·	Hódmezővásárhely Ladies Open	· 2019 →

Kotomi Takahata and Prarthana Thombare were the defending champions, however Takahata chose to participate in Kōfu, while Thombare chose to participate in Manchester.

Réka Luca Jani and Nadia Podoroska won the title after defeating Danka Kovinić and Nina Stojanović 6–4, 6–4 in the final.

== Seeds ==
1. (Romania) Irina Bara / (Slovakia) Chantal Škamlová (quarterfinals)
2. (Montenegro) Danka Kovinić / (Serbia) Nina Stojanović (final)
3. (Slovakia) Michaela Hončová / (Netherlands) Erika Vogelsang (first round)
4. (Uzbekistan) Akgul Amanmuradova / (Russia) Valentyna Ivakhnenko (semifinals)

== Draw ==
=== Key ===
- Q = Qualifier
- WC = Wild card
- LL = Lucky loser
- Alt = Alternate
- SE = Special exempt
- PR = Protected ranking
- ITF = ITF entry
- JE = Junior exempt
- w/o = Walkover
- r = Retired
- d = Defaulted
- SR = Special ranking

=== Draw ===
First round
1	(Romania) I Bara (Slovakia) C Škamlová	6	7^{7}
(Italy) A Grymalska (Serbia) N Kostić	4	6^{3}
(Hungary) RL Jani (Argentina) N Podoroska	7^{7}	7
(Russia) S Lansere (Hungary) A Nagy	6^{3}	5
4	(Uzbekistan) A Amanmuradova (Russia) V Ivakhnenko	6	6
WC	(Hungary) A Horváth (Hungary) L Nagymihály	3	4
(Serbia) T Čurović (Austria) K Trickovic	6	6^{3}	[11]
WC	(Hungary) D Drahota-Szabó (Hungary) R Zádori	2	7^{7}	[9]
(Lithuania) J Eidukonytė (Austria) J Trickovic	4	2
(Hungary) Á Bukta (Germany) A Zaja	6	6
WC	(Hungary) R Fárbás (Slovakia) L Svatíková	6	0	[10]
3	(Slovakia) M Hončová (Netherlands) E Vogelsang	4	6	[6]
(Germany) T Morderger (Germany) Y Morderger	4	3
(Hungary) A Bondár (Hungary) P Udvardy	6	6
(Romania) C Dinu (Ukraine) G Poznikhirenko	3	5
2	(Montenegro) D Kovinić (Serbia) N Stojanović	6	7

Quarterfinals
1	(Romania) I Bara (Slovakia) C Škamlová	4	6	[7]
(Hungary) RL Jani (Argentina) N Podoroska	6	3	[10]
4	(Uzbekistan) A Amanmuradova (Russia) V Ivakhnenko	6	6
(Serbia) T Čurović (Austria) K Trickovic	2	1
(Hungary) Á Bukta (Germany) A Zaja	6	6
WC	(Hungary) R Fárbás (Slovakia) L Svatíková	0	2
(Hungary) A Bondár (Hungary) P Udvardy	0	4
2	(Montenegro) D Kovinić (Serbia) N Stojanović	6	6

Semifinals
(Hungary) RL Jani (Argentina) N Podoroska	5	6	[10]
4	(Uzbekistan) A Amanmuradova (Russia) V Ivakhnenko	7	1	[6]
(Hungary) Á Bukta (Germany) A Zaja	2	1
2	(Montenegro) D Kovinić (Serbia) N Stojanović	6	6

Final
(Hungary) RL Jani (Argentina) N Podoroska	6	6
2	(Montenegro) D Kovinić (Serbia) N Stojanović	4	4
