= 2018 Hódmezővásárhely Ladies Open – Singles =

Singles
- 2018 Hódmezővásárhely Ladies Open

Final
- Champion: (Colombia) Mariana Duque Mariño
- Runner-up: (Romania) Irina Bara
- Score: 4–6, 7–5, 6–2

Events
Singles	Doubles
← 2017 ·	Hódmezővásárhely Ladies Open	· 2019 →

Mihaela Buzărnescu was the defending champion, but chose to participate in Nottingham instead.

Mariana Duque Mariño won the title, defeating Irina Bara in the final, 4–6, 7–5, 6–2.

== Seeds ==
1. (Colombia) Mariana Duque Mariño (champion)
2. (Montenegro) Danka Kovinić (first round)
3. (Ukraine) Anhelina Kalinina (quarterfinals)
4. (Bulgaria) Viktoriya Tomova (first round)
5. (Russia) Irina Khromacheva (semifinals)
6. (Romania) Alexandra Dulgheru (first round, retired)
7. (Russia) Valentyna Ivakhnenko (quarterfinals)
8. (Romania) Irina Bara (final)

== Draw ==
=== Key ===
- Q = Qualifier
- WC = Wild card
- LL = Lucky loser
- Alt = Alternate
- SE = Special exempt
- PR = Protected ranking
- ITF = ITF entry
- JE = Junior exempt
- w/o = Walkover
- r = Retired
- d = Defaulted
- SR = Special ranking

=== Finals ===
Semifinals
1	(Colombia) Mariana Duque Mariño	6	6
(Turkey) Çağla Büyükakçay	4	0
8	(Romania) Irina Bara	7	6
5	(Russia) Irina Khromacheva	5	1

Final
1	(Colombia) Mariana Duque Mariño	4	7	6
8	(Romania) Irina Bara	6	5	2

=== Top half ===
First round
1	(Colombia) M Duque Mariño	6	6
LL	(Serbia) D Vuković	4	4
(Germany) A Zaja	6	6
WC	(Hungary) A Bondár	3	2
(Slovakia) M Hončová	6	6
(Slovakia) C Škamlová	3	2
(Italy) A Grymalska	4	6	1
7	(Russia) V Ivakhnenko	6	4	6
3	(Ukraine) A Kalinina	6	6
(Romania) C Dinu	2	2
(United States) F Di Lorenzo	6	6
(Bulgaria) S Karatantcheva	3	0
Q	(Russia) S Lansere	3	6	6
(Ukraine) G Poznikhirenko	6	4	1
(Turkey) Ç Büyükakçay	4
6	(Romania) A Dulgheru	1^{r}

Second round
1	(Colombia) M Duque Mariño	6	6
(Germany) A Zaja	2	2
(Slovakia) M Hončová	1	4
7	(Russia) V Ivakhnenko	6	6
3	(Ukraine) A Kalinina	6	6
(United States) F Di Lorenzo	4	2
Q	(Russia) S Lansere	4	1
(Turkey) Ç Büyükakçay	6	6

Quarterfinals
1	(Colombia) M Duque Mariño	6	6
7	(Russia) V Ivakhnenko	4	2
3	(Ukraine) A Kalinina	5	2
(Turkey) Ç Büyükakçay	7	6

Semifinals
1	(Colombia) M Duque Mariño	6	6
(Turkey) Ç Büyükakçay	4	0

=== Bottom half ===
First round
8	(Romania) I Bara	6	6
Q	(Lithuania) J Eidukonytė	0	0
(Romania) MB Bulgaru	6	6
Q	(Argentina) N Podoroska	4	2
(Ukraine) K Zavatska	6	6
Q	(Germany) T Morderger	3	4
WC	(Hungary) RL Jani	6	6
4	(Bulgaria) V Tomova	4	3
5	(Russia) I Khromacheva	7	6
(Czech Republic) M Kolodziejová	5	0
(Serbia) N Kostić	6	6
(Uzbekistan) A Amanmuradova	3	4
WC	(Hungary) P Udvardy	4	2
(Hungary) D Gálfi	6	1^{r}
WC	(Serbia) N Stojanović	6	4	6
2	(Montenegro) D Kovinić	3	6	3

Second round
8	(Romania) I Bara	6	6
(Romania) MB Bulgaru	4	3
(Ukraine) K Zavatska	6	6
WC	(Hungary) RL Jani	4	4
5	(Russia) I Khromacheva	4	6	6
(Serbia) N Kostić	6	4	3
WC	(Hungary) P Udvardy	4	0
WC	(Serbia) N Stojanović	6	6

Quarterfinals
8	(Romania) I Bara	6	2	7^{7}
(Ukraine) K Zavatska	4	6	6^{3}
5	(Russia) I Khromacheva	6	6
WC	(Serbia) N Stojanović	2	3

Semifinals
8	(Romania) I Bara	7	6
5	(Russia) I Khromacheva	5	1
