= Riya Bhatia =

Indian professional tennis player

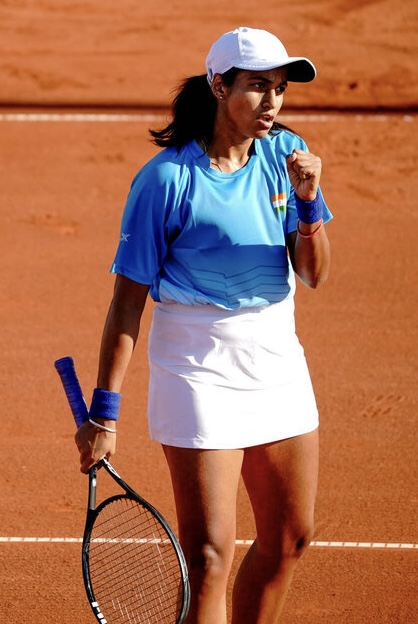
- Bhatia in 2022 at Antalya, Turkey
- Country (sports): India
- Residence: West Delhi, India
- Born: 24 September 1997 (age 28) Rohtak, Haryana, India
- Height: 174 cm (5 ft 9 in)
- Turned pro: 2016
- Plays: Right (two-handed backhand)
- Prize money: $140,969

Singles
- Career record: 226–244
- Career titles: 3 ITF
- Highest ranking: No. 338 (2 March 2020)
- Current ranking: No. 729 (18 May 2026)

Doubles
- Career record: 179–194
- Career titles: 4 ITF
- Highest ranking: No. 177 (15 December 2025)
- Current ranking: No. 273 (18 May 2026)

Team competitions
- Fed Cup: 2–8
- Last updated on: 21 May 2026.

Riya Bhatia (Hindi: रिया भाटिया; born 24 September 1997) is an Indian professional tennis player.

Formerly ranked No. 2 in India, Bhatia has career-high WTA rankings of 338 in singles, achieved on 2 March 2020, and 177 in doubles, reached on 15 December 2025. She has won three singles and four doubles titles on the ITF Women's Circuit.

She has represented her country at the 2017 Indoor Asian Games, Turkmenistan and the 2018 Asian Games in Palembang. Bhatia was a part of Indian National Women's team in the Billie Jean King Cup for five years between 2017 and 2022.

Bhatia is the only female player who has won two national titles: the hardcourt and grass-court national championships both in the year of 2016.

She made her WTA Tour main-draw debut as a lucky loser at the 2021 Bad Homburg Open, losing to Laura Siegemund in the first round.

== ITF Circuit finals ==
=== Singles: 7 (3 titles, 4 runner-ups) ===
Legend
W25 tournaments
W10/15 tournaments

Result	W–L	Date	Tournament	Tier	Surface	Opponent	Score
Loss	0–1	Nov 2015	ITF Gulbarga, India	W10	Hard	(India) Prerna Bhambri	6–4, 5–7, 4–6
Win	1–1	Sep 2016	ITF Sharm El Sheikh, Egypt	W10	Hard	(Romania) Ana Bianca Mihăilă	3–6, 6–4, 6–0
Loss	1–2	Dec 2016	ITF Djibouti City	W10	Hard	(Russia) Margarita Lazareva	6–7^{(10)}, 3–6
Loss	1–3	Dec 2016	ITF Djibouti City	W10	Hard	(Russia) Margarita Lazareva	2–6, 2–6
Loss	1–4	Jun 2017	ITF Curtea de Argeș, Romania	W15	Clay	(Romania) Georgia Crăciun	1–6, 1–6
Win	2–4	Oct 2017	ITF Colombo, Sri Lanka	W15	Hard	(France) Joséphine Boualem	7–6^{(2)}, 6–1
Win	3–4	Oct 2019	Lagos Open, Nigeria	W25	Hard	(Slovenia) Nastja Kolar	7–5, 1–6, 6–3

=== Doubles: 25 (4 titles, 21 runner-ups) ===
Legend
W75 tournaments
W50 tournaments
W25 tournaments
W10/15 tournaments

Result	W–L	Date	Tournament	Tier	Surface	Partner	Opponents	Score
Loss	0–1	May 2015	ITF Nashik, India	W10	Clay	(India) Karman Thandi	(India) Sowjanya Bavisetti (India) Rishika Sunkara	6–7^{(5)}, 2–6
Loss	0–2	Jan 2016	ITF Cairo, Egypt	W10	Clay	(India) Eetee Maheta	(Czech Republic) Petra Krejsová (Slovakia) Chantal Škamlová	3–6, 2–6
Loss	0–3	Oct 2016	ITF Pune, India	W10	Hard	(India) Shweta Chandra Rana	(India) Sharmada Balu (India) Dhruthi Tatachar Venugopal	4–6, 0–6
Win	1–3	Dec 2016	ITF Djibouti City	W10	Hard	(France) Kassandra Davesne	(Russia) Margarita Lazareva (France) Kélia Le Bihan	6–4, 6–4
Loss	1–4	Dec 2016	ITF Djibouti City	W10	Hard	(Russia) Margarita Lazareva	(France) Kassandra Davesne (France) Kélia Le Bihan	3–6, 6–4, [8–10]
Loss	1–5	Mar 2017	ITF Gwalior, India	W15	Hard	(India) Shweta Chandra Rana	(India) Natasha Palha (India) Rishika Sunkara	4–6, 2–6
Loss	1–6	Jun 2017	ITF Niš, Serbia	W15	Clay	(Australia) Angelique Svinos	(Ukraine) Alona Fomina (Russia) Daria Kruzhkova	0–6, 5–7
Loss	1–7	Jun 2017	ITF Banja Luka, BiH	W15	Clay	(Serbia) Tamara Čurović	(Turkey) Berfu Cengiz (Bulgaria) Ani Vangelova	5–7, 6–7^{(4)}
Loss	1–8	Jul 2017	ITF Târgu Jiu, Romania	W15	Clay	(Romania) Oana Gavrilă	(Australia) Samantha Harris (Australia) Belinda Woolcock	3–6, 2–6
Loss	1–9	May 2018	ITF Cairo, Egypt	W15	Hard	(United States) Shelby Talcott	(Bulgaria) Petia Arshinkova (Bulgaria) Gergana Topalova	6–4, 3–6, [4–10]
Win	2–9	May 2018	ITF Tiberias, Israel	W15	Hard	(United States) Madeleine Kobelt	(Israel) Shavit Kimchi (Israel) Maya Tahan	6–3, 6–2
Loss	2–10	Sep 2018	ITF Nonthaburi, Thailand	W15	Hard	(China) Lu Jiaxi	(Chinese Taipei) Cho I-hsuan (China) Wang Danni	4–6, 3–6
Win	3–10	Aug 2019	ITF Taipei, Taiwan	W25	Hard	(Japan) Ramu Ueda	(Chinese Taipei) Cho I-hsuan (Chinese Taipei) Cho Yi-tsen	7–5, 6–2
Loss	3–11	Nov 2020	ITF Lousada, Portugal	W15	Hard (i)	(Portugal) Inês Murta	(Netherlands) Arianne Hartono (Japan) Lily Miyazaki	1–6, 7–5, [7–10]
Loss	3–12	Mar 2021	ITF Pune, India	W25	Hard	(Romania) Miriam Bulgaru	(India) Rutuja Bhosale (United Kingdom) Emily Webley-Smith	2–6, 5–7
Loss	3–13	May 2021	ITF Oeiras, Portugal	W25	Clay	(Brazil) Gabriela Cé	(Hungary) Adrienn Nagy (South Korea) Park So-hyun	4–6, 0–6
Loss	3–14	Aug 2022	ITF Rio de Janeiro, Brazil	W25	Clay	(Colombia) María Paulina Pérez	(Brazil) Thaísa Grana Pedretti (Bolivia) Noelia Zeballos	3–6, 1–6
Loss	3–15	June 2024	ITF Santo Domingo, Dominican Republic	W15	Hard	(India) Sharmada Balu	(Canada) Raphaëlle Lacasse (Dominican Republic) Ana Carmen Zamburek	3–6, 4–6
Win	4–15	Oct 2024	ITF Mysuru, India	W15	Hard	(United States) Jessie Aney	(India) Akanksha Dileep Nitture (India) Soha Sadiq	6–1, 6–1
Loss	4–16	Oct 2024	Hamburg Ladies Cup, Germany	W75	Hard (i)	(Netherlands) Lian Tran	(United Kingdom) Madeleine Brooks (Netherlands) Isabelle Haverlag	3–6, 2–6
Loss	4–17	Nov 2024	ITF Funchal, Portugal	W50	Hard	(Russia) Polina Iatcenko	(United Kingdom) Holly Hutchinson (United Kingdom) Ella McDonald	6–3, 2–6, [8–10]
Loss	4–18	Dec 2024	ITF Navi Mumbai, India	W50	Hard	(India) Zeel Desai	(Japan) Kanako Morisaki (Japan) Naho Sato	6–4, 3–6, [7–10]
Loss	4–19	Apr 2025	ITF Calvi, France	W75	Hard	(Burundi) Sada Nahimana	(Bulgaria) Lia Karatancheva (Sweden) Lisa Zaar	4–6, 3–6
Loss	4–20	Jun 2025	ITS Bucharest, Romania	W75	Clay	(Burundi) Sada Nahimana	(France) Estelle Cascino (Romania) Patricia Maria Țig	6–4, 3–6, [6–10]
Loss	4–21	Jul 2025	ITF Corroios, Portugal	W50	Hard	(Australia) Elena Micic	(Hong Kong) Eudice Chong (Chinese Taipei) Liang En-shuo	1–6, 0–6
