= Sharmada Balu =

Indian tennis player (born 1993)

- Country (sports): India
- Residence: Bengaluru, India
- Born: 9 August 1993 (age 33) Bengaluru
- Height: 1.75 m (5 ft 9 in)
- Plays: Right (two-handed backhand)
- Prize money: $46,170

Singles
- Career record: 126–137
- Career titles: 2 ITF
- Highest ranking: No. 582 (30 November 2015)

Doubles
- Career record: 182–117
- Career titles: 16 ITF
- Highest ranking: No. 335 (3 August 2015)
Medal record
Representing India
Women's tennis
South Asian Games
Gold medal – first place	2016 Guwahati	Women's doubles

Sharmada Balu (born 9 August 1993) is an Indian former tennis player.

Balu has career-high WTA rankings of 582 in singles, achieved on 30 November 2015, and 335 in doubles, reached on 3 August 2015. She won two singles and 16 doubles titles at tournaments of the ITF Women's Circuit.

She won the gold medal for India in the doubles competition in partnership with Prarthana Thombare at the 12th South Asian Games held in Guwahati, India in February 2016.

She decided to quit tennis at the end of 2016 due to an injury and lack of financial support. Five years later, she started playing tennis again. Balu made her WTA Tour main-draw debut at the 2022 Chennai Open in the doubles tournament, partnering with her compatriot Riya Bhatia.

== ITF Circuit finals ==
Legend
$25,000 tournaments
$10/15,000 tournaments

=== Singles: 2 (2 titles) ===
Result	W–L	Date	Tournament	Tier	Surface	Opponent	Score
Win	1–0	Apr 2011	ITF Lucknow, India	10,000	Grass	(Austria) Yvonne Neuwirth	6–3, 2–6, 6–2
Win	2–0	May 2015	ITF Bhopal, India	10,000	Hard	(India) Sowjanya Bavisetti	6–2, 6–3

=== Doubles: 29 (16 titles, 13 runner-ups) ===
Result	W–L	Date	Tournament	Tier	Surface	Partner	Opponents	Score
Loss	0–1	Apr 2012	ITF Les Franqueses del Vallès, Spain	10,000	Hard	(China) He Sirui	(Germany) Carolin Daniels (Russia) Eugeniya Pashkova	4–6, 3–6
Win	1–1	Mar 2013	ITF Hyderabad, India	10,000	Hard	(India) Sowjanya Bavisetti	(Germany) Michaela Frlicka (Czech Republic) Tereza Malíková	7–5, 5–7, [10–8]
Loss	1–2	Mar 2013	ITF Hyderabad, India	10,000	Hard	(India) Sowjanya Bavisetti	(India) Natasha Palha (India) Prarthana Thombare	1–6, 4–6
Win	2–2	Jul 2013	ITF New Delhi, India	10,000	Hard	(India) Sowjanya Bavisetti	(India) Ankita Raina (India) Shweta Rana	6–2, 6–4
Win	3–2	Apr 2014	ITF Chennai, India	10,000	Clay	(India) Rishika Sunkara	(India) Natasha Palha (India) Prarthana Thombare	6–0, 7–6^{(4)}
Win	4–2	May 2014	ITF Hyderabad, India	10,000	Hard	(India) Rishika Sunkara	(India) Shweta Rana (India) Prarthana Thombare	6–1, 7–5
Loss	4–3	Aug 2014	ITF New Delhi, India	10,000	Hard	(China) Wang Xiyao	(India) Rutuja Bhosale (South Korea) Kim Da-bin	3–6, 4–6
Win	5–3	Aug 2014	ITF Bangalore, India	10,000	Hard	(India) Prarthana Thombare	(Chinese Taipei) Hsu Ching-wen (India) Natasha Palha	6–4, 0–6, [10–6]
Win	6–3	Oct 2014	ITF Sharm El Sheikh, Egypt	10,000	Hard	(China) Wang Xiyao	(United Kingdom) Harriet Dart (United Kingdom) Eden Silva	7–5, 2–6, [11–9]
Loss	6–4	Feb 2015	ITF Port El Kantaoui, Tunisia	10,000	Hard	(Japan) Michika Ozeki	(Italy) Deborah Chiesa (Italy) Beatrice Lombardo	3–6, 2–6
Win	7–4	Apr 2015	ITF Heraklion, Greece	10,000	Hard	(Chinese Taipei) Lee Pei-chi	(Serbia) Tamara Čurović (Belarus) Aryna Sabalenka	4–6, 6–3, [10–2]
Loss	7–5	Apr 2015	ITF Heraklion, Greece	10,000	Hard	(Oman) Fatma Al-Nabhani	(Hungary) Anna Bondár (Austria) Lisa-Maria Moser	3–6, 5–7
Loss	7–6	May 2015	ITF Bhopal, India	10,000	Hard	(Chinese Taipei) Hsu Ching-wen	(India) Snehadevi Reddy (India) Dhruthi Tatachar Venugopal	6–0, 6–7^{(1)}, [3–10]
Win	8–6	Jun 2015	Fergana Challenger, Uzbekistan	25,000	Hard	(Slovenia) Tadeja Majerič	(Uzbekistan) Vlada Ekshibarova (India) Natasha Palha	7–5, 6–3
Loss	8–7	Sep 2015	ITF Hyderabad, India	10,000	Clay	(India) Prarthana Thombare	(Oman) Fatma Al-Nabhani (India) Prerna Bhambri	5–7, 2–6
Win	9–7	Sep 2015	ITF Hyderabad, India	10,000	Clay	(India) Prarthana Thombare	(India) Nidhi Chilumula (India) Rishika Sunkara	2–6, 6–3, [12–10]
Loss	9–8	Oct 2015	ITF Lucknow, India	10,000	Grass	(India) Nidhi Chilumula	(India) Prerna Bhambri (India) Prarthana Thombare	3–6, 6–4, [7–10]
Win	10–8	Oct 2015	ITF Raipur, India	10,000	Hard	(India) Prarthana Thombare	(India) Prerna Bhambri (India) Rishika Sunkara	6–3, 6–7^{(4)}, [10–8]
Win	11–8	Jul 2016	ITF Sharm El Sheikh, Egypt	10,000	Hard	(Egypt) Ola Abou Zekry	(Greece) Eleni Kordolaimi (Romania) Ana Bianca Mihăilă	2–6, 6–3, [10–5]
Win	12–8	Aug 2016	ITF Sharm El Sheikh	10,000	Hard	(Montenegro) Ana Veselinović	(Georgia (country)) Mariam Bolkvadze (Romania) Ana Bianca Mihăilă	4–6, 7–6^{(2)}, [10–8]
Win	13–8	Aug 2016	ITF Sharm El Sheikh	10,000	Hard	(India) Dhruthi Tatachar Venugopal	(Portugal) Inês Murta (United Kingdom) Mirabelle Njoze	6–3, 6–3
Loss	13–9	Sep 2016	ITF Sharm El Sheikh	10,000	Hard	(India) Dhruthi Tatachar Venugopal	(Romania) Ana Bianca Mihăilă (Egypt) Sandra Samir	4–6, 1–6
Win	14–9	Sep 2016	ITF Sharm El Sheikh	10,000	Hard	(India) Dhruthi Tatachar Venugopal	(United Kingdom) Suzy Larkin (Sweden) Linnea Malmqvist	6–1, 6–3
Win	15–9	Oct 2016	ITF Pune, India	10,000	Hard	(India) Dhruthi Tatachar Venugopal	(India) Riya Bhatia (India) Shweta Rana	6–4, 6–0
Win	16–9	Sep 2021	ITF Monastir, Tunisia	15,000	Hard	(India) Sravya Shivani Chilakalapudi	(United States) Dalayna Hewitt (Serbia) Elena Milovanović	7–5, 6–3
Loss	16–10	Dec 2021	ITF Solapur, India	15,000	Hard	(India) Sowjanya Bavisetti	(India) Ramya Natarajan (India) Sathwika Sama	3–6, 6–1, [11–13]
Loss	16–11	Feb 2022	ITF Ahmedabad, India	15,000	Clay	(India) Sravya Shivani Chilakalapudi	(Thailand) Punnin Kovapitukted (Russia) Anna Ureke	3–6, 1–6
Loss	16–12	Nov 2022	ITF Nairobi, Kenya	15,000	Clay	(United States) Sabastiani Leon	(India) Smriti Bhasin (Kenya) Angella Okutoyi	3–6, 5–7
Loss	16–13	June 2024	ITF Santo Domingo, Dominican Republic	15,000	Hard	(India) Riya Bhatia	(Canada) Raphaëlle Lacasse (Dominican Republic) Ana Carmen Zamburek	3–6, 4–6
