= 2017 XIXO Ladies Open Hódmezővásárhely – Singles =

Singles
- 2017 XIXO Ladies Open Hódmezővásárhely

Final
- Champion: (Romania) Mihaela Buzărnescu
- Runner-up: (Montenegro) Danka Kovinić
- Score: 6–2, 6–1

Events
Singles	Doubles
← 2016 ·	XIXO Ladies Open Hódmezővásárhely	· 2018 →

Tamara Zidanšek was the defending champion, but lost in the second round to Alexandra Panova.

Mihaela Buzărnescu won the title, defeating Danka Kovinić in the final, 6–2, 6–1.

== Seeds ==
1. (Romania) Ana Bogdan (first round)
2. (Montenegro) Danka Kovinić (final)
3. (Bulgaria) Viktoriya Tomova (first round)
4. (Bulgaria) Elitsa Kostova (second round)
5. (Hungary) Dalma Gálfi (quarterfinals)
6. (Turkey) Çağla Büyükakçay (first round)
7. (Slovenia) Tamara Zidanšek (second round)
8. (Austria) Barbara Haas (quarterfinals)

== Draw ==
=== Key ===
- Q = Qualifier
- WC = Wild card
- LL = Lucky loser
- Alt = Alternate
- SE = Special exempt
- PR = Protected ranking
- ITF = ITF entry
- JE = Junior exempt
- w/o = Walkover
- r = Retired
- d = Defaulted
- SR = Special ranking

=== Finals ===
Semifinals
Q	(Russia) Alexandra Panova	3	3
PR	(Romania) Mihaela Buzărnescu	6	6
WC	(Serbia) Olga Danilović	4	5
2	(Montenegro) Danka Kovinić	6	7

Final
PR	(Romania) Mihaela Buzărnescu	6	6
2	(Montenegro) Danka Kovinić	2	1

=== Top half ===
First round
1	(Romania) A Bogdan	4	3
(Romania) IM Bara	6	6
WC	(Hungary) B Békefi	1	2
(Croatia) T Mrdeža	6	6
Q	(Norway) U Eikeri	3	6^{3}
Q	(Russia) A Panova	6	7^{7}
WC	(Hungary) P Udvardy	4	4
7	(Slovenia) T Zidanšek	6	6
4	(Bulgaria) E Kostova	6	6
(Hungary) Á Bukta	0	1
(Romania) A Cadanțu	0	7	6
(Romania) N Dascălu	6	5	2
PR	(Romania) M Buzărnescu	6	6
(Switzerland) P Schnyder	3	1
(Belarus) V Lapko	5	7^{7}	7^{7}
6	(Turkey) Ç Büyükakçay	7	6^{3}	6^{5}

Second round
(Romania) IM Bara	6^{4}	3^{r}
(Croatia) T Mrdeža	7^{7}	3
Q	(Russia) A Panova	6	6
7	(Slovenia) T Zidanšek	2	0
4	(Bulgaria) E Kostova	2	2
(Romania) A Cadanțu	6	6
PR	(Romania) M Buzărnescu	6	6
(Belarus) V Lapko	3	2

Quarterfinals
(Croatia) T Mrdeža	7^{7}	1^{r}
Q	(Russia) A Panova	6^{4}	3
(Romania) A Cadanțu	2	7	3
PR	(Romania) M Buzărnescu	6	5	6

Semifinals
Q	(Russia) A Panova	3	3
PR	(Romania) M Buzărnescu	6	6

=== Bottom half ===
First round
8	(Austria) B Haas	6	6
Q	(Slovakia) V Juhászová	0	3
(Serbia) I Jorović	1	6	6
WC	(Ukraine) M Kostyuk	6	4	3
Q	(Slovakia) T Mihalíková	3	1
WC	(Serbia) O Danilović	6	6
(Slovakia) AK Schmiedlová	5	6	6
3	(Bulgaria) V Tomova	7	4	4
5	(Hungary) D Gálfi	6	6
(Serbia) J Jakšić	1	3
(Bulgaria) S Karatantcheva	3	6	6
(Brazil) T Pereira	6	3	1
(Germany) A Zaja	5	1
(Serbia) D Radanović	7	6
(Slovenia) P Hercog	1	7^{7}	5
2	(Montenegro) D Kovinić	6	6^{2}	7

Second round
8	(Austria) B Haas	6	6
(Serbia) I Jorović	3	4
WC	(Serbia) O Danilović	6^{4}	6	6
(Slovakia) AK Schmiedlová	7^{7}	0	1
5	(Hungary) D Gálfi	6	7^{7}
(Bulgaria) S Karatantcheva	3	6^{5}
(Serbia) D Radanović	2	3
2	(Montenegro) D Kovinić	6	6

Quarterfinals
8	(Austria) B Haas	0	4
WC	(Serbia) O Danilović	6	6
5	(Hungary) D Gálfi	0	3
2	(Montenegro) D Kovinić	6	6

Semifinals
WC	(Serbia) O Danilović	4	5
2	(Montenegro) D Kovinić	6	7
