= Prerna Bhambri =

Indian tennis player

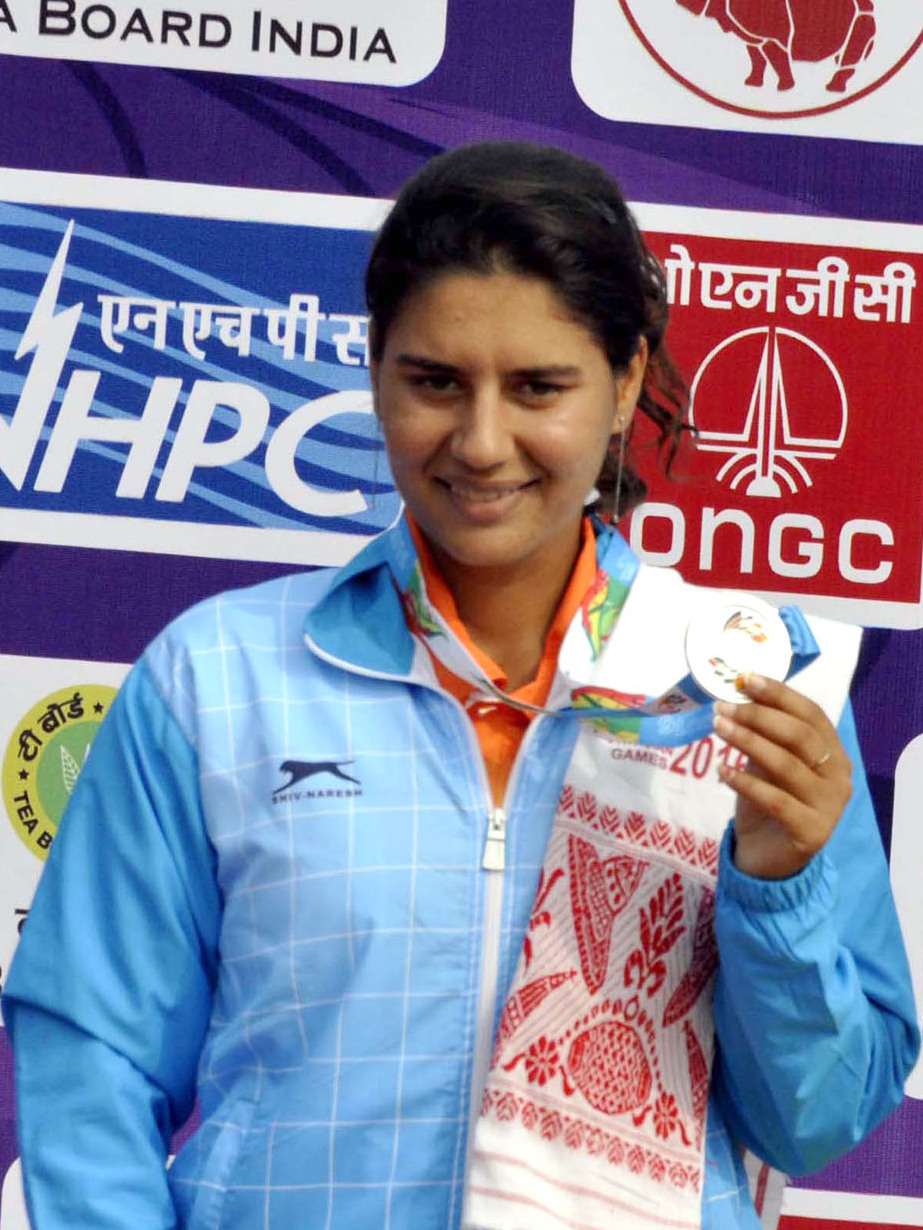
- Country (sports): India
- Born: 12 September 1992 (age 33) India
- Prize money: $48,998

Singles
- Career record: 162–118
- Career titles: 5 ITF
- Highest ranking: No. 358 (20 June 2016)

Doubles
- Career record: 63–84
- Career titles: 3 ITF
- Highest ranking: No. 430 (12 September 2016)
Medal record
Representing India
Women's tennis
South Asian Games
Gold medal – first place	2019 Kathmandu/Pokhara	Women's Doubles
Gold medal – first place	2019 Kathmandu/Pokhara	Women's team
Silver medal – second place	2016 Guwahati	Women's Singles

Prerna Bhambri (born 12 September 1992) is an Indian former tennis player. Prerna Bhambri holds the record of being the only Indian to have won the All India National Tennis Championship four times in a row, and was a runner-up in 2019. She received the Award for Excellence in Sports from Pratibha Patil, the former president of India.

== Career ==
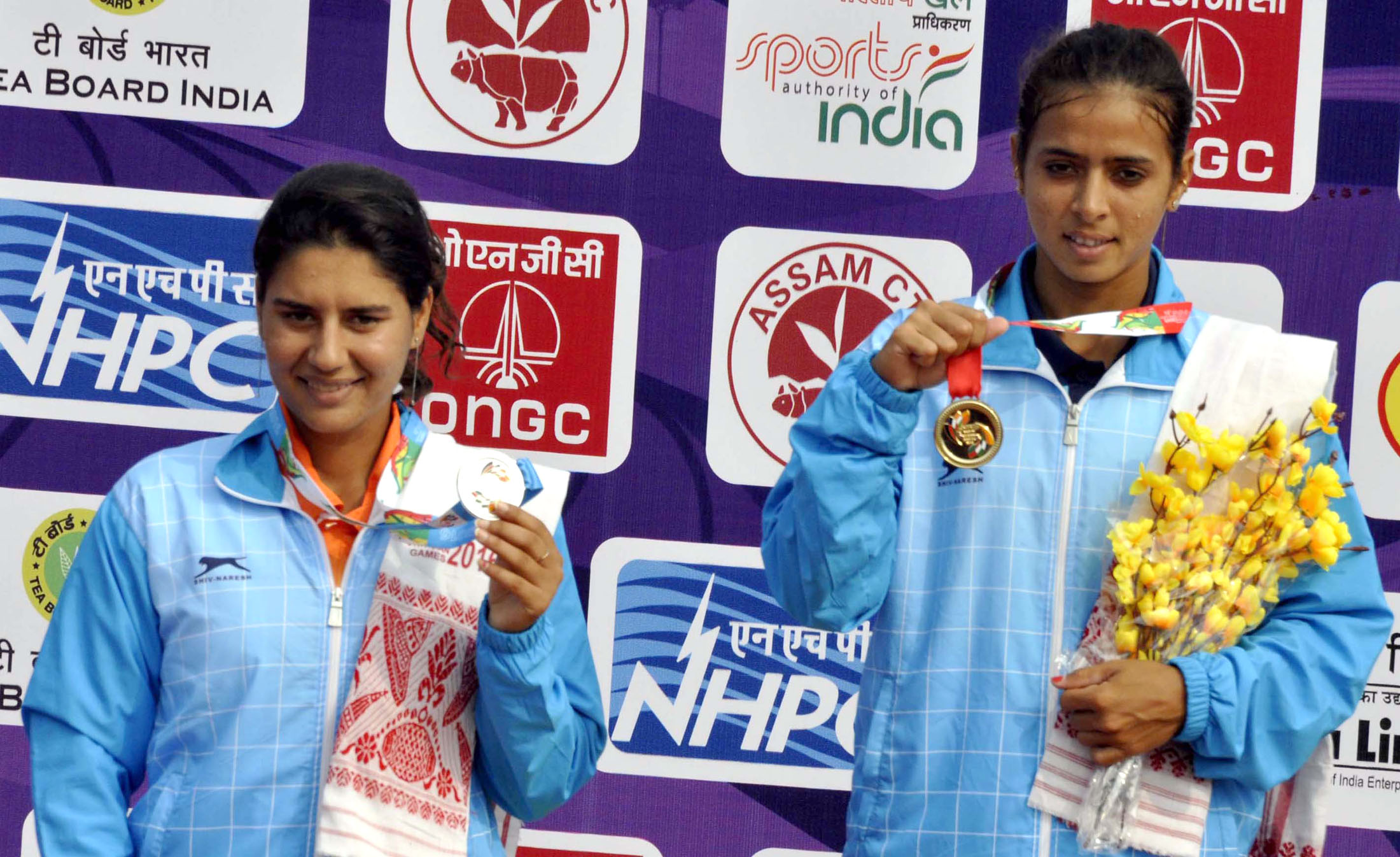
Ankita Raina won the gold medal and Prerna Bhambri (both India) the silver medal in women's singles at the 12th South Asian Games 2016 in Guwahati, on 10 February 2016

Bhambri holds the record of being the only Indian to have won the All India National Tennis Championship four times in a row.

She has a career-high singles ranking of world No. 358, achieved on 20 June 2016. Bhambri won five singles and three doubles titles on the ITF Women's Circuit.

In December 2019, Prerna won two gold medals for India at the South Asian Games. In 2016 as well, she won the silver medal in women's singles there. In 2018, she was the winner in singles and in doubles at the Delhi Olympic Games.

In January 2012, Bhambri made her debut for the India Fed Cup team. Playing for India at Fed Cup, Bhambri has a win–loss record of 5–3.

== Personal life ==
Prerna was coached by her brother Prateek Bhambri, who also was a professional tennis player. He won the All India National Championship in singles and doubles. Bhambri's cousin, Yuki Bhambri, is a professional on the ATP World Tour, with a career-high ranking of world No. 83 and doubles ranking of 18. Bhambri is also the younger cousin of Ankita Bhambri and Sanaa Bhambri, both retired players. Prerna graduated with an MBA from Jamia Millia Islamia, New Delhi. She is married to Ayush Tandon, who is a Chartered Accountant.

== Achievements ==
Year	Tournament	Position
2019	South Asian Games 2019, Nepal	Gold medal (Team event & doubles)
2019	Fenesta Tennis Championship 2019	Runner-up (singles)
2019	Asian Tennis Tour, Delhi	Runner-up (singles)
2019	All India Tennis Association tournament, Jaipur	Winner (singles)
2018	Delhi Olympic Games, Delhi	Winner(singles and doubles)
2018	Inter-State Tennis 2018	Runner-up – silver medal
2017	ITF Women $15,000 Colombo	Runner-up (singles)
2016	South Asian Games 2016	Runner-up (singles) silver medal
2016	Fed Cup- Represented India in Team India Group I, Thailand	5th position for Team India
2016	ITF Women $10,000 Egypt	Runner-up (singles)
2016	ITF Women $10,000 Egypt	Winner (doubles)
2015	Fenesta Tennis Championship 2015	National champion (singles)
2015	ITF Women US$10,000 Gulbarga (week 1)	Winner (singles) & Runner-up (doubles)
2015	ITF Women US$10,000 Gulbarga (week 2)	Winner (singles)
2015	ITF Women US$10,000 Lucknow	Winner (singles) & Winner (doubles)
2015	ITF Women $10,000 Hyderabad	Runner-up (singles) & Winner(doubles)
2015	ITF Women $15,000 Hong Kong	Qualified for main draw & Runner-up (singles)
2014	Fenesta Tennis Championship 2014	National champion (singles)
2013	Fenesta Tennis Championship 2013	National champion (singles)
2012	Fenesta Tennis Championship 2012	National champion (singles)
2012	Fed Cup - Represented India in Team India Group II, Shenzhen, China	Winner (Team India)
2012	ITF Women $10,000 Gulbarga	Winner (singles)
2011	ITF Women $10,000 Delhi	Winner (singles)
2011	34th National Games at Ranchi	Gold medal (doubles); Gold medal (Team); & Bronze medal (singles)

Winner of various tournaments in categories i.e. National Series, Championship Series, and Talent Series.

== ITF Circuit finals ==
=== Singles (5–5) ===
Legend $25,000 tournaments $15,000 tournaments $10,000 tournaments	Finals by surface Hard (4–3) Clay (0–2) Grass (1–0)

Outcome	No.	Date	Location	Surface	Opponents	Score
Winner	1.	25 June 2011	New Delhi, India	Hard	(Israel) Keren Shlomo	6–2, 6–3
Runner-up	1.	23 June 2012	New Delhi, India	Hard	(India) Ankita Raina	4–6, 2–6
Winner	2.	28 September 2012	Gulbarga, India	Hard	(China) Yang Zi	6–2, 6–2
Runner-up	2.	26 July 2015	Hong Kong	Hard	(Japan) Ayaka Okuno	4–6, 0–6
Runner-up	3.	19 September 2015	Hyderabad, India	Clay	(Oman) Fatma Al-Nabhani	4–6, 0–6
Winner	3.	24 October 2015	Lucknow, India	Grass	(India) Rishika Sunkara	6–4, 6–1
Winner	4.	21 November 2015	Gulbarga, India	Hard	(India) Riya Bhatia	4–6, 7–5, 6–4
Winner	5.	28 November 2015	Gulbarga, India	Hard	(India) Natasha Palha	6–0, 6–4
Runner-up	4.	8 May 2016	Sharm El Sheikh, Egypt	Hard	(Thailand) Noppawan Lertcheewakarn	4–6, 1–6
Runner-up	5.	14 October 2017	Colombo, Sri Lanka	Clay	(China) Ma Yexin	1–6, 2–6

=== Doubles (3–5) ===
Legend $50,000 tournaments $25,000 tournaments $10,000 tournaments	Finals by surface Hard (1–4) Clay (1–1) Grass (1–0)

Outcome	No.	Date	Location	Surface	Partner	Opponents	Score
Runner-up	1.	3 April 2015	Dehra Dun, India	Hard	(India) Rishika Sunkara	(India) Prarthana Thombare (Thailand) Nungnadda Wannasuk	0–6, 4–6
Runner-up	2.	14 September 2015	Hyderabad, India	Clay	(India) Prarthana Thombare	(India) Sowjanya Bavisetti (India) Rishika Sunkara	3–6, 4–6
Winner	1.	20 September 2015	Hyderabad, India	Clay	(Oman) Fatma Al-Nabhani	(India) Sharmada Balu (India) Prarthana Thombare	7–5, 6–2
Winner	2.	23 October 2015	Lucknow, India	Grass	(India) Prarthana Thombare	(India) Sharmada Balu (India) Nidhi Chilumula	6–3, 4–6, [10–7]
Runner-up	3.	30 October 2015	Raipur, India	Hard	(India) Rishika Sunkara	(India) Sharmada Balu (India) Prarthana Thombare	3–6, 7–6^{(7–4)}, [8–10]
Runner-up	4.	20 November 2015	Gulbarga, India	Hard	(India) Kanika Vaidya	(India) Dhruthi Tatachar Venugopal (India) Karman Thandi	6–1, 3–6, [7–10]
Winner	3.	21 May 2016	Sharm El Sheikh, Egypt	Hard	(India) Nidhi Chilumula	(Thailand) Tamachan Momkoonthod (India) Pranjala Yadlapalli	3–6, 7–5, [10–7]
Runner-up	5.	18 June 2016	Fergana, Uzbekistan	Hard	(India) Ankita Raina	(Russia) Polina Monova (Russia) Yana Sizikova	6–7^{(0–7)}, 2–6

== Fed Cup participation ==
=== Singles ===
Edition	Round	Date	Location	Against	Surface	Opponent	W/L	Score
2012 Fed Cup	Asia/Oceania Zone	30 January 2012	Shenzhen, China	Iran	Hard	(Iran) Ghazaleh Torkaman	W	6–0, 6–1
2012 Fed Cup	Asia/Oceania Zone	1 February 2012	Shenzhen, China	Turkmenistan	Hard	(Turkmenistan) Anastasiya Prenko	W	6–1, 6–3
2012 Fed Cup	Asia/Oceania Zone	3 February 2012	Shenzhen, China	Philippines	Hard	(Philippines) Anna Clarice Patrimonio	L	6–3, 4–6, 2–6

=== Doubles ===
Edition	Round	Date	Location	Against	Surface	Partner	Opponents	W/L	Score
2012 Fed Cup	Asia/Oceania Zone	31 January 2012	Shenzhen, China	Oman	Hard	(India) Isha Lakhani	(Oman) Sarah Al Balushi (Oman) Maliha Al Awaidy	W	w/o
2012 Fed Cup	Asia/Oceania Zone	1 February 2012	Shenzhen, China	Turkmenistan	Hard	(India) Isha Lakhani	(Turkmenistan) Guljan Muhammetkuliyeva (Turkmenistan) Ummarahmat Hummetova	W	6–0, 6–0
