= Natasha Palha =

Indian tennis player (born 1994)

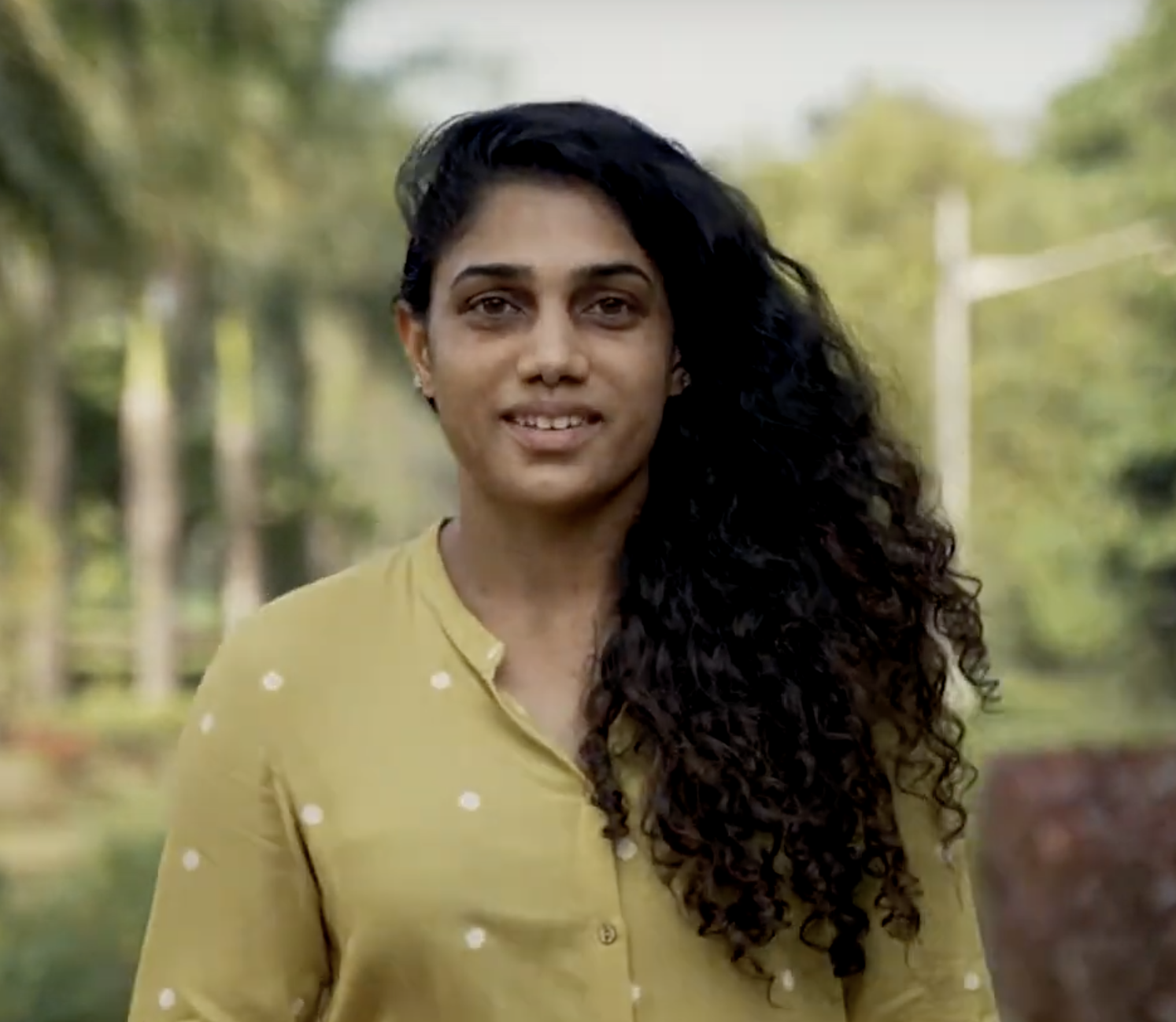
- Palha in 2022
- Born: 17 January 1994 (age 32) Goa, India
- Plays: Right (two-handed backhand)
- Prize money: $46,353

Singles
- Career record: 159–162
- Highest ranking: No. 492 (13 October 2014)

Doubles
- Career record: 100–130
- Career titles: 5 ITF
- Highest ranking: No. 418 (2 May 2016)

Team competitions
- Fed Cup: 2–0
Medal record
Representing India
Women's tennis
South Asian Games
| Silver medal – second place | 2016 Guwahati | Women's doubles |

Natasha Palha (born 17 January 1994) is an Indian former tennis player.

She was the Indian National Grass Court Tennis champion in 2014.

In her career, Palha won five doubles titles on the ITF Women's Circuit. She reached career-high WTA rankings of 492 in singles and 418 in doubles and she competed on the pro circuit until July 2019.

Playing for India Fed Cup team, Palha has a win–loss record of 2–0.

== ITF finals ==
=== Singles: 5 (5 runner-ups) ===
| Legend $25,000 tournaments $10,000 tournaments | Finals by surface Hard (0–4) Clay (0–1) |

| Result | Date | Location | Surface | Opponent | Score |
|---|---|---|---|---|---|
| Loss | 12 May 2012 | New Delhi, India | Hard | (Chinese Taipei) Lee Pei-chi | 4–6, 2–6 |
| Loss | 20 April 2013 | Chennai, India | Clay | (India) Ankita Raina | 3–6, 1–6 |
| Loss | 2 August 2014 | New Delhi, India | Hard | (Thailand) Peangtarn Plipuech | 2–6, 4–6 |
| Loss | 31 October 2015 | Raipur, India | Hard | (India) Rishika Sunkara | 5–7, 6–3, 2–6 |
| Loss | 28 November 2015 | Gulbarga, India | Hard | (India) Prerna Bhambri | 0–6, 4–6 |

=== Doubles: 14 (5 titles, 9 runner-ups) ===
| Legend $25,000 tournaments $15,000 tournaments $10,000 tournaments | Finals by surface Hard (3–5) Clay (2–3) Grass (0–1) |

| Result | No. | Date | Location | Surface | Partner | Opponents | Score |
|---|---|---|---|---|---|---|---|
| Loss | 1. | 6 May 2011 | Hyderabad, India | Clay | (India) Sowjanya Bavisetti | (South Korea) Lee So-ra (South Korea) Han Na-lae | 3–6, 2–6 |
| Win | 1. | 22 March 2013 | Hyderabad, India | Hard | (India) Prarthana Thombare | (India) Sharmada Balu (India) Sowjanya Bavisetti | 6–1, 6–4 |
| Win | 2. | 19 April 2013 | Chennai, India | Clay | (India) Prarthana Thombare | (India) Rushmi Chakravarthi (India) Ankita Raina | 5–7, 6–3, [10–6] |
| Loss | 2. | 26 April 2013 | Lucknow, India | Grass | (India) Prarthana Thombare | (India) Nidhi Chilumula (Japan) Emi Mutaguchi | 4–6, 6–7^{(4–7)} |
| Loss | 3. | 28 June 2013 | New Delhi, India | Hard | (India) Prarthana Thombare | (India) Rishika Sunkara (Hungary) Naomi Totka | 4–6, 6–4, [11–13] |
| Loss | 4. | 12 October 2013 | Sharm El Sheikh, Egypt | Hard | (Brazil) Karina Venditti | (Russia) Anna Morgina (Russia) Yana Sizikova | 3–6, 2–6 |
| Win | 3. | 8 February 2014 | Sharm El Sheikh | Hard | (China) Gai Ao | (Slovakia) Dagmara Bašková (Netherlands) Janneke Wikkerink | 6–4, 6–1 |
| Loss | 5. | 15 March 2014 | Sharm El Sheikh | Hard | (Bosnia and Herzegovina) Dea Herdželaš | (Serbia) Nina Stojanović (Montenegro) Ana Veselinović | 0–6, 6–4, [6–10] |
| Loss | 6. | 11 April 2014 | Chennai, India | Clay | (India) Prarthana Thombare | (India) Rishika Sunkara (India) Sharmada Balu | 0–6, 6–7^{(4–7)} |
| Loss | 7. | 9 August 2014 | Bangalore, India | Hard | (Chinese Taipei) Hsu Ching-wen | (India) Sharmada Balu (India) Prarthana Thombare | 4–6, 6–0, [6–10] |
| Loss | 8. | 20 June 2015 | Fergana, Uzbekistan | Hard | (Uzbekistan) Vlada Ekshibarova | (India) Sharmada Balu (Slovenia) Tadeja Majerič | 5–7, 3–6 |
| Win | 4. | 4 February 2017 | Cairo, Egypt | Clay | (India) Rishika Sunkara | (Egypt) Sandra Samir (United States) Shelby Talcott | 6–2, 6–1 |
| Win | 5. | 3 March 2017 | Gwalior, India | Hard | (India) Rishika Sunkara | (India) Riya Bhatia (India) Shweta Chandra Rana | 6–4, 6–2 |
| Loss | 9. | 21 October 2017 | Colombo, Sri Lanka | Clay | (India) Rishika Sunkara | (India) Rutuja Bhosale (India) Pranjala Yadlapalli | 4–6, 1–6 |
