= Rishika Sunkara =

Indian tennis player

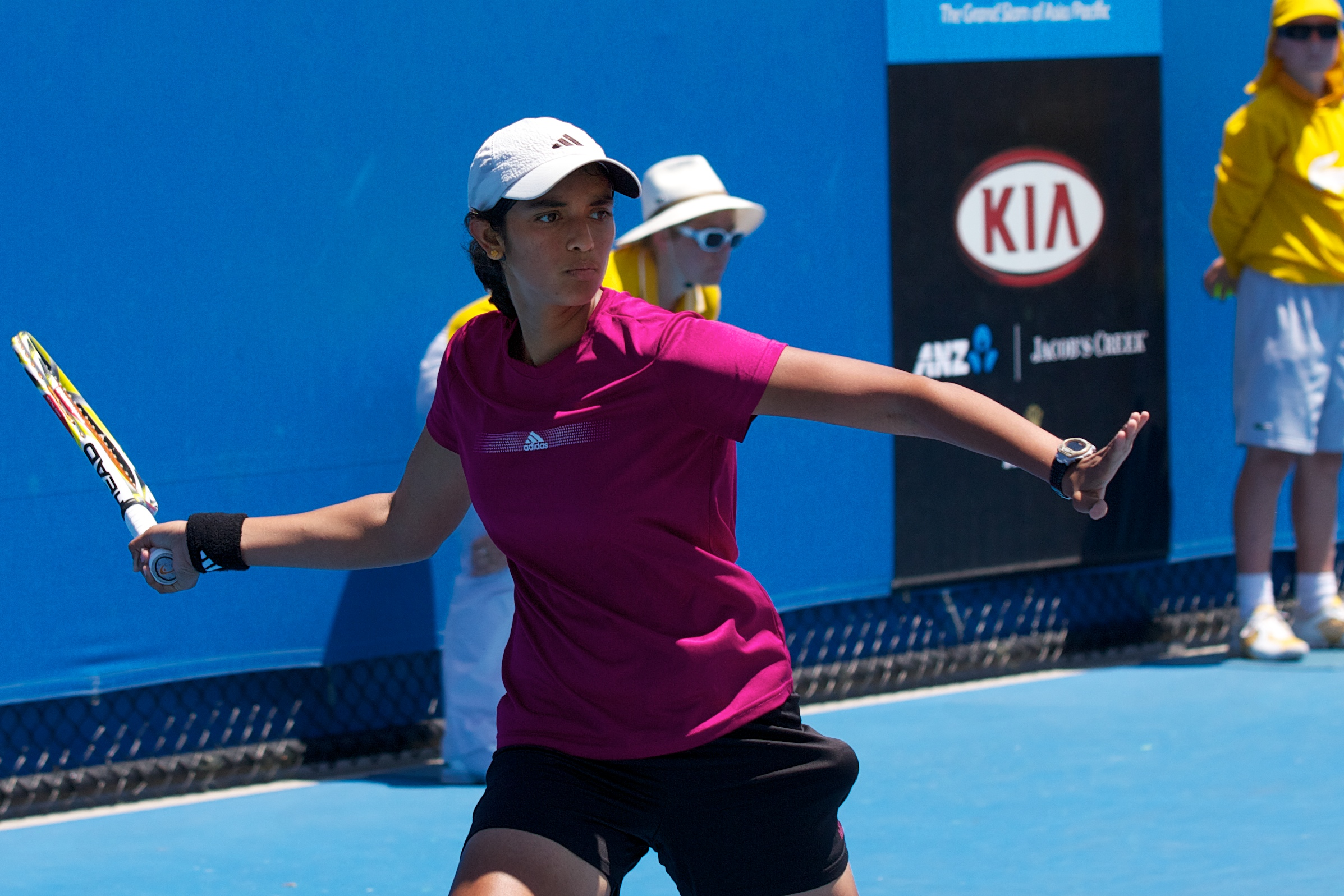
- At the 2011 Australian Open
- Country (sports): India
- Residence: New Delhi, India
- Born: 14 May 1993 (age 32) Vijayawada, India
- Plays: Right (two-handed backhand)
- Prize money: $49,998

Singles
- Career record: 162–143
- Career titles: 2 ITF
- Highest ranking: No. 441 (9 November 2015)

Doubles
- Career record: 151–125
- Career titles: 10 ITF
- Highest ranking: No. 375 (5 August 2013)

Team competitions
- Fed Cup: 2–4
Medal record
Representing India
Women's tennis
South Asian Games
Silver medal – second place	2016 Guwahati	Women's Doubles

Rishika Sunkara (born 14 May 1993) is an Indian former tennis player.

In her career, she won 12 titles on the ITF Circuit; two in singles and ten in doubles (four in 2015 of which three were won with Sowjanya Bavisetti). On 9 November 2015, she reached her career-high singles ranking of world No. 441. On 5 August 2013, she peaked at No. 375 in the doubles rankings.

She competed for the India Fed Cup team in 2013 and 2014. Rishika has a rare distinction of being the junior and pro number one in India while still being a teenager.

Playing for India in Fed Cup, Sunkara scored a win–loss record of 2–4.

== Early career ==
Rishika Sunkara was born on 14 May 1993 in Vijayawada, Andhra Pradesh. She has an elder brother who used to play tennis, and she started playing tennis at the age of six. One of her earliest coaches was Mahesh Kumbria in Cosmic.

Rishika Sunkara teamed up with Sai Samhitha for doubles final in National Hard Court Tennis, in 2021.

Sunkara was part of the Team Tennis Academy under coach Aditya Sachdev for nine years till the split in 2016. She has been coached by Anantha Bhaskar. and sponsored by Head. Previously, she was supported by GVK and Adidas.

== ITF Circuit finals ==
Legend
$25,000 tournaments
$15,000 tournaments
$10,000 tournaments

=== Singles: 6 (2 titles, 4 runner-ups) ===
Result	No.	Date	Tournament	Surface	Opponent	Score
Win	1.	May 2012	ITF New Delhi, India	Hard	(India) Simran Kaur Sethi	6–2, 6–4
Loss	2.	Dec 2012	ITF Kolkata, India	Hard	(Hong Kong) Katherine Ip	6–2, 3–6, 3–6
Loss	3.	May 2014	ITF Hyderabad, India	Hard	(India) Prarthana Thombare	7–6^{(7–4)}, 4–6, 3–6
Loss	4.	Sep 2015	ITF Hyderabad, India	Clay	(Oman) Fatma Al-Nabhani	3–6, 1–6
Loss	5.	Oct 2015	ITF Lucknow, India	Grass	(India) Prerna Bhambri	4–6, 1–6
Win	6.	Oct 2015	ITF Raipur, India	Hard	(India) Natasha Palha	7–5, 3–6, 6–2

=== Doubles: 23 (10 titles, 13 runner-ups) ===
Result	No.	Date	Location	Surface	Partner	Opponents	Score
Loss	1.	14 August 2009	New Delhi, India	Hard	(India) Nova Patel	(India) Sanaa Bhambri (India) Poojashree Venkatesha	2–6, 1–6
Win	1.	6 October 2012	Bidar, India	Hard	(Ukraine) Oleksandra Korashvili	(Thailand) Nungnadda Wannasuk (China) Zhang Nannan	6–4, 7–5
Loss	2.	1 December 2012	Kolkata, India	Hard	(India) Rutuja Bhosale	(India) Arantxa Andrady (India) Kyra Shroff	4–6, 4–6
Win	2.	28 June 2013	New Delhi, India	Hard	(Hungary) Naomi Totka	(India) Natasha Palha (India) Prarthana Thombare	6–4, 4–6, [13–11]
Loss	3.	28 July 2013	Sharm El Sheikh, Egypt	Hard	(India) Sowjanya Bavisetti	(Egypt) Mayar Sherif (Slovakia) Zuzana Zlochová	5–7, 3–6
Loss	4.	10 January 2014	Aurangabat, India	Clay	(India) Shweta Rana	(India) Ankita Raina (India) Prarthana Thombare	3–6, 3–6
Win	3.	11 April 2014	Chennai, India	Clay	(India) Sharmada Balu	(India) Natasha Palha (India) Prarthana Thombare	6–0, 7–6
Win	4.	9 May 2014	Hyderabad, India	Hard	(India) Sharmada Balu	(India) Shweta Rana (India) Prarthana Thombare	6–1, 7–5
Loss	5.	30 August 2014	Sharm El Sheikh, Egypt	Hard	(Italy) Giulia Bruzzone	(Russia) Anna Morgina (South Africa) Michelle Sammons	2–6, 1–6
Loss	6.	6 September 2014	Sharm El Sheikh, Egypt	Hard	(China) Gai Ao	(South Africa) Ilze Hattingh (South Africa) Michelle Sammons	3–6, 5–7
Loss	7.	3 April 2015	Dehra Dun, India	Hard	(India) Prerna Bhambri	(India) Prarthana Thombare (Thailand) Nungnadda Wannasuk	0–6, 4–6
Win	5.	15 May 2015	Nashik, India	Clay	(India) Sowjanya Bavisetti	(India) Riya Bhatia (India) Karman Thandi	7–6^{(7–5)}, 6–2
Win	6.	20 June 2015	Sharm El Sheikh, Egypt	Hard	(Netherlands) Eva Wacanno	(Spain) Olga Parres Azcoitia (India) Prarthana Thombare	6–1, 6–1
Win	7.	22 August 2015	Sharm El Sheikh, Egypt	Hard	(India) Sowjanya Bavisetti	(United States) Eva Siska (United States) Shelby Talcott	6–1, 6–1
Win	8.	14 September 2015	Hyderabad, India	Clay	(India) Sowjanya Bavisetti	(India) Prerna Bhambri (India) Prarthana Thombare	6–3, 6–4
Loss	8.	25 September 2015	Hyderabad, India	Hard	(India) Nidhi Chilumula	(India) Sharmada Balu (India) Prarthana Thombare	6–2, 3–6, [10–12]
Loss	9.	30 October 2015	Raipur, India	Hard	(India) Prerna Bhambri	(India) Sharmada Balu (India) Prarthana Thombare	3–6, 7–6^{(7–4)}, [8–10]
Loss	10.	7 May 2016	Sharm El Sheikh, Egypt	Hard	(India) Nidhi Chilumula	(United Kingdom) Samantha Murray (Greece) Despina Papamichail	6–3, 2–6, [1–10]
Loss	11.	11 November 2016	Pune, India	Hard	(India) Sowjanya Bavisetti	(Russia) Irina Khromacheva (Bulgaria) Aleksandrina Naydenova	2–6, 1–6
Win	9.	4 February 2017	Cairo, Egypt	Clay	(India) Natasha Palha	(Egypt) Sandra Samir (United States) Shelby Talcott	6–2, 6–1
Win	10.	3 March 2017	Gwalior, India	Hard	(India) Natasha Palha	(India) Riya Bhatia (India) Shweta Rana	6–4, 6–2
Loss	12.	6 May 2017	Cairo, Egypt	Clay	(India) Sowjanya Bavisetti	(Colombia) María Herazo González (Belgium) Magali Kempen	1–6, 2–6
Loss	13.	21 October 2017	Colombo, Sri Lanka	Clay	(India) Natasha Palha	(India) Rutuja Bhosale (India) Pranjala Yadlapalli	4–6, 1–6
