= Sowjanya Bavisetti =

Indian tennis player

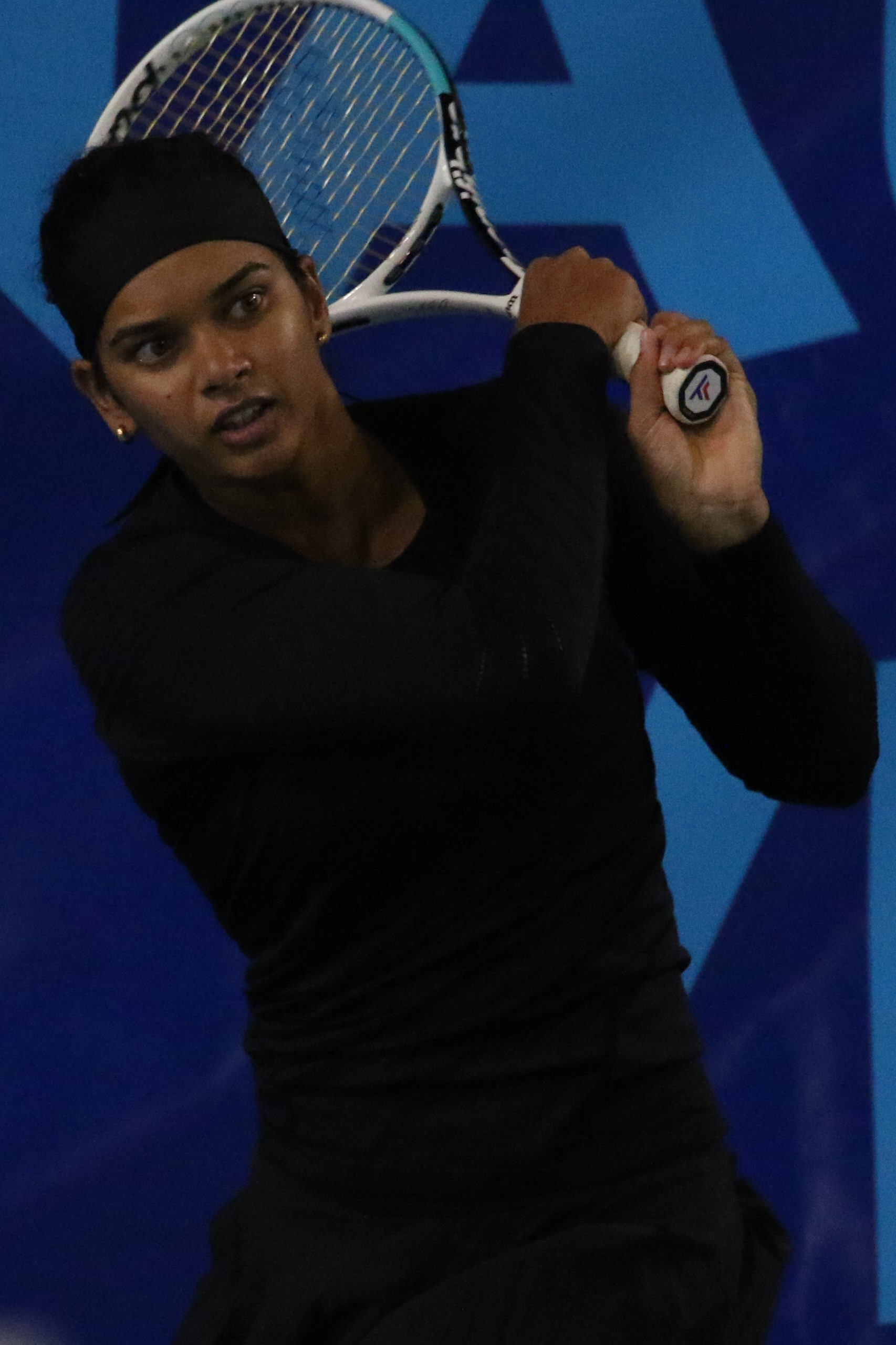
- Bavisetti at the 2021 ITF Poitiers
- Country (sports): India
- Born: 11 December 1993 (age 32) Hyderabad, Telangana, India
- Plays: Left-handed (two-handed backhand)
- Prize money: $62,714

Singles
- Career record: 167–179
- Career titles: 3 ITF
- Highest ranking: No. 500 (3 October 2022)

Doubles
- Career record: 129–116
- Career titles: 9 ITF
- Highest ranking: No. 402 (24 February 2014)

Team competitions
- Fed Cup: 1–6
Medal record
Representing India
Women's tennis
South Asian Games
Gold medal – first place	2019 Kathmandu/Pokhara	Mixed doubles
Gold medal – first place	2019 Kathmandu/Pokhara	Women's team
Silver medal – second place	2019 Kathmandu/Pokhara	Women's singles

Sowjanya Bavisetti (born 11 December 1993) is an Indian inactive tennis player.

Bavisetti has a career-high singles ranking by the WTA of 500, reached on 3 October 2022. She also has a career-high WTA doubles ranking of 402, achieved on 24 February 2014. Bavisetti has won three singles titles and nine doubles titles in tournaments of the ITF Circuit.

Representing India in the Fed Cup since 2020 in seven ties, she has a career win-loss record of 1–6.

== ITF Circuit finals ==
Legend
$25,000 tournaments
$15,000 tournaments
$10,000 tournaments

=== Singles (3–3) ===
Result	W–L	Date	Tournament	Surface	Opponent	Score
Win	1–0	11 August 2013	ITF Sharm El Sheikh, Egypt	Hard	(Ukraine) Anastasia Kharchenko	6–1, 7–6
Win	2–0	12 January 2014	ITF Aurangabad, India	Clay	(India) Prarthana Thombare	5–7, 6–4, 6–4
Loss	2–1	24 May 2015	ITF Bhopal, India	Hard	(India) Sharmada Balu	2–6, 3–6
Loss	2–2	21 June 2015	ITF Anning, China	Clay	(China) You Xiaodi	5–7, 3–6
Win	3–2	30 October 2016	Pune Open, India	Hard	(India) Mihika Yadav	7–5, 6–2
Loss	3–3	5 December 2021	ITF Bengaluru, India	Hard	(India) Pranjala Yadlapalli	0–6, 3–6

=== Doubles (9–11) ===
Outcome	W–L	Date	Tournament	Surface	Partner	Opponents	Score
Loss	0–1	6 May 2011	ITF Hyderabad, India	Clay	(India) Natasha Palha	(South Korea) Lee So-ra (South Korea) Han Na-lae	3–6, 2–6
Win	1–1	17 March 2013	ITF Hyderabad, India	Hard	(India) Sharmada Balu	(Germany) Michaela Frlicka (Czech Republic) Tereza Malíková	7–5, 5–7, [10–8]
Loss	1–2	22 March 2013	ITF Hyderabad, India	Hard	(India) Sharmada Balu	(India) Natasha Palha (India) Prarthana Thombare	1–6, 4–6
Win	2–2	15 June 2013	ITF Sharm El Sheikh, Egypt	Hard	(Russia) Anna Morgina	(Slovenia) Dalila Jakupović (India) Kyra Shroff	6–1, 3–6, [10–6]
Win	3–2	21 July 2013	ITF New Delhi, India	Hard	(India) Sharmada Balu	(India) Ankita Raina (India) Shweta Chandra Rana	6-2, 6-4
Loss	3–3	28 July 2013	ITF Sharm El Sheikh, Egypt	Hard	(India) Rishika Sunkara	(Egypt) Mayar Sherif (Slovakia) Zuzana Zlochová	5–7, 3–6
Loss	3–4	1 November 2013	ITF Benicarló, Spain	Clay	(China) Zhu Aiwen	(Argentina) Tatiana Búa (Spain) Lucía Cervera Vázquez	3–6, 0–6
Loss	3–5	8 November 2013	ITF Vinaròs, Spain	Clay	(China) Zhu Aiwen	(Argentina) Tatiana Búa (Spain) Lucía Cervera Vázquez	3–6, 2–6
Loss	3–6	15 November 2013	ITF Saint Jordi, Spain	Hard	(Spain) Lucía Cervera Vázquez	(Portugal) Bárbara Luz (Spain) Nuria Párrizas Díaz	5–7, 4–6
Win	4–6	15 May 2015	ITF Nashik, India	Clay	(India) Rishika Sunkara	(India) Riya Bhatia (India) Karman Thandi	7–6^{(5)}, 6–2
Win	5–6	14 June 2015	ITF Anning, China	Clay	(China) Zhu Aiwen	(China) Gai Ao (China) Sheng Yuqi	7–6, 0–6, [10–7]
Win	6–6	22 August 2015	ITF Sharm El Sheikh, Egypt	Hard	(India) Rishika Sunkara	(United States) Eva Siska (United States) Shelby Talcott	6–1, 6–1
Win	7–6	14 September 2015	ITF Hyderabad, India	Clay	(India) Rishika Sunkara	(India) Prerna Bhambri (India) Prarthana Thombare	6–3, 6–4
Loss	7–7	11 November 2016	Pune Open, India	Hard	(India) Rishika Sunkara	(Russia) Irina Khromacheva (Bulgaria) Aleksandrina Naydenova	2–6, 1–6
Loss	7–8	6 May 2017	ITF Cairo, Egypt	Clay	(India) Rishika Sunkara	(Colombia) María Herazo González (Belgium) Magali Kempen	1–6, 2–6
Win	8–8	23 September 2018	ITF Anning, China	Clay	(China) Wang Danni	(Chinese Taipei) Cho I-hsuan (Chinese Taipei) Cho Yi-tsen	7–6, 7–5
Loss	8–9	4 August 2019	ITF Tabarka, Tunisia	Clay	(India) Shivani Chilakalapudi	(Netherlands) Eva Vedder (Netherlands) Stéphanie Visscher	2–6, 2–6
Loss	8–10	7 March 2021	ITF New Delhi, India	Hard	(India) Prarthana Thombare	(Slovenia) Pia Lovrič (Hungary) Adrienn Nagy	2–6, 3–6
Win	9–10	4 December 2021	ITF Bengaluru, India	Hard	(India) Rutuja Bhosale	(India) Vaidehi Chaudhari (India) Mihika Yadav	6–0, 6–3
Loss	9–11	11 December 2021	ITF Solapur, India	Hard	(India) Sharmada Balu	(India) Ramya Natarajan (India) Sathwika Sama	3–6, 6–1, [11–13]
