= Tennis at the 2016 South Asian Games =

Tennis at the 2016 South Asian Games were held in Guwahati, India from 10 to 15 February 2016.

== Medalists ==
Event	Gold	Silver	Bronze
Men's singles	(India) Ramkumar Ramanathan	(India) Saketh Myneni	(Pakistan) Aisam Qureshi
Men's singles	(India) Ramkumar Ramanathan	(India) Saketh Myneni	(Sri Lanka) Sharmal Dissanyake
Men's doubles	(India) Ramkumar Ramanathan (India) Vijay Sundar Prashanth	(India) Divij Sharan (India) Sanam Singh	(Sri Lanka) Dineshkanthan Thangarajah (Sri Lanka) Yasitha de Silva
Men's doubles	(India) Ramkumar Ramanathan (India) Vijay Sundar Prashanth	(India) Divij Sharan (India) Sanam Singh	(Sri Lanka) Sharmal Dissanyake (Sri Lanka) Harshana Godamanna
Women's singles	(India) Ankita Raina	(India) Prerna Bhambri	(Pakistan) Sara Mansoor
Women's singles	(India) Ankita Raina	(India) Prerna Bhambri	(Pakistan) Ushna Suhail
Women's doubles	(India) Sharmada Balu (India) Prarthana Thombare	(India) Rishika Sunkara (India) Natasha Palha	(Sri Lanka) Amritha Muttiah (Sri Lanka) Medhira Samarasinghe
Women's doubles	(India) Sharmada Balu (India) Prarthana Thombare	(India) Rishika Sunkara (India) Natasha Palha	(Sri Lanka) Thisuri Molligoda (Sri Lanka) Nethmie Waduge
Mixed doubles	(India) Divij Sharan (India) Ankita Raina	(India) Sanam Singh (India) Prarthana Thombare	(Sri Lanka) Harshana Godamanna (Sri Lanka) Amritha Muttiah
Mixed doubles	(India) Divij Sharan (India) Ankita Raina	(India) Sanam Singh (India) Prarthana Thombare	(Pakistan) Aisam Qureshi (Pakistan) Ushna Suhail

== Medal table ==
Rank	Nation	Gold	Silver	Bronze	Total
1	India (IND)	5	5	0	10
2	Sri Lanka (SRI)	0	0	6	6
3	Pakistan (PAK)	0	0	4	4
Totals (3 entries)		5	5	10	20
