= 2017 XIXO Ladies Open Hódmezővásárhely – Doubles =

Doubles
- 2017 XIXO Ladies Open Hódmezővásárhely

Final
- Champion: (Japan) Kotomi Takahata (India) Prarthana Thombare
- Runner-up: (Norway) Ulrikke Eikeri (Croatia) Tereza Mrdeža
- Score: 1–0, retired

Events
Singles	Doubles
← 2016 ·	XIXO Ladies Open Hódmezővásárhely	· 2018 →

Laura Pigossi and Nadia Podoroska were the defending champions, but both players chose not to participate.

Kotomi Takahata and Prarthana Thombare won the title after Ulrikke Eikeri and Tereza Mrdeža retired in the final at 1–0.

== Seeds ==
1. (Japan) Kotomi Takahata / (India) Prarthana Thombare (champions)
2. (Romania) Irina Maria Bara / (Romania) Mihaela Buzărnescu (semifinals, retired)
3. (Belarus) Vera Lapko / (Slovakia) Chantal Škamlová (first round)
4. (Hungary) Ágnes Bukta / (Slovakia) Vivien Juhászová (quarterfinals)

== Draw ==
=== Key ===
- Q = Qualifier
- WC = Wild card
- LL = Lucky loser
- Alt = Alternate
- SE = Special exempt
- PR = Protected ranking
- ITF = ITF entry
- JE = Junior exempt
- w/o = Walkover
- r = Retired
- d = Defaulted
- SR = Special ranking

First round
(Poland) D Ewa (Israel) E Masuri	1	0
(Hungary) V Csurgó (Hungary) A Nagy	6	6
4	(Hungary) Á Bukta (Slovakia) V Juhászová	7^{7}	6
(Romania) N Dascălu (Egypt) S Samir	6^{4}	4
(Serbia) O Danilović (Hungary) P Udvardy	6^{4}	6	[10]
(Hungary) D Gálfi (Slovenia) T Zidanšek	7^{7}	2	[6]
(Romania) SM Farzat (Romania) P Zeriu	0	1
(Norway) U Eikeri (Croatia) T Mrdeža	6	6
(Serbia) J Jakšić (Bulgaria) E Kostova	6	6
3	(Belarus) V Lapko (Slovakia) C Škamlová	3	4
(Serbia) B Bonić (Serbia) I Jorović	6	6
(Argentina) V Bosio (Serbia) N Kostić	3	1

Quarterfinals
1	(Japan) K Takahata (India) P Thombare	6^{7}	7^{9}	[10]
(Hungary) V Csurgó (Hungary) A Nagy	7^{9}	6^{7}	[7]
4	(Hungary) Á Bukta (Slovakia) V Juhászová	4	6	[8]
(Serbia) O Danilović (Hungary) P Udvardy	6	3	[10]
(Norway) U Eikeri (Croatia) T Mrdeža	6	3	[10]
(Serbia) J Jakšić (Bulgaria) E Kostova	1	6	[5]
(Serbia) B Bonić (Serbia) I Jorović	6	1	[7]
2	(Romania) IM Bara (Romania) M Buzărnescu	4	6	[10]

Semifinals
1	(Japan) K Takahata (India) P Thombare	6	6
(Serbia) O Danilović (Hungary) P Udvardy	4	3
(Norway) U Eikeri (Croatia) T Mrdeža	1
2	(Romania) IM Bara (Romania) M Buzărnescu	0^{r}

Final
1	(Japan) K Takahata (India) P Thombare	1
(Norway) U Eikeri (Croatia) T Mrdeža	0^{r}
