= Venkateswara Rao Yadlapalli =

Agriculturalist from India

Venkateswara Rao Yadlapalli is an agriculturalist from Andhra Pradesh, India. In 2019, he was conferred the Padma Shri award by the President of India for his contributions towards organic farming. He honored his Padma Shri award to the farmers.

== Life ==
Yadlapalli was born in the Guntur district of Andhra Pradesh. He has been involved in agriculture since his younger days, and continued to work for the development of agriculture and horticulture. To impart education and awareness about various farming methods, he launched three magazines: Rythunestham (2005), Pasunestham (2012), and Prakruthi Nestham (2014). He created the Rythunestham Puraskaram awards to motivate and encourage farmers and the Rythu Nestham Foundation (2016) to teach natural and organic farming methods.

In 2019, he was conferred the Padma Shri award by the President of India for his contributions towards organic farming.
