= Pranjala Yadlapalli =

Indian tennis player

- Country (sports): India
- Residence: Hyderabad
- Born: 30 March 1999 (age 27) Guntur, India
- Plays: Righ (two-handed backhand)
- Prize money: $51,375

Singles
- Career record: 115–76
- Career titles: 4 ITF
- Highest ranking: No. 265 (13 May 2019)

Doubles
- Career record: 65–39
- Career titles: 6 ITF
- Highest ranking: No. 232 (20 August 2018)
- Current ranking: No. 1301 (27 July 2026)
- Last updated on: 4 August 2026.

Pranjala Yadlapalli (born 30 March 1999) is an Indian inactive tennis player. On 13 May 2019, she achieved a career-high singles ranking of world No. 265. On 20 August 2018, she peaked at No. 232 in the doubles rankings. Yadlapalli has won four singles titles and six doubles titles on the ITF Women's Circuit.

On the ITF Junior Circuit, she reached a career-high combined ranking of 15, on 4 January 2016.

Yadlapalli made her debut for India Fed Cup team in 2018, and has played her single match in Fed Cup competition.

== ITF Circuit finals ==
Legend
$25,000 tournaments
$15,000 tournaments
$10,000 tournaments

=== Singles: 6 (4 titles, 2 runner-ups) ===
Result	W–L	Date	Tournament	Tier	Surface	Opponent	Score
Win	1–0	Jul 2017	ITF Sharm El Sheikh, Egypt	15,000	Hard	(Italy) Giada Clerici	6–7^{(0)}, 7–5, 6–4
Loss	1–1	Oct 2017	ITF Colombo, Sri Lanka	15,000	Clay	(Kazakhstan) Gozal Ainitdinova	5–7, 4–6
Win	2–1	Oct 2018	Lagos Open, Nigeria	25,000	Hard	(Switzerland) Conny Perrin	2–6, 7–5, 6–0
Win	3–1	Oct 2018	Lagos Open, Nigeria	25,000	Hard	(Switzerland) Conny Perrin	6–1, 7–6^{(2)}
Loss	3–2	Apr 2019	ITF Andijan, Uzbekistan	25,000	Hard	(Russia) Kamilla Rakhimova	6–0, 1–6, 3–6
Win	4–2	Dec 2021	ITF Bangalore, India	15,000	Hard	(India) Sowjanya Bavisetti	7–5, 6–2

=== Doubles: 13 (6 titles, 7 runner-ups) ===
Result	W–L	Date	Tournament	Surface	Partner	Opponents	Score
Loss	0–1	May 2016	ITF Sharm El Sheikh, Egypt	Hard	(Thailand) Tamachan Momkoonthod	(India) Prerna Bhambri (India) Nidhi Chilumula	6–3, 5–7, [7–10]
Win	1–1	Jun 2017	ITF Aurangabad, India	Hard	(China) Zhao Xiaoxi	(India) Rutuja Bhosale (India) Kanika Vaidya	2–6, 6–3, [10–4]
Loss	1–2	Aug 2017	ITF Nonthaburi, Thailand	Hard	(Thailand) Tamachan Momkoonthod	(Indonesia) Beatrice Gumulya (Indonesia) Jessy Rompies	0–6, 6–7^{(5)}
Win	2–2	Sep 2017	ITF Hua Hin, Thailand	Hard	(India) Zeel Desai	(India) Rutuja Bhosale (Australia) Alexandra Walters	6–2, 7–5
Win	3–2	Oct 2017	ITF Colombo, Sri Lanka	Clay	(India) Rutuja Bhosale	(India) Natasha Palha (India) Rishika Sunkara	6–4, 6–1
Win	4–2	Dec 2017	ITF Solapur, India	Hard	(Chinese Taipei) Hsu Ching-wen	(United States) Maya Jansen (New Zealand) Erin Routliffe	7–5, 1–6, [10–6]
Loss	4–3	Dec 2017	ITF Navi Mumbai, India	Hard	(Slovenia) Tamara Zidanšek	(Spain) Georgina García Pérez (Latvia) Diāna Marcinkēviča	0–6, 1–6
Loss	4–4	Feb 2018	ITF Sharm El Sheikh, Egypt	Hard	(Chinese Taipei) Lee Pei-chi	(Italy) Martina Colmegna (Russia) Valeriya Solovyeva	2–6, 3–6
Loss	4–5	Apr 2018	ITF Shymkent, Kazakhstan	Clay	(India) Kyra Shroff	(Russia) Daria Kruzhkova (Russia) Valeriya Pogrebnyak	3–6, 7–5, [5–10]
Loss	4–6	May 2018	ITF Les Franqueses del Vallès, Spain	Hard	(Romania) Raluca Șerban	(Mexico) Giuliana Olmos (Brazil) Laura Pigossi	4–6, 4–6
Loss	4–7	Jun 2018	ITF Hong Kong	Hard	(France) Victoria Muntean	(Chinese Taipei) Lee Pei-chi (Indonesia) Jessy Rompies	3–6, 4–6
Win	5–7	Jul 2018	ITF Nonthaburi, Thailand	Hard	(India) Rutuja Bhosale	(Chinese Taipei) Chen Pei-hsuan (Chinese Taipei) Wu Fang-hsien	7–5, 6–2
Win	6–7	Aug 2018	ITF Nonthaburi, Thailand	Hard	(India) Rutuja Bhosale	(Australia) Naiktha Bains (Czech Republic) Barbora Štefková	2–6, 6–0, [10–6]

Preceded by (United States) CiCi Bellis / (Czech Republic) Markéta Vondroušová	Orange Bowl Girls' Doubles Champion; 2015; With: (Slovenia) Tamara Zidanšek	Succeeded by (Serbia) Olga Danilović / (Russia) Anastasia Potapova
