= Prarthana Thombare =

Indian tennis player (born 1994)

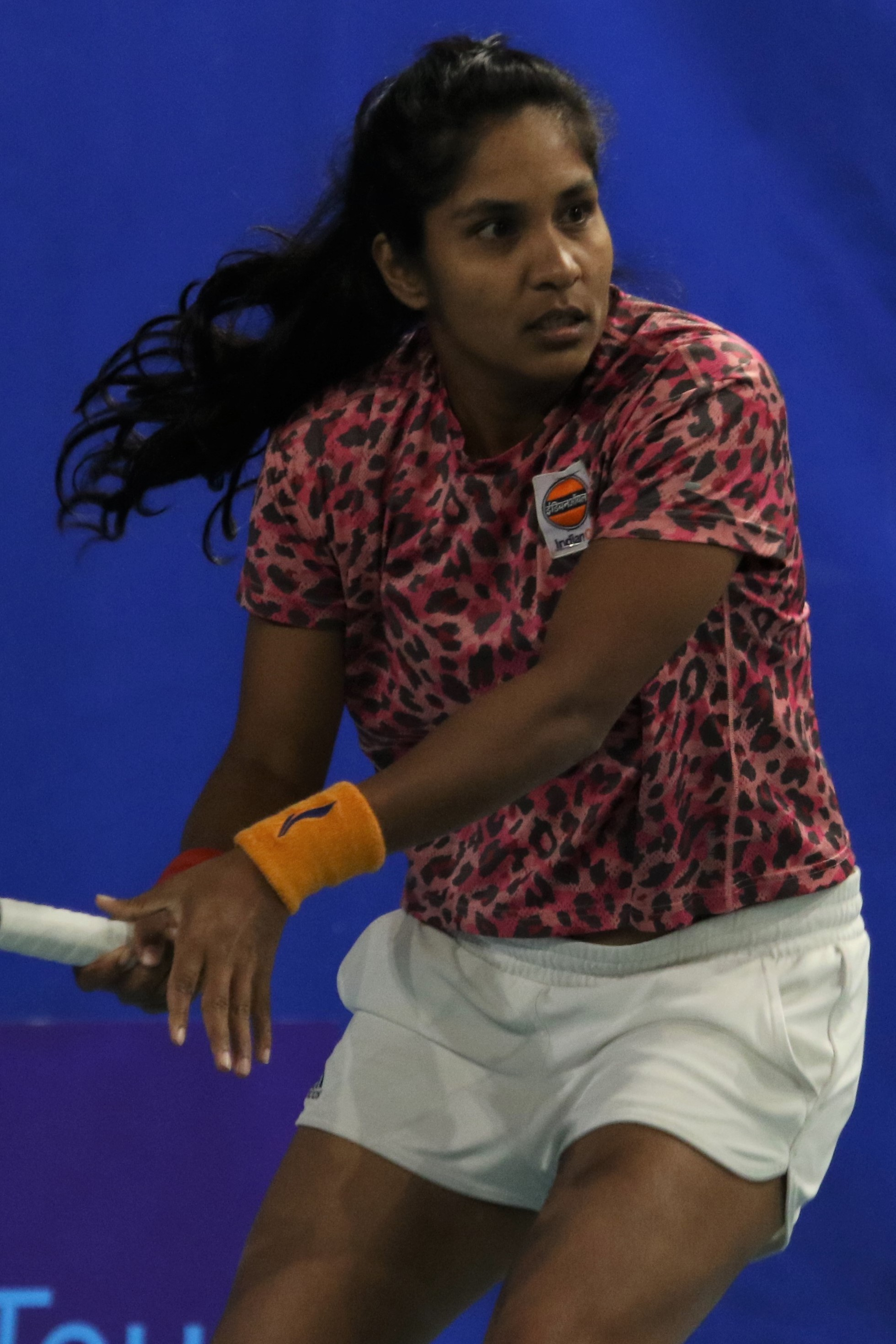
- Full name: Prarthana Gulabrao Thombare
- Country (sports): India
- Born: 18 June 1994 (age 32) Barshi, Maharashtra, India
- Turned pro: 2012
- Plays: Right (two-handed backhand)
- Prize money: $168,237

Singles
- Career record: 112–102
- Career titles: 3 ITF
- Highest ranking: No. 335 (25 August 2014)

Doubles
- Career record: 346–306
- Career titles: 30 ITF
- Highest ranking: No. 125 (16 October 2017)
- Current ranking: No. 268 (27 July 2026)

Other doubles tournaments
- Olympic Games: 1R (2016)

Team competitions
- Fed Cup: 19–14
Medal record
Women's tennis
Representing India
Asian Games
Bronze medal – third place	2014 Incheon	Women's doubles
Asian Indoor Games
Silver medal – second place	2017 Ashgabat	Women's doubles
Silver medal – second place	2017 Ashgabat	Mixed doubles
South Asian Games
Gold medal – first place	2016 Guwahati	Women's doubles
Gold medal – first place	2019 Kathmandu	Women's doubles
Gold medal – first place	2019 Kathmandu	Women's team
Silver medal – second place	2016 Guwahati	Mixed doubles
Silver medal – second place	2019 Kathmandu	Mixed doubles
- Last updated on: 4 August 2026.

Prarthana Gulabrao Thombare (born 18 June 1994) is an Indian tennis player. A doubles specialist, she is the former Indian number one in women's doubles, and an Olympian.

== Career ==
Thombare has won three singles and 30 doubles titles on the ITF Women's Circuit. On 25 August 2014, she reached a career-high singles ranking of world No. 335. On 16 October 2017, she peaked at No. 125 in the doubles rankings.

Playing for the India Fed Cup team, Thombare has a win–loss record of 19–14 (12–12 in doubles) as of August 2026.

She won a bronze medal in women's doubles at the 2014 Asian Games, along with Sania Mirza. The pair also represented India at the 2016 Rio Olympics, but lost in the first round.

== Asian Games finals ==
=== Doubles: 1 (bronze medal) ===
Outcome	Year	Location	Partner	Opponents	Score
Bronze	2014	Incheon, South Korea	(India) Sania Mirza	(Chinese Taipei) Chan Chin-wei (Chinese Taipei) Hsieh Su-wei	6–7, 6–2, [4–10]

== WTA 125 finals ==
=== Doubles: 3 (3 runner-ups) ===
Result	W–L	Date	Tournament	Surface	Partner	Opponents	Score
Loss	0–1	Feb 2024	Mumbai Open, India	Hard	(Netherlands) Arianne Hartono	(Slovenia) Dalila Jakupović (United States) Sabrina Santamaria	4–6, 3–6
Loss	0–2	Feb 2025	Mumbai Open, India	Hard	(Netherlands) Arianne Hartono	Amina Anshba; Elena Pridankina	6–7^{(4)}, 6–2, [7–10]
Loss	0–3	Jul 2025	Hall of Fame Open, United States	Grass	(Netherlands) Arianne Hartono	(United States) Carmen Corley (United States) Ivana Corley	6–7^{(4)}, 3–6

== ITF Circuit finals ==
=== Singles: 5 (3 titles, 2 runner-ups) ===
Legend $25,000 tournaments $10/15,000 tournaments (3–2)	Finals by surface Hard (2–1) Clay (1–1)

Result	W–L	Date	Tournament	Tier	Surface	Opponent	Score
Loss	0–1	Sep 2013	ITF Sharm El Sheikh, Egypt	10,000	Hard	(Russia) Yana Sizikova	6–7^{(7)}, 6–3, 5–7
Win	1–1	Nov 2013	ITF Mumbai, India	15,000	Hard	(Chinese Taipei) Hsu Ching-wen	6–3, 6–7^{(10)}, 6–4
Loss	1–2	Jan 2014	ITF Aurangabad, India	10,000	Clay	(India) Sowjanya Bavisetti	7–5, 4–6, 4–6
Win	2–2	Apr 2014	ITF Chennai, India	10,000	Clay	(India) Eetee Maheta	4–6, 6–3, 7–6^{(5)}
Win	3–2	May 2014	ITF Hyderabad, India	10,000	Hard	(India) Rishika Sunkara	6–7^{(4)}, 6–4, 6–3

=== Doubles: 62 (30 titles, 32 runner-ups) ===
Legend W100 tournaments (2–2) W60/75 tournaments (5–3) W40/50 tournaments (2–2) W25/35 tournaments (7–15) W10/15 tournaments (14–10)	Finals by surface Hard (21–18) Clay (7–13) Grass (2–1)

Result	W–L	Date	Tournament	Tier	Surface	Partner	Opponents	Score
Loss	0–1	May 2012	ITF New Delhi, India	10,000	Hard	(India) Sri Peddy Reddy	(India) Rushmi Chakravarthi (India) Ankita Raina	3–6, 2–6
Loss	0–2	Jul 2012	ITF New Delhi, India	10,000	Hard	(India) Shweta Rana	(Japan) Risa Hasegawa (Japan) Miyabi Inoue	6–1, 5–7, [1–10]
Win	1–2	Mar 2013	ITF Hyderabad, India	10,000	Hard	(India) Natasha Palha	(India) Sharmada Balu (India) Sowjanya Bavisetti	6–1, 6–4
Win	2–2	Apr 2013	ITF Chennai, India	10,000	Clay	(India) Natasha Palha	(India) Rushmi Chakravarthi (India) Ankita Raina	5–7, 6–3, [10–6]
Loss	2–3	Apr 2013	ITF Lucknow, India	10,000	Grass	(India) Natasha Palha	(India) Nidhi Chilumula (Japan) Emi Mutaguchi	4–6, 6–7^{(4)}
Loss	2–4	Jun 2013	ITF New Delhi, India	10,000	Hard	(India) Natasha Palha	(India) Rishika Sunkara (Hungary) Naomi Totka	4–6, 6–4, [11–13]
Win	3–4	Aug 2013	ITF New Delhi, India	10,000	Hard	(Japan) Akari Inoue	(Sweden) Matilda Hamlin (India) Shweta Rana	6–1, 6–4
Win	4–4	Sep 2013	ITF Sharm El Sheikh, Egypt	10,000	Hard	(Russia) Julia Valetova	(Russia) Viktoriya Bogoslovskaya (Russia) Evgeniya Svintsova	6–1, 6–4
Win	5–4	Jan 2014	ITF Aurangabad, India	10,000	Clay	(India) Ankita Raina	(India) Shweta Rana (India) Rishika Sunkara	6–3, 6–3
Win	6–4	Mar 2014	ITF Sharm El Sheikh, Egypt	10,000	Hard	(Russia) Eugeniya Pashkova	(United Kingdom) Laura Deigman (United Kingdom) Emily Webley-Smith	6–2, 6–4
Loss	6–5	Apr 2014	ITF Chennai, India	10,000	Clay	(India) Natasha Palha	(India) Rishika Sunkara (India) Sharmada Balu	0–6, 6–7^{(4)}
Loss	6–6	May 2014	ITF Hyderabad, India	10,000	Hard	(India) Shweta Rana	(India) Rishika Sunkara (India) Sharmada Balu	1–6, 5–7
Loss	6–7	Jun 2014	Fergana Challenger, Uzbekistan	25,000	Hard	(Japan) Nao Hibino	(Japan) Hiroko Kuwata (Japan) Mari Tanaka	1–6, 4–6
Win	7–7	Aug 2014	ITF Bangalore, India	10,000	Hard	(India) Sharmada Balu	(Chinese Taipei) Hsu Ching-wen (India) Natasha Palha	6–4, 0–6, [10–6]
Win	8–7	Mar 2015	ITF Sharm El Sheikh, Egypt	10,000	Hard	(Russia) Ekaterina Yashina	(Belarus) Vera Lapko (Belarus) Anhelina Kalita	6–4, 5–7, [10–6]
Win	9–7	Apr 2015	ITF Dehra Dun, India	10,000	Hard	(Thailand) Nungnadda Wannasuk	(India) Prerna Bhambri (India) Rishika Sunkara	6–0, 6–4
Loss	9–8	Apr 2015	ITF Ahmedabad, India	25,000	Hard	(Japan) Nao Hibino	(Thailand) Peangtarn Plipuech (Thailand) Nungnadda Wannasuk	3–6, 6–2, [10–12]
Win	10–8	May 2015	ITF Balikpapan, Indonesia	25,000	Hard	(United Kingdom) Harriet Dart	(Thailand) Nicha Lertpitaksinchai (Thailand) Nudnida Luangnam	6–4, 4–6, [18–16]
Win	11–8	Jun 2015	ITF Sharm El Sheikh, Egypt	10,000	Hard	(Spain) Olga Parres Azcoitia	(Republic of Ireland) Jenny Claffey (Portugal) Inês Murta	6–4, 6–2
Loss	11–9	Jun 2015	ITF Sharm El Sheikh	10,000	Hard	(Spain) Olga Parres Azcoitia	(India) Rishika Sunkara (Netherlands) Eva Wacanno	1–6, 1–6
Win	12–9	Jun 2015	ITF Sharm El Sheikh	10,000	Hard	(Netherlands) Eva Wacanno	(Egypt) Ola Abou Zekry (Greece) Eleni Kordolaimi	6–4, 7–6^{(5)}
Loss	12–10	Sep 2015	ITF Hyderabad, India	10,000	Clay	(India) Prerna Bhambri	(India) Sowjanya Bavisetti (India) Rishika Sunkara	3–6, 4–6
Loss	12–11	Sep 2015	ITF Hyderabad, India	10,000	Clay	(India) Sharmada Balu	(Oman) Fatma Al-Nabhani (India) Prerna Bhambri	5–7, 2–6
Win	13–11	Sep 2015	ITF Hyderabad, India	10,000	Clay	(India) Sharmada Balu	(India) Nidhi Chilumula (India) Rishika Sunkara	2–6, 6–3, [12–10]
Win	14–11	Oct 2015	ITF Lucknow, India	10,000	Grass	(India) Prerna Bhambri	(India) Sharmada Balu (India) Nidhi Chilumula	6–3, 4–6, [10–7]
Win	15–11	Oct 2015	ITF Raipur, India	10,000	Hard	(India) Sharmada Balu	(India) Prerna Bhambri (India) Rishika Sunkara	6–3, 6–7^{(4)}, [10–8]
Win	16–11	Dec 2015	Lagos Open, Nigeria	25,000	Hard	(Bulgaria) Julia Terziyska	(Slovenia) Tadeja Majerič (Switzerland) Conny Perrin	4–6, 6–3, [10–8]
Loss	16–12	Dec 2015	Pune Open, India	25,000	Hard	(Chinese Taipei) Hsu Chieh-yu	(Russia) Valentyna Ivakhnenko (Ukraine) Anastasiya Vasylyeva	6–4, 2–6, [10–12]
Win	17–12	Mar 2016	ITF Puebla, Mexico	25,000	Hard (i)	(Japan) Akiko Omae	(Russia) Irina Khromacheva (Russia) Ksenia Lykina	6–4, 2–6, [10–8]
Loss	17–13	Mar 2016	ITF Irapuato, Mexico	25,000	Hard	(Japan) Akiko Omae	(Ukraine) Lyudmyla Kichenok (Ukraine) Nadiia Kichenok	1–6, 4–6
Win	18–13	Jun 2016	Open de Montpellier, France	25,000	Clay	(Netherlands) Eva Wacanno	(Spain) Lourdes Domínguez Lino (Switzerland) Jil Teichmann	7–5, 2–6, [11–9]
Loss	18–14	Oct 2016	Lagos Open, Nigeria	25,000	Hard	(Greece) Valentini Grammatikopoulou	(Netherlands) Chayenne Ewijk (Netherlands) Rosalie van der Hoek	5–7, 3–6
Win	19–14	Oct 2016	Lagos Open, Nigeria	25,000	Hard	(Greece) Valentini Grammatikopoulou	(India) Kyra Shroff (India) Dhruthi Tatachar Venugopal	6–7^{(3)}, 6–3, [11–9]
Loss	19–15	Feb 2017	ITF Perth, Australia	25,000	Hard	(Romania) Irina Bara	(Japan) Junri Namigata (Japan) Riko Sawayanagi	6–7^{(5)}, 6–4, [9–11]
Loss	19–16	Apr 2017	ITF Pula, Italy	25,000	Clay	(Netherlands) Eva Wacanno	(North Macedonia) Lina Gjorcheska (United States) Bernarda Pera	2–6, 3–6
Loss	19–17	Apr 2017	Kunming Open, China	100,000	Clay	(China) Xun Fangying	(China) Han Xinyun (China) Ye Qiuyu	2–6, 5–7
Win	20–17	Jun 2017	Hódmezővásárhely Ladies Open, Hungary	60,000	Clay	(Japan) Kotomi Takahata	(Norway) Ulrikke Eikeri (Croatia) Tereza Mrdeža	1–0 ret.
Win	21–17	Jun 2018	Manchester Trophy, UK	100,000	Grass	(Thailand) Luksika Kumkhum	(United Kingdom) Naomi Broady (United States) Asia Muhammad	7–6^{(5)}, 6–3
Loss	21–18	Jul 2018	Contrexéville Open, France	100,000	Clay	(Netherlands) Eva Wacanno	(Belgium) An-Sophie Mestach (China) Zheng Saisai	6–3, 2–6, [7–10]
Loss	21–19	Oct 2019	Lagos Open, Nigeria	25,000	Hard	(Egypt) Sandra Samir	(India) Rutuja Bhosale (Brazil) Laura Pigossi	6–4, 4–6, [7–10]
Loss	21–20	Oct 2019	Lagos Open, Nigeria	25,000	Hard	(Egypt) Sandra Samir	(India) Rutuja Bhosale (Brazil) Laura Pigossi	3–6, 7–6^{(3)}, [6–10]
Loss	21–21	Jan 2020	ITF Daytona Beach, US	W25	Clay	(Argentina) Paula Ormaechea	(Hungary) Dalma Gálfi (Belgium) Kimberley Zimmermann	6–7^{(4)}, 2–6
Loss	21–22	Mar 2021	ITF New Delhi, India	W15	Hard	(India) Sowjanya Bavisetti	(Slovenia) Pia Lovrič (Hungary) Adrienn Nagy	2–6, 3–6
Loss	21–23	Jan 2022	ITF Cairo, Egypt	W25	Clay	(Hungary) Adrienn Nagy	(Austria) Melanie Klaffner (Austria) Sinja Kraus	5–7, 3–6
Win	22–23	Feb 2022	Open de l'Isère, France	W60	Hard (i)	(Japan) Lily Miyazaki	(United Kingdom) Alicia Barnett (United Kingdom) Olivia Nicholls	6–3, 6–3
Loss	22–24	Feb 2022	Porto Indoor, Portugal	W25	Hard (i)	(Hungary) Adrienn Nagy	(Greece) Valentini Grammatikopoulou (Netherlands) Quirine Lemoine	2–6, 0–6
Loss	22–25	May 2022	ITF Montemor-o-Novo, Portugal	W25	Hard	(Australia) Alana Parnaby	(Portugal) Francisca Jorge (Portugal) Matilde Jorge	3–6, 4–6
Win	23–25	Jun 2022	ITF Prokuplje, Serbia	W25	Clay	(Kazakhstan) Zhibek Kulambayeva	(Spain) Leyre Romero Gormaz (Croatia) Tara Würth	w/o
Loss	23–26	Jul 2022	Liepāja Open, Latvia	W60	Clay	(United Kingdom) Emily Appleton	(Slovenia) Dalila Jakupović (Serbia) Ivana Jorović	4–6, 3–6
Loss	23–27	Aug 2022	ITF Vrnjačka Banja, Serbia	W25	Clay	(United Kingdom) Emily Appleton	(Romania) Cristina Dinu (Ukraine) Valeriya Strakhova	1–6, 6–4, [8–10]
Win	24–27	Dec 2022	ITF Solapur, India	W25	Hard	(India) Ankita Raina	(Indonesia) Priska Madelyn Nugroho; Ekaterina Yashina	6–1, 6–2
Loss	24–28	Dec 2022	ITF Navi Mumbai, India	W25	Hard	(India) Ankita Raina	(Indonesia) Priska Madelyn Nugroho; Ekaterina Yashina	3–6, 1–6
Win	25–28	Jan 2023	Pune Open, India	W40	Hard	(India) Ankita Raina	(Kazakhstan) Gozal Ainitdinova (Kazakhstan) Zhibek Kulambayeva	4–6, 7–5, [10–8]
Loss	25–29	Feb 2023	ITF Mâcon, France	W40	Hard (i)	Darya Astakhova	(Belgium) Magali Kempen (Switzerland) Xenia Knoll	3–6, 4–6
Win	26–29	Aug 2023	Internacional de Barcelona, Spain	W60	Hard	Anastasia Tikhonova	(France) Estelle Cascino (Latvia) Diāna Marcinkēviča	3–6, 6–1, [10–7]
Win	27–29	Apr 2024	Split Open, Croatia	W75	Clay	(Greece) Valentini Grammatikopoulou	(Slovenia) Veronika Erjavec (Lithuania) Justina Mikulskyte	6–4, 6–1
Win	28–29	Apr 2024	ITF Shenzhen, China	W50	Hard	(Netherlands) Arianne Hartono	(Hong Kong) Eudice Chong (United Kingdom) Madeleine Brooks	6–3, 6–2
Loss	28–30	May 2024	Zagreb Ladies Open, Croatia	W75	Clay	(United Kingdom) Emily Appleton	(Brazil) Laura Pigossi (Switzerland) Céline Naef	6–4, 1–6, [8–10]
Win	29–30	Jul 2024	Porto Open, Portugal	W75	Hard	(Netherlands) Arianne Hartono	(United States) Anna Rogers (Ukraine) Kateryna Volodko	6–3, 6–4
Loss	29–31	May 2025	Empire Slovak Open, Slovakia	W75	Clay	(Netherlands) Arianne Hartono	(France) Estelle Cascino (France) Carole Monnet	2–6, 2–6
Win	30–31	Jul 2025	Evansville Classic, United States	W100	Hard	(Netherlands) Arianne Hartono	(United States) Ayana Akli (United States) Victoria Osuigwe	6–3, 6–3
Loss	30–32	Aug 2026	Serbian Tennis Tour, Serbia	W50	Clay	(Bulgaria) Lia Karatancheva	(Bulgaria) Rositsa Dencheva; Maria Golovina	4–6, 7–6^{(7–0)}, [7–10]
