= Hódmezővásárhely Ladies Open =

ITF Women's Tour
- Event name: Hódmezővásárhely
- Location: Hódmezővásárhely, Hungary
- Venue: Hódmezővásárhelyi Tenisz Club
- Category: ITF $60,000
- Surface: Clay
- Prize money: $60,000
- Website: www.hungarianprocircuit.com

The Hódmezővásárhely Ladies Open was a tennis tournament held on outdoor clay courts at Hódmezővásárhely, Hungary. It was held from 2016 to 2018 and was part of the ITF Women's Circuit as a $60,000 event.

== Past finals ==
=== Singles ===
Year	Champion	Runner-up	Score
2018	(Colombia) Mariana Duque Mariño	(Romania) Irina Bara	4–6, 7–5, 6–2
2017	(Romania) Mihaela Buzărnescu	(Montenegro) Danka Kovinić	6–2, 6–1
2016	(Slovenia) Tamara Zidanšek	(Czech Republic) Karolína Muchová	4–6, 6–2, 6–4

=== Doubles ===
Year	Champions	Runners-up	Score
2018	(Hungary) Réka Luca Jani (Argentina) Nadia Podoroska	(Montenegro) Danka Kovinić (Serbia) Nina Stojanović	6–4, 6–4
2017	(Japan) Kotomi Takahata (India) Prarthana Thombare	(Norway) Ulrikke Eikeri (Croatia) Tereza Mrdeža	1–0 retired
2016	(Brazil) Laura Pigossi (Argentina) Nadia Podoroska	(Romania) Irina Bara (North Macedonia) Lina Gjorcheska	6–3, 6–0
