= Danka Kovinić =

Montenegrin tennis player (born 1994)

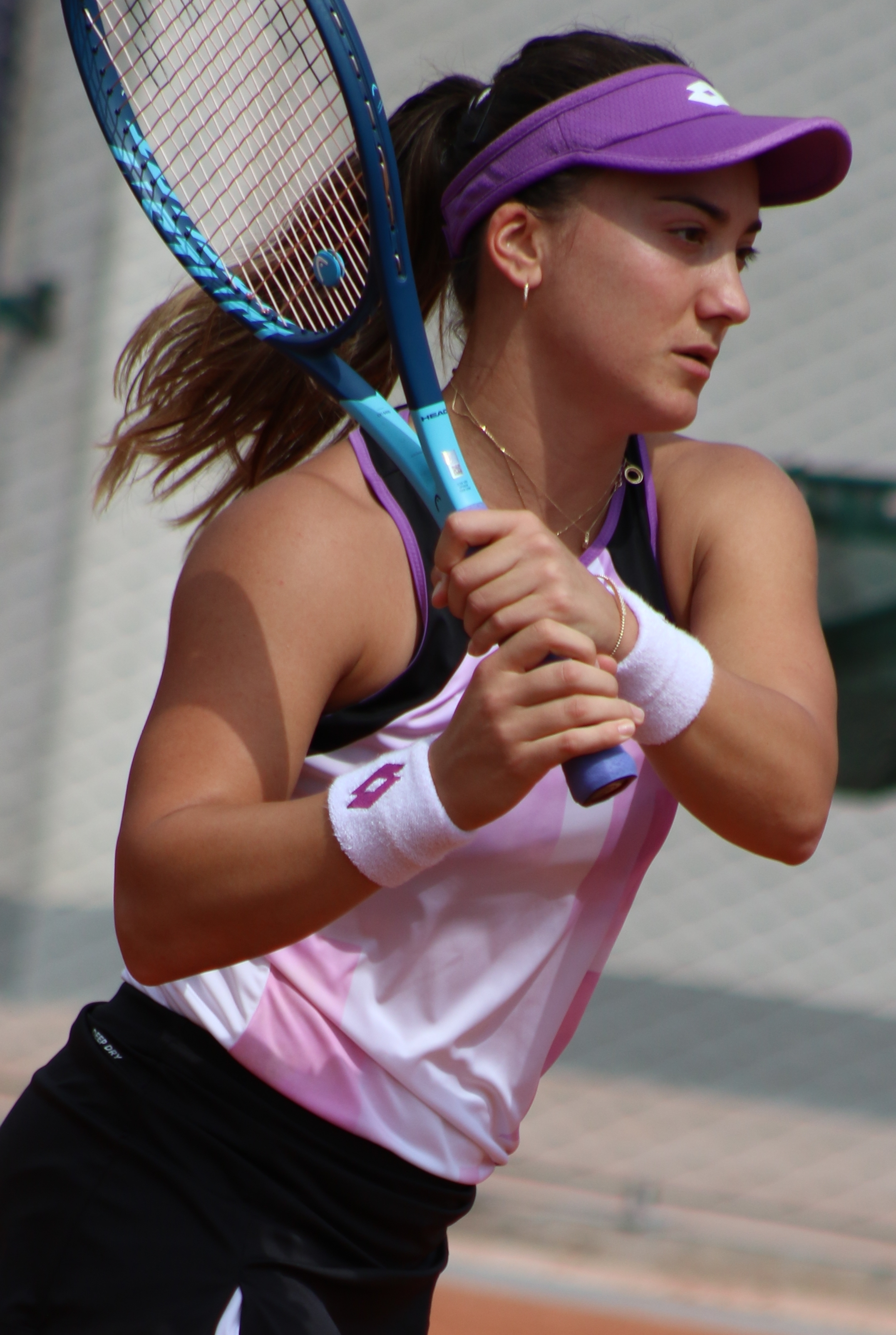
- Kovinić at the 2021 French Open
- Country (sports): Montenegro
- Residence: Herceg Novi, Montenegro
- Born: 18 November 1994 (age 31) Cetinje, Montenegro, FR Yugoslavia
- Height: 1.69 m (5 ft 7 in)
- Turned pro: 2010
- Plays: Right (two-handed backhand)
- Coach: Nemanja Plavšić
- Prize money: US$ 3,350,453

Singles
- Career record: 381–312
- Career titles: 0 WTA, 14 ITF
- Highest ranking: No. 46 (22 February 2016)
- Current ranking: No. 888 (28 September 2026)

Grand Slam singles results
- Australian Open: 3R (2022)
- French Open: 3R (2022)
- Wimbledon: 1R (2015, 2016, 2017)
- US Open: 2R (2015, 2020)

Other tournaments
- Olympic Games: 1R (2024)

Doubles
- Career record: 141–133
- Career titles: 1 WTA, 4 ITF
- Highest ranking: No. 67 (20 June 2016)
- Current ranking: No. 902 (28 September 2026)

Grand Slam doubles results
- Australian Open: 2R (2016, 2017, 2021)
- French Open: 1R (2016, 2020, 2021)
- Wimbledon: 1R (2016)
- US Open: 2R (2016, 2021)

Team competitions
- Fed Cup: 21–7
Medal record
Games of the Small States of Europe
Gold medal – first place	2015 Reykjavík	Singles
Bronze medal – third place	2015 Reykjavík	Mixed doubles
- Last updated on: 1 October 2026.

Danka Kovinić (Serbian Cyrillic: Данка Ковинић; born 18 November 1994) is a Montenegrin tennis player.

On 22 February 2016, she reached a career-high singles ranking of world No. 46, and on 20 June 2016, she peaked at No. 67 in the WTA doubles rankings.

== Career ==
=== 2010–2013: Tour debut and quarterfinal ===
Kovinić started playing as a professional in 2010. Her first WTA Tour tournament in singles was the 2013 Budapest Grand Prix, where she became the first Montenegrin to reach the quarterfinals of a WTA event.

=== 2015: WTA Tour singles final and doubles title ===
Her first major match wins in singles came at the 2015 French Open and the 2015 US Open. In October 2015, she reached her first WTA Tour singles final at the Tianjin Open.

Her first match in doubles on the WTA Tour was at Bogotá, in April 2014. She won her first WTA Tour doubles title with Stephanie Vogt, in July 2015 at Bad Gastein.

=== 2016: Top 50 debut ===
Kovinić started the season at the Auckland Open where she lost in the first round to third seed Caroline Wozniacki. In doubles, she and Barbora Strýcová reached the final which they lost to Elise Mertens and An-Sophie Mestach. At the Hobart International, Kovinić was defeated in the first round by Australian wildcard Kimberly Birrell. At the Australian Open, Kovinić made it to the second round and lost to 14th seed and two-time champion, Victoria Azarenka.

Seeded third at the Rio Open, Kovinić advanced to the quarterfinals where she was defeated by wildcard Sorana Cîrstea. Seeded seventh at the Abierto Mexicano, she lost in the second round to Christina McHale. Seeded seventh at the Monterrey Open, she was defeated in the first round by qualifier Nicole Gibbs. At the Indian Wells Open, Kovinić faced eighth seed Petra Kvitová in the second round. She pushed Kvitová to three sets but ended up losing the match. At the Miami Open, Kovinić was defeated in the second round by 24th seed Johanna Konta.

=== 2020: Return to majors ===
At the Australian Open, Kovinić lost in the first round to 16th seed Elise Mertens.

At the Mexican Open, she was defeated in the first round by Kateryna Bondarenko. At the Monterrey Open, she lost in the first round to top seed and eventual champion Elina Svitolina.

In August, Kovinić played at the Cincinnati Open where she was defeated in the first round of qualifying by Vera Zvonareva. At the US Open, she made it to the second round and lost to 24th seed Magda Linette.

=== 2021: WTA 500 final ===
In January, she started her Australian tour at the Gippsland Trophy with a win against Tamara Zidanšek, before losing to Jeļena Ostapenko in the next round. After that, she played at the Australian Open where she lost in the first round against top seed and world No. 1, Ashleigh Barty. Her next tournament was the Phillip Island Trophy where she played against 13th seed Marie Bouzková and retired during the second set, after winning the first.

In March, Danka made the round of 16 at the Abierto Zapopan in Guadalajara, Mexico where she was defeated in straight sets by Lauren Davis. During the tournament, she suffered a back injury and had to pull out of Monterrey Open and Miami Open.

In April, Kovinić made it into the quarterfinals of the Charleston Open by beating third seeded Petra Kvitová in straight sets in the round of 16. It was her third victory over a player who was ranked inside top 10. In the next round, she defeated 11th seed Yulia Putintseva to reach her first WTA 500 semifinal. After that, she beat 12th seeded Ons Jabeur in straight sets, to book a place in her third career final which she lost to Veronika Kudermetova.

After that, she entered the MUSC Health Open in Charleston where she reached her second consecutive WTA Tour semifinal by beating Viktoriya Tomova in straight sets, seventh seeded Lauren Davis in the round of 16, and Shelby Rogers in the quarterfinals. She then lost to the top seed Ons Jabeur.

=== 2022: Historic major third round ===
In January, she started her Australian tour at the Melbourne Summer Set with a straight-sets win in qualifying against Alexandra Osborne, before withdrawing due to injury in the next round. At Adelaide, she lost in the first round to Maddison Inglis, in three sets.

At the Australian Open, she won in the first round against Jang Su-jeong, before she defeated reigning US Open champion Emma Raducanu in three sets to reach the third round, her best result at a Grand Slam championship. In the next round, she was defeated by the former world No. 1, Simona Halep. With this result, she became the first player from Montenegro to reach the third round of a Grand Slam championship.

In Indian Wells, Kovinić beat Jil Teichmann in the first round, while in the second round she had a surprising top-10 win over seventh seed Karolína Plíšková, before losing to Ludmilla Samsonova in the third round.

At Roland Garros, she avenged her loss in Indian Wells and beat 25th seed Ludmilla Samsonova in the first round. She managed to beat Anna Karolína Schmiedlová in straight sets, before losing to top seed and world No. 1, Iga Świątek, in the third round.

Kovinić was supposed to play at Wimbledon against Sonay Kartal in the first round, but was forced to withdraw at the very last moment, due to low back problems.

Kovinić lost in the first round of the US Open to Serena Williams, who was playing in the last professional tournament of her career.

In October, she reached semifinals of the Emilia-Romagna Open by beating Océane Dodin, Jasmine Paolini and Sloane Stephens. However, she lost her semifinal match to top seed Maria Sakkari.

=== 2023: Semifinals of Auckland Open, hiatus ===
In January, Kovinić reached the semifinals of the Auckland Open, after beating Nao Hibino in straight sets in the first round. In the round of 16, she defeated Lauren Davis in three sets, while in the quarterfinals she managed to beat Viktória Kužmová in straight sets. In her semifinal match, she lost to the top seed Coco Gauff.

=== 2024: Paris Olympics and injury problems ===
In June, Kovinić was granted a universality place into the Paris Olympics to represent Montenegro. She was chosen as one of the flag-bearers for the team at the opening ceremony. However, she was beaten in the first round by Greece's Maria Sakkari She subsequently played just six more matches throughout the rest of the year due to injury.

=== 2025–2026: Australian Open second round, back injury, comeback ===
Kovinić entered the 2025 Australian Open using her protected ranking and defeated Lulu Sun to reach the second round, where she lost to 32nd seed Dayana Yastremska. After competing in a WTA 125 tournament the following month, she was then sidelined for 15 months due to a back injury before returning to the competitive tennis court at the WTA 125 İstanbul Open in May 2026, losing to wildcard entrant Adelina Lachinova in the first round. Later that month, using her protected ranking to enter, Kovinić played her first WTA Tour level match since January 2025 at the Morocco Open, again losing in the first round, this time to qualifier Fiona Ferro.

== Performance timelines ==
Key
W	F	SF	QF	#R	RR	Q#	P#	DNQ	A	Z#	PO	G	S	B	NMS	NTI	P	NH

(W) winner; (F) finalist; (SF) semifinalist; (QF) quarterfinalist; (#R) rounds 4, 3, 2, 1; (RR) round-robin stage; (Q#) qualification round; (P#) preliminary round; (DNQ) did not qualify; (A) absent; (Z#) Davis/Fed Cup Zonal Group (with number indication) or (PO) play-off; (G) gold, (S) silver or (B) bronze Olympic/Paralympic medal; (NMS) not a Masters tournament; (NTI) not a Tier I tournament; (P) postponed; (NH) not held; (SR) strike rate (events won / competed); (W–L) win–loss record.
To avoid confusion and double counting, these charts are updated at the conclusion of a tournament or when the player's participation has ended.

Only main-draw results in WTA Tour, Grand Slam tournaments, Billie Jean King Cup, United Cup, Hopman Cup and Olympic Games are included in win–loss records.

=== Singles ===
Current through the 2023 WTA Tour.

Tournament	2011	2012	2013	2014	2015	2016	2017	2018	2019	2020	2021	2022	2023	SR	W–L	Win %
Grand Slam tournaments
Australian Open	A	A	A	Q3	Q1	2R	2R	Q2	Q3	1R	1R	3R	1R	0 / 6	4–6	40%
French Open	A	A	A	1R	2R	1R	1R	Q1	Q1	1R	2R	3R	1R	0 / 8	4–8	33%
Wimbledon	A	A	A	Q3	1R	1R	1R	Q1	Q2	NH	A	A	A	0 / 3	0–3	0%
US Open	A	A	Q2	Q1	2R	1R	Q2	Q1	Q2	2R	1R	1R	1R	0 / 6	2–6	25%
Win–loss	0–0	0–0	0–0	0–1	2–3	1–4	1–3	0–0	0–0	1–3	1–3	4–3	0–3	0 / 23	10–23	30%
National representation
Summer Olympics	NH	A	NH			1R	NH				A	NH		0 / 1	0–1	0%
Billie Jean King Cup (Note: Formerly known as Fed Cup until 2020.)	POZ3	POZ2	POZ2	A	A	Z3	A	Z3	A	A (Note: Edition is split into the two years due to COVID-19.)		A		0 / 0	12–3	80%
WTA 1000
Dubai / Qatar Open (Note: The first Premier 5 event of the year has switched back and forth between the Dubai Tennis Championships and the Qatar Ladies Open since 2009. Dubai was classified as a Premier 5 event from 2009 to 2011 before being succeeded by Doha for the 2012–2014 period. In 2015, Dubai regained its Premier 5 status while Doha was demoted to Premier status. The Premier 5 tournaments were reclassified as WTA 1000 tournaments in 2021.)	A	A	A	Q2	A	A	A	Q2	A	A	A	A	Q1	0 / 0	0–0	–
Indian Wells Open	A	A	A	A	A	2R	1R	A	A	NH	1R	3R	1R	0 / 5	3–5	38%
Miami Open	A	A	A	A	Q2	2R	1R	A	A	NH	A	1R	1R	0 / 4	1–4	20%
Madrid Open	A	A	A	A	A	2R	A	A	A	NH	1R	Q2	2R	0 / 3	2–3	40%
Italian Open	A	A	A	A	A	1R	A	A	A	3R	A	A	2R	0 / 3	3–3	50%
Canadian Open	A	A	A	A	A	A	A	A	A	NH	A	A	A	0 / 0	0–0	–
Cincinnati Open	A	A	A	A	A	Q1	A	A	A	Q1	A	Q1	A	0 / 0	0–0	–
Guadalajara Open	NH											A	A	0 / 0	0–0	–
Pan Pacific / Wuhan Open (Note: In 2014, the Pan Pacific Open was downgraded to a Premier event and replaced by the Wuhan Open. The Premier 5 tournaments were reclassified as WTA 1000 tournaments in 2021.)	A	A	A	A	1R	1R	Q1	A	A	NH				0 / 2	0–2	0%
China Open	A	A	A	A	Q1	1R	Q1	A	A	NH			A	0 / 1	0–1	0%
Win–loss	0–0	0–0	0–0	0–0	0–1	3–6	0–2	0–0	0–0	2–1	0–2	2–2	2–4	0 / 18	9–18	33%
Career statistics
	2011	2012	2013	2014	2015	2016	2017	2018	2019	2020	2021	2022	2023	SR	W–L	Win %
Tournaments	0	0	2	12	13	23	16	5	3	7	17	11	11	Career total: 120		
Titles	0	0	0	0	0	0	0	0	0	0	0	0	0	Career total: 0		
Finals	0	0	0	0	1	1	0	0	0	0	1	0	0	Career total: 3		
Overall win–loss	3–1	2–2	5–2	6–12	15–13	20–23	3–16	5–5	2–3	5–7	12–17	9–11	8–11	0 / 120	95–123	44%
Year-end ranking (Note: 2010: WTA ranking–687.)	354	295	170	109	58	74	118	182	88	77	95	79	111	$3,108,194		

=== Doubles ===
Tournament	2015	2016	2017	...	2020	2021	2022	2023	SR	W–L
Australian Open	A	2R	2R		A	2R	1R	1R	0 / 5	3–5
French Open	A	1R	A		1R	1R	A	A	0 / 3	0–3
Wimbledon	A	1R	A		NH	A	A	A	0 / 1	0–1
US Open	1R	2R	A		A	2R	A	A	0 / 3	2–3
Win–loss	0–1	2–4	1–1		0–1	2–3	0–1	0–1	0 / 12	5–12

== WTA Tour finals ==
=== Singles: 3 (3 runner-ups) ===
Legend WTA 500 (0–1) WTA 250 (0–2)	Finals by surface Hard (0–1) Clay (0–2)

Result	W–L	Date	Tournament	Tier	Surface	Opponent	Score
Loss	0–1	Oct 2015	Tianjin Open, China	International (Note: The WTA International tournaments were reclassified as WTA 250 tournaments in 2021.)	Hard	(Poland) Agnieszka Radwańska	1–6, 2–6
Loss	0–2	Apr 2016	İstanbul Cup, Turkey	International	Clay	(Turkey) Çağla Büyükakçay	6–3, 2–6, 3–6
Loss	0–3	Apr 2021	Charleston Open, US	WTA 500	Clay	(Russia) Veronika Kudermetova	4–6, 2–6

=== Doubles: 5 (1 title, 4 runner-ups) ===
Legend WTA 500 WTA 250 (1–4)	Finals by surface Hard (0–2) Clay (1–2)

Result	W–L	Date	Tournament	Tier	Surface	Partner	Opponents	Score
Win	1–0	Jul 2015	Gastein Ladies, Austria	International	Clay	(Liechtenstein) Stephanie Vogt	(Spain) Lara Arruabarrena (Czech Republic) Lucie Hradecká	4–6, 6–4, [10–3]
Loss	1–1	Jan 2016	Auckland Open, New Zealand	International	Hard	(Czech Republic) Barbora Strýcová	(Belgium) Elise Mertens (Belgium) An-Sophie Mestach	6–2, 3–6, [5–10]
Loss	1–2	Apr 2016	İstanbul Cup, Turkey	International	Clay	(Switzerland) Xenia Knoll	(Romania) Andreea Mitu (Turkey) İpek Soylu	w/o
Loss	1–3	Jul 2018	Bucharest Open, Romania	International	Clay	(Belgium) Maryna Zanevska	(Romania) Irina-Camelia Begu (Romania) Andreea Mitu	3–6, 4–6
Loss	1–4	Sep 2018	Guangzhou Open, China	International	Hard	(Belarus) Vera Lapko	(Australia) Monique Adamczak (Australia) Jessica Moore	6–4, 5–7, [4–10]

== WTA 125 finals ==
=== Singles: 2 (runner-ups) ===
Result	W–L	Date	Tournament	Surface	Opponent	Score
Loss	0–1	Jul 2019	Bastad Open, Sweden	Clay	(Japan) Misaki Doi	4–6, 4–6
Loss	0–2	Nov 2022	Buenos Aires Open, Argentina	Clay	(Hungary) Panna Udvardy	4–6, 1–6

=== Doubles: 2 (runner-ups) ===
Result	W–L	Date	Tournament	Surface	Partner	Opponents	Score
Loss	0–1	Mar 2019	Bastad Open, Sweden	Clay	(Chile) Alexa Guarachi	(Japan) Misaki Doi (Russia) Natalia Vikhlyantseva	5–7, 7–6^{(7–4)}, [7–10]
Loss	0–2	Nov 2019	Taipei Open, Taiwan	Carpet (i)	(Slovenia) Dalila Jakupović	(Chinese Taipei) Lee Ya-hsuan (Chinese Taipei) Wu Fang-hsien	6–4, 4–6, [7–10]

== ITF Circuit finals ==
=== Singles: 22 (14 titles, 8 runner-ups) ===
Legend
$100,000 tournaments (5–2)
$80,000 tournaments (0–1)
$50/60,000 tournaments (1–1)
$25,000 tournaments (5–3)
$10,000 tournaments (3–1)

Result	W–L	Date	Tournament	Tier	Surface	Opponent	Score
Win	1–0	Oct 2010	ITF Dobrich, Bulgaria	10,000	Clay	(Bulgaria) Isabella Shinikova	6–4, 6–3
Loss	1–1	Jun 2011	ITF Nyíregyháza, Hungary	10,000	Clay	(Czech Republic) Simona Dobrá	4–6, 2–6
Win	2–1	Jun 2011	ITF Balş, Romania	10,000	Clay	(Romania) Alice-Andrada Radu	6–0, 6–1
Loss	2–2	Sep 2011	Royal Cup, Montenegro	25,000	Clay	(Argentina) Paula Ormaechea	1–6, 1–6
Win	3–2	Apr 2012	ITF Tlemcen, Algeria	10,000	Clay	(Russia) Alexandra Romanova	6–2, 6–2
Win	4–2	Jul 2012	Bella Cup Toruń, Poland	25,000	Clay	(Poland) Paula Kania	6–3, 4–6, 6–3
Win	5–2	Jun 2013	ITF Ystad, Sweden	25,000	Clay	(Austria) Melanie Klaffner	6–3, 6–3
Win	6–2	Jun 2013	ITF Kristinehamn, Sweden	25,000	Clay	(Bosnia and Herzegovina) Jasmina Tinjić	6–1, 7–5
Win	7–2	May 2014	Open Saint-Gaudens, France	50,000	Clay	(France) Pauline Parmentier	6–1, 6–2
Loss	7–3	Mar 2015	ITF Curitiba, Brazil	25,000	Clay	(Spain) Lourdes Domínguez Lino	6–4, 2–6, 3–6
Win	8–3	May 2015	Empire Slovak Open, Slovakia	100,000	Clay	(Russia) Margarita Gasparyan	7–5, 6–3
Win	9–3	Jun 2016	Open de Marseille, France	100,000	Clay	(Chinese Taipei) Hsieh Su-wei	6–2, 6–3
Loss	9–4	Jun 2017	Hódmezővásárhely Ladies Open, Hungary	60,000	Clay	(Romania) Mihaela Buzărnescu	2–6, 1–6
Loss	9–5	Jul 2017	Budapest Pro Open, Hungary	100,000	Clay	(Slovakia) Jana Čepelová	4–6, 3–6
Loss	9–6	Aug 2017	Vancouver Open, Canada	100,000	Hard	(Belgium) Maryna Zanevska	7–5, 1–6, 3–6
Loss	9–7	Mar 2019	ITF São Paulo, Brazil	W25	Clay	(United States) Louisa Chirico	0–6, 2–6
Win	10–7	Mar 2019	ITF Campinas, Brazil	W25	Clay	(Austria) Julia Grabher	6–2, 3–6, 6–3
Win	11–7	Jun 2019	ITF Ystad, Sweden	W25	Clay	(Netherlands) Richèl Hogenkamp	2–6, 6–3, 6–3
Loss	11–8	Jul 2019	Open de Biarritz, France	W80	Clay	(Bulgaria) Viktoriya Tomova	2–6, 7–5, 5–7
Win	12–8	Oct 2019	Kiskút Open, Hungary	W100	Clay (i)	(Romania) Irina-Camelia Begu	6–4, 3–6, 6–3
Win	13–8	May 2022	Wiesbaden Open, Germany	W100	Clay	(Germany) Nastasja Schunk	6–3, 7–6^{(7–0)}
Win	14–8	April 2023	Oeiras Ladies Open, Portugal	W100	Clay	(Spain) Rebeka Masarova	6–2, 6–2

=== Doubles: 11 (4 titles, 7 runner-ups) ===
Legend
$100,000 tournaments (1–0)
$60,000 tournaments (0–3)
$25,000 tournaments (3–4)

Result	W–L	Date	Tournament	Tier	Surface	Partner	Opponents	Score
Loss	0–1	Sep 2011	Royal Cup, Montenegro	25,000	Clay	(Montenegro) Danica Krstajić	(Italy) Corinna Dentoni (Argentina) Florencia Molinero	4–6, 7–5, [5–10]
Loss	0–2	Oct 2011	Lagos Open, Nigeria	25,000	Hard	(Ukraine) Elina Svitolina	(Austria) Melanie Klaffner (Romania) Ágnes Szatmári	0–6, 7–6, [5–10]
Loss	0–3	Apr 2013	ITF Mamaia, Romania	25,000	Clay	(Slovenia) Tadeja Majerič	(Romania) Elena Bogdan (Romania) Raluca Olaru	6–7^{(4)}, 3–6
Loss	0–4	Sep 2012	ITF La Marsa, Tunisia	25,000	Clay	(Brazil) Laura Pigossi	(Hungary) Réka Luca Jani (Russia) Eugeniya Pashkova	3–6, 6–4, [5–10]
Win	1–4	May 2012	ITF Caserta, Italy	25,000	Clay	(Czech Republic) Renata Voráčová	(Romania) Elena Bogdan (Romania) Cristina Dinu	6–4, 7–6^{(3)}
Win	2–4	Feb 2015	ITF São Paulo, Brazil	25,000	Clay	(Romania) Andreea Mitu	(Argentina) Tatiana Búa (Brazil) Paula Cristina Gonçalves	6–2, 7–5
Win	3–4	Jul 2015	Contrexéville Open, France	100,000	Clay	(Georgia (country)) Oksana Kalashnikova	(France) Irina Ramialison (France) Constance Sibille	2–6, 6–3, [10–6]
Loss	3–5	Mar 2018	Zhuhai Open, China	60,000	Hard	(Japan) Nao Hibino	(Russia) Anna Blinkova (Netherlands) Lesley Kerkhove	5–7, 4–6
Loss	3–6	Mar 2018	Pingshan Open, China	60,000	Hard	(China) Wang Xinyu	(Russia) Anna Kalinskaya (Slovakia) Viktória Kužmová	4–6, 6–1, [7–10]
Loss	3–7	Jun 2018	Hódmezővásárhely Ladies Open, Hungary	60,000	Clay	(Serbia) Nina Stojanović	(Hungary) Réka Luca Jani (Argentina) Nadia Podoroska	4–6, 4–6
Win	4–7	Mar 2019	ITF Campinas, Brazil	W25	Clay	(Brazil) Laura Pigossi	(Brazil) Carolina Alves (Brazil) Gabriela Cé	6–3, 6–2

== Other finals ==
=== Singles ===
Outcome	Year	Championship	Surface	Opponent	Score
Gold	2015	Games of the Small States of Europe	Clay	(Liechtenstein) Kathinka von Deichmann	6–0, 6–1

== Record against other players ==
=== Top 10 wins ===
Season	2016	...	2020	2021	2022	Total
Wins	1		1	0	1	3

#	Player	Rank	Event	Surface	Rd	Score
2016
1.	(Italy) Roberta Vinci	No. 8	Madrid Open, Spain	Clay	1R	6–4, 6–2
2020
2.	(Switzerland) Belinda Bencic	No. 10	Italian Open, Italy	Clay	2R	6–3, 6–1
2022
3.	(Czech Republic) Karolína Plíšková	No. 8	Indian Wells Open, US	Hard	2R	2–6, 7–5, 6–4
