= 2016 Fed Cup Asia/Oceania Zone Group II – play-offs =

The play-offs of the 2016 Fed Cup Asia/Oceania Zone Group II were the final stages of the Group II Zonal Competition involving teams from Asia and Oceania. Using the positions determined in their pools, the eleven teams faced off to determine their placing in the 2016 Fed Cup Asia/Oceania Zone Group II. The top team advanced to Asia/Oceania Group I in 2017.

== Pool results ==
| Placing | Pool A | Pool B |
|---|---|---|
| 1 | Philippines | Singapore |
| 2 | Hong Kong | Malaysia |
| 3 | Pacific Oceania | Indonesia |
| 4 | Iran | Sri Lanka |
| 5 | Bahrain | Pakistan |
| 6 | — | Kyrgyzstan |

== Promotion play-off ==
The first placed teams of the pools were drawn in a head-to-head round. The winner advanced to Group I in 2017.

=== Philippines vs. Singapore ===
Philippines
2
True Arena Hua Hin, Hua Hin, Thailand
16 April 2016
Outdoor hard

Singapore
0

| | | | 1 | 2 | 3 |
|---|---|---|---|---|---|---|
| 1 | (Philippines) (Singapore) | Khim Iglupas; Charmaine Shi Yi Seah | 6; 2 | 6; 4 |
| 2 | (Philippines) (Singapore) | Katharina Lehnert; Stefanie Tan | 3; 6 | 6; 3 | 6; 4 |
| 3 | (Philippines) (Singapore) | Katharina Lehnert / Anna Clarice Patrimonio; Charmaine Shi Yi Seah / Stefanie Tan | | | | not played |

== 3rd to 4th play-offs ==
The second placed teams of the pools were drawn in a head-to-head round to determine the third and fourth placed teams.

=== Hong Kong vs. Malaysia ===
Hong Kong
2
True Arena Hua Hin, Hua Hin, Thailand
16 April 2016
Outdoor hard

Malaysia
1

| | | | 1 | 2 | 3 |
|---|---|---|---|---|---|
| 1 | (Hong Kong) (Malaysia) | Maggie Ng; Theiviya Selvarajoo | 7^{7} 6^{3} | 6; 0 |
| 2 | (Hong Kong) (Malaysia) | Wu Ho-ching; Jawairiah Noordin | 5; 7 | 3; 6 |
| 3 | (Hong Kong) (Malaysia) | Maggie Ng / Sher Chun-wing; Jawairiah Noordin / Theiviya Selvarajoo | 6; 3 | 7^{7} 6^{4} |

== 5th to 6th play-offs ==
The third placed teams of the pools were drawn in a head-to-head round to determine the fifth and sixth placed teams.

=== Pacific Oceania vs. Indonesia ===
Pacific Oceania
0
True Arena Hua Hin, Hua Hin, Thailand
16 April 2016
Outdoor hard

Indonesia
2

| | | | 1 | 2 | 3 |
|---|---|---|---|---|---|---|
| 1 | (Pacific Oceania) (Indonesia) | Mayka Zima; Jessy Rompies | 2; 6 | 0; 6 |
| 2 | (Pacific Oceania) (Indonesia) | Steffi Carruthers; Deria Nur Haliza | 3; 6 | 1; 6 |
| 3 | (Pacific Oceania) (Indonesia) | Steffi Carruthers / Ayana Rengiil; Beatrice Gumulya / Lavinia Tananta | | | | not played |

== 7th to 8th play-offs ==
The fourth placed teams of the pools were drawn in a head-to-head round of determine the seventh and eighth placed teams.

=== Iran vs. Sri Lanka ===
Iran
1
True Arena Hua Hin, Hua Hin, Thailand
16 April 2016
Outdoor hard

Sri Lanka
2

| | | | 1 | 2 | 3 |
|---|---|---|---|---|---|
| 1 | (Iran) (Sri Lanka) | Sadaf Sadeghvaziri; Amreetha Muttiah | 0; 6 | 1; 6 |
| 2 | (Iran) (Sri Lanka) | Sara Amiri; Nethmi Himashi Waduge | 6; 1 | 6; 0 |
| 3 | (Iran) (Sri Lanka) | Sara Amiri / Sadaf Sadeghvaziri; Amreetha Muttiah / Medhira Samarasinghe | 5; 7 | 3; 6 |

== 9th to 10th play-offs ==
The fifth placed teams of the pools were drawn in a head-to-head round to determine the ninth and tenth placed teams.

=== Bahrain vs. Pakistan ===
Bahrain
0
True Arena Hua Hin, Hua Hin, Thailand
16 April 2016
Outdoor hard

Pakistan
3

| | | | 1 | 2 | 3 |
|---|---|---|---|---|---|
| 1 | (Bahrain) (Pakistan) | Nazli Nader Redha; Sarah Mahboob Khan | 0; 6 | 0; 6 |
| 2 | (Bahrain) (Pakistan) | Maram Mohamed Sharif; Ushna Suhail | 0; 6 | 0; 6 |
| 3 | (Bahrain) (Pakistan) | Malak Jasim Fardan / Nazli Nader Redha; Sara Mansoor / Ushna Suhail | 0; 6 | 0; 6 |

== Final placements ==
| Placing | Teams |
| Promoted/First | Philippines |
| Second | Singapore |
| Third | Hong Kong |
| Fourth | Malaysia |
| Fifth | Indonesia |
| Six | Pacific Oceania |
| Seventh | Sri Lanka |
| Eighth | Iran |
| Ninth | Pakistan |
| Tenth | Bahrain |
| Eleventh | Kyrgyzstan |

- Philippines were promoted to Asia/Oceania Group I in 2017.

== See also ==
- Fed Cup structure
