= 2015 Fed Cup Asia/Oceania Zone Group II – play-offs =

The play-offs of the 2015 Fed Cup Asia/Oceania Zone Group II were the final stages of the Group II Zonal Competition involving teams from Asia and Oceania. Using the positions determined in their pools, the eleven teams faced off to determine their placing in the 2015 Fed Cup Asia/Oceania Zone Group II. The top team advanced to Asia/Oceania Group I in 2016.

== Pool results ==
Placing	Pool A	Pool B	Pool C	Pool D
1	Philippines	Turkmenistan	India	Indonesia
2	Singapore	Iran	Malaysia	Pacific Oceania
3	N/A	Kyrgyzstan	Pakistan	Sri Lanka

== 1st to 4th play-offs ==
The first placed teams of the pools were drawn in head-to-head rounds.

=== Philippines vs. Indonesia ===
Philippines
2
SAAP Tennis Complex, Hyderabad, India
17 April 2014
Hard (indoors)

Indonesia
1

			1	2	3
1	(Philippines) (Indonesia)	Anna Clarice Patrimonio; Lavinia Tananta	3; 6	1; 6
2	(Philippines) (Indonesia)	Katharina Lehnert; Deria Nur Haliza	6; 4	6; 2
3	(Philippines) (Indonesia)	Katharina Lehnert / Anna Clarice Patrimonio; Ayu Fani Damayanti / Lavinia Tananta	6^{12} 7^{14}	6; 4	6; 2

=== Turkmenistan vs. India ===
Turkmenistan
0
SAAP Tennis Complex, Hyderabad, India
17 April 2014
Hard (indoors)

India
2

			1	2	3
1	(Turkmenistan) (India)	Jahana Bayramova; Prarthana Thombare	0; 6	2; 6
2	(Turkmenistan) (India)	Anastasiya Prenko; Ankita Raina	1; 6	2; 6
3	(Turkmenistan) (India)	Jahana Bayramova / Guljan Muhammetkuliyeva; Natasha Palha / Ankita Raina				not played

== Promotion play-off ==
The winners of the 1st to 4th play-offs then played against each other for promotion. The winner advances to the Asia/Oceania Group I in 2016.

=== Philippines vs. India ===
Philippines
1
SAAP Tennis Complex, Hyderabad, India
18 April 2014
Hard (indoors)

India
2

			1	2	3
1	(Philippines) (India)	Anna Clarice Patrimonio; Prarthana Thombare	3; 6	1; 6
2	(Philippines) (India)	Katharina Lehnert; Ankita Raina	2; 6	7; 5	7; 5
3	(Philippines) (India)	Katharina Lehnert / Anna Clarice Patrimonio; Sania Mirza / Prarthana Thombare	3; 6	3; 6

== 5th to 8th play-offs ==
The second placed teams of the pools were drawn in head-to-head rounds to find the fifth to eighth placed teams.

=== Singapore vs. Pacific Oceania ===
Singapore
0
SAAP Tennis Complex, Hyderabad, India
17 April 2014
Hard (indoors)

Pacific Oceania
3

			1	2	3
1	(Singapore) (Pacific Oceania)	Angeline Devi Devanthiran; Abigail Tere-Apisah	0; 6	3; 6
2	(Singapore) (Pacific Oceania)	Wee Khee-yen; Steffi Carruthers	2; 6	0; 6
3	(Singapore) (Pacific Oceania)	Wi Joanne Koh / Sarah Pang; Brittany Teei / Abigail Tere-Apisah	0; 6	3; 6

=== Iran vs. Malaysia ===
Iran
0
SAAP Tennis Complex, Hyderabad, India
17 April 2014
Hard (indoors)

Malaysia
2

			1	2	3
1	(Iran) (Malaysia)	Ghazal Pakbaten; Yus Syazlin Nabila Binti Yusri	3; 6	5; 7
2	(Iran) (Malaysia)	Sara Amini; Theiviya Selvarajoo	4; 6	2; 6
3	(Iran) (Malaysia)	Sadaf Sadeghvaziri / Ghazaleh Torkaman; Jawairiah Noordin / Yus Syazlin Nabila Binti Yusri				not played

== 9th to 10th play-offs ==
The third placed teams of Pools B and C were drawn in a head-to-head round to find the 9th and 10th placed teams. The third-place team from Pool D finished in 11th place.

=== Kyrgyzstan vs. Pakistan ===
Kyrgyzstan
0
SAAP Tennis Complex, Hyderabad, India
18 April 2014
Hard (indoors)

Pakistan
2

			1	2	3
1	(Kyrgyzstan) (Pakistan)	Saara Kunakunova; Iman Qureshi	1; 6	2; 6
2	(Kyrgyzstan) (Pakistan)	Eliza Askarova; Ushna Suhail	6; 3	0; 6	1; 6
3	(Kyrgyzstan) (Pakistan)	Ansari Abildaeva / Eliza Askarova; Sara Mansoor / Ushna Suhail				not played

== Final placements ==
Placing	Teams	
Promoted	India	
Second	Philippines	
Third	Indonesia	Turkmenistan
Fifth	Malaysia	Pacific Oceania
Seventh	Iran	Singapore
Ninth	Pakistan	
Tenth	Kyrgyzstan	
Eleventh	Sri Lanka	

- India advanced to Asia/Oceania Zone Group I in 2016.

== See also ==
- Fed Cup structure
