= 2016 Fed Cup Asia/Oceania Zone Group I – play-offs =

International tennis competition play-offs

The play-offs of the 2016 Fed Cup Asia/Oceania Zone Group I were the final stages of the Group I Zonal Competition involving teams from Asia and Oceania. Using the positions determined in their pools, the eight teams faced off to determine their placing in the 2016 Fed Cup Asia/Oceania Zone Group I. Chinese Taipei advanced to World Group II play-offs, and Uzbekistan was relegated to the Asia/Oceania Zone Group II in 2017.

== Pool results ==
Placing	Pool A	Pool B
1	Japan	Chinese Taipei
2	Thailand	China
3	India	Kazakhstan
4	Uzbekistan	South Korea

== Promotion play-off ==
The first placed teams of the two pools were drawn in head-to-head rounds. The winner advanced to the World Group II play-offs.

=== Japan vs. Chinese Taipei ===
Japan
1
Hua Hin Centennial Sports Club, Hua Hin, Thailand
6 February 2016
Hard (outdoor)

Chinese Taipei
2

			1	2	3
1	(Japan) (Chinese Taipei)	Kurumi Nara; Chang Kai-chen	6; 1	6; 4
2	(Japan) (Chinese Taipei)	Nao Hibino; Hsieh Su-wei	6; 4	3; 6	3; 6
3	(Japan) (Chinese Taipei)	Shuko Aoyama / Eri Hozumi; Chan Hao-ching / Chan Yung-jan	3; 6	3; 6

== 3rd place play-off ==
The second placed teams of the two pools were drawn in head-to-head rounds to find third place teams.

=== Thailand vs. China ===
Thailand
1
Hua Hin Centennial Sports Club, Hua Hin, Thailand
6 February 2016
Hard (outdoor)

China
2

			1	2	3
1	(Thailand) (China)	Luksika Kumkhum; Wang Yafan	2; 6	7^{7} 6^{3}	2; 6
2	(Thailand) (China)	Peangtarn Plipuech; Wang Qiang	2; 6	6; 4	2; 6
3	(Thailand) (China)	Luksika Kumkhum / Peangtarn Plipuech; Liang Chen / Wang Qiang	5; 7	7^{7} 6^{2}	6; 4

== 5th place play-off ==
The third placed teams of the two pools were drawn in head-to-head rounds to find fifth place teams.

=== India vs. Kazakhstan ===
India
3
Hua Hin Centennial Sports Club, Hua Hin, Thailand
6 February 2016
Hard (outdoor)

Kazakhstan
0

			1	2	3
1	(India) (Kazakhstan)	Prerna Bhambri; Galina Voskoboeva	6; 2	4; 6	6; 2
2	(India) (Kazakhstan)	Ankita Raina; Yaroslava Shvedova	7^{7} 6^{2}	6; 0		retired
3	(India) (Kazakhstan)	Ankita Raina / Prarthana Thombare; Yaroslava Shvedova / Galina Voskoboeva	6; 0	6; 0		w/o

== Relegation play-off ==
The last placed teams of the two pools were drawn in head-to-head rounds. Uzbekistan was relegated to Asia/Oceania Zone Group II in 2017.

=== Uzbekistan vs. South Korea ===
Uzbekistan
0
Hua Hin Centennial Sports Club, Hua Hin, Thailand
6 February 2016
Hard (outdoor)

South Korea
3

			1	2	3
1	(Uzbekistan) (South Korea)	Arina Folts; Han Na-lae	0; 6	7^{8} 6^{6}	0; 6
2	(Uzbekistan) (South Korea)	Nigina Abduraimova; Jang Su-jeong	3; 6	0; 6
3	(Uzbekistan) (South Korea)	Nigina Abduraimova / Arina Folts; Han Na-lae / Jang Su-jeong	0; 6	0; 6		w/o

== Final placements ==
Placing	Teams
Promoted/First	Chinese Taipei
Second	Japan
Third	China
Fourth	Thailand
Fifth	India
Sixth	Kazakhstan
Seventh	South Korea
Relegated/Eighth	Uzbekistan

- Chinese Taipei advanced to World Group II play-offs.
- Uzbekistan was relegated to Asia/Oceania Group II in 2017.

== See also ==
- Fed Cup structure
