= 2016 Fed Cup Asia/Oceania Zone Group II – Pool A =

Pool A of the 2016 Fed Cup Asia/Oceania Group II was one of two pools in the Asia/Oceania Group II of the 2016 Fed Cup. Five teams competed in a round robin competition, with the top team and bottom teams proceeding to their respective sections of the play-offs: the top team played for advancement to Group I.

== Standings ==
		PHI	HKG	POC	IRI	BHR	RR; W–L	Set; W–L	Game; W–L	Standings
48	Philippines		2–1	2–1	3–0	2–0	4–0	18–4	119–58	1
61	Hong Kong	1–2		2–1	2–0	3–0	3–1	15–7	128–74	2
74	Pacific Oceania	1–2	1–2		3–0	3–0	2–2	16–9	121–71	3
77	Iran	0–3	0−2	0–3		3–0	1–3	7–16	67–101	4
NR	Bahrain	0–2	0–3	0–3	0–3		0–4	0–22	1–132	5

== Round-robin ==
=== Philippines vs. Iran ===
Philippines
3
True Arena Hua Hin, Hua Hin, Thailand
11 April 2016
Outdoor Hard

Iran
0

			1	2	3
1	(Philippines) (Iran)	Khim Iglupas; Sadaf Sadeghvaziri	6; 0	6; 0
2	(Philippines) (Iran)	Katharina Lehnert; Sara Amiri	6; 1	6; 4
3	(Philippines) (Iran)	Khim Iglupas / Anna Clarice Patrimonio; Sara Amiri / Sadaf Sadeghvaziri	6; 1	6; 4

=== Hong Kong vs. Pacific Oceania ===
Hong Kong
2
True Arena Hua Hin, Hua Hin, Thailand
11 April 2016
Outdoor Hard

Pacific Oceania
1

			1	2	3
1	(Hong Kong) (Pacific Oceania)	Maggie Ng; Abigail Tere-Apisah	6; 2	1; 6	5; 7
2	(Hong Kong) (Pacific Oceania)	Zhang Ling; Steffi Carruthers	7; 5	6; 3
3	(Hong Kong) (Pacific Oceania)	Sher Chun-wing / Zhang Ling; Steffi Carruthers / Abigail Tere-Apisah	6; 3	6; 2

=== Hong Kong vs. Bahrain ===
Hong Kong
3
True Arena Hua Hin, Hua Hin, Thailand
12 April 2016
Outdoor Hard

Bahrain
0

			1	2	3
1	(Hong Kong) (Bahrain)	Wu Ho-ching; Malak Jasim Fardan	6; 0	6; 0
2	(Hong Kong) (Bahrain)	Zhang Ling; Nazli Nader Redha	6; 0	6; 0
3	(Hong Kong) (Bahrain)	Maggie Ng / Sher Chun-wing; Nazli Nader Redha / Maram Mohamed Sharif	6; 0	6; 0

=== Pacific Oceania vs. Iran ===
Pacific Oceania
3
True Arena Hua Hin, Hua Hin, Thailand
12 April 2016
Outdoor Hard

Iran
0

			1	2	3
1	(Pacific Oceania) (Iran)	Abigail Tere-Apisah; Sadaf Sadeghvaziri	6; 1	6; 1
2	(Pacific Oceania) (Iran)	Steffi Carruthers; Sara Amiri	6; 0	6; 1
3	(Pacific Oceania) (Iran)	Ayana Rengiil / Mayka Zima; Sara Amiri / Ghazaleh Torkaman	6; 4	6; 2

=== Philippines vs. Pacific Oceania ===
Philippines
2
True Arena Hua Hin, Hua Hin, Thailand
13 April 2016
Outdoor Hard

Pacific Oceania
1

			1	2	3
1	(Philippines) (Pacific Oceania)	Anna Clarice Patrimonio; Abigail Tere-Apisah	1; 6	0; 6
2	(Philippines) (Pacific Oceania)	Katharina Lehnert; Steffi Carruthers	6; 0	6; 2
3	(Philippines) (Pacific Oceania)	Khim Iglupas / Katharina Lehnert; Steffi Carruthers / Abigail Tere-Apisah	6; 4	6; 3

=== Iran vs. Bahrain ===
Iran
3
True Arena Hua Hin, Hua Hin, Thailand
13 April 2016
Outdoor Hard

Bahrain
0

			1	2	3
1	(Iran) (Bahrain)	Sadaf Sadeghvaziri; Nazli Nader Redha	6; 0	6; 0
2	(Iran) (Bahrain)	Sara Amiri; Maram Mohamed Sharif	6; 0	6; 1
3	(Iran) (Bahrain)	Sara Amiri / Sadaf Sadeghvaziri; Malak Jasim Fardan / Maram Mohamed Sharif	6; 0	6; 0

=== Philippines vs. Hong Kong ===
Philippines
2
True Arena Hua Hin, Hua Hin, Thailand
14 April 2016
Outdoor Hard

Hong Kong
1

			1	2	3
1	(Philippines) (Hong Kong)	Khim Iglupas; Wu Ho-ching	6; 4	7; 5
2	(Philippines) (Hong Kong)	Katharina Lehnert; Zhang Ling	6; 1	6; 4
3	(Philippines) (Hong Kong)	Khim Iglupas / Anna Clarice Patrimonio; Maggie Ng / Sher Chun-wing	4; 6	5; 7

=== Pacific Oceania vs. Bahrain ===
Pacific Oceania
3
True Arena Hua Hin, Hua Hin, Thailand
14 April 2016
Outdoor Hard

Bahrain
0

			1	2	3
1	(Pacific Oceania) (Bahrain)	Mayka Zima; Malak Jasim Fardan	6; 0	6; 0
2	(Pacific Oceania) (Bahrain)	Ayana Rengiil; Nazli Nader Redha	6; 0	6; 0
3	(Pacific Oceania) (Bahrain)	Ayana Rengiil / Mayka Zima; Nazli Nader Redha / Maram Mohamed Sharif	6; 0	6; 0

=== Philippines vs. Bahrain ===
Philippines
2
True Arena Hua Hin, Hua Hin, Thailand
15 April 2016
Outdoor Hard

Bahrain
0

			1	2	3
1	(Philippines) (Bahrain)	Khim Iglupas; Nazli Nader Redha	6; 0	6; 0
2	(Philippines) (Bahrain)	Anna Clarice Patrimonio; Maram Mohamed Sharif	6; 0	6; 0
3	(Philippines) (Bahrain)	Khim Iglupas / Anna Clarice Patrimonio; Malak Jasim Fardan / Nazli Nader Redha				not played

=== Hong Kong vs. Iran ===
Hong Kong
2
True Arena Hua Hin, Hua Hin, Thailand
15 April 2016
Outdoor Hard

Iran
0

			1	2	3
1	(Hong Kong) (Iran)	Ng Man-ying; Sadaf Sadeghvaziri	6; 2	6; 0
2	(Hong Kong) (Iran)	Wu Ho-ching; Sara Amiri	6; 2	4; 6	6; 2
3	(Hong Kong) (Iran)	Maggie Ng / Sher Chun-wing; Sara Amiri / Ghazaleh Torkaman				not played

== See also ==
- Fed Cup structure
