= 2015 Fed Cup Asia/Oceania Zone =

Subsection of tennis competition

The Asia/Oceania Zone was one of three zones of regional competition in the 2015 Fed Cup.

== Group I ==
- Venue: Guangdong Olympic Tennis Centre, Guangzhou, China (outdoor hard)
- Dates: 4–7 February

=== Pools ===
	Pool A	JPN	KOR	UZB	HKG
1	Japan (3–0)		3–0	3–0	3–0
2	South Korea (2–1)	0–3		2–1	3–0
3	Uzbekistan (1–2)	0–3	1–2		3–0
4	Hong Kong (0–3)	0–3	0–3	0–3	

	Pool B	KAZ	CHN	THA	TPE
1	Kazakhstan (3–0)		2–1	2–1	2–1
2	China (2–1)	1–2		2–1	2–1
3	Thailand (1–2)	1–2	1–2		2–1
4	Chinese Taipei (0–3)	1–2	1–2	1–2	

=== Play-offs ===
Placing	A Team	Score	B Team
Promotion	Japan	2–0	Kazakhstan
3rd–4th	South Korea	2–1	China
5th–6th	Uzbekistan	0–2	Thailand
Relegation	Hong Kong	1–2	Chinese Taipei

- Japan was promoted to World Group II play-offs
- Hong Kong was relegated to Asia/Oceania Zone Group II in 2016

== Group II ==
- Venue: SAAP Tennis Complex, Hyderabad, India (outdoor hard)
- Dates: 14–18 April

=== Pools ===
	Pool A	PHI	SIN	N/A
1	Philippines (1–0)		3–0	N/A
2	Singapore (0–1)	0–3		N/A
3	N/A	N/A	N/A	

	Pool B	TKM	IRI	KGZ
1	Turkmenistan (2–0)		3–0	3–0
2	Iran (1–1)	0–3		3–0
3	Kyrgyzstan (0–2)	0–3	0–3	

	Pool C	IND	MAS	PAK
1	India (2–0)		3–0	3–0
2	Malaysia (1–1)	0–3		3–0
3	Pakistan (0–2)	0–3	0–3	

	Pool D	INA	POC	SRI
1	Indonesia (2–0)		3–0	3–0
2	Pacific Oceania (1–1)	0–3		3–0
3	Sri Lanka (0–2)	0–3	0–3	

=== 1st to 4th playoffs ===
Semifinals; 17 April
A	Philippines	2
D	Indonesia	1
B	Turkmenistan	0
C	India	2

Final; 18 April
A	Philippines	1
C	India	2

=== 5th to 10th playoffs ===
Placing	A Team	Score	D Team
5th–8th	Singapore	0–3	Pacific Oceania

Placing	B Team	Score	C Team
5th–8th	Iran	0–2	Malaysia
9th–10th	Kyrgyzstan	0–2	Pakistan

=== Final placements ===
Placing	Teams	
Promoted	India	
Second	Philippines	
Third	Indonesia	Turkmenistan
Fifth	Malaysia	Pacific Oceania
Seventh	Iran	Singapore
Ninth	Pakistan	
Tenth	Kyrgyzstan	
Eleventh	Sri Lanka	

- India advanced to Asia/Oceania Zone Group I in 2016.
