= Tennis at the 2017 SEA Games – Women's singles =

Women's singles
- Tennis at the 2017 SEA Games

Final
- Champion: Luksika Kumkhum (THA)
- Runner-up: Anna Clarice Patrimonio (PHI)
- Score: 6–0, 6–1

Events
Singles	men	women
Doubles	men	women	mixed
- SEA Games

Noppawan Lertcheewakarn were the defending champions, having won the event in 2015, but chose not to participate in this edition. Luksika Kumkhum won the gold medal, defeating Anna Clarice Patrimonio in the final, 6–0, 6–1. Stefanie Tan and Andrea Ka won the bronze medals.

== Medalists ==
Event	Gold	Silver	Bronze
Women's Singles	Luksika Kumkhum; Thailand	Anna Clarice Patrimonio; Philippines	Stefanie Tan; Singapore
Women's Singles	Luksika Kumkhum; Thailand	Anna Clarice Patrimonio; Philippines	Andrea Ka; Cambodia

== Seeds ==
1. Luksika Kumkhum (THA) (champion; Gold Medallist)
2. Bunyawi Thamchaiwat (THA) (first round)
3. Stefanie Tan (SGP) (semifinals; Bronze Medallist)
4. Andrea Ka (CAM) (semifinals; Bronze Medallist)

== Draw ==
Key

- Q = Qualifier
- WC = Wild card
- LL = Lucky loser
- Alt = Alternate
- ITF = ITF entry
- PR = Protected ranking
- SR = Special ranking
- SE = Special exempt
- JE = Junior exempt
- JR = Junior Accelerator Programme entrant
- CO = College Accelerator Programme entrant
- NG = Next Gen Accelerator Program entrant
- w/o = Walkover
- r = Retired
- d = Defaulted

First round
1	L Kumkhum (THA)	6	6
L Tananta (INA)	4	1
K Lehnert (PHI)	6	6
T Aung (MYA)	0	0
3	S Tan (SGP)	6	6
J Noordin (MAS)	0	2
TTT Trần (VIE)	6	6
C Som (CAM)	0	2
N Win (MYA)	4	2
A Chua (MAS)	6	6
NB Sĩ (VIE)	1	1
4	A Ka (CAM)	6	6
C Seah (SGP)	0	6	4
AC Patrimonio (PHI)	6	4	6
B Gumulya (INA)	6	1	6
2	B Thamchaiwat (THA)	2	6	4

Quarterfinals
1	L Kumkhum (THA)	6	6
K Lehnert (PHI)	1	3
3	S Tan (SGP)	6	6
TTT Trần (VIE)	0	0
A Chua (MAS)	0	3
4	A Ka (CAM)	6	6
AC Patrimonio (PHI)	7^{7}	4	6
B Gumulya (INA)	6^{4}	6	3

Semifinals
1	L Kumkhum (THA)	6	6
3	S Tan (SGP)	1	1
4	A Ka (CAM)	6^{5}	6^{5}
AC Patrimonio (PHI)	7^{7}	7^{7}

Final
1	L Kumkhum (THA)	6	6
AC Patrimonio (PHI)	0	1
