= 2016 Fed Cup Asia/Oceania Zone Group II – Pool B =

International sporting competition

Pool B of the 2016 Fed Cup Asia/Oceania Group II was one of two pools in the Asia/Oceania Group II of the 2016 Fed Cup. Six teams competed in a round robin competition, with the top team and bottom teams proceeding to their respective sections of the play-offs: the top team played for advancement to Group I.

== Standings ==
		INA	MAS	SIN	PAK	KGZ	SRI	RR; W–L	Set; W–L	Game; W–L	Standings
60	Indonesia		1–2	1–2	3–0	3–0	3–0	3–2	25–8	178–75	3
66	Malaysia	2–1		1–2	3–0	3–0	3–0	4–1	23–9	170–114	2
69	Singapore	2–1	2–1		2–1	1–2	2–1	4–1	21–15	165–146	1
82	Pakistan	0–3	0–3	1–2		3–0	0–2	1–4	5–21	63–138	5
85	Kyrgyzstan	0–3	0–3	2–1	0–3		0–3	1–4	4–26	56–155	6
86	Sri Lanka	0–3	0–3	1–2	2–0	3–0		2–3	13–14	103–107	4

== Round-robin ==
=== Indonesia vs. Sri Lanka ===
Indonesia
3
True Arena Hua Hin, Hua Hin, Thailand
11 April 2016
Outdoor Hard

Sri Lanka
0

			1	2	3
1	(Indonesia) (Sri Lanka)	Deria Nur Haliza; Amreetha Muttiah	6; 1	6; 2
2	(Indonesia) (Sri Lanka)	Beatrice Gumulya; Nethmi Himashi Waduge	6; 0	6; 0
3	(Indonesia) (Sri Lanka)	Jessy Rompies / Lavinia Tananta; Amreetha Muttiah / Medhira Samarasinghe	7^{7} 6^{3}	6; 0

=== Malaysia vs. Kyrgyzstan ===
Malaysia
3
True Arena Hua Hin, Hua Hin, Thailand
11 April 2016
Outdoor Hard

Kyrgyzstan
0

			1	2	3
1	(Malaysia) (Kyrgyzstan)	Theiviya Selvarajoo; Alina Lazareva	6; 3	6; 0
2	(Malaysia) (Kyrgyzstan)	Jawairiah Noordin; Nelli Buyuklianova	6; 0	6; 1
3	(Malaysia) (Kyrgyzstan)	Jawairiah Noordin / Nurin Nabilah Roslan; Nelli Buyuklianova / Alina Lazareva	6; 2	6; 1

=== Singapore vs. Pakistan ===
Singapore
2
True Arena Hua Hin, Hua Hin, Thailand
11 April 2016
Outdoor Hard

Pakistan
1

			1	2	3
1	(Singapore) (Pakistan)	Charmaine Shi Yi Seah; Sarah Mahboob Khan	6; 1	6; 2
2	(Singapore) (Pakistan)	Stefanie Tan; Ushna Suhail	6; 0	6; 3
3	(Singapore) (Pakistan)	Goh Yee-loon / Ashley Kei Yim; Sara Mansoor / Ushna Suhail	1; 6	6; 4	6^{2} 7^{7}

=== Indonesia vs. Kyrgyzstan ===
Indonesia
3
True Arena Hua Hin, Hua Hin, Thailand
12 April 2016
Outdoor Hard

Kyrgyzstan
0

			1	2	3
1	(Indonesia) (Kyrgyzstan)	Jessy Rompies; Alina Lazareva	6; 0	6; 0
2	(Indonesia) (Kyrgyzstan)	Beatrice Gumulya; Nelli Buyuklianova	6; 0	6; 0
3	(Indonesia) (Kyrgyzstan)	Deria Nur Haliza / Lavinia Tananta; Nelli Buyuklianova / Alina Lazareva	6; 0	6; 1

=== Malaysia vs. Pakistan ===
Malaysia
3
True Arena Hua Hin, Hua Hin, Thailand
12 April 2016
Outdoor Hard

Pakistan
0

			1	2	3
1	(Malaysia) (Pakistan)	Nurin Nabilah Roslan; Sara Mansoor	6; 3	6; 4
2	(Malaysia) (Pakistan)	Jawairiah Noordin; Ushna Suhail	6; 1	6; 2
3	(Malaysia) (Pakistan)	Jawairiah Noordin / Theiviya Selvarajoo; Sarah Mahboob Khan / Ushna Suhail	6; 3	6; 0

=== Singapore vs. Sri Lanka ===
Singapore
2
True Arena Hua Hin, Hua Hin, Thailand
12 April 2016
Outdoor Hard

Sri Lanka
1

			1	2	3
1	(Singapore) (Sri Lanka)	Charmaine Shi Yi Seah; Amreetha Muttiah	7; 5	6; 1
2	(Singapore) (Sri Lanka)	Stefanie Tan; Nethmi Himashi Waduge	6; 0	6; 0
3	(Singapore) (Sri Lanka)	Goh Yee-loon / Ashley Kei Yim; Amreetha Muttiah / Medhira Samarasinghe	1; 6	0; 6

=== Indonesia vs. Singapore ===
Indonesia
1
True Arena Hua Hin, Hua Hin, Thailand
13 April 2016
Outdoor Hard

Singapore
2

			1	2	3
1	(Indonesia) (Singapore)	Deria Nur Haliza; Charmaine Shi Yi Seah	6; 2	3; 6	4; 6
2	(Indonesia) (Singapore)	Beatrice Gumulya; Stefanie Tan	6; 4	1; 6	2; 6
3	(Indonesia) (Singapore)	Jessy Rompies / Lavinia Tananta; Goh Yee-loon / Ashley Kei Yim	6; 0	6; 0

=== Malaysia vs. Sri Lanka ===
Malaysia
3
True Arena Hua Hin, Hua Hin, Thailand
13 April 2016
Outdoor Hard

Sri Lanka
0

			1	2	3
1	(Malaysia) (Sri Lanka)	Theiviya Selvarajoo; Medhira Samarasinghe	6; 2	6; 2
2	(Malaysia) (Sri Lanka)	Jawairiah Noordin; Nethmi Himashi Waduge	6; 3	6; 0
3	(Malaysia) (Sri Lanka)	Nurin Nabilah Roslan / Theiviya Selvarajoo; Thisuri Molligoda / Amreetha Muttiah	3; 6	3; 2		retired

=== Pakistan vs. Kyrgyzstan ===
Pakistan
3
True Arena Hua Hin, Hua Hin, Thailand
13 April 2016
Outdoor Hard

Kyrgyzstan
0

			1	2	3
1	(Pakistan) (Kyrgyzstan)	Sara Mansoor; Alina Lazareva	6; 4	0; 0		retired
2	(Pakistan) (Kyrgyzstan)	Ushna Suhail; Nelli Buyuklianova	6; 1	6; 0
3	(Pakistan) (Kyrgyzstan)	Sarah Mahboob Khan / Ushna Suhail; Nelli Buyuklianova / Alina Lazareva				w/o

=== Indonesia vs. Pakistan ===
Indonesia
3
True Arena Hua Hin, Hua Hin, Thailand
14 April 2016
Outdoor Hard

Pakistan
0

			1	2	3
1	(Indonesia) (Pakistan)	Jessy Rompies; Sarah Mahboob Khan	6; 1	6; 1
2	(Indonesia) (Pakistan)	Lavinia Tananta; Sara Mansoor	6; 0	6; 0
3	(Indonesia) (Pakistan)	Beatrice Gumulya / Jessy Rompies; Sara Mansoor / Ushna Suhail	6; 1	6; 1

=== Malaysia vs. Singapore ===
Malaysia
1
True Arena Hua Hin, Hua Hin, Thailand
14 April 2016
Outdoor Hard

Singapore
2

			1	2	3
1	(Malaysia) (Singapore)	Theiviya Selvarajoo; Charmaine Shi Yi Seah	3; 6	7^{7} 6^{5}	6; 3
2	(Malaysia) (Singapore)	Jawairiah Noordin; Stefanie Tan	1; 6	3; 6
3	(Malaysia) (Singapore)	Jawairiah Noordin / Theiviya Selvarajoo; Charmaine Shi Yi Seah / Stefanie Tan	6; 3	6^{3} 7^{7}	5; 7

=== Kyrgyzstan vs. Sri Lanka ===
Kyrgyzstan
0
True Arena Hua Hin, Hua Hin, Thailand
14 April 2016
Outdoor Hard

Sri Lanka
3

			1	2	3
1	(Kyrgyzstan) (Sri Lanka)	Alina Lazareva; Amreetha Muttiah	0; 6	2; 6
2	(Kyrgyzstan) (Sri Lanka)	Nelli Buyuklianova; Nethmi Himashi Waduge	5; 7	1; 6
3	(Kyrgyzstan) (Sri Lanka)	Nelli Buyuklianova / Alina Lazareva; Amreetha Muttiah / Medhira Samarasinghe	0; 6	1; 6

=== Indonesia vs. Malaysia ===
Indonesia
1
True Arena Hua Hin, Hua Hin, Thailand
15 April 2016
Outdoor Hard

Malaysia
2

			1	2	3
1	(Indonesia) (Malaysia)	Lavinia Tananta; Nurin Nabilah Roslan	6; 0	6; 1
2	(Indonesia) (Malaysia)	Beatrice Gumulya; Jawairiah Noordin	7; 5	2; 6	4; 6
3	(Indonesia) (Malaysia)	Beatrice Gumulya / Jessy Rompies; Jawairiah Noordin / Theiviya Selvarajoo	4; 6	6^{5} 7^{7}

=== Singapore vs. Kyrgyzstan ===
Singapore
1
True Arena Hua Hin, Hua Hin, Thailand
15 April 2016
Outdoor Hard

Kyrgyzstan
2

			1	2	3
1	(Singapore) (Kyrgyzstan)	Ashley Kei Yim; Alina Lazareva	6; 1	6; 4
2	(Singapore) (Kyrgyzstan)	Goh Yee-loon; Nelli Buyuklianova	0; 6	2; 6
3	(Singapore) (Kyrgyzstan)	Goh Yee-loon / Ashley Kei Yim; Nelli Buyuklianova / Alina Lazareva	5; 7	6; 4	3; 6

=== Pakistan vs. Sri Lanka ===
Pakistan
0
True Arena Hua Hin, Hua Hin, Thailand
15 April 2016
Outdoor Hard

Sri Lanka
2

			1	2	3
1	(Pakistan) (Sri Lanka)	Sara Mansoor; Amreetha Muttiah	3; 6	0; 6
2	(Pakistan) (Sri Lanka)	Ushna Suhail; Nethmi Himashi Waduge	0; 6	2; 6
3	(Pakistan) (Sri Lanka)	Sarah Mahboob Khan / Ushna Suhail; Amreetha Muttiah / Medhira Samarasinghe				not played

== See also ==
- Fed Cup structure
