= 2015 Fed Cup Asia/Oceania Zone Group I – play-offs =

The play-offs of the 2015 Fed Cup Asia/Oceania Zone Group I were the final stages of the Group I Zonal Competition involving teams from Asia and Oceania. Using the positions determined in their pools, the eight teams faced off to determine their placing in the 2015 Fed Cup Asia/Oceania Zone Group I. Japan advanced to World Group II play-offs, and Hong Kong relegated to the Asia/Oceania Zone Group II.

== Pool results ==
Placing	Pool A	Pool B
1	Japan	Kazakhstan
2	South Korea	China
3	Uzbekistan	Thailand
4	Hong Kong	Chinese Taipei

== Promotion play-off ==
The first placed teams of the two pools were drawn in head-to-head rounds. The winner advanced to the World Group II play-offs.

=== Japan vs. Kazakhstan ===
Japan
2
Guangdong Olympic Tennis Centre, Guangzhou, China
7 February 2015
Hard

Kazakhstan
0

			1	2	3
1	(Japan) (Kazakhstan)	Misaki Doi; Yulia Putintseva	6; 1	6; 3
2	(Japan) (Kazakhstan)	Kurumi Nara; Yaroslava Shvedova	2; 6	7^{7} 6^{4}	6; 2
3	(Japan) (Kazakhstan)	Shuko Aoyama / Eri Hozumi; Zarina Diyas / Yaroslava Shvedova				not played

== 3rd place play-off ==
The second placed teams of the two pools were drawn in head-to-head rounds to find third place teams.

=== South Korea vs. China ===
South Korea
2
Guangdong Olympic Tennis Centre, Guangzhou, China
7 February 2015
Hard

China
1

			1	2	3
1	(South Korea) (China)	Lee So-ra; Wang Qiang	2; 6	2; 6
2	(South Korea) (China)	Choi Ji-hee; Zheng Saisai	2; 2			retired
3	(South Korea) (China)	Han Na-lae / Jang Su-jeong; Wang Qiang / Zheng Saisai				w/o

== 5th place play-off ==
The third placed teams of the two pools were drawn in head-to-head rounds to find fifth place teams.

=== Uzbekistan vs. Thailand ===
Uzbekistan
0
Guangdong Olympic Tennis Centre, Guangzhou, China
7 February 2015
Hard

Thailand
2

			1	2	3
1	(Uzbekistan) (Thailand)	Sabina Sharipova; Tamarine Tanasugarn	1; 6	6^{5} 7^{7}
2	(Uzbekistan) (Thailand)	Nigina Abduraimova; Luksika Kumkhum	6; 4	4; 6	2; 6
3	(Uzbekistan) (Thailand)	Arina Folts / Sabina Sharipova; Nicha Lertpitaksinchai / Peangtarn Plipuech				not played

== Relegation play-off ==
The last placed teams of the two pools were drawn in head-to-head rounds. The loser was relegated down to Asia/Oceania Zone Group II in 2016.

=== Hong Kong vs. Chinese Taipei ===
Hong Kong
1
Guangdong Olympic Tennis Centre, Guangzhou, China
7 February 2015
Hard

Chinese Taipei
2

			1	2	3
1	(Hong Kong) (Chinese Taipei)	Wu Ho-ching; Chan Yung-jan	1; 6	3; 6
2	(Hong Kong) (Chinese Taipei)	Zhang Ling; Hsieh Su-wei	6; 3	4; 6	3; 6
3	(Hong Kong) (Chinese Taipei)	Maggie Ng / Sher Chun-wing; Chan Yung-jan / Lee Ya-hsuan	2; 6	0; 1		retired

== Final placements ==
Placing	Teams
Promoted	Japan
Second	Kazakhstan
Third	South Korea
Fourth	China
Fifth	Thailand
Sixth	Uzbekistan
Seventh	Chinese Taipei
Relegated	Hong Kong

- Japan advanced to World Group II play-offs.
- Hong Kong were relegated to Asia/Oceania Group II in 2016.

== See also ==
- Fed Cup structure
