= Maggie Ng =

Hong Kong tennis player (born 1996)

Maggie Ng 伍曼瑩
- Full name: Man Ying Maggie Ng
- Country (sports): Hong Kong
- Born: 28 March 1996 (age 29)
- Plays: Right-handed (two-handed backhand)
- Prize money: $32,510

Singles
- Career record: 80–195
- Highest ranking: No. 640 (10 June 2019)

Doubles
- Career record: 61–88
- Career titles: 2 ITF
- Highest ranking: No. 657 (7 November 2022)
- Current ranking: No. 980 (28 October 2024)

Team competitions
- Fed Cup: 10–4
- Last updated on: 28 October 2024.

Maggie Ng (born 28 March 1996) is a Hong Kong female tennis player.

Ng has a career-high singles ranking by the WTA of 640, achieved on 10 June 2019. She also has a career-high WTA doubles ranking of 657, achieved on 7 November 2022.

Playing for Hong Kong in Fed Cup, she has a career win/loss record of 10–4.

In 2018, Maggie Ng won Prudential Hong Kong National Tennis Championships singles and doubles.

At the 2019 Summer Universiade held in Naples, Italy, she won a bronze medal in women's doubles, along with Eudice Chong.

Her first WTA Tour main-draw appearance came at the 2015 Hong Kong Open where she partnered with Ki Yan-tung in the doubles event.

Maggie Ng
Medal record

Representing Hong Kong

Women's Tennis

Summer Universiade
Bronze medal – third place	2019 Naples	Doubles

== ITF Circuit finals ==
=== Singles: 1 (runner–up) ===
Legend W15 tournaments	Finals by surface Hard (0–1)

Result	W–L	Date	Tournament	Tier	Surface	Opponent	Score
Loss	0–1	Dec 2018	ITF Djibouti	W15	Hard	(Netherlands) Noa Liauw a Fong	2–6, 2–6

=== Doubles: 7 (2 titles, 5 runner–ups) ===
Legend W15 tournaments	Finals by surface Hard (2–5)

Result	W–L	Date	Tournament	Tier	Surface	Partner	Opponents	Score
Loss	0–1	Dec 2018	ITF Djibouti City	W15	Hard	(Germany) Patricia Böntgen	(Gabon) Célestine Avomo Ella (Serbia) Elena Gemović	4–6, 1–6
Loss	0–2	Feb 2020	ITF Hamilton, New Zealand	W15	Hard	(United States) Sabastiani León	(New Zealand) Emily Fanning (New Zealand) Erin Routliffe	3–6, 1–6
Loss	0–3	Nov 2021	ITF Monastir, Tunisia	W15	Hard	(South Korea) Cherry Kim	(Japan) Natsuho Arakawa (Japan) Lisa-Marie Rioux	6–2, 1–6, 6–10
Win	1–3	Dec 2021	ITF Monastir, Tunisia	W15	Hard	(Spain) Celia Cerviño Ruiz	(Switzerland) Jenny Dürst (Hong Kong) Cody Wong	6–2, 6–4
Win	2–3	Dec 2021	ITF Monastir, Tunisia	W15	Hard	(Russia) Ksenia Laskutova	(Lithuania) Andrė Lukošiūtė (United Kingdom) Eliz Maloney	7–5, 6–3
Loss	2–4	Apr 2022	ITF Chiang Rai, Thailand	W15	Hard	(Hong Kong) Wu Ho-ching	(China) Gao Xinyu (China) Xun Fangying	3–6, 6–7^{(4)}
Loss	2–5	Oct 2023	ITF Hua Hin, Thailand	W15	Hard	(China) Cao Yajing	(Thailand) Anchisa Chanta (Japan) Ayumi Koshiishi	6–4, 4–6, [5-10]

== Team competition ==
=== Fed Cup ===
==== Singles (2–1) ====
Result	W–L	Date	Tournament	Group	Surface	Team	Opponent	Score
Loss	0–1	Apr 2016	2016 Fed Cup Asia/Oceania	Group II	Hard	Pacific Oceania	(Papua New Guinea) Abigail Tere-Apisah	6–2, 1–6, 5–7
Win	1–1	Apr 2016	2016 Fed Cup Asia/Oceania	Group II	Hard	Iran	(Iran) Sadaf Sadeghvaziri	6–2, 6–0
Win	2–1	Apr 2016	2016 Fed Cup Asia/Oceania	Group II	Hard	Malaysia	(Malaysia) Theiviya Selvarajoo	6–2, 6–0

==== Doubles (4–3) ====
Result	W–L	Date	Tournament	Group	Surface	Partner	Team	Opponents	Score
Loss	0–1	Feb 2015	2015 Fed Cup Asia/Oceania	Group I	Hard	(Hong Kong) Sher Chun-wing	Uzbekistan	(Uzbekistan) Arina Folts (Uzbekistan) Sabina Sharipova	3–6, 7–6^{(2)}, 4–6
Loss	0–2	Feb 2015	2015 Fed Cup Asia/Oceania	Group I	Hard	(Hong Kong) Sher Chun-wing	Japan	(Japan) Shuko Aoyama (Japan) Eri Hozumi	1–6, 1–6
Loss	0–3	Feb 2015	2015 Fed Cup Asia/Oceania	Group I	Hard	(Hong Kong) Sher Chun-wing	South Korea	(South Korea) Choi Ji-hee (South Korea) Lee So-ra	3–6, 2–6
Win	1–3	Feb 2015	2015 Fed Cup Asia/Oceania	Group I	Hard	(Hong Kong) Sher Chun-wing	Taiwan	(Chinese Taipei) Latisha Chan (Chinese Taipei) Lee Ya-hsuan	2–6, 0–1 ret.
Win	2–3	Apr 2016	2016 Fed Cup Asia/Oceania	Group II	Hard	(Hong Kong) Sher Chun-wing	Bahrain	(Bahrain) Nazlı Nader Redha (Bahrain) Maram Mohamed Sharif	6–0, 6–0
Win	3–3	Apr 2016	2016 Fed Cup Asia/Oceania	Group II	Hard	(Hong Kong) Sher Chun-wing	Philippines	(Philippines) Khim Iglupas (Philippines) Anna Clarice Patrimonio	6–4, 7–5
Win	4–3	Apr 2016	2016 Fed Cup Asia/Oceania	Group II	Hard	(Hong Kong) Sher Chun-wing	Malaysia	(Malaysia) Jawairiah Noordin (Malaysia) Theiviya Selvarajoo	6–3, 7–6^{(4)}
