= 2015 Fed Cup Asia/Oceania Zone Group II – Pool C =

Pool C of the 2015 Fed Cup Asia/Oceania Group II was one of four pools in the Asia/Oceania Group II of the 2015 Fed Cup. Three teams competed in a round robin competition, with the top team and bottom teams proceeding to their respective sections of the play-offs: the top team played for advancement to Group I.

== Standings ==
		IND	MAS	PAK	RR; W–L	Set; W–L	Game; W–L	Standings
68	India		3–0	3–0	6–0	12–1	75–20	1
74	Malaysia	0–3		3–0	3–3	7–6	50–51	2
88	Pakistan	0–3	0–3		0–6	0–12	18–72	3

== Round-robin ==
=== Malaysia vs. Pakistan ===
Malaysia
3
SAAP Tennis Complex, Hyderabad, India
14 April 2015
Hard

Pakistan
0

			1	2	3
1	(Malaysia) (Pakistan)	Theiviya Selvarajoo; Iman Qureshi	6; 4	6; 4
2	(Malaysia) (Pakistan)	Jawairiah Noordin; Ushna Suhail	6; 2	6; 0
3	(Malaysia) (Pakistan)	Jawairiah Noordin / Yus Syazlin Nabila Binti Yusri; Sara Mansoor / Ushna Suhail	6; 0	6; 2

=== India vs. Pakistan ===
India
3
SAAP Tennis Complex, Hyderabad, India
15 April 2015
Hard

Pakistan
0

			1	2	3
1	(India) (Pakistan)	Prarthana Thombare; Sara Mansoor	6; 1	6; 0
2	(India) (Pakistan)	Ankita Raina; Ushna Suhail	6; 0	6; 1
3	(India) (Pakistan)	Natasha Palha / Prarthana Thombare; Iman Qureshi / Ushna Suhail	6; 0	6; 4

=== India vs. Malaysia ===
India
3
SAAP Tennis Complex, Hyderabad, India
16 April 2015
Hard

Malaysia
0

			1	2	3
1	(India) (Malaysia)	Prarthana Thombare; Yus Syazlin Nabila Binti Yusri	6; 1	6; 0
2	(India) (Malaysia)	Ankita Raina; Jawairiah Noordin	6; 1	3; 6	6; 4
3	(India) (Malaysia)	Natasha Palha / Prarthana Thombare; Theiviya Selvarajoo / Yus Syazlin Nabila Binti Yusri	6; 0	6; 2

== See also ==
- Fed Cup structure
