= Steffi Carruthers =

Samoan tennis player

- Full name: Steffi Faasusivaitele Hethrington Carruthers
- Country (sports): Samoa; Pacific Oceania (Fed Cup)
- Born: 24 May 1993 (age 32); Apia, Samoa
- Plays: Right (two-handed backhand)
- Prize money: $20,223

Singles
- Career record: 88–105
- Highest ranking: No. 662 (13 October 2014)

Doubles
- Career record: 42–67
- Career titles: 2 ITF
- Highest ranking: No. 556 (16 November 2015)

Team competitions
- Fed Cup: 11–11

Steffi Faasusivaitele Hearthington Carruthers (born 24 May 1993) is a Samoan former tennis player. She is the first Samoan woman to play professional tennis and the first Pacific Oceanian player to win a professional tournament.

Carruthers is from the village of Vailima, and was educated at Vaiala Beach School and Samoa College. and has played tennis since the age of 5, and competed in her first international tournament at the age of 10. She is named after German tennis player Steffi Graf.

Carruthers has career-high WTA rankings of 662 in singles and 556 in doubles. In her career, she won two ITF titles in doubles.

Playing for Pacific Oceania in Fed Cup, Carruthers has a win-loss record of 11–11.

Carruthers began training to become a professional in 2012, and played her first professional season in 2014. She later competed in the 2017 Pacific Mini Games in Port Vila, Vanuatu, winning gold in the doubles, gold in the singles, silver in the mixed doubles, and bronze in the women's team events. At the 2019 Pacific Games in Apia she won silver in the women's team event.

In 2016 she was nominated as Sports Woman of the Year in the annual SASNOC sports awards.

== ITF finals ==
=== Doubles (2–1) ===
Legend $100,000 tournaments $75,000 tournaments $50,000 tournaments $25,000 tournaments $15,000 tournaments $10,000 tournaments	Finals by surface Hard (1–1) Clay (1–0) Grass (0–0) Carpet (0–0)

Result	No.	Date	Tournament	Surface	Partner	Opponents	Score
Win	1.	6 June 2015	ITF Manzanillo, Mexico	Hard	(Mexico) Carolina Betancourt	(United States) Tornado Alicia Black (United States) Dasha Ivanova	6–3, 6–3
Win	2.	12 September 2015	ITF Bol, Croatia	Clay	(Russia) Alina Silich	(Slovakia) Barbara Kotelesova (Slovenia) Natalija Sipek	7–6^{(3)}, 3–6, [10–5]
Loss	1.	6 November 2015	GB Pro-Series Loughborough, United Kingdom	Hard	(Mexico) Sabastiani Leon	(United Kingdom) Freya Christie (United Kingdom) Lisa Whybourn	1–6, 2–6

== ITF Junior Circuit finals ==
Category G1
Category G2
Category G3
Category G4
Category G5

=== Singles (0–1) ===
Result	No.	Date	Tournament	Surface	Opponent	Score
Loss	1.	2 October 2010	Auckland, New Zealand	Hard	(New Caledonia) Anaève Pain	1–6, 0–6

=== Doubles (5–3) ===
Result	No.	Date	Tournament	Surface	Partner	Opponents	Score
Loss	1.	27 June 2008	Nouméa, New Caledonia	Hard	(New Caledonia) Anaève Pain	(Papua New Guinea) Abigail Tere-Apisah (Australia) Harriet Sheahan	6–7^{(6)}, 6–0, 1–6
Win	2.	5 July 2008	Lautoka, Fiji	Hard	(New Caledonia) Anaève Pain	(Singapore) Celina Goetti (Indonesia) Athena Nathalia	6–2, 7–6^{(5)}
Win	3.	31 January 2009	Christchurch, New Zealand	Hard	(New Caledonia) Anaève Pain	(New Zealand) Leela Beattie (Australia) Gabrielle Grady	5–7, 6–2, [10–4]
Loss	4.	19 July 2009	Darwin, Australia	Hard	(Papua New Guinea) Abigail Tere-Apisah	(Japan) Miyu Kato (Japan) Risa Ozaki	3–6, 6–3, [9–11]
Win	5.	26 June 2010	Nouméa, New Caledonia	Hard	(Australia) Emily Burns	(Japan) Kaede Amano (Japan) Asuka Sakamoto	6–2, 6–3
Loss	6.	4 July 2010	Lautoka, Fiji	Hard	(New Caledonia) Anaève Pain	(New Zealand) Emily Fanning (New Zealand) Heidi Stewart	1–6, 0–6
Win	7.	25 September 2010	Hamilton, New Zealand	Hard	(New Caledonia) Anaève Pain	(New Zealand) Paige Hourigan (New Zealand) Claudia Williams	6–4, 6–1
Win	8.	2 October 2010	Auckland, New Zealand	Hard	(New Caledonia) Anaève Pain	(New Zealand) Carli Davis (New Zealand) Danielle Feneridis	6–2, 6–4

== Fed Cup participation ==
=== Singles (4–5) ===
Edition	Round	Date	Location	Against	Surface	Opponent	W/L	Score
2015 Fed Cup; Asia/Oceania Zone Group II	R/R	14 April 2015	Hyderabad, India	Indonesia	Hard (i)	(Indonesia) Deria Nur Haliza	L	2–6, 0–6
2015 Fed Cup; Asia/Oceania Zone Group II	R/R	15 April 2015	Hyderabad, India	Sri Lanka	Hard (i)	(Sri Lanka) Thisuri Molligoda	W	6–2, 6–7^{(5)}, 6–1
2015 Fed Cup; Asia/Oceania Zone Group II	P/O	17 April 2015	Hyderabad, India	Singapore	Hard (i)	(Singapore) Wee Khee-yen	W	6–2, 6–0
2016 Fed Cup; Asia/Oceania Zone Group II	R/R	11 April 2016	Hua Hin, Thailand	Hong Kong	Hard	(Hong Kong) Zhang Ling	L	5–7, 3–6
2016 Fed Cup; Asia/Oceania Zone Group II	R/R	12 April 2016	Hua Hin, Thailand	Iran	Hard	(Iran) Sara Amiri	W	6–0, 6–1
2016 Fed Cup; Asia/Oceania Zone Group II	R/R	13 April 2016	Hua Hin, Thailand	Philippines	Hard	(Philippines) Katharina Lehnert	L	0–6, 2–6
2016 Fed Cup; Asia/Oceania Zone Group II	P/O	16 April 2016	Hua Hin, Thailand	Indonesia	Hard	(Indonesia) Deria Nur Haliza	L	3–6, 1–6
2017 Fed Cup; Asia/Oceania Zone Group II	R/R	19 July 2017	Dushanbe, Tajikistan	Iran	Hard	(Iran) Yasmin Mansouri	W	6–4, 6–2
2017 Fed Cup; Asia/Oceania Zone Group II	R/R	20 July 2017	Dushanbe, Tajikistan	Hong Kong	Hard	(Hong Kong) Eudice Chong	L	5–7, 3–6

=== Doubles (1–2) ===
Edition	Round	Date	Location	Against	Surface	Partner	Opponents	W/L	Score
2015 Fed Cup; Asia/Oceania Zone Group II	R/R	15 April 2015	Hyderabad, India	Sri Lanka	Hard (i)	(New Zealand) Brittany Teei	(Sri Lanka) Amreetha Muttiah (Sri Lanka) Medhira Samarasinghe	W	6–3, 3–6, 6–3
2016 Fed Cup; Asia/Oceania Zone Group II	R/R	11 April 2016	Hua Hin, Thailand	Hong Kong	Hard	(Papua New Guinea) Abigail Tere-Apisah	(Hong Kong) Sher Chun-wing (Hong Kong) Zhang Ling	L	3–6, 2–6
2016 Fed Cup; Asia/Oceania Zone Group II	R/R	13 April 2016	Hua Hin, Thailand	Philippines	Hard	(Papua New Guinea) Abigail Tere-Apisah	(Philippines) Khim Iglupas (Philippines) Katharina Lehnert	L	4–6, 3–6
