= 2015 Fed Cup Asia/Oceania Zone Group II – Pool A =

Pool A of the 2015 Fed Cup Asia/Oceania Group II was one of four pools in the Asia/Oceania Group II of the 2015 Fed Cup. Three teams competed in a round robin competition, with the top team and bottom teams proceeding to their respective sections of the play-offs: the top team played for advancement to Group I.

== Standings ==
		PHI	SIN	N/A	RR; W–L	Set; W–L	Game; W–L	Standings
55	Philippines		3–0	N/A	3–0	6–0	38–15	1
71	Singapore	0–3		N/A	0–3	0–6	15–38	2
N/A	N/A	N/A	N/A		N/A	N/A	N/A	N/A

== Round-robin ==
=== Philippines vs. Singapore ===
Philippines
3
SAAP Tennis Complex, Hyderabad, India
15 April 2015
Hard

Singapore
0

			1	2	3
1	(Philippines) (Singapore)	Anna Clarice Patrimonio; Angeline Devi Devanthiran	7^{7} 6^{5}	7; 5
2	(Philippines) (Singapore)	Katharina Lehnert; Wee Khee-yen	6; 1	6; 0
3	(Philippines) (Singapore)	Katharina Lehnert / Anna Clarice Patrimonio; Angeline Devi Devanthiran / Sarah Pang	6; 1	6; 2

== See also ==
- Fed Cup structure
