= Andrea Ka =

Cambodian tennis player (born 1992)

- Full name: Andrea Daravy Ka
- Country (sports): Cambodia (2014–present); France (2009–10)
- Born: 25 April 1992 (age 34) Nogent-sur-Marne, France
- Plays: Right (two-handed backhand)
- Prize money: $26,113

Singles
- Career record: 78–68
- Career titles: 2 ITF
- Highest ranking: No. 560 (12 June 2017)

Doubles
- Career record: 60–50
- Career titles: 7 ITF
- Highest ranking: No. 466 (24 September 2018)

Andrea Daravy Ka (born 25 April 1992) is a Cambodian former tennis player.

Ka has career-high WTA rankings of 560 in singles, reached in June 2018, and 466 in doubles, achieved on 24 September 2018. She is the first Cambodian tennis player to win an ITF tennis tournament.

In 2017, Ka won a bronze medal in the women's singles event at the 2017 Southeast Asian Games. She also represented Cambodia at the 2014 Asian Games in Incheon.

== ITF Circuit finals ==
=== Singles: 2 (2 titles) ===
Legend $10,000 tournaments	Finals by surface Hard (2–0)

Result	W–L	Date	Tournament	Tier	Surface	Opponent	Score
Win	1–0	Jul 2016	ITF Amarante, Portugal	10,000	Hard	(Spain) Alba Carrillo Marín	3–6, 7–6^{(6)}, 7–5
Win	2–0	Dec 2016	ITF Hua Hin, Thailand	10,000	Hard	(Chinese Taipei) Hsu Chieh-yu	4–6, 6–0, 7–6^{(0)}

=== Doubles: 11 (7 titles, 4 runner–ups) ===
Legend $15,000 tournaments $10,000 tournaments	Finals by surface Hard (4–3) Clay (3–1)

Result	W–L	Date	Tournament	Tier	Surface	Partner	Opponents	Score
Win	1–0	Oct 2009	ITF Clermont-Ferrand, France	10,000	Hard (i)	(France) Audrey Bergot	(Switzerland) Lucia Kovarčíková (Belgium) Davinia Lobbinger	6–2, 6–2
Win	2–0	Nov 2010	ITF Le Havre, France	10,000	Clay (i)	(France) Céline Ghesquière	(Belgium) Michaela Boev (Romania) Laura Ioana Paar	7–5, 7–5
Win	3–0	Jun 2016	ITF Oeiras, Portugal	10,000	Clay	(France) Laëtitia Sarrazin	(Brazil) Carolina Alves (Argentina) Victoria Bosio	4–6, 7–5, [10–3]
Loss	3–1	Sep 2016	ITF Ponta Delgada, Portugal	10,000	Hard	(Germany) Katharina Hering	(Portugal) Inês Murta (Romania) Ioana Loredana Roșca	6–2, 4–6, [9–11]
Win	4–1	Sep 2016	ITF Ponta Delgada, Portugal	10,000	Hard	(Germany) Katharina Hering	(United States) Desirae Krawczyk (Russia) Elina Vikhrianova	6–3, 6–3
Win	5–1	Nov 2016	ITF Heraklion, Greece	10,000	Hard	(Belgium) Michaela Boev	(Belgium) Steffi Distelmans (Israel) Vlada Katic	6–4, 6–4
Loss	5–2	Oct 2017	ITF Colombo, Sri Lanka	15,000	Clay	(France) Joséphine Boualem	(Canada) Isabelle Boulais (China) Ma Yexin	3–6, 6–2, [5–10]
Win	6–2	May 2018	ITF Hammamet, Tunisia	15,000	Clay	(Italy) Verena Hofer	(Moldova) Vitalia Stamat (Russia) Maria Zotova	1–6, 6–2, [10–8]
Win	7–2	Jul 2018	ITF Corroios, Portugal	15,000	Hard	(United Kingdom) Eden Silva	(Portugal) Francisca Jorge (Spain) María José Luque Moreno	3–6, 6–1, [10–5]
Loss	7–3	Sep 2018	ITF Monastir, Tunisia	15,000	Hard	(Tunisia) Chiraz Bechri	(Spain) Paula Arias Manjón (Spain) Andrea Lázaro García	1–6, 0–6
Loss	7–4	Mar 2019	ITF Monastir, Tunisia	15,000	Hard	(Portugal) Francisca Jorge	(France) Loudmilla Bencheikh (France) Lou Brouleau	3–6, 4–6
