= 2016 Fed Cup Asia/Oceania Zone Group I – Pool B =

Pool B of the 2016 Fed Cup Asia/Oceania Zone Group I was one of two pools in the Asia/Oceania zone of the 2016 Fed Cup. Four teams competed in a round robin competition, with the top team and the bottom team proceeding to their respective sections of the play-offs: the top team played for advancement to the World Group II Play-offs, while the bottom team faced potential relegation to Group II.

== Standings ==
		(Kazakhstan) KAZ	(China) CHN	(South Korea) KOR	(Chinese Taipei) TPE	RR; W–L	Set; W–L	Game; W–L	Standings; W–L
22	Kazakhstan		0–3	3–0	1–2	1–2	9–10	83–87	3
27	China	3–0		2–1	1–2	2–1	15–8	122–84	2
32	South Korea	0–3	1–2		1–2	0–3	5–15	74–114	4
49	Chinese Taipei	2–1	2–1	2–1		3–0	13–9	114–108	1

== Round-robin ==
=== Kazakhstan vs. South Korea ===
Kazakhstan
3
Hua Hin Centennial Sports Club, Hua Hin, Thailand
3 February 2016
Hard (outdoor)

South Korea
0

			1	2	3
1	(Kazakhstan) (South Korea)	Yaroslava Shvedova; Han Na-lae	7; 5	6; 3
2	(Kazakhstan) (South Korea)	Zarina Diyas; Jang Su-jeong	6; 1	6; 3
3	(Kazakhstan) (South Korea)	Yaroslava Shvedova / Galina Voskoboeva; Han Na-lae / Lee So-ra	6; 2	6; 3

=== China vs. Chinese Taipei ===
China
1
Hua Hin Centennial Sports Club, Hua Hin, Thailand
3 February 2016
Hard (outdoor)

Chinese Taipei
2

			1	2	3
1	(China) (Chinese Taipei)	Wang Qiang; Chang Kai-chen	3; 6	6; 3	4; 6
2	(China) (Chinese Taipei)	Zheng Saisai; Hsieh Su-wei	7^{7} 6^{5}	5; 7	3; 6
3	(China) (Chinese Taipei)	Liang Chen / Wang Yafan; Chan Hao-ching / Chan Yung-jan	6; 3	5; 7	6; 0

=== Kazakhstan vs. Chinese Taipei ===
Kazakhstan
1
Hua Hin Centennial Sports Club, Hua Hin, Thailand
4 February 2016
Hard (outdoor)

Chinese Taipei
2

			1	2	3
1	(Kazakhstan) (Chinese Taipei)	Yaroslava Shvedova; Chang Kai-chen	6; 4	6^{2} 7^{7}	6^{4} 7^{7}
2	(Kazakhstan) (Chinese Taipei)	Zarina Diyas; Hsieh Su-wei	6; 3	6; 1
3	(Kazakhstan) (Chinese Taipei)	Yaroslava Shvedova / Galina Voskoboeva; Chan Hao-ching / Chan Yung-jan	4; 6	0; 6

=== China vs. South Korea ===
China
2
Hua Hin Centennial Sports Club, Hua Hin, Thailand
4 February 2016
Hard (outdoor)

South Korea
1

			1	2	3
1	(China) (South Korea)	Wang Yafan; Han Na-lae	6; 3	2; 6	5; 7
2	(China) (South Korea)	Wang Qiang; Jang Su-jeong	6; 3	4; 6	6; 0
3	(China) (South Korea)	Liang Chen / Wang Yafan; Han Na-lae / Lee So-ra	6; 2	6; 1

=== Kazakhstan vs. China ===
Kazakhstan
0
Hua Hin Centennial Sports Club, Hua Hin, Thailand
5 February 2016
Hard (outdoor)

China
3

			1	2	3
1	(Kazakhstan) (China)	Galina Voskoboeva; Wang Qiang	2; 6	2; 6
2	(Kazakhstan) (China)	Yulia Putintseva; Zheng Saisai	3; 6	3; 6
3	(Kazakhstan) (China)	Yaroslava Shvedova / Galina Voskoboeva; Liang Chen / Wang Yafan	2; 3			retired

=== South Korea vs. Chinese Taipei ===
South Korea
1
Hua Hin Centennial Sports Club, Hua Hin, Thailand
5 February 2016
Hard (outdoor)

Chinese Taipei
2

			1	2	3
1	(South Korea) (Chinese Taipei)	Han Na-lae; Chang Kai-chen	7^{7} 6^{1}	6; 4
2	(South Korea) (Chinese Taipei)	Jang Su-jeong; Hsieh Su-wei	6^{5} 7^{7}	2; 6
3	(South Korea) (Chinese Taipei)	Han Na-lae / Jang Su-jeong; Chan Hao-ching / Chan Yung-jan	3; 6	5; 7
