= 2015 Fed Cup Asia/Oceania Zone Group II – Pool D =

Pool D of the 2015 Fed Cup Asia/Oceania Group II was one of four pools in the Asia/Oceania Group II of the 2015 Fed Cup. Three teams competed in a round robin competition, with the top team and bottom teams proceeding to their respective sections of the play-offs: the top team played for advancement to Group I.

== Standings ==
		INA	SRI	POC	RR; W–L	Set; W–L	Game; W–L	Standings
70	Indonesia		3–0	3–0	6–0	12–1	74–18	1
83	Sri Lanka	0–3		0–3	0–6	2–12	29–81	3
NR	Pacific Oceania	0–3	3–0		3–3	7–8	59–63	2

== Round-robin ==
=== Indonesia vs. Pacific Oceania ===
Indonesia
3
SAAP Tennis Complex, Hyderabad, India
14 April 2015
Hard

Pacific Oceania
0

			1	2	3
1	(Indonesia) (Pacific Oceania)	Lavinia Tananta; Abigail Tere-Apisah	2; 6	6; 1	6; 3
2	(Indonesia) (Pacific Oceania)	Deria Nur Haliza; Steffi Carruthers	6; 2	6; 0
3	(Indonesia) (Pacific Oceania)	Ayu Fani Damayanti / Lavinia Tananta; Brittany Teei / Abigail Tere-Apisah	6; 0	6; 2

=== Sri Lanka vs. Pacific Oceania ===
Sri Lanka
0
SAAP Tennis Complex, Hyderabad, India
15 April 2015
Hard

Pacific Oceania
3

			1	2	3
1	(Sri Lanka) (Pacific Oceania)	Medhira Samarasinghe; Abigail Tere-Apisah	0; 6	3; 6
2	(Sri Lanka) (Pacific Oceania)	Thisuri Molligoda; Steffi Carruthers	2; 6	7^{7} 6^{5}	1; 6
3	(Sri Lanka) (Pacific Oceania)	Amreetha Muttiah / Medhira Samarasinghe; Steffi Carruthers / Brittany Teei	3; 6	6; 3	3; 6

=== Indonesia vs. Sri Lanka ===
Indonesia
3
SAAP Tennis Complex, Hyderabad, India
16 April 2015
Hard

Sri Lanka
0

			1	2	3
1	(Indonesia) (Sri Lanka)	Lavinia Tananta; Medhira Samarasinghe	6; 1	6; 0
2	(Indonesia) (Sri Lanka)	Deria Nur Haliza; Thisuri Molligoda	6; 0	6; 0
3	(Indonesia) (Sri Lanka)	Ayu Fani Damayanti / Deria Nur Haliza; Amreetha Muttiah / Nethmi Himashi Waduge	6; 2	6; 1

== See also ==
- Fed Cup structure
