= 2016 Fed Cup Asia/Oceania Zone Group I – Pool A =

International tennis competition

Pool A of the 2016 Fed Cup Asia/Oceania Zone Group I was one of two pools in the Asia/Oceania zone of the 2016 Fed Cup. Four teams competed in a round robin competition, with the top team and the bottom team proceeding to their respective sections of the play-offs: the top team played for advancement to the World Group II Play-offs, while the bottom team faced potential relegation to Group II.

== Standings ==
		(Japan) JPN	(Thailand) THA	(Uzbekistan) UZB	(India) IND	RR; W–L	Set; W–L	Game; W–L	Standings
20	Japan		2–1	1–2	2–1	2–1	12–9	101–88	1
24	Thailand	1–2		3–0	3–0	2–1	15–8	125–105	2
29	Uzbekistan	2–1	0–3		0–3	1–2	6–15	71–107	4
38	India	1–2	0–3	3–0		1–2	9–10	88–78	3

== Round-robin ==
=== Japan vs. Uzbekistan ===
Japan
1
Hua Hin Centennial Sports Club, Hua Hin, Thailand
3 February 2016
Hard (outdoor)

Uzbekistan
2

			1	2	3
1	(Japan) (Uzbekistan)	Kurumi Nara; Sabina Sharipova	3; 6	2; 6
2	(Japan) (Uzbekistan)	Nao Hibino; Nigina Abduraimova	7^{8} 6^{6}	4; 6	3; 6
3	(Japan) (Uzbekistan)	Shuko Aoyama / Eri Hozumi; Akgul Amanmuradova / Arina Folts	6; 1	6; 0

=== Thailand vs. India ===
Thailand
3
Hua Hin Centennial Sports Club, Hua Hin, Thailand
3 February 2016
Hard (outdoor)

India
0

			1	2	3
1	(Thailand) (India)	Bunyawi Thamchaiwat; Prerna Bhambri	6; 2	7; 5
2	(Thailand) (India)	Luksika Kumkhum; Ankita Raina	7^{7} 6^{5}	6; 3
3	(Thailand) (India)	Kamonwan Buayam / Peangtarn Plipuech; Prerna Bhambri / Prarthana Thombare	6^{6} 7^{8}	6; 2	6; 4

=== Thailand vs. Uzbekistan ===
Thailand
3
Hua Hin Centennial Sports Club, Hua Hin, Thailand
4 February 2016
Hard (outdoor)

Uzbekistan
0

			1	2	3
1	(Thailand) (Uzbekistan)	Bunyawi Thamchaiwat; Sabina Sharipova	7; 5	3; 6	6; 3
2	(Thailand) (Uzbekistan)	Luksika Kumkhum; Nigina Abduraimova	6; 1	5; 7	6; 3
3	(Thailand) (Uzbekistan)	Kamonwan Buayam / Peangtarn Plipuech; Nigina Abduraimova / Akgul Amanmuradova	7; 5	7; 5

=== Japan vs. India ===
Japan
2
Hua Hin Centennial Sports Club, Hua Hin, Thailand
4 February 2016
Hard (outdoor)

India
1

			1	2	3
1	(Japan) (India)	Eri Hozumi; Prarthana Thombare	6; 2	6; 1
2	(Japan) (India)	Nao Hibino; Ankita Raina	3; 6	1; 6
3	(Japan) (India)	Shuko Aoyama / Eri Hozumi; Sania Mirza / Prarthana Thombare	7; 5	6; 3

=== Thailand vs. Japan ===
Thailand
1
Hua Hin Centennial Sports Club, Hua Hin, Thailand
5 February
Hard (outdoor)

Japan
2

			1	2	3
1	(Thailand) (Japan)	Bunyawi Thamchaiwat; Eri Hozumi	4; 6	7; 5	6; 4
2	(Thailand) (Japan)	Luksika Kumkhum; Nao Hibino	6; 0	5; 7	1; 6
3	(Thailand) (Japan)	Kamonwan Buayam / Peangtarn Plipuech; Shuko Aoyama / Eri Hozumi	5; 7	0; 6

=== Uzbekistan vs. India ===
Uzbekistan
0
Hua Hin Centennial Sports Club, Hua Hin, Thailand
5 February
Hard (outdoor)

India
3

			1	2	3
1	(Uzbekistan) (India)	Sabina Sharipova; Prerna Bhambri	1; 6	1; 6
2	(Uzbekistan) (India)	Nigina Abduraimova; Ankita Raina	1; 6	0; 6
3	(Uzbekistan) (India)	Akgul Amanmuradova / Arina Folts; Sania Mirza / Ankita Raina	2; 6	0; 6
