= 2015 Fed Cup Asia/Oceania Zone Group II – Pool B =

Pool B of the 2015 Fed Cup Asia/Oceania Group II was one of four pools in the Asia/Oceania Group II of the 2015 Fed Cup. Three teams competed in a round robin competition, with the top team and bottom teams proceeding to their respective sections of the play-offs: the top team played for advancement to Group I.

== Standings ==
		TKM	KGZ	IRI	RR; W–L	Set; W–L	Game; W–L	Standings
63	Turkmenistan		3–0	3–0	6–0	12–4	83–53	1
72	Kyrgyzstan	0–3		0–3	0–6	1–12	40–74	3
86	Iran	0–3	3–0		3–3	9–6	67–63	2

== Round-robin ==
=== Kyrgyzstan vs. Iran ===
Kyrgyzstan
0
SAAP Tennis Complex, Hyderabad, India
14 April 2015
Hard

Iran
3

			1	2	3
1	(Kyrgyzstan) (Iran)	Saara Kunakunova; Sadaf Sadeghvaziri	3; 6	1; 6
2	(Kyrgyzstan) (Iran)	Eliza Askarova; Sara Amini	2; 6	4; 6
3	(Kyrgyzstan) (Iran)	Ansari Abildaeva / Saara Kunakunova; Ghazal Pakbaten / Ghazaleh Torkaman	6^{4} 7^{7}	1; 6

=== Turkmenistan vs. Iran ===
Turkmenistan
3
SAAP Tennis Complex, Hyderabad, India
15 April 2015
Hard

Iran
0

			1	2	3
1	(Turkmenistan) (Iran)	Jahana Bayramova; Sadaf Sadeghvaziri	4; 6	6; 1	6; 4
2	(Turkmenistan) (Iran)	Anastasiya Prenko; Sara Amini	6; 3	1; 6	6; 1
3	(Turkmenistan) (Iran)	Jahana Bayramova / Guljan Muhammetkuliyeva; Ghazal Pakbaten / Ghazaleh Torkaman	3; 6	6; 0	6; 3

=== Turkmenistan vs. Kyrgyzstan ===
Turkmenistan
3
SAAP Tennis Complex, Hyderabad, India
16 April 2015
Hard

Kyrgyzstan
0

			1	2	3
1	(Turkmenistan) (Kyrgyzstan)	Jahana Bayramova; Ansari Abildaeva	6; 1	6; 1
2	(Turkmenistan) (Kyrgyzstan)	Anastasiya Prenko; Eliza Askarova	6; 1	6; 4
3	(Turkmenistan) (Kyrgyzstan)	Jahana Bayramova / Guljan Muhammetkuliyeva; Eliza Askarova / Saara Kunakunova	0; 6	6; 4	7^{7} 6^{4}

== See also ==
- Fed Cup structure
