= Khim Iglupas =

Filipino tennis player (born 1998)

- Country (sports): Philippines
- Born: August 23, 1998 (age 27) Manila, Philippines
- Plays: Right-handed (two-handed backhand)
- Career record: 0–1
- Career record: 0–1
- Fed Cup: 6–1
Medal record
Women's tennis
Representing Philippines
Southeast Asian Games
Silver medal – second place	2015 Singapore	Team
- Last updated on: April 16, 2016.

Khim Iglupas (born August 23, 1998 in Manila) is a Filipino tennis player.

In her first year playing for the Philippines at the 2016 Fed Cup, Iglupas had a win–loss record of 6–1. (Note: Khim Iglupas at the Billie Jean King Cup (archived))

== Fed Cup participation ==
=== Singles ===
Edition	Round	Date	Location	Against	Surface	Opponent	W/L	Score
2016 Fed Cup	Asia/Oceania Zone	April 11, 2016	Hua Hin, Thailand	Iran	Hard	Sadaf Sadeghvaziri	W	6–0, 6–0
2016 Fed Cup	Asia/Oceania Zone	April 14, 2016	Hua Hin, Thailand	Hong Kong	Hard	Wu Ho-ching	W	6–4, 7–5
2016 Fed Cup	Asia/Oceania Zone	April 15, 2016	Hua Hin, Thailand	Bahrain	Hard	Nazli Nader Redha	W	6–0, 6–0
2016 Fed Cup	Asia/Oceania Zone	April 16, 2016	Hua Hin, Thailand	Singapore	Hard	Charmaine Shi Yi Seah	W	6–2, 6–4

=== Doubles ===
Edition	Date	Location	Against	Surface	Partner	Opponents	W/L	Score
2016 Fed Cup; Asia/Oceania Zone II	April 11, 2016	Hua Hin, Thailand	Iran	Hard	(Philippines) Anna Clarice Patrimonio	(Iran) Sara Amiri (Iran) Sadaf Sadeghvaziri	W	6–1, 6–4
2016 Fed Cup; Asia/Oceania Zone II	April 13, 2016	Hua Hin, Thailand	Pacific Oceania	Hard	(Philippines) Katharina Lehnert	(Samoa) Steffi Carruthers (Papua New Guinea) Abigail Tere-Apisah	W	6–4, 6–3
2016 Fed Cup; Asia/Oceania Zone II	April 14, 2016	Hua Hin, Thailand	Hong Kong	Hard	(Philippines) Anna Clarice Patrimonio	(Hong Kong) Ng Man-ying (Hong Kong) Sher Chun-wing	L	4–6, 5–7
2017 Fed Cup; Asia/Oceania Zone I	February 8, 2017	Astana, Kazakhstan	China	Hard (i)	(Philippines) Katharina Lehnert	(China) Yang Zhaoxuan (China) Zhang Kailin	L	3–6, 2–6
2017 Fed Cup; Asia/Oceania Zone I	February 9, 2017	Astana, Kazakhstan	(Japan) Japan	Hard (i)	(Philippines) Anna Clarice Patrimonio	(Japan) Shuko Aoyama (Japan) Eri Hozumi	L	2–6, 1–6
2017 Fed Cup; Asia/Oceania Zone I	February 10, 2017	Astana, Kazakhstan	(India) India	Hard (i)	(Philippines) Katharina Lehnert	(India) Ankita Raina (India) Karman Kaur Thandi	L	4–6, 5–7
