= 2015 Fed Cup Asia/Oceania Zone Group I – Pool A =

Pool A of the 2015 Fed Cup Asia/Oceania Group I was one of two pools in the Asia/Oceania Group I of the 2015 Fed Cup. Three teams competed in a round robin competition, with the top team and the bottom two teams proceeding to their respective sections of the play-offs: the top team played for advancement to the World Group II Play-offs, while the bottom team faced potential relegation to Group II.

== Standings ==
		(Japan) JPN	(Uzbekistan) UZB	(Hong Kong) HKG	(South Korea) KOR	RR; W–L	Set; W–L	Game; W–L	Standings	
18	Japan		3–0	3–0	3–0	3–0	9–0	18–2	114–55	1
27	Uzbekistan	0–3		3–0	1–2	1–2	4–5	10–12	97–117	3
37	Hong Kong	0–3	0–3		0–3	0–3	0–9	2–18	74–121	4
46	South Korea	0–3	2–1	3–0		2–1	5–4	12–10	101–93	2

== Round-robin ==
=== Japan vs. South Korea ===
Japan
3
Guangdong Olympic Tennis Centre, Guangzhou, China
4 February 2015
Hard

South Korea
0

			1	2	3
1	(Japan) (South Korea)	Misaki Doi; Han Na-lae	3; 6	6; 1	6; 0
2	(Japan) (South Korea)	Kurumi Nara; Jang Su-jeong	6; 2	6; 3
3	(Japan) (South Korea)	Shuko Aoyama / Eri Hozumi; Han Na-lae / Jang Su-jeong	6; 4	6; 2

=== Uzbekistan vs. Hong Kong ===
Uzbekistan
3
Guangdong Olympic Tennis Centre, Guangzhou, China
4 February 2015
Hard

Hong Kong
0

			1	2	3
1	(Uzbekistan) (Hong Kong)	Akgul Amanmuradova; Wu Ho-ching	7; 5	6; 4
2	(Uzbekistan) (Hong Kong)	Nigina Abduraimova; Zhang Ling	7^{7} 6^{3}	7^{7} 6^{3}
3	(Uzbekistan) (Hong Kong)	Arina Folts / Sabina Sharipova; Maggie Ng / Sher Chun-wing	6; 3	6^{2} 7^{7}	6; 4

=== Japan vs. Hong Kong ===
Japan
3
Guangdong Olympic Tennis Centre, Guangzhou, China
5 February 2015
Hard

Hong Kong
0

			1	2	3
1	(Japan) (Hong Kong)	Eri Hozumi; Wu Ho-ching	6; 1	6; 4
2	(Japan) (Hong Kong)	Misaki Doi; Zhang Ling	6; 1	7^{7} 6^{2}
3	(Japan) (Hong Kong)	Shuko Aoyama / Eri Hozumi; Maggie Ng / Sher Chun-wing	6; 1	6; 1

=== Uzbekistan vs. South Korea ===
Uzbekistan
1
Guangdong Olympic Tennis Centre, Guangzhou, China
5 February 2015
Hard

South Korea
2

			1	2	3
1	(Uzbekistan) (South Korea)	Sabina Sharipova; Han Na-lae	1; 6	7^{7} 6^{2}	2; 6
2	(Uzbekistan) (South Korea)	Nigina Abduraimova; Jang Su-jeong	6; 4	2; 6	6; 4
3	(Uzbekistan) (South Korea)	Nigina Abduraimova / Akgul Amanmuradova; Han Na-lae / Jang Su-jeong	3; 6	2; 6

=== Japan vs. Uzbekistan ===
Japan
3
Guangdong Olympic Tennis Centre, Guangzhou, China
6 February 2015
Hard

Uzbekistan
0

			1	2	3
1	(Japan) (Uzbekistan)	Eri Hozumi; Akgul Amanmuradova	6; 3	6; 3
2	(Japan) (Uzbekistan)	Misaki Doi; Nigina Abduraimova	2; 6	6; 0	6; 3
3	(Japan) (Uzbekistan)	Shuko Aoyama / Eri Hozumi; Arina Folts / Sabina Sharipova	6; 4	6; 4

=== Hong Kong vs. South Korea ===
Hong Kong
0
Guangdong Olympic Tennis Centre, Guangzhou, China
6 February 2015
Hard

South Korea
3

			1	2	3
1	(Hong Kong) (South Korea)	Wu Ho-ching; Han Na-lae	3; 6	5; 7
2	(Hong Kong) (South Korea)	Zhang Ling; Jang Su-jeong	6; 2	4; 6	2; 6
3	(Hong Kong) (South Korea)	Maggie Ng / Sher Chun-wing; Choi Ji-hee / Lee So-ra	3; 6	2; 6
