= Stefanie Tan =

Singaporean tennis player

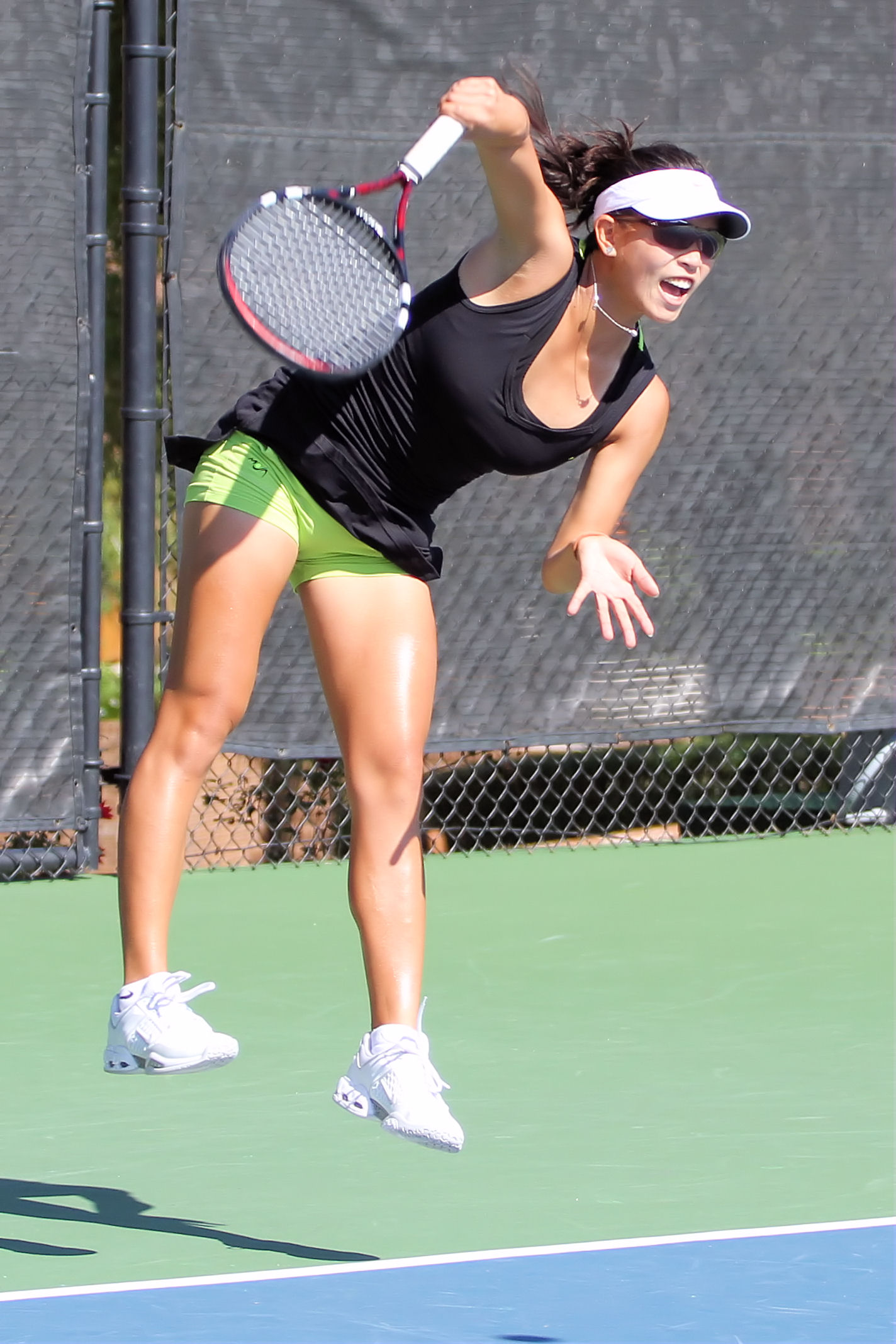
- Tan in 2011
- Full name: Stefanie Li Yun Tan
- Country (sports): Singapore
- Residence: Singapore
- Born: 16 September 1992 (age 33) Singapore
- Plays: Right-handed (two-handed backhand)
- Prize money: $16,727

Singles
- Career record: 47–43
- Career titles: 2 ITF
- Highest ranking: No. 438 (15 May 2017)

Doubles
- Career record: 29–29
- Career titles: 2 ITF
- Highest ranking: No. 507 (8 May 2017)

Team competitions
- Fed Cup: 19–15
Medal record
Women's tennis
Representing Singapore
Southeast Asian Games
Bronze medal – third place	2017 Kuala Lumpur	Singles

Stefanie Li Yun Tan (born 16 September 1992) is a Singaporean former professional tennis player.

Tan has career-high WTA rankings of 438 in singles, achieved on 15 May 2017, and 507 in doubles, reached on 8 May 2017. In her career, she won two singles and two doubles titles on the ITF Women's Circuit.

== Career ==
Playing for Singapore in Fed Cup, Tan has a win–loss record of 19–15.

In 2010, she represented Singapore in the 2010 Summer Youth Olympics.

Tan graduated from Texas Christian University in Fort Worth, Texas in 2015, where she played tennis for the Frogs. Prior to that, she had attended Raffles Institution in Singapore.

On 5 June 2016, Tan won her first professional singles title on the ITF Women's Circuit, at the Baku Cup Futures 2 tournament held at Baku, Azerbaijan. On 10 June, Tan partnered Kazakhstan's Kamila Kerimbayeva and won the doubles title at the Baku Cup Futures 3 tournament.

In the 2017 Southeast Asian Games, Tan claimed the bronze medal in the women's singles tournament, beating Malaysia's Jawairiah Noordin and Vietnam's Tran Thuy Thanh Truc before falling to eventual gold medalist Luksika Kumkhum of Thailand. It was Singapore's first medal for women's tennis in the SEA Games since 34 years ago by Lim Phi Lan who won the women's single silver medal in the 1995 SEA Games and also the first medal for Singapore tennis in the SEA Games in 22 years, last won by the men's tennis team who go a bronze medal. In the women's doubles tournament, she partnered Charmaine Shi Yi Seah but they lost in their opener.

== ITF Circuit finals ==
=== Singles: 2 (2 titles) ===
Legend $10,000 tournaments	Finals by surface Hard (2–0)

Result	W-L	Date	Tournament	Surface	Opponent	Score
Win	1–0	5 June 2016	ITF Baku, Azerbaijan	Hard	(Russia) Valeriya Zeleva	6–1, 6–0
Win	2–0	15 October 2016	ITF Jakarta, Indonesia	Hard	(Indonesia) Jessy Rompies	6–4, 6–4

=== Doubles: 4 (2 titles, 2 runner-ups) ===
Legend $15,000 tournaments $10,000 tournaments	Finals by surface Hard (2–2) Carpet (0–0)

Result	Date	Tournament	Surface	Partner	Opponents	Score
Win	2 August 2014	ITF Fort Worth, United States	Hard	(United States) Hayley Carter	(United States) Catherine Harrison (United States) Mary Weatherholt	6–3, 6–3
Loss	2 June 2016	ITF Baku, Azerbaijan	Hard	(Serbia) Tamara Čurović	(Russia) Kseniia Bekker (Russia) Alina Silich	3–6, 4–6
Win	10 June 2016	ITF Baku, Azerbaijan	Hard	(Kazakhstan) Kamila Kerimbayeva	(Ukraine) Katya Malikova (Ukraine) Angelina Shakhraychuk	6–2, 6–3
Loss	11 August 2017	ITF Nonthaburi, Thailand	Hard	(Australia) Genevieve Lorbergs	(Thailand) Tamachan Momkoonthod (Thailand) Varunya Wongteanchai	3–6, 4–6
