= Katharina Lehnert =

Filipino-German tennis player

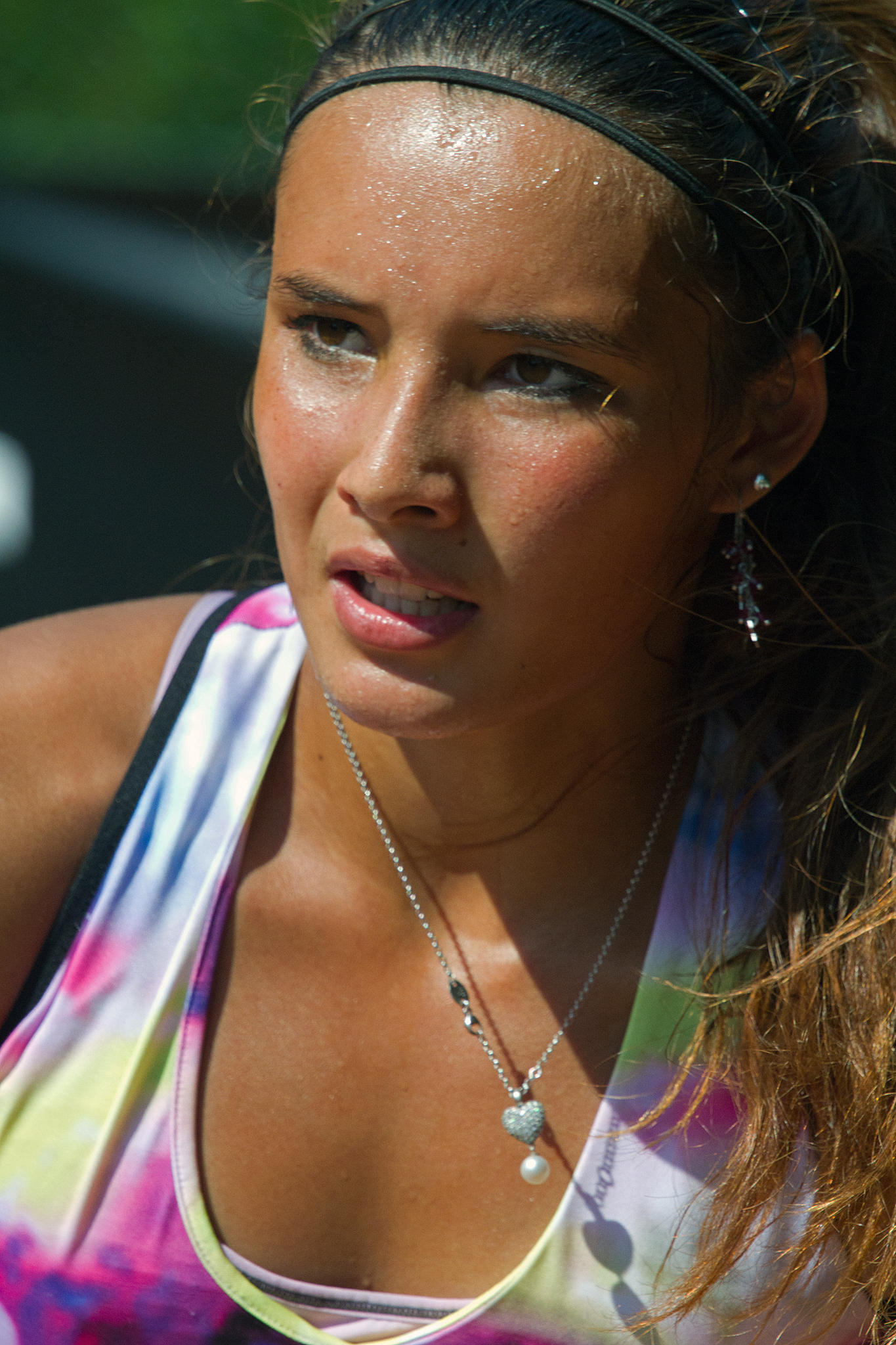
- Full name: Katharina Melissa Lehnert
- Country (sports): Philippines (2013–present); Germany (2008–2013)
- Born: 18 February 1994 (age 32) Braunschweig, Germany
- Plays: Right-handed (two-handed backhand)
- Prize money: $50,615

Singles
- Career record: 199–133
- Career titles: 4 ITF
- Highest ranking: No. 389 (22 April 2013)

Doubles
- Career record: 69–62
- Career titles: 3 ITF
- Highest ranking: No. 451 (24 August 2015)

Team competitions
- Fed Cup: 15–10

Katharina Melissa Lehnert (born 18 February 1994) is a Filipino-German former tennis player. Lehnert has a German father and a Filipino mother; she represented Germany until 2013 when she decided to represent the Philippines.

Lehnert has a career-high WTA singles ranking of No. 389, achieved on 22 April 2013. On 24 August 2015, she peaked at No. 451 of the doubles rankings. In her career, she won four singles titles and three doubles titles on the ITF Circuit.

Playing for Philippines Fed Cup team, Lehnert scored a win–loss record of 15–10.

== ITF Circuit finals ==
=== Singles: 8 (4 titles, 4 runner-ups) ===
Legend $25,000 tournaments $10,000 tournaments	Finals by surface Hard (2–2) Clay (2–2)

Result	No.	Date	Tournament	Surface	Opponent	Score
Loss	1.	12 May 2012	ITF Båstad, Sweden	Clay	(Canada) Eugenie Bouchard	6–7^{(4)}, 0–6
Win	1.	26 August 2012	ITF Braunschweig, Germany	Clay	(Netherlands) Cindy Burger	6–4, 2–6, 7–6^{(6)}
Loss	2.	8 April 2013	ITF Antalya, Turkey	Hard	(Switzerland) Viktorija Golubic	2–6, 3–6
Win	2.	12 January 2015	ITF Sharm El Sheikh, Egypt	Hard	(Netherlands) Eva Wacanno	7–5, 3–6, 6–4
Win	3.	31 August 2015	ITF Engis, Belgium	Clay	(Germany) Vivian Heisen	6–3, 2–6, 6–1
Loss	3.	7 September 2015	ITF Prague, Czech Republic	Clay	(Slovakia) Lenka Juríková	3–6, 4–6
Win	4.	17 October 2015	ITF Sharm El Sheikh, Egypt	Hard	(Russia) Veronika Miroshnichenko	6–4, 6–3
Loss	4.	15 October 2016	ITF Hua Hin, Thailand	Hard	(China) Li Yixuan	6–2, 4–6, 3–6

=== Doubles: 13 (3 titles, 10 runner-ups) ===
Legend $50,000 tournaments $25,000 tournaments $15,000 tournaments $10,000 tournaments	Finals by surface Hard (3–4) Clay (0–5) Carpet (0–1)

Result	No.	Date	Tournament	Surface	Partner	Opponents	Score
Loss	1.	9 November 2009	ITF Manila, Philippines	Hard	(Philippines) Czarina Arevalo	(South Korea) Han Na-lae (South Korea) Yoo Mi	0–6, 3–6
Loss	2.	22 August 2011	ITF Braunschweig, Germany	Clay	(Germany) Sabrina Baumgarten	(Vietnam) Huỳnh Phương Đài Trang (Denmark) Karen Barbat	2–6, 4–6
Loss	3.	18 March 2012	ITF Amiens, France	Clay (i)	(Austria) Katharina Negrin	(Netherlands) Bernice van de Velde (Netherlands) Nicolette van Uitert	6–2, 6–7^{(7)}, [6–10]
Win	1.	1 April 2013	ITF Antalya, Turkey	Hard	(Switzerland) Viktorija Golubic	(Czech Republic) Martina Borecká (Czech Republic) Petra Krejsová	5–7, 6–3, [10–7]
Loss	4.	15 July 2013	ITF Imola, Italy	Carpet	(Italy) Alice Matteucci	(Ukraine) Lyudmyla Kichenok (Latvia) Jeļena Ostapenko	4–6, 6–3, [3–10]
Loss	5.	16 September 2013	ITF Antalya	Hard	(Slovakia) Chantal Škamlová	(Israel) Deniz Khazaniuk (Kyrgyzstan) Ksenia Palkina	7–6^{(5)}, 6–7^{(3)}, [8–10]
Loss	6.	28 February 2014	ITF Bron, France	Hard (i)	(Germany) Anna Klasen	(Ukraine) Alyona Sotnikova (Bulgaria) Isabella Shinikova	7–5, 6–7^{(5)}, [5–10]
Win	2.	5 April 2014	ITF Manama, Bahrain	Hard	(Germany) Michaela Frlicka	(Czech Republic) Linda Dubská (Russia) Evgeniya Svintsova	6–0, 6–2
Win	3.	4 May 2015	ITF Puszczykowo, Poland	Hard	(Russia) Margarita Lazareva	(Brazil) Maria Fernanda Alves (Slovakia) Zuzana Zlochová	6–3, 6–3
Loss	7.	29 June 2015	Bella Cup, Poland	Clay	(Poland) Magdalena Fręch	(Georgia (country)) Ekaterine Gorgodze (Georgia (country)) Sofia Shapatava	4–6, 4–6
Loss	8.	16 August 2015	Ladies Open Hechingen, Germany	Clay	(Germany) Vivian Heisen	(Venezuela) Andrea Gámiz (Ukraine) Anastasiya Vasylyeva	6–4, 6–7^{(4)}, [3–10]
Loss	9.	16 July 2016	ITS Cup, Czech Republic	Clay	(Ukraine) Anastasiya Shoshyna	(Bosnia and Herzegovina) Ema Burgic Bucko (Bosnia and Herzegovina) Jasmina Tinjic	5–7, 3–6
Loss	10.	3 February 2017	ITF Almaty, Kazakhstan	Hard (i)	(Austria) Pia König	(Russia) Olga Doroshina (Russia) Polina Monova	1–6, 2–6

== Fed Cup participation ==
=== Singles (9–6) ===
Edition	Round	Date	Location	Against	Surface	Opponent	W/L	Score
2015 Fed Cup	Asia/Oceania Zone	15 April 2015	Hyderabad, India	Singapore	Hard	(Singapore) Wee Khee-yen	W	6–1, 6–0
2015 Fed Cup	Asia/Oceania Zone	17 April 2015	Hyderabad, India	Indonesia	Hard	(Indonesia) Deria Nur Haliza	W	6–4, 6–2
2015 Fed Cup	Asia/Oceania Zone	18 April 2015	Hyderabad, India	India	Hard	(India) Ankita Raina	W	2–6, 7–5, 7–5
2016 Fed Cup	Asia/Oceania Zone	11 April 2016	Hua Hin, Thailand	Iran	Hard	(Iran) Sara Amiri	W	6–1, 6–4
2016 Fed Cup	Asia/Oceania Zone	13 April 2016	Hua Hin, Thailand	Pacific Oceania	Hard	(Samoa) Steffi Carruthers	W	6–0, 6–2
2016 Fed Cup	Asia/Oceania Zone	14 April 2016	Hua Hin, Thailand	Hong Kong	Hard	(Hong Kong) Zhang Ling	W	6–1, 6–4
2016 Fed Cup	Asia/Oceania Zone	14 April 2016	Hua Hin, Thailand	Singapore	Hard	(Singapore) Stefanie Tan	W	3–6, 6–3, 6–4

=== Doubles (6–4) ===
Edition	Round	Date	Location	Against	Surface	Partner	Opponents	W/L	Score
2015 Fed Cup	Asia/Oceania Zone	15 April 2015	Hyderabad, India	Singapore	Hard	(Philippines) Anna Clarice Patrimonio	(Singapore) Angeline Devi Devanthiran (Singapore) Sarah Pang	W	6–1, 6–2
2015 Fed Cup	Asia/Oceania Zone	17 April 2015	Hyderabad, India	Indonesia	Hard	(Philippines) Anna Clarice Patrimonio	(Indonesia) Ayu Fani Damayanti (Indonesia) Lavinia Tananta	W	6–7^{(12)}, 6–4, 6–2
2015 Fed Cup	Asia/Oceania Zone	18 April 2015	Hyderabad, India	India	Hard	(Philippines) Anna Clarice Patrimonio	(India) Sania Mirza (India) Prarthana Thombare	L	3–6, 3–6
2016 Fed Cup	Asia/Oceania Zone	13 April 2016	Hua Hin, Thailand	Pacific Oceania	Hard	(Philippines) Khim Iglupas	(Samoa) Steffi Carruthers (Papua New Guinea) Abigail Tere-Apisah	W	6–4, 6–3
