= Hua Hin =

City of Hua Hin

Hua Hin หัวหิน
- City Municipality
- City of Hua Hin เทศบาลนครหัวหิน
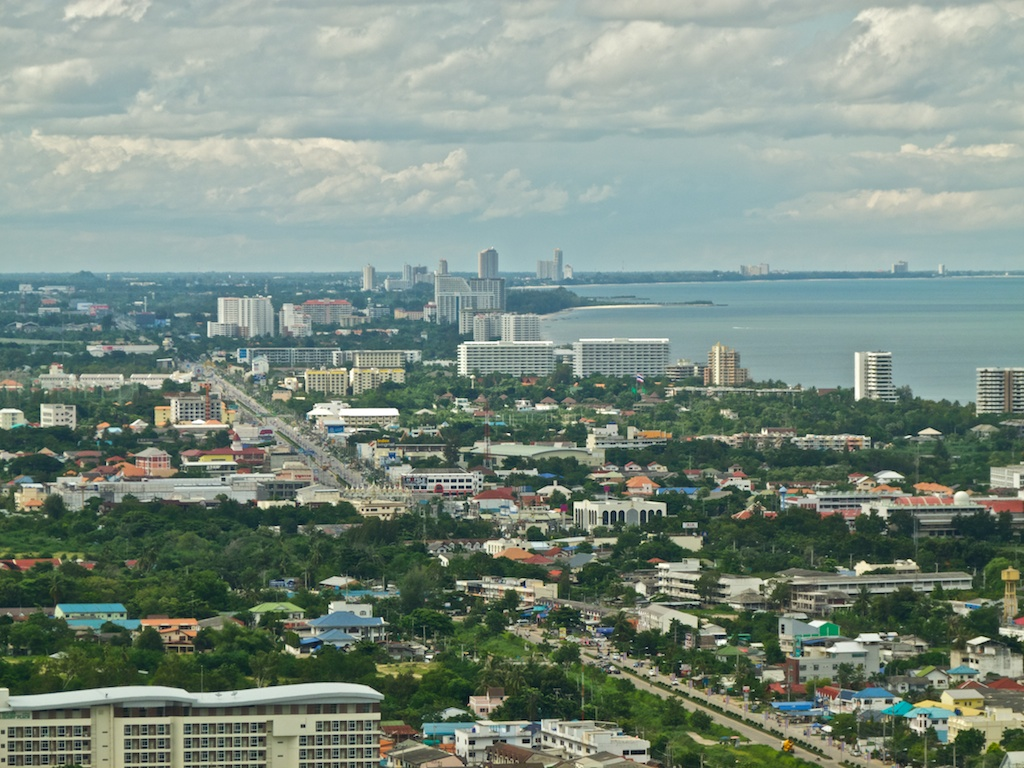
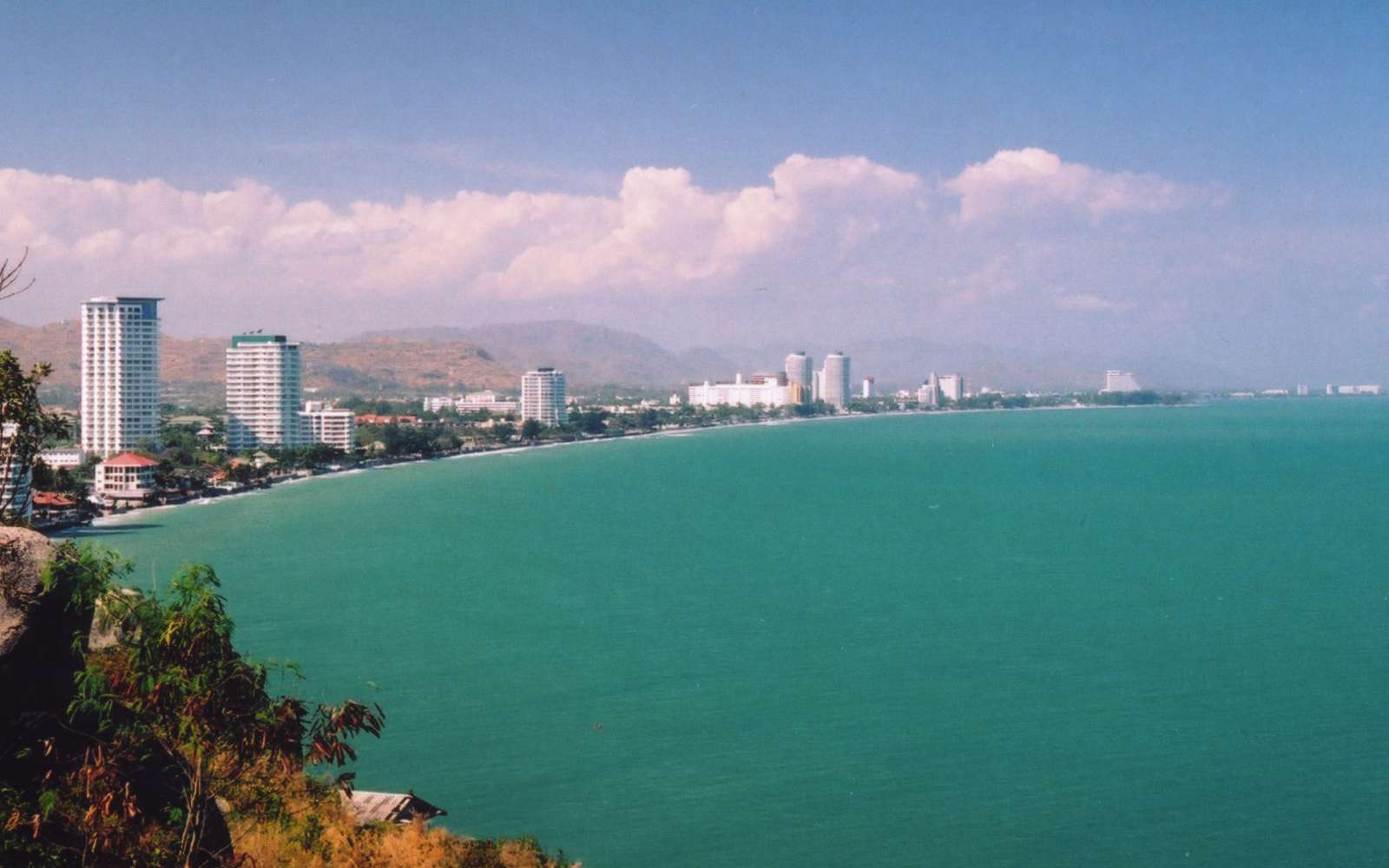
- Aerial views of Hua Hin.

- Seal

- Location in Thailand
- Coordinates: 12°34′N 99°57′E
- Country: Thailand
- Province: Prachuap Khiri Khan
- District: Hua Hin district
- Settled: 1834
- Township municipality: 11 October 1937
- Town municipality: 13 February 2004
- City municipality: 28 March 2025

Government
  - Type: City Municipality
  - Mayor: Nopporn Wutthikul

Area
  - City Municipality: 86.36 km^{2} (33.34 sq mi)
  - Urban: 838.9 km^{2} (323.9 sq mi)
- Elevation: 27 m (89 ft)

Population (December 2020)
  - City Municipality: 65,033
  - Density: 753.0/km^{2} (1,950/sq mi)
  - Urban (2025): 126,355
  - Urban density: 150.6/km^{2} (390.1/sq mi)
- Time zone: UTC+7 (ICT)
- Postcode: 77110
- Calling Code: 077
- Website: www.huahin.go.th

Hua Hin (Thai: หัวหิน, IPA: [hǔə hǐn]) is a coastal city in Western Thailand. It is the largest city of Prachuap Khiri Khan province and the seat of government for Hua Hin district. The city has an area of 86.36km², covering the subdistricts of Hua Hin and Nong Kae with a population of 65,033 residents as of 2020.

== Climate ==
Climate data for Hua Hin (1991–2020, extremes 1954-present)
Month	Jan	Feb	Mar	Apr	May	Jun	Jul	Aug	Sep	Oct	Nov	Dec	Year
Record high °C (°F)	33.4 (92.1)	36.5 (97.7)	36.2 (97.2)	38.3 (100.9)	38.7 (101.7)	37.5 (99.5)	38.7 (101.7)	37.8 (100.0)	38.0 (100.4)	37.3 (99.1)	34.0 (93.2)	34.5 (94.1)	38.7 (101.7)
Mean daily maximum °C (°F)	29.9 (85.8)	31.1 (88.0)	32.3 (90.1)	33.4 (92.1)	33.7 (92.7)	33.4 (92.1)	33.0 (91.4)	32.9 (91.2)	32.3 (90.1)	31.0 (87.8)	30.6 (87.1)	29.8 (85.6)	32.0 (89.5)
Daily mean °C (°F)	26.3 (79.3)	27.3 (81.1)	28.5 (83.3)	29.6 (85.3)	29.5 (85.1)	29.2 (84.6)	28.8 (83.8)	28.6 (83.5)	28.2 (82.8)	27.6 (81.7)	27.4 (81.3)	26.4 (79.5)	28.1 (82.6)
Mean daily minimum °C (°F)	22.8 (73.0)	23.6 (74.5)	24.9 (76.8)	26.0 (78.8)	26.3 (79.3)	26.1 (79.0)	25.7 (78.3)	25.6 (78.1)	25.3 (77.5)	24.8 (76.6)	24.5 (76.1)	23.3 (73.9)	24.9 (76.8)
Record low °C (°F)	13.9 (57.0)	15.4 (59.7)	17.8 (64.0)	21.8 (71.2)	22.4 (72.3)	22.2 (72.0)	22.0 (71.6)	21.9 (71.4)	21.2 (70.2)	19.1 (66.4)	17.2 (63.0)	13.9 (57.0)	13.9 (57.0)
Average precipitation mm (inches)	25.0 (0.98)	13.8 (0.54)	50.5 (1.99)	46.5 (1.83)	95.5 (3.76)	82.4 (3.24)	90.2 (3.55)	67.1 (2.64)	129.8 (5.11)	250.4 (9.86)	72.8 (2.87)	11.9 (0.47)	935.9 (36.85)
Average precipitation days (≥ 1.0 mm)	1.3	0.8	2.2	2.7	8.5	9.2	9.7	9.7	10.6	12.7	4.2	1.3	72.9
Average relative humidity (%)	71.4	73.0	73.9	73.3	74.0	73.6	73.6	73.9	77.1	80.2	73.0	67.6	73.7
Average dew point °C (°F)	20.5 (68.9)	21.8 (71.2)	23.2 (73.8)	24.1 (75.4)	24.2 (75.6)	23.7 (74.7)	23.4 (74.1)	23.3 (73.9)	23.6 (74.5)	23.8 (74.8)	22.0 (71.6)	19.7 (67.5)	22.8 (73.0)
Mean monthly sunshine hours	213.9	225.4	248.0	234.4	196.5	141.7	133.7	133.6	143.4	159.8	190.8	200.2	2,221.4
Source: NOAA
