= Jawairiah Noordin =

Malaysian tennis player

- Full name: Jawairiah binti Noordin
- Country (sports): Malaysia
- Born: 8 October 1990 (age 35) Penang, Malaysia
- Plays: Right (two-handed backhand)
- Prize money: $14,183

Singles
- Career record: 38–39
- Career titles: 0
- Highest ranking: No. 931 (16 November 2009)

Doubles
- Career record: 21–26
- Career titles: 2 ITF
- Highest ranking: No. 718 (6 March 2017)

Team competitions
- Fed Cup: 17–14
Medal record
Women's Tennis
Representing Malaysia
Islamic Solidarity Games
Bronze medal – third place	2017 Baku	Doubles
Southeast Asian Games
Bronze medal – third place	2007 Nakhon Ratchasima	Team
Bronze medal – third place	2009 Vientiane	Team
Bronze medal – third place	2015 Singapore	Team
Bronze medal – third place	2017 Kuala Lumpur	Doubles
Bronze medal – third place	2021 Vietnam	Doubles

Jawairiah binti Noordin (born 8 October 1990) is an inactive Malaysian tennis player.

On 16 November 2009, she reached her best singles ranking of world No. 931.

Jawairiah made her WTA Tour debut at the 2010 Malaysian Open, having received a wildcard with Huỳnh Phương Đài Trang into the doubles tournament, but they lost to Vitalia Diatchenko and Chanelle Scheepers in the first round.

She also received a wildcard into the main draw of the 2015 Malaysian Open, where she lost to Yulia Putintseva in the first round.

Playing for Malaysia Fed Cup team, Jawairiah has a win–loss record of 17-14.

She has won two bronze medals for Malaysia at the Southeast Asian Games, in 2007 and 2009 in the women's team event.

== ITF finals ==
=== Singles (0–1) ===
Legend $15,000 tournaments	Finals by surface Hard (0–1)

Result	No.	Date	Tournament	Surface	Opponent	Score
Loss	1.	6 October 2019	W15 Sharm El Sheikh, Egypt	Hard	(United States) Dasha Ivanova	7–6^{(11)}, 3–6, 4–6

=== Doubles (2–1) ===
Legend $10,000 tournaments	Finals by surface Hard (2–1)

Result	No.	Date	Tournament	Surface	Partner	Opponents	Score
Loss	1.	26 September 2015	W10 Solo, Indonesia	Hard	(Indonesia) Vita Taher	(Indonesia) Beatrice Gumulya (Indonesia) Jessy Rompies	3–6, 5–7
Win	1.	6 August 2016	W10 Sharm El Sheikh, Egypt	Hard	(Malaysia) Theiviya Selvarajoo	(Russia) Ksenia Laskutova (Ukraine) Kateryna Sliusar	7–5, 4–6, [12–10]
Win	2.	25 November 2016	W10 Hua Hin, Thailand	Hard	(Indonesia) Jessy Rompies	(Thailand) Kamonwan Buayam (Hong Kong) Zhang Ling	6–4, 6–3

== Fed Cup participation ==
=== Singles ===
Edition	Round	Date	Location	Against	Surface	Opponent	W/L	Score
2010 Fed Cup	Asia/Oceania Zone	3 February 2010	Kuala Lumpur, Malaysia	Singapore	Hard	(Singapore) Stefanie Tan	L	2–6, 3–6
2010 Fed Cup	Asia/Oceania Zone	5 February 2010	Kuala Lumpur, Malaysia	India	Hard	(India) Sania Mirza	L	1–6, 0–6
2010 Fed Cup	Asia/Oceania Zone	6 February 2010	Kuala Lumpur, Malaysia	Hong Kong	Hard	(Hong Kong) Zhang Ling	L	1–6, 1–6
2015 Fed Cup	Asia/Oceania Zone	14 April 2015	Hyderabad, India	Pakistan	Hard (i)	(Pakistan) Ushna Suhail	W	6–2, 6–0
2015 Fed Cup	Asia/Oceania Zone	16 April 2015	Hyderabad, India	India	Hard (i)	(India) Ankita Raina	L	1–6, 6–3, 4–6
2016 Fed Cup	Asia/Oceania Zone	11 April 2016	Hua Hin, Thailand	Kyrgyzstan	Hard	(Kyrgyzstan) Nelli Buyuklianova	W	6–0, 6–1
2016 Fed Cup	Asia/Oceania Zone	12 April 2016	Hua Hin, Thailand	Pakistan	Hard	(Pakistan) Ushna Suhail	W	6–1, 6–2
2016 Fed Cup	Asia/Oceania Zone	13 April 2016	Hua Hin, Thailand	Sri Lanka	Hard	(Sri Lanka) Nethmi Himashi Waduge	W	6–3, 6–0
2016 Fed Cup	Asia/Oceania Zone	14 April 2016	Hua Hin, Thailand	Singapore	Hard	(Singapore) Stefanie Tan	L	1–6, 3–6
2016 Fed Cup	Asia/Oceania Zone	15 April 2016	Hua Hin, Thailand	Indonesia	Hard	(Indonesia) Beatrice Gumulya	W	5–7, 6–2, 6–4
2016 Fed Cup	Asia/Oceania Zone	16 April 2016	Hua Hin, Thailand	Hong Kong	Hard	(Hong Kong) Wu Ho-ching	W	7–5, 6–3

=== Doubles ===
Edition	Round	Date	Location	Against	Surface	Partner	Opponents	W/L	Score
2010 Fed Cup	Asia/Oceania Zone	3 February 2010	Kuala Lumpur, Malaysia	Singapore	Hard	Khoo Chin-bee	(Singapore) Clare Fong (Singapore) Stefanie Tan	W	6–4, 6–2
2010 Fed Cup	Asia/Oceania Zone	5 February 2010	Kuala Lumpur, Malaysia	India	Hard	Khoo Chin-bee	(India) Sanaa Bhambri (India) Poojashree Venkatesha	L	6–7^{(4–7)}, 2–6
2010 Fed Cup	Asia/Oceania Zone	6 February 2010	Kuala Lumpur, Malaysia	Hong Kong	Hard	Khoo Chin-bee	(Hong Kong) Wu Ho-ching (Hong Kong) Yang Zi-jun	W	6–1, 6–3
2015 Fed Cup	Asia/Oceania Zone	14 April 2015	Hyderabad, India	Pakistan	Hard (i)	Yus Syazlin Yusri	(Pakistan) Sara Mansoor (Pakistan) Ushna Suhail	W	6–0, 6–2
2016 Fed Cup	Asia/Oceania Zone	11 April 2016	Hua Hin, Thailand	Kyrgyzstan	Hard	Nurin Nabilah Roslan	(Kyrgyzstan) Nelli Buyuklianova (Kyrgyzstan) Alina Lazareva	W	6–2, 6–1
2016 Fed Cup	Asia/Oceania Zone	12 April 2016	Hua Hin, Thailand	Pakistan	Hard	Theiviya Selvarajoo	(Pakistan) Sarah Mahboob Khan (Pakistan) Ushna Suhail	W	6–3, 6–0
2016 Fed Cup	Asia/Oceania Zone	14 April 2016	Hua Hin, Thailand	Singapore	Hard	Theiviya Selvarajoo	(Singapore) Charmaine Shi Yi Seah (Singapore) Stefanie Tan	L	6–3, 6–7^{(3–7)}, 5–7
2016 Fed Cup	Asia/Oceania Zone	15 April 2016	Hua Hin, Thailand	Indonesia	Hard	Theiviya Selvarajoo	(Indonesia) Beatrice Gumulya (Indonesia) Jessy Rompies	W	6–4, 7–6^{(7–5)}
2016 Fed Cup	Asia/Oceania Zone	16 April 2016	Hua Hin, Thailand	Hong Kong	Hard	Theiviya Selvarajoo	(Hong Kong) Ng Man-ying (Hong Kong) Sher Chun-wing	L	3–6, 6–7^{(4–7)}
