= 2016 Fed Cup Asia/Oceania Zone =

Subsection of tennis competition

The Asia/Oceania Zone was one of three zones of regional competition in the 2016 Fed Cup.

== Group I ==
- Venue: Hua Hin Centennial Sports Club, Hua Hin, Thailand (outdoor hard).
- Date: 3–6 February.

The eight teams were divided into two pools of four teams. The two pool winners took part in a play-off to determine the nation advancing to the World Group II play-offs. The nations finishing last in their pools took part in relegation play-offs, with the losing nation was relegated to Group II for 2017.

=== Pools ===
	Pool A	JPN	THA	IND	UZB
1	Japan (2–1)		2–1	2–1	1–2
2	Thailand (2–1)	1–2		3–0	3–0
3	India (1–2)	1–2	0–3		3–0
4	Uzbekistan (1–2)	2–1	0–3	0–3	

	Pool B	TPE	CHN	KAZ	KOR
1	Chinese Taipei (3–0)		2–1	2–1	2–1
2	China (2–1)	1–2		3–0	2–1
3	Kazakhstan (1–2)	1–2	0–3		3–0
4	South Korea (0–3)	1–2	1–2	0–3	

=== Play-offs ===
Placing	A Team	Score	B Team
Promotional	Japan	1–2	Chinese Taipei
3rd–4th	Thailand	1–2	China
5th–6th	India	3–0	Kazakhstan
Relegation	Uzbekistan	0–3	South Korea

=== Final placements ===
Placing	Team
Promoted/First	Chinese Taipei
Second	Japan
Third	China
Fourth	Thailand
Fifth	India
Sixth	Kazakhstan
Seventh	South Korea
Relegated/Eighth	Uzbekistan

- Chinese Taipei was promoted to the 2016 Fed Cup World Group II Play-offs.
- Uzbekistan was relegated to Asia/Oceania Zone Group II in 2017.

== Group II ==
- Venue: Centennial Sports Club, Hua Hin, Thailand (outdoor hard)
- Dates: 11–16 April

The eleven teams were divided into two pools, one of five teams and one of six teams. The two nations placing first in their pools took part in play-offs to determine the nation promoted to Group I in 2017.

=== Pools ===
	Pool A	PHI	HKG	POC	IRI	BHR
1	Philippines (4–0)		2–1	2–1	3–0	2–0
2	Hong Kong (3–1)	1–2		2–1	2–0	3–0
3	Pacific Oceania (2–2)	1–2	1–2		3–0	3–0
4	Iran (1–3)	0–3	0–2	0–3		3–0
5	Bahrain (0–4)	0–2	0–3	0–3	0–3	

	Pool B	SIN	MAS	INA	SRI	PAK	KGZ
1	Singapore (4–1)		2–1	2–1	2–1	2–1	1–2
2	Malaysia (4–1)	1–2		2–1	3–0	3–0	3–0
3	Indonesia (3–2)	1–2	1–2		3–0	3–0	3–0
4	Sri Lanka (2–3)	1–2	0–3	0–3		2–0	3–0
5	Pakistan (1–4)	1–2	0–3	0–3	0–2		3–0
6	Kyrgyzstan (1–4)	2–1	0–3	0–3	0–3	0–3	

=== Play-offs ===
Placing	A Team	Score	B Team
Promotional	Philippines	2–0	Singapore
3rd–4th	Hong Kong	2–1	Malaysia
5th–6th	Pacific Oceania	0–2	Indonesia
7th–8th	Iran	1–2	Sri Lanka
9th–10th	Bahrain	0–3	Pakistan
11th	—		Kyrgyzstan

=== Final placements ===
Placing	Teams
Promoted/First	Philippines
Second	Singapore
Third	Hong Kong
Fourth	Malaysia
Fifth	Indonesia
Six	Pacific Oceania
Seventh	Sri Lanka
Eighth	Iran
Ninth	Pakistan
Tenth	Bahrain
Eleventh	Kyrgyzstan

- Philippines were promoted to Asia/Oceania Group I in 2017.
