= 2018 Fed Cup Asia/Oceania Zone Group II – play-offs =

Subsection of tennis competition

The play-offs of the 2018 Fed Cup Asia/Oceania Zone Group II were the final stages of the Group II Zonal Competition involving teams from Asia and Oceania. Using the positions determined in their pools, the fourteen teams faced off to determine their placing in the 2018 Fed Cup Asia/Oceania Zone Group II. The top team advanced to Asia/Oceania Group I in 2019.

== Pool results ==
Placing	Pool A	Pool B	Pool C	Pool D
1	Uzbekistan	Singapore	Pacific Oceania	Indonesia
2	New Zealand	Philippines	Oman	Pakistan
3	Lebanon	Kyrgyzstan	Malaysia	Sri Lanka
4	—		Iran	Bahrain

== Promotional play-offs ==
The first placed teams of the pools were drawn in head-to-head rounds. The winners advanced to the Asia/Oceania Group I in 2019.

=== Uzbekistan vs. Indonesia ===
Uzbekistan
0
Bahrain Polytechnic, Isa Town, Bahrain
10 February
Hard

Indonesia
3

			1	2	3
1	(Uzbekistan) (Indonesia)	Akgul Amanmuradova; Aldila Sutjiadi	2; 6	2; 6
2	(Uzbekistan) (Indonesia)	Sabina Sharipova; Beatrice Gumulya	6; 4	5; 7	5; 7
3	(Uzbekistan) (Indonesia)	Nigina Abduraimova / Yasmina Karimjanova; Deria Nur Haliza / Jessy Rompies	6^{5} 7^{7}	1; 6

=== Singapore vs. Pacific Oceania ===
Singapore
1
Bahrain Polytechnic, Isa Town, Bahrain
10 February
Hard

Pacific Oceania
2

			1	2	3
1	(Singapore) (Pacific Oceania)	Charmaine Shi Yi Seah; Steffi Carruthers	6; 4	6; 4
2	(Singapore) (Pacific Oceania)	Stefanie Tan; Abigail Tere-Apisah	6; 2	2; 6	4; 6
3	(Singapore) (Pacific Oceania)	Charmaine Shi Yi Seah / Stefanie Tan; Steffi Carruthers / Abigail Tere-Apisah	1; 6	1; 6

== 5th to 8th play-offs ==
The second placed teams of the pools were drawn in head-to-head rounds to find the fifth to eighth placed teams.

=== New Zealand vs. Pakistan ===
New Zealand
3
Bahrain Polytechnic, Isa Town, Bahrain
9 February
Hard

Pakistan
0

			1	2	3
1	(New Zealand) (Pakistan)	Jade Lewis; Mahin Qureshi	6; 1	6; 0
2	(New Zealand) (Pakistan)	Erin Routliffe; Ushna Suhail	6; 3	6; 1
3	(New Zealand) (Pakistan)	Emily Fanning / Katherine Westbury; Sarah Mahboob Khan / Ushna Suhail	6; 3	6; 1

=== Philippines vs. Oman ===
Philippines
3
Bahrain Polytechnic, Isa Town, Bahrain
9 February
Hard

Oman
0

			1	2	3
1	(Philippines) (Oman)	Marian Capadocia; Aisha Al Suleimani	6; 1	6; 0
2	(Philippines) (Oman)	Khim Iglupas; Maryam Al Balushi	6; 2	6; 1
3	(Philippines) (Oman)	Katharina Lehnert / Anna Clarice Patrimonio; Maryam Al Balushi / Aisha Al Suleimani	6; 1	6; 0

== 9th to 12th play-offs ==
The third placed teams of the pools were drawn in head-to-head rounds to find the ninth to twelfth placed teams.

=== Lebanon vs. Sri Lanka ===
Lebanon
0
Bahrain Polytechnic, Isa Town, Bahrain
9 February
Hard

Sri Lanka
3

			1	2	3
1	(Lebanon) (Sri Lanka)	Yara Fayssal; Nethmi Himashi Waduge	3; 6	2; 6
2	(Lebanon) (Sri Lanka)	Hoda Habib; Anika Seneviratne	0; 6	2; 6
3	(Lebanon) (Sri Lanka)	Yara Fayssal / Sara Nassif; Janali Manamperi / Anika Seneviratne	2; 6	4; 6

=== Kyrgyzstan vs. Malaysia ===
Kyrgyzstan
2
Bahrain Polytechnic, Isa Town, Bahrain
9 February
Hard

Malaysia
1

			1	2	3
1	(Kyrgyzstan) (Malaysia)	Saara Kunakunova; Theiviya Selvarajoo	6^{3} 7^{7}	6; 3	6; 3
2	(Kyrgyzstan) (Malaysia)	Ksenia Palkina; Suhana Sofia Mohd Adam Das	6; 4	6; 4
3	(Kyrgyzstan) (Malaysia)	Kanykey Koichumanova / Saara Kunakunova; Jawairiah Noordin / Suhana Sofia Mohd Adam Das	4; 6	2; 6

== Final placements ==
Placing	Teams	
Promoted/First	Indonesia	Pacific Oceania
Third	Uzbekistan	Singapore
Fifth	New Zealand	Philippines
Seventh	Pakistan	Oman
Ninth	Sri Lanka	Kyrgyzstan
Eleventh	Lebanon	Malaysia
Thirteenth	Bahrain	Iran

- Indonesia and Pacific Oceania were promoted to Asia/Oceania Zone Group I in 2019.

== See also ==
- Fed Cup structure
