= 1993 Federation Cup Asia/Oceania Zone =

The Asia/Oceania Zone was one of three zones of regional Federation Cup qualifying competition in 1993. All ties were played at the National Tennis Centre in Colombo, Sri Lanka on clay courts.

The nine teams were divided into three pools of three to compete in round-robin matches. After each of the ties had been played, the teams that finished first and second in each of the respective pools would then move on to the play-off stage of the competition. The team that won the knockout stage would go on to advance to the World Group.

== Pool Stage ==
Date: 3–4 May

	Pool A	INA	THA	PHI
1	Indonesia (2–0)		2–0	3–0
2	Thailand (1–1)	0–2		2–1
3	Philippines (0–2)	0–3	1–2	

	Pool B	CHN	TPE	SIN
1	China (2–0)		2–1	2–0
2	Chinese Taipei (1–1)	1–2		3–0
3	Singapore (0–2)	0–2	0–3	

	Pool C	NZL	SRI	LIB
1	New Zealand (2–0)		2–1	2–0
2	Sri Lanka (1–1)	1–2		3–0
3	Lebanon (0–2)	0–2	0–3	

== Play-offs ==
Date: 5 May

Winning team	Score	Losing team
Indonesia	3–0	Singapore
China	3–0	Sri Lanka
New Zealand	2–1	Thailand

- China, Indonesia and New Zealand advanced to World Group.

== See also ==
- Fed Cup structure
