= 2018 Fed Cup Asia/Oceania Zone =

Subsection of tennis competition

The Asia/Oceania Zone was one of three zones of regional competition in the 2018 Fed Cup.

== Group I ==
- Venue: R.K. Khanna Tennis Complex, New Delhi, India (hard)
- Date: 7–10 February

The eight teams were divided into two pools of four teams. The two pool winners took part in a play-off to determine the nation advancing to the World Group II play-offs. The four nations finishing last and second last in their pools took part in relegation play-offs, with the two losing nations being relegated to Group II for 2019.

=== Seeding ===
| Pot | Nation | Rank^{1} | Seed |
|---|---|---|---|
| 1 | Kazakhstan | 21 | 1 |
| 1 | Chinese Taipei | 22 | 2 |
| 2 | Japan | 23 | 3 |
| 2 | China | 25 | 4 |
| 3 | Thailand | 29 | 5 |
| 3 | India | 32 | 6 |
| 4 | Hong Kong | 34 | 7 |
| 4 | South Korea | 35 | 8 |

- ^{1}Fed Cup Rankings as of 13 November 2017

=== Pools ===
| | Pool A | KAZ | CHN | IND | HKG |
| 1 | Kazakhstan (3–0) | | 3–0 | 2–1 | 3–0 |
| 2 | China (2–1) | 0–3 | | 2–1 | 2–1 |
| 3 | India (1–2) | 1–2 | 1–2 | | 3–0 |
| 4 | Hong Kong (0–3) | 0–3 | 1–2 | 0–3 | |

| | Pool B | JPN | KOR | THA | TPE |
| 1 | Japan (3–0) | | 3–0 | 3–0 | 3–0 |
| 2 | South Korea (2–1) | 0–3 | | 2–1 | 3–0 |
| 3 | Thailand (1–2) | 0–3 | 1–2 | | 2–1 |
| 4 | Chinese Taipei (0–3) | 0–3 | 0–3 | 1–2 | |

=== Play-offs ===
| Placing | A Team | Score | B Team |
|---|---|---|---|
| Promotional | Kazakhstan | 1–2 | Japan |
| 3rd–4th | China | 2–0 | South Korea |
| Relegation | India | 2–0 | Chinese Taipei |
| Relegation | Hong Kong | 1–2 | Thailand |

=== Final placements ===
| Placing | Teams | |
| Promoted/First | Japan | |
| Second | Kazakhstan | |
| Third | China | |
| Fourth | South Korea | |
| Fifth | India | Thailand |
| Relegated/Seventh | Chinese Taipei | Hong Kong |

- Japan was promoted to the 2018 Fed Cup World Group II Play-offs.
- Chinese Taipei and Hong Kong were relegated to Asia/Oceania Zone Group II in 2019.

== Group II ==
- Venue: Bahrain Polytechnic, Isa Town, Bahrain (hard)
- Date: 6–10 February

The fourteen teams were divided into two pools of four teams and two pools of three teams. The four pool winners took part in a play-off to determine the nations advancing to the World Group II play-offs.

=== Seeding ===
| Pot | Nation | Rank^{1} | Seed |
|---|---|---|---|
| 1 | Uzbekistan | 33 | 1 |
| 1 | Philippines | 48 | 2 |
| 1 | Malaysia | 55 | 3 |
| 1 | Indonesia | 56 | 4 |
| 2 | Singapore | 58 | 5 |
| 2 | Pacific Oceania | 61 | 6 |
| 2 | Sri Lanka | 66 | 7 |
| 2 | New Zealand | 71 | 8 |
| 3 | Iran | 80 | 9 |
| 3 | Pakistan | 83 | 10 |
| 3 | Kyrgyzstan | 89 | 11 |
| 3 | Bahrain | 101 | 12 |
| 3 | Lebanon | NR | 13 |
| 3 | Oman | NR | 14 |

- ^{1}Fed Cup Rankings as of 13 November 2017

=== Pools ===
| | Pool A | UZB | NZL | LBN |
| 1 | Uzbekistan (2–0) | | 3–0 | 3–0 |
| 2 | New Zealand (1–1) | 0–3 | | 3–0 |
| 3 | Lebanon (0–2) | 0–3 | 0–3 | |

| | Pool B | SGP | PHI | KGZ |
| 1 | Singapore (2–0) | | 2–1 | 2–1 |
| 2 | Philippines (1–1) | 1–2 | | 2–1 |
| 3 | Kyrgyzstan (0–2) | 1–2 | 1–2 | |

| | Pool C | POC | OMA | MAS | IRI |
| 1 | Pacific Oceania (3–0) | | 3–0 | 3–0 | 3–0 |
| 2 | Oman (2–1) | 0–3 | | 2–1 | 2–1 |
| 3 | Malaysia (1–2) | 0–3 | 1–2 | | 3–0 |
| 4 | Iran (0–3) | 0–3 | 1–2 | 0–3 | |

| | Pool D | INA | PAK | SRI | BRN |
| 1 | Indonesia (3–0) | | 3–0 | 3–0 | 3–0 |
| 2 | Pakistan (2–1) | 0–3 | | 2–1 | 3–0 |
| 3 | Sri Lanka (1–2) | 0–3 | 1–2 | | 3–0 |
| 4 | Bahrain (0–3) | 0–3 | 0–3 | 0–3 | |

=== Play-offs ===
| Placing | A Team | Score | D Team |
|---|---|---|---|
| Promotional | Uzbekistan | 0–3 | Indonesia |
| 5th–8th | New Zealand | 3–0 | Pakistan |
| 9th–12th | Lebanon | 0–3 | Sri Lanka |
| 13th | — | | Bahrain |

| Placing | B Team | Score | C Team |
|---|---|---|---|
| Promotional | Singapore | 1–2 | Pacific Oceania |
| 5th–8th | Philippines | 3–0 | Oman |
| 9th–12th | Kyrgyzstan | 2–1 | Malaysia |
| 13th | — | | Iran |

=== Final placements ===
| Placing | Teams | |
| Promoted/First | Indonesia | Pacific Oceania |
| Third | Uzbekistan | Singapore |
| Fifth | New Zealand | Philippines |
| Seventh | Pakistan | Oman |
| Ninth | Sri Lanka | Kyrgyzstan |
| Eleventh | Lebanon | Malaysia |
| Thirteenth | Bahrain | Iran |

- Indonesia and Pacific Oceania were promoted to Asia/Oceania Zone Group I in 2019.
