= Katherine Westbury =

Thai-New Zealand tennis player

Katherine Westbury แคทเธอรีน เวสบุรี
- Country (sports): New Zealand (2006–2012; 2014–current); Thailand (2012–2014)
- Residence: Burwood East, Victoria, Australia
- Born: 14 March 1993 (age 33) Hamilton, New Zealand
- Height: 1.77 m (5 ft 10 in)
- Plays: Right (two-handed both sides)
- Prize money: $21,293

Singles
- Career record: 98–80
- Career titles: 0
- Highest ranking: No. 576 (3 October 2011)

Doubles
- Career record: 8–9
- Career titles: 1 ITF
- Highest ranking: No. 696 (20 March 2023)

Team competitions
- Fed Cup: 2–2 (singles 1–1)
- Last updated on: 29 June 2024.

Katherine "Kat" Westbury (Thai: แคทเธอรีน เวสบุรี; born 14 March 1993) is an inactive Thai-New Zealand tennis player.

She reached her best singles ranking of world No. 576 on 3 October 2011, and made her WTA Tour debut at the 2015 Auckland Open.

Westbury has two brothers. Aged three she moved to Bangkok, Thailand with her parents where she attended pre-school and primary school. Westbury began playing tennis at the age of 6 at the British Club in Bangkok. Her family returned to New Zealand two years later, settling in Christchurch, where she attended Burnside Primary School and Cobham Intermediate School, while also playing on the Canterbury Tennis Regional Squad under coach Glenn Wilson. In 2005 the family moved to Sydney, before further re-locating to Burwood East, Victoria, where she still resides.

== Tennis career ==
=== 2015 ===
Having played doubles in just one previous ITF tournament, and that being six years earlier, Westbury was awarded a wildcard into the Auckland Open with Rosie Cheng; they were beaten by Petra Martić and Anna Tatishvili in the first round.

=== 2018 ===
Westbury played her first Fed Cup matches for New Zealand in Bahrain in February 2018. She won her only singles rubber, and won one and lost one doubles rubber.

=== 2020 ===
Westbury resumed her professional career in 2020, starting at the reintroduced ITF tournament in Hamilton. She reached the semifinals of both singles and doubles, and followed that by reaching the second round of singles in Mildura before international tennis was suspended due to the COVID-19 pandemic. She resumed after the break with a series of tournaments in Monastir, Tunisia.

=== 2022 ===
Westbury played one Billie Jean King Cup (formerly Fed Cup) match for New Zealand in April but, more importantly, won her first professional title when partnering Destanee Aiava to win an ITF doubles title in Traralgon, Australia, at the end of November.

== ITF Circuit finals ==
=== Singles: 2 (runner-ups) ===
W10 tournaments (0–2)

Result	W–L	Date	Tournament	Surface	Opponent	Score
Loss	0–1	Sep 2010	W10 Jakarta, Indonesia	Hard	(Indonesia) Sandy Gumulya	3–6, 0–6
Loss	0–2	Jul 2013	W10 Bangkok, Thailand	Hard	(China) Lu Jiajing	7–5, 3–6, 3–6

=== Doubles: 1 (title) ===
Legend W25 tournaments (1–0)	Finals by surface Hard (1–0)

Result	W–L	Date	Tournament	Surface	Partner	Opponents	Score
Win	1–0	Nov 2022	W25 Traralgon, Australia	Hard	(Australia) Destanee Aiava	(India) Ankita Raina (Indonesia) Priska Madelyn Nugroho	6–1, 4–6, [10–5]

== Fed Cup participation ==
=== Singles ===
Edition	Stage	Date	Location	Against	Surface	Opponent	W/L	Score
2018 Fed Cup; Asia/Oceania Zone Group II	R/R	7 February 2018	Bahrain	Lebanon	Hard	(Lebanon) Nancy Karaky	W	6–0, 6–0
2022 Billie Jean King Cup; Asia/Oceania Zone Group I	R/R	16 April 2022	Antalya, Turkey	Indonesia	Clay	(Indonesia) Aldila Sutjiadi	L	1–6, 1–6

=== Doubles ===
Edition	Stage	Date	Location	Against	Surface	Partner	Opponents	W/L	Score
2018 Fed Cup; Asia/Oceania Zone Group II	R/R	8 February 2018	Bahrain	Uzbekistan	Hard	Emily Fanning	(Uzbekistan) Akgul Amanmuradova (Uzbekistan) Yasmina Karimjanova	L	5–7, 1–6
2018 Fed Cup; Asia/Oceania Zone Group II	P/O	9 February 2018	Bahrain	Pakistan	Hard	Emily Fanning	(Pakistan) Sarah Mahboob Khan (Pakistan) Mahin Qureshi	W	6–3, 6–1
