= Erin Routliffe =

Canadian-New Zealand tennis player (born 1995)

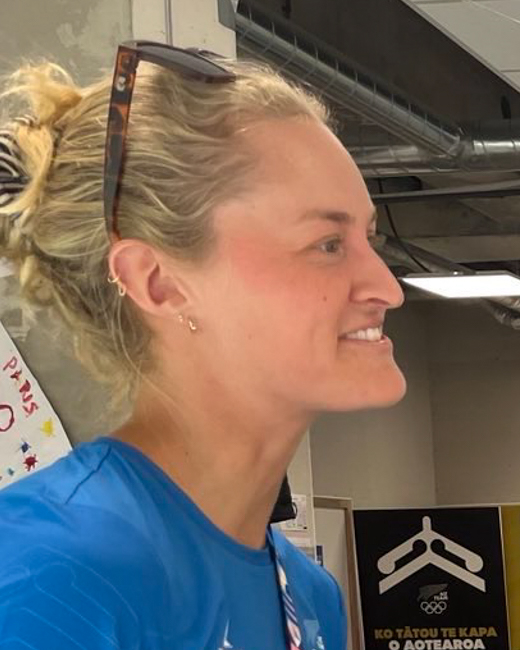
- Routliffe in 2024
- Country (sports): Canada (2009–May 2017); New Zealand (June 2017–present)
- Residence: Caledon, Ontario, Canada
- Born: 11 April 1995 (age 31) Auckland, New Zealand
- Height: 1.88 m (6 ft 2 in)
- Turned pro: 2017
- Plays: Right-handed (two-handed backhand)
- College: University of Alabama
- Prize money: US$ 3,710,060

Singles
- Career record: 85–90
- Career titles: 0
- Highest ranking: No. 582 (12 June 2023)

Doubles
- Career record: 322–209
- Career titles: 14
- Highest ranking: No. 1 (15 July 2024)
- Current ranking: No. 11 (15 June 2026)

Grand Slam doubles results
- Australian Open: SF (2024, 2025)
- French Open: 3R (2022, 2024)
- Wimbledon: F (2024)
- US Open: W (2023, 2025)

Other doubles tournaments
- Tour Finals: W (2024)
- Olympic Games: 1R (2024)

Grand Slam mixed doubles results
- Australian Open: SF (2025)
- French Open: QF (2024, 2026)
- Wimbledon: SF (2024)
- US Open: 1R (2022, 2024, 2026)

Team competitions
- Fed Cup: 19–11 (doubles 14-7)
Medal record
Representing Ontario
Women's tennis
Canada Summer Games
| Gold medal – first place | 2013 Sherbrooke | Singles |
- Last updated on: 17 June 2026.

Erin Hope Routliffe (born 11 April 1995) is a New Zealand professional tennis player who specializes in doubles. She represented Canada internationally until 2017. In her career, she has won two major doubles titles at the 2023 and 2025 US Open, partnering with Gabriela Dabrowski, thus becoming the second Kiwi woman to win a major in the Open Era, after 1979 Australian Open women's doubles champion, Judy Connor.

Routliffe is also a former world No. 1 in doubles, first achieving the feat on 15 July 2024. She and Dabrowski won the doubles title at the 2024 WTA Finals. Routliffe has won 12 WTA Tour doubles titles and represented New Zealand in the BJK Cup and at the 2024 Summer Olympics.

== Early life ==
Routliffe was born in New Zealand while her Canadian parents, Robert Routliffe and Catherine MacLennan, were on an around-the-world sailing adventure. They stayed there four years before returning to Canada. She has two sisters, Tara and Tess, the latter being an international para-swimmer. Both were also born in Auckland. She made the move to Montreal in September 2011 to train at the National Training Centre and stayed there until 2013.

== Career ==
=== College years ===
She studied at the University of Alabama, majoring in public relations, and was part of its tennis team from September 2013 until her graduation in May 2017. Routliffe was a two-time NCAA doubles champion with Maya Jansen for the 2014 and 2015 seasons.

=== 2010–2011: First ITF events ===
In October 2010, Routliffe won the doubles title at the G4 in Burlington, Ontario. She won her first junior singles title at the same tournament a year later. In October 2011, she reached the quarterfinals in both singles and doubles at the 50k Challenger de Saguenay, with a win over Alizé Lim in the second round. She reached her second straight 50k doubles quarterfinal in Toronto the next week.

=== 2012: Junior Wimbledon and US Open quarterfinals ===
In April, Routliffe won the singles and doubles titles at the G2 in Cap-d'Ail. Later that month she made the doubles final of the G1 in Beaulieu-sur-Mer. She lost in the first round in singles at the junior French Open and Wimbledon, but reached the quarterfinals in doubles at Wimbledon. In August, she was awarded a wildcard in the qualifying draw at the Rogers Cup and made it to the second round. She made the doubles final of the G1 in Repentigny, Quebec in September. She was defeated in the first round in singles of the junior US Open, but reached the quarterfinals in doubles. She won the doubles title at the GB1 in Tulsa, Oklahoma with Carol Zhao, defeating Charlotte Petrick and Denise Starr in the final. Routliffe also reached two doubles quarterfinals in October: at the 50k Challengers in Saguenay and Toronto.

=== 2013–14: Canada Summer Games gold medal ===
Routliffe lost in the first round in singles of the junior 2013 Australian Open, but made the quarterfinals in doubles for her third straight major event. In February, she reached her first professional doubles final at the 25k tournament in Launceston, Tasmania. She was defeated in the first round in singles and the second in doubles at the junior 2013 French Open. At the beginning of July 2012, Routliffe made it to the semifinals in doubles at the 50k Cooper Challenger. In August, she won the gold medal in singles at the 2013 Canada Summer Games in Sherbrooke.

In July 2014, Routliffe and partner Carol Zhao made it to the semifinals at the 25k Challenger de Gatineau. A week later at the 25k Granby Challenger, she and Zhao reached the third doubles final of her career. They were supposed to face Hiroko Kuwata and Riko Sawayanagi for the title, but had to withdraw because of an injury.

=== 2015–16: Maiden professional singles final ===
In July 2015, Routliffe reached the doubles final in Granby (now a 50k event) for the second straight year, this time with Laura Robson, but they were defeated in straight sets by Australians Jessica Moore and Storm Sanders. The following month, Routliffe and partner Maya Jansen won the US Open National Playoffs in doubles, and were awarded a wildcard for the main draw. They were defeated in the first round by Raquel Kops-Jones and Abigail Spears.

Routliffe advanced to her first professional singles final in July 2016, at the 25k Winnipeg Challenger, where she was defeated by fellow qualifier Francesca Di Lorenzo in straight sets. In early October 2016, she won her first professional doubles title, partnering Andie Daniell, at Charleston, South Carolina.

=== 2017–18: Nationality switch, Fed Cup debut, first WTA Tour final ===
In June 2017, the ITF agreed to allow Routliffe to change her representational nationality to the country of her birth. Routliffe played her first Fed Cup ties for New Zealand against Turkmenistan and Uzbekistan in July, dropping only one game in her winning debut over Guljan Muhammetkuliyeva. In October 2017, this time with Di Lorenzo as her partner, she made it to the doubles final at the 60k Saguenay Challenger, Canada, but they had to withdraw following an injury to Di Lorenzo. The next week at the 60k Challenger in Toronto, she won her second doubles title, defeating Ysaline Bonaventure and Victoria Rodríguez, partnering Alexa Guarachi. In December, she reached the doubles final with Maya Jansen at a 15k event in Solapur, India.

In January 2018, with fellow New Zealander Jade Lewis, Routliffe won her third and fourth doubles titles, in consecutive weeks at ITF tournaments in Sharm El Sheikh. A week later, she collected her third successive title at the same venue, this time in singles over Nadja Gilchrist.

Routliffe then joined the New Zealand team in Bahrain for their 2018 Fed Cup Asia/Oceania Group II playoffs. Rested for the first day's tie against Lebanon, Routliffe had her first match the following day when New Zealand met top seeds Uzbekistan. Playing for the second time against its top player Sabina Sharipova (she had played her in the 2017 Fed Cup tie as well), Routliffe lost in straight sets. Losing all three rubbers, New Zealand nevertheless finished second in the group, and moved through to the 5th-8th place play-offs against Pakistan the following day, where Routliffe defeated Ushna Sohail in straight sets.

In Irapuato, Mexico, Routliffe won her third ITF doubles title for the year when she teamed with Alexa Guarachi again. They followed that with a loss in the semifinals at Jackson, Mississippi but won another title together a week later in Pelham, Alabama, and won their third title in four weeksin Dothan. The latter event, being an 80k tournament, was the biggest win for both players. They lost in the quarterfinals of the next tournament at the 80k-level in Charlottesville, Virginia but then won again in the last of the three events, at Charleston, South Carolina, where they beat Louisa Chirico and Allie Kiick.

Routliffe then went to South Korea to start a series of tournaments in Asia. With a new partner in Victoria Rodríguez, she lost in the semifinals of the first event in Incheon. Moving on to Thailand, the pair took out the title at the first tournament they played in Hua Hin, and completed the tournament double by winning again a week later.

Routliffe and Guarachi qualified for the 2018 Wimbledon Championships, but lost to the eventual champions Barbora Krejčíková and Kateřina Siniaková in the first round of the main-draw.

Teaming again with Guarachi at the 2018 Washington Open, her first WTA Tour event, they made the final, where they lost in straight sets to third seeds Han Xinyun and Darija Jurak.

At the 2018 New Zealand Championships, Routliffe lost in the semifinals of the singles to Valentina Ivanov, but won the doubles as top seed with Paige Hourigan.

=== 2019: Mixed results ===
Given a wildcard into singles qualifying in Auckland, Routliffe was beaten in straight sets by Alexandra Panova. She and Guarachi lost to against Tímea Babos and Julia Görges in the doubles. They both went on to Hobart but took different partners, with Routliffe and Vera Lapko losing in the first round. Routliffe's next event was the Newport Beach Challenger in California, where she and Kristie Ahn lost in the first round to Manasse and Pegula.

She then had a series of tournaments where she lost in either the first or second round, until she came to defend her title in Irapuato. She and Anna Danilina lost in the semifinals, 6–7, 4–6 to the eventual champions Paige Hourigan and Australian Astra Sharma. She lost in the quarterfinals of her next two tournaments in Mexico, and then in the first round of the WTA tournament in Bogotá.

From there it was to the U.S. clay-court swing where, with Alexa Guarachi, they attempted to defend their title in Dothan, but were upset in the first round by Beatrice Gumulya and Abbie Myers. Routliffe teamed with Di Lorenzo to reach the quarterfinals in Charlottesville, and then with Allie Kiick to reach the semifinals at the next event in Charleston. At Bonita Springs, Guarachi and Routliffe won the tournament.

A semifinal loss in Spain was followed by a first-round exit at Surbiton and then a defeat in the quarterfinals at Nottingham to Monica Niculescu and Elena-Gabriela Ruse.

Routliffe then teamed with Madison Brengle for Wimbledon, losing in the first round to Han Xinyun and Oksana Kalashnikova. First or second round losses followed in Routliffe's next four tournaments. She teamed with Naomi Broady at the Vancouver Open to reach the final, losing to Nao Hibino and Miyu Kato.

=== 2020: Interrupted season ===
Routliffe was given wildcards for both the qualifying singles and doubles at the Auckland Open. She lost her first singles match to Sara Errani, and she and Allie Kiick lost to Caroline Garcia and Julia Görges in the first round of doubles.

Her next stop was an ITF tournament in Burnie. She had to retire from her second round singles in qualifying against Irina Ramialison. She entered the main-draw as a lucky loser, and she was drawn to face Ramialison again. This time, she won in straight sets, but she lost her second round match to Maddison Inglis. She partnered Fanny Stollár in the doubles, and they lost their quarterfinal against Paige Hourigan and Destanee Aiava.

The ITF Circuit resumed in New Zealand after a break of seven years, the first women's event being in Hamilton. Routliffe and Emily Fanning won the doubles title.

Two tournaments in Perth followed, with Routliffe losing in the first round of singles in the first week, and in the final qualifying round in the second. She and Jaimee Fourlis were finalists in the first doubles event, but Routliffe had to default in the quarter-finals in the second week when her partner Arina Rodionova was injured playing singles. The latter had recovered by the time they moved to Mildura for the following week, and they made the final, losing to Tereza Mihalíková and Abbie Myers.

Playing doubles only, Routliffe resumed in the first tournament after the break because of COVID, the Lexington Challenger (with Robin Anderson), but lost in the first round, as she did in Prague (with Ingrid Neel), the tournament replacing the qualifying events for the US Open. She and Naomi Broady got to the quarterfinals of the İstanbul Cup, but she and Neel had another first-round defeat when they played in Cagnes-sur-Mer.

In Porto, she and Jana Fett were runners-up in a 25k tournament, and she equalled that result when she and Jamie Loeb were runners-up in Orlando, losing to Rasheeda McAdoo and Alycia Parks.

=== 2021–22: First WTA Tour title, major quarterfinal, top 30 ===
Routliffe won her first WTA Tour title in doubles at the 2021 Palermo Ladies Open, teaming with Kimberley Zimmermann to defeat Natela Dzalamidze and Kamilla Rakhimova in the final.

In January 2022, she reached the semifinals of the Adelaide International 2 with Alicja Rosolska. They reached the quarterfinals on the WTA 1000 level at the Qatar Ladies Open and the Miami Open. The pair also reached two more finals, at the WTA 500 St. Petersburg Ladies' Trophy and the Bad Homburg Open.

In her debut at the French Open, she reached the third round for the first time in her career with Rosolska. She teamed with Rosolska for the Wimbledon Championships where she reached the quarterfinals seeded 11th for the first time at a major, becoming the first woman from New Zealand since Marina Erakovic to reach the last eight in 2011.

She made her top-30 debut at world No. 29, on 8 August 2022, following her title at the Washington Open with Jessica Pegula.

Returning to New Zealand for her first tournaments in nearly three years, she and Paige Hourigan won the doubles title at the inaugural 25k Eves Open in Papamoa.

=== 2023: US Open doubles title, WTA singles debut ===
She made her singles WTA Tour main-draw debut at home at Auckland as a wildcard entrant. She fell in three sets to Elena-Gabriela Ruse in the first round. Routliffe won her third doubles title partnering Aldila Sutjiadi at the 2023 ATX Open. They defeated top seeds Nicole Melichar-Martinez and Ellen Perez in three sets to claim the title.

At Strasbourg, she was awarded a lucky-loser place in the main-draw after losing in straight sets to Angelina Gabueva in the last round of qualifying. In the main draw, she defeated Hsieh Su-wei, earning her first WTA Tour main-draw singles win, before withdrawing from tournament before her second-round match against Elina Svitolina.

In August, ranked No. 54 in doubles and seeded 16th as a pair with new partner Gabriela Dabrowski at the US Open, Routliffe won her first Grand Slam title, defeating Laura Siegemund and Vera Zvonareva in the final in straight sets. With the win, Routliffe entered the top 20 for the first time in her career.

At the Guadalajara Open the pair Routliffe/Dabrowski reached their first WTA 1000 final, where they lost to Storm Hunter and Elise Mertens. Their win at the Zhengzhou Open qualified them for the 2023 WTA Finals in Cancún, making her the first player from New Zealand to compete in the prestigious year-end event, and took Routliffe to a new career-high ranking of world No. 13 on 16 October 2023 and to No. 12 a week later. With reaching the semifinals at the WTA Finals, Routliffe reached No. 11 on 6 November 2023.

=== 2024: WTA Finals champion, Wimbledon final, world No. 1 ===
Routliffe reached a second WTA 1000 final with Gabriela Dabrowski at the Miami Open where the pair lost to alternates Bethanie Mattek-Sands and Sofia Kenin in a deciding champions tiebreak.

Partnering Coco Gauff, she reached also the final at the Italian Open and a new career-high ranking of No. 3 on 20 May 2024.

By winning her sixth title in June, at the Nottingham Open and first on grass courts with Dabrowski, over Harriet Dart and Diane Parry, she reached a new career-high ranking of No. 2 on 17 June 2024.

Alongside Dabrowski, she reached the final at Wimbledon losing to Kateřina Siniaková and Taylor Townsend. As a result, Routliffe became the world No. 1 player in doubles after the tournament, on 15 July. She also reached the semifinals in mixed doubles with fellow New Zealander Michael Venus.

Seeded second at the WTA Finals in Riyadh, Saudi Arabia, Dabrowski and Routliffe went unbeaten to top their group and reach the semifinals, where they defeated Nicole Melichar-Martinez and Ellen Perez in straight sets. Routliffe and Dabrowski defeated Kateřina Siniaková and Taylor Townsend in the final to claim their first WTA Tour Finals title. In the process Routliffe became the first New Zealander to win a WTA Finals title.

=== 2025: Second US Open title ===
Seeded second, Routliffe and Dabrowski reached the semifinals at the Australian Open, but lost to Jeļena Ostapenko and Hsieh Su-wei.

Partnering Jeļena Ostapenko, she won the doubles title at the Charleston Open in April, defeating Caroline Dolehide and Desirae Krawczyk in the final. Reunited with Dabrowski later that month, Routliffe won the doubles title at the Stuttgart Open, overcoming Ekaterina Alexandrova and Zhang Shuai in the final.

In August, Routliffe and Dabrowski won their first WTA 1000 title as a team at the Cincinnati Open, defeating Guo Hanyu and Alexandra Panova in the final.

The following month they secured their second US Open title together, overcoming top seeds Siniaková and Townsend in the final in straight sets.

Defending their title at the year-end WTA Finals, Routliffe and Dabrowski were eliminated in the round-robin stage with a record of one win and two losses leaving them in their group on third place.

== Grand Slam doubles performance timeline ==
Key
| W | F | SF | QF | #R | RR | Q# | DNQ | A | NH |

(W) winner; (F) finalist; (SF) semifinalist; (QF) quarterfinalist; (#R) rounds 4, 3, 2, 1; (RR) round-robin stage; (Q#) qualification round; (DNQ) did not qualify; (A) absent; (NH) not held; (SR) strike rate (events won / competed); (W–L) win–loss record.
To avoid confusion and double counting, these charts are updated at the conclusion of a tournament or when the player's participation has ended.

| Tournament | 2015 | ... | 2018 | 2019 | 2020 | 2021 | 2022 | 2023 | 2024 | 2025 | 2026 | W–L |
|---|---|---|---|---|---|---|---|---|---|---|---|---|
| Australian Open | A | | A | A | A | A | 1R | 1R | SF | SF | 3R | 10–5 |
| French Open | A | | A | A | A | A | 3R | 1R | 3R | 1R | 2R | 5–5 |
| Wimbledon | A | | 1R | 1R | NH | A | QF | 1R | F | QF | 1R | 11–7 |
| US Open | 1R | | A | A | A | 3R | 2R | W | QF | W | | 18–4 |
| Win–loss | 0–1 | | 0–1 | 0–1 | 0–0 | 2–1 | 6–4 | 6–3 | 14–4 | 13–3 | 3–3 | 44–21 |

== Grand Slam tournaments finals ==
=== Doubles: 3 (2 titles, 1 runner-up) ===
| Result | Year | Tournament | Surface | Partner | Opponents | Score |
|---|---|---|---|---|---|---|
| Win | 2023 | US Open | Hard | (Canada) Gabriela Dabrowski | (Germany) Laura Siegemund; Vera Zvonareva | 7–6^{(11–9)}, 6–3 |
| Loss | 2024 | Wimbledon | Grass | (Canada) Gabriela Dabrowski | (United States) Taylor Townsend (Czech Republic) Kateřina Siniaková | 6–7^{(5–7)}, 6–7^{(1–7)} |
| Win | 2025 | US Open | Hard | (Canada) Gabriela Dabrowski | (United States) Taylor Townsend (Czech Republic) Kateřina Siniaková | 6–4, 6–4 |

== Other significant finals ==
=== WTA 1000 tournaments ===
==== Doubles: 6 (2 titles, 4 runner-ups) ====
| Result | Year | Tournament | Surface | Partner | Opponents | Score |
|---|---|---|---|---|---|---|
| Loss | 2023 | Guadalajara Open | Hard | (Canada) Gabriela Dabrowski | (Australia) Storm Hunter (Belgium) Elise Mertens | 6–3, 2–6, [4–10] |
| Loss | 2024 | Miami Open | Hard | (Canada) Gabriela Dabrowski | (United States) Sofia Kenin (United States) Bethanie Mattek-Sands | 6–4, 6–7^{(5–7)}, [9–11] |
| Loss | 2024 | Italian Open | Clay | (United States) Coco Gauff | (Italy) Sara Errani (Italy) Jasmine Paolini | 3–6, 6–4, [8–10] |
| Loss | 2024 | Canadian Open | Hard | (Canada) Gabriela Dabrowski | (United States) Caroline Dolehide (United States) Desirae Krawczyk | 6–7^{(2–7)}, 6–3, [7–10] |
| Win | 2024 | Cincinnati Open | Hard | (United States) Asia Muhammad | (Canada) Leylah Fernandez (Kazakhstan) Yulia Putintseva | 3–6, 6–1, [10–4] |
| Win | 2025 | Cincinnati Open | Hard | (Canada) Gabriela Dabrowski | (China) Guo Hanyu; Alexandra Panova | 6–4, 6–3 |

== WTA Tour finals ==
=== Doubles: 25 (13 titles, 12 runner-ups) ===
| Legend Grand Slam (2–1) WTA Finals (1–0) WTA 1000 (2–4) WTA 500 (4–4) WTA 250 (4–3) | Finals by surface Hard (9–8) Clay (3–1) Grass (1–3) | Finals by setting Outdoor (11–8) Indoor (2–4) |

| Result | W–L | Date | Tournament | Tier | Surface | Partner | Opponents | Score |
|---|---|---|---|---|---|---|---|---|
| Loss | 0–1 | Aug 2018 | Washington Open, US | International (Note: The WTA International tournaments were reclassified as WTA 250 tournaments in 2021.) | Hard | (Chile) Alexa Guarachi | (China) Han Xinyun (Croatia) Darija Jurak | 3–6, 2–6 |
| Win | 1–1 | Jul 2021 | Palermo Ladies Open, Italy | WTA 250 | Clay | (Belgium) Kimberley Zimmermann | (Russia) Natela Dzalamidze (Russia) Kamilla Rakhimova | 7–6^{(7–5)}, 4–6, [10–4] |
| Loss | 1–2 | Sep 2021 | Luxembourg Open, Luxembourg | WTA 250 | Hard (i) | (Belgium) Kimberley Zimmermann | (Belgium) Greet Minnen (Belgium) Alison Van Uytvanck | 3–6, 3–6 |
| Loss | 1–3 | Sep 2021 | Ostrava Open, Czech Republic | WTA 500 | Hard (i) | (United States) Kaitlyn Christian | (India) Sania Mirza (China) Zhang Shuai | 3–6, 2–6 |
| Loss | 1–4 | Feb 2022 | St. Petersburg Trophy, Russia | WTA 500 | Hard (i) | (Poland) Alicja Rosolska | (Russia) Anna Kalinskaya (United States) Caty McNally | 3–6, 7–6^{(7–5)}, [4–10] |
| Loss | 1–5 | Jun 2022 | Bad Homburg Open, Germany | WTA 250 | Grass | (Poland) Alicja Rosolska | (Japan) Eri Hozumi (Japan) Makoto Ninomiya | 4–6, 7–6^{(7–5)}, [5–10] |
| Win | 2–5 | Aug 2022 | Washington Open, US | WTA 250 | Hard | (United States) Jessica Pegula | Anna Kalinskaya (United States) Caty McNally | 6–3, 5–7, [12–10] |
| Loss | 2–6 | Oct 2022 | Ostrava Open, Czech Republic | WTA 500 | Hard (i) | (Poland) Alicja Rosolska | (United States) Caty McNally (United States) Alycia Parks | 3–6, 2–6 |
| Win | 3–6 | Mar 2023 | ATX Open, US | WTA 250 | Hard | (Indonesia) Aldila Sutjiadi | (United States) Nicole Melichar-Martinez (Australia) Ellen Perez | 6–4, 3–6, [10–8] |
| Win | 4–6 | Sep 2023 | US Open, US | Grand Slam | Hard | (Canada) Gabriela Dabrowski | (Germany) Laura Siegemund; Vera Zvonareva | 7–6^{(11–9)}, 6–3 |
| Loss | 4–7 | Sep 2023 | Guadalajara Open, Mexico | WTA 1000 | Hard | (Canada) Gabriela Dabrowski | (Australia) Storm Hunter (Belgium) Elise Mertens | 6–3, 2–6, [4–10] |
| Win | 5–7 | Oct 2023 | Zhengzhou Open, China | WTA 500 | Hard | (Canada) Gabriela Dabrowski | (Japan) Shuko Aoyama (Japan) Ena Shibahara | 6–2, 6–4 |
| Loss | 5–8 | Mar 2024 | Miami Open, US | WTA 1000 | Hard | (Canada) Gabriela Dabrowski | (United States) Sofia Kenin (United States) Bethanie Mattek-Sands | 6–4, 6–7^{(5–7)}, [9–11] |
| Loss | 5–9 | May 2024 | Italian Open, Italy | WTA 1000 | Clay | (United States) Coco Gauff | (Italy) Sara Errani (Italy) Jasmine Paolini | 3–6, 6–4, [8–10] |
| Win | 6–9 | Jun 2024 | Nottingham Open, UK | WTA 250 | Grass | (Canada) Gabriela Dabrowski | (United Kingdom) Harriet Dart (France) Diane Parry | 5–7, 6–3, [11–9] |
| Loss | 6–10 | Jun 2024 | Eastbourne International, UK | WTA 500 | Grass | (Canada) Gabriela Dabrowski | (Ukraine) Lyudmyla Kichenok (Latvia) Jeļena Ostapenko | 7–5, 6–7^{(2–7)}, [8–10] |
| Loss | 6–11 | Jul 2024 | Wimbledon Championships, UK | Grand Slam | Hard | (Canada) Gabriela Dabrowski | (Czech Republic) Kateřina Siniaková (United States) Taylor Townsend | 6–7^{(5–7)}, 6–7^{(1–7)} |
| Loss | 6–12 | Aug 2024 | Canadian Open, Canada | WTA 1000 | Hard | (Canada) Gabriela Dabrowski | (United States) Caroline Dolehide (United States) Desirae Krawczyk | 6–7^{(2–7)}, 6–3, [7–10] |
| Win | 7–12 | Aug 2024 | Cincinnati Open, US | WTA 1000 | Hard | (United States) Asia Muhammad | (Canada) Leylah Fernandez (Kazakhstan) Yulia Putintseva | 3–6, 6–1, [10–4] |
| Win | 8–12 | Nov 2024 | WTA Finals, Saudi Arabia | Finals | Hard (i) | (Canada) Gabriela Dabrowski | (Czech Republic) Kateřina Siniaková (United States) Taylor Townsend | 7–5, 6–3 |
| Win | 9–12 | Mar 2025 | Charleston Open, US | WTA 500 | Clay | (Latvia) Jeļena Ostapenko | (United States) Caroline Dolehide (United States) Desirae Krawczyk | 6–4, 6–2 |
| Win | 10–12 | Apr 2025 | Stuttgart Open, Germany | WTA 500 | Clay (i) | (Canada) Gabriela Dabrowski | Ekaterina Alexandrova (China) Zhang Shuai | 6–3, 6–3 |
| Win | 11–12 | Aug 2025 | Cincinnati Open, US | WTA 1000 | Hard | (Canada) Gabriela Dabrowski | (China) Guo Hanyu; Alexandra Panova | 6–4, 6–3 |
| Win | 12–12 | Sep 2025 | US Open, US | Grand Slam | Hard | (Canada) Gabriela Dabrowski | (Czech Republic) Kateřina Siniaková (United States) Taylor Townsend | 6–4, 6–4 |
| Win | 13–12 | Jul 2026 | Washington DC Open, US | WTA 500 | Hard | (Indonesia) Aldila Sutjiadi | (Slovenia) Andreja Klepač (Japan) Makoto Ninomiya | 6–4, 6–1 |

== WTA 125 finals ==
=== Doubles: 2 (2 runner-ups) ===
| Result | W–L | Date | Tournament | Surface | Partner | Opponents | Score |
|---|---|---|---|---|---|---|---|
| Loss | 0–1 | Jul 2021 | Charleston Pro, United States | Clay | (Indonesia) Aldila Sutjiadi | (Chinese Taipei) Liang En-shuo (Canada) Rebecca Marino | 7–5, 5–7, [7–10] |
| Loss | 0–2 | May 2023 | Catalonia Open, Spain | Clay | (Chile) Alexa Guarachi | (Australia) Storm Hunter (Australia) Ellen Perez | 1–6, 6–7^{(8–10)} |

== ITF Circuit finals ==
=== Singles: 2 (1 title, 1 runner-up) ===
| Legend W25 tournaments (0–1) W15 tournaments (1–0) | Finals by surface Hard (1–1) |

| Result | W–L | Date | Tournament | Tier | Surface | Opponent | Score |
|---|---|---|---|---|---|---|---|
| Loss | 0–1 | Jul 2016 | Winnipeg Challenger, Canada | W25 | Hard | (United States) Francesca Di Lorenzo | 4–6, 1–6 |
| Win | 1–1 | Feb 2018 | ITF Sharm El Sheikh, Egypt | W15 | Hard | (United States) Nadja Gilchrist | 6–3, 7–5 |

=== Doubles: 29 (16 titles, 13 runner-ups) ===
| Legend $100,000 tournaments (2–1) $80,000 tournaments (2–0) $50/60,000 tournaments (2–3) $25,000 tournaments (6–7) $10/15,000 tournaments (4–2) | Finals by surface Hard (10–10) Clay (6–2) Grass (0–1) |

| Result | W–L | Date | Tournament | Tier | Surface | Partner | Opponents | Score |
|---|---|---|---|---|---|---|---|---|
| Loss | 0–1 | Feb 2013 | Launceston International, Australia | 25,000 | Hard | (United States) Allie Kiick | (Russia) Ksenia Lykina (United Kingdom) Emily Webley-Smith | 5–7, 3–6 |
| Loss | 0–2 | May 2013 | ITF Pula, Italy | 10,000 | Clay | (Canada) Carol Zhao | (Italy) Martina Caregaro (Italy) Anna Floris | 2–6, 7–5, [7–10] |
| Loss | 0–3 | Jul 2014 | Challenger de Granby, Canada | 25,000 | Hard | (Canada) Carol Zhao | (Japan) Hiroko Kuwata (Japan) Riko Sawayanagi | w/o |
| Loss | 0–4 | Jul 2015 | Challenger de Granby, Canada | 50,000 | Hard | (United Kingdom) Laura Robson | (Australia) Jessica Moore (Australia) Storm Sanders | 5–7, 2–6 |
| Win | 1–4 | Oct 2016 | ITF Charleston, United States | 10,000 | Clay | (United States) Andie Daniell | (United States) Quinn Gleason (United States) Whitney Kay | 6–4, 6–2 |
| Loss | 1–5 | Oct 2017 | Challenger de Saguenay, Canada | 60,000 | Hard (i) | (United States) Francesca Di Lorenzo | (Canada) Bianca Andreescu (Canada) Carol Zhao | w/o |
| Win | 2–5 | Nov 2017 | Toronto Challenger, Canada | 60,000 | Hard (i) | (Chile) Alexa Guarachi | (Belgium) Ysaline Bonaventure (Mexico) Victoria Rodríguez | 7–6^{(4)}, 3–6, [10–4] |
| Loss | 2–6 | Dec 2017 | ITF Solapur, India | 15,000 | Hard | (United States) Maya Jansen | (Chinese Taipei) Hsu Ching-wen (India) Pranjala Yadlapalli | 5–7, 6–1, [6–10] |
| Win | 3–6 | Jan 2018 | ITF Sharm El Sheikh, Egypt | 15,000 | Hard | (New Zealand) Jade Lewis | (Russia) Anastasia Potapova (Russia) Ekaterina Yashina | 0–6, 7–5, [10–6] |
| Win | 4–6 | Jan 2018 | ITF Sharm El Sheikh, Egypt | 15,000 | Hard | (New Zealand) Jade Lewis | (Turkey) Berfu Cengiz (Bosnia and Herzegovina) Jasmina Tinjic | 6–1, 5–7, [12–10] |
| Win | 5–6 | Mar 2018 | ITF Irapuato, Mexico | 25,000 | Hard | (Chile) Alexa Guarachi | (United States) Desirae Krawczyk (Mexico) Giuliana Olmos | 4–6, 6–2, [10–6] |
| Win | 6–6 | Apr 2018 | ITF Pelham, United States | 25,000 | Clay | (Chile) Alexa Guarachi | (United States) Maria Mateas (Mexico) María Portillo Ramírez | 6–1, 6–2 |
| Win | 7–6 | Apr 2018 | Dothan Pro Classic, US | 80,000 | Clay | (Chile) Alexa Guarachi | (United States) Sofia Kenin (United States) Jamie Loeb | 6–4, 2–6, [11–9] |
| Win | 8–6 | May 2018 | ITF Charleston Pro, US | 80,000 | Clay | (Chile) Alexa Guarachi | (United States) Louisa Chirico (United States) Allie Kiick | 6–1, 3–6, [10–5] |
| Win | 9–6 | Jun 2018 | ITF Hua Hin, Thailand | 25,000 | Hard | (Mexico) Victoria Rodríguez | (Thailand) Nicha Lertpitaksinchai (Thailand) Peangtarn Plipuech | 7–5, 3–6, [10–6] |
| Win | 10–6 | Jun 2018 | ITF Hua Hin, Thailand | 25,000 | Hard | (Mexico) Victoria Rodríguez | (Japan) Mana Ayukawa (Switzerland) Nina Stadler | 6–4, 6–4 |
| Loss | 10–7 | Sep 2018 | ITF Cairns, Australia | 25,000 | Hard | (Australia) Astra Sharma | (Australia) Naiktha Bains (China) Xu Shilin | 1–6, 6–7^{(7)} |
| Win | 11–7 | Oct 2018 ^{1} | ITF Toowoomba, Australia | 25,000 | Hard | (United Kingdom) Freya Christie | (Australia) Samantha Harris (Australia) Astra Sharma | 7–5, 6–4 |
| Win | 12–7 | May 2019 | Bonita Springs Championship, US | W100 | Clay | (Chile) Alexa Guarachi | (United States) Usue Maitane Arconada (United States) Caroline Dolehide | 6–3, 7–6^{(5)} |
| Loss | 12–8 | Aug 2019 | Vancouver Open, Canada | W100 | Hard | (United Kingdom) Naomi Broady | (Japan) Nao Hibino (Japan) Miyu Kato | 2–6, 2–6 |
| Win | 13–8 | Feb 2020 | ITF Hamilton, New Zealand | W15 | Hard | (New Zealand) Emily Fanning | (United States) Sabastiani León (Hong Kong) Maggie Ng | 6–3, 6–1 |
| Loss | 13–9 | Feb 2020 | ITF Perth, Australia | W25 | Hard | (Australia) Jaimee Fourlis | (Japan) Kanako Morisaki (Japan) Erika Sema | 5–7, 4–6 |
| Loss | 13–10 | Mar 2020 | ITF Mildura, Australia | W25 | Grass | (Australia) Arina Rodionova | (Slovakia) Tereza Mihalíková (Australia) Abbie Myers | 3–6, 2–6 |
| Loss | 13–11 | Oct 2020 | ITF Porto, Portugal | W25 | Hard | (Croatia) Jana Fett | (United States) Jamie Loeb (Mexico) Ana Sofía Sánchez | 6–2, 3–6, [8–10] |
| Loss | 13–12 | Nov 2020 | ITF Orlando, US | W25 | Hard | (United States) Jamie Loeb | (United States) Rasheeda McAdoo (United States) Alycia Parks | 6–4, 1–6, [9–11] |
| Loss | 13–13 | May 2021 | Charlottesville Open, US | W60 | Clay | (Indonesia) Aldila Sutjiadi | (Kazakhstan) Anna Danilina (Australia) Arina Rodionova | 1–6, 3–6 |
| Win | 14–13 | May 2021 | Bonita Springs Championship, US (2) | W100 | Clay | (Indonesia) Aldila Sutjiadi | (Japan) Eri Hozumi (Japan) Miyu Kato | 6–3, 4–6, [10–6] |
| Win | 15–13 | Dec 2022 | ITF Tauranga, New Zealand | W25 | Hard | (New Zealand) Paige Hourigan | (India) Ashmitha Easwaramurthi (Japan) Yuka Hosoki | 6–1, 6–0 |
| Win | 16–13 | Feb 2024 | Burnie International, Australia | W60 | Hard | (New Zealand) Paige Hourigan | (Japan) Kyoka Okamura (Japan) Ayano Shimizu | 7–6^{(5)}, 6–4 |

Note 1: rain stopped play on 12 October with the score at 1–3 in the first set, and also prevented play the following day. The match was completed on 14 October.

== Fed Cup/Billie Jean King Cup competitions ==
=== Singles (4–2) ===
| Edition | Stage | Date | Location | Against | Surface | Opponent | W/L | Score |
|---|---|---|---|---|---|---|---|---|
| 2017 | Z2 R/R | Jul 2017 | Dushanbe, Tajikistan | Turkmenistan | Hard | (Turkmenistan) Guljan Muhammetkuliyeva | W | 6–1, 6–0 |
| 2017 | Z2 R/R | Jul 2017 | Dushanbe, Tajikistan | Uzbekistan | Hard | (Uzbekistan) Sabina Sharipova | L | 3–6, 1–6 |
| 2017 | Z2 P/O | Jul 2017 | Dushanbe, Tajikistan | Sri Lanka | Hard | (Sri Lanka) Nethmi Himashi Waduge | W | 6–2, 6–0 |
| 2018 | Z2 R/R | Feb 2018 | Bahrain | Uzbekistan | Hard | (Uzbekistan) Sabina Sharipova | L | 5–7, 1–6 |
| 2018 | Z2 P/O | Feb 2018 | Bahrain | Pakistan | Hard | (Pakistan) Ushna Sohail | W | 6–3, 6–1 |
| 2019 | Z2 P/O | Jun 2019 | Kuala Lumpur, Malaysia | Malaysia | Hard | (Malaysia) Sharifah Elysia Wan Abdul Rahman | W | 6–0, 6–0 |

=== Doubles (10–4) ===
| Edition | Stage | Date | Location | Against | Surface | Partner | Opponents | W/L | Score |
|---|---|---|---|---|---|---|---|---|---|
| 2017 | Z2 R/R | Jul 2017 | Dushanbe, Tajikistan | Turkmenistan | Hard | Joanna Carswell | (Turkmenistan) Jahan Bayramova (Turkmenistan) Guljan Muhammetkuliyeva | W | 6–2, 6–1 |
| 2017 | Z2 R/R | Jul 2017 | Dushanbe, Tajikistan | Uzbekistan | Hard | Joanna Carswell | (Uzbekistan) Akgul Amanmuradova (Uzbekistan) Komola Umarova | L | 3–6, 4–6 |
| 2019 | Z2 R/R | Jun 2019 | Kuala Lumpur, Malaysia | Bangladesh | Hard | Paige Hourigan | (Bangladesh) Mashfia Afrin (Bangladesh) Susmita Sen | W | 6–0, 6–1 |
| 2019 | Z2 R/R | Jun 2019 | Kuala Lumpur, Malaysia | Pakistan | Hard | Valentina Ivanov | (Pakistan) Meheq Khokhar (Pakistan) Noor Malik | W | 6–0, 6–1 |
| 2019 | Z2 R/R | Jun 2019 | Kuala Lumpur, Malaysia | Hong Kong | Hard | Valentina Ivanov | (Hong Kong) Ng Kwan-yau (Hong Kong) Wu Ho-ching | W | 6–2, 6–2 |
| 2019 | Z2 P/O | Jun 2019 | Kuala Lumpur, Malaysia | Malaysia | Hard | Valentina Ivanov | (Malaysia) Sara Nayar (Malaysia) Jawairiah Noordin | W | 6–3, 4–6, 6–3 |
| 2020 | Z2 R/R | Feb 2020 | Wellington, New Zealand | Mongolia | Hard | Kelly Southwood | (Mongolia) Jargal Altansarnai (Mongolia) Bolor Enkhbayar | W | 6–2, 6–1 |
| 2020 | Z2 R/R | Feb 2020 | Wellington, New Zealand | Pakistan | Hard | Valentina Ivanov | (Pakistan) Mahin Qureshi (Pakistan) Ushna Suhail | W | 6–1, 6–0 |
| 2020 | Z2 R/R | Feb 2020 | Wellington, New Zealand | Singapore | Hard | Emily Fanning | (Singapore) Sarah Pang (Singapore) Tammy Tan | W | 6–0, 6–0 |
| 2022 | G1 R/R | Apr 2022 | Antalya, Turkey | China | Clay | Valentina Ivanov | (China) Xu Yifan (China) Yang Zhaoxuan | L | 3–6, 1–6 |
| 2022 | G1 R/R | Apr 2022 | Antalya, Turkey | (South Korea) Korea | Clay | Paige Hourigan | (South Korea) Kim Dabin (South Korea) Kim Na-ri | L | 2–6, 6–2, 6–7^{(6–8)} |
| 2022 | G1 R/R | Apr 2022 | Antalya, Turkey | Japan | Clay | Paige Hourigan | (Japan) Shuko Aoyama (Japan) Ena Shibahara | L | 3–6, 6–4, 2–6 |
| 2022 | G1 R/R | Apr 2022 | Antalya, Turkey | India | Clay | Paige Hourigan | (India) Sowjanya Bavisetti (India) Riya Bhatia | W | 6–2, 6–0 |
| 2022 | G1 R/R | Apr 2022 | Antalya, Turkey | Indonesia | Clay | Paige Hourigan | (Indonesia) Jessy Rompies (Indonesia) Aldila Sutjiadi | W | 6–3, 4–6, 7–6^{(7–3)} |
