= Emily Fanning =

New Zealand tennis player (born 1995)

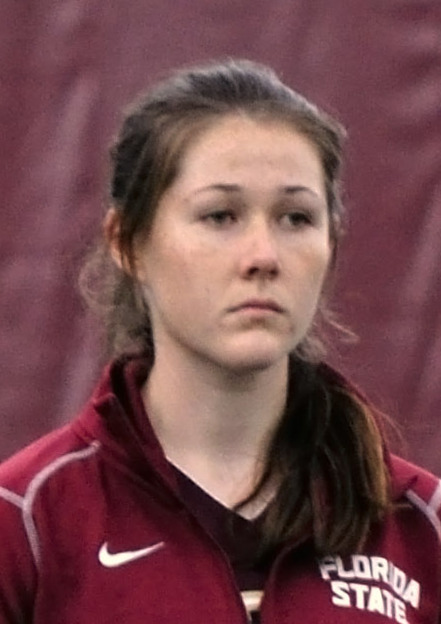
- Fanning at a Florida State Seminoles match in 2014
- Country (sports): New Zealand
- Born: 13 June 1995 (age 31) Timaru, New Zealand
- Retired: 5 December 2022
- Prize money: $18,402

Singles
- Career record: 60–54
- Career titles: 0
- Highest ranking: No. 539 (24 June 2019)

Grand Slam singles results
- Australian Open Junior: 1R (2011, 2012, 2013)
- French Open Junior: 2R (2011)
- Wimbledon Junior: 1R (2012)
- US Open Junior: 1R (2011, 2012)

Doubles
- Career record: 29–30
- Career titles: 3 ITF
- Highest ranking: No. 422 (9 March 2020)

Grand Slam doubles results
- Australian Open Junior: 1R (2011, 2012, 2013)
- French Open Junior: 2R (2012)
- Wimbledon Junior: 2R (2012)
- US Open Junior: 2R (2012)

Team competitions
- Fed Cup: 10–4 (singles 7–2)

Emily Fanning (born 13 June 1995) is a former tennis player from New Zealand. Her career-high junior ranking is 38, achieved in July 2012. In her career, Fanning won three doubles titles at tournaments of the ITF Women's Circuit.

== University studies ==
Fanning commenced studying Dietetics and Nutrition at Florida State University in 2014. She transferred to the University of Kentucky in 2017 to complete her degree, having played college tennis for both institutions.

== Tennis career ==
=== 2011 ===
Fanning made her WTA Tour debut when given a wildcard into the singles qualifying at the Auckland Open, where she lost in the first round to Katie O'Brien. She and fellow New Zealand junior Leela Beattie received a wildcard into the doubles, where they lost in the first round to Johanna Larsson and Jasmin Wöhr. She was voted New Zealand's Female Junior Player of the Year.

=== 2012 ===
Fanning received another wildcard into the Auckland Open in 2012, but again could not get past the first round, her conqueror this time being Anne Keothavong. She and Regina Kulikova were given wildcards into the doubles, going out in the first round to the top seeds, and eventual runners-up, Julia Görges and Flavia Pennetta. She played at all four junior Grand Slam events, losing in the first round of singles at each but reaching the second round of doubles at all except the Australian Open, and broke into the world's top 50 juniors.

Fanning scored her first ITF main-draw singles win at San Luis Potosí, Mexico, in August, where she and Anett Kontaveit won the doubles title, and reached her first quarterfinal at Bogotá the following month. She was again voted New Zealand's female junior player of the year, and was rewarded with a nomination to the New Zealand Fed Cup team for 2013.

=== 2013 ===
Fanning made her debut for New Zealand Fed Cup team in Astana, Kazakhstan, in February 2013. Playing singles only, she competed on all five days, losing only to Venise Chan from Hong Kong. Her win over in the 3rd-4th play-off would be her last open senior match for more than three years while she continued her university studies.

=== 2016 ===
Fanning resumed her ITF Circuit career at Evansville in July, losing in the second round of singles to Julia Elbaba. She also played a week later in Lexington, Kentucky, losing in the first round of both singles and doubles, but she then had another year away from the tour.

=== 2017 ===
Fanning returned to international play in Sharm El Sheikh, competing for five successive weeks from the start of July. Her best singles result was a quarterfinal loss to Linnéa Malmqvist in the last of those events, but she did better in doubles, reaching the semifinals of the last two tournaments. She was unfortunate to lose the last of those by default, as her partner, Mayar Sherif, had retired injured from her singles match earlier in the day.

=== 2018 ===
Fanning's first appointment in the New Year was with the New Zealand Fed Cup team in Bahrain. Playing doubles only, she and Jade Lewis beat the Lebanese pair before Fanning and Katherine Westbury lost to the top seeds Uzbekistan, but beat Pakistan in the 5th-8th play-off.

Fanning had a poor year on the ITF Circuit in 2018, qualifying for just two singles main draws. She had to retire injured after just three games of her second round match against Julia Glushko in Winnipeg in July, and lost in the first round in Lubbock, Texas in September to Camila Osorio. She also won only one main draw doubles match, at Naples in Florida, after having had to qualify.

=== 2019 ===
Fanning reached the second round of singles five times on the ITF Circuit in 2019. The highlight, although it didn't result in a win, was to share in the longest single game in recent history, a 39-minute marathon against Anastasia Gasanova in the second round in Incheon, Korea, at the end of May, with temperatures approaching 40 °C. The second game of the deciding set saw Fanning and Gasanova slugging it out for 28 minutes without a result. By now the game had gone for 31 points, with Fanning having the advantage, but a medical timeout was taken. They resumed seven minutes later and, after five more points and four more minutes, Gasanova finally broke Fanning at the eighth attempt. Fanning had had the advantage eight times as well, as they fought through 15 deuces.

Fanning would also be in the record books for sharing in one of the longest tie-breaks of all time, losing 17–15 in the first set decider against Angelina Gabueva in the second round of qualifying for the Lexington Challenger, at the end of July. In between those two events, Fanning played two singles matches when New Zealand played their 2019 Fed Cup matches in Kuala Lumpur, beating the representative from Bangladesh but losing to Hong Kong's Cody Wong.

Doubles was again Fanning's better discipline in 2019, as she reached two semifinals in Korea in May before taking her second tour title in Cairns in September with Abbie Myers as her partner, beating top seeds Maddison Inglis and Asia Muhammad in the final.

=== 2020 ===
Fanning started the new year with two tournaments in Hong Kong, where she failed to qualify for the main draw in singles but reached the quarterfinals in doubles in both events. From there it was back to New Zealand, where she played four matches in the Fed Cup tournament in Wellington. She won both singles matches and her first doubles, but she and Kelly Southwood lost their doubles play-off to the Philippines.

2020 saw the reintroduction of an ITF Circuit event in New Zealand, at Hamilton, and Fanning made it to the semifinals in singles before losing to Eri Shimizu. Seeded top in the doubles with partner Erin Routliffe, the New Zealand pair were untroubled throughout the tournament, easily winning the final over Sabastiani León and Ng Man-ying. Two tournaments in Perth, Australia were Fanning's last events before international play was suspended due to the COVID-19 pandemic. Her subsequent competitive tennis in 2020 was restricted to UTR tournaments in Florida, her best win being over world No. 179, Varvara Lepchenko, and she did not return to the professional tour.

=== 2022 ===
Fanning announced her retirement via Facebook on 5 December.

== ITF finals ==
=== Doubles: 3 (3 titles) ===
| Legend $25,000 tournaments (1–0) $15,000 tournaments (1–0) $10,000 tournaments (1–0) | Finals by surface Hard (3–0) Clay (0–0) Grass (0–0) |

| Outcome | No. | Date | Tournament | Surface | Partner | Opponents | Score |
|---|---|---|---|---|---|---|---|
| Winner | 1. | 20 August 2012 | San Luis Potosí, Mexico | Hard | (Estonia) Anett Kontaveit | (United States) Erin Clark (United States) Elizabeth Ferris | 6–0, 6–3 |
| Winner | 2. | 21 September 2019 | Cairns, Australia | Hard | (Australia) Abbie Myers | (Australia) Maddison Inglis (United States) Asia Muhammad | 2–6, 7–6^{(2)}, [10–7] |
| Winner | 3. | 15 February 2020 | Hamilton, New Zealand | Hard | (New Zealand) Erin Routliffe | (United States) Sabastiani León (Hong Kong) Maggie Ng | 6–3, 6–1 |

== Fed Cup participation ==
=== Singles (7–2) ===
| Edition | Stage | Date | Location | Against | Surface | Opponent | W/L | Score |
|---|---|---|---|---|---|---|---|---|
| 2013 Fed Cup; Asia/Oceania Zone Group II | R/R | 5 February 2013 | Astana, Kazakhstan | Vietnam | Hard (i) | (Vietnam) Trần Thị Tâm Hảo | W | 4–6, 7–6^{(7–2)}, 6–0 |
| 2013 Fed Cup; Asia/Oceania Zone Group II | R/R | 6 February 2013 | Astana, Kazakhstan | Hong Kong | Hard (i) | (Hong Kong) Venise Chan | L | 1–6, 6–3, 1–6 |
| 2013 Fed Cup; Asia/Oceania Zone Group II | R/R | 7 February 2013 | Astana, Kazakhstan | Turkmenistan | Hard (i) | (Turkmenistan) Jahana Bayramova | W | 6–0, 6–0 |
| 2013 Fed Cup; Asia/Oceania Zone Group II | R/R | 8 February 2013 | Astana, Kazakhstan | Singapore | Hard (i) | (Singapore) Rheeya Doshi | W | 6–1, 6–0 |
| 2013 Fed Cup; Asia/Oceania Zone Group II | P/O | 9 February 2013 | Astana, Kazakhstan | Philippines | Hard (i) | (Philippines) Marinel Rudas | W | 6–4, 6–3 |
| 2019 Fed Cup; Asia/Oceania Zone Group II | R/R | 19 June 2019 | Kuala Lumpur, Malaysia | Bangladesh | Hard | (Bangladesh) Jarin Sultana Jolly | W | 6–0, 6–0 |
| 2019 Fed Cup; Asia/Oceania Zone Group II | R/R | 21 June 2019 | Kuala Lumpur, Malaysia | Hong Kong | Hard | (Hong Kong) Cody Wong | L | 2–6, 3–6 |
| 2020 Fed Cup; Asia/Oceania Zone Group II | R/R | 5 February 2020 | Wellington, New Zealand | Mongolia | Hard | (Mongolia) Erdenesuren Erdenebat | W | 6–1, 6–0 |
| 2020 Fed Cup; Asia/Oceania Zone Group II | R/R | 6 February 2020 | Wellington, New Zealand | Pakistan | Hard | (Pakistan) Mahin Qureshi | W | 6–0, 6–2 |

=== Doubles (3–2) ===
| Edition | Stage | Date | Location | Against | Surface | Partner | Opponents | W/L | Score |
|---|---|---|---|---|---|---|---|---|---|
| 2018 Fed Cup; Asia/Oceania Zone Group II | R/R | 7 February 2018 | Bahrain | Lebanon | Hard | Jade Lewis | (Lebanon) Hoda Habib (Lebanon) Nancy Karaky | W | 6–1, 6–3 |
| 2018 Fed Cup; Asia/Oceania Zone Group II | R/R | 8 February 2018 | Bahrain | Uzbekistan | Hard | Katherine Westbury | (Uzbekistan) Akgul Amanmuradova (Uzbekistan) Yasmina Karimjanova | L | 5–7, 1–6 |
| 2018 Fed Cup; Asia/Oceania Zone Group II | P/O | 9 February 2018 | Bahrain | Pakistan | Hard | Katherine Westbury | (Pakistan) Sarah Mahboob Khan (Pakistan) Mahin Qureshi | W | 6–3, 6–1 |
| 2020 Fed Cup; Asia/Oceania Zone Group II | R/R | 7 February 2020 | Wellington, New Zealand | Singapore | Hard | Erin Routliffe | (Singapore) Sarah Pang (Singapore) Tammy Tan | W | 6–0, 6–0 |
| 2020 Fed Cup; Asia/Oceania Zone Group II | P/O | 8 February 2020 | Wellington, New Zealand | Philippines | Hard | Kelly Southwood | (Philippines) Marian Capadocia (Philippines) Shaira Hope Rivera | L | 3–6, 6–4, [9–11] |
