= 2018 Fed Cup Asia/Oceania Zone Group II – Pool D =

Subsection of tennis competition

Pool D of the 2018 Fed Cup Asia/Oceania Zone Group II was one of four pools in the Asia/Oceania zone of the 2018 Fed Cup. Four teams competed in a round robin competition, with the top team and the bottom team proceeding to their respective sections of the play-offs: the top team played for advancement to Group I.

== Standings ==
		INA	PAK	SRI	BRN	RR; W–L	Set; W–L	Game; W–L	Standings
4	Indonesia		3–0	3–0	3–0	3–0	18–0 (100%)	108–11 (91%)	1
10	Pakistan	0–3		2–1	3–0	2–1	11–7 (61%)	77–66 (54%)	2
7	Sri Lanka	0–3	1–2		3–0	1–2	7–11 (39%)	69–72 (49%)	3
12	Bahrain	0–3	0–3	0–3		0–3	0–18 (0%)	3–108 (3%)	4

Standings are determined by: 1. number of wins; 2. number of matches; 3. in two-team ties, head-to-head records; 4. in three-team ties, (a) percentage of sets won (head-to-head records if two teams remain tied), then (b) percentage of games won (head-to-head records if two teams remain tied), then (c) Fed Cup rankings.

== Round-robin ==
=== Indonesia vs. Bahrain ===
Indonesia
3
Bahrain Polytechnic, Isa Town, Bahrain
6 February
Hard

Bahrain
0

			1	2	3
1	(Indonesia) (Bahrain)	Aldila Sutjiadi; Safa Safar	6; 0	6; 0
2	(Indonesia) (Bahrain)	Beatrice Gumulya; Nazli Nader Redha	6; 0	6; 0
3	(Indonesia) (Bahrain)	Deria Nur Haliza / Jessy Rompies; Maya Bseisu / Nazli Nader Redha	6; 0	6; 0

=== Sri Lanka vs. Pakistan ===
Sri Lanka
1
Bahrain Polytechnic, Isa Town, Bahrain
6 February
Hard

Pakistan
2

			1	2	3
1	(Sri Lanka) (Pakistan)	Nethmi Himashi Waduge; Mahin Qureshi	3; 6	3; 6
2	(Sri Lanka) (Pakistan)	Anika Seneviratne; Ushna Suhail	6; 3	4; 6	6; 3
3	(Sri Lanka) (Pakistan)	Anika Seneviratne / Nethmi Himashi Waduge; Mahin Qureshi / Ushna Suhail	1; 6	4; 6

=== Indonesia vs. Pakistan ===
Indonesia
3
Bahrain Polytechnic, Isa Town, Bahrain
7 February
Hard

Pakistan
0

			1	2	3
1	(Indonesia) (Pakistan)	Aldila Sutjiadi; Sarah Mahboob Khan	6; 0	6; 2
2	(Indonesia) (Pakistan)	Beatrice Gumulya; Ushna Suhail	6; 2	6; 0
3	(Indonesia) (Pakistan)	Deria Nur Haliza / Jessy Rompies; Mahin Qureshi / Ushna Suhail	6; 1	6; 0

=== Sri Lanka vs. Bahrain ===
Sri Lanka
3
Bahrain Polytechnic, Isa Town, Bahrain
7 February
Hard

Bahrain
0

			1	2	3
1	(Sri Lanka) (Bahrain)	Savini Jayasuriya; Safa Safar	6; 0	6; 0
2	(Sri Lanka) (Bahrain)	Nethmi Himashi Waduge; Nazli Nader Redha	6; 0	6; 0
3	(Sri Lanka) (Bahrain)	Janali Manamperi / Anika Seneviratne; Nazli Nader Redha / Safa Safar	6; 0	6; 0

=== Indonesia vs. Sri Lanka ===
Indonesia
3
Bahrain Polytechnic, Isa Town, Bahrain
8 February
Hard

Sri Lanka
0

			1	2	3
1	(Indonesia) (Sri Lanka)	Aldila Sutjiadi; Nethmi Himashi Waduge	6; 0	6; 1
2	(Indonesia) (Sri Lanka)	Beatrice Gumulya; Anika Seneviratne	6; 1	6; 1
3	(Indonesia) (Sri Lanka)	Deria Nur Haliza / Jessy Rompies; Janali Manamperi / Anika Seneviratne	6; 0	6; 3

=== Pakistan vs. Bahrain ===
Pakistan
3
Bahrain Polytechnic, Isa Town, Bahrain
8 February
Hard

Bahrain
0

			1	2	3
1	(Pakistan) (Bahrain)	Sara Mansoor; Maya Bseisu	6; 1	6; 1
2	(Pakistan) (Bahrain)	Sarah Mahboob Khan; Nazli Nader Redha	6; 0	6; 1
3	(Pakistan) (Bahrain)	Sara Mansoor / Ushna Suhail; Faten Husain / Nazli Nader Redha	6; 0	6; 0
