= 2018 Fed Cup Asia/Oceania Zone Group II – Pool A =

Subsection of tennis competition

Pool A of the 2018 Fed Cup Asia/Oceania Zone Group II was one of four pools in the Asia/Oceania zone of the 2018 Fed Cup. Three teams competed in a round robin competition, with the top team and the bottom team proceeding to their respective sections of the play-offs: the top team played for advancement to Group I.

== Standings ==
| | | UZB | NZL | LBN | RR; W–L | Set; W–L | Game; W–L | Standings |
| 1 | Uzbekistan | | 3–0 | 3–0 | 2–0 | 12–0 (100%) | 75–28 (73%) | 1 |
| 8 | New Zealand | 0–3 | | 3–0 | 1–1 | 6–6 (50%) | 56–40 (58%) | 2 |
| 13 | Lebanon | 0–3 | 0–3 | | 0–2 | 0–12 (0%) | 12–72 (14%) | 2 |

Standings are determined by: 1. number of wins; 2. number of matches; 3. in two-team ties, head-to-head records; 4. in three-team ties, (a) percentage of sets won (head-to-head records if two teams remain tied), then (b) percentage of games won (head-to-head records if two teams remain tied), then (c) Fed Cup rankings.

== Round-robin ==
=== Uzbekistan vs. Lebanon ===
Uzbekistan
3
Bahrain Polytechnic, Isa Town, Bahrain
6 February
Hard

Lebanon
0

| | | | 1 | 2 | 3 |
|---|---|---|---|---|---|
| 1 | (Uzbekistan) (Lebanon) | Yasmina Karimjanova; Nancy Karaky | 6; 2 | 6; 0 |
| 2 | (Uzbekistan) (Lebanon) | Sabina Sharipova; Hoda Habib | 6; 0 | 6; 1 |
| 3 | (Uzbekistan) (Lebanon) | Nigina Abduraimova / Akgul Amanmuradova; Nancy Karaky / Sara Nassif | 6; 2 | 6; 3 |

=== New Zealand vs. Lebanon ===
New Zealand
3
Bahrain Polytechnic, Isa Town, Bahrain
7 February
Hard

Lebanon
0

| | | | 1 | 2 | 3 |
|---|---|---|---|---|---|
| 1 | (New Zealand) (Lebanon) | Katherine Westbury; Nancy Karaky | 6; 0 | 6; 0 |
| 2 | (New Zealand) (Lebanon) | Jade Lewis; Hoda Habib | 6; 0 | 6; 0 |
| 3 | (New Zealand) (Lebanon) | Emily Fanning / Jade Lewis; Hoda Habib / Nancy Karaky | 6; 1 | 6; 3 |

=== Uzbekistan vs. New Zealand ===
Uzbekistan
3
Bahrain Polytechnic, Isa Town, Bahrain
8 February
Hard

New Zealand
0

| | | | 1 | 2 | 3 |
|---|---|---|---|---|---|
| 1 | (Uzbekistan) (New Zealand) | Nigina Abduraimova; Jade Lewis | 7; 5 | 6; 3 |
| 2 | (Uzbekistan) (New Zealand) | Sabina Sharipova; Erin Routliffe | 7; 5 | 6; 1 |
| 3 | (Uzbekistan) (New Zealand) | Akgul Amanmuradova / Yasmina Karimjanova; Emily Fanning / Katherine Westbury | 7; 5 | 6; 1 |
