= 1993 Federation Cup Asia/Oceania Zone – play-offs =

The play-offs of the 1993 Federation Cup Asia/Oceania Zone were the final stages of the Zonal Competition involving teams from Asia and Oceania. Those that qualified for this stage placed first and second in their respective pools.

Placing	Pool A	Pool B	Pool C
1	Indonesia	China	New Zealand
2	Thailand	Chinese Taipei	Sri Lanka
3	Philippines	Singapore	Lebanon

The six teams were then randomly paired up to compete in three play-off ties, with the winners qualifying for the World Group.

== Indonesia vs. Singapore ==
Indonesia
3
National Tennis Centre, Colombo, Sri Lanka
5 May 1993
Clay (outdoors)

Singapore
0

			1	2	3
1	(Indonesia) (Singapore)	Joice-Riana Sutedja; Norzahara Zainal	6; 1	6; 0
2	(Indonesia) (Singapore)	Romana Tedjakusuma; Dionne Lim	6; 0	6; 0
3	(Indonesia) (Singapore)	Yayuk Basuki / Suzanna Anggarkusuma; Dionne Lim / Nozelina Lukeman	6; 0	6; 0

== China vs. Sri Lanka ==
China
3
National Tennis Centre, Colombo, Sri Lanka
5 May 1993
Clay (outdoors)

Sri Lanka
0

			1	2	3
1	(China) (Sri Lanka)	Yi Jing-Qian; Saranga Sangakkara	6; 2	6; 0
2	(China) (Sri Lanka)	Li Fang; Lihini Weerasuriya	6; 1	6; 0
3	(China) (Sri Lanka)	Bi Ying / Yi Jing-Qian; Anouschka Boralessa / Upeka Wijeratne	6; 0	6; 0

== New Zealand vs. Thailand ==
New Zealand
2
National Tennis Centre, Colombo, Sri Lanka
5 May 1993
Clay (outdoors)

Thailand
1

			1	2	3
1	(New Zealand) (Thailand)	Claudine Toleafoa; Tamarine Tanasugarn	6^{3} 7^{7}	6; 2	6; 3
2	(New Zealand) (Thailand)	Julie Richardson; Suvimol Duangchan	6; 1	6; 0
3	(New Zealand) (Thailand)	Julie Richardson / Paiao-Asinata Short; Suvimol Duangchan / Benjamas Sangaram	7; 5	3; 6	6; 8

- Indonesia, China and New Zealand advanced to the World Group. Indonesia and China defeated Poland, 2–1, and Peru, 2–1, respectively in the first round, but New Zealand was defeated in the same round by Argentina, 3–0. Indonesia and China, however, were subsequently defeated in the second round by Spain, 3–0, and United States, 2–1.

== See also ==
- Fed Cup structure
