= Jade Lewis =

New Zealand tennis player (born 1998)

- Country (sports): New Zealand
- Residence: Hilton Head Island, South Carolina, United States
- Born: 18 December 1998 (age 27) Auckland, New Zealand
- Height: 1.70 m (5 ft 7 in)
- Plays: Right-handed (two-handed backhand)
- Coach: David Lewis
- Prize money: $13,079

Singles
- Career record: 41–44
- Career titles: 0
- Highest ranking: No. 1012 (30 April 2018)

Doubles
- Career record: 19–19
- Career titles: 2 ITF
- Highest ranking: No. 705 (21 May 2018)

Team competitions
- Fed Cup: 3–1 (singles 2–1)

Jade Lewis (born 18 December 1998) is a former tennis player from New Zealand. She comes from a family of achievers in the sport. One uncle is 1983 Wimbledon Championships finalist Chris Lewis, and her father David and other uncle Mark competed for New Zealand's Davis Cup team. Her older sister Carolina, who died suddenly in September 2019, played tennis for West Virginia University and also competed in a handful of ITF tournaments.

Lewis achieved a career-high junior ranking of world No. 59 in January 2016.

== Tennis career ==
=== 2017 ===
In December 2016, Lewis was awarded a wildcard for the 2017 ASB Classic. In the first round, she played former world No. 1, Venus Williams, losing 6–7, 2–6.

=== 2018 ===
A year later, she received wildcards for the main draw of both singles and doubles at the 2018 ASB Classic. In the singles, she was beaten by Slovakian qualifier Viktória Kužmová, 6–4, 6–3, and in the doubles, she and Hsieh Shu-ying were beaten by second seeds, Nao Hibino and Darija Jurak, 6–1, 6–0.

She then traveled to Egypt for a series of ITF tournaments at Sharm El Sheikh. In the first of these, she qualified for the main draw in singles, but lost in the first round. However, in the doubles, she and Erin Routliffe reached the final where they beat the top seeds Anastasia Potapova and Ekaterina Yashina. It was Lewis's first ITF title. A week later, in the next tournament of the series, they repeated their success, again against the top seeds (although a different pair of opponents).

Lewis then joined the New Zealand team in Bahrain for their Fed Cup Asia/Oceania Group II playoffs. New Zealand started against Lebanon, with Lewis dispatching Hoda Habib 6–0, 6–0 in the second rubber of the tie. She and Emily Fanning in the doubles then beat Habib and Nancy Karaky, 6–1, 6–3. The following day, New Zealand met top seeds Uzbekistan, and Lewis was beaten 7–5, 6–3, by Nigina Abduraimova in the first singles rubber. Losing all three rubbers, New Zealand therefore finished second in the group, and moved through to the 5th–8th place play-offs against Pakistan the following day, where Lewis beat Mahin Qureshi, 6–1, 6–0. The tie was won 3–0, New Zealand therefore finishing 5th equal with the Philippines.

In April 2018 it was reported that Lewis would take a break from tennis touring, and resuming full-time study at Louisiana State University (LSU) in Baton Rouge. She made a return to the circuit in June when an ITF tournament was played at the university, losing in the final round of qualifying for singles, and in the first round of doubles, but has not played any tour matches since then.

== ITF Circuit finals ==
=== Doubles: 2 (2 titles) ===
Legend
$25,000 tournaments
$15,000 tournaments

Result	Date	Tournament	Tier	Surface	Partner	Opponents	Score
Win	20 January 2018	ITF Sharm El Sheikh, Egypt	15,000	Hard	(New Zealand) Erin Routliffe	(Russia) Anastasia Potapova (Russia) Ekaterina Yashina	0–6, 7–5, [10–6]
Win	27 January 2018	ITF Sharm El Sheikh, Egypt	15,000	Hard	(New Zealand) Erin Routliffe	(Turkey) Berfu Cengiz (Bosnia and Herzegovina) Jasmina Tinjić	6–1, 5–7, [12–10]
