= 1993 Federation Cup Asia/Oceania Zone – Pool C =

Group C of the 1993 Federation Cup Asia/Oceania Zone was one of three pools in the Asia/Oceania zone of the 1993 Federation Cup. Three teams competed in a round robin competition, with the top two teams advancing to the play-offs.

	(New Zealand) NZL	(Sri Lanka) SRI	(Lebanon) LIB	RR; W–L	Set; W–L	Game; W–L	Standings
New Zealand		2–1	2–0	2–0	10–2	54–2	1
Sri Lanka	1–2		3–0	1–1	8–4	52–35	2
Lebanon	0–2	0–3		0–2	0–10	7–60	3

== Sri Lanka vs. Lebanon ==
Sri Lanka
3
National Tennis Centre, Colombo, Sri Lanka
3 May 1993
Clay (outdoors)

Lebanon
0

			1	2	3
1	(Sri Lanka) (Lebanon)	Saranga Sangakkara; Tania Zaitouni	6; 1	6; 1
2	(Sri Lanka) (Lebanon)	Lihini Weerasuriya; Maya Hajjar	6; 1	6; 1
3	(Sri Lanka) (Lebanon)	Saranga Sangakkara / Lihini Weerasuriya; Maya Hajjar / Tania Zaitouni	6; 0	6; 1

== New Zealand vs. Lebanon ==
New Zealand
2
National Tennis Centre, Colombo, Sri Lanka
4 May 1993
Clay (outdoors)

Lebanon
0

			1	2	3
1	(New Zealand) (Lebanon)	Claudine Toleafoa; Nahia Abou-Khalil	6; 0	6; 1
2	(New Zealand) (Lebanon)	Julie Richardson; Maya Hajjar	6; 1	6; 0
3	(New Zealand) (Lebanon)					not played

== New Zealand vs. Sri Lanka ==
New Zealand
2
National Tennis Centre, Colombo, Sri Lanka
4 May 1993
Clay (outdoors)

Sri Lanka
1

			1	2	3
1	(New Zealand) (Sri Lanka)	Claudine Toleafoa; Saranga Sangakkara	6; 1	6; 2
2	(New Zealand) (Sri Lanka)	Julie Richardson; Lihini Weerasuriya	6^{4} 7^{7}	0; 6
3	(New Zealand) (Sri Lanka)	Julie Richardson / Claudine Toleafoa; Saranga Sangakkara / Lihini Weerasuriya	6; 4	6; 2

== See also ==
- Fed Cup structure
