= Sarah Mahboob Khan =

Pakistani tennis player (born 1991)

- Country (sports): Pakistan
- Born: 9 February 1991 (age 35) Rawalpindi, Pakistan
- Plays: Right-handed (Double-handed backhand)
- College: James Madison University
- Prize money: US$ 687

Singles
- Career record: 2 - 4
- Career titles: 0

Doubles
- Career record: 2 - 4

Sarah Mahboob Khan (born 9 February 1991) is a Pakistani tennis player.

Playing for Pakistan at the Fed Cup, Mahboob Khan has a win–loss of 2–8.

== Career ==
Sarah Mahboob Khan was born in Rawalpindi, Pakistan. Her father Mahboob is a tennis coach. In 2004, Sarah Mahboob Khan became the youngest ever Pakistan National Champion, aged 14.

She has been Pakistan's leading tennis player since 2005. She is the only player to have won Pakistan national titles on clay, hard, and grass, and has won a record number of National Rankings Ladies' Singles Titles.

In October 2010, Sarah Mahboob Khan became the first Pakistani female tennis player to qualify for the main draw of an ITF tournament outside Pakistan, and the first to reach the quarter-final of an ITF tournament, achieving this in the doubles at Ain Sukhna, Egypt, partnering Irina Constantinide.

In May 2011, she signed to play for the tennis team of the University of New Mexico.

After her sophomore year, Khan transferred to play for James Madison University in Virginia, where she played for four years and graduated in May 2015. She then returned to Pakistan.

== Fed Cup participation ==
=== Singles ===
Outcome	No.	Date	Edition	Surface	Against	Opponent	Score
Runner-up	1.	February 2011	2011 Fed Cup; Asia/Oceania Zone II	Hard	Kyrgyzstan	(Kyrgyzstan) Zhamilia Duisheeva	0–6, 4–6
Runner-up	2.	February 2011	2011 Fed Cup; Asia/Oceania Zone II	Hard	Indonesia	(Indonesia) Lavinia Tananta	0–6, 1–6
Runner-up	3.	February 2011	2011 Fed Cup; Asia/Oceania Zone II	Hard	Philippines	(Philippines) Anna Clarice Patrimonio	4–6, 0–6
Runner-up	4.	February 2011	2011 Fed Cup; Asia/Oceania Zone II	Hard	Turkmenistan	(Turkmenistan) Anastasiya Prenko	1–6, 1–6
Runner-up	5.	April 2016	2016 Fed Cup; Asia/Oceania Zone II	Hard	Singapore	(Singapore) Charmaine Shi Yi Seah	1–6, 2–6
Runner-up	6.	April 2016	2016 Fed Cup; Asia/Oceania Zone II	Hard	Indonesia	(Indonesia) Jessy Rompies	1–6, 1–6
Winner	7.	April 2016	2016 Fed Cup; Asia/Oceania Zone II	Hard	Bahrain	(Bahrain) Nazli Nader Redha	6–0, 6–0
Runner-up	8.	July 2017	2017 Fed Cup; Asia/Oceania Zone II	Hard	Malaysia	(Malaysia) Aslina Chua	6–7, 5–7
Runner-up	9.	February 2018	2018 Fed Cup; Asia/Oceania Zone II	Hard	Indonesia	(Indonesia) Aldila Sutjiadi	0–6, 2–6
Winner	10.	February 2018	2018 Fed Cup; Asia/Oceania Zone II	Hard	Bahrain	(Bahrain) Nazli Nader Redha	6–0, 6–1
Runner-up	11.	June 2019	2018 Fed Cup; Asia/Oceania Zone II	Hard	Hong Kong	(Hong Kong) Eudice Chong	0–6, 1–6
Runner-up	12.	June 2019	2018 Fed Cup; Asia/Oceania Zone II	Hard	New Zealand	(New Zealand) Paige Hourigan	0–6, 0–6
Winner	13.	June 2019	2018 Fed Cup; Asia/Oceania Zone II	Hard	Bangladesh	(Bangladesh) Eshita Afrose	6–1, 6–2
Runner-up	14.	June 2019	2018 Fed Cup; Asia/Oceania Zone II	Hard	Turkmenistan	(Turkmenistan) Guljan Muhammetkuliyeva	2–6, 1–6
Runner-up	15.	February 2020	2020 Fed Cup; Asia/Oceania Zone II	Hard	Singapore	(Singapore) Izabella Tan Hui-xin	2–6, 1–6
Runner-up	16.	February 2020	2020 Fed Cup; Asia/Oceania Zone II	Hard	New Zealand	(New Zealand) Paige Hourigan	2–6, 0–6

=== Doubles ===
Outcome	No.	Date	Edition	Surface	Against	Partner	Opponents	Score
Winner	1.	February 2011	2011 Fed Cup; Asia/Oceania Zone II	Hard	Kyrgyzstan	(Pakistan) Ushna Suhail	(Kyrgyzstan) Zhamilia Duisheeva (Kyrgyzstan) Emilia Tenizbaeva	6–4, 6–2
Runner-up	2.	February 2011	2011 Fed Cup; Asia/Oceania Zone II	Hard	Turkmenistan	(Pakistan) Ushna Suhail	(Turkmenistan) Jenneta Halliyeva (Turkmenistan) Anastasiya Prenko	2–6, 2–6
Runner-up	3.	April 2016	2016 Fed Cup; Asia/Oceania Zone II	Hard	Malaysia	(Pakistan) Ushna Suhail	(Malaysia) Jawairiah Noordin (Malaysia) Theiviya Selvarajoo	3–6, 0–6
Winner	4.	April 2016	2016 Fed Cup; Asia/Oceania Zone II	Hard	Kyrgyzstan	(Pakistan) Ushna Suhail	(Kyrgyzstan) Nelli Buyuklianova (Kyrgyzstan) Alina Lazareva	w/o
Runner-up	5.	July 2017	2017 Fed Cup; Asia/Oceania Zone II	Hard	Malaysia	(Pakistan) Mahin Qureshi	(Malaysia) Aslina Chua (Malaysia) Uma Nayar	3-6, 2-6
Winner	6.	July 2017	2017 Fed Cup; Asia/Oceania Zone II	Hard	Iran	(Pakistan) Ushna Suhail	(Iran) Sara Amiri (Iran) Ghazal Pakbaten	6–3, 7–5
Runner-up	7.	February 2018	2018 Fed Cup; Asia/Oceania Zone II	Hard	New Zealand	(Pakistan) Mahin Qureshi	(New Zealand) Emily Fanning (New Zealand) Katherine Westbury	3-6, 1-6
Runner-up	8.	June 2019	2019 Fed Cup; Asia/Oceania Zone II	Hard	Hong Kong	(Pakistan) Meheq Khokhar	(Hong Kong) Ng Kwan-yau (Hong Kong) Cody Wong	0–6, 1–6
Runner-up	9.	June 2019	2019 Fed Cup; Asia/Oceania Zone II	Hard	Turkmenistan	(Pakistan) Sara Mansoor	(Turkmenistan) Anastasiya Azimbayeva (Turkmenistan) Guljan Muhammetkuliyeva	4–6, 5–7
