= Ayan Broomfield =

Canadian tennis player (born 1997)

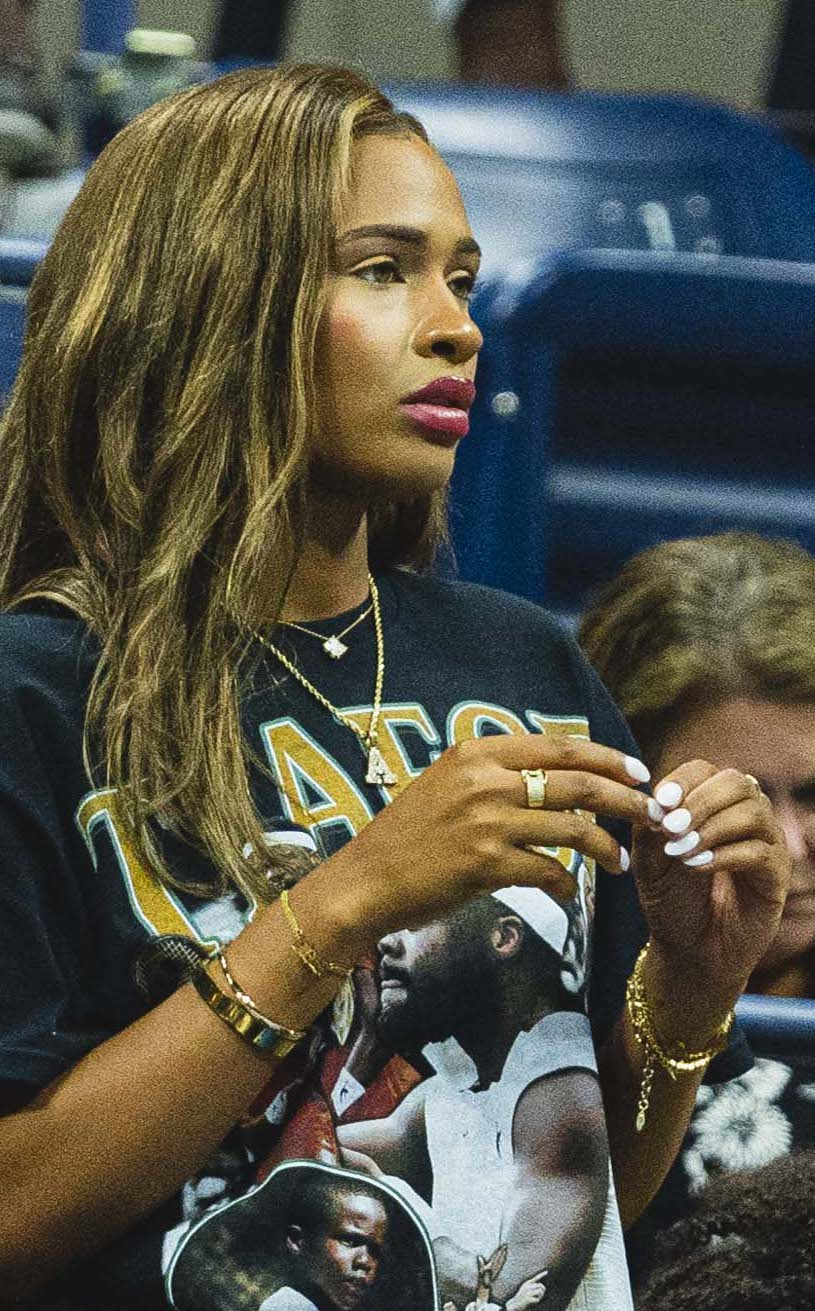
- Broomfield spectating at 2022 US Open
- Country (sports): Canada
- Born: 13 August 1997 (age 29) Toronto, Ontario, Canada
- Height: 1.70 m (5 ft 7 in)
- Plays: Right-handed (two-handed backhand)
- College: Clemson Tigers; UCLA Bruins
- Prize money: US$10,057

Singles
- Career record: 35–37
- Career titles: 0 WTA, 0 ITF
- Highest ranking: No. 680 (April 27, 2015)

Doubles
- Career record: 15–20
- Career titles: 0 WTA, 2 ITF
- Highest ranking: No. 467 (May 4, 2015)
Medal record
Women's tennis
Representing Ontario
Canada Summer Games
Gold medal – first place	2013 Sherbrooke	Doubles
- Last updated on: November 20, 2017.

Ayan Broomfield is a Canadian tennis player.

== Early life and education ==
Ayan Broomfield was born in Toronto, Ontario Canada on August 13, 1997.

She was a member of the Clemson Tigers and UCLA Bruins college athletic teams.

== Career ==
Broomfield has won two doubles titles on the ITF tour in her career. On April 27, 2015, she reached her best singles ranking of world number 680. On May 4, 2015, she peaked at world number 467 in the doubles rankings.

Broomfield made her WTA Tour debut at the 2014 Coupe Banque Nationale, having received a wildcard with Maria Patrascu into the doubles tournament. She decided to follow the college route and was part of the Clemson University tennis team from January 2016 to May 2017.

On May 25, 2019, playing for the UCLA Bruins, she and teammate Gabby Andrews won the doubles event at the 2019 NCAA Division I Women's Tennis Championship, defeating Kate Fahey and Brienne Minor of the Michigan Wolverines.

== In film ==
A short documentary titled Ayan Broomfield Tennis Story premiered on Amazon Prime Video on July 22, 2019.

Broomfield was body double for select scenes of Venus Williams matches on the 2021 biographical film King Richard.

== Personal life ==
Her partner is men's tennis player Frances Tiafoe.

== ITF Circuit finals ==
=== Doubles: 2 (2 titles) ===
Legend
$100,000 tournaments (0–0)
$75,000 / $80,000 tournaments (0–0)
$50,000 / $60,000 tournaments (0–0)
$25,000 tournaments (0–0)
$10,000 / $15,000 tournaments (2–0)

Result	W–L	Date	Tournament	Tier	Surface	Partner	Opponents	Score
Win	1–0	Jun 2014	Victoria, Canada	10,000	Hard (i)	(Canada) Maria Patrascu	(Canada) Khristina Blajkevitch (Canada) Wendy Qi-wen Zhang	5–7, 6–4, [10–8]
Win	2–0	Feb 2015	Petit-Bourg, France	10,000	Hard	(Canada) Marie-Alexandre Leduc	(Bolivia) María Fernanda Álvarez (Brazil) Laura Pigossi	2–6, 6–4, [10–8]
