= 2018 Fed Cup Asia/Oceania Zone Group II – Pool C =

Subsection of tennis competition

Pool C of the 2018 Fed Cup Asia/Oceania Zone Group II was one of four pools in the Asia/Oceania zone of the 2018 Fed Cup. Four teams competed in a round robin competition, with the top team and the bottom team proceeding to their respective sections of the play-offs the top team played for advancement to Group I.

== Standings ==
		POC	OMA	MAS	IRI	RR; W–L	Set; W–L	Game; W–L	Standings
6	Pacific Oceania		3–0	3–0	3–0	3–0	18–0 (100%)	112–34 (77%)	1
14	Oman	0–3		2–1	2–1	2–1	9–11 (45%)	84–92 (48%)	2
3	Malaysia	0–3	1–2		3–0	1–2	9–10 (47%)	91–80 (53%)	3
9	Iran	0–3	1–2	0–3		0–3	2–17 (11%)	28–109 (20%)	4

Standings are determined by: 1. number of wins; 2. number of matches; 3. in two-team ties, head-to-head records; 4. in three-team ties, (a) percentage of sets won (head-to-head records if two teams remain tied), then (b) percentage of games won (head-to-head records if two teams remain tied), then (c) Fed Cup rankings.

== Round-robin ==
=== Malaysia vs. Oman ===
Malaysia
1
Bahrain Polytechnic, Isa Town, Bahrain
6 February
Hard

Oman
2

			1	2	3
1	(Malaysia) (Oman)	Theiviya Selvarajoo; Sarah Al Balushi	6; 1	6; 2
2	(Malaysia) (Oman)	Suhana Sofia Mohd Adam Das; Fatma Al-Nabhani	2; 6	5; 7
3	(Malaysia) (Oman)	Jawairiah Noordin / Theiviya Selvarajoo; Sarah Al Balushi / Fatma Al-Nabhani	4; 6	7^{7} 6^{4}	5; 7

=== Pacific Oceania vs. Iran ===
Pacific Oceania
3
Bahrain Polytechnic, Isa Town, Bahrain
6 February
Hard

Iran
0

			1	2	3
1	(Pacific Oceania) (Iran)	Steffi Carruthers; Sara Azaddoost	6; 1	6; 0
2	(Pacific Oceania) (Iran)	Carol Young Suh Lee; Kimiya Asbaghipour	6; 1	6; 0
3	(Pacific Oceania) (Iran)	Steffi Carruthers / Abigail Tere-Apisah; Shahrzad Banisaeid / Kimia Rahmani	6; 0	6; 0

=== Malaysia vs. Iran ===
Malaysia
3
Bahrain Polytechnic, Isa Town, Bahrain
7 February
Hard

Iran
0

			1	2	3
1	(Malaysia) (Iran)	Theiviya Selvarajoo; Shahrzad Banisaeid	6; 4	6; 0
2	(Malaysia) (Iran)	Suhana Sofia Mohd Adam Das; Kimia Rahmani	6; 2	6; 1
3	(Malaysia) (Iran)	Jawairiah Noordin / Suhana Sofia Mohd Adam Das; Sara Azaddoost / Kimia Rahmani	6; 0	6; 0

=== Pacific Oceania vs. Oman ===
Pacific Oceania
3
Bahrain Polytechnic, Isa Town, Bahrain
7 February
Hard

Oman
0

			1	2	3
1	(Pacific Oceania) (Oman)	Carol Young Suh Lee; Maryam Al Balushi	6; 0	6; 0
2	(Pacific Oceania) (Oman)	Abigail Tere-Apisah; Fatma Al-Nabhani	7^{7} 6^{4}	7; 5
3	(Pacific Oceania) (Oman)	Steffi Carruthers / Abigail Tere-Apisah; Maryam Al Balushi / Aisha Al Suleimani	6; 0	6; 1

=== Malaysia vs. Pacific Oceania ===
Malaysia
0
Bahrain Polytechnic, Isa Town, Bahrain
8 February
Hard

Pacific Oceania
3

			1	2	3
1	(Malaysia) (Pacific Oceania)	Theiviya Selvarajoo; Steffi Carruthers	6^{6} 7^{8}	6^{5} 7^{7}
2	(Malaysia) (Pacific Oceania)	Suhana Sofia Mohd Adam Das; Abigail Tere-Apisah	2; 6	0; 6
3	(Malaysia) (Pacific Oceania)	Jawairiah Noordin / Suhana Sofia Mohd Adam Das; Steffi Carruthers / Abigail Tere-Apisah	4; 6	2; 6

=== Iran vs. Oman ===
Iran
1
Bahrain Polytechnic, Isa Town, Bahrain
8 February
Hard

Oman
2

			1	2	3
1	(Iran) (Oman)	Shahrzad Banisaeid; Sarah Al Balushi	2; 6	7^{7} 6^{2}	6; 1
2	(Iran) (Oman)	Kimiya Asbaghipour; Fatma Al-Nabhani	0; 6	1; 6
3	(Iran) (Oman)	Sara Azaddoost / Shahrzad Banisaeid; Sarah Al Balushi / Fatma Al-Nabhani	2; 6	1; 6
