= 2018 Fed Cup Asia/Oceania Zone Group II – Pool B =

Subsection of tennis competition

Pool B of the 2018 Fed Cup Asia/Oceania Zone Group II was one of four pools in the Asia/Oceania zone of the 2018 Fed Cup. Three teams competed in a round robin competition, with the top team and the bottom team proceeding to their respective sections of the play-offs: the top team played for advancement to Group I.

== Standings ==
		SGP	PHI	KGZ	RR; W–L	Set; W–L	Game; W–L	Standings
5	Singapore		2–1	2–1	2–0	8–5 (62%)	60–49 (55%)	1
2	Philippines	1–2		2–1	1–1	8–6 (57%)	67–59 (53%)	2
11	Kyrgyzstan	1–2	1–2		0–2	4–7 (36%)	49–68 (42%)	3

Standings are determined by: 1. number of wins; 2. number of matches; 3. in two-team ties, head-to-head records; 4. in three-team ties, (a) percentage of sets won (head-to-head records if two teams remain tied), then (b) percentage of games won (head-to-head records if two teams remain tied), then (c) Fed Cup rankings.

== Round-robin ==
=== Philippines vs. Kyrgyzstan ===
Philippines
2
Bahrain Polytechnic, Isa Town, Bahrain
6 February
Hard

Kyrgyzstan
1

			1	2	3
1	(Philippines) (Kyrgyzstan)	Marian Capadocia; Saara Kunakunova	6; 1	6; 2
2	(Philippines) (Kyrgyzstan)	Katharina Lehnert; Ksenia Palkina	5; 7	6; 3	5; 7
3	(Philippines) (Kyrgyzstan)	Katharina Lehnert / Anna Clarice Patrimonio; Kanykey Koichumanova / Ksenia Palkina	6; 4	6; 3

=== Singapore vs. Kyrgyzstan ===
Singapore
2
Bahrain Polytechnic, Isa Town, Bahrain
7 February
Hard

Kyrgyzstan
1

			1	2	3
1	(Singapore) (Kyrgyzstan)	Charmaine Shi Yi Seah; Saara Kunakunova	6; 2	6; 4
2	(Singapore) (Kyrgyzstan)	Stefanie Tan; Ksenia Palkina	6; 1	6; 3
3	(Singapore) (Kyrgyzstan)	Lynelle En Tong Lim / Tammy Tan; Kanykey Koichumanova / Ksenia Palkina	1; 6	3; 6

=== Philippines vs. Singapore ===
Philippines
1
Bahrain Polytechnic, Isa Town, Bahrain
8 February
Hard

Singapore
2

			1	2	3
1	(Philippines) (Singapore)	Anna Clarice Patrimonio; Charmaine Shi Yi Seah	3; 6	7^{7} 6^{2}	1; 6
2	(Philippines) (Singapore)	Katharina Lehnert; Stefanie Tan	2; 6	2; 6
3	(Philippines) (Singapore)	Marian Capadocia / Khim Iglupas; Lynelle En Tong Lim / Tammy Tan	6; 1	6; 1
