= Tennis at the 2013 Canada Summer Games =

Tennis at the 2013 Canada Summer Games was in Sherbrooke, Quebec at the Centre récréatif Rock Forest. It was held from the 3 to 7 August.

== Medal table ==
The following is the medal table for rowing at the 2013 Canada Summer Games.

* Host nation ( Quebec)

Rank	Nation	Gold	Silver	Bronze	Total
1	Ontario	3	1	0	4
2	British Columbia	1	4	0	5
3	Alberta	1	0	2	3
4	Quebec*	0	0	3	3
Totals (4 entries)		5	5	5	15

== Results ==
Event	Gold	Silver	Bronze
Men's singles	Harrison Scott; Alberta	Alexander Day; British Columbia	Hugo Di Feo; Quebec
Men's doubles	British Columbia; Felix Fan; Patrick Hall	Ontario; Dylan Bednarczyk; Jesse Flores	Alberta; Matt LaBarre; Sidney Yap
Women's singles	Erin Routliffe; Ontario	Alexis Prokopuik; British Columbia	Marie-Alexandre Leduc; Quebec
Women's doubles	Ontario; Ayan Broomfield; Maria Patrascu	British Columbia; Stacey Fung; Daniella Silva	Alberta; Claire Koke; Ally Miller
Mixed team	Ontario	British Columbia	Quebec
