= 1993 Federation Cup Asia/Oceania Zone – Pool B =

Group B of the 1993 Federation Cup Asia/Oceania Zone was one of three pools in the Asia/Oceania zone of the 1993 Federation Cup. Three teams competed in a round robin competition, with the top two teams advancing to the play-offs.

	(China) CHN	(Chinese Taipei) TPE	(Singapore) SIN	RR; W–L	Set; W–L	Game; W–L	Standings
China		2–1	2–0	2–0	9–2	64–29	1
Chinese Taipei	1–2		3–0	1–1	8–5	64–47	2
Singapore	0–2	0–3		0–2	0–6	8–60	3

== Chinese Taipei vs. Singapore ==
Chinese Taipei
3
National Tennis Centre, Colombo, Sri Lanka
3 May 1993
Clay (outdoors)

Singapore
0

			1	2	3
1	(Chinese Taipei) (Singapore)	Liu Yu-hsien; Norzahara Zainal	6; 2	6; 0
2	(Chinese Taipei) (Singapore)	Ho Chiu-mei; Dionne Lim	6; 2	6; 1
3	(Chinese Taipei) (Singapore)	Ho Chiu-mei / Liu Yu-hsien; Nozelina Lukeman / Norzahara Zainal	6; 1	6; 1

== China vs. Chinese Taipei ==
China
2
National Tennis Centre, Colombo, Sri Lanka
4 May 1993
Clay (outdoors)

Chinese Taipei
1

			1	2	3
1	(China) (Chinese Taipei)	Chen Li-Ling; Liu Yu-hsien	6; 4	6; 4
2	(China) (Chinese Taipei)	Li Fang; Ho Chiu-mei	6; 1	6; 3
3	(China) (Chinese Taipei)	Bi Ying / Yi Jing-Qian; Ho Chiu-mei / Liu Yu-hsien	6; 2	5; 7	5; 7

== China vs. Singapore ==
China
2
National Tennis Centre, Colombo, Sri Lanka
4 May 1993
Clay (outdoors)

Singapore
0

			1	2	3
1	(China) (Singapore)	Yi Jing-Qian; Norzahara Zainal	6; 1	6; 0
2	(China) (Singapore)	Li Fang; Dionne Lim	6; 0	6; 0
3	(China) (Singapore)					not played

== See also ==
- Fed Cup structure
