= 1993 Federation Cup Asia/Oceania Zone – Pool A =

Group A of the 1993 Federation Cup Asia/Oceania Zone was one of three pools in the Asia/Oceania zone of the 1993 Federation Cup. Three teams competed in a round robin competition, with the top two teams advancing to the play-offs.

	(Indonesia) INA	(Thailand) THA	(Philippines) PHI	RR; W–L	Set; W–L	Game; W–L	Standings
Indonesia		2–0	3–0	2–0	10–1	64–24	1
Thailand	0–2		2–1	1–1	5–7	46–59	2
Philippines	0–3	1–2		0–2	4–15	55–82	3

== Thailand vs. Philippines ==
Thailand
2
National Tennis Centre, Colombo, Sri Lanka
3 May 1993
Clay (outdoors)

Philippines
1

			1	2	3
1	(Thailand) (Philippines)	Tamarine Tanasugarn; Jean Lozano	6; 2	7^{7} 6^{5}
2	(Thailand) (Philippines)	Suvimol Duangchan; Evangelina Olivarez	4; 6	7; 5	2; 6
3	(Thailand) (Philippines)	Suvimol Duangchan / Benjamas Sangaram; Francesca La'O / Jean Lozano	4; 6	6; 4	6; 0

== Indonesia vs. Thailand ==
Indonesia
2
National Tennis Centre, Colombo, Sri Lanka
4 May 1993
Clay (outdoors)

Thailand
0

			1	2	3
1	(Indonesia) (Thailand)	Romana Tedjakusuma; Tamarine Tanasugarn	6; 0	6; 3
2	(Indonesia) (Thailand)	Yayuk Basuki; Suvimol Duangchan	6; 1	6; 0
3	(Indonesia) (Thailand)					not played

== Indonesia vs. Philippines ==
Indonesia
3
National Tennis Centre, Colombo, Sri Lanka
4 May 1993
Clay (outdoors)

Philippines
0

			1	2	3
1	(Indonesia) (Philippines)	Romana Tedjakusuma; Francesca La'O	6; 0	6; 1
2	(Indonesia) (Philippines)	Yayuk Basuki; Evangelina Olivarez	6; 1	6; 4
3	(Indonesia) (Philippines)	Joice-Riana Sutedja / Suzanna Anggarkusuma; Jean Lozano / Evangelina Olivarez	6; 2	2; 6	8; 6

== See also ==
- Fed Cup structure
