= 2018 Fed Cup =

International women's tennis competition

Details
- Duration: 6 February – 11 November
- Edition: 56th

Achievements (singles)

The 2018 Fed Cup was the 56th edition of the most important tournament between national teams in women's tennis. The 2018 Fed Cup was expected to feature some structural changes, including a 16-team World Group and the introduction of a Final Four event at a neutral, predetermined location. However, the ITF announced shortly before their annual meeting that they were tabling a vote on the changes for at least one year.

In one of the biggest shocks in the tournament history, Russia was demoted to the Zonal Groups for the first time in two decades, after consecutive losses to Slovakia and Latvia.

The final took place on 10–11 November and was won by the Czech Republic.

Uganda made its first appearance in the tournament.

== World Group ==
Participating teams
Belarus	Belgium	Czech Republic	France
Germany	Netherlands	Switzerland	United States

=== Seeds ===
1. Belarus (quarterfinals)
2. United States (final)
3. Czech Republic (champions)
4. France (semifinals)

=== Draw ===
Quarterfinals; 10–11 February
Minsk, Belarus (hard, indoor)
1	Belarus	2
Germany	3
Prague, Czech Republic (hard, indoor)
3	Czech Republic	3
Switzerland	1
La Roche-sur-Yon, France (hard, indoor)
Belgium	2
4	France	3
Asheville, United States (hard, indoor)
Netherlands	1
2	United States	3

Semifinals; 21–22 April
Stuttgart, Germany (clay, indoor)
Germany	1
3	Czech Republic	4
Aix-en-Provence, France (clay, indoor)
4	France	2
2	United States	3

Final; 10–11 November
Prague, Czech Republic (hard, indoor)
3	Czech Republic	3
2	United States	0

== World Group play-offs ==
The four losing teams in the World Group first round ties and four winners of the World Group II ties will compete in the World Group play-offs for spots in the 2019 World Group.

Participating teams
Australia	Belarus	Belgium	Italy
Netherlands	Romania	Slovakia	Switzerland

=== Seeds ===
1. Belarus
2. Switzerland
3. Netherlands
4. Belgium

Venue	Surface	Home team	Score	Visiting team
Minsk, Belarus	Hard (i)	Belarus	3–2	Slovakia
Cluj-Napoca, Romania	Clay (i)	Romania	3–1	Switzerland
Wollongong, Australia	Hard (i)	Australia	4–1	Netherlands
Genoa, Italy	Clay	Italy	0–4	Belgium

== World Group II ==
Participating teams
Australia	Canada	Italy	Romania
Russia	Slovakia	Spain	Ukraine

=== Seeds ===
1. Russia
2. Italy
3. Ukraine
4. Romania

Venue	Surface	Home team	Score	Visiting team
Bratislava, Slovakia	Hard (i)	Slovakia	4–1	Russia
Canberra, Australia	Grass	Australia	3–2	Ukraine
Cluj-Napoca, Romania	Hard (i)	Romania	3–1	Canada
Chieti, Italy	Clay (i)	Italy	3–2	Spain

== World Group II play-offs ==
The four losing teams in the World Group II ties and four winners of the zonal Groups I are scheduled to compete in the World Group II play-offs for spots in the 2019 World Group II.

Participating teams
Canada	Great Britain	Japan	Latvia
Paraguay	Russia	Spain	Ukraine

=== Seeds ===
1. Russia
2. Spain
3. Ukraine
4. Great Britain

Venue	Surface	Home team	Score	Visiting team
Khanty-Mansiysk, Russia	Clay (i)	Russia	2–3	Latvia
Cartagena, Spain	Clay	Spain	3–1	Paraguay
Montreal, Canada	Hard (i)	Canada	3–2	Ukraine
Miki, Japan	Hard (i)	Japan	3–2	Great Britain

== Americas Zone ==
=== Group I ===
Location: Club Internacional de Tenis, Asunción, Paraguay (clay)

Dates: 7–10 February

Participating teams

Pool A

- Chile
- Colombia
- Paraguay

Pool B

- Argentina
- Brazil
- Guatemala
- Venezuela

Withdrawn

- Puerto Rico

==== Play-offs ====
- Paraguay was promoted to the 2018 Fed Cup World Group II play-offs.
- Venezuela and Guatemala were relegated to Americas Zone Group II in 2019.

=== Group II ===
Venue 1: Club Deportivo La Asunción, Metepec, Mexico (hard)
Venue 2: Centro Nacional de Tenis de la FET, Guayaquil, Ecuador (clay)

Dates: 20–23 June and 18–21 July

Pool A (Metepec)

- Barbados
- Dominican Republic
- Mexico

Pool B (Metepec)

- Cuba
- Peru
- Uruguay

Pool A (Guayaquil)

- Costa Rica
- Ecuador
- Honduras

Pool B (Guayaquil)

- Bahamas
- Bermuda
- Bolivia
- Trinidad and Tobago

Withdrawn

- Panama

Inactive teams

- Antigua and Barbuda
- El Salvador
- Eastern Caribbean
- Haiti
- Jamaica

==== Play-offs ====
- Mexico and Ecuador were promoted to Americas Zone Group I in 2019.

== Asia/Oceania Zone ==
=== Group I ===
Venue: R.K. Khanna Tennis Complex, New Delhi, India (hard)

Dates: 7–10 February

Participating teams

Pool A

- China
- Hong Kong
- India
- Kazakhstan

Pool B

- Chinese Taipei
- Japan
- South Korea
- Thailand

==== Play-offs ====
- Japan was promoted to the 2018 Fed Cup World Group II play-offs.
- Chinese Taipei and Hong Kong were relegated to Asia/Oceania Zone Group II in 2019.

=== Group II ===
Venue: Bahrain Polytechnic, Isa Town, Bahrain (hard)

Dates: 6–10 February

Participating teams

Pool A

- Lebanon
- New Zealand
- Uzbekistan

Pool C

- Iran
- Malaysia
- Oman
- Pacific Oceania

Pool B

- Kyrgyzstan
- Philippines
- Singapore

Pool D

- Bahrain
- Indonesia
- Pakistan
- Sri Lanka

Withdrawn

- Tajikistan
- Turkmenistan

Inactive teams

- Brunei
- Iraq
- Jordan
- Syria
- Vietnam

==== Play-offs ====
- Indonesia and Pacific Oceania were promoted to Asia/Oceania Zone Group I in 2019.

== Europe/Africa Zone ==
=== Group I ===
Venue: Tallink Tennis Centre, Tallinn, Estonia (indoor hard)

Dates: 7–10 February

Participating teams

Pool A

- Bulgaria
- Georgia
- Serbia

Pool C

- Croatia
- Hungary
- Slovenia
- Sweden

Pool B

- Estonia
- Great Britain
- Portugal

Pool D

- Austria
- Latvia
- Poland
- Turkey

==== Play-offs ====
- Great Britain and Latvia were promoted to the 2018 Fed Cup World Group II play-offs.
- Austria and Portugal were relegated to Europe/Africa Zone Group II in 2019.

=== Group II ===
Venue: Tatoi Club, Athens, Greece (clay)

Dates: 18–21 April

Participating teams

Pool A

- Denmark
- Egypt
- Greece

Pool B

- Bosnia and Herzegovina
- Israel
- Luxembourg
- Norway

Withdrawn

- Moldova

==== Play-offs ====
- Greece and Denmark were promoted to Europe/Africa Zone Group I in 2019.
- Egypt and Norway were relegated to Europe/Africa Zone Group III in 2019.

=== Group III ===
Venue 1: Cité Nationale Sportive, Tunis, Tunisia (hard)
Venue 2: Ulcinj Bellevue, Ulcinj, Montenegro (clay)

Dates: 16–21 April

Participating teams

Pool A (Tunis)

- Armenia
- Iceland
- Lithuania
- Macedonia

Pool A (Ulcinj)

- Finland
- Kenya
- Montenegro
- South Africa

Pool B (Tunis)

- Algeria
- Cyprus
- Kosovo
- Madagascar
- Tunisia

Pool B (Ulcinj)

- Ireland
- Malta
- Morocco
- Uganda

Withdrawn

- Cameroon
- Mozambique

Inactive teams

- Azerbaijan
- Botswana
- Congo
- Ethiopia
- Lesotho
- Liechtenstein
- Mauritius
- Namibia
- San Marino
- Senegal
- Zimbabwe

==== Play-offs ====
- Tunisia and South Africa were promoted to Europe/Africa Zone Group II in 2019.
