= Bahrain Billie Jean King Cup team =

Bahraini women's tennis team

Bahrain
- Nations Ranking: NR (16 November 2015)
- First year: 2016
- Years played: 0
- Ties played (W–L): 0 (0–0)

The Bahrain Billie Jean King Cup team represents Bahrain in Billie Jean King Cup tennis competition and are governed by the Bahrain Tennis Federation. They took part in the Fed Cup for the first time in 2016, competing in the Asia/Oceania Zone Group II.

== Players ==
Year	Team		
2016	Maram Mohamed Sharif	Nader Nazli Redha	Jasim Malak Fardan

== See also ==
- Billie Jean King Cup
- Bahrain Davis Cup team
