= Bahrain Polytechnic =

- بوليتكنك البحرين
- Logo
- Established: 2008; 18 years ago
- Chairman: Wael bin Nasser Al-Mubarak
- Location: Isa Town, Bahrain; 26°9′54″N 50°32′44″E
- Website: www.polytechnic.bh

Bahrain Polytechnic is a government-owned tertiary education institute located in the Kingdom of Bahrain. It has been established by King Hamad bin Isa Al Khalifa; King of Bahrain by Royal Decree in July 2008. It is considered a key initiative for the Education and Training Development Committee; a project of the Bahrain Vision 2030 master plan that aims to achieve a sustainable economy. Bahrain Polytechnic delivers applied learning, technical education, skills-based and occupational training. Degrees offered range from certificate courses, diplomas, to bachelor's degree levels.

== Establishment ==
Bahrain Polytechnic was established by Royal Decree number 65 for the year 2008 by His Majesty King Hamad bin Isa Al Khalifa, King of Bahrain.

== Official opening ==
Bahrain Polytechnic's official opening ceremony took place on 30 November 2008, by His Royal Highness Prince Salman bin Hamad bin Isa Al Khalifa, Crown Prince and Chairman of the Economic Development Board. The opening ceremony was attended by the Deputy Prime Minister of Bahrain and the Head of the Education and Training Committee Shaikh Mohammed bin Mubarak Al Khalifa, Ministers, and other members of the government and the Education Reform Project Board.

The Deputy Prime Minister Shaikh Mohammed paid a visit to Bahrain Polytechnic's premises in June 2008, to inspect the steps taken and to pave the way for the official opening with took place later on that year.

== Board of trustees ==
The Chairman of the Board and the first four members have been assigned for four consecutive years, and the later three have been assigned for three consecutive years. On Tuesday, 27 April 2021, His Majesty King Hamad bin Isa Al-Khalifa issued a Royal Decree No. (55) for the year 2021 reforming Bahrain Polytechnic's Board of Trustees under the chairmanship of Wael Bin Nasser Al Mubarak.

== Location and campus ==
Bahrain Polytechnic is located in Isa Town, approximately 14 kilometers to the South West of central Manama. The Campus currently is shared between Bahrain Polytechnic and University of Bahrain's Engineering College and Applied Sciences College. Plans are that Bahrain Polytechnic will take over the entire campus in the coming years, while University of Bahrain will fully locate itself in its main and already established campus in Sakhir.

As for Bahrain Polytechnic's campus in Isa Town, Bahrain's Ministry of Works is leading a campus master plan project in which the current campus's buildings will be replaced with a modern state-of-art campus. The target budget for the whole scope of the project including the consultants’ fees is approximately US$250 million.

The Ministry of Works sought proposals internationally from Consultancy firms to undertake the development of Bahrain Polytechnic's campus master plan and concept design of all the facilities. Four companies have bid for the project. In November 2009 the Tender Board awarded the task to international architectural firm Aedas. This was followed by official appointment of designer with the Ministry on 11 January 2010 and commencement of design work shortly afterwards.

Bahrain Polytechnic's new campus will be developed in stages. The construction development period assumes six stages of development, over nearly nine to ten years.

== See also ==
- List of universities in Bahrain
