= Lebanon Billie Jean King Cup team =

- First year: 1993

The Lebanon Billie Jean King Cup team represents Lebanon in the Billie Jean King Cup tennis competition and are governed by the Fédération Libaniase de Tennis. They have not competed since 2018.

== History ==
Lebanon competed in its first Fed Cup in 1993. They have lost both of their ties to date.

== See also ==
- Billie Jean King Cup
- Lebanon Davis Cup team
